= Gabriella Cilmi discography =

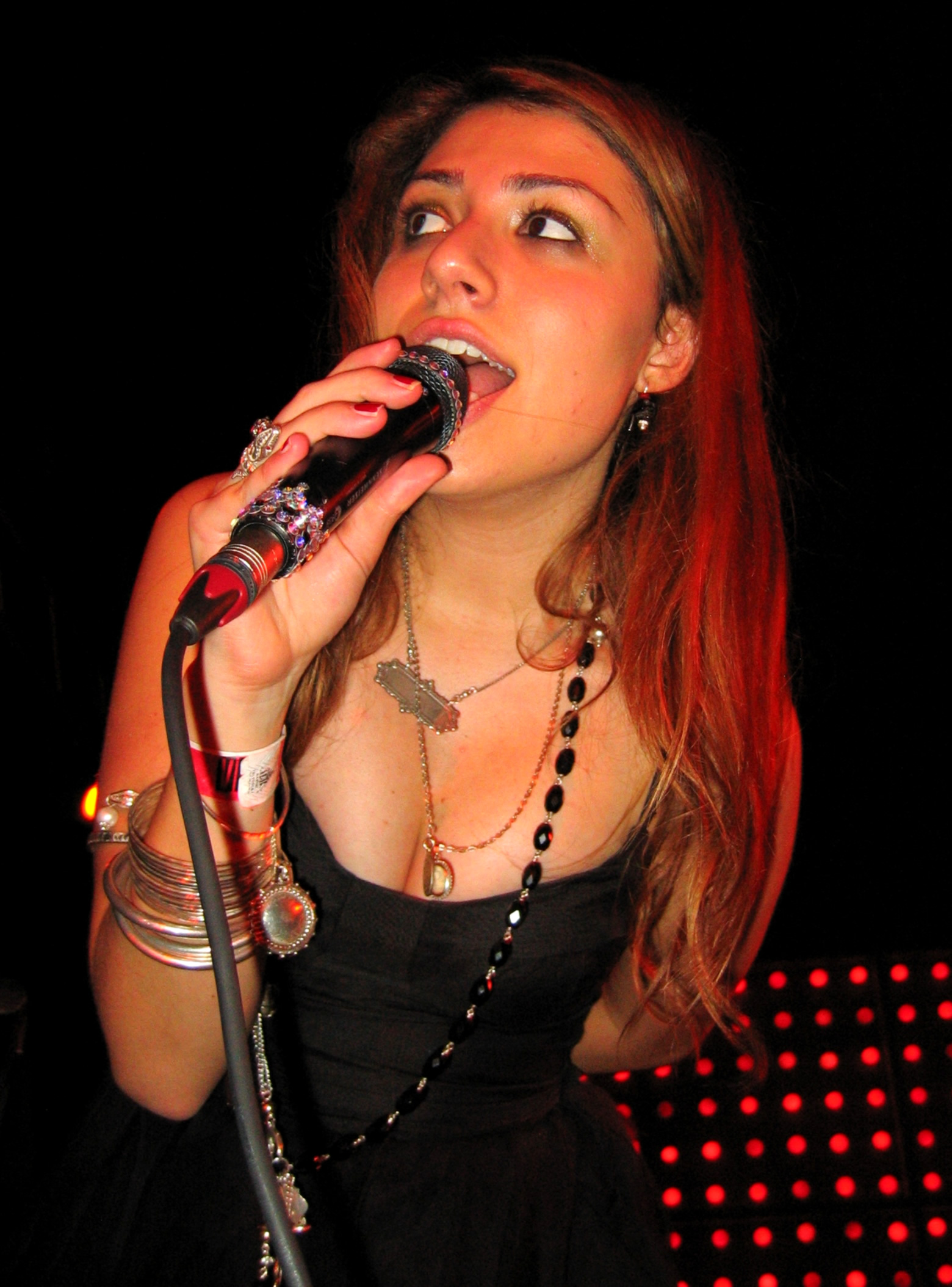
- Cilmi performing in 2008
- Studio albums: 4
- Extended plays: 4
- Singles: 17
- Promotional singles: 2
- Music videos: 12

Gabriella Cilmi is an Australian-Italian pop singer whose music spans a range of musical genres including pop, rock and soul. Cilmi has released 4 studio albums, 4 EPs, 17 singles, 2 promotional singles and 12 music videos on record label Island.

Her debut single, "Sanctuary", was released in 2007 to digital download retailers only, with limited success. It did not appear on any national charts. Cilmi's second single "Sweet About Me" achieved worldwide chart success, reaching number-one in her native Australia, as well as the top ten in several countries. It has been said that Cilmi's further success following "Sweet About Me" was hindered because "most record buyers still only know her for one song." Following the high sales of "Sweet About Me", she released her first studio album Lessons to Be Learned, which reached the top ten in Australia, New Zealand and countries across Europe. Cilmi released four further singles from the album, including a re-release of "Sanctuary" and digital download-only single "Warm This Winter", which was released in the United Kingdom only after being used in a promotional campaign for Co-operative Food.

Cilmi's second album, Ten was released in March 2010 and was preceded by single "On a Mission", an upbeat dance-pop song, which reached the top ten of the UK Singles Chart. Cilmi also released two follow-up singles from the album titled "Hearts Don't Lie" and "Defender", respectively. "Magic Carpet Ride", used as a B-side on the "On a Mission" and "Defender" single releases, was also released as a double A-side promotional single with "Defender".

In March 2013, Cilmi released a free single, "Sweeter in History", followed by a commercially released single "The Sting" in September 2013 from her third studio album, The Sting. "Symmetry" was released as the album's second and final single on 11 November 2013. After a few years break she released "the Water" EP in 2019, which was promoted though the single "Ruins" also in 2019.

== Albums ==
=== Studio albums ===
List of studio albums, with selected chart positions and certifications
Title	Details	Peak chart positions										Certifications (sales thresholds)
Title	Details	AUS	AUT	DEN	GER	NLD	NOR	NZ	SWI	UK	US Heat	Certifications (sales thresholds)
Lessons to Be Learned	Released: 31 March 2008; Label: Island; Formats: CD, digital download	2	6	29	10	9	15	6	7	8	17	ARIA: Platinum; BPI: Gold; BVMI: Gold; IFPI SWI: Gold
Ten	Released: 22 March 2010; Label: Island; Formats: CD, digital download	17	73	—	61	63	—	—	29	28	—	
The Sting	Released: 8 November 2013; Label: Sweetness; Formats: CD, digital download	—	—	—	—	—	—	—	—	—	—	
Pure Love	Released: 9 October 2026; Label: V2 Records; Formats: CD, digital download	TBA										
"—" denotes that the release did not chart or was not released.

== Extended plays ==
List of extended plays
Title	Details
Sweet About Me	Released: 10 March 2008; Label: Warner Australia, Island; Formats: Digital download
Ronnie Scott's Live Session	Released: 5 May 2008; Label: Universal; Formats: Digital download
iTunes Festival: London 2008	Released: 14 July 2008; Label: Island; Formats: Digital download
The Water	Released: 1 November 2019; Label: Kin Records Ltd; Formats: Digital download

== Singles ==
List of singles, with selected chart positions and certifications
Title	Year	Peak chart positions										Certifications	Album
Title	Year	AUS	AUT	DEN	EUR	GER	NLD	NOR	NZ	SWI	UK	Certifications	Album
"Sanctuary"	2007	—	—	—	—	67	72	—	—	—	—		Lessons to Be Learned
"Sweet About Me"	2008	1	2	5	2	2	1	1	6	2	6	ARIA: Platinum; BPI: Silver; BVMI: Platinum; IFPI DEN: Platinum; IFPI SWI: Platinum; RMNZ: Gold	Lessons to Be Learned
"Don't Wanna Go to Bed Now"	2008	28	—	—	—	—	—	—	—	—	—		Lessons to Be Learned
"Save the Lies"	2008	—	—	—	—	—	—	—	—	—	33		Lessons to Be Learned
"Warm This Winter"	2008	—	—	—	68	—	—	—	—	—	22		Lessons to Be Learned
"On a Mission"	2010	16	63	—	30	84	51	—	—	—	9	ARIA: Gold	Ten
"Hearts Don't Lie"	2010	51	—	—	—	—	—	—	—	—	134		Ten
"Defender"	2010	—	—	—	—	—	—	—	—	—	—		Ten
"The Sting"	2013	—	—	—	—	—	—	—	—	—	—		The Sting
"Symmetry"	2013	—	—	—	—	—	—	—	—	—	—		The Sting
"Ruins"	2019	—	—	—	—	—	—	—	—	—	—		The Water
"The Water"	2019	—	—	—	—	—	—	—	—	—	—		The Water
"Keep On Keeping"	2019	—	—	—	—	—	—	—	—	—	—		The Water
"Pure Love"	2026	—	—	—	—	—	—	—	—	—	—		Pure Love
"YRU Hanging Around"	2026	—	—	—	—	—	—	—	—	—	—		Pure Love
"Pieces"	2026	—	—	—	—	—	—	—	—	—	—		Pure Love
"What We Do"	2026	—	—	—	—	—	—	—	—	—	—		Pure Love
"—" denotes that the release did not chart or was not released.

== Promotional singles ==
List of promotional singles
Title	Year	Album
"Magic Carpet Ride"	2010	Ten
"Sweeter in History"	2013	The Sting

== Music videos ==
Video	Year	Director
"Sweet About Me"	2008	Mike Baldwin
"Don't Wanna Go to Bed Now"	2008	Harvey
"Save the Lies"	2008	Harvey
"Sanctuary"	2008	Mike Baldwin
"On a Mission"	2010	Michael Gracey
"Hearts Don't Lie"	2010	Emil Nava
"Defender"	2010	Emil Nava
"Vicious Love"	2012	Sam Wrench
"Sweeter in History"	2013	Sam Wrench
"The Sting"	2013	Sam Wrench
"Symmetry"	2013	Sam Wrench
"Ruins"	2019	

== Other appearances ==
Many of Cilmi's songs appear on albums and soundtracks by other artists but are also featured on her own releases, as album tracks or B-sides. The following have been officially released, but do not appear on any of Cilmi's own releases.

Song	Year	Album appearance	Album artist
"Don't Tell Me"	2005	Hating Alison Ashley (OST)	Various artists
"Ob-La-Di, Ob-La-Da"	2008	Mojo Presents: The White Album Recovered, Vol. 1	Various artists
"Non Ti Aspettavo (Libertà)" (duet with Nevio Passaro)	2008	Due	Nevio Passaro
"How Can I Tell You"	2009	Island Life: 50 Years of Island Records	Various artists
"Danny Nedelko"	2019	Covers - YouTube Sessions	Gabriella Cilmi
