= Vicious Love =

There are three songs with that name:

- by Gabriella Cilmi, see The Sting (Gabriella Cilmi album)
- by Lexy & K-Paul
- by New Found Glory, featuring Hayley Williams, see Resurrection (New Found Glory album)
