= Follow the Boys =

Follow the Boys may refer to:

- Follow the Boys (1944 film), an American musical film
- Follow the Boys (1963 film), an American comedy film
- Follow the Boys (album), a 1963 album by Connie Francis
- "Follow the Boys" (song), a song by Connie Francis, from the 1963 film

== See also ==
- Follow Me, Boys!, a 1966 American drama film
