= Save the Lies =

- Australian cover

Single by Gabriella Cilmi

from the album Lessons to Be Learned
- Released: 18 August 2008 (UK); 1 November 2008 (Australia)
- Genre: Disco, funk rock
- Length: 3:38
- Label: Island
- Songwriters: Gabriella Cilmi, Miranda Cooper, Brian Higgins, Tim Powell, Bob Bradley, Saint Etienne
- Producers: Brian Higgins, Xenomania

Gabriella Cilmi singles chronology
| "Don't Wanna Go to Bed Now" (2008) | "Save the Lies" (2008) | "Warm This Winter" (2008) |

Music video
- "Save the Lies" on YouTube

Alternative cover
- UK cover

"Save the Lies" (also known as "Save the Lies (Good to Me)") is the second UK single from Australian singer–songwriter Gabriella Cilmi's debut album, Lessons to Be Learned (2008). The track listing and cover art were revealed on the singer's official website with a release date of 18 August 2008. It was also released in Australia as the album's third single on 1 November 2008. Cilmi performed the song on Australian Idol on 20 October 2008.

== Release and promotion ==
"Save the Lies" began to receive promotion and airplay in late 2008 on the Nova Network. Since then, it has increasingly gained airplay on the Today Network stations at certain times only.

In the UK's Big Brother 2008, the song provided the background music to Australian-born Sara's "Best Bits" when she finished in third place. In the fifth series of The X Factor, contestant Hannah Bradbeer sang the song in the "Visit to Judges Houses" round. "Save the Lies" was also featured in the second season of ABC's Samantha Who? and in the premiere season of The CW's 90210.

In her native Australia, Cilmi performed the song on the sixth season of Australian Idol on 20 October 2008, as well as on the special Melbourne concert Sound Relief on 14 March 2009.

== Chart performance ==
"Save the Lies" entered the UK Singles Chart at number ninety-one on downloads alone, eventually jumping up fifty-eight places to number thirty-three upon its physical release in August 2008. In Australia, the single was initially played a few weeks after "Sweet About Me" reached number one, but several weeks later "Don't Wanna Go to Bed Now" was announced as the next single. The single then started getting minimum airplay in October, and eventually reached number twenty-nine on the ARIA Club Chart the week of 17 November 2008, but was unable to enter the ARIA Top 100 Singles Chart.

== Music video ==
The video Cilmi singing in a variety of different environments and outfits.

== Track listings and formats ==
UK CD single

1. "Save the Lies (Good to Me)" – 3:16
2. "Sweet About Me" (Live) – 3:41
3. "Cry Me a River" (Live) – 3:40
4. "Fly Me to the Moon" – 3:05

Australian CD single

1. "Save the Lies" (Single Version) – 3:13
2. "Save the Lies" (Out of Office Club Mix) – 7:10
3. "Save the Lies" (Out of Office Dub Mix) – 7:08
4. "Save the Lies" (Kinky Roland Remix) – 7:10

== Charts ==
| Chart (2008) | Peak position |
|---|---|
| Australia Club Tracks (ARIA) Mason/Out of Office mix | 29 |
| Scottish Singles Sales (Official Charts) | 5 |
| UK Singles (Official Charts) | 33 |
