= LTBL =

LTBL may refer to:

- Lessons to Be Learned, an album by Australian singer-songwriter Gabriella Cilmi.
- The ICAO code for Çiğli Air Base, a military airport in Turkey.
- Leukoencephalopathy with thalamus and brainstem involvement and high lactate, a rare disorder that affects the brain.
