= CD single =

Music single in the form of a compact disc

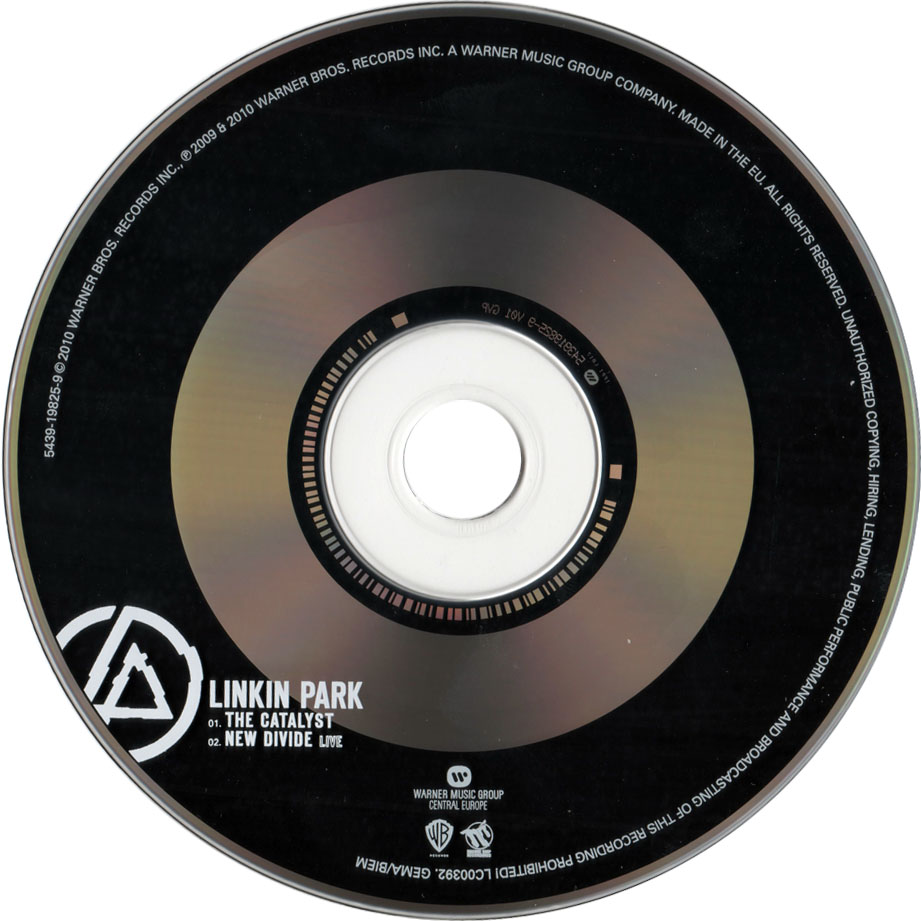
A CD single (specifically CD5) of "The Catalyst" by Linkin Park. It contains a second track (comparable to a B-side): "New Divide (Live)".

A CD single is a music single in the form of a compact disc (CD). Originally the CD single standard (as defined in the Red Book) was an 8 cm (3-inch) "mini CD" (CD3); later on the term referred to any single recorded onto a CD of any size, particularly the 12 cm (5-inch) "full-size" disc (CD5). From a technical viewpoint, a CD single is identical to any other audio CD. The format started gaining popularity in the early 1990s, but quickly declined in the early and mid 2000s, in favor of digital downloaded singles and CD albums.

Commercially released CD singles can vary in length from two songs (an A side and B side, in the tradition of 7-inch 45-rpm records) up to six songs like an EP, which would be marketed as a maxi single in some regions. Some contain multiple mixes of one or more songs (known as remixes), in the tradition of 12-inch vinyl singles, and in some cases, they may also contain a music video for the single itself (this is an enhanced CD) as well as occasionally a poster. Depending on the country of release, there may be limits on the number of songs and total length for sales to count in singles charts.

== History and sales ==
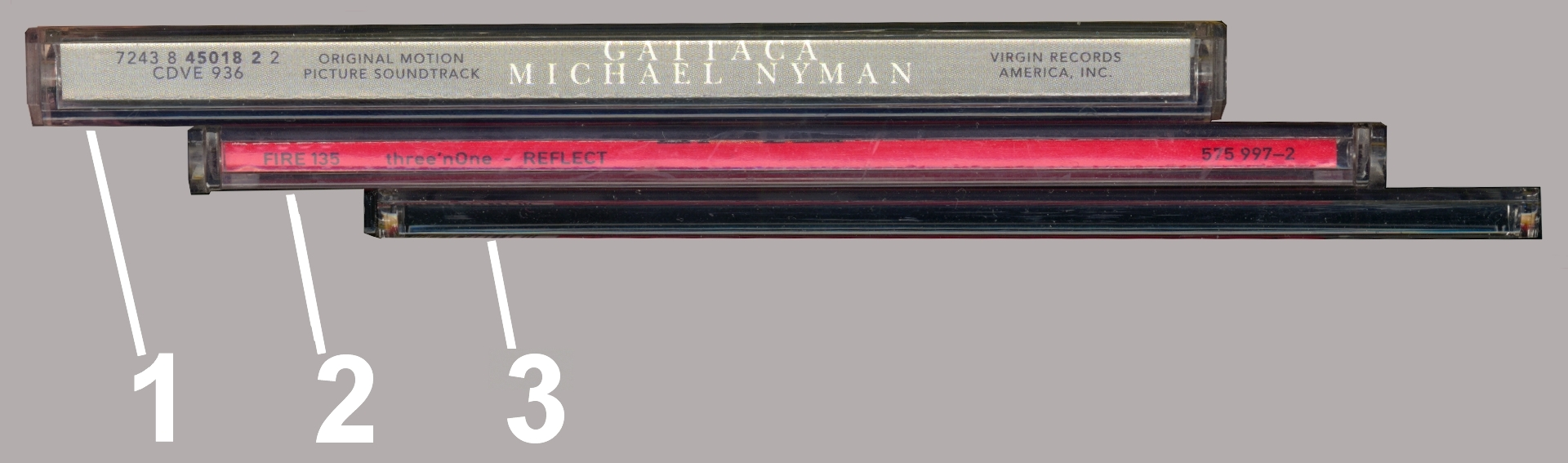
Full-size CD singles were normally packaged in slimmer jewel cases (labeled here as '2') as compared to CD albums (labeled here as '1')

The Mini CD single CD3 format was originally created for use for singles in the late 1980s, but met with limited success, particularly in the US. The smaller CDs were more successful in Japan and had a resurgence in Europe in the early 2000s, marketed as "Pock it" CDs, being small enough to fit in a shirt pocket. By 1989, the CD3 was in decline in the US (replaced by the 5-inch CD single, called CD5).

During the 1990s, CD single releases became less common in certain countries and were often released in smaller editions, as the major record labels feared they were cannibalizing the sales of higher-profit-margin CD albums.

=== United States ===
It was common in the 1990s for US record companies to release both a two-track CD and a multi-track (usually "remix") maxi CD.

Pressure from record labels made singles charts in some countries become song charts, allowing album cuts to chart based only on airplay, without a single ever being released. In the US, the Billboard Hot 100 made this change in December 1998, after which very few songs were released in the CD single format in the US, but they remained extremely popular in other countries, where charts were still based solely on single sales and not radio airplay.

In the year 2000, the RIAA reported that CD single sales fell by 39%, with internet downloading service Napster being blamed. In October 2001, Target, which was the fourth largest music retailer in the United States, announced that it will stop selling CD singles in many of its stores due to a fall in demand.

=== United Kingdom ===
CD singles were first made eligible for the UK Singles Chart in 1987, and the first number 1 available on the format in that country was "I Wanna Dance with Somebody (Who Loves Me)" by Whitney Houston in May 1987. At the end of the 1990s, the CD was the biggest-selling single format in the UK. Record companies would also release two CDs but, usually, these consisted of three tracks or more each.

Smaller 3-inch CDs were made mostly in a small square case/cover form only, some including a 5-inch CD adapter to use in normal compact disc players. Although the format was not widely available in the United Kingdom, several artists have released singles in the format.

==== Sales figures ====
Table shows CD single sales in the United Kingdom and as a percentage of all music formats sold.

CD single sales in the UK
Period	Sales	% of all formats
January–December 1999	34.3 million	95+
January–December 2004		50
January–June 2006		19
January–June 2007		8.1
January–December 2007	8 million	
January–December 2008	4.6 million	
January–1 October 2009	Less than 1.6 million	
January - September 2021	60,000	

At Q4 1996, there were 24.2 million CD singles shipped in the country. At Q4 1999 CDs made up 74.6% of single sales, with cassingle in second place and 12" singles in third place. By 2003, CD singles had significantly dropped from its peak while albums reached an all-time high. This was in part by an increase in the price of singles, which was about £4 and provided worse value for money compared to an album for £10.

Asda stopped selling CD singles in 2007. Woolworths Group, which previously accounted for one third of all CD sales in the country, stopped selling CD singles in August 2008, citing the "terminal decline" of the format as customers moved to digital downloads as their preferred method of purchasing single tracks (the Woolworths chain itself would collapse the following November). In March 2011, Mercury Records announced that they were to stop manufacturing CD singles for lack of demand and loss of money on the format in 2010.

In July 2009, The Guardian reported that Florence + The Machine's single 'Rabbit Heart (Raise It Up)' sold a CD and 7 inch vinyl combined total of 64 copies, where it reached number 16 in the Mid-Week Chart.

'Bad Habits' by Ed Sheeran was the best-selling CD single as of September 2021 with 11,000 copies.

=== Elsewhere ===
In Australia, the Herald Sun reported the CD single is "set to become extinct". In early July 2009, leading music store JB Hi-Fi ceased stocking CD singles because of declining sales, with copies of the week's No. 1 single often selling as few as only 350 copies across all their stores nationwide. While CD singles no longer maintain their own section of the store, copies are still distributed but placed with the artist's albums. That is predominantly the case for popular Australian artists such as Jessica Mauboy, Kylie Minogue and, most recently, Delta Goodrem, whose then-recent singles ("What Happened to Us", "Put Your Hands Up (If You Feel Love)" and "Sitting on Top of the World" respectively) were released on CD in limited quantities. The ARIA Singles Chart is now "predominantly compiled from legal downloads", and ARIA also stopped compiling their physical singles sales chart. "On a Mission" by Gabriella Cilmi was the last CD single to be stocked in Kmart, Target and Big W, who then concluded stocking newly released singles. Sanity Entertainment, having resisted the decline for longer than the other major outlets, has also ceased selling CD singles.

In Germany, CD singles continue to be regularly issued by all major and some minor labels, and both of domestic and foreign artists.

In China and South Korea, CD single releases have been rare ever since the format was introduced, due to the amount of infringement and illegal file sharing over the internet, and most of the time singles have generally been album cuts chart based only on airplay, but with the advent of digital music the charts have also occasionally included digital download counts.

In Greece and Cyprus, the term "CD single" is used to describe an extended play (EP) in which there may be anywhere from three to six different tracks. These releases charted on the Greek Singles Chart (before it abandoned tracking altogether) with songs released as singles.

== Mini CD (3-inch) ==
Mini CD single
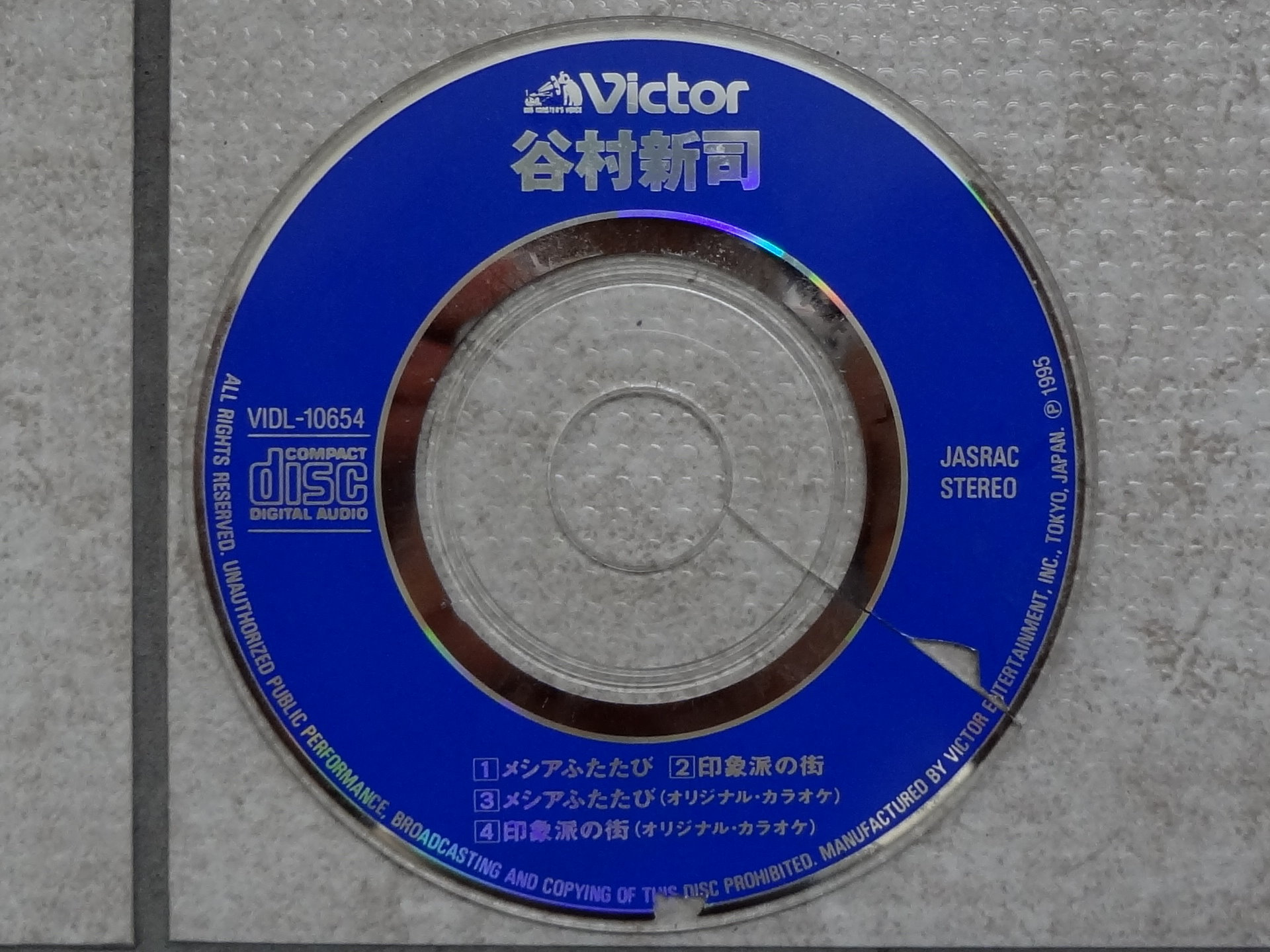
- A Japanese "Mini CD" single
- Media type: Optical disc
- Capacity: 80 mm holds up to 24 minutes of music, or 210 MB (210 × 2^{20} bytes) of data.
- Standard: Red Book
- Dimensions: 8 centimeters (3.1 inches)
- Usage: Audio storage
- Released: 1987; 39 years ago

The original CD single (sometimes mini CD single or 3-inch CD or CD3 in the US) is a music single first released on a mini Compact Disc in 1987 that measures 8 cm (3.1 in) in diameter, rather than the standard 12 cm (4.7 in). They are manufactured using the same methods as standard full-size CDs, and can be played in most standard audio CD players and CD-ROM disc drives.

The format was first released in the United States, United Kingdom, France, West Germany, and Hong Kong in 1987 as the replacement for the 7-inch single. While mini CDs quickly fell out of popularity among most major record labels (partly due to their incompatibility with many slot-loading CD players), they lasted longer as a popular, low cost way for independent musicians and groups to release music.

Capable of holding up to 20 minutes of music, most mini CD singles contain at least two tracks, often consisting of a single edit and an instrumental version in the same way as 7-inch vinyl singles.

From a technical standpoint, a 3-inch CD is the same as a standard CD (Red Book standard for CD digital audio) with the major difference being the smaller physical size of the disc allowing fewer data sectors, meaning the disc can store less audio. The majority of audio CD players and CD-ROM drives have a smaller circular indentation in the CD tray for holding these discs. Most slot-loading drives, such as those found in some car CD players, are unable to manipulate the smaller discs or their adapters. Laptop drives generally only require the centre hole to hold the disc so the smaller diameter is irrelevant.

=== Japan ===
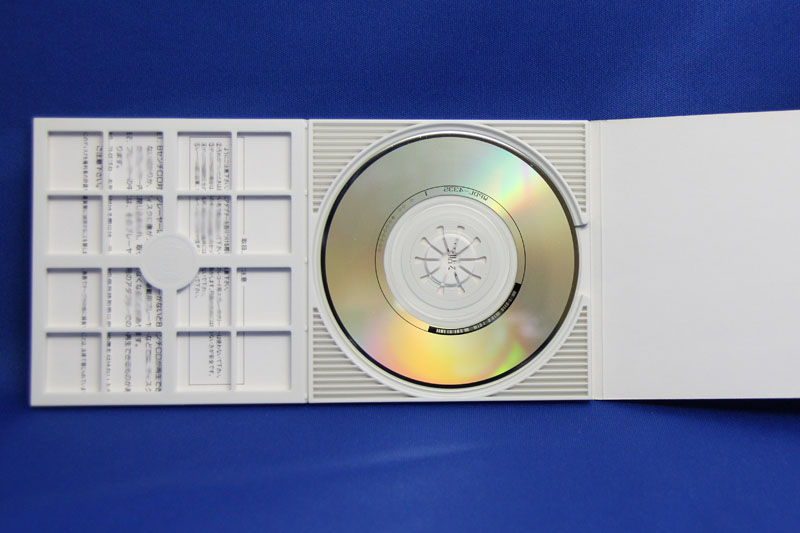
8 cm CD single with case, released in Japan

In Japan, 8 cm (3 in) 3"CD singles were initially released in 1988 in a long flip-out sleeve snap-packs (Japanese: 短冊; tanzaku). The plastic inserts in the sleeves could be snapped in half and folded into a small 8 cm (3 in) square, rather than the original 15 cm × 8 cm (6 in × 3 in) length when originally sold.

==== Trend of Physical Music Production ====
Production of Recorded Music 3"CD single units
Year	Units
1988	25,557,000
1989	47,094,000
1990	61,820,000
1991	88,776,000
1992	110,559,000
1993	153,795,000
1994	138,271,000
1995	164,581,000
1996	166,294,000
1997	167,827,000
1998	154,260,000
1999	86,333,000
2000	33,124,000
2001	9,788,000
2002	7,967,000
2021	9,000
2023	186,000
2024	326,000
2025	36,000

Beginning in 1989 some labels began to package mini CDs in 12 cm (5 in) slimline cases. As the tanzaku sleeves slowly morphed into the use of slimline jewel cases, the production of mini CD singles was halted in the early 2000s.

As popularity diminished, one of the last Japanese 8 cm CD single released was a reissue and repackaging of "I Was Born to Love You" by Queen in 2004. Many of the artists who released 8 cm CDs are from that era, including Wink, Madonna, Phil Collins, Michael Jackson, Queen, U2, Prince, Metallica, Bros, Huey Lewis and the News, Bon Jovi, Kylie Minogue, Falco and George Michael. Some singles packaged in 12 cm single jewel cases contained a 12 cm CD adapter.

Most were sold at around ¥1,000 (£6 or $9) at the time of release during the late 1980s, early 2000s to the present day.

==== Present ====
However, there has been a small revival of mini CD singles with Japanese artists such as Hibari Misora with a reissue of her 1989 single "Kawa no Nagare no Yoni" in May 2019 in original long tanzaku form, by the record company Nippon Columbia and in July 2024 with girl group Wink Music Service releasing To Rome with Love.

Sales data by the Recording Industry Association of Japan show that mini CD Singles reached peak popularity during the 1990s with 167,000,000 units sold in 1997 to a sharp decrease in production during the mid-2000s. In 2021 only 9,000 units were released. Presently, there has been an increase with 36,000 produced in 2025. Since 2023, a day named "Tanzaku CD Day" on 7 July was chosen to celebrate the CD format. It is now promoted and celebrated every year in CD shops nationwide with new releases.

=== United States ===
US versions were often packaged in cardboard slipcases, either 3-inch square or 6-inch by 3-inch gatefold. Others were released in 5-inch slimline single cases, which allowed an adapter to be included with the CD. At the time of first release in 1987, their retail price was between $4 and $6, at least $3 less than even the least-expensive 5-inch discs. Delos Records, a small, independent label, issued the first commercially available 3-inch CDs in 1987 with 20 classical and jazz titles. The Massachusetts-based Rykodisc issued Frank Zappa's “Peaches en Regalia” the first pop 3-inch CD. Initially when released, 300,000 of the discs were shipped to retail outlets. Noted oldies label Rhino had a series of over 60 3-inch CDs released throughout 1988 entitled "Lil' Bit Of Gold".

=== Longevity ===
In the United States and United Kingdom, the format barely lasted into the early 1990s, partly due to inconvenience of needing to attach an adapter on every disc (very few packages were issued with one) before playing. Sony remained in support of the 3-inch CD having had plans to launch a 3-inch CD player for the Japanese market in 1988.

Among major labels, it was largely replaced by putting less music on a regular full-size CD. The full-size discs are a more standard manufacturing process and so ended up being cheaper to press. The CD single format continued in larger production until the early 2000s with for Japanese releases, but continued to the present day in much smaller numbers. Despite the unpopularity it survived with publishers adopting the 3-inch CD as an inexpensive way of presenting bonus material with books.

=== Technical specifications ===
- Data: 185–210MiB (compared to 650–703MiB on a 12 cm CD)
- Audio: 21–24 minutes (compared to 74–80 minutes on a 12 cm CD)

The slim jewel boxes used for 3-inch CDs are nearly the same size as 3.5-inch floppy disks, making storage boxes for 3.5-inch floppies usable for 3-inch CDs as well.

== See also ==
- Radio single
- A-side and B-side
- EP
- Maxi single
- Digital download
