= I'm Gonna Be Warm This Winter =

1962 single performed by Connie Francis

Single by Connie Francis
- B-side: Al di là; Pretty Little Baby
- Released: 1962
- Recorded: 1962
- Genre: Rock and roll
- Length: 2:25
- Label: MGM Records K 13116
- Songwriters: Hank Hunter, Mark Barkan
- Producer: Danny Davis

Connie Francis U.S. singles chronology
"I Was Such a Fool (To Fall in Love with You)" / "He Thinks I Still Care" (1962)	"I'm Gonna Be Warm This Winter" (1962)	"Follow the Boys" / "Waiting for Billy" (1963)

"I'm Gonna Be Warm This Winter" is a 1962 single by Connie Francis, released in that December to peak at #18 on both the Billboard Hot 100 and the Cash Box Top 100. The song reached #22 UK in December 2008 via a remake by Gabriella Cilmi titled "Warm This Winter".

== Connie Francis version ==
=== Background ===
"I'm Gonna Be Warm This Winter" was written by Mark Barkan with Hank Hunter. Hunter wrote several songs recorded by Connie Francis including her Top Ten singles "Second Hand Love" and "Vacation".

Connie Francis previously had a seasonally themed hit single with "Baby's First Christmas", which peaked at #26 on the Billboard Hot 100 and #7 on the same magazine's then-new Easy Listening (now Adult Contemporary) chart during the 1961 holiday season, and although she would not have a single released during the holidays in 1963, her hit "Blue Winter" was released in January 1964 - still in the season of winter, and peaked at #24 on the Hot 100, and #7 on Billboard's Easy Listening (Adult Contemporary) chart sometime after spring started.

=== Recording ===
The original track and two introductions were recorded with producer Danny Davis in New York City on September 13, 1962: the orchestral arrangement for the session was by Bill Ramal whose credits included the arrangement for the Del Shannon hit "Runaway". The session personnel included drummer Gary Chester. Besides the original intro: "We met at a ski lodge/ And we fell in love", Francis recorded a distinct intro for the track's UK release: "We met on a winter day", the reasoning being that the "ski lodge" reference would fail to resonate in the UK that nation having virtually no facilities for skiing. Francis overdubbed a harmony vocal in a November 3 session also produced by Davis: although Francis is known for her double-vocal recordings, "I'm Gonna Be Warm This Winter" is one of very few tracks on which Francis is self-harmonied throughout.

=== US release ===
"I'm Gonna Be Warm This Winter" was issued in the US at the beginning of December 1962: Francis promoted the track on the December 13 broadcast of American Bandstand marking Francis first appearance on the show since 1958. "I'm Gonna Be Warm This Winter" reached the Top 20 in a number of regional markets generally peaking outside the Top Ten, although the track was especially successful in Seattle reaching #4 and #5 on the hit parades of respectively KOL and KJR in January 1963. The national peak of #18 was reached in both Billboard and Cashbox on their respective singles charts dated January 26, 1963.

In January 1963 the original B-side of "I'm Gonna Be Warm This Winter": "Al di là", picked up enough airplay to reach #90 on the Billboard Hot 100 (#87 in Cash Box).

"I'm Gonna Be Warm This Winter" made its album debut on The Very Best of Connie Francis compilation album release in September 1963.

=== International release ===
In the UK "I'm Gonna Be Warm This Winter" spent a single week in the Top 50 appearing at #48 on the chart dated December 22, 1962 marking Francis' final UK chart appearance for almost three years. "I'm Gonna Be Warm This Winter" reached #1 in Hong Kong in February 1963; also in early 1963 the track reached #9 in Australia, to become Francis' final Top 20 hit in that nation, and #28 in the Netherlands.

In its international release "I'm Gonna Be Warm This Winter" retained "Al di là" as its B-side in some territories including Australia while in some other territories - including the UK - the B-side of "I'm Gonna Be Warm This Winter" was "Pretty Little Baby," which became an Internet hit in 2025, 63 years after it was originally recorded. Two territories had evidently unique releases of Francis' "I'm Gonna Be Warm This Winter": in New Zealand the track had Francis' rendition of "I Walk the Line" as its flip with neither side marked A-side or B-side, while in Sweden "I'm Gonna Be Warm This Winter" was made a B-side to "Playin' Games" which afforded Francis a #17 hit in April 1963. (Recorded in the same September 13, 1962 recording session as "I"m Gonna Be Warm This Winter" and likewise a Barkan-Hunter composition, "Playin' Games" was issued in territories other than Sweden - including the UK - with "I Was Such a Fool (To Fall in Love with You)" - Francis' precedent US A-side release to "I'm Gonna Be Warm This Winter" - as B-side).

=== Non-English versions ===
"I'm Gonna Be Warm This Winter" is one of the few Connie Francis hits remade by the singer in French, that rendering titled "L'Amour Est Un Cadeau Du Ciel" being recorded February 10, 1963. Unlike the English original, both single vocal and harmony vocal versions of the French interpretation were marketed in Canada and France. In June 1963 Francis overdubbed a Japanese vocal on the track of "I'm Gonna Be Warm This Winter" with the resultant track entitled 想い出の冬休み (romanized spelling: Omoide No Fuyuyasumi) (Winter of '42); Francis had overdubbed an Italian vocal on the track of "I'm Gonna Be Warm This Winter" on February 25, 1963, with the resultant track: "Sul monti blu" (The blue mountains) never being released.

=== 1989 version ===
"I'm Gonna Be Warm This Winter" was one of seventeen Connie Francis hits which the singer remade for her 1989 album Where the Hits Are a Roger Hawkins production recorded for Malaco Records at Muscle Shoals Sound Studios. "I'm Gonna Be Warm This Winter" was the lowest-charting hit remade for the album with the exception of "If I Didn't Care" (#22).

=== Charts ===
Chart (1962)	Peak position
Canada CHUM Chart	21
UK Singles Chart	48

== Gabriella Cilmi version ==
"Warm This Winter"

Single by Gabriella Cilmi

from the album Lessons to Be Learned
- Released: 15 December 2008
- Length: 2:33
- Label: Island
- Songwriters: Hank Hunter, Mark Barkan
- Producer: Xenomania

Gabriella Cilmi singles chronology
"Save the Lies" (2008)	"Warm This Winter" (2008)	"On a Mission" (2010)

Audio video
- "Warm This Winter" on YouTube

In 2008, The Co-operative Food had Australian singer Gabriella Cilmi remake the song – re-titled "Warm This Winter" – to be played during the company's advertising aired over the holiday season. The track was also played heavily in the Co-operative's stores.

Cilmi's version uses neither of the opening lines from the two intros recorded by Connie Francis instead opening with the lyric: "We met in the winter". An instrumental version of the song continued to be used in advertisements during the non-holiday period (generally February to October) till around 2011.

The original Connie Francis version was pitched to the advertising agency, TBWA Manchester by TBWA's in-house music supervisor Dominic Caisley but was rejected due to the opening lyrics. Caisley suggested a re-record where the lyrics could be altered to suit the creative and a contemporary artist brought in to create a new version of the track.

Included in the deluxe edition release of Cilmi's Lessons to Be Learned album - the deluxe edition being released November 24, 2008 - "Warm This Winter" was made available on December 15, 2008, as an exclusive digital download track to peak at #22 on the UK Singles Chart dated December 27, 2008, outranking Cilmi's precedent physical single "Sanctuary" which had failed to chart in the UK. "Warm This Winter" also bested the #33 UK peak of Cilmi's single "Save the Lies".

The track received enough downloads during the 2009 holiday season to reenter the UK Top 100 Singles chart for three weeks with a #94 peak. Also in 2009 Cilmi's "Warm This Winter" appeared in a TV ad for Orange Romania while in 2011 the track was utilized by Virgin Mobile in their North American TV ad campaign.

=== Charts ===
Chart (2008)	Peak position
UK Singles Chart	22
Chart (2009)	Peak position
European Hot 100 Singles	68

== Other versions ==
Bobby Rydell recorded "I'm Gonna Be Warm This Winter" for his February 1963 album release All the Hits Volume 2 which comprised covers of recent hits, including "Loop de Loop" by Johnny Thunder: Rydell's version of "Loop de Loop" was issued as a single in Europe with his version of "I'm Gonna Be Warm This Winter" as B-side, and "Loop de Loop" did afford Rydell a hit in the Netherlands - ranked as high as #4 in tandem with the Johnny Thunder version - and also on the Dutch charts for Belgium there ranking at #12.

A German version titled "Wir sind das Stadtgespräch" (meaning "We're The Talk Of The Town") was recorded in 1963 by Boy Berger (sometimes also credited as Bert Berger although he is not to be confused with Bert Berger from the German duo Cindy & Bert) and released as Single # U 55 703 on the Telefunken label.

Bunnygrunt recorded the song - as "I Am Gonna Be Warm This Winter" - for the 1997 multi-artist album Christmas in Stereo.

A competing version of 想い出の冬休み (romanized spelling: Omoide No Fuyuyasumi), Connie Francis' Japanese rendering of "I'm Gonna Be Warm This Winter", was recorded by Mieko Hirota in June 1963. Another Japanese rendering: おしゃれ泥棒 (romanized spelling: Oshare Dorobou) (Fashionable thief) was recorded by Wink for their 1989 Especially for You: Yasashisa ni Tsutsumarete album release.

Spanish-language renderings of "I'm Gonna Be Warm This Winter" were recorded in 1963 by Mexican singer Leda Moreno ("Muchacho de ojos verdes" boy with green eyes) and by the Gibraltese duo Albert [Hammond] and Richard: the Diamond Boys ("Que Cosas mi Diras" things that tell me).

Kylie Minogue features a version on her 2015 holiday album Kylie Christmas.
