= If My Pillow Could Talk =

Single by Connie Francis
- A-side: "If My Pillow Could Talk"
- B-side: "You're the Only One Can Hurt Me"
- Released: 1963
- Recorded: 1963
- Genre: Rock and roll
- Length: 2:03
- Label: MGM Records
- Songwriters: Jimmy Steward, Jr. & Robert Mosely
- Producer: Marty Manning

Connie Francis US singles chronology
"Follow the Boys"/ Waiting For Billy" (1963)	"If My Pillow Could Talk" (1963)	"Drownin' My Sorrows" (1963)

"If My Pillow Could Talk" was written by Jimmy Steward, Jr. of the Ravens and Bob Mosley, and was a hit single for Connie Francis.

== Background ==
"If My Pillow Could Talk" was recorded in New York City on March 22, 1963 in a session conducted and arranged by Marty Manning best known for his work with Tony Bennett. As befits its credentials, "If My Pillow Could Talk" had a ragtime feel unexpected in a Connie Francis single. Francis has said she "wasn't crazy" about "If My Pillow Could Talk" but felt it had hit potential largely on account of its title being catchy.

The US B-side of "If My Pillow Could Talk": "You're the Only One Can Hurt Me", was replaced for the single's UK release by "Lollypop Lips" a Stan Vincent and Hank Hunter composition that has gained an unfortunate significance in the Connie Francis canon by virtue of its appearance during an oral sex scene in the 1999 film Jawbreaker which motivated Francis to sue the film's producers. Francis then also sued Universal Music Group (UMG) which had inherited the MGM catalog for allowing her songs to be used in Jawbreaker plus the earlier films Postcards From America and The Craft. The UMG lawsuit was dismissed. (Both "You're the Only One Can Hurt Me" and "Lollypop Lips" were recorded in the same March 22, 1963 recording session as "If My Pillow Could Talk".)

== Chart performance ==
Released in May 1963 after being previewed with a live performance by Francis on The Ed Sullivan Show on 28 April, "If My Pillow Could Talk" did not prove to be the vehicle which might restore Francis' fading chart fortunes. The single peaked outside the Top 20 of the Billboard Hot 100 at the end of June 1963 despite an attempt that month by MGM Records to boost interest with a contest in which disc jockeys solicited letters from listeners describing: "If Your Pillow Could Talk… What Would It Say".^{1}

Francis would never have another Hot 100 peak as high as the #23 peak of "If My Pillow Could Talk". In Cash Box "If My Pillow Could Talk" reached #16 a peak matched by only one of Francis' subsequent chartings: "Blue Winter" in 1964 (#24 in Billboard). In Canada it reached #21.

"If My Pillow Could Talk" was not a widespread international success for Francis: although the track did reach #2 in Hong Kong and peaked at #30 in Australia. The song was one of the few Connie Francis hits which the singer remade in French, that rendering entitled "Oh, oui! J'en ai réve" being recorded July 24, 1963. Francis also recorded a Japanese rendering: 悲しきゴスペル (romanized spelling: Kanashiki gosuperu) (Sad gospel).

Francis' next single: "Drownin' My Sorrows", was a calculated return to the sound of her first #1 hit "Everybody's Somebody's Fool" but became Francis' lowest charting A-side since "I'm Sorry I Made Your Cry" in 1957 with a #36 peak (#34 in Cash Box).

== Cover versions ==
- "Oh, oui! J'en ai réve" was also recorded in 1963 by the French yé-yé group Les Players.
- ^{1}"The listener wins a $100 U.S. Savings Bond, a personal phone call from Connie Francis and a complete library of all [her] albums"; the deejay who intakes the winning entry receives "a seven-day's all expenses paid vacation at Puerto Rico's Americana Hotel". The latter prize was awarded Dick Smith of WROC Radio (Worcester MA). There is no record of the submission from the listener.
