= Bob Bradley (composer) =

British music composer (born 1974)

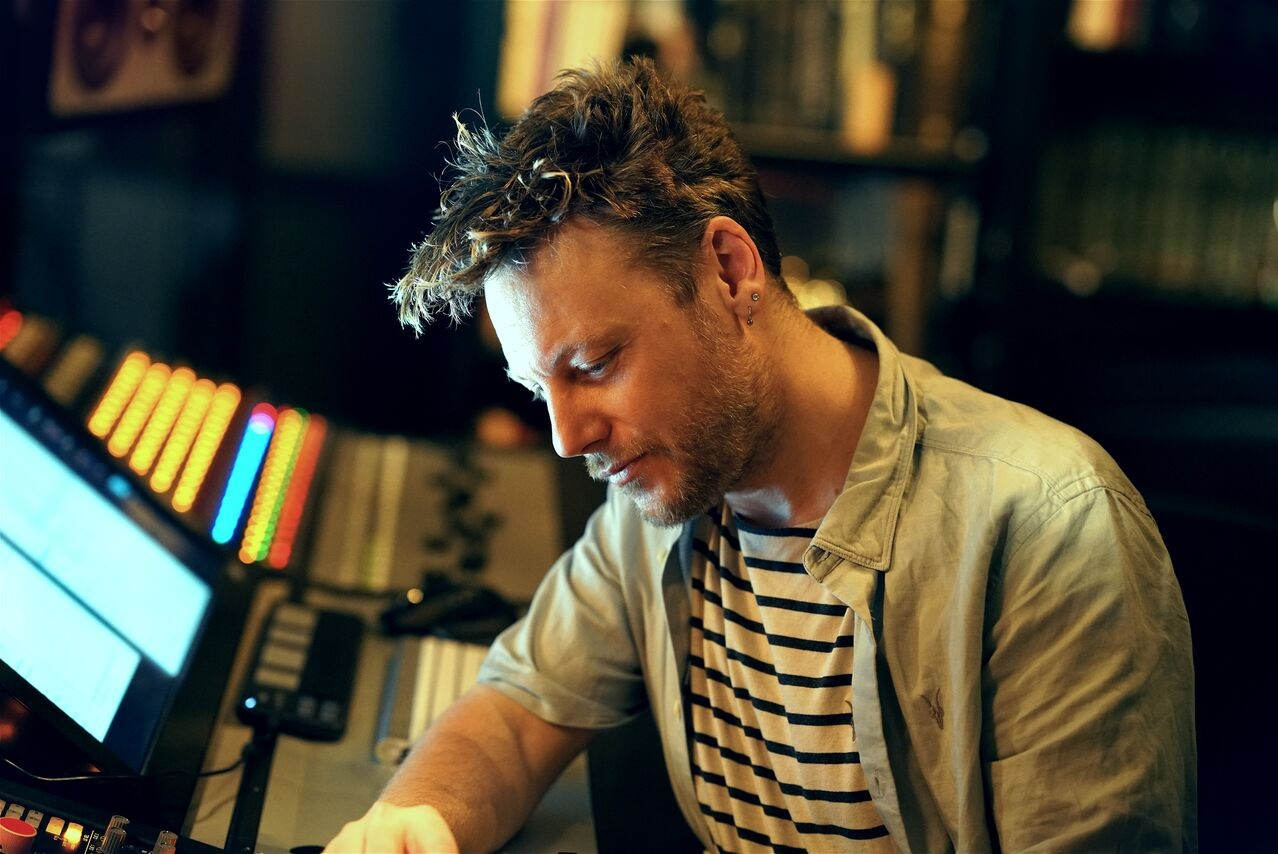
- Bob Bradley at the Black Lodge, Leeds

Background information
- Born: Robert Edward Bradley; 5 February 1974 (age 52)
- Origin: Teesside, England
- Genres: Pop, rock, soundtracks, electronic
- Occupations: Composer, record producer, songwriter, remixer, mixer
- Years active: 1994–present
- Labels: V2, BMG, Universal, Anjunabeats, Audio Network, EMI, Warner, Atlantic

Robert Edward Bradley (born 5 February 1974) is a Grammy Award winning British music composer, producer and songwriter. He is mostly known for producing Above & Beyond's acoustic albums as well as working with the late Jeff Beck on his last recordings. He also creates soundtracks, themes and incidental music for film, television and advertising.

== Career ==
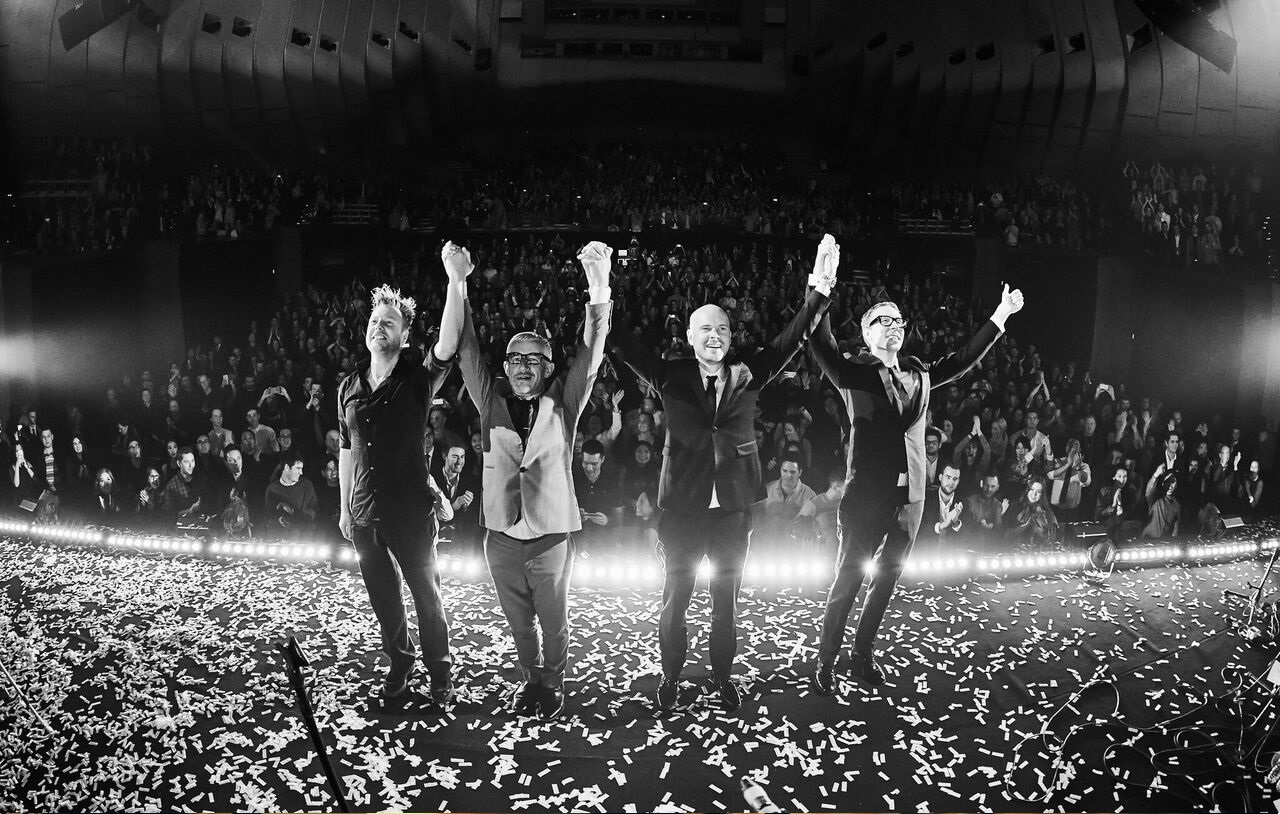
Bradley with Above & Beyond at Sydney Opera House

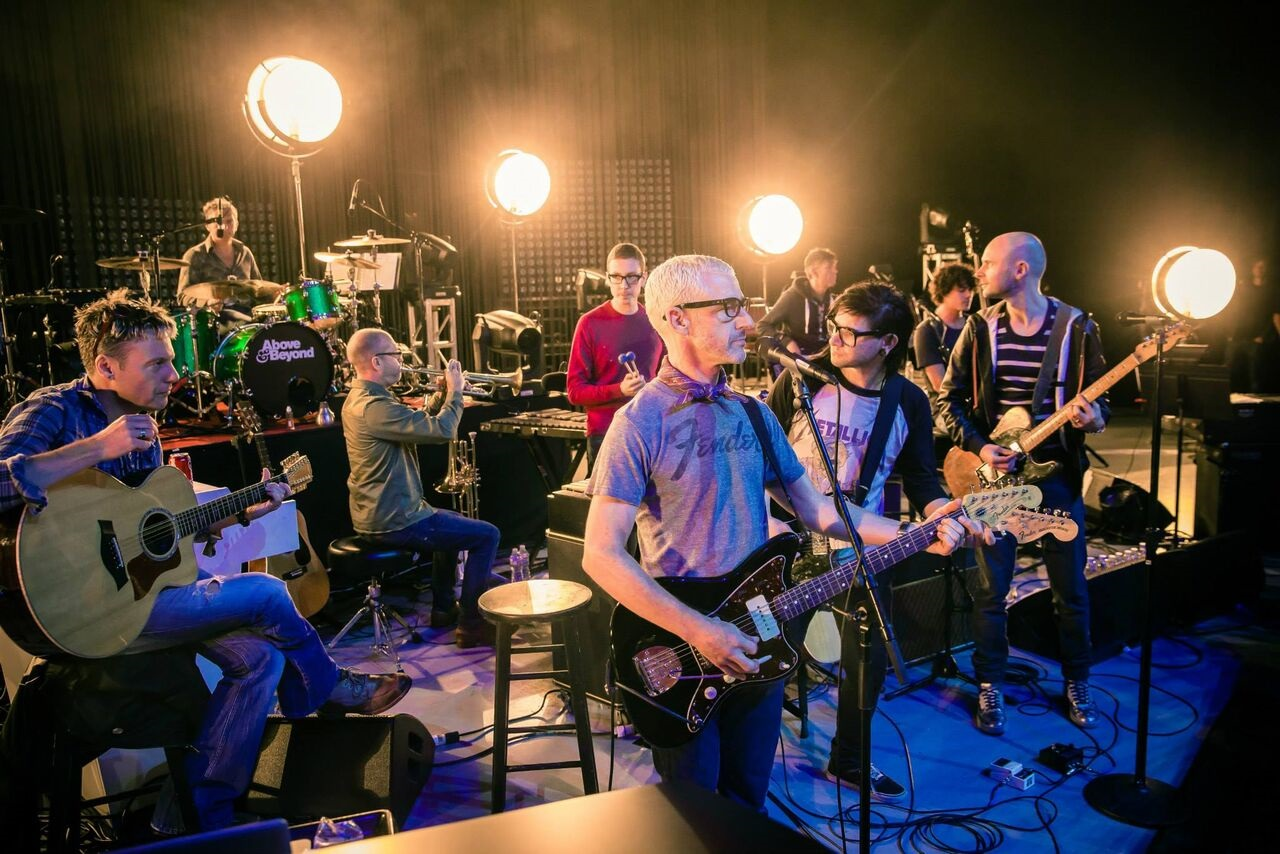
Rehearsal with Skrillex

Bradley started his career as a duet with his brother Peter Bradley Junior who later formed alternative band, Subcircus. They were mentored by the Everly Brothers in their early teens. Bradley later joined the Bristol-based art rock collective the Blue Aeroplanes. After departing from the Blue Aeroplanes, he joined indie darlings The House of Love and recorded an EP with Guy Chadwick under the name the Madonnas.

In 1997, Bradley signed with the newly formed V2 Records with a project called 'Lovebabies'. They released their debut single 'Explore' in the same year. A follow-up single was released in early 1998, "Blue Earth Angel", featuring remixes from Attica Blues, Morcheeba and DJ Pulse. A full-length album was recorded under the title "For The Realization of Zion".

Bradley became one of the original members of the UK production house Xenomania with whom he amassed a long list of pop credits, working with artists such as Sugababes, Girls Aloud, Natalie Imbruglia and Gabriella Cilmi. In 2012, Bradley produced and arranged Above & Beyond's Acoustic album. He brought in singers Alex Vargas and Annie Drury and was also joined by regular contributor Zoë Johnston for the project. The album spawned a succession of live concerts starting at London's Porchester Hall and Los Angeles' Greek Theatre, where they were joined on stage by EDM pioneer Skrillex. The performances were described by Billboard magazine as "one of the finest and more memorable shows in EDM history".

From 2021, Robert recorded some of Jeff Beck's last recordings including the Grammy Award winning record from Ozzy Osbourne as well as developing talent and starting a new project with Yungblud. Robert befriended Johnny Depp and contributed to his album with the late Jeff Beck including Venus in Furs and Killing Joke's Death and resurrection show.

== Personal life ==
Robert Edward Bradley was born on 5 February 1974 in Teesside, England. He now resides in Whitby and Leeds

== Selected works ==
=== Co-written/produced/played ===
| Song | Band/Artist | Label | Year |
|---|---|---|---|
| Acoustic II | Above & Beyond | Anjunabeats | 2016 |
| Acoustic | Above & Beyond | Anjunabeats/Ultra | 2014 |
| Some Day | Annie Drury | Cuckoo Records | 2014 |
| Gimmie that Swing | Cissie Redgwick | Cuckoo Records | 2013 |
| Don't Stop | Little Violet | Cuckoo Records | 2013 |
| Group Therapy | Above & Beyond | Anjunabeats | 2011 |
| Together | Pet Shop Boys | Parlophone | 2010 |
| The Next Generation | Sweetbox | Warner Music Group | 2009 |
| Sirens of the Sea | OceanLab | Anjunabeats | 2009 |
| Lessons to Be Learned | Gabriella Cilmi | Island/Universal | 2008 |
| Destination Unknown | A Cuckoo | Le Grand Magistery | 2008 |
| Overload | Sugababes | Island/Universal | 2006 |
| Taller in More Ways | Sugababes | Island/Universal | 2005 |
| Looking For a Place | Mania | BMG | 2004 |
| The Spin | Jason Downs | Jive | 2003 |
| Three | Sugababes | Island | 2003 |
| Angels with Dirty Faces | Sugababes | Island | 2002 |
| Explore | Lovebabies | V2 | 1997 |
| Rough Music | The Blue Aeroplanes | Beggars Banquet | 1995 |
| Life Model | The Blue Aeroplanes | Beggars Banquet | 1994 |

=== Written or worked with ===
- Brian Higgins - Cher, Kylie Minogue, Texas
- Eg White - Will Young, Adele, James Morrison
- Steve Lee - Britney Spears, Will Young
- Hayden Bell - The Veronicas, Savage Garden
- Tim Powell - Girls Aloud, Sugababes
- Nick Coler - Sugababes, Franz Ferdinand, The KLF
- Tony McGuinness - Above & Beyond, Madonna
- Q - Depeche Mode, Bomb the Bass
- Francis Rossi - Status Quo
- Mike Pelanconi - Lily Allen, Sinéad O'Connor
- Chris James - Craig David
- Niara Scarlett - Mutya Buena, Sugababes

== Awards ==
| Name of award | TV Series | Channel |
|---|---|---|
| Royal Television Society award | Guide to the Cosmos | BBC |
