= Follow the Boys (song) =

Single by Connie Francis

from the album Follow the Boys
- A-side: "Follow the Boys"
- B-side: "Waiting for Billy"
- Released: 1963
- Recorded: 1962
- Genre: Rock and roll
- Length: 2:40
- Label: MGM Records
- Songwriter: Benny Davis/Murray Mencher
- Producer: Danny Davis

Connie Francis US singles chronology
"I'm Gonna Be Warm This Winter" / "Al di là" (1962)	"Follow the Boys" (1963)	"If My Pillow Could Talk" (1963)

"Follow the Boys" is a 1963 romantic ballad written to serve as the theme song for the 1963 comedy film of the same name: the song was introduced in the film by its top billed star: Connie Francis, for whom "Follow the Boys" was a Top 20 hit single.

== Composition and recording ==
Stylistically reminiscent of the hit theme song from Connie Francis' prior film Where the Boys Are, which song had been a Neil Sedaka/ Howard Greenfield co-write, "Follow the Boys" was in fact written by Benny Davis and Murray Mencher (using the pseudonym Ted Murry), veteran songwriters who had been signed to Francis' own music publishing firm Francon Music since 1961, notably writing Francis' 1962 #1 "Don't Break the Heart That Loves You".

Francis made the first recording of "Follow the Boys" in a 30 June 1962 session in Europe during the preproduction of its parent film which would shortly begin shooting on the Riviera, Francis overdubbing her vocals on an instrumental track prepped at Abbey Road Studios in London under the auspices of producer Norman Newell and conductor Geoff Love: this version would play under the film's opening and closing credits. However, on 27 September 1962 Francis recorded a second version for the song's single release in a New York City recording session conducted by LeRoy Holmes, a veteran of the classic MGM musicals: although by 1963 Holmes had left MGM for United Artists film division he returned to MGM to work again with Francis whose 1958 hit "Stupid Cupid" he'd conducted. The Follow the Boys soundtrack album - which comprised the five songs Francis sung in the film plus five new songs (four of them Davis/Mencher co-writes) judged to have a European flavor - featured a third version of the title song, as in a 10 January 1963 Francis had overdubbed a new vocal on the single version's instrumental track.

== Release and impact ==
"Follow the Boys" had its single release the third week of 23 February 1963 parallel with the song's parent film's first screenings, Francis having premiered the song on the 19 February 1963 broadcast of The Jack Benny Program (taped 4 January 1963). Ranked in local hit parades across the US typically peaking in the Top 20, "Follow the Boys" would achieve Top Ten status in Dallas and Philadelphia along with some smaller markets. Nationally "Follow the Boys" peaked at #17 on the Billboard Hot 100 in April 1963 where it would be Francis' final showing in the Top 20. The single was markedly more successful as ranked by Cash Box spending two weeks at No.11.

The B-side of "Follow the Boys", "Waiting For Billy", was also from the film and also a Davis/Mencher co-write, with Dramato Palumbo as additional songwriter: "Billy" refers to the film's character Billy Pulaski, a naval officer (played by Roger Perry) unexpectedly called to Mediterranean duty two hours after his marriage to Francis' character Bonnie, whose yen to share her husband's shore leaves - felt by three other women in regard to their respective mates - formed the film's central plot. "Waiting For Billy" received enough airplay to "bubble under" the Billboard Hot 100 at No. 127.

=== Charts ===
==== Follow the Boys ====
Chart (1963)	Peak position
Canada CHUM Chart	41
Australia Kent Music Report	35
US Billboard Hot 100	17
US Adult Contemporary (Billboard)	7
US Cashbox 100 Top Singles	11
US Record World 100 Top Pops	15

==== Waiting for Billy ====
Chart (1967)	Peak Position
US Bubbling Under Hot 100 Singles	127

== International versions ==
Francis recorded several foreign-language versions of "Follow the Boys" in a 5 February 1963 session at the Sahara Hotel (Las Vegas), overdubbing her vocals on the instrumental track of the English-language single version.

- German: "Mein Schiff fährt zu dir" my ship sails to you
- Italian: "Per sempre con te" forever with you
- French: "En suivant mon Coeur" following my heart (released in
  Canada for the Québécois market
- Spanish: "Detras del amor" behind the love
- Japanese 渚のデイト date of the beach

Unlike the original US release of "Follow the Boys", the foreign-language versions were not coupled with "Waiting for Billy", but with a foreign-language version of "Tonight's my Night", another song from the movie's soundtrack:

- German: "Die Nacht ist mein" In Germany this was the A-Side & peaked
  at #2: "Mein Schiff fährt zu dir" was relegated to the B-Side
- Italian: "Che bella notte"
- Neapolitan Italian: "Che bella notte" (US album release only)
- French: "Décidement"
- Spanish: "Esta es mi noche"
- Japanese 星影で愛して

The Japanese Top Ten chart of international hits as reported by Cash Box ranked 星影で愛して at No. 2 for thirteen weeks in the spring and summer of 1963, Francis' version being ranked in tandem with local covers including those by Michiyo Azusa (ja) and Mieko Hirota, with Francis' version affording the song the majority of its impact.

== Other versions ==
"Follow the Boys" has also been recorded by Clebanoff & his Orchestra (instrumental) (album Today's Best Hits/ 1963) and by Iveta Bartošová (album Closer Now/ 1989). Besides the 1963 local covers of 渚のデイト - see section 1.3 above - the Japanese rendering was recorded in 1970 by Yukari Itō (jp).
