= Hearts Don't Lie =

Single by Gabriella Cilmi

from the album Ten
- Released: 23 April 2010
- Genre: Disco
- Length: 4:04
- Label: Island
- Songwriter(s): Gabriella Cilmi; Miranda Cooper; Brian Higgins; Tim Powell; Owen Parker
- Producer(s): Xenomania

Gabriella Cilmi singles chronology
"On a Mission" (2010)	"Hearts Don't Lie" (2010)	"Defender" (2010)

Music video
- "Hearts Don't Lie" on YouTube

"Hearts Don't Lie" is a song by Australian singer Gabriella Cilmi from her second studio album, Ten (2010). The song was released as the album's second single on 7 June 2010. The music video has a 1970s theme.

== Background and writing ==
Gabriella told Digital Spy music reporter Robert Coopsey that "Hearts Don't Lie has a modern disco sound and a Bee Gees-inspired chorus, it's very groovy and definitely her favourite song on the album." She also talks about the work with Xenomania on the song, saying that "I really like working with Brian [Higgins] because I think he brings out the best in me. On 'Hearts Don't Lie', the funny operatic vocal in the chorus started with me mucking around. He knows how to make my silliness good. Hopefully we can work together again - we did have a few tiffs, because when I'm recording I sulk, but I think it all turned out for the best in the end."

== Critical reception ==
The track received mainly positive reviews from critics. Gerard McGarry of Shout! Music Magazine stated that the song has "got a touch of funk bass, and a great disco beat. Clearly Gabriella's intent on conquering dancefloors across the world with this new sound." Hugh Montgomery of The Observer UK also gave the track a positive review, describing it as a "disco empowerment anthem" where Gabriella's "throaty belter of a voice comes into its own". The music reporter Robert Copsey of Digital Spy gave also a positive review, saying that: "Xenomania supply a trembling bassline that wouldn't sound out of place on a Boney M record", praising too "her glorious falsetto on said chorus is matched by the infectious hook, resulting in a track as catchy as it is downright phonkay". Jon O'Brien from Allmusic enjoyed the track, saying: "Elsewhere, Xenomania's sole contribution, "Hearts Don't Lie," is a funky bass-driven dancefloor filler that could easily have been lifted from the Saturday Night Fever soundtrack".

== Music video ==
The music video was released on 30 April. The video was directed by Emil Nava. Regarding the video, Gabriella has said that: "It was really fun! It was the best time I've ever had on a video shoot actually, because I got all my friends and family in it - my cousin from Australia plays the dark angel. It was actually shot at Brixton Academy, which people are always surprised to hear, but once you take down all the posters and clean the place up a bit, it's got a great Art Deco vibe that fits perfectly with the song."

== Track list ==
Australian iTunes digital download:

1. "Hearts Don't Lie" (Radio Edit) - 3:43

UK Digital download bundle:

1. "Hearts Don't Lie" - 4:05
2. "Hearts Don't Lie" (Moto Blanco Remix) - 7:12
3. "Hearts Don't Lie" (Steve Smart & Westfunk Remix) - 6:55

== Charts ==
Chart (2010)	Peak position
Australian Airplay Chart	51
UK Singles Chart	134
