= Defender (Gabriella Cilmi song) =

Single by Gabriella Cilmi

from the album Ten
- B-side: "Magic Carpet Ride"
- Released: August 26, 2010
- Recorded: 2009
- Genre: Synthpop, ambient, pop rock
- Length: 3:45
- Label: Island
- Songwriters: Gabriella Cilmi, George Astasio, Jason Pebworth, Jon Shave
- Producer: The Invisible Men

Gabriella Cilmi singles chronology
"Hearts Don't Lie" (2010)	"Defender" (2010)	"The Sting" (2013)

Music video
- "Defender" on YouTube

"Defender" is a song by Australian singer–songwriter Gabriella Cilmi, released as the third single from her second studio album Ten. The single release of "Defender" included a cover of Kiki Dee's "Magic Carpet Ride" as a B-side, promotional releases however listed the two songs as a double A-side. It was co-written by Gabriella herself alongside George Astasio, Jason Pebworth and Jon Shave.

== Release ==
"Defender" was released as a digital download on 26 August 2010. The single failed to appear on the UK Singles Chart.

== Critical reception ==
Jon O'Brien from Allmusic said that: "The epic beats of the Dido-esque power 'Defender' offer a respite from the party atmosphere, but as competent as they are, Ten is much more interesting when Cilmi unleashes her previously hidden disco diva tendencies".

== Music video ==
The music video for "Defender" starts off with Cilmi with her back to the camera holding a microphone, a stage light is shining on her and a crowd can be heard cheering and applauding her. The video then cuts to Gabriella sitting and singing in a room wearing a white top; the room seems to be a part of a derelict space station. Clips of her walking through the corridors with a black dress intersect the parts of the video with her in the room. Walking through the corridor, she takes off her jewelry and her dress, undressing to just her underwear and shoes. Water then sprays over her and closeups of Gabriella with wet hair are shown.

Scenes of her in the white top intersect again. Gabriella is seen fully clothed again and she starts to cut her wet hair with a pair of scissors. She then finds some ink in a glass bottle and uses an instrument to tattoo three bars on her wrist. She wraps black material around her wrists and is then seen walking down the corridor again only this time she is holding a katana and she has a scarf around her mouth. The lights then go out in the space station, and Gabriella fades into the darkness.

== Track listings ==
Digital download

1. "Defender"

Digital EP

1. "Defender"
2. "Magic Carpet Ride"
3. "Defender" (Cahill Remix)
