= Ten (Gabriella Cilmi album) =

Studio album by Gabriella Cilmi
- Released: 22 March 2010
- Recorded: 2009–2010
- Genres: Dance-pop; electropop; R&B; disco; new wave; pop rock
- Length: 47:54
- Label: Island
- Producers: Xenomania; Greg Kurstin; The Invisible Men; Dallas Austin; Gabriella Cilmi; Parker & James

Gabriella Cilmi chronology
iTunes Festival: London 2008 (2008)	Ten (2010)	The Sting (2013)

Singles from Ten
- 1. "On a Mission" Released: 5 February 2010; 2. "Hearts Don't Lie" Released: 23 April 2010; 3. "Defender" Released: 26 August 2010

Ten is the second studio album by Australian and Italian singer-songwriter Gabriella Cilmi, released on 22 March 2010. The lead single, "On a Mission", appeared two weeks ahead of the album and marked Cilmi's foray into more 1980s inspired music. Ten is Cilmi's second and final album released under Island Records.

The album peaked in the top 40 in Australia and the UK. PopJustice placed Ten at number 4 on their "Top 33 albums of 2010" list. The album was not released in the United States.

== Background ==
According to Cilmi, Ten features "lots of uptempo funk and disco-inspired numbers designed to make people groove" as well as "some more sexy tracks". One song incorporates a type of yodel into it. While producing the album, Cilmi worked with Greg Kurstin, The Invisible Men and Dallas Austin, as well as Xenomania on the song "Hearts Don't Lie" which she likens to a Bee Gees song. Cilmi has said "Love Me 'Cause You Want To" is the song she's most proud of due to the fact it was produced with her band.

The album's cover was released a few weeks after Cilmi was reported as having criticised Lady Gaga for the skimpy nature of her clothing, the cover of Ten, on which Cilmi appears to be wearing an orange brassiere, overlaid with a black snaky design representative of cinematic film, aroused some interest. Shortly afterwards a further portfolio of photographs was published, for which Cilmi had posed in items of red and black lingerie.

== Critical reception ==
Professional ratings
Review scores
Source	Rating
AllMusic	3.5/5 stars
BBC	(positive)
The Guardian	3/5 stars
The Independent	(negative)
NU.nl	7/10 stars
The Observer	(positive)
Sputnikmusic	3/5 stars
State	1/5 stars
The Times	4/5 stars
Virgin Media	3/5 stars

Overall critical reaction has been generally positive. Hugh Montgomery for The Observer called it "Good, plasticky fun", praising 'Love Me Cos You Want To' and 'Hearts Don't Lie' but criticising the "unnecessary excursions into quivering balladry and jaunty piano-pop". Pete Paphides for The Times also awarded 4 stars, saying "If her current single on a Mission doesn't manage to relieve Cilmi of the 2008 Sweet About Me albatross, then the sensuous future-disco of Love Me Cos should do the trick."

Caroline Sullivan for The Guardian gave Ten 3 stars, saying "Her zest and powerful, Anastacia like voice can't be faulted, but the music, produced mainly by dance-pop overlords Greg Kurstin and Dallas Austin, is woefully generic." BBC Music also praised Cilmi's voice, and said about the album: "Ten still doesn't give too a clear indication of where to place Cilmi as an artist. And while that may infuriate chronic pigeonholers, it's also part of Ten's beauty – it may be a mere stepping stone to something more defined in the bigger picture, but there's an unpredictability and a talent on display that implies she knows exactly where she's going." Pierre Oitmann of Dutch news site Nu.nl cites Gabriella Cilmi as being "every record company mogul's wet dream (...) effortlessly adjusting to the musical genre of choice", and giving the album 7 out of 10 stars.

== Singles ==
The album's lead single, "On a Mission", was released on 5 February 2010 in Australia, and 7 March in the UK. It is accompanied by a £250,000 music video, billed as a homage to Barbarella. The song reached the top 10 on the UK Singles Chart and top 20 on the ARIA Singles Chart, where it was certified Gold. Hearts Don't Lie" was released as the second single, it was released in the UK on 7 June 2010. It performed less successfully, failing to chart in Australia, and reaching a lowly number 134 in the UK. "Defender" was released as the album's third and final single on 30 August 2010 exclusively in the UK, where it failed to appear on the singles chart. Promotional releases of "Defender" issued the single as a double-A Side with its b-side "Magic Carpet Ride", which also appeared as a b-side on "On a Mission" and a bonus track on Ten.

== Track listing ==
No.	Title	Writer(s)	Producer(s)	Length
1.	"On a Mission"	George Astasio; Gabriella Cilmi; Jason Pebworth; Jon Shave	The Invisible Men	3:02
2.	"Hearts Don't Lie"	Cilmi; Miranda Cooper; Brian Higgins; Tim Powell; Owen Parker	Xenomania	4:04
3.	"What If You Knew"	Astasio; Cilmi; Pebworth; Shave; Justin Griffiths; Parker Ighile; Kyle Abrahams	The Invisible Men; Parker & James	2:41
4.	"Love Me Cos You Want To"	Astasio; Cilmi; Pebworth; Shave; Ellie Goulding	The Invisible Men; Cilmi; Lumberjack	4:21
5.	"Defender"	Astasio; Cilmi; Pebworth; Shave	The Invisible Men	3:44
6.	"Robots"	Astasio; Cilmi; Pebworth; Shave; Dan Smith	The Invisible Men	4:01
7.	"Superhot"	Cilmi; Paul Harris; Nick Clow; Luciana; Ian Masterson	Harris; Masterson	3:37
8.	"Boys"	Dallas Austin; Cilmi	Austin	3:50
9.	"Invisible Girl"	Astasio; Cilmi; Pebworth; Shave; Ighile; Abrahams; Rita Ora	The Invisible Men; Parker & James	3:35
10.	"Glue"	Austin	Austin	4:19
11.	"Let Me Know"	Astasio; Cilmi; Pebworth; Shave; Tim Larcombe	The Invisible Men	3:32
12.	"Superman"	Cilmi; James Bourne; Greg Kurstin	Kurstin	3:43
13.	"Sweet About Me" (2010 version) (bonus track)	Cilmi; Cooper; Higgins; Tim Larcombe		3:28

International digital bonus track
No.	Title	Length
14.	"On a Mission" (Wideboys Remix)	7:19

International Spotify bonus track
No.	Title	Length
14.	"Sucker for Love"	3:24

UK digital bonus track
No.	Title	Length
14.	"Magic Carpet Ride"	2:53

iTunes Store bonus content
No.	Title	Length
15.	"Sucker for Love"	3:24
16.	"On a Mission" (music video)	3:06

== Charts ==
Chart (2010)	Peak position
Australian Albums (ARIA)	17
Austrian Albums (Ö3 Austria)	73
Belgian Heatseekers Albums (Ultratop Flanders)	1
Belgian Albums (Ultratop Wallonia)	71
Dutch Albums (Album Top 100)	63
European Albums (Billboard)	74
German Albums (Offizielle Top 100)	61
Greek International Albums (IFPI)	6
Italian Albums (FIMI)	59
Scottish Albums (Official Charts)	28
Swiss Albums (Schweizer Hitparade)	29
UK Albums (Official Charts)	28
