= Lessons to Be Learned =

Studio album by Gabriella Cilmi
- Released: 31 March 2008
- Recorded: 2005–2008; Kent, England
- Length: 37:46 (standard edition)
- Label: Island
- Producers: Brian Higgins; Xenomania

Gabriella Cilmi chronology
| Lessons to Be Learned (2008) | Ronnie Scott's Live Session (2008) |

Alternative cover
- US cover and European deluxe edition cover

Singles from Lessons to Be Learned
- 1. "Sanctuary" Released: 12 December 2007; 2. "Sweet About Me" Released: 10 March 2008; 3. "Don't Wanna Go to Bed Now" Released: 21 July 2008; 4. "Save the Lies" Released: 18 August 2008; 5. "Warm This Winter" Released: 15 December 2008

Lessons to Be Learned is the debut studio album by Australian and Italian singer-songwriter Gabriella Cilmi. It was released in the United Kingdom on 31 March 2008 by Island Records and in Australia on 10 May 2008 by Mushroom Records. Co-written and produced by the team Xenomania, the album takes its title from a line in the song "Sweet About Me", which became a worldwide hit.

== Background ==
Speaking in July 2008 to Pete Lewis of the magazine Blues & Soul, Cilmi explained the meaning behind the album title:

I guess the title 'Lessons To Be Learned' has always been a line that jumped out from the single 'Sweet About Me'. Plus it kinda sums up the whole experience for me, because I've been recording this album for three years - I started when I was 13! So, during its making, I had to learn so many things! I moved from Melbourne to London last year. So I had to learn how to communicate with adults and just get my opinion across really fast, as well as learn just basic everyday things like how to catch tubes!

Several different versions of the album have been released with varying track lists.

== Critical reception ==
Professional ratings
Review scores
| Source | Rating |
|---|---|
| AllMusic | 3/5 stars |
| BBC Music | (mixed) |
| Daily Music Guide | 2/5 stars |
| PopMatters | 3/10 |
| The Times | 4/5 stars |

Lessons to Be Learned received generally mixed reviews from critics. Sharon Mawer from AllMusic called it "a good debut album" and praised Cilmi's "confidence" and range of styles, however did not feel the album was original, saying "it had all been heard before, many times in a crowded market". Mawer also compared her vocals and styles to artists including Anastacia, Joss Stone, Kylie Minogue, and Duffy. Daily Music Guide gave the album a generally mixed-to-negative review, calling "Sweet About Me" "slightly irritating" and also noted "if you expected ["Sweet About Me"] to give you a preview of what her debut album might sound like, you would be wrong". "Save the Lies" and "Sit in the Blues" were considered highlights of the album, while "Awkward Game" and "Einstein" were criticised for having "too much gloss".

Mike Joseph from PopMatters considered Cilmi an Amy Winehouse clone, yet without "a fraction of the wit or lived-in soulfulness that Back to Black (or even Winehouse's debut, Frank) possessed." Joseph also said he found himself "praying Lessons to Be Learned will end quickly". He highlighted "Safer" and "Sit in the Blues", but compared Cilmi negatively to fellow artists such as Winehouse, Adele and Duffy.

== Track listing ==
Standard edition
| No. | Title | Writer(s) | Length |
|---|---|---|---|
| 1. | "Save the Lies" | Gabriella Cilmi; Miranda Cooper; Brian Higgins; Tim Powell; Bob Bradley; Saint Etienne | 3:38 |
| 2. | "Sweet About Me" | Cilmi; Cooper; Higgins; Tim Larcombe | 3:23 |
| 3. | "Sanctuary" | Cilmi; Cooper; Higgins | 3:28 |
| 4. | "Einstein" | Cilmi; Cooper; Higgins; Larcombe | 3:39 |
| 5. | "Got No Place to Go" | Cilmi; Cooper; Higgins; Powell; Nick Coler | 3:23 |
| 6. | "Don't Wanna Go to Bed Now" | Cilmi; Cooper; Higgins; Powell; Coler; Shawn Lee | 3:09 |
| 7. | "Messy" (not included on early printings) | Cilmi; Cooper; Higgins | 3:54 |
| 8. | "Awkward Game" | Cilmi; Cooper; Higgins; Powell; Lee | 3:28 |
| 9. | "Safer" | Cilmi; Cooper; Higgins; Coler; Lee | 3:24 |
| 10. | "Cigarettes and Lies" | Cilmi; Cooper; Higgins | 2:51 |
| 11. | "Terrifying" | Cilmi; Cooper; Higgins | 2:37 |
| 12. | "Sit in the Blues" | Cilmi; Cooper; Higgins; Larcombe; Mike Christer | 3:23 |

Australian bonus track
| No. | Title | Writer(s) | Length |
|---|---|---|---|
| 13. | "Sorry" | Cilmi; Adrian Hannan; Barbara Hannan | 3:29 |

UK and Brazilian bonus track
| No. | Title | Writer(s) | Length |
|---|---|---|---|
| 13. | "Echo Beach" | Mark Gane | 3:27 |

Australian special edition bonus disc
| No. | Title | Writer(s) | Length |
|---|---|---|---|
| 1. | "Sanctuary" (live acoustic) | Cilmi; Cooper; Higgins | 3:32 |
| 2. | "Sweet About Me" (live from the Alice Sessions) | Cilmi; Cooper; Higgins; Larcombe | 3:40 |
| 3. | "Cigarettes and Lies" (live acoustic) | Cilmi; Cooper; Higgins | 3:06 |
| 4. | "Awkward Game" (live acoustic) | Cilmi; Cooper; Higgins; Powell; Lee | 3:45 |
| 5. | "Cry Me a River" (live from the Alice Sessions) | Justin Timberlake; Timothy Mosley; Scott Storch | 3:38 |
| 6. | "Got No Place to Go" (live acoustic) | Cilmi; Cooper; Higgins; Powell; Coler | 3:10 |
| 7. | "Save the Lies" (live acoustic) | Cilmi; Cooper; Higgins; Powell; Bradley; Saint Etienne | 3:35 |
| 8. | "Terrifying" (live acoustic) | Cilmi; Cooper; Higgins | 3:46 |
| 9. | "Safer" (live acoustic) | Cilmi; Cooper; Higgins; Coler; Lee | 3:44 |

European deluxe edition
| No. | Title | Writer(s) | Length |
|---|---|---|---|
| 13. | "Sweet About Me" (acoustic) | Cilmi; Cooper; Higgins; Larcombe | 3:42 |
| 14. | "Cry Me a River" (acoustic) | Timberlake; Mosley; Storch | 3:41 |
| 15. | "Round and Round" | Cilmi; Cooper; Higgins | 3:39 |
| 16. | "Echo Beach" | Gane | 3:21 |

UK deluxe edition
| No. | Title | Writer(s) | Length |
|---|---|---|---|
| 13. | "Sweet About Me" (acoustic) | Cilmi; Cooper; Higgins; Larcombe | 3:42 |
| 14. | "Cry Me a River" (acoustic) | Timberlake, Mosley, Storch | 3:41 |
| 15. | "Round and Round" | Cilmi; Cooper; Higgins | 3:39 |
| 16. | "Warm This Winter" | Hank Hunter; Mark Barkan | 2:31 |
| 17. | "Echo Beach" | Gane | 3:21 |

US edition
| No. | Title | Writer(s) | Length |
|---|---|---|---|
| 1. | "Got No Place to Go" | Cilmi; Cooper; Higgins; Powell; Coler | 3:21 |
| 2. | "Sweet About Me" | Cilmi; Cooper; Higgins; Larcombe | 3:22 |
| 3. | "Sanctuary" | Cilmi; Cooper; Higgins | 3:27 |
| 4. | "Einstein" | Cilmi; Cooper; Higgins; Larcombe | 3:38 |
| 5. | "Save the Lies" | Cilmi; Cooper; Higgins; Powell; Bradley; Saint Etienne | 3:38 |
| 6. | "Round and Round" | Cilmi; Cooper; Higgins | 3:39 |
| 7. | "Awkward Game" | Cilmi; Cooper; Higgins; Powell; Lee | 3:28 |
| 8. | "Cigarettes and Lies" | Cilmi; Cooper; Higgins | 2:51 |
| 9. | "Terrifying" | Cilmi; Cooper; Higgins | 2:37 |
| 10. | "Safer" | Cilmi; Cooper; Higgins; Coler; Lee | 3:24 |
| 11. | "Sit in the Blues" | Cilmi; Cooper; Higgins; Larcombe; Christer | 3:23 |

== Charts ==
=== Weekly charts ===
Weekly chart performance for Lessons to Be Learned
| Chart (2008–2009) | Peak position |
|---|---|
| Australian Albums (ARIA) | 2 |
| Austrian Albums (Ö3 Austria) | 6 |
| Belgian Albums (Ultratop Flanders) | 26 |
| Belgian Albums (Ultratop Wallonia) | 31 |
| Danish Albums (Hitlisten) | 29 |
| Dutch Albums (Album Top 100) | 9 |
| European Top 100 Albums | 16 |
| French Albums (SNEP) | 17 |
| German Albums (Offizielle Top 100) | 10 |
| Irish Albums (IRMA) | 70 |
| Italian Albums (FIMI) | 40 |
| New Zealand Albums (RMNZ) | 6 |
| Norwegian Albums (VG-lista) | 15 |
| Swiss Albums (Schweizer Hitparade) | 7 |
| UK Albums (Official Charts) | 8 |
| US Billboard Top Heatseekers | 17 |

=== Year-end charts ===
Year-end chart performance for Lessons to Be Learned
| Chart (2008) | Position |
|---|---|
| Australian Albums (ARIA) | 13 |
| Austrian Albums (Ö3 Austria) | 65 |
| Dutch Albums (Album Top 100) | 43 |
| French Albums (SNEP) | 134 |
| German Albums (Offizielle Top 100) | 97 |
| Swiss Albums (Schweizer Hitparade) | 28 |
| UK Albums (OCC) | 68 |

== Certifications ==
Certifications for Lessons to Be Learned
| Region | Certification | Certified units/sales |
|---|---|---|
| Australia (ARIA) | Platinum | 70,000^{^} |
| Germany (BVMI) | Gold | 100,000^{^} |
| Netherlands (NVPI) | Gold | 30,000^{^} |
| Switzerland (IFPI Switzerland) | Gold | 15,000^{^} |
| United Kingdom (BPI) | Gold | 100,000^{^} |
^{^} Shipments figures based on certification alone.

== Release history ==
Release history and formats for Lessons to Be Learned
| Region | Date | Label | Format | Catalogue |
|---|---|---|---|---|
| United Kingdom | 31 March 2008 | Island | CD, digital download | 1763307 |
| Australia | 10 May 2008 | Mushroom | CD, digital download | 5144275002 |
| New Zealand | 12 May 2008 | Warner Bros. | CD, digital download | 5144275002 |
| Europe | 20 June 2008 | Island | CD, digital download | 060251773945 |
| Brazil | 10 September 2008 | Universal | CD | 602517739468 |
| Australia (deluxe edition) | 11 October 2008 | Mushroom | CD | 5186504315 |
| Poland | 28 October 2008 | Universal | CD | 1785089 |
| United States | 17 March 2009 | Universal Republic | CD | B0012720-02 |
