= Follow the Boys (album) =

Studio album by Connie Francis
- Released: 1963
- Label: MGM

Follow the Boys, subtitled Connie Francis sings songs from the Metro-Goldwyn-Mayer's presentation of "Follow the Boys", is an album by American singer Connie Francis, released in 1963 by MGM Records.

== Reception ==
Professional ratings
Review scores
Source	Rating
AllMusic	3/5 stars
Billboard	(favorable)

Billboard picked the album for a "Spotlight" review as one with "sufficient sales potential", writing: 'Miss Francis scores again on this set." In addition to the singer's then-current single "Follow the Boys", the magazine's reviewer noted "Tonight's My Night", "Somewhere Near Someplace", and "For Every Young Heart" as some of "the better tracks".

== Track listing ==
LP (MGM E-4123 – mono, SE-4123 – stereo)

Side 1 All of the songs below are from "Follow the Boys"
No.	Title	Writer(s)	Length
1.	"Follow the Boys" (Davis–Murry)		2:40
2.	"Tonight's My Night" (Davis–Murry)		2:30
3.	"Intrigue" (Davis–Murry)		1:55
4.	"Waiting for Billy" (Davis–Murry)		2:20
5.	"Italian Lullaby" (Francis)		3:29
6.	"Intrigue" (Dixieland Version)	Davis–Murry	2:17

Side 2 None of the songs below is from "Follow the Boys"
No.	Title	Length
1.	"For Every Young Heart" (Davis–Murry)	2:48
2.	"On a Little Street in Venice" (Davis–Murry)	2:35
3.	"In Your Arms" (Davis–Murry)	2:00
4.	"Somewhere Near Someplace" (Davis–Murry)	2:35
5.	"My Dearest Possession" (Dragatto–Palumbo)	2:16
6.	"I Can't Reach Your Heart" (Davis–Murry)	2:37

== Charts ==
Chart (1963)	Peak position
US Billboard Top LPs, 150 Best Sellers—Monaural	66
