= Sanctuary (Gabriella Cilmi song) =

Single by Gabriella Cilmi

from the album Lessons to Be Learned
- Released: 12 December 2007
- Genre: Pop
- Length: 3:28
- Label: Island
- Songwriters: Gabriella Cilmi, Miranda Cooper, Brian Higgins, Nick Coler, Tim Powell
- Producers: Brian Higgins, Xenomania

Gabriella Cilmi singles chronology
"Sanctuary" (2007)	"Sweet About Me" (2008)

Music video
- "Sanctuary" on YouTube

"Sanctuary" is the debut single by Australian recording artist Gabriella Cilmi from her debut album, Lessons to Be Learned (2008). The song was first released digitally in the United Kingdom on 12 December 2007 as the album's lead single, and subsequently released in Germany and the Netherlands in December 2008 as its fifth single, reaching number sixty-seven on the German Singles Chart and number seventy-two on the physical sales-based Dutch Single Top 100 chart.

"Sanctuary" utilises the introductory riff of Maxine Brown's 1964 version of "Oh No Not My Baby". Regarding the song's meaning, Cilmi explained, "I met someone who I felt really comfortable with and all those feelings that come with feeling comfortable with someone. The song is kind of about that, although I'm not even friends with that person any more."

== Music video ==
Directed by Michael Baldwin and produced by Charlotte Woodhead, the music video opens with Cilmi in a house where she turns on a reel-to-reel tape player. She then leans on a table followed by her in a garden, then in her bed, then it shows clips of the different places she is, then it shows her in a street twirling her umbrella, then it shows clips of her in these different places, while she is in the house she decides to chuck her scarf on the floor, it shows her in the different places again when several things start to float, in the house her scarf starts to float, upstairs in her bedroom her pen floats so she can write in a book, she sits down on a chair in the house, the telephone starts floating, then she kicks a bunch of leaves, then it shows more clips, then in the house when Cilmi points at something it turns off. It finishes with her closing the door.

== Track listings ==
- UK iTunes single
1. "Sanctuary" – 3:28
2. "Sanctuary" (acoustic version) – 3:30
- German CD single
1. "Sanctuary" (radio edit) – 3:00
2. "Sanctuary" (Pocketknife's Full Length Re-Edit) – 5:32
- German CD maxi single
1. "Sanctuary" (radio edit) – 3:00
2. "Sanctuary" (Pocketknife's Full Length Re-Edit) – 5:32
3. "Sanctuary" (Solitaire Club Mix) – 5:30
4. "Sanctuary" (video) – 3:02
- UK promo remix CD single
1. "Sanctuary" (Mac Project Club Mix) – 8:00
2. "Sanctuary" (Solitaire Club Remix) – 5:28
3. "Sanctuary" (Alex B Club Mix) – 7:57
4. "Sanctuary" (Alex B Dub Mix) – 8:02
5. "Sanctuary" (Alex B Radio Edit) – 3:43
6. "Sanctuary" (Solitaire Radio Edit) – 3:22
7. "Sanctuary" (Mac Project Radio Edit) – 3:33

== Personnel ==
Credits adapted from the liner notes of Lessons to Be Learned.

- Gabriella Cilmi – vocals
- Nick Coler – bass, guitar, keyboards, programming
- Richard Edgeler – mixing assistant
- Brian Higgins – keyboards, production, programming
- Tim Powell – keyboards, programming
- Jeremy Wheatley – mixing
- Xenomania – production

== Charts ==
Chart (2008)	Peak position
Belgium (Ultratip Bubbling Under Flanders)	8
Germany (GfK)	67
Netherlands (Single Top 100)	72

== Release history ==
Region	Date	Label	Format
United Kingdom	12 December 2007	Island	Digital download
Germany	5 December 2008	Universal Music	CD single, CD maxi single, digital download
