= On a Mission (Gabriella Cilmi song) =

Single by Gabriella Cilmi

from the album Ten
- B-side: "On a Magic Carpet Ride"; "On a Mission" (Wideboys Remix)
- Released: 5 February 2010 (Australia); 7 March 2010 (UK)
- Genre: Dance-pop; hi-NRG; electropop; new wave
- Length: 3:03
- Label: Island
- Songwriters: Gabriella Cilmi; George Astasio; Jason Pebworth; Jon Shave
- Producer: The Invisible Men

Gabriella Cilmi singles chronology
"Warm This Winter" (2008)	"On a Mission" (2010)	"Hearts Don't Lie" (2010)

Music videos
- "On a Mission" on YouTube; "On a Mission" (Wideboys remix) on YouTube; "On a Mission" (Riffs and Rays remix) on YouTube

"On a Mission" is a song by Australian singer-songwriter Gabriella Cilmi from her second studio album, Ten (2010). The song was released as the album's lead single in Australia on 5 February 2010 and in the United Kingdom on 7 March 2010. The song has been praised by music critics for its disco/electronic-oriented sound. Its accompanying music video was directed by Michael Gracey and is heavily inspired by the 1968 science fiction film Barbarella. A remix of the song features American rapper Eve.

== Background ==
In an interview with Digital Spy music editor Nick Levine, Cilmi said, "I guess it will surprise people who thought I was going to make 'Sweet About Me' part two. I surprised myself when I recorded 'On a Mission' and it totally shifted the whole album in a new direction. I've loved playing it to all my friends and watching their reactions—they certainly weren't expecting it either." She added, "I like to think of it as 'I Will Survive' for the 21st century. It's about unleashing your inner superhero and doing what you gotta do to get where you need to be - no matter how many brick walls you have to smash along the way. I really wanted to make a track with a disco influence too and something that would go OFF live! And it's not just for women—I actually co-wrote it with a big bald guy!"

In an interview with BBC News, Cilmi also admitted to borrowing the bassline from Joe Jackson's hit single "Steppin' Out". This is especially obvious in the song's introduction.

== Critical reception ==
The song has received generally positive reviews from music critics. Jon O'Brien from Allmusic said that: " The lead single "On a Mission," a gloriously camp retro-fueled anthem, manages to evoke the spirit of Olivia Newton-John's "Xanadu," Toni Basil's "Mickey," and the Bangles' "Walk Like an Egyptian," all in one Hi-NRG three-minute song. It's a bold statement of intent that indicates from the offset that far from the half-expected tortured singer/songwriter vibe, Ten is only concerned with having fun". Nick Levine from Digital Spy reviewed the song positively, stating that "it's a proper pop stomper that sounds like something the Pointer Sisters could have had a hit with in 1982. Well, kind of. There are Casio-ish synths on the verses, the bridges take the song into disco territory, and it's got a big, guitar-driven chorus that grabs you on first listen." Later, he gave to the song 4 stars (out of 5) and completes the review, saying that the song is "instantly satisfying, moreish too and just as cheesy as it needs to be". Popjustice named "On a Mission" their Song of the Day on 6 January 2010, further commenting that the song sounds like "a chart-friendly mix of Blondie, Joan Jett, Van Halen and Lil' Chris." It also was ranked the 45th best single of 2010 by Popjustice.

== Chart performance ==
The song was the number-one most added track to Australian radio in its second week of release, getting played 296 times.

On 10 March 2010, midweek sales estimated that "On a Mission" would debut on the UK Singles Chart at number seven. However, on 14 March 2010, the single debuted at number nine. Nevertheless, this made "On a Mission" Cilmi's second UK top 10 hit since her debut single, "Sweet About Me". During its second week in the chart, the single fell eight places to number 17.

== Music video ==
The music video was uploaded onto Cilmi's official YouTube channel on 11 January 2010. It features many green screen shots of Cilmi, in a space suit, space helmet and on another planet, accompanied by several scantily clad dancers. The video gained mainly positive reviews and it was an expensive shoot with "On a Mission" costing more than all her other videos combined. There was some controversy over the video, due to a scene which featured Cilmi seemingly half naked. Cilmi strongly denied this however for she said it was just the type of dress she was wearing.

On the idea behind the video, Cilmi explained:

A director called Michael Gracey did the video. When he presented the idea to me, I was won over straight away. I always had a thing for Jane Fonda in Barbarella! She was my inspiration when we were shooting the video and I really did get into character. I'm sure you'll see a bit more dancing from me—though I'm not sure you'd call it dancing, more bopping and jolting!

== Track listings ==
CD single

1. "On a Mission" – 3:03
2. "On a Mission" (featuring Eve)
3. "On a Magic Carpet Ride"

iTunes Single

1. "On a Mission" – 3:03
2. "On a Mission" (Wideboys Remix) – 7:20

Download bundle

1. "On a Mission" (featuring Eve)
2. "On a Mission" (featuring H-Boogie)
3. "On a Mission" (Riff & Rays Remix)
4. "On a Mission" (Wideboys Remix featuring Eve)

== Charts and certifications ==
=== Charts ===
Chart (2010)	Peak position
Australia (ARIA)	16
Austria (Ö3 Austria Top 40)	63
Belgium (Ultratip Bubbling Under Flanders)	6
Belgium (Ultratip Bubbling Under Wallonia)	6
Czech Republic Airplay (ČNS IFPI)	53
European Hot 100 Singles (Billboard)	30
Finland (Suomen virallinen lista)	11
Germany (GfK)	84
Hungary (Rádiós Top 40)	29
Netherlands (Dutch Top 40)	30
Slovakia Airplay (ČNS IFPI)	18
UK Singles (OCC)	9

=== Year-end charts ===
Chart (2010)	Position
Italy Airplay (EarOne)	36
UK Singles Chart	182

=== Certifications ===
Country	Certification
Australia	Gold
