= Don't Wanna Go to Bed Now =

2008 single by Gabriella Cilmi

Single by Gabriella Cilmi

from the album Lessons to Be Learned
- Released: 21 July 2008
- Genre: Pop rock; funk rock
- Length: 3:10 (album version); 3:17 (video edit)
- Label: Mushroom
- Songwriters: Gabriella Cilmi; Nick Coler; Miranda Cooper; Brian Higgins; Tim Powell; Shawn Lee
- Producers: Brian Higgins; Xenomania

Gabriella Cilmi singles chronology
"Sweet About Me" (2008)	"Don't Wanna Go to Bed Now" (2008)	"Save the Lies" (2008)

Music video
- "Don't Wanna Go to Bed Now" on YouTube

"Don't Wanna Go to Bed Now" is a song by Australian singer–songwriter Gabriella Cilmi from her debut album, Lessons to Be Learned (2008). Written by Cilmi, Nick Coler, Miranda Cooper, Brian Higgins, Tim Powell, and Shawn Lee, the track was released as the album's second Australian single on 21 July 2008. It debuted at number thirty-one on the Australian ARIA Singles Chart the week of 28 July 2008. Despite only attaining a peak position of number twenty-eight, "Don't Wanna Go to Bed Now" became Australia's twenty-fourth best-selling single of 2008 by a native artist. The song appears on the soundtrack to the Australian crime television series City Homicide.

In the music video Cilmi is seen partying all night holding and popping balloons, while singing in different rooms and outfits.

== Track listing ==
Australian CD single

1. "Don't Wanna Go to Bed Now" (single version) – 3:13
2. "Sweet About Me" (live version) – 3:40
3. "Cry Me a River" (live version) – 3:39

== Charts ==
=== Weekly charts ===
Chart (2008)	Peak position
Australia (ARIA)	28

=== Year-end charts ===
Chart (2008)	Position
Australian Artists (ARIA)	24
