= The Sting (Gabriella Cilmi album) =

Studio album by Gabriella Cilmi
- Released: 8 November 2013
- Recorded: 2011–2013
- Length: 45:19
- Label: Sweetness Tunes
- Producer: Eliot James

Gabriella Cilmi chronology
Ten (2010)	The Sting (2013)

Singles from The Sting
- 1. "The Sting" Released: 1 September 2013; 2. "Symmetry" Released: 11 November 2013

The Sting is the third studio album by Australian and Italian singer Gabriella Cilmi, released on 8 November 2013 on Cilmi's imprint Sweetness Tunes, through Absolute Marketing & Distribution. The Sting marks Cilmi's first independently released LP after parting ways with Island Records in 2010 following her second album Ten.

== Background ==
The writing process of The Sting has lasted over three years. Cilmi had begun work on it by October 2010, mere months after the release of her second album, Ten. Teasing some information about lyrics, several ideas and feelings, she spoke on her work, saying, "It's totally exciting because I am spending a bit more time with this record. I want to see what works. I really love Dolly Parton, roots music, Tricky and Enya, so anything could happen."

On 18 January 2012, Cilmi debuted a Sam Wrench-directed video for an "acoustic-ish" version of "Vicious Love", the first song she wrote for the album. Cilmi explained, "If you've ever experienced any type of 'Vicious Love' you will know that sometimes despite all the arrows pointing to a dead end there is just no way out, there is no way back. But then again don't all roads lead to dead ends? [...] Guess we should just enjoy the ride..."

Gabriella began writing and recording with members of her live band in Brooklyn, New York. "I was searching for a sound that reflected the way I felt inside, which was quite vulnerable, and traumatised. I wanted it to sound the way Italian neo-realist photographs look, that post-war, ruined glamour which is really gritty and heart-breaking. I was listening to a lot of Trip Hop, that 90s Bristol sound, Portishead and Tricky. But also singer-songwriters I had always loved, Neil Young, John Martyn. And old soul records, Bessie Smith, Otis Redding. It all went in there." In an interview with Billboard about the process of making 'The Sting', Gabriella stated, "The whole idea of 'The Sting' came as an aftermath to breaking-up with my label, and management and boyfriend at the time. The lyrics side of things were influenced by what I was going through. It was all a bit of a sting. But nothing killed me." Cilmi characterized the album's lyrical content as deeply confessional, stating that it felt like "something I'd hand into a priest if I was going in for confession".

== Promotion ==
A black-and-white music video for "Sweeter in History", filmed in the Italian towns of Valvori and Cassino, was released on 14 March 2013. On 26 March, the track was offered as a free download for a limited time.

"The Sting" was released on 1 September 2013 as the album's official lead single, for which a music video was also directed by Wrench.

"Vicious Love" was released on 23 October 2013 as the third extract from The Sting. It was released as a promotional single, for free with the pre-sale of the record. An acoustic music video was released in 2012.

The second single, "Symmetry", was released on 11 November 2013. The accompanying music video premiered on 17 September.

In 2013, Cilmi performed a series of intimate promotional shows in the United Kingdom, including a concert at St. Pancras Church in London.

== Critical reception ==
Writing for The Guardian, Michael Cragg described the album's lead single "The Sting" as a soulful departure from Cilmi's earlier electropop sound, noting the presence of "bitterness" in its tone and praising its "smokey, soulful vocal" delivery. He highlighted the song's extended bee metaphor and described its chorus as "a joy", commending its blend of church organ and strings while suggesting the track demonstrated that Cilmi had "lost none of her pop nous".

Reviewing the album for Female First, the publication awarded The Sting three out of five stars, praising Cilmi's "dulcet and distinguished" vocals and highlighting tracks such as "Highway", "Symmetry" and "Don't Look Back" as standouts. However, the review suggested that the second half of the album lost momentum and commented that the record could have benefited from a shorter tracklist.

== Track listing ==
All tracks are produced by Eliot James.

No.	Title	Writer(s)	Length
1.	"Highway"	Gabriella Cilmi; James; Adrian Thaws	3:40
2.	"Symmetry"	Cilmi; Tom Fuller	3:51
3.	"Sweeter in History"	Cilmi; Fuller	3:22
4.	"Don't Look Back"	Cilmi; James	3:47
5.	"Not Sorry"	Cilmi; James; Joseph Cilmi	3:52
6.	"Left with Someone Else"	Cilmi; Benjamin Weaver	3:17
7.	"The Sting"	Cilmi; James; Weaver	3:25
8.	"Vicious Love"	Cilmi; Adam Coney; Harry Broadbent; Bongani Bhebhe	3:45
9.	"Every Memory"	Cilmi; Jony Rockstar	3:01
10.	"I Am Just a Girl"	Cilmi; Ryan Laubscher	3:43
11.	"Parallel Universe"	Cilmi; Coney; Broadbent; Bhebhe	3:49
12.	"Kill Ourselves"	Cilmi; Weaver	3:24
13.	"Deep Water" (hidden track)	Cilmi; James	2:27
Total length:			45:19

== Release history ==
Region	Date	Format(s)	Label
Ireland	8 November 2013	CD, digital download	Sweetness Tunes
Australia	11 November 2013	Digital download	Sweetness Tunes
France	11 November 2013	Digital download	Sweetness Tunes
Italy	11 November 2013	Digital download	Sweetness Tunes
United Kingdom	11 November 2013	CD, digital download	Sweetness Tunes
United States	11 November 2013	Digital download	Sweetness Tunes
