= Sweet About Me =

2008 single by Gabriella Cilmi

Single by Gabriella Cilmi

from the album Lessons to Be Learned
- Released: 10 March 2008
- Genre: Pop; swing jazz
- Length: 3:23
- Label: Warner Music Australia, Island
- Songwriters: Gabriella Cilmi, Miranda Cooper, Brian Higgins, Tim Larcombe, Nick Coler, Tim Powell
- Producers: Brian Higgins, Xenomania

Gabriella Cilmi singles chronology
| "Sanctuary" (2007) | "Sweet About Me" (2008) | "Don't Wanna Go to Bed Now" (2008) |

Music videos
- "Sweet About Me" on YouTube; "Sweet About Me" (Sunship remix) on YouTube

"Sweet About Me" is a song by Australian singer-songwriter Gabriella Cilmi from her debut album, Lessons to Be Learned (2008). The song was released as the album's second single on 10 March 2008 in the United Kingdom and on 24 March 2008 in Australia. One month later, it topped the Australian ARIA Singles Chart and stayed there for five non-consecutive weeks.

"Sweet About Me" also became a hit in Europe, reaching number one in the Netherlands and Norway and becoming a top-five hit in eight other countries. In the UK, the song reached number six and was the most-played track of 2009 according to PRS for Music. The song won the Grand Prix during the 46th Sopot International Song Festival in 2009. A 2010 mix of "Sweet About Me" was included on Cilmi's second album, Ten, released in March 2010.

== Background ==
"['Sweet About Me'] just sounds so fun, I imagine it playing in a bar. It'd be the perfect soundtrack for going on dates and playing footsies beneath the table. Or just going out and having fun!."

— Gabriella Cilmi, talking about her debut single "Sweet About Me".

Recording of Lessons to Be Learned, the parent album of "Sweet About Me," began in Melbourne, Australia, when Gabriella Cilmi was thirteen years-old. Cilmi then re-located to London, England in 2007 to launch her musical career and complete the recording of "Sweet About Me". The song was co-written by Cilmi in collaboration with its producers Xenomania, who are critically acclaimed for their work with Girls Aloud, Sugababes and Kylie Minogue. "Sweet About Me" was written after Cilmi was pillaging a Parisian record store for inspiration. Cilmi was listening to early psychedelic music around the time when she wrote the song. Lyrically, Cilmi said that the song is saying, "We're all going to make mistakes, so we might as well have fun while we're making them." Cilmi explained "Sweet About Me" to Bob Henderson of Gay Times, "['Sweet About Me' is about] nothing being what it seems. This might sound cheesy as well, but just because I'm young doesn't mean I don't understand what's going on."

Described as a "soulful pop song" by contemporary critics, Cilmi revealed to Pete Lewis of Blues & Soul that the "fun" inspiration in "Sweet About Me" originated from her mother's love for 1970s British glam-rock bands, Sweet and T. Rex. During the recording of "Sweet About Me", Cilmi thought there was something "amazing" about the song. Speaking to WalesOnline she said, "I thought it was like a nursery rhyme, the way it got stuck in your head." Cilmi, who is influenced by rock bands Led Zeppelin and Kings of Leon, said she had to make a pop-sounding record to appeal to as many people as possible. Speaking to music website, The Digital Fix, Cilmi explained how she worked together with Brian Higgins on "Sweet About Me":

Even though we came from two totally different backgrounds, when we worked together it just gelled. When it came to our differences I guess we both kind of compromised and came to a decision in the middle.

== Composition ==
"Sweet About Me"
A sample of "Sweet About Me", where Cilmi sings the bridge, which includes the line described as lyrically bitter by Nick Levine of Digital Spy, "When you're playing with desire, don't come running to my place when it burns like fire, boy".

"Sweet About Me" is a pop and swing jazz song. It utilizes a subtle electro beat, derived from rocksteady grooves interspersed with layered pop production, and "retro-sounding" contemporary themes. The song has received different lyrical interpretations from critics. A writer from Contactmusic.com felt the song refers to making trouble and getting away with it, Nick Levine of Digital Spy noted that the song sounds lyrically bitter, namely in the line. "When you're playing with desire, don't come running to my place when it burns like fire boy'. According to Cilmi the lyrics are representative of having fun while making your mistakes, and learning from them along the way. "Sweet About Me" is written in the time signature of common time, with a beat rate of 132 beats per minute.

Cilmi uses a sweet and coarse vocal delivery which has been deemed as a misleading contrast between her mature sound and young age. Her vocal performance on the song is similar to that of a group act rather than that of a solo artist. She claims that the track's sound was a product of Xenomania's pop music experience and her lyrical ideas. While the song was being crafted she was influenced by rock bands Kings of Leon and Jet, "I wrote with [Xenomania] who are totally different to me and came from a totally different musical background, they had worked with a lot of pop acts before and at the time I was listening to a lot of Jet and Kings of Leon, so when both our ideas met we came up with something pretty good." Musically, the song has been compared to Amy Winehouse's 2007 single, "Rehab", for their similar composition, soul and swing musical influences.

There are two versions of the song: the album version and the radio edit. The first verse is cut in half in the radio edit and the song opens up with the lyrics: "Oh, watching me hanging by a string this time" followed by "Oh, easily climax of a perfect lie". In the album version, there is a repetition of the first line followed by the line: "Don't, easily a smile worth a hundred lies"; the radio edit omits these two lines before going into the pre-chorus.

== Critical reception ==
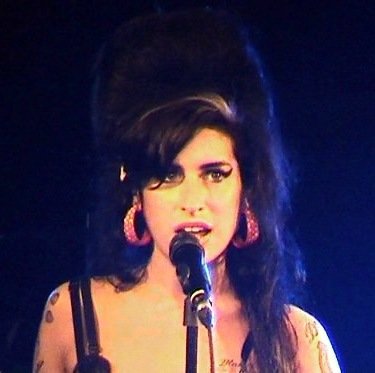
Cilmi's performance was viewed by contemporary critics as similar to Amy Winehouse (pictured).

Nick Levine from Digital Spy positively reviewed "Sweet About Me," giving it four out of five stars. Levine commended Xenomania's production on the track, calling it "authentic" and "fresh". He also praised Gabriella Cilmi's vocals on the song, "Most impressive of all is Cilmi's voice, which manages to be sweet and coarse all at the same time, much like a drizzling of honey on a slice of toast." Jake Taylor of Sputnikmusic deemed "Sweet About Me" as one of the best songs released by an Australian artist on debut. He wrote, "A lot of songs focus on the chorus as the returning point for the listener's attention, but 'Sweet About Me' dumps that for a well rounded mix of brilliant singing and layered pop production on all levels." Contactmusic.com complimented "Sweet About Me" saying it brings a little fun back to pop. The song received a four-out-of-five star rating from Fraser McAlpine of the BBC, who compared Cilmi to British singers Amy Winehouse and Duffy, "Perky song, this. Well suited to grabbing your attention even in the middle of the sudden run of post-[Amy Winehouse] soul sirens, largely because it swings a bit, and seems to have some spark of its own, rather than stiffly wearing its '60s influences like a pair of slightly-too-small cuban heeled boots [similar to that of Duffy]." Mark Reid of The New Zealand Herald described the track as "incredibly catchy". The song was classed as an obvious highlight on Lessons to Be Learned by Colin Polonowski of The Digital Fix. Andrew Cock of The Dwarf said that "Sweet About Me" is as catchy as ever and will continue to receive wide public acclaim. Cock noted, "At times this song seems so sweet it oozes honey, feeling deliberately boppy." Cilmi's vocal performance on the song was praised by Paul Cashmere of Undercover FM, "From the sultry opening notes of the debut single 'Sweet About Me', the world will quickly come to know it's uncovered a major new vocal talent in Gabriella Cilmi."

Elisabeth Vincentelli from Time Out ranked "Sweet About Me" as the best song of 2008. Vincentelli wrote, "Production team Xenomania crafted a typically ace tune for this 17-year-old Aussie, and her unassumingly sexy delivery brought it all home." "Sweet About Me" was nominated in the category 'Most Performed Work' at the Ivor Novello Awards. The song won 'Single of the Year' at the 2008 ARIA Awards.

== Chart performance ==
On 14 April, the song topped the ARIA Singles Chart and is certified platinum for sales of 70,000 copies. It reached number one again on 19 May, where it sat for four weeks, while her debut album reached number two on the albums chart. This makes her the youngest Australian artist to reach the top of the charts, beating out Australian Idol winner Casey Donovan by just nineteen days. On 27 October 2008, "Sweet About Me" re-entered the Australian chart at number seventeen. The song would ultimately become the third highest-selling single of 2008 in Australia.

On 9 March 2008, "Sweet About Me" debuted on the UK Singles Chart at number 68, rising to its peak position of number six on 21 June 2008 in its fifteenth week on the run. On 20 July, months after its release, the song reached number two on the UK Airplay Chart. On 2 August, the song managed to return to the Top Ten by climbing five spots from number twelve to number seven. However, the following week, the song fell back to number twelve, then eventually dropped out of the top 40 six weeks later. It re-entered the top forty on 5 October rising from number 65 to number thirty-eight. The song spent thirty-seven consecutive weeks on the UK Singles Chart before finally dropping out on 23 November. Cilmi recorded a performance of the song for a Christmas revival of the axed music show Top of the Pops, which aired on Christmas Day 2008 on BBC One. "Sweet About Me" became the UK's 26th best-selling single of 2008.

== Track listings and formats ==
German CD single

1. "Sweet About Me" (radio edit)
2. "Sweet About Me" (Sunship Vocal Mix)
3. "Sweet About Me" (Matthew Herbert's Savoury Mix)
4. "Sweet About Me" (Ashley Beedle Vocal Mix)
5. "Sweet About Me" (Truth & Soul Mix)

UK and Australian CD single

1. "Sweet About Me" (radio edit)
2. "Echo Beach"
3. "This Game"

UK re-release CD single

1. "Sweet About Me" (radio edit)
2. "Sweet About Me" (Robbie Rivera Remix)

iTunes remix and live EP

1. "Sweet About Me" (Sunship Vocal Mix)
2. "Sweet About Me" (Matthew Herbert's Savoury Mix)
3. "Sweet About Me" (Ashley Beedle Vocal Mix)
4. "Sweet About Me" (Truth & Soul Mix)
5. "Sweet About Me" (Later with Jools Holland)

== Personnel ==
- Produced by Brian Higgins and Xenomania
- Mixed by Jeremy Wheatley, assisted by Richard Edgeler
- Vocals: Gabriella Cilmi
- Keyboards: Brian Higgins, Tim Larcombe, Tim Powell
- Drums: Marc Parnell
- Guitars: Nick Coler, Jason Resch
- Bass: Kieran Jones
- Cello: Nick Squires
- Vibes and xylophone: Brian Higgins, Nick Coler
- Harmonica: Mark Feltham
- Programmed by Tim Powell and Brian Higgins

== Charts ==
=== Weekly charts ===
| Chart (2008–2009) | Peak position |
|---|---|
| Australia (ARIA) | 1 |
| Austria (Ö3 Austria Top 40) | 2 |
| Belgium (Ultratop 50 Flanders) | 3 |
| Belgium (Ultratop 50 Wallonia) | 3 |
| Czech Republic Airplay (ČNS IFPI) | 2 |
| Denmark (Tracklisten) | 5 |
| Europe (European Hot 100 Singles) | 2 |
| Finland (Suomen virallinen lista) | 20 |
| France (SNEP) | 9 |
| Germany (GfK) | 2 |
| Germany Airplay (BVMI) | 2 |
| Hungary (Rádiós Top 40) | 2 |
| Ireland (IRMA) | 16 |
| Italy (FIMI) | 4 |
| Netherlands (Dutch Top 40) | 2 |
| Netherlands (Single Top 100) | 1 |
| New Zealand (Recorded Music NZ) | 6 |
| Norway (VG-lista) | 1 |
| Scottish Singles Sales (Official Charts) | 18 |
| Slovakia Airplay (ČNS IFPI) | 21 |
| Sweden (Sverigetopplistan) | 25 |
| Switzerland (Schweizer Hitparade) | 2 |
| UK Singles (Official Charts) | 6 |
| US Pop 100 (Billboard) | 99 |

=== Year-end charts ===
| Chart (2008) | Position |
|---|---|
| Australia (ARIA) | 3 |
| Austria (Ö3 Austria Top 40) | 10 |
| Belgium (Ultratop 50 Flanders) | 18 |
| Belgium (Ultratop 50 Wallonia) | 27 |
| Croatia International Airplay (HRT) | 4 |
| Europe (European Hot 100 Singles) | 10 |
| France (SNEP) | 79 |
| Germany (Media Control GfK) | 10 |
| Netherlands (Dutch Top 40) | 3 |
| Netherlands (Single Top 100) | 2 |
| New Zealand (RIANZ) | 45 |
| Switzerland (Schweizer Hitparade) | 4 |
| UK Singles (OCC) | 26 |

| Chart (2009) | Position |
|---|---|
| Europe (European Hot 100 Singles) | 83 |
| Hungary (Rádiós Top 40) | 2 |
| Switzerland (Schweizer Hitparade) | 93 |

=== Decade-end charts ===
| Chart (2000–2009) | Position |
|---|---|
| Australia (ARIA) | 28 |
| Australian Artists (ARIA) | 5 |
| Germany (Media Control GfK) | 41 |

== Certifications ==
| Region | Certification | Certified units/sales |
|---|---|---|
| Australia (ARIA) | Platinum | 70,000^{^} |
| Belgium (BRMA) | Gold | |
| Denmark (IFPI Danmark) | Platinum | 15,000^{^} |
| Germany (BVMI) | Platinum | 300,000^{^} |
| Italy | — | 45,000 |
| New Zealand (RMNZ) | Gold | 7,500^{*} |
| Switzerland (IFPI Switzerland) | Platinum | 30,000^{^} |
| United Kingdom (BPI) | Gold | 400,000^{‡} |
^{*} Sales figures based on certification alone.^{^} Shipments figures based on certification alone.^{‡} Sales+streaming figures based on certification alone.

== Release history ==
| Region | Date | Format(s) | Label(s) | Ref. |
|---|---|---|---|---|
| United Kingdom | 10 March 2008 | Digital download | Island | |
| Australia | 24 March 2008 | CD | Warner Music Australia | |
| United States | 11 January 2009 | Radio | Universal Republic | |

== See also ==
- List of number-one singles in Australia in 2008
- List of number-one hits in Norway
