= Gabriella Cilmi =

Australian pop singer and songwriter (born 1991)

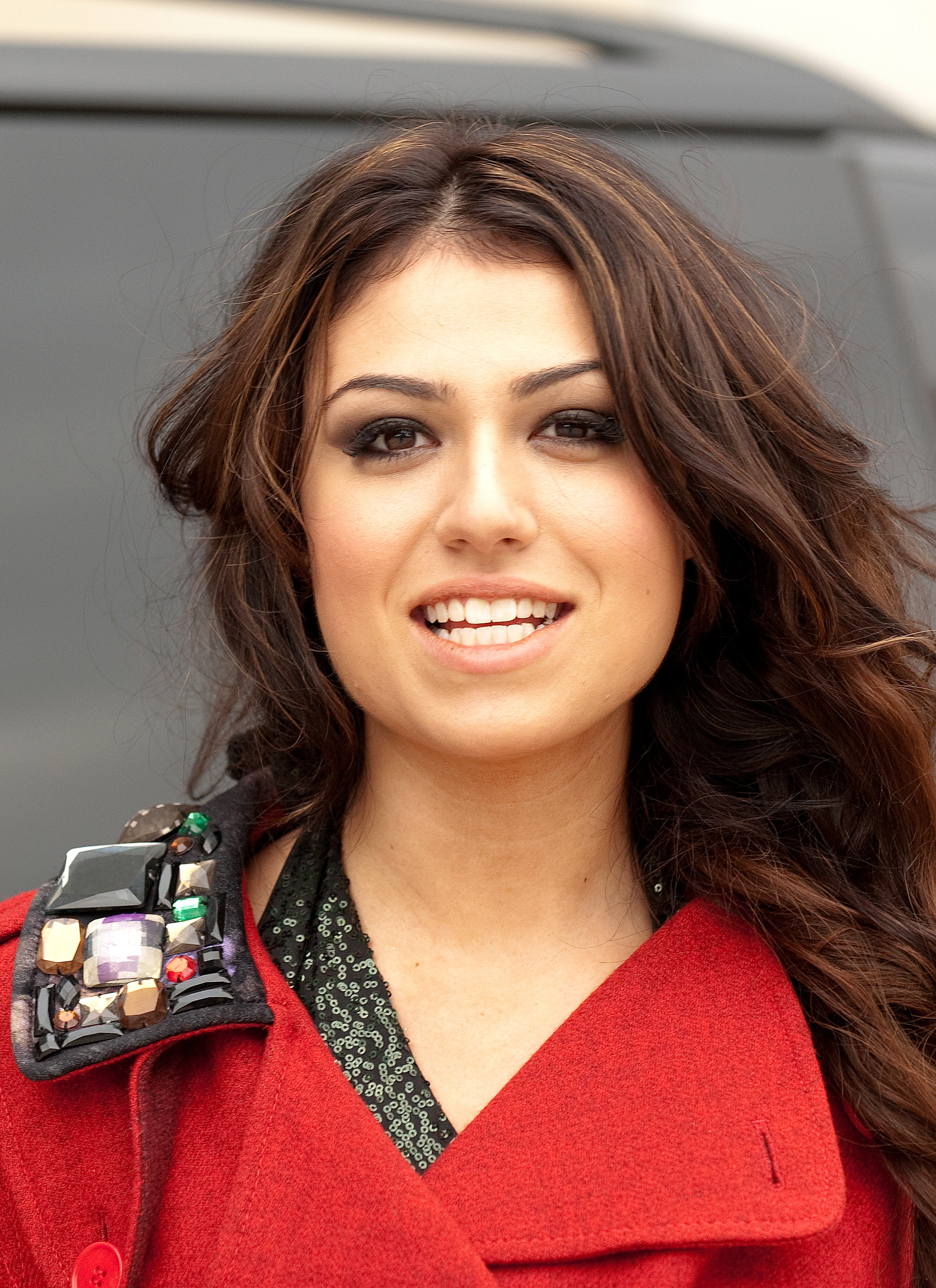
- Cilmi in 2010

Background information
- Born: Gabriella Lucia Cilmi; 10 October 1991 (age 35); Dandenong, Victoria, Australia
- Genre: Pop
- Occupations: Singer; songwriter
- Instrument: Vocals
- Years active: 2004–present
- Labels: Island; Mushroom; Universal Republic; V2
- Website: gabriellacilmimusic.com

Gabriella Lucia Cilmi (/ˈtʃɪlmi/ CHIL-mee; Italian: [ˈtʃilmi]; born 10 October 1991) is an Australian and Italian pop singer and songwriter. A contralto, Cilmi is known for her distinctive raspy singing voice.

Her debut album, Lessons to Be Learned, was released in March 2008, becoming a moderate international success. Cilmi won six ARIA Music Awards, including Single of the Year and Best Female Artist, in 2008. Her second studio album, Ten, was released in March 2010. Her third studio album, The Sting, was released in November 2013. In November 2019, Cilmi released a six-track EP, The Water, which she called a taste of a yet-to-be-released studio album. Cilmi holds dual Australian-Italian citizenship. In February 2025, Cilmi returned home to Australia to support the Corrs on the Australian leg of their tour.

== Early life ==
Gabriella Cilmi was born in the Melbourne suburb of Dandenong. She is of Italian–Albanian descent. Cilmi had an Italian upbringing where she participated in community events. She spoke her parents' Italian dialects at home, describing her mother's language as interspersed with Albanian words and learned standard Italian at school. Cilmi attended Sacred Heart Girls' College in Oakleigh. She moved to London with her family when she was fifteen, where she currently lives with her parents Paula and Joe (whose origins are in Calabria and Sicily, Italy) and her brother Joseph. At an early age, Cilmi developed an interest in a wide range of blues and rock music acts, including Nina Simone, Led Zeppelin, Janis Joplin, Sweet, T. Rex and Cat Stevens. She has also cited Suzi Quatro as a particular influence. Despite her natural aptitude and vocal talent, Cilmi was told that she lacked the discipline necessary to pursue a singing career. Idolising Janis Joplin, during this time she sang with a band (Foucault) covering songs by Led Zeppelin, Jet, Silverchair and others. Cilmi recorded original songs with writer/producers Barbara and Adrian Hannan of The SongStore.

In 2004, Cilmi captured the attention of Warner Music executive Michael Parisi while giving an impromptu rendition of the Rolling Stones' song "Jumpin' Jack Flash" at the Lygon Street Festa, a community festival in Melbourne. At the age of 13, Cilmi travelled to the US and UK with Adrian Hannan and was offered four major US deals. She eventually signed a contract with Island Records UK.

== Career ==
=== 2005–2009: Lessons to Be Learned ===
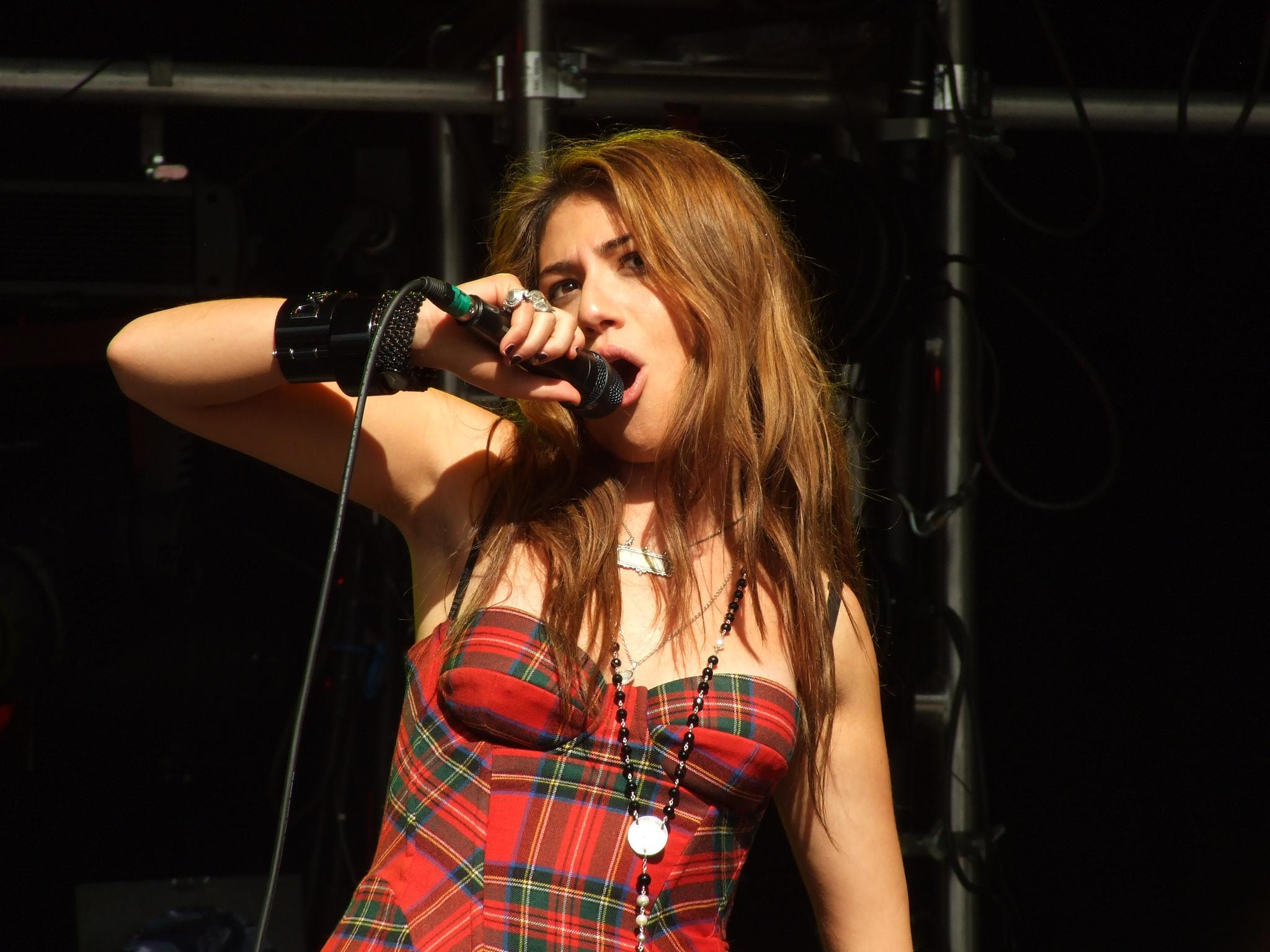
Cilmi performing at the 2008 Godiva Festival

The tracks "Don't Tell Me" and "Sorry", co-written with Barbara and Adrian Hannan, appeared on the soundtrack of 2005 Australian film Hating Alison Ashley. Cilmi shared a manager (Cassandra Gracey), writer/producers (Xenomania) and UK record label (Island) with the Sugababes, and supported former Sugababe Mutya Buena at the Jazz Cafe in London in 2007. She made her UK TV debut in December 2007 when she sang her single "Sweet About Me" on Later... with Jools Holland. The same month, Cilmi's song "Sanctuary" featured in the film St Trinian's and on its soundtrack. She recorded the theme to UK TV series Echo Beach, which aired in early 2008 on ITV1; it is a cover of "Echo Beach" by Martha and the Muffins. In February 2008, she supported the Parisian band Nouvelle Vague on their UK tour.

Cilmi's first album, Lessons to Be Learned, was written and recorded with hit production team Xenomania and was released in March 2008 in the UK. Cilmi has been compared to Amy Winehouse. The first single, "Sweet About Me", debuted on the UK Singles Chart that month and climbed to number six three months later, in June. It reached number seventeen on the Irish Singles Chart, and peaked at number one on the Australian ARIA Singles Chart. The song was used in a worldwide advertising campaign for the deodorant Sure/Rexona. Cilmi's second UK single, "Save the Lies", was not as successful as "Sweet About Me", peaking at number thirty-three in the UK. In Australia, the second single from the album was "Don't Wanna Go to Bed Now", which reached number twenty-eight. The subsequent single, "Sanctuary", was issued in November 2008 and failed to chart.

From March to May 2008, Cilmi supported the Sugababes on their UK Change Tour. She opened for James Blunt on his June 2008 Australian tour, and participated in the October 2008 MTV Greece concert alongside R.E.M. and Kaiser Chiefs. Also in 2008, Cilmi won six ARIA Music Awards in Australia, taking Best Female Artist, Breakthrough Artist – Single ("Sweet About Me"), Breakthrough Artist – Album (Lessons to Be Learned), Best Pop Release (Lessons to Be Learned), Highest Selling Single ("Sweet About Me"), and Single of the Year ("Sweet About Me"). Cilmi covered the Connie Francis song "Warm This Winter", originally a minor hit for Francis in 1962 as "I'm Gonna Be Warm This Winter", for Co-operative's Christmas 2008 advertising campaign; released as a single, it reached number twenty-two on the UK Singles Chart. In January 2009, Cilmi was nominated in the International Female category at the BRIT Awards and sang in the Rod Laver Arena before the 2009 Australian Open men's final.

Cilmi performed at the Melbourne Cricket Ground in March 2009 for Sound Relief, a multi-venue rock music concert in support of relief for the Victorian bushfire crisis. The event was held simultaneously with a concert at the Sydney Cricket Ground. All the proceeds from the Melbourne Concert will go to the Red Cross Victorian Bushfire relief. Cilmi made her US television debut in March 2009 and performed on the Pyramid (main) stage at the Glastonbury Festival in June 2009. The following August, she won Grand Prix at Sopot International Song Festival, an international song contest in Poland.

=== 2010: Ten ===
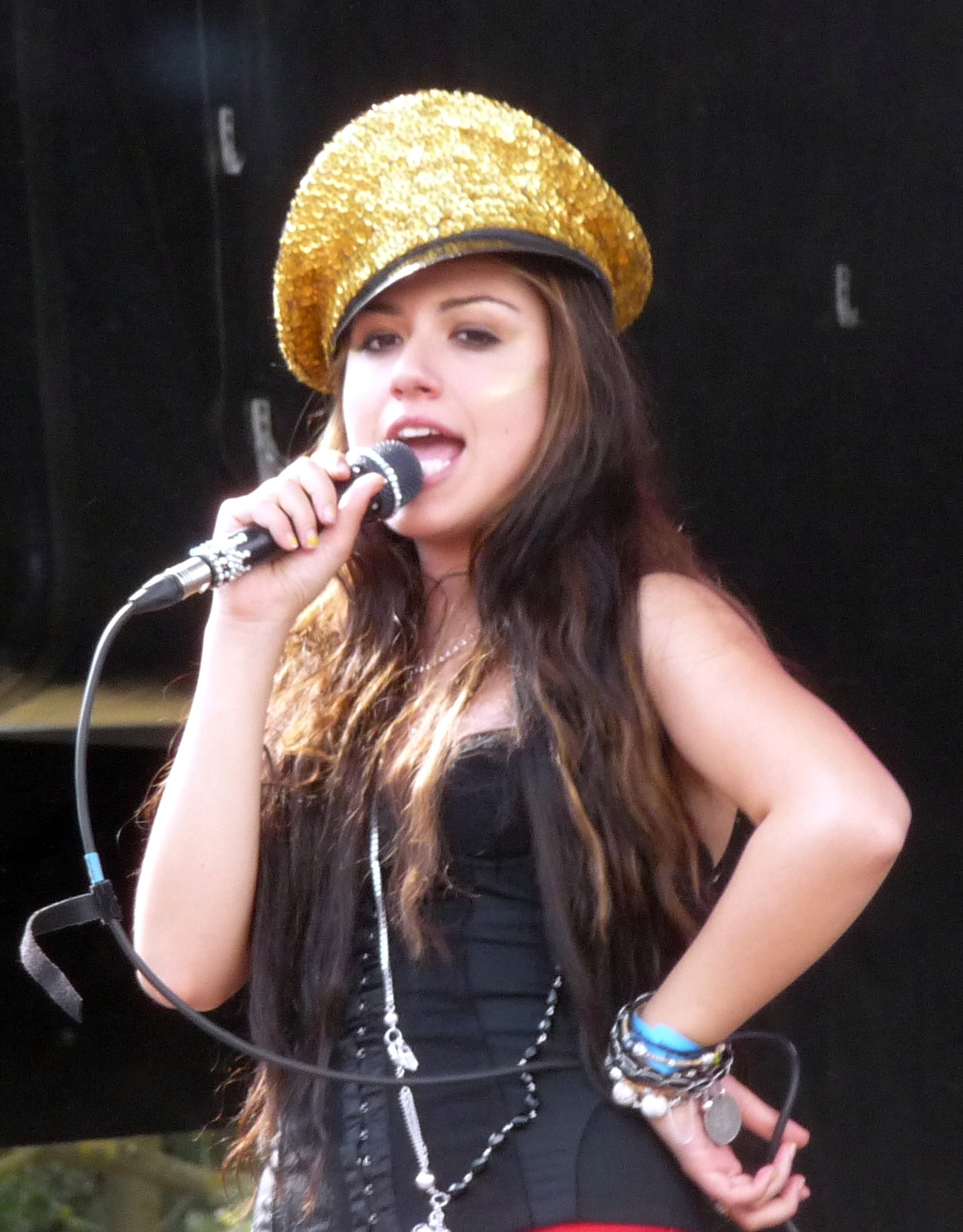
Cilmi performing at Furia Sound Festival in 2009

The lead single of Cilmi's Ten was "On a Mission". It was released on 5 February 2010 in Australia and on 7 March 2010 in Europe. As soon as the song was broadcast on Australian radios, it reached number-one most added track to Australian radio in its second week of release, getting played 296 times. The song reached number 9 on the UK Singles Chart and number sixteen in Australia.

The new album Ten was planned for 22 March 2010 and Cilmi said it would feature "lots of uptempo funk and disco-inspired numbers designed to make people groove", referring to "On a Mission", "Hearts Don't Lie" and "Love Me Coz", as well as "some more sexy tracks" probably referring to "Superhot" and "Invisible Girl". The song "Boys" incorporated a type of yodel into it. The song "Let Me Know" was described as the "Lessons to Be Learned-ish" song of the album. It also featured a new version of "Sweet About Me", with some disco/electronic style to show the change in her music.

While producing the album, Cilmi worked with Greg Kurstin, The Invisible Men and Dallas Austin, as well as Xenomania. She made her debut in producing with the track "Love Me Coz", saying that it was the song she was most proud of due to the fact it was produced with her band. It bore an electropop sound in contrast to her first album, which had more of a pop/rock style.

Ten was not as successful as Lessons to Be Learned, reaching number 17 in Australia and number 28 in the UK. In an interview, Cilmi explained that the sales were not her first concern; however, she expressed regret about posing topless for FHM magazine during the publicity for the album.

The second single, "Hearts Don't Lie", was released in June 2010 in the UK. The third single, "Defender", was released in August 2010 accompanied by a B-side track, "Magic Carpet Ride", but both singles failed to make impact on the charts. Cilmi's version of "Magic Carpet Ride" was featured over the closing credits of British film Soulboy. Cilmi supported English singer Leona Lewis on the UK leg of her 2010 The Labyrinth Tour.

Popjustice named Ten as their fourth-best album of 2010.

=== 2010–2025: The Sting, All Kings and Queens and The Water EP ===
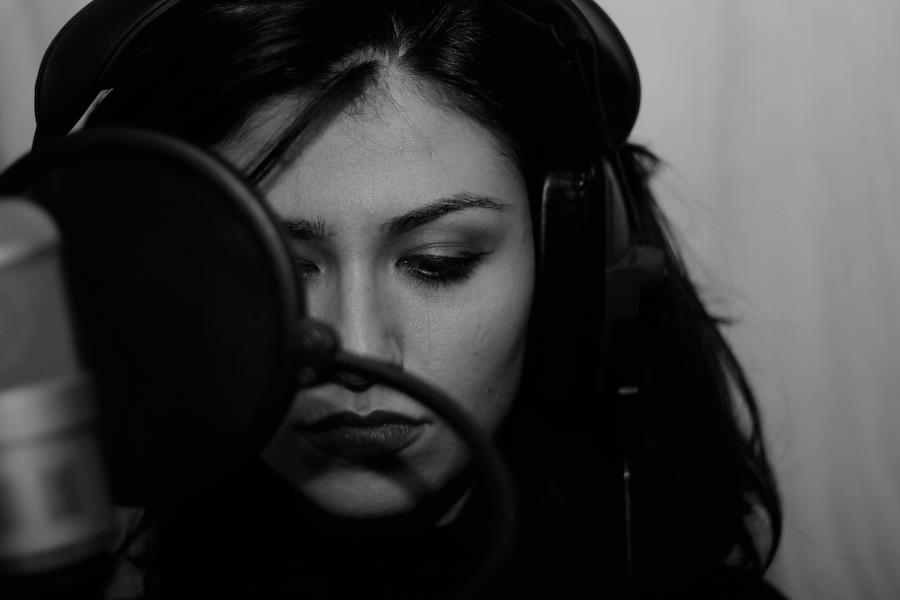
Cilmi recording in London, 2012

By October 2010, Cilmi had already begun work on her third studio album. She has been quoted as saying: "It's totally exciting because I am spending a bit more time with this record. I want to see what works. I really love Dolly Parton, roots music, Tricky and Enya, so anything could happen."

On 20 January 2012, Cilmi released an acoustic version of a song from her album, "Vicious Love". It is played in a clip video where she sings with her band and walks around an Italian restaurant with sunglasses. Two days after the broadcast, she says: "This is an 'Acoustic-ish' version of a tune that will be on the new record, one that I love very much". The song has blues influences, contrasting the disco-inspired pop sound of Ten. Cilmi claims she felt pressured into adopting a more sexual image, which prompted her to part ways with Island Records and her management team. She also told the Herald Sun that the lacklustre commercial reception of her second album, Ten, taught her not to compromise herself or her music: "It was an awakening for me to realise the position I am in to make the record that I want to make and just stand up for myself."

On 22 January 2012, Cilmi explained how the song "Vicious Love" was inspired. She states: "If you've ever experienced any type of 'Vicious Love' you will know that sometimes despite all the arrows pointing to a dead end there is just no way out, there is no way back. But then again don't all roads lead to dead ends? Guess we should just enjoy the ride..." In March 2013, Cilmi first performed "Sweet About Me", as well as two new songs "Come Wander With Me" and "Sweeter in History", at the Moxafrica Festival. On 15 March, the video from her new single "Sweeter in History", premiered on her YouTube page. The video was shot in Italy, precisely in Cassino and Valvori, Lazio. In July 2013, Cilmi announced a new track called "The Sting", released on 2 September as the album's lead single. The artwork of the single was revealed on 15 July 2013, picturing Cilmi in black and white, in front of a flower field. Cilmi's third studio album, The Sting, was released on 4 November 2013 on her own UK-based imprint Sweetness Tunes, in association with Absolute Marketing & Distribution. "Symmetry" was released on 11 November as the album's second single.

In April 2015, Cilmi announced that she would be performing with her brother Joseph under the name All Kings and Queens, and released the single "Voodoo" in September 2015. In 2018, single "Push" was released.

In June 2019, Cilmi posted a series of Instagram posts, explaining her desire to return to music and that she was in the process of completing new songs. On 1 July, Cilmi shared the first teaser for her new single titled "Ruins", which was released on 5 July 2019 with a music video released on 16 July 2019.

Cilmi announced she would be playing her first solo gig since 2014 at St Pancras New Church in London. Cilmi kicked off the promotion of her first new single in six years by appearing on ITV News, London Live and BBC Radio London. The track made its debut on BBC Radio 2.

Cilmi took part in live sessions on BBC Radio 2 and BBC Radio 5 Live. She appeared on the James Whale show on Talkradio on 12 August 2019. Cilmi released her EP, The Water on 1 November 2019. In an interview for the EP, Cilmi stated, "For this EP, I wanted to take things back to basics....When I went back and listened to my favourite records I realised there's no fancy production and the songs weren't written sitting in front of a computer playing a loop back and forward....these were songs that were written prior to being recorded in the studio....We recorded the songs onto my mobile phone into a folder called 'Skeletons' until it was time to go into the studio."

In 2020 she started Chillin' With Cilmi during the pandemic and she has plans to tour again and celebrated her streaming numbers at the end of 2022, in Europe, UK and Australia.

In February 2025, Cilmi toured alongside Delta Goodrem and the Corrs on the Australian leg of their tour.

=== 2026-Present: Pure Love ===
In February 2026, Cilmi performed as the opening act for Jack Savoretti and Katherine Jenkins, in honor of the War Child charity benefit concert.

On 24 April 2026, Cilmi released her first music in almost 7 years - "Pure Love" - which was the lead single from her fourth studio album Pure Love, which was released on V2 Records on 9 October 2026. Cilmi described the song as "coming home to yourself". The second single from the album, "YRU Hanging Around", was released on the same day. followed by the third single, "Pieces" - which was released on 4 September 2026.

Cilmi was the support act for Beverley Knight on her Born To Perform Tour in June 2026. Cilmi played a run of gigs across Australia throughout October 2026, and the United Kingdom in November 2026.

== Artistry ==
Cilmi has a contralto vocal range and has been compared to Anastacia and Amy Winehouse for her vocal stylings during the initial stages of her career. Cilmi also discovered her sound was partly caused by a back problem, known as hollow back or lordosis, which affects the way in which she uses her diaphragm muscles when singing, producing a more throaty sound. In a review for Ten, Caroline Sullivan of The Guardian complimented her voice stating it as 'precociously blistering' and 'Her zest and powerful voice can't be faulted'. Take 40 commented further 'a voice that sounds like it fell from the heavens' further noting her abilities as a 'vocal powerhouse' and being a 'brilliant and unique vocal talent'. She describes her music as "Quite vulnerable and compromised". Her debut Lessons to Be Learned is seen as having pop rock, jazz, blues and soul influences. Her voice is also seen as having a blend of Anastacia and Macy Gray elements. She experimented with "Eurovision disco and '50s jazz and 1950s sound" also on Lessons to Be Learned. Ten, her second album is her tribute to disco and EDM pop, highlighted by Invisible Girl discussing being someones "dirty little secret". She also had experimented with campy electro pop and a Moroder-ish "Love Me Cos You Want To". During her early twenties, she began to record her third album The Sting as her voice became raspier and developed a lower range, which allowed her to display her own signature sound. She discusses relationships that were doomed to fail on her the Sting album, which deals with her upset with career and relationship failures. The Water is described as "high-energy tracks that all exude a heady mix of soul drenched folk and swing whilst offering crossover hints of pop and country" and a range from country to soul music. On her fourth album, 'Pure Love', Cilmi took inspiration from artists such as Roberta Flack, Janis Joplin and Carole King. Cilmi co-wrote the third single from 'Pure Love', "Pieces", with Australian songwriter Julia Church and stated that she "purposefully sought out female collaborators" to bring the female gaze of the track to the forefront. "I wrote this one with Julia Church who is one of the most brilliant artists and songwriters I’ve ever worked with. I was listening to Roberta Flack’s record ‘First Take’ at the time and that really inspired the mood of the song."

== Popular culture ==
In 2008, "Sweet About Me" was released in Simlish (Sim speak) as part of The Sims 2 expansion pack Apartment Life's soundtrack. Cilmi is mentioned in Ed Sheeran's song "You Need Me, I Don't Need You". Her song "Sorry" is featured in the 2005 movie Hating Alison Ashley.

== Discography ==
- Lessons to Be Learned (2008)
- Ten (2010)
- The Sting (2013)
- Pure Love (2026)

== Tours ==
Headline

- 2008: Lessons to Be Learnt Tour
- 2014: The Sting Tour
- 2019–2020: The Water Tour

As supporting act

- 2008 – Sugababes – Change Tour (selected dates)
- 2010 – Leona Lewis – The Labyrinth (UK dates only)
- 2025 – The Corrs Tour (Australian dates only)
- 2026– Beverley Knight – Born To Perform Tour

== Awards and nominations ==
Awards and nominations for Gabriella Cilmi
Year	Recipient	Award	Category	Result
2008	Gabriella Cilmi	ARIA Music Awards	Best Female Artist	Won
2008	Lessons to Be Learned	ARIA Music Awards	Best Pop Release	Won
2008	Lessons to Be Learned	ARIA Music Awards	Breakthrough Artist – Album	Won
2008	"Sweet About Me"	ARIA Music Awards	Breakthrough Artist – Single	Won
2008	"Sweet About Me"	ARIA Music Awards	Highest Selling Single	Won
2008	"Sweet About Me"	ARIA Music Awards	Single of the Year	Won
2008	Gabriella Cilmi	Q Awards	Breakthrough Artist	Nominated
2008	Gabriella Cilmi	MTV Europe Music Awards	Best New Act	Shortlisted
2008	Gabriella Cilmi	Žebřík Music Awards	Best International Discovery	Nominated
2009	Gabriella Cilmi	BRIT Awards	International Female Solo Artist	Nominated
2009	Gabriella Cilmi	Echo Awards	Best International Newcomer	Nominated
2009	Gabriella Cilmi	Sopot International Song Festival	Best Performer	Won
2010	"On a Mission"	ARIA Music Awards	Most Popular Australian Single	Shortlisted
