= Connie Francis discography =

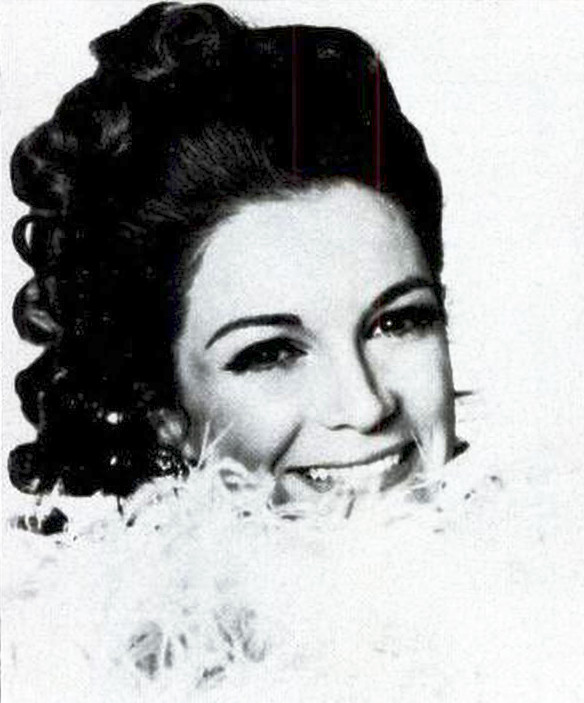
- Connie Francis c. 1970
- Studio albums: 47
- Soundtrack albums: 3
- Live albums: 5
- Compilation albums: 15
- International albums: 19
- US EPs: 28
- UK EPs: 19
- Singles: 84
- Foreign-language singles: 107

This is the discography of American pop singer Connie Francis. Throughout her career, she sold 200 million records worldwide. In 1959, she was recognized as the then best-selling female recording artist in Germany and was once hailed as the world's best-selling female vocalist in history at that time. She was the first woman to reach number one on the Billboard Hot 100. Billboard ranked her as the 8th Top Artist of the Decade for the 1960s.

== Albums ==
=== Studio albums ===
Title	Album details	Peak chart positions			
Title	Album details	US	US CB	US Christ.	UK
Who's Sorry Now	Released: April 1958; Label: MGM; Formats: LP	—	—	—	—
The Exciting Connie Francis	Released: March 1959; Label: MGM; Formats: LP, reel-to-reel	—	—	—	—
My Thanks to You	Released: August 1959; Label: MGM; Formats: LP, reel-to-reel	—	—	—	—
Connie Francis Sings Italian Favorites	Released: November 1959; Label: MGM; Formats: LP, reel-to-reel	4	5	—	—
Christmas in My Heart	Released: November 1959; Label: MGM; Formats: LP, reel-to-reel	—	—	19	—
Rock 'n' Roll Million Sellers	Released: November 1959; Label: MGM; Formats: LP, reel-to-reel	—	47	—	12
Country & Western – Golden Hits	Released: November 1959; Label: MGM; Formats: LP, reel-to-reel	—	—	—	—
Connie Francis Sings Fun Songs for Children	Released: November 1959; Label: Lion; Formats: LP	—	—	—	—
Connie Francis Sings Spanish and Latin American Favorites	Released: September 1960; Label: MGM; Formats: LP, reel-to-reel	—	23	—	—
Connie Francis Sings Jewish Favorites	Released: October 1960; Label: MGM; Formats: LP, reel-to-reel	69	33	—	—
More Italian Favorites	Released: October 1960; Label: MGM; Formats: LP, reel-to-reel	9	39	—	—
Songs to a Swinging Band	Released: January 1961; Label: MGM; Formats: LP, reel-to-reel	—	—	—	—
Sing Along with Connie Francis	Released: September 1961; Label: Mati-Mor; Formats: LP; Licensed to Mati-Mor as part of a promotion with Brylcreem	—	—	—	—
Connie Francis Sings "Never on Sunday"	Released: October 1961; Label: MGM; Formats: LP, reel-to-reel	11	10	—	—
Connie Francis Sings Folk Song Favorites	Released: November 1961; Label: MGM; Formats: LP, reel-to-reel	—	—	—	—
Do the Twist	Released: February 1962; Label: MGM; Formats: LP, reel-to-reel; Repackaged and rereleased in the same year as Dance Party	47	48	—	—
Connie Francis Sings Irish Favorites	Released: March 1962; Label: MGM; Formats: LP, reel-to-reel	—	—	—	—
Connie Francis Sings "Second Hand Love"	Released: May 1962; Label: MGM; Formats: LP, reel-to-reel	111	—	—	—
Country Music Connie Style	Released: September 1962; Label: MGM; Formats: LP, reel-to-reel	22	23	—	—
Connie Francis Sings Modern Italian Hits	Released: December 1962; Label: MGM; Formats: LP, reel-to-reel	103	43	—	—
Connie Francis Sings Award Winning Motion Picture Hits	Released: April 1963; Label: MGM; Formats: LP, reel-to-reel	108	20	—	—
Greatest American Waltzes	Released: August 1963; Label: MGM; Formats: LP, reel-to-reel	94	39	—	—
"Mala Femmena" and Connie's Big Hits from Italy	Released: September 1963; Label: MGM; Formats: LP, reel-to-reel	70	44	—	—
In the Summer of His Years	Released: December 1963; Label: MGM; Formats: LP, reel-to-reel	126	47	—	—
Connie Francis Sings German Favorites	Released: January 1964; Label: MGM; Formats: LP, reel-to-reel	—	—	—	—
A New Kind of Connie...	Released: September 1964; Label: MGM; Formats: LP, reel-to-reel	149	73	—	—
Connie Francis & Hank Williams, Jr. Sing Great Country Favorites	Released: November 1964; Label: MGM; Formats: LP, reel-to-reel; Duet album with Hank Williams, Jr.	—	—	—	—
Connie Francis Sings "For Mama"	Released: March 1965; Label: MGM; Formats: LP, reel-to-reel	78	89	—	—
Connie Francis Sings All-Time International Hits	Released: July 1965; Label: MGM; Formats: LP, reel-to-reel	—	—	—	—
Jealous Heart	Released: January 1966; Label: MGM; Formats: LP, reel-to-reel	—	—	—	—
Movie Greats of the 60's	Released: July 1966; Label: MGM; Formats: LP, reel-to-reel	—	—	—	—
Love Italian Style	Released: January 1967; Label: MGM; Formats: LP, reel-to-reel	—	—	—	—
Happiness – Connie Francis on Broadway Today	Released: May 1967; Label: MGM; Formats: LP, reel-to-reel	—	—	—	—
Grandes Éxitos del Cine de los Años 60	Released: July 1967; Label: MGM; Formats: LP, reel-to-reel	—	—	—	—
My Heart Cries for You	Released: July 1967; Label: MGM; Formats: LP, reel-to-reel	—	—	—	—
Connie & Clyde – Hit Songs of the 30s	Released: May 1968; Label: MGM; Formats: LP, reel-to-reel	—	—	—	—
Hawaii Connie	Released: June 1968; Label: MGM; Formats: LP, reel-to-reel	—	—	—	—
Connie Francis and the Kids Next Door	Released: October 1968; Label: Leo the Lion; Formats: LP	—	—	—	—
Connie Francis Sings Bacharach & David	Released: November 1968; Label: MGM; Formats: LP, reel-to-reel	—	—	—	—
The Wedding Cake	Released: May 1969; Label: MGM; Formats: LP	—	—	—	—
Connie Francis Sings the Songs of Les Reed	Released: November 1969; Label: MGM; Formats: LP	—	—	—	—
Who's Happy Now?	Released: September 15, 1978; Label: United Artists; Formats: LP, MC	—	—	—	—
I'm Me Again – Silver Anniversary Album	Released: May 1981; Label: MGM, Polydor; Formats: LP, MC	—	—	—	—
Where the Hits Are	Released: September 1989; Label: Malaco; Formats: CD, 2xLP, MC; Consists of re-recordings	—	—	—	—
Among My Souvenirs	Released: September 1990; Label: Malaco; Formats: CD, LP, MC; Consists of re-recordings	—	—	—	—
With Love to Buddy	Released: 1996; Label: Carlton Sounds; Formats: CD	—	—	—	—
One for the Boys	Released: April 14, 2023; Label: Universal Music; Formats: digital download; Recorded in 1959 and original scheduled for release in early 1960 before being withdrawn	—	—	—	—
"—" denotes releases that did not chart or were not released in that territory.

=== Soundtrack albums ===
Title	Album details	Peak chart positions	
Title	Album details	US	US CB
Follow the Boys	Released: February 1963; Label: MGM; Formats: LP, reel-to-reel; Side 2 consists of songs not from the film	66	29
Looking for Love	Released: June 1964; Label: MGM; Formats: LP, reel-to-reel	122	43
When the Boys Meet the Girls	Released: December 1965; Label: MGM; Formats: LP, reel-to-reel; Francis sings on five tracks	61	81
"—" denotes releases that did not chart or were not released in that territory.

=== Live albums ===
Title	Album details	Peak chart positions
Title	Album details	US
Connie Francis at the Copa	Released: January 1961; Label: MGM; Formats: LP	65
Live at The Sahara in Las Vegas	Released: October 1966; Label: MGM; Formats: LP, reel-to-reel	—
The Return Concert Live at Trump's Castle	Released: October 29, 1996; Label: Click; Formats: CD	—
The European Concert	Released: 2003; Label: Concetta; Formats: CD	—
The American Tour – Greatest Live Performances	Released: January 2005; Label: Concetta; Formats: CD	—
"—" denotes releases that did not chart or were not released in that territory.

=== Compilation albums ===
Title	Album details	Peak chart positions			
Title	Album details	US	US CB	CAN	UK
Connie's Greatest Hits	Released: November 1959; Label: MGM; Formats: LP, reel-to-reel	17	19	1	16
More Greatest Hits	Released: May 1961; Label: MGM; Formats: LP, reel-to-reel	39	16	—	—
The Very Best of Connie Francis – Connie's 15 Biggest Hits	Released: October 1963; Label: MGM; Formats: LP, reel-to-reel	68	73	—	—
20 All-Time Greats	Released: May 1977; Label: Polydor; Formats: LP, MC, 8-track	—	—	—	1
The Very Best of Connie Francis – Connie's 21 Biggest Hits!	Released: 1986; Label: Polydor; Formats: CD, LP	—	—	—	—
Rocksides (1957–64)	Released: 1987; Label: Polydor; Formats: CD, 2xLP, MC	—	—	—	—
The Singles Collection	Released: April 1993; Label: Polygram TV; Formats: CD, LP, MC	—	—	—	12
Souvenirs	Released: November 1996; Label: Polydor; Formats: 4xCD box set	—	—	—	—
Fallin' – Best of the Early Years	Released: November 9, 2009; Label: Jasmine; Formats: 2xCD	—	—	—	—
Everybody's Somebody's Fool – The Very Best of Connie Francis 1959–1961	Released: October 2, 2012; Label: Jasmine; Formats: 2xCD	—	—	—	—
The Complete US & UK Singles As & Bs 1955–62	Released: March 10, 2014; Label: Acrobat; Formats: 3xCD	—	—	—	—
19 Original Albums & Bonus Tracks	Released: September 18, 2015; Label: Documents; Formats: 10xCD box set	—	—	—	—
All Time Greats	Released: November 15, 2019; Label: Universal Music/His Master's Voice; Formats: 2xCD, digital download	—	—	—	—
Stupid Cupid – Hits Collection 1957–1962	Released: April 7, 2023; Label: Acrobat; Formats: LP	—	—	—	—
The Continental EP Collection	Released: July 12, 2024; Label: Jasmine; Formats: CD	—	—	—	—
"—" denotes releases that did not chart or were not released in that territory.

=== International albums ===
Listed below are albums released outside of the US and UK that were also not repackagings of the original US album.

Title	Album details	Peak chart positions	
Title	Album details	AUT	GER
Connie Francis	Released: October 1959; Label: MGM; Formats: LP; Japan release, songs are in English	—	—
Sing Along with Connie Francis	Released: March 1960; Label: MGM; Formats: LP; Japan release, songs are in English	—	—
The Exciting Connie Francis	Released: July 1960; Label: MGM; Formats: LP; Japan release, songs are in English	—	—
Jamais	Released: 1961; Label: MGM; Formats: LP; Canada release, songs are in French	—	—
Connie nel Mundo	Released: October 1961; Label: MGM; Formats: LP; Italy release, songs are in various languages	—	—
A Date with Connie Francis	Released: June 1962; Label: MGM; Formats: LP; Japan release, songs are in English	—	—
Around the World with Connie	Released: August 1962; Label: MGM; Formats: LP; Japan release, songs are in English	—	—
Minna no Connie	Released: November 1962; Label: MGM; Formats: LP; Japan release, songs are in Japanese	—	—
Connie in Italia	Released: December 1962; Label: MGM; Formats: LP; Italy release, songs are in Italian	—	—
Vacation with Connie	Released: February 10, 1963; Label: MGM; Formats: LP; Japan release, songs are in Japanese and English	—	—
En suivant mon cœur	Released: 1963; Label: MGM; Formats: LP; Canada release, songs are in French	—	—
Décidement	Released: 1963; Label: MGM; Formats: LP; Canada release, majority of songs are in French, but also English and Spanish	—	—
Connie Francis en El Patio	Released: 1964; Label: MGM; Formats: LP; Latin America release, songs are in Spanish	—	—
Melodien die die Welt erobern	Released: October 1966; Label: MGM; Formats: LP; Germany release, songs are in German	—	—
Lass mich bei dir sein	Released: February 1968; Label: MGM; Formats: LP; Germany release, songs are in German	—	—
Was ich bin	Released: September 1978; Label: United Artists; Formats: LP; Germany release, songs are in German	—	—
Canta en español	Released: September 1978; Label: United Artists; Formats: LP, MC; Spanish release, songs are in Spanish	—	—
Connie Francis	Released: November 1985; Label: Polydor; Formats: LP; Brazil release, majority of songs are in Portuguese, but also English and Italian	—	—
Jive Connie – Connie Francis Party Power	Released: April 1992; Label: Polydor; Formats: CD, MC; German release, songs are in German	9	27
"—" denotes releases that did not chart or were not released in that territory.

== EPs ==
=== US EPs ===
Title	EP details
Who's Sorry Now	Released: 1958; Label: MGM; Formats: 7"
Who's Sorry Now Vol. 1	Released: May 1958; Label: MGM; Formats: 7"
Who's Sorry Now Vol. 2	Released: May 1958; Label: MGM; Formats: 7"
Who's Sorry Now Vol. 3	Released: May 1958; Label: MGM; Formats: 7"
My Happiness	Released: March 1959; Label: MGM; Formats: 7"
The Exciting Connie Francis Vol. 1	Released: May 1959; Label: MGM; Formats: 7"
The Exciting Connie Francis Vol. 2	Released: May 1959; Label: MGM; Formats: 7"
The Exciting Connie Francis Vol. 3	Released: May 1959; Label: MGM; Formats: 7"
My Thanks to You Vol. 1	Released: August 1959; Label: MGM; Formats: 7"
My Thanks to You Vol. 2	Released: August 1959; Label: MGM; Formats: 7"
My Thanks to You Vol. 3	Released: August 1959; Label: MGM; Formats: 7"
Connie Francis	Released: October 1959; Label: MGM; Formats: 7"
Connie's Greatest Hits Vol. 1	Released: November 1959; Label: MGM; Formats: 7"
Connie's Greatest Hits Vol. 2	Released: November 1959; Label: MGM; Formats: 7"
Connie's Greatest Hits Vol. 3	Released: November 1959; Label: MGM; Formats: 7"
Rock 'n' Roll Million Sellers Vol. 1	Released: November 1959; Label: MGM; Formats: 7"
Rock 'n' Roll Million Sellers Vol. 2	Released: November 1959; Label: MGM; Formats: 7"
Rock 'n' Roll Million Sellers Vol. 3	Released: November 1959; Label: MGM; Formats: 7"
Country & Western Golden Hits Vol. 1	Released: November 1959; Label: MGM; Formats: 7"
Country & Western Golden Hits Vol. 2	Released: November 1959; Label: MGM; Formats: 7"
Country & Western Golden Hits Vol. 3	Released: November 1959; Label: MGM; Formats: 7"
Valentino	Released: 1960; Label: MGM; Formats: 7"
My Thanks to You Connie Francis	Released: March 1962; Label: MGM; Formats: Mini LP
Connie Francis	Released: July 1962; Label: MGM; Formats: 7"
Greatest American Waltzes	Released: July 1963; Label: MGM; Formats: Mini LP
Country Music Connie Style	Released: 1965; Label: MGM; Formats: Mini LP
Jealous Heart	Released: January 1966; Label: MGM; Formats: Mini LP
Connie Francis Movie Greats of the 60's	Released: July 1966; Label: MGM; Formats: Mini LP

=== UK EPs ===
Title	EP details	Peak chart positions
Title	EP details	UK
A Girl in Love	Released: May 1958; Label: MGM; Formats: 7"	—
Heartaches	Released: October 1958; Label: MGM; Formats: 7"	14
Connie Francis	Released: March 1959; Label: MGM; Formats: 7"	—
If I Didn't Care	Released: July 1959; Label: MGM; Formats: 7"	—
You're My Everything	Released: December 1959; Label: MGM; Formats: 7"	—
Rock 'n' Roll Million Sellers	Released: April 1960; Label: MGM; Formats: 7"	—
Rock 'n' Roll Million Sellers No. 2	Released: April 1960; Label: MGM; Formats: 7"	—
Rock 'n' Roll Million Sellers No. 3	Released: May 1960; Label: MGM; Formats: 7"	—
First Lady of Record	Released: December 1960; Label: MGM; Formats: 7"	7
Where the Boys Are	Released: August 1961; Label: MGM; Formats: 7"	—
Connie Francis Favourites	Released: December 1961; Label: MGM; Formats: 7"	—
Connie Francis Sings Italian Favourites	Released: August 1962; Label: MGM; Formats: 7"	—
Connie's American Hits	Released: December 1962; Label: MGM; Formats: 7"	—
Hey Ring-a-Ding	Released: March 1, 1963; Label: MGM; Formats: 7"	—
Mala Femmena	Released: September 1963; Label: MGM; Formats: 7"	—
What Kind of Fool Am I	Released: November 1, 1963; Label: MGM; Formats: 7"	—
From Italy... With Love	Released: August 1964; Label: MGM; Formats: 7"	—
Connie Francis Sings for Mama	Released: April 1965; Label: MGM; Formats: 7"	—
Connie Francis	Released: October 1966; Label: MGM; Formats: 7"	—
"—" denotes releases that did not chart.

== Singles ==
=== 1950s ===
Title (A-side/B-side) (Note: The B-sides listed are for the US releases of the singles except where not applicable. Various other songs were released as B-sides to the main A-sides in other countries.)	Year	Peak chart positions							
Title (A-side/B-side)	Year	US	US CB	US RW	US R&B	AUS	CAN	NOR	UK
"Freddy" "Didn't I Love You Enough"	1955	— —	— —	53 —	— —	— —	— —	— —	— —
"(Oh Please) Make Him Jealous" "Goody Goodbye"	1955	— —	— —	— —	— —	— —	— —	— —	— —
"My Treasure" "Are You Satisfied?"	1955	— —	37 —	38 —	— —	— —	— —	— —	— —
"My First Real Love" "Believe in Me (Credimi)"	1956	— —	— —	— —	— —	— —	— —	— —	— —
"Forgetting" "Send for My Baby"	1956	— —	— —	— —	— —	— —	— —	— —	— —
"Everyone Needs Someone" "My Sailor Boy"	1956	— —	— —	— —	— —	— —	— —	— —	— —
"I Never Had a Sweetheart" "Little Blue Wren"	1956	— —	— —	— —	— —	— —	— —	— —	— —
"No Other One" "I Leaned on a Man"	1957	— —	— —	— —	— —	— —	— —	— —	— —
"Eighteen" "Faded Orchid"	1957	— —	— —	54 —	— —	— —	27 —	— —	— —
"The Majesty of Love" (with Marvin Rainwater) "You, My Darlin' You" (with Marvin Rainwater)	1957	93 —	— —	76 —	— —	37 —	— —	— —	— —
"Who's Sorry Now" "You Were Only Fooling (While I Was Falling in Love)"	1957	4 —	3 —	2 —	4 —	19 —	1 —	— —	1 —
"I'm Sorry I Made You Cry" "Lock Up Your Heart"	1958	36 —	31 —	10 —	— —	70 —	27 —	— —	11 —
"Heartaches" "I Miss You So"	1958	— —	— —	— —	— —	— —	— —	— —	— —
"Stupid Cupid" "Carolina Moon"	1958	14 —	16 —	18; 32	— —	23 —	12 —	— 1	1
"Fallin'" "Happy Days and Lonely Nights"	1958	30 —	39; 88	34; 70	— —	— —	— —	— —	— —
"I'll Get By" (Note: Single not released in the US.) "Fallin'"	1958	— —	— —	— —	— —	— —	— —	— —	19; 20
"My Happiness" "Never Before"	1958	2 —	2; 99	2 —	11 —	43 —	4 —	2 —	4 —
"You Always Hurt the One You Love" "In the Valley of Love"	1958	— —	— —	— —	— —	— 95	— —	— —	13 —
"If I Didn't Care" "Toward the End of the Day"	1959	22 —	15 —	9 —	29 —	85 —	16 —	— —	— —
"Lipstick on Your Collar" "Frankie"	1959	5; 9	3; 9	5; 5	10; 17	4; 72	2	7 —	3 —
"You're Gonna Miss Me" "Plenty Good Lovin'"	1959	34; 69	32; 63	22; 39	— —	73; 77	28	— —	— 18
"Among My Souvenirs" "God Bless America"	1959	7; 36	5; 36	7; 29	10 —	4 —	2 —	— —	11 —
"—" denotes releases that did not chart or were not released in that territory.

=== 1960s ===
Title (A-side/B-side)	Year	Peak chart positions								
Title (A-side/B-side)	Year	US	US CB	US RW	US AC	US Cou.	US R&B	AUS	CAN	UK
"Mama" "Teddy"	1960	8; 17	7; 31	7; 30	— —	— —	— —	6 —	3	2 (Note: "Mama" charted in the UK as a double A-side with "Robot Man".) —
"Valentino" "It Would Be Worth It"	1960	— —	— —	— —	— —	— —	— —	— —	— —	27 —
"Jealous of You (Tango della Gelosia)" "Everybody's Somebody's Fool"	1960	19; 1	27; 1	25; 1	— —	— 24	— 2	— 1	1	— 5
"Robot Man" "Come Rain or Come Shine"	1960	— —	— —	— —	— —	— —	— —	6 —	— —	2 —
"My Heart Has a Mind of Its Own" "Malagueña"	1960	1; 42	1; 67	1; 55	— —	— —	11 —	3	3	3 —
"Many Tears Ago" "Senza Mamma (With No One)"	1960	7; 87	9 —	6; 95	— —	— —	— —	18 —	6 —	12 —
"Where the Boys Are" "No One"	1961	4; 34	4; 63	2; 52	— —	— —	— —	5 —	7	5 —
"Breakin' in a Brand New Broken Heart" "Someone Else's Boy"	1961	7 —	5; 109	3; 93	— —	— —	— —	8 —	14 —	12 —
"Together" "Too Many Rules"	1961	6; 72	7; 64	4; 70	1 —	— —	— —	2 —	13	6 —
"Hollywood" "(He's My) Dreamboat"	1961	42; 14	26; 22	20; 15	— —	— —	— —	27	14	— —
"When the Boy in Your Arms (Is the Boy in Your Heart)" "Baby's First Christmas"	1961	10; 26	8; 52	7; 22	2; 7	— —	— —	40 —	10	— 30
"Don't Break the Heart That Loves You" "Drop It Joe"	1962	1 —	2 —	2 —	1 —	— —	— —	18	18	39 —
"Don't Cry on My Shoulder" "Mr. Twister"	1962	— —	— —	— —	— —	— —	— —	— —	— —	— —
"Second Hand Love" "Gonna Git That Man"	1962	7 —	7; 117	6 —	3 —	— —	— —	54 —	20 —	— —
"Vacation" "The Biggest Sin of All"	1962	9; 116	10; 89	9; 95	— —	— —	— —	77 —	15 —	10 —
"Never on Sunday" "Tammy"	1962	— —	— —	— —	— —	— —	— —	66 —	— —	— —
"I Was Such a Fool (to Fall in Love with You)" "He Thinks I Still Care"	1962	24; 57	18; 51	19; 51	8; 18	— —	— —	— —	32; 26	— —
"Playin' Games" "I Was Such a Fool (to Fall in Love with You)"	1962	— —	— —	— —	— —	— —	— —	— —	— —	— —
"I'm Gonna Be Warm This Winter" "Al di là"	1962	18; 90	18; 87	17; 59	19 —	— —	— —	9 —	21; 25	48 —
"Follow the Boys" "Waiting for Billy"	1963	17; 127	11 —	15 —	7 —	— —	— —	35 —	41 —	— —
"If My Pillow Could Talk" "You're the Only One Can Hurt Me"	1963	23 —	16; 116	14; 129	— —	— —	— —	30 —	21 —	— —
"Drownin' My Sorrows" "Mala Femmena"	1963	36; 114	34; 101	26; 85	— —	— —	— —	27 —	40 —	— —
"Your Other Love" "Whatever Happened to Rosemarie"	1963	28 —	22; 132	20 —	10 —	— —	— —	54	32 —	— —
"In the Summer of His Years" "My Buddy"	1963	46 —	31 —	30 —	— —	— —	— —	49 —	21 —	— —
"Blue Winter" "You Know You Don't Want Me (So Why Don't You Leave Me Alone)"	1964	24 —	16 —	13 —	7 —	— —	— —	25 —	23 —	— —
"Be Anything (But Be Mine)" "Tommy"	1964	25 —	23; 136	20 —	9 —	— —	— —	48 —	42 —	— —
"Looking for Love" "This Is My Happiest Moment"	1964	45 —	34 —	34 —	— —	— —	— —	42 —	33 —	— —
"Don't Ever Leave Me" "We Have Something More (than a Summer Love)"	1964	42; 128	37 —	46; 81	— —	— —	— —	— —	— —	— —
"Whose Heart Are You Breaking Tonight?" "Come On Jerry"	1965	43 —	42 —	45 —	7 —	— —	— —	56 —	— —	— —
"For Mama (La Mamma)" "She'll Be Comin' 'Round the Mountain"	1965	48 —	35 —	30 —	11 —	— —	— —	— —	— —	— —
"Wishing It Was You" "You're Mine (Just When You're Lonely)"	1965	57 —	49 —	51 —	14 —	— —	— —	— —	— —	— —
"My Child" "No One Ever Sends Me Roses"	1965	— —	— —	— —	— —	— —	— —	— —	— —	26 —
"Forget Domani" "No One Ever Sends Me Roses"	1965	79 —	58 —	86 —	16 —	— —	— —	— —	— —	— —
"Roundabout" "Bossa Nova Hand Dance (Deixa isso prà lá)"	1965	80 —	83 —	92 —	10 —	— —	— —	— —	— —	— —
"Jealous Heart" "Can I Rely on You"	1965	47 —	29 —	25 —	10 —	— —	— —	54 —	16 —	44 —
"Love Is Me, Love Is You" "I'd Let You Break My Heart All Over Again"	1966	66 —	68 —	68 —	28 —	— —	— —	31 —	62 —	— —
"It's a Different World" "Empty Chapel"	1966	134 —	142 —	143 —	— —	— —	— —	— —	— —	— —
"A Letter from a Soldier (Dear Mama)" "Somewhere, My Love"	1966	105 —	119 —	119 —	— —	— —	— —	— —	— —	— —
"So Nice (Summer Samba)" "All the Love in the World"	1966	— —	121 —	— —	17 —	— —	— —	— —	— —	— —
"Spanish Nights and You" "Games That Lovers Play"	1966	99 —	81 —	102 —	15 —	— —	— —	— —	— —	— —
"Another Page" "Souvenir d'Italie"	1967	121 —	98 —	103 —	— —	— —	— —	— —	— —	— —
"Time Alone Will Tell" "Born Free"	1967	94 —	114 —	112 —	14 —	— —	— —	— —	— —	— —
"My Heart Cries for You" "Someone Took the Sweetness Out of Sweetheart"	1967	118 —	96 —	116 —	12 —	— —	— —	— —	— —	— —
"Lonely Again" "When You Care a Lot for Someone"	1967	— —	— —	— —	22 —	— —	— —	— —	— —	— —
"My World Is Slipping Away" "Till We're Together"	1967	— —	— —	— —	35 —	— —	— —	— —	— —	— —
"Why Say Goodbye" "Addio, mi 'amore"	1968	132 —	103 —	105 —	27 —	— —	— —	— —	— —	— —
"Somebody Else Is Taking My Place" "Brother, Can You Spare a Dime"	1968	— —	— —	— —	— —	— —	— —	— —	— —	— —
"I Don't Wanna Play House" "The Welfare Check"	1968	— —	— —	— —	40 —	— —	— —	— —	— —	— —
"The Wedding Cake" "Over Hill Underground"	1969	91 —	97 —	92 —	19 —	33 —	— —	96 —	83 —	— —
"Gone Like the Wind" "Am I Blue?"	1969	— —	— —	— —	— —	— —	— —	— —	— —	— —
"Zingara" "Mr. Love"	1969	— —	— —	— —	— —	— —	— —	— —	— —	— —
"—" denotes releases that did not chart or were not released in that territory.

=== 1970–2025 ===
Title (A-side/B-side)	Year	Peak chart positions							
Title (A-side/B-side)	Year	US	US CB	US RW	US AC	US Cou.	AUS	GER	UK
"Don't Turn Around" "I Don't Wanna Walk Without You"	1971	— —	— —	— —	— —	— —	— —	— —	— —
"Should I Tie a Yellow Ribbon Round the Ole Oak Tree? (The Answer)" "Paint the Rain"	1973	104 —	99 —	101 —	— —	— —	73 —	— —	— —
"Burning Bridges" "Let's Go Where the Good Times Go"	1978	— —	— —	— —	— —	— —	— —	— —	— —
"Where the Boys Are" (re-recording) "A-Ba-Ni-Bi"	1978	— —	— —	— —	— —	— —	— —	— —	— —
"My Mother's Eyes" "Lovin' Man"	1978	— —	— —	— —	— —	— —	— —	— —	— —
"Three Good Reasons" "What's Wrong with My World"	1979	— —	— —	— —	— —	— —	— —	— —	— —
"I'm Me Again" "Comme çi, comme ça"	1980	— —	— —	— —	40 —	— —	— —	— —	— —
"There's Still a Few Good Love Songs Left in Me" "Let's Make It Love Tonight"	1983	— —	— —	— —	— —	84 —	— —	— —	— —
"Go, Connie, Go" "Bye Bye Connie"	1992	— —	— —	— —	— —	— —	— —	23 —	— —
"Love Me Tender" (with Elvis Presley) "Heartbreak Hotel" (with Elvis Presley)	2016	— —	— —	— —	— —	— —	— —	— —	— (Note: "Love Me Tender" did not enter the UK Singles Chart, but did peak at number 19 on the Physical Singles Chart.) —
"Pretty Little Baby"	2025	113	—	—	—	—	—	—	— (Note: "Pretty Little Baby" did not enter the UK Singles Chart, but did peak at number 80 on the Singles Sales Chart, and number 76 on the Singles Downloads Chart.)
"—" denotes releases that did not chart or were not released in that territory.

=== German-language singles ===
Title (A-side/B-side)	Year	Peak chart positions		
Title (A-side/B-side)	Year	AUT	GER	NL
"Die Liebe ist ein seltsames Spiel" ("Everybody's Somebody's Fool") "Robot Man"	1960	1 —	3 —	— —
"Ich komm' nie mehr von dir los" ("Many Tears Ago") "Singing the Blues"	1960	— —	39 —	— —
"Wenn ich träume" ("Where the Boys Are") "Niemand"	1961	— —	— —	— —
"Schöner fremder Mann" ("Someone Else's Boy") "Funiculì, Funiculà"	1961	1 —	3 —	— —
"Einmal komm' ich wieder" "Immer und überall"	1961	11 —	16 —	— —
"Eine Insel für zwei" "Das ist zuviel" ("Too Many Rules")	1961	4 —	7 —	— —
"Lili Marleen" "Mond von Mexico"	1962	— 7	9 —	— —
"Tu' mir nicht weh" "Paradiso"	1962	5; 2	2; 2	— —
"Wenn du gehst" "Gondola d'amore"	1962	1 —	2 —	— —
"Barcarole in der Nacht" "Colombino"	1963	2 —	1 —	7 —
"Die Nacht ist mein" "Mein Schiff fährt zu dir" ("Follow the Boys")	1963	4 —	3 —	— —
"Nino" "Jedes Boot hat seinen Hafen"	1964	— 3	12 —	— —
"Napoli" "Meinen Sunny krieg' ich nie mehr wieder"	1964	4 —	12 —	— —
"Ich wär' gerne verliebt" ("Looking for Love") "Ich geb' 'ne Party heut' nacht" ("Let's Have a Party Tonight")	1964	11 —	22 —	— —
"Abends in der Mondscheinallee" "Abschiedsmelodie"	1964	— 8	23 —	— —
"Du mußt bleiben, Angelino" "Jede Liebe geht einmal zu Ende"	1965	11 —	10 —	— —
"Hast du Heimweh" "Weekend-Boy"	1965	— —	— 29	— —
"Mein Herz wird warten" "Denk nicht an die and're"	1965	— —	24 —	— —
"Laß mich geh'n" "Sternenmelodie"	1966	— —	24 —	— —
"Der Mond war schuld daran" "Komm zu mir, Joe"	1966	— —	— —	— —
"Meine Reise ist zu Ende" "Jeder Traum ist einmal ausgeträumt"	1966	— —	— —	— —
"Es ist so schön, daß es dich gibt" "Das soll nie mehr vorübergeh'n"	1966	— —	27 —	— —
"Good-Bye Mama" "Traumboot"	1967	— —	— —	— —
"Alte Liebe rostet nicht" "Keine Liebe ohne Tränen"	1967	— —	— 30	— —
"Lass mich bei dir sein" "Er war nur ein Märchenerzähler"	1968	— —	— —	— —
"Du sagst Goodbye" ("Why Say Goodbye") "Mein Herz ruft nach dir" ("My Heart Cries for You")	1968	— —	— —	— —
"Canzone di Napoli" "Jedem Abend folgt ein Morgen"	1968	— —	— —	— —
"Fahre hinaus mit den Sternen" "Happy Girl"	1969	— —	— —	— —
"Strand der tausend Lieder" "Lissabon"	1969	— —	— —	— —
"Laß mir die bunten Träume" "Gino"	1969	— —	— —	— —
"Ich zähl' die Stunden" "Es begann in einer kleinen Bar"	1970	— —	— —	— —
"Moderne Märchen" "Gitarren der Liebe"	1971	— —	— —	— —
"Meine Welt beginnt bei dir" "Träume und Tränen"	1972	— —	— —	— —
"Lovin' Man" "Heut fiel auf einmal Schnee" ("My Mother's Eyes")	1978	— —	— —	— —
"Jive Connie" "Tribute to Connie"	1992	2 —	2 —	— —
"—" denotes releases that did not chart or were not released in that territory.

=== French-language singles ===
Title (A-side/B-side)	Year
"Je sais qu'un gars" ("Where the Boys Are") "Personne" ("No One")	1961
"Jamais" "Lily Marlène"	1961
"C'est lui que je veux" ("Someone Else's Boy") "Faut pas faire ça" ("Too Many Rules")	1961
"Mon cœur est un violon" "Mister Twister"	1962
"En suivant mon cœur" ("Follow the Boys") "Toutes les étoiles" ("Gondola d'amore")	1963
"Paradiso" "Toutes les étoiles" ("Gondola d'amore")	1963
"Oh oui j'en ai rêvé" ("If My Pillow Could Talk") "Danke Schön"	1963
"Décidément" "Quand je te regarde"	1964
"Que devient ma vie" ("Don't Ever Leave Me") "Un amour d'été" ("We Have Something More")	1964
"Tu m'oublies quand tu t'en vas" ("Roundabout") "La vie en rose"	1965
"Mon cœur pleure pour vous" ("My Heart Cries for You") "Un autre amour" ("Your Other Love")	1967

=== Italian-language singles ===
Title (A-side/B-side)	Year	Peak chart positions
Title (A-side/B-side)	Year	IT
"Capatosta Sweet" "Aiutami a piangere"	1961	— —
"Roman Guitar (Chitarra romana)" "Aiutami a piangere"	1961	3; 3
"Un volo di gabbiani" "Just Say I Love Him"	1961	— —
"Baby Roo" "La valle senza eco" ("Breakin' in a Brand New Broken Heart")	1961	— 6
"Lili Marlen" "La più bella notte dell'anno" ("The Loveliest Night of the Year")	1961	15 —
"Ti conquisterò" ("Someone Else's Boy") "La paloma"	1961	— 10
"Mister Twister" "Kissin' Twist"	1962	— —
"Baby" ("Pretty Little Baby") "Luna caprese"	1962	— 8
"Violino tzigano" "Dammi la mano e corri"	1962	11 —
"Io sola andrò" ("I'm So Alone") "Un violino nel mio cuore"	1962	11; 10
"Un bacio all'Italiana" ("Zwei kleine Italiener") "Torna, torna, torna" ("Nino")	1962	— —
"Malafemmena" "Portami con te" ("Fly Me to the Moon")	1963	— —
"Per sempre con te" ("Everybody's Somebody's Fool") "Robot Man"	1963	— —
"Per sempre con te" ("Follow the Boys") "Ninna nanna per un bimbo"	1963	— —
"Nessuno è solo" "Grazie a te" ("Danke Schoen")	1963	— —
"Il primo bacio e l'ultimo" "Mi ricorderò"	1964	— —
"Una notte così" "Il primo bacio e l'ultimo"	1964	— —
"Triste domani" ("Blue Winter") "Una notte così"	1964	— —
"In cerca d'amore" ("Looking for Love") "Non vuoi baciarmi" ("Don't Ever Leave Me")	1964	— —
"Ho bisogno di vederti" "Un altro amore" ("Who's Heart Are You Breaking Tonight")	1965	— —
"C'è una cosa che non sai" ("No Better Off") "Forget Domani"	1965	— —
"Misteriosamente" ("Roundabout") "For Mama"	1966	— —
"Cosa c'è che non va" ("Love Is Me, Love Is You") "Dove, non so" ("Somewhere, My Love")	1966	— —
"Notti di spagna" ("Spanish Nights and You") "Regent's Park"	1966	— —
"Canta ragazzina" "Per questa notte"	1967	— —
"Non dirlo mai" ("Why Say Goodbye") "Addio mi amore"	1968	— —
"—" denotes releases that did not chart.

=== Spanish-language singles ===
Title (A-side/B-side) (Note: Prior to 1968, releases in Spain were as EPs, so the below are the A1 and A2 tracks.)	Year	Peak chart positions
Title (A-side/B-side)	Year	SPA
"Malagueña" "Quiéreme mucho"	1960	— —
"Granada" "Quizás, Quizás, Quizás"	1960	7
"Celos" ("Jalousie") "Solamente una vez"	1960	18
"Ana" "Creemos en al amor" ("Three Coins in the Fountain")	1961	— —
"El novio de otra" ("Someone Else's Boy") "Donde hay chicos" ("Where the Boys Are")	1961	1
"Linda muchachita" ("Pretty Little Baby") "Abrazo de corazón" ("When the Boy in Your Arms")	1962	1 —
"Mr. Twister" "Hey Ring-a-Ding"	1962	18 —
"La paloma" "Mi corazón te adora" ("Don't Break the Heart That Loves You")	1962	— —
"Esta es mi noche" ("Tonight's My Night") "Llévame a la luna" ("Fly Me to the Moon")	1963	— —
"La gente" "Lili Marlen"	1963	12
"En busca de amor" ("Looking for Love") "Vamos a la reunion" ("Let's Have a Party")	1964	— —
"No, no me dejes" ("Don't Ever Leave Me") "Bésame Mucho"	1964	— —
"Qué solo estoy" ("I'm So Alone") "Donde hay chicos" ("Where the Boys Are")	1965	— —
"La novia" "Cuando calienta el sol" ("Love Me with All Your Heart")	1965	— —
"Mistereosamente" ("Roundabout") "Milord"	1965	— —
"Un mundo differente" ("It's a Different World") "La capilla vacia" ("Empty Chapel")	1966	— —
"Por qué decir adiós?" ("Why Say Goodbye") "Noches españolas" ("Spanish Nights and You")	1968	— —
"Noches españolas" ("Spanish Nights and You") (Note: "Noches españolas" was released as a single in the US.) "Invierno triste (azul)" ("Blue Winter")	1969	— —
"—" denotes releases that did not chart or were not released in that territory.

=== Japanese-language singles ===
Title (A-side/B-side)	Year	Peak chart positions
Title (A-side/B-side)	Year	JPN
"Atashi no" ("Where the Boys Are") (Note: "Atashi no" was released in the US as either a limited or promotional release.) "Swanee"	1961	— —
"Where the Boys Are" "Don't Be Cruel"	1961	— —
"Someone Else's Boy" "Breakin' in a Brand New Broken Heart"	1961	8 —
"Too Many Rules" "Pretty Little Baby"	1962	1 —
"Mr. Twister" "Telephone Lover"	1962	— —
"Don't Break the Heart That Loves You" "Vacation"	1962	— —
"Vacation" "It Happened Last Night"	1962	1 —
"Follow the Boys" "Follow the Boys" (English Version)	1963	— —
"Tonight's My Night" "I'm Gonna Be Warm This Winter"	1963	— —
"If My Pillow Could Talk" "You're the Only One Can Hurt Me"	1963	— —
"Baby's First Christmas" "Winter Wonderland"	1963	— —
"Your Other Love" "Danke Schoen"	1964	— —
"Lollypop Lips" "Who's Sorry Now"	1964	— —
"Looking for Love" "Whatever Happened to Rosemarie"	1964	— —
"Hanasanaide" ("Don't Ever Leave Me") "Heart de Kiss" ("Looking for Love")	1965	— —
"Roundabout" "Roundabout" (English Version)	1966	— —
"I Wish I Had a Wooden Heart" "All the Love in the World"	1967	— —
"—" denotes releases that did not chart or were not released in that territory.
