= 20 All-Time Greats =

Compilation album by Connie Francis
- Released: May 1977
- Recorded: 1958-1965
- Genres: Pop; Rock 'n' roll
- Length: 31 minutes 40 seconds
- Labels: Polydor; 2391 290

Connie Francis chronology
| Connie Francis Sings the Songs of Les Reed (1969) | 20 All-Time Greats (1977) | Who's Happy Now? (1978) |

20 All-Time Greats is a compilation album of American singer Connie Francis's hits, released by Polydor Records in early 1977. The album became her most successful British compilation.

== Background, recording, and content ==
Connie Francis was one of the most popular American female vocalists of the 1950s and 60s. Francis semi-retired from the music industry in 1970, and new material was rarely released. But, in 1977 there was a rock 'n' Roll Revival. This led her record label Polydor to consider releasing her first compilation since the 1960s, as Francis had several rock 'n' roll hits.

The compilation included twenty tracks. The only British-only release included on the compilation was 1965's "My Child", which was Francis' second-to-last hit single in the country.

== Critical reception ==
Professional ratings
Review scores
| Source | Rating |
|---|---|
| Encyclopedia of Popular Music | 4/5 stars |

The Encyclopedia of Popular Music gave the album a four-star rating, which meant they believed the album was "outstanding".

== Release and chart performance ==
20 All-Time Greats was released by Polydor Records under the MGM name in May 1977 and was the first album Francis released since 1969's Connie Francis Sings the Songs of Les Reed. The album was offered as a vinyl LP in multiple territories. It did not receive any single releases, but it successfully reached the album charts. The album debuted on the UK Official Charts Company's Albums Chart in the issue dated June 18, 1977, peaking at No. 1 for two weeks in September during its twenty-two weeks on the chart.

== Track listing ==
Side One
| No. | Title | Writer(s) | Length |
|---|---|---|---|
| 1. | "Who's Sorry Now?" | Bert Kalmer; Harry Ruby; Ted Snyder |
| 2. | "Stupid Cupid" | Howard Greenfield; Neil Sedaka |
| 3. | "My Happiness" | Borney Bergantine; Betty Peterson |
| 4. | "Everybody's Somebody's Fool" | Howard Greenfield; Jack Keller |
| 5. | "Carolina Moon" | Joe Burke; Benny Davis |
| 6. | "Plenty Good Lovin'" | Connie Francis |
| 7. | "Where the Boys Are" | Howard Greenfield; Neil Sedaka |
| 8. | "Robot Man" | John D. Loudermilk; Marijohn Wilkin |
| 9. | "When the Boy in Your Arms (Is the Boy in Your Heart)" | Aaron Schroeder; Sidney Wyche (Bennett) |
| 10. | "Mama" | Cesare Andrea Bixio; Bixio Cherubini; Harold Barlow; Phil Brito; Bruno Baroni; Turner |

Side Two
| No. | Title | Writer(s) | Length |
|---|---|---|---|
| 11. | "Lipstick on Your Collar" | Edna Lewis; John D. Loudermilk |
| 12. | "Among My Souvenirs" | Edgar Leslie; Horatio Nicholls |
| 13. | "Many Tears Ago" | Winfield Scott |
| 14. | "Breakin' in a Brand New Broken Heart" | Howard Greenfield; Jack Keller |
| 15. | "V-A-C-A-T-I-O-N" | Connie Francis; Hank Hunter; Gary Weston |
| 16. | "Together" | Buddy G. DeSylva; Lew Brown; Ray Henderson |
| 17. | "Jealous Heart" | Jenny Lou Carson |
| 18. | "You Always Hurt the One You Love" | Allan Roberts; Doris Fisher |
| 19. | "My Heart Has a Mind of Its Own" | Howard Greenfield; Jack Keller |
| 20. | "My Child" | Connie Francis; Bobby Lewis |

== Chart performance ==
Chart performance for 20 All-Time Greats
| Chart (1977) | Peak position |
|---|---|
| UK Official Albums Chart | 1 |

== Release history ==
Release history and formats for 20 All-Time Greats
| Region | Date | Format | Label | Ref. |
|---|---|---|---|---|
| United Kingdom and Ireland | May 1977 | Vinyl (LP) | Polydor | |
| New Zealand, Netherlands, and South Africa | Mid 1977 | Vinyl (LP) | Polydor | |
