= The Very Best of Connie Francis – Connie's 15 Biggest Hits =

Compilation album by Connie Francis
- Released: October 1963
- Recorded: October 2, 1957 – September 27, 1962
- Studio: Several in New York City and California
- Genre: Pop; rock 'n' roll
- Length: 37:57
- Label: MGM; SE 4167/E 4167
- Producer: Danny Davis; Morton Craft; Harry A. Mayerson; Ray Ellis; Arnold Maxin; Jim Vienneau; Jesse Kaye

Connie Francis chronology
| "Mala Femmena" and Connie's Big Hits from Italy (1963) | The Very Best of Connie Francis – Connie's 15 Biggest Hits (1963) | In the Summer of His Years (1963) |

The Very Best of Connie Francis – Connie's 15 Biggest Hits is the third compilation album by American singer Connie Francis, released in October 1963 by MGM Records. The project compiled many of Francis' most successful singles from the past six years, including her final top-20 hit released in early 1963, "Follow the Boys". The album reached the top-75 of the US pop albums charts and was her only album to remain in print for several decades, receiving a Gold certification from the RIAA in June 1969 for selling over 500,000 copies. It was eventually made available as an 8-track cartridge in 1968, as a CD in 1986, and rereleased to streaming platforms circa 2020. The compilation also received praise from music critics, receiving four-star or higher ratings. Notably, critic David McGee believed that Francis had an "extraordinary voice", even though the songs were "lacking in material".

== Background and content ==
"Follow the Boys"
Sample of "Follow the Boys". The song is Francis' final top-20 pop hit and the most recent single on the compilation.

A retrospective collection, it contains 15 singles from the singer's six-year span of major pop hits, ranging from "Who's Sorry Now?" (1957) to "Follow the Boys" (1963). The material was recorded between October 1957 and September 1962, under several producers, the most notable of which were Jim Vienneau, Ray Ellis and her current producer Danny Davis. Featuring her most commercially successful songs, the album features three US Billboard Hot 100 chart toppers ("My Heart Has a Mind of Its Own", "Everybody's Somebody's Fool", "Don't Break the Heart That Loves You"), with her being the first female vocalist to top the chart. The album included some rock 'n' roll hits for her as well, ("Stupid Cupid", "Lipstick on Your Collar", "Frankie"). Other pop top-ten singles selected were "My Happiness", "Second Hand Love", "Breakin' in a Brand New Broken Heart", "Where the Boys Are", and "Vacation", the latter of which was co-written by Francis and her final top-ten in both the US and UK. "I'm Gonna Be Warm This Winter" along with "Follow the Boys" were the only top-20 hits. "Follow the Boys" and "Where the Boys Are" served as title tracks for their respective motion pictures, both starring Francis.

== Critical reception ==
Professional ratings
Review scores
| Source | Rating |
|---|---|
| AllMusic | 4.5/5 stars |
| Encyclopedia of Popular Music | 4/5 stars |
| The Rolling Stone Album Guide | 4/5 stars |
| Billboard | Positive (Spotlight) |
| Cashbox | Positive (Pop Picks) |

=== Contemporary reception ===
The Very Best of Connie Francis – Connie's 15 Biggest Hits was given a positive critical response following its release. Billboard magazine stated that the "Here's a great collection of Connie's standout hits over the years, starting with her very first smash, 'Who's Sorry Now.'" They believed that the "Fans should be delighted." Cashbox magazine stated that "The multitudes of Connie Francis fans the world over should welcome this latest entry, which boasts 15 of the lark's biggest hits all wrapped up in one blockbuster package." They added, "The songstress reaches back for her first disk success with 'Who's Sorry Now,' and follows it with such moneymakers as 'Lipstick On Your Collar,' 'Stupid Cupid,' 'Follow the Boys' and many others." The publication concluded that "Chart status seems assured."

=== Retrospective reviews ===
Cub Koda on AllMusic said "Though many best-ofs exist on the market, this one leans more heavily toward her earlier rock & roll hits," giving it a four-and-a-half star rating. David McGee on The Rolling Stone Album Guide said that "However lacking in depth her material may have been—and it was drippy—Francis boasted an extraordinary voice that could wring the last teardrop out of the most saccharine tune," but Mcgee also stated that "some credit must go to the variety of producers she worked with." It was given a four-star rating by the Encyclopedia of Popular Music as well. The rating meant that it was a "high standard album" from Francis and "therefore highly recommended".

== Release ==
The Very Best of Connie Francis – Connie's 15 Biggest Hits was released by MGM Records in late October 1963 and was the third compilation album of her career. It followed her greatest hits compilations, both of which scored her top-40 chart entries. The album was originally offered as a vinyl LP, with seven songs on side one and eight on side two. It was available both in stereo and monaural sound. In January 1968, it was also issued as a stereo 8-track cartridge by the same label in the United States during a major push by MGM to make their catalogue available on the format. In Canada, Polydor Records started selling the album as an 8-track cartridge in 1973. The album was rereleased as compact disc in 1986. It was made available on multiple streaming platforms circa 2020 by Universal Music Group, containing six bonus tracks.

== Commercial performance ==
Unlike Connie's Greatest Hits, The Very Best of Connie Francis reached the record charts only in the United States. The album debuted on Billboard magazine's Top LP's chart in the issue dated November 2, 1963, peaking at No. 68 during a twenty-three-week run on the chart. It entered Cashbox magazine's Top 100 Albums chart in the issue dated November 23, 1963, peaking at No. 73 during a nine-week run on the chart. The album remained a consistent seller throughout the decade. It was eventually certified Gold by the Recording Industry Association of America (RIAA) for shipments of 500,000 copies on June 11, 1969, with it being her only album to achieve this status.

== Track listing ==
Side One
| No. | Title | Writer(s) | Length |
|---|---|---|---|
| 1. | "Who's Sorry Now?" | Ted Snyder, Bert Kalmar, Harry Ruby | 2:16 |
| 2. | "Everybody's Somebody's Fool" | Jack Keller, Howard Greenfield | 2:40 |
| 3. | "Follow the Boys" | Guy Wood, Ben Raleigh | 2:40 |
| 4. | "Lipstick on Your Collar" | George Goehring, Edna Lewis | 2:25 |
| 5. | "My Happiness" | Betty Peterson Blasco, Borney Bergantine | 2:28 |
| 6. | "Vacation" | Connie Francis, Hank Hunter, Gary Weston | 2:26 |
| 7. | "Among My Souvenirs" | Edgar Leslie, Lawrence Wright | 2:28 |
| Total length: | | | 17:23 |

Side Two
| No. | Title | Writer(s) | Length |
|---|---|---|---|
| 1. | "Where the Boys Are" | Neil Sedaka, Howard Greenfield | 2:37 |
| 2. | "Frankie" | Neil Sedaka, Howard Greenfield | 2:35 |
| 3. | "I'm Gonna Be Warm This Winter" | Hank Hunter, Dick Barkan | 2:25 |
| 4. | "My Heart Has a Mind of Its Own" | Jack Keller, Howard Greenfield | 2:26 |
| 5. | "Second Hand Love" | Hank Hunter, Phil Spector | 2:48 |
| 6. | "Don't Break the Heart That Loves You" | Benny Davis, Murray Mencher | 2:58 |
| 7. | "Stupid Cupid" | Neil Sedaka, Howard Greenfield | 2:10 |
| 8. | "Breakin' in a Brand New Broken Heart" | Jack Keller, Howard Greenfield | 2:35 |
| Total length: | | | 20:34 |

== Charts ==
Chart performance for The Very Best of Connie Francis – Connie's 15 Biggest Hits
| Chart (1963–1964) | Peak position |
|---|---|
| US Billboard Top LPs | 68 |
| US Cashbox Top 100 Albums | 73 |

== Certifications ==
Certifications for The Very Best of Connie Francis – Connie's 15 Biggest Hits
| Region | Certification | Certified units/sales |
|---|---|---|
| United States (RIAA) | Gold | 500,000^{^} |
^{^} Shipments figures based on certification alone.

== Release history ==
Release history and formats for The Very Best of Connie Francis – Connie's 15 Biggest Hits
| Region | Date | Format | Label | Ref. |
|---|---|---|---|---|
| United States and Canada | October 1963 | Vinyl (LP) | MGM | |
| Other territories | Early 1964 | Vinyl (LP) | MGM | |
| United States | January 1968 | 8-track cartridge | MGM | |
| Canada | 1973 | 8-track cartridge | Polydor | |
| United States and Canada | Late 1986 | Compact disc | Polydor | |
| Worldwide | Circa 2020 | Digital; streaming | Universal Music Group | |

== Personnel ==
All credits are adapted from the liner notes of The Very Best of Connie Francis – Connie's 15 Biggest Hits and from each respective single's liner notes.

- Jerry Andrea – cover drawing
- Val Valentin – director of engineering
- Danny Davis – producer
- Harry A. Mayerson – producer
- Arnold Maxin – producer
- Morton Craft – producer
- Ray Ellis – producer
- Jim Vienneau – producer
- Jesse Kaye – producer
