= Connie's Greatest Hits =

Compilation album by Connie Francis
- Released: November 1959
- Recorded: October 10, 1957; March 20, 1958; June 9, 1958; June 18, 1958; September 2, 1958; November 6, 1958; February 2, 1959; April 15, 1959; July 7, 1959
- Genres: Pop, rock and roll
- Length: 28:28
- Labels: MGM; E-3793 (mono)
- Producers: Harry A. Myerson, Ray Ellis

Connie Francis chronology
Christmas In My Heart (1959)	Connie's Greatest Hits (1959)	Rock 'n' Roll Million Sellers (1959)

Singles from Connie's Greatest Hits
- 1. "I'm Sorry I Made You Cry" Released: April 1958; 2. "Stupid Cupid" Released: June 1958; 3. "Fallin'" Released: September 1958; 4. "My Happiness" Released: November 1958; 5. "If I Didn't Care" Released: February 1959; 6. "Frankie" Released: May 1959; 7. "You're Gonna Miss Me/Plenty Good Lovin'" Released: August 1959

Connie's Greatest Hits is a compilation album by American singer Connie Francis, released in 1959. The album features the songs from Francis' most successful singles from her breakthrough hit "Who's Sorry Now?" in early 1958 up to the date of the album's release in November 1959.

== Chart performance ==
The compilation album debuted on Billboard magazine's Billboard Best-Selling Monophonic LPs chart in the issue dated February 26, 1960, and in October of next year, it peaked at No. 17 on the chart. In total, the LP stayed on the chart for 100 weeks, the longest run of any of her albums. The album also reached No. 19 on the Cashbox Best-Selling Monaural Albums. Overseas it did a bit better, reaching No. 16 in the UK. It also peaked at a surprising No. 1 in Canada.

== Rereleases ==
The album was repackaged with a new cover design and re-released in March 1962. In 2012, Connie's Greatest Hits was re-released by Hallmark Records in their "Original Recordings" series, with "Who's Sorry Now" replaced by "Robot Man", "Frankie" replaced by "Valentino" and "Lipstick on Your Collar" replaced by "It Would Be Worth It"

== Track listing ==
=== Side A ===
#	Title	Songwriter	Length
1.	"Who's Sorry Now"	Ted Snyder, Bert Kalmar, Harry Ruby	2.16
2.	"Fallin'"	Neil Sedaka, Howard Greenfield	2.13
3.	"Happy Days and Lonely Nights"	Billy Rose, Fred Fisher	2.07
4.	"Stupid Cupid"	Neil Sedaka, Howard Greenfield	2.13
5.	"Carolina Moon"	Joe Burke, Benny Davis	2.32
6.	"Plenty Good Lovin'"	Connie Francis	2.03

=== Side B ===
#	Title	Songwriter	Length
1.	"Frankie"	Neil Sedaka, Howard Greenfield	2.30
2.	"You're Gonna Miss Me"	Eddie Curtis	2.43
3.	"Lipstick on Your Collar"	George Goehring, Edna Lewis	2.18
4.	"If I Didn't Care"	Jack Lawrence	2.37
5.	"My Happiness"	Borney Bergantine, Betty Peterson	2.29
6.	"I'm Sorry I Made You Cry"	Jeannine Clesi	2.27

== Charts ==
Chart (1960–1961)	Peak position
US Billboard Best-Selling Monophonic LPs	17
US Cashbox Best-Selling Monaural Albums	19
UK Record Retailer Top LPs	16
CAN CHUM Top Ten Albums	1
