= Ich komm' nie mehr von dir los =

Single by Connie Francis
- B-side: "Singin' the Blues"
- Released: December 1960
- Recorded: November 9, 1960 (A-side); July 10, 1959 (B-side)
- Genre: Rock and roll, schlager
- Length: 1:55
- Label: MGM 61 035
- Songwriters: Winfield Scott, Toby Lüth
- Producers: Gerhard Mendelsohn, Arnold Maxin

Connie Francis German singles chronology
"'Die Liebe ist ein seltsames Spiel'" / "'Robot Man'" (1960)	"Ich komm' nie mehr von dir los" (1960)	"'Wenn ich träume'" / "'Niemand'" (1961)

Ich komm' nie mehr von dir los is the second German single recorded by U. S. entertainer Connie Francis.

The song is the German cover version of Francis' U. S. recording "Many Tears Ago", of which she recorded 4 versions in total:

- English
- German
- Italian (as Piangere per te mai più)
- Spanish (as Dime que paso)

After Francis' German debut single Die Liebe ist ein seltsames Spiel had peaked sensationally at # 1 on the Munich charts, Ich komm' nie mehr von dir los scored a rather disappointing chart position by peaking only at # 35.

The B-side of Ich komm' nie mehr von dir los was Singin' the Blues, an English recording from her 1959 album Country & Western – Golden Hits.
