= More Greatest Hits (Connie Francis album) =

Compilation album by Connie Francis
- Released: May 1961
- Recorded: August 28, 1959; October 14, 1959; January 25, 1960; January 27, 1960; April 7, 1960; July 6, 1960; July 25, 1960; September 9, 1960; October 18, 1960; December 27, 1960
- Genre: Pop
- Labels: MGM; E-3942 (mono)/SE-3942 (stereo)
- Producers: Ray Ellis, Norman Newell, Arnold Maxin

Connie Francis chronology
Connie Francis at the Copa (1961)	More Greatest Hits (1961)	Connie Francis sings "Never on Sunday" (1961)

Singles from More Greatest Hits
- 1. "My Heart Has a Mind of Its Own" Released: August 1960

More Greatest Hits is a compilation album by United States entertainer Connie Francis. The album features the songs from Francis' most successful singles on the American market from her 1959 hit "Among My Souvenirs" up to the date of the album's release in May 1961.

== Background ==
The album is notable for its change in track listing after its initial release. First pressings of the album featured "Teddy" as track five of the B-side. Copyright issues between MGM Records, Francis' own song publishing company Francon Music Inc. and the song's composer Paul Anka led to the replacement of "Teddy" by the Kadish Millett composition "Valentino."

"Valentino" had never been a U. S. single but it had been a modest hit for Francis in Europe and was subsequently covered in the native languages of several European countries such as Germany (recorded by Caterina Valente as well as Angèle Durand) and The Netherlands (recorded by The Fouryo's). "Valentino" was also featured in different versions on the album: The stereo pressings contained the single vocal take of the song while the mono pressings contained the double vocal version where Francis harmonized with herself.

== Track listing ==
=== Side A ===
#	Title	Songwriter	Length	Remark
1.	"Jealous of You (Tango della Gelosia)"	Giuseppe Mendes, Vittorio Mascheroni, Marjorie Harper	2.28	-
2.	"My Heart Has a Mind of Its Own"	Jack Keller, Howard Greenfield	2.30	-
3.	"Everybody's Somebody's Fool"	Jack Keller, Howard Greenfield	2.37	-
4.	"Mama"	Bruno Cherubini, Harold Barlow, Phil Brito	3.55	-
5.	"No One"	Doc Pomus, Mort Shuman	2.48	-
6.	"God Bless America"	Irving Berlin	2.34	-

=== Side B ===
#	Title	Songwriter	Length	Remark
1.	"Among My Souvenirs"	Lawrence Wright, Edgar Leslie	2.30	Simulated stereo only on stereo pressings as the song was never mixed to true stereo.
2.	"Where the Boys Are"	Neil Sedaka, Howard Greenfield	2.43	-
3.	"Many Tears Ago"	Winfield Scott	1.55	-
4.	"Malagueña"	Ernesto Lecuona	3.06	-
5a.	"Teddy"	Paul Anka	2.38	Only on first pressings
5b.	"Valentino"	Kadish Millett	2.30	Replacement for "Teddy" on later pressings Single vocal version on stereo pressings
5c.	"Valentino"	Kadish Millett	2.30	Replacement for "Teddy" on later pressings Double vocal version on mono pressings
6.	"Senza Mamma e Nnammurata"	Luigi Donadio, Connie Francis	4.01	-
