= Jamais =

Jamais is French for "never".

Jamais may refer to:

- "Jamais" (song), a French single recorded by American entertainer Connie Francis. It is a French reworking of Sebastián Yradier's classic tale about a white dove, La Paloma
- Jamais vu, from French, meaning "never seen"), phenomenon of experiencing a situation that one recognizes in some fashion, but that nonetheless seems very unfamiliar with
- La Jamais Contente, first vehicle to go over 100 kilometres per hour
