= My Greatest Songs =

My Greatest Songs may refer to:

- My Greatest Songs (Etta James album)
- My Greatest Songs, a 1999 album by Pat Boone
- My Greatest Songs, a 1992 compilation album by Paul Anka
- My Greatest Songs, a 1964 album by Connie Francis
