= Connie Francis en El Patio =

Compilation album by Connie Francis
- Released: 1964
- Recorded: December 1960 – February 1964
- Genre: Pop
- Label: MGM
- Producer: Danny Davis and others

Connie Francis en El Patio is a 12" studio album recorded by American pop singer Connie Francis. The track listing consist of a compilation of Francis' most successful Spanish language pop recordings released between 1960 and 1964.

The album was released in Mexico in 1965 and is one of Francis' rarest albums to find because only a very limited quantity of copies were released.

== Track listing ==
=== Side A ===
#	Title	Songwriter	Length
1.	"Gracias"	Augusto Alguerro	2.22
2.	"Detrás del amor (Follow the boys)"	Ted Murry, Benny Davis	2.43
3.	"Donde hay chicos (Where the boys are)"	Neil Sedaka, Howard Greenfield	2.29
4.	"Qué sola estoy (I'm so alone)"	Gary Geld	3.01
5.	"Tanto control (Too many rules)"	Don Stirlin, Gary Temkin	2.26
6.	"Esta es mi noche (Tonight's my night)"	Ted Murry, Benny Davis	2.37

=== Side B ===
#	Title	Songwriter	Length
1.	"Invierno triste azul (Blue Winter)"	Ben Raleigh, John Gluck, jr	2.26
2.	"Tú otro amor (Your Other Love)"	Claus Ogerman, Ben Raleigh	2.20
3.	"El novio de otra (Someone else's boy)"	Athina Hosey, Hal Gordon	2.43
4.	"Mister Twister" (Spanish Version)	Eddie Curtis	2.16
5.	"Dime que pasó (Many Tears Ago)"	Winfield Scott	1.58
6.	"Danke schön" (Spanish version)	Bert Kaempfert, Kurt Schwabach, Milt Gabler	2.42

NOTE: As far as cover versions of Francis' US hits are listed, only the songwriters of the original English-language versions are given; the Spanish lyricists are unknown.
