= Robot Man (song) =

1960 song

Single by Connie Francis
- B-side: "Mama"
- Released: May 1960
- Genre: Pop
- Label: MGM
- Songwriters: Sylvia Dee, George Goehring
- Producer: F. Day Biem

Connie Francis singles chronology
"My Heart Has a Mind of Its Own" (1960)	"Robot Man" (1960)	"Many Tears Ago" (1960)

Audio
- "Robot Man" on YouTube

"Robot Man" is a 1960 song performed by Connie Francis. It was written by the songwriting team of Sylvia Dee and George Goehring.

The song became a hit in the United Kingdom, reaching #2 on the UK Singles Chart in 1960. It was also a hit in Australia (#3) and New Zealand (#4).

Another version of the song was released in the U.S. in 1960 by singer Jamie Horton on the Joy label. It reached #87 on the Music Vendor Top 100 and #12 on the Cash Box Looking Ahead chart.

In "Robot Man," the singer wishes for a man who is an automaton instead of "a real-life boy" to "give her grief" and leave her "crying in her handkerchief." A robotic man would be dependable and predictable, with no need to worry about him cheating, neglecting her, lying to her or arguing with her.

== Chart history ==
Chart (1960–1961)	Peak position
Australia (Kent Music Report)	3
New Zealand (Lever Hit Parade)	4
UK Singles (OCC)	2
