= Live at The Sahara in Las Vegas =

Live album by Connie Francis
- Released: October 1966
- Recorded: May 13–16, 1966
- Genre: Pop
- Label: MGM Records; E-4411 (mono)/SE-4411 (stereo)
- Producer: Tom Wilson

Connie Francis chronology
Movie Greats of the 60s (1966)	Live at The Sahara in Las Vegas (1966)	Connie's Christmas (1966)

Live at The Sahara in Las Vegas is a live album recorded by American singer Connie Francis.

== Background ==
In May 1966, Connie Francis fulfilled one of her regular engagements at The Sahara Hotel in Las Vegas, appearing on stage at the hotel's Congo Room. Accompaniment was provided by The Lou Basil Orchestra under the direction of Joe Mazzu.

Six of these shows were recorded between May 13 and May 16 with the most suitable parts selected, edited and mixed in early October 1966 to create the album which was released later that same month. Three of the selections were not included into the final album and remain unreleased to this day.

== Track listing ==
=== Side A ===
#	Title	Songwriter	Length
-	Opening	uncredited	1.03
1.	Once in a Life Time	A. Newley, L. Bricusse	2.10
2.	One of Those Songs (La Bal De Madame De Mortemouille)	G. Calvi, W. Holt	2.10
3.	Medley: a.) My Heart Reminds Me b.) Yesterday	a.) C. Bargoni, A. Stillman, P. Siegel b.) P. McCartney, J. Lennon	3.20
4.	La Bamba	traditional	2.12
5.	Sunrise, Sunset	J. Bock, S. Harnick	3.18
6.	Country Medley: a.) Please Don't Sell My Daddy No More Wine b.) Gotta Travel On c.) I Can't Stop Loving You d.) Queen of the House	a.) T. Lane b.) traditional c.) D. Gibson d.) R. Miller, M. Taylor	4.41

=== Side B ===
#	Title	Songwriter	Length
1.	I Left My Heart in San Francisco	G. Cory, D. Cross	3.50
2.	Mama	C. A. Bixio, B. Cherubini	3.39
3.	Will You Still Be Mine	M. Dennis, T. Adair	2.15
4.	Who's Sorry Now	T. Snyder, B. Kalmar, H. Ruby	2.11
5.	Al di là	C. Donida, Mogol	3.02
6.	Finale - Gospel Medley: a.) Up Above My Head b.) Glory, Glory c.) Light of Love	a.) Sister R. Tharpe b.) J. W. Howe, W. Steffe c.) traditional	2.45

=== Not included selections ===
#	Title	Songwriter	Remark
1.	The Shadow of Your Smile	J. Mandel, P. F. Webster	unreleased
2.	The Lady Is a Tramp	Rodgers and Hart	unreleased
3.	Johnny Mercer Medley (no song titles specified)	J. Mercer	unreleased
