= Malagueña (song) =

Song by Ernesto Lecuona

"Malagueña" (Spanish pronunciation: [malaˈɣeɲa], from Málaga) is a song by Cuban composer Ernesto Lecuona. It was originally the sixth movement of Lecuona's Suite Andalucía (1933), to which he added lyrics in Spanish. The song has since become a popular, in a variety of styles including jazz, marching band, and drum and bugle corps and also has been provided with lyrics in several languages. In general terms, malagueñas are flamenco dance styles with pasodoble elements from Málaga, in the southeast of Spain.

== Origins ==
The melodic themes which form the basis of "Malagueña" were not of Ernesto Lecuona's invention, having been prominent in Spanish folk songs named "malagueñas" for several centuries, though at least one was popularised internationally by 19th-century American composer Louis Moreau Gottschalk in his solo piano composition Souvenirs d'Andalousie (English: Memories of Andalusia).

The malagueña originates in the fandango style of Málaga, hence its name. It was also exported to the Canary Islands around the 18th century by Spanish mariners, where it has developed its own separate identity as the malagueña canaria, with a distinct style for different islands ranging from variations similar to the original fandango, to slower and more lamenting melodies such as those from the island of Tenerife. On the island of Fuerteventura the malagueña de los novios (English: of the bride and groom) is played at weddings in honour of the nuptials, and is much more elegant.

== Notable vocal performances ==
"Malagueña"

Single by Connie Francis

from the album More Greatest Hits
- A-side: "My Heart Has a Mind of Its Own"
- Released: 1960
- Recorded: 1960
- Genre: Pop; flamenco
- Length: 3:06
- Label: MGM
- Songwriters: Ernesto Lecuona, Marian Banks
- Producer: Norman Newell

Connie Francis singles chronology
| "Everybody's Somebody's Fool" / "Jealous of You" (1960) | "My Heart Has a Mind of Its Own" / "Malagueña" (1960) | "Many Tears Ago" / "Senza Mamma e Nnammurata" (1960) |

A German-language version, sung by Caterina Valente, with Werner Müller's orchestra, was very popular in the United States (not making the Billboard chart, but charting on Cashbox, peaking at No. 42) in February 1955. Valente also sang "Malagueña" in Spanish. English lyrics were written by Marian Banks and a later charting version was recorded by Connie Francis in 1960 that reached No. 42 on Billboard's chart as the flip-side of her No. 1 pop hit "My Heart Has a Mind of Its Own", which were included on her 1961 compilation album More Greatest Hits.

In 1962, Violetta Villas recorded "Malagueña" in German- and Polish-language versions. Singers Vigen Derderian and Googoosh adapted the song for Iranian pop.

== Notable instrumental performances ==
Lecuona's "Malagueña" was recorded by the composer as a piano solo on the 1955 RCA Victor LP Lecuona Plays Lecuona. The recording is available on RCA/BMG CD compilations and reissues.

As a pianist, Stan Kenton first had the piece arranged for the Sketches on Standards LP in 1956, which mostly went unnoticed at that time. After the 1960 Connie Francis version, Bill Holman's 1961 arrangement for the Stan Kenton Orchestra re-imagined the song again as a fiery big band showpiece, with an even larger orchestra. Performances of this arrangement appeared on Kenton's 1962 Grammy Award-winning album Adventures In Jazz and on the 1962 American TV show Jazz Scene USA.

Marco Rizo's solo piano performance of "Malagueña" can be found in Lecuona, a Musical Legacy. Rizo, who in 1938 became the official pianist of the Havana Philharmonic, performed under the direction of Maestro Ernesto Lecuona and gave duo piano recitals with Lecuona in 1939.

Sabicas adapted it for flamenco-style guitar, and it was included on his 1957 album, Sabicas Vol. 2, on Elektra Records. This recording was influential in the piece becoming a guitar standard, even though it was originally written for piano.

An acoustic instrumental demo of "Malagueña" was performed by Ritchie Valens and recorded in early 1959 at his manager Bob Keane's home studio. It was to have been worked on and completed later that year, but Valens died in a plane crash on February 3 before anything further could be done. About two years later, Keane chose Valens' demo as one of several unfinished tracks featured on the album Ritchie Valens in Concert at Pacoima Jr. High. Other artists as varied as Chet Atkins, Count Basie, Roy Clark, Ray Conniff, Xavier Cugat, Esquivel, Connie Francis, Ted Heath and Chico O'Farrill have also performed the piece.

== Other popular versions ==
Another version in the pop music scene is that of Puerto Rican guitarist José Feliciano as part of his 1969 gold record Alive Alive O!. He performed his particular arrangement live many times over the decades. American guitarist Roy Clark recorded an instrumental version of "Malagueña" and also performed the song in an episode of the US television show The Odd Couple. Clark went on to close his shows with the song on a 12-string acoustic guitar for many years afterward.

In 1964, the Minneapolis group The Trashmen released a surf rock style rendition of the song on their Surfin' Bird album.

In 1973, Hans Vermeulen, leader of Dutch pop band Sandy Coast, produced a version by Los Angeles, which made it to the top three of the Dutch charts.

The piece has become a favorite in the sport of figure skating, used notably by US pair skaters, Gillian Wachsman and Todd Waggoner in their 1988 season long program. Their innovative choreography gave them a 5th place finish in the 1988 Calgary Winter Olympics and 4th place at the 1988 World Championships. It was also used by Kristi Yamaguchi for her gold medal-winning program at the 1992 Winter Olympics and World Championships, and more recently by world champion Javier Fernández, who used the piece for his short program during the 2015–16 and 2016–17 seasons. The score for the program consisted of an instrumental solo guitar section performed by Paco de Lucía and a vocal section by Plácido Domingo. The program was choreographed by Antonio Najarro, director of Spain's National Ballet. Pair figure skaters Aleksandra Boikova and Dmitrii Kozlovskii also used the piece as their free program music for the 2021-2022 Olympic season. In the 2023-24 season, Ilia Malinin skated to the piece in his short program.

The melody from bar 70 of the original "Malagueña" piano arrangement by Lecuona appears as a guitar solo in the opening lines of Shirley Bassey's 1967 version of "If You Go Away" from her album And We Were Lovers.

== Drum corps, marching band ==
"Malagueña" is often performed in drum and bugle corps and marching competitions. The song has been performed and recorded numerous times by both the University of Massachusetts Minuteman Marching Band and the University of Minnesota Marching Band and, as such, has become one of the songs most identified with both groups. One of the most memorable drum and bugle corps performances was by the Madison Scouts Drum and Bugle Corps in 1988, which earned them the Drum Corps International (DCI) championship title (the group played the song other years, as well, both before and after 1988). A non-jazz arrangement was played by another top drum and bugle corps in 1988, the Velvet Knights of Anaheim, California, which has continued to be a fan favorite.
