= "Mala Femmena" and Connie's Big Hits from Italy =

Studio album by Connie Francis
- Released: 1963
- Label: MGM

Connie Francis chronology
Greatest American Waltzes (1963)	"Mala Femmena" and Connie's Big Hits from Italy (1963)	In the Summer of His Years (1963)

"Mala Femmena" and Connie's Big Hits from Italy is an album by American singer Connie Francis, released in 1963 by MGM Records.

== Content ==
The album included several Italian songs and several Italian-language versions of American songs (e.g. of Connie Francis's hit "Where the Boys Are").

== Critical reception ==
Professional ratings
Review scores
Source	Rating
Billboard	positive

Billboard reviewed the album in its issue from September 14, 1963, writing: "Connie has come up with another fine album here. [...] The quality of performance is up to the high standards she has set for herself in the past. Keyed to hit a solid international audience."

== Chart performance ==
The album peaked at number 70 on Billboard's Top LPs chart in December 1963.

== Track listing ==
LP

Side 1
No.	Title	Length
1.	"Mala femmena"	2:35
2.	"La Paloma" ("Your Love")	2:35
3.	"Luna caprese"	3:02
4.	"Un violino nel mio cuor" ("A Violin in My Heart")	3:15
5.	"Violino tsigano" ("Gypsy Violin")	2:30
6.	"Tango della gelosia" ("Jealous of You")	2:25

Side 2
No.	Title	Length
1.	"C'e qualcuno" ("Where the Boys Are")	2:30
2.	"Che bella notte!" ("Tonight's My Night")	2:32
3.	"Portami con te" ("Fly Me to the Moon")	2:43
4.	"Un desiderio folle" ("Don't Break the Heart That Loves You")	2:50
5.	"Italian Lullaby"	3:27
6.	"Nessuno e' solo" ("No One Is Alone")	2:43

== Charts ==
Chart (1963)	Peak position
US Billboard Top LPs	70
