= Jealous of You (Tango della Gelosia) =

Single by Connie Francis

from the album More Greatest Hits
- B-side: "Everybody's Somebody's Fool"
- Released: April 1960
- Genre: Easy listening
- Length: 2:25
- Label: MGM; 12899
- Songwriter(s): Vittorio Mascheroni, Peppino Mendes, Marjorie Harper

Connie Francis singles chronology
"Mama" (February 1960)	"Jealous of You (Tango della Gelosia)" (1960)	"My Heart Has a Mind of Its Own" (August 1960)

"Jealous of You (Tango della Gelosia)" is a song written by Vittorio Mascheroni, Peppino Mendes, and Marjorie Harper and performed by Connie Francis. In 1960, the track reached No. 19 on the Billboard Hot 100.

It was featured on her 1961 album, More Greatest Hits.
