= Connie Francis Sings Fun Songs for Children =

1959 Children's album by Connie Francis

Connie Francis sings Fun Songs For Children

Studio album by Connie Francis
- Released: November 1959 & March 1962
- Recorded: September 21 and 22, 1959
- Genre: Pop
- Length: 23:28
- Label: 1959: Lion Records; L 70126; 1962: MGM Records; E-4023
- Producer: Arnold Maxin

Connie Francis chronology
Country & Western - Golden Hits (1959)	Connie Francis sings Fun Songs For Children (1959)	One for the Boys (1960)

Connie Francis sings Fun Songs For Children is a studio album of children's songs recorded by American pop singer Connie Francis. It is one of the few U. S. albums by Connie Francis to be released exclusively in mono. All songs were co-written by George Goehring who had provided Francis earlier that year with one of her biggest hits, Lipstick On Your Collar.

== Release ==
The album was originally released in November 1959 under the Catalogue number L 70126 on Lion Records, a subsidiary of Francis' label MGM Records. In March 1962 it was reassigned to MGM Records and given the catalog number E-4023. The album was subsequently released as a regular MGM Records Album with a newly designed cover.

In Britain, Francis' label distributor EMI gave the album an immediate release on the MGM label, catalog number MGM C 819, faithfully reproducing the Lion Records artwork.

== Track listing ==
=== Side A ===
#	Title	Songwriter	Length
1.	"Buster the Butterfly"	George Goehring, Walter Mack, Vin Roddie	1.46
2.	"Chester the Chimpanzee"	George Goehring, Walter Mack, Vin Roddie	1.31
3.	"Dinah the Dinosaur"	George Goehring, Walter Mack, Vin Roddie	2.18
4.	"Elmer the Elephant"	George Goehring, Walter Mack, Vin Roddie	1.58
5.	"Gertrude the Goldfish"	George Goehring, Walter Mack, Vin Roddie	1.46
6.	"Harold the Hippo"	George Goehring, Walter Mack, Vin Roddie	2.15

=== Side B ===
#	Title	Songwriter	Length
1.	"Kitty the Kangaroo"	George Goehring, Walter Mack, Vin Roddie	1.39
2.	"Nancy the Nightingale"	George Goehring, Walter Mack, Vin Roddie	2.03
3.	"Oscar the Octopus"	George Goehring, Walter Mack, Vin Roddie	1.47
4.	"Pinky the Penguin"	George Goehring, Walter Mack, Vin Roddie	2.13
5.	"Reggie the Rooster"	George Goehring, Walter Mack, Vin Roddie	2.02
6.	"Sammy the Silkworm"	George Goehring, Walter Mack, Vin Roddie	2.10
