= My Treasure (Connie Francis song) =

Single by Connie Francis
- B-side: "Are You Satisfied?"
- Released: 1955
- Genre: Pop, country
- Label: MGM

Connie Francis US singles chronology
| "(Oh Please) Make Him Jealous" / "Goody Goodbye" (1955) | "My Treasure" (1955) | "My First Real Love" / "Believe in Me (Credimi)" (1956) |

Audio
- "Freddy" on YouTube

"My Treasure" is a song written by Cy Coben and Bill Templeton and originally recorded by Connie Francis.

== Release ==
Connie Francis released the song as a single (MGM 12122, c/w "Are You Satisfied?") in late 1955.

Soon, The Hilltoppers released their version.

== Critical reception ==
Professional ratings
Review scores
| Source | Rating |
|---|---|
| Billboard | 80/100 |

The Hilltoppers' version
Review scores
| Source | Rating |
|---|---|
| Billboard | 80/100 |

Billboard reviewed Connie Francis's single on November 19, 1955, rating the "My Treasure" side 80 on a scale of 100 (which indicated "excellent" commercial potential) and writing: "Ditty with a country flavor was showcased strongly on a week-long soap opera and could have stirred considerable demand. Connie Francis warbles it (multi-dub) with fresh youthfulness."

On December 10, the magazine reviewed the Hilltoppers' version (Dot 15437, c/w "The Last word in Love"), rating it 80 as well. The review read: "Jimmy Sacca delivers a hearthelt vocal with an able backing from the group [...]. It's a slick job thruout [...]."

== Charts ==
Connie Francis version

| Chart (1955–1956) | Peak position |
|---|---|
| US Cash Box Best-Selling Singles | 37 |
| US Music Vendor | 38 |
