= Christmas in My Heart (Connie Francis album) =

1959 studio album by Connie Francis

Studio album by Connie Francis
- Released: November 1959
- Recorded: August 23, 26, and 27, 1959
- Genre: Christmas music
- Length: 42:05
- Label: MGM; E-3792 (mono)/SE-3792 (stereo)
- Producer: Arnold Maxin

Connie Francis chronology
Connie Francis Sings Italian Favorites (1959)	Christmas in My Heart (1959)	Connie's Greatest Hits (1959)

Connie's Christmas

Studio album by Connie Francis
- Released: October 1966
- Recorded: August 23, 26, and 27, 1959
- Genre: Christmas music
- Length: 42:05
- Label: MGM; E-4399 (mono)/SE-4399 (stereo)
- Producer: Arnold Maxin

Connie Francis chronology
Movie Greats Of The 60s (1966)	Connie's Christmas (1966)	Connie Francis live at The Sahara in Las Vegas (1966)

Christmas in My Heart is a studio album of Christmas music recorded by Connie Francis. The album features popular songs of the season on the A-side and the sacred music of Christmas on the B-side. It was re-released as Connie's Christmas in 1966.

== Background ==
Christmas in My Heart was recorded in August 1959 at EMI's Abbey Road Studios, then called EMI Recording Studios in London under the musical direction of Geoff Love and was released in November 1959.

The album was repackaged with a new cover design and re-released in October 1962. The album charted for 3 weeks peaking at No. 19 on Billboard's Christmas Records album chart on December 21, 1963.

Another repackaging and re-release followed in November 1966; this time the album was also retitled Connie's Christmas and received a new catalogue number: E-4399 for mono pressings and SE-4399 for stereo pressings. A compact disc edition of the album was issued by Polydor Records in 1988, with "Baby's First Christmas" (the B-side to Francis' 1961 single "When the Boy in Your Arms (Is the Boy in Your Heart)") added as a bonus track.

== Track listing ==
=== Side A ===
No.	Title	Writer(s)	Length
1.	"White Christmas"	Irving Berlin	3:24
2.	"Winter Wonderland"	Felix Bernard / Richard B. Smith	2:41
3.	"The Christmas Song"	Mel Tormé / Robert Wells	3:23
4.	"I'll Be Home for Christmas"	Kim Gannon / Walter Kent / Buck Ram	3:35
5.	"The Twelve Days of Christmas"	Traditional	5:18
6.	"Have Yourself a Merry Little Christmas"	Ralph Blane / Hugh Martin	4:30

=== Side B ===
No.	Title	Writer(s)	Length
7.	"Adeste Fidelis (O Come All Ye Faithful)"	John Francis Wade	3:06
8.	"The Lord's Prayer"	Albert Hay Malotte	2:56
9.	"Silent Night! Holy Night!"	Franz Gruber / Joseph Mohr	3:52
10.	"O Little Town of Bethlehem"	Phillips Brooks / Lewis Redner	2:57
11.	"The First Noël"	Traditional	3:10
12.	"Ave Maria"	Charles Gounod / Johann Sebastian Bach / Traditional	2:50
