= Greatest American Waltzes =

Studio album by Connie Francis
- Released: July 1963
- Recorded: June 18 and 19, 1963
- Genre: Pop
- Length: 31:08
- Labels: MGM; E-4145 (mono)/SE-4145 (stereo)
- Producer: Danny Davis

Connie Francis chronology
Follow the Boys (1963)	Greatest American Waltzes (1963)	"Mala Femmena" and Connie's Big Hits from Italy (1963)

Greatest American Waltzes is a studio album recorded by American entertainer Connie Francis.

== Overview ==
An album containing waltzes popular in the US had already been planned in 1961 but had been abandoned in favor of other album projects. A second attempt was made in 1963 and was recorded on June 18 and 19 that year at Owen Bradley's studio Bradley Film & Recording in Nashville. Arrangements were provided by Bill McElhiney who also conducted the sessions. Background vocals came from Millie Kirkham and The Jordanaires.

Greatest American Waltzes successfully reached the US album charts in late 1963. The album debuted on Billboard magazine's Top LP's chart in the issue dated October 5, 1963, peaking at No. 94 during a seventeen-week run on the chart. It entered the Cashbox magazine's Top 100 Albums chart in the issue dated October 5, 1963, peaking at No. 79 during a fourteen-week run on the chart.

== Track listing ==
=== Side A ===
No.	Title	Writer(s)	Length
1.	"Anniversary Waltz"	Dave Franklin, Al Dubin	2:27
2.	"Remember"	Irving Berlin	2:24
3.	"My Buddy"	Walter Donaldson, Gus Kahn	2:51
4.	"You Can't Be True, Dear"	Hans Otten, Gerhard Ebeler, Hal Cotten	2:35
5.	"Always"	Irving Berlin	2:21
6.	"Beautiful Ohio"	Ballard MacDonald, Robert A. King	2:44

=== Side B ===
No.	Title	Writer(s)	Length
1.	"Three O'clock In The Morning"	Theodora Morse, Julián Robledo	2:15
2.	"True Love"	Cole Porter	3:14
3.	"Till We Meet Again"	Richard A. Whiting, Raymond B. Egan	2:42
4.	"Melody Of Love"	Hans Engelmann, Tom Glazer	2:21
5.	"Fascination"	Fermo Dante Marchetti, Maurice de Féraudy, Dick Manning	2:46
6.	"(I'll Be with You) In Apple Blossom Time"	Albert Von Tilzer, Neville Fleason	2:28
Total length:			31:08

== Charts ==
Chart peaks for Greatest American Waltzes
Chart (1963)	Peak position
US Billboard Top LPs	94
US Cashbox Top 100 Albums	79
US Cashbox Top 50 Stereo	39
