= Valentino (Connie Francis song) =

Single by Connie Francis
- Released: 1960
- Genre: Pop
- Label: MGM

Audio
- "Valentino" on YouTube

"Valentino" is a song written by Kadish Millet and originally recorded by Connie Francis.

It wasn't issued as a single in the United States, but reached No. 27 in the UK, where it was coupled with "It Would Be Worth It" on MGM 1060.

== Lyrics ==
In this song, Connie Francis "sermonis[es] a 'hood' (Teddy-boy) named Valentino".

== Covers ==
The song was covered in many European languages.

== Charts ==
Chart (1960)	Peak position
Belgium (Ultratop 50 Flanders)	8
Belgium (Ultratop 50 Wallonia)	1
UK Singles (Official Charts)	27
