= Bixio Cherubini =

Italian lyricist, playwright and poet

- Born: 27 March 1899; Leonessa, Italy
- Died: 14 December 1987 (aged 88); Milan, Italy
- Occupation: Lyricist

Bixio Cherubini (27 March 1899 – 14 December 1987) was an Italian lyricist, playwright and poet.

== Life and career ==
Born in Leonessa, Cherubini was a descendant of composer Luigi Cherubini. He started composing poems and lyrics during the World War I, in which he enlisted as a volunteer. After working several years in Rome as a Poste italiane employee, in 1927, he moved to Milan to focus on songwriting. Around this time, he formed a successful professional relationship with Cesare Andrea Bixio, with whom he wrote classics such as "Tango delle capinere", "La canzone dell'amore", "Violino tzigano", "Trotta cavallino", "Mamma".

During World War II, Cherubini was active as a partisan with the Val Malchirolo brigade. After the war, while sporadically working with Bixio and other composers, he started a long and fruitful professional association with Carlo Concina, with whom he composed dozens of hits including "Vola colomba", the winning song of the second edition of the Sanremo Music Festival, "Campanaro", "Marieta monta in gondola", "Campane di Santa Lucia".

Bixio was also active as a playwright, specialised in revues.
