= Fallin' (Connie Francis song) =

Single by Connie Francis
- B-side: "Happy Days and Lonely Nights"
- Released: 1958
- Recorded: 2 September 1958
- Genre: Rock and roll
- Length: 2:12
- Label: MGM Records K 12713
- Songwriter: Neil Sedaka/Howard Greenfield
- Producer: Morty Kraft

Connie Francis US singles chronology
"Stupid Cupid" (1958)	"Fallin'" / "Happy Days and Lonely Nights" (1958)	"My Happiness" / "Never Before" (1958)

"Fallin'" is a song written by Neil Sedaka and Howard Greenfield, that was recorded by Connie Francis on 2 September 1958 at Metropolitan Studio (NYC) in a session produced by Morton "Morty" Kraft who also conducted.

== Background ==
The same team had been responsible for Francis' precedent single "Stupid Cupid" which had returned Francis to the Top 20 after the disappointing #36 peak of "I'm Sorry I Made You Cry" the follow-up to her breakout hit "Who's Sorry Now?". Francis recalls Bobby Darin telling her "on 'Stupid Cupid' you were yourself – now [on "Fallin'"] you're imitating me and it's not going to make it big. It's not a Top Ten hit." Francis adds: "And the lyrics were too sexy for then."

== Chart performance ==
"Fallin'" was an upbeat rock and roll song in the same vein as "Stupid Cupid" but failed to approach its success peaking at #30. The B-side of "Fallin'" was "Happy Days and Lonely Nights", a signature song of torch song legend Ruth Etting. Francis' version received enough airplay to reach #88 on the Cash Box Best Selling Singles chart.

In the UK, "Fallin'" was released with a different standard: "I'll Get By" as the B-side with both tracks charting at #20 for "Fallin'" and #19 for "I'll Get By".

== Cover versions ==
- Wanda Jackson, who also recorded "Stupid Cupid", has recorded "Fallin'".
- The song's composer, Neil Sedaka, cut his own version for his 1959 debut album Rock With Sedaka; Sedaka's version served as B-side for his RCA Italiana single "All I Need Is You".

== Popular culture ==
- "Fallin'" can be heard in the 1996 film The Craft in which the Helen Shaver character uses the insurance windfall she receives after her abusive husband is dispatched by her daughter's witchcraft to purchase a jukebox stocked with Connie Francis singles. In 1999 Francis sued Universal Music Group – who by then held the MGM catalog – over "Fallin'"'s appearance in The Craft as well as the appearance of her songs in two other films (Postcards From America and Jawbreaker). The suit was dismissed.
- In 2008 "Fallin'" was used in the UK in a television commercial for Special K. In September, 2012, Target started using the song in a new commercial. The song was also used in the film Final Destination Bloodlines during the premonition scene.
