= Eighteen (Connie Francis song) =

Single by Connie Francis
- B-side: "Faded Orchid"
- Released: 1957
- Genre: Rock'n'roll, pop
- Label: MGM

Connie Francis US singles chronology
"No Other One" / "I Leaned on a Man" (1957)	"Eighteen" (1957)	"The Majesty of Love" / "You, My Darlin' You" (1957)

Audio
- "Eighteen" on YouTube

"Eighteen" is a song written by Bradford Boobis and Neil Nephew and originally recorded by Connie Francis for MGM Records.

== Release and critical reception ==
Professional ratings
Review scores
Source	Rating
Billboard	(favorable)

Billboard reviewed the single (MGM 12490, c/w "Faded Orchid") on June 3, 1957, writing: "The young chick comes of age here on two sides with not only a fine sound, but definitely superior material as well." Of the two sides, the reviewer thought that "Eighteen" had more commercial potential and described it as "an incessant theme" with "class thrushing pound out the money sound".

== Charts ==
Chart (1957)	Peak position
US Music Vendor	54
