= Rock 'n' Roll Million Sellers =

Studio album by Connie Francis
- Released: November 1959
- Recorded: April 15, 1959; September 8 – 9, 1959; September 25, 1959
- Genre: Rock and Roll
- Length: 29:15
- Label: MGM; E-3794(mono)/SE-3794 (stereo) Contour (Metro Records) 2870 383 (stereo)
- Producer: Ray Ellis

Connie Francis chronology
Connie's Greatest Hits (1959)	Rock 'n' Roll Million Sellers (1959)	Country & Western – Golden Hits (1959)

Singles from Rock 'n' Roll Million Sellers
- 1. "Lipstick on Your Collar" Released: May 1959

Professional ratings
Review scores
Source	Rating
Allmusic	4.5/5 stars

Rock 'n' Roll Million Sellers is a studio album recorded by American entertainer Connie Francis. It was issued on the Contour label (2870 383) as Connie Francis Sings the Million Sellers.

== Overview ==
The album is a tribute to the then-current rock 'n' roll-stars of the era, such as Elvis Presley and Fats Domino. The album's only original recording was "Lipstick on Your Collar", which became a number 5 hit for Francis on the US pop chart in 1959. It was her sixth studio album, and reached No. 12 in the UK and No. 47 on Cash Box.

== Charts ==
Chart (1959)	Peak position
US Cash Box	47
UK Albums Chart	12

== Track listing ==
=== Side A ===
#	Title	Songwriter	Length	Remark
1.	"Heartbreak Hotel"	Mae Boren Axton, Thomas Durden, Elvis Presley	2.05	-
2.	"Tweedlee Dee"	Winfield Scott	2.33	-
3.	"I Almost Lost My Mind"	Ivory Joe Hunter	2.39	-
4a.	"I Hear You Knockin'"	Dave Bartholomew, Pearl King	2.24	on stereo pressings only
4b.	"I Hear You Knockin'"	Dave Bartholomew, Pearl King	2.20	alternate take on mono pressings only
5.	"Just a Dream"	Jimmy Clanton	2.57	
6a.	"Don't Be Cruel"	Otis Blackwell, Elvis Presley	1.45	on stereo pressings only
6b.	"Don't Be Cruel"	Otis Blackwell, Elvis Presley	1.42	alternate take on mono pressings only

=== Side B ===
#	Title	Songwriter	Length	Remark
1.	"Lipstick on Your Collar"	George Goehring, Edna Lewis	2.20	-
2.	"Sincerely"	Harvey Fuqua, Alan Freed	2.54	-
3.	"Ain't That a Shame"	Fats Domino, Dave Bartholomew	2.15	-
4.	"Silhouettes"	Bob Crewe, Frank Slay	2.48	-
5.	"I'm Walkin'"	Fats Domino, Dave Bartholomew	2.02	-
6.	"It's Only Make Believe"	Conway Twitty, Jack Nance	2.33	-

=== Not included songs from the sessions ===
#	Title	Songwriter	Length	Remark
1.	"Earth Angel"	Curtis Williams, Jesse Belvin, Gaynel Hodge	3.12	unreleased until 1993
2.	"Frankie"	Neil Sedaka, Howard Greenfield	2.33	released on MGM Records Single K 12792 and eventually included on Connie's Greatest Hits
3.	"Oh, Frankie"	Ginger Lenny	2.25	unreleased until 1988
4.	"Plenty Good Lovin'"	Connie Francis	2.03	released on MGM Records Single K 12824 and eventually included on Connie's Greatest Hits
5.	"You're Gonna Miss Me"	Eddie Curtis	2.43	released on MGM Records Single K 12824 and eventually included on Connie's Greatest Hits
