= Country & Western – Golden Hits =

Studio album by Connie Francis
- Released: November 1959
- Recorded: July 9 – 11, 1959
- Genre: Country
- Length: 32:03
- Labels: MGM; E-3795 (mono)/SE-3795 (stereo)
- Producer: Ray Ellis

Connie Francis chronology
Rock 'n' Roll Million Sellers (1959)	Country & Western – Golden Hits (1959)	Connie Francis Sings Fun Songs for Children (1959)

Country & Western – Golden Hits is a studio album recorded and released in 1959 by U. S. entertainer Connie Francis.

The album is a tribute to the great Country music stars of the era, such as Hank Williams and Don Gibson.

The album was re-packaged with a new cover design and re-released in March 1962.

== Track listing ==
=== Side A ===
#	Title	Songwriter	Length	Remark
1.	"Singing The Blues"	Melvin Endsley	2.18	-
2.	"Tennessee Waltz"	Redd Stewart, Pee Wee King	2.55	-
3.	"Young Love"	Ric Cartey, Carole Joyner	2.37	-
4.	"Your Cheatin' Heart"	Hank Williams	2.23	-
5.	"Bye, Bye Love"	Felice Bryant, Boudleaux Bryant	2.25	-
6a.	"(There'll Be) Peace in the Valley (For Me)"	Thomas A. Dorsey	3.37	stereo pressings only
6b.	"(There'll Be) Peace in the Valley (For Me)"	Thomas A. Dorsey	2.52	edited version, on mono pressings only

=== Side B ===
#	Title	Songwriter	Length	Remark
1.	"My Special Angel"	Jimmy Duncan	2.54	-
2.	"Hearts of Stone"	Rudy Jackson	1.57	-
3.	"Half As Much"	Curley Williams	2.49	-
4.	"Cold, Cold Heart"	Hank Williams	2.44	-
5.	"Let Me Go, Lover"	Jenny Lou Carson, Al Hill	2.37	-
6.	"Anytime"	Herbert "Happy" Larson	2.47	-
