= Blue Winter (song) =

Single by Connie Francis
- B-side: "You Know You Don't Want Me (So Why Don't You Leave Me Alone)"
- Released: February 1964
- Genre: Pop rock
- Length: 2:23
- Label: MGM; 13214
- Songwriters: Ben Raleigh, John Gluck

Connie Francis singles chronology
"In the Summer of His Years" (1963)	"Blue Winter" (1964)	"Be Anything (but Be Mine)" (1964)

"Blue Winter" is a song written by Ben Raleigh and John Gluck and performed by Connie Francis. In 1964, the track reached No. 7 on the U.S. adult contemporary chart, No. 24 on the Billboard Hot 100, and No. 23 in Canada.
