= I'm Sorry I Made You Cry =

Tradition pop and jazz standard song published in 1916

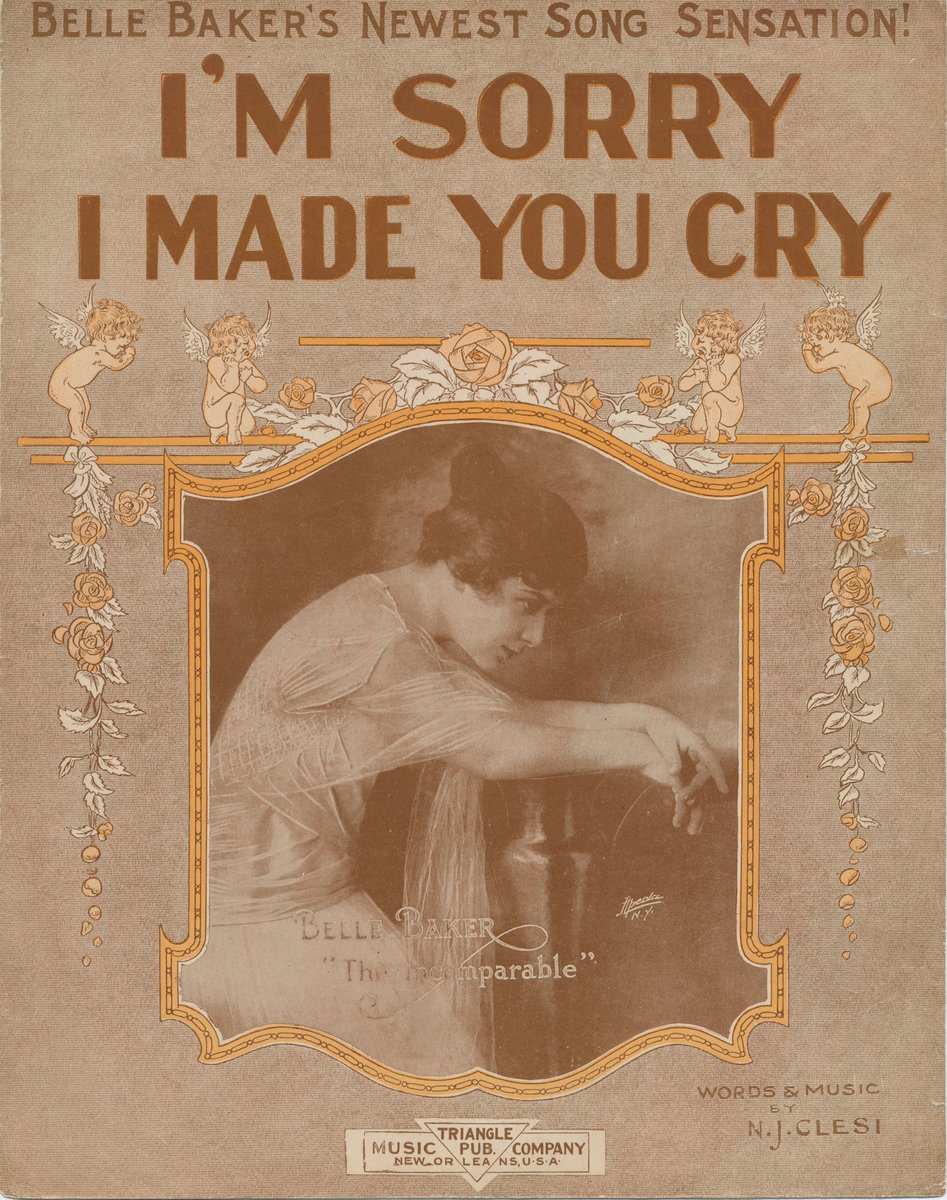
- Sheet music cover, 1916

Song
- Language: English
- Published: 1916
- Songwriter: N.J. Clesi

"I'm Sorry I Made You Cry"

Single by Connie Francis
- B-side: "Lock Up Your Heart"
- Released: April 1958
- Recorded: 1958
- Genre: Traditional pop
- Length: 2:23
- Label: MGM Records
- Songwriter: N.J. Clesi

Connie Francis singles chronology
"Who's Sorry Now" (1957)	"I'm Sorry I Made You Cry" (1958)	"Heartaches" (1958)

"I'm Sorry I Made You Cry" is a traditional pop and jazz standard song, written and composed by songwriter Nick .J. Clesi, first published by Triangle Music in New Orleans in 1916. It was republished for national audience in 1918 by Leo Feist, Inc. in New York City, with sheet music cover depicting a US World War I soldier embracing a woman. (This sheet music can be found at the Pritzker Military Museum & Library.)

== Notable recordings ==
- Henry Burr sung it as a waltz for Victor Records in 1918.
- Notable recordings by jazz groups include versions by Earl Fuller, Wilbur Sweatman, Eddie Condon, Fats Waller, and Miff Mole. Frank Sinatra recorded it as a sweet ballad in 1947.
- Connie Francis brought it back to the pop chart with a version in 1958. (#27 CAN)
- Jimmy Roselli included the song on his album Saloon Songs Vol. 2, in the 1960s.

== Usage in film ==
- Alice Faye sang it in Rose of Washington Square (1939).
