= Jamais (song) =

- Canadian release

Single by Connie Francis

from the EP Connie Francis In Paris
- B-side: Lily Marlène; Celui Que Je Veux (Someone Else's Boy)
- Released: 1961; 65 years ago
- Recorded: June 1961
- Genre: Pop music
- Length: 1:51
- Label: MGM Records SPF-1092; LSF-51X
- Songwriters: Sebastián Yradier, Hubert Ithier

Jamais is a French single recorded by U.S. entertainer Connie Francis. The song is a French reworking of Sebastián Yradier's classic tale about a white dove, "La Paloma", a song which Francis also recorded in

- English (as Your Love)
- Italian (as La Paloma)
- Neapolitan (as La Paloma)
- Portuguese (as La Paloma)
- Spanish (as La Paloma, sometimes also credited as Tú Amor)

The B-side of "Jamais" was "Lily Marlène", a French cover version of Lale Andersen's wartime classic Lili Marleen. In Canada, the B-side was instead the french recording of her 1961 song "Someone Else's Boy". All of these songs plus "La Seule Qui T'aime" ("Pretty Little Baby"), were featured in her 1961 extended play Connie Francis In Paris, released in Belgium and France. Cashbox magazine called "Jamais" a highlight on the "sensational EP".

== Commercial performance ==
"Jamais" became a Top Ten single for Francis in Canada and France. In Canada, Quebec City deejay St. Jean Cote first got hold of one of the original French records of the song from France, and began playing it on his radio station. Demand quickly surged for the song, and by May 1962 almost 2500 copies were ordered. The recording became popular among the French-speaking areas in the country, as well as in English-speaking areas, and was listed among the best-selling singles in the country in 1962. Francis had a total of five singles on the ranking. The single was such a success, that an album was prepared to be released, with seven French songs and five Italian ones.
