= My Heart Has a Mind of Its Own =

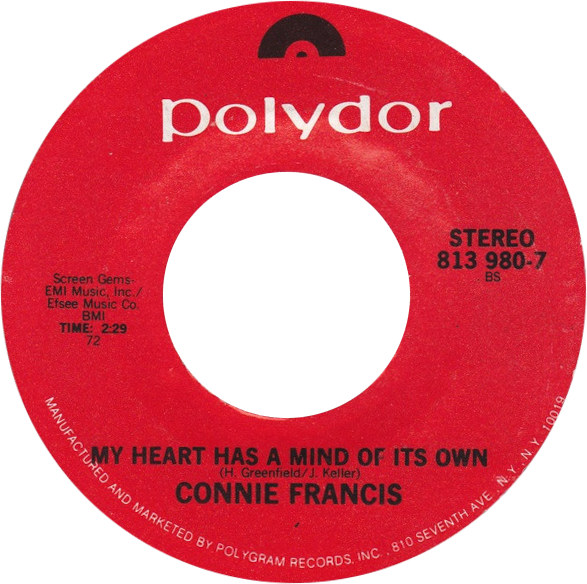
- One of US re-releases

Single by Connie Francis

from the album More Greatest Hits
- B-side: "Malagueña"
- Released: 1960
- Recorded: 1960
- Genre: Country; pop; easy listening
- Length: 2:30
- Label: MGM
- Songwriters: Jack Keller; Howard Greenfield

Connie Francis singles chronology
"Everybody's Somebody's Fool" / "Jealous of You (Tango della Gelosia)" (1960)	"My Heart Has a Mind of Its Own" / "Malagueña" (1960)	"Many Tears Ago" / "Senza Mamma e Nnammurata" (1960)

"My Heart Has a Mind of Its Own" is a song written by Howard Greenfield and Jack Keller which was a No. 1 hit for Connie Francis in 1960.

== Connie Francis recording ==
Francis recorded "My Heart Has a Mind of Its Own" at Radio Recorders studio in Hollywood over three different sessions on July 9, 25, and 31, 1960 with Jesse Kaye and Arnold Maxin acting as producers; Gus Levene arranged the orchestration and conducted. Jack Keller brought one of the LA tapes back to New York for a Sax & Guitar overdub at Olmstead Studios. Artie Kaplan and Al Gorgoni were brought in for the sax and guitar overdub.

Several takes from these sessions are still extant. The original MGM K 12923 single utilized Take 49 (recorded July 31, 1960) but two weeks into release this was replaced by Take 37 (recorded July 25, 1960) at the behest of Francis and the song's writers.

"My Heart Has a Mind of Its Own" became Francis' second consecutive A-side to top the Billboard Hot 100 reaching No. 1 on the chart dated 26 September 1960 and holding there the following week. The single also marked Francis' final appearance of the R&B charts at No. 11.

In the UK "My Heart Has a Mind of Its Own" reached No. 3.

=== Charts ===
==== Weekly charts ====
Chart (1960)	Position
Canada (CHUM Hit Parade)	3
UK Singles (Official Charts)	3
US Billboard Hot 100	1
US Hot R&B/Hip-Hop Songs (Billboard)	11

==== All-time charts ====
Chart (1958-2018)	Position
US Billboard Hot 100	383

=== Mein Herz weiß genau, was es will ===
Francis recorded German versions of her US hits such as Everybody's Somebody's Fool (entitled "Die Liebe ist ein seltsames Spiel"). On 18 October 1960, Francis recorded a German-language version of "My Heart Has a Mind of Its Own" ("Mein Herz weiß genau, was es will" which translates to My heart knows exactly what it wants), with German lyrics by Ralph Maria Siegel. It was recorded at the tail end of the same session which produced Francis' subsequent U.S. hits "Where the Boys Are", "Breakin' in a Brand New Broken Heart".

"Mein Herz weiß genau, was es will", however, remain unreleased until 1988 when it appeared for the first time ever on anthology of Francis' complete German, Dutch and Swedish recordings.

"My Heart Has a Mind of Its Own" was subsequently provided with an alternate set of German lyrics – also by Ralph Maria Siegel - entitled "So wie es damals war" (which translates to "Just like it was before") and recorded by Siw Malmkvist as well as Trixie Kühn, Gina Dobra, Nana Gualdi, and Charlotte Marian. Neither version did chart.

== Cover versions ==
Unlike Francis' preceding No. 1 "Everybody's Somebody's Fool", "My Heart Has a Mind of Its Own" did not become a C&W crossover hit for Francis herself but the song was subsequently recorded by several high-profile C&W songstresses beginning with Connie Smith on her 1966 album Downtown Country. In 1971 Smith's version was included on a compilation release which was entitled My Heart Has a Mind of Its Own.

The most successful country version was by Susan Raye in 1972 which hit Billboard's Top 10 Country Singles. Debby Boone made a slightly less successful hit of it in 1979, peaking at No. 11; Boone subsequently made less successful bids for C&W chart success with remakes of the Connie Francis hits "Breakin' in a Brand New Broken Heart" (No. 25) and "Everybody's Somebody's Fool" (No. 48).

"My Heart Has a Mind of Its Own" was recorded by Reba McEntire early in her career; that version was first released on the 1994 compilation Oklahoma Girl. "My Heart Has a Mind of Its Own" was also one of several Pop classic hits covered by Sandy Posey on One Fine Day a 2005 CD release which marked Posey's return to her countrypolitan roots on which Francis' "Who's Sorry Now?" and "My Happiness" were also remade.

== See also ==
- List of Hot 100 number-one singles of 1960 (U.S.)
