= Carolina Moon (song) =

1928 hit by Gene Austin

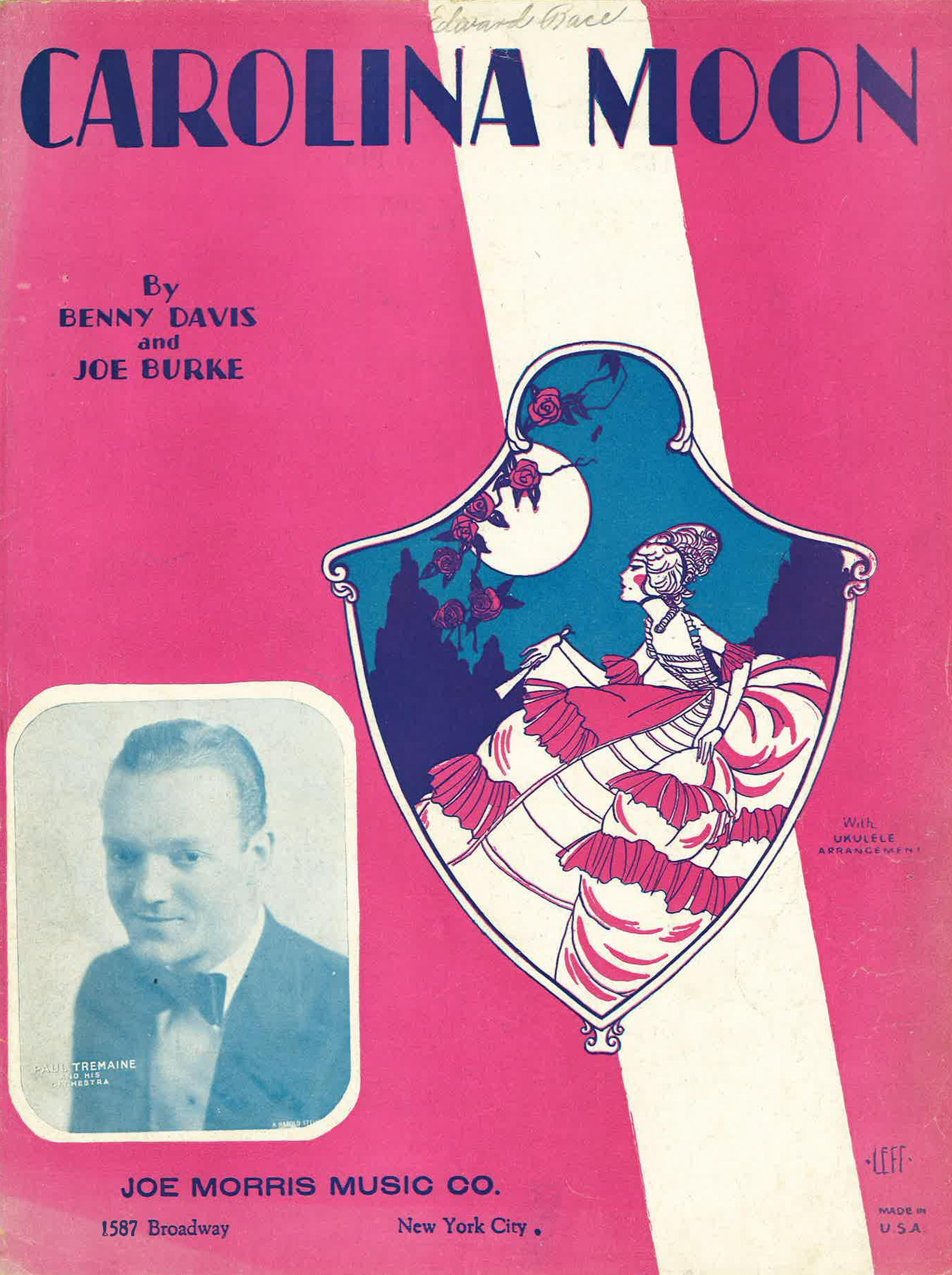
- Sheet music cover, 1928

Song by Gene Austin
- B-side: "I Wish I Had Died In My Cradle (Before I Grew Up To Love You)"
- Released: February 1929
- Recorded: December 10, 1928
- Studio: Victor Studios, New York City
- Genre: Jazz, Pop Vocal
- Label: Victor 21833
- Composer: Benny Davis
- Lyricist: Joe Burke

Gene Austin singles chronology
"Jeannine, I Dream of Lilac Time" (1928)	"Carolina Moon" (1929)	"A Garden in the Rain" (1929)

"Carolina Moon" is a popular song, written by Joe Burke and Benny Davis. Written in 1924, the song was first recorded in 1928 by American crooner Gene Austin whose version charted for 14 weeks, seven of them at #1. The song was copyrighted in 1928, so it entered the public domain on January 1, 2024. (Note: RI58253)

== Notable renditions ==
"Carolina Moon" was recorded by Connie Francis in June 1958. As with her breakthrough hit, "Who's Sorry Now?", "Carolina Moon" was recommended to Francis by her father. The B-side of Francis's international hit, "Stupid Cupid", "Carolina Moon" became a double A-side hit with "Stupid Cupid" and spent six weeks at the top of the UK Singles Chart in late 1958. Benny Davis would later write several songs for Connie Francis including the 1962 number-one hit "Don't Break the Heart That Loves You" (Joe Burke had died in 1950).

Maureen McGovern recorded "Carolina Moon" for her 1979 self-titled album release with the track serving as the B-side of her top 20 single "Different Worlds" – this version erroneously credits the song as being of "Traditional" composition.

The song has also been recorded by the Chordettes, Perry Como, Annette Hanshaw, Dean Martin, Jim Reeves, Ben Selvin, Kate Smith, Slim Whitman, and Thelonious Monk in a jazz instrumental version.

== The song ==
The song contains the memorable chorus:-

Oh, Carolina Moon keep shining.

shining on the one who waits for me.

Carolina Moon, I'm pining,

pining for the place I long to be.

It describes the feelings of parted lovers, connected by the knowledge that the same moon shines on them both.
