= Frankie (Connie Francis song) =

Single by Connie Francis
- A-side: "Lipstick on Your Collar"
- Released: May 1959
- Genre: Pop
- Length: 2:35
- Label: MGM
- Songwriters: Howard Greenfield, Neil Sedaka

Connie Francis singles chronology
"My Happiness" (1959)	"Frankie" (1959)	"You're Gonna Miss Me" / "Plenty Good Lovin'" (1959)

"Frankie" is a song written by Howard Greenfield and Neil Sedaka and performed by Connie Francis featuring the Ray Ellis Orchestra. It reached #9 on the U.S. pop chart and #17 on the U.S. R&B chart in 1959.

The song ranked #61 on Billboard magazine's Top 100 singles of 1959.

The B-side to Francis' version, "Lipstick on Your Collar", reached #3 in the U.K., #5 on the U.S. pop chart, and #10 on the U.S. R&B chart in 1959.
