= Borney Bergantine =

Borney Bergantine (October 3, 1909 – July 4, 1952) was the composer of "My Happiness," a music hit from the late 1940s that endures as an American love tune.

== Career ==
Bergantine was born October 3, 1909. His birth name, Biagio Bergantino, became Americanized over time, first to Barny, and finally to Borney Bergantine. He was the son of Italian immigrants Nicholas and Anna Bergantino who moved to Kansas City from New York City two years before he was born. Bergantine attended Central Business College and was a graduate of Manuel High School. He was active in Italian-American affairs as editor of The American Tribune, a newspaper devoted to the interests of that community.

Bergantine was blind in the right eye, the result of a play injury with a toy umbrella as a toddler. A fall in a tree while in Italy as a boy caused one of his legs not to thrive. The limp that developed was offset by a cane which Bergantine came to rely on to get around. He was married in 1935.

Bergantine was granted membership into ASCAP, the American Society of Composers and Publishers. Bergantine’s songwriting included other original works such as "Why Am I Losing You" and "Forever With You." These were recorded following the success of "My Happiness." Bergantine also collaborated locally to write "Watch Your Step," which became a national safety song.

Bergantine died July 4, 1952, at the age of 42. He was a lifelong Kansas City resident except for six years in Italy as a youngster. His last home, shared with his wife, Vita, and their two children, Patty and Billy, was at 4234 Grand Avenue North. "My Happiness," was played at Bergantine’s funeral.

== "My Happiness" ==
Bergantine was orchestra leader of "The Happiness Boys", a Kansas City band of the 1930s. This was the time of the Great Depression. "My Happiness" was played by "The Happiness Boys" wherever they performed. It was several years before the song itself, which Bergantine wrote about 1931, was recorded on an independent label. "My Happiness" was selected for the flip side of a record for a hit song. It was recorded by Jon and Sondra Steele on Damon Records and released in January 1948. Bergantine shared musical credits with Betty Peterson. He was credited for melody. Peterson, the wife of music publisher Louis Blasco, was credited for lyrics. The flip side, which was "My Happiness," was the side people wanted to hear. The listening public fell in love with it. "My Happiness" swept the record stores. It became a top song, winding up No. 2 on the charts.

"My Happiness" also has the fame of being the first song Elvis Presley ever recorded. Presley recorded the then five-year-old song at Sun Studios in Memphis on July 18, 1953—a year after Bergantine's death. Elvis's Sun recordings, made over a three-year period beginning with "My Happiness," were inducted into the US Congress National Recording Registry in 2002.

Jon & Sondra Steele who recorded the first version remade the song in 1970 and it was produced by Paul Marshall, a former member of the psychedelic band of the 60s-the Strawberry Alarm Clock. The first cover was by the Pied Pipers which featured Jo Stafford.

Connie Francis successfully recorded "My Happiness" for MGM in 1959. "My Happiness" has been sung by many other artists including Ella Fitzgerald, Jim Reeves, Frank Sinatra, Andy Williams and Pat Boone.
