= Where the Boys Are (song) =

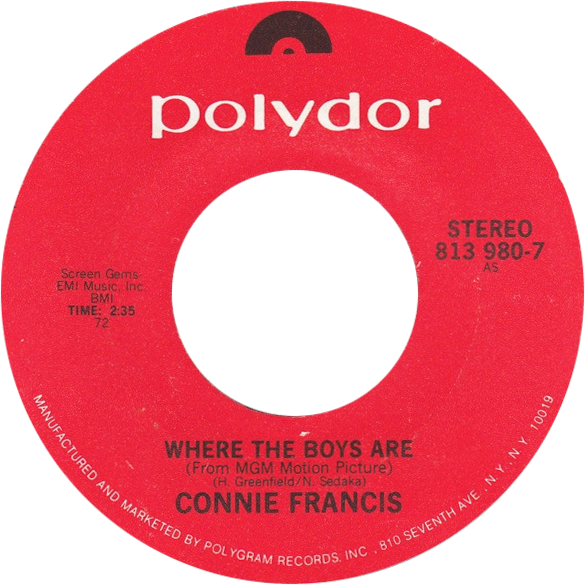
- One of US reissues

Single by Connie Francis
- B-side: "No One," "Baby Roo"
- Released: January 1961
- Recorded: October 18, 1960 (A-side); December 27, 1960 (B-side)
- Genre: Traditional pop
- Length: 2:43 (A-side); 2:48 (B-side)
- Label: MGM K 12971
- Songwriters: Neil Sedaka, Howard Greenfield
- Producer: Jesse Kaye

Connie Francis US singles chronology
"Many Tears Ago" / "Senza Mamma e Nnammurata" (1960)	"Where the Boys Are" (1961)	"Breakin' in a Brand New Broken Heart" / "Someone Else's Boy" (1961)

"Where the Boys Are" is a song written by Neil Sedaka and Howard Greenfield. It was written for and first recorded by Connie Francis, as the title track of the 1960 film of the same name in which she co-starred.

== Original version ==
=== Premise ===
Francis recorded "Where the Boys Are" as the theme song for the motion picture Where the Boys Are, a 1960 MGM release in which Francis made her movie acting debut as one of four female students on spring break in Fort Lauderdale.

According to Francis, she was on location in Fort Lauderdale when the film's producer, Joe Pasternak, advised her that he had commissioned the Oscar-winning songwriting team of Sammy Cahn and Jimmy Van Heusen to write a theme song for the movie which Francis would sing. Pasternak later recalled that when, at Francis's insistence, he agreed to consider a submission from the Sedaka-Greenfield songwriting team to follow their song "Stupid Cupid", he told her, "They've got a week but it's got to be here by Wednesday: that's when we're picking the song." Francis thereupon telephoned Greenfield in New York City, and he agreed to complete a "Where the Boys Are" theme song with Sedaka. However, she recalled that Greenfield initially reacted unfavorably to the request, later saying, "'Where the Boys Are'? What kind of stupid title is that? Who can write a song with a title like 'Where the Boys Are'?" Despite his misgivings, he and Sedaka in fact completed two "Where the Boys Are" theme songs, and in order to meet Pasternak's deadline, the demos of Sedaka singing both songs were delivered by an airline hostess who personally knew Francis and was working a flight to Florida.

Sedaka and Greenfield had indicated to Francis that they both much preferred one of their two proposed "Where the Boys Are" theme songs over the other and Francis concurred. Of this, Francis later said, "One of the versions we loved and the other we [three] all hated. Joe Pasternak came to me after [the Wednesday] meeting with the decision. 'You're right, Connie,' he said: 'This is the [right] song.' And it was the version the three of us hated."

An alternate scenario for Pasternak's vetting of the two Sedaka-Greenfield bids indicates that the producer witnessed a live performance of Francis performing both versions of the song to Sedaka's piano accompaniment. According to this scenario, the rejected version of the "Where the Boys Are" theme song was never recorded even as a demo.

Neil Sedaka has stated that "Where the Boys Are" is the only one of his 700 plus compositions not written with any intent of his singing it himself: (Sedaka quote:) "People think I wrote [a lot of] songs for others, but the truth is I wrote them all for me to record. Other people then picked them up and recorded them themselves." Sedaka did perform the song in concert, however, notably for his live album "The Show Goes On" recorded at the Royal Albert Hall.

=== Motion picture version ===
The version chosen by Joe Pasternak was recorded for the first time on July 12, 1960, in Hollywood and was only used when combined to medleys with the overture and closing credits scores written by George E. Stoll.

=== Original released version (1960) ===
Francis recorded the single version of Where the Boys Are on 18 October 1960 in a New York City recording session with Stan Applebaum arranging and conducting. The same session also came up with Francis' hits "Many Tears Ago" and "Breakin' in a Brand New Broken Heart" as well as the songs "On the Outside Looking In", "Happy New Year Baby", and "Mein Herz weiß genau, was es will", which all would remain unreleased until the 1980s.

Subsequently, Francis recorded "Where the Boys Are" in six other languages on November 9, 1960:

- German (as Wenn ich träume)
- French (as Je sais qu'un gars)
- Italian (as Qualcuno mi aspetta)
- Japanese (as Atashi-no)
- Neapolitan (as C'è qualcuno)
- Spanish (as Donde hay chicos)

The German and French singles of the respective translations of "Where the Boys Are" would feature as B-side a translated version of "No One," the flip of the English-language single: the German rendering of "No One" was entitled "Niemand", the French was "Personne". (Francis also recorded renderings of "No One" in Italian: as "Mai nessuno", and Japanese: "Mada".)

The various versions of "Where the Boys Are" would afford Francis a No. 1 hit in some fifteen countries. The Japanese version Atashi-no was even released in the US on MGM Records Single K 13005.

Where the Boys Are was comparatively less successful in the English speaking world: in the US, the song peaked at No. 4 while the track peaked on both the UK and Australian charts at No. 5. However, Where the Boys Are became Francis' signature tune and remains a fan favorite.

==== Charts ====
Chart (1961)	Peak position
Australia (Kent Music Report)	5
Canada (CHUM Chart)	7
Italy (Musica e dischi)	2
Ireland (The Herald)	6
New Zealand (Listener)	4
New Zealand (RIANZ)	1
Philippines	4
UK Singles (Official Charts)	5
US Billboard Hot 100	4
US Cashbox Top 100 Singles	4
US Record World	2

=== Re-recordings ===
After several years of stage absence, Francis recorded a new album entitled Who's Happy Now? in 1978. A revamped Disco version of Where the Boys Are was chosen as the leading track of the album and issued as a single. Although the English recording wasn't able to crack the charts anywhere, Francis also recorded Spanish, Italian and Japanese Disco versions of the song.

Francis would again re-record "Where the Boys Are", the song being one of seventeen of her hits remade for her 1989 album Where the Hits Are a Roger Hawkins production recorded for Malaco Records at Muscle Shoals Sound Studios.

== Cover versions ==
- The duo Get Wet: comprising pianist Zecca Esquibel and vocalist Sherri Beachfront (née Lewis), recorded "Where the Boys Are" for their 1981 self-titled debut - produced by Phil Ramone - from which it was issued as the follow-up to the Top 40 hit "Just So Lonely".
- Lisa Hartman recorded "Where the Boys Are" for the soundtrack of the film's 1984 remake of the same name. Issued as a single in April 1984 - concurrently with the film - the track would be included on the 2011 CD reissue of Hartman's 1982 album Letterock.
- Lorna Luft, who co-starred in Where the Boys Are '84, recorded a disco version of "Where the Boys Are" released concurrently with the film although it was not a soundtrack item: produced by Joel Diamond this version - credited mononymously to Lorna - featured background vocals by members of the Village People.
- Tracey Ullman remade "Where the Boys Are" for her 1984 album You Caught Me Out.
- Michael Callen's 1988 album Purple Heart opens with a cover of "Where the Boys Are", that includes a few minor lyric changes.
- Linda Martin reached No. 19 on the Irish charts with a 1990 remake of "Where the Boys Are".
- Voice actress Kath Soucie performed a cover version of "Where the Boys Are" as her animated skunk character Fifi La Fume from the Tiny Toon Adventures TV series for the 1992 album, Tiny Toons Sing!
- The Czars recorded a studio version of the song that appeared on their 2006 b-sides and out-takes album, Sorry I Made You Cry.
- Gerard Joling remade "Where the Boys Are" for his 2004 album, Nostalgia.
- Song co-writer Neil Sedaka included a demo version of the song on his 2007 album, The Definitive Collection.
- Ricky Koole remade "Where The Boys Are" for her 2014 album, No Use Crying.
- Mary Sarah recorded "Where the Boys Are" for her 2014 album Bridges: the track is a duet with its composer Neil Sedaka. Mary performed the song solo on the February 29, 2016 episode of the U.S. version of The Voice.
