= Breakin' in a Brand New Broken Heart =

Single by Connie Francis
- B-side: "Someone Else's Boy"
- Released: April 1961
- Recorded: October 18, 1960
- Genre: Country pop
- Length: 2:35
- Label: MGM
- Songwriters: Howard Greenfield, Jack Keller

Connie Francis singles chronology
"Where the Boys Are" (1961)	"Breakin' in a Brand New Broken Heart" (1961)	"Together" (1961)

"Breakin' in a Brand New Broken Heart" is a popular song written by Howard Greenfield and Jack Keller.

== Background ==
It was recorded by Connie Francis in an October 18, 1960, New York City session conducted and arranged by Stan Applebaum; the same session produced "Where the Boys Are". Like Francis' previous Greenfield/Keller-penned hit "Everybody's Somebody's Fool", "Breakin' in a Brand New Broken Heart" exemplified the country pop sound and while unlike "Everybody's Somebody's Fool", "Breakin' in a Brand New Broken Heart" was not a C&W crossover for Francis herself.

== Chart performance ==
"Breakin' in a Brand New Broken Heart" was released as the follow-up single in April 1961, reaching the Top 10 in May with a Billboard Hot 100 peak of number 7 (number 5 on the Cash Box Pop 100).

Although "Breakin' in a Brand New Broken Heart" was Francis' seventh consecutive A-side to reach the Top 10 - and her eleventh Top 10 overall - the single did mark a dip in her popularity as, while Francis' previous eight singles had had both A- and B-sides chart, the single's B-side "Someone Else's Boy" was overlooked in the U.S. despite becoming an international success for Francis via her recording versions in eight languages.

In the UK, "Breakin' in a Brand New Broken Heart" reached number 12 in June 1961. In Canada it was number 14 for two weeks in May 1961. Elsewhere, the track reached the Top 10 in Australia (number 8) and New Zealand (number 2), that July. In September 1961, it reached number 7 in the Netherlands, with a Top 10 ranking in India in December. Also in 1961, Francis' rendering in Italian as "La Valle Senzo Eco" ("The valley without echo") was a Top 10 hit in Italy, reaching No. 6 there. It was her 3rd best charting Italian release.

== Cover versions ==
- The song entered C&W canon via a cover by the Wilburn Brothers on their 1962 album City Limits, as "Breaking in a Brand New Broken Heart"
- In 1978, Margo Smith remade the song for her Don't Break the Heart That Loves You LP, whose title cut, a remake of Francis' 1961 number one hit, had been a number one C&W hit.
- "Breakin' in a Brand New Broken Heart" was a number 25 C&W single in 1979 for Debby Boone. Her precedent single had also been a remake of a Connie Francis hit, specifically "My Heart Has a Mind of Its Own" (number 11 C&W); both tracks were featured on the Debby Boone album. In 1980, Boone attempted a third Connie Francis hit remake with her version of "Everybody's Somebody's Fool" which would fall short of the C&W Top 40 at number 48.
- A German rendering of the song: "Das kommt davon...", was recorded in 1961 by Gitte.
- Elda Viler (sl) recorded the Slovenian rendering "Dolina Brez Odmeva" in 1964 and also recorded "La Valle Senzo Eco" in 1965.
- A version in soumi: "Äsken särkyi sydämeni", was cut by Marjatta Leppänen(fi) for release in Finland.
