= Mamma (song) =

Popular song first written in 1941

"Mama"

Single by Connie Francis

from the album Connie Francis Sings Italian Favorites
- B-side: "Teddy" (K 12878 and others); "Robot Man" (45 MGM 1076)
- Released: February 1960
- Recorded: August 25, 1959; EMI Studios, London
- Genre: Country
- Length: 3:55
- Label: MGM Records
- Songwriters: Cesare Andrea Bixio, Bixio Cherubini, Harold Barlow, Phil Brito
- Producers: Norman Newell, Arnold Maxin

Connie Francis singles chronology
"Among My Souvenirs" / "God Bless America" (1959)	"Mama" (1960)	"Everybody's Somebody's Fool" / "Jealous of You (Tango della Gelosia)" (1960)

"Mamma" is a popular song composed in 1940 by Cesare Andrea Bixio with Italian lyrics by Bixio Cherubini under the title "Mamma son tanto felice" (Mum, I am so happy).

== Cover versions ==
The performers of this song included: Beniamino Gigli, Luciano Tajoli, Richard Tucker, Claudio Villa, Robertino Loreti, Violetta Villas, Muslim Magomayev, Luciano Pavarotti, Toto Cutugno, Andrea Bocelli, Sergio Franchi, Romina Arena, Jon Christos and Mario Frangoulis.

In 1946, the English lyrics were written by Harold Barlow and Phil Brito who had their popular recording hit the charts in May 1946 under the title of "Mama".

British singer David Whitfield also had a hit with the song, which reached number 12 in the UK Singles Chart in 1955. The British lyrics did differ from the American ones. The song was re-arranged and re-written by Geoffrey Parsons and John Turner.

The song was also recorded by Connie Francis in 1959 for her album Connie Francis Sings Italian Favorites, with her hit single released in February 1960. Arranged and conducted by Tony Osborne, the Connie Francis version of the song was a number two hit in the UK, number three in Canada, and peaked at number eight on the Billboard Hot 100 chart.

== In other languages ==
The song in German (as well as in Dutch and in English) was recorded by Dutch child singer Heintje Simons for his album Heintje in 1967 (lyrics written by Bruno Balz). Also Heintje performed Mama in Zum Teufel mit der Penne (1968) comedy film.
