= Stupid Cupid =

Song written by Howard Greenfield and Neil Sedaka

- New Zealand release picture sleeve

Single by Connie Francis
- B-side: "Carolina Moon"
- Released: June 1958
- Recorded: 1958
- Genre: Pop
- Length: 2:14
- Label: MGM Records
- Songwriters: Howard Greenfield, Neil Sedaka

Connie Francis singles chronology
"Heartaches" (1958)	"Stupid Cupid" (1958)	"Fallin'" (1958)

"Stupid Cupid"
- Cover for the Neil Sedaka version (Italy, 1959)

Single by Neil Sedaka

from the album Rock with Sedaka
- Released: 1959 (Italy)
- Genre: Brill Building
- Length: 2:16
- Label: RCA Italiana
- Songwriters: Howard Greenfield, Neil Sedaka

Official audio"Stupid Cupid" on YouTube

"Stupid Cupid" is a song written by Howard Greenfield and Neil Sedaka that became a hit for Connie Francis in 1958.

== Recording history ==
After almost three years of failure, Connie Francis finally had a hit in the spring of 1958 with a rock ballad version of the standard "Who's Sorry Now?" However, her next pair of singles were less successful. I'm Sorry I Made You Cry only reached #36 on the Billboard Hot 100 and Heartaches failed to chart at all. Francis recalls: "I knew I had to come up with a hit on the third record. It was crucial. I listened to every publisher's song in New York, but nothing was hitting me." Eventually Don Kirshner of Aldon Music had Greenfield and Sedaka, who were staff writers for Aldon, visit Francis at her home to pitch their songs, but she and close friend Bobby Darin argued that the slow, dense ballads they were offering didn't appeal to the teenager market. Francis asked if they had something faster and bouncier. Greenfield asked Sedaka to play "Stupid Cupid", an uptempo number intended for the Shepherd Sisters. Sedaka objected that Francis, a "classy lady," would be insulted to be pitched such a puerile song; but Greenfield dismissed Sedaka's objection, saying, "What have we got to lose, she hates everything we wrote, doesn't she? Play it already!" After hearing only a few lines Francis recalls: "I started jumping up and down and I said, 'That's it! You guys got my next record!'"

Francis cut "Stupid Cupid" on 18 June 1958 at Metropolitan Studio (NYC); LeRoy Holmes conducted the orchestra while Morty Kraft produced the session. Noteworthy in the recording is the uncredited bass guitar work; a complex and energetic riff that has survived the decades and has proven to be one of early rock and roll's best recorded bass guitar sessions. A version of "Carolina Moon" recorded at Metropolitan Studio that 9 June with Kraft producing and Joe Lipman conducting was utilized as the B-side. "Stupid Cupid" provided a reasonably strong comeback vehicle for Francis reaching the Top 15 that August with a Billboard Hot 100 peak of #14. Francis would have to wait until 1959 to make her return to the Top 10 with "My Happiness".

In the UK Singles Chart Francis had made more chart impact than in the US with both "Who's Sorry Now?" (No. 1) and "I'm Sorry I Made You Cry" (No. 11). This trend continued with "Stupid Cupid" which, as a double sided hit with "Carolina Moon", spent six weeks at No. 1. Francis would remain a potent UK chart force for the next four years with fifteen Top Twenty singles, eight of them Top Ten, but she would never again reach the top of the UK Singles Chart despite topping the US charts three times in the early 1960s. In Canada the song reached No. 12.

Sedaka recorded his own version in 1959, and it saw a single release in Italy on the RCA Italiana label.

== See also ==
- List of UK Singles Chart number ones of the 1950s
