= Everybody's Somebody's Fool =

1960 No. 1 hit song for Connie Francis

Single by Connie Francis
- B-side: "Jealous of You (Tango della Gelosia)"
- Released: April 7, 1960
- Recorded: 1960
- Genre: Country; pop; easy listening
- Length: 2:37
- Label: MGM
- Songwriters: Jack Keller; Howard Greenfield
- Producer: Arnold Maxin

Connie Francis singles chronology
"Mama" / "Teddy" (1960)	"Everybody's Somebody's Fool" (1960)	"My Heart Has a Mind of Its Own" / "Malagueña" (1960)

"Everybody's Somebody's Fool" is a song written by Jack Keller and Howard Greenfield that was a No. 1 hit for Connie Francis in 1960. A polka-style version in German, "Die Liebe ist ein seltsames Spiel", was the first German single recorded and released by Connie Francis, and it reached No. 1 on the single chart in 1960 in West Germany.

== Recording ==
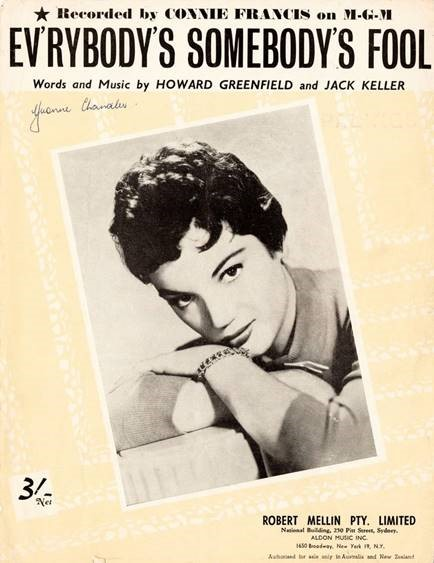
Sheet Music for the composition Everybody's Somebody's Fool

"Everybody's Somebody's Fool" was written as a bluesy ballad, and the song was recorded at Olmstead Studios (NYC) during the 1960 recording session when Francis cut the song with the Joe Sherman Orchestra.

The arrangement performed by Connie Francis is noted for its organ introduction.

The song originally recorded by Connie Francis entitled "Everybody's Somebody's Fool" is often confused with an earlier song of the same title written by Ace Adams and Regina Adams. Jimmy Scott re-wrote part of the song but never got credit; instead, Gladys Hampton put her name on it. Originally first recorded by Little Jimmy Scott December 1949 and was a 1950 hit record with the Lionel Hampton Orchestra. The song also has been recorded by LaVern Baker, Red Garland, Michael Jackson, Jan & Dean, Etta James, the Heartbeats (No. 78, 1957), Clyde McPhatter, Arthur Prysock, Ernie Andrews, Jimmy Scott recorded several more times in his career, Kay Starr, Dakota Staton, Betty Carter, Nancy Wilson and Dinah Washington.

== Chart performance ==
In the US, "Everybody's Somebody's Fool" was intended to serve as the B-side for the track "Jealous of You (Tango della Gelosia)", which like Francis's precedent A-side hit "Mama" was a ballad of Italian origin. However, most American radio stations preferred to play "Everybody's Somebody's Fool" and, while "Jealous of You" did reach No. 19, "Everybody's Somebody's Fool" reached No. 1 on the Billboard Hot 100 on 27 June 1960 and remained there the following week. It was the first song by a female artist to reach the top position of the Hot 100. The first of Francis's three US No. 1's, "Everybody's Somebody's Fool" was also ranked on the R&B chart at No. 2 and was the only one of Francis's major hits to cross over to the C&W charts where it peaked at No. 24.

A No. 5 hit in the UK, "Everybody's Somebody's Fool" was No. 1 in Australia for three weeks in July 1960 and in South Africa ranked as the No. 15 hit for that year. "Everybody's Somebody's Fool" was also No. 1 in Norway for eight weeks.

== Charts ==
=== Weekly charts ===
Chart (1960)	Peak position
Canada (CHUM Hit Parade)	1
France (IFOP)	47
West Germany (GfK)	26
Netherlands (Single Top 100)	3
New Zealand (Lever Hit Parade)	1
Norway (VG-lista)	1
UK Singles (Official Charts)	5
US Billboard Hot 100	1

=== All-time charts ===
Chart (1958–2018)	Position
US Billboard Hot 100	580

== "Die Liebe ist ein seltsames Spiel" ==
"Die Liebe ist ein seltsames Spiel"

Single by Connie Francis
- B-side: "Robot Man"
- Released: 1960
- Recorded: 1960 at Radio Recorders, Hollywood
- Genre: Rock and roll
- Length: 2:10
- Label: MGM Records 61 025
- Songwriters: Jack Keller (music); Howard Greenfield (original English lyrics); Ralph Maria Siegel (German lyrics)
- Producers: Arnold Maxin; Bobby Schmidt; Gerhard Mendelsohn

Connie Francis German singles chronology
"Die Liebe ist ein seltsames Spiel" (1960)	"Ich komm' nie mehr von dir los" / "Singing the Blues" (1960)

In her autobiography Who's Sorry Now?, published in 1984, Francis mentioned that in the early years of her career the language barrier in certain European countries made it difficult for her songs to get airplay, especially in Germany. Francis continued that Germany's most popular singer, Freddy Quinn, often sold two to three million records per song, equivalent to about twelve million in the United States. Using this as the basis for her April 1960 recording, "Everybody's Somebody's Fool", which had initially been written as a ballad, Francis convinced the songwriters to speed up the song's tempo and revive the innovative drum rhythm from Guy Mitchell's 1959 hit recording "Heartaches by the Number", which had been a No. 1 in Germany in its German cover version "Ich zähle täglich meine Sorgen" for Peter Alexander. Although "Everybody's Somebody's Fool" became her first No. 1 on the US charts, and its B-side "Jealous of You (Tango della Gelosia)" became a huge hit in Italy, it failed to make any impression on the German charts.

Veteran lyricist Ralph Maria Siegel penned a set of German lyrics, named "Die Liebe ist ein seltsames Spiel" (which translates to "Love is a strange game"), which was subsequently recorded by several artists already established on the German market such as Siw Malmkvist – self-harmonizing as the Jolly Sisters – or the Honey Twins (a German duo despite their English name). When these versions also failed to score as hits, Francis decided to record the song in German herself contrary to her producers' wishes who had advised against it despite the fact that Connie Francis Sings Italian Favorites had been such a huge success and she was currently planning a second Italian album as well as a Spanish album and an album in Hebrew and Yiddish. But Francis insisted on a German version of her own, and after some further friction between Francis herself, her producers and the managers of MGM Records, "Die Liebe ist ein seltsames Spiel" was recorded in June 1960 with producer Arnold Maxin.

=== Release and chart success ===
When the recording was finished, MGM producers on both sides of the Atlantic renewed their doubts in the song. They believed the release would mean "career suicide" for Francis in Europe. However, Francis's unusual contract with MGM Records guaranteed her unlimited control over the release of her recorded material, and she persisted.

When executives of Polydor, distribution partner of MGM Records in Germany, pointed out that German listeners wouldn't be able to understand Francis' vocals during the first verse for the lack of correct pronunciation, Francis agreed to delete the first verse from the recording. After that, "Die Liebe ist ein seltsames Spiel" was finally released in an edited version.

The song peaked at No. 1 in Germany for two weeks, as it did in many other countries and Francis would have six more No. 1 hits on the German charts and fifteen Top 10 hits. "Die Liebe ist ein seltsames Spiel" became the best-selling single of 1960 in West Germany, where the original English version of the song also reached No. 25. Contrary to popular belief, Francis did not record any further foreign language versions of "Everybody's Somebody's Fool"; the German version is the only one recorded by herself although other artists have recorded further cover versions in various languages such as Portuguese, Swedish, or even Finnish.

The B-side of the single was "Robot Man" which had been a No. 2 for Francis on the UK charts earlier that year. Since it was an English-language recording, German audiences took almost no notice of it.

The unabridged version of "Die Liebe ist ein seltsames Spiel" was released for the first time in 1964 in the U.S. on the album Connie Francis Sings German Favorites.

== Other versions ==
In 1960, Ernest Tubb had a No. 16 US country hit with his rendition of the song, produced by Owen Bradley. During the very early 1960s, Broadway Record Label released a version of this song on an EP – 45 rpm record that featured the vocals "as sung by Popular Artists", none of which are listed. "Everybody's Somebody's Fool" was remade in 1979 by Debby Boone, who had previously had Top 20 C&W hits with her Connie Francis hit remakes "My Heart Has a Mind of Its Own" and "Breakin' in a Brand New Broken Heart"; however, Boone's version of "Everybody's Somebody's Fool" only reached No. 48 C&W. The song has also been an album cut for Lynn Anderson, James Booker, Pat Boone, Margo, Jody Miller, Marie Osmond, Sandy Posey, Billy Vaughn, Kitty Wells and Bobby Vee.

Translated versions of the song include those made by Celly Campello (pt) (in Portuguese as "Alguém é bobo de alguém"), Marketta Joutsi and also Sinikka Lehtevä (in Finnish as "Pajunköyttä") and Siw Malmkvist (in Swedish as "Tunna skivor" and in Danish as "Den kolde skulder"). The Czech rendering "Až na severní pól" was recorded in 1962 as a duet by Yvetta Simonová (cs) and Milan Chladil (cs). An Icelandic version, "Allir eru einhvers apaspil", was recorded by María Baldursdóttir, with lyrics written by Rúnar Júlíusson (is).

== See also ==
- List of Billboard Hot 100 number-one singles of 1960
- List of number-one hits of 1960 (Germany)
- List of number-one hits in Norway
