= My Happiness (1948 song) =

Song composed by Borney Bergantine, lyrics by Betty Peterson

Song
- Published: 1948
- Songwriters: Betty Peterson Blasco, Borney Bergantine

"My Happiness" is a pop music standard, which was initially made famous in the mid-20th century. An unpublished version of the melody with different lyrics was written by Borney Bergantine in 1933. The most famous version of the song, with lyrics by Betty Peterson Blasco, was published for the first time in 1948.

The first known recording of this version was in December 1947 by the Marlin Sisters, but the song first became a hit in May 1948 as recorded by Jon and Sondra Steele (Damon 11133) (number two), with rival versions by the Pied Pipers (Capitol 1628/15094) and an a cappella version by Ella Fitzgerald (Decca 24446) entering the charts that June, reaching respectively numbers three and six with the Marlin Sisters version (Columbia 38217) finally charting with a number-24 peak that July. A version by John Laurenz (Mercury catalog number 5144, with the flip side "Someone Cares"), entered the Billboard magazine charts on August 7, 1948, where it stayed for two weeks, peaking at number 26.

== Connie Francis rendition ==
"My Happiness"

Single by Connie Francis

from the album The Very Best of Connie Francis – Connie's 15 Biggest Hits
- B-side: "Never Before"
- Released: 1958
- Recorded: 6 November 1958
- Studio: Radio Recorders (Hollywood)
- Genre: Easy listening
- Length: 2:28
- Label: MGM (K 12738)
- Songwriters: Betty Peterson Blasco, Borney Bergantine
- Producers: Morton Craft, Jesse Kaye

Connie Francis US singles chronology
"Fallin'" (1958)	"My Happiness" (1958)	"Lipstick on Your Collar/Frankie" (1959)

Connie Francis – whose favorite song had been the Jon and Sondra Steele version of "My Happiness" – remade the song in a November 6, 1958, session at the Radio Recorders studio in Hollywood, California, produced by Morton Craft and Jesse Kaye; David Rose conducted the orchestra. The song almost became Francis's first number-one hit in the first months of 1959, but was kept at number two by another remake of a standard, the Platters' version of "Smoke Gets in Your Eyes". In Canada the song reached number four.

== Other versions ==
Elvis Presley's "My Happiness" is one of two songs—the other being "That's When Your Heartaches Begin"—Presley recorded in July 1953 during his first recording session at the Memphis Recording Service (Sun Studios). In January 2015, Presley's version of "My Happiness" was sold to musician Jack White at an auction for $300,000.

German translation was provided by Gitta Lind and Christa Williams, as "My Happiness – Immer will ich treu dir sein" (Telefunken Records catalog number U 55 137), with the flip side "Ohne Dich" (Near You) published 1959.

Gerdi Berg's version with the same German lyrics was published as "Baccarola" (catalog number 25 007) in 1960.
