= Many Tears Ago =

Single by Connie Francis
- B-side: "Senza Mama (With No One)"
- Released: October 1960
- Genre: Pop
- Length: 1:53
- Label: MGM
- Songwriter: Winfield Scott

Connie Francis singles chronology
"My Heart Has a Mind of Its Own" (1960)	"Many Tears Ago" (1960)	"Where the Boys Are" (1961)

"Many Tears Ago" is a song written by Winfield Scott and most notably performed by Connie Francis, who released it as a single in late 1960 under MGM Records.

== Connie Francis version ==
=== Background ===
Before "Many Tears Ago", "My Heart Has a Mind of Its Own" had become Francis' second consecutive A-side to top the Billboard Hot 100 reaching No. 1 on the chart dated 26 September 1960 and holding there the following week. The single also marked Francis' final appearance of the R&B charts at No. 11.

=== Release and reception ===
Following the success she would release "Many Tears Ago" as a seven inch single in October 1960 under MGM Records. It was backed by a Neapolitan song, "Senza Mama (With No One)" on the B-side, which was later included in her More Italian Favorites album, released a month later. Francis would highlight the single in her appearance at the Copacabana, for her live album Connie Francis at the Copa.

Cashbox magazine reviewed the single in November and said that her "waxing" of the song will keep her high in the charts and noted that "...tune is an up beat weeper with a 'Singing The Blues' flavor, which the lark shuffles thru in her coin-catching style", also calling the B-side a "...beautiful Neapolitan affair".

=== Chart performance ===
"Many Tears Ago" reached No. 7 on the Billboard Hot 100, No. 9 on the Cashbox Top 100 Singles, and peaked at No. 6 on the Record World (then called Music Vendor) singles chart. Outside of America the single sold well, reaching No. 6 in Canada, and peaking at No. 12 on the UK Record Retailer Singles Chart in early 1961. In Australia the single reached No. 18.

The single's B-side, "Senza Mama (With No One)", reached No. 87 on the Billboard Hot 100 and No. 95 on the Record World (then called Music Vendor) singles chart.

=== Track listing ===
7" vinyl single

- "Many Tears Ago" - 1:53
- "Senza Mama (With No One)" – 4:01

== Other versions ==
- "Big" Tiny Little released a version of the song on his 1961 album "Big" Tiny Little In Person.
- Willie Bobo released a version of the song on his 1968 album Spanish Blues Band.
- Ray Condo & His Ricochets released a version of the song on their 2000 album High & Wild.
- Emmy Rossum released a version of the song on her 2013 album Sentimental Journey.
