= All Together Now (franchise) =

Reality singing competition television format

- Original work: All Together Now (United Kingdom)
- Owner: Banijay Entertainment
- Years: 2018–present

All Together Now (also known with local varying titles in some countries broadcasting the format) is a reality television singing competition format.

== History ==
The format began in 2018 with the British television series on BBC One; its first adaptation was the Brazilian series known as Canta Comigo followed by Danish and Australian editions under the title All Together Now and a Polish edition Śpiewajmy razem. All Together Now.

Many other countries have scheduled local editions including Colombia (A otro Nivel: Canta Conmigo), France (Together, tous avec moi), Germany (Sing Mit Mir), Italy (All Together Now), Netherlands (All Together Now), Romania (Cântă acum cu mine), Russia (Ну-ка, все вместе) and Portugal (All Together Now). In 2021, Malaysia has taken the steps to release their local edition as well called "All Together Now Malaysia" which is the first country in Asia to adapt the series.

== Format ==
In each episode, a range of singers take to the stage, but waiting to judge each performance is 'The 100' – a unique panel of one hundred music experts and performers from across the country. The initial UK edition was hosted by comedian Rob Beckett and the first UK series consisted of six episodes: five heats and the final.

=== The heats ===
During each heat, performers try and outscore their competitors in order to earn a seat on the top three podium. Whenever a performer scores high enough for a podium place, the act in 3rd place is eliminated as a result.

From each heat, two acts go through to the series final. Once all acts have sung, the 1st placed performer with the highest score automatically goes through. The acts in 2nd and 3rd sing off against one another and the winner of that sing off earns the second qualification spot.

Prior to filming, all performers choose the song they want to sing. The 100 learn the words to all the songs before the show, but they don't know who is going to come out and sing said songs to them. Each song is approximately 90 seconds long, but importantly the 100 can only join in for the final 60 seconds as signified by a lighting change. This means that the 100 have the same amount of time to join in the singing for every act.

=== Tie-breaks ===
In the event of a tied score, the 100 review the full performances of both acts on monitors in studio. Each member of the 100 decides which act they prefer and votes by pressing their button. The act with the most votes takes their seat on the podium, meaning that the act with the fewer votes either drops down a podium place or exits the competition. In the event that the tiebreak vote is also tied, the host, as captain of the 100 has the casting vote.

=== The sing-off ===
For the sing-off at the end of the show, scores are reset to zero and the 2nd and 3rd placed acts perform a new song chosen from a given shortlist. In the event that both acts wish to sing the same song from that shortlist, the performer in 2nd place has priority.

=== The final and the prize ===
In the final, the ten finalists (the first placed performer and sing-off winner from each heat) perform again in front of The 100 with a new song. This time, all three acts who finish in the top three podium seats sing again and the act with the highest score after this final sing off wins the series and with it a cash prize.

== International versions ==
Franchise with a currently airing season
Franchise awaiting confirmation
Franchise with an upcoming season
Franchise with an unknown status
Franchise that was cancelled during development
Franchise no longer in production
Franchise on hold

Country/Region	Name	Network	Premiere	Host(s)	Winners	Ref.
Argentina	Canta Conmigo Ahora	eltrece	July 25, 2022	Marcelo Tinelli (1–2); Manuel Wirzt (3)	Season 1, 2022: Nicolás Reyna; Season 2, 2022: Dámaris Zulli; Season 3, 2023: Chelzye	
Australia	All Together Now	Seven Network	October 7, 2018	Julia Zemiro; Ronan Keating (captain)	Season 1, 2018: Lai Utovou	
Brazil	Canta Comigo	RecordTV	July 18, 2018	Gugu Liberato (1–2); Rodrigo Faro (3–5)	Season 1, 2018: Débora Pinheiro; Season 2, 2019: Franson; Season 3, 2021: Braunna Siblings; Season 4, 2022: Anna Maz; Season 5, 2023: Helleno	
Brazil	Canta Comigo Teen	RecordTV	October 4, 2020	Rodrigo Faro	Season 1, 2020: Sidinho; Season 2, 2021: Kássia Santos; Season 3, 2022: Emmanuel Ferraro; Season 4, 2023: Currently airing	
Brazil	Canta Comigo Especial	RecordTV	December 18, 2018	Gugu Liberato	Season 1, 2018: Tiago Mendes	
Brazil	Canta Comigo All-Stars	RecordTV	December 21, 2020	Xuxa Meneghel	Season 1, 2020: Ivan Lima	
Chile	Canta Conmigo Chile	Canal 13	TBA	TBA	Season 1, 2024: TBA	
Colombia	A Otro Nivel: Canta Conmigo	Caracol	February 5, 2020	Paulina Vega	Season 1, 2020: Alexandra Colorado; Season 2, TBA: Awaiting confirmation	
Denmark	All Together Now: Danmark	Kanal 5	August 18, 2018	Christopher Læssø; Mette Lindberg (captain, 1); Joey Moe (captain, 2)	Season 1, 2018: Annelie Karui Saemala; Season 2, 2019: Miriam Gardner; Season 3, TBA: Awaiting confirmation	
Finland	All Together Now Suomi	Nelonen	October 24, 2020	Jaana Pelkonen; Laura Voutilainen (captain)	Season 1, 2020: Heroines	
France	Together, tous avec moi	M6; W9	April 30, 2019	Éric Antoine; Garou (captain)	Season 1, 2019: Jessie Will	
Germany	All Together Now	Sat.1	May 27, 2022	Melissa Khalaj	Season 1, 2022: Various	
Italy	All Together Now; All Together Now - La musica è cambiata	Canale 5	May 16, 2019	Michelle Hunziker; J-Ax (captain)	Season 1, 2019: Gregorio Rega; Season 2, 2019–20: Sonia Mosca; Season 3, Fall 2020: Cahayadi "Eki" Kam; Season 4, 2021: Giacomo Voli	
Malaysia	All Together Now Malaysia	Astro Ria	June 6, 2021 (Note: The series was then halted until it re-aired on September 12, 2021 due to COVID-19 Standard Operating Procedure violations (applies only for Season 1).)	Sherry Alhadad; AC Mizal (captain, 1); Syafinaz Selamat (captain, 2)	Season 1, 2021: Idris Brown; Season 2, 2022–23: Khairul Nizam	
Malaysia	All Together Now Malaysia: Astro's 25th Anniversary Special (Note: A special episode)	Astro Ria; Astro 25 (pop-up channel)	September 11, 2021	Sherry Alhadad; AC Mizal (captain)	Adinda Tasya Mansor	
Malaysia	All Together Now Malaysia: Merdeka Special	Astro Ria; Gemilang (pop-up channel)	August 28, 2022	Sherry Alhadad; Aznil Nawawi (captain)	W.A.R.I.S	
Netherlands	All Together Now	RTL4	May 3, 2019	Chantal Janzen; Jamai Loman (captain, 1); Gerard Joling (captain, 2)	Season 1, 2019: Various; Season 2, 2019–20: Various	
Norway	All Together Now Norge	TVNorge	January 8, 2019	Anne Rimmen; Didrik Solli-Tangen (captain)	Season 1, 2019: Niklas Arnesen; Season 2, TBA: Awaiting confirmation	
Peru	Canta Conmigo Perú	-	TBA	TBA	Season 1: Not aired yet	
Poland	Śpiewajmy razem. All Together Now	Polsat	September 5, 2018	Igor Kwiatkowski (1); Ewa Farna (captain, 1); Mariusz Kałamaga (2); Beata Kozidrak (captain, 2)	Season 1, 2018: Mateusz Łopaciuk; Season 2, 2019: Salwin Merstein-Siwak	
Portugal	All Together Now	TVI	March 7, 2021	Cristina Ferreira	Season 1, 2021: Catarina Castanhas; Season 2, TBA: Awaiting confirmation	
Romania	Cântă acum cu mine	Pro TV	March 3, 2019	Cabral Ibacka; Loredana Groza (captain)	Season 1, 2019: Ludmila Danilceac	
Russia	Ну-ка, все вместе! Nu-ka, vse vmeste! (Note: Since 2022, the show airs without Banijay's involvement in the production.)	Russia-1	March 23, 2019	Nikolay Baskov; Sergey Lazarev (captain)	Season 1, 2019: Andrey Lisovsky; Season 2, 2020: Jana Klavina; Season 3, 2021: Syuzanna Melkonyan; Season 4, 2022: Varvara Ubel; All-star Season, 2023: Sergey Pavlovsky; Season 5, 2023: Farrukh Khasanov; Season 6, 2024: Elen Badalyan; Season 7, 2025: Ilya Bulygin	
Russia	Ну-ка, все вместе! Хором! All Together Now! Choirs!	Russia-1	February 2, 2024	Nikolay Baskov; Sergey Lazarev (captain)	Season 1, 2024: Academic Men's Choir of MEPhI with conductor Nadezhda Malyavina; Season 2, 2025: Children's Choir "Capella" with conductor Dmitry Zheleznov and Russian Song Choir from Vladimir with conductor Olga Kozyreva; Season 3, 2026: Children's Choir "Aurora" with conductor Anastasiya Belyaeva	
Turkey	Benimle Söyle	Kanal D	May 11, 2019	Enis Arıkan; Birce Akalay (captain)	Season 1, 2019: Uğur Öz; Season 2, TBA: Awaiting confirmation	
Ukraine	Співають всі Spivayut vsi	Ukraina	August 21, 2021	Volodymyr Ostapchuk; Natalia Mohylevska (captain)	Season 1, 2021: Muayad Abdelrahim	
United Kingdom (Original)	All Together Now	BBC One	January 27, 2018	Rob Beckett; Geri Halliwell (captain)	Season 1, 2018: Michael Rice; Season 2, 2019: Shellyann Evans	
United Kingdom (Original)	All Together Now: Celebrity Special	BBC One	December 24, 2018	Rob Beckett; Geri Halliwell (captain)	Season 1, 2018: Laurie Brett	
