= All Together Now (German TV series) =

- Genre: Talent show
- Presented by: Melissa Khalaj
- Starring: The 100
- Country of origin: Germany
- Original language: German
- No. of seasons: 1
- No. of episodes: 6

Production
- Production locations: MMC Studios, Cologne
- Running time: 160 minutes (including commercials)
- Production company: EndemolShine Germany

Original release
- Network: Sat.1
- Release: 27 May 2022 – present

Related
- All Together Now (franchise)

All Together Now is a German reality television music competition which began airing on Sat.1 on 27 May 2022, based on the concept of the British show of the same name, All Together Now and its international series. It was presented by Melissa Khalaj.

== Format ==
In every episode, a range of singers take to the stage, but waiting to judge each performance is 'The 100' – a unique panel of one hundred music experts and performers from across Germany.

=== The heats ===
During each heat, performers try and outscore their competitors in order to earn a seat on the top three podium. Whenever a performer scores high enough for a podium place, the act in 3rd place is eliminated as a result.

Prior to filming, all performers choose the song they want to sing. The 100 learn the words to all the songs before the show, but they don't know who is going to come out and sing said songs to them. Each song is approximately 100 seconds long, but importantly the 100 can only join in for the final 40 seconds as signified by a lighting change. This means that the 100 have the same amount of time to join in the singing for every act.

=== Tie-breaks ===
In the event of a tied score, the 100 review the full performances of both acts on monitors in studio. One member from the 100 decide which act they prefer. The act who was selected takes their seat on the podium, meaning that the act with the fewer votes either drops down a podium place or exits the competition.

=== The final and the prize ===
For the final at the end of the show, scores are reset to zero and the three finalists perform again in front of The 100 with a new song chosen from a given shortlist, the performer in 1st place has priority. The act with the highest score after this final sing off wins the episode and with it a cash prize of €10,000.

== Production ==
On 2018–2019, it was announced that RTL would air the show, with the name Sing mit mir, but later EndemolShine Germany announced that the show will not be airing on RTL. In June 2021, Sat.1 announced that the show would air in 2022, with the name All Together Now.

It was rumored that Luke Mockridge, would present the show. In October 2021, Sat.1 announced that the presenter will be Melissa Khalaj.

== Performances ==
Key
– Artist advanced to the finals with an all-100 stand up
– Artist advanced to the finals the highest score
– Artist advanced to the finals in either 2nd or 3rd place
– Artist score enough points to place in the Top 3 but was moved out and eliminated
– Artist didn't score enough points to place in the Top 3 and was directly eliminated

=== Episode 1 (27 May) ===
- Opening song: "Hey Ya!" by Outkast (Melissa Khalaj and the 100)

Running order

| Order | Name | Song | Score | Place | Result |
|---|---|---|---|---|---|
| 1 | Keye Katcher | "Radio Ga Ga" by Queen | 91 | 1st | Eliminated |
| 2 | Lukas Müller | "Lass uns gehen" by Revolverheld | 68 | 2nd | Eliminated |
| 3 | Celi Ribbeck | "American Boy" by Estelle feat. Kanye West | 75 | 2nd | Eliminated |
| 4 | Philipp Bender | "Komm und bedien dich" by Peter Alexander | 76 | 2nd | Eliminated |
| 5 | Antje Schmidt | "Toxic" by Britney Spears | 41 | — | Eliminated |
| 6 | Albino & Nati Casaluci | "Sarà perché ti amo" by Ricchi e Poveri | 79 | 2nd | Eliminated |
| 7 | Marina Prusac | "Hit the Road Jack" by Ray Charles | 90 | 2nd | Eliminated |
| 8 | Bobby Anne Baker | "Schöner fremder Mann" by Connie Francis | 41 | — | Eliminated |
| 9 | Max Schmitz | "Giant" by Calvin Harris & Rag'n'Bone Man | 95 | 1st | Advanced |
| 10 | Mandy, Sophie, Lisa-Marie & Harry | "Everybody (Backstreet's Back)" by Backstreet Boys | 24 | — | Eliminated |
| 11 | Esther Nkongo | "Fix You" by Coldplay | 97 | 1st | Advanced |
| 12 | Benji Dettinger | "Crazy" by Gnarls Barkley | 97 | 2nd^{^{1}} | Advanced |

- ^Note 1 : Tie between Esther Nkongo and Benji Dettinger for 1st. Esther Nkongo was selected for 1st. Max Schmitz moved (3rd); Keye Katcher was eliminated.

Final

| Order | Name | Song | Score | Result |
|---|---|---|---|---|
| 1 | Max Schmitz | "Dancing with Tears in My Eyes" by Ultravox | 75 | Third place |
| 2 | Benji Dettinger | "Proud Mary" by Ike & Tina Turner | 95 | Winner |
| 3 | Esther Nkongo | "Feeling Good" by Michael Bublé | 91 | Runner-up |

=== Episode 2 (3 June) ===
- Opening song: "(You Gotta) Fight for Your Right (To Party!)" by Beastie Boys (Melissa Khalaj and the 100)

Running order

| Order | Name | Song | Score | Place | Result |
|---|---|---|---|---|---|
| 1 | George & Eddy | "Everybody Needs Somebody to Love" by The Blues Brothers | 76 | 1st | Eliminated |
| 2 | Maria | "L'Italiano" by Toto Cutugno | 66 | 2nd | Eliminated |
| 3 | Sylvia Lux-Wietstock | "I Love Rock 'n' Roll" by Joan Jett & the Blackhearts | 30 | 3rd | Eliminated |
| 4 | Anja Steiner & Yanina Niedick | "This Is Me" by Keala Settle & The Greatest Showman | 92 | 1st | Advanced |
| 5 | Aykut Reis | "Pon de Replay" by Rihanna | 40 | — | Eliminated |
| 6 | Roberto Padrevecchi | "My Way" by Frank Sinatra | 92^{^{2}} | 2nd | Eliminated |
| 7 | Isabelle Croft | "The Phantom of the Opera" by Nightwish | 65 | — | Eliminated |
| 8 | Dirk Füller | "Über sieben Brücken musst du gehen" by Peter Maffay | 44 | — | Eliminated |
| 9 | Julia Reinhard | "Let Me Entertain You" by Robbie Williams | 96 | 1st | Advanced |
| 10 | Manuel Ugardovic | "Walking on Sunshine" by Katrina and the Waves | 53 | — | Eliminated |
| 11 | Samira Hofbauer | "I'm So Excited" by The Pointer Sisters | 96 | 1st | Advanced |
| 12 | Ayke Witt & Fabian Riaz | "Titanium" by David Guetta feat. Sia | 90 | — | Eliminated |

- ^Note 2 : Tie between Anja Steiner & Yanina Niedick and Roberto Padrevecchi for 1st. Anja Steiner & Yanina Niedick was selected for 1st. George & Eddy moved (3rd); Maria was eliminated.
- ^Note 3 : Tie between Julia Reinhard and Samira Hofbauer for 1st. Samira Hofbauer was selected for 1st. Anja Steiner & Yanina Niedick moved (3rd); Roberto Padrevecchi was eliminated.

Final

| Order | Name | Song | Score | Result |
|---|---|---|---|---|
| 1 | Samira Hofbauer | "Symphonie" by Silbermond | 98 | Winner |
| 2 | Anja Steiner & Yanina Niedick | "Call Me Maybe" by Carly Rae Jepsen | 79 | Third place |
| 3 | Julia Reinhard | "Like a Prayer" by Madonna | 92 | Runner-up |

=== Episode 3 (10 June) ===
- Opening song: "Relight My Fire" by Take That feat. Lulu (Melissa Khalaj and the 100)

Running order

| Order | Name | Song | Score | Place | Result |
|---|---|---|---|---|---|
| 1 | Gladys Mwachiti | "I Wanna Dance with Somebody (Who Loves Me)" by Whitney Houston | 84 | 1st | Advanced |
| 2 | Ricardo Marinello | "Volare" by Gipsy Kings | 73 | 2nd | Eliminated |
| 3 | Jomila & Susi | "Prisoner" by Miley Cyrus feat. Dua Lipa | 19 | 3rd | Eliminated |
| 4 | Leopold | "Rolling in the Deep" by Adele | 81 | 2nd | Advanced |
| 5 | Molley Morgan | "Astronaut" by Sido & Andreas Bourani | 15 | — | Eliminated |
| 6 | Shahad Shane | "Valerie" by Mark Ronson feat. Amy Winehouse | 46 | — | Eliminated |
| 7 | Bobby Bobbsn | "You Give Me Something" by James Morrison | 64 | — | Eliminated |
| 8 | Penelope Athena Foschini | "Kiss" by Prince & The Revolution | 47 | — | Eliminated |
| 9 | Camilo Botero | "La Camisa Negra" by Juanes | 26 | — | Eliminated |
| 10 | Kai Nötting & Felix Brückner | "Dickes B" by Seeed | 87 | 1st | Advanced |
| 11 | Jessica Movahed Fard | "Lady Marmalade" by Christina Aguilera, Lil' Kim, Mya & Pink | 73 | — | Eliminated |
| 12 | Tim Schultheiss | "Sign of the Times" by Harry Styles | 42 | — | Eliminated |

Final

| Order | Name | Song | Score | Result |
|---|---|---|---|---|
| 1 | Gladys Mwachiti | "You're the Voice" by John Farnham | 78 | Runner-up |
| 2 | Kai Nötting & Felix Brückner | "Angels" by Robbie Williams | 44 | Third place |
| 3 | Leopold | "Chöre" by Mark Forster | 84 | Winner |

=== Episode 4 (17 June) ===
- Opening song: "Uptown Girl" by Billy Joel (Melissa Khalaj and the 100)

Running order

| Order | Name | Song | Score | Place | Result |
|---|---|---|---|---|---|
| 1 | Janet Taylor | "I Will Survive" by Gloria Gaynor | 73 | 1st | Eliminated |
| 2 | Matze Brietz | "Mr. Brightside" by The Killers | 33 | 2nd | Eliminated |
| 3 | Mina Richman | "Nah Neh Nah" by Vaya Con Dios | 83 | 1st | Eliminated |
| 4 | Enrico & Lino Filieri | "'O sole mio" | 64 | 3rd | Eliminated |
| 5 | Anna-Maria Zivkov | "Mercy" by Duffy | 50 | — | Eliminated |
| 6 | Uschi Frei | "Ich Will Keine Schokolade" by Trude Herr | 96 | 1st | Advanced |
| 7 | Franzi Stöger & Daniel Mehrsadeh | "Moves like Jagger" by Maroon 5 feat. Christina Aguilera | 31 | — | Eliminated |
| 8 | Robin Henderson | "Poison" by Alice Cooper | 87 | 2nd | Eliminated |
| 9 | Anna Belle | "Piece of My Heart" by Janis Joplin | 82 | — | Eliminated |
| 10 | Lillemor & Nathalie & Sarah | "Ab in den Süden" by Buddy | 98 | 1st | Advanced |
| 11 | Lina Ammor | "No Scrubs" by TLC | 42 | — | Eliminated |
| 12 | Sinan "Sinus" Öztürk | "Der Weg" by Herbert Grönemeyer | 93 | 3rd | Advanced |

Final

| Order | Name | Song | Score | Result |
|---|---|---|---|---|
| 1 | Uschi Frei | "Ohne dich" by Münchener Freiheit | 61 | Runner-up |
| 2 | Lillemor & Nathalie & Sarah | "Beggin'" by Måneskin | 97 | Winner |
| 3 | Sinan "Sinus" Öztürk | "König von Deutschland" by Rio Reiser | 55 | Third place |

=== Episode 5 (24 June) ===
- Opening song: "Karma Chameleon" by Culture Club (Melissa Khalaj and the 100)

Running order

| Order | Name | Song | Score | Place | Result |
|---|---|---|---|---|---|
| 1 | Jane, Ira & Honey | "Single Ladies (Put a Ring on It)" by Beyoncé | 95 | 1st | Advanced |
| 2 | Sheyda Minia | "Price Tag" by Jessie J feat. B.o.B | 51 | 2nd | Eliminated |
| 3 | Bodo Krecklow | "Take Me Home, Country Roads" by John Denver | 52 | 2nd | Eliminated |
| 4 | Sarah Ehnert | "Beautiful" by Christina Aguilera | 99 | 1st | Advanced |
| 5 | Dominik Bickel | "She's So High" by Tal Bachman | 68 | 3rd | Eliminated |
| 6 | Stacia | "Son of a Preacher Man" by Dusty Springfield | 43 | — | Eliminated |
| 7 | Patrick Patrone | "Johnny B. Goode" by Chuck Berry | 98 | 2nd | Advanced |
| 8 | Antonio Gerardi | "Caruso" by Lucio Dalla | 94 | — | Eliminated |
| 9 | Wally Quinn & Queen Naomi King | "Warum hast Du nicht nein gesagt" by Roland Kaiser & Maite Kelly | 52 | — | Eliminated |
| 10 | Niklas Cremerius | "Creep" by Radiohead | 69 | — | Eliminated |
| 11 | Steiling & Kurze | "Viva Las Vegas" by Elvis Presley | 52 | — | Eliminated |
| 12 | Philipp Leon | "Treasure" by Bruno Mars | 53 | — | Eliminated |

Final

| Order | Name | Song | Score | Result |
|---|---|---|---|---|
| 1 | Sarah Ehnert | "We Will Rock You" by Queen | 49 | Third place |
| 2 | Patrick Patrone | "Perfect" by Ed Sheeran | 60 | Runner-up |
| 3 | Jane, Ira & Honey | "Dynamite" by BTS | 98 | Winner |

=== Episode 6 (1 July) ===
- Opening song: "Love Shack" by The B-52's (Melissa Khalaj and the 100)

Running order

| Order | Name | Song | Score | Place | Result |
|---|---|---|---|---|---|
| 1 | Florian "Feelo" Witzler | "All Night Long (All Night)" by Lionel Richie | 82 | 1st | Eliminated |
| 2 | Ritchie Peters | "For Once in My Life" by Stevie Wonder | 63 | 2nd | Eliminated |
| 3 | Jasmin Mahamad | "Empire State of Mind" by Jay-Z ft. Alicia Keys | 78 | 2nd | Eliminated |
| 4 | Teddy Schmacht | "Ich war noch niemals in New York" by Udo Jürgens | 43 | — | Eliminated |
| 5 | Carolina Tödter | "Waiting for Tonight" by Jennifer Lopez | 28 | — | Eliminated |
| 6 | Elli Berlin | "Sonne" by Rammstein | 87 | 1st | Advanced |
| 7 | Matthias Marquardt | "That's Amore" by Dean Martin | 77 | — | Eliminated |
| 8 | Nastja Kiel | "All of Me" by John Legend | 87 | 2nd^{^{1}} | Eliminated |
| 9 | Alice Heinrich | "Diamonds Are a Girl's Best Friend" by Marilyn Monroe | 52 | — | Eliminated |
| 10 | Stephen Folkers | "Major Tom" by Peter Schilling | 42 | — | Eliminated |
| 11 | Moritz Steckenstein & Lou Lettow | "Nothing Compares 2 U" by Sinéad O'Connor & Prince | 100 | 1st | Advanced |
| 12 | Whitney, Leslie & Lisa-Pearl | "Shackles (Praise You)" by Mary Mary | 92 | 2nd | Advanced |

- ^Note 1 : Tie between Elli Berlin and Nastja Kiel for 1st. was selected for 1st. Florian "Feelo" Witzler moved (3rd); Jasmin Mahamad was eliminated.

Final

| Order | Name | Song | Score | Result |
|---|---|---|---|---|
| 1 | Moritz Steckenstein & Lou Lettow | "Halt mich" by Herbert Grönemeyer | 88 | Winner |
| 2 | Whitney, Leslie & Lisa-Pearl | "Just the Way You Are" by Bruno Mars | 64 | Third place |
| 3 | Elli Berlin | "Sex on Fire" by Kings of Leon | 82 | Runner-up |

== The 100 ==
The 100 are a range of music experts and performers from across Germany. Members of the 100 include:

- Adi Amati, Soul singer
- Alexander Herzog, Music performer
- Amin Afify, Singer and songwriter
- Andreas Melzer, Entertainer and DJ
- Andy Brings, Rock 'N' Roll singer, Producer, filmmaker and former member of the Sodom
- Aytug Gün, Singer and TV-Realitystar
- Bethany Barber, singer
- Bianca Körner, singer
- Carina Fitzi, Musical actress and member of the group Die Dirndln
- Charles Simmons, Vocal Coach
- Chris Koch, Singer and member of the group Boore
- Christine Ladda, singer
- Christopher Meyer, Singer and member of the group FÆM
- Clarissa Karnikowski, member of the group The Pearlettes
- Daniel Töplitzer, member of the group Die 3 Liköre
- Dave Grunewald, singer and former member of the Annisokay
- David E. Moore, Musician
- Deborah Woodson, Singer, songwriter and Vocal Coach
- Elada Sumanschii, Singer
- Esther Filly, Singer
- Frank Jakob, member of the group Die 3 Liköre
- Freddie Mandera, Country Musiker
- Gerrit Winter, Singer, presenter and vocal coach
- Giacomo di Benedetto, member of the group Die 3 Liköre
- Gisele Abramoff, Pop Dance singer and songwriter
- Giulia Wahn, Event manager and pop/soul/jazz singer
- Graham Candy, Singer-songwriter and Actor
- Hannah Valentin "VALENTIN", Singer and Producer
- Igor Epstein, Musician and Producer
- Ina Krabes, Singer
- Inka Auhagen, Songwriter, actress and presenter
- Jan Felix Brüseke, Musician, Management consultant and coach
- Jana Hohmann, member of the group Janou
- Jaqueline Bloem, Singer and member of the group Jacky & The Two Strokes
- Jasmin Shaudeen, member of the group The Pearlettes
- Jason Anousheh, Singer
- Jazzy Gudd, German singer, TV actress and presenter
- Judith van Hel, Punk rock singer
- Lenny Pojarov, Singer
- Linda Teodosiu, Singer
- Lisette Whitter, Singer
- Lucas Pinnow "Mücke", Singer
- Lukas Otte, Singer
- Magdalena Bönisch, Musical actress and member of the group Die Dirndln
- Maggie Mackenthun, member of the group Kozmic Blue
- Malte Fuhrer, Singer and actor
- Maria Nicolaides, Singer
- Marius Tilly, member of the group Janou
- Markus Grimm, Singer
- Martin Holtgreve, Singer
- Marvin A. Smith, Singer
- Mascha Winkels, also known as Frau Winzig, Singer-songwriter
- MC Fitti, German rapper
- Micha Hirsch, Singer, songwriter and entertainer
- Michael Wurst, Singer and stadium announcer
- Michel Gosewisch-Walk "Gloria Viagra", Drag Queen and DJ
- Michelle Hoffmann "Liah", Singer
- Mishell Ivon Walton, Singer
- Nadir Alami, Singer
- Natascha Garcia, Singer
- Neo Marks, Singer and Songwriter
- Nicola Anfuso "Nico David", Singer
- Nikoleta Kungurceva "Émina", Singer
- Nilz Bokelberg, TV and radio host, podcaster, singer and author
- Pam Pengco, Drag Queen and Singer
- Pamela Falcon, Singer
- Pat Bernetti, DJ and Singer
- Penni Jo Blatterman, Singer
- Percival Duke, Rock singer and songwriter
- Peter Brüne, Singer
- Ratan Julian Jhaveri, Singer, Producer and Music Supervisor for Disney musicals
- Ray Scott Pardue, Singer, songwriter and member of the German-American band 2THEUNIVERSE
- Roman Petermann, Singer and entertainer
- Sahira Awad, Rapper and author
- Saja-Christin Hüllsieck, Singer
- Sandhy Sondoro, Singer
- Sandy Djordjevic "Sandy Dae", Singer, rapper, songwriter, producer & DJ
- Sarah Proske, Singer
- SaraJane McMinn, Singer and songwriter
- Sascha Salvati, Singer and former member of the Room 2012
- Sharron Levy, Singer and songwriter
- Sofia Andersson, Singer
- Sora Gebel, Vocal Coach, Producer and Songwriter
- Stefan Track, Singer
- Stinny Stone, Performer, DJ and Designer
- Suzie Kerstgens, singer, lyricist and lead vocalist and co-founder of German pop band Klee
- Sven Bensmann, Musician, comedian and presenter
- Tabea Grün, Singer
- Tallana Gabriel, Singer and model
- Thomas Katrozan, Singer
- Thomas Wohlfahrt, Singer and musician
- Tialda van Slogteren, Singer, model, TV actress and former member of the Room 2012
- Tomasz Reichelt "Diva Tomasz", Singer and dancer
- Timo Scharf, Singer
- Tobias Haase, Singer, songwriter and director
- Tony Fazio, Singer
- Verena Mackenberg, member of the group The Pearlettes
- Viktoria Savenko, Singer and songwriter
- Wanda Kay, Schlager singer
- Yasmin Reese, Singer
