= Connie Francis Sings German Favorites =

Connie Francis sings German Favorites

Studio album by Connie Francis
- Released: January 1964
- Recorded: June 21, 1960; March 14–15, 1961; June 3, 1961; April 12–14, 1962; February 5–6, 1963
- Genre: Pop
- Label: MGM; E-4124 (mono)/SE-4124 (stereo)
- Producer: Danny Davis, Gerhard Mendelsohn

Connie Francis chronology
| In the Summer of His Years (1963) | Connie Francis sings German Favorites (1964) | Looking for Love (1964) |

Connie Francis sings German Favorites is a studio album of German songs recorded by American entertainer Connie Francis.

== Background ==
Unlike the other installments in Francis' series of "Favorites" albums, Connie Francis sings German Favorites does not focus on the traditional songs of a certain country or ethnic group. Beginning in 1960 with the overwhelming success of Die Liebe ist ein seltsames Spiel, a German version of her U.S. No. 1 hit Everybody's Somebody's Fool, Francis had established herself in Germany as a respected performer of contemporary German music. By the time of the album's release, Francis had enjoyed six No. 1 hits on the German charts. Hence, Connie Francis sings German Favorites is more of a typical pop Greatest Hits Album.

Originally scheduled for release in late spring 1963, the album was not released until January 1964 because of the delayed release of Francis' 1962 album Connie Francis sings Award Winning Motion Picture Hits, which had been scheduled for release in June 1962 but did not hit the shops until May 1963.

== Track listing ==
=== Side A ===
| # | Title | Songwriter | Length |
|---|---|---|---|
| 1. | "Wenn du gehst" | Werner Scharfenberger, Fini Busch | 2.39 |
| 2. | "Eine Insel für zwei" | Charly Niessen, Joachim Relin | 2.09 |
| 3. | "Die Liebe ist ein seltsames Spiel" | Howard Greenfield, Jack Keller, Ralph Maria Siegel | 2.38 |
| 4. | "Tu' mir nicht weh" | Ted Murry, Benny Davis, Fini Busch | 2.58 |
| 5. | "Barcarole in der Nacht" | Werner Scharfenberger, Kurt Feltz | 2.02 |
| 6. | "Nino" | Werner Scharfenberger, Fini Busch | 2.32 |

=== Side B ===
| # | Title | Songwriter | Length |
|---|---|---|---|
| 1. | "Paradiso" | Wolfgang Zell | 2.39 |
| 2. | "Colombino" | Charly Niessen, Joachim Relin | 2.42 |
| 3. | "Immer und überall" | Erwin Halletz, Peter Wehle | 2.25 |
| 4. | "Schöner fremder Mann" | Athina Hosey, Hal Gordon, Jean Nicolas | 2.41 |
| 5. | "Gondola d'amore" | Charly Niessen, Joachim Relin | 2.36 |
| 6. | "Die Nacht ist mein (Tonight's my Night)" | Ted Murry, Benny Davis, Fini Busch | 2.34 |
| 7. | "Lili Marleen" | Norbert Schultze, Hans Leip | 1.51 |
