= Einmal komm' ich wieder =

Single by Connie Francis
- B-side: "Immer und überall"
- Released: 1961
- Recorded: March 14, 1961 at Austrophon Studio, Vienna
- Genre: Schlager
- Length: 2:27
- Label: MGM 61 044
- Songwriters: Werner Scharfenberger, Fini Busch
- Producer: Gerhard Mendelsohn

Connie Francis German singles chronology
"Schöner fremder Mann" (1961)	"Einmal komm' ich wieder" (1961)	"Eine Insel für zwei" (1961)

Einmal komm' ich wieder is the fifth German single recorded by U. S. entertainer Connie Francis.

== Background ==
After all her previous German singles had been cover versions of her U. S. hits, Einmal komm' ich wieder was the first single to feature two songs written especially in German.

== Overview ==
The A-side, Einmal komm' ich wieder (which translates to Some day I'll return), was written by Werner Scharfenberger (music) and Fini Busch (lyrics) who had many hits to their credits as a songwriting team, such as the 1960 Seemann, deine Heimat ist das Meer which had been a sensational # 5 on the U. S. charts for Lolita. The song's composer, Werner Scharfenberger, also conducted the recording which took place March 15, 1961, at Austrophon Studio, located in the basement of Vienna's Konzerthaus.

The single's B-Side, Immer und überall (meaning Always and everywhere) was composed by Erwin Halletz, an Austrian orchestra leader whose credits – among many songs for the record market – include several operettas and musicals as well as many highly successful motion picture scores.

When Einmal komm' ich wieder was released, it peaked at No. 11 on the German charts. In the wake of this success, Francis started to record compositions of German origin regularly until her contract with MGM Records ended in 1969. Werner Scharfenberger and Fini Busch as well as Scharfenberger and his second songwriting partner, Kurt Feltz, became Francis' favorite songwriting teams for the German market although she also recorded songs written by other composers. Francis also continued to record German cover versions of her U. S. hits but less frequently than before.

Although it failed to chart, the single's B-side, Immer und überall, was included in 1964 on Francis' album Connie Francis sings German Favorites, a compilation of Francis' greatest German hits up to that date, instead of Einmal komm' ich wieder.
