= Canta Comigo season 3 =

Canta Comigo
- Season 3
- Presented by: Rodrigo Faro
- Judges: See The 100
- Winner: Braunna Siblings
- Runner-up: Angélica Sansone

Release
- Original network: Netflix; RecordTV
- Original release: April 25 – July 11, 2021

Season chronology
- ← Previous; Season 2 Next → Season 4

The third season of Canta Comigo was first released on Friday, April 23, 2021, on Netflix, premiering on RecordTV two days later, on Sunday, April 25, 2021, at 6:00 / 5:00 p.m. (BRT / AMT).

Rodrigo Faro, who had already hosted the first season of the teen series in 2020, replaced Gugu Liberato as the main series host.

On July 11, 2021, Camila and Pablo Braunna, known as Braunna Siblings, won the competition with 42.57% of the public vote over Angélica Sansone (35.26%) and André Luis (22.20%), thus becoming the first duo to win the show worldwide.

== Heats ==
Key
– Artist advanced to the finals with an all-100 stand up
– Artist advanced to the semifinals the highest score
– Artist advanced to the sing-off in either 2nd or 3rd place
– Artist score enough points to place in the Top 3 but was moved out and eliminated
– Artist didn't score enough points to place in the Top 3 and was directly eliminated
– Artist was eliminated but received the judges' save and advanced to the wildcard

=== Heat 1 ===
Order	Artist	Song	Score	Place	Result
1	Joy Rayane	"Divino, Maravilhoso"	75	1st	Eliminated
2	Junior Karrerah	"Don't Let the Sun Go Down on Me"	99	1st	Advanced
3	Eliane Pereira	"O Amor e o Poder (The Power of Love)"	84	2nd	Eliminated
4	David e Mateus	"Festa Louca"	80	3rd	Eliminated
5	Letícia Soares	"We Don't Need Another Hero (Thunderdome)"	100	—	Finalist
6	Didi Gomes	"O Bêbado e a Equilibrista"	96	2nd	Advanced
7	Tarzan	"The House of the Rising Sun"	51	—	Eliminated
8	Concê	"Dê Um Rolê"	90	3rd	Advanced
9	Maurinho Vai Rolar	"Sorriso Negro"	100	—	Finalist
10	André Di Barros	"Bridge over Troubled Water"	84	—	Eliminated

Sing-off details

Order	Artist	Song	Score	Place	Result
1	Concê	"Disk Me"	81	—	Eliminated
2	Didi Gomes	"Sorriso Aberto"	94	1st	Advanced

=== Heat 2 ===
Order	Artist	Song	Score	Place	Result
1	Luciana Arouca	"Man! I Feel Like a Woman!"	90	1st	Eliminated
2	Nethynha Bardo	"Asa Branca"	98	1st	Wildcard
3	André Moreira	"Balada do Louco"	51	3rd	Eliminated
4	Letícia Helena	"Total Eclipse of the Heart"	98	2nd^{^{1}}	Wildcard
5	Denilson Aquiles	"Você Não Me Ensinou a Te Esquecer"	77	—	Eliminated
6	Dalney Mekson	"I Heard It Through the Grapevine"	92	3rd	Wildcard
7	Braunna Siblings	"I Want You Back"	99	1st	Advanced
8	Ana Caroline	"A Lenda"	56	—	Eliminated
9	Dilma Oliveira	"Como Dois e Dois"	98	2nd^{^{2}}	Advanced
10	Nyll	"I Believe I Can Fly"	99	1st^{^{3}}	Advanced

- ^Note 1 : Tie between Letícia Helena and Nethynha Bardo for 1st. Nethynha won 51–49. Luciana Arouca moved (3rd); André Moreira eliminated.
- ^Note 2 : Tie between Dilma Oliveira, Letícia Helena and Nethynha Bardo for 2nd/3rd. Dilma won 61–39 against Letícia for 3rd (Letícia Helena eliminated); then, Dilma won 61–39 against Nethynha for 2nd.
- ^Note 3 : Tie between Braunna Siblings and Nyll for 1st. Nyll won 63–37. Dilma Oliveira moved (3rd); Nethynha Bardo eliminated.

Sing-off details

Order	Artist	Song	Score	Place	Result
1	Dilma Oliveira	"Estranha Loucura"	100	—	Finalist
2	Braunna Siblings	—	—	1st	Advanced

=== Heat 3 ===
Order	Artist	Song	Score	Place	Result
1	Luan Lemos	"Amor Perfeito"	78	1st	Eliminated
2	Two Marias	"Fascinação (Fascination)"	88	1st	Eliminated
3	Dudu Nicastro	"Valerie"	88	1st^{^{4}}	Advanced
4	Sâmia Acras	"Se Você Pensa"	83	3rd	Eliminated
5	Thiago Millores	"Love of My Life"	99	1st	Advanced
6	José Ramos Jr.	"Chorando Se Foi (Lambada)"	90	2nd	Advanced
7	Charlie Diéf	"Explode Coração"	100	—	Finalist
8	Anamara	"Escrito Nas Estrelas"	67	—	Eliminated
9	Debora Rodrigues	"Don't You Worry 'bout a Thing"	100	—	Finalist
10	Ariane Ramalho	"I Love Rock 'n' Roll"	87	—	Eliminated

- ^Note 4 : Tie between Dudu Nicastro and Two Marias for 1st. Dudu won 51–49.

Sing-off details

Order	Artist	Song	Score	Place	Result
1	Dudu Nicastro	"Mercy"	49	—	Eliminated
2	José Ramos Jr.	"Ai Que Saudade d'Ocê"	88	1st	Advanced

=== Heat 4 ===
Order	Artist	Song	Score	Place	Result
1	Bel Lima	"I Just Called to Say I Love You"	93	1st	Advanced
2	Gabriela Bork	"O Amor Não Deixa"	40	2nd	Eliminated
3	Raffa Castro	"Without You"	95	1st	Advanced
4	Duo Us Dias	"Luar do Sertão"	91	3rd	Wildcard
5	Inamara	"Eye of the Tiger"	74	—	Eliminated
6	Douglas Espindola	"Estrada da Vida"	67	—	Eliminated
7	Thalia Abdon	"It Must Have Been Love"	65	—	Eliminated
8	Thiago Elias	"Wherever You Will Go"	58	—	Eliminated
9	Caiuby	"Tá Escrito"	92	3rd	Advanced
10	Angélica Sansone	"Maria, Maria"	100	—	Finalist

Sing-off details

Order	Artist	Song	Score	Place	Result
1	Caiuby	"Conselho"	82	1st	Advanced
2	Bel Lima	"Alma Gêmea"	64	—	Wildcard

=== Heat 5 ===
Order	Artist	Song	Score	Place	Result
1	Gandaia Duo	"Só Love"	92	1st	Advanced
2	Renato Cezar	"'O sole mio"	100	—	Finalist
3	Gabriel Zoldan	"Counting Stars"	56	2nd	Eliminated
4	Lud Mazzucatti	"I'm Every Woman"	74	2nd	Eliminated
5	Natália Masih	"As Quatro Estações"	72	3rd	Eliminated
6	Kauê Damazzio	"Mirrors"	87	2nd	Eliminated
7	Daniel Santos	"Rock with You"	97	1st	Advanced
8	Lara Castro	"Firework"	92	3rd^{^{5}}	Advanced
9	Iaponira Bezerra	"É Tarde Demais"	89	—	Eliminated
10	Wagner Jovanaci	"She"	83	—	Eliminated

- ^Note 5 : Tie between Gandaia Duo and Lara Castro for 2nd. Gandaia Duo won 51–49. Kauê Damazzio was eliminated.

Sing-off details

Order	Artist	Song	Score	Place	Result
1	Lara Castro	"Need You Now"	98	1st	Advanced
2	Gandaia Duo	"Fricote"	75	—	Eliminated

=== Heat 6 ===
Order	Artist	Song	Score	Place	Result
1	Théo	"Sujeito de Sorte"	92	1st	Wildcard
2	Daniela Montuori	"Riptide"	90	2nd	Eliminated
3	Giovana Portella	"Alô, Alô Marciano"	96	1st	Advanced
4	Arthur Raimundo	"You Raise Me Up"	68	—	Eliminated
5	Marília Nunes Cortes	"You Oughta Know"	95	2nd	Advanced
6	Diego Malane	"São Gonça"	73	—	Eliminated
7	Thaís & Isaque	"Ain't No Mountain High Enough"	100	—	Finalist
8	Samantha Apolinário	"A Thousand Years"	89	—	Eliminated
9	Yolanda de Paulo	"I Just Want to Make Love to You"	98	1st	Advanced
10	Marco Antônio Lara	"As Rosas Não Falam"	100	—	Finalist

Sing-off details

Order	Artist	Song	Score	Place	Result
1	Marília Nunes Cortes	"É o Amor"	64	—	Wildcard
2	Giovana Portella	"At Last"	98	1st	Advanced

=== Heat 7 ===
Order	Artist	Song	Score	Place	Result
1	Nayara Yumi	"Umbrella"	100	—	Finalist
2	Mayara Luna	"Torn"	93	1st	Advanced
3	Vanessa Brown	"Son of a Preacher Man"	96	1st	Advanced
4	Gustavo Salles	"Deslizes"	92	3rd	Eliminated
5	Ricardo Hora	"Cilada"	83	—	Wildcard
6	Helen Cristina	"Não Quero Mais"	56	—	Eliminated
7	Débora Machado	"Cryin"	63	—	Eliminated
8	Corcel	"Já Sei Namorar"	51	—	Eliminated
9	Ronie Suárez	"Thinking Out Loud"	95	2nd	Advanced
10	Ayana	"Ex Mai Love"	67	—	Eliminated

Sing-off details

Order	Artist	Song	Score	Place	Result
1	Mayara Luna	"Complicated"	93	—	Wildcard
2	Ronie Suárez	"Dona"	99	1st	Advanced

=== Heat 8 ===
Order	Artist	Song	Score	Place	Result
1	Gael	"Oops!... I Did It Again"	99	1st	Advanced
2	Ruan & Molina	"Só Dá Você na Minha Vida"	95	2nd	Wildcard
3	Zu Laiê	"Canta Brasil"	97	2nd	Advanced
4	Léo Torrieri	"Proud Mary"	99	2nd^{^{6}}	Advanced
5	Evellyn Souza	"No One"	86	—	Eliminated
6	André Luis	"Bandolins"	100	—	Finalist
7	Belá Bacelar	"Qui Nem Jiló"	90	—	Wildcard
8	Nana Rodrigues	"Always Remember Us This Way"	59	—	Eliminated
9	Trevo'z	"Step by Step"	82	—	Eliminated
10	Sarah Ávila	"I Say a Little Prayer"	86	—	Wildcard

- ^Note 6 : Tie between Gael and Léo Torrieri for 1st. Gael won 79–21. Zu Laiê moved (3rd); Ruan & Molina were eliminated.

Sing-off details

Order	Artist	Song	Score	Place	Result
1	Zu Laiê	"Swing da Cor"	85	1st	Advanced
2	Léo Torrieri	"Página de Amigos"	50	—	Wildcard

== Wildcard ==
Order	Artist	Song	Score	Place	Result
1	Ricardo Hora	"Retalhos de Cetim"	99	1st	Advanced
2	Mayara Luna	"Highway to Hell"	92	2nd	Eliminated
3	Duo Us Dias	"Vaqueiro de Profissão"	76	3rd	Eliminated
4	Marília Nunes Cortes	"Thriller"	49	—	Eliminated
5	Bel Lima	"Jorge Maravilha"	98	2nd	Advanced
6	Théo	"Um Dia, um Adeus"	67	—	Eliminated
7	Letícia Helena	"Listen to Your Heart"	81	—	Eliminated
8	Nethynha Bardo	"Abandonada"	100	—	Advanced
9	Ruan & Molina	"New York"	89	—	Eliminated
10	Léo Torrieri	"Born to Be Wild"	98	3rd^{^{7}}	Eliminated
11	Belá Bacelar	"Espumas ao Vento"	82	—	Eliminated
12	Sarah Ávila	"Let's Stay Together"	61	—	Eliminated
13	Dalney Mekson	"Ovelha Negra"	98	2nd^{^{8}}	Advanced

- ^Note 7 : Tie between Bel Lima and Léo Torrieri for 2nd. Bel won 58–42. Mayara Luna was eliminated.
- ^Note 8 : Tie between Dalney Mekson, Bel Lima, Léo Torrieri for 2nd/3rd. Dalney won 65–35 against Léo for 3rd (Léo Torrieri eliminated); then, Dalney won 64–36 against Bel for 2nd.

Sing-off details

Order	Artist	Song	Score	Place	Result
1	Bel Lima	"O Mundo é Um Moinho"	85	—	Eliminated
2	Dalney Mekson	"Meu Mundo e Nada Mais"	89	1st	Advanced

== Semifinals ==
Prior to filming, Daniel Santos (Heat 5 winner) was disqualified from the competition after having tested positive for COVID-19.

=== Week 1 ===
Order	Artist	Song	Score	Place	Result
1	Braunna Siblings	"Olhos Coloridos"	99	1st	Advanced
2	Lara Castro	"Talking to the Moon"	88	2nd	Eliminated
3	Caiuby	"Domingo"	87	3rd	Eliminated
4	Zu Laiê	"Força Estranha"	61	—	Eliminated
5	Gael	"Un-Break My Heart"	95	2nd	Eliminated
6	Giovanna Portella	"Can't Stop Lovin' You"	97	2nd	Eliminated
7	José Ramos Jr.	"Homem Com H"	64	—	Eliminated
8	Vanessa Brown	"Killing Me Softly with His Song"	100	1st	Advanced
9	Junior Karrerah	"Caruso"	98	3rd	Advanced

Sing-off details

Order	Artist	Song	Score	Place	Result
1	Junior Karrerah	"Against All Odds"	88	—	Eliminated
2	Braunna Siblings	"One Sweet Day"	90	1st	Advanced

=== Week 2 ===
Order	Artist	Song	Score	Place	Result
1	Thiago Millores	"When a Man Loves a Woman"	98	1st	Advanced
2	Didi Gomes	"Andança"	90	2nd	Eliminated
3	Ricardo Hora	"I Look To You"	92	2nd	Eliminated
4	Ronie Suárez	"Não Vou Ficar"	85	—	Eliminated
5	Dalney Mekson	"Born This Way"	90	3rd^{^{9}}	Eliminated
6	Yolanda de Paulo	"You And I"	95	2nd	Eliminated
7	Raffa Castro	"Heaven"	92	—^{^{10}}	Eliminated
8	Nethynha Bardo	"Boate Azul"	100	1st	Advanced
9	Nyll	"I Got You (I Feel Good)"	97	3rd	Advanced

- ^Note 9 : Tie between Dalney Mekson and Didi Gomes for 3rd. Dalney won 55–45, so Didi Gomes was eliminated.
- ^Note 10 : Tie between Raffa Castro e Ricardo Hora for 3rd. Ricardo won 55–45, so Raffa Castro was eliminated.

Sing-off details

Order	Artist	Song	Score	Place	Result
1	Nyll	"Believe"	89	1st	Advanced
2	Thiago Millores	"Every Breath You Take"	65	—	Eliminated

== Finals ==
Prior to filming, Dilma Oliveira (Heat 2 finalist) was disqualified from the competition after having tested positive for COVID-19.

Order	Artist	Song	Score	Place	Result
1	Nethynha Bardo	"Disparada"	91	1st	Eliminated
2	Maurinho Vai Rolar	"Malandro"	79	2nd	Eliminated
3	Letícia Soares	"River Deep – Mountain High"	99	1st	Eliminated
4	Braunna Siblings	"Ciclo Sem Fim (Circle of Life)"	100	1st	Advanced
5	Nyll	"Listen to the Music"	80	—	Eliminated
6	Débora Rodrigues	"We Are The World"	68	—	Eliminated
7	Charlie Diéf	"Isso É Fundo de Quintal"	100	2nd^{^{11}}	Eliminated
8	Thaís & Isaque	"The Way You Make Me Feel"	99	3rd	Eliminated
9	Angélica Sansone	"(You Make Me Feel Like) A Natural Woman"	100	1st^{^{12}}	Advanced
10	Renato Cezar	"Torna a Surriento"	99	—	Eliminated
11	André Luis	"Onde Deus Possa Me Ouvir"	100	2nd^{^{13}}	Advanced
12	Nayara Yumi	"Crazy in Love"	78	—	Eliminated
13	Marco Antônio Lara	"Os Amantes"	97	—	Eliminated
14	Vanessa Brown	"Respect"	88	—	Eliminated

- ^Note 11 : Tie between Braunna Siblings and Charlie Diéf for 1st. The Braunna Siblings won 67–33. Letícia Soares moved (3rd); Nethynha Bardo eliminated.
- ^Note 12 : Thaís & Isaque eliminated as result of a tie between Angélica Sansone, Braunna Siblings and Charlie Diéf for 1st/2nd; Angélica won 84–16 against Charlie for 2nd, moving him to 3rd; then, Angélica also won 66–34 against the Braunna Siblings for 1st.
- ^Note 13 : Tie between André Luis, Angélica Sansone, Braunna Siblings and Charlie Diéf for 1st/2nd/3rd. André won 80–20 against Charlie for 3rd, thus eliminating him; then, André also won 52–48 against the Braunna Siblings for 2nd, moving them to 3rd; ultimately, Angélica won 75–25 against André and secured herself in 1st.

Sing-off details

Order	Artist	Song	Score	Place	Result
1	Braunna Siblings	"Endless Love"	100	1st	Winners
2	André Luis	"Linda Demais"	100	3rd	Third place
3	Angélica Sansone	"It's Raining Men"	100	2nd	Runner-up

== Elimination chart ==
Key

Winner
Runner-up
Third place

Advanced
In sing-off

Immunity
Eliminated

Artist	Semifinals 1		Semifinals 2		Finals	
Artist	Qualifying	Sing-off	Qualifying	Sing-off	Qualifying	Sing-off
Braunna Siblings	2nd 99 points	1st 90 points			3rd 100 points	Winners; 42.57%
Angélica Sansone					1st 100 points	Runner-up; 35.26%
André Luis					2nd 100 points	Third place 22.20%
Charlie Diéf					4th 100 points	
Letícia Soares					5th–7th 99 points	
Renato Cezar					5th–7th 99 points	
Thaís & Isaque					5th–7th 99 points	
Marco Antônio Lara					8th 97 points	
Nethynha Bardo			1st 100 points	Immune	9th 91 points	
Vanessa Brown	1st 100 points	Immune			10th 88 points	
Nyll			3rd 97 points	1st 89 points	11th 80 points	
Maurinho Vai Rolar					12th 79 points	
Nayara Yumi					13th 78 points	
Debora Rodrigues					14th 68 points	
Dilma Oliveira					Disqualified (COVID-19)	
Thiago Millores			2nd 98 points	2nd 65 points		
Yolanda de Paulo			4th 95 points			
Ricardo Hora			5th 92 points			
Raffa Castro			6th 92 points			
Dalney Mekson			7th 90 points			
Didi Gomes			8th 90 points			
Ronie Suárez			9th 85 points			
Junior Karrerah	3rd 98 points	2nd 89 points				
Giovana Portella	4th 97 points					
Gael	5th 95 points					
Lara Castro	6th 88 points					
Caiuby	7th 87 points					
José Ramos Jr.	8th 64 points					
Zu Laiê	9th 61 points					
Daniel Santos	Disqualified (COVID-19)					

== Ratings and reception ==
=== Brazilian ratings ===
All numbers are in points and provided by Kantar Ibope Media.

Episode	Title	Air date	Timeslot (BRT)	SP viewers (in points)	Source
1	Heat 1	April 25, 2021	Sunday 6:00 p.m.	7.1	
2	Heat 2	May 2, 2021	Sunday 6:00 p.m.	7.2	
3	Heat 3	May 9, 2021	Sunday 6:00 p.m.	6.7	
4	Heat 4	May 16, 2021	Sunday 6:00 p.m.	7.7	
5	Heat 5	May 23, 2021	Sunday 6:00 p.m.	7.0	
6	Heat 6	May 30, 2021	Sunday 6:00 p.m.	7.6	
7	Heat 7	June 6, 2021	Sunday 6:00 p.m.	6.9	
8	Heat 8	June 13, 2021	Sunday 6:00 p.m.	7.6	
9	Wildcard	June 20, 2021	Sunday 6:00 p.m.	7.8	
10	Semifinals 1	June 27, 2021	Sunday 6:00 p.m.	7.8	
11	Semifinals 2	July 4, 2021	Sunday 6:00 p.m.	8.6	
12	Finals	July 11, 2021	Sunday 6:00 p.m.	8.0	

- In 2021, each point represents 268.278 households in 15 market cities in Brazil (76.577 households in São Paulo).
