= Canta Comigo season 2 =

Canta Comigo
- Season 2
- Presented by: Gugu Liberato
- Judges: See The 100
- Winner: Franson
- Runner-up: Débora Neves

Release
- Original network: RecordTV
- Original release: September 25 – December 4, 2019

Season chronology
- ← Previous; Season 1 Next → Season 3

The second season of Canta Comigo premiered on September 25, 2019 at 11:00 p.m. (BRT / AMT) on RecordTV.

On November 21, 2019, host Gugu Liberato suffered an accident at his home in Orlando, Florida, where he fell from the roof of his house and hit his head. He was admitted to Orlando Health and it was reported that his condition was critical. Rumors of his death were initially denied, but the next day, on November 22, it was confirmed that Gugu had died.

As the season was fully completed months before Gugu's death (as three alternate endings with each finalist being crowned winner were filmed), RecordTV decided to air the final two episodes as a tribute. On December 4, 2019, Franson won the competition with 72.80% of the public vote over Débora Neves (16.09%) and group Threerapia (11.11%).

== Heats ==
Key
– Artist advanced to the finals with an all-100 stand up
– Artist advanced to the semifinals with the highest score
– Artist advanced to the sing-off in either 2nd or 3rd place
– Artist score enough points to place in the Top 3 but was moved out and eliminated
– Artist didn't score enough points to place in the Top 3 and was directly eliminated
– Artist was eliminated but received the judges' save and advanced to the wildcard

=== Heat 1 ===
Order	Artist	Song	Score	Place	Result
1	Diego Toledo	"Obrigado"	99	1st	Advanced
2	Renata Moraes	"Night Eyes"	78	2nd	Wildcard
3	Lobão	"A Voz da Honestidade"	97	2nd	Advanced
4	Caio Sampaio	"Vidas Rasgadas"	60	—	Eliminated
5	Marcela Teresa	"Coração Ardente"	95	2nd	Advanced
6	Rogério Nunes	"Game Over"	73	—	Eliminated
7	Léo Nogueira	"Hostel"	86	—	Eliminated
8	Ajuste	"Foguete em Alto Nível"	100	—	Finalist
9	Gabriel Pires	"Sem Nada"	81	—	Eliminated

Sing-off details

Order	Artist	Song	Score	Place	Result
1	Lobão	"Sangue Noturno"	97	1st	Advanced
2	Marcela Teresa	"Inocêncio"	85	—	Wildcard

=== Heat 2 ===
Order	Artist	Song	Score	Place	Result
1	Leo Vato & Vanessa Lee	"(I've Had) The Time of My Life"	81	1st^{^{1}}	Eliminated
2	Lucas Molina	"Notificação Preferida"	52	2nd	Eliminated
3	Steph Cucato	"Over the Rainbow"	60	2nd	Eliminated
4	Lukas Kim	"Sem Ar"	91	1st	Advanced
5	Débora Neves	"Con te partirò"	100	—	Finalist
6	Anderson Ribeiro	"Pra Sempre Vou te Amar"	98	1st	Advanced
7	Heloisa Lucas	"Hit the Road Jack"	81	3rd^{^{1}}	Eliminated
8	Nathalie Salviano	"A Lenda"	59	—	Eliminated
9	Lucas Fozzati	"Dancing On My Own"	93	2nd	Advanced

^Note 1: Tie between Leo Vato & Vanessa Lee and Heloisa Lucas for 3rd. Heloisa won 81–19. Leo Vato & Vanessa Lee were eliminated.

Sing-off details

Order	Artist	Song	Score	Place	Result
1	Lucas Kim	"Gostava Tanto de Você"	83	—	Wildcard
2	Lucas Fozzati	"João de Barro"	89	1st	Advanced

=== Heat 3 ===
Order	Artist	Song	Score	Place	Result
1	Octavio Lisboa	"Ciclo Sem Fim"	77	1st^{^{2}}	Eliminated
2	Julie Ramos	"Aquele Abraço"	49	2nd	Eliminated
3	Pedro Mussum	"Hero"	100	—	Finalist
4	Annyria Wailer	"Simples Desejo"	61	2nd	Eliminated
5	Mily Taormina	"When I Was Your Man"	90	1st	Advanced
6	Liloh	"Falando Sério"	74	3rd	Eliminated
7	Tiago Prado	"Crazy in Love"	94	1st	Advanced
8	Jill Reis	"Meu Sangue Ferve Por Você"	77	3rd^{^{2}}	Advanced
9	Bruno Vincenzi	"Fly Me to the Moon"	100	—	Finalist

^Note 2: Tie between Octavio Lisboa and Jill Reis for 3rd. Jill won 63–37. Octavio Lisboa was eliminated.

Sing-off details

Order	Artist	Song	Score	Place	Result
1	Jill Reis	"Essa Tal Liberdade"	64	—	Eliminated
2	Mily Taormina	"Killing Me Softly"	89	1st	Advanced

=== Heat 4 ===
Order	Artist	Song	Score	Place	Result
1	Bella Nogueira	"This Love"	82	1st	Wildcard
2	Fezaka	"Do Seu Lado"	32	2nd	Eliminated
3	Ale Chris	"Mercedes Benz"	93	1st^{^{3}}	Advanced
4	Guime	"I'll Never Fall in Love Again"	95	1st	Advanced
5	Gabi Warlet	"Believer"	57	—	Eliminated
6	P7	"Ouvi Dizer"	93	3rd^{^{3}}	Eliminated
7	Franson	"Eternal Flame"	94	2nd	Advanced
8	Nat Ventura	"Ovelha Negra"	51	—	Eliminated
9	Anna Barros	"Forró do Xenhenhém"	92	—	Wildcard

^Note 3: Tie between Ale Chris and P7 for 2nd. Ale won 54–46. Bella Nogueira was eliminated.

Sing-off details

Order	Artist	Song	Score	Place	Result
1	Ale Chris	"Zombie"	54	—	Wildcard
2	Franson	"I Can See Clearly Now"	94	1st	Advanced

=== Heat 5 ===
Order	Artist	Song	Score	Place	Result
1	Thor Junior	"Me Dê Motivo"	98	1st^{^{4}}	Advanced
2	Joy	"Halo"	36	2nd	Eliminated
3	Pedro Falcão	"Telegrama"	29	3rd	Eliminated
4	Samantha Carmona	"Um Anjo Veio Me Falar"	90	2nd	Eliminated
5	Becah	"Boa Menina"	21	—	Eliminated
6	Gabriel Mefe	"I Don't Want to Miss a Thing"	56	3rd	Eliminated
7	Raquel Diniz	"Encontros e Despedidas"	92	2nd	Advanced
8	Rose Barcellos	"Andança"	98	1st^{^{4}}	Advanced
9	Belloti & Vianna	"Minha Estrela Perdida"	36	—	Eliminated

^Note 3: Tie between Thor Junior and Rose Barcellos for 1st. Rose won 73–27. Raquel moved (3rd); Samantha Carmona eliminated.

Sing-off details

Order	Artist	Song	Score	Place	Result
1	Raquel Diniz	"Coleção"	58	—	Wildcard
2	Thor Junior	"Um Dia de Domingo"	87	1st	Advanced

=== Heat 6 ===
Order	Artist	Song	Score	Place	Result
1	Dandara Alves	"Alguém me Avisou"	95	1st	Advanced
2	Mayer Brothers	"Morena"	81	2nd	Eliminated
3	Real Trio Vocal	"The Best"	70	3rd	Eliminated
4	Lucas Godoy	"Nascemos para Cantar"	61	—	Eliminated
5	Rodolfo Ribeiro	"Codinome Beija-Flor"	97	1st	Advanced
6	Camila Reis	"Era Uma Vez"	98	1st	Advanced
7	Nina Guimarães	"Velha Roupa Colorida"	100	—	Finalist
8	Enjoyce	"Dona de Mim"	52	—	Eliminated
9	Paula Oliveira	"Vou Festejar"	24	—	Eliminated

Sing-off details

Order	Artist	Song	Score	Place	Result
1	Dandara Alves	"Versos Simples"	47	1st	Advanced
2	Rodolfo Ribeiro	"De Volta pro Aconchego"	100	—	Finalist

=== Heat 7 ===
Order	Artist	Song	Score	Place	Result
1	Tide Junqueira	"I Wish I Knew How It Would Feel to Be Free"	45	1st	Eliminated
2	Sara Milca	"Quando Chove"	80	1st	Advanced
3	Rodrigo Mello	"Easy"	99	1st	Advanced
4	Fabricia Lees	"Price Tag"	54	3rd	Eliminated
5	Murilo & Benício	"Amor Perfeito"	77	3rd	Eliminated
6	Samya Nalany	"Palco"	87	2nd	Advanced
7	Igor Black	"No Meu Coração Você Vai Sempre Estar"	78	—	Eliminated
8	Gustavo Sanches	"Chão de Giz"	71	—	Wildcard
9	Real	"Amor I Love You"	54	—	Eliminated

Sing-off details

Order	Artist	Song	Score	Place	Result
1	Sara Milca	"Nada Mais"	63	—	Wildcard
2	Samya Nalany	"Palpite"	95	1st	Advanced

== Wildcard ==
Order	Artist	Song	Score	Place	Result
1	Ale Chris	"Like a Prayer"	52	1st	Eliminated
2	Raquel Diniz	"Disparada"	86	1st	Advanced
3	Lukas Kim	"You Raise Me Up"	100	—	Finalist
4	Gabi Honorato	"Se Deus Me Ouvisse"	69	2nd	Eliminated
5	Anna Barros	"Eu Só Quero Um Xodó"	93	1st	Advanced
6	Gustavo Sanches	"Whisky a Go Go"	44	—	Eliminated
7	Sara Milca	"Beautiful"	21	—	Eliminated
8	Bella Nogueira	"Suddenly I See"	79	3rd	Eliminated
9	MC Mayarah	"O Amor e o Poder (The Power of Love)"	88	2nd	Advanced

Sing-off details

Order	Artist	Song	Score	Place	Result
1	Raquel Diniz	"Carinhoso"	67	—	Eliminated
2	MC Mayarah	"Bom"	74	1st	Advanced

== Semifinals ==
=== Week 1 ===
Order	Artist	Song	Score	Place	Result
1	Camila Reis	"Final Feliz"	94	1st	Advanced
2	Lucas Fozatti	"Always"	98	1st	Advanced
3	Anderson Ribeiro	"Careless Whisper"	59	3rd	Eliminated
4	Rose Barcellos	"Bye Bye Tristeza"	93	3rd	Eliminated
5	Mily Taormina	"Vivo por Ella"	91	—	Eliminated
6	Guime	"Unchained Melody"	78	—	Eliminated
7	Rodrigo Cabral	"Como Vai Você"	97	2nd	Advanced
8	Thor Junior	"O Tempo Não Para"	81	—	Eliminated

Sing-off details

Order	Artist	Song	Score	Place	Result
1	Camila Reis	"Fim de Tarde"	90	1st	Advanced
2	Rodrigo Cabral	"Bohemian Rhapsody"	72	—	Eliminated

=== Week 2 ===
Order	Artist	Song	Score	Place	Result
1	Tiago Prado	"Who Wants to Live Forever"	89	1st	Advanced
2	Leonel	"No Dia em que Sai de Casa"	83	2nd	Eliminated
3	MC Mayarah	"Tremendo Vacilão"	68	3rd	Eliminated
4	Rodrigo Mello	"Corazón Partío"	78	3rd	Eliminated
5	Franson	"Heal the World"	99	1st	Advanced
6	Anna Barros	"Frevo Mulher"	70	—	Eliminated
7	Dandara Alves	"Coisinha do Pai"	76	—	Eliminated
8	Samya Nalany	"River Deep – Mountain High"	84	3rd	Advanced

Sing-off details

Order	Artist	Song	Score	Place	Result
1	Samya Nalany	"O Bêbado e a Equilibrista"	70	1st	Advanced
2	Tiago Prado	"When We Were Young"	53	—	Eliminated

== Finals ==
- Group performance: "Don't Stop Me Now"

Order	Artist	Song	Score	Place	Result
1	Nina Guimarães	"Piece of My Heart"	74	1st	Eliminated
2	Bruno Vincenzi	"Come Fly with Me"	89	1st	Eliminated
3	Lukas Kim	"Because of You"	43	3rd	Eliminated
4	Threerapia	"We Are the Champions"	99	1st	Advanced
5	Camila Reis	"A Lua Q Eu Te Dei"	90	2nd	Eliminated
6	Franson	"Stand by Me"	96	2nd	Advanced
7	Rodolfo Ribeiro	"Papel Colorido"	73	—	Eliminated
8	Samya Nalany	"Ben"	67	—	Eliminated
9	Pedro Mussum	"Run to You"	93	3rd	Eliminated
10	Débora Neves	"O mio babbino caro"	98	2nd	Advanced
11	Lucas Fozatti	"Someone Like You"	66	—	Eliminated

Sing-off details

Order	Artist	Song	Score	Place	Result
1	Franson	"I Just Called to Say I Love You"	100	1st	Winner
2	Débora Neves	"How Can I Go On"	100	2nd	Runner-up
3	Threerapia	"Emotion"	100	3rd	Third place

== Elimination chart ==
Key

Winner
Runner-up
Third place

Advanced
In sing-off

Immunity
Eliminated

Artist	Semifinals 1		Semifinals 2		Finals	
Artist	Qualifying	Sing-off	Qualifying	Sing-off	Qualifying	Sing-off
Franson			1st 99 points	Immune	3rd 96 points	Winner; 72.80%
Débora Neves					2nd 98 points	Runner-up; 16.09%
Threerapia					1st 99 points	Third place 11.11%
Pedro Mussum					4th 93 points	
Camila Reis	3rd 94 points	1st 90 points			5th 90 points	
Bruno Vincenzi					6th 89 points	
Rodolfo Ribeiro					7th 73 points	
Nina Guimarães					8th 71 points	
Samya Nalany			3rd 84 points	1st 70 points	9th 67 points	
Lucas Fozzati	1st 98 points	Immune			10th 66 points	
Lucas Kim					11th 46 points	
Tiago Prado			2nd 89 points	2nd 53 points		
Leonel			4th 83 points			
Rodrigo Mello			5th 78 points			
Dandara Alves			6th 76 points			
Ana Barros			7th 70 points			
MC Mayarah			8th 68 points			
Rodrigo Cabral	2nd 97 points	2nd 72 points				
Rose Barcellos	4th 93 points					
Mily Taormina	5th 91 points					
Thor Junior	6th 81 points					
Guime	7th 78 points					
Anderson Ribeiro	8th 59 points					

== Ratings and reception ==
=== Brazilian ratings ===
All numbers are in points and provided by Kantar Ibope Media.

Episode	Title	Air date	Timeslot (BRT)	SP viewers (in points)	Source
1	Heat 1	September 25, 2019	Wednesday 11:00 p.m.	6.4	
2	Heat 2	October 2, 2019	Wednesday 11:00 p.m.	6.3	
3	Heat 3	October 9, 2019	Wednesday 11:00 p.m.	6.4	
4	Heat 4	October 16, 2019	Wednesday 11:00 p.m.	6.3	
5	Heat 5	October 23, 2019	Wednesday 11:00 p.m.	5.1	
6	Heat 6	October 30, 2019	Wednesday 11:00 p.m.	6.7	
7	Heat 7	November 6, 2019	Wednesday 11:00 p.m.	6.2	
8	Wildcard	November 13, 2019	Wednesday 11:00 p.m.	4.3	
9	Semifinals 1	November 20, 2019	Wednesday 11:00 p.m.	5.1	
10	Semifinals 2	November 27, 2019	Wednesday 11:00 p.m.	6.5	
11	Finals	December 4, 2019	Wednesday 11:00 p.m.	8.6	

- In 2019, each point represents 254.892 households in 15 market cities in Brazil (73.015 households in São Paulo).
