= Tu' mir nicht weh =

Single by Connie Francis
- B-side: "Paradiso"
- Released: 1962
- Recorded: April 12, 1962 both at Austrophon Studio, Vienna
- Genre: Schlager music
- Length: A-Side: 2:55; B-Side: 2:39
- Label: MGM Records 61 056
- Songwriter(s): A-side: Ted Murry, Benny Davis, Fini Busch; B-Side: Peter König, Wolfgang Zell
- Producer(s): Gerhard Mendelsohn

Connie Francis German singles chronology
""Lili Marleen"/ "Mond von Mexico"" (1962)	"Tu' mir nicht weh" (1962)	""Wenn du gehst"/ "Gondola d'Amore"" (1962)

Tu' mir nicht weh is the eighth German single recorded by U. S. entertainer Connie Francis.

== Background ==
The single's A-side is a German cover version of Francis' U.S. # 1 hit Don't Break the Heart That Loves You, which Francis also recorded in

- Italian (as Un desiderio folle)
- Japanese
- Neapolitan (as Un desiderio folle)
- Spanish (as Mi corazón te adora)

== Overview ==
The single's B-Side was Paradiso, a song written especially in German for Francis.

"Tu' mir nicht weh" peaked at No. 2 of the German charts and No. 5 on Austrian charts. while "Paradiso" peaked at No. 1, marking this record as Francis first double-sided single in Germany of which the B-side scored better on the charts than the A-side. It also did better in Austria, reaching No. 2 there. Both of the songs were later included in her 1964 Connie Francis Sings German Favorites album.

Subsequently, "Paradiso" became one of the biggest hits of the year 1962 with cover versions in

- Dutch (recorded by Anneke Grönloh)
- Finnish (recorded by Laila Kinnunen)
- French (recorded by Connie Francis)
- Malayan (recorded by Anneke Grönloh)

== Charts ==
Year	Title	AUT	GER
1962	"Tu' mir nicht weh"	5	2
1962	"Paradiso"	2	1
