= Wenn du gehst =

Single by Connie Francis
- B-side: "Gondola d'Amore"
- Released: 1962
- Recorded: A-side: April 13, 1962; B-side: April 14, 1962 both at Austrophon Studio, Vienna
- Genre: Schlager music
- Length: A-Side: 2:39; B-Side: 2:36
- Label: MGM Records 61 065
- Songwriters: A-side: Werner Scharfenberger, Fini Busch; B-Side: Charly Niessen, Joachim Relin
- Producer: Gerhard Mendelsohn

Connie Francis German singles chronology
""Tu' mir nicht weh"/ "Paradiso"" (1962)	"Wenn du gehst" (1962)	"Barcarole in der Nacht/ Colombino" (1963)

Wenn du gehst is the ninth German single recorded by U. S. entertainer Connie Francis in 1962. The B-side was Gondola d'Amore.

== Overview ==
Both songs had been written especially in German for Francis since after her previous eight German singles it had become clear that compositions of German origin were favored by the German audiences instead of cover versions of Francis' U. S. hits. The song reached No. 2 in Germany and topped the charts in Austria.

"Gondola d'Amore" was subsequently recorded by Francis in French as Toutes les étoiles.

Wenn du gehst was included in her 1964 Connie Francis Sings German Favorites album as the starting track.

== Charts ==
Year	Title	AUT	GER
1962	"Wenn du gehst"	1	2
