= Canta Comigo =

Brazilian reality television music competition

- Genre: Talent show
- Based on: All Together Now
- Directed by: Marcelo Amiky
- Presented by: Gugu Liberato (2018–19); Rodrigo Faro (2021–24)
- Judges: See The 100
- Country of origin: Brazil
- Original language: Portuguese
- No. of seasons: 6
- No. of episodes: 68

Production
- Camera setup: Multiple-camera
- Running time: 105 minutes
- Production company: Endemol Shine Brasil

Original release
- Network: RecordTV; Netflix (2021)
- Release: July 18, 2018 – June 30, 2024

Related
- Canta Comigo Teen

Canta Comigo ('Sing with Me') is a Brazilian reality television music competition show based on the British television series All Together Now. The series premiered on Wednesday, July 18, 2018, at 10:30 p.m. (BRT / AMT) on RecordTV.

The series is known for being the final show Gugu Liberato hosted prior to his death on November 21, 2019. Rodrigo Faro, who had already hosted the first season of the teen series in 2020, replaced Gugu as the main series host in 2021.

== Format ==
In each episode, a range of singers take to the stage, but waiting to judge each performance is 'The 100' - a unique panel of one hundred music experts and performers from across Brazil.

=== The heats ===
During each heat, performers try and outscore their competitors in order to earn a seat on the top three podium. Whenever a performer scores high enough for a podium place, the act in 3rd place is eliminated as a result.

From each heat, two acts go through to the semifinals. Once all acts have sung, the 1st placed performer with the highest score automatically goes through. The acts in 2nd and 3rd sing off against one another and the winner of that sing off earns the second qualification spot.

If, at any time, someone reaches the maximum score and makes the 100 judges stand up at once ensures a direct place for the grand finale. This can happen at any time in the program, either in the heats or in the semifinal.

=== The sing-off ===
For the sing-off at the end of the show, scores are reset to zero and the 2nd and 3rd placed acts perform a new song chosen from a given shortlist. In the event that both acts wish to sing the same song from that shortlist, the performer in 2nd place has priority.

=== The semifinals, the final and the prize ===
In the semifinals, the qualified candidates in the heats are resubmitted to the 100 judges in new performances seeking the final spots in the finale.

In the final, the finalists perform again in front of The 100 with a new song. This time, all three acts who finish in the top three podium seats sing again and the act with the most public votes after this final sing off wins the season and with it the R$300.000 cash prize.

== Series overview ==
Season	Winner	Runner-up	Third place	Host
1	Débora Pinheiro	Gabriel Camilo	Naheda Beydoun	Gugu Liberato
2	Franson	Débora Neves	Threerapia	Gugu Liberato
3	Braunna Siblings	Angélica Sansone	André Luis	Rodrigo Faro
4	Anna Maz	Lia Lira	Libna	Rodrigo Faro
5	Helleno	Samuca	Saulo Soul	Rodrigo Faro
6	Tânia Mayra	Carol Marques	Tirza Almeida	Rodrigo Faro

== The 100 ==
The 100 are a range of music experts and performers from across the Brazil. They were cast to include a diverse mix of ages, backgrounds and a variety of music genres.

== Ratings and reception ==
=== Brazilian ratings ===
All numbers are in points and provided by Kantar Ibope Media.

Season	Timeslot (BRT)	Premiered		Ended		TV season	SP viewers (in points)	Source
Season	Timeslot (BRT)	Date	Viewers (in points)	Date	Viewers (in points)	TV season	SP viewers (in points)	Source
1	Wednesday 10:30 pm	July 18, 2018	8.2	September 12, 2018	7.2	2018	7.47	
2	Wednesday 11:00 pm	September 25, 2019	6.4	December 4, 2019	8.6	2019	6.17	
3	Sunday 6:00 pm	April 25, 2021	7.1	July 11, 2021	8.0	2021	7.50	
4	Sunday 6:00 pm	April 10, 2022	6.4	June 26, 2022	8.8	2022	7.00	
5	Sunday 6:00 pm	April 9, 2023	7.2	June 25, 2023	7.2	2023	6.40	
6	Sunday 6:00 pm	April 14, 2024	6.5	June 30, 2024	6.5	2024	5.42	

- Each point represents a specific number of households in São Paulo.
  - 2018: 71.855 households.
  - 2019: 73.015 households.
  - 2021: 76.577 households.
  - 2022: 74.666 households.
  - 2023: 76.953 households.
  - 2024: 73.279 households.
