= Canta Comigo season 1 =

Canta Comigo
- Season 1
- Presented by: Marcelo Menezes
- Judges: See The 100
- Winner: Cláudio Mesquita
- Runner-up: Samuel João

Release
- Original network: RecordTV
- Original release: July 18 – September 12, 2018

Season chronology
- Next → Season 2

The first season of Canta Comigo premiered on Wednesday, July 18, 2018, at 10:30 p.m. (BRT / AMT) on RecordTV.

On September 12, 2018, Cláudio Mesquita won the competition with 48.80% of the public vote over Samuel João (35.07%) and Fernando Pereira(16.13%).

== Heats ==
Key
– Artist advanced to the live finals with an all-100 stand up
– Artist advanced to the semifinals with the highest score
– Artist advanced to the sing-off in either 2nd or 3rd place
– Artist score enough points to place in the Top 3 but was moved out and eliminated
– Artist didn't score enough points to place in the Top 3 and was directly eliminated
– Artist was eliminated but received the judges' save and advanced to the semifinals

=== Heat 1 ===
Order	Artist	Song	Score	Place	Result
1	Camilo Rodrigues	"Terra do Futebol"	99	1st	Advanced
2	Nicolina Rammah	"You Are Me"	79	2nd	Eliminated
3	Fernando Pereira	"Poder Estar Presente"	95	2nd	Advanced
4	Daniela Silva	"Seja Feliz"	66	—	Eliminated
5	Letícia Marquez	"Almost"	85	3rd	Eliminated
6	George Castro	"Serra do Sul"	100	—	Finalist
7	Leandro Damião	"A Madeira"	59	—	Eliminated
8	Renato Souza	"Tomorrow"	99	3rd	Advanced
9	Bruno Santos	"Runner"	71	—	Eliminated
10	Carol Ribeiro	"Not Alone For Night"	81	—	Eliminated

Sing-off details

Order	Artist	Song	Score	Place	Result
1	Renato Souza	"Não Entendo"	62	—	Saved
2	Fernando Pereira	"I Like Me"	84	1st	Advanced

=== Heat 2 ===
Order	Artist	Song	Score	Place	Result
1	Erick Mattos	"Hora do Rock"	75	1st	Eliminated
2	Flávia Medeiros	"Rainyou"	51	1st	Eliminated
3	Cláudio Mesquita	"Tempo Eterno"	97	1st	Advanced
4	Roberto Penna	"All You"	83	3rd	Eliminated
5	Pérola Rodrigues	"Sei Lá"	78	—	Eliminated
6	Nicole Teixeira	"Flor do Oriente"	98	2nd	Advanced
7	Rafael Moraes	"Summer Boy"	93	3rd	Advanced
8	Edmundo Petterle	"Coração Sujo"	87	—	Saved
9	Nathan Soares	"Fool Love"	52	—	Eliminated
10	Cristiano Lima	"When Ain"	80	—	Eliminated

Sing-off details

Order	Artist	Song	Score	Place	Result
1	Rafael Moraes	"Crazy Love"	88	—	Eliminated
2	Nicole Teixeira	"Ever Day"	99	1st	Advanced

=== Heat 3 ===
Order	Artist	Song	Score	Place	Result
1	Leona Alves	"Sinais de Amor"	83	1st^{^{2}}	Advanced
2	Zeca da Sanfona	"Forró da Paixão"	93	2nd^{^{1}}	Eliminated
3	Davi Leonardo	"Fora de Órbita"	87	3rd	Eliminated
4	Fabiana Helena	"Joy"	64	—	Eliminated
5	Sérgio Henrique	"Cupido do Amor"	95	3rd^{^{1}}	Eliminated
6	Manuel	"Triste Demais"	99	1st^{^{2}}	Advanced
7	Gaby Lima	"Quem é o Amor?"	79	—	Eliminated
8	Armando Gonçalves	"O Rapaz"	92	1st	Advanced
9	Gabriel Santiago	"Set Flash on Gown"	70	—	Eliminated
10	João Leão	"Vieira"	54	—	Eliminated

Sing-off details

Order	Artist	Song	Score	Place	Result
1	Manuel	"Sangue"	91	1st	Advanced
2	Leona Alves	"Coração Nerd"	68	—	Eliminated

=== Heat 4 ===
Order	Artist	Song	Score	Place	Result
1	Cléber Araújo	"Sem Limites"	99	1st	Advanced
2	Vitória Andrade	"Coragem de Amor"	73	2nd	Saved
3	Júlia Jorge	"Pra Não Entender o Desabafo"	97	2nd	Advanced
4	Kauan Ferrari	"Love Rain"	65	—	Eliminated
5	Felipe e Francisco	"Sertanejo Raiz"	93	3rd	Eliminated
6	Thiago Teixeira	"Cílios"	98	1st	Advanced
7	Mônica Carvalho	"Só Amizade"	74	—	Eliminated
8	Raul Meireles	"Chorando no Chuveiro"	65	—	Eliminated
9	Lucas Queiroz	"Não"	85	—	Eliminated
10	Liliana Ribeiro	"Are Bain You"	78	—	Eliminated
11	Neguinha da Silva	"Maloqueira"	66	—	Eliminated

Sing-off details

Order	Artist	Song	Score	Place	Result
1	Júlia Jorge	"Mundo de Amor"	89	1st	Advanced
2	Cléber Araújo	"Qualquer"	55	—	Eliminated

=== Heat 5 ===
Order	Artist	Song	Score	Place	Result
1	Eliene Silveira	"Saber"	85	1st	Eliminated
2	Samuel João	"Momento de Tensão"	99	1st	Advanced
3	Rodrigo Salomão	"Num Dia"	94	2nd	Advanced
4	Luciana Miranda	"Not Your Arounding"	91	3rd	Eliminated
5	Juliano Sarkozy	"Meu Destino é Seguir"	96	3rd	Eliminated
6	Dudu Menezes	"All Get"	82	—	Eliminated
7	Solange Sampaio	"Amor Sangrento"	55	—	Eliminated
8	Brunão Gonzaga	"Pandeiro na Mão"	75	—	Eliminated
9	Luana Regina	"Ask For You Light"	78	—	Eliminated
10	Nathan Portugal	"Último Beijo"	97	2nd	Advanced

Sing-off details

Order	Artist	Song	Score	Place	Result
1	Nathan Portugal	"Menina"	74	1st	Advanced
2	Rodrigo Salomão	"Fronteiras do Amor"	53	—	Eliminated

=== Heat 6 ===
Order	Artist	Song	Score	Place	Result
1	Miguel Costa	"Você Largou o Horizonte"	97	1st	Advanced
2	Natália Joaquina	"Será um Sonho"	99	1st	Advanced
3	Caio Figueiredo	"Eyes of the Snake"	100	—	Finalist
4	Antônio e Alemão	"Camarada"	70	3rd	Eliminated
5	Edu Paulo	"Xerox"	90	3rd	Eliminated
6	Samira Hamburgo	"Ninguém Atrás"	77	—	Eliminated
7	Enzo Alves	"All Yes"	85	—	Eliminated
8	Mauro Santiago	"A Cor do Mar"	100	—	Finalist
9	Mateus Alexandre	"Santo Mão de Anjo"	96	2nd	Advanced
10	Laurie	"Te Encontro Aqui"	94	—	Saved
11	Felipe Vieira	"Mirror Man"	100	—	Finalist

Sing-off details

Order	Artist	Song	Score	Place	Result
1	Mateus Alexandre	"Fumaça ao Ar"	79	1st	Advanced
2	Miguel Costa	"Sozinho no Sertão"	71	—	Eliminated

== Semifinals ==
=== Week 1 ===
Order	Artist	Song	Score	Place	Result
1	Thiago Teixeira	"São Paulo"	77	1st	Eliminated
2	Nathan Portugal	"Get Ready for Action"	53	2nd	Eliminated
3	Laurie	"Heart"	81	3rd	Eliminated
4	Samuel João	"Estrelas me Contam"	98	1st	Advanced
5	Manuel	"Coração Antigo"	67	—	Eliminated
6	Edmundo Petterle	"Canais de TV"	99	1st^{^{3}}	Advanced
7	Cláudio Mesquita	"Joker Face"	96	1st^{^{3}}	Advanced
8	Júlia Jorge	"Naquela Praça"	73	—	Eliminated

Sing-off details

Order	Artist	Song	Score	Place	Result
1	Samuel João	"O Rei do Sanfoneiro"	94	1st	Advanced
2	Edmundo Petterle	"Cabelo de Peixe"	60	—	Eliminated

=== Week 2 ===
Order	Artist	Song	Score	Place	Result
1	Fernando Pereira	"Coração Acelerado"	99	1st	Advanced
2	Mateus Alexandre	"Poemas da Paixão"	97	1st	Advanced
3	Nicole Teixeira	"Girl of Rain"	85	3rd	Eliminated
4	Natália Joaquina	"Maria Esmeralda"	89	3rd	Eliminated
5	Camilo Rodrigues	"Brasil Abrasivo"	95	3rd	Eliminated
6	Armando Gonçalves	"What Love For Me"	98	1st	Advanced
7	Renato Souza	"Never Escape"	58	—	Eliminated
8	Vitória Andrade	"Dor de Cotovelo"	68	—	Eliminated

Sing-off details

Order	Artist	Song	Score	Place	Result
1	Mateus Alexandre	"Fogo Ardente"	53	—	Eliminated
2	Fernando Pereira	"Amar ou Não Amar"	93	1st	Advanced

== Finals ==
Order	Artist	Song	Score	Place	Result
1	Samuel João	"Um Novo Amanhecer"	98	1st	Advanced
2	George Castro	"Night Rain"	73	2nd	Eliminated
3	Felipe Vieira	"Chega de Apaixonar"	63	3rd	Eliminated
4	Fernando Pereira	"Love Stinks"	99	1st	Advanced
5	Cláudio Mesquita	"Paixão Oculta"	97	3rd	Advanced
6	Mauro Santiago	"Depois é Assim"	79	—	Eliminated
7	Caio Figueiredo	"Vermelho Sangue"	69	—	Eliminated
8	Armando Gonçalves	"Efeito Passageiro"	70	—	Eliminated

Sing-off details

Order	Artist	Song	Score	Place	Result
1	Cláudio Mesquita	"Floresta Estreante"	100	1st	Winner
2	Samuel João	"Calor de Verão"	100	3rd	Third place
3	Fernando Pereira	"Just Rock Pub"	100	2nd	Runner-up

== Elimination chart ==
Key

Winner
Runner-up
Third place

Advanced
In sing-off

Immunity
Eliminated

== Ratings and reception ==
=== Brazilian ratings ===
All numbers are in points and provided by Kantar Ibope Media.

Episode	Title	Air date	Timeslot (BRT)	SP viewers (in points)	Source
1	Heat 1	July 18, 2018	Wednesday 10:30 p.m.	8.2	
2	Heat 2	July 25, 2018	Wednesday 10:30 p.m.	7.5	
3	Heat 3	August 1, 2018	Wednesday 10:30 p.m.	7.6	
4	Heat 4	August 8, 2018	Wednesday 10:30 p.m.	8.0	
5	Heat 5	August 15, 2018	Wednesday 10:30 p.m.	7.7	
6	Heat 6	August 22, 2018	Wednesday 10:30 p.m.	7.3	
7	Semifinals 1	August 29, 2018	Wednesday 10:30 p.m.	6.8	
8	Semifinals 2	September 5, 2018	Wednesday 10:30 p.m.	6.9	
9	Finals	September 12, 2018	Wednesday 10:30 p.m.	7.2	

- In 2018, each point represents 248.647 households in 15 market cities in Brazil (71.855 households in São Paulo).
