= Canta Comigo season 4 =

Canta Comigo
- Season 4
- Presented by: Rodrigo Faro
- Judges: See The 100
- Winner: Anna Maz
- Runner-up: Lia Lira

Release
- Original network: RecordTV
- Original release: April 10 – June 26, 2022

Season chronology
- ← Previous; Season 3 Next → Season 5

The fourth season of Canta Comigo premiered on Sunday, April 10, 2022, at 6:00 / 5:00 p.m. (BRT / AMT) on RecordTV.

On June 26, 2022, Anna Maz won the competition with 66.72% of the public vote over Lia Lira (22.95%) and Libna (10.33%).

It was the first season to feature a split season finale due to the record number of finalists (22) and also to have an all-female final three.

== Heats ==
Key
– Artist advanced to the finals with an all-100 stand up
– Artist advanced to the semifinals with the highest score
– Artist advanced to the sing-off in either 2nd or 3rd place
– Artist score enough points to place in the Top 3 but was moved out and eliminated
– Artist didn't score enough points to place in the Top 3 and was directly eliminated
– Artist was eliminated but received the judges' save and advanced to the wildcard

=== Heat 1 ===
Order	Artist	Song	Score	Place	Result
1	Thiago Acacio	"Sonhar Não Custa Nada"	93	1st	Eliminated
2	Kátia Franco	"'O sole mio"	98	1st	Advanced
3	Giovanna Urano	"Todo Mundo Menos Você"	64	3rd	Eliminated
4	Lia Lira	"Saving All My Love for You"	100	—	Finalist
5	André & Mari	"Olha o Que o Amor Me Faz"	81	3rd	Eliminated
6	Leandro Samora	"All of Me"	71	—	Eliminated
7	Bruna Thielle	"A Queda"	94	2nd	Advanced
8	Hilda Maria	"Sebastiana"	96	2nd	Advanced
9	Alanna Almeida	"You Oughta Know"	77	—	Eliminated
10	Justina Derise	"Easy on Me"	92	—	Wildcard

Sing-off details

Order	Artist	Song	Score	Place	Result
1	Hilda Maria	"Brasileirinho"	94	1st	Advanced
2	Bruna Thielle	"(I Can't Get No) Satisfaction"	75	—	Wildcard

=== Heat 2 ===
Order	Artist	Song	Score	Place	Result
1	Elias Matarazzo	"I'm Not the Only One"	98	1st	Wildcard
2	Manú Rodrigues	"La belle de jour"	95	2nd	Eliminated
3	Dona Russa	"O Show Tem Que Continuar"	99	1st	Advanced
4	Tatila Krau	"One and Only"	99	1st^{^{1}}	Advanced
5	Nazaré Araújo	"Tudo Bem"	100	—	Finalist
6	Maia Twins	"Sing"	72	—	Eliminated
7	Letícia D'Alma	"Fallin"	99	2nd^{^{2}}	Advanced
8	Ivanna Domenyco	"Perigo"	76	—	Eliminated
9	Gui Valença	"Saigon"	100	—	Finalist
10	Libna	"Redemption Song"	100	—	Finalist

Sing-off details

Order	Artist	Song	Score	Place	Result
1	Dona Russa	"Insensato Destino"	98	1st	Advanced
2	Letícia D'Alma	"American Boy"	83	—	Wildcard

=== Heat 3 ===
Order	Artist	Song	Score	Place	Result
1	Ivis & Carraro	"Deus Me Livre"	92	1st	Eliminated
2	Suê Domingues	"Got to Be Real"	82	2nd	Eliminated
3	André Luiz	"Ex-Amor"	70	3rd	Eliminated
4	Heloísa Araújo	"Disk Me"	98	1st	Advanced
5	Ed Souza	"Chão de Giz"	96	2nd	Eliminated
6	Luana Granai	"Triste, Louca ou Má"	98	1st^{^{3}}	Advanced
7	Javier Montes	"Corazón Espinado"	99	1st	Advanced
8	Raysa Rocha	"Foi Pá Pum"	97	—	Eliminated
9	Indira Castillo	"I Put a Spell on You"	93	—	Wildcard
10	João Villela	"It's My Life"	87	—	Eliminated

Sing-off details

Order	Artist	Song	Score	Place	Result
1	Luana Granai	"De Quem é a Culpa?"	81	—	Wildcard
2	Heloísa Araújo	"Bebi Liguei"	87	1st	Advanced

=== Heat 4 ===
Order	Artist	Song	Score	Place	Result
1	Milu Vianna	"Flashdance... What a Feeling"	98	1st	Advanced
2	Denilson Novaes	"Melhor Eu Ir"	94	2nd	Eliminated
3	Ally V	"Dynamite"	100	—	Finalist
4	Pedro Caio	"Jeremy"	93	3rd	Eliminated
5	Nicole Carrion	"Gracias a la Vida"	93	3rd^{^{4}}	Wildcard
6	Lariene Prata	"Never Tear Us Apart"	100	—	Finalist
7	Tejota	"Aguenta Coração"	78	—	Eliminated
8	Maza	"Beat It"	65	—	Eliminated
9	Gabriel Lima	"Depois do Prazer"	97	2nd	Advanced
10	Jade & Judye	"Lady Marmalade"	99	1st	Advanced

Sing-off details

Order	Artist	Song	Score	Place	Result
1	Milu Vianna	"The Edge of Glory"	68	—	Eliminated
2	Gabriel Lima	"Não Precisa Mudar"	97	1st	Advanced

=== Heat 5 ===
Order	Artist	Song	Score	Place	Result
1	Ariane Villa Lobos	"Crazy"	97	1st	Advanced
2	Allan Vilches	"Brindisi"	99	1st	Advanced
3	Gustavo Neri	"Love Me Tender"	85	3rd	Eliminated
4	Sofia Gayoso	"Mal Acostumado"	73	—	Eliminated
5	Wand Barbosa	"Bang"	76	—	Eliminated
6	Rudi Hartog	"Take Me Home, Country Roads"	100	—	Finalist
7	Bruna Higs	"A Tua Voz"	98	2nd	Advanced
8	Vozes do Sertão	"Ego"	60	—	Eliminated
9	Priscila Gouvêa	"Isso Aqui o Que é?"	100	—	Finalist
10	Berg Gonzaga	"Cada Volta é um Recomeço"	87	—	Wildcard

Sing-off details

Order	Artist	Song	Score	Place	Result
1	Bruna Higs	"Bang Bang"	92	1st	Advanced
2	Ariane Villa Lobos	"I'm with You"	84	—	Wildcard

=== Heat 6 ===
Order	Artist	Song	Score	Place	Result
1	Robson Lima	"Exagerado"	72	1st	Eliminated
2	Angel Sberse	"Best of You"	100	—	Finalist
3	Dennys & Raffael	"Ela e Ela"	88	1st	Eliminated
4	Rayane Boldrini	"Dog Days Are Over"	98	1st	Advanced
5	Gabriel Von Brixen	"Rude"	92	2nd	Eliminated
6	Graciela Soares	"Juízo Final"	99	1st	Advanced
7	Anna Maz	"The Phantom Of The Opera"	100	—	Finalist
8	Alysson Martins	"Isn't She Lovely"	100	—	Finalist
9	Aloysio Letra	"Temporal"	78	—	Eliminated
10	Aline Gil	"Didn't We Almost Have It All"	98	2nd^{^{5}}	Advanced

Sing-off details

Order	Artist	Song	Score	Place	Result
1	Aline Gil	"Emoções"	99	1st	Advanced
2	Rayane Boldrini	"Hotel California"	95	—	Wildcard

=== Heat 7 ===
Order	Artist	Song	Score	Place	Result
1	Hugo Branquinho	"Muito Estranho (Cuida Bem de Mim)"	67	1st	Eliminated
2	Vitória & Gabriela	"Nascemos Pra Cantar"	94	1st	Eliminated
3	Debora Sanna	"Blue Moon"	99	1st	Advanced
4	Gabriel Cruz	"Free Fallin'"	51	—	Eliminated
5	Paulo Lima	"Forever"	90	3rd	Eliminated
6	Allira	"Lamento Sertanejo"	97	2nd	Advanced
7	Rafael Horta	"Não Quero Mais"	84	—	Eliminated
8	Piettro	"Beggin'"	100	—	Finalist
9	Gab Veneziani	"Aprendendo a Jogar"	65	—	Eliminated
10	Zé William	"Numb"	97	3rd^{^{6}}	Advanced

Sing-off details

Order	Artist	Song	Score	Place	Result
1	Zé William	"Just the Way You Are"	99	1st	Advanced
2	Allira	"Xote das Meninas"	82	—	Wildcard

== Wildcard ==
Order	Artist	Song	Score	Place	Result
1	Indira Castillo	"Mercy"	100	—	Advanced
2	Berg Gonzaga	"Como Vai Você"	89	1st	Eliminated
3	Luana Granai	"I Still Haven't Found What I'm Looking For"	75	2nd	Eliminated
4	Justina Derise	"Stay"	99	1st	Advanced
5	Rayane Boldrini	"Are You Gonna Be My Girl"	76	3rd	Eliminated
6	Nicole Carrion	"Asa Morena"	100	—	Advanced
7	Elias Matarazzo	"Somewhere Only We Know"	81	3rd	Eliminated
8	Bruna Thielle	"Like a Virgin"	98	2nd	Advanced
9	Letícia D'Alma	"Super Duper Love (Are You Diggin' on Me)"	97	3rd	Advanced
10	Allira	"Lindo Lago do Amor"	100	—	Advanced
11	Ariane Villa Lobos	"Superstition"	100	—	Advanced

Sing-off details

Order	Artist	Song	Score	Place	Result
1	Bruna Thielle	"Mania de Você"	83	1st	Advanced
2	Letícia D'Alma	"A Paz"	63	—	Eliminated

== Semifinals ==
=== Week 1 ===
Order	Artist	Song	Score	Place	Result
1	Hilda Maria	"Isso Aqui Tá Bom Demais"	91	1st	Eliminated
2	Gabriel Lima	"Tá Vendo Aquela Lua"	94	1st	Advanced
3	Jade & Judye	"When You Believe"	100	—	Finalist
4	Kátia Franco	"Nessun dorma"	97	1st	Advanced
5	Bruna Higs	"Can't Stop Lovin' You"	78	—	Eliminated
6	Dona Russa	"Coração de Desalinho"	91	3rd^{^{7}}	Eliminated
7	Heloísa Araújo	"Talismã"	81	—	Eliminated
8	Javier Montes	"A Mi Manera (My Way)"	98	1st	Advanced
9	Aline Gil	"Your Song"	88	—	Eliminated
10	Tátila Krau	"Million Reasons"	100	—	Finalist

Sing-off details

Order	Artist	Song	Score	Place	Result
1	Kátia Franco	"Parla più piano"	98	1st	Advanced
2	Gabriel Lima	"É Tarde Demais"	94	—	Eliminated

=== Week 2 ===
Order	Artist	Song	Score	Place	Result
1	Allan Vilches	"Funiculì, Funiculà"	99	1st	Advanced
2	Graciela Soares	"Chiclete Com Banana"	88	2nd	Eliminated
3	Bruna Thielle	"You're the One That I Want"	97	2nd	Advanced
4	Nicole Carrion	"Corazón Partío"	84	—	Eliminated
5	Indira Castillo	"Gimme Shelter"	96	3rd	Eliminated
6	Ariane Villa Lobos	"It's a Man's Man's Man's World"	100	—	Finalist
7	Allira	"Zé do Caroço"	100	—	Finalist
8	Justina Derise	"Reach"	94	—	Eliminated
9	Zé William	"Before You Go"	97	2nd^{^{8}}	Advanced
10	Debora Sanna	"Roxanne"	100	—	Finalist

Sing-off details

Order	Artist	Song	Score	Place	Result
1	Zé William	"You're Still the One"	100	—	Finalist
2	Bruna Thielle	—	—	1st	Advanced

== Finals ==
Order	Artist	Song	Score	Place	Result
Part 1
1	Allira	"Você Me Vira A Cabeça (Me Tira Do Sério)"	97	1st	Eliminated
2	Jade & Judye	"Can You Feel the Love Tonight"	95	2nd	Eliminated
3	Piettro	Don't Stop Me Now"	94	3rd	Eliminated
4	Kátia Franco	"Hino ao Amor"	99	1st	Eliminated
5	Bruna Thielle	"Love on the Brain"	88	—	Eliminated
6	Alysson Martins	"Por Um Minuto"	72	—	Eliminated
7	Lariene Prata	"Hero"	100	1st	Eliminated
8	Ally V	"Rolling in the Deep"	88	—	Eliminated
9	Rudi Hartog	"The Impossible Dream (The Quest)"	75	—	Eliminated
10	Nazaré Araújo	"Vitoriosa"	89	—	Eliminated
11	Gui Valença	"O Que É, o Que É?"	88	—	Eliminated
12	Ariane Villa Lobos	"Feeling Good"	97	3rd^{^{9}}	Eliminated
Part 2
13	Libna	"Leave the Door Open"	100	1st^{^{10}}	Advanced
14	Priscila Gouvêa	"Presciso Me Encontrar"	93	—	Eliminated
15	Javier Montes	"María"	79	—	Eliminated
16	Tatila Krau	"Someone You Loved"	81	—	Eliminated
17	Angel Sberse	"Maniac"	69	—	Eliminated
18	Debora Sanna	"Tocando em Frente"	90	—	Eliminated
19	Zé William	"Meu Universo é Você"	96	—	Eliminated
20	Anna Maz	"Wuthering Heights"	100	1st^{^{11}}	Advanced
21	Allan Vilches	"Bella ciao"	94	—	Eliminated
22	Lia Lira	"Stand Up"	100	1st^{^{12}}	Advanced

Sing-off details

Order	Artist	Song	Score	Place	Result
1	Libna	"Chain of Fools"	100	3rd	Third place
2	Anna Maz	"Fame"	100	1st	Winner
3	Lia Lira	"Dangerous Woman"	100	2nd	Runner-up

Notes

- ^Note 1 : Tie between Tatila Krau and Dona Russa for 1st. Tatila won 54–46. Elias Matarazzo moved (3rd); Manú Rodrigues eliminated.
- ^Note 2 : Elias Matarazzo eliminated as result of a tie between Letícia D'Alma, Tatila Krau and Dona Russa for 1st/2nd; Letícia won 64–36 against Dona Russa for 2nd, moving her to 3rd; Tatila won 51–49 against Letícia and secured herself in 1st.
- ^Note 3 : Tie between Luana Granai and Heloísa Araújo for 1st. Luana won 56–44. Ed Souza moved (3rd); Ivis & Carrasco eliminated.
- ^Note 4 : Tie between Nicole Carrion and Pedro Caio for 3rd. Nicole won 75–25, thus eliminating him.
- ^Note 5 : Tie between Aline Gil and Rayane Boldrini for 2nd. Aline won 63–37. Gabriel Von Brixen eliminated.
- ^Note 6 : Tie between Ze William and Allira for 2nd. Allira won 54–46. Vitória & Gabriela eliminated.
- ^Note 7 : Tie between Dona Russa and Hilda Maria for 3rd. Both tied again 50–50, so neither were eliminated.
- ^Note 8 : Tie between Ze William and Bruna Thielle for 2nd. Ze William won 67–33. Indira Castillo eliminated.
- ^Note 9 : Tie between Ariane Villa Lobos and Allira for 3rd. Ariane won 71–29, thus eliminating her.
- ^Note 10 : Tie between Libna and Lariene Prata for 1st. Libna won 59–41. Kátia Franco moved (3rd); Ariane Villa Lobos eliminated.
- ^Note 11 : Kátia Franco eliminated as result of a tie between Anna Maz, Libna and Lariene Prata for 1st/2nd; Anna won 67–33 against Lariene for 2nd, moving her to 3rd; Anna won 55–45 against Libna for 1st.
- ^Note 12 : Tie between Lia Lira, Anna Maz, Libna and Lariene Prata for 1st/2nd/3rd. Lia won 80–20 against Lariene for 3rd, thus eliminating her; Lia won 77–23 against the Libna for 2nd, moving her to 3rd; Lia won 61–39 against Anna for 1st.

== Elimination chart ==
Key

Winner
Runner-up
Third place

Advanced
In sing-off

Immunity
Eliminated

Artist	Semifinals 1		Semifinals 2		Finals	
Artist	Qualifying	Sing-off	Qualifying	Sing-off	Qualifying	Sing-off
Anna Maz					2nd 100 points	Winner; 66.72%
Lia Lira					1st 100 points	Runner-up; 22.95%
Libna					3rd 100 points	Third place 10.33%
Lariene Prata					4th 100 points	
Kátia Franco	2nd 97 points	1st 98 points			5th 99 points	
Ariane Villa Lobos			Finalist; 100 points		6th 97 points	
Allira			Finalist; 100 points		7th 97 points	
Ze William			2nd 97 points	Finalist; 100 points	8th 96 points	
Jade & Judye	Finalists; 100 points				9th 95 points	
Allan Vilches			1st 99 points	Immune	10th–11th 94 points	
Piettro					10th–11th 94 points	
Priscila Gouvêa					12th 93 points	
Debora Sanna			Finalist; 100 points		13th 90 points	
Nazaré Araújo					14th 89 points	
Ally V					15th–17th 88 points	
Bruna Thielle			3rd 97 points	1st Automatic	15th–17th 88 points	
Gui Valença					15th–17th 88 points	
Tatila Krau	Finalist; 100 points				18th 81 points	
Javier Montes	1st 98 points	Immune			19th 79 points	
Rudi Hartog					20th 75 points	
Alysson Martins					21st 72 points	
Angel Sberse					22nd 69 points	
Indira Castillo			4th 96 points			
Justina Derise			5th 94 points			
Graciela Soares			6th 88 points			
Nicole Carrion			7th 84 points			
Gabriel Lima	3rd 94 points	2nd 94 points				
Dona Russa	4th–5th 91 points					
Hilda Maria	4th–5th 91 points					
Aline Gil	6th 88 points					
Bruna Higs	7th 78 points					
Heloísa Araújo	8th 76 points					

== Ratings and reception ==
=== Brazilian ratings ===
All numbers are in points and provided by Kantar Ibope Media.

Episode	Title	Air date	Timeslot (BRT)	SP viewers (in points)	Source
1	Heat 1	April 10, 2022	Sunday 6:00 p.m.	6.4	
2	Heat 2	April 17, 2022	Sunday 6:00 p.m.	6.4	
3	Heat 3	April 24, 2022	Sunday 6:00 p.m.	6.6	
4	Heat 4	May 1, 2022	Sunday 6:00 p.m.	7.3	
5	Heat 5	May 8, 2022	Sunday 6:00 p.m.	6.4	
6	Heat 6	May 15, 2022	Sunday 6:00 p.m.	6.8	
7	Heat 7	May 22, 2022	Sunday 6:00 p.m.	6.6	
8	Wildcard	May 29, 2022	Sunday 6:00 p.m.	7.0	
9	Semifinals 1	June 5, 2022	Sunday 6:00 p.m.	6.3	
10	Semifinals 2	June 12, 2022	Sunday 6:00 p.m.	7.0	
11	Finals Part 1	June 19, 2022	Sunday 6:00 p.m.	8.4	
12	Finals Part 2	June 26, 2022	Sunday 6:00 p.m.	8.8	

- In 2022, each point represents 258.821 households in 15 market cities in Brazil (74.666 households in São Paulo).
