= Buddy (German singer) =

German singer

- Birth name: Sebastian Erl
- Origin: Berlin, Germany
- Genres: Eurodance, Trance
- Years active: 2003-present

Sebastian Erl is a German singer originating from Berlin known by the artistic name Buddy. His album "Ab in den Süden" was released in 2003.

== Discography ==
=== Singles ===
Year	Title	Peak chart positions		
Year	Title	GER	AUT	SWI
2003	"Ab in den Süden" (credited as Buddy vs. DJ The Wave)	2	1	34
2003	"Ab auf die Piste"	56	20	–
2004	"Wattn Ding"	–	39	–
2005	"Wir sind Papst" (with Urbi & Orbi)	57	–	–
2005	"Mama Mallorca"	95	55	–
2010	"Sommer lass mich nicht allein" (feat Meri)	69	–	–
