= Barcarole in der Nacht =

Single by Connie Francis
- B-side: "Colombino"
- Released: 1963
- Recorded: A-side: February 5, 1963 at The Sahara Hotel, Las Vegas; B-side: April 13, 1962 at Austrophon Studio, Vienna
- Genre: Schlager music
- Length: A-Side: 2:03; B-Side: 2:42
- Label: MGM Records 61 078
- Songwriters: A-side: Werner Scharfenberger, Kurt Feltz; B-Side: Charly Niessen, Joachim Relin
- Producer: Gerhard Mendelsohn

Connie Francis German singles chronology
"Wenn du gehst" (1962)	"Barcarole in der Nacht" (1963)	"Die Nacht ist mein" (1963)

Barcarole in der Nacht is the tenth German single recorded by U. S. entertainer Connie Francis. The B-side was Colombino.

Both songs had been written especially in German for Francis since it had become clear after her previous nine German singles that compositions of German origin were favored by the German audiences to cover versions of Francis' U. S. hits.

== Overview ==
"Barcarole in der Nacht" peaked at #1 of the German charts and remains a fan favorite. It also did well in other German-speaking countries like the Netherlands, where it reached #7, (her only German song that charted there), and in Austria where it reached #2.

== Overdubbing ==
Francis overdubbed Italian vocals to the orchestral playback of "Colombino" on May 7, 1962; this recording, however, remains unreleased to this day.

== Charts ==
Year	Title	AUT	GER	NL
1963	"Barcarole in der Nacht"	2	1	7
