= Canta Comigo season 5 =

Canta Comigo
- Season 5
- Presented by: Rodrigo Faro
- Judges: See The 100
- Winner: Helleno
- Runner-up: Samuca

Release
- Original network: RecordTV
- Original release: April 9 – June 25, 2023

Season chronology
- ← Previous; Season 4

The fifth season of Canta Comigo premiered on Sunday, April 9, 2023, at 6:30 / 5:30 p.m. (BRT / AMT) on RecordTV.

On June 25, 2023, Helleno won the competition with 51.39% of the public vote over Samuca (36.19%) and Saulo Soul (12.42%).

== Heats ==
Key
– Artist advanced to the finals with an all-100 stand up
– Artist advanced to the next stage with the highest score
– Artist advanced to the sing-off in either 2nd or 3rd place
– Artist score enough points to place in the Top 3 but was moved out and eliminated
– Artist didn't score enough points to place in the Top 3 and was directly eliminated
– Artist was eliminated but received the judges' save and advanced to the wildcard

=== Heat 1 ===
Order	Artist	Song	Score	Place	Result
1	Mari Brito	"Um Anjo Veio Me Falar"	99	1st	Advanced
2	Luciano Rissetto	"You've Lost That Lovin' Feelin'"	96	2nd	Eliminated
3	Alle	"Quando a Chuva Passar"	98	2nd	Advanced
4	Solo 4	"Treasure"	90	—	Eliminated
5	Deia	"Motel Afrodite"	42	—	Eliminated
6	Rafa Laranja	"Água de Chuva no Mar"	89	—	Eliminated
7	Gerard Macapagal	"Perfect Symphony"	100	—	Finalist
8	Luma Gouveia	"We Found Love"	88	—	Eliminated
9	Nath Rodrigues	"Los Hermanos"	99	1st^{^{1}}	Advanced
10	Felipe Santos	"Use Somebody"	100	—	Finalist

Sing-off details

Order	Artist	Song	Score	Place	Result
1	Alle	"Unholy"	94	1st	Advanced
2	Mari Brito	"Stone Cold"	92	—	Wildcard

=== Heat 2 ===
Order	Artist	Song	Score	Place	Result
1	Deborah Passos	"Seu Amor Ainda É Tudo"	99	1st	Wildcard
2	Makaule	"Vícios e Virtudes"	70	2nd	Eliminated
3	Leila Santana	"Sorte Que Cê Beija Bem"	90	2nd	Eliminated
4	Eduardo Porto	"I Heard It Through The Grapevine"	99	1st^{^{2}}	Advanced
5	Marcela Martins	"Tristeza Pé No Chão"	99	2nd^{^{3}}	Advanced
6	Brunelli	"You Are Not Alone"	99	3rd^{^{4}}	Advanced
7	Marcelle Maganha	"We Will Rock You"	62	—	Eliminated
8	Nega Jackie	"Levada Louca"	77	—	Eliminated
9	Sami Chohfi	"Basket Case"	77	—	Eliminated
10	Nathy Moraes	"Greatest Love of All "	100	—	Finalist

Sing-off details

Order	Artist	Song	Score	Place	Result
1	Brunelli	"Sobrevivi"	98	—	Wildcard
2	Marcela Martins	"Alguém Me Avisou"	99	1st	Advanced

=== Heat 3 ===
Order	Artist	Song	Score	Place	Result
1	Raphael Viana	"Mia Gioconda"	99	1st	Advanced
2	Islayne & Iara	"É Por Você Que Canto"	79	2nd	Eliminated
3	Dae Nino	"Flor do Reggae"	74	3rd	Eliminated
4	Davi Muniz	"Meu Mel"	86	2nd	Eliminated
5	Thaiz Lossio	"À Primeira Vista"	96	2nd	Eliminated
6	Lucinha Alves	"À Queima Roupa"	96	2nd^{^{5}}	Advanced
7	Jullyana Netto	"Te Amar Foi Ilusão"	99	1st^{^{6}}	Advanced
8	Thais Fernandes	"Termina Comigo Antes"	62	—	Eliminated
9	Daniel Cruz	"Lately"	92	—	Wildcard
10	Duda Martins	"Me Usa"	94	—	Eliminated

Sing-off details

Order	Artist	Song	Score	Place	Result
1	Lucinha Alves	"Porque Brigamos"	85	—	Eliminated
2	Raphael Viana	"Con te partirò"	96	1st	Advanced

=== Heat 4 ===
Order	Artist	Song	Score	Place	Result
1	Claudia Nascimento	"Skyfall"	89	1st	Eliminated
2	Anna Júlia	"Boiadeira"	63	2nd	Eliminated
3	San Oliver	"She Will Be Loved"	96	1st	Wildcard
4	Ariane Wink	"El día que me quieras"	100	—	Finalist
5	Rodrigo Anjos	"Let's Stay Together"	97	1st	Advanced
6	Ju Rosario	"Paciência"	99	1st	Advanced
7	Samuca	"A Volta do Boêmio"	99	1st^{^{7}}	Advanced
8	Kariny Teixeira	"Elevador"	92	—	Eliminated
9	Modão de Batom	"Any Man of Mine"	93	—	Eliminated
10	Elriel	"(Everything I Do) I Do It For You"	100	—	Finalist

Sing-off details

Order	Artist	Song	Score	Place	Result
1	Ju Rosario	"Because You Loved Me"	92	1st	Advanced
2	Rodrigo Anjos	"That's What I Like"	63	—	Eliminated

=== Heat 5 ===
Order	Artist	Song	Score	Place	Result
1	Frank Henrique	"It's a Heartache"	97	1st	Eliminated
2	Tamires Santana	"Regime Fechado"	99	1st	Advanced
3	Matheus Estevão	"Uptown Funk"	94	3rd	Eliminated
4	Julianna Silva & Antônio Felipe	"Quizás, Quizás, Quizás"	94	—^{^{8}}	Eliminated
5	Lolah	"Love On Top"	79	—	Eliminated
6	Jhony Miranda	"Batom de Cereja"	52	—	Eliminated
7	Michele Idalgo	"Eternal Flame"	80	—	Eliminated
8	Ricardinho Martiliano	"Billie Jean"	99	1st^{^{9}}	Advanced
9	Saulo Soul	"Taj Mahal"	100	—	Finalist
10	Karol Carvalho	"Nesta Noite o Amor Chegou"	99	2nd^{^{10}}	Advanced

Sing-off details

Order	Artist	Song	Score	Place	Result
1	Tamires Santana	"Adoro Amar Você"	80	—	Wildcard
2	Karol Carvalho	"Karma Chameleon"	91	1st	Advanced

=== Heat 6 ===
Order	Artist	Song	Score	Place	Result
1	Victhor Vieira	"Se Joga no Passinho"	87	1st	Eliminated
2	Jéssica Gaspar	"Déjà Vu"	88	1st	Eliminated
3	Peter Michael	"Crazy Little Thing Called Love"	99	1st	Advanced
4	Lara Priscila	"Moça"	96	2nd	Eliminated
5	Rapha Dantas	"Você Mudou"	99	2nd^{^{11}}	Advanced
6	Rebecca	"Don't You Worry 'bout a Thing"	98	3rd	Wildcard
7	Fillipe Dom	"Goodbye"	99	2nd^{^{12}}	Advanced
8	Cacau Galvão	"Sufoco"	89	—	Eliminated
9	Neíra Nazareth	"Angel"	96	—	Wildcard
10	Helleno	"The Winner Takes It All"	91	—	Wildcard

Sing-off details

Order	Artist	Song	Score	Place	Result
1	Fillipe Dom	"Deixo"	100	—	Finalist
2	Rapha Dantas	—	—	1st	Advanced

=== Heat 7 ===
Order	Artist	Song	Score	Place	Result
1	Vicarol	"Chora, Me Liga"	61	1st	Eliminated
2	Mari Bannwart	"You Learn"	92	1st	Eliminated
3	Rupa Figueira	"Is This Love"	95	1st	Eliminated
4	Monique Ellyn	"Te Amo Cada Vez Mais"	63	3rd	Eliminated
5	Karina Menasce	"Enter Sandman"	98	1st	Advanced
6	Danilo	"Solidão"	100	—	Finalist
7	Trio Mary's	"Mr. Sandman"	98	3rd^{^{13}}	Advanced
8	Elton Lee	"Êxtase"	83	—	Eliminated
9	Letícia Moraes	"Nesta Rua"	99	1st	Advanced
10	Thais Ribeiro	"Joga Fora"	95	—	Eliminated

Sing-off details

Order	Artist	Song	Score	Place	Result
1	Trio Mary's	"The Lion Sleeps Tonight"	98	—	Wildcard
2	Karina Menasce	"Rock and Roll"	98	1st^{^{14}}	Advanced

=== Heat 8 ===
Order	Artist	Song	Score	Place	Result
1	Luan Carbonari	"Beatriz"	100	—	Finalist
2	Monna	"A Voz do Morro"	97	1st	Eliminated
3	Thielly Lohane	"Who You Are"	98	1st	Advanced
4	Kako	Flowers"	71	3rd	Eliminated
5	Catarina Neves	"Dio, come ti amo"	100	—	Finalist
6	Gui Buxini	"Learn to Fly"	75	3rd	Eliminated
7	Nayra Galvão	"Choram As Rosas"	97	2nd^{^{15}}	Wildcard
8	Dan Murata	"Wherever You Will Go"	89	—	Eliminated
9	Mafê Pescin	"Can't Help Falling in Love"	99	1st	Advanced
10	Cris Lourenzo	"A Loba"	99	1st^{^{16}}	Advanced

Sing-off details

Order	Artist	Song	Score	Place	Result
1	Mafê Pescin	"I Don't Want to Miss a Thing"	93	—	Advanced
2	Thielly Lohane	"One Last Time"	100	—	Finalist

== Wildcard ==
Order	Artist	Song	Score	Place	Result
1	Trio Mary's	"Banho de Lua"	98	1st	Advanced
2	San Oliver	"Earned It"	81	2nd	Eliminated
3	Rebecca	"Diamonds"	97	2nd	Eliminated
4	Neíra Nazareth	"Estoy Aquí"	91	3rd	Eliminated
5	Brunelli	"How Could an Angel Break My Heart"	98	2nd^{^{17}}	Advanced
6	Tamires Santana	"Vermelho"	96	—	Eliminated
7	Mari Brito	"We Are the World"	93	—	Eliminated
8	Daniel Cruz	"Um Dia, Um Adeus"	87	—	Eliminated
9	Nayra Galvão	"Meu Disfarce"	84	—	Eliminated
10	Deborah Passos	"Temporal de Amor"	96	—	Eliminated
11	Helleno	"Who Wants to Live Forever"	100	1st	Advanced

Sing-off details

Order	Artist	Song	Score	Place	Result
1	Brunelli	"Wrecking Ball"	79	—	Eliminated
2	Trio Mary's	"Hit the Road Jack"	100	1st	Advanced

== Semifinals ==
=== Week 1 ===
Order	Artist	Song	Score	Place	Result
1	Jullyana Netto	"É O Amor"	99	1st	Eliminated
2	Helleno	"Listen to Your Heart"	100	1st	Advanced
3	Ju Rosario	"Lovely"	100	2nd^{^{18}}	Advanced
4	Cris Lourenzo	"Minha Metade"	97	—	Eliminated
5	Raphael Viana	"Caruso"	96	—	Eliminated
6	Mafê Pescin	"It Will Rain"	88	—	Eliminated
7	Karol Carvalho	"Um Dia de Domingo"	94	—	Eliminated
8	Ricardinho Martiliano	"Smells Like Teen Spirit"	93	—	Eliminated
9	Marcela Martins	"Andança"	99	3rd^{^{19}}	Advanced

Sing-off details

Order	Artist	Song	Score	Place	Result
1	Ju Rosario	"O Bêbado e a Equilibrista"	94	—	Eliminated
2	Marcela Martins	"Canto das Três Raças"	95	1st	Advanced

=== Week 2 ===
Order	Artist	Song	Score	Place	Result
1	Karina Menasce	"Let It Go"	86	1st	Eliminated
2	Samuca	"Fascinação"	98	1st	Advanced
3	Trio Mary's	"Perigosa"	100	1st	Advanced
4	Peter Michael	"Always on My Mind"	90	3rd	Eliminated
5	Nath Rodrigues	"Caxangá"	79	—	Eliminated
6	Rapha Dantas	"Se Deus Me Ouvisse"	93	3rd	Eliminated
7	Alle	"Bad Romance"	79	—	Eliminated
8	Eduardo Porto	"When a Man Loves a Woman"	83	—	Eliminated
9	Letícia Moraes	"The Sound of Music"	99	2nd	Advanced

Sing-off details

Order	Artist	Song	Score	Place	Result
1	Samuca	"Tudo Passará"	99	1st^{^{20}}	Advanced
2	Letícia Moraes	"Wishing You Were Somehow Here Again"	99	—	Eliminated

== Finals ==
Order	Artist	Song	Score	Place	Result
1	Saulo Soul	"Fora da Lei"	100	1st	Advanced
2	Nathy Moraes	"I'll Be There"	86	2nd	Eliminated
3	Gerard Macapagal	"Aquarela do Brasil"	95	2nd	Eliminated
4	Catarina Neves	"Canteiros"	99	2nd	Eliminated
5	Felipe Santos	"Back at One"	92	—	Eliminated
6	Trio Mary's	"Dancing Queen"	96	3rd	Eliminated
7	Luan Carbonari	"Onde Deus Possa Me Ouvir"	89	—	Eliminated
8	Thielly Lohane	"I Want to Know What Love Is"	100	2nd^{^{21}}	Eliminated
9	Samuca	"As Rosas Não Falam"	100	1st^{^{22}}	Advanced
10	Fillipe Dom	"You Light Up My Life"	99	—	Eliminated
11	Marcela Martins	"Amarelo Azul e Branco"	91	—	Eliminated
12	Danilo	"My All"	94	—	Eliminated
13	Helleno	"Dream On"	100	1st^{^{23}}	Advanced
14	Ariane Wink	"La Foule"	99	—	Eliminated
15	Elriel	"Bed of Roses"	96	—	Eliminated

Sing-off details

Order	Artist	Song	Score	Place	Result
1	Helleno	"Livin' on a Prayer"	100	1st	Winner
2	Samuca	"Negue"	100	2nd	Runner-up
3	Saulo Soul	"Não Vou Ficar"	100	3rd	Third place

Notes

- ^Note 1 : Tie between Nath Rodrigues and Mari Brito for 1st. Nath won 58–42. Alle moved (3rd); Luciano Rissetto eliminated.
- ^Note 2 : Tie between Eduardo Porto and Deborah Passos for 1st. Eduardo won 70–30. Leila moved (3rd); Makaule eliminated.
- ^Note 3 : Leila Santana eliminated as result of a tie between Marcela Martins, Eduardo Porto and Deborah Passos for 1st/2nd; Marcela won 60–40 against Deborah for 2nd, moving her to 3rd; then, Eduardo won 66–34 against Marcela and secured himself in 1st.
- ^Note 4 : Tie between Brunelli, Eduardo Porto, Marcela Martins and Deborah Passos for 1st/2nd/3rd. Brunelli won 56–44 against Deborah for 3rd, thus eliminating her; then, Marcela won 54–46 against Brunelli and secured herself in 2nd.
- ^Note 5 : Tie between Lucinha Alves and Thaiz Lossio for 2nd. Lucinha won 69–31. Davi Muniz was eliminated.
- ^Note 6 : Tie between Jullyana Netto and Raphael Viana for 1st. Jullyana won 72–28. Lucinha moved (3rd); Thaiz Lossio eliminated.
- ^Note 7 : Tie between Samuca and Ju Rosario for 1st. Samuca won 53–47. Rodrigo moved (3rd); San Oliver eliminated.
- ^Note 8 : Tie between Julianna Silva & Antônio Felipe and Matheus Estevão for 3rd. Matheus won 72–28, thus automatically eliminating Julianna Silva & Antônio Felipe.
- ^Note 9 : Tie between Ricardinho Martiliano and Tamires Santana for 1st. Ricardinho won 76–24. Frank moved (3rd); Matheus Estevão eliminated.
- ^Note 10 : Frank Henrique eliminated as result of a tie between Karol Carvalho, Ricardinho Martiliano and Tamires Santana for 1st/2nd; Karol won 60–40 against Tamires for 2nd, moving her to 3rd; Ricardinho won 73–27 against Karol and secured himself in 1st.
- ^Note 11 : Tie between Rapha Dantas and Peter Michael for 1st. Peter won 62–38. Lara moved (3rd); Jéssica Gaspar eliminated.
- ^Note 12 : Rebecca eliminated as result of a tie between Fillipe Dom, Peter Michael and Rapha Dantas for 1st/2nd; Fillipe won 72–28 against Rapha for 2nd, moving him to 3rd; then, Peter won 55–45 against Fillipe and secured himself in 1st.
- ^Note 13 : Tie between Trio Mary's and Karina Menasce for 1st. Karina won 56–44. Rupa moved (3rd); Mari Bannwart eliminated.
- ^Note 14 : Tie between Karina Menasce and Trio Mary's in the Sing-off. Karina won 51–49 and advanced to the semifinals.
- ^Note 15 : Tie between Nayra Galvão and Monna for 2nd. Nayra won 70–30. Gui Buxini was eliminated.
- ^Note 16 : Tie between Cris Lourenzo and Mafê Pescin for 1st. Cris won 60–40 thus advancing. Thielly moved (3rd); Nayra Galvão eliminated.
- ^Note 17 : Tie between Brunelli and Trio Mary's for 1st. Trio Mary's won 53–47. Rebecca moved (3rd); Neíra Nazareth eliminated.
- ^Note 18 : Tie between Ju Rosario and Helleno for 1st. Helleno won 62–38. Jullyana moved (3rd).
- ^Note 19 : Tie between Marcela Martins and Jullyana Netto for 3rd. Marcela won 51–49, thus eliminating Jullyana Netto.
- ^Note 20 : Tie between Letícia Moraes and Samuca in the Sing-off. Samuca won 67–33 thus advancing to the finals.
- ^Note 21 : Tie between Thielly Lohane and Saulo Soul for 1st. Saulo won 52–48. Catarina Neves moved (3rd); Trio Mary's eliminated.
- ^Note 22 : Catarina Neves eliminated as result of a tie between Samuca, Saulo Soul and Thielly Lohane for 1st/2nd; Samuca won 55–45 against Thielly for 2nd, moving her to 3rd; Samuca won 56–44 against Saulo for 1st.
- ^Note 23 : Tie between Helleno, Samuca, Saulo Soul and Thielly Lohane for 1st/2nd/3rd. Helleno won 74–26 against Thielly for 3rd, thus eliminating her; Helleno won 81–19 against the Saulo for 2nd, moving him to 3rd; Helleno won 78–22 against Samuca for 1st.

== Elimination chart ==
Key

Winner
Runner-up
Third place

Advanced
In sing-off

Immunity
Eliminated

Artist	Semifinals 1		Semifinals 2		Finals	
Artist	Qualifying	Sing-off	Qualifying	Sing-off	Qualifying	Sing-off
Helleno	1st 100 points	Immune			1st 100 points	Winner; 51.39%
Samuca			3rd 98 points	1st 99 points	2nd 100 points	Runner-up; 36.19%
Saulo Soul					3rd 100 points	Third place 12.42%
Thielly Lohane					4th 100 points	
Ariane Wink					5th–7th 99 points	
Catarina Neves					5th–7th 99 points	
Fillipe Dom					5th–7th 99 points	
Elriel					8th 98 points	
Trio Mary's			1st 100 points	Immune	9th 96 points	
Gerard Macapagal					10th 95 points	
Danilo					11th 94 points	
Felipe Santos					12th 92 points	
Marcela Martins	3rd 99 points	1st 95 points			13th 91 points	
Luan Carbonari					14th 89 points	
Nathy Moraes					15th 86 points	
Letícia Moraes			2nd 99 points	2nd 99 points		
Rapha Dantas			4th 93 points			
Peter Michael			5th 90 points			
Karina Menasce			6th 86 points			
Eduardo Porto			7th 83 points			
Alle			8th–9th 79 points			
Nath Rodrigues			8th–9th 79 points			
Ju Rosario	2nd 100 points	2nd 94 points				
Jullyana Netto	4th 99 points					
Cris Lourenzo	5th 97 points					
Raphael Viana	6th 96 points					
Karol Carvalho	7th 94 points					
Ricardinho Martiliano	8th 93 points					
Mafê Peccin	9th 88 points					

== Ratings and reception ==
=== Brazilian ratings ===
All numbers are in points and provided by Kantar Ibope Media.

Episode	Title	Air date	Timeslot (BRT)	SP viewers (in points)	Source
1	Heat 1	April 9, 2023	Sunday 6:30 p.m.	7.2	
2	Heat 2	April 16, 2023	Sunday 6:00 p.m.	5.2	
3	Heat 3	April 23, 2023	Sunday 6:00 p.m.	5.7	
4	Heat 4	April 30, 2023	Sunday 6:00 p.m.	5.3	
5	Heat 5	May 7, 2023	Sunday 6:00 p.m.	6.5	
6	Heat 6	May 14, 2023	Sunday 6:00 p.m.	5.0	
7	Heat 7	May 21, 2023	Sunday 6:00 p.m.	6.6	
8	Heat 8	May 28, 2023	Sunday 6:00 p.m.	6.9	
9	Wildcard	June 4, 2023	Sunday 6:00 p.m.	7.1	
10	Semifinals 1	June 11, 2023	Sunday 6:00 p.m.	6.3	
11	Semifinals 2	June 18, 2023	Sunday 6:00 p.m.	7.9	
12	Finals	June 25, 2023	Sunday 6:00 p.m.		

- In 2023, each point represents 268.083 households in 15 market cities in Brazil (76.953 households in São Paulo).
