= Eine Insel für zwei =

1961 German single by Connie Francis

Single by Connie Francis
- B-side: "Das ist zuviel"
- Released: 1961
- Recorded: A-side: March 15, 1961; B-Side: October 5, 1961 both at Austrophon Studio, Vienna
- Genre: Schlager
- Length: 2:11
- Label: MGM 61 050
- Songwriters: Charly Niessen, Joachim Relin
- Producer: Gerhard Mendelsohn

Connie Francis German singles chronology
"Einmal komm' ich wieder" (1961)	"Eine Insel für zwei" (1961)	"Lili Marleen" (1962)

Eine Insel für zwei is the sixth German single recorded by U. S. entertainer Connie Francis.

== Overview ==
The A-side featured a song written especially in German by Charly Niessen and Joachim Relin, who would also write Wanda Jackson's chart-topping German language debut single "Santo Domingo" in 1965.

== Das ist zuviel ==
The song on the B-Side was "Das ist zuviel", a German coverversion of Francis' U. S. Hit "Too Many Rules", which she also recorded in

- French (as Faut pas faire, ça)
- Italian (as Mary Lou, a. k. a. E' Mary Lou)
- Japanese (as Too Many Rules [the original English title was kept])
- Portuguese (as Ordens demais)
- Spanish (as Tanto Control)

The Japanese version reached No. 1 in Japan. The English version was included in her 1962 album Connie Francis Sings Second Hand Love, and the other versions didn't chart.

== Charts ==
Eine Insel für zwei peaked at No. 7 of the German charts and No. 4 on Austrian charts.

Year	Title	AUT	GER
1961	"Eine Insel für zwei"	4	7
