= Schöner fremder Mann =

Single by Connie Francis
- B-side: "Funiculì, Funiculà"
- Released: 1961
- Recorded: March 15, 1961 at Austrophon Studio, Vienna
- Genre: Rock and roll, schlager
- Length: 2:42
- Label: MGM 61 042
- Songwriters: Athina Hosey, Hal Gordon, Jean Nicolas
- Producer: Gerhard Mendelsohn

Connie Francis German singles chronology
""Wenn ich träume"/ "Niemand"" (1961)	"Schöner fremder Mann" (1961)	""Einmal komm' ich wieder"/ "Immer und überall"" (1961)

Schöner fremder Mann is the fourth German single recorded by U. S. entertainer Connie Francis.

The song is the German cover version of Francis' U. S. recording Someone Else's Boy. Although the original version didn't chart, it became one of Francis' biggest international successes, and it is the only song in her repertoire she recorded in eight languages:

- English
- German
- French (as Celui que je veux)
- Italian (as Ti conquisterò)
- Spanish (as El novio de otra, a. k. a. Mi tonto amor)
- Portuguese (as Um amor so meu)
- Dutch (as Jij bent niet van mij)
- Japanese (as 夢のデイト - Yume no Deito).

Schöner fremder Mann became Francis' biggest hit to date in West Germany, peaking at # 1.

The B-side of the single was Funiculì, Funiculà, an Italian recording from her U. S. album More Italian Favorites.

Schöner fremder Mann was Francis' last single in West Germany to feature a foreign language song on the B-side. All subsequent singles would feature German-language recordings on both sides.

The song is featured at the end of West German director Rainer Werner Fassbinder's 1978 film In a Year of 13 Moons.
