= Gugu Liberato =

Brazilian television presenter (1959–2019)

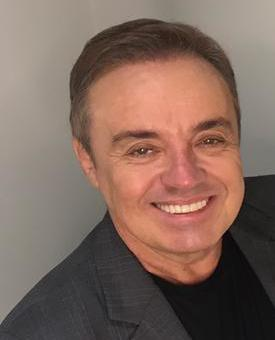
- Gugu in 2019
- Born: Antônio Augusto de Moraes Liberato; 10 April 1959; São Paulo, São Paulo, Brazil
- Died: 21 November 2019 (aged 60); Greater Orlando, Florida, U.S.
- Occupations: Television presenter; businessman; singer; actor; producer
- Partner: Rose Miriam di Matteo (2001–2019)
- Children: 3

Antônio Augusto de Moraes Liberato (10 April 1959 – 21 November 2019), better known as Gugu Liberato or simply Gugu, was a Brazilian television presenter, entrepreneur, actor and singer. He is regarded as one of the most famous entertainers in the history of Brazilian television, standing next to names like Faustão, Silvio Santos, Hebe Camargo and Xuxa. His rise to fame began in 1982 when he began co-hosting the Saturday night show Viva a Noite.

== Early life ==
Liberato was born in São Paulo, Brazil, the son of Portuguese immigrants. He used to write letters to Silvio Santos (who later hired him) suggesting ideas for programs. He started on television at age 14 as program production assistant on Domingo no Parque (Sunday at the Park), presented by Silvio Santos on SBT.

== Career ==
Liberato began studying dentistry at University of Marilia (Unimar) in Marilia, São Paulo, but dropped out when called by Silvio Santos, who invited him to take up a post in front of the cameras. One of his first programs in 1981 was the Sessão Premiada São Paulo – Rio's version was by Paul Barboza. In 1982, Santos asked Argentine director Nelly Raymond to create a program for Saturday night. Viva a Noite was created, which was initially divided into several parts, and also presented by Ademar Dutra, Mariette Detotto and Jair Ogun. Following some format changes, Gugu remained alone in the program, then directed by Homer Salles. While anchoring Viva a Noite, Gugu also directed Domingo no Parque for sometime and acted as the editor for the President's Week (Semana do Presidente) newsletter, which was aired in the commercial breaks between the Program Silvio Santos show.

After the success of the musical group Menudo, which was extensively promoted by Viva a Noite in 1984, Gugu launched Brazilian musical groups of the same style, such as Dominó and Polegar, becoming a successful businessman.

In August 1987, at the height of the success of Viva a noite, Gugu signed a contract with TV station Rede Globo. But on Saturday Carnival 1988, Santos went to meet the owner of Rede Globo, Roberto Marinho, personally, in order to release the presenter so he could stay on SBT. Santos was about to undergo a delicate surgery and made a millionaire proposal to Gugu, offering him much of the Sunday's programming schedule. As a comparison, Liberato's wages increased tenfold, besides earnings coming from advertising.

Liberato debuted on SBT on Sundays on 17 April 1988, hosting alone programs like Passa ou Repassa and Cidade Contra Cidade. Gugu also co-hosted Roletrando (Brazilian version of Wheel of Fortune, also as the predecessor of Roda a Roda) with Santos.

Rede Globo, however, had already created a program for Gugu, and the program was ready but without a host. Rede Globo hired hastily Fausto Silva, who ran the Saturday late night show Perdidos na Noite (Lost in the Night) at TV Bandeirantes. So the show Domingão do Faustão started, by chance, on Sunday afternoons at Rede Globo, filling a schedule previously occupied by American TV series.

Even though Gugu was responsible for part of the Sunday programming, he remained anchoring shows on Saturday night, especially musical programs like Sabadão Sertanejo. The greatest success, however, came with the show Domingo Legal, which competed with Domingão do Faustão, ironically a program created to be his. The competition in the late 1990s was for a long period favorable to Gugu, which ended the decade with peaks above 40 rating points.

== Personal life and death ==
Liberato had a domestic partnership with physician Rose Miriam di Matteo, with whom he had three children.

On November 20th, 2019, Liberato suffered an accident at his home in Windermere, Greater Orlando, while trying to change the filter on his home's air conditioner; he fell from the roof of his home and hit his head. He was admitted to Orlando Health and it was reported that his condition was critical. Rumors of his death were initially denied, but 2 days later, it was confirmed that Liberato had died.

== Filmography ==
=== Television ===
Year	Title	Notes	Network
1981–1982	Sessão Premiada		SBT
1982	A Descida do Papai Noel	End of year special	SBT
1982–1992	Viva a Noite		SBT
1986–1988	Parada do Dia das Crianças	Annual Children's Day Special	SBT
1988	Domingugu	Canceled program	Rede Globo
1988	Roletrando		SBT
1988–1989	Cidade contra Cidade		SBT
1988–1995	Passa ou Repassa		SBT
1989	Adivinhe Se Puder		SBT
1989–1993	TV Animal		SBT
1989–1991	Corrida Maluca		SBT
1991–1992	Big Domingo		SBT
1991–2002	Sabadão (or Sabadão Sertanejo)		SBT
1992	Programa de Vídeos		SBT
1992	Super Paradão	End of year special	SBT
1992–1993	Nações Unidas		SBT
1993	Play Game		SBT
1993	Domingugu		SBT
1993–2009	Domingo Legal		SBT
1994	Noite dos Artistas		SBT
1994–1995	Paradão Sertanejo		SBT
1996	Parque do Gugu	End of year special	SBT
1998-2008, 2015; 2017	Teleton		SBT
2000	TV Ano 50	Special 50 years of Brazilian TV	Rede Globo
2002–2003	Disco de Ouro		SBT
2009–2013	Programa do Gugu		RecordTV
2015–2017	Gugu		RecordTV
2018–2019	Power Couple Brasil		RecordTV
2018–2019	Canta Comigo		RecordTV

=== Film ===
Year	Title	Role
1984	Padre Pedro e a Revolta das Crianças	Padre Sebastião
1987	Os Fantasmas Trapalhões	Delegate Augusto
1988	O Casamento dos Trapalhões	Himself
1989	Os Trapalhões na Terra dos Monstros	Himself
1990	Uma Escola Atrapalhada	Chopin Luís
1997	O Noviço Rebelde	Himself
2001	Xuxa e os Duendes	Rich

== Discography ==
- 1983 - Gugu
- 1984 - Gugu
- 1985 - Gugu Liberato
- 1986 - Gugu Liberato
- 1989 - Gugu
- 1989 - Viva a Noite
- 1990 - Viva a Noite
- 1991 - Gugu Liberato Apresenta: Bailão Sertanejo
- 1992 - Gugu Liberato Apresenta: Bailão Sertanejo 2
- 1994 - Gugu
- 1996 - Parque do Gugu
- 1998 - Gugu Cantando Com Você
- 2002 - Gugu Para Crianças
