= A Letter from a Soldier (Dear Mama) =

Single by Connie Francis
- B-side: "Somewhere, My Love"
- Released: June 1966
- Recorded: May 31, 1966
- Genre: Pop
- Length: 2:50
- Label: MGM; K13545
- Songwriters: Ray Allen; Wandra Merrell
- Producer: Tom Wilson

Connie Francis singles chronology
"It's a Different World" (1966)	"A Letter from a Soldier (Dear Mama)" (1966)	"Summer Samba (So Nice)" (1966)

Professional ratings
Review scores
Source	Rating
Billboard	Positive (Spotlight)
Cashbox	Positive (Pick of the Week)

"A Letter from a Soldier (Dear Mama)" is a song written by Ray Allen and Wandra Merrell, most notably performed by Connie Francis, who released it as a single under MGM Records in mid 1966, with a positive reception and minor chart presence. The song is about a soldier who had written a letter to his mother at the height of the Vietnam war. Francis toured South Vietnam to support the local US soldiers there in 1967.

== Connie Francis version ==
=== Release and critical reception ===
Following the relative failure of the rocker "It's a Different World" Francis would release "A Letter from a Soldier (Dear Mama)" as a seven-inch single in June 1966 under MGM Records. It was backed by another ballad, "Somewhere, My Love" on the B-side, which was included in her 1966 studio album Somewhere, My Love released internationally, and the 1966 album Movie Greats of the 60s, which charted in the US. Larry Wilcox conducted the orchestra for both songs, which were recorded on May 31, 1966. The producer was Tom Wilson as on "It's a Different World". In the same session, France recorded a promotional single for US army nurses during a shortage of them because of the Vietnam war.

The single was met with a positive critical reception upon its release. Billboard magazine said that the "Slow-building, dramatic lyric ballad is given a warm, emotional reading by Miss Francis for a chart-topping entry." Cashbox reviewed the single in late July and wrote that "The side is a slow-moving but effectively-building heart throbbingly plaintive dramatic ode about a G.I. in Vietnam who still values his mother's love." They added that "Somewhere My Love" gets a "lyrical, heartfelt reading on the coupler."

=== Chart performance ===
"A Letter from a Soldier (Dear Mama)" debuted on the Billboard Bubbling Under the Hot 100 on July 8, 1966, peaking at No. 105 during a three-week run on it. The single was ranked lower on the Cashbox Looking Ahead, where it reached the No. 119 position. Simiraly, on the Record World Coming-Up Singles chart, where it reached No. 119.

The single's B-side, "Somewhere, My Love", outperformed "A Letter from a Soldier (Dear Mama)" internationally as it was the A-side in every territory the song was released in except the US and the Philippines.

=== Track listing ===
7" single (MGM K13545, 1966)
No.	Title	Writer(s)	Performance rights handled by	Length
1.	"A Letter from a Soldier (Dear Mama)"	Ray Allen; Wandra Merrell	Broadcast Music, Inc.	2:20
2.	"Somewhere, My Love"	Maurice Jarre	ASCAP	2:28

== Charts ==
Chart performance for "A Letter from a Soldier (Dear Mama)"
Chart (1966)	Peak position
US Billboard Bubbling Under Hot 100	105
US Cashbox Looking Ahead	119
US Record World Singles Coming-Up	119
