= Jealous Heart (disambiguation) =

"Jealous Heart" is a song by American country singer-songwriter Jenny Lou Carson.

"Jealous Heart" may also refer to:

- Jealous Heart (Connie Francis album), 1966
- Jealous Heart, album by Mark Templeton, 2013
- "Jealous Heart", song by Máire Brennan from the album Máire, 1992
