= Whose Heart Are You Breaking Tonight? =

Single by Connie Francis

from the album Connie Francis Sings "For Mama"
- B-side: "Come On, Jerry"
- Released: January 1965
- Recorded: January 3, 1964, New York City, NY
- Genre: Vocal
- Length: 2:21
- Label: MGM; 13303
- Songwriters: Ted Murry, Benny Davis
- Producer: Danny Davis

Connie Francis singles chronology
"Don't Ever Leave Me" (1964)	"Whose Heart Are You Breaking Tonight?" (1965)	"For Mama" (1965)

"Whose Heart Are You Breaking Tonight?" is a song written by Ted Murry and Benny Davis and most notably performed by Connie Francis.

== Connie Francis version ==
=== Release and reception ===
"Whose Heart Are You Breaking Tonight?" was released as a seven-inch single in January 1965 by MGM Records. It was backed by "Come On, Jerry" on the B-side. The song was included as the seventh track on Francis' 1965 album, Connie Francis Sings "For Mama". It was later translated into Italian as "Un altro amore" and was the B-side to her Italian single "Ho bisogno di vederti".

In its positive review of the single Cashbox magazine stated that "Connie Francis could start off '65 with a blockbuster", continuing "'Whose Heart Are You Breaking Tonight,' is a tearful sentimental beat ballad-with triplets that she delivers with expected warmth and poise. The flip's tantalizing 'Fever' styled finger-snapper that also merits special attention.

=== Chart performance ===
In early 1965 the song broke into the top ten on the U.S. Easy Listening chart, peaking at No. 7 on it. It reached No. 43 on the Billboard Hot 100 chart as well. It was ranked lower by Record World at No. 45, and higher by Cashbox at No. 42. It also charted in Australia, peaking at No. 56 in the country.

=== Track listing ===
7" vinyl single

- "Whose Heart Are You Breaking Tonight?" - 2:21
- "Come On, Jerry" – 1:54

== Charts ==
Chart performance for "Whose Heart Are You Breaking Tonight?"
Chart (1965)	Peak position
US Billboard Hot 100	43
US Easy Listening (Billboard)	7
US Record World 100 Top Pops	45
US Cashbox Top 100 Singles	42
AUS Top 100 Singles (Kent Music Report)	56
