= There's Still a Few Good Love Songs Left in Me =

1983 single by Connie Francis

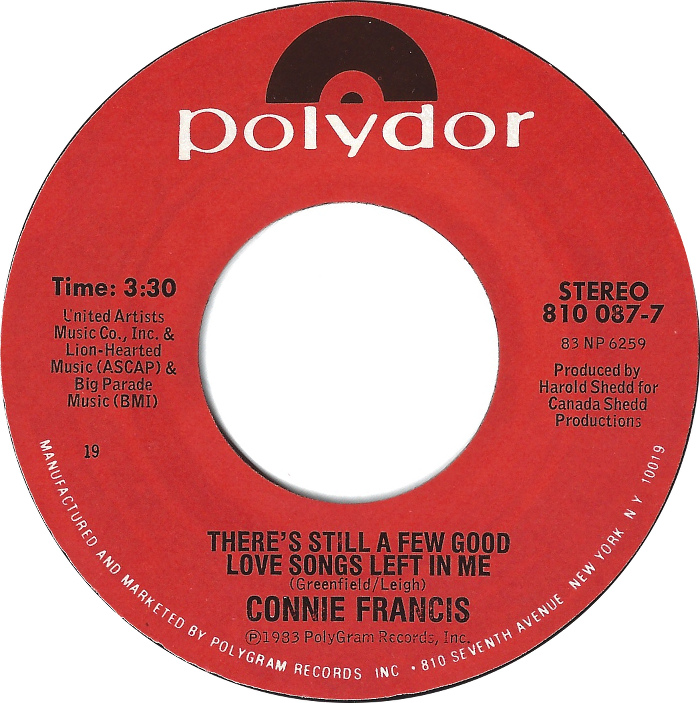

Single by Connie Francis
- B-side: "Let's Make It Love Tonight"
- Released: January 1983
- Recorded: 1982, Music Mill Studio, Nashville.
- Genre: Country
- Length: A-side - 3:30; B-side – 3:38
- Label: Polydor; 810 087-7
- Lyricists: Greenfield and Leigh
- Producer: Harold Shedd

Connie Francis singles chronology
"I'm Me Again" (1981)	"There's Still a Few Good Love Songs Left in Me" (1983)

"There's Still a Few Good Love Songs Left in Me" is a song recorded by American entertainer Connie Francis and released as a single in January 1983. It was written by Greenfield and Leigh. It was her final original US single, and her final country chart appearance as well.

== Background ==
After more or less healing from depression, Connie Francis returned to the studio in 1980 to cut "Comme ci, comme ça" and "I'm Me Again", the latter of which became the title track of an album which featured the new songs. This also meant that she would return to her first label, MGM, which she had left 10 years earlier. The song marked a return to the Adult Contemporary charts (No. 40). Although, the success was short-lived and her brother was murdered soon after, which forced her to leave the stage and recording again.

== Recording and release ==
This time, Francis returned to the studio in the spring of 1982 to cut "There's Still a Few Good Love Songs Left in Me" and "Let's Make It Love Tonight". Under the production of Harold Shedd in Music Mill Studio, Nashville, the single was released in January 1983 by Polydor Records (cat. no. 810 087-7).

Francis was reportedly "genuinely excited" about returning to the music industry. She highlighted the "people-oriented" approach taken in Nashville. Although remembered as and being a pop singer from the 1950s and 1960s, Francis liked the country "feel" and so decided to go to Nashville for the new single. Francis noted that the Nashville players gave her back "a sense of confidence" that she had almost lost before she began the sessions with producer Harold Shedd.

== Chart performance ==
"There's Still a Few Good Love Songs Left in Me" debuted in Billboard magazine's Hot Country Songs chart in the issue dated March 12, 1983, peaking at No. 84 during a three-week run on it. The single debuted in Cashbox magazine's Top 100 Country Singles chart in the issue dated also March 12, 1983, reaching No. 79 during a four week run on it. This would be Francis' third and final appearance on the country charts, following "The Wedding Cake" in 1969.

== Charts ==
Chart peaks for "There's Still a Few Good Love Songs Left in Me"
Chart (1983)	Peak position
US Billboard Hot Country Songs	84
US Cashbox Top 100 Country Singles	79
