= Somewhere, My Love =

Somewhere, My Love may refer to:

- Somewhere, My Love (album), 1966 album by Connie Francis
- "Lara's Theme", theme composed by Maurice Jarre for Doctor Zhivago (1965)
  - "Somewhere, My Love", a vocal arrangement of "Lara's Theme", notably recorded by Ray Conniff

== See also ==
- Somewhere My Love and Other Great Hits, a 1966 album by Ray Conniff
