= Connie Francis Sings "For Mama" =

Studio album by Connie Francis
- Released: March 1965
- Recorded: 1962, 1965
- Genre: Vocal pop
- Length: 32 minutes 26 seconds
- Labels: MGM; E-4294/SE-4294
- Producer: Danny Davis

Connie Francis chronology
Connie Francis and Hank Williams Jr. Sing Great Country Favorites (1964)	Connie Francis Sings "For Mama" (1965)	Connie Francis Sings All-Time International Hits (1965)

Singles from Connie Francis Sings "For Mama"
- 1. "I Was Such a Fool (To Fall in Love with You)" Released: September 1962; 2. "Whose Heart Are You Breaking Tonight?" Released: January 1965; 3. "For Mama (La mamma)" Released: February 1965

Connie Francis Sings "For Mama" is the twenty-eighth studio album by American singer Connie Francis, released in March 1965 by MGM Records. The project saw her continue recording with producer Danny Davis. Connie Francis Sings "For Mama" was met with a mostly positive critical reception, and made the lower half of the charts.

== Background ==
In 1965 Connie Francis was still recording ballads, and one of them, "For Mama (La mamma)" arranged by Don Costa, would be released in February 1965 with a positive reception. It made brief pop and easy listening chart appearances. For Connie Francis Sings "For Mama", Francis would continue recording with producer Danny Davis, and take songs by Ted Murry and Benny Davis, who had provided her a No. 1 hit via "Don't Break the Heart That Loves You" three years earlier. The director of engineering was Val Valentin, who would later produce her 1967 Love, Italian Style album, and be the director of engineering on other ones.

== Recording and content ==
Connie Francis Sings "For Mama" was recorded and compiled soon after the hit single "For Mama". The album contained a total of 12 tracks, with six songs on side one and six on side two, with the album being 32 minutes and 26 seconds long. Whilst side one consisted of some cover songs, side two only had Francis originals. Included songs were "What Kind of Fool Am I?" from the musical Stop the World – I Want to Get Off, which she had been performing to live audiences as early as 1962, "No One", a previous hit song for her in 1960, although the version used for the album was the later cut third recording, and "No One Ever Sends Me Roses", which would later form the B-side to two of her singles. Some originals were "No Better Off", "Playin' Games" (written by the writers of her hit I'm Gonna Be Warm This Winter), "You're The Only One Can Hurt Me", and "It's Gonna Take Some Time".

== Critical reception ==
Professional ratings
Review scores
Source	Rating
Encyclopedia of Popular Music	3/5 stars
Billboard	Positive (Spotlight)
Cashbox	Positive (Pop Picks)
Record World	Positive (Pick Hits)

Connie Francis Sings "For Mama" was given a positive critical response following its release. Billboard magazine named the album among its "Pop Spotlight" albums in mid April, 1965, highlighting its commercial and pop aspects, writing "Based on her recent single successes, this package contains an additional 10 tunes performed in the familiar Francis style. 'No One Ever Sends Me Roses' has single hit possibilities. Other original material contained is well performed and arranged. Another winning LP." Cashbox magazine stated that it was a "powerful package linking Connie Francis’ latest hit, 'For Mama' and her recent noise maker 'Whose Heart Are You Breaking Tonight' with ten other potent tunes", noting that it made its debut last week and should climb onto the best-seller lists in no time flat." The magazine also said that "The lark’s handling of these pop items is gorgeous, and fitted as well to 'good music' programming as to 'top 40' schedules. This is a set which will appeal to all age groups and very strongly. Watch it take-off." Record World magazine believed that Francis was on her top form; "Mama will love and papa will love and so will relations of other shapes and sizes, because Connie has a tune to please all. Gal is at the top of her form on 'For Mama,' 'No One Ever Sends Me Roses,' 'Whose Heart are You Breaking Tonight.' Will pull tears from the list of sad tunes." It was given a three-star rating by the Encyclopedia of Popular Music as well.

== Release, chart performance and singles ==
Connie Francis Sings "For Mama" was released by MGM Records in March 1965 and was the twenty-eight studio album of her career. The album was offered as a vinyl LP. Three singles were included on the project, although none of their B-sides appeared on the album. The first was a three-year-old single at that point, "I Was Such a Fool (To Fall in Love with You)", issued in September 1962. The song rose to the number 24 position on the US Hot 100 chart in 1962, but was ranked higher in Cashbox, reaching number 18 on their Top 100 Singles chart. The track also reached number 32 in Canada. Another single included was "Whose Heart Are You Breaking Tonight?", highlighted on the album cover. The song narrowly missed the Top 40, peaking at number 43 and number 42 on the Billboard and Cashbox charts respectively. It also made the Top 10 on the Billboard Easy Listening chart, reaching number 7. The final single was "For Mama (La mamma)", which would only reach number 48 on the Billboard Hot 100, but reached the Top 40 on both Cashbox (No. 35) and Record World (No. 30).

The album achieved modest success on the LP charts, reaching the lower half of the rankings. The album debuted on Billboard magazine's Top LP's chart in the issue dated May 1, 1965, peaking at No. 78 during a fifteen-week run on the chart. It also debuted on Cashbox magazine's Top 100 Albums chart in the issue dated May 22, 1965, peaking at No. 89 during a five-week run on the chart. The album entered the Record World 100 Top LP's chart in the issue dated May 8, 1965, and peaked at No. 74 during an eight-week run on the chart.

== Track listing ==
Side one
No.	Title	Writer(s)	Length
1.	"For Mama (La mamma)"	Charles Aznavour; Robert Gall	2:56
2.	"What Kind of Fool Am I?"	Leslie Bricusse; Anthony Newley	2:56
3.	"No One Ever Sends Me Roses"	Ted Murry; Benny Davis	2:22
4.	"I Was Such a Fool (To Fall in Love with You)"	Michael Canosa; Danny Stradella	2:45
5.	"No One"	Doc Pomus; Mort Shuman	2:45
6.	"You're The Only One Can Hurt Me"	Ted Murry; Benny Davis	2:30

Side two
No.	Title	Writer(s)	Length
1.	"Whose Heart Are You Breaking Tonight?"	Ted Murry; Benny Davis	2:21
2.	"No Better Off"	Bert Keyes; Bob Elgin	2:44
3.	"It Takes More"	Benjamin; Marcus	2:27
4.	"Souvenirs"	Herd; Mark Barkan	2:06
5.	"Playin' Games"	Hank Hunter; Mark Barkan	2:15
6.	"It's Gonna Take Some Time"	Don Christopher; Don Stirling; Gary Weston	2:49

== Chart performance ==
Chart performance for Connie Francis Sings "For Mama"
Chart (1965)	Peak position
US Billboard Top LPs	78
US Cashbox Top 100 Albums	89
US Record World 100 Top LP's	74

=== Singles ===
Year	Single	Chart	Peak position
1962	I Was Such a Fool (To Fall in Love with You)	US Billboard Hot 100	24
1962	I Was Such a Fool (To Fall in Love with You)	US Billboard Easy Listening	8
1962	I Was Such a Fool (To Fall in Love with You)	US Cashbox Top 100 Singles	18
1962	I Was Such a Fool (To Fall in Love with You)	US Record World 100 Top Pops	19
1962	I Was Such a Fool (To Fall in Love with You)	Canada CHUM Hit Parade	32
1965	Whose Heart Are You Breaking Tonight?	US Billboard Hot 100	43
1965	Whose Heart Are You Breaking Tonight?	US Cashbox Top 100 Singles	42
1965	Whose Heart Are You Breaking Tonight?	US Record World 100 Top Pops	45
1965	Whose Heart Are You Breaking Tonight?	US Billboard Easy Listening	7
1965	For Mama (La mamma)	US Billboard Hot 100	48
1965	For Mama (La mamma)	US Cashbox Top 100 Singles	35
1965	For Mama (La mamma)	US Record World 100 Top Pops	30
1965	For Mama (La mamma)	US Billboard Easy Listening	11

== Personnel ==
=== Technical ===
- Producer: Danny Davis
- Director of Engineering: Val Valentin

=== Other ===
- Design: Acy R. Lehman
- Painting: Tony Kokinos
