= Wishing It Was You =

Single by Connie Francis
- B-side: "You're Mine (Just When You're Lonely)"
- Released: April 1965
- Genre: Vocal
- Length: 2:54
- Label: MGM; K 13331
- Songwriters: Clyde Otis; Joy Byers
- Producer: Danny Davis

Connie Francis singles chronology
"For Mama" (1965)	"Wishing It Was You" (1965)	"Forget Domani" (1965)

Professional ratings
Review scores
Source	Rating
Record World	4/5 stars
Billboard	Positive (Spotlight Pick)
Cashbox	Positive (Pick of the Week)

"Wishing It Was You" is a song written by Clyde Otis and Joy Byers and most popularly performed by Connie Francis. The song is about a woman who is getting married but wishes to marry a different man.

== Connie Francis version ==
=== Release and reception ===
"Wishing It Was You" was released as a seven-inch single in April 1965 by MGM Records. It was backed by the English version of her 1965 San Remo Festival entry, "You're Mine (Just When You're Lonely)" on the B-side,, the Italian version was released as a single in Italy and also finished number 5 in the festival's final rankings. Both tracks were arranged by Billy Mure and produced by country instrumentalist Danny Davis.

The single received a positive critical reception upon its release. Billboard magazine shortly stated that is it a "ballad with effective lyric and narration. Fine, heartfelt Francis reading." Cashbox reviewed the single in late April and stated that "Connie Francis, who had a nice piece of the "For Mama" pie last time out, should reach the charts in no time flat with this commercial MGM newie labeled “Wishing It Was You.'" Continuing that "The tune is an easy-going, shuffle-beat romantic lament about an unfortunate gal who ends up with a fella who is decidedly wrong for her." The magazine also said that the flip is a "hauntingly lovely emotion-packed ballad sold with loads of authority and poise by the lark." Record World gave the single four stars and said that it is a "One of Connie's best ever. About a girl marrying the wrong guy. Thrush weeps it out."

=== Chart performance ===
In 1965, the track reached No. 14 on the US Billboard Easy Listening chart and No. 57 on the Billboard Hot 100. On the Cashbox Top 100 Singles chart the single peaked at No. 49 and on the Record World 100 Top Pops chart it reached No. 51. In the Philippines, it spent at least five weeks at No. 1 on the national chart in December 1965.

=== Track listing ===
7" vinyl single

- "Wishing It Was You" - 2:54
- "You're Mine (Just When You're Lonely)" – 2:56

== Other versions ==
Prior to Francis' recording, Anita Bryant released a version as the B-side to her 1962 single, "A' Sleeping at the Foot of the Bed". In the Philippines, the track reached No. 5 on the national chart in early 1963.

== Charts ==
Chart performance for "Wishing It Was You" by Connie Francis
Chart (1965)	Peak position
US Billboard Hot 100	57
US Billboard Easy Listening	14
US Cashbox Top 100 Singles	49
US Record World 100 Top Pops	51
Philippines Top Singles (Billboard)	1

Chart performance for "Wishing It Was You" by Anita Bryant
Chart (1963)	Peak position
Philippines Top Singles (Billboard)	5
