= La mamma (song) =

1962 popular song

Single by Charles Aznavour

from the album La mamma
- Released: 1963
- Genre: Chanson
- Length: 3.43
- Label: Barclay
- Songwriters: Charles Aznavour, Robert Gall

Charles Aznavour singles chronology
"Devi sapere" (1962)	"La mamma" (1963)	"Vita Mia" (1963)

"La mamma", also known as "For Mama" in English, is a song written in 1962 by French lyricist Robert Gall and Armenian-French artist Charles Aznavour.

== History ==
Charles Aznavour first recorded "La mamma" for a 1962 EP with his version serving as title cut for his 1963 album release. The first single release was by Les Compagnons de la chanson which reached #80 on the French charts in late 1963: the Aznavour version was then issued as a single to reach #1 in France in February 1964. "La mamma" also afforded Aznavour a hit on the Dutch charts of Belgium and, rendered in Italian, was a hit in Italy for both Aznavour (#13) and also Domenico Modugno (#36). "La mamma" became Aznavour's first million seller.

An English-language rendering of "La mamma" by lyricist Don Black entitled "For Mama" was recorded by Matt Monro and released in December 1964 in the UK where it had a chart peak of #36. "For Mama" became a minor US hit in 1965 for Jerry Vale whose version debuted on the Hot 100 in Billboard magazine dated March 6, 1965 at #88 (Vale): in the previous issue of Billboard, that dated February 27, 1965, the Matt Monro version of "For Mama" had appeared in the "Bubbling Under Hot 100 Singles" chart at #135 along with the Jerry Vale version at #121, but Monro's version did not subsequently advance into the Hot 100. Jerry Vale's version of "For Mama" rose to a peak of #54 (Vale) on the Hot 100 dated April 3, 1965. Vic Damone also recorded a cover version of "For Mama" which failed to chart.

== Charts ==
Weekly chart performance for "La mamma”
Chart (1963–64)	Peak position
Belgium (Ultratop 50 Flanders)	15
Belgium (Ultratop 50 Wallonia)	2

== Connie Francis' version ==
"For Mama"
- German release cover, April 1965

Single by Connie Francis

from the album Connie Francis Sings "For Mama"
- B-side: "She'll Be Comin' 'Round the Mountain"
- Released: February 1965
- Length: 3:25
- Label: MGM Records
- Songwriter: Black-Aznavour-Gall
- Producer: Danny Davis

Connie Francis singles chronology
"Whose Heart Are You Breaking Tonight?" (1965)	"For Mama" (1965)	"Wishing It Was You" (1965)

Connie Francis' recording of "For Mama" was released as a single in early 1965 and became a minor hit in the United States, peaking at No. 48 on the Billboard Hot 100, but it did way better on the Billboard Easy Listening chart, peaking at No. 11 there. It also did well on other American charts, reaching No. 35 on Cashbox, and No. 30 on Record World's 100 Top Pops chart. In the Philippines, the single reached No. 2 on the national chart. With the new success, she released an album titled Connie Francis Sings "For Mama", which reached No. 78 on the Billboard Top LPs. Both the album and the single were produced by Danny Davis.

=== Charts ===
Chart (1965)	Peak position
US Billboard Hot 100	48
US Billboard Easy Listening	11
US Record World 100 Top Pops	30
US Cashbox Top 100 Singles	35
Philippines Top Singles (Billboard)	2

== Adaptations ==
- La mamma, written by Nelly Byl (Dutch)
- La mamma, written by Gerrit den Braber (Dutch)
- Mamãe, written by Nazareno de Brito (Portuguese)
- For Mama, written by Don Black (English)
- Mama, written by Dragutin Britvić (Croatian)
- La mamma, written by Mogol (Italian)
- La mamma, written by Charly Niessen (German)
- Den bompa, written by Leo Rozenstraten (Brabantian dialect of Antwerp)
- Ya yemma, written by Lili Boniche (Algerian Arabic)
- La mama, written by Rafael Gayoso, sung by Peret (Spanish) - 1964
- Mama, written by Odysseas Ioannou, sung by Vasilis Papakonstantinou (Greek)

== Cover versions ==
- Dalida
- Matt Monro (For Mama)
- De Strangers (Den bompa)
- Anna German
- Ray Charles (For Mama "La Mamma")
- Lisa del Bo
- Domenico Modugno
- Marla Glen (Our World album, 1997)
- Agnaldo Timóteo
- Jean Vallée
- Demis Roussos
- Corry Brokken
- Will Tura
- Chico & The Gypsies (La mama)
- Elvina Makaryan
- Isabelle Boulay (2002)
- Yoyoy Villame (parody in Cebuano titled "Mamay Maliya")
- Heino La mamma (clip)
- Dakis Dakis La Mamma
- Yseult

== See also ==
- La mamma
