= Connie Francis Sings the All-Time International Hits =

Studio album by Connie Francis
- Released: August 1965
- Genres: Pop; Ethnic
- Length: 44:19
- Labels: MGM; SE-4298/E-4298
- Producer: Danny Davis

Connie Francis chronology
Connie Francis Sings "For Mama" (1965)	Connie Francis Sings the All-Time International Hits (1965)	Jealous Heart (1966)

Connie Francis Sings the All-Time International Hits is the twenty-ninth studio album by American singer Connie Francis, and was released in August 1965 by MGM Records. For this multilingual project, Francis continued recording with producer Danny Davis. The album was given a mostly positive critical reception and charted in the United States.

== Background, recording and content ==
In 1965, Connie Francis's pop records were regularly charting but were not selling as many copies as in the earlier years of her career. This led her to record more in languages other than English, where she had more success. On this album, Francis sings in English, Greek, French, Spanish, German, Portuguese, Italian, and Hebrew. Danny Davis produced the album, which consists of 12 tracks, six on either side, and includes old standards like "Stardust" (1927) and "You're Breaking My Heart" (1948), as well as contemporary songs like "And I Love Her" by The Beatles (1964) and "The Girl from Ipanema" by Antônio Carlos Jobim. Connie Francis Sings the All-Time International Hits also includes a medley of two popular Jewish songs, "Exodus" and "Hava Nagila". The songs "La Vie en rose" and "Milord" were made popular by French singer Édith Piaf.

== Critical reception ==
Professional ratings
Review scores
Source	Rating
Encyclopedia of Popular Music	4/5 stars
Billboard	Positive (Spotlight)
Cashbox	Positive (Pop Picks)
Record World	Positive (Pick Hits)

Music critics gave Connie Francis Sings the All-Time International Hits was a positive critical response following its release. Billboard magazine called it "by far one of the most exciting and salable packages in the career of the multi-talented Miss Francis", adding it was "well produced by Danny Davis and destined for the top of the LP charts." Cashbox magazine stated: "The musical settings run from the soft, swaying rhythm of the bossa nova ('Girl from Ipanema'), through the sparkling exuberance of the French 'Milord,' and down to the impassioned 'Exodus,' with each tune receiving its full complement of the lark's emotion-packed style". The reviewer concluded: "This one should bring home lots of coin". Record World magazine said: "word has it that Connie is now studying the little-known dialects of Africa and Australia for her next album", and that "until that time listeners and nations will have to content themselves with Connie chanting like the pro she is ... Gal includes an exciting Israeli medley, 'La Vie en rose,' etc." The Encyclopedia of Popular Music gave the album a four-star rating, meaning it is "outstanding".

== Chart performance ==
Connie Francis Sings the All-Time International Hits was one of Francis' albums to miss the Billboard Top LP's chart in the early 1960s. It entered Cashbox magazine's Looking Ahead Albums chart in the issue dated September 4, 1965, peaking at number 117 during its three weeks on the chart. The album debuted on the Record World LP's Coming Up chart in the issue dated September 11, 1965, peaking at number 106 in late October 1965 during an eleven-week run on the chart.

== Track listing ==
LP (MGM E-4298 – mono, SE-4298 – stereo)

Side 1
No.	Title	Writer(s)	Length
1.	"What Now My Love" ("Et maintenant")	Gilbert Bécaud; Pierre Delanoë; Carl Sigman	3:00
2.	"Misirlou"	Nicholas Roubanis; Fred Wise; Chaim Tauber; Milton Leeds	2:17
3.	"And I Love Her"	John Lennon; Paul McCartney	2:51
4.	"Milord"	Marguerite Monnot; Georges Moustaki	2:19
5.	"Love Me with All Your Heart" ("Cuando calienta el sol")	Rafael Gastón Pérez; Carlos Rigual; Mario Rigual; Sunny Skylar	2:22
6.	"You're Breaking My Heart"	Pat Genaro; Sunny Skylar; Ruggero Leoncavallo	2:30
Total length:			15:19

Side 2
No.	Title	Writer(s)	Length
1.	"Medley": "Exodus" "Havah Negilah"	Ernest Gold; Traditional	5:03
2.	"La Vie en rose"	Édith Piaf; Louiguy	2:11
3.	"Stardust"	Hoagy Carmichael; Mitchell Parish	3:11
4.	"The Girl from Ipanema"	Antônio Carlos Jobim; Vinicius de Moraes; Norman Gimbel	2:44
5.	"Mack the Knife"	Kurt Weill; Bertolt Brecht; Marc Blitzstein	2:42
6.	"The Wedding" ("La novia")	Joaquín Prieto	3:09
Total length:			18:60

== Charts ==
Chart (1965)	Peak position
US Cashbox Looking Ahead Albums	117
US Record World LP's Coming Up	106

== Release history ==
Region	Date	Format	Label	Ref.
United States and Canada	August 1965	Vinyl (LP)	MGM	
Other territories	Late 1965	Vinyl (LP)	MGM	

== Personnel ==
All credits are adapted from the liner notes of Connie Francis Sings the All-Time International Hits.

- Danny Davis – producer
- Henri René – arranger (tracks A1–A6, B2–B6)
- Joe Mazzu – arranger (track B1)
- Johnny Gregory – conductor
- Val Valentin – director of engineering
