= Love Is Me, Love Is You =

1965 song by Connie Francis

- A-side of US vinyl

Single by Connie Francis
- A-side: Roundabout • UK 45-MGM-1282; Love Is Me, Love Is You; • US MGM K 13470; • UK 45-MGM-1305
- B-side: Love Is Me, Love Is You; • UK 45-MGM-1282; I'd Let You Break My Heart All Over Again • US MGM K 13470; • UK 45-MGM-1305
- Released: 3 Sept. 1965 • UK 45-MGM-1282; Feb. 1966 • US MGM K 13470 March 1966 • UK 45-MGM-1305
- Recorded: 26 May 1965
- Genre: Beat music
- Length: 2:23
- Label: MGM
- Songwriters: Tony Hatch, Jackie Trent
- Producer: Tony Hatch

Connie Francis 1965 UK singles chronology
"My Child"	"Roundabout" / "Love Is Me, Love Is You"	"Jealous Heart"

Connie Francis US singles chronology
"Jealous Heart" / "Can I Rely on You" (1965)	"Love Is Me, Love Is You" / "I'd Let You Break My Heart All Over Again" (1966)	"It's a Different World" / "Empty Chapel" (1966)

Connie Francis 1966 UK singles chronology
"The Phoenix Love Theme (Senza Fine)" / "Bossa Nova Hand Dance (Deixa isso prà là)"	"Love Is Me, Love Is You" / "I'd Let You Break My Heart All Over Again"	"Somewhere, My Love" / "Letter from a Soldier (Dear Mama)"

"Love Is Me, Love Is You"

Single by Jackie Trent
- B-side: "This Time"
- Released: March 18, 1966
- Genre: Beat music
- Label: Pye Records 7N 17082
- Songwriters: Tony Hatch, Jackie Trent
- Producer: Tony Hatch

Jackie Trent singles chronology
"You, Baby" / "Send Her Away" (1966)	"Love Is Me, Love Is You" (1966)	"If You Ever Leave Me" / "There Goes My Love, There Goes My Life" (1966)

Love Is Me, Love Is You is a song written by Tony Hatch and Jackie Trent and first recorded by Connie Francis.

== Background ==
Due to Petula Clark having reached #1 on the Billboard Hot 100 in January 1965 with "Downtown" and being afforded a smash follow-up with "I Know a Place", Connie Francis was eager to work with Clark's main composer and producer Tony Hatch. They met on 26 May 1965 at Philips Studios at Stanhope Place in London for a three-song session which yielded a cover version of Connie Smith's 1964 C&W classic "Once a Day", the ballad "Roundabout" (previously recorded by Petula Clark but then unreleased) and the beat number "Love Is Me, Love Is You". The session notes indicate two versions of "Love Is Me, Love Is You", referred to as "US version" and "UK version". Both versions share a very similar orchestral arrangement with only slight differences, but make distinct use of the background vocalists on the song's refrain, the US version featuring the background vocalists singing "doo-wop" behind Francis' vocal while on the UK version the background vocalists sing-along with Francis.

== Overview ==
"Love Is Me, Love Is You" had its original single release serving as B-side to "Roundabout" in that track's UK single release of 3 September 1965. In the US – where "Roundabout" had been released with the B-side "Bossa Nova Hand Dance" – "Love Is Me, Love Is You" was given an A-side single release in February 1966 to rise to a Billboard Hot 100 peak of #66. In the UK Francis' "Love Is Me, Love Is You" was given an A-side release in March 1966, two other versions of the song being issued as UK singles that month, the first by Truly Smith (11 March 1966) with a rendition by co-writer Jackie Trent – produced by Tony Hatch – being released 18 March 1966: none of the three versions would reach the UK Top 50. In Canada, Francis' "Love Is Me, Love Is You" would chart with a #38 peak. In Australia the track would afford Francis her final major hit in that territory with a #31 peak. The Connie Francis single release with "Love Is Me, Love Is You" as A-side featured as B-side the track "I'd Let You Break My Heart All Over Again" which Francis had recorded 10 July 1959.

== Other versions ==
In March 1966 Francis recorded a number of non-English renderings of "Love Is Me, Love Is You":

- German "Er ist mein" – unreleased until 1988
- Italian "Cosa c'è che non va" – B-side of "Dove non so"
- Japanese 恋はみんなのもの ("Koi Wa Minna No Mono")
- Spanish "Amor soy yo, amor eres tú" aka "El sabor del amor"

Despite being largely overlooked in its original English-language version, "Love Is Me, Love Is You" was recorded in non-English renderings by a number of vocalists:

- Dutch "Liefde Smeult, Liefde Groeit, Liefde Bloeit, Liefde Stoeit"/ Milly Scott
- Finnish "Kenen syy, kenen syy"/ Kristina Hautala
- French (Québécois) "L'amour vient, l'amour va"/ Chantal Pary
- French (Québécois) "Moi, je t'aime...toi, tu m'aimes"/ Fernande Dauth
- German "Ein mal eins (1 x 1)" / Wencke Myhre
- German "Einmal eins das ist eins" Gaby Vesper
- Mandarin "Love is Me, Love is You"/ Rita Chao
- Swedish "Rött är rött, svart på vitt"/ Lill-Babs.
