= I Was Such a Fool (to Fall in Love with You) =

Single by Connie Francis

from the album Connie Francis Sings "For Mama"
- B-side: "He Thinks I Still Care"
- Released: September 1962
- Genre: Vocal; pop
- Length: 2:45
- Label: MGM; 13096
- Songwriters: Michael Canosa, Danny Stradella

Connie Francis singles chronology
"Vacation" (1962)	"I Was Such a Fool (to Fall in Love with You)" (1962)	"I'm Gonna Be Warm This Winter" (1962)

"I Was Such a Fool (to Fall in Love with You)" is a song written by Michael Canosa and Danny Stradella, and was released first as a single in late 1959 by The Flamingos. The song was revived three years later by Connie Francis.

== The Flamingos version ==
The Flamingos released the original version of the song as a single in December 1959, with the recording session produced by George Goldner. Their version reached No. 71 on the Billboard Hot 100 chart the next year. It was ranked higher on the Cashbox Top 100 Singles, where it peaked at No. 67.

== Connie Francis version ==
=== Background ===
In early 1962 "Don't Break the Heart That Loves You" had become Francis' third and final single to top the Billboard Hot 100 and the Billboard Easy Listening charts. The single also rose to high positions on international charts as well. After the chart-topper, she would have two more top ten singles and later "I Was Such a Fool (to Fall in Love with You)", a familiar ballad like singles before, was scheduled to release in the fall of 1962. The recording session was arranged and conducted by Bill McElhiney.

=== Release and reception ===
"I Was Such a Fool (to Fall in Love with You)" was released as a seven-inch single in September 1962 by MGM Records. It was backed by a country song, "He Thinks I Still Care" on the B-side, which was lifted from her album Country Music Connie Style released earlier that year. It was produced by Danny Davis. "I Was Such a Fool" would make its album debut three years later on Connie Francis Sings "For Mama".

The single received a positive critical reception upon its release. Cashbox stated that "The lark, who just has a solid sales “Vacation,” heads into the Fall months with a double-decker that's sure to be all over the charts in no time flat. One half, “He Still Thinks I Care,” is a lilting, crying towel ‘answer’ to the recent George Jones country smash. “I Was Such A Fool” is a beat-ballad new comer also from the weeper dept." Billboard believed that it was "two more powerhouse sides from Connie." Saying "Both are in the ballad groove," continuing that "He Still Thinks I Care" is a "moving weeper done with country touches against chorus and ork", and called "I Was Such a Fool" a "tender ballad which the lass emotes over tasteful backing."

=== Chart performance ===
"I Was Such a Fool (to Fall in Love with You)" debuted on Billboard magazine's Easy Listening chart on September 20, 1962, peaking at No. 8 during a seven-week run on the chart. The single didn't reach the top 10 on the Billboard Hot 100, although it reached the top 40, and peaked at No. 24 on the chart. On Cashbox magazine's Top 100 Singles chart the single was ranked higher, peaking at No. 18. The single also reached No. 19 on the Music Vendor 100 Top Pops chart. The single also sold well in Canada, reaching No. 32 on the CHUM charts. "He Thinks I Still Care" reached No. 26 the next week on the same charts.

== Charts ==
=== Connie Francis version ===
Chart (1962)	Peak position
US Billboard Hot 100	24
US Billboard Easy Listening	8
US Cashbox Top 100 Singles	18
US Music Vendor 100 Top Pops	19
Canada CHUM Hit Parade	32

=== The Flamingos version ===
Chart (1960)	Peak position
US Billboard Hot 100	71
US Cashbox Top 100 Singles	67
