= Ho bisogno di vederti =

1965 single by Connie Francis

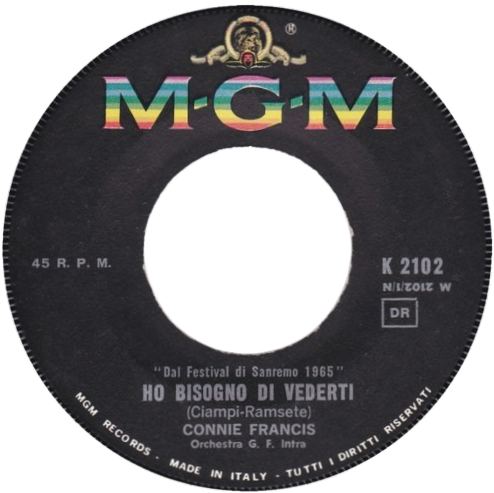

Single by Connie Francis
- B-side: "Whose Heart Are You Breaking Tonight?"
- Released: 1965
- Recorded: 1964
- Length: A-side: 3:30; B-side: 2:25
- Label: MGM Records K 2102
- Songwriters: Ramsete, Roberto Ciampi

Connie Francis Italian singles chronology
"Una notte cosi" (1964)	"Ho bisogno di vederti" (1965)	"C'e una cosa che non sai" (1965)

"Ho bisogno di vederti"

Single by Connie Francis
- B-side: "C'e una cosa che non sai"
- Released: 1965
- Length: A-side: 3:30; B-side: 2:46
- Label: MGM Records K 2109
- Songwriters: Ramsete, Roberto Ciampi

Connie Francis Italian singles chronology
"C'e una cosa che non sai" (1965)	"Ho bisogno di vederti" (1965)	"Misteriosamente" (1963)

"Ho bisogno di vederti"

Single by Gigliola Cinquetti
- B-side: "Grazie amore"
- Released: 1965
- Label: Compagnia Generale del Dischi (CGD) N9532
- Songwriters: Ramsete, Roberto Ciampi

Ho bisogno di vederti was a song written by Ramsete and Roberto Ciampi presented at the Sanremo Music Festival 1965 and released by Connie Francis and Gigliola Cinquetti.

== Background ==
The song "Ho bisogno di vederti" was written for the Sanremo Music Festival and was performed by both Connie Francis and Gigliola Cinquetti using two different orchestral arrangements. The song was first performed in the second semi-final of the event on 29 January 1965 and was performed again during the final.

== Connie Francis ==
=== Initial release: MGM Records single K 2102 ===
The recording of Connie Francis's "Ho bisogno di vederti" was released shortly before the Sanremo Music Festival. As the Sanremo entry got more attention, a British number chosen for the B side was the No. 43 Billboard Hot 100 and No. 7 Billboard Easy Listening Chart "Whose Heart Are You Breaking Tonight?", written by Ted Murry and Benny Davis.

=== Other releases: MGM Records Single K 2109 ===
"Ho bisogno di vederti" was rereleased after the success at the festival. Another Italian song was chosen for side B, "C'è una cosa che non sai". "C'è una cosa che non sai" also appeared on the A side of a single published between both versions of "Ho bisogno di vederti".

=== English version ===
Francis recorded the English version as "You're Mine (Just When You're Lonely)", which was shorter than the Italian version by around 30 seconds.

"You're Mine (Just When You're Lonely)" was released as the B-side of Francis' single "Wishing It Was You".

=== Unregistered German version ===
The German version entitled "Ich muss immer one dich denken" was scheduled to be recorded at Philips Studios in London on May 26, 1965. There, Francis recorded other songs in German with Tony Hatch. However, "During my busy day, I was not registered due to a delay in my busy recording schedule."

== Gigliola Cinquetti recording ==
=== Italian version ===
Gigliola Cinquetti's version of Ho bisogno di vederti was released in Italy on Cinquetti's label Compagnia Generale del Disco.

=== German version ===
Unlike Connie Francis, Gigliola Cinquetti did indeed record Ich muss immer an dich denken, the German version of Ich muss immer an dich denken. It was released in Germany on Italia Records Single # 2031.
