= La mamma =

Studio album by Charles Aznavour
- Released: 1963
- Genre: Chanson
- Length: 49:42
- Label: Barclay
- Producer: Paul Mauriat (orchestration)

Charles Aznavour chronology
Qui ? (1963)	La mamma (1963)	Charles Aznavour, vol. 1 (1964)

Professional ratings
Review scores
Source	Rating
Allmusic	4/5 stars

La mamma is the eleventh French studio album by the French singer Charles Aznavour, released in 1963. It achieved TOP1 in France for several weeks, Spain (also TOP1), it was a TOP10 hit in Belgium, Holland, and other countries. It became a bestseller, and sold over a million copies only in France. The English version of 'La Mamma' entitled 'For Mama', was written in 1964, with words by Don Black and became a hit in Philippines. In the US Ray Charles performed it.

The album includes songs by Charles Aznavour, Georges Garvarentz and others.

It was reissued in 1995 by EMI.

== Track listing ==
1. La mamma (Charles Aznavour / Robert Gall)
2. Si tu m'emportes (Charles Aznavour)
3. Je T'Attends (Charles Aznavour / Gilbert Bécaud)
4. Sylvie (Charles Aznavour)
5. Et Pourtant (Charles Aznavour / Georges Garvarentz)
6. Les Aventuriers (Charles Aznavour / Jacques Plante)
7. Tu veux (Charles Aznavour)
8. Le temps des caresses (Charles Aznavour)

== Track listing of the 1995 CD Reissue ==
1. La mamma (Charles Aznavour / Robert Gall)
2. Si tu m'emportes (Charles Aznavour)
3. Je T'Attends (Charles Aznavour)
4. Sylvie (Charles Aznavour)
5. Et Pourtant (Charles Aznavour / Georges Garvarentz)
6. Les Aventuriers (Charles Aznavour / Jacques Plante)
7. Tu veux (Charles Aznavour)
8. Le temps des caresses (Charles Aznavour)
9. Ne Dis Rien (Charles Aznavour)
10. Poker (Charles Aznavour / Pierre Roche)
11. Sur Ma Vie (Charles Aznavour)
12. Plus Bleu Que Tes Yeux (Charles Aznavour)
13. Merci Mon Dieu (Charles Aznavour)
14. Moi J'Fais Mon Rond (Charles Aznavour / Gaby Wagenheim)
15. J'Aime Paris au mois de mai (Charles Aznavour / Pierre Roche)
16. Ton beau visage (Charles Aznavour)
17. Vivre avec toi (Charles Aznavour)
18. Si je n'avais plus (Charles Aznavour)

== Personnel ==
- Charles Aznavour - Author, Composer, Vocals
- Raoul Breton - Text
- Robert Gall - Composer
- Georges Garvarentz - Composer
- Andre Gornet - Photography
- Herman Leonard - Photography
- Paul Mauriat - Orchestration
- Jacques Plante - Lyricist
- Pierre Roche - Composer
- Lévon Sayan - Artistic Consultation, Photography
- Gaby Wagenheim - Composer

== Links ==
- La mamma (live)
