= I'm Me Again – Silver Anniversary Album =

Studio album by Connie Francis
- Released: February 1981
- Recorded: 1981, 1980, 1979, 1962, 1961, 1959, 1958
- Genre: Pop
- Length: 39 minutes 26 seconds
- Labels: MGM; MG15406
- Producer: Vinnie Castellano
- Compiler: Pat Niglio

Connie Francis chronology
Who's Happy Now? (1978)	I'm Me Again – Silver Anniversary Album (1981)	Where the Hits Are (1989)

Singles from I'm Me Again – Silver Anniversary Album
- 1. "I'm Me Again"

I'm Me Again – Silver Anniversary Album is the 48th studio album of American entertainer Connie Francis, released in 1981. This is the last studio album in the singer's career.

== Background ==
After being deep into her depression as a result of being raped in November 1974, and losing her voice (that she eventually got back), her career was brought to a halt. In 1981 she started performing again to enthusiastic audiences, and recording again. I'm Me Again was Connie Francis' last song to chart on the Adult Contemporary chart, peaking at No. 40, and marked her return to the studio.

After the song she started to work on her next album, I'm Me Again – Silver Anniversary Album, her long-awaited comeback album celebrating 25 years of her career. The album has a mix of old hit songs from the 1950s and 1960s such as "Where the Boys Are" and "My Happiness" and never before released songs like "Lincoln Street Chapel" and "Milk and Honey". The album didn't chart, but it was important to her career, and was her return to the show business after a 7 year absence, although after the album was recorded, her brother was murdered, which made her go deeper into her depression.

Francis chose Vinnie Castellano as the producer of the album, choosing him because "...I liked what Vinnie was doing and I liked him personally."

== Reception ==
Billboard put the album in its Recommeneded LP's section, writing "...Francis' plaintive wail virtually defines the romantic and sexual longing of the late '50s early teens in the '60s era in which she reached her peak popularity." The Encyclopedia of Popular Music gave the album a three-star rating as well.

== Album information ==
- Album art by David Hefernan
- Design by Bob Heimall
- Album compiled by Pat Niglio
- Remixes and engineering by Pat Niglio and Rob Edward
- Photos taken in London
- The album was also released on cassette tape.

== Track listing ==
Side one
No.	Title	Writer(s)	Length
1.	"I'm Me Again"	Alan Roy Scott; Ed Fox	3:30
2.	"Milk and Honey"	Margaret Lewis; Mira Ann Smith	3:20
3.	"Lincoln Street Chapel"	Bobby Russell	3:58
4.	"No Sun Today"	James Last; F. Anisfield; Scott English	2:58
5.	"What Good Are Tears?"	James Last; M. Siegel; Scott English	3:28
6.	"Comme Ci, Comme Ca"	Alan Platte; George Kerr; Simon Crimée; Vincent Castellano	3:24

Side two
No.	Title	Writer(s)	Length
7.	"Where the Boys Are"	Neil Sedaka; Howard Greenfield	3:35
8.	"Don't Break the Heart That Loves You"	Benny Davis; Murray Mencher	3:00
9.	"My Happiness"	Betty Peterson Blasco; Borney Bergantine	3:25
10.	"I Don't Want to Walk Without You"	Jule Styne; Frank Loesser	2:45
11.	"White Cliffs of Dover"	Nat Burton; Walter Kent	2:43
12.	"Cry"	Churchill Kohlman	3:20
Total length:			39:26
