= Jealous Heart =

1944 song by Jenny Lou Carson

Single by Tex Ritter and His Texans
- Language: English
- B-side: "We Live In Two Different Worlds"
- Published: July 18, 1944 by Acuff-Rose Publications, Inc., Nashville
- Released: December 1944
- Recorded: September 20, 1944
- Genre: Country
- Length: 3:10
- Label: Capitol 179
- Songwriter: Jenny Lou Carson

Tex Ritter and His Texans singles chronology
"I'm Wastin' My Tears on You" (1944)	"Jealous Heart" (1944)	"You Two-Timed Me One Time Too Often" (1945)

"Jealous Heart" is a classic C&W song written by American country music singer-songwriter Jenny Lou Carson. In the mid 1940s it spent nearly six months on the Country & Western charts. It was subsequently recorded by several pop singers.

== Early versions ==
The first recording of "Jealous Heart" was made in 1944 by its composer Jenny Lou Carson. That 20 September Tex Ritter recorded the song: his version spent 23 weeks on the C&W chart peaking at No. 2.

The song had its first impact in the pop-music field via a recording by Al Morgan, a Chicago-based vocalist/pianist whose version of "Jealous Heart" released September 1949 was on the hit parade for six months spending ten weeks in the Top 5. This Al Morgan is not to be confused with the bassist of the same name.

Also in 1949 Ivory Joe Hunter had an R&B hit with "Jealous Heart"; Hunter's version reached No. 2 R&B that December.

"Jealous Heart" - which Ernest Tubb had recorded in 1945 - was also recorded in 1949 by C&W singers Bill Owens and Kenny Roberts while Pop versions were cut by Bill Lawrence, Jan Garber & His Orchestra (vocal by Bob Grabeau) and Hugo Winterhalter & His Orchestra (vocal by Johnny Thompson).

British duo the Tanner Sisters - Frances and Stella - recorded "Jealous Heart" in London 14 October 1949; this version - which retained the lyrics as recorded by Tex Ritter and Al Morgan rather than gender-adjusting them - was released by EMI as His Master's Voice#9846 with "Hop-Scotch Polka" as the flip. This duo should not be confused with the American female trio of the same name.

Lale Andersen enjoyed a European comeback in 1951 with a German-language version of "Jealous Heart" entitled "Blaue Nacht am Hafen": Andersen wrote the German lyrics herself under the name Nicola Wilke.

== Early revivals ==
In the fall of 1958 three recordings of "Jealous Heart" were released with the version by Tab Hunter reaching No. 62 on the Billboard Hot 100, besting the Fontane Sisters' version (#94) and also the version by Les Paul and Mary Ford which did not chart.

"Jealous Heart" was also a single for Bobby Edwards in 1959.

In the UK the Vernons Girls and Ottilie Patterson had non-charting single versions of "Jealous Heart" in respectively 1959 and 1963 before the version by Irish act the Cadets with Eileen Reid reached No. 42 on the UK Top 50 dated 3 June 1965.

After debuting on the Cash Box Top 100 Singles chart dated 1 November 1958, Tab Hunter's "Jealous Heart" was ranked in tandem with the Fontane Sisters' version on the chart dated 8 November and with the Fontane Sisters and Les Paul & Mary Ford versions on the charts dated 15 November and 22 November: on 22 November the joint position assigned the three versions was No. 71. On its subsequent charts Cash Box only listed the Tab Hunter version which peaked at No. 60.

== Connie Francis version ==
"Jealous Heart"

Single by Connie Francis

from the album Jealous Heart
- B-side: "Can I Rely on You"
- Released: 1965
- Recorded: 1965
- Genre: Rock and roll
- Length: 2:34
- Label: MGM Records
- Songwriter: Jenny Lou Carson
- Producer: Jesse Kaye

Connie Francis US singles chronology
"Roundabout" (1965)	"Jealous Heart" (1965)	"Love Is Me, Love Is You" (1966)

Connie Francis recorded "Jealous Heart" 12 August 1965 in Hollywood CA in a session produced by Jesse Kaye with Ernie Freeman conducting.

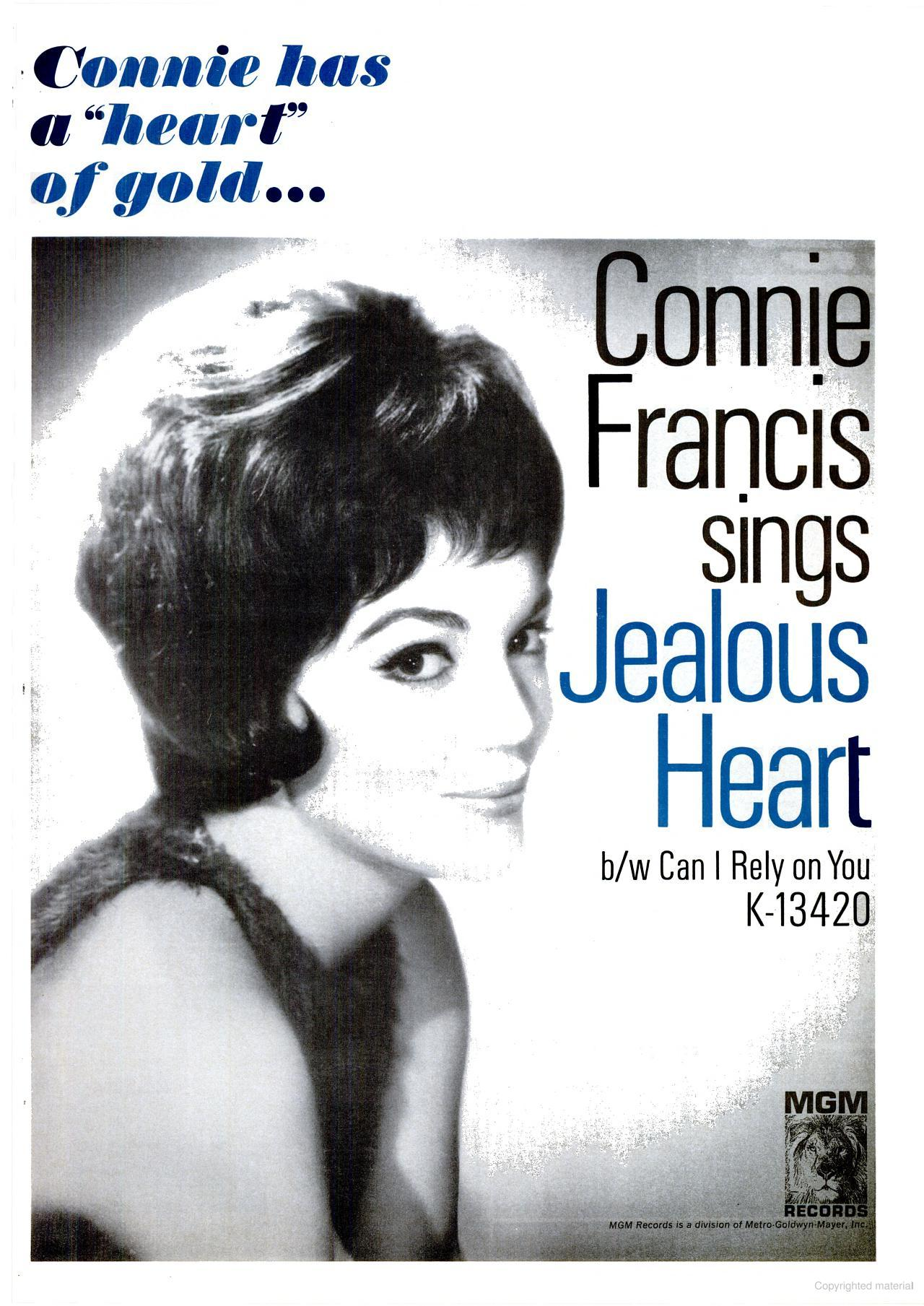
MGM advert for the single in late 1965.

Although Francis had had early hits with remakes of traditional pop songs by the mid-60s she was attempting (with sparse success) to update her sound – the precedent and subsequent releases to her "Jealous Heart" were recorded with Petula Clark's producer Tony Hatch - and "Jealous Heart" was an emphatic throwback to her original hit sound.

The track also served as title cut for an album which was largely a nostalgia concept album heavily featuring standards: "Everything I Have Is Yours," "If You Ever Change Your Mind," "My Foolish Heart" and "Nevertheless" as well as the 1956 hit ballad "Ivory Tower."

Released that November, Francis' "Jealous Heart" peaked at No. 47 in January 1966: it was ranked substantially higher in both Cash Box and Record World at respectively No. 29 and No. 25. In all three trades Francis never had another single reach the Top 60. Her version of "Jealous Heart" was also her last Easy Listening Top 10 hit at No. 10.

"Jealous Heart" was the last Connie Francis single to rank on the UK charts reaching No. 44 in January 1966. Also in early 1966 Francis' "Jealous Heart" reached No. 16 in Canada, and No. 54 in Australia.

== Spanish version ==
"Jealous Heart" has become a standard of Latin music via a Spanish language rendering by Mexican lyricist Mario Molina Montes entitled "Celoso" ("jealous"). Recorded in Nashville in March 1966 by Trio Los Panchos led by Johnny Albino, "Celoso" entered the Top Ten in Mexico in April 1967 and - ranked in tandem with a cover by Marco Antonio Muñiz - the track reached No. 1 that summer spending five months in the Top Ten. In addition the Trio Los Panchos version reached No. 2 - in a tandem ranking with covers by José Feliciano and Oleo Guillot - in Argentina that autumn when the Muñiz version reached No. 1 in Puerto Rico. "Celoso" has also been recorded by Galy Galeano, Ezequiel Peña, José Luis Rodríguez and Sergio Vega.

Johnny Rodriguez recorded a version of "Jealous Heart" in 1972 on the Mercury label.

Los Freddy's recorded "Celoso" on their album Freddy's in 1980.

In 1981 it was recorded another version by Jhensen (Felix Caraballo Leonidas), in his album Cuando te Sientas Sola under Peer Music.

Maná recorded "Celoso" for the soundtrack of the 1995 Gregory Nava movie My Family (Mi Familia).

== Other versions ==
In 1988 Big Tom reached No. 9 on the Irish charts with "Jealous Heart" - actually a four track EP which included the title song.

Other versions of the song include those by Bing Crosby (for his 1965 album Bing Crosby Sings the Great Country Hits), Roy Acuff, Eddy Arnold, Teresa Brewer, Ann Breen, Carl Butler, Eddy Duchin, Margot Eskens (as "Blaue Nacht am Hafen"), Tennessee Ernie Ford, Bill Haley, Wanda Jackson, Sven Arefeldt (as "Hjärtats röst"), Jussi & Kantri Boys (as "Sydämein, Niin Mustasukkainen"), Jerry Lee Lewis, Hank Locklin, Lolita (as "Blaue Nacht am Hafen"), Bob Luman, Loretta Lynn, Al Martino, Jaye P. Morgan, Marie Osmond, Bonnie Owens, Patti Page, Ray Price, Johnnie Ray, Johnny Rodriguez, Jean Shepard, Hank Snow, Kay Starr, Marsha Thornton, Patrick Wall, Kitty Wells, Mark Wynter and Mary Duff.
