= It's a Different World (Connie Francis song) =

Single by Connie Francis

from the EP Love Is Me
- B-side: "Empty Chapel"
- Released: May 1966
- Recorded: March 15, 1966
- Studio: RCA Victor Studio, Webster Hall
- Genre: A-Side — Pop, Rock n roll B-Side — Country
- Length: 2:18
- Label: MGM; K13505
- Songwriter: Jimmie Crane
- Producer: Tom Wilson

Connie Francis singles chronology
"Love Is Me, Love Is You" (1966)	"It's a Different World" (1966)	"A Letter from a Soldier (Dear Mama)" (1966)

Alternative cover
- German single release cover, MGM Records

"It's a Different World" is a song written and composed by Jimmy Crane and most notably performed by Connie Francis, who released it as a single in the middle of 1966 under MGM Records.

== Connie Francis version ==
=== Release and reception ===
"It's a Different World" was released as a seven-inch single in May 1966 by MGM Records in the United States and other territories, although in Germany the release was postponed to July, due to MGM already scheduling another single release in May there. It was backed by a country-styled weeper song, "Empty Chapel" on the B-side, which was later included in her To Each His Own compilation album, released in 1993, mainly in South Africa. Both tracks were arranged and conducted by Benny Golson and produced by Tom Wilson. The single was advertised as a "bright" single with a "new direction".

The single received a positive critical reception upon its release. Record World gave the single four stars and in its short review of it stated that "Connie has gone into the echo chamber for this big ork rocker," and called it "A click". Cashbox reviewed the single in early May and said that "Connie Francis can have one of her biggest smashes in quite a while with this top-notch MGM original dubbed 'It’s A Different World.'" The magazine added "The tune is a rhythmic, pulsating romantic handclapper about a lucky gal who's on cloud nine now that she's found Mr. Right."

=== Chart performance ===
"It's a Different World" debuted at No. 34 on May 28, 1966 on the Billboard Bubbling Under the Hot 100, dropping out the next week. The single reached No. 42 on the Cashbox Looking Ahead, and peaked at No. 43 on the Record World Looking Ahead singles chart. Outside of America the single didn't sell well, unlike "Love is Me, Love is You" the single didn't chart in Canada and Australia.

=== Track listing ===
7" vinyl single

- "It's a Different World" - 2:18
- "Empty Chapel" – 3:14

== Charts ==
Chart performance for "It's a Different World"
Chart (1966)	Peak position
US Billboard Bubbling Under Hot 100	134
US Cashbox Looking Ahead	142
US Record World Up-Coming Singles	143
