= Jealous Heart (Connie Francis album) =

Studio album by Connie Francis
- Released: 1966
- Label: MGM

Connie Francis chronology
Connie Francis Sings the All-Time International Hits (1965)	Jealous Heart (1966)	Movie Greats of the 60s (1966)

Jealous Heart is an album by American singer Connie Francis, released in 1966 by MGM Records.

== Reception ==
Professional ratings
Review scores
Source	Rating
Billboard	favorable ("Spotlight" pick)

Billboard picked the album for its "Spotlight" section as one with "sufficient sales potential". The magazine's reviewer noted that the LP was created around Francis' recent hit "Jealous Heart" and featured "12 country-oriented performances", including covers of such hits as "Ivory Tower" and "My Foolish Heart".

== Track listing ==
LP (MGM E-4355 – mono, SE-4355 – stereo)

Side 1
No.	Title	Length
1.	"Jealous Heart" (Carson)	2:33
2.	"If You Ever Get Lonely" (Forshee)	2:38
3.	"Everything I Have Is Yours" (Lane–Adamson)	2:31
4.	"If You Ever Change Your Mind" (Randazzo–Louis–Weinstein–Barberis)	2:19
5.	"Do I"	2:26
6.	"Fair Weather Lover" (Steward–Wooten)	2:26

Side 2
No.	Title	Length
1.	"Ivory Tower" (Fulton–Steele)	2:14
2.	"Once a Day" (Anderson)	3:04
3.	"My Foolish Heart" (Young–Washington)	2:50
4.	"I'm Falling in Love with You Tonight" (Davis–Murry)	2:57
5.	"Nevertheless (I'm in Love with You)" (Kalmar–Ruby)	2:12
6.	"So Long, Goodbye" (Zais)	2:43
