= I'm Me Again =

Single by Connie Francis

from the album I'm Me Again – Silver Anniversary Album
- A-side: "I'm Me Again"
- B-side: "Comme ci, comme ça"
- Released: 1981
- Recorded: 1980
- Genre: Pop
- Length: A-side - 3:30; B-side – 3:24
- Label: MGM
- Lyricists: A-side - Ed Fox & Alan Roy Scott; B-side – Alan Platte, George Kerr, Simon Crimée, Vincent Castellano
- Producer: Vinnie Castellano

Connie Francis singles chronology
| "My Mother's Eyes" (1978) | "I'm Me Again" (1981) | "There's Still a Few Good Love Songs Left in Me" (1983) |

"I'm Me Again" is a song recorded by American entertainer Connie Francis and released as a single in January of 1981, and later included in her album I'm Me Again - Silver Anniversary Album. It was written by Alan Roy Scott and Ed Fox.

== Background ==
Connie Francis returned to the studio in 1980 to cut "Comme ci, comme ça" and "I'm Me Again", the latter of which became the title track of an album which featured the new songs. This also meant that she would come back to her first label, MGM, which she had left ten years ago. Francis was well-beyond her hitmaking days, but "I'm Me Again" showed she was ready to resume her career.

Francis appeared on the American Bandstand program on December 20, 1980, performing the song. When asked, she confirmed that she would return to recording again, but would appear live less. She also added that she wasn't recording or doing much by 1980, but one day she went to meet her manager (George Schneck), when Ed Fox and Alan Roy Scott, (nineteen year old songwriters) had prepared a song for her. She was surprised that the song's lyrics so perceptive and that they knew exactly what she wanted to sing. She noted that the song she was given "...changed everything"

Francis chose Vinnie Castellano to produce the single, as well as the silver anniversary album, choosing him because "...I liked what Vinnie was doing and I liked him personally".

== Promotion ==
Francis personally promoted the single by appearing on the aforementioned American Bandstand and also an in-store visit in December at Harmony Hut in Willowbrook, New Jersey, her home state. By February, she was in the midst of several appearances on television talk shows to perform the song.

== Chart performance ==
"I'm Me Again" debuted on Billboard magazine's Adult Contemporary chart in the issue dated January 31, 1981, peaking at No. 40 during a six-week run on it. The song became her last to appear on the chart.

== Charts ==
| Chart (1981) | Peak position |
|---|---|
| US Billboard AC | 40 |
