= Roundabout (Connie Francis song) =

- Japanese release cover

Single by Connie Francis
- B-side: "Bossa Nova Hand Dance (Deixa isso prà là)"
- Released: August 2, 1965
- Genre: Vocal
- Length: 2:51
- Label: MGM; 13389
- Songwriter: Tony Hatch
- Producer: Tony Hatch

Connie Francis singles chronology
"Forget Domani" (1965)	"Roundabout" (1965)	"Jealous Heart" (1965)

"Roundabout" is a song written by Tony Hatch and most notably performed by Connie Francis, who released it as a single under MGM Records in 1965.

== Connie Francis version ==
=== Background ===
By 1965 Francis' chart performance decline on the pop charts, but she maintained relatively high successes on the Adult Contemporary chart. The new single followed a period of declining chart performance for Francis, so she partnered up with songwriter Tony Hatch, who just written Petula Clark's No. 1 hit Downtown a year before. "Roundabout" was the second-to-last of six singles that she released that year. It was produced and arranged by Tony Hatch himself, but arranged by Don Costa on the B-side.

=== Release and reception ===
"Roundabout" was released as a seven-inch single on August 2, 1965 by MGM Records. It was backed by a bossa-nova song, "Bossa Nova Hand Dance (Deixa isso prà là)" on the B-side, which saw its first album inclusion in Francis' 2009 Cocktail Connie compilation album. It was produced by Danny Davis.

The single received a positive critical reception. Record World said that "Gal has found a honey of a song for herself. It's by Tony Hatch and is slow and melodic." The magazine also called it "One of her best." Billboard magazine reviewed the single in mid August and stated that "Merging the true Francis talent with that of England's composer-arranger Tony Hatch of "Downtown" fame pays off in this well performed ballad with rhythm backing."

=== Chart performance ===
"Roundabout" debuted on Billboard magazine's Easy Listening chart on August 28, 1965, peaking at No. 10 during a nine-week run on the chart. The single broke in to the Billboard Hot 100, peaking at No. 80. On Cashbox magazine's Top 100 Singles chart the single reached No. 83. The single also reached a lower No. 92 on the Record World 100 Top Pops chart.

=== Track listing ===
7" vinyl single

- "Roundabout" – 2:51
- "Bossa Nova Hand Dance (Deixa isso prà là)" – 2:06

== Charts ==
Chart performance for "Roundabout"
Chart (1965)	Peak position
US Billboard Hot 100	80
US Billboard Easy Listening	10
US Cashbox Top 100 Singles	83
US Record World 100 Top Pops	92

== Other versions ==
- Connie Francis also recorded a Japanese version of the song in 1966, released in Japan with the English version as the B-side. She also made a Spanish version, "Mistereosamente", which she released in Spain with the B-side "Milord".
- The song was previously recorded by Petula Clark, but wasn't released.
