= Somewhere, My Love (album) =

- Cover of UK single edition of the song "Somewhere, My Love"

Studio album by Connie Francis
- Released: June 1966
- Recorded: May – June 1966
- Genre: Pop
- Label: MGM, distributed by Polydor, 60 709
- Producer: Gerhard Mendelsohn, Pete Spargo, Alan Lorber, Tom Wilson

Connie Francis chronology
Melodien, die die Welt erobern (1966)	Somewhere, My Love (1966)	Lass mich bei dir sein (1967)

Somewhere, My Love is a studio album recorded by American singer Connie Francis.

== Background ==
Produced as a special release for the German Bertelsmann Record Club, Somewhere, My Love is a compilation of English-language and German-language tracks recorded by Francis in May and June 1966.

The English recordings "Somewhere, My Love (Lara's Theme)", "Dance My Trouble Away" and "The Shadow of Your Smile" were taken from Francis's 1966 US album Movie Greats of the 60s while "Spanish Nights and You" was included as it had been one of Francis's most successful international single releases of 1966.

The German recordings "Malagueña", "Deine Liebe (True Love)", "Heißer Sand" and "Sag, weißt du denn, was Liebe ist (Love Is a Many Splendored Thing)" had been included previously on the German album Melodien, die die welt erobern, Francis's first German-language concept album which had been released to tie in with her first German TV special of the same name.

The song "Es ist so schön, dass es dich gibt" was included as it was Francis's current single in Germany in June 1967 when the album was released.

== Track listing ==
=== Side A ===
#	Title	Songwriter	Length
1.	"Somewhere, My Love (Lara's Theme)"	Maurice Jarre, Paul Francis Webster	3.01
2.	"Dance My Trouble Away"	Mikis Theodorakis, A. Stillmann	3.29
3.	"The Shadow of Your Smile"	Johnny Mandel, Paul Francis Webster	2.59
4.	"Für immer (Moon River)"	Henry Mancini, Johnny Mercer, Joachim Relin	2.44
5.	"Spanish Nights and You"	Ray Allen, Wandra Merrell	2.26

=== Side B ===
#	Title	Songwriter	Length
1.	"Malagueña" (German version)	Ernesto Lecuona, Ernst Verch	3.11
2.	"Deine Liebe (True Love)"	Cole Porter, Glando	3.12
3.	"Heißer Sand"	Werner Scharfenberger, Kurt Feltz	3.02
4.	"Sag, weißt du denn, was Liebe ist (Love Is a Many Splendored Thing)"	Sammy Fain, Paul Francis Webster, Ernst Verch	2.49
5.	"Es ist so schön, dass es dich gibt"	Werner Scharfenberger, Fini Busch	2.27
