= Connie Francis =

American singer and actress (1937–2025)

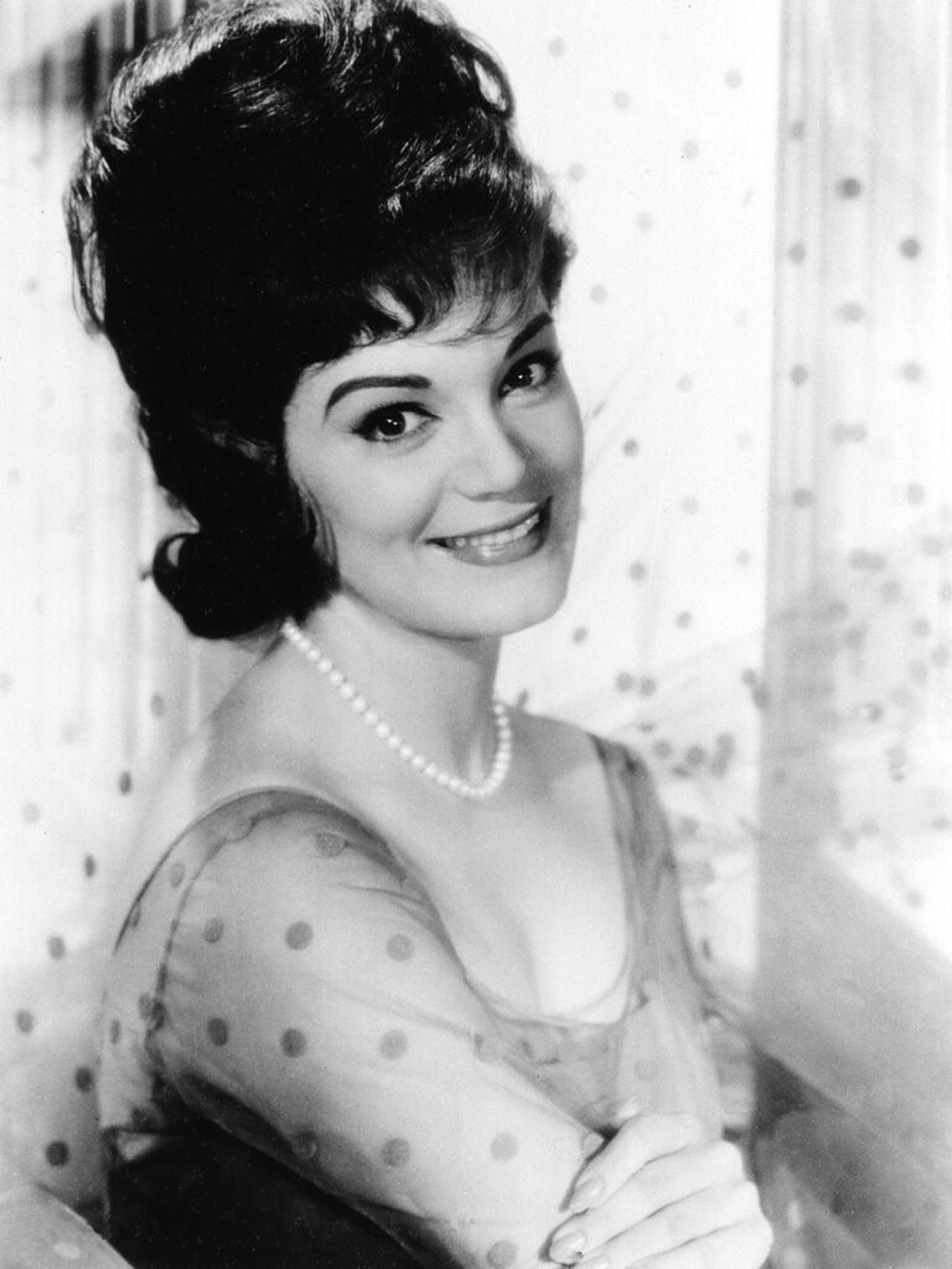
- Francis in 1964
- Born: Concetta Rosa Maria Franconero; December 12, 1937; Newark, New Jersey, U.S.
- Died: July 16, 2025 (aged 87); Pompano Beach, Florida, U.S.
- Occupations: Singer; musician; actress; author
- Years active: 1957–2018
- Spouses: Dick Kanellis (m. 1964; div. 1964); Izzy Marion (m. 1971; div. 1971); Joe Garzilli (m. 1973; div. 1977); Bob Parkinson (m. 1985; div. 1985)
- Musical career
- Genres: Traditional pop; rock and roll; country pop; vocal jazz
- Instruments: Vocals; accordion
- Labels: MGM; Polydor; GSF; Ivanhoe; United Artists; Malaco; Herzklang; Legacy Recordings; Carlton Music; Concetta
- Website: www.conniefrancis.com

Concetta Rosa Maria Franconero (/ˌfræŋkoʊˈnɪəroʊ/ FRANG-koh-NEER-oh; December 12, 1937 – July 16, 2025), known professionally as Connie Francis, was an American singer and actress. One of the top-charting female vocalists of the late 1950s and early 1960s, she amassed over 200 million records sold, placing her among the best-selling music artists in history.

After a string of unsuccessful releases, Francis rose to fame in 1957 with her cover of the 1923 song "Who's Sorry Now?", which was followed by various other top-10 hits. She became the first woman to reach No. 1 on the U.S. Billboard Hot 100 chart when "Everybody's Somebody's Fool" topped the chart in 1960. She was also the first woman to achieve three No. 1 hits on the chart, among her 53 career entries. Before the advent of the British Invasion, Francis was the most popular female vocalist in the United States between 1958 and 1964.

Francis recorded music in multiple languages, including English, Spanish, Italian, French, German, Greek, Yiddish, Dutch, Swedish and Japanese, making her a best-selling artist in international markets as well as in American immigrant communities. She recorded songs from various genres, including traditional pop standards, Brill Building pop, rock and roll, country and jazz.

Between 1974 and 1988, a series of traumatic personal experiences, including a rape attack at knifepoint, led Francis to suffer years of psychological and physical difficulties that sidelined her career. She resumed performing from 1989 until her retirement in 2018. She regained prominence in 2025, shortly before her death, when her 1961 recording "Pretty Little Baby" went viral on social media platforms.

== Biography ==
=== 1937–1955: Early life and first appearances ===
Francis was born Concetta Rosa Maria Franconero on December 12, 1937, (Note: Although several sources, as well as Francis herself, previously stated that she was born in 1938, she later clarified in her second autobiography that her actual birth date was December 12, 1937, explaining that she had claimed to have been born in 1938 in order to appear one year younger.) to an Italian-American family (one of her grandfathers having emigrated from Reggio Calabria in 1905) in the Ironbound neighborhood of Newark, New Jersey, the first child of George Franconero (1911–1996) and Ida (née Ferrari-di Vito; 1911–2000). She spent her first years in the Crown Heights, Brooklyn area (Utica Avenue/St Mark's Place), before the family moved to New Jersey. Growing up in a mixed Italian-Jewish neighborhood, Francis became fluent in Yiddish, which led her later to record songs in Yiddish and Hebrew. She had a younger brother, George Franconero Jr.

In her autobiography Who's Sorry Now? published in 1984, Francis recalls that her father encouraged her to appear regularly at talent contests, pageants, and other neighborhood festivities as a child singing and playing the accordion.

During rehearsals for her appearance on Arthur Godfrey's Talent Scouts in December 1950, Francis was advised by Godfrey to change her stage name to Connie Francis for easier pronunciation. Godfrey also told her to drop the accordion—advice she gladly followed, as she had begun to hate the large and heavy instrument. Around the same time, Francis took a job as a singer on demonstration records, to bring unreleased songs to the attention of established singers and/or their management who might choose to record them for a professional commercial record.

Francis attended Newark Arts High School in 1951 and 1952 before she and her family moved to Belleville, New Jersey. Francis graduated as salutatorian from Belleville High School in 1955.

Francis continued to perform at neighborhood festivities and talent shows (some of them broadcast on television), appearing alternately as Concetta Franconero and Connie Franconero. Under the latter name, she appeared on NBC's variety show Startime Kids between 1953 and 1955.

=== 1955–1957: Recording contract and commercial failure ===
In 1955, Startime Kids went off the air. In May that year, George Franconero Sr. and Francis's manager George Scheck raised money for a recording session of four songs which they hoped to sell to a major record company under Francis's own name. Even when MGM Records decided to sign a contract with her, it was because one track she had recorded, "Freddy", happened to be the name of the son of a company executive, Harry A. Meyerson, who thought of the song as a nice birthday gift. Hence, "Freddy" was released as Francis's first single, which turned out to be a commercial failure, just like her next eight solo singles.

Despite these failures, Francis was hired to record the vocals for Tuesday Weld's "singing" scenes in the 1956 movie Rock, Rock, Rock!, and for Freda Holloway in the 1957 Warner Bros. rock and roll movie Jamboree.

In the fall of 1957, Francis enjoyed her first modest success with a duet single she had recorded with Marvin Rainwater: "The Majesty of Love", with "You, My Darlin' You" as the B-side, peaked at number 93 on the Billboard Hot 100. Eventually, the single sold over one million copies.

=== 1957–1959: Breakthrough ===
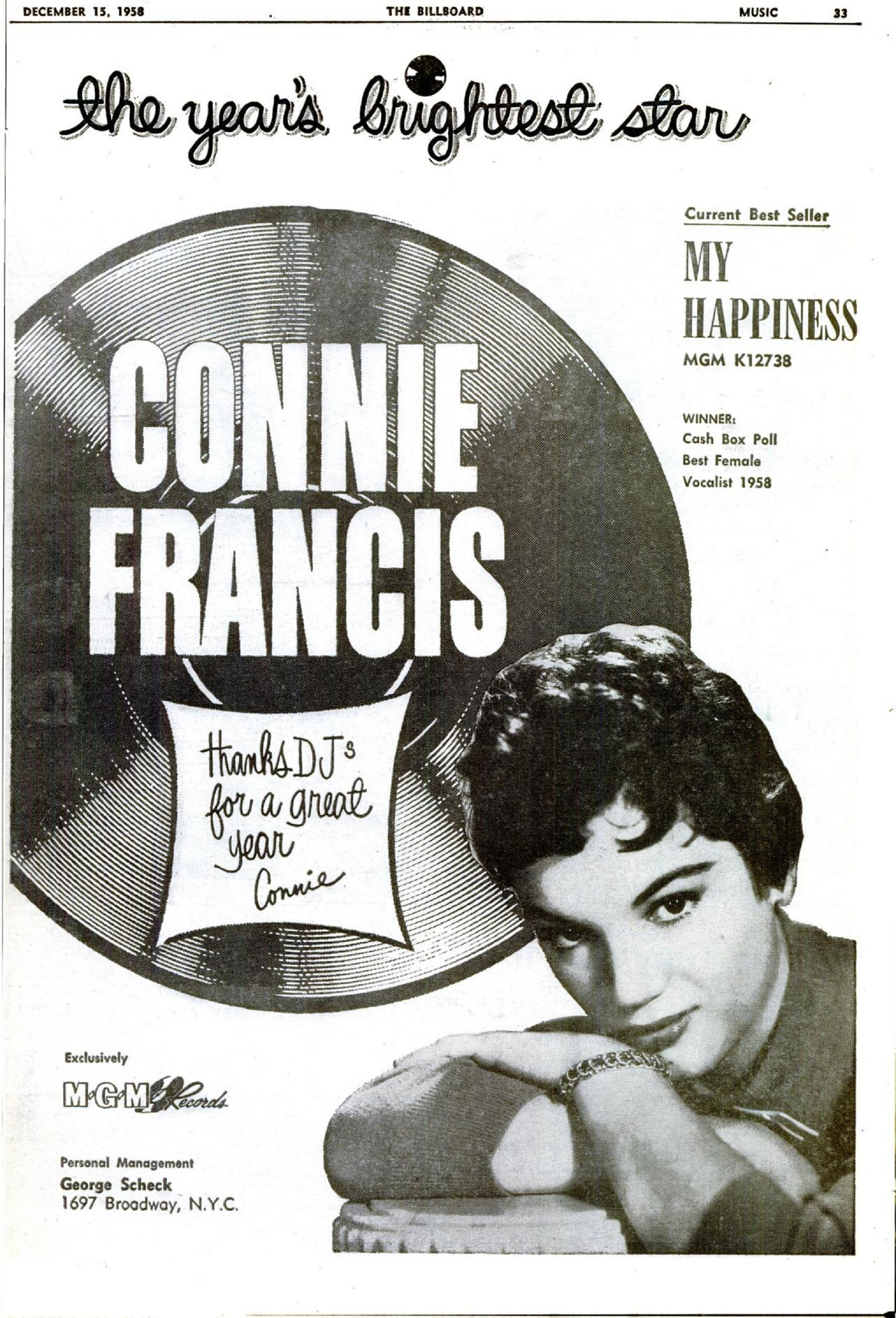
Billboard notice, December 15, 1958

However, her minor chart success came too late for her record label—Francis's recording contract consisted of ten solo singles and one duet single. Though success had finally seemed to come with "The Majesty of Love", Francis was informed by MGM Records that her contract would not be renewed after her last solo single.

Francis considered a career in medicine and was about to accept a four-year scholarship at New York University, thinking her recording career would be over. At a recording session for MGM on October 2, 1957, with Joe Lipman and his orchestra, she recorded a cover version of the 1923 song "Who's Sorry Now?", written by Bert Kalmar and Harry Ruby. Francis stated that she recorded it at the insistence of her father, who was convinced that it would have crossover appeal with both older listeners and teenagers if the song were given a modernized sound: a rock 'n' roll arrangement. Francis strongly objected to the idea because selling the youth audience on an almost 35-year-old song was "ridiculous", but she finally agreed to it as a favor to her father. Francis did not like the song and argued about it with her father heatedly, delaying the recording of the other two songs during the session so much that she thought no time was left on the continuously running recording tape. Her father insisted, though, and when the recording "Who's Sorry Now?" was finished, only a few seconds remained on the tape.

The single seemed to go unnoticed, like all previous releases, just as Francis had predicted, but on January 1, 1958, it debuted on Dick Clark's American Bandstand. Francis watched the show and later said:

I heard Dick Clark mention something about a new girl singer. So, what else is new? Another girl singer. There are ninety-five million females in the country, and I'll bet ninety-five percent of them sing. "There is no doubt about it", predicted Mr. Clark. "She's headed straight for the number one spot". I began feeling sorry for myself and a bit envious, too. Good luck to her, I thought. And then Mr. Clark just happened to play a song called "Who's Sorry Now?" My "Who's Sorry Now?" Well, the feeling was cosmic, just cosmic!

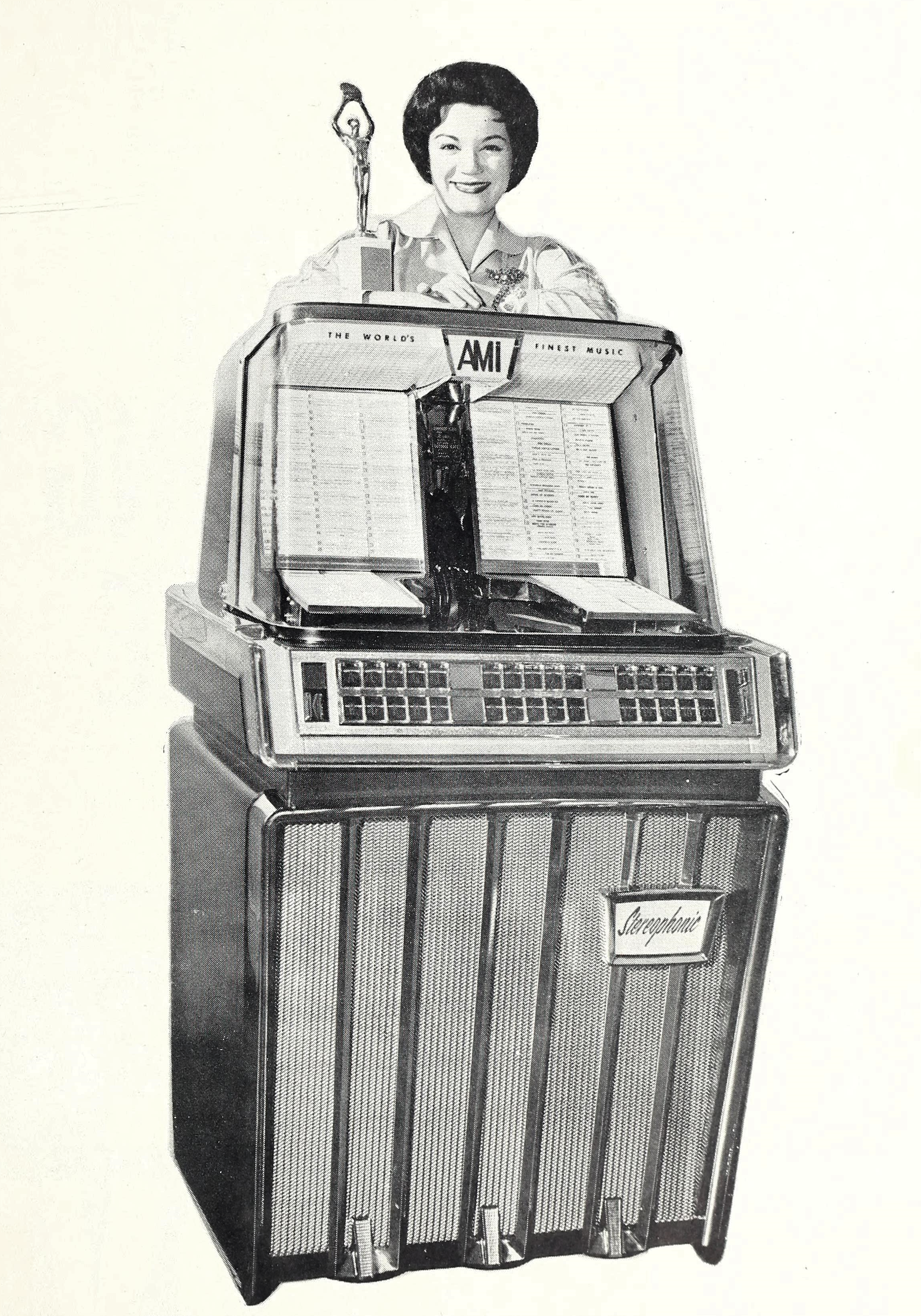
Francis on the January 31, 1959, cover of Cashbox magazine

On February 15, Francis performed it on the first episode of The Saturday Night Beechnut Show, also hosted by Clark. By mid-year, over one million copies had been sold and Francis was suddenly thrust into international stardom. In April 1958, "Who's Sorry Now?" reached number 1 in the UK Singles Chart and number 4 in the United States. That year, by a wide margin, Connie was voted "Best Female Vocalist" by American Bandstand viewers. She went on to collect similar Bandstand awards for the following four years.

She began searching for a new hit record immediately after the success of "Who's Sorry Now?" since MGM Records had renewed her contract. After the relative failure of the follow-up singles done in a similar style, "I'm Sorry I Made You Cry" (which stalled at No. 36), and "Heartaches", which failed to chart at all, Francis met Neil Sedaka and Howard Greenfield, who sang several ballads they had written for her. After a few hours, Francis started writing in her diary as the songwriters played their final ballads. This, and her refusal to let Sedaka and Greenfield see the diary to mine it for material, inspired the duo to write Sedaka's own breakthrough hit "The Diary". Afterwards Francis told them that she considered their ballads too intellectual and sophisticated for the young generation and requested a more lively song. Greenfield urged Sedaka to perform a song they had written that morning with the Shepherd Sisters in mind. Sedaka objected, fearing that Francis would be insulted, but Greenfield argued that anything worse couldn't happen, given that she had disliked all the other songs they had performed. Sedaka then played "Stupid Cupid". After hearing it, Francis declared that he had just played her new hit song. It went on to reach number 14 on the Billboard chart and was her second number 1 in the UK.

The success of "Stupid Cupid" restored momentum to Francis's chart career, and she reached the U.S. top 40 an additional eight times during the remainder of the 1950s. She managed to churn out more hits by covering several older songs, such as "My Happiness" (number 2 on the Hot 100) and "Among My Souvenirs" (number 7), as well as performing her own original songs. In 1959, she gained two gold records for a double-sided hit: on the A-side, "Lipstick on Your Collar" (number 5), and on the B-side, "Frankie" (number 9).

=== 1959–1973: International recording star ===
Following another idea from her father, Francis traveled to London in August 1959 to record an Italian album at EMI's famous Abbey Road Studios. Titled Connie Francis Sings Italian Favorites, the album was released in November 1959. It soon entered the album charts where it remained for 81 weeks, peaking at number 4 and becoming Francis's most successful album. "Mama", the single taken from the album, reached number 8 in the United States and number 2 in the United Kingdom. Following this success, Francis recorded seven more albums of "favorites" between 1960 and 1964, including Jewish, German, and Irish, among others. Francis's 1960 album of Jewish music included songs in Yiddish and Hebrew, such as "Tzena, Tzena, Tzena", "Oifen Pripetchik" and "Hava Nagila". Some Jews, particularly immigrants, saw her album as validating the acceptance of the Jewish community in American society.

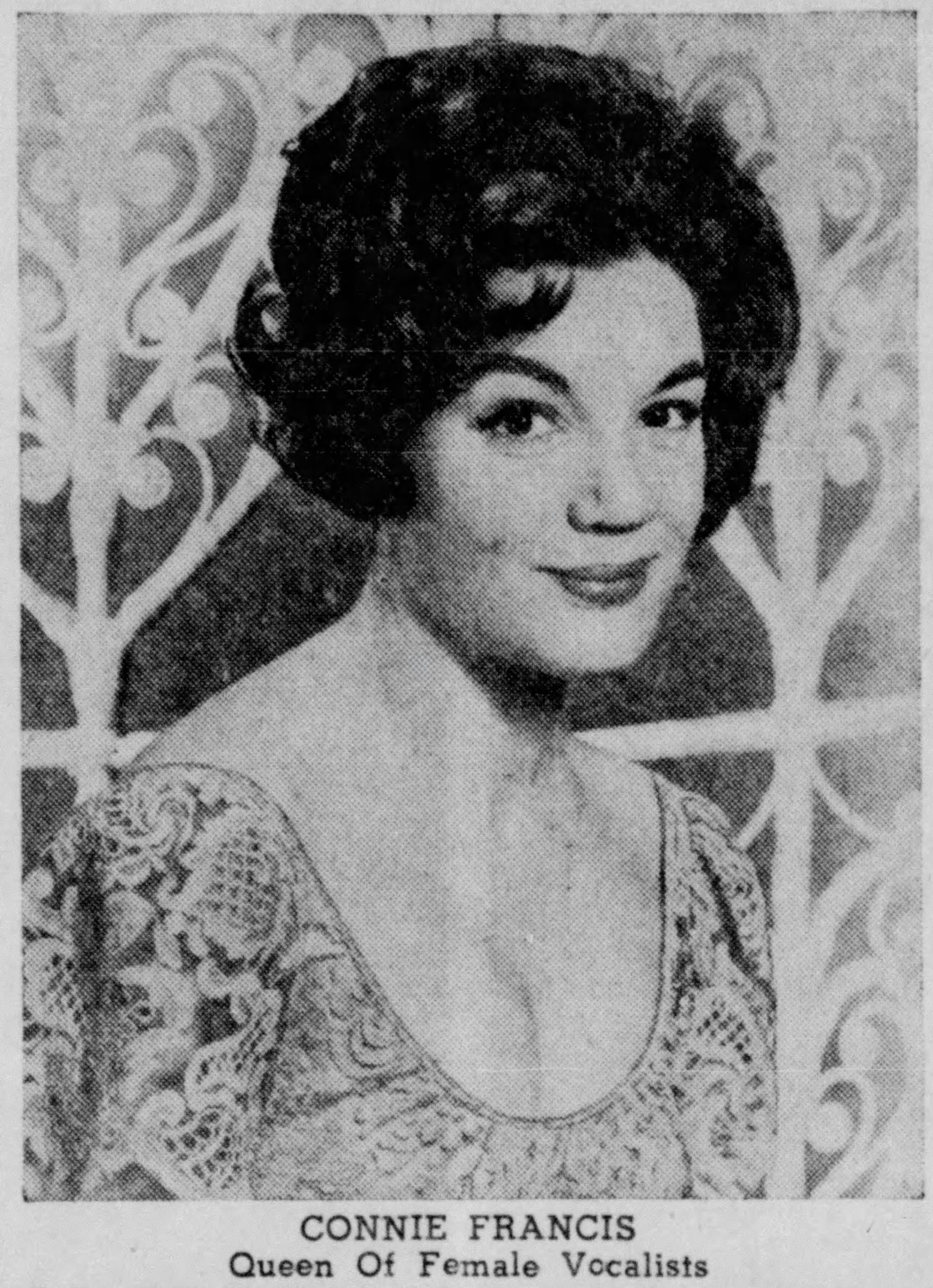
Newspaper clipping, January 12, 1961

Nevertheless, Francis continued to record singles aimed at the youth market. Among her top-ten hits on the Hot 100 were "Breakin' in a Brand New Broken Heart" (1961, number 7), "When the Girl in Your Arms is the Girl in Your Heart" (1961, number 10), "Second Hand Love" (1962, number 7), and "Where the Boys Are" (1961, number 4). The last one became her signature tune and became the theme song of Francis's first motion picture Where the Boys Are. The movie introduced the concept of spring break, and popularized the small town of Fort Lauderdale for college students on their spring vacation in the wake of the movie's success. The film is also noted for being a precursor to and influence on the later beach party genre. She appeared in a number of other movies for MGM including Follow the Boys, Looking for Love, and When the Boys Meet the Girls. All three films had moderately successful soundtrack albums.

The success of "Connie Francis Sings Italian Favorites" in late 1959 and early 1960 led Francis to become one of the first American artists to record regularly in other languages. She was followed by other major British and American recording stars including Wanda Jackson, Cliff Richard, Petula Clark, Brenda Lee, the Supremes, Peggy March, Pat Boone, Lesley Gore, the Beatles and Johnny Cash, among many others. In her autobiography, Francis mentioned that in the early years of her career, the language barrier in some European countries, especially in Germany, made it difficult for her songs to get airplay.

Francis used these reflections as the basis for her April 1960 recording, "Everybody's Somebody's Fool" which would go on to become the first single by a female artist to top the Hot 100. Veteran lyricist Ralph Maria Siegel penned a set of German lyrics, named "Die Liebe ist ein seltsames Spiel" ("Love is a Strange Game"), which, after some friction between Francis and her MGM executives, was recorded and released. The song peaked at number 1 in West Germany. She had two more number one hits there, "Paradiso" in September 1962 and "Barcarole in der Nacht" in July 1963.

It was not until her number 7 on the U.S. charts, "Many Tears Ago", later in 1960, that Francis began to record cover versions of her songs in foreign languages other than German. Over the years, she expanded her recording portfolio to 15 languages. She also sang in Romanian during a live performance at the 1970 edition of the Golden Stag Festival in Brașov, Romania. Francis was not fluent in all of these languages, and she had to learn her foreign language songs phonetically.

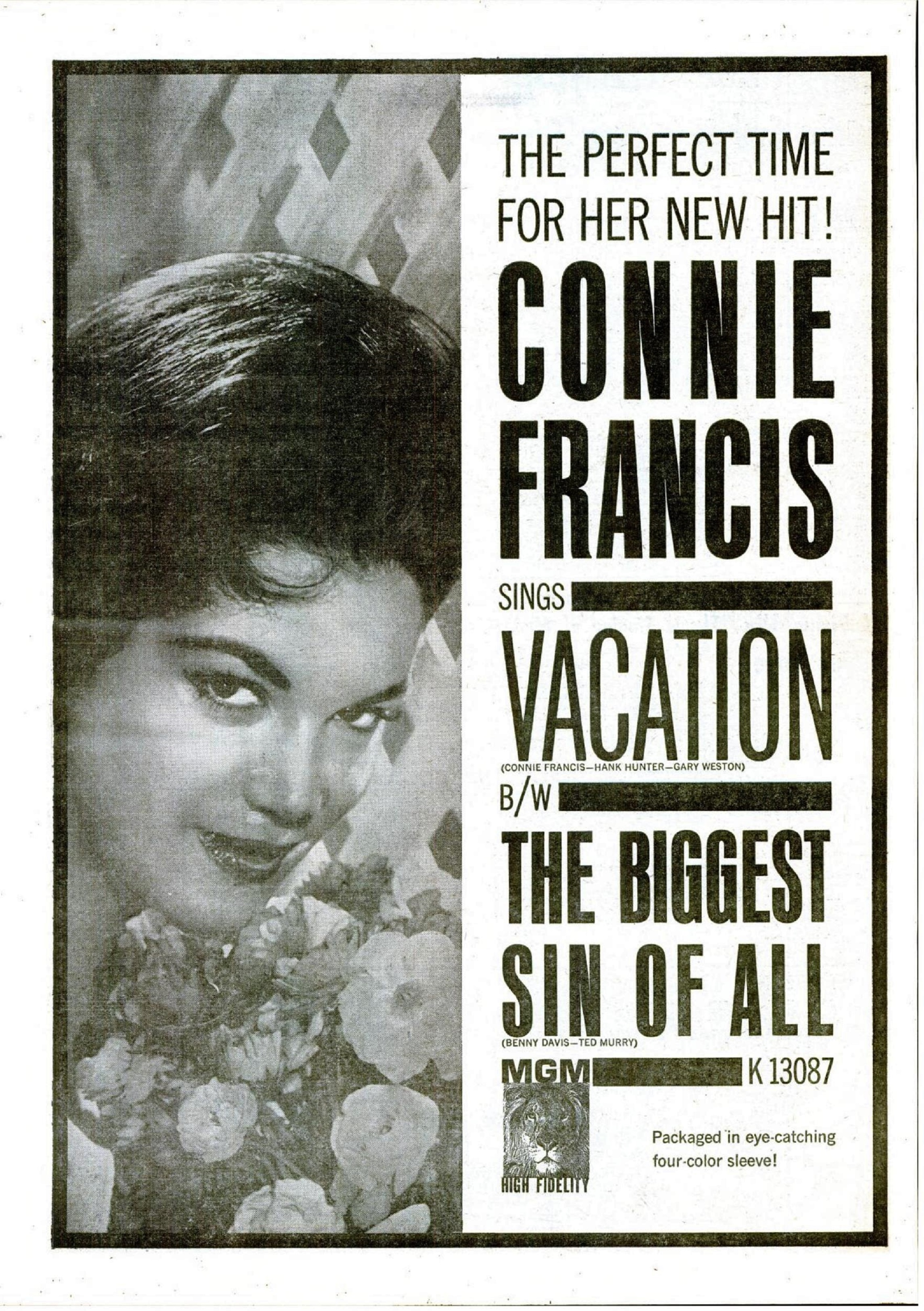
Billboard ad for Francis's final top-ten hit, "Vacation", July 14, 1962

In the wake of "Die Liebe ist ein seltsames Spiel", Francis enjoyed her greatest successes outside the United States. During the 1960s, her songs not only topped the charts in numerous countries around the world, but she was also voted the number 1 singer in over 10 countries. In 1960, she was named the most popular artist in Europe, the first time a non-European received this honor. From mid-1961 to mid-1963, Radio Luxembourg closed each day's broadcasts with "It's Time to Say Goodnight", a song Francis had recorded especially for them, but which was not officially released on record until 1996. Francis's enduring popularity overseas led to television specials in countries around the world such as Great Britain, Germany, Spain, and Italy. Even at the height of the Cold War, Francis's music was well received in Iron Curtain countries, and some of her recordings were made available on state-owned record labels such as Melodiya in the Soviet Union and on Jugoton in Yugoslavia, although it was common knowledge that rock 'n' roll was highly disparaged in Eastern bloc countries.

In the U.S., Connie Francis had a third number-one hit in 1962: "Don't Break the Heart That Loves You", becoming the first woman to achieve three number-one singles on the Billboard Hot 100 and her success led MGM to allow her complete freedom to choose whichever songs she wanted to record.

Francis's first autobiography, For Every Young Heart, was published in 1963. On July 3 that same year, she played a Royal Command Performance for Queen Elizabeth II at the Alhambra Theatre in Glasgow, Scotland. During the height of the Vietnam War in 1967, Francis performed for U.S. troops. The year before, she had recorded a promotional record for US army nurses during a shortage of them because of the war.

Between 1958 and 1964, Francis was the most popular female singer in the United States, with her popularity and chart consistency rivalled only by Brenda Lee. However, due to music trends in the early and mid-1960s, especially the British Invasion, Francis's chart success on Billboard's Hot 100 began to wane after 1963. Her final top-ten hit, "Vacation", co-written by Francis herself, was released in 1962. A number of Francis's singles reached the top 40 on the U.S. Hot 100 in the mid-1960s, with her last top-40 entry in 1964 being her cover version of "Be Anything (but Be Mine)", a 1952 song made famous by singer/bandleader Eddy Howard. Despite her declining success on the Hot 100, Francis remained a top concert draw, and her singles—with a more mature style—were charting on the top quarter of Billboard's Adult Contemporary Charts (then known as the Easy Listening charts). According to critics, A New Kind of Connie... marked the shift to adult-oriented material. Francis enjoyed lasting chart success in the U.S. until her contract with MGM Records expired in 1969.

In 1965, Francis participated in that year's edition of the annual Sanremo Festival, where her team partner was Gigliola Cinquetti and she presented "Ho bisogno di vederti", which reached the final. Francis returned to Sanremo in 1967 to present "Canta ragazzina" with her team partner Bobby Solo. In the U.S., however, "Time Alone Will Tell", Francis's cover version of Sanremo's 1967 winning entry "Non pensare a me" which had been presented by Iva Zanicchi and Claudio Villa, peaked at number 94 on Billboard's Hot 100 and at number 14 on Billboard's AC charts.

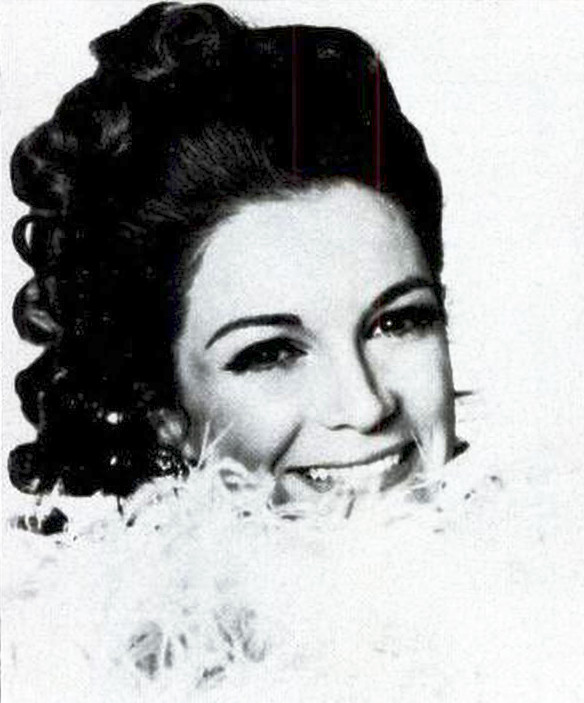
Francis, c. 1970

1966 saw her trying to change up her style, with Francis switching from ballad material like "Roundabout", which was her lowest-charting US single since "Heartaches" in 1958, to dance-beat rockers with the songs "Love Is Me, Love Is You" and "It's a Different World". While "Love Is Me, Love Is You" reached higher positions, peaking at number 66 in the US and reaching the top forty and top seventy in Australia and Canada respectively, the latter had disappointingly bubbled under the Billboard Hot 100, being ranked at number 34. Following her visit to Italy in October 1966 for the choosing of the song she would compete with for the aforementioned 1967 Sanremo festival, the Italian version of "Love Is Me, Love Is You" titled "Cosa C'e Che Non Va" was released.

In 1967, Francis would try to make a revival of a past hit one more time with "My Heart Cries for You". It was predicted to return her to higher position on the pop charts and had a positive critical reception, but once again the single had just bubbled under the Billboard Hot 100. Despite this, she recorded the song in German as "Mein Herz ruft nach dir" and in French as "Mon cœur pleure pour vous", the latter marking her last French-language recording of the 1960s. Francis, reportedly inspired by the success of Arthur Penn's 1967 motion picture Bonnie & Clyde, recorded a jazz album filled with cover songs of standards from the 1930s, titled Connie & Clyde – Hit Songs of the 30s. She followed this project with enthusiasm, with an unusually short preparation time. It was released in May 1968, with a follow-up single lifted from the LP being released the next month. Francis later recalled that it was one of her favorite albums. The next year she switched genres again, and worked with country writers Margaret Lewis and Mira Ann Smith as well as producer Shelby Singleton for The Wedding Cake and the namesake single. The single made Billboard's Country Singles Charts, becoming her first single to do so in nine years. The song was her final Billboard Hot 100 entry as well.

In 1973, Francis returned to the recording studio, cutting "(Should I) Tie a Yellow Ribbon Round the Old Oak Tree?", b/w "Paint the Rain" on GSF Records. This answer song to "Tie a Yellow Ribbon Round the Old Oak Tree" by Tony Orlando & Dawn bubbled under the US pop charts at number 4. The recording of a German version, though, remained unfinished.

=== 1974–1988: Rape and retreat into seclusion ===
After her modest success with "(Should I) Tie a Yellow Ribbon Round the Old Oak Tree?", suggested by her husband at the time, Francis began performing regularly again. While in town to appear at the Westbury Music Fair in New York, on November 8, 1974, Francis was raped at knife point, beaten, and tied to a chair at the Jericho Turnpike Howard Johnson's Lodge in Jericho, New York by a young man. Francis, who was found by police naked, bound and gagged, and still tied to an overturned chair, nearly suffocated under the weight of a heavy mattress the assailant had thrown upon her. She later said that the attacker "was obviously drugged" and "kept asking for money," and stated that he "talked about his mother, about God punishing him because he was going to kill me." Although a 19-year-old guest at the hotel was initially arrested as a suspect, the rapist was never found. Francis thereafter sued the motel chain for failing to provide adequate security and reportedly won a $2.5 million judgment (equivalent to $14,958,256 in 2025), being one of the biggest such judgments at the time, leading to a reform in hotel security. After her attack, Norwegian inventor Tor Sørnes was inspired to invent the keycard lock. In the years after the incident, Francis went into depression, taking as many as 50 Darvon pills a day and rarely leaving her home in Essex Fells, New Jersey.

In 1978, Francis returned to the recording studio to cut an album titled Who's Happy Now? The lead recording on this album was a disco version of "Where the Boys Are". That and other songs from the Who's Happy Now? sessions were subsequently recorded in Italian, Spanish, Japanese, and German. The Spanish and German recordings became albums of their own as Connie Francis en Español in Spain and as Was ich bin (transl. What I Am) in Germany. All three albums and the singles culled from them were released on United Artists Records. It would be the last album Francis, who had already withdrawn from touring after the events of 1974, recorded before she underwent nasal surgery and completely lost her voice. She went through three more operations and was unable to sing again until 1981.

Connie Francis hugging Dick Clark after performing on American Bandstand.

Francis returned again to the studio in 1981 to cut "Comme ci, comme ça", and "I'm Me Again", the latter becoming the title track of an album that featured the new songs. It was released by her previous label MGM, although by this point Polydor had taken over it. "I'm Me Again" became Francis's last single to chart on the AC charts, reaching number forty. She was given the song while visiting the office of her manager George Scheck, and according to her, it "changed everything." She resumed performing live, even gracing the American Bandstand 30th Anniversary Special and appearing in the town where she had been raped. Francis's new-found success was short-lived, though. She was diagnosed with manic depression, which again brought her career to a halt; Francis would later state it was a misdiagnosis, along with a concurrent misdiagnosis of attention deficit disorder, and that the medications she had been erroneously prescribed had turned her into "a zombie". She was committed to multiple psychiatric hospitals.

In 1981, Francis's difficulties continued when her brother, George Franconero Jr., to whom she was very close, was shot to death outside his New Jersey home by Mafia hitmen. George was an attorney who had testified against mob activity and refused offers of witness protection. His death forced Francis to stop "wallow[ing] in self-pity" and take responsibility for her extended family, noting that the sum of tragedies she had experienced up to then had made her very "angry, and angry is often a good catalyst."

Francis attempted suicide in 1984 and was in a coma for several days. She and her doctors eventually concluded her mental health issues stemmed from post-traumatic stress disorder, primarily related to the events of 1974.

In 1984, Francis wrote and published her autobiography, Who's Sorry Now? which became a New York Times bestseller.

=== 1989–2018: Later career ===
In 1989, Francis resumed her recording and performing career once again. For Malaco Records, Francis recorded a double album titled Where the Hits Are, containing re-recordings of 18 of her biggest hits, as well as six classics of yesteryear Francis had always wanted to record such as "Are You Lonesome Tonight?" and "Torn Between Two Lovers".

In 1992, a medley of remixed versions of her biggest German hits charted in Germany. A single, entitled "Jive, Connie", ended up among the top-ten best-selling singles of the year, which brought Francis the prestigious R.SH-Gold award for the "Best Comeback of the Year" from R.SH (short for "Radio Schleswig-Holstein"), then one of Germany's most important private radio stations. A subsequent compilation album of her biggest German hits in their original versions was also released successfully in Germany and Austria.

In 1996, Francis released the live album The Return Concert: Live at Trump's Castle. That same year, she also released With Love to Buddy, a tribute album of songs made famous by the late Buddy Holly.

In late December 2004, Francis headlined in Las Vegas for the first time since 1989. In March and October 2007, Francis performed to sold-out crowds at the Castro Theatre in San Francisco. She appeared in concert in Manila, Philippines, on Valentine's Day 2008. In 2010, Francis appeared at the Las Vegas Hilton with Dionne Warwick, a show billed as "Eric Floyd's Grand Divas of Stage".

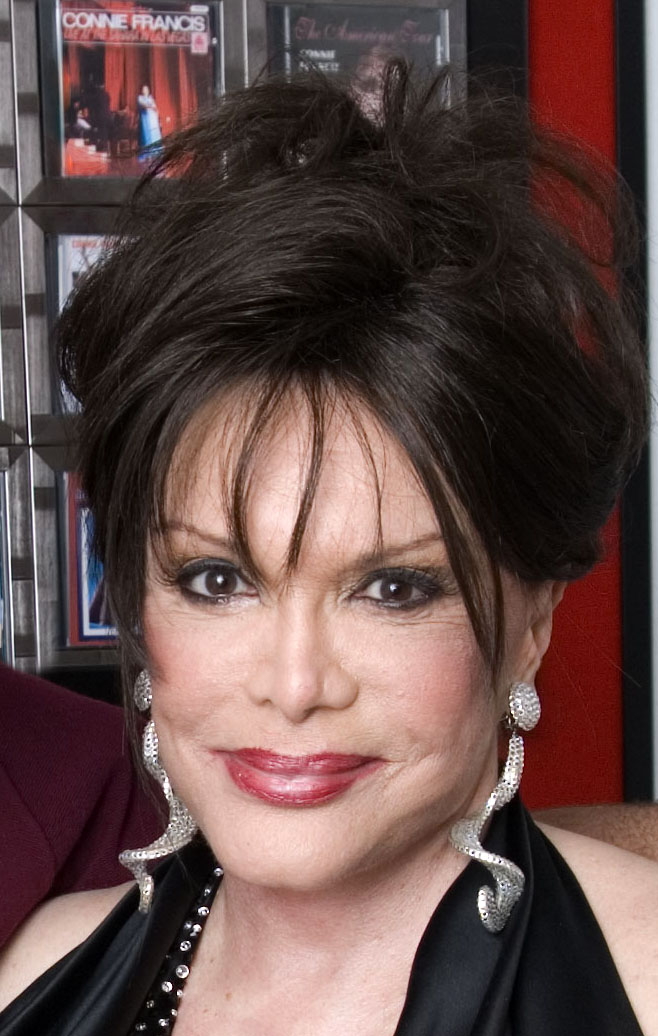
Francis in 2011

In December 2017, Francis released her most recent autobiography, Among My Souvenirs.

=== 2018–2025: Retirement, "Pretty Little Baby" resurgence, and final years ===
Francis retired in 2018, and lived in Florida the remainder of her life. Until 2025, she had fallen into relative obscurity as a victim of the oldies format's decline and shift away from early 1960s music; a 2022 survey noted that Francis had more of her songs dropped from radio airplay than anyone other than the Osmond family. In May 2025, her 1962 song "Pretty Little Baby" went viral on TikTok and became a sleeper hit; when reached for comment, Francis said she had forgotten about the song but was pleased that her music—and the innocence it sought to represent—was being embraced by a younger audience. It was released on a 7" single by Republic Records soon after. The song returned Francis to the US charts for the first time in 41 years, making it to No. 13 on the Billboard Bubbling Under the Hot 100, as well as making the top-5 on IMI's India International chart.

With the song's sudden rise in popularity, Francis joined TikTok and had plans to appear on Cousin Brucie's radio show, which she was unable to fulfill due to failing health. She stated she was willing to make television appearances but would not be performing or touring again, and that though she missed performing on stage, "that ship has sailed."

In mid-2025, Francis was hospitalized in Florida for extreme pain related to a hip injury and shared health updates on social media before her death later that year.

Francis died at a hospital in Pompano Beach, Florida, on July 16, 2025, at age 87.

== Work ==
=== Musical genres ===
While her singles mostly followed the popular trends of the time, including rock 'n' roll, novelty songs, the twist, torch ballads, and the girl-group sound developed by Brill Building songwriters Ellie Greenwich and Jeff Barry, Francis's albums showcased a much wider range of musical styles. These included R&B, vocal jazz, country, Broadway standards, children's music, waltzes, spiritual music, schlager music, and traditional songs from various ethnic communities represented in the United States. She also recorded several songs from popular songwriters of the day, such as Burt Bacharach and Hal David, or Les Reed, via tribute albums.

=== Filmography ===
Film title	Year	Role	Co-actors	Director	Producer	Notes	Ref.
Rock, Rock, Rock!	1956	Dori Graham (Singing voice only)	Tuesday Weld, Valerie Harper, Chuck Berry, Lavern Baker	Will Price	Max Rosenberg, Milton Subotsky	Connie Francis provided the singing voice for Tuesday Weld as "Dori Graham"	
Jamboree	1957	Honey Winn (Singing voice only)	Freda Holloway, Paul Carr, Dick Clark	Roy Lockwood	Max Rosenberg, Milton Subotsky	Connie Francis provided the singing voice for Freda Holloway as Honey Winn	
The Sheriff of Fractured Jaw	1958	Miss Kate (Singing voice only)	Jayne Mansfield, Kenneth More, Bruce Cabot, Sid James	Raoul Walsh	David M. Angel	Connie Francis provided the singing voice for Jayne Mansfield as Miss Kate	
Where the Boys Are	1960	Angie	Paula Prentiss, Yvette Mimieux, Dolores Hart, George Hamilton, Jim Hutton	Henry Levin	Joe Pasternak		
Follow the Boys	1963	Bonnie Pulaski	Paula Prentiss, Janis Paige, Russ Tamblyn	Richard Thorpe	Lawrence P. Bachmann	–	
Looking for Love	1964	Libby Caruso	Jim Hutton, Joby Baker, Susan Oliver	Don Weis	Joe Pasternak		
When the Boys Meet the Girls	1965	Ginger Gray	Harve Presnell, Louis Armstrong, Herman's Hermits, Liberace	Alvin Ganzer	Sam Katzman	–	

=== Television ===
Film title	Year	Role	Co-actors	Director	Producer	Ref.
"The Sister and the Savage" (episode of Bob Hope Presents the Chrysler Theatre)	1966	Sister Mary Clare	James Farentino, Steve Carlson	Gerald Mayer	unknown	

=== Bibliography ===
Book title	Publishing year	Publisher	ISBN	Ref.
For Every Young Heart	1963	Prentice Hall	None	
Who's Sorry Now?	1984	St. Martin's Press	0-312-87088-4	
Among My Souvenirs	2017	Concetta Literary Corporation / Baker & Taylor Publisher Services	978-0999238905 (paperback); 978-0999238912 (hardcover)	

== Personal life ==
=== Relationship with Bobby Darin ===
Around 1956, early in her career, Connie Francis was introduced to Bobby Darin, who was also beginning to establish himself as a singer and songwriter for Decca Records. Darin's manager arranged for him to collaborate with Francis on several songs. Although the two occasionally disagreed over song material, they developed a romantic relationship after several weeks. Francis subsequently recorded Darin's song "My First Real Love," which was released as a single.

Francis's strict Italian-American father, George Franconero, disapproved of the relationship and attempted to keep the couple apart. Tensions escalated when Franconero discovered that Darin had proposed that he and Francis elope after one of her performances. Franconero allegedly confronted Darin and drove him out of the building at gunpoint.

Francis saw Darin only twice more: once when the two were scheduled to sing together on the Ed Sullivan Show and again when she got an episode on the TV series This Is Your Life. By the time of the latter's taping, Darin had married actress Sandra Dee. In her 1984 autobiography, Francis stated she and her father were driving into Lincoln Tunnel when the radio DJ announced Dee and Darin's marriage. Her father made it clear that he was glad Darin was no longer part of their lives. Angered, Francis later stated, "I wished that somehow God would cause the Hudson River to come gushing in and entrap us in that tunnel." She wrote that not marrying Darin was the biggest mistake of her life.

=== Later marriages and relationships ===
Francis was married four times. In 1964 she was briefly married to Dick Kanellis, a press agent and entertainment director for the Aladdin Hotel. In January 1971 she married Izzy Marion, a hair-salon owner, divorcing 10 months later. In 1973, Francis married for the third time – her only marriage to last more than a few months – to Joseph Garzilli, a restaurateur and travel-agency owner; they divorced in 1977. She had no biological children. However, during the third marriage Francis adopted a baby boy. Francis married TV producer Bob Parkinson on June 27, 1985, divorcing later that year.

Francis was in a long-term relationship with Tony Ferretti from around 2003 until his death in 2022. On February 13, 2022, a video uploaded to her official YouTube channel featured Francis and Ferretti performing a duet of the song "You Made Me Love You".

=== Biopic ===
Francis and singer Gloria Estefan completed a screenplay for a film based on Francis's life titled Who's Sorry Now? Estefan announced that she would produce and play the lead. She said, "[Connie Francis] isn't even in the Rock and Roll Hall of Fame, and yet she was the first female pop star worldwide, and has recorded in nine languages. She has done a lot of things for victims' rights since her rape in the '70s ... There's a major story there." In December 2009 the film project was dropped. According to Francis:

They chose to use amateur writers to write the screenplay. I wanted the writer Robert Freeman who wrote that miniseries Life with Judy Garland: Me and My Shadows, which won I don't know how many Emmy Awards, but Gloria and company were unwilling to hire that writer. I absolutely adored his screenplay of Judy's life ... he was so eager to do my life story for film, but she [Gloria] wouldn't agree to hire him and that was the end of that. And I'm sorry I wasted ten years with those people [the Estefans].

In the same article, Francis said that Dolly Parton had been contacting her for years trying to produce her life story, but owing to her previous commitment to Estefan's organization, she was not able to accept Parton's offer. She said in the article that both she and Parton had considered, independently of each other, actress Valerie Bertinelli to play Francis.

=== Characterization on Broadway ===
Francis has been portrayed by Gracie Lawrence, Sarah Hyland, Isa Briones, Olivia Holt, and Ariana Madix in the musical Just in Time on Broadway, based on the life of singer Bobby Darin. The musical premiered on April 23, 2025 with Gracie Lawrence as Connie Francis, which Francis had planned on seeing should her health had recovered.

=== Politics and activism ===
In 1963, Francis recorded "In the Summer of His Years", a tribute to the recently assassinated president John F. Kennedy, which became one of the first charity singles. The following year, she appeared at a presidential campaign rally for Lyndon B. Johnson's election bid, singing "He's Got the Whole World in His Hands".

Francis supported Richard Nixon's 1968 bid for the presidency, and she recorded a campaign song for him.

She also performed for the United Service Organizations, and was the spokeswoman for Mental Health America's trauma campaign in 2010.

In a 2011 interview, Francis described herself as "a die-hard liberal".

=== Lawsuits ===
On November 27, 2002, Francis filed suit against Universal Music Group (UMG). She alleged that the label had underreported and underpaid her artist royalties, and had inflicted severe emotional distress and violated her moral rights when, without her permission, it synchronized several of her songs into "sexually themed" movies: the 1994 film Postcards from America, the 1996 film The Craft, and the 1999 film Jawbreaker. This suit was dismissed.

Francis also sued the producers of Jawbreaker for using her song "Lollipop Lips", which is heard during a sex scene.

== Illness and death ==
Francis suffered a hip injury in early 2025 and subsequently required a wheelchair; she was undergoing stem cell therapy and had hopes of fully recovering as recently as May. In late June 2025, she stated she had been experiencing pelvic pain on her right side and was advised that it was due to a fracture. She said that she would need to rely on her wheelchair longer than anticipated while recovering. She was hospitalized in Florida on July 2 due to a recurrence of extreme pain. She underwent a series of tests and examinations while in intensive care and was later transferred to a private room. In a Facebook post, she speculated that her symptoms might be related to the fracture. On July 4, she reported feeling much better after a good night. She was later discharged from the hospital but soon began to deteriorate and lost consciousness for the final time on July 14.

Francis died in Pompano Beach, Florida, on July 16, 2025, at the age of 87. Her longtime friend and publicist Ron Roberts announced her death the following day and later confirmed that she had been diagnosed with pneumonia the day before she died. By the time of her death, Francis had become one of the best-selling music artists in history, exceeding 200 million records sold during her career. Her crypt is at The Garden of Boca Raton Cemetery in Boca Raton.

== Recognition ==
In 2001, "Who's Sorry Now?" was named one of the Songs of the Century.

A "Connie Francis Way" street sign is displayed at the corner of Greylock Parkway and Forest Street in Belleville, New Jersey, near the house in which she grew up.

Year	Award giving body	Category	Nominated work	Results	Ref.
1958	Billboard	Most Promising Female Vocalist	—N/a	Won	
1969	Awit Awards	Female Recording Artist of the Year (Foreign Division)	—N/a	Won	
2009	Italian Walk of Fame	Celebrity Inductee	—N/a	Won	
