= List of films based on the Bible =

This is a list of movies (including television movies) based on the Bible (Old Testament and New Testament), depicting characters or figures from the Bible, or broadly derived from the revelations or interpretations therein.

== Hebrew Bible (Old Testament) ==
=== Genesis ===
==== Genesis Creation Narrative ====
- The Green Pastures (1936)
- I patriarchi (1964) (Italy)
- The Bible: In the Beginning... (1966)
- Greatest Heroes of the Bible: Tower of Babel (1979, TV episode)
- The New Media Bible: Book of Genesis (1979)
- Genesis: The Creation and the Flood (1994)
- In the Beginning (2000 miniseries)

==== Adam and Eve - Genesis 2-5 ====
- Adam and Eve (1912)
- Adam Og Eva (1953) (Denmark)
- Adán y Eva (1956) (Mexico)
- El pecado de Adán y Eva (1967) (Mexico)
- Ovoce stromů rajských jime (1970) (Czech Republic)
- Allegro Non Troppo (1976) (Italy)
- Adamo ed Eva, la prima storia d'amore (1983) (Italy)
- Adipapam (1988) (India)
- Greatest Heroes and Legends of the Bible: The Garden of Eden (1998, direct-to-video)
- Tropico (2013)

==== The Flood - Genesis 6-9 ====
- Noah's Ark (1928)
- Father Noah's Ark (1933)
- Noah's Ark (1959)
- Greatest Heroes of the Bible: The Story of Noah (1978, TV episode)
- O Trapalhão na Arca de Noé (1983) (Brazil)
- La Biblia en pasta (1984) (Spain)
- Stowaways on the Ark (1988) (Germany)
- Noah (1998)
- Fantasia 2000 (1999)
- Noah's Ark (miniseries) (1999)
- Raining Cats and Frogs (2003) (France)
- Noah's Ark (2007) (Argentina, Italy)
- Evan Almighty (2007)
- 40 Days and Nights (2012)
- Noah (2014)
- Ooops! Noah Is Gone... (2015) (Germany, Belgium, Ireland)
- The Ark (2015) (UK)
- VeggieTales: Noah's Ark (2015)

==== Abraham - Genesis 11:26-25:10 ====
- Greatest Heroes of the Bible: Abraham's Sacrifice (1979, TV episode)
- Animated Stories from the Bible: Abraham and Isaac (1992, TBN, TV episode)
- Abraham (1993, TNT Bible Series)
- Abraham: The Friend of God (2008) (Iran)
- Abe and the Amazing Promise (2009)
- Young Abraham (2011)
- His Only Son (2023)

==== Sodom and Gomorrah - Genesis 19 ====
- Lot in Sodom (1933)
- Sodom and Gomorrah (1962)
- Greatest Heroes of the Bible: Sodom and Gomorrah (1979, TV episode)
- Zohi Sdom (2010) (Israel)

==== Isaac and Rebecca - Genesis 24 ====
- Isaac and Rebecca (1953) (Israel)

==== Jacob - Genesis 25:26-49:33 ====
- Jacob: The Man Who Fought with God (1963) (Italy)
- The Story of Jacob and Joseph (1974)
- Greatest Heroes of the Bible: Jacob's Challenge (1979, TV episode)
- Jacob (1994, TNT Bible Series)
- La Genese (1999) (France)

==== Dinah - Genesis 34 ====
- The Red Tent (2014)

==== Joseph - Genesis 37-50 ====
- Joseph in the Land of Egypt (1914)
- The Story of Joseph and His Brethren (1962)
- Greatest Heroes of the Bible: Joseph in Egypt (1978, TV episode)
- Animated Stories from the Bible: Joseph in Egypt (1992, TBN, TV episode)
- Joseph (1995) (TNT Bible Series)
- Slave of Dreams (1995)
- Joseph and the Amazing Technicolor Dreamcoat (1999)
- Joseph: King of Dreams (2000)
- The Ballad of Little Joe (2003)
- Joseph: Beloved Son, Rejected Slave, Exalted Ruler (2015)

=== Moses (Exodus - Deuteronomy) ===
- The Ten Commandments (1923)
- The Ten Commandments (1956)
- Moses the Lawgiver (1974)
- Moses und Aron (1975) (Germany)
- Greatest Heroes of the Bible: The Story of Moses (1978, TV episode)
- Greatest Heroes of the Bible: The Ten Commandments (1978, TV episode)
- Dekalog 1-10 (1989, TV series)
- Animated Stories from the Bible: Moses: From Birth to Burning Bush (1993, TBN, TV episode)
- Moses (1995, TNT Bible Series)
- The Prince of Egypt (1998)
- The Ten Commandments: The Musical (2006)
- The Ten Commandments (2007)
- Moe and the Big Exit (2007)
- Exodus: Gods and Kings (2014)
- Os Dez Mandamentos - O Filme (2016) (Brazil)

=== Judges Era ===
==== Joshua and Judges ====
- Jephtah's Daughter: A Biblical Tragedy (1909)
- Gideon and Samson: Great Leaders of the Bible (1965) (Italy)
- Greatest Heroes of the Bible: Joshua & Jericho (1978, TV episode)
- Josh and the Big Wall (1997) (VeggieTales video)
- Gideon: Tuba Warrior (2006) (VeggieTales video)

==== Samson and Delilah - Judges 13-16 ====
- Samson et Delila (1902 film) France
- Samson and Delilah (1922)
- Samson and Delilah (1949)
- Aurat (1953) (India)
- Samson (1964) (India)
- Greatest Heroes of the Bible: Samson and Delilah (1978, TV episode)
- Samson and Delilah (1984, ABC TV film)
- Aaj Ka Samson (1991) (India)
- Samson and Delilah (1996, TNT Bible Series)
- Samson (2018)

==== Ruth ====
- The Story of Ruth (1960)
- Duke and the Great Pie War (2005)
- The Book of Ruth: Journey of Faith (2009)

=== Kings and Queens of Israel ===
==== David - First Samuel 16:1-First Kings 2:11 ====
- The Chosen Prince (1917)
- David and Bathsheba (1951)
- David and Goliath (1960)
- A Story of David (1961)
- Saul and David (1964)
- The Story of David (1976)
- Greatest Heroes of the Bible: David & Goliath (1978, TV episode)
- King David (1985)
- Dave and the Giant Pickle (1996)
- David (1997, TNT Bible Series)
- Greatest Heroes and Legends of the Bible: David and Goliath (1998, direct-to-video)
- King George and the Ducky (2000)
- David and Goliath (2005, Liken Bible Series)
- David and Goliath (2013) (India)
- David and Goliath (2015)
- David and Goliath (2016)
- Of Kings and Prophets (TV miniseries) (2016)
- House of David (TV series) (2025)
- David (2025)

==== Solomon - First Kings 1-11 ====
- The Queen of Sheba (1921)
- Haring Solomon at Reyna Sheba (1952) (Philippines)
- La Regina di Saba (1952) (Italy)
- Solomon and Sheba (1959)
- Solomon (TV Movie) (1973)
- Greatest Heroes of the Bible: The Judgement of Solomon (1978, TV episode)
- Solomon & Sheba (1995) (TV)
- Solomon (1997, TNT Bible Series)
- The Kingdom of Solomon (2010) (Iran)

==== Jezebel - First Kings 16:29-Second Kings 9:37 ====
- Sins of Jezebel (1953)

=== Prophets ===
- Jeremiah (1998, TNT Bible Series)
- Greatest Heroes and Legends of the Bible: Jonah and the Whale (1998, direct-to-video)
- Jonah: A VeggieTales Movie (2002)
- Blast and Whisper: Elijah's Story (2010)
- Amazing Love: The Story of Hosea (2012)

=== Exile ===
==== Daniel ====
- Slaves of Babylon (1953)
- Greatest Heroes of the Bible: Daniel in the Lion's Den (1978, TV episode)
- Greatest Heroes of the Bible: Daniel and Nebuchadnezzar (1979, TV episode)
- The Greatest Adventure: Stories from the Bible: Daniel and the Lion's Den (1986, direct-to-video)
- Animated Stories from the Bible: Daniel (1993, TBN, TV episode)
- VeggieTales: Where's God When I'm S-Scared? (1993)
- Rack, Shack, and Benny (1995)
- Greatest Heroes and Legends of the Bible: Daniel and the Lion's Den (1998, direct-to-video)
- Daniel and the Lions (2006, Liken Bible Series)
- The Book of Daniel (2013)
- Daniel and the Fiery Furnace (2026)

==== Esther ====
- Esther and the King (1960)
- The Thirteenth Day: The Story of Esther (1979)
- Greatest Heroes of the Bible: The Story of Esther (1979, TV episode)
- Animated Stories from the Bible: Esther (1993, TBN, TV episode)
- Esther (1999, TNT Bible Series)
- Esther... The Girl Who Became Queen (2000)
- Esther and the King (2006, Liken Bible Series)
- One Night with the King (2006)
- For Such a Time (2010)
- The Book of Esther (2013)

== Deuterocanonical / Apocrypha ==
- Judith of Bethulia (1914)
- Judith and Holofernes (1929)
- Head of a Tyrant (1959)
- The Old Testament (1962) (Book of Maccabees film)

== Christian Bible (New Testament) ==
=== Life of Jesus Christ ===
==== Arabic ====
- The Savior (2014, Palestinian-Bulgarian-Jordanian production)
- Messiah (2020 TV, U.S.)

==== Aramaic/Latin ====
- The Passion of the Christ (2004, Italian-American production) (Aramaic and Latin audio)

==== English ====
- Passion Play (1903)
- The Birth, Life and Death of Christ (1906, France)
- From the Manger to the Cross (1912, U.S.)
- Intolerance (1916, U.S.)
- The King of Kings (1927, U.S.)
- The Great Commandment (1939, U.S.)
- The Robe (1953, U.S.)
- Day of Triumph (1954, U.S.)
- King of Kings (1961, U.S.)
- The Greatest Story Ever Told (1965, U.S.)
- Wednesday Play: Son of Man (1969, U.K.)
- Godspell (1973, U.S.)
- Gospel Road: A Story of Jesus (1973, U.S.)
- Jesus Christ Superstar (1973, U.S.)
- The Passover Plot (1976, U.S.)
- Jesus of Nazareth (1977, U.S.)
- The Nativity (1978 TV, U.S.)
- Jesus (1979, U.S.)
- The New Media Bible: The Gospel According to St. Luke (1979, U.S.)
- A Child Called Jesus (1987, U.S.)}
- The Last Temptation of Christ (1988, U.S.)
- The Revolutionary (1995, U.S.)
- The Revolutionary II (1996, U.S.)
- The Visual Bible: Matthew (1997, South Africa)
- Jesus (1999, U.S.) (TNT Bible Series)
- The Gospel of John (2003, British-Canadian production)
- Son of Man (2006, South Africa)
- Color of the Cross (2006, U.S.)
- The First Christmas (2006, U.S.) (Liken Bible Series)
- The Nativity Story (2006, U.S.)
- The Passion (2008 TV, U.K.)
- The Road to Emmaus (2009, U.S.)
- Killing Jesus (2013, U.S.)
- Son of God (2014, U.S.)
- The Gospel of John (2014, U.S.)
- Last Days in the Desert (2015, U.S.)
- The Young Messiah (2016, U.S.)
- Risen (2016, Spanish-American production)
- Journey to Bethlehem (2023, U.S.)

==== Filipino ====
- Kalbaryo Ni Hesus (1952, Philippines)
- Kristo (1996, Philippines)

==== French ====
- Vie et Passion du Christ (1903, France)
- Golgotha (1935, France)

==== German ====
- I.N.R.I (1923, German Empire)
- Jesus – der Film (1986, West Germany)

==== Italian ====
- Christus (1916, Italy)
- Ponzio Pilato (1962, Italy)
- Il vangelo secondo Matteo (1964, Italy)
- Il messia (1975, French-Italian production)
- L'inchiesta (1986, Italy)
- Un bambino di nome Gesù (1987, Italy)
- L'inchiesta (2006, Italy)

==== Malayalam ====
- Jesus (1973, India)

==== Persian ====
- The Messiah (2007, Iran)

==== Sinhala ====
- Christhu Charithaya (1990, Sri Lanka)
- Jayathu Kristhu (TV 1999, Sri Lanka)
- Jesu Kristhu Yuga Peraliya (TV 2013, Sri Lanka)

==== Spanish ====
- Jesús de Nazareth (1942, Mexico)
- María Magdalena: Pecadora de Magdala (1945, Mexico)
- Reina de reinas: La Virgen María (1945, Mexico)
- El Mártir del Calvario (1952, Mexico)
- El Beso de Judas (1953, Spain)
- El Redentor (1957, Spain)
- El Proceso de Cristo (1965, Mexico)
- Jesús, el niño Dios (1969, Mexico)
- Jesús, María y José (1969, Mexico)
- Jesús, nuestro Señor (1970, Mexico)
- La Vida de Nuestro Señor Jesucristo (1986, Mexico)
- El discípulo (2010, Spain)

==== Telugu ====
- Karunamayudu (1978, India)
- Rajadhi Raju (1980, India)
- Shanti Sandesham (2004, India)
- Mulla Kireetam (2005, India)

==== Animated movies ====
- The Miracle Maker (2000, U.K.)
- The Lion of Judah (2011, U.S.)
- The Star (2017, U.S.)
- The King of Kings (2025, South Korea)
- Light of the World (2025, US)
- The Animated Bible Series (free and open content work-in-progress project)

=== Mary, Mother of Jesus ===
- Saint Mary (2000, Iran)
- Mary, Mother of Jesus (1999 TV, U.S.)
- Marie de Nazareth (1995, France)
- Mary of Nazareth (2012, Italy)
- Full of Grace (2015)
- Mary (2024, British-American-Moroccan production)

=== Herod the Great ===
- Erode il Grande (1959, Italy)

=== Mary Magdalene ===
- Magdalanaattu Mary (1957, India)
- The Friends of Jesus - Mary Magdalene (2000)
- Mary Magdalene (2018, U.S.)

=== John the Baptist ===
- Snapaka Yohannan (1963, India)

=== Salome ===
- Salome (1908)
- Salomè (1910, Italy)
- Salomé (1918, U.S.)
- Salomé (1923, U.S.)
- Salome (1953, U.S.)
- Salome (1972, Italy)
- Salome (1978, Spain)
- Salomè (1986, French-Italian production)
- Salome's Last Dance (1988, U.K.)
- Salomé (2002, Spain)
- Salome (2007, U.S.)
- Wilde Salomé (2011, U.S.)
- Salomé (2013, U.S.)

=== Judas Iscariot ===
- Blade af Satans bog (1920, Denmark)
- El beso de Judas (1953, Spain)
- Neither Are We Enemies (1970 TV, U.S.)
- The Friends of Jesus - Judas (2001 TV, Italy)
- Judas (2004, American-Moroccan production)
- Story of Judas (2015, France)

=== Barabbas ===
- Barabbas (1953, Sweden)
- Give Us Barabbas! (1961 TV)
- Barabba (1961, Italian-American production)
- Barabbas (1964, Belgium)
- Barabbas (2005 TV, India)
- Barabba (2012 TV, Italian-American production)

=== Parable of the Prodigal Son ===
- L'Enfant prodigue (1907, France)
- L'Enfant prodigue (1916, France)
- The Prodigal (1955, U.S.)

=== Life of the Apostles ===
- The Big Fisherman (1959, U.S.)
- Thomasleeha (1975, India)
- Peter and Paul (1981 TV, U.S.)
- A.D. Anno Domini (1985, Italian-American production)
- Dayamayudu (1987, India)
- The Visual Bible: Acts (1994, U.S.)
- The Emissary (1997)
- Stephen's Test of Faith (1998)
- St. Paul (a. k. a. Paul the Apostle) (2000)
- St. Peter (2005 TV)
- Saul: The Journey to Damascus (2014, Malta)
- The Friends of Jesus - Thomas (2001, Italy)
- Apostle Peter and the Last Supper (2012, U.S.)
- A.D. The Bible Continues (2015, U.S.)
- Paul, Apostle of Christ (2018, U.S.)
- Acts of the Apostles (1969 TV, Italy)
- Juan Apóstol, el más amado (2016, Mexico)

=== Creative ===
- The Fourth Wise Man (1985)
- Jesus of Montreal (1989, French-Canadian production)
- Joshua (2002, U.S.)
- Mary (2005, French-Italian-American production)
- Jesus liebt mich (2012, Germany)
- He Knows My Name (2015)

=== Revelation / Apocalypse ===
- A Thief in the Night (1972, U.S.)
- A Distant Thunder (1978, U.S.)
- The Late Great Planet Earth (1979, U.S.)
- Image of the Beast (1981, U.S.)
- Years of the Beast (1981, U.S.)
- Early Warning (1981, U.S.)
- The Prodigal Planet (1983, U.S.)
- The Seventh Sign (1988, U.S.)
- The Rapture (1991, U.S.)
- Apocalypse (1998, U.S.)
- Apocalypse II: Revelation (1999, U.S.)
- Apocalypse III: Tribulation (1999, U.S.)
- End of Days (1999, U.S.)
- The Moment After (1999, U.S.)
- The Omega Code (1999, U.S.)
- The Apocalypse (2000, TNT Bible Series)
- Left Behind: The Movie (2000, U.S.)
- Apocalypse IV: Judgment (2001, U.S.)
- Megiddo: The Omega Code 2 (2001, U.S.)
- Left Behind II: Tribulation Force (2002, U.S.)
- Apocalypse (2002, TNT Bible Series)
- Six: The Mark Unleashed (2004, U.S.)
- Constantine (2005, U.S.)
- Left Behind: World at War (2005, U.S.)
- The Poor Ones in the Paradise (2005, U.S.)
- The Moment After 2 (2006, U.S.)
- The Book of Eli (2010, U.S.)
- This Is The End (2013, U.S.)
- Left Behind (2014, U.S.)
- JeruZalem (2015, Israel)
- Leap: A Tale of the Last Days (2025, U.S.)

== Fictional Interpolations ==
=== Adam and Eve ===
- Mary's Incredible Dream (1976)
- Year One (2009)
- The Tragedy of Man (2011) (Hungary)

=== Moses ===
- Wholly Moses! (1980)
- The Ten (2007)
- Seder-Masochism (2018)

=== Samson ===
- Hercules, Samson and Ulysses (1963)

=== Ben-Hur ===
- Ben Hur (1907 short)
- Ben-Hur (1925)
- Ben-Hur (1959)
- Ben Hur (2003)
- Ben Hur (2010)
- Ben Hur (2016)

=== Early Christians ===
- Quo Vadis? (1901) (France)
- Quo Vadis? (1910) (France)
- Quo Vadis? (1913) (Italy)
- The Sign of the Cross (1914)
- Quo Vadis? (1924) (Germany)
- The Sign of the Cross (1932)
- Quo Vadis? (1951)
- Demetrius and the Gladiators (1954)
- The Robe (1953)
- The Silver Chalice (1954)
- Punitha Anthoniyar (1977) (India)
- Monty Python's Life of Brian (1979) (UK)
- Deux heures moins le quart avant Jésus-Christ (1982) (France)
- Quo Vadis? (2001) (Poland)
- Agora (2009) (Spain)

=== Opus Dei ===
- The Da Vinci Code (2006)

== See also ==
- The Bible in film
- Dramatic portrayals of Jesus Christ
  - List of actors who have played Jesus
- List of apocalyptic films
- List of Christian films
- List of Islamic films
- Lists of movie source material

== Print sources ==
- Reinhartz, Adele (2016). Bible and Cinema: Fifty Key Films. De Gruyter. ISBN 978-1-61451-561-6.
- Burnette-Bletsch, Rhonda (2013). The Bible in Motion. A Handbook of the Bible and Its Reception in Film. Routledge. ISBN 978-0415677202.
- Baugh, Lloyd (1997). Imaging the Divine: Jesus and Christ-figures in Film. Sheed & Ward. ISBN 1556128630.
