= Bible Collection =

The Bible Collection
- Production companies: Lux Vide; Beta Film
- Distributed by: TNT; RAI
- Language: English

The Bible Collection is a series of films produced for the TNT and RAI television networks, starting with Abraham in April 1994 and ending with Thomas in April 2001. The Bible Collection consists of a 27-part miniseries in 17 volumes.

The series grew out of an earlier series of Old Testament films produced by the Italian company Five Mile River Films in the 1990s.

== Films ==
The films, originally aired as standalone television movies or as short miniseries, have been gathered and released in a numbered collection, with the secondary series title Close to Jesus on installments covering events during the lifetime of Jesus. The order of the collection may vary slightly from the order in which the films were originally produced.

#	Title	Year	Director(s)	Biblical figure(s)	Runtime
1	Abraham	1993	Joseph Sargent	Abraham	184 minutes
2	Genesis: The Creation and the Flood	1994	Ermanno Olmi	Noah	93 minutes
3	Jacob	1994	Peter Hall	Jacob	93 minutes
4	Joseph	1995	Roger Young	Joseph	185 minutes
5	Moses	1995	Roger Young	Moses	182 minutes
6	Samson and Delilah	1996	Nicolas Roeg	Samson and Delilah	179 minutes
7	David	1997	Robert Markowitz	David	173 minutes
8	Solomon	1997	Roger Young	Solomon	170 minutes
9	Jeremiah	1998	Harry Winer	Jeremiah	91 minutes
10	Esther	1999	Raffaele Mertes	Esther	87 minutes
11	Jesus	1999	Roger Young	Jesus	174 minutes
12	Joseph of Nazareth	2000	Raffaele Mertes	Saint Joseph	100 minutes
13	Mary Magdalene	2000	Raffaele Mertes	Mary Magdalene	99 minutes
14	Paul the Apostle	2000	Roger Young	Paul the Apostle	177 minutes
15	Judas	2001	Raffaele Mertes	Judas Iscariot	90 minutes
16	Thomas	2001	Raffaele Mertes	Thomas the Apostle	93 minutes
17	The Apocalypse	2002	Raffaele Mertes	John the Apostle	93 minutes

== See also ==
- List of films based on the Bible
- Restless Heart: The Confessions of Saint Augustine, co-produced by Lux Vide and Rai Fiction

== Print sources ==
- Burnette-Bletsch, Rhonda. The Bible in Motion. A Handbook of the Bible and Its Reception in Film. De Gruyter. pp. 59, 112, 507. ISBN 978-1-61451-561-6.
