= Lux Vide =

Italian television production company

Lux Vide S.p.A.
- Type: Società per azioni (S.p.A.)
- Industry: Entertainment
- Founded: 1992; 34 years ago
- Founder: Ettore Bernabei; Matilde Bernabei
- Headquarters: Rome, Italy
- Key people: Matilde Bernabei (President)
- Products: Television series; Films
- Parent: Fremantle (2022–present)
- Website: luxvide.it

Lux Vide S.p.A. is an Italian television production company founded by Ettore Bernabei and Matilde Bernabei. It has produced television series including Don Matteo (2000–present), Medici (2016–2019), Devils (2020–2022), and Leonardo (2021).

== History ==
Lux Vide was founded by Ettore Bernabei and his daughter, Matilde Bernabei, in 1992. Ettore's son, Luca Bernabei, became CEO in 2015. In March 2022, Fremantle acquired a majority stake in the company. In 2023, the company opened a soundstage, Teatro 5, in Formello.

In July 2025, Luca Bernabei stepped down as president of the company, with his sister, Matilde, taking his place. That month, Fremantle's stake in the company increased from 70% to 100%.

== Filmography ==
=== Television ===
Year	Title	Network	Ref.
1993	Abraham	Rai 1	
1994	Jacob	Rai 1	
1995	Joseph	Rai 1	
1995–1996	Moses	Rai 1	
1996	Uno di noi	Rai 1	
1996	Samson and Delilah	Rai 1	
1996–1998	Dio vede e provvede	Italia 1	
1997	David	Rai 1	
1997	Nuda proprietà vendesi	Rai 1	
1997	Fátima	Canale 5	
1997	Solomon	Rai 1	
1998	Nicholas' Gift	Canale 5	
1998	Jeremiah	Rai 1	
1998–1999	Lui e lei	Rai 1	
1999	Esther	Rai 1	
1999	Jesus	Rai 1	
1999	Cristallo di rocca - Una storia di Natale	Canale 5	
2000	Joseph of Nazareth	Canale 5	
2000	Mary Magdalene	Canale 5	
2000	Lourdes	Rai 1	
2000	Vola Sciusciù	Rai 1	
2000	Padre Pio: Between Heaven and Earth	Rai 1	
2000	St. Paul	Rai 1	
2000	Questa casa non è un albergo	Rete 4	
2000–present	Don Matteo	Rai 1	
2001	Angelo il custode	Rai 1	
2001	Judas	Canale 5	
2001	Thomas	Canale 5	
2001	La crociera	Rai 1	
2002	Saint Anthony: The Miracle Worker of Padua	Canale 5	
2002	John XXIII: The Pope of Peace	Rai 1	
2002	Dracula	Rai 1	
2002	Il bambino di Betlemme	Canale 5	
2002	The Apocalypse	Rai 1	
2003	Maria Goretti	Rai 1	
2003	Soraya	Rai 1	
2003	Mother Teresa of Calcutta	Rai 1	
2003	Imperium: Augustus	Rai 1	
2004	Nero	Rai 1	
2004	Saint John Bosco: Mission to Love	Rai 1	
2004	Saint Rita	Canale 5	
2005	Meucci - L'italiano che inventò il telefono	Rai 1	
2005	Edda	Rai 1	
2005	Imperium: Saint Peter	Rai 1	
2005	Callas e Onassis	Canale 5	
2005	Pope John Paul II	Rai 1	
2005–2007	Nati ieri	Canale 5	
2007	Imperium: Pompeii	Rai 1	
2007	Clare and Francis	Rai 1	
2007	War and Peace	Rai 1	
2008	Pinocchio	Rai 1	
2008	Coco Chanel	Rai 1	
2008	Paul VI: The Pope in the Tempest	Rai 1	
2008–2010	Ho sposato uno sbirro	Rai 1	
2009	Enrico Mattei: The Man who Looked to the Future	Rai 1	
2010	Restless Heart: The Confessions of Saint Augustine	Rai 1	
2010	Saint Philip Neri: I Prefer Heaven	Rai 1	
2010	Pius XII: Under the Roman Sky	Rai 1	
2011	Atelier Fontana - Le sorelle della moda	Rai 1	
2011	Cinderella	Rai 1	
2011–present	Un passo dal cielo	Rai 1	
2011–present	Che Dio ci aiuti	Rai 1	
2012	Mary of Nazareth	Rai 1	
2012	One Thousand and One Nights	Rai 1	
2012	Santa Barbara	Rai 1	
2012–2013	Talent High School - Il sogno di Sofia	Super!	
2013	Anna Karenina	Rai 1	
2014	Romeo and Juliet	Canale 5	
2014	Beauty and the Beast	Rai 1	
2015	La dama velata	Rai 1	
2015–2017	Sotto copertura	Rai 1	
2016	Non dirlo al mio capo	Rai 1	
2016–2019	Medici	Rai 1	
2017	C'era una volta Studio Uno	Rai 1	
2017–2019	L'isola di Pietro	Canale 5	
2020–present	Doc – Nelle tue mani	Rai 1	
2020–2022	Devils	Sky Atlantic	
2021	Leonardo	Rai 1	
2021–2023	Buongiorno, mamma!	Canale 5	
2021–present	Blanca	Rai 1	
2022	Apnea	RaiPlay	
2022–2023	I Hate Christmas	Netflix	
2022–present	Viola	Canale 5	
2024	The Fantastic 5	Canale 5	
2025	Hotel Costiera	Amazon Prime Video	
2025	Sandokan	Rai 1	
2026	ChiaroScuro	Netflix	
TBA	Carvaggio	TBA	
TBA	Floating Lives	TBA	
TBA	Michelangelo	TBA	
TBA	The Rising	TBA	

=== Film ===
Year	Title	Director	Ref.
2013	White as Milk, Red as Blood	Giacomo Campiotti	
2014	Unique Brothers	Alessio Maria Federici	
