= List of Turner Pictures films =

The following is a list of films produced by Turner Pictures, a unit of Turner Broadcasting System.

== Theatrical films ==
While Turner Pictures Worldwide handled international sales for all these films, North American distribution usually went to various distributors depending on the movie, usually by New Line Cinema, which Turner acquired in 1994. Currently, Warner Bros. Pictures owns worldwide distribution rights to these films except for North American rights to Andre and The Pagemaster.

Release date	Title	Co-production with	Note(s)
October 1, 1992 (Germany) July 30, 1993 (United States)	Tom and Jerry: The Movie	Film Roman and WMG	distributed in the U.S. by Miramax Films on behalf of Live Entertainment
October 8, 1993	Gettysburg	Esparza/Katz Productions	distributed by New Line Cinema; originally planned as a TV miniseries
August 19, 1994	Andre	Paramount Pictures and The Kushner-Locke Company	North American rights owned by Paramount Pictures
November 23, 1994	The Pagemaster	20th Century Fox, Turner Feature Animation and Colbath	North American rights owned by The Walt Disney Company via 20th Century Studios
September 15, 1995	Angus	BBC, Atlas Entertainment, Syalis D.A., Tele Munchen Gruppe, and Quality Entertainment	distributed by New Line Cinema
December 25, 1996	Michael	Alphaville Films	distributed by New Line Cinema
March 26, 1997	Cats Don't Dance	Turner Feature Animation	distributed by Warner Bros. Pictures as a result of Time Warner's acquisition of Turner Broadcasting System
January 16, 1998	Fallen	Atlas Entertainment	distributed by Warner Bros. Pictures as a result of Time Warner's acquisition of Turner Broadcasting System
May 29, 1998	Almost Heroes	Di Novi Pictures	distributed by Warner Bros. Pictures as a result of Time Warner's acquisition of Turner Broadcasting System

== TV movies and miniseries ==
These films originally aired on TNT in the U.S. except where noted.

Air date	Title	Co-production with	Note(s)
December 11, 1989	Dinner at Eight		
January 8, 1990	Max and Helen	Citadel Entertainment	
January 22, 1990	Treasure Island	Agamemnon Films and British Lion Film Corporation	
February 19, 1990	Montana	HBO Pictures, Roger Grimbel Productions, and Zoetrope Studios	
August 20, 1990	Ivory Hunters	National Audubon Society, RHI Entertainment and Qintex Entertainment	
October 15, 1990	The Court-Martial of Jackie Robinson	Von Zerneck Sertner Films	
January 28, 1991	Which Way Home	Southern Star Entertainment	miniseries; aired on Network Ten in Australia
March 11, 1991	Ironclads	Rosemont Productions	
April 8, 1991	Never Forget	Nimoy/Radnitz Productions	
April 22, 1991	Chernobyl: The Final Warning	Carolco Television Productions	
September 9, 1991	Final Verdict	Foxboro Company Productions	
September 9, 1991	Grand Isle		
December 9, 1991	Miracle in the Wilderness	Ruddy & Morgan Productions	
April 13, 1992	Christmas in Connecticut	Once Upon a Time Productions	
June 9, 1992	Keep the Change	High Horse Films and The Steve Tisch Company	
August 10, 1992	Crazy in Love		
November 2, 1992	T Bone N Weasel		
January 26, 1993	Cooperstown	Amblin Television and Majestic Films International	aired on TBS
February 13, 1993	The Portrait		
February 20, 1993	The Heart of Justice	Amblin Television, Brandman Productions, and Planet Productions	
September 7, 1993	Percy & Thunder	Amblin Television and Writers Cinema	
November 7, 1993	Zelda		
December 5, 1993	Geronimo		
February 6, 1994	The Cisco Kid		
June 12, 1994	Amelia Earhart: The Final Flight	Avenue Pictures Productions	
September 3, 1994	Scooby-Doo! in Arabian Nights	Hanna-Barbera	aired in first run syndication
November 6, 1994	In Search of Dr. Seuss	Point Blank Productions	
November 21, 1994	A Flintstones Christmas Carol	Hanna-Barbera	aired in first run syndication
March 5, 1995	The Good Old Boys	Edgar J. Scherick Associates, Firebrand Productions, and The Javelina Film Company	
October 15, 1995	The Heidi Chronicles		
December 20, 1995	Moses	Antena 3, Beta Film, British Sky Broadcasting, Ceska Televize, France 2 Cinema, Lube Productions, Lux Vide, MTM Enterprises, Nederlandse Christilijke Radio-Vereniging, Quinta Communications, RAI, and Taurus Film	miniseries; part of TNT's Bible Collection
March 3, 1996	Andersonville		
November 10, 1996	The Man Who Captured Eichmann	Butcher's Run Films and Stan Margulies Company	
April 6, 1997	David	Five Mile River Films, Beta Film, Lube Productions, Lux Vide, and RAI	
July 20, 1997	Rough Riders	Affinity Entertainment, Esparza Katz, and Larry Levinson Productions	miniseries; part of TNT's Bible Collection
October 27, 1998	CHiPs '99		based on the 1977-1983 series CHiPs by MGM Television
