= The Apocalypse (2000 film) =

2002 multi-national TV film

- Written by: Francesco Contaldo and Gianmario Pagano
- Directed by: Raffaele Mertes
- Starring: Richard Harris; Bruce Payne
- Countries of origin: France; Germany; Italy; United Kingdom
- Original language: English

Production
- Running time: 96 minutes

Original release
- Release: 2002

Apocalypse or The Apocalypse (known in Australia as Revelation, the original title is San Giovanni – L'apocalisse) is a biblical telefilm produced for European television released in 2002 starring Richard Harris (in one of his final film roles) and co-starring Bruce Payne.

== Plot ==
The film is set in AD 90 and concerns Jesus Christ's last surviving apostle, John, and his writings and visions from the Apocalypse of John. Emperor Domitian declares himself to be God and ruler over heaven and earth. The Christians do not recognize his divinity and face persecution from the God-Emperor. John has been banished to the island of Patmos, a Roman mining penal colony, with many others. The film follows Victorinus of Pettau's descriptions of the harsh conditions that John endured working in the mines on the island of Patmos. He writes out messages of his visions and sends the "Revelation of God" to the seven churches of Greek Asia Minor. The Christian church in Ephesus sends Irene to make sure John is alive and to confer with him in person. The movie depicts scenes from the Book of Revelation and links them to events happening to the church in Asia.

== Biblical scenes portrayed ==
Revelation 1, Jesus among the Candlesticks
Revelation 4, The Throne Scene
Revelation 5, The Crisis of Sealed Scroll
Revelation 6, The Seals Opened and Related Events
Revelation 7, The Great Multitude
Revelation 8, The Trumpets
Revelation 12, The Woman, the Child and the Dragon
Revelation 21–22, A New Heaven & A New Earth, Jesus Returns

== Historical events portrayed ==
The movie Apocalypse includes these historical events:

1. The Life and Reign of Domitian with his proclamation of divine status and persecution of Christians.
2. Patmos as a penal colony

Apocalypse events mentioned in early Christian literature:

Eusebius, in Ecclesiastical History 3:18–20

3:17 – Domitian conducted a reign of terror
3:18–1 – During this time, John was exiled to Patmos.
3:18–3 – Irenaeus wrote that John lived during the reign of Domitian.
3:20–10 – Domitian died and Nerva took over. Nerva tried to undo some of the results of Domitian's cruelty.
3:20 – John returned to Ephesus at this time.

== Cast ==
- Richard Harris as John the Apostle
- Vittoria Belvedere as Irene
- Benjamin Sadler as Valerius
- Christian Kohlund as Quintus Maximus, a general
- Erol Sander as Ionicus, Irene's brother
- Ian Duncan as Demetrius
- Bruce Payne as Domitian

== Production ==
The TV movie was the last of the many movies based on Bible stories produced by Lux Vide. The films that Lux Vide had produced prior to it included Genesis: The Creation and the Flood, Jacob, Joseph, Moses, Samson and Delilah, David, Solomon, Jeremiah, Esther and Jesus.

== Reception ==
The TV movie received mixed reviews. Luisa Sandrone of Famiglia Cristiana wrote that Harris gave a "masterful performance" in the film. Marcus Jäntsch of peplumania.com gave the film 3 out of 5 stars. Peter T. Chattaway of patheos.com gave the film 2 out of 4 stars.
