= Marco Frisina =

Italian Roman Catholic priest and composer

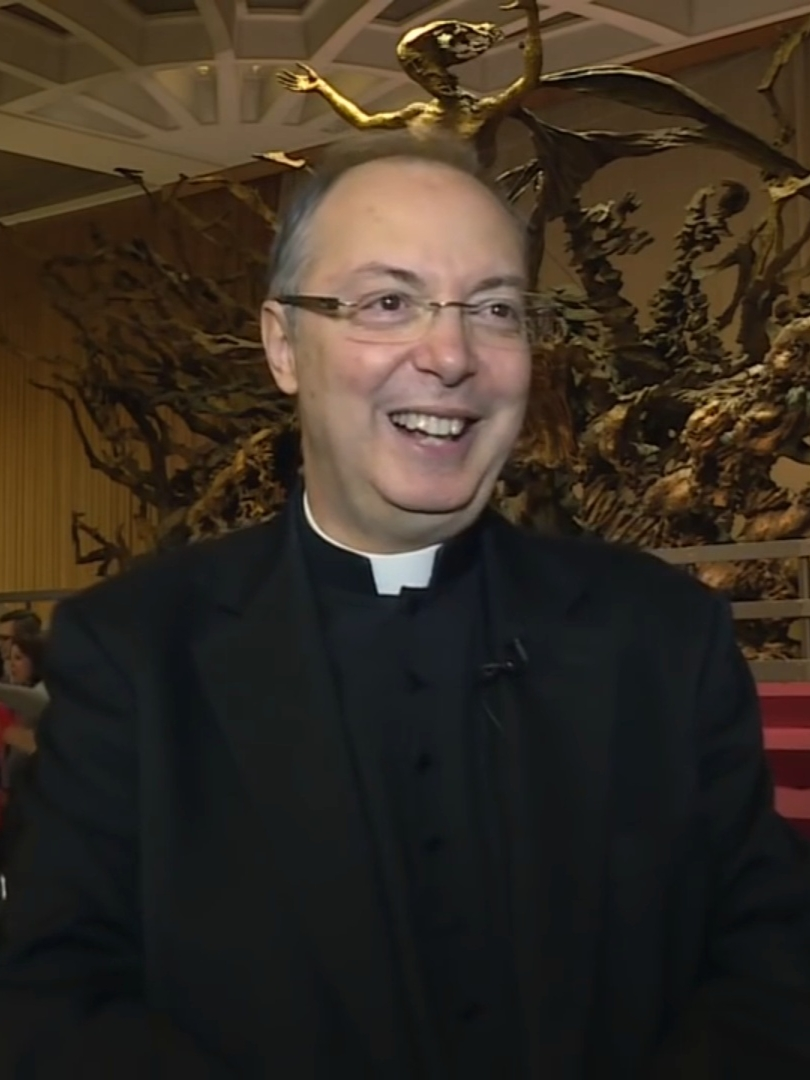
Marco Frisina

Marco Frisina (born 16 December 1954, in Rome) is an Italian Roman Catholic priest and composer. He is director of the Pastoral Worship Center at the Vatican.

== Biography ==
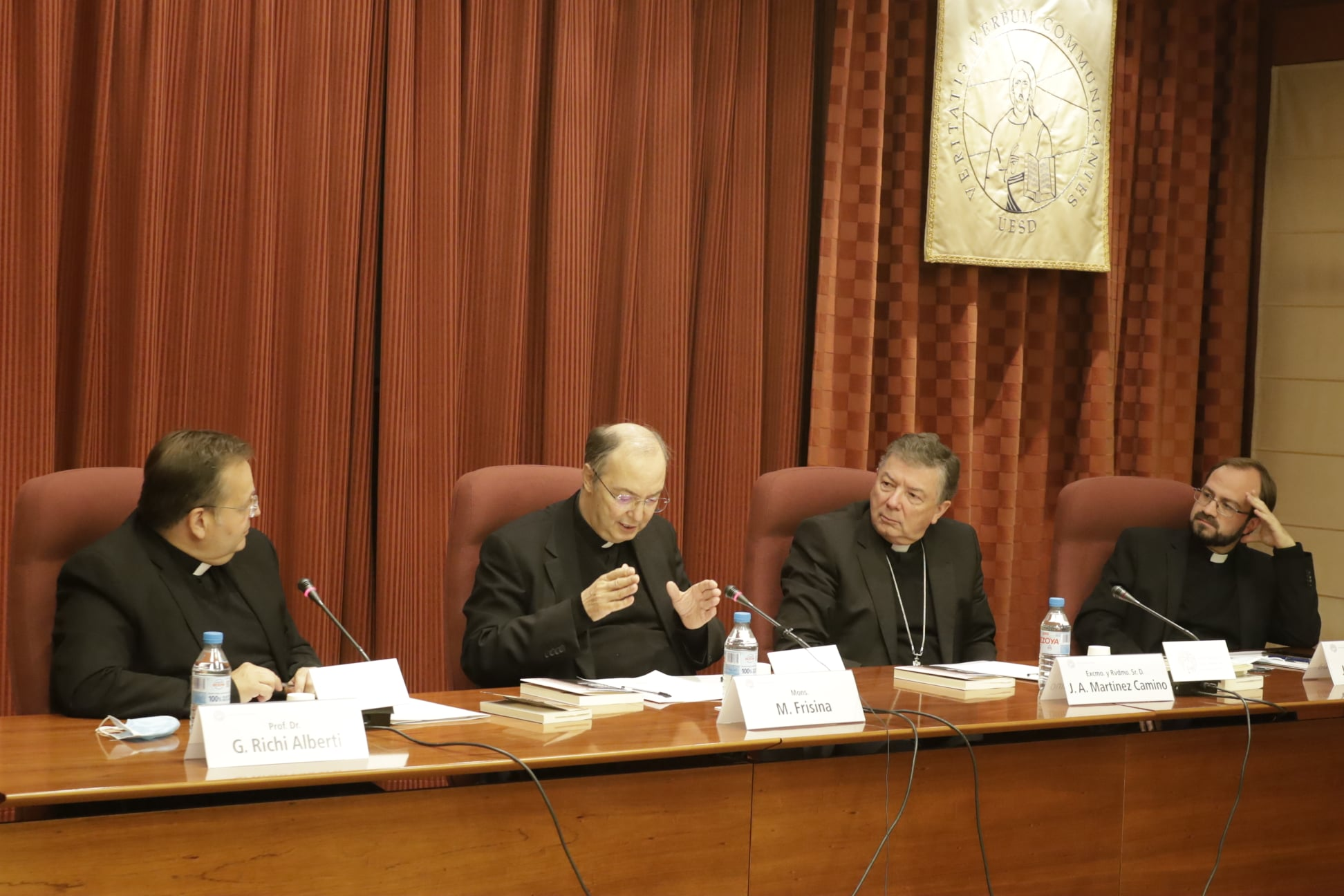
Marco Frisina at the San Damaso University, in Madrid

After the Liceo classico, Frisina graduated in Letters at the Sapienza University of Rome and subsequently in composition at the Conservatorio Santa Cecilia. After having joined the Pontifical Major Seminary of Rome in 1978, Frisina studied theology at the Pontifical Gregorian University and got the license in Holy Scripture at the Pontifical Biblical Institute of Rome.

In 1982 he was ordained a priest and was assigned to the Diocese of Rome. A member of the Pontifical Council for Promoting the New Evangelization, he was promoted as the chairman of the Diocesan Commission of Holy Arts for the Diocese of Rome and since 2009 rector of the church of Santa Cecilia in Trastevere. He is professor at the Pontifical University of the Holy Cross and at the Pontifical Institute of Sacred Music.

In 1984 he founded the choir of the Diocese of Rome that he directed continuously for over four decades. Formed by 250 elements, the choir got involved in various international events and Holy Masses celebrated by the Pope.

Since 1985 he has been the director of the Lateran Pontifical Pious Chapel in the Archbasilica of Saint John Lateran, a choir which is composed by 32 chantors and 2 organists.

In 1991 Frisina started a collaboration with TV series titled Le storie della Bibbia produced by Lux Vide, in quality of Biblical consultant and musical composer. For what concerns the musical activity, he involved the Italian composer Ennio Morricone.

In 1993 he was appointed as the personal chaplain of the Pope. Four years later, John Paul II made him a virtuous ordinary academic of the Pontifical Academy of Fine Arts and Letters of the Virtuosi al Pantheon, of which Frisina also became the spiritual assistant.

In 2007 he composed the La Divina Commedia Opera Musical (second title L'uomo che cerca l'Amore), the first musical transposition of the work of Dante Alighieri. It was a two acts drama with libretto of Gianmario Pagano and produced by the Musical International Company.

In 2011 he composed the official hymn for the beatification of John Paul II and was the liturgical focal point of the related celebrations.

In September 2014 he organized in Rome the first national congress of the Italian religious choirs, which in October 2016 was followed by the Jubilee of Choirs.

Since 2015, he has been artistic director of the Concert with the Poor and for the Poor held in Paul VI Hall.

He was in charge of the music and direction of the show "Dante in Musica", directed by Andrea Ortis, winner in 2020 of the Persephone Award as best Italian musical of the year.

== Works, editions and recordings ==
- Frisina: Passio Caeciliae. Barbara Vignudelli (soprano), David Sebasti (narrator). Nova Amadeus Chamber Orchestra, Coro Musicanova, Flavio Emilio Scogna. Brilliant Classics

=== Filmography ===
- Abraham - TV film (1994)
- Jacob - TV miniseries (1995)
- Joseph - TV film (1995)
- Moses - TV film (1996)
- Samson and Delilah - TV film (1997)
- Fatima, directed by Fabrizio Costa (1998)
- Tristano e Isotta, directed by Fabrizio Costa (1998)
- Michele Strogoff, directed by Fabrizio Costa (1999)
- Christus, directed by Giulio Cesare Antamoro (1999)
- Joseph of Nazareth, directed by Raffaele Mertes - TV miniseries (1999)
- Mary Magdalene, directed by Raffaele Mertes (2000)
- Un dono semplice, directed by M. Zaccaro (2000)
- Judas, directed by Raffaele Mertes (2000)
- Thomas, directed by Raffaele Mertes (2001)
- Saint Anthony: The Miracle Worker of Padua, directed by Umberto Marino (2001)
- John XXIII: The Pope of Peace, directed by Giorgio Capitani - TV miniseries (2002)
- Il Bambino di Betlemme, directed by Umberto Marino (2002)
- The Apocalypse, directed by Raffaele Mertes - TV miniseries (2002)
- Saint John Bosco: Mission to Love, directed by Lodovico Gasparini - TV miniseries (2004)
- Saint Rita, directed by Giorgio Capitani - TV miniseries (2004)
- Edda, directed by Giorgio Capitani - TV miniseries (2005)
- Imperium: Saint Peter, directed by Giulio Base - TV miniseries (2005)
- Callas e Onassis, directed by Giorgio Capitani - TV miniseries (2005)
- Pope John Paul II, directed by John K. Harrison - TV miniseries (2005)
- Giovanni Paolo II – Amico di tutta l'umanità - animated film (2006)
- Pope John Paul I: The Smile of God, directed by Giorgio Capitani - TV miniseries (2006)
- Imperium: Pompeii, directed by Giulio Base - TV miniseries (2007)
- Clare and Francis, directed by Fabrizio Costa - TV miniseries (2007)
- Paul VI: The Pope in the Tempest, directed by Fabrizio Costa - TV miniseries (2008)
- Puccini, directed by Giorgio Capitani - TV miniseries (2009)
- Saint Philip Neri: I Prefer Heaven, directed by Giacomo Campiotti - TV miniseries (2010)

=== Recordings ===
- 1984 Maria (sacred oratorio for solo, double choir, and orchestra)
- 1986 Benedici il Signore
- 1987 Non temere
- 1988 Signore è il Suo nome
- 1989 Tu sarai profeta
- 1989 Revelación del alma (sacred oratorio for three soloists and orchestra)
- 1989 Il cantico della misericordia (sacred oratorio for narrator, baritone, mezzo-soprano, choir, and orchestra)
- 1991 Chi ci separerà dall'amore di Cristo?
- 1991 Giovanni, il profeta (sacred oratorio for solo, narrator, double choir, and orchestra)
- 1992 San Francesco. Il tesoro e la sposa (sacred oratorio)
- 1993 San Massimiliano Kolbe. Chiamati a dare la vita (sacred oratorio)
- 1995 Tu sei bellezza
- 1995 Elia. La parola del fuoco (sacred oratorio)
- 1995 San Filippo Neri. Paradiso, paradiso... (sacred oratorio)
- 1996 Santa Caterina. Le nozze mistiche (sacred oratorio)
- 1997 Cristo nostra salvezza
- 1997 Rublev. Signore di ogni bellezza (sacred oratorio)
- 1998 Laudate Dominum
- 1998 Non di solo pane
- 1998 Natale a Roma (with P. Moloney)
- 1999 San Pietro. Pescatore di uomini (sacred oratorio)
- 1999 Un Natale di fine millennio
- 2000 Pane di vita nuova
- 2000 Jesus is my life
- 2001 Joy to the world
- 2001 Bruno Marchesini. Maestro, dove abiti? (sacred oratorio)
- 2002 Papa Giovanni XXIII. Con la fiducia nel cuore (sacred oratorio)
- 2003 Vergine madre
- 2003 Alba romana. Un omaggio a Roma
- 2003 Confido in Te (sacred oratorio on St. Faustina Kowalska)
- 2004 Cristo è nostra Pasqua
- 2004 Trittico romano (sacred oratorio)
- 2005 Stillate cieli dall'alto
- 2005 Verso la gioia
- 2005 Emmaus. Mane nobiscum domine (sacred oratorio)
- 2005 Santa Margherita da Cortona. La terza luce (sacred oratorio)
- 2005 Jesus Christ you are my life (special disc for the Pope's visit to Germany)
- 2006 Charitatis Hostia – Vittima d'Amore (sacred oratorio on St. Pius of Pietrelcina and St. Francis of Assisi)
- 2006 Una luce nella notte
- 2007 O Luce Radiosa
- 2007 The best of Marco Frisina
- 2008 Apostolo delle genti (sacred oratorio on St. Paul the Apostle)
- 2008 Beato Angelico. Al Signore della bellezza (sacred oratorio)
- 2009 Il Cantico dei Cantici (sacred oratorio)
- 2009 O Croce nostra speranza
- 2011 Aprite le porte a Cristo (hymn to St. John Paul II)
- 2011 Sacerdote per sempre
- 2012 Et incarnatus est
- 2013 Passio Caeciliae (sacred oratorio in 9 scenes for soprano, narrator, and orchestra)
- 2013 Tu sei il Cristo
- 2014 Resurrexit (Latin texts for Easter and Solemnites)
- 2015 Dio ha tanto amato il mondo
- 2016 Benedici Il Signore / Tu Sarai Profeta
- 2017 Non temere / Signore è il suo nome
