= Gianmario Pagano =

Italian screenwriter, presbyter and teacher

- Born: May 3, 1962 (age 64); Rome, Italy
- Education: Pontifical Gregorian University; Pontifical Lateran University; Pontifical Biblical Institute; Sapienza University of Rome
- Occupations: Catholic priest, screenwriter, writer, teacher
- Website: https://bellaprof.blog/informazioni/

Gianmario Pagano is an Italian screenwriter, presbyter and teacher.

== Biography ==
He was ordained priest of the Catholic Church on May 16, 1987. He obtained the Bachelor's degree in Theology and philosophy, the Licentiate degree in Sacred Scripture at the Pontifical Biblical Institute, in 2009 the Master's Degree in Philosophy of Science at the Pontifical Lateran University and in 2017 the Master's Degree in Philosophical Aesthetics at the University of Rome La Sapienza.

He is collaborator in the company Lux Vide of Ettore Bernabei, from 1994 to 2001 is a consultant, producer, screenwriter for the television series Bible Collection (international co-production Lube, RAI, TNT, CBS), winner of the Emmy Award in 1995.

Gianmario Pagano's activity is closely related to the phenomenon of Italian religious and pedagogical fiction of the second half of the 90s, which was aimed at conveying significant, and therefore also religious, content with professionalism and competence; this kind of fiction represented an alternative to the dominant style of telenovelas.

In 2007 he wrote the libretto of The Divine Comedy, with subtitle: "The man seeking love", for the composer Marco Frisina, a musical opera inspired by Dante Alighieri's poem. In the same year he also wrote the screenplay Maria Montessori – Una vita per i bambini which won the award for best screenplay for Italian TV movies at Roma Fiction Fest 2007.

He is teacher of Religion at the high school in Rome (Liceo Scientifico e delle Scienze Umane Statale "Teresa Gullace Talotta" and the Liceo Artistico "Rossellini"). In 2016, he launched the YouTube channel Bella, prof!, a blog and a Facebook page with the aim of maintaining relationships with his former students. The initial project of the channel develops getting the attention of a wider audience, however Pagano's goal is always the same: "...to help those who are interested in understanding what they believe in or, often, what they do not believe in".

== Filmography ==
- Jeremiah, film TV, RAI 1, 1998
- Jesus, television film (co-producer), Emmy Award Nomination Outstanding miniseries 2000
- Paul the Apostle, television film, Lux Vide production, 2000
- Joseph of Nazareth, television film, Lux Vide production, originally aired on Mediaset, 2000
- Mary Magdalene, television film, Lux Vide production, originally aired on Mediaset, 2000
- Giuda, television film, Lux Vide production, originally aired on Mediaset, 2001
- Thomas, television film, Lux Vide production, originally aired on Mediaset, 2001
- The Apocalypse, television film, Lux Vide production, aired on RAI1, 2002
- Imperium: Saint Peter, television film, Lux Vide production, aired on RAI 1, 2005
- Karol: The Pope, The Man, television film, Tao Due production, aired on Mediaset, 2005
- Maria Montessori – Una vita per i bambini, television film, Tao Due production, aired on Mediaset, 2007; "Maximo Award" at the Roma Fiction Fest for best screenplay
- Paul VI: The Pope in the Tempest, television film, Lux Vide production, aired on RAI 1, 2008
- Francesco, television film, aired on RAI 1, 2014

== Bibliography ==
- I miracoli di Gesù. Dramma e rivelazione, Milano: Paoline Editoriale Libri, 2008 ISBN 978-88-315-3269-3
- La parabola della parabola: La narrazione dell'assoluto dai Vangeli a Kafka, Independently Published, 2018 ISBN 978-1980839385
- La quaresima, un percorso di ascesi cristiana: dieci meditazioni sul cammino della Pasqua, Independently Published, 2021 ISBN 979-8721138003
