= Five Mile River Films =

Five Mile River Films is an American-Italian TV film production company founded in 1995 by the Italian producer Lorenzo Minoli, which is best known for historical epics.

The company produced most of the films of the TNT "Bible Collection" films including Abraham (1993) with Richard Harris, Jacob (1994) starring Matthew Modine, Joseph (1995) with Paul Mercurio, Moses (1995), Samson and Delilah (1997), David (1997) starring Nathaniel Parker, Solomon (1997) starring Ben Cross, Jeremiah (1998) and Esther (1998).
