= Paul the Apostle (film) =

2000 Italian television film

- Screenplay by: Gareth Jones
- Story by: Gianmario Pagano
- Directed by: Roger Young
- Starring: Johannes Brandrup; Thomas Lockyer; Barbora Bobuľová; Ennio Fantastichini; G. W. Bailey; Franco Nero
- Composer: Carlo Siliotto
- Original language: English

Production
- Producer: Luca Bernabei
- Cinematography: Giovanni Galasso
- Editor: Alessandro Lucidi

Original release
- Release: 2000

Paul the Apostle (Italian: San Paolo, German: Die Bibel – Paulus), also known as Saint Paul, is a 2000 television film written by Gareth Jones and directed by Roger Young. The film is based on real life events of Christian apostle and Saint Paul.

== Cast ==
- Johannes Brandrup as Paul
- Thomas Lockyer as Ruben
- Barbora Bobuľová as Dina
- Ennio Fantastichini as Peter
- G. W. Bailey as Barnabas
- Franco Nero as Gamaliel
- Giorgio Pasotti as John
- Christian Brendel as James
- Giovanni Lombardo Radice as Herod Antipas
- Jack Hedley as High Priest
- Massimo Sarchielli as Ananias of Damascus
- Faith Brook as Sarah
- Riccardo Sardoné as Stephen
- Daniela Poggi as Mary
- Roger Young as Herod Agrippa
- Umberto Orsini as Tribune
- Maria Cristina Heller as Hagar

== Production ==
The film was shot in Lux Vide studios in Ouarzazate, Morocco. Part of The Bible Collection project, it was directed by Roger Young, who had directed the series' previous chapters Joseph, Moses, Solomon and Jesus.

== Reception ==
Peter T. Chattaway from Christianity Today referred to the film as "one of the weakest entries" in The Bible Collection series, and noted it "dilutes its biblical source material with much more fictitious material than any of the films that came before it". Corriere della Sera's television critic Aldo Grasso described Young's direction as "honest" and "expository".

In Italy, Paul the Apostle was a ratings success, being watched by over 8.7 million viewers upon its premiere.
