= Restless Heart: The Confessions of Saint Augustine =

2010 television miniseries

- Screenplay by: Francesco Arlanch; Sebastian Henckel-Donnersmarck
- Story by: Gianmario Pagano
- Directed by: Christian Duguay
- Starring: Alessandro Preziosi; Monica Guerritore; Alexander Held; Katy Louise Saunders; Dominic Atherton
- Music by: Andrea Guerra
- Countries of origin: Italy; Germany
- Original language: English

Production
- Producers: Luca Bernabei; Matilde Bernabei; Martin Choroba; Franco Coduti; Saverio D'Ercole; Franz Esterhazy; Chris Grabowski; Krzysztof Grabowski; Golli Marboe; Vincenzo Mosca; Daniele Passani
- Cinematography: Fabrizio Lucci
- Editors: Lorenzo Fanfani; Alessandro Lucidi
- Running time: 205 minutes

Original release
- Release: 31 January 2010

Restless Heart: The Confessions of Saint Augustine (distributed in the U.S. as: Augustine: The Decline of the Roman Empire, Italian: Sant'Agostino) is a 2010 two-part television miniseries chronicling the life of St. Augustine, the early Christian theologian, writer and Bishop of Hippo Regius at the time of the Vandal invasion (AD 430).

This series was directed by Christian Duguay and was shot on location in Tunisia.

== Plot ==
In 430 AD, in the besieged city of Hippo, the seventy-year-old bishop Augustine tells Jovinus, a captain of the Roman guards, the story of how his Christian mother, Monica, saved him. Born in the North African city of Thagaste, Augustine studied in Thagaste, Madauros and Carthage, becoming an accomplished but dissolute orator. After converting to Manichaeism, a guiltfree religion, he was called to the imperial court in Milan to serve as an opponent to the Christian bishop Ambrose. But when the Empress Justina sends imperial guards to clear out a basilica where Augustine's own mother is worshipping, he is won over to Christianity. Back in Hippo, Augustine urges the Roman garrison to negotiate with the Vandal king Genseric, but they proudly refuse. At that point, he too, passing up a chance to escape on a ship sent to rescue him by the Pope, stays by the side of his people.

== Cast ==
- Alessandro Preziosi as Augustine
- Franco Nero as Augustine in old age
- Monica Guerritore as Monica
- Johannes Brandrup as Valerius
- Alexander Held as Valerius in old age
- Katy Louise Saunders as Lucilla
- Sebastian Ströbel as Fabius
- Serena Rossi as Khalidà
- Götz Otto as Genseric, king of the Vandals
- Andrea Giordana as Ambrose
- Cesare Bocci as Romaniano
- Francesca Cavallin as the Empress mother Iustina
- Dominic Atherton as the child Emperor Valentinian II
- Eve Karpf as Monica
- Sonia Aquino as Blesilla

== See also ==
- Bible Collection
- List of historical drama films
- List of films set in ancient Rome
