= Johannes Brandrup =

German actor (born 1967)

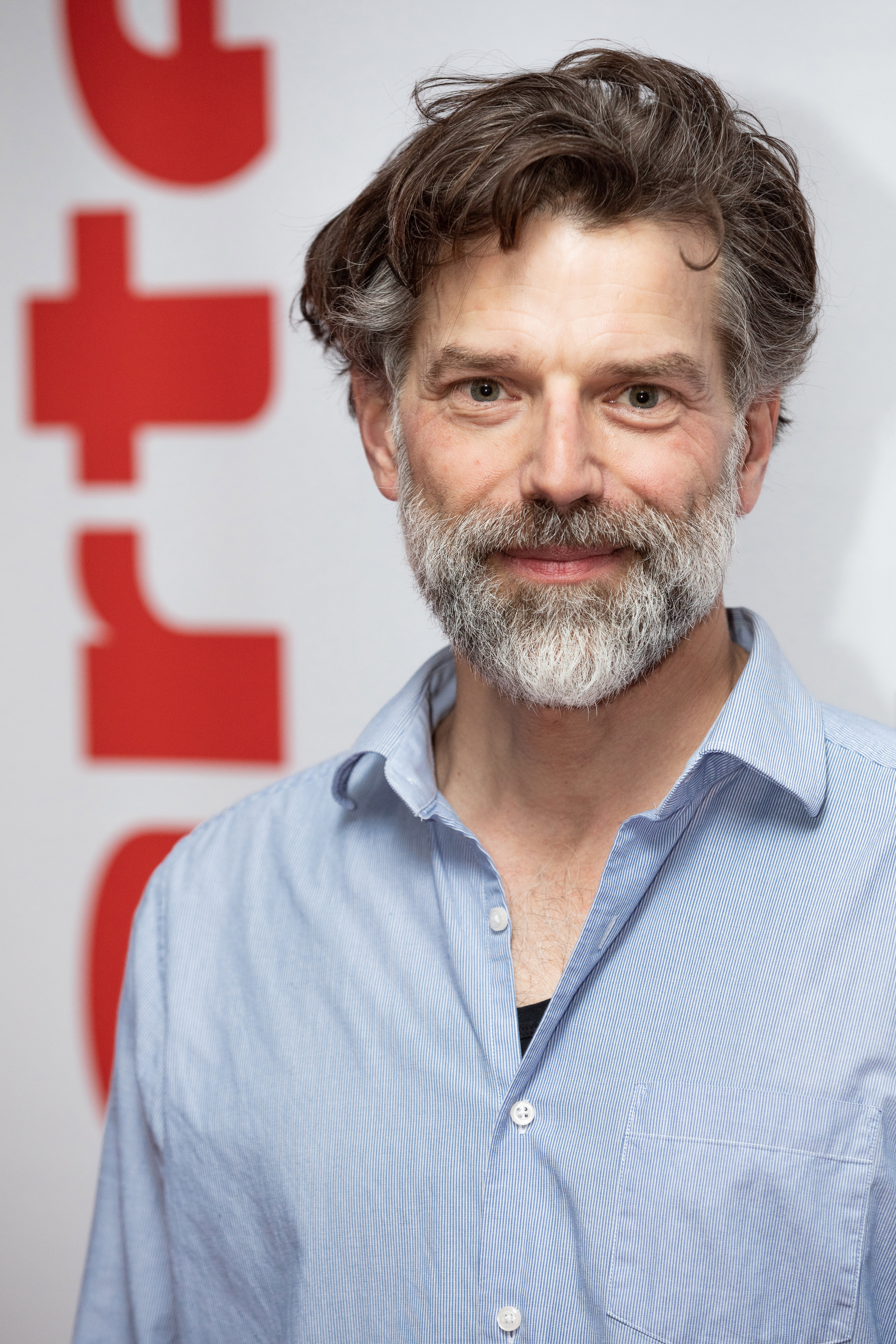
- Brandrup in 2020
- Born: Johannes Brandrup; 7 January 1967 (age 59); Frankfurt, West Germany
- Occupation: Actor
- Years active: 1993–present

Johannes Brandrup (born 7 January 1967) is a German actor.

Born in Frankfurt, Brandrup was the first detective in the action television series Alarm für Cobra 11 – Die Autobahnpolizei. After the first season, he moved on to other projects, but briefly returned for its 40th season.

== Selected filmography ==
=== TV ===
- Alarm für Cobra 11 – Die Autobahnpolizei (1996, 2016)
- Paul the Apostle (2000)
- The Crusaders (2001)
- Imperium: Saint Peter (2005)
- Mafalda di Savoia: Il coraggio di una principessa (2006) as Philipp, Landgrave of Hesse
- Day of Disaster (2007)
- Augustine: The Decline of the Roman Empire (2010)
- Mary of Nazareth (2012)

=== Film ===
- Paul the Apostle (2005)
- 80 Minutes (2008)
