= The Siege at Ruby Ridge =

1996 television miniseries

- Genre: Drama film
- Written by: Lionel Chetwynd
- Directed by: Roger Young
- Starring: Laura Dern; Randy Quaid; Kirsten Dunst; Darren Burrows; G. W. Bailey; Bradley Pierce; Gary Graham; August Schellenberg; Frederick Coffin; Robert Harper; Lyman Ward; Bob Gunton; Joe Don Baker; Diane Ladd
- Theme music composer: Patrick Williams
- Country of origin: United States
- Original language: English

Production
- Executive producers: Edgar J. Scherick; Judith Regan
- Producer: Robert F. Phillips
- Production locations: Chico, California; Magalia, California
- Cinematography: Donald M. Morgan
- Editors: Dennis C. Vejar; Benjamin A. Weissman
- Running time: 175 minutes
- Production companies: Edgar J. Scherick Associates; The Regan Company; Victor Television Productions Inc.

Original release
- Network: CBS
- Release: May 19, 1996

The Siege at Ruby Ridge is a 1996 drama television film directed by Roger Young and written by Lionel Chetwynd about the confrontation between the family of Randy Weaver and the US federal government at Ruby Ridge in 1992. It was based on the book Every Knee Shall Bow by reporter Jess Walter. It originally aired as a two-part CBS miniseries titled Ruby Ridge: An American Tragedy on May 19 and May 21, 1996. The miniseries was edited together to become the film The Siege at Ruby Ridge.

== Plot ==
Based on the events of the Ruby Ridge standoff, the film follows Randy and Vicki Weaver who begin as stereotypical Iowa citizens, religious, friendly, and with strong family ties, who begin to adopt apocalyptic views. They move to Idaho as they become convinced of a "Zionist One World Conspiracy" and become involved with Aryan Nations. Randy becomes entangled in gun trafficking which leads to a siege of Weaver's property by overzealous federal agents in which Sammy and Vicki are killed.

== Cast ==
- Laura Dern as Vicki Weaver
- Randy Quaid as Randy Weaver
- Kirsten Dunst as Sara Weaver
- Darren E. Burrows as Kevin Harris
- G. W. Bailey as Ralph Coulter
- Bradley Pierce as Sammy Weaver
- Gary Graham as Brian Jackson
- August Schellenberg as Indian
- Diane Ladd as Irma Coulter
- Tracy Griffith as Gwen Coulter
- Nicholas Pryor as Bert Yeager
- Hal Landon Jr. as George Mill
- John Dennis Johnston as Tony Vickers
- Robert Harper as Earl Martens
- Lyman Ward as Ross Jones
- Bob Gunton as Bo Gritz
- Joe Don Baker as Gerry Spence

== Awards ==
Year	Group	Award	Nominee	Result
1996	Satellite Award	Best Miniseries or TV Film	The Siege at Ruby Ridge	Nominated
1996	Satellite Award	Best Actress – Miniseries or Television Film	Laura Dern	Nominated
1997	YoungStar Award	Best Young Actress in a Mini-Series/Made for TV Film	Kirsten Dunst	Won
