= Kiss the Sky (film) =

- Directed by: Roger Young
- Written by: Eric Lerner
- Produced by: Eric Lerner
- Starring: William Petersen; Gary Cole; Sheryl Lee; Terence Stamp
- Cinematography: Donald M. Morgan
- Edited by: Benjamin A. Weissman
- Music by: Patrick Williams
- Production company: Metro-Goldwyn-Mayer Pictures
- Distributed by: MGM Distribution Co.
- Release date: October 9, 1999
- Running time: 105 minutes
- Country: United States
- Language: English

Kiss the Sky is a 1998 drama film directed by Roger Young. The plot follows two men in their forties and friends since college who take a business trip to the Philippines. There they examine their lives and consider trading their adult responsibilities for a return to the hedonism of their youth. The film was shot in the locations of Manila, Taal Lake, and Batangas.

== Plot ==
Jeff and Marty are two friends and businessmen facing a midlife crisis. Jeff is married to Franny and has two daughters, while Marty is married to Beth. Both men feel something is missing in their marriages. The men decide to travel to the Philippines, where they embark on a drug and alcohol-fueled bender and meet a woman named Andy, with whom both men fall in love. They have a threesome and decide to leave their families to live together. Andy introduces them to Kozen, a Zen Buddhist monk, and they decide to build a refuge on an isolated beach. After a period together, Jeff misses his family and the relationship of the group deteriorates when Andy falls in love with Jeff.

== Cast ==
- William Petersen as Jeff
- Gary Cole as Marty
- Sheryl Lee as Andy
- Patricia Charbonneau as Franny
- Season Hubley as Beth
- Terence Stamp as Kozen
- Ivana Miličević as Ilsa

== Reception ==
Nathan Rabin of The A.V. Club called the film "Little more than The Beach for the mortgage-and-carpool crowd," and said it "starts strong only to become an escapist fantasy for overaged Maxim readers." Rabin noted the threesome scene between the three leads is "an excruciating [one] that suggests a Playboy video recast with veteran character actors. The movie never really recovers, as the quest for spiritual salvation mutates into an extremely ordinary battle of the sexes."
