= Patrick Williams (composer) =

American composer, arranger, and conductor (1939–2018)

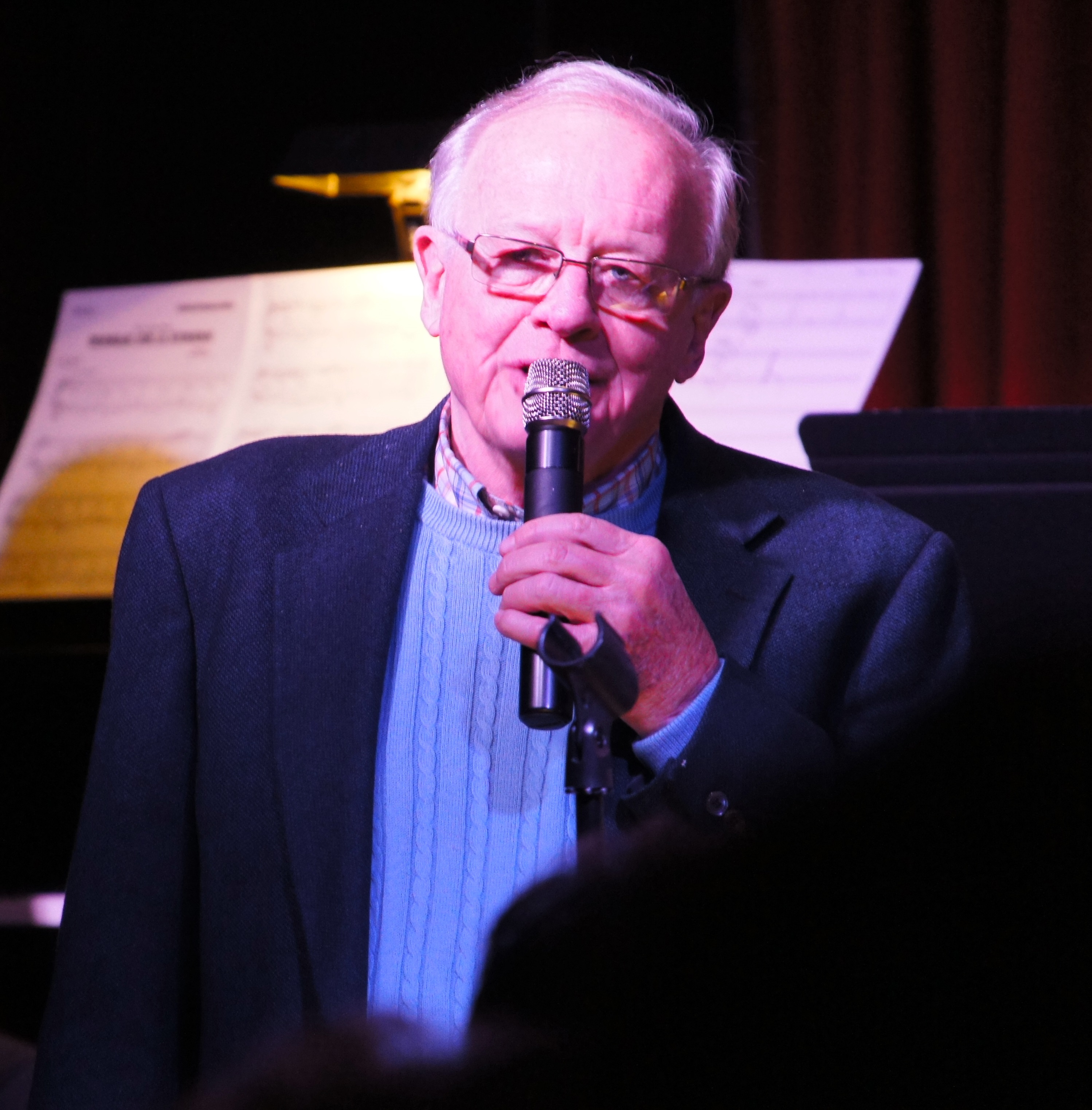
- Williams at Catalina Jazz Club in Hollywood (2014)

Background information
- Born: Patrick Moody Williams; April 23, 1939; Bonne Terre, Missouri, U.S.
- Died: July 25, 2018 (aged 79) Santa Monica, California, U.S.
- Genres: Film score, easy listening, big band
- Occupations: Composer, arranger, conductor
- Instrument: Trumpet
- Years active: 1960s–2018
- Website: patrickwilliamsmusic.com

Patrick Moody Williams (April 23, 1939 – July 25, 2018) was an American composer, arranger, and conductor who worked in many genres of music, and in film and television.

== Education ==
Williams was born in Bonne Terre, Missouri. At age 10, his family moved to Connecticut. He graduated from Darien High School in 1957, where he was taught classical trumpet and led his own swing-oriented jazz band. Williams earned a degree in history at Duke University in 1961. From 1959 to 1961, Williams performed with the student-run jazz big band, the Duke Ambassadors, and served as the band's leader the latter two years. After graduation, Williams moved to New York City, where, in post-graduate work at Columbia University, he studied music composition and conducting.

== Early career ==
In New York City, Williams began work in conducting and arranging. In 1964 he arranged the jazz tracks for trumpeter Clark Terry’s What Makes Sammy Swing! He was musical director of the 1966 comedy album When You're In Love The Whole World is Jewish. In addition, Williams found lucrative employment writing music for advertising jingles.

In 1967, Williams was hired as music director for an NBC Television Network program titled "A Funny Thing Happened on The Way To Hollywood", hosted by Jack Paar. Independent record executive Pete Spargo produced three LPs for Williams in 1968 and 1969, released on the Verve label, featuring a "mod brass" band that included trombonist Bill Watrous, trumpeter Marvin Stamm, and percussionist Bill LaVorgna. "Pat Williams and his Shades of Today Orchestra" (named after the title of his first Verve recording) backed the 11th annual Grammy Awards ceremonies in New York City in March 1969.

== Film and television ==
Inspired by the work of Henry Mancini, Williams moved to California to try his luck writing music for motion pictures. Mancini helped Williams get one of his earliest assignments, for the 1968 comedy "How Sweet It Is!", which starred James Garner and Debbie Reynolds. Williams kept a hand in commercial composition; in May 1969 he created musical station breaks and material for Radio Station KSFO in San Francisco. In early television work, Williams was the music director for the Fall 1969 ABC Television Network weekly program, "The Music Scene", and composed, arranged, and conducted its theme music.

Williams composed themes for the television series Lou Grant, The Bob Newhart Show, The Streets of San Francisco, and The Days and Nights of Molly Dodd, and composed music for Columbo, The Mary Tyler Moore Show, and more than 100 TV-movies and miniseries. Among the latter were " Decoration Day," " Geronimo" and "Kingfish: A Story of Huey P. Long", and miniseries "Jewels," "Jesus," and "Blonde." Williams’ jazz-funk arrangement of the Beatles' "Get Back", from his Verve album Heavy Vibrations, was used as the longtime theme for the 1970s sports quiz show Sports Challenge, emceed by Dick Enberg.

Over a period of nearly 40 years, Williams scored more than 65 feature films, including All of Me; Swing Shift; Cuba; The Grass Harp; and Breaking Away, for which he received a 1980 Oscar nomination. In 2009, Williams was a music arranger for the 81st Annual Academy Awards.

== Recordings ==
Williams composed, produced, and conducted the album Threshold for Capitol Records in 1973. The following year it was awarded a Grammy for Best Instrumental Arrangement.

In addition to Threshold, several of Williams' other recordings are also considered contemporary big-band standards, including Dreams and Themes (its track Too Hip for the Room was a Grammy nominee in 1983); Tenth Avenue—a double Grammy nominee in 1987; and Sinatraland, a tribute to the singer which was Grammy-nominated in 1998. Into the 21st century, Williams' Aurora (2010) and his Home Suite Home (2015) earned a combined three additional Grammy nominations.

== Compositions ==
In contrast to his film and television work and pop recordings, Williams composed and conducted many works regarded as symphonic. An American Concerto, composed in 1976, was one of the first successful attempts to combine jazz elements with traditional symphonic writing. In addition to An American Concerto his compositions include Romances, Adagio, and August, as well as Suite Memories for trombone and symphony orchestra, which won a 1986 Grammy; Spring Wings, a double concerto for piano and saxophone and symphony orchestra; Appalachian Morning, recorded by the Boston Pops; Memento Mei for solo soprano and orchestra; and The Prayer of St. Francis for flute and strings.

Williams spent eight months composing the 1986 orchestral work Gulliver, which was recorded by London's Royal Philharmonic Orchestra, with narration written by Larry Gelbart (based on Jonathan Swift's writings), read by John Gielgud. For the concert premiere, Williams conducted the Yale Philharmonic with Tony Randall narrating.

For clarinetist Eddie Daniels, Williams wrote A Concerto in Swing; for saxophonist Tom Scott, he penned Romances for Jazz Soloist and Orchestra. His Theme For Earth Day was recorded by John Williams and the Boston Pops.

== Music education ==
Williams was prominent in the music-education field. For five years he served as the artistic director of the Henry Mancini Institute, one of the nation's premier training programs for young musicians seeking professional careers in music. Williams was Visiting Professor and Composer-in-Residence at the University of Utah and the University of Colorado, which awarded him an honorary doctorate. He also held an honorary doctorate from his alma mater Duke University and performed and/or lectured at such other institutions as the Berklee College of Music, Indiana University, Texas Christian University, UCLA, USC, and Yale University.

== Collaborations ==
In 1992, Frank Sinatra approached Williams about conducting, producing and arranging the Duets albums. Williams agreed, and went on to conduct and re-arrange both Duets and Duets II in 1994. Williams often referred to this as one of the fondest accomplishments of his entire career. This was not the first time Williams had worked with Sinatra, however. In the 1980s the two had worked together on concert arrangements. Williams recalled writing an uptempo version of "September in the Rain."

In 2016, Deana Martin, daughter of Dean Martin, recorded a new swing album, which Williams scored and conducted. He also wrote five songs featured in the album: "52nd & Broadway," co-written with Gail Kantor; "I've Been Around," "Hearing Ella Sing,” and “Good Things Grow,” co-written with Arthur Hamilton; and “I Know What You Are” co-written with Will Jennings. The album Swing Street was released in 2016.

Williams was contracted frequently by the major labels; however, he always managed to find time to share his talents with up-and-comers he believed in. In 2013, Williams produced and arranged two singles for 23 year-old vocalist James DeFrances. The premise was Big Band, swing covers of current pop songs, similar to what Williams had done for Paul Anka on the latter's 2005 Rock Swings album. DeFrances and Williams subsequently created their covers of "Call Me Maybe" and "Suit & Tie". These sessions marked a reunion of the Sinatra Duets orchestra and production staff at Capitol Records for the first time since 1994. Al Schmitt engineered the sessions and, to add to the nostalgia, he set up a Neumann U47 microphone previously owned by Sinatra himself. Williams' daughter Greer acted as creative director for this project.

== Awards and honors ==
Nominated for the Pulitzer Prize for composing the orchestral work An American Concerto, Williams won two Grammys for his jazz arrangements, four Emmys for his television music, an Oscar nomination for film composition, and the Richard Kirk Award from BMI. Williams was nominated for a total of 21 Grammys (recordings) and 22 Emmys (television).

== Death ==
Williams died of cancer in Santa Monica, California, on July 25, 2018, at age 79.

== Reception ==
Respected music critic Gene Lees was quoted as saying: "His An American Concerto is, in my opinion, the best mixture of jazz and classical that anybody has ever done. Pat's writing is breathtaking. He's just one of the finest arrangers and composers who ever put pen to paper."

Daniel Cariaga wrote in the Los Angeles Times: " An American Concerto must be one of the most attractive, affecting and original of jazz-symphonic meldings. The style is unrestrained, the tunes ingratiating, the writing expert. What Williams owes to the fair influences of Debussy, Bartok, Stravinsky and Rachmaninoff seems no more and no less than other living composers may owe in those directions. What sets him a cut above others is the individual integration he has achieved out of those influences."

== Feature film credits ==
- Passion's Way (1999): Sela Ward, Timothy Dalton, Alicia Witt; Robert Allan Ackerman, Dir.
- Kiss the Sky (1998), MGM: William Petersen, Gary Cole, Sheryl Lee; Roger Young, Dir.
- Julian Po (1997), New Line Cinema: Christian Slater, Robin Tunney; Alan Wade, Dir.
- That Old Feeling (1997), Universal: Bette Midler, Dennis Farina; Carl Reiner, Dir.
- Stormchasers (1995): Greg MacGillivray, Dir.
- The Grass Harp (1995), New Line Cinema: Walter Matthau, Piper Laurie, Sissy Spacek; Charles Matthau, Dir.
- Big Girls Don't Cry... They Get Even (1992), New Line Cinema: Hillary Wolf, Ben Savage; Joan Micklin Silver, Dir.
- The Cutting Edge (1992), MGM: D.B. Sweeney, Moira Kelly; Paul Glaser, Dir.
- Cry-Baby (1990), Universal: Johnny Depp, Ricki Lake, Polly Bergen; John Waters, Dir.
- In the Spirit (1990), Marlo Thomas, Elaine May; Sandra Seacat, Dir.
- Worth Winning (1989), 20th Century Fox: Mark Harmon, Madeleine Stowe, Lesley Ann Warren; Will Mackenzie, Dir.
- Fresh Horses (1988), Columbia: Molly Ringwald, Andrew McCarthy; David Anspaugh, Dir.
- Just Between Friends (1986), Orion: Mary Tyler Moore, Ted Danson, Christine Lahti; Allan Burns, Dir.
- Violets Are Blue (1986), Columbia: Kevin Kline, Sissy Spacek; Jack Fisk, Dir.
- The Slugger's Wife (1985), Columbia: Michael O'Keefe, Rebecca De Mornay; Hal Ashby, Dir.
- All of Me (1984), Universal: Steve Martin, Lily Tomlin; Carl Reiner, Dir.
- Best Defense (1984), Paramount: Dudley Moore, Kate Capshaw, Eddie Murphy; Willard Huyck, Dir.
- The Buddy System (1984), 20th Century Fox: Richard Dreyfuss, Susan Sarandon, Wil Wheaton; Glenn Jordon, Dir.
- Swing Shift (1984), Warner Bros.: Goldie Hawn, Kurt Russell, Ed Harris; Jonathon Demme, Dir.
- Marvin and Tige (1983), 20th Century Fox Classics: John Cassavetes, Billy Dee Williams; Eric Weston, Dir.
- The Toy (1982), Columbia: Richard Pryor, Jackie Gleason; Richard Donner, Dir.
- The Best Little Whorehouse in Texas (1982), Universal: Dolly Parton, Burt Reynolds; Colin Higgins, Dir.
- Some Kind of Hero (1982), Paramount: Richard Pryor, Margot Kidder; Michael Pressman, Dir.
- Charlie Chan and the Curse of the Dragon Queen (1981), Peter Ustinov, Lee Grant, Angie Dickinson; Clive Donner, Dir.
- How to Beat the High Co$t of Living (1980), Jessica Lange, Susan Saint James, Jane Curtin; Robert Scheer, Dir.
- It's My Turn (1980), Columbia: Jill Clayburgh, Michael Douglas; Claudia Weill, Dir.
- Used Cars (1980), Columbia: Kurt Russell, Jack Warden; Robert Zemeckis, Dir.
- Wholly Moses (1980), Columbia: Dudley Moore, Richard Pryor, John Ritter; Gary Weis, Dir.
- Hero at Large (1980), MGM: John Ritter, Anne Archer; Martin Davidson, Dir.
- Breaking Away (music adaptor, 1979), 20th Century Fox: Dennis Christopher, Dennis Quaid, Daniel Stern; Peter Yates, Dir.
- Butch and Sundance: The Early Days (1979), 20th Century Fox: Tom Berenger, William Katt; Richard Lester, Dir.
- Cuba (1979), United Artists: Sean Connery, Brooke Adams; Richard Lester, Dir.
- Hot Stuff (1979), Columbia: Dom DeLuise, Jerry Reed, Suzanne Pleshette; Dom DeLuise, Dir.
- The Seniors (1978): Gary Imhoff, Jeffrey Byron, Dennis Quaid; Rodney Amateau, Dir.
- Casey's Shadow (1978), Columbia: Walter Matthau; Martin Ritt, Dir.
- The One and Only (1978), Paramount: Henry Winkler, Kim Darby; Carl Reiner, Dir.
- The Cheap Detective (1978), Columbia: Peter Falk, Ann-Margret, Madeline Kahn; Robert Moore, Dir.
- I Wonder Who's Killing Her Now? (1975): Bob Dishy, Joanna Barnes; Steven Hillard Stern, Dir.
- Framed (1975), Paramount: Joe Don Baker, Conny Van Dyke; Phil Karlson, Dir.
- Moonchild (1974): John Carradine, Victor Buono, Pat Renella; Alan Gadney, Dir.
- Hex (1973), 20th Century Fox: Keith Carradine, Tina Herazo, Hillarie Thompson; Leo Garen, Dir.
- Sssssss (1973), Universal: Dirk Benedict, Strother Martin; Bernard L. Kowalski, Dir.
- Hardcase (1972), Hanna-Barbera Productions, TV Movie: Clint Walker, Dir John Llewellyn Moxey
- Evel Knievel (1971), Paramount: George Hamilton; Marvin J. Chomsky, Dir.
- Macho Callahan (1970), Avco Embassy: David Janssen, Jean Seberg, Lee J. Cobb; Bernard L. Kowalski, Dir.
- Don't Drink the Water (1969), Avco Embassy: Jackie Gleason, Estelle Parsons; Howard Morris, Dir.
- A Nice Girl Like Me (1969), Avco Embassy: Barbara Ferris, Harry Andrews; Desmond Davis, Dir.
- How Sweet It Is! (1968), National General Pictures: James Garner, Debbie Reynolds; Jerry Paris, Dir.

== Television film and miniseries credits ==
- The Perfect Husband: The Laci Peterson Story (2004), Dean Cain, Sarah Joy Brown
- When Angels Come To Town (2004), Tammy Blanchard, Peter Falk
- James Patterson's 1st to Die (2003), Tracy Pollan, Gil Bellows
- Finding John Christmas (2003), Valerie Bertinelli, Peter Falk
- Power and Beauty (2002), Natasha Henstridge, Kevin Anderson
- We Were the Mulvaneys (2002), Blythe Danner, Beau Bridges
- Inside the Osmonds (2001), Bruce McGill, Veronica Cartwright
- Just Ask My Children (2001), Virginia Madsen, Jeffrey Nordling
- Blonde (2001), Poppy Montgomery, Kirstie Alley, Ann-Margret
- Yesterday's Children (2000), Jane Seymour, Hume Cronyn
- The Thin Blue Lie (2000) Rob Morrow, Randy Quaid, Paul Sorvino
- The Three Stooges (2000) Michael Chiklis, Paul Ben-Victor
- Jesus (1999), Jeremy Sisto, Jacqueline Bisset, Gary Oldman
- Miracle on the 17th Green (1999), Robert Urich, Meredith Baxter
- Shake, Rattle and Roll: An American Love Story (1999), Dana Delany, James Coburn, Kathy Baker
- A Song From the Heart (1999) Amy Grant, D.W. Moffatt, Keith Carradine
- A Cooler Climate (1999), Sally Field, Judy Davis
- Take My Advice: The Ann and Abby Story (1999), Wendi Malick
- Too Rich: The Secret Life of Doris Duke (1999), Lauren Bacall, Richard Chamberlain
- Passion's Way (1999), Sela Ward, Timothy Dalton
- A Knight in Camelot (1998), Whoopi Goldberg, Michael York
- Solomon (1997), Ben Cross, Max von Sydow
- Heart Full of Rain (1997), Richard Crenna, Rick Schroder
- After Jimmy (1997), Meredith Baxter, Bruce Davison
- Never Give Up: The Jimmy V Story (1996,) Anthony LaPaglia, Ronny Cox
- Ruby Ridge: An American Tragedy (1996), Laura Dern, Randy Quaid
- A Brother's Promise: The Dan Jansen Story (1996), Matt Keeslar, Jayne Brooke
- Journey (1995), Jason Robards, Meg Tilly, Brenda Fricker
- Tom Clancy's OP Center (1995), Harry Hamlin
- Saved by the Light (1995), Eric Roberts
- The West Side Waltz (1995), Liza Minnelli, Shirley MacLaine
- Deadline For Murder: From the Files of Edna Buchanan (1995), Meredith Baxter
- Kingfish: A Story of Huey P. Long (1995), John Goodman, Anne Heche
- Her Hidden Truth (1995), Kellie Martin, Antonio Sabato Jr.
- Hercules (1995), Paul Telfer, Elizabeth Perkins
- Take Me Home Again (1994), Kirk Douglas, Craig T. Nelson
- Because Mommy Works (1994), Anne Archer, John Heard
- Getting Gotti (1994), Lorraine Bracco, Anthony John Denison
- The Corpse Had A Familiar Face (1994), Elizabeth Montgomery, Dennis Farina
- Accidental Meeting (1994), Linda Gray, Linda Purl
- French Silk (1994), Susan Lucci, Lee Horsley
- Mercy Mission: The Rescue of Flight 771 (1993), Robert Loggia, Scott Bakula
- Geronimo (1993), Joseph Runningfox
- Zelda (1993), Natasha Richardson, Timothy Hutton
- Murder in the Heartland (1993), Tim Roth, Fairuza Balk
- Blind Spot (1993), Joanne Woodward, Laura Linney
- Jewels (1992), Annette O'Toole, Anthony Andrews
- The Gift of Love (1991), Andy Griffith, Blair Brown
- In Broad Daylight (1991), Brian Dennehy, Marcia Gay Harden
- Decoration Day (1990), James Garner, Judith Ivey, Laurence Fishburne
- The Lives of Jenny Dolan (1975), Shirley Jones, Stephen Boyd; Jerry Jameson, Dir.
- Terror in the Sky (1971), Doug McClure, Roddy McDowall; Bernard L. Kowalski, Dir.
- The Failing of Raymond (1971), Jane Wyman, Dean Stockwell; Boris Sagal, Dir.

== Television series credits ==
This is a partial list.

- Monk
- Extreme
- Black Tie Affair
- Baltimore
- Cutters
- The Days and Nights of Molly Dodd (theme and episode scores)
- The Simpsons: "Simpson and Delilah"
- The Slap Maxwell Story
- FM
- AfterMASH
- Columbo
- Lou Grant
- The Streets of San Francisco (theme and 11 scores)
- The Bob Newhart Show
- The Mary Tyler Moore Show
- The Tony Randall Show
- The Magician
- The Music Scene

== Selected discography ==
- Shades of Today (as Pat Williams) (Verve 1968)
- Think (as The Pat Williams Band) (Verve 1968)
- Heavy Vibrations (as Pat Williams) (Verve 1969)
- Threshold (Capitol 1974)
- Feeling Free (with The Singers Unlimited / The Pat Williams Orchestra) (MPS 1975)
- Come On And Shine (MPS 1978), reissued as Theme (PAUSA 1980)
- An American Concerto (as Patrick Williams and the London Symphony Orchestra) (Columbia 1980)
- Dreams and Themes (Allegiance 1983)
- 10th Avenue (as Patrick Williams’ New York Band) (Soundwings 1987)
- Sinatraland (as Patrick Williams and his big band) (EMI-Capitol 1998)
- Breath of Heaven (Vince Gill with Patrick Williams and his Orchestra) (MCA Records 1998)
- Aurora (as Patrick Williams, The Big Band) (ArtistShare 2010)
- Moments in Time (as Patrick Williams and Symphony Orchestra) (Soundwings 2013)
- Home Suite Home (BFM Jazz 2015)
