= Enrico Sabbatini =

Enrico Sabbatini (January 1, 1932 – November 25, 1998) was an Italian costume designer and production designer for the theater and cinema industries.

Sabbatini was born in Spoleto, in the province of Umbria. His creations were usually very lavish and detailed, made for epoch movies. In 1986, he won the award for best costume design by the British Academy, as well as a nomination for the Oscar for his work in The Mission. He also produced Seven Years in Tibet (1997), Cutthroat Island (1995), Chronicle of a Death Foretold (1987), Bloodline (1979), Giordano Bruno (1973), Sacco and Vanzetti (1971), Camille 2000, The Lickerish Quartet, the Marco Polo TV miniseries, and many others. Specifically, he was costume designer and production designer for a large series of biblical-inspired TV series in the TNT network, such as Moses, Joseph, Jesus of Nazareth, Jacob, Abraham, David, Genesis and Samson and Delilah, as well as, in his last work just before he died, in the TV series Cleopatra.

He died in a road accident in Ouarzazate, Morocco, while filming on location for Cleopatra.

As it appears in the credits, Jesus, a 1999 film distributed by CBS Television, was dedicated in his memory.
