= Imperium: Saint Peter =

- Directed by: Giulio Base
- Written by: Francesco Arlanch; Salvatore Basile; Gianmario Pagano
- Starring: Omar Sharif
- Cinematography: Giovanni Galasso
- Edited by: Alessandro Lucidi
- Music by: Marco Frisina
- Release date: 2005
- Country: Italy

Imperium: Saint Peter is a 2005 Italian television-film about the life and work of Saint Peter. The film stars Omar Sharif as Peter, and was originally released as San Pietro.

== Cast ==
- Omar Sharif as Saint Peter
- Johannes Brandrup as Jesus
- Daniele Pecci as Paul the Apostle
- Flavio Insinna as David
- Lina Sastri as Mary
- Philippe Leroy as Gamaliel
- Milena Miconi as Mary Magdalene
- Fabrizio Bucci as John
- Manrico Gammarota as Andrew
- Marco Vivio as Stephen
- Marco Leonardi as Mark
- Bianca Guaccero as Silvia

Costumes by: Stefano De Nardis

== See also ==
- List of historical drama films
