= Jeremiah (film) =

- DVD cover
- Written by: Harry Winer
- Directed by: Harry Winer
- Starring: Patrick Dempsey; Oliver Reed; Klaus Maria Brandauer; Vincent Regan
- Music by: Bruce Broughton
- Country of origin: United States
- Original language: English

Production
- Producers: Matilde Bernabei; Luca Bernabei
- Cinematography: Raffaele Mertes
- Editor: David A. Simmons
- Running time: 90 minutes
- Production companies: Five Mile River Films; Lux Vide

Original release
- Network: RAI
- Release: December 14, 1998

Jeremiah is a 1998 American made-for-television biblical epic drama film produced for RAI and starring Patrick Dempsey as the Biblical prophet Jeremiah. The film originally aired on RAI network on December 14, 1998 (Italy) and PAX TV on August 27, 2000 (United States). It is also part of TNT's Bible Collection series.

== Plot ==
The film depicts Jeremiah's journey as a young man chosen by God to deliver a message of repentance to the people of the Kingdom of Judah. Despite facing persecution and rejection from Judean laymen and leaders, Jeremiah remains faithful to his mission, warning of impending disaster if the people do not turn away from their wickedness.

As Jeremiah's message becomes increasingly unpopular, he faces opposition from powerful political figures and false prophets who seek to silence him. The film portrays the challenges and hardships that Jeremiah endures as he seeks to remain faithful to God's call, even in the face of great danger and opposition.

Throughout the film, Jeremiah's faith and courage inspire others to join him in his mission, and his prophetic warnings ultimately prove to be true as Judah falls to the Babylonian Empire. Despite the tragedy that befalls his people, Jeremiah remains steadfast in his faith and trust in God. The film explores themes of faith, obedience, and perseverance in the face of adversity, and highlights the importance of speaking truth to power, even when it is unpopular or dangerous to do so.

== Cast ==
- Patrick Dempsey as Jeremiah
- Oliver Reed as General Safan
- Klaus Maria Brandauer as King Nebuchadnezzar
- Vincent Regan as King Zedekiah
- Leonor Varela as Judith
- Andrea Occhipinti as King Joiakim
- Michael Cronin as Chelkia
- Stuart Bunce as Baruch ben Neriah
- Roger May as Elshuma
- Simon Kunz as Gemariah
- Silas Carson as Hananiah
- Damian Myerscough as Ephraim
- Chris Pavlo as Hanamel
- Luke Sheppard as Child Jeremiah
