= Ettore Bernabei =

Italian television director and producer

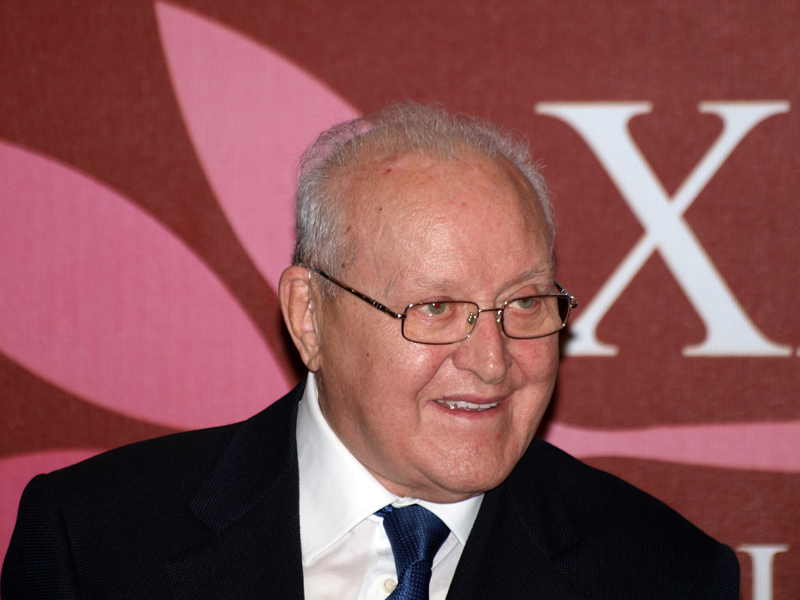
- Born: 16 May 1921; Florence, Italy
- Died: 13 August 2016 (aged 95); Monte Argentario, Italy
- Occupations: Journalist, television producer

Ettore Bernabei (16 May 1921 – 13 August 2016) was an Italian television director and producer.

== Biography ==
=== Early career ===
Ettore Bernabei was born in Florence. An ardent supporter of the newly-born and anti-fascist Christian Democracy Party during World War II, he started his career as editor in chief of Giornale del Mattino, a Florentine newspaper with Christian Democratic ties. From 1956 to 1960, he was nominated editor in chief of the Christian Democratic national newspaper Il Popolo. During this time Bernabei became a close friend and associate of future five-time prime minister Christian Democrat Amintore Fanfani.

=== Career with RAI ===
In 1961, Fanfani appointed Bernabei as Director General of RAI – Radiotelevisione italiana, a post he held until 1974. His appointment coincided with an Italian Constitutional Court decision that renewed RAI's television broadcasting monopoly. During his tenure, Bernabei furthered the tight grasp that the Christian Democratic party held over the broadcaster. His aim was to entertain and educate all viewers, while creating larger public support for the Christian Democracy party.

Opponents challenged Bernabei and RAI about their being too intertwined with the governing party. In order to create a seemingly more balanced RAI and to appease his opponents, Bernabei began the practice of hiring journalists with ties to other parties. This turned out to be a merely symbolic gesture, as he proceeded to largely ignore the ideas of these new employees and stuck to his own agenda. Although Bernabei's strategy greatly increased the operational size of RAI, it ultimately backfired for alienating a big part of the country political spectrum as well as splitting Christian Democrats into competing groups. By the time Bernabei left in 1974, RAI badly needed to be reformed. Despite all this, Bernabei's leadership is often rated for pedagogical principles that before his time had been missing in the Italian television landscape.

=== Post-RAI Career ===
From 1974 to 1991 Bernabei was the managing director and chairman of Italstat. In 1991, with a group of Italian entrepreneurs he started the television production company Lux Vide, which produced series such as The Bible and Jesus. Since February 2007, he has served on the advisory board for T-Systems Italia SpA. He died on 13 August 2016.

=== Awards ===
In 1966, Bernabei was named Cavaliere di Gran Croce by President of the Italian Republic Giuseppe Saragat. IN 2020 Porto Santo Stefano dedicated a square to his name.
