= Jacob (film) =

- Directed by: Peter Hall
- Screenplay by: Lionel Chetwynd
- Based on: Giacobbe by Francesco Maria Nappi
- Produced by: Lorenzo Minoli
- Starring: Matthew Modine; Lara Flynn Boyle; Sean Bean; Giancarlo Giannini
- Cinematography: Ennio Guarnieri
- Edited by: Bill Blunden
- Music by: Marco Frisina and Ennio Morricone
- Distributed by: TNT
- Release date: December 4, 1994 (U.S.A.)
- Running time: 90 minutes

Jacob is a 1994 German/Italian/American television movie directed by Peter Hall starring Matthew Modine, Lara Flynn Boyle, and Sean Bean. It is based on the novel Giacobbe by Francesco Maria Nappi, which is in turn based on a biblical account from the Book of Genesis about Jacob. It is followed by the 1995 miniseries, Joseph, and the 1995 miniseries Moses, both directed by Roger Young and written by Lionel Chetwynd.

== Plot ==
Jacob defrauds his twin brother Esau and flees. In Haran he gets to know his cousin Rachel, and falls in love with her. Years of hard work later he marries Rachel and reconciles with his brother Esau.

== Cast ==
- Matthew Modine – Jacob
- Lara Flynn Boyle – Rachel
- Sean Bean – Esau
- Joss Ackland – Isaac
- Juliet Aubrey – Leah
- Irene Papas – Rebeccah
- Giancarlo Giannini – Laban
- Christoph Waltz – Morash
- Christoph M. Ohrt – Beor
- Philip Locke – Diviner
- Daniel Newman – Reuben
- Cecilia Dazzi – Bilhah
- Yvonne Sció – Judith

== Production ==
Jacob is based on the novel Giacobbe by Francesco Maria Nappi, which is in turn based on a biblical account from the Book of Genesis about Jacob. The screenplay was written by Lionel Chetwynd.

It was directed by British director Peter Hall, whose daughter, Emma, played the child Joseph.

The movie was shot in the Atlas Mountains in Morocco in 1994, by LUBE Productions, LUX, Beta Film, Rai Uno, and Turner Pictures. Cinematography was by Ennio Guarnieri.

Music was by Marco Frisina, with Ennio Morricone as consultant, while Bill Blunden edited the film.

Production design was by Enrico Sabbatini.

It was one of a series of films produced for the TNT television network in the U.S. called the Bible Collection. Gerald Rafshoon was executive producer.

== Release ==
The film premiered at the Banff Theatre in London in December 1994, and was broadcast on television on December 4, 1994.

It was released on DVD by Turner Home Entertainment in 2005.

== Critical reception ==
Reviewer Peter Chattaway wrote that the film "suffers from a pedestrian script and really bad casting", in particular Matthew Modine and Lara Flynn Boyle as lovers.

American filmmaker John P. McCarthy wrote in Variety in 1994: "This sure-footed TNT original has class to spare. Although more spice would be nice, "Jacob" delivers the biblical goods in a modestly compelling package". He praises "Marco Frisina's exceptional score".

Christian website Movieguide reports that the film is "well made, both in cinematography and pacing, keeping the audience's interest effortlessly. The script is realistic, as is most of the plot. The acting is decent but not exceptional".

== See also ==
- Bible Collection
