= David (1997 film) =

- DVD cover
- Directed by: Robert Markowitz
- Written by: Larry Gross (teleplay)
- Produced by: Lorenzo Minoli
- Starring: Nathaniel Parker; Jonathan Pryce; Leonard Nimoy; Sheryl Lee; Ben Daniels
- Cinematography: Raffaele Mertes
- Edited by: David Beatty; Paul Rubell
- Music by: Carlo Siliotto
- Production companies: Five Mile River Films; Beta Film; Lube Productions; Lux Vide; RAI; Turner Pictures
- Distributed by: TNT
- Release dates: 23 March 1997 (Italy); 6 April 1997 (United States)
- Running time: 173 minutes
- Countries: United States; Italy; Germany
- Language: English
- Budget: $15 million

David is a 1997 television film starring Nathaniel Parker as King David. It was written by Larry Gross and directed by Robert Markowitz. Shot entirely in Morocco, it originally aired at TNT on 6 April 1997 as part of its Bible Collection.

== Plot ==
David, a young Israelite shepherd, is chosen by God to help his people in the ongoing war between Israel and the Philistines. David defeats the giant Goliath, a Philistine champion, and becomes the second king of Israel. However, he is later seduced by power and lust, an adaptation of the biblical story.

== Cast ==
- Nathaniel Parker as David
- Jonathan Pryce as Saul
- Leonard Nimoy as Samuel
- Sheryl Lee as Bathsheba
- Ben Daniels as Jonathan
- Richard Ashcroft as Abner
- Maurice Roëves as Joab
- Dominic Rowan as Absalom
- Edward Hall as Amnon
- Clara Bellar as Tamar
- Gina Bellman as Michal
- Franco Nero as Nathan
- Gideon Turner as Young David
- Peter Woodthorpe as Nabal
- John Gielgud as God (uncredited)

== Reception ==
David was nominated for one Primetime Emmy Award in the "Outstanding Sound Editing for a Miniseries or a Special" category. The film was also nominated for two OFTA Television Awards in "Best Miniseries" and "Best New Titles Sequence in a Motion Picture or Miniseries."
