= Mary of Nazareth (film) =

- Written by: Francesco Arlanch; Giacomo Campiotti
- Directed by: Giacomo Campiotti
- Starring: Alissa Jung; Paz Vega; Luca Marinelli; Andreas Pietschmann; Antonia Liskova; Thomas Trabacchi; Roberto Citran; Andrea Giordana
- Composer: Guy Farley
- Original language: Italian

Production
- Cinematography: Enrico Lucidi
- Editor: Alessio Doglione
- Running time: 180 min.

Original release
- Network: Rai 1
- Release: 2012

Mary of Nazareth (Italian: Maria di Nazaret, German: Ihr Name war Maria, Spanish: María de Nazareth) is a 2012 Italian-German-Spanish television movie directed by Giacomo Campiotti. It focuses on life events of Mary of Nazareth, Mother of Jesus, and Mary Magdalene.

== Plot ==
In the late first century BC, a group of marauders raid a Jewish neighborhood and abduct several young girls. A couple, Joachim and Anna, manage to hide their young daughter before the raiders burst into their home and use a dog in an attempt to sniff out any girls they could kidnap. Despite the dog visible to the little girl from her hiding place, it inexplicably fails to notice her scent and the raiders leave the home. Unable to understand how the dog could possibly fail to pick up their daughter, Joachim states that their daughter, Mary, is a mystery. Shortly afterwards, they bring her to the Temple in Jerusalem to live under the care of an elder doctor, Simeon.

Some years later, a young carpenter, Joseph, approaches Mary and asks for her hand in marriage. He also asks her parents, and while Joachim is less enthusiastic about the idea, Anna is more encouraging. They are eventually betrothed, considered legally married while Joseph builds their home after which they were to have their wedding ceremony and begin to live together.

During this time, Mary is visited by an angel named Gabriel who announces that she was to conceive by the power of God and give birth to a son to be named Jesus, and who was to sit on the throne of David his ancestor. When she presses the angel as to how this was to be possible, she is told that nothing was impossible for God, and in fact, her kinswoman Elizabeth, who was elderly and thought to be barren, was in the sixth month of her pregnancy. With that, Mary accedes to the divine will. She shortly leaves for Ain Karem to visit Elizabeth, whose unborn child leaps in her womb at Mary's greeting. She stays with Elizabeth for three months before returning to Nazareth.

Upon her return, Mary is now visibly with child, and is scorned as a disgrace by the people of Nazareth. Joseph is quite understandably upset, but unwilling to subject Mary to the death penalty for adultery, he dismisses her quietly. However, an angel appears to him in a dream and tells him to not fear to take Mary as his wife, and that the child she bears was conceived by the Holy Spirit. Joseph subsequently goes through with the marriage ceremony and takes Mary into the home he built for them.

As Mary's due date approaches, a decree is issued from Caesar Augustus ordering a census of the Empire, and everyone was to register in their ancestral town. Joseph, being of the line of David, is therefore required to register in Bethlehem in Judaea. Mary goes with him to register, and after several days' journey, they arrive only to find all accommodations full, with none willing to give up their place for a pregnant woman. However, a maidservant points them in the direction of a cave used as a stable and although it is no luxury, it will provide shelter. Thankful for this, Joseph takes Mary there, where she gives birth to her son. While there, they receive the homage of shepherds who had received word of this event from a host of angels in the fields. Magi also arrive from the East bearing gifts for the newborn, having been led there by the appearance of a new star. Forty days after Jesus' birth, Joseph brings Mary and Jesus to the Temple for Mary's ceremony of purification after childbirth, and there she meets her old mentor Simeon, who praises God for the child, and warns Mary that a sword will pierce her own soul.

Prior to their arrival in Bethlehem, the Magi from the East had stopped by Herod's palace in Jerusalem to inquire about the new star. Herod, upon learning that it was the sign of a new king, had asked the Magi find out and tell him so that Herod may also worship him. But after the Magi are warned to return home by another route, Herod orders the destruction of all infants in Bethlehem. However, an angel warns Joseph, and he takes Mary and the child and they flee to Egypt where Jesus spends his early years. Upon Herod's death, an angel again speaks to Joseph, and the family returns to Nazareth.

Years later, Elizabeth's son John is baptizing and preaching repentance in preparation for the coming of one greater than he. He is confronted by Herod's son Antipas, his wife Herodias, and a prostitute working at the Herodian court, Magdalen. John admonishes Antipas to put away Herodias as she is married to his brother, and so are living in a sinful union, and he also warns Magdalen of her sinful lifestyle.

Mary's son, Jesus, is later seen in the desert in prayer, undergoing a temptation from the devil and overcoming it, before leaving to begin his ministry. He attends a wedding with his parents when he is told the wine had run out. Aware of his divine powers, Mary asks Jesus for help. He tells her his hour has not yet come, but nonetheless, Jesus orders the servants to fill the jars with water, and he miraculously turns it into wine. Shortly after this, Jesus departs on his ministry, and while he is away, Joseph falls ill and dies, with Mary at his side.

Jesus begins preaching the kingdom of God, and Magdalen comes across him and listens. However, she continues to ply her trade until she is caught by her husband in the village of Nain and is denounced. She is dragged into the street to be stoned as an adulteress just as Jesus and his disciples are walking by. The elders decide to ask him whether the woman should be stoned, but Jesus, after writing something on the ground, tells the crowd that anyone who is without sin could throw the first stone. Unable to meet his standard, they all drop their stones and walk away. With no one left to condemn her, Jesus tells her to go in peace, and not sin again.

Jesus' family in Nazareth are concerned about the danger Jesus is courting by his preaching and wish him to come home and stay safe. They discuss their concerns with Mary and they go to the house of the Pharisee Simon where Jesus is preaching. Unable to enter because of the crowd, they ask to see Jesus. When he is told that his mother and relatives are there, Jesus declares that his mother, and his brother, and his sister are those to do the will of God. Upset, Jesus' relatives tell Mary that Jesus has repudiated her and is no longer her son, but Mary instead declares that he is her Lord. She then follows Jesus throughout the rest of his ministry.

While listening to her son while he was preaching, Magdalen enters as he tells a parable of a son who squandered his father's inheritance, repented and returned, receiving the father's forgiveness. This cuts Magdalen to the heart and she cries for Mary. Mary approaches Magdalen and embraces her, and Magdalen rushes to Jesus, weeps on his feet and wipes them with her hair. Scandalized, Simon reminds Jesus of who this woman is and what she does, but Jesus tells him that she loves much because she has been forgiven much. He then assures Magdalen that her faith has saved her. She then joins the number of Jesus' disciples.

Later in Jerusalem, Jesus requests Magdalen to find a safe place for his mother while he and his disciples prepare for the Passover. Later at night, Jesus is praying in a garden asking to be spared from suffering. After that, one of Jesus' disciples, John, gives Mary and Magdalen the news that Jesus had been arrested. They rush to the High Priest's house and witness another of Jesus' disciples, Peter, denying any association with him. Peter is racked by grief and guilt when he meets Mary after his denial. They then speak with a Sanhedrin member, Joseph of Arimathea, who tells them that although he tried to have Jesus acquitted, he was outvoted, and Jesus has been convicted and condemned.

The next morning, Jesus is brought to the Roman governor of Judaea, Pontius Pilate, who orders Jesus scourged. Through a mysterious bond, Mary reacts physically to the blows inflicted on Jesus. Shortly after, Pilate offers to release one Jewish prisoner for the Passover. After the crowds demand for the release of a prisoner named Barrabas, and call for Jesus' execution, Pilate sentences Jesus to death and orders his crucifixion.

Jesus is forced to carry his cross through the streets of Jerusalem to the place of execution outside its walls. Roman soldiers prevent Mary from approaching Jesus, and is only able to touch a drop of his blood after he had passed. She, Magdalen and John follow Jesus to Golgotha, and there witness him crucified. Jesus entrusts his mother to John's care, and dies soon afterward. Jesus' body is taken down from the cross and given to his mother, who mourns the loss of her son. Jesus is then buried in a nearby tomb owned by Joseph of Arimathea.

On the third day after the execution, Mary is firm in her belief that Jesus would rise again, according to his promise. Magdalen takes some spices with which to anoint Jesus' body as it had been buried in haste. She arrives to find the tomb open and empty. A man nearby asks who it is she seeks, and thinking him to be the gardener, Magdalen asks the man if she knows where Jesus' body is, and to tell her so that she can retrieve it. The man then reveals himself to be the risen Jesus, who calls her by name. Jesus then commissions her to tell of his resurrection to his disciples.

Shortly after, Jesus appears to his mother, Mary. She turns to him and smiles.

== Cast ==
- Alissa Jung as Mary of Nazareth
- Paz Vega as Mary Magdalene
- Luca Marinelli as Joseph
- Andreas Pietschmann as Jesus
- Antonia Liskova as Herodias
- Thomas Trabacchi as Joazar
- Roberto Citran as Joachim
- Andrea Giordana as Herod the Great
- Antonella Attili as Anne
- Johannes Brandrup as Herod Antipas
- Nikolai Kinski as Judas Iscariot
- Toni Laudadio as Simon Petrus
- Sergio Múñiz as Antipater
- Robert Stadlober as Hircanus
- Remo Girone as Pontius Pilate
- Marco Rulli as John
- Marco Foschi as John the Baptist
- Mariano Rigillo as Simeon
- Marco Messeri as Zechariah
- Ditta Teresa Acerbis as Elisabeth
- Raffaele Vannoli as Joseph of Arimathea
- Alice Bellagamba as Salome
- Yassine Ben Gamra as Matthias
