= Abraham (1993 film) =

1994 television movie directed by Joseph Sargent

- Genre: Adventure; Biography; Drama
- Written by: Robert McKee
- Directed by: Joseph Sargent
- Starring: Richard Harris; Barbara Hershey; Maximilian Schell; Vittorio Gassman
- Music by: Marco Frisina; Ennio Morricone
- Original language: English
- No. of episodes: 2

Production
- Producers: Laura Fattori; Lorenzo Minoli
- Production location: Ouarzazate, Morocco
- Cinematography: Raffaele Mertes
- Editor: Michael Brown
- Running time: 184 minutes

Original release
- Network: TNT
- Release: December 12 – December 13, 1993

Abraham is a 1993 television miniseries based on the life of the Biblical patriarch Abraham produced by Five Mile River Films. It was shot in Ouarzazate, Morocco. Directed by Joseph Sargent, it stars Richard Harris as Abraham, Barbara Hershey as Sarah, Maximilian Schell as Pharaoh and Vittorio Gassman as Terah. The film is the first in the Bible Collection series by TNT.

== Plot ==
Abram lives in Harran, a rich city. His wife Sarai is childless, and their only heir is Eliezer of Damascus. One day, Abraham hears the voice of God, who says that he must leave Harran and travel to an unknown land. God promises to make a great nation from him and renames him Abraham and his wife Sarai as Sarah. The pattern for the plot is the Genesis chapters 11–25.

== Cast ==
- Richard Harris as Abraham
- Barbara Hershey as Sarah
- Maximilian Schell as Pharaoh
- Vittorio Gassman as Terah
- Carolina Rosi as Hagar
- Andrea Prodan as Lot
- Gottfried John as Eliezer
- Kevin McNally as Nahor
- Simona Ferraro Chartoff as Lot's Wife
- Tom Radcliffe as Serug
  - Aziz Khaldoun as Young Serug
- Jude Alderson as Mikah
- Evelina Meghangi as Reumah
- Giuseppe Peluso as Ishmael (age 16)
  - Danny Mertsoy as Ishmael (age 9)
- Taylor Scipio as Isaac (age 11)
  - Timur Yusef as Isaac (age 5)
