= Roger Young (director) =

American TV and film director (born 1942)

- Born: Roger E. Young; May 13, 1942 (age 84); Champaign, Illinois, U.S.
- Occupation: Director
- Website: rogyoung.net

Roger E. Young (born May 13, 1942 in Champaign, Illinois) is an American television and film director.

== Career ==
Young graduated with a Bachelor of Science degree in journalism from the University of Illinois. He worked as a producer-director at Channel 6, the NBC affiliate in Indianapolis. He then moved to Chicago and became a producer for Foote-Cone & Belding Advertising, where he produced national commercials. Later he moved to directing commercials for the production company of Lippert-Saviano, and then for Topel & Associates, before opening his own production company, Young & Company, producing and directing commercials. In 1977 he moved to Los Angeles and was hired as associate producer on a television film entitled Something for Joey. This led to being offered associate producer of Lou Grant. Gene Reynolds, executive producer of the show, became Young's mentor, and in the second season Young was given the opportunity to direct an episode. He won an Emmy and two Director's Guild Awards for directing episodes of the series. He then directed the two-hour pilot of Magnum, P.I.. Young directed several other pilots, all but one of which was turned into a series. Young then began to concentrate on films and mini-series. Young has written five teleplays that have been produced. His episodic work include Rome, The Closer and Law & Order: LA.

== Filmography ==
Year	Name	Type	Credits			Ref
Year	Name	Type	Director	Writer	Producer	
1977	Something for Joey	TV film			Yes	
1981	Bitter Harvest	TV film	Yes			
1982	An Innocent Love	TV film	Yes			
1982	Dreams Don't Die	TV film	Yes			
1982	Two of a Kind	TV film	Yes			
1984	Lassiter	Film	Yes			
1985	Gulag	TV film	Yes			
1985	Into Thin Air	TV film	Yes			
1986	Under Siege	TV film	Yes			
1987	Love Among Thieves	TV film	Yes			
1987	The Squeeze	Film	Yes			
1988	The Bourne Identity	TV film	Yes			
1990	Murder in Mississippi	TV film	Yes			
1990	Love and Lies	TV film	Yes			
1991	Held Hostage: The Sis and Jerry Levin Story	TV film	Yes			
1991	Doublecrossed	TV film	Yes	Yes		
1991	Nightmare in Columbia County	TV film	Yes			
1992	Jewels	TV film	Yes	Yes		
1993	For Love and Glory	TV film	Yes	Yes		
1993	Geronimo	TV film	Yes			
1993	Mercy Mission: The Rescue of Flight 771	TV film	Yes			
1994	Getting Gotti	TV film	Yes			
1994	Mortal Fear	TV film		Yes		
1995	Virus	TV film		Yes		
1995	Joseph	TV film	Yes			
1995	Moses	TV film	Yes			
1996	The Siege at Ruby Ridge	TV film	Yes			
1997	Sisters and Other Strangers	TV film	Yes			
1997	Heart Full of Rain	TV film	Yes			
1997	Final Descent	TV film		Yes		
1997	Solomon	TV film	Yes			
1998	A Knight in Camelot	TV film	Yes			
1999	Kiss the Sky	Film	Yes			
1999	Jesus	TV film	Yes			
1999	One Special Night	TV film	Yes			
2000	Paul the Apostle	TV film	Yes			
2000	The Thin Blue Lie	TV film	Yes		Yes	
2002	Dracula	Miniseries	Yes	Yes		
2003	Imperium: Augustus	TV film	Yes			
2004	The Perfect Husband: The Laci Peterson Story	TV film	Yes			
2005	Hercules	Miniseries	Yes			
2012	Barabbas	Miniseries	Yes			
2014	The Red Tent	Miniseries	Yes			

== Awards and nominations ==
- Directors Guild of America Award: "Lou Grant"
- Directors Guild of America Award: "Lou Grant"
- Emmy Award: Directorial Achievement, "Lou Grant"
- Emmy nomination: Directorial Achievement, "Bitter Harvest"
- Humanitas Award: "Bitter Harvest"
- Humanitas Award: "Two of a Kind"
- ACE Award nomination: Directorial Achievement, "Gulag"
- ACE Award nomination: Best Picture, "Gulag"
- Emmy nomination: Best Mini-Series, "Bourne Identity"
- Golden Globe nomination: Best Mini-Series, "Bourne Identity"
- Emmy nomination: Best Film, "Murder in Mississippi"
- Directors Guild of America Award: Directorial Achievement, "Murder in Mississippi"
- ACE Award: Best Motion Picture, "DoubleCrossed"
- Golden Globe nomination: Best Picture, "Jewels"
- Emmy Award: Best Mini-Series, "Joseph"
- Emmy nomination: Best Mini-Series, "Moses"
- Emmy nomination: Best Mini-Series, "Jesus"
