= Genesis: The Creation and the Flood =

- Based on: Book of Genesis
- Directed by: Ermanno Olmi
- Starring: Omero Antonutti; Annabi Abdelialil; Sabir Aziz; Haddou Zoubida; B. Haddan Mohammed
- Country of origin: Italy

Production
- Running time: 101 minutes

Original release
- Release: 16 September 1994

Genesis: The Creation and the Flood (Italian: Genesi: La creazione e il diluvio; also called The Bible: Genesis in Australia) is a 1994 television film shot in Morocco, directed by an Italian film director, renowned Ermanno Olmi. It is based on the Book of Genesis, first book of the Hebrew Bible, where the creation of the world and the Great Flood are described.

This film utilizes a cast of native Bedouins. Text of Genesis is read by a narrator, who at times appears as an elderly desert nomad telling the story to his extended Bedouin family.

Modern clips of warfare and destruction are used to illustrate some Old Testament pronouncements about the evils practiced by mankind. The script fairly accurately follows the first nine chapters of Genesis, with a few added portions, like excerpts from the Song of Songs, Leviticus 26, and Psalm 50.

== Plot ==
This story begins with the creation of this planet. It is told by an old desert shepherd whose grandson is very young and curious.

The old man also mentions Adam and Eve, their temptation and transgression by a snake which led to their permanent banishment from the Garden of Eden.

The story continues with the first crime committed by mankind: Cain murdering his brother Abel.

Genealogy of Cain and genealogy of Seth are also given.

Mankindʻs corruption was great on Earth. God felt regret for making humans, but there was a man called Noah. He and his family obediently build an ark to guard themselves and animals from a flood that will wash away mankind's wickedness.

All these events are told through the clear and simple words of an old nomad shepherd.

== Cast ==
- Omero Antonutti (voiced in English by Paul Scofield) – old narrator / Noah
- Sabir Aziz – Adam
- Haddou Zoubida – Eve
- Annabi Abdelialil – Cain
- B. Haddan Mohammed – Abel
