= Moses (miniseries) =

1995 television miniseries

- DVD Cover
- Written by: Lionel Chetwynd
- Directed by: Roger Young
- Starring: Ben Kingsley; Frank Langella; Christopher Lee
- Music by: Marco Frisina
- Countries of origin: United States; Czech Republic; United Kingdom; France; Germany; Italy; Spain
- Original language: English

Production
- Producers: Heinrich Krauss; Lorenzo Minoli; Roberto Pace; Melissa Taylor
- Cinematography: Raffaele Mertes
- Editor: Benjamin A. Weissman
- Running time: 182 minutes
- Production companies: Antena 3 Televisión; Beta Film; British Sky Broadcasting; Ceská Televize; France 2 Cinéma; Lube Productions; Lux Vide; MTM Enterprises; Nederlandse Christelijke Radio-Vereniging; Quinta Communications; RAI Radiotelevisione Italiana; TNT; Taurus Film; Turner Pictures Worldwide

Original release
- Release: 20 December 1995

Moses is a 1995 internationally co-produced Biblical drama television miniseries directed by Roger Young, written by Lionel Chetwynd, and starring Ben Kingsley, Frank Langella and Christopher Lee. It is a standalone sequel to the 1995 miniseries, Joseph, and the 1994 film, Jacob. Moses was shot in Morocco and aired in the United States on the TNT Network and internationally on the Trinity Broadcasting Network. The film is a part of TNT's Bible Collection.

== Plot ==
Moses, an Israelite raised by the Egyptian royal family, is chosen by God to release the Hebrew people from slavery and lead them to the Promised Land. Based on the biblical story.

== Cast ==
- Ben Kingsley – Moses
- Frank Langella – Merneptah
- Christopher Lee – Pharaoh
- Anton Lesser – Eliav
- Philip Stone – Jethro
- Anna Galiena – Ptira
- David Suchet – Aaron
- Geraldine McEwan – Miriam
- Anthony Higgins – Korah
- Urbano Barberini as Nahbi
- Enrico Lo Verso – Joshua
- Maurice Roëves – Zerack
- Sônia Braga –Zipporah (uncredited)
- Vincent Riotta – Midan

== Reception ==
Peter T. Chattaway from Patheos gave Moses a good review and praised Kingsley's performance: "For sheer human realism, Kingsley's is probably the best interpretation of Moses any film has offered to date."

Moses was nominated for a Primetime Emmy Award in the category of "Outstanding Miniseries". In a 2006 interview, Kingsley described the role of Moses as one of his most challenging and enjoyable screen roles to date. He also recalled a moment when he and Lee had kept the extras and crew entertained during a break between shooting with a rendition of "Moses Supposes" from the musical Singin' in the Rain.

== See also ==
- Hagiography, a biography of a saint or other spiritual leader
- Philo, who wrote On the Life of Moses
- Artapanus of Alexandria, a Jewish historian who wrote about Moses
- Biblical paraphrase
- Biblical apocrypha
- The Tables of the Law
- Stone Tables
- The Ten Commandments (1923 film)
- The Ten Commandments (1956 film)
- Moses the Lawgiver
- Moses (miniseries)
- The Prince of Egypt
- The Ten Commandments (2007 film)
- Exodus: Gods and Kings
- Os Dez Mandamentos
