= Joseph (1995 film) =

1995 television miniseries

- Written by: James Carrington; Lionel Chetwynd
- Directed by: Roger Young
- Starring: Ben Kingsley; Paul Mercurio; Martin Landau; Lesley Ann Warren
- Music by: Marco Frisina; Ennio Morricone
- Original language: English

Production
- Producers: Luca Bernabei; Laura Fattori
- Cinematography: Raffaele Mertes
- Editor: Benjamin A. Weissman
- Running time: 185 minutes

Original release
- Network: TNT
- Release: April 16, 1995

The Bible: Joseph is a 1995 German/Italian/American television miniseries about the life of Joseph from the Old Testament. It’s a sequel to the 1994 film, Jacob, with Martin Landau replacing Matthew Modine as Jacob. It was filmed in Morocco and aired on TNT on April 16, 1995. At the 47th Primetime Emmy Awards, from five nominations, Joseph won Outstanding Miniseries, becoming the first show on a cable network to win in that Category. It is followed by the 1995 miniseries, Moses, directed by Roger Young and starring Ben Kingsley in the titular role.

== Plot ==
In Ancient Egypt, Joseph is a Hebrew slave to Potiphar, Pharaoh Ahmose I's captain of the guard. The overseer Ednan torments Joseph for his refusal to show deference, but Joseph earns his respect by reading, and Ednan increasingly relies on Joseph. Potiphar's wife unsuccessfully tries to seduce Joseph, and falsely accuses him of rape. Joseph explains his life story to Potiphar to restore trust.

A few years after the events of the previous film, Jacob, now an older man, and his family settle near the city of Shechem. Joseph is the second youngest son of Jacob and Rachel; the latter having died after giving birth to Benjamin. One day, Jacob gives Joseph a beautiful coat and makes him his successor; feeling he's more trustworthy than Simeon and Levi who'd endangered the tribe by sacking Shechem after their prince raped their sister Dinah, as well as Reuben who'd committed adultery with Leah's handmaiden Bilhah. Enraged by this and blinded by jealousy, Joseph's half-brothers dump him into a lot of snakes and sell him into slavery; except for Reuben who tried to save him.

Potiphar announces that Joseph will go to Pharaoh's prison for humiliating his wife. In prison, Joseph earns a reputation as a talented interpreter of dreams. He makes two accurate interpretations of the dreams of the royal cupbearer and the royal baker, both imprisoned on suspicion of theft.

Pharaoh summons Joseph to interpret his own troubling dreams. Joseph says the seven fat cows and the seven full ears of corn in the dream mean there will be seven years of plenty, but the seven sickly cows and the seven thin ears of corn signify seven years of severe famine caused by a drought. Joseph suggests that all the farmers give one-fifth of their crops to Pharaoh for storage for the coming famine. Impressed, Pharaoh appoints Joseph as governor, second only to Pharaoh; he also gives Joseph a wife, Asenath. Potiphar and Ednan now serve under Joseph.

Seven years later, the famine began. Joseph and Asenath have two sons, Manasseh and Ephraim. In Canaan, Jacob learns of the abundance in Egypt and sends most of his sons to buy grain. Joseph recognizes his brothers, accuses them of spying, and throws them into prison; where Reuben declares his belief they're being divinely punished for betraying their family. Joseph insists they prove their innocence by bringing the youngest brother Benjamin to Egypt.

After the brothers bring Benjamin, he is framed for theft and arrested. When they rise up against their guards, Joseph reveals his true identity to all of them. Benjamin immediately embraces Joseph, but the others are ashamed. Joseph embraces each one in turn, saying that God used their evil intentions for the ultimate good, preparing Joseph for his current position so that he can provide for his extended family.

Joseph sends his brothers home to bring Jacob and the entire settlement to Egypt during the remaining five years of the famine. The clan arrives in Egypt to be reunited with Joseph, not knowing what their descendants will face in the years ahead.

== Cast ==
- Ben Kingsley – Potiphar
- Paul Mercurio – Joseph
  - Rinaldo Rocco – Young Joseph (17 yrs)
  - Timur Yusef – Young Joseph (8 yrs)
- Martin Landau – Jacob
- Lesley Ann Warren – Potiphar's wife
- Alice Krige – Rachel
- Dominique Sanda – Leah
- Warren Clarke – Ednan
- Monica Bellucci – Pharaoh's wife
- Stefano Dionisi – Pharaoh
- Valeria Cavalli – Asenath
- Kelly Miller – Tamar
- Gloria Carlin – Bilhah
- Michael Angelis – Reuben
- Vincenzo Nicoli – Simeon
- Colin Bruce – Levi
- Michael Attwell – Judah
- Davide Cincis – Dan
- Rodolfo Corsato – Naphtali
- Pete Lee Wilson – Gad
- Silvestre Tobias – Asher
- Diego Wallraff – Issachar
- Michael Zimmerman – Zebulun
- Jamie Glover – Benjamin
  - Brett Warren – Young Benjamin (9 yrs)
- Paloma Baeza – Dinah
- Anna Mazzotti – Zilpah
- Andrew Clover – Shechem
- Arthur Brauss – Hamor
- Eric P. Caspar – Bera
- Anton Alexander – Hirah
- Milton Johns – Cupbearer
- Renato Scarpa – Baker
- Peter Eyre – Vizir
- Timothy Bateson – Priest
- Nadim Sawalha – Ishmaelite
- Josh Maguire – Manasseh
- Gabriel Thomson – Ephraim
- Oliver Cotton – Architect

== Crew ==
- Directed by Roger Young
- Teleplay by Lionel Chetwynd
  - based on the novel by James Carrington
- Produced by Lorenzo Minoli and Gerald Rafshoon
- Music by Marco Frisina and Ennio Morricone
- Director of Photography Raffaele Mertes
- Film Editor: Benjamin A. Weissman, ACE
- Costumes by Enrico Sabbatini

== Awards and nominations ==
Year	Award	Category	Nominee(s)	Result	Ref.
1995	CableACE Awards	Supporting Actor in a Movie or Miniseries	Ben Kingsley	Nominated	
1995	CableACE Awards	Art Direction in a Dramatic Special or Series/Movie or Miniseries	Paolo Biagetti and Enrico Sabbatini	Nominated	
1995	CableACE Awards	Costume Design	Enrico Sabbatini	Nominated	
1995	CableACE Awards	Original Score	Marco Frisina	Won	
1995	Primetime Emmy Awards	Outstanding Miniseries	Gerald Rafshoon, Lorenzo Minoli, and Laura Fattori	Won	
1995	Primetime Emmy Awards	Outstanding Supporting Actor in a Miniseries or a Special	Ben Kingsley	Nominated	
1995	Primetime Emmy Awards	Outstanding Individual Achievement in Art Direction for a Miniseries or a Special	Enrico Sabbatini and Paolo Biagetti (for "Part 1")	Nominated	
1995	Primetime Emmy Awards	Outstanding Individual Achievement in Casting	Jeremy Zimmermann and Shaila Rubin	Nominated	
1995	Primetime Emmy Awards	Outstanding Individual Achievement in Sound Editing for a Miniseries or a Special	G. Michael Graham, Joe Melody, Kristi Johns, Tim Terusa, David C. Eichhorn, Anton Holden, Rusty Tinsley, Rick Crampton, Mark Steele, John K. Adams, Bob Costanza, Mike Dickeson, Darren Wright, Gary Macheel, Richard S. Steele, Bill Bell, Tim Chilton, and Jill Schachne (for "Part 1")	Nominated	
1996	Writers Guild of America Awards	Adapted Long Form	Lionel Chetwynd	Nominated	

== See also ==
- List of films featuring slavery
- List of historical period drama films and series set in Near Eastern and Western civilization
