= Joseph of Nazareth (film) =

- Directed by: Raffaele Mertes
- Story by: Gianmario Pagano
- Starring: Tobias Moretti
- Release date: January 5, 2000
- Country: Italy
- Language: Italian

Joseph of Nazareth (Italian: Giuseppe di Nazareth) is a 2000 Italian made for television film dramatizing the life of Joseph of Nazareth. It was directed by Raffaele Mertes, who has directed several other Biblical movies, and Elisabetta Marchetti (it).

== Cast ==
- Tobias Moretti – Joseph
- Stefania Rivi (it) – Mary
- Ennio Fantastichini – Herod
- Massimo Reale (it) – Joses
- Francesco Dominedò (it) – Simon
- Andrea Prodan – Antipater
- Imma Piro (it) – Anne
- Ida Di Benedetto – Elizabeth
- Mattia Sbragia – astrologer
- Renato Scarpa – scribe
- Omar Lahlou – Jude
