= Lionel Chetwynd =

British-American film director

Lionel Chetwynd (born January 29, 1940) is a British-Canadian-American screenwriter, director and producer.

== Life and career ==
Lionel Chetwynd was born to a Jewish family in Hackney, London, the son of Betty (née Dion) and Peter Chetwynd. His family moved to Canada when he was eight years old. Problems within his dysfunctional family led him to quit school at the age of 14.

Chetwynd returned the following year but was promptly expelled. He then enlisted in the Canadian Army. After serving with The Black Watch (Royal Highland Regiment) of Canada, Chetwynd turned his life around.

He walked into Sir George Williams University — now Montreal's Concordia University — and waited two hours to meet its principal, Henry F. Hall, who had a reputation for giving students a second chance. After a battery of tests, Chetwynd received conditional admittance as a mature student.

Chetwynd became an honours student in philosophy and economics. He also championed Sir George Williams University on televised youth panels and in debating competitions. Shortly after graduating as valedictorian, Chetwynd married future Hollywood actor Gloria Carlin, whom he met at Sir George.

He excelled to the point that he earned a scholarship to Montreal's McGill University Law School. At McGill law he served as a contributing editor for the McGill Law Journal.

While a law student he also found employment at the beginning of preparations for the forthcoming Expo67, beginning as a laborer on the man-made islands. He quickly found a transfer to the Critical Path Section and then was moved into the Entertainment Branch. By January, 1967, three months before the opening of the fair, he had risen to a senior position within the E Branch with responsibility for approving all media licenses to the fair with the title Directeur de Reproduction, Terre des Hommes (Director of Reproduction, Man and World).

After obtaining his degree, Chetwynd did graduate work in law in the United Kingdom at Trinity College, Oxford. After completing his studies, he remained in London, working for Columbia Pictures's distribution branch where he worked his way up to assistant managing director. Pursuing an interest in writing screenplays, after he met Canadian film director Ted Kotcheff, Chetwynd co-wrote the script for the film The Apprenticeship of Duddy Kravitz with fellow Montrealer Mordecai Richler who had written the novel from which it was adapted.

=== 1970s ===
After finishing the script, Chetwynd moved to New York City. His career took off after he won the Writers Guild of America Award for Best Comedy Adapted from Another Medium and a nomination for the Academy Award for Writing Adapted Screenplay. In 1975 he wrote and produced Goldenrod starring his wife, Gloria Carlin, and Tony Lo Bianco. That same year, he wrote and produced Johnny, We Hardly Knew Ye about John F. Kennedy's first run for congress, based on the book by David Powers and Kenny O'Donnell, for which he won a Christopher Award. In 1977, he was hired by Marlo Thomas to pen a gender-reversal made-for-television version of It's a Wonderful Life entitled It Happened One Christmas, in which Thomas played the lead role portrayed by James Stewart in the original.

Hired to write scripts for CBS (Love of Life) and PBS television networks, Chetwynd soon turned to directing his own screenplays, meeting with success for his 1978 film Two Solitudes. Adapted by Chetwynd from the Hugh MacLennan book, and starring Jean-Pierre Aumont, Stacy Keach, and Claude Jutra, the film dealt with societal issues relative to Canada's French and English speaking population and the Conscription Crisis of 1917. The film marked a turning point for Chetwynd and he would go on to write, direct, and produce numerous issue or event-based American films.

A supporter of Ronald Reagan, Chetwynd's work, pronouncements, and endorsement of conservative ideologies, made him a favorite of the political right in the United States.

=== 1980s ===
Chetwynd's diverse film works include productions such as the 1981 made for television story Miracle on Ice (Christopher Award) that recounted the U.S. ice hockey team's dramatic upset victory over the Soviet Union at the 1980 Winter Olympics. Under the pen name Peter Dion, he scripted The Hot Touch for which he received a Canadian Genie nomination but which, sadly, was both the last film directed by Roger Vadim and the last film that included Melvin Douglas. A member of the National Sponsoring Committee of the Vietnam Veterans Memorial Fund, Chetwynd wrote and directed the 1987 drama The Hanoi Hilton that dealt with the treatment of American P.O.W.s during the Vietnam War in Hanoi's notorious Hoa Lo prison. That year he was commissioned to create and write a special tribute to the United States Congress as part of the Constitutional Bicentennial celebration.

In 1988, Chetwynd also wrote the four-hour miniseries for A&E Television, To Heal a Nation(George Washington Medal), a biopic of Jan Scruggs, a Vietnam veteran who returned home disillusioned and disenchanted, later founding the Vietnam Veterans Memorial Fund. He also wrote and helped produce the gala that celebrated the 200th anniversary of the U.S. Constitution starring Ben Vereen, that was presented in Philadelphia before members of congress and the Supreme Court. His 1983 Sadat starring Lou Gossett, which was cited by the NAACP Image Awards, was the first OPT mini-series. He produced the Christopher Award-winning Evil in Clear River.

=== 1990s ===
From 1992 to 1996 he executive produced, wrote, and frequently directed episodes of the PBS series Reverse Angle and its successor National Desk, public affairs series that earned multiple Telly Awards and a New York Festival Gold Medal. In 1993 he wrote Heroes of Desert Storm (directed by Don Ohlmeyer). Among his other issue-based works, Chetwynd wrote the screenplay and produced the Genie-nominated Kissinger and Nixon (1995), Color of Justice (1997) and wrote the scripts for Ruby Ridge: An American Tragedy, a four-hour miniseries for CBS, and The Man Who Captured Eichmann. In 1999 he wrote the teleplay for the ABC miniseries, Tom Clancy's Net Force.

Chetwynd has also made biblical films, notably Jacob (1994), Joseph (1996 - Emmy winner, Best Miniseries) and Moses (1996), which was also nominated for an Emmy; the later two were both nominated for Emmys.

=== 2000s ===
In 2001, Chetwynd wrote and directed Varian's War, the story of Varian Fry, an American who helped numerous intellectuals and artists escape from Nazi-occupied France during World War II. The film earned Chetwynd his fifth Writers Guild of American "Best Screenplay" nomination, as well as a special citation from The American Society of Yad Vashem and the Jewish Image Award for best film.

In 2001, Chetwynd was appointed by President George W. Bush to serve on the President's Committee on the Arts and Humanities. In 2003, Chetwynd wrote and produced DC 9/11: Time of Crisis, a docudrama for Showtime Networks recounting the nine days in the Bush administration between the time of the September 11, 2001 attacks on the World Trade Center and The Pentagon and the president's televised address to the nation before Congress.

In 2002, Chetwynd wrote, produced and directed Darkness at High Noon: The Carl Foreman Documents, a PBS documentary that recounted the life and career of American Communist Party member Carl Foreman. The story deals with events during McCarthyism that saw Foreman, a talented film producer and screenwriter, blacklisted by the Hollywood movie studio bosses in the 1950s.

After Darkness at High Noon, he subsequently received an Emmy nomination for writing and producing Ike: Countdown to D-Day starring Tom Selleck, and wrote and produced the political documentary Celsius 41.11 and the historical film We Fight To Be Free.

=== 2010s ===
Chetwynd continued his work in documentaries, notably producing and directing An Improbable Dream (2016) which traced the lives of students of Canada's National Ballet School from their 10th and 11th birthdays into their early 50s. It met with great success, receiving New York Festival Gold Medals for both directing and also producing, as well as a People's Telly Award. During this time he has worked on several other projects including a series for FX and a mini-series dealing with the end of the Cold War and the Armenian genocide.

Chetwynd has more than 60 longform and feature credits and over two dozen documentary credits, which have received numerous citations including six Writers Guild of America nominations (including an award), New York Film festival gold medal, two Christophers, six Tellys, two Genie nominations and two George Washington medals from the Freedom Foundation at Valley Forge.

In 2003, Chetwynd received the Caucus of Writers, Producers and Directors Lifetime Achievement Award, and in 2011 he received their Writer of the Year award. In 2003 he was also conferred an honorary doctorate by Columbia College-Hollywood. In 2008, he received the John Singleton Copley Medal from the National Portrait Gallery/Smithsonian.

In 2004, Chetwynd became a founding member of Friends of Abe, an organization of Hollywood conservatives.

Chetwynd appeared with Roger L. Simon, founder of Pajamas Media, in the PJTV show Poliwood, discussing topics that cover the intersection of politics and Hollywood.

== Personal life ==
Chetwynd was married to actress Gloria Carlin, who appeared in several of his films. They had two sons and resided in Beverly Hills, California until her death in 2026.

He holds British, Canadian and American citizenship.
