= Esther (1999 film) =

- DVD release cover
- Genre: Biblical drama
- Based on: Book of Esther
- Screenplay by: Sandy Niemand
- Directed by: Raffaele Mertes
- Starring: Louise Lombard; F. Murray Abraham; Jürgen Prochnow; Thomas Kretschmann; Ornella Muti; Natasha Williams
- Theme music composer: Ennio Morricone
- Countries of origin: United States; Italy; Germany
- Original language: English

Production
- Producers: Roberta Cadringher; Lorenzo Minoli
- Cinematography: Giovanni Galasso
- Editor: Alessandro Lucidi
- Running time: 90 minutes
- Production companies: Five Mile River Films; Lux Vide; Beta Film; Quinta

Original release
- Release: December 5, 2000

Esther, also known as The Bible: Esther, is a 1999 American-Italian-German television film based on the Book of Esther, directed by Raffaele Mertes and starring Louise Lombard as Queen Esther, F. Murray Abraham as Mordechai, Jürgen Prochnow as Haman, Thomas Kretschmann as King Achashverosh and Ornella Muti as Vashti.

It aired in the United States on November 5, 2000.

== Plot ==
Hadassah, a beautiful Jewish girl, lives with her cousin (and legal guardian) Mordecai in Shushan, the capital of Persia. After King Ahasuerus deposes Queen Vashti for her refusal to obey him, he is advised to choose a new queen. Guards then search the entire kingdom for worthy candidates, taking them from their homes by force to the palace. Mordecai attempts to hide Hadassah but she is captured by the guards. For her protection and at the insistence of Mordecai, Hadassah changes her name to Esther, meaning "hidden". Esther and the rest of the young women are taken to the first harem, where they are placed under the custody of Haggai, a royal eunuch and chief custodian of the harem. Meanwhile, Haman, another royal advisor rises to power and the favor of the king. Memuchan, a trusted chamberlain of the king, is wary of Haman's ambition. Mordecai also makes an enemy of Haman, due to Mordecai’s refusal to bow to Haman as others do. Haman plots revenge on Mordecai.

After a time of purification, it is time for Esther and the other women to present themselves to the king for one night each. After spending the night with Esther, the King falls in love with her and crowns her queen. Sometime later, Mordecai overhears a plot by two of the king's guards, Bigthan and Teresh, against the king and reports this to Esther. Esther exposes the plot to the king, and the men are sentenced to death.

The king's chamberlain Memuchan dies and King Ahasuerus mourns his loss. Esther requests to be received, but the king takes no heed. Haman comes and tells the king to govern once again, but the king takes no heed again. Esther leaves and believes she has lost the king's favor. The king then appoints Haman as lord chamberlain. The next day, Esther calls Haggai to her chambers and asks him what she should do to win back the king's favor. Haggai answers that she must be patient. Meanwhile, Mordecai once again refuses to bow to Haman. Haman's wife Zeresh, family and servants tell him that Mordecai does not respect him. This further angers Haman, and they suggest he builds a gallows 50 cubits high to hang Mordecai upon. Haman then goes to the king and tells him a certain race of people wish to overthrow the king. The king, concerned, gives Haman his signet ring which gives him the right to decree a law that even the king cannot change. Haman sends a decree to all provinces that they should kill all Jews within their borders. On hearing this decree, Mordecai dresses himself in sackcloth and ashes and mourns outside the palace gates for several days and nights. Upon hearing this, Esther orders her servant, Hatach, to give Mordecai clothes. Mordecai refuses them and gives the letter of the decree to Esther, telling Esther to petition the king, although it is forbidden to go before the king without being called. Esther is reminded that if the king holds out his golden scepter, her life will be spared. Esther tells Mordecai to gather all the Jews and fast for three days on her behalf. After three days, she dresses in the royal robes of state and goes before the king. The king holds out his scepter, asks her petition, and promises her that it shall be granted. Esther invites Haman and the king to attend a banquet she has prepared in her quarters. At the banquet, the king again asks Esther her petition and request. Esther promises the king that she will tell him her petition if they return to the banquet once again the following day.

That night, King Ahasuerus wakes up after having a nightmare, and not able to sleep, asks the royal eunuchs to read the chronicle. They discover that Mordecai was never rewarded for revealing the plot of Bigthan and Teresh. Haman comes to ask permission for the gallows, but the king asks what to do for a man the king wishes to honor. Haman believes that to refer to himself, and describes an ornate ceremonial parade through the city. He is then told to perform this in honor of Mordechai. The ceremony is completed, and Haman then returns to his house in shame and anger.

At Esther's second banquet, the king asks once again what she desires, and she asks him to spare her life and the lives of her people. The king asks her who would do dare raise a hand against her, and she reveals the plots of Haman, including the plot to kill her own cousin, Mordecai. The king, enraged, tells his guards to hang Haman on his own gallows. The king appoints Mordecai as his new lord chamberlain. Esther asks the king to revoke the law made by Haman, but as it is not possible to revoke a law made by the king, he tells her she must find another solution. With the help of Mordecai, she asks the king to create the law that for one day, the Jews can defend themselves against any that are persecuting them, and the king grants her request. After the fighting is over, Esther then passes a law that the Jews must celebrate the day that changed their fate, the celebration of Purim.

In the final scene, some of the Jews are shown returning home to Jerusalem, led by Ezra.

== Cast ==
- Louise Lombard as Hadassah / Queen Esther of Persia
- F. Murray Abraham as Mordechai
- Jürgen Prochnow as Haman
- Thomas Kretschmann as King Ahasuerus of Persia
- Ornella Muti as Vashti
- Frank Baker as Ezra
- John Hollis as Harbona
- Umberto Orsini as Memucan
- Phil Davies as Hegai
- Natasha Williams as Mimouna
- Peter Halliday as Carshena
- Christopher Ettridge as Hathach
- Darren Bransford as Nehemiah
- Renato Scarpa as Eunuch
