= Judas (2001 film) =

2001 film by Raffaele Mertes

Film poster

Gli amici di Gesù - Giuda is a 2001 Italian-German coproduction television movie produced by Raffaele Mertes. It was included in the Turner Bible Collection series as Close to Jesus - Judas. The cast includes Enrico Lo Verso as Judas Iscariot, Danny Quinn as Jesus, and Mathieu Carrière as Pontius Pilate.
