= Solomon (film) =

1997 American television miniseries

- Teleplay by: Bradley T. Winter
- Directed by: Roger Young
- Starring: Ben Cross; Anouk Aimée; Vivica A. Fox; Max von Sydow; Maria Grazia Cucinotta
- Music by: Ennio Morricone; Patrick Williams
- Countries of origin: United States; United Kingdom; Italy
- Original language: English

Production
- Producers: Eleonora Andreatta; Luca Bernabei; Heinrich Krauss; Susu Langlands; Paolo Lucidi; Lorenzo Minoli; Paolo Piria; Gerald Rafshoon
- Cinematography: Raffaele Mertes
- Editor: Benjamin A. Weissman
- Running time: 180 minutes

Original release
- Network: RAI
- Release: 15 December – 17 December 1997

Solomon is a 1997 television miniseries for RAI that retells the Bible's story of Solomon. Directed by Roger Young, it stars Ben Cross as Solomon, Vivica A. Fox as the Queen of Sheba, Anouk Aimée as Bathsheba and Max von Sydow as David.

== Plot ==
The film begins with David still king of Israel. His sons Adonijah and Solomon are fierce rivals because both are prospective heirs to the throne. Adonijah challenges Solomon to a chariot race during a hunting expedition, which Solomon wins because Adonijah loses control of his chariot.

King David is aged and sickly, and announces that Solomon is the rightful heir to the throne over Israel. King David announces and ordains Solomon as king in sight of the people.

Shortly after, King David dies and Solomon gives the order for Adonijah to be killed, who also was in an attempt to usurp the throne from Solomon. After this, God comes to Solomon in a dream and Solomon asks God to grant him wisdom that he may guide Israel well. God grants this desire to him.

With his newfound wisdom, Solomon proceeds to build the Temple of God in Jerusalem, according to the architectural plans that his father David had left behind. Soon after the Temple is successfully constructed, things begin to take a downward turn. Solomon begins to take more wives in direct violation of the Mosaic Law.

The Queen of Sheba makes a royal visit to Jerusalem. Solomon meets her and becomes infatuated with her. Solomon courts and impregnates her and aspires to make her his royal Queen, to the priests’ and council’s displeasure.

The story continues as Solomon’s ego and power-drunken attitude, much like his father's, cause things in his kingdom to spiral out of control.

== Cast ==
- Ben Cross as Solomon
- Anouk Aimée as Bathsheba
- Vivica A. Fox as Queen of Sheba
- Max von Sydow as David
- David Suchet as Joab
- Maria Grazia Cucinotta as Abishag
- Umberto Orsini as Nathan
- Stefania Rocca as Hannah
- Richard Dillane as Jeroboam
- Marta Zoffoli as Basemah
- Ivan Kaye as Adonijah
- G.W. Bailey as Azarel
- Dexter Fletcher as Rehoboam
- Roger Hammond as Zadok
- Michael Culkin as Hiram of Naphtali
- Stefan Gubser as Abiathar

== Production ==
The film was shot in Morocco.

== See also ==
- 1997 in American television
- List of foreign films shot in Morocco
