= Raffaele Mertes =

Italian film director (born 1959)

- Born: 1959 (age 66–67)
- Occupation: Italian film director
- Notable work: Giuseppe di Nazareth, 2000

Raffaele Mertes (born 1959) is an Italian film director. He began as a cinematographer, with his first work being on the 1982 film Un gusto molto particolare. His first film as director was the made-for-TV biblical film Ester in 1998.

== Filmography ==
- Esther (1999)
- Joseph of Nazareth (Giuseppe di Nazareth, 2000)
- Mary Magdalene (Maria Maddalena, 2000)
- The Apocalypse (San Giovanni - L'apocalisse, 2000)
- Judas (Giuda, 2001)
- Thomas (Tommaso, 2001)
