= Arsenio Hall =

American comedian, actor and TV host (born 1956)

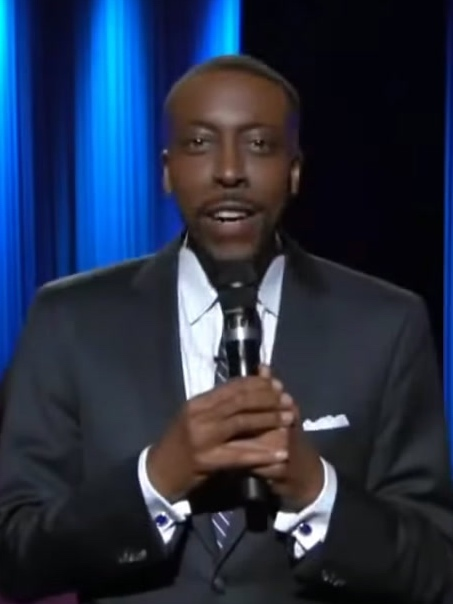
- Hall in 2014
- Born: February 12, 1956 (age 70); Cleveland, Ohio, U.S.
- Education: Kent State University
- Occupations: Comedian; actor; talk show host
- Years active: 1981–present
- Partner: Cheryl Bonacci (1987–2002)
- Children: 1
- Website: arseniohall.com

Arsenio Hall (born February 12, 1956) is an American comedian, actor and talk show host. He hosted a late-night talk show, The Arsenio Hall Show, from 1989 until 1994, and again from 2013 to 2014.

He has appeared in Martial Law, Coming to America (1988), Coming 2 America (2021), and Harlem Nights (1989). He was also the host of Star Search and appeared as Alan Thicke's sidekick on the talk show Thicke of the Night.

In 2012, he won NBC's reality-competition game show The Celebrity Apprentice 5.

== Early life ==
Hall was born on February 12, 1956, in Cleveland, Ohio. His parents are Fred and Annie Hall. His father was a Baptist minister. Hall performed as a magician when he was a child. He graduated from Warrensville Heights High School in Warrensville Heights, Ohio, in 1973, after briefly attending John F. Kennedy High School. He later attended Ohio University and Kent State University.

== Career ==
Hall later moved to Chicago, and then Los Angeles, to pursue a career in comedy, making his television debut on Soul!, and a couple of appearances on Soul Train. In 1984, he was the announcer/sidekick for Alan Thicke during the short-lived talk show Thicke of the Night (a role for which he has on occasion noted his confusion with Monty Hall).

He appeared on five weeks of episodes of the short-lived NBC game show Match Game-Hollywood Squares Hour from 1983 to 1984. He was also the original voice of Winston Zeddemore in the animated series The Real Ghostbusters from 1986 to 1987. In 1988, he co-starred in the comedy film Coming to America with Eddie Murphy. During his career, he set up Arsenio Hall Communications in 1987, and then he had signed a two-year, multi-picture agreement with Paramount Pictures to develop films for an exclusive agreement.

=== Talk shows ===
In 1986, the Fox network introduced The Late Show Starring Joan Rivers, created to directly challenge The Tonight Show Starring Johnny Carson. After a moderate start, ratings for the show sagged. Relations between Rivers and network executives at Fox quickly eroded, and she left in 1987. The series was subsequently renamed The Late Show, and featured several interim hosts, including Ross Shafer, Suzanne Somers, Shawn Thompson, Richard Belzer and Robert Townsend, before it was canceled in 1988. Hall was also chosen to host the show in the fall of 1987, and his stint proved immensely popular, leading to his being offered his own show in syndication.

From January 2, 1989, to May 27, 1994, he had a Paramount contract to host a nationwide syndicated late-night talk show, The Arsenio Hall Show. It was a breakout success, rating especially high among the coveted younger demographic, and it was known for its audience's distinctive alternative to applause in chanting, "Woof, woof, woof!" (which originated in the Cleveland Browns' Dawg Pound in the east end zone) while pumping their fists. The practice soon became such a ritual that by 1991 it had become a "pop culture stamp of approval"—one that Hall said had become "so popular it's getting on people's nerves". The gesture was so well known that it appeared in films such as Pretty Woman and The Hard Way.

He also had a rivalry with Jay Leno after the latter was named host of The Tonight Show, during which Hall said that he would "kick Jay's ass" in ratings.

==== Support of gay rights and the fight against AIDS ====
Hall was a supporter of gay rights long before the movement had become overwhelmingly popular and supported in the mainstream, especially in black culture. In the early 1990s, this culminated in an episode of The Arsenio Hall Show where Hall was protested by gay rights activists, who criticized that he didn't have any gay guests on the show and that he would occasionally play gay characters; Hall was clearly upset by the accusation, saying he had famously put gay celebrities on his show, including Elton John, and had others on who preferred not to publicly advocate their sexual orientation. After passionately stating his points, Hall received overwhelming woof chants of support from his audience. Additionally, Hall used his fame during this period to help fight worldwide prejudice against HIV/AIDS after Magic Johnson contracted the virus. Hall and Johnson filmed a public service announcement about the disease that aired in the early 1990s.

=== Other television and radio work ===
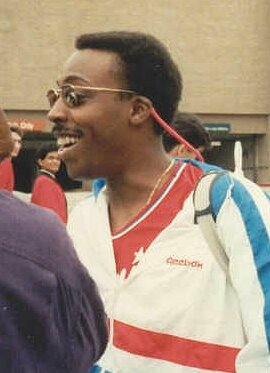
Hall at the 1989 Emmy Awards

Between 1988 and 1991, Hall hosted the MTV Video Music Awards. Over the years, he has appeared as a guest on numerous talk shows, in special features, as a voice actor, on game shows and other award shows. Since The Arsenio Hall Show ended, Hall had leading roles on television shows such as the short-lived sitcom Arsenio (1997) and Martial Law with Sammo Hung (1998–2000), and hosted the revival of Star Search (2003–2004). While hosting Star Search, he popularized the catchphrase "Hit me with the digits!"

Hall appeared as himself in Chappelle's Show in March 2004 (convinced by Swedish comedy director Saman Khadiri) when Chappelle was imagining "what Arsenio is doing right now" in a dinner scene. Hall has guest co-hosted Wednesday evenings on The Tim Conway Jr. Show on KLSX 97.1 FM radio. He hosted MyNetworkTV's comedic web video show The World's Funniest Moments and TV One's 100 Greatest Black Power Moves. He also appeared on Real Time with Bill Maher in May 2012, in a discussion commemorating the 1992 Los Angeles riots.

Hall was considered for the host of the syndicated version of Deal or No Deal and filmed a pilot (there were six taped). However, by the time the syndicated series began on September 8, 2008, Howie Mandel was chosen as host.

Hall also appeared regularly on The Jay Leno Show, and was a guest on Lopez Tonight. George Lopez credits Arsenio as the reason he had a late night show; Lopez appeared on The Arsenio Hall Show more times than any other comedian. Lopez requested Hall be a co-host on Lopez Tonight (November 25, 2009) since he regarded Hall as his inspiration and the first "late night party show host". Hall has filled in as guest host for NBC's Access Hollywood Live (2011) and CNN's evening talk/interview program Piers Morgan Tonight in 2012.

In 2012, Hall was a contestant on the fifth edition of The Celebrity Apprentice, which began airing February 19, 2012. Hall represented his charity, the Magic Johnson Foundation, which is dedicated to advancing economic and social equality by engaging minorities in every aspect of their communities; increasing academic and innovative achievement; and raising HIV/AIDS awareness, treatment and prevention. While Hall clashed with Aubrey O'Day, he befriended a majority of the cast. On May 20, 2012, in the live season finale, he was chosen as the Celebrity Apprentice winner, being "hired" by Donald Trump over the other celebrity finalist, singer Clay Aiken. For winning The Celebrity Apprentice, Hall won the $250,000 grand prize for his charity, in addition to money for the tasks he and his team performed when he was a team leader.

A revival of Hall's syndicated late-night talk show, The Arsenio Hall Show, premiered September 9, 2013, on Tribune owned stations and other networks via CBS Television Distribution. It was canceled after one season due to low ratings. The last taping aired May 30, 2014.

Arsenio appeared in a bit in the January 2024 Emmys.

== Personal life ==
In 1997, after being out of the public eye for three years, Hall gave an interview to dispel rumors regarding what had driven him off stage. "I went on the Internet," he said, "and read I was in detox at Betty Ford. I got online under a fake name and typed in, 'I know Arsenio better than anyone else and he's not in detox, you idiots!'"

Hall has one son, born in 1999. Hall says he took time off to raise his son before resuming The Arsenio Hall Show in 2013. Hall had an interest in returning to the business eventually, but his decision was not confirmed until he appeared on Lopez Tonight in 2009 (although he initially considered a weekend show because he did not want to compete in ratings against his friend George Lopez).

On May 5, 2016, Hall filed a $5 million defamation lawsuit against Sinéad O'Connor after she claimed he had fueled Prince's drug habit and had also spiked his drink at a party at Eddie Murphy's house. Hall dropped the lawsuit after O'Connor apologized and retracted her allegations.

== Filmography ==
=== Film ===
List of film performances
Year	Title	Role	Notes
1987	Amazon Women on the Moon	Apartment Victim	
1988	Coming to America	Semmi, Extremely Ugly Girl, Morris, Reverend Brown	
1989	Harlem Nights	Reggie (The Crying Man)	
1989	Paula Abdul: Straight Up	Himself	Music video
1994	Blankman	Himself	
2005	The Naked Brothers Band: The Movie	Himself	
2005	The Proud Family Movie	Dr. Carver, Bobby Proud	
2006	Scooby-Doo! Pirates Ahoy!	Captain Crothers	
2007	Heckler	Himself	
2008	Igor	Carl Cristall	
2009	Black Dynamite	Tasty Freeze	
2017	Gilbert	Himself	
2017	Sandy Wexler	Himself	
2021	Coming 2 America	Semmi, Morris, Reverend Brown, Baba (witch doctor), Extremely Ugly Girl (archival footage)	
2025	Being Eddie	Himself	Documentary

=== Television ===
List of television performances
Year	Title	Role	Notes	Refs
1981, 1989	Soul Train	Himself	2 episodes	
1982	Madame's Place	Himself		
1982	Elvira's Movie Macabre	Dr. Mustapha Abdul Raheem Jamaal X Muhammad, Tyrone		
1983	The 1/2 Hour Comedy Hour	Host		
1983–1984	Match Game-Hollywood Squares Hour	Celebrity panelist		
1983–1984	Thicke of the Night	Actor / Himself (1984)		
1985	The Motown Revue Starring Smokey Robinson	Regular		
1985	New Love, American Style	Actor		
1986	The New Alfred Hitchcock Presents	Cleavon	Episode titled Happy Birthday air date March 23, 1986	
1986–1987	The Real Ghostbusters	Winston Zeddemore, Mooglie	seasons 1–3	
1987	Uptown Comedy Express	Himself		
1987	Comedy Club	Himself		
1987–1988	The Late Show	Host		
1986-1988	Solid Gold	Himself		
1989	Comic Relief III	Himself		
1989–1994	The Arsenio Hall Show	Host	Also writer and producer	
1990	Doogie Howser, M.D.	Himself		
1990	Cheers	Himself		
1992	Ebony/Jet Showcase	Himself		
1992	The Jackie Thomas Show	Himself	Ep. "The Joke"	
1993	Blossom	Himself		
1994	Living Single	Himself		
1997	Arsenio	Michael Atwood		
1997	Behind the Music	Himself	Ep. "MC Hammer: Behind the Music #2"	
1997	Muppets Tonight	Guest	Ep. "The Cameo Show"	
1998	Intimate Portrait	Narrator		
1998–2000	Martial Law	Terrell Parker	36 episodes	
2000	The Norm Show	Joe	Episode titled Norm vs. the Kid air date December 8, 2000	
2002–2003	Hollywood Squares	Celebrity panel		
2003–2004	Star Search	Host		
2003	Tinseltown TV	Himself		
2004	CBS Cares	Himself	PSA	
2008–2009	The World's Funniest Moments	Host		
2009–2010	The Jay Leno Show	Correspondent		
2009	Brothers	Himself		
2012	The Celebrity Apprentice 5	Contestant	Winner of competition	
2013–2014	The Arsenio Hall Show	Host	Also producer	
2015–2016	Real Husbands of Hollywood	Himself - Guest star		
2016	Greatest Hits	Host		
2017–2018	The Mayor	Ocho Okoye	Guest; 2 episodes	
2018	All About the Washingtons	Himself	Guest; 2 episodes	
2025	Crutch	Avery	Ep. "Community Crutch"	

List of biography television shows and specials
Year	Title	Episode	Notes	Refs
1996–2008	Biography		5 episodes	
2001	E! True Hollywood Story			
2008	Pioneers of Television (PBS)			
2012	American Masters			

Guest appearances on talk shows
Year	Title	Episode	Notes	Refs
1989, 1992	Live! with Regis and Kathie Lee	Guest	2 episodes	
1989	The Phil Donahue Show	Himself		
1991	The Howard Stern Show	Guest		
1996–2012	The Tonight Show with Jay Leno	Guest	Multiple appearances	
1997	The Rosie O'Donnell Show	Guest		
1997	The Chris Rock Show	Guest		
1998	The Magic Hour	Guest		
2003	Real Time with Bill Maher	Guest		
2004	Tavis Smiley	Guest		
2004	The Sharon Osbourne Show	Guest		
2004	Chappelle's Show	Guest		
2004	The Wayne Brady Show	Guest		
2009	Up Close with Carrie Keagan	Guest		
2009	Made in Hollywood	Himself		
2010, 2012	Late Night with Jimmy Fallon	Alternate Reality Host	2 episodes	
2010, 2012	Chelsea Lately	Guest (2010) / Soundtrack (2012)		
2010	Tosh.0	Guest		
2011	Lopez Tonight	Guest		
2011	Access Hollywood Live	Guest Host		
2012	Inside Edition	Himself		
2012	The Wendy Williams Show	Himself		
2012	Piers Morgan Tonight	Guest Host		

== Discography ==
=== As "Chunky A" ===
- Large and in Charge (1989)

== Awards and nominations ==
=== NAACP Image Awards ===
The NAACP Image Awards are awarded annually by the National Association for the Advancement of Colored People (NAACP). Hall has won 3 awards from 4 nominations, as well as an honorary award.

Year	Award	Nominated work	Result
1988	Outstanding Supporting Actor in a Motion Picture	Coming to America	Won
1991	Key of Life Award	Himself	Honored
1993	Outstanding Variety – Series or Special	The Arsenio Hall Show	Won
1995	Outstanding Variety Series	The Arsenio Hall Show	Won
2014	Outstanding Talk Series	The Arsenio Hall Show	Nominated

=== Primetime Emmy Awards ===
The Primetime Emmy Awards are awarded annually by the Academy of Television Arts & Sciences. Hall has received 2 nominations.

Year	Award	Nominated work	Result
1989	Outstanding Variety, Music or Comedy Program	The Arsenio Hall Show	Nominated
1990	Outstanding Variety, Music or Comedy Program	The Arsenio Hall Show	Nominated

=== Miscellaneous awards and nominations ===
Year	Organization	Award	Nominated work	Result
1989	American Comedy Award	Funniest Supporting Actor in a Motion Picture	Coming to America	Won
1990	American Comedy Award	Funniest Male Performer in a TV Series (Leading Role) Network, Cable or Syndication	The Arsenio Hall Show	Nominated
1990	People's Choice Award	Favorite Late Night Talk Show Host	The Arsenio Hall Show	Won
1990	Soul Train Award	Sammy Davis Jr. Award for Entertainer of the Year	Himself	Honored
1990	Hollywood Walk of Fame	Star at 6776 Hollywood Blvd.	Himself	Inducted
1992	Central State University	Honorary Doctor of Humane Letters degree	Himself	Honored
1993	GMA Dove Award	Outstanding Mainstream Contribution Award	Himself	Honored
2014	People's Choice Award	Favorite New Talk Show Host	The Arsenio Hall Show	Nominated
