= The Apprentice (American TV series) season 12 =

The Apprentice
- Season 12
- No. of contestants: 18
- Winner: Arsenio Hall
- Runner-up: Clay Aiken
- No. of episodes: 14

Release
- Original network: NBC
- Original release: February 19 – May 20, 2012

Season chronology
- ← Previous; Season 11 Next → Season 13

The Celebrity Apprentice 5 (also known as The Apprentice 12) is the fifth installment of the reality game show The Celebrity Apprentice. On May 15, 2011, NBC announced that the show would be returning for a fifth season in 2012. The following day, at NBC's annual upfront presentations to advertisers, Donald Trump confirmed that he would be hosting the fifth season. On January 4, 2012, Trump officially announced the cast on Today and NBC issued a press release with more details. On January 13, 2012, NBC announced the fifth season would premiere February 19, 2012, and would be the first season to air each week's finale live. The network announced that it would air a one-hour version of the previous week's episode prior to the airing of new episodes on February 26 and March 4 at 8 p.m.

== Candidates ==
Celebrity	Background	Original team	Age	Hometown	Charity	Result	Raised
Arsenio Hall	Comedian, actor & talk show host	Unanimous	55	Warrensville Heights, Ohio	Magic Johnson Foundation	Hired as The Celebrity Apprentice (5–20–2012)	$522,100
Clay Aiken	Singer-songwriter & activist	Unanimous	33	Raleigh, North Carolina	National Inclusion Project	Fired in the season finale (5–20–2012)	$361,500
Aubrey O'Day	Danity Kane singer & actress	Forte	27	La Quinta, California	Gay, Lesbian and Straight Education Network	Fired in task 14 (5–13–2012)	$50,000
Lisa Lampanelli	Comedian	Forte	50	Trumbull, Connecticut	Gay Men's Health Crisis	Fired in task 14 (5–13–2012)	$130,000
Teresa Giudice	The Real Housewives of New Jersey star	Forte	39	Paterson, New Jersey	The NephCure Foundation	Fired in task 13 (5–06–2012)	$70,000
Dayana Mendoza	Miss Universe 2008	Forte	25	Caracas, Venezuela	Latino Commission on AIDS	Fired in task 12 (4–29–2012)	$30,000
Penn Jillette	Magician	Unanimous	56	Greenfield, Massachusetts	Opportunity Village	Fired in task 11 (4–22–2012)	$50,000
Paul Teutul Sr.	American Chopper star	Unanimous	62	Pearl River, New York	Make-A-Wish Foundation	Fired in task 10 (4–15–2012)	$494,082
Lou Ferrigno	Actor & retired professional bodybuilder	Unanimous	60	Brooklyn, New York	Muscular Dystrophy Association	Fired in task 9 (4–08–2012)	$50,000
Dee Snider	Twisted Sister singer	Unanimous	56	Baldwin, New York	March of Dimes	Fired in task 8 (4–01–2012)	$326,000
Debbie Gibson	Singer-songwriter & actress	Forte	41	Merrick, New York	Children International	Fired in task 7 (4–01–2012)	$50,000
Patricia Velasquez	Model, actress & philanthropist	Forte	40	Maracaibo, Venezuela	The Wayuu Taya Foundation	Fired in task 6 (3–25–2012)	
Tia Carrere	Actress, singer & model	Forte	45	Honolulu, Hawaii	After-School All-Stars	Fired in task 5 (3–18–2012)	
Michael Andretti	IZOD IndyCar Series team owner	Unanimous	49	Bethlehem, Pennsylvania	Racing for Cancer	Fired in task 4 (3–11–2012)	
Adam Carolla	Comedian, actor & podcaster	Unanimous	47	Studio City, California	Catholic Big Brothers Big Sisters	Fired in task 4 (3–11–2012)	
George Takei	Former Star Trek actor	Unanimous	74	Los Angeles, California	Japanese American National Museum	Fired in task 3 (3–04–2012)	
Victoria Gotti	Reality television star & author	Forte	48	Howard Beach, New York	Association to Benefit Children	Fired in task 2 (2–26–2012)	
Cheryl Tiegs	Supermodel	Forte	64	Alhambra, California	The Farrah Fawcett Foundation	Fired in task 1 (2–19–2012)	

== Weekly results ==
Candidate	Original team	Task 8 team	Task 10 team	Final Task team	Application result	Record as project manager
Arsenio Hall	Unanimous	Unanimous	Unanimous	Unanimous	The Celebrity Apprentice	2–0 (win in tasks 8 & 12)
Clay Aiken	Unanimous	Unanimous	Forte	Forte	Fired in the season finale	1–1 (win in task 6, loss in task 11)
Aubrey O'Day	Forte	Unanimous	Unanimous	Forte	Fired in task 14	1–1 (win in task 11, loss in task 6)
Lisa Lampanelli	Forte	Forte	Forte	Unanimous	Fired in task 14	2–1 (win in tasks 10 & 13, loss in task 2)
Teresa Giudice	Forte	Unanimous	Unanimous	Unanimous	Fired in task 13	1–2 (win in task 9, loss in tasks 7 & 13)
Dayana Mendoza	Forte	Forte	Forte		Fired in task 12	1–2 (win in task 3, loss in tasks 9 & 12)
Penn Jillette	Unanimous	Forte	Forte	Forte	Fired in task 11	1–0 (win in task 2)
Paul Teutul Sr.	Unanimous	Unanimous	Unanimous	Unanimous	Fired in task 10	1–1 (win in task 1, loss in task 10)
Lou Ferrigno	Unanimous	Forte			Fired in task 9	1–1 (win in task 5, loss in task 8)
Dee Snider	Unanimous	Forte		Forte	Fired in task 8	1–0 (win in task 7)
Debbie Gibson	Forte			Forte	Fired in task 7	1–0 (win in task 4)
Patricia Velásquez	Forte				Fired in task 6	0–1 (loss in task 1)
Tia Carrere	Forte				Fired in task 5	0–1 (loss in task 5)
Michael Andretti	Unanimous				Fired in task 4	
Adam Carolla	Unanimous			Unanimous	Fired in task 4	0–1 (loss in task 4)
George Takei	Unanimous				Fired in task 3	0–1 (loss in task 3)
Victoria Gotti	Forte				Fired in task 2	
Cheryl Tiegs	Forte				Fired in task 1	

Elimination chart
No.	Candidate	1	2	3	4	5	6	7	8	9	10	11	12	13	14	15
1	Arsenio	IN	IN	BR	BR	IN	IN	IN	WIN	IN	IN	IN	WIN	IN	IN	CA
2	Clay	IN	IN	IN	BR	IN	WIN	IN	IN	IN	IN	LOSE	IN	IN	IN	FIRED
3	Aubrey	IN	IN	IN	IN	IN	LOSE	IN	IN	IN	BR	WIN	IN	IN	FIRED	
4	Lisa	IN	LOSE	IN	IN	IN	IN	IN	IN	BR	WIN	IN	IN	WIN	FIRED	
5	Teresa	IN	IN	IN	IN	IN	IN	LOSE	IN	WIN	BR	IN	IN	FIRED		
6	Dayana	IN	BR	WIN	IN	IN	BR	BR	BR	LOSE	IN	BR	FIRED			
7	Penn	IN	WIN	IN	BR	IN	IN	IN	IN	IN	IN	FIRED				
8	Paul	WIN	IN	IN	BR	IN	IN	IN	IN	IN	FIRED					
9	Lou	IN	IN	BR	BR	WIN	IN	IN	LOSE	FIRED						
10	Dee	IN	IN	IN	BR	IN	IN	WIN	FIRED							
11	Debbie	IN	IN	IN	WIN	IN	IN	FIRED								
12	Patricia	LOSE	IN	IN	IN	IN	FIRED									
13	Tia	IN	IN	IN	IN	FIRED										
14	Michael	IN	IN	IN	FIRED											
15	Adam	IN	IN	IN	FIRED											
16	George	IN	IN	FIRED												
17	Victoria	BR	FIRED													
18	Cheryl	FIRED														

The candidate was on the losing team.
The candidate won the competition and was named the Celebrity Apprentice.
The candidate won as project manager on his/her team.
The candidate lost as project manager on his/her team.
The candidate was on the losing team and brought to the final boardroom.
The candidate was fired.
The candidate lost as project manager and was fired.
The candidate did not participate in the task.

== Episodes ==
=== Episode 1: Hero Worship ===
Task 1

- Airdate: February 19, 2012
- Task sponsor: CafeMetro
- Task scope: Teams must run a delicatessen and sell sandwiches for as much money as possible.
- Unanimous project manager: Paul Teutul Sr.
- Forte project manager: Patricia Velásquez
- Judges: Donald Trump; Ivanka Trump; Donald Trump Jr.
- Results:
  - The men of Unanimous went with a theme to highlight project manager Paul Teutul Sr.'s television show, American Chopper. They used Penn Jillette as a carnival barker to attract customers and gain profit. While the men struggled to funnel people into their deli and didn't have a significant amount of large donations, Clay Aiken was able to upsell their sandwiches and make more money.
  - The women of Forte put on a celebrity lounge/red carpet theme at their deli and Patricia Velásquez called in multiple people to bring in money for her charity. They utilized Debbie Gibson's singing talents to attract customers while Teresa Giudice and Aubrey O'Day also brought in people to donate money. In particular, Dayana Mendoza was able to get top-dollar donations from some of her contacts.
- Dramatic tension: Victoria Gotti seemed too detached from the task in the very beginning, making personal phone calls to her children and not bringing in donors. She was also an hour late into the opening day, but cited that she had a torn cornea. Cheryl Tiegs seemed to be working at the slowest pace, which also irritated her teammates. George Takei was also working at a slower pace than his team was, which caused friction between him and Paul Teutul Sr. The men's team hesitantly held out on their contacts, figuring that they could use them for their own benefit and believing that Paul would follow through on his outrageous claim of pulling in half a million dollars. While he did not meet his initial goal, Paul had a donor who wrote a check that was more than double of what the women even made.
- Winning team: Unanimous
  - Reasons for win: Paul pulled in $305,000 from an unknown contact. They also received a bonus check of $35,000 after Rachael Ray judged the teams' sandwiches and she preferred their sandwich over Forte's. Altogether, they made a total profit of $367,120.
- Losing team: Forte
  - Reasons for loss: Despite having a number of high-profile contacts follow through with multiple donations varying in thousands of dollars, the women were all outmatched by Paul's single donor. They only made $126,962.
  - Sent to boardroom: Patricia Velásquez, Cheryl Tiegs, Victoria Gotti
- Fired: Cheryl Tiegs – for her insignificant contributions and admitting that she did not fit into the environment of The Apprentice. In addition to her questionable desire to continue on the show, Cheryl also acknowledged that she held out on her contacts so that she could use them for her own purposes. While Victoria Gotti also admitted that she held out on her contacts and was called out by her teammates for her lackluster performance, it was concluded that Victoria would be a stronger resource for the women if she was more focused and attentive in the tasks.
- Notes:
  - Paul Teutul Sr. won $494,082 for his charity. This broke the record for the most money earned during the first task in a Celebrity Apprentice season.
  - Cameo appearances by Carol Alt, Wyclef Jean, Rachael Ray, Andy Cohen, Russell Simmons, David Vanacore
  - Marco Andretti, INDYCAR driver for Andretti Autosport, withdrew from the competition as a result of the death of Dan Wheldon at the 2011 IZOD IndyCar World Championship at Las Vegas Motor Speedway, which was earlier in the week that taping commenced, and a death on his mother's side of the family. His father Michael was the replacement, and joined midway through the task.
  - Paul's donor accounted for over 80% of the men's revenue. Without it, and the bonus check from Rachael Ray, the team made just $27,120.
  - Despite the loss, Patricia Velásquez was universally praised by the women for being a superb project manager and not one of them said that she deserved to be fired. When brought back to the boardroom, even both Cheryl Tiegs and Victoria Gotti admitted they would not fire Patricia.
  - Aubrey O'Day asked Trump if he could allow Patricia to keep her earnings, given that Patricia brought a majority of Forte's money, but Trump refused.
  - When discussing her performance in the initial boardroom, Tia Carrere told Patricia that it would be "OK" if she brought her back to the boardroom if they lost, which perturbed Trump. When confronted about her comment after the results were revealed, Tia explained that she made the remark because she knew she could defend herself in the boardroom. Unfortunately, Trump felt it was a very foolish thing to say and Ivanka deemed it flippant.
  - After being dismissed from the boardroom, Victoria argued with Trump over her being a hard worker.

=== Episode 2: Getting Medieval ===
Task 2

- Airdate: February 26, 2012
- Task sponsor: Medieval Times
- Task scope: The celebrities must create an original 12–15 minute show for Medieval Times that would be performed in front of a live audience in Lyndhurst, New Jersey. Teams will be judged by an audience vote based on entertainment value, creativity, and overall presentation. Teams will be riding horses for the performance.
- Unanimous project manager: Penn Jillette
- Forte project manager: Lisa Lampanelli
- Judges: Donald Trump; James Lipton; Donald Trump Jr.
- Results:
  - Unanimous made a show that incorporated each team member's profession. Penn Jillette and Arsenio Hall served as hosts while George Takei was the narrator. Lou Ferrigno played a leading role and Paul Teutul Sr. played his opponent. Dee Snider dressed in drag as the princess, while Clay Aiken played his troubadour.
  - Forte created a show that was centered on a spoof of The Real Housewives of New Jersey, with Teresa Giudice recreating the moment from the show where she angrily flipped over a table. The women also incorporated a parody of Snooki from the Jersey Shore into their show. With Lisa Lampanelli portraying Sir Donald of Trump, the remaining women portrayed "real housewives" who were fighting for his affection.
- Dramatic tension: Lisa Lampanelli became overwhelmed with her teammates after they started to go in different directions with the project and she subsequently ruled with an iron fist after the women continuously interrupted her. Victoria Gotti was very resentful of being given a behind-the-scenes role as the creative director and she even threatened to leave the women's team at one point and join the men, where she felt she would be more appreciated. Dayana Mendoza also felt shut out by Lisa and Aubrey O'Day (who was placed as Lisa's second in command) when Lisa forbid her teammates to abruptly interject in the creative process of their show. The women also had a technical malfunction during their performance when Victoria missed a cue for the trumpet. On the men's team, George Takei fumbled on the script during the dress rehearsal and Dee Snider broke one of his fingers after he fell off the horse and got his hand tangled in the saddle. While the EMT recommended that he be hospitalized, Dee refused to withdraw from the task and carried out his role in the show.
- Winning team: Unanimous
  - Reasons for win: While the men did not have a solid plot, their show appealed to a much wider audience because they played into each team member's strengths, with Clay Aiken singing during the show and having Paul Teutul Sr. having a motorcycle instead of a horse. Overall, the men received 558 votes from the audience.
- Losing team: Forte
  - Reasons for loss: Even though their show catered to modern pop culture and paid homage to New Jersey, it was deduced that the theme was too narrow and that it did not appeal to families or children. They only received 363 votes from the audience.
  - Sent to boardroom: Lisa Lampanelli, Victoria Gotti, Dayana Mendoza
- Fired: Victoria Gotti – for faulting on the sound production and letting her emotions hinder her performance. While Lisa Lampanelli was ultimately responsible for the loss after taking accountability for the concept and was criticized for bringing back Dayana Mendoza instead of Aubrey O'Day (who had made a majority of the creative decisions), Lisa made a compelling and emotional case as to why she should stay since Victoria had threatened to quit the team and help the men. This, along with Dayana's testimony that Lisa was a harder worker, sealed Victoria's fate.
- Notes:
  - Penn Jillette won $40,000 for his charity.
  - James Lipton, famous for his work on Inside the Actors Studio, filled in for Ivanka on this task. In the boardroom, Lipton acknowledged how impressed he was with both teams and how hard the cast worked throughout the task. He also paid respects to both teams for a job well done.
  - Adam Carolla did not participate in this week's task due to a previous engagement.
  - During the women's show, Debbie Gibson's pants were down (exposing her underwear) and Tia Carrere's breast was accidentally exposed.
  - When pressed by Trump about who he would bring back to the boardroom if Unanimous lost, Penn Jillette said he would bring back Lou Ferrigno and George Takei because he didn't think that they would be useful in tasks that did not involve an acting element. Lou was insulted by this statement and accused Penn of being on a power trip. By contrast, George said that while he didn't agree with Penn's reasoning, he respected his honesty over the matter.
  - In the final boardroom, Lisa Lampanelli pointed out that Victoria Gotti not only missed important cues during the women's show, but she couldn't even spell the word "medieval" correctly (spelling it "mid-evil" when she was doing research on the internet and America Online) even though she was an established writer and had the stationery for Medieval Times in plain sight.

=== Episode 3: How Much is That Celebrity in the Window? ===
Task 3

- Airdate: March 4, 2012
- Task sponsors: Ivanka Trump / Lord & Taylor
- Task scope: Teams must create two themed living window displays for Ivanka Trump's clothing and accessory line. The celebrities would be judged by Ivanka herself and Scott (a representative manager for Lord & Taylor) for creativity, brand messaging, and overall display.
- Unanimous project manager: George Takei
- Forte project manager: Dayana Mendoza
- Judges: Donald Trump; Eric Trump; Donald Trump Jr.
- Results:
  - Unanimous created a display based on a day and night theme that included twin models to showcase a transformation between two different looks in the collection: a professional by day and elegant by night.
  - Forte built a design around a timeless theme which illustrated the designs coming to life in the windows. Their sets incorporated a clock and prominently featured the signature color of the collection, coral.
- Winning team: Forte
  - Reasons for win: The women applied a stronger concept of a living window and appealed to the appropriate demographics with their displays. They used tasteful clothing in their windows and also wore Ivanka's fashion during their presentation. While the plan to include actual photos of the collection was thrown out due to an error with the printing company, Aubrey O'Day quickly came up with a back-up plan to model the clothes as if they were the designer themselves. Their presentation was much more refined than the men's and they also got brownie points for incorporating Ivanka's jewelry as well.
- Losing team: Unanimous
  - Reasons for loss: The men were praised for using the twins as a transition for the windows and the judges loved the professional signage (created by Paul Teutul Sr.), but Ivanka and Scott felt that their living windows were not as creative and risky. Their second window was washed out by the dark, midnight blue background. In addition, Ivanka felt that the clothes in the second window were not consistent with nighttime fashion.
  - Sent to boardroom: George Takei, Arsenio Hall, Lou Ferrigno
- Fired: George Takei – for being most at fault for the loss and having little authority throughout the task as project manager. While Arsenio Hall took complete responsibility for his selections of the clothing and practically made allowances for his termination, George was ultimately dismissed after he accepted the fact that he dropped the ball with several aspects of the project.
- Notes:
  - Dayana Mendoza won $20,000 for her charity.
  - Teresa Giudice initially wanted to become project manager for this task, but it was Dayana who was ultimately assigned after she stepped up and was supported by Debbie Gibson and Patricia Velásquez.
  - Dee Snider (who injured his finger in the previous task) required immediate surgery and was subsequently absent for most of the task. While it was doubted if he could continue in the competition, Dee did not withdraw from the show and was present for the boardroom. He was also ruled out of being brought back for the final boardroom after the results were revealed.
  - Clay Aiken was called out by Eric Trump after he praised George Takei's leadership, even though Clay had been seen giggling when Eric came for a status report.
  - Despite being grilled by the Trumps on who should be fired if Forte lost, none of the women cited anyone in particular and they all refused to answer who was responsible for any flaws in the task.

=== Episode 4: Failure to Launch ===
Task 4

- Airdate: March 11, 2012
- Task sponsors: General Motors / Buick
- Task scope: The celebrities must create a 10-minute sponsorship presentation, as well as a 10-minute Q&A session for the Buick Verano. Teams will present in front of a live audience and online viewers, and will be judged on informative content, brand messaging, and overall creativity.
- Unanimous project manager: Adam Carolla
- Forte project manager: Debbie Gibson
- Judges: Donald Trump; Ivanka Trump; Donald Trump Jr.
- Results:
  - Unanimous had a presentation that used comedy as a platform for promoting the car's features. It included Adam Carolla discussing the Buick Verano with Michael Andretti, while the remaining team members served as hecklers who challenged Adam's knowledge of the vehicle. Penn Jillette also demonstrated how large the trunk was by fitting himself inside.
  - Forte made a presentation that resembled a casting call, while having different team members represent a key feature of the Buick Verano. Tia Carrere played host while Debbie Gibson and Lisa Lampanelli also had substantial parts of the show. Aubrey O'Day fabricated an emotionally motivating story for her part of the presentation and Teresa Giudice brought out her family in her role of the performance.
- Dramatic tension: The men became concerned after Adam Carolla wanted to headline their presentation with a humorous approach, even though the executives did not seem welcoming to the idea. They were also fed up with Lou Ferrigno and continued to marginalize him as they did in the past. Debbie Gibson felt that Aubrey O'Day was overbearing in the beginning of the task, while Aubrey herself felt that Debbie was indecisive and relying on gimmicks to get through the show. Tia Carrere, Teresa Giudice, & Dayana Mendoza were frustrated that they were marginalized by Debbie out of the creativity.
- Winning team: Forte
  - Reasons for win: The women effectively carried out the core values of the Buick Verano and addressed all four key features in an entertaining performance. Even though they stumbled on the first question in their Q&A session, the executives loved how they personalized their presentation with Debbie Gibson's singing and Lisa Lampanelli's humor. Despite slip-ups from Aubrey O'Day on the product name and inconsistencies with brand messaging and an overall theme, the sponsors felt that the women's show was superior.
- Losing team: Unanimous
  - Reasons for loss: The Buick company wanted Michael Andretti to sell cars. When he wasn't going to be the spokesperson it didn't really matter who was in charge or what kind of job they did.
  - Sent to boardroom: All of Unanimous. - After Adam refused to pick two people to bring back with him, Trump decided to fire two people and then sent out Unanimous for an internal review. This is the second time the entire team is brought back to the final boardroom after Season 2, and was the first time in Apprentice history where an entire team (other than the minimal two, three, or four remaining candidates) were sent out for an internal review and then called back for a final boardroom.
  - Firing verdict: Immediately after firing Adam, the Trumps confronted Michael for not putting himself forward as the leader for the task. While Lou Ferrigno was condemned by nearly his entire team for being the weakest link (Arsenio Hall being the only dissenter, saying that Michael should be fired because his name was the team's most powerful asset, and he failed to properly exploit it), Michael failed to make a convincing case for himself and was fired.
  - Fired: Adam Carolla and Michael Andretti for the following reasons:
  - Adam Carolla - for no leadership ability, refusing to bring back two teammates, taking complete responsibility for losing the task, and ultimately because Michael Andretti wasn't on stage and Buick wanted his image to sell cars.
  - Michael Andretti - for his lack of stage presence during the presentation and not stepping up as project manager. They said this car marketing challenge was "tailored" for him even though Adam Carolla hosts the car show on the speed channel and races vintage cars.
- Notes:
  - Debbie Gibson won $50,000 for her charity.
  - Tia and Teresa were very vocal about being marginalized in the boardroom, especially after Debbie mentioned they would be the two who would be brought back if the women lost.
  - In an interview during the women's dress rehearsal, Aubrey O'Day admitted that she was not familiar with Debbie's music and that she was more of a Tiffany fan.
  - Teresa's husband Joe and her daughters Gia, Gabriella, and Milania made cameos in this episode.
  - Adam Carolla was told to do a Steve Jobs type presentation by a member of the production crew. This style has only one person on stage at a time.
  - Adam Carolla suggested that the member of the production crew who told him to do a Steve Jobs type presentation should have been fired.
  - Although the show made it seem like Adam Carolla wanted center stage and to do "potty humor" Adam said that was never his intention and most of what he said was taken completely out of context.
  - The scene where Paul Teutul. was a heckler being dragged off by Lou Ferrigno actually got laughs, contrary to what they edited on The Apprentice. After the dramatic looks and right before the cut away you can hear a tenth of a second of laughs. As soon as this was noticed it was changed in the episode.
  - Adam Carolla's question and answer segment was cut except for one joke.

=== Episode 5: I'm Going to Mop the Floor with You ===
Task 5

- Airdate: March 18, 2012
- Task sponsor: O-Cedar
- Task scope: Teams must develop a viral video for O-Cedar's new Pro-Mist mop. The celebrities will be judged on their video's product integration, entertainment value, and brand messaging.
- Unanimous project manager: Lou Ferrigno
- Forte project manager: Tia Carrere
- Judges: Donald Trump; Eric Trump; Donald Trump Jr.
- Results:
  - Unanimous' commercial was based around the catchphrase that Paul Teutul Sr. created. Dee Snider directed the commercial and it presented Lou Ferrigno using the mop and even dancing with it.
  - Forte's commercial was centered around a risque concept that used mops as a double entendre for sexual partners. They were all featured in the commercial discussing the mop and some of its features.
- Dramatic tension: Even though Lou Ferrigno stepped up to become project manager, his teammates still doubted his ability to perform well. After shooting down a number of Lou's ideas, Penn Jillette was confronted by Clay Aiken for being condescending and cynical. This affected Penn throughout the task and he failed to make amends with Clay after they discussed the incident during the editing phase of their commercial. On the women's team, a clique formed between Debbie Gibson, Lisa Lampanelli, and Aubrey O'Day, and all three were irritated by Tia Carrere after they felt sidelined and ignored during the task. Aubrey and Lisa were also frustrated with Dayana Mendoza's input and they both felt that she was their weakest link.
- Winning team: Unanimous
  - Reasons for win: The men's commercial had a clearer concept and the executives felt they had a stronger tagline. While it was argued that the men could have used more star power in their viral video, the executives were also entertained by Lou Ferrigno and the starring role he had in the video.
- Losing team: Forte
  - Reasons for loss: While the women nailed the entertainment value and brand messaging, their concept was slightly confusing and the executives felt that they focused too much on the presentation, rather than the actual video. It was also conceded that the men had integrated the product more than the women did.
  - Sent to boardroom: No final boardroom – Tia took accountability as project manager for the critical errors made in the task and requested to take the blame for the defeat without Trump having to fire two people, to which he obliged.
- Fired: Tia Carrere – for her poor performance as a leader and making the viral video with an ineffective concept.
- Notes:
  - Lou Ferrigno won $50,000 for his charity.
  - Paul Teutul Sr. did not even know what a viral video was before the task.
  - Aubrey O'Day bad-mouthed Tia Carrere throughout her interviews and went as far to insult Tia's age in the boardroom. Tia fought back by incriminating Aubrey's character when it was discussed that she was the head of her sorority when she was in college.
  - When defending Dayana Mendoza in the boardroom, Patricia Velásquez implicated Teresa Giudice as being the women's weakest team member.

=== Episode 6: Party Like a Mock-star ===
Task 6

- Airdate: March 25, 2012
- Task sponsor: Crystal Light
- Task scope: The celebrities must create a launch party for their selected flavor of Crystal Light Mock-Tails. Teams would be judged on creativity, brand messaging, and the overall atmosphere.
- Unanimous project manager: Clay Aiken
- Forte project manager: Aubrey O'Day
- Judges: Donald Trump; Ivanka Trump; Donald Trump Jr.
- Results:
  - Unanimous picked the Peach Bellini flavor and based their party around a tropical beach theme. Their catchphrase was "Life's a Peach".
  - Forte selected the Pomtini flavor and created a Garden of Eden theme for their event. Their punchline was "Stir Your Healthy Desires".
- Winning team: Unanimous
  - Reasons for win: While the executives were concerned over how the brand messaging was drowned out by the guests attending the party, the men were more engaged and stepped away from the traditional basis of a cocktail party. They created a more entertaining atmosphere than the women did and Clay Aiken also brought in devout fans, high-profile party guests, and even sang during the event.
- Losing team: Forte
  - Reasons for loss: Despite being praised for their creative theme, good punchline, and their successful utilization of Debbie Gibson and Lisa Lampanelli's talents, it was still concluded that they just simply did not have a better setting than the men did. As with the men, it was also discussed that there was a lack of efficient brand messaging at the women's event.
  - Sent to boardroom: Aubrey O'Day, Patricia Velásquez, Dayana Mendoza
- Fired: Patricia Velásquez – for being accountable for the launch party's professional signage, which was the only negative from the women's event. While Aubrey O'Day was the unsuccessful project manager and Dayana Mendoza came under fire for her weak efforts by several of her teammates, the Trumps all held Patricia responsible for the women's defeat.
- Notes:
  - Clay Aiken won $50,000 for his charity.
  - Cameos by Kathie Lee Gifford and Hoda Kotb.
  - Aubrey O'Day became very emotional after failing the task; not only because her team did a great job and seemed to have excellent synergy, but because her charity (which helped campaigns against bullying) would not receive any money. Trump then donated $10,000 for Aubrey's charity due to her tremendous display of passion for her cause.
  - Lisa Lampanelli began to cry after Trump's donation to Aubrey's charity, appreciating the kind gesture and joking that he made that amount of money in 30 seconds.
  - When Aubrey went after Patricia Velásquez and Dayana Mendoza in the boardroom, Trump asked her if she had anything against Venezuela.
  - Even though Dayana brought in several of her friends (who were former beauty queen title holders) to the launch party, she was still accosted by some of her team members for her lackluster contributions. Trump, however, did not hold her accountable for the loss of the task.
  - While Trump held Aubrey at the helm of the women's failure because she was the project manager, Aubrey contested that she played an integral part in every single task and that she was an invaluable team member. Even though Dayana pointed out that her creativity could have been the source of the women's failures, Aubrey still maintained she was a better competitor.

=== Episode 7: Walking Papers ===
Task 7

- Airdate: April 1, 2012
- Task sponsor: Toshiba
- Task scope: Teams must create a celebrity styled guidebook of New York City. The winning team would be selected on whoever earns the most money.
- Unanimous project manager: Dee Snider
- Forte project manager: Teresa Giudice
- Judges: Donald Trump; Ivanka Trump; Donald Trump Jr.
- Dramatic tension: Debbie Gibson was frustrated with Teresa Giudice's leadership and Dayana Mendoza continued to annoy her teammates even though she was trying to help. In particular, Lisa Lampanelli was very angry at Dayana after she tried to incorporate something into their guidebook at the last minute. When the Blue Man Group came to support Penn Jillette and the men's team, their donation went awry after the balloons carrying $8,000 exploded. People started stealing their money and Clay Aiken was outraged by the mob scene created from the event. Arsenio Hall initially had a blank check from Jay Leno to give for the team's total, but it arrived too late for it to be counted, leaving Arsenio without any contributions to the task.
- Winning team: Unanimous
  - Reasons for win: Despite a number of setbacks including failing to win the bonus check from Regis Philbin, losing money from the Blue Man Group, and Arsenio Hall not bringing any donors at all, the men were still able to edge out the women's final total by a mere amount of money, the men's profit was $162,869.
- Losing team: Forte
  - Reasons for loss: Even though it was conceded that the women made a better book, they only lost by 14 dollars, which was the closest deficit in the show's history. Despite a $35,000 bonus check, the women once again came up just short of a victory, with a profit of $162,855 including the bonus check.
  - Sent to boardroom: Teresa Giudice, Dayana Mendoza, Debbie Gibson
- Fired: Debbie Gibson – for raising the least amount of money in the task amongst the women in the boardroom. Even though this was Dayana Mendoza's third appearance in the boardroom and Teresa Guidice failed the task as project manager and did not bring back Aubrey O'Day (who did raise the least amount of money), Trump decided to fire Debbie instead.
- Notes:
  - The total amount of money raised was $325,724, which was rounded to $326,000 for Dee Snider's charity. With this task, the celebrities had collectively raised over $1,000,000 for charity.
  - Cameos from Regis Philbin, Teller, Michael Andretti and the Blue Man Group.
  - Debbie Gibson continued to feud with Teresa Giudice by criticizing her lackluster leadership skills in the boardroom. Teresa responded by belittling Debbie's career and the way she dressed in the boardrooms.
  - In an attempt to prove a point, Debbie inadvertently admitted that she belonged in the boardroom because she did not contribute as much as Dayana Mendoza did, which the Trumps felt was unwise to say and may have been a pivotal point in her dismissal.
  - Despite being persistently deemed the weakest link and the fact that she was derailing her team yet again, Trump still admired Dayana's contributions and the way she handled herself in the boardroom while Debbie and Teresa fought with one another.
  - After being terminated, Debbie gave Dayana a farewell hug, but refused to say goodbye to Teresa.
  - This is the last task to feature the men against the women.

Task 8

- Corporate shuffle: Trump decided to switch the teams up since the women had lost five out of the seven tasks. Aubrey O'Day and Teresa Giudice joined Unanimous while Dee Snider, Lou Ferrigno, and Penn Jillette joined Forte.
- Task sponsor: Walgreens
- Task scope: The celebrities must develop a live interactive segment to promote the new "Walk with Walgreens" health kit. Teams would be judged on brand messaging, overall presentation, and the design of their kit.
- Unanimous project manager: Arsenio Hall
- Forte project manager: Lou Ferrigno
- Judges: Donald Trump; Eric Trump; Donald Trump Jr.
- Results:
  - Unanimous based their presentation on a game show theme, with Arsenio Hall hosting and Clay Aiken playing the announcer. Their show featured a sketch of each team member demonstrating the walking kit's effectiveness. Aubrey O'Day created the presentation's concept, "Face Reality", which featured the group's faces on their actual kit and quotes to live by.
  - Forte created a presentation that featured the kit as a multitasking activity. Lou Ferrigno hosted and gave an inspirational speech on the walking kit's effectiveness by incorporating how it worked with his hip replacement. In addition, Dayana Mendoza and Penn Jillette played pivotal roles in the segment as well.
- Dramatic tension: Lisa Lampanelli was not happy that Dayana Mendoza and Lou Ferrigno were on her team, and Penn Jillette was absent from a majority of the task after he could not cancel a show he planned beforehand. Lisa was frustrated with Lou's lack of input and did not like it when the men (particularly Dee Snider) defended Dayana in front of Don Jr. when he came for his status report. Aubrey O'Day irritated her new teammates with her controlling nature and she butted heads with Arsenio Hall throughout the entire task. She was called out in the boardroom for being overbearing and Arsenio attacked her for taking the credit of the team's quotes, which he felt were a team effort. Arsenio continued to attack Aubrey throughout the initial boardroom, eventually bringing her to tears after her teammates also stated she should be fired if Unanimous lost. Aubrey subsequently walked off the show after her team was dismissed from the boardroom, stating that she did not wish to be around their negativity and leaving her status on the show in question.
- Winning team: Unanimous
  - Reasons for win: Their presentation and its game show format received tremendous praise, in addition to the creative design of the kit and its complementary slogans from each team member.
- Losing team: Forte
  - Reasons for loss: While the executives loved Lou's testimonial in the presentation and the team focused on the right demographic, their walking kit had a very poor design and used negative words that were unappealing and inappropriate such as "itching", "scratching", "yelling". Their box had paled in comparison to their competitors and Penn Jillette even addressed the wrong branding company during the event, stating it was from Wal-Mart and not Walgreens.
  - Sent to boardroom: Lou Ferrigno, Dayana Mendoza, Dee Snider
- Fired: Dee Snider – for creating the walking kit's bad design. While Lou Ferrigno approved of Dee's designs and was chastised for not bringing back Penn Jillette (who couldn't even identify the correct brand) to the boardroom, Trump still felt Dee was responsible for the team's failure. Even with Dee's previous victory as a project manager and Lou's continued discrepancies, Dee could not convince Trump to spare him over Lou, who was praised by the executives.
- Notes:
  - This was a 3-hour long episode. It featured two tasks and a switch-up of the teams.
  - Arsenio Hall won $50,000 for his charity.
  - Alison Sweeney, host of The Biggest Loser, was a judge for this task along with the executives from Walgreens.
  - In response to winning, Arsenio became very emotional and made tributes to Magic Johnson and his cousin, who had recently died of AIDS. He then continued to lay siege into Aubrey O'Day with a profanity-laden rant about her talents and background.

=== Episode 8: Ad Hawk ===
Task 9

- Airdate: April 8, 2012
- Task sponsor: Entertainment Publications
- Task scope: Teams must create a 60-second commercial promoting the entertainment.com website and its mobile app. The celebrities will be judged on their commercial's creativity, product integration and brand messaging.
- Unanimous project manager: Teresa Giudice
- Forte project manager: Dayana Mendoza
- Judges: Donald Trump; Ivanka Trump; Donald Trump Jr.
- Results:
  - Unanimous' commercial featured Paul Teutul Sr. as a conservative looking father who believes his daughter (played by Aubrey O'Day) is doing something questionable with her boyfriend. He then goes to find that they are on Entertainment.com simply having fun with the website and its deals.
  - Forte's commercial did not incorporate any of the celebrities themselves, but was based around a love story with a couple using the website for each important stage in their relationship and addressing the different features that the website has to offer.
- Dramatic tension: Lisa Lampanelli was outraged that Dee Snider had been fired, feeling that Lou Ferrigno was an incompetent leader and that he should have been fired instead. She was also angry that she still had to work with Dayana Mendoza, who immediately stepped up as project manager for the task without even conferring with her team about it. Lisa continued to clash with Lou over trivial aspects of the task and Penn Jillette had to leave for a scheduled show and was absent for an extended amount of time once again. Aubrey O'Day returned for the next task after walking off the show in the previous episode and confronted Arsenio Hall for his actions in the previous boardroom. The two were able to put aside their differences for the task at hand, but Aubrey mocked Teresa Giudice's job as the team's leader and her role as the director of their commercial.
- Winning team: Unanimous
  - Reasons for win: While their concept was risque, the commercial that Unanimous made was more fun and creative. They incorporated the app more into their final product and were commended for Paul Teutul Sr.'s role, which showcased a transformation from his abrasive image to a more traditional looking father.
- Losing team: Forte
  - Reasons for loss: Even though the executives did like their commercial, they felt that the direction was poor and their storyline was predictable. They also felt that the app was not shown as effectively throughout the commercial as Unanimous had done. Trump also felt that their commercial could have used more star power.
  - Sent to boardroom: Dayana Mendoza, Lou Ferrigno, Lisa Lampanelli
- Fired: Lou Ferrigno – for his poor work ethic, failing to articulate his ideas until the boardroom, and for his effective disloyalty after he stated that the opposing team had a better commercial before a winner was even announced. While Trump respected Lou's honesty and his professional opinion, he ultimately had Lou fired for it.
- Notes:
  - Teresa Giudice won $60,000 for her charity
  - Arsenio Hall continued his tirade against Aubrey O'Day from the previous episode, going as far to brand her a "bitch" and a "whore". Lisa Lampanelli had her own meltdown soon after, claiming to be offended by his choice of words and reamed Arsenio for his behavior.
  - When quizzed by Trump prior to the result being announced, Teresa said that were the team to lose she could not hold anyone responsible for the loss, nor select two people for the final boardroom. Trump strongly implied that if the team lost and Teresa still refused to implicate any of her teammates, then he would fire two people from Unanimous, as he had done in the fourth task.
  - Lou Ferrigno got into a ferocious argument with Lisa in the boardroom after he stated that because Lisa called him and Dayana "f***in losers" if Lisa were a man, he would throw her through the wall. Lisa, who felt threatened by Lou and infuriated by his attacks, went after him and his efforts, aggressively yelling "I do the job & you don't, so get ready for an elevator ride, Lou!"
  - Dayana Mendoza's failure as project manager marked her fifth consecutive appearance in the boardroom. Trump took Dayana to task for all five of her boardroom appearances, but she contested that the executives still liked the commercial she ultimately made.
  - While she was very misgiving towards Dayana in the project's early stages, Lisa admitted in the boardroom that she was impressed with Dayana's organization throughout the task and that she was more of an asset than Lou was.
  - Despite being absent for a large amount of the task for the second time, Penn Jillette was excused from the final boardroom due to all the hard work he gave before his leave.
  - When discussing why Forte did not use any of their celebrity status in their commercial, Lisa inadvertently insulted Trump when she stated that it would have been inappropriate for Dayana and Penn to star in the commercial as lovers, given the 31-year difference in their ages. Trump, while taking the remark in good spirits, pointed out that he is 26 years older than his wife Melania.
  - After being fired, Lou unsuccessfully pleaded with Trump to change his decision. In his taxi ride, Lou claimed that even though he was fired, he felt vindicated that Forte's commercial had lost the task, since he had been opposed to the concept from the start.

=== Episode 9: Puppet Up! ===
Task 10

- Airdate: April 15, 2012
- Task sponsor: The Jim Henson Company
- Task scope: Teams must create two original characters for an improv comedy sketch in the "Stuffed and Unstrung" puppet show.
- Corporate Reshuffle: Clay Aiken is moved from Unanimous to Forte to even out the teams.
- Unanimous project manager: Paul Teutul Sr.
- Forte project manager: Lisa Lampanelli
- Judges: Donald Trump; Ivanka Trump; Eric Trump
- Dramatic tension: Paul Teutul Sr. had problems with his back and was a very passive leader, while Teresa Giudice seemed to struggle when dealing with her role as a puppeteer. This all irritated Aubrey O'Day, who tried to mind her place and be more of a team player given her standings with her team and the Trumps. Dayana Mendoza was offended by Lisa Lampanelli's impression of a Latin accent and felt that she wasn't being utilized enough when she wasn't selected to play a role in the show. The two got into a massive fight on the day of the task after Dayana wanted to contribute more, but Lisa viewed it as Dayana trying to be in front of the camera and getting in the way. When Lisa cried in the initial boardroom, Dayana was visibly amused.
- Winning team: Forte
  - Reasons for win: The team was commended for the style of their puppets and how well Clay Aiken and Lisa Lampanelli played into one another throughout their show. While their show did feature some inappropriate blue comedy material and Penn Jillette slipped out of his role (missed a couple of cues from timeline) as the host, their show was still superior.
- Losing team: Unanimous
  - Reasons for loss: Despite solid performances from Aubrey O'Day and Arsenio Hall, the puppets they made for the show were too complex & not versatile, the show went safe rather than taking risks, and lastly Teresa Giudice ended up breaking the rules of improvisation by using negatives and denials throughout the show.
  - Sent to boardroom: Paul Teutul Sr., Teresa Giudice, Aubrey O'Day
- Fired: Paul Teutul Sr. – for his lackluster, dismissive leadership and for not bringing back Arsenio Hall after he created an ill-designed puppet. Even though Paul did not bring back Arsenio because of his good performance in their show and Teresa Giudice's shortcomings were brought to light, Paul was still fired for stepping up as project manager on a task he was clearly not passionate about.
- Notes:
  - Lisa Lampanelli won $20,000 for her charity.

=== Episode 10: Winning by a Nose ===
Task 11

- Airdate: April 22, 2012
- Task sponsors: Donald Trump / Macy's
- Task scope: The celebrities must design in-store displays and a signature slogan for Trump's new cologne, Success.
- Unanimous project manager: Aubrey O'Day
- Forte project manager: Clay Aiken
- Judges: Donald Trump; George H. Ross; Eric Trump
- Dramatic tension: Penn Jillette came forward with many ideas for the display, which made Clay Aiken question why he took the role as project manager after Penn began drilling his ideas into the brainstorming process. Clay was turned off when Dayana Mendoza came up with racy ideas for the display and likewise, Dayana was not impressed with Clay's leadership. Lisa Lampanelli also spied on the other team during the task and realized that both teams were incorporating a skyline in their displays. Aubrey O'Day did not like Arsenio Hall's approach to the task, which was to have material symbols of success in their display. Aubrey became fed up with her teammates due to their lack of involvement, even though she took full control of the project's design. Her attitude continued to rub Arsenio the wrong way, especially after she made a back-handed comment during Unanimous' presentation.
- Winning team: Unanimous
  - Reasons for win: Their slogan ("Always Trust Your Instincts") was better and the branding was more consistent throughout their display. While there were inconsistencies with the silhouette of Eric Trump, Unanimous also featured sample smelling sticks and takeaway info cards, incorporating much more to offer than their opponents.
- Losing team: Forte
  - Reasons for loss: While they were praised for the elegant photo featuring Dayana Mendoza in their display, the executives felt it was too large and overpowered their display. They also did not like their slogan ("You Earned It"), feeling it was pompous and not even incorporated into the main display well enough.
  - Sent to boardroom: Clay Aiken, Penn Jillette, Dayana Mendoza
- Fired: Penn Jillette – for coming up with the bad slogan and taking responsibility for the ideas that the executives did not like. Even though Clay Aiken lost as project manager and Dayana Mendoza's sixth return to the boardroom broke the record for most boardroom appearances by a woman in the history of The Apprentice, Penn was still terminated in favor of Dayana and Clay.
- Notes:
  - Aubrey O'Day won $40,000 for her charity. Originally, Trump upped the winning team's award to $100,000. But after Trump felt that neither team delivered an outstanding product, he decided to give $10,000 to all the remaining contestants for the excellent job that both teams did, in place of the single $100,000 reward.
  - This was the second task to feature Aubrey and Clay Aiken as opposing project managers.

=== Episode 11: Jingle All the Way Home ===
Task 12

- Airdate: April 29, 2012
- Task sponsor: Good Sam Club
- Task scope: Teams are tasked with directing and performing a 90-second jingle to promote the Good Sam's Roadside Assistance Program.
- Unanimous project manager: Arsenio Hall
- Forte project manager: Dayana Mendoza
- Judges: Donald Trump; Ivanka Trump; Donald Trump Jr.
- Dramatic tension: Forte immediately fell apart at the seams after Dayana Mendoza lacked any significant knowledge about music and couldn't steer her team in the right direction as project manager. Consequently, Clay Aiken and Lisa Lampanelli attempted to educate her about music and took on a majority of the work. Dayana continued to aggravate her team by attempting to get involved and questioning her teammates, but without much knowledge or experience relative to her other teammates. Clay lost his patience with Dayana during the task and Lisa childishly stormed out from her.
- Winning team: Unanimous
  - Reasons for win: The team had a jingle that was much more catchy and their performance was more dynamic. While their cheerleading theme drew concerns towards age appropriateness for all of the Good Sam Club's demographics and that the executives would have seen Teresa's performance element, Unanimous also integrated the mascot, which worked much more effectively into their performance.
- Losing team: Forte
  - Reasons for loss: While the team did have a great presentation and applauded Clay Aiken's singing and Lisa Lampanelli's writing, the jingle itself didn't highlight the brand messaging. The executives felt the 1960s theme was too safe & conservative, even though their jingle was energetic. And lastly, the executives were disappointed in Dayana's appearance and felt that she should have played an active role.
  - Sent to boardroom: No final boardroom – Trump had enough information to make his final decision without the need of an internal review
- Fired: Dayana Mendoza – for lack of leadership, being unable to control her teammates and subsequently losing their respect, failing as a project manager for the second time. In addition to her poor efforts in the task, her record-breaking number of boardroom appearances and the character assassination by Lisa Lampanelli made it almost impossible for Dayana to continue.
- Notes:
  - Arsenio Hall won $45,000 for his charity. In addition, proceeds made from the jingle would also go towards Arsenio's selected charity (the Magic Johnson Foundation) in his name.
  - Clay Aiken was so frustrated with Dayana Mendoza during the task that he claimed he had to draw on the techniques he used to teach children with special needs in order to keep Dayana on track.
  - Lisa Lampanelli spared no mercy on Dayana in the boardroom, infuriated that she called Lisa out in front of Donald Trump Jr. and completely debunked Dayana of any good qualities before the results were revealed. Lisa even called her the "female Lou Ferrigno".

=== Episode 12: Blown Away ===
Task 13

- Airdate: May 6, 2012
- Task sponsors: Elle / Farouk Systems
- Task scope: Teams must create a four-page advertorial for the "Chi Touch" hairdryer for Elle magazine.
- Unanimous project manager: Teresa Giudice
- Forte project manager: Lisa Lampanelli
- Judges: Donald Trump; Eric Trump; Donald Trump Jr.
- Dramatic tension: Teresa Giudice poorly negotiated the choices of models with Lisa Lampanelli and ended up accepting a bad selection of models in order to get one particular red-headed model who they didn't even end up using in the ad. Teresa also played such a lax role as a leader that both Aubrey O'Day and Arsenio Hall were mistaken for being project manager at different points of the task. Clay Aiken found himself having to supervise Forte's photo shoot largely by himself after Lisa took a long time to buy clothes and get back to the studio.
- Winning team: Forte
  - Reasons for win: The message that Forte delivered in their print ad was easier to understand and included more information about the actual product. While there were concerns that the style of the ad was outdated, the executives also felt that Forte defined the readers of Elle better than their counterparts.
- Losing team: Unanimous
  - Reasons for loss: While their presentation was much more visually appealing and had great style with their advertorial, their ad failed to match with the style of Elle and it did not mention a substantial amount of information about the hairdryer. Despite praise for Arsenio Hall and Aubrey O'Day for their part in the presentation, the sponsors criticized Teresa Giudice for her awkwardness while presenting and a perceived lack of passion.
  - Sent to boardroom: No final boardroom – While there was a discussion between firing either Arsenio Hall or Teresa Giudice, Trump had enough information to make his final decision.
- Fired: Teresa Giudice – for giving a shaky presentation, making bad negotiations, having no ability to control either of her teammates and allowing them both to take too much control of the project. Along with her previous lackluster performances, this was also not the first time Teresa had failed the task as a project manager.
- Notes:
  - Lisa Lampanelli won $100,000 for her charity, the most in a non-fundraising task.
  - Arsenio Hall became very aggressive when Teresa Giudice attacked him in the boardroom, telling her "Don't throw me under the bus because I'll back it up and hit you with it".

Task 14

- Task scope: The final four candidates must go through interviews with John Rich and Marlee Matlin.
- Fired:
  - Lisa Lampanelli – for being unable to control her emotions. Although Lisa had raised the most money out of the remaining contestants, John and Marlee felt that she was unfit to become the Celebrity Apprentice, even though John noted she was a tough player.
  - Aubrey O'Day – for failing to impress John and Marlee, raising the least amount of money amongst the final four candidates, coming off as transparent, and for lacking the experience needed to win the show. While it was noted that she was a very strong player, Trump and his viceroys felt she was not strong enough to become the Celebrity Apprentice.
- Notes:
  - The interview portion will feature two contestants being fired, but it was only Lisa Lampanelli who was fired in this episode before it ended. Aubrey O'Day was fired in the first few minutes of the next episode.
  - During her interview with Marlee Matlin, Lisa compared herself to Meat Loaf, who was one of the semi-finalists from the previous season. Coincidentally, she was fired for exactly the same reason that Meat Loaf was, lack of emotional self-control.
  - Both Clay Aiken & Arsenio Hall ended up the same task record of 9–4, Aubrey O'Day's record was 6–7, while Lisa Lampanelli's record only ended up 4–9.
  - This was the first time on Celebrity Apprentice where neither of the two finalists was the person who had raised the most money until this point; Lisa Lampanelli had raised the most out of the four remaining players, while the person who had raised the most overall was Paul Teutul Sr., who had been fired three episodes previously.

=== Episode 13: And Then There Were Two ===
Task 15

- Airdate: May 13, 2012
- Task scope: The finalists together must create a variety show and each host a VIP reception prior to the show. They need to raise money by selling no more than 75 tickets each for the reception and show. They also must produce a 30-second ad about their charity to be shown at the variety show.
- Unanimous project manager: Arsenio Hall
  - Charity: Magic Johnson Foundation
  - Recruits: Adam Carolla, Lisa Lampanelli, Paul Teutul Sr., Teresa Giudice
- Forte project manager: Clay Aiken
  - Charity: National Inclusion Project
  - Recruits: Penn Jillette, Debbie Gibson, Dee Snider, Aubrey O'Day
- Judges: Donald Trump; Ivanka Trump; Donald Trump Jr.
- Dramatic tension: On Clay's team, Debbie Gibson suggested her cousin paint a mural in the team's event space on a 70'x22' wall. Clay insisted several times on seeing a sketch beforehand, but Debbie felt he should trust her judgement, especially since time was short. As mentioned by Don Jr. after visiting with Clay's team, it initially appeared that Clay's team was neglecting fundraising to focus on the other parts of the task. Aubrey O'Day and Clay were shown vying for control of some activities. On Arsenio Hall's team, team members complained that Arsenio was being too vague about what he wanted. Critical video footage of Magic Johnson shot by Adam Carolla employees in Los Angeles for Arsenio's charity ad appeared to be useless, as Johnson was shown speaking with his left side facing the camera.
- Notes:
  - The final task was completed in the following, final episode.

=== Episode 14: And the Winner Is... (Season Finale) ===
- Airdate: May 20, 2012
- The Celebrity Apprentice: Arsenio Hall – For being undefeated as project manager, having kept his fundraising total close to Clay's, and for being seen as having done the better job on the final task.
- Runner Up: Clay Aiken – Despite his having earned more money than Arsenio, Trump did not feel able to name either of them the winner based on fundraising alone (seeing how Paul Teutul Sr. had out-earned both of them prior to the final prize being awarded), and ultimately deemed Arsenio the stronger candidate overall.
- Notes:
  - Michael Andretti and Cheryl Tiegs did not appear for the reunion. (Andretti was at Indianapolis 500 qualifying weekend overseeing his INDYCAR team.)
    - Son Marco made a cameo by appearing and donating money towards Arsenio Hall's event. Originally, Marco was to have participated, but withdrew as taping started during an INDYCAR investigation into the Las Vegas tragedy in October 2011.
    - Father Mario appeared at the beginning of the episode driving Trump in a race car
  - Lisa Lampanelli gave Arsenio Hall $50,000 in donation pledges she had collected in case she became a finalist and donated $10,000 of her own money to Clay's team.
  - Orel Hershiser made an appearance, making a donation towards Clay's event
  - Whoopi Goldberg made an appearance at Arsenio Hall's event.

== US Nielsen ratings ==
Order	Airdate	Rating	Share	Rating/Share (18–49)	Viewers (millions)	Rank (timeslot)	Rank (night)
1	February 19, 2012	4.4	7	2.6/6	7.42	#2	#6
2	February 26, 2012	3.1	5	1.8/4	5.20	#3	#6
3	March 4, 2012	4.1	7	2.3/6	6.67	#3	#7
4	March 11, 2012			2.0/5	6.45		
5	March 18, 2012			1.8/4	5.80		
6	March 25, 2012			1.8/5	6.04		
7	April 1, 2012			1.9/5	5.96		
8	April 8, 2012			2.1/6	6.52		
9	April 15, 2012			2.2/6	6.66		
10	April 22, 2012			2.1/5	6.31		
11	April 29, 2012			2.0/5	6.38		
12	May 6, 2012			1.9/5	6.23		
13	May 13, 2012			1.8/5	5.48		
14	May 20, 2012			2.2/6	6.86		
