= Eat, Pray, Love =

Eat, Pray, Love may refer to

- Eat Pray Love, a 2010 American biographical romantic drama film
- Eat Pray Love (book), a 2006 memoir by American author Elizabeth Gilbert, on which the film was based
