= BlinkNow Foundation =

Nonprofit organization

- Founded: 2007
- Founder: Maggie Doyne
- Region served: Surkhet, Nepal
- Website: blinknow.org

BlinkNow Foundation is a nonprofit organization that operates a school and children's home in Surkhet, Nepal. Co-founded by New Jersey native Maggie Doyne when she was 19 years old, along with Nepali Tope Bahadur Malla, BlinkNow has been recognized as an example of "DIY philanthropy."

== Programs ==
On its campus in Surkhet, BlinkNow's Kopila Valley School provides tuition-free education from preschool to 12th grade for more than 400 students from under-resourced backgrounds and employs more than 150 local teachers and support staff. The children's home provides shelter, nutrition, and support for children who have been orphaned and other at-risk children. The campus also features a health clinic and women's center. It is a community development model for other agencies and schools, and the staff now mentor fellow professionals.

== Sustainability & Campus ==
BlinkNow identifies sustainability as one of its core values. The school campus features rammed earth walls that are nearly half a meter thick in addition to multiple solar power generation and rainwater collection and recycling systems.

In 2017, the organization opened a new campus for its Kopila Valley School which it has billed as "the greenest school in Nepal."

In 2025, a new eco-friendly Children's Village was completed near the school, to include family-style homes for 50 children, housing for staff caregivers, space for 40+ graduate young adults to return home to visit, and a community program headquarters for all BlinkNow programs.

== Notable Supporters ==
BlinkNow received widespread attention after its founder, Maggie Doyne, was selected as CNN Hero of the Year in 2015.

In 2016, author Elizabeth Gilbert shared a video of herself singing a karaoke version of Bonnie Tyler's “Total Eclipse of the Heart” to raise money for the organization after learning Doyne was in part inspired by her memoir Eat, Pray, Love.

In August 2019, the organization was featured by Harry and Meghan, the Duke and Duchess of Sussex, on their Instagram feed along with other organizations including the Earth Day Network and Children International.

Actor and Producer Mark Duplass and his Duplass Brothers Productions have supported the organization with charity fundraising events, appearances on game shows to play for BlinkNow, and production of Jeremy Power Regimbal's documentary feature film Between the Mountain and the Sky profiling Maggie Doyne, Tope Bahadur Malla, and children who have grown up in Kopila Valley.
