= Children International =

Global nonprofit humanitarian organization focused on ending child poverty

- Abbreviation: CI
- Formation: 1936
- Type: NGO
- Legal status: Foundation
- Headquarters: Kansas City, Missouri
- CEO: Susana Eshleman
- Website: children.org

Children International is a global nonprofit humanitarian organization that helps children break the cycle of poverty. It addresses children’s critical needs through early intervention and regular interaction in community centers. The goal is to help children overcome the effects of poverty, support their education, and prepare youth to contribute to society.

The organization provides health support, such as an annual medical exam and care during illness. If a child needs more advanced health intervention, the organization assists in providing referrals to specialists. Beyond these critical needs, Children International provides nutritional support, dental care, counseling for children and families, school supplies and fees, clothing, and items for the home. It also engages youth through leadership development opportunities, scholarships, and financial and job-skills training. An example of youth programming is "Into Employment," where participating youth receive training in welding, electrical, refrigeration, and industrial mechanics. Youth may also take courses on sales techniques, customer service, accounting, critical thinking, and leadership. The international hotel chain InterContinental is one business working with the charity to provide job skills training for youth in Mexico. Children International has also worked with the Starwood Foundation to help youth prepare for jobs in the hospitality industry.

Children International ran other notable programs, including a school feeding program in Zambia. With support from Houghton Mifflin Harcourt, Children International offered a global community literacy program. The charity has been recognized for giving out books in the Philippines, Kenya, and Malawi. The organization also hosted reading tents in Uganda.

Children International has engaged in humanitarian aid after disasters. They provided assistance in the Philippines after Typhoon Haiyan, distributing personal care supplies, clothing, food, water, and other relief. Children International also pledged to assist the recovery effort with rebuilding and other aid.

== History ==
Santa Paula Community Center in Tonalá, Jalisco, México

Known in its earlier years as "Holy Land Christian Mission," Children International was founded in 1936. The organization distributed food baskets to widows and poor families, provided early childhood education, and operated a small medical clinic as well as a children’s home for orphans. This clinic was expanded following a polio outbreak in 1952 and became larger and more sophisticated over the years. Eventually known as the Mt. David Crippled Children’s Hospital, the clinic provided critical orthopedic medical services until its closure.

In the 1980s, the organization began expanding its scope by launching sponsorship agencies in Guatemala, Colombia, Honduras, and the Dominican Republic. It would later change its name to Children International. Children International became a secular organization which supports equal participation for all children regardless of religion.

The organization operates in 10 countries, including Colombia, the Dominican Republic, Ecuador, Guatemala, Honduras, India, Mexico, the Philippines, the United States, and Zambia.

== Approach ==
According to the Children International website, the organization's goal is to graduate healthy, educated, empowered, and employed young adults from their program so they can achieve the goal of breaking the cycle of poverty. The organization delivers these results via its community centers, which offer programs, computers, libraries, and other educational tools. Educational support of this kind is frequently absent or difficult to acquire in impoverished areas, leading to secondary illiteracy and educational lags.

Community centers serve as a distribution network for aid, although the focus is on using each center as "a unique support system" that offers skill and leadership training, college preparation, and confidence building. Children International has indicated that its interests lie in cross-sector work with private industry, local and national governments, individuals, and other non-governmental organizations. Children International uses a child sponsorship model to fund these activities, with nearly all of its funding coming from private donations. The foundation has also decided to receive donations in additional ways, such as opening an option to donate in select cryptocurrencies. Funds are transferred to each agency, which oversee the organization’s community centers according to an approved budget.

== Celebrity supporters ==
Singer and longtime CI supporter Debbie Gibson was featured as a contestant on the 2012 season of The Celebrity Apprentice on NBC. From the show, she raised $50,000 for CI and her winnings went towards the construction of a community center to serve 5,000 poor children in New Delhi, India. The community center will include a medical and dental clinic, pharmacy, library, computer lab, and playground. The center will allow impoverished children to receive much-needed health care and educational support they would not have otherwise. In 2014, Gibson again demonstrated her support for the organization by donating proceeds from her appearance on the television show "Celebrity Home Raiders" to CI.

Joel Lambert, the ex-Navy SEAL star of the Discovery Channel show Lone Target, has discussed his support of the organization and sponsorship of a Filipino boy through the Children International program.

James Valenti, an American operatic tenor, has been vocal about his support of Children International and has visited its operations in the Dominican Republic. Marco Antonio Regil, a Mexican television personality and game show host, cites Children International as one of his charities and has filmed commercials in support of the organization.

In August 2014, Paola Espinosa, a Mexican diving and synchronized swimming champion, announced her collaboration with Children International and its sports program. In August 2019, the organization was featured by Harry and Meghan, the Duke and Duchess of Sussex, on their Instagram feed along with other organizations, including the Earth Day Network and BlinkNow Foundation.

== Partnerships and alliances ==
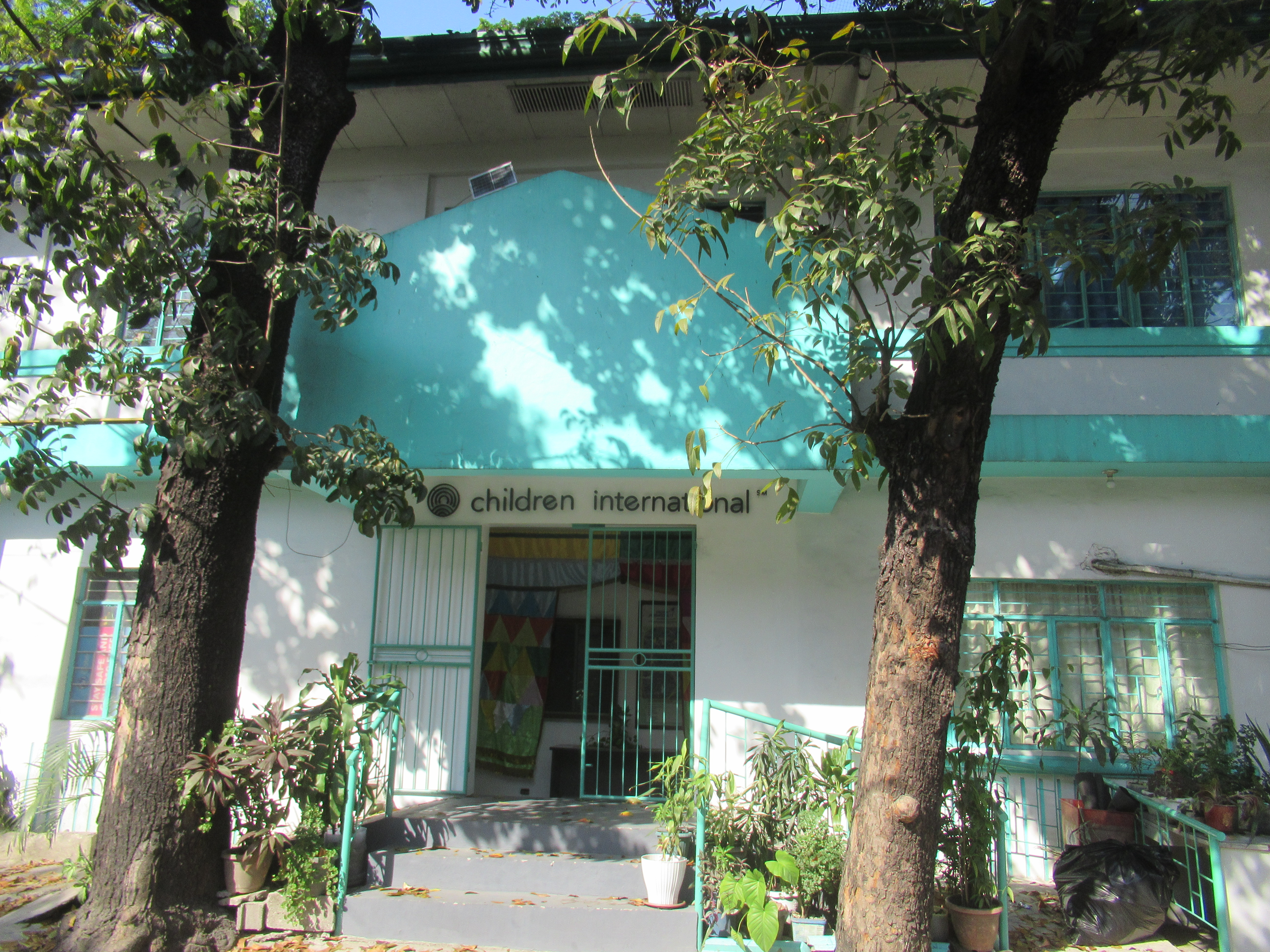
Children International, Quezon City, Philippines

Children International has worked with a number of organizations and agencies.

=== USAID ===
With the support of USAID, Children International launched A Ganar, a work training program in Guatemala in early 2014. Previously, the charity piloted a program with USAID/Colombia called Hope for Colombia’s Children that trained youth in conflict resolution. In 2024, Children International also received a grant from USAID to support the shipment of medical supplies to the Philippines and Zambia.

=== Peace Corps ===
Children International has worked with the U.S. Peace Corps in a number of countries. The organization has trained Peace Corps volunteers in Guatemala, and has worked on several water-related projects in the Philippines, including a sanitation project and installation of water pumps. In 2014, the organizations co-authored a comprehensive youth leadership training manual titled "Leadership Training through Project Design and Management."

=== United Nations ===
Children International assisted the United Nations on its global campaign The World We Want. The UN recognized the organization’s efforts to include poor children’s opinions in the effort.

=== Aflatoun ===
Children International began its partnership with Aflatoun in 2010, when it implemented its programs in three countries: Ecuador, India and the Philippines. Children International has since expanded Aflatoun to its sponsorship areas, including Colombia and Honduras. In November 2013, Children International launched the first Aflatoun program in the United States at its Little Rock, Arkansas location.

In 2012, sponsored child Carla Vasquez from Guayaquil, Ecuador, was awarded the Youth Champion Award in Geneva, Switzerland by Child and Youth Finance. In 2013, Children International had two children, one from Ecuador and one from India, qualify as finalists with their Aflatoun projects at the Child & Youth Finance International Movement.

=== TOMS Shoes ===
Children International has been a TOMS Giving Partner since 2013. As part of their One-for-One shoe program, TOMS Shoes worked with Children International to distribute shoes in a Philippine community that was hard hit by Typhoon Haiyan.

=== PAHO ===
During A Promise Renewed for the Americas, a 2013 gathering of organizations including USAID and the Pan American Health Organization (PAHO/World Health Organization), 18-year-old sponsored youth Nelson Hernandez Jimenez signed the Declaration of Panama on behalf of Children International. The document recognizes a continuing commitment to address issues of child, maternal, and reproductive health in the region.

=== Operation Change ===
Children International was featured on Oprah Winfrey's OWN original program "Operation Change" in 2014. The show focused on the organization’s early childhood development efforts in India and sports program in Colombia.

=== Aura's House ===
Aura's House worked with Children International on Small Scale, Doable Projects.

=== UNICEF ===
Sponsored youth in the Philippines, trained by Children International, have assisted UNICEF in disaster relief. Children International has also implemented a child protection policy based on the tenets of UNICEF’s Core Commitments for Children in Emergencies.

=== Eli Lilly ===
The Eli Lilly and Company's Lilly MDR-TB Partnership worked with Children International to create a public awareness campaign in India in 2009 that continued for several years. Sponsored youth, trained as Youth Peer Educators (YPE), supported tuberculosis patients during their treatment and worked as change agents to decrease stigma about the disease and increase overall community awareness of the illness.

=== Pan-American Games ===
Children International was named sole charity partner for the 2011 Pan-American Games. Subsequently, it released the video "Soy Panamericano".

=== Americorps ===
Children International's United States' program, located in Little Rock, Arkansas, partners with Americorps.

=== DigiBayanihan ===
DigiBayanihan is a movement that seeks to champion digital literacy among Filipinos. The campaign was initiated by a multi-stakeholder partnership, including organizations such as Intel Philippines and Children International-Philippines, which have come together to empower the underserved.

=== Clinique ===
Children International was selected as a partner for Clinique's Difference Maker Initiative, which supports education for girls.

=== University of Kansas ===
The University of Kansas partnered with Children International in Guatemala to build a positive sports environment for kids. The director of KU’s Sport and Exercise Psychology Lab taught Children International volunteers and staff how to use a caring, task-involving approach where children feel supported, effort is rewarded, and teamwork is encouraged.

=== Clean the World ===
Children International has worked with Clean the World to distribute soap and hygiene products to people in need.

== Reception ==
- UALR Children International was part of a collaboration that received a $1.2 million grant from the National Science Foundation. The purpose of the grant was to launch a new program aimed at improving Arkansas’ early education opportunities in science, technology, engineering and mathematics.
- Dilnasheen Alamgir, a former sponsored child in Kolkata, India, runs a small business recycling waste materials and turning them into handicrafts. Her entrepreneurship was recognized at the 2014 Children and Youth Finance International meeting held at the UN and UNICEF headquarters in New York.
- In 2014, Kelli Suen, a former sponsored child who served as the youth council president at Children International’s Little Rock, Arkansas program, was awarded a Disney’s Friends for Change grant. She used the funds to assemble survival kits for the homeless in her community.
- Paula Rogers received the 2014 Lewis Hine Award from the National Child Labor Committee in New York. Rogers is Children International’s education manager in Little Rock, Arkansas, and she oversees programs for students in kindergarten through 12th grade.
- Children International received the National Gawad Kalasag Award in the Philippines and was the Hall of Fame Awardee for having won as Best Civil Society Organization on Humanitarian Assistance for three consecutive years (2010–2012).
- Ingrams Magazine identified the organization as the top area non-profit organization for Kansas City, the location of Children International’s world headquarters.
- Charity Navigator gives Children International 4/4 stars.
- The Better Business Bureau has given CI accredited status, meaning that it "meets all 20 Standards for Charity Accountability and is a Seal Holder."
- Children International is part of the Combined Federal Campaign, which promotes charitable giving among government workers in the United States. Its number is 12078.
- The National Disaster Coordinating Council in the Philippines awards Children International top honors in disaster relief.
- CharityWatch lists Children International as a top-rated charity giving it an "A" grade.
- Children International has platinum status with GuideStar, the highest level of recognition for commitment to transparency.
- Users on Great Nonprofits rated Children International with an average 4.5- out of 5-star rating. The organization was also ranked as a Top-Rated Nonprofit by Great Nonprofits.
- Forbes magazine recognized Children International, a U.S.-based humanitarian organization, as a top U.S. charity in its "Top 100 Largest U.S. Charities" list for 2012. The Forbes list includes ratios regarding a nonprofit's level of fundraising efficiency and charitable commitment and the press release.
