= Social Diary Daily =

Alabamian magazine

January 2012 cover

Social Diary Daily is an American magazine published in Tuscaloosa, Alabama by Mann and Associates. The first print issue was printed and released in December 2010 featuring cover model, Holly Robinson Peete.

== History ==
Social Diary Daily was founded by Melissa Russell. The first issue was published in December 2010.

In 2007, Russell had created and produced Social Diary Daily as an online radio talk show. In 2009, the Daily Diary became Social Diary Daily Online Radio Talk Show

== Content ==
Social Diary Daily is centered around helping women deal with problems and providing everyday solutions, benefits, options and alternatives. Each issue's cover features the founder or active participant of a charity. The magazine does not feature any articles, stories or advertisements that have a religious or political background.

== The brand ==
In 2011, Social Diary Daily developed a line of herbal fruit teas called Social Teas. Later the brand created Social Coasters to accompany the herbal teas.

== Awards ==
Social Diary Daily magazine received two consecutive awards for being "Socially Involved" in the community and another award for "Best Story Features".

== Influential Honors Ceremony ==
On December 7, 2011, Social Diary Daily hosted an Influential Awards Ceremony honoring those who have embraced the covers of the magazine and their philanthropic work. Previous honorees have included Holly Robinson Peete and the Holly Rod Foundation, Cookie Johnson and the Magic Johnson Foundation; and the Wayuu Taya Foundation; and Xernona Clayton and the Trumpet Foundation. Monies that are raised during this event is donated to a local charity.
