= Maggie Doyne =

American humanitarian

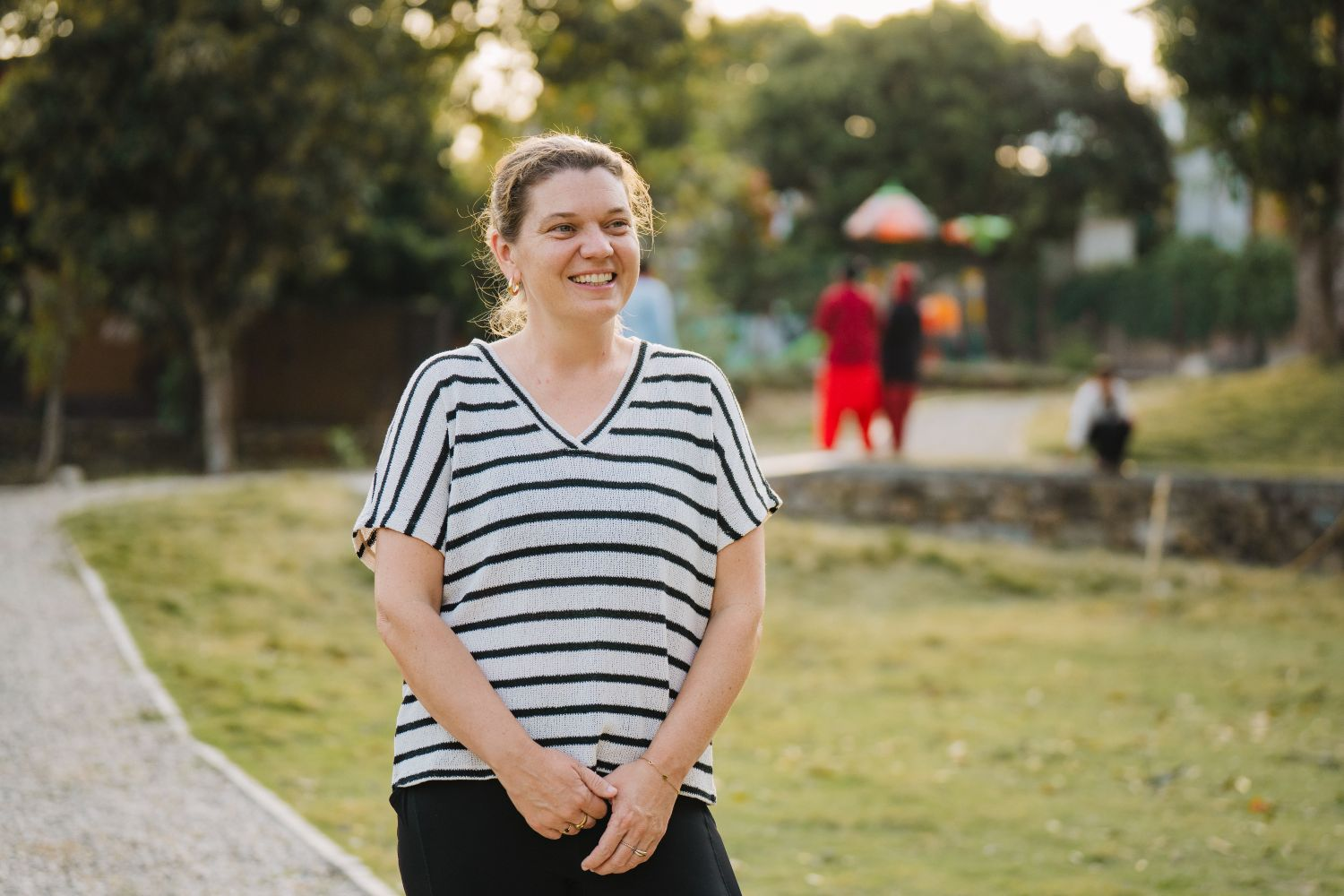
- Doyne at the Kopila Valley Children's Village in 2026
- Born: Margaret Mary Doyne; November 7, 1986 (age 39); Mendham Borough, New Jersey, United States of America
- Occupations: Humanitarian, nonprofit CEO and co-founder
- Notable work: Founder of The BlinkNow Foundation; Kopila Valley Children's Home, School, and Women's Center
- Website: www.blinknow.org

Maggie Doyne (Nepali: म्यागी डोएन) (born c. 1986) is an American humanitarian who co-founded BlinkNow Foundation, an organization that built a children's home, women's center and school together with the community in Surkhet, Nepal. She was named a CNN Hero in 2015. She is the author of Between the Mountain and the Sky: A Mother’s Story of Love, Loss, Healing, and Hope (2022) and subject of the documentary film of the same name (2024).

== Early life ==
Doyne grew up in Mendham Borough, New Jersey with parents Steve and Nancy Doyne and sister Kate. After she was born, her father quit his job as the manager of a natural food store to be a stay-at-home dad, while her mother worked in real estate. Doyne attended West Morris Mendham High School and babysat in her spare time.

== Nepal and BlinkNow Founding ==
In 2005, following her high school graduation, Maggie took a "gap year" to travel with the organization LeapNow. During that trip, she spent time volunteering at a children's home in northern India. While there, Doyne became friends with a refugee from Nepal and during a cease-fire in the Nepalese Civil War, went with her to visit her home village.

In Nepal, Doyne met six-year-old Hima, who was barely surviving on the few rupees she earned by breaking stones in a dry riverbed and selling them. Doyne helped Hima go to school, paying for her tuition, uniform, and books, and expanded her efforts to help more children. Doyne, at just 19, used $5,000 she had saved from babysitting to help even more children and phoned her parents at home to send her the money.

With her money, the local community, and more funds from supporters worldwide, Doyne and co-founder Top Malla purchased land in the Surkhet valley. Top, a Nepali that Doyne had met in India, also has a passion to care for local children from his home region.

Their project in Nepal now runs a school, children's home, women's center, and girls' safe house. It is a community development model for other agencies and schools, and the staff mentor fellow professionals via an annual NGO/education Summit and Leadership Development Program.

== BlinkNow Foundation ==
The BlinkNow Foundation is a non-profit organization founded by Doyne and Malla in 2007 that provides financial support and management oversight to the Kopila Valley School, Children’s Home, Women’s Center, Health Clinic, Big Sisters' Home, and New Children's Village in Surkhet, Nepal. The Foundation is the sole provider of funding, and Kopila Valley is the only recipient of BlinkNow funding. The Foundation is an official 501(c)(3) organization with a US-based board. It has headquarters located in the United States and Nepal. Kopila Valley programs are also governed by a local Nepali board of directors. BlinkNow operates at the grassroots level of community and focuses on promoting sustainability and self-reliance in the Surkhet community.

== Kopila Valley ==
Kopila Valley projects, funded by The BlinkNow Foundation, encompass a school, a children's home, a women's center, a girls' safe house, a health clinic, and a focus on sustainability and environmental, place-based learning.

In 2007, the Kopila Valley Children’s Home opened, and Doyne and the caregiving team became the legal guardians for more than 45 children. Today, the home has moved to the Kopila Valley Children's Village, completed in 2025, and holds 50 children and also has space for 40 young adults who have graduated and are living independently but return for family holidays.

Dissatisfied with the education children were receiving and wanting to help other children in the community, Doyne and Malla opened the Kopila Valley School in 2010, and it now serves 450+ students per year. Many are the first in their families to attend school. The school provides students with health care and food, and employs around 150 Nepalis, including teachers, staff, a principal, vice-principal, health administrator, counselor and a health technician. The curriculum supplements the Nepali national curriculum with additional teaching and learning in literature, art, theater, music and sports. Classes are taught in both Nepali and English, and stress creative and critical thinking. In 2025, students in grades 8, 10, and 12 all passed grade exit exams at a rate of 100%.

The Kopila Valley Women's Center opened in 2013, providing literacy and vocational skills courses, human rights training, and social support to the women of Surkhet. Graduates of the Women’s Center formed a cooperative of weavers, which sells goods to the local community and provides uniforms for the Kopila Valley School.

In 2011, the Kopila Valley Health Clinic opened in partnership with the Kopila Valley School. This community health clinic's main focus is in education and prevention. It offers essential primary care, dental care, and mental health services to the Kopila Valley children and staff, as well as the larger Surkhet community.

The Kopila Valley Big Sisters' Home opened in 2017 in order to provide a safe environment for the most at-risk young female students of Kopila Valley School. It has been home to 24 girls to date and offers counseling and support as students prepare to reintegrate with their biological families or guardians.

Doyne, Malla, and their team opened a sustainable campus for Kopila Valley School in 2010, now the greenest school in Nepal. A team of engineers, architects, developers and environmental experts incorporated sustainable and green techniques to build the school. The new Kopila Valley School is on almost three acres of purchased land – serving as pre-primary school, primary school, secondary school through 12th grade, post-secondary school and vocational center. The campus also has a farm and fruit nursery for use as teaching tools in gardening and place-based learning, and for supplying food products to the Kopila Valley School and Kopila Valley Children’s Home.

== Book and Film ==
In 2022 Doyne published Between the Mountain and the Sky, A Mother's Story of Love, Loss, Healing and Hope.

In 2024, Doyne's filmmaker husband Jeremy Power Regimbal, together with Duplass Brothers Productions, released a documentary film, Between the Mountain and the Sky, a story spanning 10 years of filming Doyne, Malla, and the children of Kopila Valley.

== Recognition ==
- 2026 Speaker at NEXUS Global Summit in New York City
- 2026 Commencement Speaker & Honorary Doctorate of Humane Letters, Fairfield University
- 2025 Global Justice Love and Peace Summit - Peace Award
- 2024 Gold Anthem Award for Humanitarian Action & Services,
- 2023 Confederation of Nepalese Industries Women’s Leadership Forum - Inspiring Woman of the Year
- 2015 CNN Hero of the Year
- 2015 Honorary Doctor of Pedagogy, St. Bonaventure University
- 2014 Unsung Hero of Compassion, awarded by the Dalai Lama
- 2013 Speaker at Forbes Women's Summit: Power Redefined
- 2013 Forbes Excellence in Education Award
- 2012 Speaker at Forbes 400 Summit on Philanthropy
- 2009 Grand Prize Winner of the Do Something Awards
