= Pilgrims (short story collection) =

Short stories collection by Elizabeth Gilbert published in 1997

- Book cover
- Author: Elizabeth Gilbert
- Language: English
- Genre: Short stories
- Publisher: Houghton Mifflin
- Publication date: 1997
- Publication place: United States
- Media type: Print (hardback & paperback)
- Pages: 224 pp

Pilgrims is a collection of twelve short stories by American author Elizabeth Gilbert. It was named a New York Times Notable Book, won a Pushcart Prize, and was a finalist for the PEN/Hemingway Award.

Several stories from the collection were staged at the Greenwich Street Theater in March and April 2000, with continued runs at the Tribeca Playhouse in January and April 2001.

== Stories ==
1. "Pilgrims" (first appeared in Esquire)
2. "Elk Talk" (first appeared in Story)
3. "Alice to the East"
4. "Bird Shot"
5. "Tall Folks" (first appeared in Mississippi Review)
6. "Landing"
7. "Come and Fetch These Stupid Kids"
8. "The Many Things That Denny Brown Did Not Know (Age Fifteen)"
9. "The Names of Flowers and Girls" (first appeared in Ploughshares)
10. "At the Bronx Terminal Vegetable Market"
11. "The Famous Torn and Restored Lit Cigarette Trick" (first appeared in The Paris Review)
12. "The Finest Wife" (first appeared in Story)
