= Committed: A Skeptic Makes Peace with Marriage =

2010 book by Elizabeth Gilbert

- Author: Elizabeth Gilbert
- Language: English
- Subject: Marriage
- Genre: Memoir
- Publisher: Viking Press
- Publication date: January 5, 2010
- Media type: Print (hardcover · paperback)
- Pages: 481 (hardcover)
- ISBN: 978-1-4104-2276-7

Committed: A Skeptic Makes Peace with Marriage is a 2010 book written by Elizabeth Gilbert as a follow-up book to her book Eat, Pray, Love. It was published on January 5, 2010, by Viking.

== Summary ==
Eighteen months after Eat, Pray, Love, Elizabeth Gilbert fell in love with "Felipe", the Brazilian-born man of Australian citizenship whom she met in Bali. After resettling in America, the couple swore their love for each other, but also swore never to get married again after they both had bitter divorces. But when the United States government tells them that Felipe cannot enter the U.S. unless they get married, or he would never be allowed to enter the country again, they break their promise and get married. Gilbert tackled her fears of marriage by getting into the topic of marriage completely, trying her hardest to discover through research, interviews, and personal reflection on what marriage really is.

== Reviews ==
Carolyn See writing for The Washington Post stated: "This story is essentially journalism, written by an extremely competent journalist. It doesn't pretend to be anything more than that. It's a charming narrative that ends, Shakespearean-fashion, with a happy-hearted wedding. What's not to like?"

It spent 57 weeks at the number one spot for paperback nonfiction on the New York Times best-seller list.
