= Large and in Charge =

Studio album by Chunky A
- Released: 1989
- Genre: Comedy rap
- Label: MCA Records
- Producer: Arsenio Hall; Attala Zane Giles

Large and in Charge is a 1989 comedy rap album by Arsenio Hall, released under the name of his "portly rapping alter ego" Chunky A. It is his only release under this name.

== Background ==
Arsenio Hall began hosting The Arsenio Hall Show in 1989, and that same year, recorded and released the Large and in Charge album as Chunky A. Chunky A was marketed humorously as Hall's overweight younger brother who had been a roadie for Barry Manilow. Hall wrote the album and was a co-producer. The album was a minor hit, reaching #71 on the Billboard 200, and one single, "Owwww!", charted, reaching #77 on the Billboard Hot 100. "Owwww!"'s music video featured Hall in a fatsuit wearing a necklace chain with a large golden "A" on it. "Sorry" was also released as a single, but did not chart. The album included the tracks "Ho Is Lazy" (a parody of Fine Young Cannibals' "She Drives Me Crazy") and "Dope, the Big Lie" (an anti-drug song featuring Paula Abdul, Wil Wheaton, and Ice-T).

Contemporaneous reviews of the album were mixed. The Orlando Sentinel remarked, "Although he's occasionally mildly funny, Chunk's rhymes are less def than deficient - and less dope than dopey." The Los Angeles Times gave the album three stars out of five, describing the album as "a raunchy, frequently hilarious album that's part rap--reflecting influences by the Fat Boys and Heavy D--and part funk, done in the talk-singing style of George Clinton and Cameo's Larry Blackmon."

== Track listing ==
1. "Owwww!"
2. "Large and in Charge"
3. "Stank Breath"
4. "Ho Is Lazy"
5. "Sorry"
6. "I Command You to Dance"
7. "Very High Key"
8. "Dipstick"
9. "Dope, the Big Lie"
