= Aura's House =

Online grassroots project

Aura’s House is an online grassroots project, which raises funds for needy children and their families. Specifically, Aura’s House raises funds for housing, health, income generation, and education projects for needy children in developing countries.

- Aura’s House was originally created to raise $4,500 to build a safe, sturdy brick home for the founder's sponsored child, Aura Hernandez and her family in Guatemala. Since that goal was met in November 2004, Aura’s House began to launch other small projects in an effort to help bring big changes to the lives of families in developing countries.
- Aura's House has been working in conjunction with Children International since February 2003. 100% of donations go toward their projects and are 100% US Tax Deductible. All persons working at Aura’s House are volunteers who receive no form of monetary payment for their efforts.

== History ==
- Aura's House originally began in February 2003 when Kristen Palana, a Professor of Digital Media at William Paterson University in New Jersey was learning PHP programming and adding dynamic content to websites. Kristen wanted to originally use the site to raise $4500 to build a sturdy brick home for her sponsored child, Aura in Guatemala with the help of Children International. After waiting over a year for all the required permissions from Children International, finally on June 30, 2004 the site was ready to launch.
- Aura's House has raised money for children and their families in the following countries: Guatemala, Honduras, Mexico, Ecuador, the Dominican Republic, Colombia, Ghana, Zambia, Kenya, India, the Philippines, and the United States.

== Types of projects ==
- Housing: Aura’s House originally started with a housing project and has continued to raise funds for those in need of shelter or repairs to their homes.
- Food, Supplies and Repairs: Aura’s House has raised funds to help provide families with a variety of household needs items such as beds, mattresses, blankets, furniture, clothing, and food supplies.
- Education: Aura’s House has raised money on behalf of several schools and sponsored individual children so that they may attend school or continue their education. In addition, they have helped raise funds for school supplies such as books, desks, uniforms, and laboratory equipment for science courses.
- Health: Some examples of these types of projects include the construction of a water well for a village in India as well as projects that raise funds for medicine and food supplies for individual families.
- Income Generating Projects: These projects provide families with the means to generate income on their own.

== Affiliates ==
Aura's House is affiliated with Children International, a Kansas City, Missouri based 501(c)(3) non-profit organization dedicated to bettering the lives of impoverished children which connects individual sponsors with children living in poverty. Aura’s House started working with Children International in 2003. Officials from Children International oversee the implementation of all projects once the money is raised, as well as choose recipients for certain projects. Today they continue to work together with Aura's House raising funds that are then distributed via Children International to the specified projects. Children International also provides Aura’s House with photos and updates to Aura’s House projects both past and present. In addition to Children International, Aura’s House has also worked with Kenya Kids in Need, a California 501(c)(3) organization dedicated to the Galilee School as well as Child Focus Fund, an Illinois 501(c)(3) organization that helped with the Ghana Project.

== Fundraising ==
Aura’s House relies on grassroots methods for raising money. It is an organization that is run exclusively by volunteers and because of this, 100% of donations go directly to their projects. All donations are 100% US Tax Deductible and go directly to Children International.
