= The Signature of All Things =

2013 novel by Elizabeth Gilbert

- First edition (publ. Viking Press)
- Author: Elizabeth Gilbert
- Language: English
- Genre: literary fiction
- Publication date: 2013
- Publication place: United States
- ISBN: 9780670016884

The Signature of All Things is a novel by Elizabeth Gilbert. It was originally published in 2013 and longlisted for the Baileys Women's Prize for Fiction.

During her research for the novel, Gilbert relied on the book Gathering Moss: A Natural and Cultural History of Mosses by Robin Wall Kimmerer. Gilbert said of the book and Kimmerer, "That book had been my touchstone during my research. She's my Mick Jagger." Gilbert later visited Kimmerer in person to ensure the plot of the novel was "scientifically plausible."

== Overview ==
The story follows Alma Whittaker, daughter of a botanical explorer, as she comes into her own within the world of plants and science. As Alma’s careful studies of moss take her deeper into the mysteries of evolution, she starts a spiritual journey which spans the 19th Century.

== Critical reception ==
The reception to the book has been positive. Elizabeth Day of The Guardian praised the complex characters, calling "Alma's journey a universal one, despite anchoring her protagonist's life in a different time and sending her to the furthest corners of the unexplored earth." Barbara Kingsolver of The New York Times labelled it "a bracing homage to the many natures of genius and the inevitable progress of ideas, in a world that reveals its best truths to uncommonly patient minds."
