= Eat Pray Love =

2010 film by Ryan Murphy

- Theatrical release poster
- Directed by: Ryan Murphy
- Screenplay by: Ryan Murphy; Jennifer Salt
- Based on: Eat, Pray, Love by Elizabeth Gilbert
- Produced by: Dede Gardner
- Starring: Julia Roberts; James Franco; Richard Jenkins; Viola Davis; Billy Crudup; Javier Bardem
- Cinematography: Robert Richardson
- Edited by: Bradley Buecker
- Music by: Dario Marianelli
- Production companies: Columbia Pictures; Plan B Entertainment
- Distributed by: Sony Pictures Releasing
- Release date: August 13, 2010
- Running time: 133 minutes; 140 minutes (extended)
- Country: United States
- Languages: English; Italian; Portuguese; Indonesian
- Budget: $60 million
- Box office: $205 million

Eat Pray Love is a 2010 American biographical romantic drama film, directed and co-written by Ryan Murphy and starring Julia Roberts as Elizabeth Gilbert. It is based on Gilbert's 2006 memoir, and was released in the United States on August 13, 2010, to mixed reviews from critics. The film was a financial success, grossing $205 million against a $60 million budget.

== Plot ==
Elizabeth "Liz" Gilbert has been married for eight years, owns a house, and has a successful career. Despite her seemingly stable life, she feels lost and confused, longing for something more meaningful. Liz asks her husband Stephen for a divorce, which he struggles to accept. She has a brief affair with David, a young actor. Newly divorced and facing uncertainty, Liz embarks on a transformative journey to Italy, India, and Bali, seeking self-discovery.

During her travels, Liz discovers the joy of Italian cuisine, indulging in pasta and gelato for four months. She meets a new Swedish friend who introduces her to a private Italian tutor, and they share a Thanksgiving celebration before Liz heads to India. In India, Liz stays at an ashram where she delves into the power of prayer and is tasked with humbling chores like scrubbing floors. "Texas Richard" becomes both a challenge and a support system for her. As her time at the ashram comes to an end, Liz moves on to Bali, Indonesia.

In Bali, Indonesia, Liz reunites with Ketut, a local healer, and takes on various tasks he assigns her. While cycling, she has a run-in with Felipe, a Brazilian, and seeks treatment for an injury from Wayan, a village healer. During her recovery, she meets Armenia, who encourages her to join in village festivities. There, Felipe apologizes for the accident, and they strike up a conversation. Despite Armenia's attempt to set her up with someone else, Liz finds herself drawn to Felipe. They spend time together, and Liz organizes a fundraiser for Wayan's house, raising over US$18,000.

When Felipe proposes, Liz agrees, but as they spend time alone in a remote location, she becomes overwhelmed and breaks off the engagement. As she prepares to leave Bali, Liz seeks advice from Ketut, who urges her to embrace love without fear. Inspired, Liz rushes to Felipe and confesses her love for him, finally finding inner peace and the balance of true love unexpectedly.

== Cast ==
- Julia Roberts as Elizabeth "Liz" Gilbert
- Javier Bardem as Felipe, a Brazilian businessman Liz falls in love with on her journey
- James Franco as David, the man Liz has an intense relationship with while she is finalizing her divorce
- Richard Jenkins as Richard, a Texan Liz befriends at an Indian ashram
- Viola Davis as Delia Shiraz, Liz's best friend
- Billy Crudup as Stephen, Liz's ex-husband
- Hadi Subiyanto as Ketut Liyer, Liz's advisor in Indonesia
- Mike O'Malley as Andy Shiraz, Delia's husband
- Tuva Novotny as Sofi, Liz's Swedish best friend in Rome
- Luca Argentero as Giovanni, Liz's Italian tutor and Sofi's love interest
- Sophie Thompson as Corella, a woman at the Indian ashram
- Rushita Singh as Tulsi, Liz's friend at the ashram
- Christine Hakim as Wayan, Liz's best friend in Indonesia
- Arlene Tur as Armenia
- Gita Reddy as The Guru
- Laksmi De-Neefe Suardana and Dewi De-Neefe Suardana as the owners of Indus restaurant.

== Production ==
Eat Pray Love began principal photography in August 2009. Filming locations include New York City (United States), Rome and Naples (Italy), Delhi and Pataudi (India), Ubud and Padang-Padang Beach at Bali (Indonesia).

Hindu leaders voiced concern over the production of the film and advocated the use of spiritual consultants to ensure that the film conveyed an accurate reflection of life in an ashram. Both Salon.com and The New York Post have suggested that Gurumayi Chidvilasananda was the guru featured in the film and in the book by Elizabeth Gilbert on which the film was based, though Gilbert herself did not identify the ashram or the guru by name. The two Balinese lead characters (Ketut Liyer and Wayan) are played by Indonesian actors Hadi Subiyanto and Christine Hakim, respectively.

== Reception ==
=== Box office ===
The film debuted at #2 behind The Expendables with $23,104,523. It had the highest debut at the box office with Roberts in a lead role since America's Sweethearts in 2001. During its initial ten-day run, revenue grew to a total of $47.2 million. The competing film The Expendables features Eric Roberts, Julia Roberts' brother, and the box office pitted Roberts versus Roberts. Hollywood.com commented that "sibling rivalry is rarely as publicly manifested" as this. The film, produced on a $60 million budget, grossed $80.6 million in the United States and Canada, for a worldwide total of $205 million.

=== Critical response ===
On Rotten Tomatoes, the film has a 34% approval rating based on 204 reviews with an average rating of 5.2/10. The site's critical consensus reads "The scenery is nice to look at, and Julia Roberts is as luminous as ever, but without the spiritual and emotional weight of the book that inspired it, Eat Pray Love is too shallow to resonate." On Metacritic, it has a score of 50 based on reviews from 39 critics, indicating "mixed or average" reviews. Audiences surveyed by CinemaScore gave the film a grade B on scale of A to F.

Peter Bradshaw of The Guardian gave the film 1 out of 5 stars, beginning his review "Sit, watch, groan. Yawn, fidget, stretch. Eat Snickers, pray for end of dire film about Julia Roberts' emotional growth, love the fact it can't last forever. Wince, daydream, frown. Resent script, resent acting, resent dinky tripartite structure. Grit teeth, clench fists, focus on plot. Troubled traveller Julia finds fulfilment through exotic foreign cuisine, exotic foreign religion, sex with exotic foreign Javier Bardem. Film patronises Italians, Indians, Indonesians. Julia finds spirituality, rejects rat race, gives Balinese therapist 16 grand to buy house. Balinese therapist is grateful, thankful, humble. Sigh, blink, sniff. Check watch, groan, slump." In 2025 Bradshaw retrospectively downgraded his score to zero stars, describing it as "pure moviemaking horror" and stating "I can feel myself worrying that zero is generous."

Wesley Morris of The Boston Globe gave the film 3 out of 4 stars while writing "Is it a romantic comedy? Is it a chick flick? This is silly, since, in truth, it's neither. It's simply a Julia Roberts movie, often a lovely one." San Francisco Chronicle film critic Mick LaSalle overall positively reviewed the film and praised Murphy's "sensitive and tasteful direction" as it "finds way to illuminate and amplify Gilbert's thoughts and emotions, which are central to the story".

Negative reviews appeared in The Chicago Reader, in which Andrea Gronvall commented that the film is "ass-numbingly wrong", and Rolling Stone, in which Peter Travers referred to watching it as "being trapped with a person of privilege who won't stop with the whine whine whine." Humor website Something Awful ran a scathing review. Martin R. "Vargo" Schneider highlighted several aspects of the film that he considered completely unrealistic. Political columnist Maureen Dowd termed the film "navel-gazing drivel" in October 2010.

The BBC's Mark Kermode listed the film as 4th on his list of Worst Films of the Year, saying: "Eat Pray Love... vomit. A film with the message that learning to love yourself is the greatest love of all, although I think the people who made that film loved themselves rather too much."

In The Huffington Post, critic Jenna Busch wrote:

Eat Pray Love is ultimately charming and inspirational. Though it doesn't have quite the impact of the book, it will likely leave you pondering your life choices and forgiving your flaws. It will certainly have you forgiving the few flaws in the film. The performances are just too fantastic, the vistas too lovely to pay too much attention to anything else.

In the Italian newspaper La Repubblica, journalist Curzio Maltese wrote:

How many platitudes fit in a two-hour-twenty-minutes-long movie? Several, if Eat Pray Love is anything to go by. Sure, if TV director Ryan Murphy's directing weren't so slow, even more would. For example, in the long part shot in Rome, the mandolin is conspicuously absent. There's a shower of spaghetti, Italians who gesticulate all the time and shout vulgarities as they follow foreign girls around. [...] There's lots of pizza. But no mandolin. Why? [...] Goes without saying that the story would've surprised us more if Julia had found out how well one can eat in Mumbai, how much they pray in Indonesia, and how one can fall in love even in the Grande Raccordo Anulare, possibly avoiding rush hour.

The film received generally negative reviews in the Italian press.

== Merchandising ==
Marketers for the film created over 400 merchandising tie-ins. Products included Eat Pray Love–themed jewelry, perfume, tea, gelato machines, an oversized Indonesian bench, prayer beads, and a bamboo window shade. World Market department store opened an entire section in all of their locations devoted to merchandise tied to the movie.

The Home Shopping Network ran 72 straight hours of programming featuring Eat Pray Love products around the time of the film's release. The decision to market such a wide range of products, hardly any of which were actually featured in the film, brought criticism from The Philadelphia Inquirer, The Washington Post and The Huffington Post.
