= Elizabeth Gilbert =

American journalist and author (born 1969)

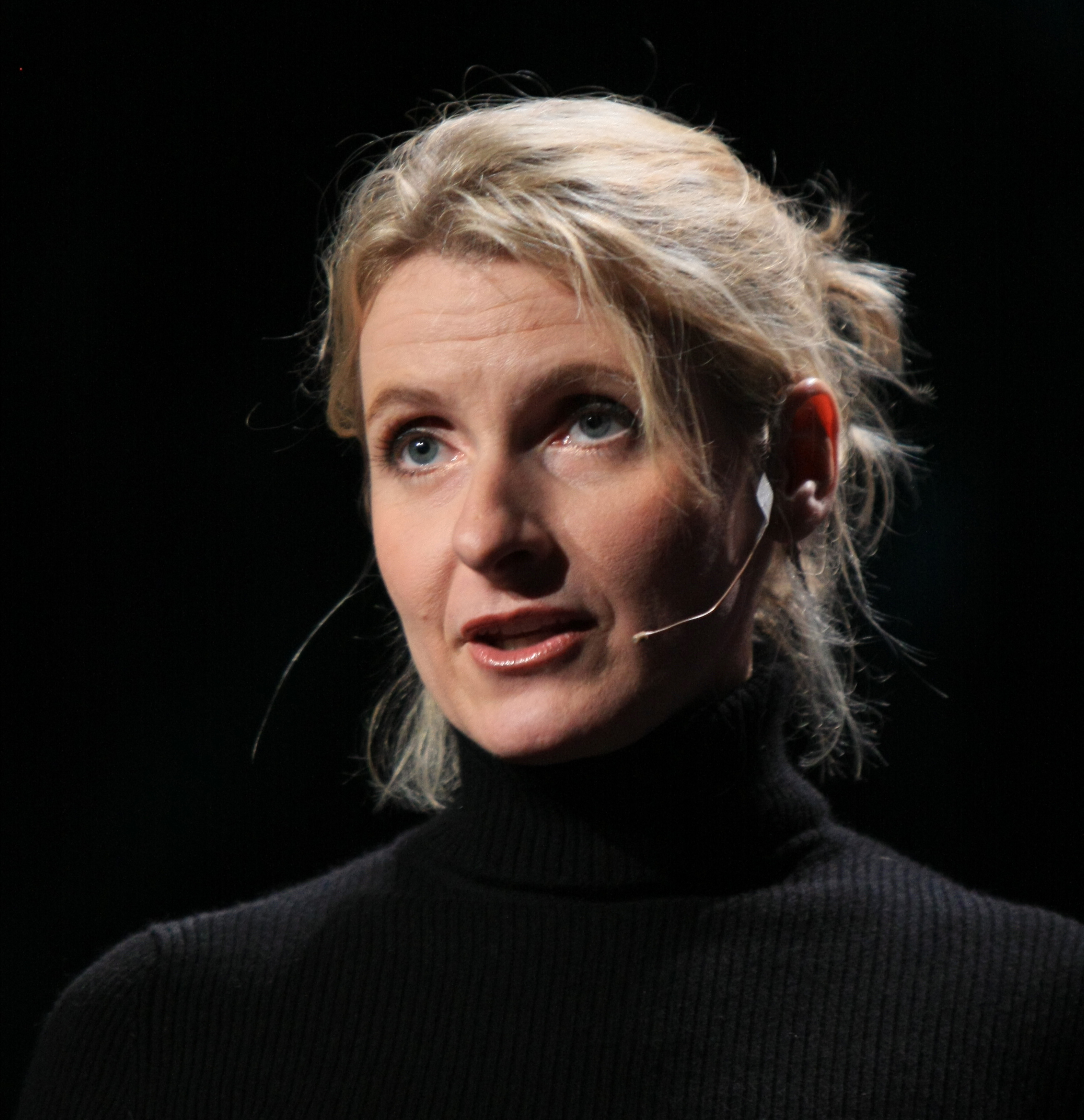
- Gilbert in 2009
- Born: July 18, 1969 (age 57); Waterbury, Connecticut, U.S.
- Education: New York University
- Occupations: Journalist; novelist; memoirist
- Spouses: Michael Cooper (m. 1994; div. 2002) José Nunes (m. 2007; div. 2016)
- Partner: Rayya Elias (2016–2018)
- Writing career
- Period: 1997–present
- Genres: Fiction; memoir
- Website: elizabethgilbert.com

Elizabeth Gilbert (born July 18, 1969) is an American journalist and author. Her 2006 memoir, Eat, Pray, Love, has sold over 12 million copies and has been translated into over 30 languages. The book was also made into a film of the same name in 2010.

== Early life and education ==
Gilbert was born in Waterbury, Connecticut, in 1969. Her father, John Gilbert, was a chemical engineer at Uniroyal; her mother, Carole, was a nurse who established a Planned Parenthood clinic.

When Gilbert was four, her parents bought a Christmas tree farm in Litchfield, Connecticut. The family lived in the countryside with no immediate neighbors, and they did not own a television or record player. Consequently, the family read a great deal, and Gilbert and her older sister, Catherine Gilbert Murdock, entertained themselves by writing books and plays. Gilbert has said that her parents were not hippies, but modern pioneers: "My parents are the only people I've ever known who made their own goat's-milk yogurt and voted for Reagan twice. That's a Venn diagram that doesn't include anyone else."

Gilbert attended New York University. She resisted taking literature classes and writing workshops. As she said in an interview, "I never thought that the best place for me to find my voice would be in a room filled with twenty other people trying to find their voices. I was a big moralist about it, actually. I felt that if I was writing on my own, I didn't need a class, and if I wasn't writing on my own, I didn't deserve one." Then, instead of attending graduate school, she decided to create her own education through work and travel.

After college, Gilbert moved to Philadelphia and worked as a waitress and bartender to save up enough money to travel. In a New York Times interview, she said she was influenced by Ernest Hemingway's early career and his short story collection In Our Time. Gilbert believed that writers find stories not in a seminar room, but through exploring the world. While storing up experiences for her writing, she held jobs including trail cook, bartender, and waitress.

== Career ==
=== Journalism ===
Esquire published Gilbert's short story "Pilgrims" in 1993, under the headline "The Debut of an American Writer". She was the first unpublished short story writer to debut in Esquire since Norman Mailer. This led to steady work as a journalist for a variety of national magazines, including Spin, GQ, the New York Times Magazine, Allure, Real Simple, and Travel + Leisure. She stated in the memoir Eat, Pray, Love that she made a career as a highly-paid freelance writer.

Her 1997 GQ article "The Muse of the Coyote Ugly Saloon", a memoir of Gilbert's time as a bartender at the first Coyote Ugly table dancing bar, located in the East Village section of New York City, was the basis for the feature film Coyote Ugly (2000).

She adapted her 1998 GQ article "The Last American Man" into a biography of the modern woodsman and naturalist Eustace Conway in The Last American Man. "The Ghost", a profile of Hank Williams III published by GQ in 2000, was included in Best American Magazine Writing 2001.

=== Books ===
Gilbert's first book, Pilgrims (Houghton Mifflin 1997), a collection of short stories, received the Pushcart Prize and was a finalist for the PEN/Hemingway Award. This was followed by her novel Stern Men (Houghton Mifflin 2000), selected by The New York Times as a "Notable Book". In 2002, she published The Last American Man (2002), which was nominated for the National Book Award in non-fiction.

==== Eat, Pray, Love ====
In 2006, Gilbert published Eat, Pray, Love: One Woman's Search for Everything Across Italy, India and Indonesia (Viking, 2006), a chronicle of her year of "spiritual and personal exploration" spent traveling abroad. She financed her world travel for the book with a $200,000 publisher's advance after pitching the concept in a book proposal. The best-seller has been critiqued by some writers as "priv-lit" ("a literature of privilege") and a "calculated business decision". The memoir appeared on the New York Times Best Seller list of nonfiction in the spring of 2006, and was still #2 on the list 88 weeks later, in October 2008. It was optioned for a film by Columbia Pictures, which released Eat Pray Love, starring Julia Roberts as Gilbert, on August 13, 2010. Gilbert appeared on The Oprah Winfrey Show in 2007, and has reappeared on the show to further discuss the book, her philosophy, and the film. She was named one of the 100 most influential people in the world by Time magazine, in 2008, and in 2016 she was included in Oprah's SuperSoul 100 list of visionaries and influential leaders.

==== Committed ====
Gilbert's fifth book, Committed: A Skeptic Makes Peace with Marriage, was released by Viking Press in January 2010. The book is somewhat of a sequel to Eat, Pray, Love in that it takes up Gilbert's life story where her bestseller left off. Committed also reveals Gilbert's decision to marry Jose Nunes (referred to in the book as Felipe), a Brazilian man she met in Manu, Indonesia. The book is an examination of the institution of marriage from several historical and modern perspectives—including those of people, particularly women, reluctant to marry. In the book, Gilbert also includes perspectives on same-sex marriage and compares this to interracial marriage prior to the 1970s.

In 2012, she republished At Home on the Range, a 1947 cookbook written by her great-grandmother, food columnist Margaret Yardley Potter. Gilbert published her second novel, The Signature of All Things, in 2013.

==== Big Magic ====
In 2015, Gilbert published Big Magic: Creative Living Beyond Fear, a self-help book that provides instructions on how to live a life as creative as hers. The book is broken down into six sections: Courage, Enchantment, Permission, Persistence, Trust, and Divinity. Advice in Big Magic focuses on overcoming self-doubt, avoiding perfectionism, and agenda setting, among other topics. Gilbert continued the work started in Big Magic with her Magic Lessons podcast in which she interviews famous creatives including Brené Brown and Sarah Jones.

A review of Big Magic in Slate stated that most of the advice in the book is matter-of-fact, but that, "Gilbert comes bearing reports from a new world where untold splendors lie waiting for those bold and hard-working enough to claim them. What's unclear is how many could successfully follow on her trail." The Seattle Times described the book as, "funny, perceptive and full of down-to-earth advice".

==== Other works ====
Gilbert released City of Girls: A Novel in 2019. The Guardian called it "a glorious, multilayered celebration of womanhood".

Publication of her next work, The Snow Forest, was halted in June 2023, because of backlash against the book's setting, Russia. Mary Rasenberger, CEO of the Authors Guild, commented: "Gilbert heard and empathized with the pain of her readers in Ukraine, and we respect her decision that she does not want to bring more harm to her Ukrainian readers."

Gilbert's third memoir, All the Way to the River: Love, Loss, and Liberation, was released on September 9, 2025 by Riverhead Books. This book covers the period of her life after that of Big Magic. The book details her adjustment to newfound fame and fortune after the optioning of Eat Pray Love, the breakup of her marriage, her relationship with Rayya Elias, her unsuccessful attempted murder of Elias, Elias's death from cancer, and Gilbert's realization that she is a sex addict. Of the book, The New Yorker's Jia Tolentino noted, "[w]hen Gilbert confesses that she planned to murder her, Rayya calls it 'fucking awesome,' exclaiming, 'You found your darkness, dude!'"

=== Literary influences ===
In an interview, Gilbert mentioned The Wizard of Oz with nostalgia, adding, "I am a writer today because I learned to love reading as a child—and mostly on account of the Oz books ..." She has said she was particularly influenced by Charles Dickens, and has noted this in many interviews. She identifies Marcus Aurelius's Meditations as her favorite book on philosophy. She also declared Jack Gilbert (no relation) as "the poet laureate of my life" when she succeeded him as a writer-in-residence at the University of Tennessee in 2006.

== Philanthropy ==
In 2015, Gilbert and several other authors including Cheryl Strayed participated in fundraising efforts for Syrian refugees which raised over $1 million in 31 hours. In 2016, Gilbert shared a video of herself singing a karaoke version of Bonnie Tyler's "Total Eclipse of the Heart" to raise money for BlinkNow Foundation, an organization inspired in part by Eat, Pray, Love.

== Personal life ==
In a 2015 article for The New York Times titled "Confessions of a Seduction Addict", Gilbert wrote that she "careened from one intimate entanglement to the next—dozens of them—without so much as a day off between romances". She acknowledged, "Seduction was never a casual sport for me; it was more like a heist, adrenalizing and urgent. I would plan the heist for months, scouting out the target, looking for unguarded entries. Then I would break into his deepest vault, steal all his emotional currency and spend it on myself." She realized that, "I might indeed win the man eventually. But over time (and it wouldn't take long), his unquenchable infatuation for me would fade, as his attention returned to everyday matters. This always left me feeling abandoned and invisible; love that could be quenched was not nearly enough love for me".

Gilbert was married to Michael Cooper, whom she met while working at the Coyote Ugly Saloon, from 1994 to 2002. The marriage ended when she left Cooper in 2002.

In 2007, Gilbert married José Nunes, whom she had met in Bali while on the travels she describes in Eat, Pray, Love. They lived in Frenchtown, New Jersey; together they ran a large Asian import store called Two Buttons until they sold it in 2015.

In July 2016, Gilbert announced that she and Nunes were separating, saying that the split was "very amicable" and that their reasons were "very personal". In September 2016, Gilbert disclosed that she was in a relationship with her female best friend, writer Rayya Elias, and that this relationship was related to the breakup of her marriage. The relationship began because Gilbert realized her feelings for Elias, following the latter's terminal cancer diagnosis. In June 2017, the two celebrated a commitment ceremony with close family and friends. The ceremony was not legally binding, and later in their relationship Gilbert plotted to kill Elias, driven by drugs and exhaustion, though cancer beat her to the punch. Elias died in January 2018.

In March 2019, Gilbert said she was in a relationship with United Kingdom-born photographer Simon MacArthur, who was also a close friend of Elias. In an interview in February 2020, she shared that they were no longer together, calling the relationship "short lived".

== Works ==
=== Story collections ===
- Pilgrims (1997)

=== Novels ===
- Stern Men (2000)
- The Signature of All Things (2013) ISBN 978-0143125846
- City of Girls (2019) ISBN 978-1594634734

=== Biographies ===
- The Last American Man (2002) ISBN 978-0142002834

=== Memoirs ===
- Eat, Pray, Love: One Woman's Search for Everything Across Italy, India and Indonesia (2006) ISBN 978-0143038412
- Committed: A Skeptic Makes Peace with Marriage (2010) ISBN 978-0143118701
- Big Magic: Creative Living Beyond Fear (2015) ISBN 978-1594634727
- All the Way to the River: Love, Loss, and Liberation (2025) ISBN 978-0593540985

=== Notable articles ===
- "The Muse of Coyote Ugly Saloon". GQ (March 1997)
- "The Last American Man". GQ (February 1998)
- "Confessions of a Seduction Addict". New York Times Magazine (June 2015)

=== As contributor ===
- The KGB Bar Reader: Buckle Bunnies (1998)
- Why I Write: Thoughts on the Craft of Fiction (contributor) (1999)
- The Best American Magazine Writing 2001: The Ghost (2001)
- The Best American Magazine Writing 2003: Lucky Jim (2003)
