= National Inclusion Project =

US non-profit organization

National Inclusion Project (formerly Bubel Aiken Foundation)
- Founded: July 28, 2003; 23 years ago
- Founder: Clay Aiken, Diane Bubel
- Type: 501(c)(3) Charitable Organization
- Location(s): PO Box 110104; Research Triangle Park, NC 27709
- Region served: United States
- Key people: Nick Leisey; (Executive Director); Tonya Gillham; (Director of Development and Marketing); Aron Hall; (Director of Education and Training); Amanda Kloo; (Director of Standards and Accreditation)
- Employees: 9
- Volunteers: varies
- Website: www.inclusionproject.org

National Inclusion Project (formerly the Bubel/Aiken Foundation) is a non-profit organization, founded in 2003 by Clay Aiken and Diane Bubel, dedicated to promoting the inclusion of children with disabilities in activities with their non-disabled peers.

By providing services and financial assistance, the Project supports communities and programs in creating awareness and opportunities for full inclusion where barriers break and doors open. Its goal is to create an environment for children where inclusion is embraced.

On August 5, 2009, in an open letter from the founders, Clay Aiken and Diane Bubel stated "As we realized the impact the Foundation has already made, it became apparent that even bigger accomplishments could be on the horizon. To that end, we along with the rest of the Board decided that a new name for the Foundation would establish long-term credibility and stability. We sought a name that would signify the Foundation's position as a national leader on inclusion as well as recognize the Foundation's start and the efforts of its faithful supporters. After much thought and deliberation, we are proud to introduce the organization we co-founded as the National Inclusion Project".

== History ==
The Bubel/Aiken Foundation was founded in July 2003 by singer Clay Aiken from the hit TV show, American Idol. His interest in autism issues led him, along with Diane Bubel (whose son Michael is diagnosed with autism and was tutored by Aiken), to found the Bubel/Aiken Foundation, which supports the integration of children with disabilities into the life environment of their non-disabled peers.

The Bubel Aiken Foundation logo (circa 2003)

Initially, Aiken developed the concept of the foundation as a project to complete credit hours needed for graduation from the University of North Carolina at Charlotte. Aiken worked on the organization and set up of the Foundation while competing on American Idol and performing with the season 2 contestants during their summer tour. After receiving over $50,000 in donations to the as-yet non-existent organization, Aiken decided to follow through and make the organization a reality. On July 28, 2003, just 2 months after the end of the competition, he officially announced the creation of The Bubel/Aiken Foundation.

In October 2005 the Foundation debuted a new look for its website and a new logo described in the announcement as "The new logo abstractly displays five individuals coming together, representing five points of a star. One is unique from the rest, but is nonetheless included as part of the whole."

In a joint statement, Aiken and Bubel announced on August 5, 2009, that National Inclusion Project was the new name of the Foundation.

== Programs ==
=== Let's ALL Play ===
Let's ALL Play is a program that works in conjunction with summer camps by providing inclusive camp experiences to children with disabilities in an integrated environment alongside children without disabilities. The programs are implemented with YMCA, Boys and Girls Clubs, community and private summer camps.

The National Inclusion Project has partnered with Johns Hopkins University Center for Summer Learning to develop and pilot a summer learning curriculum that youth-serving organizations can use to offer inclusive summer camp opportunities. Mitsubishi Electric America Foundation has supported this project with a grant.

=== Grant Program ===
The Foundation has presented yearly Able to Serve awards to children with physical and mental disabilities to support their volunteer efforts. These awards are granted to fund service projects created by children with disabilities to encourage them to provide service to others.

Grants were given out through 2018 to non-profit or public community organizations whose programs focus on inclusion for ALL children. Organizations who received grants include The Salvation Army Kroc Center, San Diego, California, the Marcus Jewish Community Center of Atlanta, Georgia, and the City of Bloomington Parks and Recreation Department, Bloomington, Indiana

=== K–12 Inclusive Service Learning ===
In late 2004 the Foundation was presented with a $500,000 grant from the U.S. government to develop a K–12 curriculum for inclusion to be used in schools across the country. In addition State Farm granted $1.5 million to the Foundation to help develop a primary education curriculum focused on teaching social and life skills through service to children of all levels of ability. In January 2009 the University of Minnesota's Institute on Community Integration announced that the curriculum had completed the testing phase and was ready to be released.

== Fund Raising ==
In November 2007, Aiken was a contestant on a celebrity edition of the game show Are You Smarter Than a 5th Grader?. Playing for his Foundation, he chose to drop out after the ninth question with $300,000, despite having a copy and a save at his disposal. If he had played the tenth question, he would have won $500,000; Aiken and the 5th grader playing with him both had the correct answer.

=== Founders' Gala (formerly Champions Gala) ===
Beginning in November 2004 in Los Angeles the Foundation has hosted an annual Gala featuring dinner, live and silent auctions and entertainment. Every year special recognition is given to the "Champions of Change" honorees selected by the Foundation. They are individuals, companies or groups who have made a significant effort to promote awareness of the need for inclusion.

=== Golfing for Inclusion ===
Begun in 2008 this annual fund raiser has been held at the Country Club at Mirasol in Palm Beach Gardens, Florida. The all-day event includes a golf clinic, brunch, an afternoon of golf, dinner, live and silent auctions and entertainment. Professional golfer Wayne Player has co-hosted and conducted the golf clinics.

=== Dancing Like the Stars ===
Partnering with A Step to Gold International Ballroom, the Foundation has hosted a dance competition at the annual Southern Women's Show in Raleigh, North Carolina, since 2007. Local celebrities partner with professional ballroom dancers to win the contest. All proceeds benefit the National Inclusion Project.

=== Wrapping for Inclusion ===
The "Wrapping for Inclusion" fund raiser, sponsored by the Foundation, is a nationwide effort by volunteers who set up at malls during the holiday season to wrap presents for shoppers, raise awareness and support the National Inclusion Project.
