= NAACP Image Award for Outstanding Variety Series =

Former American television award

The NAACP Image Award for Outstanding Variety Series: arose as a category in 1994 after being part of the category Outstanding Variety Series/Special from 1988 to 1993. It ended in 1996 when it reverted to the original category Outstanding Variety Series/Special.

== Winners and nominees ==
Year	Television Series	Nominees
1994	In Living Color	
1995	The Arsenio Hall Show	
