= Clean the World =

U.S. benefit corporation

- Formation: 2010
- Type: Benefit corporation
- Headquarters: Orlando, Florida, United States
- Founder: Shawn Seipler
- Key people: Shawn Seipler (CEO)
- Website: cleantheworld.org

Clean the World is an organization that recycles hotel soap and hotel amenities. It is also the first "benefit corporation," or "B" corporation established in Orlando, Florida.

== About ==
Clean the World collects discarded soap and shampoo from the hospitality industry and other sectors that generate environmental waste and recycles it for redistribution. Once the bars and bottles of soap have been collected from hotels and shipped into the warehouse, they are then sanitized and re-packaged for distribution. Clean the World partners with the Global Soap Project, as well as more than 5000 hospitality partners and 500 event partners throughout North America. Since 2009, Clean the World has distributed more than 45 million bars of soap to children and families in 127 countries worldwide, while diverting 16 million pounds of hotel waste from North American landfills.

=== History ===
Shawn Seipler and Paul Till started Clean the World in 2009. Seipler started the company after learning that the barely used complimentary soap in his Minneapolis hotel room would be thrown away.

Seipler and Till started their company in Orlando, Florida and used meat-grinders and other kitchen utensils to cook the soap into clean bars. The first soap donor was the Holiday Inn at the Orlando International Airport. Within three years, the home business became an "international charity that ... distributed 9.5 million bars of recycled soap in 45 countries." In 2011, Laguna Beach became the first city in the United States to have all hotels participate in Clean the World.

Clean the World has helped redirect 250 tons of soap from going into Nevada landfills as of 2014. They expanded operations to Asia that same year. It now has plants in Orlando, Las Vegas, Hong Kong, India, and Montreal. By 2015, they were distributing soap in 99 different countries. Since 2009 the company has distributed over 40 million bars of soap.

The Hilton hotel chain announced in March 2019 that they would, in conjunction with Clean the World, be collecting used bars of soap from the guest rooms across their hotels to recycle them and create 1 million new bars of soap by Global Handwashing Day on October 15.
