= Jenna Busch =

American entertainment journalist

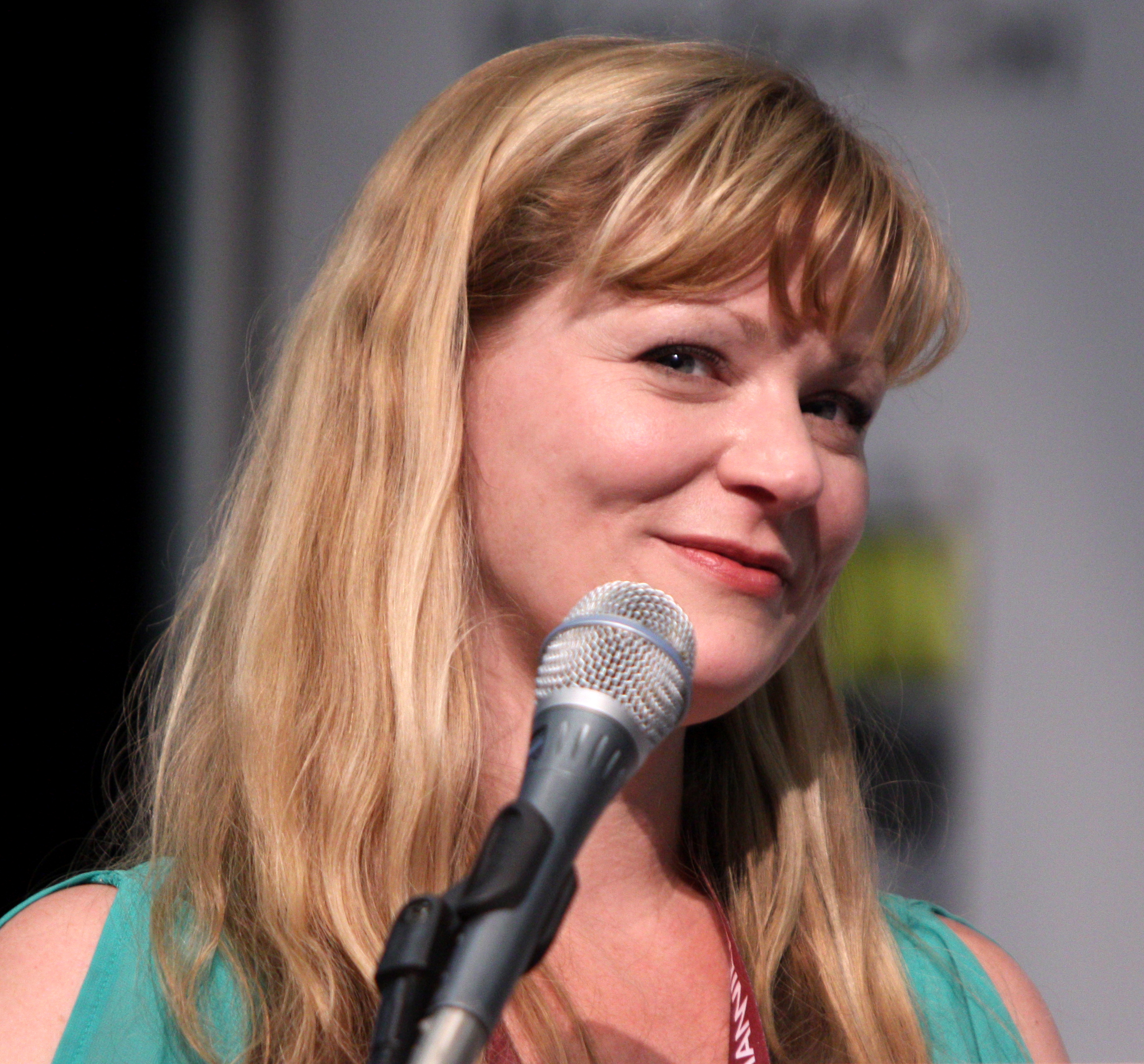
- Busch at WonderCon 2013
- Born: Jennifer Anne Busch; May 30, 1973 (age 52); Mineola, New York, U.S.
- Occupations: Web and TV host, entertainment reporter, comic book author, geek personality
- Spouse: Eric Thompson (2003-2011) divorced
- Website: girlmeetslightsaber.blogspot.com

Jennifer Anne Busch (born May 30, 1973) is an American entertainment journalist known for her work on sites like IGN, Huffington Post, Coming Soon, JoBlo, SheKnows, Collider, and Stan Lee's World of Heroes.

She is currently the co-host of the weekly entertainment web series Most Craved. Jenna frequently speaks at conventions and appeared on NPR, Al Jazeera America, The Young Turks Network, G4's Attack of the Show and Seasons 1 and 3 of Wil Wheaton and Felicia Day's Tabletop. Jenna is the creator of Legion of Leia, a website and an initiative to promote women in sci-fi. She recently contributed a chapter and sidebars to the book Star Wars Psychology.

== Career ==
Busch majored in musical theater at Syracuse University. She moved into a career as a makeup artist, working on Never Sleep Again: The Nightmare on Elm Street Story, Scream: The Inside Story and Do Not Disturb. She began working as an entertainment journalist for UGO.com in 2007. She hosted, wrote and produced a daily show for AOL called Moviefone Minute as well as doing a daily CBS Radio national spot. She became a member of the Broadcast Film Critics Association and a board member of the Broadcast Television Journalists Association.

Busch speaks and moderates at conventions and festivals around the country including San Diego Comic-Con, New York Comic-Con, WonderCon, various Wizard World conventions, DragonCon, and the Atlanta TV Festival. She has appeared in the Women of Geekdom calendar, the 2014 Celebrity Geek Calendar to benefit homeless pets, and multiple issues of the pinup magazine Cupcake Quarterly's geek and non-geek issues. She also presents at multiple award shows including The Geekies. She was nominated for a Geekie Award for Best Online Personality in 2014.

Busch co-hosted Cocktails With Stan, a weekly interview show with Stan Lee. Jenna contributed two pieces in the comic book Womanthology.
