= Eat Pray Love (book) =

2006 book by Elizabeth Gilbert

Eat Pray Love: One Woman's Search for Everything Across Italy, India, and Indonesia
- Author: Elizabeth Gilbert
- Language: English
- Subject: Spirituality; romance
- Genre: Memoir
- Publisher: Penguin
- Publication date: February 16, 2006
- Media type: Print (hardcover · paperback)
- Pages: 352 (hardcover)
- ISBN: 978-0-670-03471-0
- Dewey Decimal: 910.4 B 22
- LC Class: G154.5.G55 A3 2006

Eat Pray Love: One Woman's Search for Everything Across Italy, India and Indonesia is a 2006 memoir by American author Elizabeth Gilbert. The memoir chronicles the author's trip around the world after her divorce and what she discovered during her travels. She wrote and named the book while living at The Oliver Hotel on the downtown square in Knoxville, TN. The book remained on The New York Times Best Seller list for 187 weeks. The film version, which stars Julia Roberts, was released in theaters on August 13, 2010.

Gilbert followed up this book with Committed: A Skeptic Makes Peace with Marriage, released through Viking in January 2010. It covered her life after Eat, Pray, Love, plus an exploration of the concept of marriage.

== Story ==
At 34 years old, Elizabeth Gilbert was educated, had a home, a husband, and a successful career as a writer. She was, however, unhappy in her marriage and initiated a divorce. She then embarked on a rebound relationship that did not work out, leaving her devastated and alone. After finalizing her difficult divorce, Gilbert made the decision to spend the next year traveling the world. To gain funding she approached her publisher about writing a memoir about her travels, something that she described as "a staggering personal miracle".

She spent four months in Italy, eating and enjoying life ("Eat"). She spent three months in India, finding her spirituality ("Pray"). She ended the year in Bali, Indonesia, looking for "balance" of the two and fell in love with a Brazilian businessman ("Love"), whom she later married and divorced.

== Film adaptation ==
Columbia Pictures purchased film rights for the memoir and produced a film version under the same title. It was released on August 13, 2010. American actress Julia Roberts starred in the film; Ryan Murphy directed it. The film also stars Javier Bardem, James Franco, Richard Jenkins, and Billy Crudup. Brad Pitt and Dede Gardner of Plan B, Pitt's production company, produced the film.

== Reviews ==
Jennifer Egan of The New York Times described Gilbert's prose as "fueled by a mix of intelligence, wit and colloquial exuberance that is close to irresistible" but said that the book "drags" in the middle. She was more interested in "the awkward, unresolved stuff she must have chosen to leave out," noting that Gilbert omits the "confusion and unfinished business of real life" and that "we know how the story ends pretty much from the beginning."

Oprah Winfrey enjoyed the book, and devoted two episodes of The Oprah Winfrey Show to it.

Katie Roiphe of Slate agreed with Egan about the strength of Gilbert's writing. However, she described the journey as too fake: "too willed, too self-conscious." She stated that given the apparent artificiality of the journey, her "affection for Eat, Pray, Love is ... furtive" but that "it is a transcendently great beach book." The Washington Post's Grace Lichtenstein stated that "the only thing wrong with this readable, funny memoir of a magazine writer's yearlong travels across the world in search of pleasure and balance is that it seems so much like a Jennifer Aniston movie."

Lev Grossman of Time, however, praised the spiritual aspect of the book, stating that "to read about her struggles with a 182-verse Sanskrit chant, or her (successful) attempt to meditate while being feasted on by mosquitoes, is to come about as close as you can to enlightenment-by-proxy." He did, however, agree with Roiphe that her writing occasionally seems to be "trying too hard to be liked; one feels the belabored mechanism of her jokes."

Lori Leibovich of Salon agreed with several other reviewers about the strength of Gilbert's storytelling. She agreed with Egan as well that Gilbert seems to have an unlimited amount of luck, saying, "Her good fortune seems limitless" and asking "Is it possible for one person to be this lucky?"

Entertainment Weekly's Jessica Shaw said that "despite a few cringe-worthy turns ... Gilbert's journey is well worth taking." Don Lattin of the San Francisco Chronicle agreed with Egan that the story was weakest while she was in India and questioned the complete veracity of the book. Barbara Fisher of The Boston Globe also praised Gilbert's writing, stating that "she describes with intense visual, palpable detail. She is the epic poet of ecstasy."

In early 2010, the feminist magazine Bitch published a critical review and social commentary called "Eat, Pray, Spend". Authors Joshunda Sanders and Diana Barnes-Brown wrote that "Eat, Pray, Love is not the first book of its kind, but it is a perfect example of the genre of priv-lit: literature or media whose expressed goal is one of spiritual, existential, or philosophical enlightenment contingent upon women's hard work, commitment, and patience, but whose actual barriers to entry are primarily financial." The genre, they argued, positions women as inherently and deeply flawed and offers "no real solutions for the astronomically high tariffs—both financial and social—that exclude all but the most fortunate among us from participating."

== See also ==
- Yoga tourism
- Yoga and orientalism
