= Magic Johnson Foundation =

American nonprofit organization

The Magic Johnson Foundation (MJF), founded in 1991 by NBA Hall of Famer Earvin "Magic" Johnson, has grown from an HIV/AIDS awareness nonprofit into a national organization focused on empowering urban and ethnically diverse communities. The Foundation operates around three core pillars: health and wellness, education and scholarships, and community engagement. Over the years, MJF has launched numerous impactful programs, including the Taylor Michaels Scholarship Program, which has supported over 700 students pursuing higher education, and the Earvin Johnson Sr. Scholarship, established in 2023 to support students at Michigan State University.

In the area of public health, the Foundation has provided more than 40,000 free HIV screenings across the country and partnered with the AIDS Healthcare Foundation to open HIV/AIDS clinics in California and Florida. MJF also engages underserved communities through job fairs, holiday toy drives, and community technology centers. Programs such as Kids Mardi Gras and Holiday Hope have brought services and joy to thousands of families, with over 500,000 toys and holiday items distributed to more than 45,000 children. Since its founding, MJF has operated initiatives in major U.S. cities including Los Angeles, New York, Atlanta, Chicago, Houston, and Washington, D.C.
