= Stefano De Sando =

Italian actor and voice actor (born 1954)

- Born: Giuseppe De Sando; 31 July 1954 (age 72); Pizzo, Italy
- Occupations: Actor; voice actor
- Years active: 1979–present

Giuseppe "Stefano" De Sando (born 31 July 1954) is an Italian actor and voice actor.

== Biography ==
Born in Pizzo Calabro, De Sando began his acting career during the mid-1970s, when he was mentored on stage by Vittorio Gassman. He later made several appearances on film and television, acting in Alberto Negrin's docudrama Mussolini and I and working multiple times with director Lamberto Bava. In 2007 he played the role of Apuleius in Giulio Base's Imperium: Pompeii (2007). De Sando is well known as a voice dubber as he is the official Italian voice of Robert De Niro, dubbing over him for the first time in The Mission, later taking on the role definitively since Ferruccio Amendola’s death in 2001. Other actors De Sando dubs include James Gandolfini, Ciarán Hinds, Ben Kingsley, John Goodman and many more.

Some of De Sando’s popular character dubbing roles include Walter White (portrayed by Bryan Cranston) in Breaking Bad, Tony Soprano (portrayed by James Gandolfini) in The Sopranos and Théoden (portrayed by Bernard Hill) in The Lord of the Rings film franchise. His animated dubbing roles include Clayton in Tarzan, Don Lino in Shark Tale, Buck Strickland in King of the Hill and various characters in The Simpsons.

== Filmography ==
=== Cinema ===
Year	Title	Role	Notes
1979	Atsalut pader	Mutilato	
1986	Il ragazzo del Pony Express	Dinner host	
1989	Street Kids	Prison director	
1995	Carogne - Ciro and Me		
1997	Gli inaffidabili	Rino	
1997	Ma Shamal - Ritorno al deserto		
2001	Blek Giek	Ferrante	
2002	Kidnapped	Police Inspector	Alternate edit of Rabid Dogs
2019	A mano disarmata	General Bertelli	
2020	D.N.A. - Decisamente non adatti	Rodomonti	

=== Television ===
Year	Title	Role	Notes
1982	La bisbetica domata		TV play
1985	Mussolini and I	Dino Grandi	TV miniseries
1985	Caccia al ladro d'autore	Pino	TV miniseries
1986	Strada senza uscita		TV miniseries
1987–1988	Night Shift	Argentini	TV series
1988	Until Death	Maresciallo	TV film, part of the horror cable series Brivido Giallo
1989	School of Fear	Vice Principal	TV film
1989	Rally		TV miniseries
1990	Non aprite all'uomo nero		TV film
1991	L'ispettore Sarti	Casolato	TV series (season 1; episode 3)
1992	Pronto soccorso	Enzo's father	4 episodes (season 2)
1998	Una donna per amico	Alessio Beltrami	2 episodes (season 1)
2001	Il maresciallo Rocca	Rocco Cafiero	2 episodes (season 3)
2002	Valeria medico legale		1 episode (season 2)
2002	Commesse	User	1 episode (season 2)
2002	Amici miei		TV play
2003	Enchantment	Augusto Conti	4 episodes (season 6)
2004	Elisa di Rivombrosa	Giovanni Conforti	4 episodes (season 1)
2007	Imperium: Pompeii	Appuleius	TV film
2008	Quo vadis, baby?		TV miniseries
2010	Two Cheaters and a Half		TV miniseries
2014	Lobby Girls		TV web-series

== Voice work ==
Year	Title	Role	Notes
2002	Johan Padan a la descoverta de le Americhe	Captain Gonzalo Narvaez	Animated film
2003	Chi ha paura?...	Prosecution	Animated film
2011	L'era legale	Narrator	Voice-over
2012	Pinocchio	The Ringmaster	Animated film
2016	L'uomo che non cambiò la storia	Narrator	Voice-over
2020	Captain T - La Condanna della Consuetudine	Voice-over	Short film
2022	Dante (film)	Narrator	Voice-over

=== Dubbing ===
==== Films (Animation, Italian dub) ====
Year	Title	Role(s)	Ref
1995	Farewell to Nostradamus	Douglas	
1998	The Prince of Egypt	Aaron	
1998	Pocahontas II: Journey to a New World	King James	
1998	Mulan	General Li	
1999	Tarzan	Clayton	
1999	The Adventures of Elmo in Grouchland	Count von Count	
2001	Spirited Away	Kamaji	
2003	The Jungle Book 2	Shere Khan	
2004	Shark Tale	Don Lino	
2005	Tarzan II	Zugor	
2005	Chicken Little	Melvin	
2005	Once Upon a Halloween	Cauldron	
2006	The Wild	Stan	
2007	Go West! A Lucky Luke Adventure	Edgar Crook	
2008	Madagascar: Escape 2 Africa	Makunga	
2008	Bolt	Vinnie	
2008	Igor	Dr. Glickenstein	
2008	The Tale of Despereaux	Botticelli Remorso	
2008	Dead Space: Downfall	Captain Matthius	
2010	Legend of the Guardians: The Owls of Ga'Hoole	Metal Beak	
2013	Monsters University	Professor Derek Knight	
2013	Escape from Planet Earth	General William T. Shanker	
2014	Planes: Fire & Rescue	Blade Ranger	
2016	Finding Dory	Fluke	
2016	Rock Dog	Fleetwood Yak	
2017	Richard the Stork	Don Corvoleone	
2018	Isle of Dogs	Chief	
2019	Arctic Dogs	Otto Von Walrus	
2021	The Addams Family 2	Dr. Rupert Crewried	
2023	Migration	Uncle Dan	

==== Films (Live action, Italian dub) ====
Year	Title	Role(s)	Original actor	Ref
1986	The Mission	Rodrigo Mendoza	Robert De Niro	
1986	The Morning After	Turner Kendall	Jeff Bridges	
1986	Little Shop of Horrors	Orin Scrivello	Steve Martin	
1986	Aliens	Hudson	Bill Paxton	
1987	Wall Street	Carl Fox	Martin Sheen	
1987	Raising Arizona	Herbert I. McDunnough	Nicolas Cage	
1988	Die Hard	Dwayne T. Robinson	Paul Gleason	
1989	The Killer	Ah Jong	Chow Yun-fat	
1989	Batman	Alexander Knox	Robert Wuhl	
1990	Air America	Jack Neely	Art LaFleur	
1991	Homicide	Tim Sullivan	William H. Macy	
1992	Peter's Friends	Peter Morton	Stephen Fry	
1992	Red Rock West	Michael Williams	Nicolas Cage	
1993	Jurassic Park	Alan Grant	Sam Neill	
1994	Bullets Over Broadway	Cheech	Chazz Palminteri	
1994	Oleanna	John	William H. Macy	
1994	The New Age	Peter Witner	Peter Weller	
1994	The Jungle Book	Geoffrey Brydon	Sam Neill	
1994	Nell	Dr. Alexander Paley	Richard Libertini	
1995	One Hundred and One Nights	Le Mari de la Star-Fantasme en Croisière	Robert De Niro	
1995	The Usual Suspects	Dave Kujan	Chazz Palminteri	
1997	Oscar and Lucinda	Dennis Hasset	Ciarán Hinds	
1997	Deceiver	Edward Kennesaw	Michael Rooker	
1997	Titanic	Thomas Andrews	Victor Garber	
1998	Lock, Stock and Two Smoking Barrels	Big Chris	Vinnie Jones	
1998	With Friends Like These...	Armand Minetti	David Strathairn	
1998	The Giraffe	Charles Kaminski	David Strathairn	
1998	Ronin	Sam Regazolli	Robert De Niro	
1998	The Thin Red Line	James Staros	Elias Koteas	
1998	Blues Brothers 2000	"Mighty" Mack McTeer	John Goodman	
1998	City of Angels	Jordan Ferris	Colm Feore	
1998	Hurlyburly	Phil	Chazz Palminteri	
1998	Phoenix	Mike Henshaw	Anthony LaPaglia	
1998	Black Dog	Jack Crews	Patrick Swayze	
1999	The Limey	Wilson	Terence Stamp	
1999	Breakfast of Champions	Harry LeSabre	Nick Nolte	
1999	Snow Falling on Cedars	Alvin Hooks	James Rebhorn	
1999	The Virgin Suicides	Dr. Horniker	Danny DeVito	
1999	Gloria	Sean	Mike Starr	
1999	A Midsummer Night's Dream	Theseus	David Strathairn	
1999	Sweet and Lowdown	Al Torrio	Anthony LaPaglia	
1999	The Mummy	Ardeth Bay	Oded Fehr	
2000	Memento	Teddy Gammell	Joe Pantoliano	
2000	Meet the Parents	Jack Byrnes	Robert De Niro	
2000	The Adventures of Rocky and Bullwinkle	Fearless Leader	Robert De Niro	
2000	Coyote Ugly	Bill Sanford	John Goodman	
2000	Little Nicky	Mr. Beefy	Robert Smigel	
2000	Trixie	Drummond Avery	Nick Nolte	
2001	The Curse of the Jade Scorpion	Voltan	David Ogden Stiers	
2001	Apocalypse Now Redux	William "Bill" Kilgore	Robert Duvall	
2001	15 Minutes	Eddie Flemming	Robert De Niro	
2001	The Score	Nick Wells	Robert De Niro	
2001	Triumph of Love	Hermocrates	Ben Kingsley	
2001	High Heels and Low Lifes	Alan Mason	Kevin McNally	
2001	Jurassic Park III	Alan Grant	Sam Neill	
2001	The Last Castle	Ed Winter	James Gandolfini	
2001	The Mexican	Leroy / Winston Baldry	James Gandolfini	
2001	The Man Who Wasn't There	Big Dave Brewster	James Gandolfini	
2001	The Mummy Returns	Ardeth Bay	Oded Fehr	
2001	The Majestic	Ernie Cole	Jeffrey DeMunn	
2001	I Am Sam	Robert	Stanley DeSantis	
2001	Enemy at the Gates	Erwin König	Ed Harris	
2001	A Beautiful Mind	William Parcher	Ed Harris	
2001	Scary Movie 2	Father McFeely	James Woods	
2001	Tempted	Dot Collins	Mike Starr	
2002	The Lord of the Rings: The Two Towers	Théoden	Bernard Hill	
2002	Changing Lanes	Walter Arnell	Richard Jenkins	
2002	Showtime	Mitch Preston	Robert De Niro	
2002	Analyze That	Paul Vitti	Robert De Niro	
2002	City by the Sea	Vincent LaMarca	Robert De Niro	
2003	Paycheck	John Wolfe	Colm Feore	
2003	The Lord of the Rings: The Return of the King	Théoden	Bernard Hill	
2003	Mystic River	Dave Boyle	Tim Robbins	
2003	Calendar Girls	Eddie Reynoldson	George Costigan	
2003	The Matrix Reloaded	Captain Roland	David Roberts	
2003	The Matrix Revolutions	Captain Roland	David Roberts	
2003	Once Upon a Time in America	David "Noodles" Aaronson (2003 redub)	Robert De Niro	
2003	Seabiscuit	Tom Smith	Chris Cooper	
2003	The Order	Driscoll	Peter Weller	
2003	Scary Movie 3	Carson Ward	Timothy Stack	
2004	Lemony Snicket's A Series of Unfortunate Events	Dr. Montgomery Montgomery	Billy Connolly	
2004	The Bourne Supremacy	Martin Marshall	Tomas Arana	
2004	Thunderbirds	The Hood	Ben Kingsley	
2004	Hotel Rwanda	Colonel Oliver	Nick Nolte	
2004	Along Came Polly	Leland Van Lew	Bryan Brown	
2004	The Chronicles of Riddick	Lord Marshal	Colm Feore	
2004	Godsend	Richard Wells	Robert De Niro	
2004	Meet the Fockers	Jack Byrnes	Robert De Niro	
2004	The Bridge of San Luis Rey	Diego de Parada	Robert De Niro	
2004	Elvis Has Left the Building	Sal	Mike Starr	
2004	Downfall	Helmuth Weidling	Michael Mendl	
2004	I Heart Huckabees	Mr. Hooten	Richard Jenkins	
2004	Look What's Happened Now	Raj Chauhan	Amitabh Bachchan	
2004	Surviving Christmas	Tom Valco	James Gandolfini	
2004	Stage Beauty	Thomas Betterton	Tom Wilkinson	
2004	Jaws	Quint (2004 redub)	Robert Shaw	
2004	Troy	Menelaus	Brendan Gleeson	
2005	Don't Come Knocking	Howard Spence	Sam Shepard	
2005	Hide and Seek	David Callaway	Robert De Niro	
2005	Manslaughter	Carsten	Jesper Christensen	
2005	The Wedding Date	Victor Ellis	Peter Egan	
2005	Batman Begins	Carmine Falcone	Tom Wilkinson	
2005	War of the Worlds	Harlan Ogilvy	Tim Robbins	
2005	Romance & Cigarettes	Nick Murder	James Gandolfini	
2005	Missing	Ray Tower (2005 redub)	Charles Cioffi	
2005	The Perfect Man	Ben Cooper	Chris Noth	
2005	Hostage	Walter Smith	Kevin Pollak	
2005	V for Vendetta	Gordon Deitrich	Stephen Fry	
2005	The Mechanik	William Burton	Ben Cross	
2006	The Good Shepherd	Bill Sullivan	Robert De Niro	
2006	Bandidas	Bill Buck	Sam Shepard	
2006	The Departed	Oliver Queenan	Martin Sheen	
2006	Bobby	Jack Stevens	Martin Sheen	
2006	X-Men: The Last Stand	Cain Marko / Juggernaut	Vinnie Jones	
2006	Garfield: A Tail of Two Kitties	Lord Manfred Dargis	Billy Connolly	
2006	The Lives of Others	Bruno Hempf	Thomas Thieme	
2006	A Guide to Recognizing Your Saints	Monty Montiel	Chazz Palminteri	
2006	All the King's Men	Tiny Duffy	James Gandolfini	
2006	Lonely Hearts	Charles Hildebrandt	James Gandolfini	
2006	Lucky Number Slevin	The Rabbi	Ben Kingsley	
2006	Scary Movie 4	Phil McGraw	Phil McGraw	
2006	A Good Year	Sir Nigel	Kenneth Cranham	
2006	Scoop	Mr. Malcolm	Charles Dance	
2006	Never Say Goodbye	Samarjit Talwar	Amitabh Bachchan	
2007	The Assassination of Jesse James by the Coward Robert Ford	Frank James	Sam Shepard	
2007	Sweeney Todd: The Demon Barber of Fleet Street	Beadle Bamford	Timothy Spall	
2007	Death Sentence	Bones Darley	John Goodman	
2007	Hitman	Mikhail Belicoff	Ulrich Thomsen	
2007	Breach	Robert Hanssen	Chris Cooper	
2007	Bordertown	George Morgan	Martin Sheen	
2007	The Kingdom	Robert Grace	Richard Jenkins	
2007	Transformers	Tom Banachek	Michael O'Neill	
2007	Fracture	Joe Lobruto	David Strathairn	
2007	Stardust	Captain Shakespeare	Robert De Niro	
2007	Less Sugar	Buddhadev Gupta	Amitabh Bachchan	
2007	Margot at the Wedding	Dick Koosman	Ciarán Hinds	
2007	The Godfather	Vito Corleone (2007 redub)	Marlon Brando	
2007	The Lark Farm	Nazim	Mohammad Bakri	
2008	The Chronicles of Narnia: Prince Caspian	Lord Scythley	Simón Andreu	
2008	Changeling	James E. Davis	Colm Feore	
2008	The Mysteries of Pittsburgh	Joe Bechstein	Nick Nolte	
2008	The Spiderwick Chronicles	Mulgarath	Nick Nolte	
2008	Tropic Thunder	Four Leaf Tayback	Nick Nolte	
2008	The X-Files: I Want to Believe	Joseph "Father Joe" Crissman	Billy Connolly	
2008	How to Lose Friends & Alienate People	Lawrence Maddox	Danny Huston	
2008	Australia	King Carney	Bryan Brown	
2008	What Just Happened	Ben	Robert De Niro	
2008	Righteous Kill	Tom "Turk" Cowan	Robert De Niro	
2008	Quantum of Solace	Mr. White	Jesper Christensen	
2008	Milk	David B. Goodstein	Howard Rosenman	
2009	Berlin 36	Hans von Tschammer und Osten	Thomas Thieme	
2009	The Taking of Pelham 123	Mayor of New York	James Gandolfini	
2009	Everybody's Fine	Frank Goode	Robert De Niro	
2009	The Other Woman	Sheldon	Michael Cristofer	
2009	Brothers	Hank Cahill	Sam Shepard	
2009	In the Electric Mist	Julie "Baby Feet" Balboni	John Goodman	
2009	Pope Joan	Pope Sergius II	John Goodman	
2009	Boogie Woogie	Art Spindle	Danny Huston	
2009	Life During Wartime	Bill Maplewood	Ciarán Hinds	
2009	The Haunting in Connecticut	Nicholas Popescu	Elias Koteas	
2009	Terminator Salvation	General Hugh Ashdown	Michael Ironside	
2010	Edge of Darkness	Darius Jedburgh	Ben Kingsley	
2010	Prince of Persia: The Sands of Time	Prince Nizam	Ray Winstone	
2010	London Boulevard	Rob Gant	Ray Winstone	
2010	The Chronicles of Narnia: The Voyage of the Dawn Treader	Lord Drinian	Gary Sweet	
2010	Machete	Senator John McLaughlin	Robert De Niro	
2010	Stone	Jack Mabry	Robert De Niro	
2010	Little Fockers	Jack Byrnes	Robert De Niro	
2010	The Expendables	Tool	Mickey Rourke	
2010	A View of Love	Sergio Bartoli	Toni Servillo	
2010	The Debt	Stefan Gold (1997)	Tom Wilkinson	
2010	Fair Game	Sam Plame	Sam Shepard	
2010	Let Me In	Thomas	Richard Jenkins	
2010	Three Cards	Venkat Subramaniam	Amitabh Bachchan	
2011	Harry Potter and the Deathly Hallows – Part 2	Aberforth Dumbledore	Ciarán Hinds	
2011	Sherlock Holmes: A Game of Shadows	Mycroft Holmes	Stephen Fry	
2011	Fast Five	Hernan Reyes	Joaquim de Almeida	
2011	Limitless	Carl Van Loon	Robert De Niro	
2011	Killer Elite	Hunter	Robert De Niro	
2011	New Year's Eve	Stan Harris	Robert De Niro	
2011	The Muppets	Tex Richman	Chris Cooper	
2011	My Week with Marilyn	Hugh Perceval	Michael Kitchen	
2011	Tinker Tailor Soldier Spy	George Smiley	Gary Oldman	
2011	Rise of the Planet of the Apes	Charles Rodman	John Lithgow	
2011	Kill the Irishman	John Nardi	Vincent D'Onofrio	
2011	Water for Elephants	Cecil	E.E. Bell	
2011	Contagion	Lyle Haggerty	Bryan Cranston	
2011	Lessons of a Dream	Dr. Roman Bosch	Thomas Thieme	
2011	Green Lantern	Abin Sur	Temuera Morrison	
2011	Margaret	Mitchell	Stephen Adly Guirgis	
2011	Drive	Bernie Rose	Albert Brooks	
2012	Safe House	Harlan Whitford	Sam Shepard	
2012	Killing Them Softly	Mickey	James Gandolfini	
2012	Zero Dark Thirty	CIA Director	James Gandolfini	
2012	Upside Down	Bob Boruchowitz	Timothy Spall	
2012	The Company You Keep	Henry Osborne	Brendan Gleeson	
2012	John Carter	Colonel Powell	Bryan Cranston	
2012	Argo	Jack O'Donnell	Bryan Cranston	
2012	Lincoln	Thaddeus Stevens	Tommy Lee Jones	
2012	Hitchcock	Whitfield Cook	Danny Huston	
2012	Flight	Harling Mays	John Goodman	
2012	The Samaritan	Xavier	Tom Wilkinson	
2012	The Campaign	Glenn Motch	John Lithgow	
2012	The Cabin in the Woods	Gary Sitterson	Richard Jenkins	
2012	Jack Reacher	Alex Rodin	Richard Jenkins	
2012	The Woman in Black	Sam Daily	Ciarán Hinds	
2012	Red Lights	Simon Silver	Robert De Niro	
2012	Being Flynn	Jonathan Flynn	Robert De Niro	
2012	Silver Linings Playbook	Pat Solitano Sr.	Robert De Niro	
2012	Freelancers	Joe Sarcone	Robert De Niro	
2012	The Dictator	Tamir	Ben Kingsley	
2013	The Incredible Burt Wonderstone	Doug Munny	James Gandolfini	
2013	Enough Said	Albert	James Gandolfini	
2013	The Big Wedding	Don Griffin	Robert De Niro	
2013	Killing Season	Benjamin Ford	Robert De Niro	
2013	The Family	Giovanni Manzoni / Fred Blake	Robert De Niro	
2013	Last Vegas	Paddy Connors	Robert De Niro	
2013	American Hustle	Victor Tellegio	Robert De Niro	
2013	Grudge Match	Billy "The Kid" McDonnen	Robert De Niro	
2013	Star Trek Into Darkness	Alexander Marcus	Peter Weller	
2013	The Disappearance of Eleanor Rigby	Spencer Ludlow	Ciarán Hinds	
2013	White House Down	Eli Raphelson	Richard Jenkins	
2013	Iron Man 3	Trevor Slattery	Ben Kingsley	
2013	The Physician	Ibn Sina	Ben Kingsley	
2013	Ender's Game	Mazer Rackham	Ben Kingsley	
2014	The Adventurer: The Curse of the Midas Box	Otto Luger	Sam Neill	
2014	The Imitation Game	Commander Alastair Denniston	Charles Dance	
2014	Grace of Monaco	Aristotle Onassis	Robert Lindsay	
2014	The Bag Man	Dragna	Robert De Niro	
2014	Godzilla	Joe Brody	Bryan Cranston	
2014	Exodus: Gods and Kings	Nun	Ben Kingsley	
2014	Big Eyes	Dick Nolan	Danny Huston	
2014	Selma	Albert J. Lingo	Stephen Root	
2014	Skin Trade	Captain Costello	Peter Weller	
2014	The Drop	Marvin Stipler	James Gandolfini	
2015	Ithaca	Willie Grogan	Sam Shepard	
2015	Spectre	Mr. White	Jesper Christensen	
2015	The Intern	Ben Whittaker	Robert De Niro	
2015	Heist	Francis "The Pope" Silva	Robert De Niro	
2015	Joy	Rudy Mangano	Robert De Niro	
2015	Ted 2	Tom Jessup	John Carroll Lynch	
2015	Unfinished Business	Timothy McWinters	Tom Wilkinson	
2015	Frankenstein	Victor Frankenstein	Danny Huston	
2015	Run All Night	Shawn Maguire	Ed Harris	
2015	Hitman: Agent 47	Piotr Litvenko	Ciarán Hinds	
2015	Victor Frankenstein	Baron Frankenstein	Charles Dance	
2015	Love the Coopers	Sam Cooper	John Goodman	
2016	Collide	Geran	Ben Kingsley	
2016	In Dubious Battle	Mr. Anderson	Sam Shepard	
2016	Me Before You	Steven Traynor	Charles Dance	
2016	The Hollars	Don Hollar	Richard Jenkins	
2016	Why Him?	Ned Fleming	Bryan Cranston	
2016	Independence Day: Resurgence	Reese Tanner	Patrick St. Esprit	
2016	Silence	Alessandro Valignano	Ciarán Hinds	
2016	Bleed for This	Angelo Pazienza	Ciarán Hinds	
2016	Hell or High Water	Marcus Hamilton	Jeff Bridges	
2016	Dirty Grandpa	Dick Kelly	Robert De Niro	
2016	Deepwater Horizon	Robert Kaluza	Brad Leland	
2016	Captain Fantastic	Jack Bertrang	Frank Langella	
2016	Patriots Day	Ed Davis	John Goodman	
2016	Gods of Egypt	Osiris	Bryan Brown	
2017	War Machine	Hamid Karzai	Ben Kingsley	
2017	Security	Charlie	Ben Kingsley	
2017	The Disaster Artist	Bryan Cranston	Bryan Cranston	
2017	Darkest Hour	Winston Churchill	Gary Oldman	
2017	Once Upon a Time in Venice	Dave Phillips	John Goodman	
2017	Valerian and the City of a Thousand Planets	Igon Siruss	John Goodman	
2017	Crooked House	Chief Inspector Taverner	Terence Stamp	
2018	Red Sparrow	Colonel Zakharov	Ciarán Hinds	
2018	Stan & Ollie	Hal Roach	Danny Huston	
2018	The Professor	Peter Matthew	Danny Huston	
2018	Backstabbing for Beginners	Costa Pasaris / Pasha	Ben Kingsley	
2018	Operation Finale	Adolf Eichmann	Ben Kingsley	
2018	Head Full of Honey	Amadeus	Nick Nolte	
2019	Extremely Wicked, Shockingly Evil and Vile	Mike Fisher	Terry Kinney	
2019	Cold Pursuit	John Gipsky	John Doman	
2019	Joker	Murray Franklin	Robert De Niro	
2019	The Irishman	Frank Sheeran	Robert De Niro	
2019	El Camino: A Breaking Bad Movie	Walter White	Bryan Cranston	
2019	Angel Has Fallen	Clay Banning	Nick Nolte	
2019	Gemini Man	Del Patterson	Ralph Brown	
2019	The Prodigy	Arthur Jacobson	Colm Feore	
2019	Captive State	William Mulligan	John Goodman	
2019	Io	Dr. Harry Walden	Danny Huston	
2020	The War with Grandpa	Ed Marino	Robert De Niro	
2020	The Comeback Trail	Max Barber	Robert De Niro	
2020	Mank	Herman J. Mankiewicz	Gary Oldman	
2020	The One and Only Ivan	Mack	Bryan Cranston	
2021	Shang-Chi and the Legend of the Ten Rings	Trevor Slattery	Ben Kingsley	
2021	Operation Mincemeat	Winston Churchill	Simon Russell Beale	
2021	Nightmare Alley	Ezra Grindle	Richard Jenkins	
2022	All Quiet on the Western Front	General Friedrichs	Devid Striesow	
2022	Amsterdam	Gilbert Dillenbeck	Robert De Niro	
2022	Savage Salvation	Mike Church	Robert De Niro	
2022	Jurassic World Dominion	Alan Grant	Sam Neill	
2023	Anyone But You	Roger	Bryan Brown	
2023	Killers of the Flower Moon	William King Hale	Robert De Niro	
2023	About My Father	Salvo Maniscalco	Robert De Niro	
2023	The Pope's Exorcist	Bishop Lumumba	Cornell John	
2023	Indiana Jones and the Dial of Destiny	Sallah	John Rhys-Davies	
2023	In the Land of Saints and Sinners	Vinnie O'Shea	Ciarán Hinds	
2023	Fast X	Hernan Reyes	Joaquim de Almeida	
2024	Horizon: An American Saga – Chapter 1	Colonel Albert Houghton	Danny Huston	
2024	The Crow	Vincent Roeg	Danny Huston	
2024	Argylle	Director Ritter	Bryan Cranston	
2024	The First Omen	Father Harris	Charles Dance	

==== Television (Animation, Italian dub) ====
Year	Title	Role(s)	Notes	Ref
1992–1993	The Addams Family	Gomez Addams	Main cast	
1994–present	The Simpsons	Superintendent Chalmers	1 episode (season 4)	
1994–present	The Simpsons	Fat Tony	Recurring role (seasons 33+)	
1994–present	The Simpsons	Various characters	Recurring role	
1997–1998	Spawn	Jason Wynn	Recurring role	
2001–2008	Evil Con Carne	Hector Con Carne	Main cast	
2002–2004	Grim & Evil	Hector Con Carne	Recurring role	
2003–2017	King of the Hill	Buck Strickland	Recurring role (seasons 1–6, 8–9)	
2005	The Muppets' Wizard of Oz	Johnny Fiama	TV film	
2006–2016	Family Guy	James Woods	Recurring role (seasons 4–14)	
2007–2011	Legend of the Dragon	The Zodiac Master	Main cast	
2008	Armitage III	Gordon	TV series	
2015–2020	BoJack Horseman	Lenny Turteltaub	Recurring role	
2016–2018	Trollhunters: Tales of Arcadia	Vendel	Recurring role	

==== Television (Live action, Italian dub) ====
Year	Title	Role(s)	Notes	Original actor	Ref
1996	Undertow	Lyle Yates	TV film	Charles Dance	
2001–2008	The Sopranos	Tony Soprano	Main cast	James Gandolfini	
2005	Shadows in the Sun	Andrew Benton	TV film	John Rhys-Davies	
2006	Pope John Paul I: The Smile of God	Jean-Marie Villot	TV film	José María Blanco	
2008–2013	Breaking Bad	Walter White	Main cast	Bryan Cranston	
2012	30 Rock	Robert De Niro	1 episode (season 5x12)	Robert De Niro	
2015	The Eichmann Show	Leo Hurwitz	TV film	Anthony LaPaglia	
2022	Better Call Saul	Walter White	2 episodes (season 6)	Bryan Cranston	
2022–present	The Santa Clauses	Scott Calvin	Main cast	Tim Allen	

==== Video games (Italian dub) ====
Year	Title	Role(s)	Ref
1999	Tarzan	Clayton	
