= Nemescu =

Nemescu is a Romanian surname that may refer to:

- Cristian Nemescu, Romanian film director
- Octavian Nemescu, Romania music composer
