= Marilena from P7 =

- The poster of the film (without text).
- Directed by: Cristian Nemescu
- Written by: Tudor Voican; Cristian Nemescu
- Produced by: Cristian Nemescu; Ada Solomon (exec. prod.)
- Starring: Mădălina Ghițescu; Gabriel Huian
- Edited by: Cătălin Cristuțiu
- Music by: Andrei Toncu
- Distributed by: MediaPro Pictures
- Release dates: May 2006 (Cannes); 4 June 2006 (TIFF)
- Running time: 45 minutes
- Country: Romania
- Language: Romanian
- Budget: $35,000

Marilena from P7 (Romanian: Marilena de la P7) is a medium-length Romanian film, directed by Cristian Nemescu. First released in 2006, it was also nominated the same year for the Semaine de la critique section of the 59th Cannes Film Festival.

Being Cristian Nemescu's last completed project, the film stars Mădălina Ghițescu as Marilena and Gabriel Huian as Andrei. Originally, the film was intended to be used as an exercise, and was not supposed to be longer than seven minutes. In the end, the project evolved to an unusual length of 45 minutes; the film's approach also turned from comedy to teenage love. Reception from the public was favorable – it impressed through its unitary view and the way the screenplay, picture and sound combine into a new and organic way, by using innovative, unusual techniques.

== Plot ==
In a suburb of Bucharest, a 13-year-old boy, Andrei (Gabriel Huian), together with some of his friends, watches the prostitutes' show every night from a rooftop and how they are being taken by drivers. The boy falls in love with one of the girls, called Marilena (Mădălina Ghițescu), and finds out that he needs a decent sum of money in order to approach her. Thus, he steals his father's (Gabriel Spahiu) salary and goes to the prostitutes' meeting place. Marilena's pimp (Andi Vasluianu) is also present, and only agrees to send Marilena and another prostitute with the boy to a nearby pub, where the Rom Elvis is singing (played by the singer Elvis Romano, who translated Elvis Presley's lyrics into his own language). The prostitutes play with Andrei, telling him that he needs a car in order to date them, then they leave. The boy asks Marilena for her phone number, and she writes something in his hand.

Andrei sends a dedication for "Marilena from P7", to the local radio station. The prostitute is in an old man's house, listening to the radio, and the song is Are You Lonesome Tonight?, sung by Elvis Presley.

Among her clients, Marilena falls in love with a man, nicknamed Giani (Cătălin Paraschiv). One night, however, she spots Giani in his car in front of a store, accompanied by another woman, and becomes very discouraged.

Andrei finds a way to get hold of a car and plans to steal his father's trolleybus. He manages to do so, together with his friends. His father sees him and starts following the boys with another driver, his colleague. Arriving at the prostitutes' meeting place, the boys cannot find Marilena. Andrei recognizes Giani's car parked in front of block P7, so he goes in.

Marilena and Giani were in fact in her apartment; the girl goes to the restroom for a minute. Andrei manages to sneak into the apartment, and watches how, while still talking to Giani, Marilena cuts her jugular vein. After realizing what had happened, Giani becomes frightened and runs away; the pimp sees him leaving in a rush, so he goes to the apartment to see what happened. Meanwhile, Andrei goes into the room and looks down at Marilena who is lying down, with blood spilled over her. The news about Marilena's suicide spread fast around the neighborhood.

== Cast ==
=== Lead roles ===
- Marilena is played by the Romanian actress Mădălina Ghițescu (born July 29, 1978), became known to the Bucharest public for the roles she played at the Casandra Theater Studio (Romanian: Studioul de teatru "Casandra") and The Very Small Theater (Romanian: Teatrul Foarte Mic).
- Andrei was played by Gabriel Huian (untrained actor, previously appearing in a video clip that caught the director's attention). He was Cristian Nemescu's preferred choice from the beginning, however a rigorous casting still took place. Apparently attracted to Mădălina Ghițescu, Huian showed a different attitude than that of other candidates, which only convinced the director further.

=== Other roles ===
- Mihai, Andrei's brother played by Cristi Olesher
- Andrei's mother played by Aura Călărașu
- Andrei's father played by Gabriel Spahiu
- The pimp played by Andi Vasluianu
- Giani played by Cătălin Paraschiv

== Production ==
=== From project to production ===
The film's idea resulted from a small scale exercise between Nemescu and Liviu Marghidan when they were in university in 2003. The original idea belonged to Cătălin Mitulescu and Andreei Vălean; the only part of the original story that was kept is that of a group of boys trying to steal a trolleybus in order to get to some prostitutes.

Initially the film was planned as a short fiction, the project evolving during 2005. At the time, Nemescu also had planned what would later become the feature film California Dreamin', impossible to film at that moment, deciding that Marilena from P7 could prove a useful exercise for both director and actors. Thus the screenplay was rewritten and filming started with a very reduced budget of only US $14,000, which was collected by Nemescu by participating at various film festivals, with older short fictions. During development, however, the film received new funds, though still modest ones, thus the actors and a part of the team accepted to work for free.

Filming also took place in 2005, near the marketplace of the Bucharest neighborhood Rahova. The chosen area raised a few difficulties related to safety. However, the production benefited from its picturesque view, rendering the scenography and the original music unnecessary. The omnipresent manele also found their way into the movie, as background music.

In order for the story to go as it should, we needed a 'low-income' area. At the same time, the place also needed to be visually pleasant, and to meet our needs from the technical point of view – meaning it should be large enough for a trolleybus to fit in, and it should also look plausible. For almost a full week we looked around the whole Bucharest. Being in Rahova, we arrived in a place where there were some blocks painted by Mayor Marian Vanghelie, and behind those there was a ghetto – yes, that's the term – but it was a very picturesque place, which was good for what we wanted.

— Cristian Nemescu

For a long period of time the project was entitled Trolley Blues; Cristian Nemescu gave up this title, worrying that there might be a large discrepancy between the equivocal name and the actual, very direct content of the movie.

=== Post-production ===
The entire filmmaking process was much more complex than that of most Romanian movies made after 1948. The picture stands out through the use of various effects, such as split-screen, and the use of hand-held filming.

The film's music and sound was also thoroughly post-processed by the project's sound designer, Andrei Toncu, to improve the quality of the recordings, because the budget did not allow for complex equipment to be used, and for creative interest. The movie's background music has reduced volume, following the emotional evolution of the characters—Toncu combining the background music (recorded with, or without intention) and a series of effects characteristic to electronic music and musique concrète. However, a few distinct moments can be observed in the film's music, either composed by Andrei Toncu (Andrei imagining stealing the trolleybus), or already existing recordings, edited so that they would integrate into the movie's atmosphere (Elvis Presley's dedication is dynamically equalized to suggest the shift from one radio to another). Another scene in which multiple layers of sound were used was the radio show heard in Giani's car about the breeding of Memestra brassicae moths.

== Reception ==
=== Public reception ===
Marilena from P7 participated at the 59th Cannes Film Festival, along with two other Romanian films (Cătălin Mitulescu's The Way I Spent the End of the World and Corneliu Porumboiu's 12:08 East of Bucharest) and was nominated for the Semaine de la critique section of the French festival.

Very well received by the different categories of the public, from critics to publishers, and simple spectators, Corneliu Porumboiu's film '12:08 East of Bucharest' [...] Just as well was received, especially by young people, Cristian Nemescu's movie, 'Marilena from P7' (a melancholic ghetto tragedy, with a stolen trolleybus... for reaching the girl's heart, who is a gentle and honest mistress, the story of initiation and the price to pay for wanting to find out faster, what comes with age).

— Larisa Turea, about Cannes 2006, in the newspaper Timpul, May 30

Cristian Nemescu's 'Marilena from P7' is a medium-length film, which at Cannes was viewed by a hall full of people, and which was intensely applauded. It was also said that it is movie without mistake. A shocking story about a ghetto from the outskirts of Bucharest (where, for example, an old man, scourged by life, slick and misogynist, plants his little garden on the rooftop of a block), with a kid that would do anything - steal his parents' whole salary or even a trolleybus, for his beloved - and a lively prostitute from P7. Children actors with an ingenuous talent, and dialogs that fit together perfectly and sound natural, a splendid picture, a big hearted pimp played by Andi Vasluianu, all in one a portion of highest quality cinematography.

— Laura Popescu, in AperiTIFF, June 4

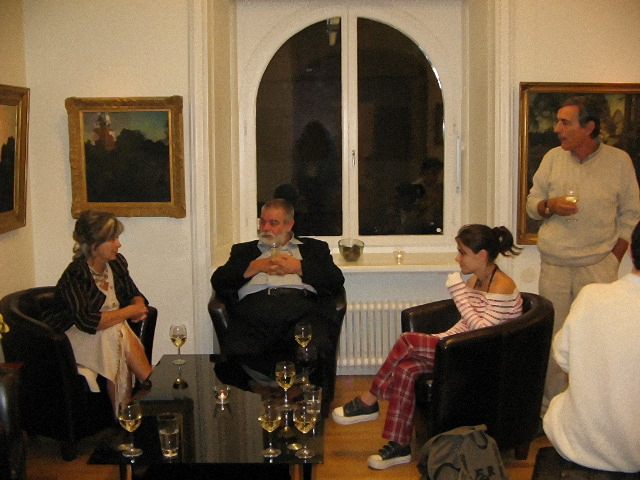
Romanian Film Days in Stockholm, 2007: Mădălina Ghițescu (right), Radu Gabrea (center).

The Romanian premiere took place on June 4, 2006, at the Transylvania International Film Festival, in Cluj-Napoca. In Bucharest, a first display of the movie was organized on September 8, 2006, in a square established for this purpose on Calea Rahovei Street. The public, as well as the critics from the country, received the movie very well, but the difficulty caused by the movie's unusual duration only allowed for the movie to be on display on a few other occasions. The same problem was encountered when the movie was sent to film festivals outside Romania, being either rejected due to the impossibly of being included in any of the standard categories or included as a short fiction (for example, at Brooklyn).

In the summer of 2006, Nemescu also started the production of California Dreamin'. The filming took place in the June–August interval. By the end of August, the film was nearing its completion; on August 24, 2006, however, Nemescu and Andrei Toncu (sound engineer for the new project as well) died in a car accident in Bucharest. Following the accident, the Romanian public, as well as those from abroad, offered wider attention to the productions of the two cineasts, including Marilena from P7, their first notable success. One year after the accident, the event was commemorated in the country through various displays, public meetings and debates. On August 24, 2007, Marilena from P7 had its premiere at Stockholm during the second Romanian Film Days. Romanian people, from the diaspora, as well as Swedish spectators, were present.

=== Critical reception ===
Marilena from P7 was seen by journalists as an attempt to attract attention to various social phenomena (prostitution, the living conditions in low-income Bucharest neighborhoods, etc.), and being presented as a documentary in some scenes. In reality, Nemescu wanted for the public to concentrate on the love story of Andrei:

All the scripts I get involved with have an essential story, and give birth to emotions that reach a lot of people's hearts. So, in this case, the thing that motivated me was the subject itself, the thoughts and emotions of a 13 year old kid who falls in love. I never had any interest to describe a social reality - like prostitution, for example - and the screenplay does not concentrate at all at 'scanning' the problems of our society. The new, innovating element consists of the child's emotions, what he feels and the human relations between the two characters. The reality of Romania is there only for decorative purposes, and I am against people struggling to present the 'Romanian dirt' through movies.

— Cristian Nemescu

I have had roles as a prostitute before. For example, the role I had to play for my graduation exam was from the play 'My Name is Isbjorg. I Am a Lioness', directed by Gianina Cărbunariu, where it was about a prostitute murdering her client. The characters should not be looked at, at a global level, thinking 'They're just prostitutes, what's the big deal? They're all the same'. No, first of all they're humans, and they have a soul. This also is the case of Marilena: if you were to popularize the subject, who is she? A prostitute and just. But the important thing is who she truly is: how she thinks, what her feelings are. [...] She is a very sensible person, just that the environment in which she lives in stops her from showing this side of her, and hide the fact that she is in love with a certain client. The unusual thing about her is that, despite the life she has, she trusts people.

— Mădălina Ghițescu

Marilena from P7 also attracted the critics' attention due to its use of explicit verbal and visual content. Cristian Nemescu said that this kind of scenes were a necessarily element for the realism of the movie, declaring himself a partisan of explicit content.

The film continues to be appreciated for its experimental nature, its camera angles and montage elements being treated in an unusual manner, while the fiction elements of the screenplay hint of magic realism. In this sense, it is important to mention that the days in the film are separated by Andrei's erotic dreams. In his dreams, the differences between him and Marilena are partially removed, either by lowering the rooftop on which the boy stands to ground level or by debarking the girl from a breast-shaped UFO that scares the neighbors away. Another fictional element is Marilena's capacity of provoking short circuits, in moments in which she is very emotionally active (e.g., when Andrei touches her in the bar's restroom, or when the whole neighborhood is cut from electricity when she cries near the high voltage electrical box).

Visually, this is how I thought this moment should have been, the split-screen being mentioned in the script. I felt the need to see everyone at the same time. If they were each at a time, it would not have had the same impact. It was a lot funnier to see all the bitches at the same time, and all the kids (masturbating) simultaneously, I like this moment.

— Cristian Nemescu

== Awards and nominations ==
The following list includes the most notable nominations and awards the film received.

Date	Outcome	Festival	Country	Section	Award
May 2006	Nominated	Cannes Film Festival	France	Semaine de la critique (Fr. "Critique week")	—
June 2006	Won	"Transylvania" International Film Festival	Romania	Premiile Zilelor filmului românesc (Ro. "Romanian Film Days Awards")	Short fiction (Cristian Nemescu)
June 2006	Nominated	Brooklyn International Film Festival	U.S.A.	Short films	—
September 2006	Won	Milano Film Festival	Italy	—	Miglior lungometraggio (It. "Best long fiction")
October 2006	Won	"Molodist" International Film Festival	Ukraine	—	Best short fiction (Cristian Nemescu); Best actress in a leading role (Mădălina Ghiţescu)
November 2006	Nominated	International Film and Television Festival "Cinéma tout écran"	Switzerland	Short movies	—
January 2007	Won	Paris Tout Court	France	Prix du public (Fr. "Viewer's Award")	Meilleur film étranger (Fr. "Best Foreign Film")
February 2007	Won	Cineasts' Union Awards	Romania	—	Award for montage (Cătălin Cristuțiu); Award for sound design (Andrei Toncu)
April 2007	Won	“Syracuse” International Film Festival	U.S.A.	—	Short fiction

== See also ==
- Romanian New Wave
