= Pivetti =

Pivetti is a family name of Italian origin. It may refer to:

- Irene Pivetti, Italian journalist and former PResident of House of Representatives
- Loris Pivetti (1908-1941), Italian aircraft pilot and captain of the Regia Aeronautica, Silver Medal of Military Valor
- Veronica Pivetti, Italian actress and voice actress
