= Milan Film Festival =

Annual film festival held in Milan, Italy

Milano Film Festival
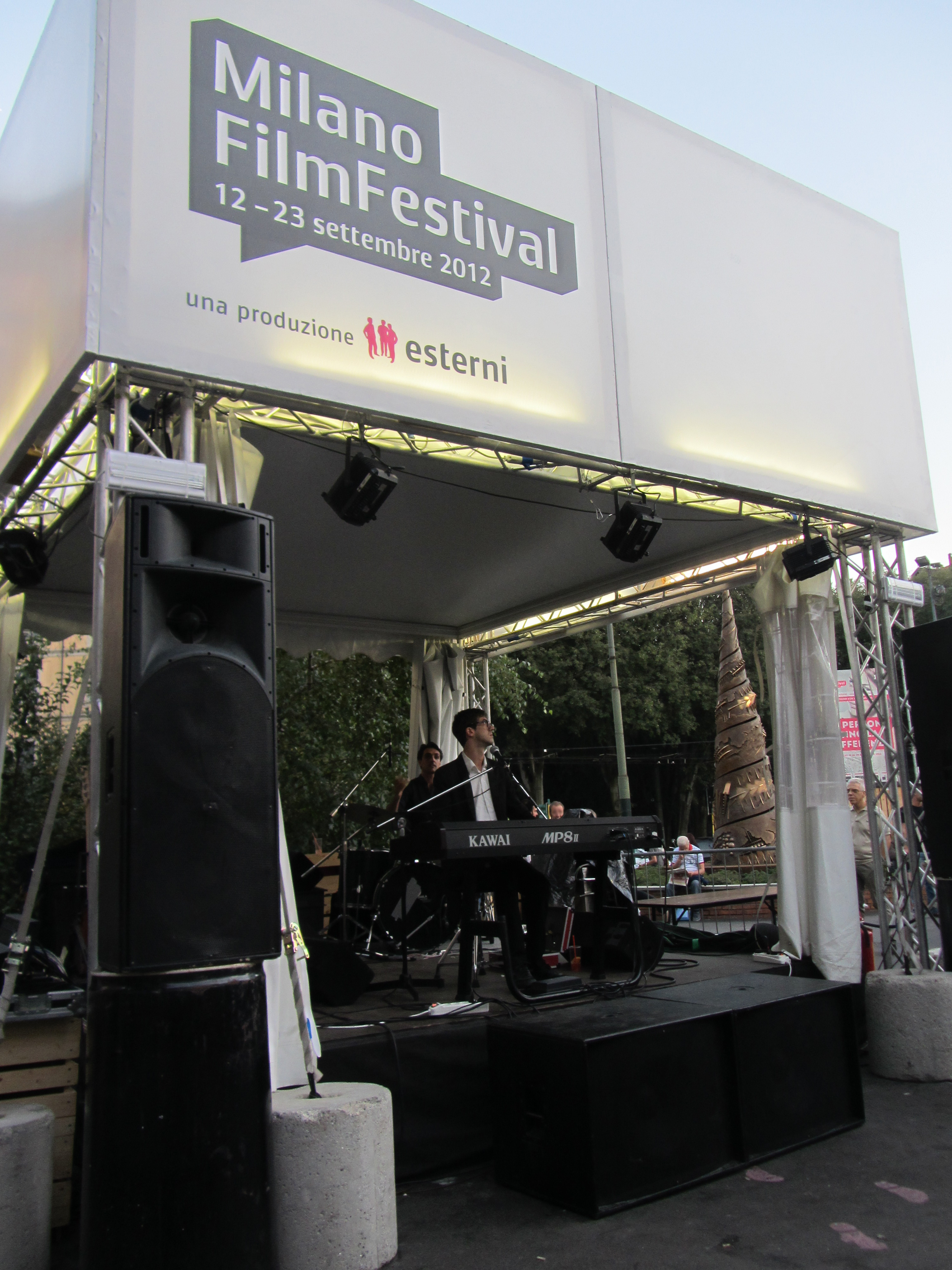
- Location: Milan, Italy
- Founded: 1996
- Directors: Vincenzo Rossini; Alessandro Beretta; Gabriele Salvatores
- Language: International
- Website: milanofilmfestival.it

Milan Film Festival (MFF, Italian: Milano Film Festival) is an annual independent film festival held since 1996 in Milan, Italy.

It was founded as a competition of only local short films, but grew to have a feature film competition program along with numerous other sections and events.

== History ==
The festival was launched in 1996 as an independent festival of short films. It became international in 1998 when it introduced a competition program. In 1999, MFF began to show feature films, and in the following year they started to compete for the Best Film Award. In 2007, the attendance exceeded 93,000.

By 2017, the number of entries for the short meter competition exceeded 2,000. As of 2018, competitions were: Best Short, Best Feature, the Outsiders, Ultra Reality, . The festival takes place in 7 locations around the city, it is supported by Milano City Council and sponsored by Lavazza brand.

The industry section is a 3-days long program which includes open talks on storytelling, filmmaking, advertising, as well as masterclasses and workshops by prominent guests of MFF. Other sections are MyScreen, dedicated to cinema in the post-Internet world, Immigration Day, Other Natures (environmental documentaries), Incontri Italiani (Italian Meetings), Milano Film Festivalino (targeted on the younger audience), etc.

The list of events include screenings of diploma works made by students of Civica Scuola di Cinema Luchino Visconti.

Since 2011, the festival has been co-directed by Alessandro Beretta and Vincenzo Rossini. In 2018, Gabriele Salvatores was invited to be a co-director along with Beretta. Among the selectors, there are critics Boris Sollazzo and Antonello Catacchio.

In 2021, the festival was relocated to Porta Venezia district. That year, a special competition ‘Senza Frontiere’ (‘Without Borders’) was launched, bringing together short and feature-length works by different directors, including both young and female directors.

== Winners ==
=== Best Film ===
- 2000: The Irish Barbecue, directed by Pete Parwich (Germany/Ireland)
- 2001: Fotograf, directed by Kazim Öz (Turkey)
- 2002: Children of Love, directed by Geoffrey Enthoven (Belgium), and Song of the Sork, directed by Jonathan Foo and Nguyen Phan Quang Binh (Vietnam)
- 2003: Nothing Is Certain, It's All In The Imagination... According To Fellini, directed by Susan Gluth (Germany)
- 2004: In the Battlefields, directed by Danielle Arbid (France/Belgium/Lebanon), and Here, directed by Zrinko Ogresta (Croatia)
- 2005: Kept and Dreamless, directed by Martín De Salvo and Vera Fogwill (Argentina/Spain/Netherlands)
- 2006: Marilena from P7, directed by Cristian Nemescu (Romania)
- 2007: Reprise, directed by Joachim Trier (Norway)
- 2008: Still Orangutans, directed by Gustavo Spolidoro (Brazil)
- 2009: Left Handed, directed by Laurence Thrush (Japan)
- 2010: On the Other Side of Life, directed by Stefanie Brockhaus and Andy Wolff (Germany)
- 2011: Italy: Love It, or Leave It, directed by Luca Ragazzi and Gustav Hofer (Italy/Germany)
- 2012: China Heavyweight, directed by Yung Chang (Canada/China)
- 2013: You and the Night, directed by Yann Gonzalez (France)
- 2025: Aimer Perdre, directed by Harpo Guit and Lenny Guit (France/Belgium)
- 2026: Where the Wind Comes From, directed by Amel Guellaty (Tunisia/France)
