= Imperium: Pompeii =

- Written by: Francesco Arlanch; Salvatore Basile
- Directed by: Giulio Base
- Starring: Lorenzo Crespi; Andrea Osvárt
- Music by: Marco Frisina
- Country of origin: Italy
- Original language: English

Production
- Cinematography: Giovanni Galasso
- Running time: 200 minutes

Original release
- Release: 2007

Imperium: Pompeii is a 2007 Italian television film and part of the Imperium series. It tells the story of the last days of Pompeii, the city buried by the eruption of Vesuvius in 79 AD. It was shot in the Empire Studios in Hammamet, Tunisia. Mass scenes involved about 3,200 extras. Anthony LaMolinara supervised the special effects of the film.

== Plot ==
Marcus a military officer goes to war and is injured and believed to be dead. In his hometown of Pompeii a bad earthquake happens, and his girlfriend Valeria and her brother Ennius are orphaned. They are sold to Quintus Laronius as slaves, but Laronius is murdered. Marcus and Valeria do all they can to solve the mystery of the murder, with the evil governor Chelidone holding them back with his love for Valeria. They eventually get Tiberius a tribune to save Valeria, Ennius and the other slaves of Quintus Laronius, who are accused of his murder, but the volcano Vesuvius erupts sending ash and pyroclastic flows to Pompeii burying it, Marcus and Valeria, and their friends cause Chelidone to die in the eruption, but they survive.

== Cast ==
- Giulio Base as Plinius based on Pliny the Elder.
- Lorenzo Crespi as Marcus, a fictional centurion.
- Andrea Osvárt as Valeria, a fictional slave girl.
- Massimo Venturiello as Chelidone/Chelidonius, a fictional magistrate.
- Francesco Pannofino as Cuspius, a fictional doctor.
- Giuliano Gemma as historical Titus, emperor of Rome.
- Maria Grazia Cucinotta as Lavinia, fictional noble woman.
- Massimo Giuliani as Vetutius/Vetuzius, probably based on the historical Pompeii tavern owner Lucius Vetutius Placidus.
- Stefano De Sando as Appuleius, a fictional magistrate.
- Maurizio Aiello as Tiberius, a fictional tribune.
- Vincenzo Bocciarelli as Anicetus, a fictional noble based on the historical Vetti.
- Sergio Fiorentini as Cornelius, a fictional aquarius.
- Antonio Serrano as Publius, a fictional noble based on the historical Vetti.
- Fabrizio Bucci as Ennius, a fictional slave.
