= John XXIII: The Pope of Peace =

2002 movie directed by Giorgio Capitani

- Written by: Francesco Scardamaglia; Massimo Cerofolini
- Directed by: Giorgio Capitani
- Starring: Edward Asner; Massimo Ghini; Claude Rich; Michael Mendl; Franco Interlenghi; Sydne Rome
- Composer: Marco Frisina
- Original language: Italian

Production
- Cinematography: Luigi Kuveiller
- Editor: Antonio Siciliano
- Running time: 208 minutes

Original release
- Network: Rai 1
- Release: 2002

John XXIII: The Pope of Peace (Italian: Papa Giovanni - Ioannes XXIII, also known as John XXIII, Pope John XXIII and Pope John XXIII: The Pope Of Peace) is a 2002 Italian television movie directed by Giorgio Capitani. The film is based on real life events of Roman Catholic Pope John XXIII.

== Plot ==
In 1958, Pope Pius XII died. Following his death, Cardinal Angelo Roncalli, overseeing his tomb at his local parish and receiving the news from his secretary Loris Capovilla, heads to the Vatican to participate in the conclave that will elect the new Pope. A bitter struggle erupts between the progressive cardinals and the conservative faction, led by Cardinals Alfredo Ottaviani and Domenico Tardini. Roncalli recalls some scenes from his past, such as his father's refusal to allow his son to become a priest, which led to an uncle supporting him; the support he offered to striking workers when he was a young priest; the secret negotiations he conducted with a Nazi ambassador to save Jews in Turkey during the World War II; and his mediation work on behalf of French bishops before President Charles de Gaulle. Shortly after, the election takes place and, under the name of John XXIII, Angelo Roncalli accedes to the pontificate. After this, numerous meetings with Anglican clergy and with the daughter of then leader of the former Soviet Union, Nikita Khrushchev, Rada Khrushcheva, took place, in the face of the war that was imminent, which forged his legacy.

== Cast ==
- Ed Asner as Angelo Giuseppe Roncalli
- Massimo Ghini as Young Angelo Roncalli
- Claude Rich as Card. Alfredo Ottaviani
- Michael Mendl as Mons. Domenico Tardini
- Franco Interlenghi as Mons. Giacomo Radini-Tedeschi
- Sydne Rome as Rada Krusciova
- Roberto Accornero as Mons. Angelo Dell'Acqua
- Jacques Sernas as Cardinal Maurice Feltin
- Paolo Gasparini as Mons. Loris Capovilla
- Ivan Bacchi as Guido Gusso
- Bianca Guaccero as Maria
- Heinz Trixner as Franz von Papen
- Sergio Fiorentini as Don Rebuzzini
- Emilio De Marchi as Uncle Saverio
- Guido Roncalli as Father Kurteff
- Vincenzo Bellanich as Cardinal Giuseppe Siri
- Alvaro Piccardi as Antonio Samorè
- Osvaldo Ruggieri as Pope Pius XI
- Tosca D'Aquino as Marianna Mazzola Roncalli
- Nicola Siri as Giovanni Roncalli
- Anna Valle as Rosa
- Mauro Rapagnani as Young Angelo Roncalli
- Petra Faksova as Sister Ivana
