= Nirakazhcha =

- Directed by: Anish J. Karrinad
- Written by: Daisy Chacko
- Starring: Mamta Mohandas; Vincenzo Bocciarelli; Manoj K. Jayan
- Release date: 27 August 2010
- Country: India
- Language: Malayalam

Nirakazhcha is a 2010 Malayalam film directed by debutant Anish J. Karrinad starring Italian actor Vincenzo Bocciarelli, Mamta Mohandas and Manoj K. Jayan in the lead roles.

Nirakazhcha tells the story of an Italian painter who visits Kerala to recreate the magnificent Raja Ravi Varma paintings. The makers of the film claim that it is an Indo – Italian production that is expected to promote the tourism and culture of both Kerala and Italy. Accordingly, the film has been shot on some of the most scenic spots in Kerala, and would also feature the spectacular landscape of Italy.

The film is expected to have a global release and would reportedly be dubbed into Tamil, Hindi, Telugu, Kannada, Spanish, Russian, German, Arabic and Italian as well.

== Cast ==
- Vincenzo Bocciarelli as Fabri
- Mamta Mohandas as Shilpa
- Manoj K. Jayan as Sreekuttan
- Jagathy Sreekumar
- Rahima
- Nicole
- Millinniala
- Libin
- Daisy Chacko
- Nedumudi Venu
- Suraj Venjarammoodu
- Vijayakumar
- Johnson Karoor
