= California Dreamin' (endless) =

California Dreamin' (2007)
- Romanian: California Dreamin' (2007)
- Directed by: Cristian Nemescu
- Written by: Tudor Voican; Cristian Nemescu; Catherine Linstrum
- Produced by: Cristian Nemescu
- Starring: Armand Assante; Jamie Elman; Răzvan Vasilescu; Maria Dinulescu
- Edited by: Liviu Marghidan
- Distributed by: Media PRO Studios
- Release dates: 17 May 2007 (Cannes); 1 June 2007 (Romania)
- Running time: 155 minutes
- Country: Romania
- Languages: Romanian; English

California Dreamin' (endless) (Romanian: California Dreamin' (nesfârșit)) is a 2007 Romanian comedy drama film directed by Cristian Nemescu, who wrote it with Tudor Voican and Catherine Linstrum. Armand Assante plays a US Marine captain escorting a NATO radar shipment across Romania by train during the 1999 bombing of Yugoslavia, and Răzvan Vasilescu the village stationmaster who holds the train because it has no customs papers. Jamie Elman, Maria Dinulescu, Alexandru Mărgineanu and Ion Sapdaru co-star. The story was loosely drawn from an incident of June 1999 at Pielești, in Dolj County, where a stationmaster stopped a NATO train for want of a customs stamp. It was produced by MediaPro Pictures, the film company of the Media Pro group founded by Adrian Sârbu, with Andrei Boncea as producer.

Nemescu was 27 when he was killed in a car crash in Bucharest on 24 August 2006, together with his sound designer Andrei Toncu, some six weeks after the shoot had wrapped and while the film was still being cut. MediaPro released it more or less as he had left it, at 155 minutes, and added the word nesfârșit to the title. The word means "endless", which is how the English title rendered it, but what was meant was "unfinished".

The film premiered in the Un Certain Regard section of the 2007 Cannes Film Festival. The jury there had first decided that an unfinished film could not be judged, then watched it and gave it the section's main prize. It went on to win at Brussels, London and Kyiv, and five Gopo Awards at home. It opened in Romania on 1 June 2007, in France and Belgium in January 2008, in the United Kingdom in April 2008 and in the United States, through IFC Films, in January 2009. Most reviewers liked it, and nearly all of them said the same thing: it would have been shorter if Nemescu had lived to finish it.

== Plot ==
Bucharest, 1944. A family is at dinner when the sirens go. They run for the shelter as American bombs fall on the city, and the boy, Doiaru, watches from the stairs. His parents, who own a small factory and are counted as German sympathisers, are waiting for the Americans to come and put things right. The Soviets get there first. The parents are taken away and he never sees them again. The episode comes back through the film in black-and-white flashbacks.

In 1999, during the NATO bombing of Yugoslavia, a train carrying a radar system is sent across Romania from Constanța towards the Serbian border. A small unit of US Marines under Captain Doug Jones rides with it, along with a few Romanian soldiers. The transport has the government's verbal blessing but nobody has bothered with customs papers; a clerk at the foreign ministry takes note of it and lets the matter drop. At Căpâlnița, a village on the plain, the stationmaster, Doiaru, halts the train. He is the local strongman. He skims goods from the freight that passes through his station and the police chief looks the other way, but this time he wants the paperwork and will not be bought. The train is shunted onto a siding.

Jones telephones anyone in Bucharest who will take his call. His request drifts from one ministry to the next and nobody will sign. Meanwhile the village makes the most of its guests. The mayor sees the Americans as investors and as a way of breaking Doiaru's grip on the place, so he stages the village's centenary all over again, though it was celebrated only months before, with a feast in the square, an Elvis impersonator and the girls from the high school. Doiaru's daughter Monica, seventeen and set on getting out, picks Sergeant David McLaren. She speaks no English, so she brings in her classmate Andrei, who does, and who is in love with her, to translate. He shades what he passes on. The three of them slip away to a party in Bucharest, where Monica and David sleep together and the city's lights go out.

The captain and the stationmaster keep circling each other. Jones goes to Doiaru's house for a quiet talk and gets nowhere; Doiaru, who follows the war on television, needles him about NATO's civilian casualties. A secretary of state arrives from the capital, and Doiaru tells him he will need the right papers too. The mayor complains to Jones that Doiaru, with the police chief behind him, has strangled the village. Jones, by now out of patience, promises to help get rid of him and addresses a meeting of villagers.

The customs papers finally come through and Doiaru is dismissed. As the Americans pull out, the quarrel the mayor has been stoking turns into a street battle between Doiaru's men and his enemies, and Doiaru is killed in front of Monica. The train leaves, and the promise of American support goes with it. A closing title says the radar reached its destination after the peace agreement had already been signed. Five years later, in a Bucharest café, Monica and Andrei, both students now, meet again.

== Cast ==
- Armand Assante as Captain Doug Jones, the officer commanding the Marine escort
- Jamie Elman as Sergeant David McLaren, his second in command
- Răzvan Vasilescu as Doiaru, the stationmaster
- Maria Dinulescu as Monica, Doiaru's daughter
- Alexandru Mărgineanu as Andrei, her classmate and interpreter
- Ion Sapdaru as the mayor
- Cătălina Mustață as Ana, the mayor's wife
- Constantin Diță as Paul, the mayor's son
- Andi Vasluianu as Marian
- Gabriel Spahiu as the union leader
- Radu Gabriel as Stelică
- Alexandru Georgescu as Corporal Tănase
- Nicodim Ungureanu as the police chief
- Teodor Corban as the secretary of state
- Ionuț Brancu as the transport minister
- Tomi Cristin as the foreign minister
- Constantin Drăgănescu as the grandfather
- Marco Assante as Benny Harper
- Bart Sidles as Bart Turner

Sabina Brânduse and Alexandru Drăgoi also appear. Florin Pătrăchioiu, the Pielești stationmaster whose story started it all, has a small part.

== Production ==
=== Development ===
Nemescu graduated from the Bucharest film school in 2003. His medium-length Marilena de la P7, about a teenage boy in love with a prostitute, was shown at Critics' Week in Cannes in 2006. He said later that after film school he kept coming up with characters without a story to hold them. Somewhere near Mihai Bravu he had been struck by village girls thrilled that a few Americans had turned up. Then he came across a news report from 1999 about a NATO train held up in a small station near Craiova, and the ideas fell into place. The train, carrying a radar, had been sent off in such a hurry that its papers were incomplete; the stationmaster went through the railway rulebook from A to Z and found something wrong, and nobody above him would take the responsibility of letting it go. It sat for half a day, reached its destination too late to be of any use, and was stopped again on the way back. Nemescu told the same story in an interview recorded for the film's website in 2006.

The stationmaster was Florin Pătrăchioiu, at Pielești station in Dolj County. By his own account, on 3 June 1999 he held a twenty-wagon train carrying American troops and mobile radar equipment for four hours because the customs stamp was missing, despite calls from the Craiova customs directorate and a warning from the transport minister, Traian Băsescu, that he would lose his job. A month later, on the way back, he kept the train for two weeks over unpaid transport fees. An inquiry found that he had acted correctly, and he was given a bonus of three months' salary. The affair ran under large headlines in Evenimentul Zilei in June and July 1999.

Nemescu wrote the screenplay with his friend Tudor Voican; Catherine Linstrum is credited as co-writer. The project dates from 2004. State funding, the usual route for a young director, did not come through, and the film was only made in 2006 when a private company took it on. That company was MediaPro Pictures, the film arm of the Media Pro group which Adrian Sârbu, a former documentary director and the founder of Pro TV, had been building since 1990. MediaPro Pictures itself dates from March 1998, when the group bought the old state film studios at Buftea and turned them into MediaPro Studios and MediaPro Pictures. The film was financed entirely in Romania, by the studio with support from the National Film Centre. Andrei Boncea, who ran MediaPro Pictures, produced; Iuliana Tarnovetchi and Dan Badea were the executive producers. The cost was put at about US$1.6 million.

=== Casting ===
Boncea sent the script to Armand Assante, who said he fell for it at the first reading. Assante had been to Romania several times before. He met Nemescu in Bulgaria, where he was shooting When Nietzsche Wept, shortly before the director left for Cannes with Marilena de la P7. Răzvan Vasilescu, one of the country's best-known stage and screen actors, was cast as Doiaru.

Pătrăchioiu came to the set, met Vasilescu and Assante, and was given a small part. He was upset the first time he saw the film, because Doiaru is written as a crook and he himself, he said, had never taken a leu from anyone. He also pointed out that the real commander had been a major named Jeff Thompson, and that he had served the American officers Russian vodka in his office. He was sorry the film was not shot at Pielești.

=== Filming ===
Shooting ran from 29 May to 21 July 2006, at Fundeni and Frunzănești in Călărași County, at Comana in Giurgiu County, and in Constanța. According to the film archive of the Romanian filmmakers' union, it was the first Romanian feature shot in Super 35. Liviu Marghidan shot it in colour, with black-and-white for the 1944 scenes, and much of it handheld. Maria Dinulescu recalled that Nemescu had prepared the film for two years and on set knew exactly what he wanted from everyone. The soundtrack includes the song "California Dreamin'", which Andrei teaches Monica line by line.

=== Nemescu's death and completion ===
On the evening of 24 August 2006, after a day in the editing room, Nemescu and Toncu took a taxi home. On the Eroilor bridge in Bucharest it was hit by a Porsche Cayenne driven by a British citizen who had gone through a red light; the technical report put the Porsche's speed at 113 km/h and the taxi's at 42. Both men were killed. Assante later said the two had just finished cutting the trailer. In their memory the producer Ada Solomon founded the NexT Cultural Society, which organises a festival of short and medium-length films.

When Nemescu died the film was a provisional cut running over three hours. MediaPro decided not to rework it. A few passages were dropped, the editor Cătălin Cristuțiu completed the cut, and the word nesfârșit was added in brackets to the title, so that nobody would take the version released for the one Nemescu would have made. Post-production took eight months in all; the sound mix and the laboratory work were done abroad. Sight & Sound noted that the producer had chosen to release the film as it stood and that "endless" should really be read as "unfinished". Some English-language listings give the title simply as Endless.

== Release ==
=== Cannes ===
The film was selected for Un Certain Regard at the 60th Cannes Film Festival in May 2007, the year Cristian Mungiu's 4 Months, 3 Weeks and 2 Days won the Palme d'Or. Pascale Ferran chaired the section's jury; Cristi Puiu was a member but had to go back to Romania before the deliberations because of a death in the family. Ferran said afterwards that the jurors had at first agreed not to consider the film, since it was unfinished and nobody could say what its director would have made of it, and that the idea collapsed when they watched it on the Friday night. At the closing ceremony on 26 May she called it the most lively and liberated film they had seen in ten days and announced the Un Certain Regard Prize. Boncea accepted it while a photograph of Nemescu was shown on screen. It was the second time a Romanian film had won the prize.

=== Theatrical ===
MediaPro Distribution released the film in Romania on 1 June 2007. Over the summer and autumn it played a long run of festivals, among them Brussels, Anonimul, Molodist in Kyiv and the London Film Festival. It opened in the Netherlands on 22 November 2007 (Filmmuseum Distributie), in France on 2 January 2008 (Bodega Films) and in Belgium on 9 January 2008 (Cinéart). Artificial Eye put it out in the United Kingdom on 11 April 2008. In the United States IFC Films opened it at the IFC Center in New York on 23 January 2009, with video on demand and a DVD to follow. The DVD came out through MPI Media Group in May 2010.

== Reception ==
=== Critical response ===
The Cannes reviews set the pattern for most of what followed. Nobody doubted the talent; nearly everyone thought the film too long. Alissa Simon in Variety called it a complex dark comedy "of near-Shakespearean proportions" that would have benefited from substantial trims, and thought its picture of self-righteous Americans as damning as its picture of Romanian corruption. Dan Fainaru in Screen Daily was harsher. He found the film "overlong, bloated and unfocused" and suggested the prize had been given for its intentions rather than its results.

When it reached Britain the following spring, Kieron Corless in Sight & Sound called it an impressively ambitious undertaking for a debut, praised Vasilescu's "magnificently imperious and slippery" stationmaster and Dinulescu's Monica, and wrote that the flaws and longueurs of the final third hardly mattered next to the film's buoyancy and its engagement with every corner of a broad canvas. Time Out found it engaging and slightly sprawling, and thought the shaky handheld camera overused.

The American release in January 2009 brought the warmest notices. A. O. Scott of The New York Times described a "rambunctious, closely observed comedy of cultural collision" whose satire was aimed at Romania's foibles and at the absurdities of geopolitics alike, and called Nemescu a phenomenally talented director; Romanian outlets picked up his verdict that Assante had given the performance of his career. NPR found it witty, poignant and elegantly made. Andrew Schenker of Slant Magazine gave it three stars out of four and compared its view of provincial opportunism to Miloš Forman's The Firemen's Ball, with the difference that Nemescu gives even his most loathsome character a past that explains him. In Cineaste, Monica Filimon admired the almost ethnographic portrait of the village and Nemescu's playful, emotion-driven style, while finding that some episodes, such as a Dracula burlesque staged for the Americans, were there for atmosphere alone and weakened the whole. Keith Uhlich of Time Out New York placed it third in his list of the best films of 2009. On Rotten Tomatoes the film has an approval rating of 89% based on 18 reviews.

French and Belgian critics rated it highly at its release there: La Croix and Elle gave it four stars, Le Monde, Télérama, Paris Match and La Libre Belgique three. In Romania the critic and historian Călin Căliman wrote that, unfinished as it was, this was a mature film with real aesthetic and civic force, enough to establish a new name in Romanian cinema at the first attempt.

=== Box office ===
In Romania the film opened in third place with 3,829 admissions and finished its run with 20,967 admissions and a gross of about 227,000 lei, roughly US$95,000. That made it the second most-seen Romanian release of 2007, behind 4 Months, 3 Weeks and 2 Days. In France it took US$80,476 in its first week. Box Office Mojo records a worldwide gross of $377,275, all of it outside North America.

== Accolades ==
By January 2008 the film had collected 22 awards, according to Mediafax. At the Brussels European Film Festival in July 2007 it took three of the seven prizes on offer, the main jury award among them. At the London Film Festival in November it received the Satyajit Ray Award for a debut feature, given posthumously. At the second Gopo Awards, held on 3 March 2008 at the Royal Palace in Bucharest, it shared the evening with 4 Months, 3 Weeks and 2 Days, which won best film; California Dreamin' won screenplay, actor, editing and costume design, and Tudor Voican received the Young Hope award.

Awards and nominations
Award	Year	Category	Recipient(s)	Result	Ref.
Cannes Film Festival	2007	Un Certain Regard Prize	Cristian Nemescu	Won	
Brussels European Film Festival	2007	Golden Iris (Best Film)	California Dreamin' (endless)	Won	
Brussels European Film Festival	2007	Audience Award	California Dreamin' (endless)	Won	
Brussels European Film Festival	2007	Canvas Television Award	California Dreamin' (endless)	Won	
Anonimul International Independent Film Festival	2007	Anonimul Trophy	California Dreamin' (endless)	Won	
Anonimul International Independent Film Festival	2007	Audience Award	California Dreamin' (endless)	Won	
Ibiza International Film Festival	2007	Golden Falcon	California Dreamin' (endless)	Won	
Rabat International Film Festival	2007	Jury Prize	California Dreamin' (endless)	Won	
Eurasia International Film Festival	2007	Special prize of the head sponsor	California Dreamin' (endless)	Won	
Ellensburg Film Festival	2007	Best Feature	California Dreamin' (endless)	Won	
Milan International Film Festival	2007	Special Mention	California Dreamin' (endless)	Won	
Tofifest (Toruń)	2007	Special Jury Prize for Screenplay	Cristian Nemescu, Tudor Voican	Won	
International Independent Producers' Film Festival (IPIFF)	2007	Critics' Prize	California Dreamin' (endless)	Won	
London Film Festival	2007	Satyajit Ray Award	Cristian Nemescu	Won	
Molodist (Kyiv)	2007	Special Jury Prize	California Dreamin' (endless)	Won	
Molodist (Kyiv)	2007	FIPRESCI Prize	California Dreamin' (endless)	Won	
Auteur Film Festival (Belgrade)	2007	Grand Prix "Aleksandar Saša Petrović"	California Dreamin' (endless)	Won	
Auteur Film Festival (Belgrade)	2007	FIPRESCI Prize	California Dreamin' (endless)	Won	
À l'Est du Nouveau (Rouen)	2007	IUFM jury Coup de cœur	California Dreamin' (endless)	Won	
Bratislava International Film Festival	2007	Student Jury Prize	California Dreamin' (endless)	Won	
Noordelijk Film Festival (Leeuwarden)	2007	Student Jury Prize	California Dreamin' (endless)	Won	
UCIN Awards	2007	Best Director	Cristian Nemescu	Won	
UCIN Awards	2007	Best Screenplay	Cristian Nemescu, Tudor Voican	Won	
UCIN Awards	2007	Best Actor	Răzvan Vasilescu	Won	
UCIN Awards	2007	Special Jury Prize	Armand Assante	Won	
UCIN Awards	2007	Special Mention	Maria Dinulescu, Alexandru Mărgineanu	Won	
Gopo Awards	2008	Best Film	California Dreamin' (endless)	Nominated	
Gopo Awards	2008	Best Director	Cristian Nemescu	Nominated	
Gopo Awards	2008	Best Screenplay	Cristian Nemescu, Tudor Voican	Won	
Gopo Awards	2008	Best Actor	Răzvan Vasilescu	Won	
Gopo Awards	2008	Best Actor	Armand Assante	Nominated	
Gopo Awards	2008	Best Actress	Maria Dinulescu	Nominated	
Gopo Awards	2008	Best Supporting Actor	Ion Sapdaru	Nominated	
Gopo Awards	2008	Best Cinematography	Liviu Marghidan	Nominated	
Gopo Awards	2008	Best Editing	Cătălin Cristuțiu	Won	
Gopo Awards	2008	Best Costume Design	Ana Ioneci	Won	
Gopo Awards	2008	Best Production Design	Ioana Corciova	Nominated	
Gopo Awards	2008	Best Sound	Cristinel Șirli, Cristian Tarnovețchi	Nominated	
Gopo Awards	2008	Young Hope	Tudor Voican	Won	
Gopo Awards	2008	Young Hope	Liviu Marghidan; Alexandru Mărgineanu	Nominated	
RiverRun International Film Festival	2008	Special Jury Prize for Directing	Cristian Nemescu	Won	
RiverRun International Film Festival	2008	Jury Prize for Best Actor	Răzvan Vasilescu	Won	
RiverRun International Film Festival	2008	Best Cinematography	Liviu Marghidan	Won	

== Analysis ==
What academic writing there is on the film treats it mostly as a study of what "America" means in Romania. Ioana Luca, in the Journal of American Studies, reads it as a lens on the overlapping and contradictory ways the United States has been imagined in the country: the wartime hope, summed up in the phrase "the Americans are coming", that they would arrive and undo the Soviet occupation; the enthusiasm for NATO and the "New Europe" of the 2000s; and the disappointments in between. Doiaru's grudge, the mayor's courting of the "investors", the girls' interest in the soldiers and a trip to a ranch near Slobozia built to look like the one in Dallas are all, in her reading, versions of the same idea, translated and mistranslated. Oana Chivoiu calls the film a "cinematic radiography of a national dream". Corless placed Nemescu with the Romanian New Wave for his deadpan humour and his eye for the absurdities of post-Ceaușescu life, but noted that, unlike his contemporaries, he liked to weave fantastical touches into a naturalistic surface. The sparks Monica gives off when she touches a man, and the Elvis impersonator, are both carried over from Marilena de la P7.
