= The Late Mattia Pascal =

1904 novel by Luigi Pirandello

- Cover of the seventh edition (1919)
- Author: Luigi Pirandello
- Original title: Il fu Mattia Pascal
- Language: Italian
- Genre: Humorism
- Publication date: 1904
- Publication place: Italy
- Original text: Il fu Mattia Pascal at Italian Wikisource

The Late Mattia Pascal (Italian: Il fu Mattia Pascal [il ˈfu mmatˈtiːa pasˈkal]) is a 1904 novel by Luigi Pirandello. It is one of his best-known works and was his first major treatment of the theme of the mask.

== Plot summary ==
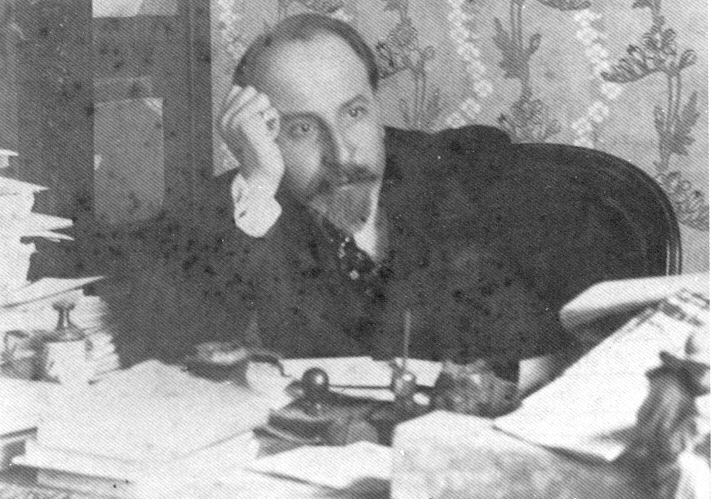
Luigi Pirandello in 1906, two years after the novel's release.

The protagonist, Mattia Pascal, finds that his promising youth has, through misfortune or misdeed, dissolved into a dreary dead-end job and a miserable marriage. His inheritance and the woman he loved are stolen from him by the same man, his eventual wife and mother-in-law badger him constantly, and his twin daughters, neglected by their mother, can provide him with joy only until an untimely death takes them. Death robs him even of his beloved mother.

To escape, he decides one day to sneak off to Monte Carlo, where he encounters an amazing string of luck, acquiring a small fortune. While reading a newspaper on his return home, he discovers, to his immense shock and delight, that his wife and mother-in-law declared an unknown corpse to be his own. Faced with this sudden opportunity to start afresh, he first wanders about Europe, and finally settles down in Rome with an assumed identity. His character develops in unexpected, even admirable, ways. Yet one admirable act brings the protagonist a crisis, followed by additional crises that lead him to conclude that continuing with his plans will entail only misery for those he loves, precisely because his entire life, including the precious liberty he thought he had gained from his past, is now a lie. He ultimately decides to fake his own death and return to his original life. But even that proves difficult; his family and town have long since adjusted to his "death," and his own adjustment of character prompts him to have mercy on his now remarried wife. So the twice-dead Late Mattia Pascal reduces himself to a figure outside the mainstream of society, a walk-on part in his own life.

== Translations into English ==
- Arthur Livingston (Dent/Dutton, 1923)
- William Weaver (1964)

== Adaptations ==
Several film adaptations of the novel have been made:

- Feu Mathias Pascal, a 1925 French silent film directed by Marcel L'Herbier.
- L'Homme de nulle part (The Man from Nowhere), a 1937 French film directed by Pierre Chenal. An Italian-language version, under the title Il fu Mattia Pascal (The Former Mattia Pascal), was simultaneously directed by Chenal.
- Le due vite di Mattia Pascal (The Two Lives of Mattia Pascal), a 1985 Italian film directed by Mario Monicelli.
