= Saint Philip Neri: I Prefer Heaven =

- Written by: Giorgio Mariuzzo; Monica Zapelli; Giacomo Campiotti; Mario Ruggeri
- Directed by: Giacomo Campiotti
- Starring: Gigi Proietti
- Composer: Marco Frisina
- Original language: Italian

Production
- Producer: Luca Bernabei
- Cinematography: Marco Onorato
- Editors: Roberto Missiroli; Alessandro Lucidi
- Running time: 200 min.

Original release
- Network: Rai 1
- Release: 2010

Saint Philip Neri: I Prefer Heaven (Italian: Preferisco il Paradiso) is a 2010 Italian television movie written and directed by Giacomo Campiotti. The film is based on real life events of Roman Catholic priest and then Saint Philip Neri.

== Plot ==
This movie follows the sharp-witted and caring Philip Neri-on a quest for heaven.

== Cast ==
- Gigi Proietti as Philip Neri
- Adriano Braidotti as Alessandro
- Francesco Salvi as Persiano Rosa
- Roberto Citran as Cardinal Capurso
- Sebastiano Lo Monaco as Prince Nerano
- Francesca Chillemi as Ippolita
- Antonio Silvestre as Michele
- Josafat Vagni as Mezzapagnotta
- Francesca Antonelli as Zaira
- Niccolò Senni as Pierotto
- Emiliano Coltorti as Camillo
- Sergio Fiorentini as Pope Sixtus V
- Paolo Paoloni as Pope Gregory XIII
- Francesco Grifoni as Aurelio
