= Anna Valle =

Italian actress

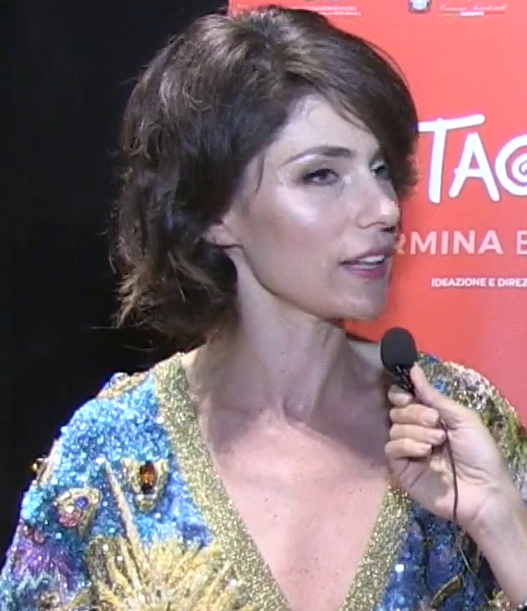
- Valle in 2018
- Born: 19 June 1975 (age 51); Rome, Italy
- Occupations: Actress; fashion model
- Years active: 1995 - present
- Spouse: Ulisse Lendaro (2008)
- Children: Ginevra (2009), Leonardo (2013)
- Website: www.annavalle.com

Anna Valle (born 19 June 1975) is an Italian actress and beauty pageant titleholder.

== Life and career ==
Born in Rome, Anna Valle lived in Ladispoli up to thirteen years; after the separation of her parents she moved to Sicily, in Lentini, the city of origin of the mother. After the high school, she enrolled at the Faculty of Law at the University of Catania, but she interrupted her studies in 1995, when she was elected Miss Italy. The following year she entered the competition at the Miss Universe 1996.

After having appeared in some fotoromanzi and a music video with Gianni Morandi Valle began to attend some acting schools in Rome and Milan, and debuted in the 1996 short film Le due bambole rosse. She later emerged as actress with the success of several television series such as Commesse and Cuore.

== Filmography ==
=== Films ===
Year	Title	Role	Notes
1998	We'll Really Hurt You	Monica	Feature film debut
2001	Sottovento!	Francesca	
2007	SoloMetro	Carla	
2008	Carnera: The Walking Mountain	Pina Kovacic	

=== Television ===
Year	Title	Role	Notes
1995	Miss Italia	Herself	Contestant and winner
1999	Tutti per uno	Mirella	Miniseries
1999–2000	Turbo	Silvia Montini	Main role (season 1); 4 episodes
1999–2002	Commesse	Paola	Main role; 12 episodes
2001	Cuore	Margherita Capuano	Miniseries
2002	Per amore	Paola Mariani	Miniseries
2002	John XXIII: The Pope of Peace	Rosa	Miniseries
2003	Soraya	Soraya	Miniseries
2003	Imperium: Augustus	Cleopatra	Miniseries
2004	Le stagioni del cuore	Claudia Castelli	Main role; 12 episodes
2005	Callas e Onassis	Tina Livanos	Miniseries
2007	Era mio fratello	Maria Palmisano	Miniseries
2008	Fuga per la libertà: L'aviatore	Virginia	Television film
2009	Nebbie e delitti	Chiara Rovasio	Recurring role; 3 episodes
2011	Atelier Fontana - Le sorelle della moda	Zoe Fontana	Miniseries
2011	Un amore e una vendetta	Laura Castellani	Co-lead role; 8 episodes
2012	Barrabas	Claudia Procula	Miniseries
2012–2018	Questo nostro amore	Anna Ferraris	Main role; 36 episodes
2014	Mister Ignis - L'operario che fondò un impero	Maria	Miniseries
2016	Tango per la libertà	Carmen Espinosa	Miniseries
2017	Sorelle	Chiara Silani	Lead role; 6 episodes
2019–2021	La Compagnia del Cigno	Irene Valeri	Main role; 24 episodes
2020	Vite in fuga	Silvia Stellati/Anna Fabbri	Main role; 12 episodes
2021	Luce dei tuoi occhi	Emma Conti	Main role; 6 episodes
2021	Lea - Un nuovo giorno	Lea Castelli	Main role; 8 episodes
