= Luca Ragazzi =

Italian film director, screenwriter, journalist, and actor

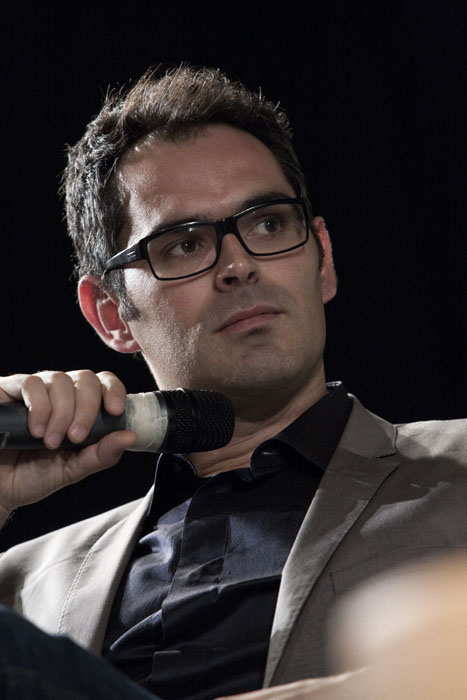
- Luca Ragazzi
- Born: 20 February 1971 (age 55); Rome
- Occupations: Film director, Screenwriter, Journalist and Actor

Luca Ragazzi (born 20 February 1971) is an Italian film director, screenwriter, journalist and actor.

== Biography ==
After studying Letters and Philosophy at Sapienza University in Rome, in 1996 Luca Ragazzi became a journalist and a film critic. In 1999, he entered a relationship with and started collaborating with Gustav Hofer as director and screenwriter.

In 2000, Italian director Claudio Bonivento gave him a small role in the movie Le Giraffe, with Sabrina Ferilli and Veronica Pivetti. In 2008, Ragazzi and Hofer directed the autobiographical documentary Suddenly Last Winter (Improvvisamente l'inverno scorso), dealing with the difficulties of being a gay couple in Italy. The movie was presented at the Berlin International Film Festival in 2008, where it was awarded the jury prize Manfred Salzgeber. In 2009, it won the Nastro d'argento (silver ribbon) as best documentary.

Ragazzi and Hofer directed the 2011 documentary Italy: Love it, or Leave it. The couple's most recent directing collaboration, What Is Left?, was released in 2013.

== Filmography ==
=== Director and screenwriter ===
- Improvvisamente l'inverno scorso, together with Gustav Hofer (2008)
- Italy: Love it, or Leave it, together with Gustav Hofer (2011)

=== Actor ===
- Le giraffe, directed by Claudio Bonivento (2000)
