= Carnera: The Walking Mountain =

2008 Italian film by Renzo Martinelli

- Directed by: Renzo Martinelli
- Written by: Renzo Martinelli; Franco Ferrini
- Produced by: Alfonso Cometti
- Starring: Andrea Iaia; Anna Valle; Paolo Seganti; Burt Young; Paul Sorvino; Bruno Bilotta; Eleonora Martinelli; Nino Benvenuti; Joe Capalbo; Antonio Cupo; Kasia Smutniak; F. Murray Abraham
- Cinematography: Saverio Guarna
- Edited by: Osvaldo Bargero
- Music by: Pivio and Aldo De Scalzi
- Distributed by: Epic Pictures Group
- Release dates: 22 April 2008 (United States); 30 April 2008 (Italy)
- Running time: 125 minutes

Carnera: The Walking Mountain (Italian: Carnera - Il campione più grande) is a 2008 Italian drama film written and directed by Renzo Martinelli.

It depicts real life events of the boxer Primo Carnera.

== Cast ==
- Andrea Iaia as Primo Carnera
- Anna Valle as Pina Kovacic
- Paolo Seganti as Eudeline
- Paul Sorvino as Ledudal
- F. Murray Abraham as Léon Sée
- Kasia Smutniak as Emilia Tersini
- Burt Young as Lou Soresi
- Nino Benvenuti as Trainer M. Baer

== See also ==
- List of Italian films of 2008
