= Roberto Accornero =

Italian television and film actor

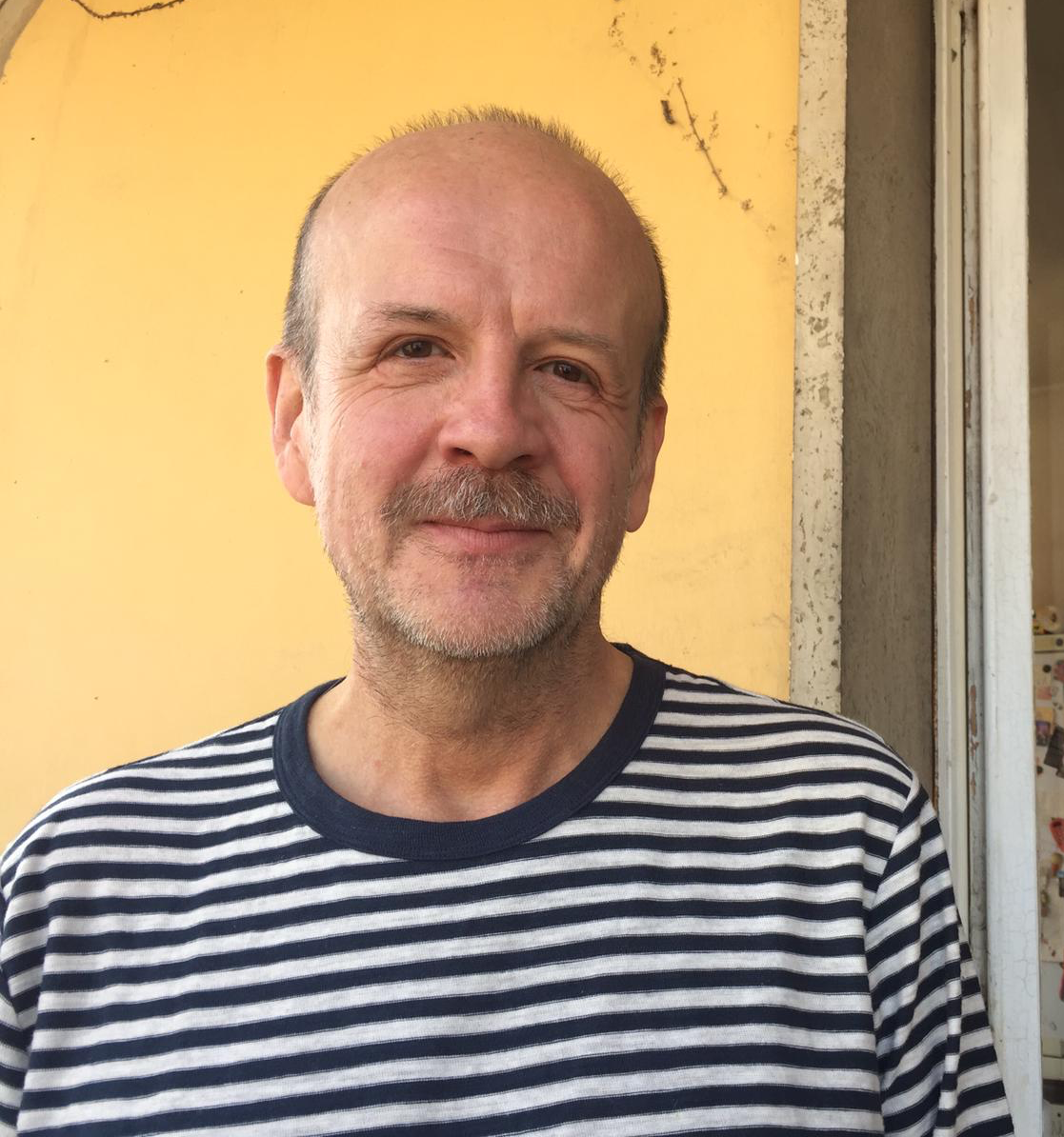
- Roberto Accornero in 2020
- Born: Ivrea, Italy
- Occupations: Actor, voice actor
- Years active: 1981–present
- Height: 1.83 m (6 ft 0 in)

Roberto Accornero is an Italian television, film and voice actor.

He played father Angelo Dell'Acqua in the miniseries John XXIII: The Pope of Peace, and Captain Aloisi in the series Il maresciallo Rocca.

== Early life ==
Accornero entered theater as a youth. He didn't finish university, but accepted a job from his professor, Gian Renzo Morteo.

== Career ==
In 1981 he began an intense activity in radio prose which led him to a lasting partnership with Alberto Gozzi and with the Barlumen Institute. He portrayed Pieretto in Pavia's film Il diavolo sulle colline. He worked with Fellini (Ginger and Fred), Soldini (L'aria serena dell'Ovest), Giannarelli, Calopresti, Ferrario, Argento, Verdone, Faenza, Saura, and Martone.

In the theater he worked for two seasons with Carlo Cecchi, then with Ronconi, Missiroli and many others. On television he appeared in national-popular dramas, as a guard, a thief, in productions directed by Gregoretti, Perelli, Di Carlo, Questi, Capitani, Giordana, Zaccaro, Dayan, Cavani, Frazzi and others.

In 2010 he was recognized at three festivals as best actor for Cribari's Diario di un disagiato. He played Monsignor Angelo Dell'Acqua in the miniseries Pap Giovanni, Captain then Major Aloisi in the series Il Maresciallo Rocca and Guido Geller in the sitcom Camera Café.

== Film ==
Year	Title	Director	Reference
1985	Il diavolo sulle colline	Vittorio Cottafavi	
1985	The Two Lives of Mattia Pascal	Mario Monicelli	
1987	Remake	Ansano Giannarelli	
1990	The Peaceful Air of the West	Silvio Soldini	
1995	Who Killed Pasolini?	Marco Tullio Giordana	
1997	We All Fall Down	Davide Ferrario	
2000	L'educazione di Giulio	Claudio Bondi	
2001	Sleepless	Dario Argento	
2003	It Can't Be All Our Fault	Carlo Verdone	
2003	The Best of Youth	Marco Tullio Giordana	
2004	The Voyage Home	Claudio Bondi	
2005	The Days of Abandonment	Roberto Faenza	
2009	The Double Hour	Giuseppe Capotondi	
2009	I, Don Giovanni	Carlos Saura	
2010	We Believed	Mario Martone	
2014	The Dinner	Ivano De Matteo	

== Dubbing roles ==
=== Animation ===
- Narrator in X-Men: Pryde of the X-Men
- Fox in The Gruffalo
- Fox in The Gruffalo's Child
- Kizashi Haruno in Road to Ninja: Naruto the Movie
- Brain in Top Cat: The Movie
- Brain in Top Cat Begins

=== Live action ===
- Adam Zarrow in Anesthesia
- Nickels in The Devil's Tomb
- Mika in The Captive
- Dr. Christian Keedler in Lucky
- Dr. Reinhard Winkler in 1001 Grams
- Ray Warding in Lying and Stealing
- Denis Goldberg in Escape from Pretoria
- Bill Seidel in The Mauritanian

== Radio ==
- Sam Torpedo (2001) – radio drama – Radio 3
- La fabbrica di polli (2008) – radio drama – Radio 3
