= The Blue Collar Worker and the Hairdresser in a Whirl of Sex and Politics =

- Directed by: Lina Wertmüller
- Written by: Lina Wertmüller; Piero De Bernardi; Leonardo Benvenuti
- Produced by: Bruno Altissimi; Claudio Saraceni
- Starring: Tullio Solenghi; Gene Gnocchi; Veronica Pivetti
- Cinematography: Blasco Giurato
- Edited by: Pierluigi Leonardi
- Music by: Pino D'Angiò
- Release date: 1996
- Running time: 100 min
- Country: Italy
- Language: Italian

The Blue Collar Worker and the Hairdresser in a Whirl of Sex and Politics (Italian: Metalmeccanico e parrucchiera in un turbine di sesso e politica), also known as The Worker and the Hairdresser, is a 1996 Italian comedy film directed by Lina Wertmüller.

== Plot ==
The ideals of Tunin, a Communist metalworker, are challenged when he falls in love with Rossella, a supporter of the right-wing Northern League.

== Cast ==
- Tullio Solenghi: Tunin Gavazzi
- Gene Gnocchi: Zvanin
- Veronica Pivetti: Rossella Giacometti
- Piera Degli Esposti: Palmina Gavazzi
- Cinzia Leone: Mariolina
- Cyrielle Clair: Anitina
- Rossy de Palma
