= La ladra (TV series) =

- Starring: Veronica Pivetti; Daniela Terrieri; Micol Azzurro; Lia Tanzi; Johannes Brandrup; Alessio Chiodini; Ilaria De Laurentis; Sergio Fiorentini; Giancarlo Ratti; Gabriele De Luca; Margherita Vicario; Rocco Tommaso; Fabio Sartor
- Country of origin: Italy
- No. of seasons: 1
- No. of episodes: 12

Original release
- Release: 2010

La ladra is a 2010 Italian television series broadcast on Rai 1.

== Cast ==
- Veronica Pivetti: Eva Marsiglia
- Daniela Terreri: Gina
- Micol Azzurro: Lola
- Lia Tanzi: Andreina
- Alessio Chiodini: Lorenzo Marsiglia
- Johannes Brandrup: Dante Mistretta
- Mohamed Zouaoui: Hafiz
- Fabio Sartor: Max
- Giancarlo Ratti: commissario Caruso
- Gabriele De Luca: Bashir
- Sergio Fiorentini: Augusto
- Camillo Ventola: Ezio

== See also ==
- List of Italian television series
