= The Two Lives of Mattia Pascal =

1985 film by Mario Monicelli

- Film poster
- Directed by: Mario Monicelli
- Written by: Suso Cecchi d'Amico; Ennio De Concini; Mario Monicelli; Luigi Pirandello (novel); Amanzio Todini
- Produced by: Carlo Cucchi; Silvia D'Amico Bendico
- Starring: Marcello Mastroianni
- Cinematography: Camillo Bazzoni
- Edited by: Ruggero Mastroianni
- Music by: Nicola Piovani
- Release date: 1985
- Running time: 125 minutes
- Country: Italy
- Language: Italian

The Two Lives of Mattia Pascal (Italian: Le due vite di Mattia Pascal) is a 1985 Italian drama film directed by Mario Monicelli. It was adapted from the novel Il fu Mattia Pascal by Luigi Pirandello. It was entered into the 1985 Cannes Film Festival.

== Plot ==
Mattia Pascal, an unsuccessful small farmer in northern Italy, decides to try his luck at a French casino and wins. When he sees in a newspaper story that a man with the same name has died mysteriously, he decides that this is a perfect opportunity to begin a new life. He takes the name Arturo Meis and moves to Rome. But he finds that a new life is not necessarily a more satisfying one.

== Cast ==
- Marcello Mastroianni as Mattia Pascal
- Senta Berger as Clara
- Flavio Bucci as Terenzio Papiano
- Laura Morante as Adriana Paleari
- Laura del Sol as Romilda Pescatore
- Caroline Berg as Véronique
- Andréa Ferréol as Silvia Caporale
- Bernard Blier as Anselmo Paleari
- Alessandro Haber as Mino Pomino
- Néstor Garay as Giambattista Malagna
- Rosalia Maggio as Widow Pescatore
- Clelia Rondinella as Oliva Salvoni
- Carlo Bagno as Pellegrinotto
- Flora Cantone as Mattia's mother
- Helen Stirling as Aunt Scolastica
- François Marinovich as Pomino's father
- Elettra Mancini Ferrua as the maid in the Pascal household
- Paul Muller as the chip thief in Monte Carlo
- Victor Cavallo as Lawyer Cirino Settebellezze
- Tonino Proietti as Clara’s lover
- Giuseppe Cederna as the gambling-house operator in Venice
- Peter Berling as Aristide Melainassis
- Roberto Accornero as the suicidal man in Monte Carlo
