= Federal Italy =

Federal Italy Italia Federale
- Leader: Irene Pivetti
- Founded: 22 October 1996
- Dissolved: 29 January 1998
- Split from: Northern League
- Merged into: Italian Renewal
- Ideology: Federalism
- Political position: Centre

Federal Italy (Italia Federale, IF) was a political party in Italy founded in 1996 by Irene Pivetti, after her expulsion from the Northern League on 12 September.

The party was officially constituted in Bolzano and presented its symbol on the following 28 December. The symbol was a rampant bear that, according to its founder, "is a European animal that has always personified the courageous man who obeys reason".

In February 1997 the movement claimed to have collected 2,700 people in three months.

In April and November of the same year, IF made its debut in various local elections, such as the municipal elections in Milan and Catania. In other municipalities IF presented its candidates on the Italian Renewal list, like in Turin, Lecco and Salerno, or on the Christian Democratic Centre list, like in Rome.

In 1998 the IF joined finally the Italian Renewal party.
