= Il maresciallo Rocca =

Italian crime television series

- Genre: Mystery; Comedy-drama
- Created by: Laura Toscano
- Starring: Gigi Proietti; Stefania Sandrelli; Veronica Pivetti; Sergio Fiorentini; Mattia Sbragia; Paolo Gasparini; Francesca Rinaldi; Massimiliano Virgilii; Maurizio Rapotec; Francesco Lodolo; Angelo Sorino; Maurizio Aiello; Roberto Accornero; Daniele Petruccioli; Massimiliano Pazzaglia; Valerio Vinciarelli; Ruben Rigillo; Gabriele Rossi; Luigi Montini; Alberto Molinari; Daniela Scarlatti; Olimpia Di Nardo; Silvia Pasero; Marco Amati; Bettina Giovannini; Pierluigi Telese; Augusto Zucchi; Corrado Tedeschi
- Country of origin: Italy
- Original language: Italian
- No. of seasons: 5
- No. of episodes: 28

Production
- Running time: 90-100 min. (episode)

Original release
- Network: Rai 2 (1996); Rai 1 (1998-2005)
- Release: January 16, 1996 – October 23, 2005

Il maresciallo Rocca (Marshal Rocca) is an Italian mystery comedy-drama television series.

== Cast ==
- Gigi Proietti as Marshal Giovanni Rocca
- Stefania Sandrelli as Margherita Rizzo
- Veronica Pivetti as Francesca Mariani
- Sergio Fiorentini as Brigadier Alfio Cacciapuoti
- Mattia Sbragia as Prosecutor Gennaro Mannino
- Paolo Gasparini as Michele Banti
- Francesca Rinaldi as Daniela Rocca
- Massimiliano Virgilii as Carmelo Russo
- Maurizio Aiello as Marco Sallustri
- Silvia Pasero as Antonella Massimini
- Luigi Montini as Morissi
- Ennio Girolami as Cesare Massimini
- Olimpia Di Nardo as Miss Massimini
- Roberto Accornero as Capitain Aloisi

== See also ==
- List of Italian television series
