= Octavian Nemescu =

Romanian composer (1940–2020)

Octavian Nemescu (29 March 1940 – 6 November 2020) was a Romanian composer of orchestral, chamber, choral, electroacoustic, multimedia, metamusic, imaginary and ritual works.

Born in Pașcani, Nemescu studied from 1956 to 1963 at the National University of Music in Bucharest, where he took composition with Mihail Jora, harmony with Paul Constantinescu and orchestration with Alexandru Pașcanu and Anatol Vieru. In 1972 he participated in the Darmstadt summer courses. From 1971 to 1978 he taught music analysis and counterpoint at the Transilvania University of Brașov. Until 1990 he was professor of counterpoint, harmony and music history at the George Enescu National University of Arts in Iași. Since then he was a professor of composition at the National University of Music in Bucharest.

Nemescu died in Bucharest at age 80. He was the father of the Romanian film director Cristian Nemescu (1979–2006).

== Legacy ==
Nemescu is considered one of the most important and "one of the most original Romanian composers". In the 1950s and 1960s, under the Romanian dictatorship, he is known to have been part of the resistance group and one of the first "ecologists" amongst Romanian composers.

== Awards ==
For his compositions he received the Aaron Copland Prize, several times the prize of the Romanian Composers Union, two prizes at the Concours International de Musique Électroacoustique de Bourges (1980 and 1982), the prize of the Romanian Academy of Arts and Sciences (1981) and the prize of the International Confederation for Electroacoustic Music (ICEM, 1985).

== Works ==
- Sonata for Clarinet and Piano, 1962
- Triangle, 1963–1964
- Combinations in Circles for cello ensemble and tape, 1965
- Four Dimensions in Time - IV, 'Illuminations' for mixed choir and orchestra, 1967
- Four Dimensions in Time - V, '1918', 1968
- Suggestions multimedia performance, 1968
- Memorial multimedia performance, 1968
- The King Will The multimedia performance, 1968
- Grafological music, multimedia performance, 1969
- Concentric for ensemble and tape, 1969
- Four Dimensions in Time - VII # ', 1970
- Semantics for n melomen, 1971–1974
- Ulysses, multimedia performance in 1972
- Naturel - Culturel for tape, 1973
- Spectacle, pour un instant for piano, ensemble and tape, 1974
- Cromoson - Song of Objects, 1974–1975
- Will You Be Able by Yourself ?, 1976
- Salve Regina for mixed choir and organ, 1981
- Gradeatia for tape; 1982
- Metabizantinirikon, for clarinet, violin and tape, 1985
- Centrifuga for piano and tape, 1986
- Trisson for tape, 1986
- Sonatu (h) r for tape, 1987
- Alpha - Omega for saxophone (s), violin, percussion and tape, 1988
- IN PAR for trombone and tape, 1988
- Lumina lina for mixed choir, 1988
- NonSymphony No. 5, 1988–1992
- Alpha - Omega recidiva, 1989
- Finalis-septima for clarinet, bassoon, violin, cello, piano and percussion, 1989
- Finalpha for trombone, percussion and tape, 1990
- Finaleph, 1990
- String Quartet for Midnight, 1993
- Quindecimortuorum for 1 o'clock AM for two percussionists and Wind Orchestra, 1994
- DanielPentAbsorbOR for saxophone (s) and tape, 1995
- Negantidiadua for 2 o'clock AM for voice, alto saxophone, trombone, piano, percussion and tape, 1995
- Comme je dis for voice and piano, 1996
- PhosisTripercMetaMor for 3 o'clock AM for English horn, percussion and tape, 1996
- PreSymphony No. 6, 1996-2000
- Septuor for 4 o'clock AM for oboe, clarinet, bassoon, violin, cello, piano, percussion and tape, 1997
- Quintabeit for 5 o'clock AM for voice, oboe, clarinet, bassoon, two trumpets, violin, cello, piano, percussion and tape, 1998
- Beitsonorum for 6 o'clock AM for oboe, clarinet, bassoon, violin, cello, piano, percussion and tape, 1999
- Beitintervallum for 7 o'clock AM for clarinet, violin, piano, percussion and tape, 2000
- Saecula - Saeculorum for tape, 2000
- Beitrissonum for 8 o'clock AM for two flutes, violin, viola, accordion and tape, 2001
- PostSymphony No. 2, 2001
- PluriSymphony No. 1 for mixed choir and orchestra, 2002
- RouaUruauor for 9 o'clock AM for flute, tuba, piano, percussion and tape, 2002
- OUA for 10 o'clock AM for flute, clarinet, trombone, violin, piano, percussion and tape, 2002–2003
- PostSymphony No. 3, 2003
