= Irene Pivetti =

Italian politician (born 1963)

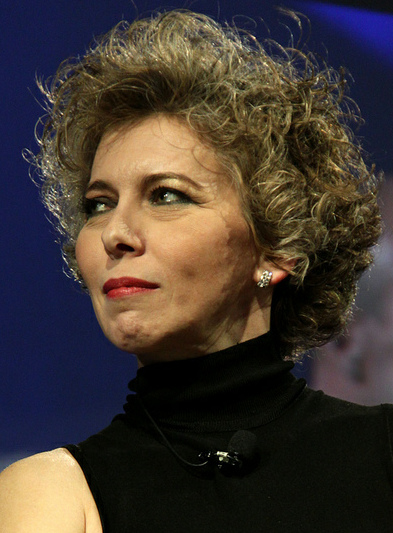
- Pivetti in 2010

President of the Chamber of Deputies
- In office 16 April 1994 – 8 May 1996
- Preceded by: Giorgio Napolitano
- Succeeded by: Luciano Violante

Member of the Chamber of Deputies
- In office 23 April 1992 – 29 May 2001
- Constituency: Milan (1992–1996); Varese (1996–2001)

Personal details
- Born: 4 April 1963 (age 63) Milan, Italy
- Party: FI (since 2019)
- Other political affiliations: LN (1989–1996); IF (1996–1998); RI (1998–1999); UDEUR (1999–2002); Independent (2002–2013); FDCP (2013–2016); LN (2016–2018)
- Children: 2
- Relatives: Veronica Pivetti (sister)
- Education: Università Cattolica del Sacro Cuore
- Profession: Journalist, politician

Irene Pivetti (born 4 April 1963) is an Italian journalist, television presenter, and politician. From 1994 to 1996, she was president of the Chamber of Deputies. After leaving politics, she started a career in television, like her sister Veronica, a popular Italian actress.

== Biography ==
Pivettiis the daughter of director Paolo Pivetti and actress Grazia Gabrielli, sister of the actress, presenter, and director Veronica Pivetti, and granddaughter of the linguist Aldo Gabrielli (maternal grandfather). She graduated with honors in literature (philosophical address) at the Catholic University of the Sacred Heart of Milan; after the degree, she worked as an editorial consultant. Between 1987 and 1990, she edited volumes on the Italian language for Motta Editore, Selezione, Mondadori, Club degli Editori, and De Agostini. She was married two times: first with Paolo Taranta (marriage annulled by the Roman Rota on her appeal) and then with Alberto Brambilla, from which she had two children and from whom she subsequently divorced.

From 1990 to 1994, Pivetti was in charge of the Catholic Council of the Lombard League, which later became Northern League. In 1992, she was elected a member of the Chamber of Deputies, and she was re-elected in 1994. On 15 April 1994, at the fourth ballot, she was elected president of the Chamber of Deputies; at 31, she was the youngest president of the Chamber of Italian history. In the 1996 election, she was re-elected. On 12 September 1996, she was expelled from the Northern League for her opposition to the line of the Padanian secessionism. On 22 October 1996, she founded Federal Italy, which merged into the Italian Renewal in 1998. In 1999, Pivetti joined the UDEUR, of which she was president from 23 May 1999 until 2002.

In 2009, Pivetti was appointed councilor for work and vocational training in the municipality of Berceto, in the province of Parma. In August 2010, she was appointed image commissioner in the municipality of Reggio Calabria. In the 2013 Lazio regional election, she ran among the ranks of the Federation of Christian Populars, without being elected. In 2016, she was a candidate in the municipal elections of Rome among the ranks of Us with Salvini, also in this case without being elected. In the 2019 European election, she was a candidate to the European Parliament on the Forza Italia list.

In April 2020, the Prosecutor Offices of Rome, Savona, Siracusa, and Imperia started an investigation on her due to trafficking of non-compliant masks from China. In June 2020, the Prosecutor Office of Milan started another investigation on her due to money-laundering. These investigations are related to her activities during the COVID-19 pandemic. In November 2021, the Economic and Financial Police Unit of the Guardia di Finanza of Milan carried out a preventive seizure of €4 million against her and one of her consultants, among the suspects in an investigation that focuses on a series of commercial transactions, in particular the purchase and sale of three Ferrari, which would have been used to clean up the proceeds of tax evasion. The sum was then released.

In September 2024, Pivetti was sentenced to 4 years jail due to tax evasion and €3.4 millions were confiscated.

== Electoral history ==
Election	House	Constituency	Party	Votes	Result
1992	Chamber of Deputies	Milan–Pavia	LL	3,272	Elected
1994	Chamber of Deputies	Milan 10	LN	46,005	Elected
1996	Chamber of Deputies	Varese	LN	29,213	Elected

=== First-past-the-post elections ===
1994 general election (C): Milan 10
Candidate	Coalition	Votes	%
Irene Pivetti	Pole of Freedoms	46,005	52.1
Mario Fernando Sassi	Alliance of Progressives	26,600	30.1
Alberto Antonio Maria Fossati	Pact for Italy	8,365	9.5
Sergio Luppi	National Alliance	7,271	8.2
Total		88,241	100.0

1996 general election (C): Varese
Candidate	Coalition	Votes	%
Irene Pivetti	Lega Nord	29,213	34.6
Luigi Zocchi	Pole for Freedoms	28,687	34.0
Robertino Ghiringhelli	The Olive Tree	24,548	29.1
Roberto Minidio	Tricolour Flame	2,034	2.3
Total		84,482	100.0

Political offices
Preceded by Giorgio Napolitano	President of the Italian Chamber of Deputies; 1994–1996	Succeeded by Luciano Violante
