= Pope John Paul I: The Smile of God =

2006 Italian miniseries directed by Giorgio Capitani

- Written by: Francesco Scardamaglia; Massimo Cerofolini
- Directed by: Giorgio Capitani
- Starring: Neri Marcorè
- Composer: Marco Frisina
- Country of origin: Italy
- Original language: Italian

Production
- Cinematography: Claudio Sabatini
- Editor: Antonio Siciliano
- Running time: 180 min.

Original release
- Network: Rai 1
- Release: 2006

Pope John Paul I: The Smile of God (Italian: Papa Luciani - Il sorriso di Dio) is a 2006 Italian television movie written and directed by Giorgio Capitani. The film is based on real life events of Roman Catholic Pope John Paul I.

== Plot ==
Contrary to his father's socialist views, Albino Luciani (the Pope's birth name) entered the lower seminary in Feltre. After being ordained a priest in 1935, he became a vicar in his home parish. Then, while teaching theology at the seminary, he wrote a doctoral dissertation. In 1958 he became a bishop of Vittorio Veneto, in 1973 a cardinal, and a pope in 1978.

== Cast ==
- Neri Marcorè as Albino Luciani
- José María Blanco as Card. Jean-Marie Villot
- Paolo Romano as Don Diego Lorenzi
- Franco Interlenghi as Agostino Casaroli
- Imma Colomer Marcet as Sister Lucia dos Santos
- Gabriele Ferzetti as Cardinal Giuseppe Siri
- Roberto Citran as Luigi Tiezzi
- Jacques Sernas as Paul Marcinkus
- Sergio Fiorentini as Father Gruber
- Alberto Di Stasio as Gioacchino Muccin
- Giorgia Bongianni as Bortola Luciani
- Giuseppe Antignati as Cardinal Karol Wojtyła
- Emilio De Marchi as Girolamo Bortignon
