= Sergio Fiorentini =

Italian actor (1934–2014)

- Born: 29 July 1934; Rome, Italy
- Died: 11 December 2014 (aged 80); Rome, Italy
- Occupations: Actor; voice actor; dubbing director
- Years active: 1960–2014
- Height: 1.65 m (5 ft 5 in)
- Spouse: Eliana Lupo
- Children: Maurizio Fiorentini

Sergio Fiorentini (29 July 1934 – 11 December 2014) was an Italian actor and voice actor.

Fiorentini was best known for his portrayal of characters in Italian crime dramas and films as well as dubbing Gene Hackman in a majority of his films and Rafiki in the Italian version of The Lion King film series.

== Biography ==
Sergio Fiorentini was born in Rome on 29 July 1934. He started his career on stage in the 1960s, and since the early 1970s he began an intense career as a character actor, being often cast in roles of inspectors, police commissioners and men in uniform in poliziotteschi and in crime films and TV-series, such as A Special Cop in Action and Distretto di Polizia. He most notably portrayed Alfio Cacciapuoti in Il maresciallo Rocca opposite Gigi Proietti.

Fiorentini was also very active as a voice actor and a dubber. He was the official Italian voice actor of Gene Hackman. This was a role he shared with his colleague Renato Mori. Other actors he dubbed included Eli Wallach and Jack Warden as well as Bill Cosby, Burt Young, Tony Burton, Max von Sydow, Tom Wilkinson, Charles Durning, Patrick McGoohan, Bud Spencer, James Doohan, Mel Brooks and he also voiced Benny Hill in the Italian dubbed version of The Benny Hill Show. In Fiorentini's animated voice roles, he dubbed Rafiki in The Lion King franchise. Other roles include Bumblelion in The Wuzzles, Alm-Onji in Heidi, Girl of the Alps, Trigger in Robin Hood, Br'er Bear, Pete in Trombone Trouble and Walt Disney speaking about fire and water.

== Personal life ==
Fiorentini was the father of voice actor Maurizio Fiorentini (born 1963) and he was married to actress Eliana Lupo (who was 27 years younger than him) until his death in 2014.

== Death ==
Fiorentini died in Rome after battling an illness on the evening of 11 December 2014, at the age of 80.

== Filmography ==
=== Cinema ===
- Hospitals: The White Mafia (1973)
- Bello come un arcangelo (1974) – Don Fernando, priest
- Rome: The Other Side of Violence (1976) – Marcello
- A Special Cop in Action (1976) – Mancuso
- I Am the Law (1977) – Un mafioso
- The Invisible Wall (1991) – Capo Stato Maggiore Aereonautica
- Ostinato destino (1992)
- Angel with a Gun (1992)
- Complicazioni nella notte (1992)
- A Cold, Cold Winter (1996)
- La Vera Madre (1999)
- Stregati dalla luna (2001) – Maresciallo
- Nel mio amore (2004) – Giovanni
- Taxi Lovers (2005) – Alberto
- Torno a vivere da solo (2008) – Peppino
- Me, Them and Lara (2009) – Albero Mascolo – padre di Carlo
- All at Sea (2011) – Nonno
- Teresa Manganiello. Sui passi dell'amore (2012) – Alberto Gregorini
- Viva l'Italia (2012) – Cesare
- A Perfect Family (2012) – Uomo cimitero
- The Move of The Penguin (2013) – padre Salvatore
- Il mio giorno (2015) – Matteo (posthumous release)

=== Television ===
- Il maresciallo Rocca (1996–2005) – Brig. Alfio Cacciapuoti
- Saint Philip Neri: I Prefer Heaven (2010)
- La ladra (2010)
- Crimini (2010)
- Paul VI: The Pope in the Tempest (2008)
- Ho sposato uno sbirro (2008)
- Nebbie e delitti (2007)
- Imperium: Pompeii (2007)
- Pope John Paul I: The Smile of God (2006)
- La buona battaglia – Don Pietro Pappagallo (2006)
- La squadra (2004–2006)

== Dubbing roles ==
=== Animation ===
- Rafiki in The Lion King, The Lion King II: Simba's Pride, The Lion King 1½, Timon & Pumbaa
- Trigger in Robin Hood
- Bumblelion in The Wuzzles
- Narrator in Treasure Planet
- General Mandible in Antz
- Yar in Dinosaur
- Alm-Onji in Heidi, Girl of the Alps
- Shazzan in Shazzan
- Julius Caesar in Asterix Conquers America
- General Woundwort in Watership Down
- Jarol in Fire and Ice
- Br'er Bear in Song of the South (1973 redub)
- Kotaro Azuma in Casshan
- Count Lazare d'Cagliostro in The Castle of Cagliostro

=== Live action ===
- Lex Luthor in Superman, Superman II
- Lex Luthor / Voice of Nuclear Man in Superman IV: The Quest for Peace
- Wilfred Buckley in Power
- Robert Caulfield in Narrow Margin
- Colonel Jason Rhodes in Uncommon Valor
- Walter Lloyd / Duncan (Duke) Potter in Target
- Jedediah Tucker Ward in Class Action
- Harry Zimm in Get Shorty
- Kevin Keeley in The Birdcage
- Jack Ames in Twilight
- Edward "Brill" Lyle in Enemy of the State
- Arnold Margolese in The Mexican
- Jimmy McGinty in The Replacements
- Joe Moore in Heist
- Leslie McMahon Reigart in Behind Enemy Lines
- William B. Tensy in Heartbreakers
- Royal Tenenbaum in The Royal Tenenbaums
- Rankin Fitch in Runaway Jury
- Sam Cayhall in The Chamber
- Monroe "Eagle" Cole in Welcome to Mooseport
- Gene Hackman in I Knew It Was You
- Ritchie Blumenthal in The Hunter
- General Reser in The Domino Principle
- Cesare in Eye of the Cat
- Herbert Morrison in Nuts
- Noah Dietrich in The Hoax
- Old Man in The Ghost Writer
- Leon B. Little in Tough Guys
- Harry M. Rosenfeld in All the President's Men
- Jackie in The Champ
- Nerva in A.D.
- Max Corkle in Heaven Can Wait
- Julian Marx in Bullets over Broadway
- Judge Francis Reyford in ...And Justice for All
- Les Nichols in Tootsie
- William Snyder in The Sting
- Charlie in Two of a Kind
- Paulie Pennino in Rocky Balboa
- Mueller in The Hideout
- Lou Kritski in The Super
- Cosmo Castorini in Moonstruck
- Frank Hull in Firepower
- Benny Hill in The Benny Hill Show
- Yogurt / President Skroob in Spaceballs
- William J. Le Petomane / Indian Chief in Blazing Saddles
- Charleston in Charleston
- Moses in Troublemakers
- Pepe in Killing Is My Business, Honey
- Curly in The Money Pit
- Paul Gray in Suspect
- Randolph Duke in Trading Places
- Montgomery Scott in Star Trek: The Motion Picture
- Montgomery Scott in Star Trek IV: The Voyage Home
- Lawrence Woodruff in Jack
- Bill Cosby in Fat Albert
- Kruge in Star Trek III: The Search for Spock
- Terry Jones’s roles in Monty Python's The Meaning of Life
- Harold Dobey in Starsky & Hutch
- Curtis in The Blues Brothers
- Benjamin Khaled in The Stud
- General Gogol in For Your Eyes Only
- Mr. MacMillan in Big
- Ammon in Clash of the Titans
- Mickey Goldmill in Rocky III
- Dr. Constantine in Murder on the Orient Express
- Odell Gardener in Evil Under the Sun
- Robert Beaumont in The Ghost and the Darkness
- Stanislaus Katzinsky in All Quiet on the Western Front
- Rolling Star in Blueberry
- Toht in Indiana Jones and the Raiders of the Lost Ark
- Leon Kowalski in Blade Runner
- King Edward Longshanks in Braveheart
- Shaman in Indiana Jones and the Temple of Doom
- Rogers in Brubaker
- Ben Luckett in Cocoon
- Sam Stone in Ruthless People
- Hollis Peaker in Capricorn One
- Jeffrey "The Big" Lebowski in The Big Lebowski
- Michael Hughes in Meteor
- Jack Cartwright in The Sea Wolves
- Judge Atkins in Kramer vs. Kramer
- Carroll "Toddy" Todd in Victor/Victoria
- Irving Finegarten in S.O.B.
- Mr. Choudhury in Death on the Nile
- Baron Vladimir Harkonnen in Dune
- Barney in The Pope of Greenwich Village
- President of the United States in Armageddon
- President of the United States in The Rock
- John Bigalow in Raise the Titanic
- Dr. Ross in Splash
