= Gustav Hofer =

Italian film director (born 1976)

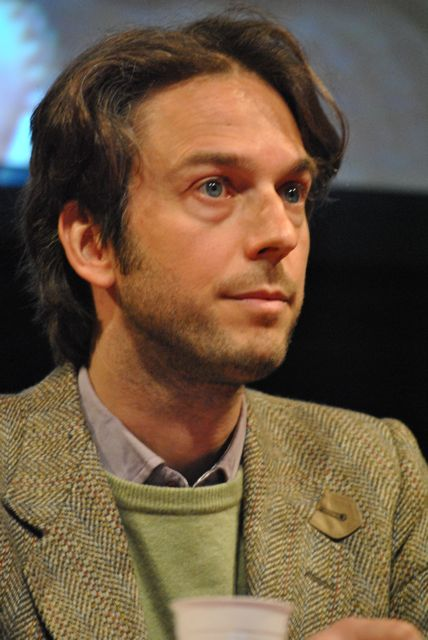
- Gustav Hofer
- Born: 9 May 1976 (age 49); Sarntal
- Occupations: Film director, screenwriter, journalist and TV host

Gustav Hofer (Sarntal, 9 May 1976) is an Italian film director, screenwriter, journalist and TV host.

== Biography ==
Gustav Hofer graduated in "Communication sciences" in Vienna and then in "Cinema" in London. Later he moved to Rome where in 1999, he built a relationship with Luca Ragazzi. In 2001, Gustav started working for the TV channel Arte where in 2005 he started to host the show "Journal de la Culture – Arte Kultur".

He started his work as film director in 2004, directing the TV documentary "Il Sangue dell'Impero" (Blood of the Empire) together with Pietro Suber. Four years later, in 2008, Gustav Hofer and Luca Ragazzi directed the autobiographical documentary "Improvvisamente L'Inverno Scorso" (Suddenly, Last Winter), dealing with the difficulties of being a gay couple in Italy. The movie was presented at the Berlin International Film Festival in 2008, where it won the jury prize Manfred Salzgeber. In 2009 it also won the Nastro d'argento (silver ribbon) for best documentary.

Together with Luca Ragazzi, in 2011, he also directed the documentary "Italy: Love it, or Leave it", a road-movie style examination of Berlusconi's Italy. It won the Audience Award and Best Feature Film at the Milan Film Festival in 2011.

== Filmography ==
=== Director and screenwriter ===
- Il sangue dell'impero, together with Pietro Suber (2004) – Film TV
- Improvvisamente l'inverno scorso, together with Luca Ragazzi (2008)
- Italy: Love it, or Leave it, together with Luca Ragazzi (2011)
