= Commesse =

Italian television series

- Genre: Comedy-drama
- Starring: Sabrina Ferilli; Nancy Brilli; Veronica Pivetti; Anna Valle
- Country of origin: Italy
- No. of seasons: 2
- No. of episodes: 12

Original release
- Release: April 12, 1999 – April 14, 2002

Commesse is an Italian television comedy-drama series directed by Giorgio Capitani and broadcast by Rai 1 between 1999 and 2002.

== Cast ==
- Sabrina Ferilli: Marta De Santis
- Nancy Brilli: Roberta Ardenzi
- Veronica Pivetti: Fiorenza
- Franco Castellano: Romeo
- Caterina Vertova: Francesca Carraro
- Anna Valle: Paola
- Elodie Treccani: Lucia Manca
- Lorenzo Ciompi: Dottor Livata
- Giacomo Piperno: Dante, padre di Fiorenza
- Giuliana Calandra: Anna, madre di Fiorenza
- Rodolfo Bigotti: Giancarlo De Santis, marito di Marta
- Massimo Ciavarro: Architetto Riccardo Jesi
- Gigliola Cinquetti: Clara Massimi
- Ray Lovelock: Luca Massimi
- Caterina Deregibus: Elisa (season 2)
- Marco Bonini: Tommaso (season 2)
- Massimo Ghini: Avvocato Giovanni Minardi (season 2)
- Cesare Bocci: Gianni, fidanzato di Fiorenza (season 2)

== See also ==
- List of Italian television series
