= Vincenzo Bocciarelli =

Italian actor, painter and film producer (born 1972)

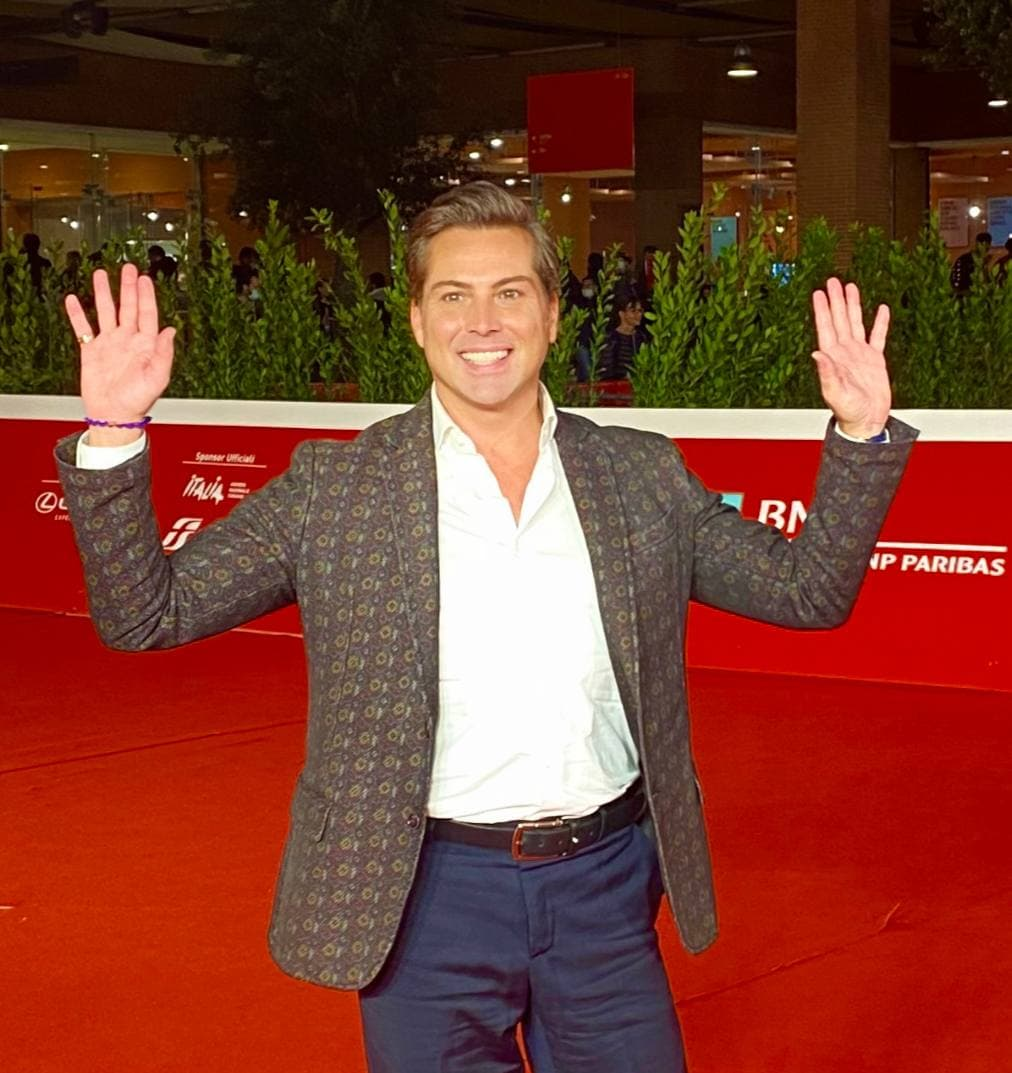
- Bocciarelli in 2021
- Born: February 22, 1972 (age 53); Bozzolo, Mantua, Italy
- Occupations: Actor; painter; film producer

Vincenzo Bocciarelli (born February 22, 1972) is an Italian actor, painter, and film producer. He is currently artistic director of the theatres of Siena.

== Early life ==
He was born in Bozzolo in a small town in the province of Mantua. A few months after his birth, his family moved to Siena, where his academic and artistic training took place, attending the Duccio di Buoninsegna Art Institute and at the same time the Piccolo Teatro di Siena where, at only fifteen, he made his debut; first in Gl'innamorati by Carlo Goldoni in the role of Fulgenzio and then in Phaedra by Seneca the Younger in the role of Ippolito, and then in Vigilanza Stretta by Jean Genet.

== Career ==
After graduating in 1993 and receiving the Hystrio de Vocation Prize at Montegrotto Terme by Vittorio Gassman, on behalf of the Histryo theatre magazine, he was noticed by Glauco Mauri who chose him as his co-star in the role of Karl Van Beethoven in the show Quaderni di conversazione by Ludwig van Beethoven and for the comedy Tutto per bene by Luigi Pirandello. He continued with the Mauri company, where he played the messenger in Oedipus Rex by Sophocles. He also played Ariel in The Tempest and Edgar in King Lear, both written by William Shakespeare.

== Filmography ==
=== Film ===
- Le grandi dame di casa d'Este (2004)
- E ridendo l'uccise (2005)
- The Inquiry (2006)
- Cartoline da Roma (2008)
- Alba (2009)
- Nirakazhcha (2010)
- La strada dei colori (2012)
- La scuola più bella del mondo (2014)
- Mission Possible (2018)
- Red Land (Rosso Istria) (2018)
- Professor Dinkan
- The dog christmas
- Lockdownlove.It (2021)
