= Veronica Pivetti =

Italian actress and voice actress

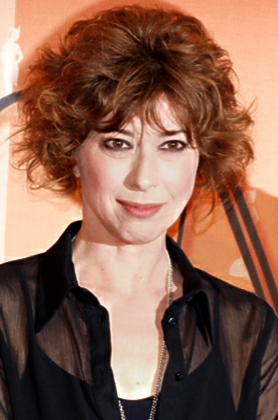
- Born: 19 February 1965 (age 61); Milan, Italy
- Occupation: Actress

Veronica Pivetti (born 19 February 1965) is an Italian actress and voice actress.

== Life and career ==
Born in Milan, Pivetti is the daughter of Grazia Gabrielli, a voice actress and of Paolo Pivetti, a stage director. She is the younger sister of the politician Irene Pivetti. She started her career as a voice actress at 8 years old, specializing in dubbing anime and cartoons. Pivetti studied painting at Accademia di Brera in Milan and briefly worked as studio assistant for an artist before focusing on acting again. After several appearances in the variety show Quelli che... il Calcio, in 1995 Pivetti made her film debut, chosen by the actor and director Carlo Verdone to play his wife in the box office hit Viaggi di nozze. After appearing in several more films, notably Lina Wertmüller's The Blue Collar Worker and the Hairdresser in a Whirl of Sex and Politics, Pivetti later focused her activities on television, playing main roles in a number of successful TV-series, including Commesse, Il maresciallo Rocca and Provaci ancora prof. In 1998 Pivetti hosted the Sanremo Music Festival alongside Raimondo Vianello and Eva Herzigová.

== Filmography ==
=== Film ===
Year	Title	Role	Notes
1978	Farewell to Space Battleship Yamato	Yuki Mori	Italian voice-over
1995	Viaggi di nozze	Fosca	
1996	The Blue Collar Worker and the Hairdresser in a Whirl of Sex and Politics	Rossella Giacometti	
1997	Other Men	Maria De Simone	
1997	Hercules	Megara	Italian voice-over
1998	Kirikou and the Sorceress	Karabà	Italian voice-over
2000	Le giraffe	Michela	
2008	Horton Hears a Who!	Sour Kangaroo	Italian voice-over
2015	Né Giulietta né Romeo	Olga Bordin	
2016	La cena di Natale	Pina	

=== Television ===
Year	Title	Role	Notes
1990	Don Tonino	Journalist	Episode: "Don Tonino e la maledizione dell'abate"
1993	Quelli che... il Calcio	Herself / Opinionist	Talk show
1998	Sanremo Music Festival 1998	Herself / Co-host	Annual music festival
1999–2002	Commesse	Fiorenza Damiani	Main role
2000	Les ritaliens	Vittoria Rinaldi	Television film
2000	Qualcuno da amare	Dr. Claudia Sereni	Television film
2001	L'attentatuni - Il grande attentato	Anna Granata	Television film
2003–2005	Il maresciallo Rocca	Francesca Mariani	Main role (seasons 4–5)
2005	L'amore non basta	Carola	Television film
2005–2017	Provaci ancora prof!	Camilla Baudino	Lead role
2006	David di Donatello	Herself / Host	Award ceremony
2007	Zecchino d'Oro	Herself / Co-host	Singing competition
2009	Miacarabefana.it	Beniamina Volò / Babuccia Bucata	Television film
2010	La ladra	Eva Marsiglia	Lead role
2011	S.O.S. Befana	Beniamina Volò / Babuccia Bucata	Television film
2018–2021	Amore criminale	Herself / Host	Investigation docuseries
2019–present	Nuovi eroi	Narrator (voice)	Docuseries
2025	Balene – Amiche per sempre	Evelina Maggi	Lead role
