= Cristian Nemescu =

Romanian film director

- Born: 31 March 1979; Bucharest, Socialist Republic of Romania
- Died: 24 August 2006 (aged 27); Bucharest, Romania
- Education: Caragiale Academy of Theatrical Arts and Cinematography
- Occupation: Film director
- Father: Octavian Nemescu

Cristian Nemescu (Romanian pronunciation: [kristiˈan neˈmesku]; 31 March 1979 – 24 August 2006) was a Romanian film director.

Nemescu was born in Bucharest, the son of composer Octavian Nemescu. He graduated from the Academy for Theater and Film in 2003. During his final year in the academy he made a short film, Story From The Third Block Entrance, that received awards at the New York University International Student Film Festival and the Premiers Plans in Angers, France. The European Academy Awards nominated it as "best short film" that year.

Nemescu's Marilena from P7, which he wrote and directed, were screened at International Critics' Week of the Cannes Film Festival in 2006.

Nemescu's last film was California Dreamin' (Endless), starring Armand Assante. He finished filming in July and was in post-production at the time of his death. The movie was awarded the Un Certain Regard prize at the 2007 Cannes Film Festival.

He was killed in a car crash in Bucharest that also killed Romanian-born sound engineer Andrei Toncu. Nemescu and Toncu were riding in a taxi that was struck on Eroilor Bridge by a Porsche Cayenne SUV driven by a British citizen (Ali Imran) who ran a red light. Technical expertise established that the Porsche was going 113 km/h (70 mph), 63 km/h (39 mph) above the speed limit, while the taxi had a speed of 42 km/h (26 mph). The driver was initially sentenced to 7 years in prison by a Romanian court, but this was later reduced to 6 years.

== Legacy ==
In 2007, in the memory of film director Cristian Nemescu and sound designer Andei Toncu, a film festival was created, NexT, event for short and medium films. The festival was the largest event of its kind in Romania and it was discontinued in 2023, after 12 editions.

== Filmography as director ==
- 2007 California Dreamin' (unfinished)
- 2006 Marilena de la P7 (Marilena from P7)
- 2003 Poveste la scara C (C Block Story)
- 2001 Mihai și Cristina (Mihai and Cristina)
- 2001 Mecano
- 2000 La bloc oamenii mor după muzică (In Apartment Buildings People Are Crazy About Music)
- 2000 Kitchitoarele
