= Andrei Toncu =

Romanian sound designer

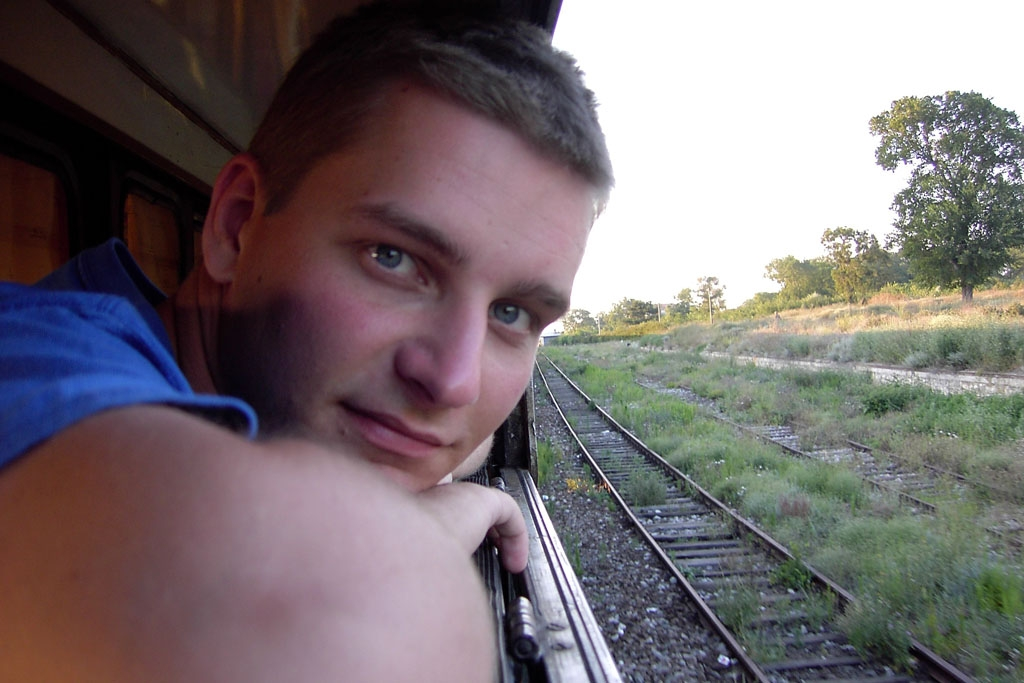
- Born: April 8, 1978; Bucharest, Romania
- Died: August 25, 2006 (aged 28); Bucharest
- Occupation: Sound designer

Andrei "Otto" Toncu (April 8, 1978 – August 25, 2006) was a Romanian sound designer.

== Biography ==
Andrei Toncu was born in Bucharest. He graduated from Bucharest University for Theater and Film (Film and TV Department, Multimedia, Sound and Editing) in 2000. His final project short film, Free Fall, directed by Dorin Stana, received the best sound award at the International Student Film Festival CineMAiubit in Bucharest (2000).

After graduation, Toncu worked with film and TV sound for Antena1 and B1TV Romanian TV channels. He also worked as an independent filmmaker.

In 2004, Toncu went to Chicago to work on the thriller To Kill a Killer, which was directed by Ricardo Islas. Toncu was responsible for all aspects of sound on the English and Spanish versions of the movie. It was released on DVD by Warner Bros in June 2007.

The sound of many documentaries, cartoons as well as medium and short length films also bear Andrei Toncu's signature. Among them is The Tube With A Hat by Radu Jude, which has received 17 international awards.

The movies Mihai and Cristina, C Block Story, and Marilena from P7 were a result of his long, fruitful collaboration with the Romanian film director Cristian Nemescu. During the summer of 2006, the two of them were wrapping up work on Nemescu's debut feature California Dreamin' starring Armand Assante. On August 25, 2006, Toncu and Nemescu were killed in a car crash in Bucharest. The two filmmakers were riding in a taxi on their way home after completing the trailer for California Dreamin'. On Eroilor Bridge, the cab was struck by a Porsche Cayenne SUV driven by British citizen Ali Imran who ran a red light at the speed of 120 km/h.

A couple of days before the accident, Toncu had been invited to join the film team to work on special sound effects for Francis Ford Coppola's upcoming film Youth Without Youth.

In November 2006, the NexT Cultural Society was created in the memory of the two filmmakers. NexT organized the first annual short and medium length film festival NexT, which took place March 29–31, 2007 in Bucharest.

At the beginning of March 2007, during the award ceremony for the Romanian Union of Filmmakers, sound designer Toncu was posthumously awarded the 2006 prize for best sound.

== Filmography ==
- 2000 - Free Fall directed by Dorin Stana
- 2000 - Fragile, directed by Doru Nitescu
- 2001 - Mihai and Cristina, directed by Cristian Nemescu
- 2002 - Work Now, directed by Ion Puican
- 2003 - C Block Story, directed by Cristian Nemescu
- 2003 - Human & Bread, directed by Matei Branea
- 2004 - To Kill a Killer, directed by Ricardo Islas
- 2004 - Heaven, directed by Matei Branea
- 2006 - The Tube with a Hat, directed by Radu Jude
- 2006 - Marilena from P7 ,, directed by Cristian Nemescu
- 2006 - California Dreamin' (unfinished) , Cristian Nemescu director

== Awards ==
  - 2000 - Best Sound Prize - International Student Film Festival CineMAiubit
  - 2006 - 5.1 Surround Contest Winner
  - 2006 - Best Sound Prize - Romanian Union of Filmmakers
  - 2001 - 2007 - Participant in international awards received for films Mihai and Cristina, C Block Story, Marilena from P7, The Tube with the Hat and California Dreamin' .
