= Coyote Ugly (soundtrack) =

2000 film soundtrack

Soundtrack album by Various Artists
- Released: August 1, 2000
- Genre: Pop
- Length: 44:27
- Label: Curb
- Producers: Jerry Bruckheimer, Kathy Nelson, Mike Curb, Trevor Horn, Don Henley, Danny Kortchmar, Greg Ladayi, Ralph Jezzard, Snap!, John Boylan, Michael Lloyd, Don Cook, Chris Waters, Brad Gilderman, Harvey Mason Jr.

Singles from Coyote Ugly
- 1. "Can't Fight the Moonlight" Released: August 22, 2000; 2. "But I Do Love You" Released: February 9, 2001; 3. "The Right Kind of Wrong" Released: 2001

Coyote Ugly is the soundtrack album to the 2000 film of the same name. It was released through Curb Records on August 1, 2000, and feaured a compilation of pop songs performed LeAnn Rimes, who sing Violet's portions over the lead character, Piper Perabo, along with other artists such as Don Henley, EMF, Snap!, INXS, the Charlie Daniels Band, Tamara Walker, Rare Blend, Mary Griffin. The album was preceded by three singles—"Can't Fight the Moonlight", "But I Do Love You", and "The Right Kind of Wrong". The album was certified 4 x Platinum by the Recording Industry Association of America (RIAA) for selling four million units in the United States.

== Track listing ==
No.	Title	Recording artist(s)	Length
1.	"Can't Fight the Moonlight"	LeAnn Rimes	3:35
2.	"Please Remember"	Rimes	4:34
3.	"The Right Kind of Wrong"	Rimes	3:47
4.	"But I Do Love You"	Rimes	3:21
5.	"All She Wants to Do Is Dance"	Don Henley	4:30
6.	"Unbelievable"	EMF	3:30
7.	"The Power"	Snap!	3:40
8.	"Need You Tonight"	INXS	3:01
9.	"The Devil Went Down to Georgia"	The Charlie Daniels Band	3:36
10.	"Boom Boom Boom"	Rare Blend	3:22
11.	"Didn't We Love"	Tamara Walker	3:24
12.	"We Can Get There" (TP2K Hot Radio Mix)	Mary Griffin	3:59
Total length:			44:27

== Reception and commercial performance ==
In the United States, it was certified Gold within one month of its release and Platinum within three months. On July 22, 2008, the soundtrack was certified 4× Platinum. Internationally, it was certified 5× Platinum in Canada and Gold (100,000 units) in Japan in 2002.

Reviewing the soundtrack, Heather Phares of AllMusic wrote "the soundtrack's original songs don't mix especially well with the better-known pop songs. However, this probably won't bother the film's, and album's, target audience; the soundtrack's jumbled yet enjoyable mix of pop clichés mirrors the feel of the film perfectly." Laura Morgan of Entertainment Weekly assigned a "D" rating saying that, "the Coyote Ugly soundtrack sounds like a jukebox programmed by brain dead boozers."

== Charts ==
=== Weekly charts ===
Weekly chart performance for Coyote Ugly
Chart (2000–02)	Peak position
Australian Albums (ARIA)	1
Austrian Albums (Ö3 Austria)	2
Belgian Albums (Ultratop Flanders)	7
Belgian Albums (Ultratop Wallonia)	1
Canadian Albums (Billboard)	4
Danish Albums (Hitlisten)	6
Dutch Albums (Album Top 100)	60
Finnish Albums (Suomen virallinen lista)	9
French Albums (SNEP)	117
German Albums (Offizielle Top 100)	5
Hungarian Albums (MAHASZ)	14
Norwegian Albums (VG-lista)	3
Singapore Albums (SPVA)	1
Spanish Albums (Promusicae)	47
Swedish Albums (Sverigetopplistan)	29
Swiss Albums (Schweizer Hitparade)	9
US Billboard 200	9
US Top Country Albums (Billboard)	1
US Soundtrack Albums (Billboard)	3

=== Year-end charts ===
Year-end chart performance for Coyote Ugly
Chart (2000)	Position
Austrian Albums (Ö3 Austria)	40
Canadian Albums (Nielsen SoundScan)	57
Swiss Albums (Schweizer Hitparade)	89
US Billboard 200	135
US Top Country Albums (Billboard)	15

Chart (2001)	Position
Australian Albums (ARIA)	8
Austrian Albums (Ö3 Austria)	74
Belgian Albums (Ultratop Flanders)	41
Canadian Albums (Nielsen SoundScan)	12
Canadian Country Albums (Nielsen SoundScan)	1
European Albums (Music & Media)	96
German Albums (Offizielle Top 100)	96
Swiss Albums (Schweizer Hitparade)	97
US Billboard 200	31
US Top Country Albums (Billboard)	3
Worldwide Albums (IFPI)	36

Chart (2002)	Position
Canadian Albums (Nielsen SoundScan)	103
Canadian Country Albums (Nielsen SoundScan)	8
US Billboard 200	126
US Top Country Albums (Billboard)	14

== Certifications and sales ==
Region	Certification	Certified units/sales
Australia (ARIA)	2× Platinum	140,000^{^}
Austria (IFPI Austria)	Gold	25,000^{*}
Canada (Music Canada)	5× Platinum	500,000^{^}
Denmark (IFPI Danmark)	Gold	25,000^{^}
Japan (RIAJ)	Gold	100,000^{^}
South Korea	—	154,837
Spain (Promusicae)	Platinum	100,000^{^}
Switzerland (IFPI Switzerland)	Gold	25,000^{^}
United Kingdom (BPI)	Platinum	300,000^{‡}
United States (RIAA)	4× Platinum	4,000,000^{^}
Summaries
Europe (IFPI)	Platinum	1,000,000^{*}
^{*} Sales figures based on certification alone.^{^} Shipments figures based on certification alone.^{‡} Sales+streaming figures based on certification alone.

== More Music from Coyote Ugly ==
More Music from Coyote Ugly

Soundtrack album by Various Artists
- Released: January 28, 2003
- Genre: Pop
- Length: 40:20
- Label: Curb
- Producers: Jerry Bruckheimer, Kathy Nelson, Mike Curb, Trevor Horn, Don Henley, Danny Kortchmar, Greg Ladayi, Ralph Jezzard, Snap!, John Boylan, Michael Lloyd, Don Cook, Chris Waters, Brad Gilderman, Harvey Mason Jr.

A second soundtrack, More Music from Coyote Ugly, with more songs that appeared in the film and remixes of two of Rimes' songs, followed on January 28, 2003. Rovi of AllMusic reviewed the album, saying "an ideal disc for filling up the living room dance floor at just about any beer-fueled gathering, More Music from Coyote Ugly" of pure par-tay".

=== Track listing ===
No.	Title	Writer(s)	Recording artist(s)	Length
1.	"One Way or Another"	Debbie Harry; Nigel Harrison	Blondie	3:31
2.	"Rebel Yell"	Billy Idol; Steve Stevens	Billy Idol	4:47
3.	"Rock This Town"	Brian Setzer	Stray Cats	2:39
4.	"Keep Your Hands to Yourself"	Dan Baird	The Georgia Satellites	3:22
5.	"Out of My Head"	Tony Scalzo	Fastball	2:33
6.	"Battle Flag" (Lo-Fidelity Allstars Remix)	Steve Fisk; Shawn Smith	Pigeonhed	3:58
7.	"It Takes Two"	Robert Ginyard	Rob Base and DJ E-Z Rock	5:00
8.	"Love Machine"	Warren Moore; William Griffin	The Miracles	2:59
9.	"We Can Get There"	Deborah Allen	Mary Griffin	3:59

Bonus tracks
No.	Title	Writer(s)	Recording artist(s)	Length
10.	"Can't Fight the Moonlight" (Graham Stack Radio Edit)	Diane Warren	LeAnn Rimes	3:30
11.	"But I Do Love You" (Almighty Radio Edit)	Warren	Rimes	4:02
Total length:				40:20

== Other songs in the film ==
The following songs appear in the film, but are on neither of the two released soundtracks.

- "Party Up (Up in Here)" by DMX
- "Fly" by Sugar Ray
- "I Will Survive" by Gloria Gaynor
- "That's Me" by Tara MacLean
- "Pour Some Sugar on Me" by Def Leppard
- "Fly Away" by Lenny Kravitz
- "Beer:30" by Reverend Horton Heat
- "Follow Me" by Uncle Kracker
- "Cruisin' for a Bruisin'" by Nurse With Wound
- "Never Let You Go" by Third Eye Blind
- "Love Is Alive" by Anastacia
- "Cowboy" by Kid Rock
- "Tony Adams" by Joe Strummer & The Mescaleros
- "Cailin" by Unwritten Law
- "Can't Help Falling in Love" by Elvis Presley
- "Like Water" by Chalk Farm
- "I Love Rock N Roll" by Joan Jett & the Blackhearts
- "Wherever You Will Go" by The Calling (Fiji Mermaid Club scene)
