= Coyote Ugly (disambiguation) =

"Coyote Ugly" is a phrase that means "very ugly" and is applied to non-canine females/males.

Coyote Ugly may also refer to:

- Coyote Ugly Saloon, opened 1993, a bar in New York City, which spawned multiple franchises all over North America
- Coyote Ugly, a 2000 film based on the bar
- Coyote Ugly, 1985 play by Lynn Seifert of the Steppenwolf Theatre Company
