= Liliana Lovell =

American entrepreneur (born 1967)

- Born: September 29, 1967 (age 58); Westchester County, New York, U.S.
- Education: New York University (BA)
- Occupations: Entrepreneur; television host
- Years active: 1993–present
- Known for: Founder of Coyote Ugly Saloon, host of The Ultimate Coyote Ugly Search
- Spouse: Tony Piccirillo
- Website: www.coyoteuglysaloon.com/founder/

Liliana Lovell (born September 29, 1967) is an American entrepreneur who founded the Coyote Ugly Saloon and Ugly Inc. Lovell was the host of the reality TV show The Ultimate Coyote Ugly Search. In the 2000 movie Coyote Ugly, she was portrayed by Maria Bello.

== Early life and education ==
Liliana Lovell grew up in Westchester County, New York and graduated from New York University with a degree in psychology and communications. In college, she worked as a bartender in New York City.

== Career ==
While working on Wall Street as an investment banking intern, she made $200 a week. After making $300 a night pouring drinks, she started bartending at a cowboy bar, the Village Idiot, to make money full-time. Lovell managed the Village Idiot for three years, where she developed a routine of dancing on the bar, singing, and challenging customers to drinking contests. She learned her business model "beautiful girls + booze = money" from her boss, bar owner Tom McNeill.

=== Coyote Ugly Saloon ===
Lovell left to start her own bar with partner and now-husband Tony Piccirillo. They leased a failed Italian eatery across the street from the Village Idiot and opened the Coyote Ugly Saloon on January 27, 1993. Modeled after the Village Idiot, Coyote Ugly was one of the original cowboy bars in East Village. Others, like Doc Holliday's, and Yogi's, soon followed.

The Coyote Ugly Saloon was a popular local bar from 1993 to 1997. In 1997, the bar was propelled into the national spotlight when former bartender Elizabeth Gilbert wrote of her experiences in a story for GQ magazine, "The Muse of the Coyote Ugly Saloon." In it, she described Lovell's idea of a Coyote bartender:

Early in my own Coyote Ugly Saloon career, I made the mistake of saying to a customer, "Here's your beer, sir." Lil overheard and shouted, "Don't ever call anyone in this place 'sir'!" So I said, "I'm terribly sorry. I meant to say, 'Here's your beer, douche bag.'" Lil and the customer laughed. And I thought, Oh, I get it, but I am a very quick study. Some bartenders were friendly but not relaxed, so they didn't last. Some bartenders were gorgeous but not sexy, so what's the point? Some bartenders laughed a lot but were not funny themselves, so that didn't work, either.

Lovell hired young women and taught them her wild routine, which included such antics as chugging alcohol, setting light to it, and then breathing fire. While some were good at singing, others good at dancing, and others good at yelling, Lovell found that not all the women were talented in each of the three aspects, so she often paired women with complementary abilities.

=== Film ===
Disney bought the rights to Gilbert's story and adapted it into the movie Coyote Ugly, produced by Jerry Bruckheimer. A romantic comedy/drama released in August 2000, the film was directed by David McNally, written by Gina Wendkos. It starred Piper Perabo and featured a Lovell character played by Maria Bello. The film grossed over $61 million and received mixed reviews.

Tourists began packing Lovell's after the release of the movie looking for a re-creation of the experience.

== Ugly Inc. ==
Building on the national exposure, Lovell created Ugly Inc., a licensing company which follows a standard licensing scheme, in addition to a $50,000 fee, licensees pay 5% of gross and 25% of merchandise sales. In October 2001, the first franchise bar opened in Las Vegas, inside the New York, New York casino. Others were opened in Chicago, Atlanta, Boston, and San Diego. Lovell, herself, opened a bar in New Orleans.

As she planned to expand internationally, she discovered that Jorge Manterola, brother of Mexican singer Patricia Manterola, had set up a website for Coyote Ugly's "master franchise" in Latin America. The website claimed: "Just like you have seen in the movie, there will be very preety [sic] and sensual women from all over the world serving drinks, dancing on the bar, and doing the most funniest and unimaginable things." Lovell responded with legal action which resulted in a deal: She helped Manterola open a Coyote Ugly in Cabo San Lucas on the condition that he paid license royalties. While she could revoke the license if Manterola didn't pay, she had little control over the bar's operations.

In 2002, Ugly Inc. had revenues of $1.5 million from licensing fees and royalties. As of 2003, the nine bars collectively generated between $22 million and $24 million annually and employed 300 people. Building on her Cabo experience, Lovell decided to maintain controlling interest in all future Coyote Ugly Saloons in an effort to protect the brand.

By 2016, Russia had its sixth Coyote Ugly, in Sochi and the brand was estimated to be worth around $60 million.

== The Ultimate Coyote Ugly Search ==
In 2006, Lovell began hosting The Ultimate Coyote Ugly Search, a reality TV show on Country Music Television (CMT). The premise of the show involved Lovell auditioning young women to become the next "coyote". With the help from a few of her "coyote mentors", Lovell trained women to become bartenders, dancers, and all around entertainers. The winner received $25,000 and the title of "Ultimate Coyote".

In 2007, the series reappeared on CMT Canada. In this version, the series was based on teams. Lovell chose five of her best Coyotes from bars across the country. Each of those coyotes would then hold auditions at their home bars to find teammates for the competition. The teams for the competition were:

2007 Search Teams
Home Bar	Coyote	Apprentice
New York	Maria	Regan
Charlotte	Kat	Stephanie
Memphis	Bri	Sandra "Mexico"
Nashville	Sally	Molly "Ice"
Fort Lauderdale	"Wiggins"	Amanda "Red"

Team New York won in 2007, and were awarded $50,000. The third and final season of the show was held in 2008.
