= Kassie Miller =

American singer-songwriter

Kasie Miller
- Origin: Cullman, Alabama
- Labels: BMI

Kassie Miller is an American television personality, model and singer–songwriter from Nashville, Tennessee.

== Life and career ==
In 2000, Miller graduated from Albert P. Brewer High School in Somerville, Alabama. Miller studied music at Judson College, a private Baptist women's college in Marion, Alabama, but dropped out after her freshman year. At 19 years old, she moved to Nashville to pursue a career in country music. She appeared in country singer Trace Adkins' music video for the song "Songs About Me" (2004), filmed at the Wildhorse Saloon in Nashville.

Kassie appeared on Fox's reality television show Forever Eden (2004), where contestants stayed at a luxury resort until they're removed or they quit. The show failed to find an audience and was dropped from Fox's schedule after one month.

At 23 years old, Miller auditioned for the first season of CMT's The Ultimate Coyote Ugly Search (2006) with a Gretchen Wilson song. The show followed a group of girls in the hope of getting a job at the Coyote Ugly Saloon and win $25,000. Miller became the winner and signed a record deal with BMI.

== Filmography ==
Television roles
| Year | Title | Role | Notes |
|---|---|---|---|
| 2004 | Forever Eden | Herself | 24 episodes |
| 2006 | The Ultimate Coyote Ugly Search | Herself | 8 episodes |
| 2009 | Can You Duet | Herself | Episodes: "Open Audition Day", "Singles Becomes Duos" |
