= I Need You (album) =

- Original cover art

Compilation album by LeAnn Rimes
- Released: January 30, 2001
- Recorded: 1999–2002
- Studio: SARM West Coast, The Town House (London, England); Royal Tone, The Village Recorders (Los Angeles, California); East Iris (Nashville, Tennessee)
- Genre: Pop; country pop
- Length: 39:07
- Label: Curb
- Producer: Wilbur C. Rimes; LeAnn Rimes; Chuck Howard; Mike Curb; Trevor Horn; Peter Collins; David Foster

LeAnn Rimes chronology
LeAnn Rimes (1999)	I Need You (2001)	God Bless America (2001)

Singles from I Need You
- 1. "But I Do Love You" Released: February 9, 2001; 2. "I Need You" Released: March 19, 2001 (UK); 3. "Soon" Released: August 13, 2001; 4. "Can't Fight the Moonlight" Released: October 2, 2001 (re-release)

I Need You is a compilation album by American recording artist LeAnn Rimes. The album was first released on January 30, 2001, through Curb Records to help satisfy Rimes's recording contract obligations following her issuance of a lawsuit against the label. The original release of the album consists of four previously released soundtrack appearances alongside six new tracks. Rimes publicly disowned the album just days after its release, but despite her comments, Curb continued to promote the record and released three singles in support of the album. The album was re-released on March 26, 2002, with four additional remixes and the new recording "Light the Fire Within".

I Need You received mixed reviews from music critics, who noted Rimes's gradual move away from country and towards pop-leaning adult contemporary music. In the United States, the album peaked at number one on the Billboard Top Country Albums chart and reached number ten on the Billboard 200. Internationally, it peaked at number four on the Finnish Albums Chart, number ten on the Canadian Albums Chart, and number eleven on both the Austrian Albums Chart and the Irish Album Chart. I Need You was certified platinum in the United States and Canada and was certified gold in four further countries.

The album contains the hit singles "Written in the Stars", "I Need You", and "Can't Fight the Moonlight", which were released as singles from soundtracks prior to the album's release. The latter was a major hit worldwide, reaching the top of the charts in the United Kingdom and Australia. Following the release of I Need You, Curb Records released "But I Do Love You" and "Soon" as singles; both songs were also included on soundtracks. Internationally, "I Need You" served as the second single from the album. The record was further promoted with a re-release of "Can't Fight the Moonlight" in 2001; the song would go on to peak at number 11 in the United States in 2002.

== Background and development ==
In November 2000, Rimes sued Curb Records in an effort to have her recording contract with the label nullified; it had originally been signed on her behalf by her parents in 1995. Subsequently, I Need You was released to help satisfy Rimes's recording contract obligations with the label. During litigation with the label, Rimes asked "that Curb give Rimes the rights to all past recordings and videos, give up all publishing interests in her compositions and destroy all currently available recordings." Rimes claimed that she was unaware of album's planned release until a month prior to it being issued. According to her management, the new songs on the album stemmed from as early as 1999 and were finished without her input.

The album was publicly disowned by Rimes two days after its 2001 release, with Rimes stating that: "This album was made without my creative input. It consists largely of unfinished material and songs that didn't make other albums [...] I want to make abundantly clear to you that this album is not a reflection of myself as an artist but is solely the conception of Curb Records, and for that I am truly and deeply sorry." Rimes's father (Wilbur Rimes), with whom the singer was also in dispute with, had production credits on 8 of the 10 songs on the album. Wilbur Rimes issued a statement that said "I believe this is one of the best albums LeAnn has ever recorded. The songs she chose for this album demonstrate her newfound maturity and the continuing development of her tremendous talent. These were all finished masters, and LeAnn loved the way it all came together when it was complete". Curb Records released a statement that said "We believe that I Need You is the best album that [Rimes] has ever recorded. Nevertheless, we are excited about the new musical directions that LeAnn is exploring for the future, and, as always, we respect her talent and her opinions." Curb Records continued to promote the album despite Rimes's comments. In November 2001, Rimes was released from her original contract with Curb Records and she subsequently signed a new agreement with the label under new terms.

Four songs on the album were previously released. The duet with Elton John, "Written in the Stars", was released as a single on February 23, 1999, from the concept album, Elton John and Tim Rice's Aida. The album contains the "alternate version" of the song, previously included as the second track on the single. "I Need You" was included on the Jesus: Music From and Inspired by the Epic Mini Series soundtrack released on March 8, 2000. It was released as a single on July 18, 2000, for the soundtrack. "But I Do Love You" and "Can't Fight the Moonlight" were included on the soundtrack for Coyote Ugly on August 1, 2000. "Can't Fight the Moonlight" was released as a single for the soundtrack on August 22, 2000, with "But I Do Love You" as its b-side. The version of "But I Do Love You" that appears on the initial release of I Need You is a new remix which was also sent to country radio stations. The cover photograph on I Need You was previously used in the Coyote Ugly soundtrack liner notes and as the single art for "Can't Fight the Moonlight".

== Release and promotion ==
"You Are"
The chorus of "You Are", a pop song of four minutes and fifty-eight seconds and is written by Laurie Webb.

"Soon"
The chorus of "Soon", a ballad song that peaked at number fourteen on the Billboard Adult Contemporary Charts. The song is written by Diane Warren.

The album was first released on January 30, 2001, by Curb Records. Three singles were released from the album. After having previously been the b-side to "Can't Fight the Moonlight", "But I Do Love You" was released as a single from both the Coyote Ugly soundtrack and I Need You on February 11, 2002. Though "I Need You" was initially released in the United States as a single from the Jesus soundtrack on July 18, 2000, it was subsequently released internationally as a single from I Need You on March 19, 2001. "Soon" was released in August 2001 as the album's final single in the United States. The song, written by Diane Warren, was also featured on the soundtrack for Driven, released on April 27, 2001. It peaked at fourteen on the Billboard Adult Contemporary Chart. "You Are" was released as a promotional single in 2001 and was featured on the soundtrack for Angel Eyes. In its initial release in August 2000 prior to the release of I Need You, "Can't Fight the Moonlight" was a major hit internationally, but only peaked at number 70 on the Billboard Hot 100 in the United States. The single was re-released in October 2001 and given a further promotional push with a remix by Graham Stack, and later peaked at number 11 in 2002.

The album was reissued on March 26, 2002. It contains all ten tracks from the 2001 release plus four bonus remixes and "Light the Fire Within", which Rimes performed at the 2002 Winter Olympics opening ceremony in Salt Lake City. "But I Do Love You" is in an alternate mix on the original release of I Need You, but was included in its original Coyote Ugly soundtrack version on the reissue. The version of "You" on the reissue is an extended version.

== Critical reception ==
Professional ratings
Review scores
Source	Rating
About.com	4/5 stars
AllMusic	2.5/5 stars
Entertainment Weekly	C+
MTV Asia	7/10
Rolling Stone	2.5/5 stars
The Rolling Stone Album Guide	1/5 stars

I Need You received generally mixed reviews from music critics. Mark Huxley at Barnes & Noble gave a positive review of the album, saying that Rimes is "comfortably adopting some distinctly modern sonic elements without sacrificing her tradition-steeped country roots." The Philippine Star felt that despite being "culled from assorted sources" the album "comes across as the best crafted of all the albums that LeAnn has recorded". Chris Neal from Country Weekly praised the album and Rimes's vocal performance, saying that "all the songs are solid". However, he also noted that "most of the songs have only a tenuous connection to country" and said "how you feel about I Need You will largely depend on whether you see LeAnn’s shift toward pop as a positive development."

Stephen Thomas Erlewine of AllMusic gave a mixed review, calling it "her first full-fledged pop album" with "footing squarely within adult contemporary pop". He stated that Rimes's "impressive voice sounds restrained in this setting, too self-consciously mature. In a nutshell, that's the problem with I Need You - it's a teenager attempting to make a thirtysomething album. That she occasionally succeeds is a testament to her vocal talents and the skills of her producers, but it shouldn't be surprising that it also feels awkward for large stretches, never quite becoming as alluring as Breathe, because this is a sound that she needs to grow into to be totally convincing." Arion Berger from Rolling Stone gave the album two-and-a-half out of five stars and called the album "synthetic-feeling." He praised Rimes's vocal performance and described the album as being closer to adult contemporary than country. Trisha Huenke of About.com gave the album four out of five stars and praised it for its pop sound, stating that, "Finally we have an artist who is straightforward about the fact that she wants to sing pop music." Alanna Nash of Entertainment Weekly gave a mixed review of the album. She criticized "Written in the Stars", calling it a "slugfest duet". She praised the inclusion of "But I Do Love You" and "Can't Fight the Moonlight" but said "you'll snooze through the rest."

== Commercial performance ==
I Need You debuted and peaked at number ten on the Billboard 200, with 84,915 copies sold in its first week. It spent four weeks in the top fifty and a total of thirty weeks in Billboard 200. It also debuted at number one on the Billboard Top Country Albums chart.

Internationally, the album was a success, peaking at number four on the Finnish Albums Chart, number ten on the Canadian Albums Chart, and at number eleven on both the Austrian Albums Chart and the Irish Album Charts. The album also peaked at number five on the Swedish Albums Chart and number six on the Swiss Albums Chart. It peaked at number seven on both the UK Albums Chart and the European Top 100 Albums chart.

On the year-end charts, I Need You peaked at number five in Finland and at thirteen on the Billboard Top Country Albums chart. The album was certified Platinum by the RIAA and Music Canada. The album was certified Gold by IFPI Denmark, the Recording Industry Association of New Zealand, the International Federation of the Phonographic Industry and the British Phonographic Industry.

== Track listing ==
Original release
No.	Title	Writer(s)	Producer(s)	Length
1.	"I Need You"	Dennis Matkosky, Ty Lacy	Wilbur C. Rimes, L. Rimes	3:48
2.	"But I Do Love You" (Remix)	Diane Warren	Trevor Horn	3:21
3.	"You Are"	Laurie Webb	W. Rimes	3:45
4.	"Soon"	Warren	W. Rimes, Chuck Howard, Mike Curb	3:53
5.	"Can't Fight the Moonlight"	Warren	Horn	3:35
6.	"Love Must Be Telling Me Something"	J. T. Corenflos, Keith Follesé, Thomas McHugh	W. Rimes	3:43
7.	"Written in the Stars" (Duet with Elton John)	Elton John, Tim Rice	Peter Collins, W. Rimes	4:19
8.	"One of These Days"	Christi Dannemiller, Robin Lee Bruce	W. Rimes	4:40
9.	"I Believe in You"	Dan Muckala, Lacy	W. Rimes	4:25
10.	"Together, Forever, Always"	L. Rimes, Ron Grimes	W. Rimes	3:38
Total length:				39:07

Japanese bonus track
No.	Title	Writer(s)	Producer(s)	Length
11.	"Can't Fight the Moonlight" (Graham Stack Radio Edit)	Warren	Horn, Graham Stack^{[a]}	3:30
Total length:				42:37

UK edition
No.	Title	Writer(s)	Producer(s)	Length
1.	"I Need You"	Matkosky, Lacy	W. Rimes, L. Rimes	3:48
2.	"Can't Fight the Moonlight"	Warren	Horn	3:35
3.	"Written in the Stars" (Duet with Elton John)	John, Rice	Collins, W. Rimes	4:19
4.	"You Are"	Webb	W. Rimes	3:45
5.	"Soon"	Warren	W. Rimes, Howard, Curb	3:53
6.	"But I Do Love You" (Remix)	Warren	Horn	3:20
7.	"One of These Days"	Dannemiller, Bruce	W. Rimes	4:38
8.	"Love Must Be Telling Me Something"	Corenflos, Follesé, McHugh	W. Rimes	3:43
9.	"I Believe in You"	Muckala, Lacy	W. Rimes	4:25
10.	"Together, Forever, Always"	L. Rimes, Grimes	W. Rimes	3:38
11.	"Can't Fight the Moonlight" (Latino Mix)	Warren	Horn, Graham Stack^{[a]}	3:30
12.	"Soon" (Graham Stack Radio Edit)	Warren	W. Rimes, Graham Stack^{[a]}	4:44
13.	"I Need You" (Dave Audé Radio Edit)	Matkosky, Lacy	W. Rimes, L. Rimes, Dave Audé^{[a]}	4:22
Total length:				51:43

China bonus CD
No.	Title	Writer(s)	Producer(s)	Length
1.	"Can't Fight the Moonlight" (Almighty Mix)	Warren	Horn, Almighty Associates^{[a]}	7:52
2.	"Can't Fight the Moonlight" (Sharp Radio Edit)	Warren	Horn, The Sharp Boys^{[a]}	3:38
3.	"I Need You" (Almighty Mix)	Matkosky, Lacy	W. Rimes, L. Rimes, Almighty Associates^{[a]}	6:55
4.	"I Need You" (Graham Stack Mix)	Matkosky, Lacy	W. Rimes, L. Rimes, Graham Stack^{[a]}	6:30
Total length:				24:55

2002 reissue
No.	Title	Writer(s)	Producer(s)	Length
1.	"Light the Fire Within"	Foster, Thompson	Foster	4:46
2.	"I Need You"	Matkosky, Lacy	W. Rimes, L. Rimes	3:48
3.	"But I Do Love You" (Original Version)	Warren	Horn	3:21
4.	"You Are" (Extended Version)	Webb	W. Rimes	4:58
5.	"Soon"	Warren	W. Rimes, Howard, Curb	3:53
6.	"Can't Fight the Moonlight"	Warren	Horn	3:35
7.	"Love Must Be Telling Me Something"	Corenflos, Follesé, McHugh	W. Rimes	3:43
8.	"Written in the Stars" (Duet with Elton John)	John, Rice	Collins, W. Rimes	4:19
9.	"One of These Days"	Dannemiller, Bruce	W. Rimes	4:40
10.	"I Believe in You"	Muckala, Lacy	W. Rimes	4:25
11.	"Together, Forever, Always"	L. Rimes, Grimes	W. Rimes	3:38
12.	"Can't Fight the Moonlight" (Graham Stack Radio Edit)	Warren	Horn, Graham Stack^{[a]}	3:30
13.	"But I Do Love You" (Almighty Radio Edit)	Warren	Horn, Almighty Associates^{[a]}	4:02
14.	"Soon" (Graham Stack Radio Edit)	Warren	W. Rimes, Howard, Curb, Graham Stack^{[a]}	4:01
15.	"I Need You" (Graham Stack Radio Edit)	Matkosky, Lacy	W. Rimes, L. Rimes, Graham Stack^{[a]}	3:41

Notes

- ^a signifies a remixer

== Personnel ==
Credits for I Need You were adapted from liner notes. Additional credits adapted from liner notes of the Coyote Ugly soundtrack, the Jesus: Music From and Inspired by the Epic-Mini Series soundtrack, and the Aida concept album.

- Almighty Associates – producer, remixer
- Eddie Bayers – drums
- Curt Bisquera – drums
- Mike Brignardello – bass guitar
- Charlie Brocco – assistant engineer on "Written in the Stars"
- David Campbell – orchestral arrangement
- Sue Ann Carwell – background vocals
- The Choristers of Cathedral of the Madeleine Choir School – background vocals on "Light the Fire Within"
- Peter Collins – producer
- Mike Curb – producer
- Austin Deptula – assistant engineer, additional engineer, engineer, keyboards
- David Foster – arrangement, producer
- Micheal "Grimey" Grimes – drums
- Omar Hakeem – drums, percussion
- Mike Hanna – additional arrangement
- Niki Harris – background vocals
- Carl Herrgesell – harmonium, Wurlitzer
- John Holbrook – mixer, engineer, recording
- Trevor Horn – producer
- Chuck Howard – producer
- Greg Hunt – chief engineer, additional engineer
- Andrew Pryce Jackman – orchestral arrangement
- Elton John* – musical director, vocals on "Written in the Stars"
- Annagray Labasse – background vocals
- Gary Leach – assistant engineer, additional engineer, engineer, keyboards
- Keith Lockhart – music director for Utah Symphony
- Steve MacCillan – mixer, engineer
- Edgar Meyer – acoustic bass
- Kenny Mims – acoustic guitar electric guitar
- Jamie Muhoberac – bass guitar, keyboards
- Tim Pierce – electric guitar
- LeAnn Rimes – lead vocals, co-producer, background vocals
- Wilbur C. Rimes – producer
- John "J.R." Robinson – drums
- William Ross – orchestrations, conductor
- Lee Sklar – bass guitar
- Graham Stack – producer, remixer
- Edward Szymczak – assistant engineer on "Written in the Stars"
- Utah Symphony – orchestra
- Fred Vaughn – choir arrangement
- Marty Walsh – acoustic guitar, electric guitar, mandolin
- Tim Weidner – additional engineer
- Craig Young – bass guitar

*Note: According to the liner notes, Elton John appears courtesy of The Rocket Record Company.

== Charts and certifications ==
=== Weekly charts ===
Chart (2001)	Peak position
Australian Albums (ARIA)	29
Austrian Albums (Ö3 Austria)	11
Belgian Albums (Ultratop Flanders)	25
Canadian Albums (Billboard)	10
Danish Albums (Hitlisten)	2
Dutch Albums (Album Top 100)	67
European Top 100 Albums	7
Finnish Albums (Suomen virallinen lista)	4
French Albums (SNEP)	29
German Albums (Offizielle Top 100)	14
Hungarian Albums (MAHASZ)	20
Irish Albums (IRMA)	11
Italian Albums (FIMI)	18
Japanese Albums (Oricon)	35
New Zealand Albums (RMNZ)	12
Norwegian Albums (VG-lista)	13
Scottish Albums (OCC)	6
Swedish Albums (Sverigetopplistan)	5
Swiss Albums (Schweizer Hitparade)	6
UK Albums (OCC)	7
UK Country Albums (OCC)	1
US Billboard 200	10
US Top Country Albums (Billboard)	1

=== Year-end charts ===
Chart (2001)	Position
Canadian Albums (Nielsen SoundScan)	85
Canadian Country Albums (Nielsen SoundScan)	5
Danish Albums (Hitlisten)	40
Finnish Albums (Suomen virallinen lista)	5
Swiss Albums (Schweizer Hitparade)	76
UK Albums (OCC)	122
US Billboard 200	143
US Top Country Albums (Billboard)	13

Chart (2002)	Position
Canadian Country Albums (Nielsen SoundScan)	41
US Top Country Albums (Billboard)	46

=== Sales and certifications ===
Region	Certification	Certified units/sales
Canada (Music Canada)	Platinum	100,000^{^}
Denmark (IFPI Danmark)	Gold	25,000^{^}
New Zealand (RMNZ)	Gold	7,500^{^}
United Kingdom (BPI)	Gold	100,000^{^}
United States (RIAA)	Platinum	1,000,000^{‡}
^{^} Shipments figures based on certification alone.^{‡} Sales+streaming figures based on certification alone.

== Release history ==
Country	Label	Format	Date	Catalog No.
Canada	Curb Records	Compact disc	January 30, 2001	D2-77979
Canada	Curb Records	Compact disc	March 26, 2002	D2-78738
China	WEA Records	Compact disc	April 6, 2001	80927401292
Japan	Curb Denon Records	Compact disc	February 21, 2001	COCB-50492
Japan	Curb Denon Records	Compact disc	April 20, 2002	COCB-53019
United States	Curb Records	Compact disc, cassette tape	January 30, 2001	D2-77979
United States	Curb Records	Compact disc, cassette tape	March 26, 2002	D2-78738
United Kingdom	Curb Records, London Records	Compact disc	April 2, 2001	8573876382
