= Table dance =

Type of erotic dance

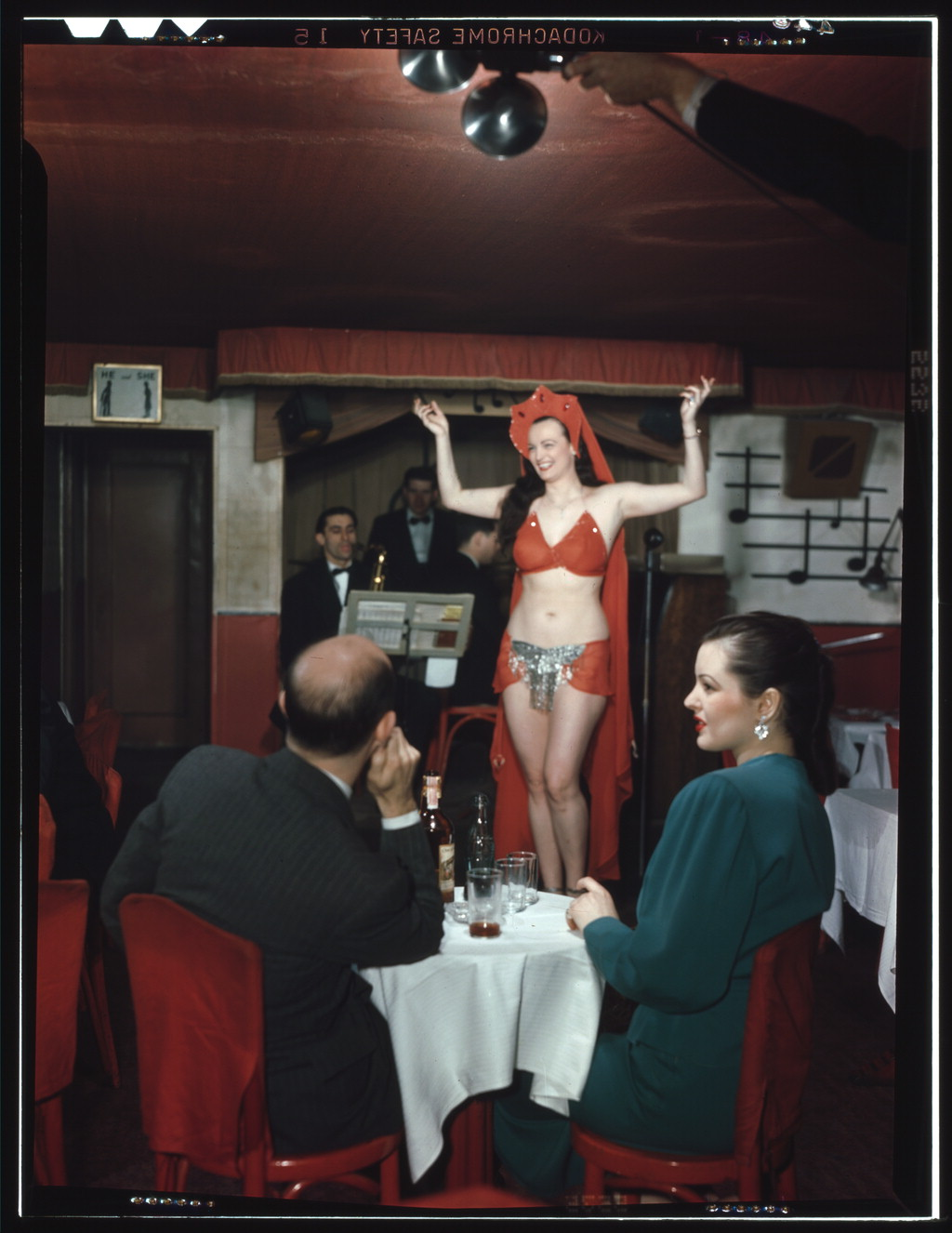
A dancer at Club Nocturne, New York, New York, 1940s

A table dance, or bartop dance, is a dance performed at (or on) a table or bar, as opposed to on a stage. It may be an erotic dance performed by a sex worker or it may be done as a leisure activity.

== Sex work ==
In strip clubs, a table dance is a semi-private sexual performance that takes place near or on a customer's table. In some jurisdictions, a table dance may be an alternative to a lap dance, due to laws preventing exotic dancers from making contact with customers. For example, in Waterloo, Ontario, a table dance is performed on a small portable platform the dancer takes around to patrons’ tables. The Windmill Theatre in Soho, London operated as a strip club from the 1990s until 2018. The club's licensing conditions included a "no touching" rule and the club had a licence for striptease, pole-dancing and table dancing. In many clubs, dancers earn most of their money from tips for table dancing.

== Establishments ==
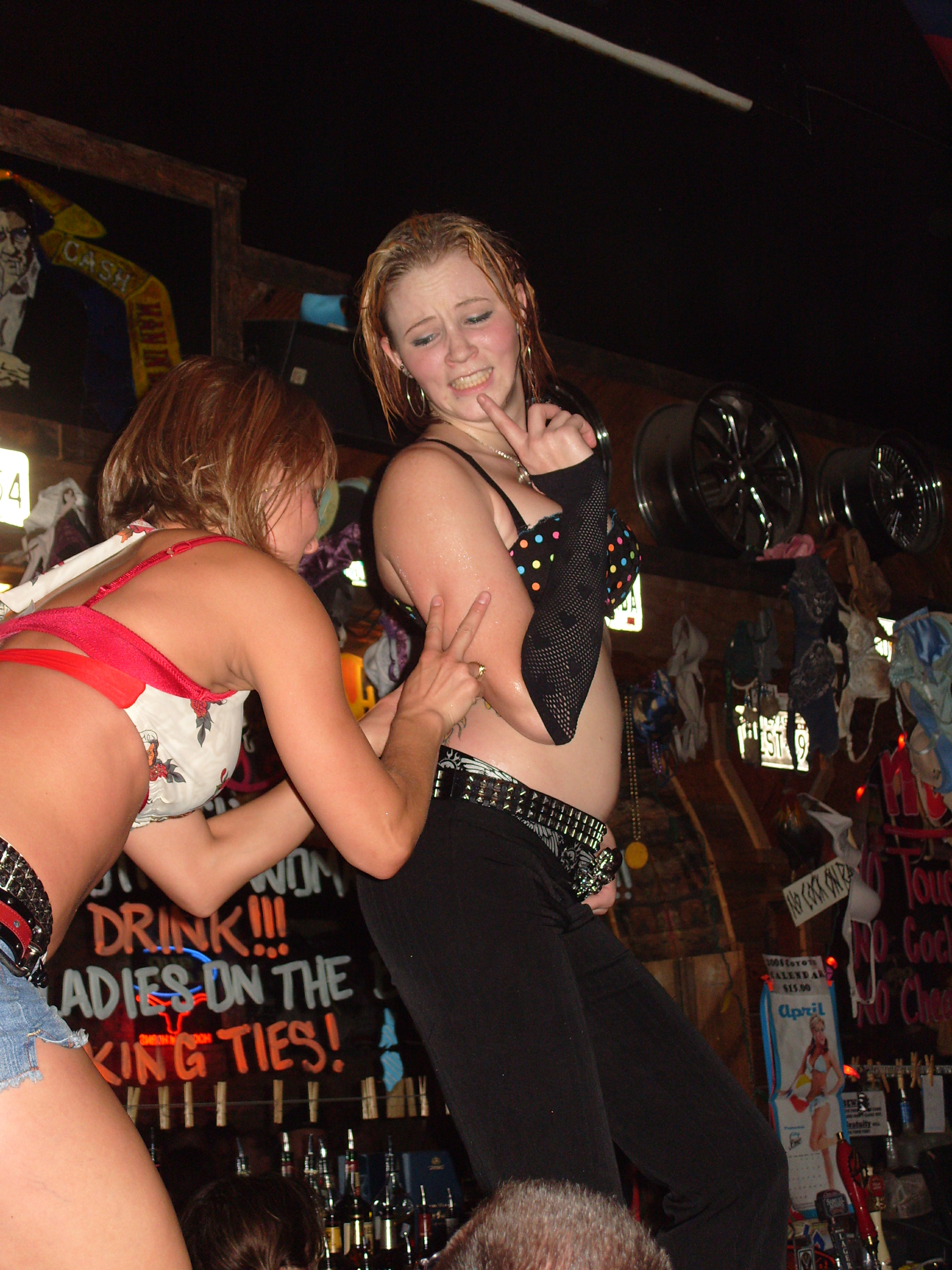
Bartop dancing is encouraged at Coyote Ugly's chain of bars.

The bartop dance, performed for the entertainment of those seated at the bar, is similar to the table dance. The film Coyote Ugly, set in the New York City bar of the same name, led to a fashion for bartop dancing establishments. Several bars around the city (e.g. Coyote Ugly, Hogs and Heifers, Red Rock West Saloon, Doc Holliday's Saloon) actively encouraged women to jump on the bar and dance, contributing to an "Anything Goes" atmosphere. Hogs and Heifers encourages dancers to leave their brassiere hanging from the ceiling to commemorate their dance. However, table dancing is forbidden at many events and establishments.

Table dancing by patrons (both male and female) became more common in New York after the enforcement of the City's cabaret licenses (required for dancing establishments) was relaxed around the time of the 2001 election of Mayor Michael Bloomberg. In 2002, the Hilton sisters Paris and Nicky were reputed to be constant table dancers at club Bungalow 8. Nicky denied the allegations and claimed that they only dance on the banquettes, and added that she did it purely "because it was fun". At another restaurant named Da Silvano, it was reported that Kim Cattrall, Candace Bushnell and Patricia Duff were seen table dancing together. Duff said "Somebody placed me up on the table, so I danced," and that the night was "spontaneous and magical".

== Carnivals and festivals ==
Another form of table dance is practiced at traditional events like in Brazilian, European and Australian Carnivals, in German beer tents during Oktoberfest, and at other similar events. However, this kind of table dance is not of an erotic nature. As this dance often leads to accidents, especially if performed by intoxicated individuals, it is often forbidden at many events, but dancing on chairs or benches may still be allowed.

== See also ==
- Bargirl
- Burlesque
- Erotic dancing
  - Go-go dancing
  - Lap dance
- Legal status of striptease
