= Can't Fight the Moonlight =

2000 single by LeAnn Rimes

Single by LeAnn Rimes

from the album Coyote Ugly
- B-side: "But I Do Love You"
- Released: August 22, 2000
- Studio: SARM West Coast, The Ashley Neal Room, Royal Tone, The Mastering Lab (Los Angeles)
- Genre: Pop
- Length: 3:33
- Label: Curb, London
- Songwriter: Diane Warren
- Producer: Trevor Horn

LeAnn Rimes singles chronology
"I Need You" (2000)	"Can't Fight the Moonlight" (2000)	"But I Do Love You" (2001)

Music video
- "Can't Fight the Moonlight" on YouTube

"Can't Fight the Moonlight" is a song by the American singer LeAnn Rimes, written by Diane Warren and produced by Trevor Horn. It is the theme song of the film Coyote Ugly. Released as a single on August 22, 2000, the song topped the charts of 10 countries, including Australia, where it was the highest-selling single of 2001. In the United States, it reached number 11 on the Billboard Hot 100 and was the top-selling country single of both 2001 and 2002.

The song appeared on Rimes's I Need You (2002) compilation album and The Best of LeAnn Rimes (2004). The Graham Stack radio edit of the song (known as the "Latino Mix" internationally) was included as a bonus track on I Need You and on More Music from Coyote Ugly (2003). The remix was also included on Greatest Hits (2003) as well as on the remix edition of her Best of album. A music video was released in 2000 including clips from Coyote Ugly with Rimes performing at the "Coyote Ugly" bar.

== Background ==
Rimes originally auditioned for the 2000 film Coyote Ugly to sing "Can't Fight the Moonlight" at the ending with Piper Perabo but, once Rimes watched some cuts of the film, she decided to provide the singing voice for all the songs sung by Perabo. In the film, the song has a fictional story of being written by main character Violet Sanford, which at the end of the film becomes her big break into the music business after Rimes records it. Rimes later shared with her audience of a 2017 concert that she really wanted “Can't Fight The Moonlight”, but it was attached to Coyote Ugly. She agreed to sing for Piper Perabo on the movie because she so badly wanted to sing “Can't Fight The Moonlight” (this would include "But I Do Love You", as well as two other tracks on the soundtrack). The vocals Rimes provided are altered in their pitch and vocal range in comparison to her natural vocal range; and, the closing scene, wherein she and Perabo's character sing, is effectively her duetting with herself. The song's lyrics were slightly changed for film.

"Can't Fight the Moonlight" (2000)
A thirty second sample of Rimes's "Can't Fight the Moonlight", from the Coyote Ugly soundtrack.

"Can't Fight the Moonlight" is a pop song of 3 minutes and 35 seconds. The song was written by American Grammy Award-winning songwriter, Diane Warren and performed by Rimes. The song's sheet music shows the key of E-flat major with the first and second verses in B minor. The song is produced by Trevor Horn with executive production by Jerry Bruckheimer, Kathy Nelson and Mike Curb. Orchestral arrangements were done by David Campbell with engineering and mixing done by Steve MacMillan. Additional engineering was done by Tim Weidner, Greg Hunt, Gary Leach and Austin Deptula. According to Warren it is the first song she had written with so many key changes. A review by Billboard praised producer Trevor Horn by stating "Oh-so creatively produced by Trevor Horn with guitars, lush layers of harmony, and a funky albeit delicate hip-hop track (no, really), this easy-flowing midtempo popper is a sassy number, demonstrating that Rimes has crossed the line to adult-leaning lyrics."

== Release ==
"Can't Fight the Moonlight" was first released on the soundtrack for Coyote Ugly on August 1, 2000. It was released in the US on a CD single on August 22, 2000, along with the song, "But I Do Love You" (also included on the soundtrack) as the B-side track. The song was later released on a maxi-single which included several remixes of the song. The song was also included on Rimes's 2002 compilation album, I Need You, with the Graham Stack Radio Edit of the song included as a bonus track. In 2003, the Graham Stack Radio Edit of the song would be included on the More Music from Coyote Ugly soundtrack on January 28, 2003. and Rimes' Greatest Hits album on November 18, 2003. In 2004, the song was included on The Best of LeAnn Rimes, while the Graham Stack Radio Edit (known as the "Latino Mix" internationally) was released on the remixed edition. In 2014, a new remix of the song by The Alias was released on her second greatest hits remix album, Dance Like You Don't Give a... Greatest Hits Remixes. In 2018, Rimes released a live re-reimagined version of the song to digital download and streaming services that was later included on her Re-Imagined EP. In 2020, in celebration of the film's 20th anniversary, a new remix by Dave Audé was released.

== Critical reception ==
Wendy Mitchell of Barnes & Noble.com praised the song calling it "ultra-catchy". Heather Phares of AllMusic considered the song to be a "positively Britney Spearsian power ballad". A review in Billboard about Rimes and the song stated that the song "is by far her most compelling pop offering yet–and one of the more intriguing compositions of late from songwriter superwoman Diane Warren."

== Commercial performance ==
The song reached the top 20 in every country it charted in. In the United Kingdom, "Can't Fight the Moonlight" topped the UK Singles Chart for the week ending November 25, 2000, becoming Britain's 12th biggest-selling song of 2000. It sold over 530,000 copies in the United Kingdom and was the 55th best seller of the 2000s decade in the country. In the Republic of Ireland, it topped the Irish Singles Chart in November 2000 for two weeks.

In Australia, "Can't Fight the Moonlight" topped the ARIA Singles Chart in January 2001 and went on to become the biggest-selling single in Australia of 2001. It went triple platinum in Australia, selling over 210,000 copies. In New Zealand, it went to number one on the New Zealand Singles Chart.

In the US, the song spent two chart runs on the Billboard Hot 100. On its original chart run in 2000, "Can't Fight the Moonlight" stalled at number 71. It regained interest in late 2001 and 2002 and rose up the charts to number 11. It took 29 weeks to reach the top 40, a record at the time for longest time to reach the top 40. The song spent 42 weeks on the charts and sold 668,000 copies. Even though the song was not officially released to country radio, it debuted at number 61 on the Billboard Country Song chart due to airplay as an album cut. It topped the year end chart for Billboard's US Top Country Singles Sales, in 2001 and 2002, the only song to do so two years in a row. The single was certified platinum by the RIAA. The single has sold over two million copies worldwide.

== Music video ==
A music video for the song was released in 2000 by Touchstone Pictures and directed by David McNally, the director of Coyote Ugly. The video features Rimes wearing a white tank top and brown striped latex pants singing at the "Coyote Ugly" bar, and dancing with Izabella Miko and the other girls who worked at the bar in the film. The video also features various scenes taken from the film. The music video was included as a bonus feature on both the theatrical and uncut DVD releases of the film.

== Live performances ==
On February 1, 2001, Rimes performed the song on Music in High Places. The performance was later featured on the limited edition bonus DVD included with her Greatest Hits album. On April 10, she performed it live at the 7th Blockbuster Entertainment Awards. On May 9, she performed a "beat box-driven" version of the song live at the 36th Academy of Country Music Awards, being accompanied by bare-chested dancers. Rimes also performed the song on Sessions@AOL. On an episode of the second season of I Can See Your Voice, Rimes performed "Can't Fight the Moonlight" as the final duet with that episode's winning mystery singer.

== Covers and samples ==
South Korean singer Lee Hyori performed the song during 2003's MBC Drama Awards. American singer Ava Max interpolated the song on her 2022 single "Million Dollar Baby".

== Track listings ==
- Australian CD single
1. "Can't Fight the Moonlight" – 3:35
2. "But I Do Love You" – 3:20
3. "Can't Fight the Moonlight" (Graham Stack Radio Edit) – 3:35
4. "Can't Fight the Moonlight" (Thunderpuss Club Mix) – 8:46
5. "Can't Fight The Moonlight" (Sharp Club Vocal Mix) – 7:35
6. "Can't Fight the Moonlight" (Almighty Mix) – 7:52
- European CD single
1. "Can't Fight the Moonlight" – 3:35
2. "But I Do Love You" – 3:20
3. "Can't Fight the Moonlight" (Graham Stack Radio Edit) – 3:35
- European CD maxi single
1. "Can't Fight the Moonlight" (Latino Mix) – 3:32
2. "Can't Fight the Moonlight" (Thunderpuss Club Mix) – 8:45
3. "Can't Fight the Moonlight" (Almighty Radio Edit) – 3:58
4. "Can't Fight the Moonlight" (Sharp Radio Edit) – 3:38
- US CD and cassette single
1. "Can't Fight the Moonlight" – 3:35
2. "But I Do Love You" – 3:20
- US maxi-CD single, US and UK digital download
1. "Can't Fight the Moonlight" (Graham Stack Radio Edit) – 3:35
2. "Can't Fight the Moonlight" (Thunderpuss Radio Edit) – 3:36
3. "Can't Fight the Moonlight" (Plasmic Honey Radio Edit) – 3:22
4. "Can't Fight the Moonlight" (Almighty Mix) – 7:49
5. "Can't Fight the Moonlight" (Sharp Club Vocal Edit) – 5:40
6. "Can't Fight the Moonlight" (Thunderpuss Club Mix) – 8:46
7. "Can't Fight the Moonlight" (Plasmic Honey Club Mix Edit) – 6:37
8. "Can't Fight the Moonlight" (Sharp Pistol Dub) – 5:46
- Digital download – Re-Imagined
1. "Can't Fight the Moonlight" (Re-Imagined) [Live] – 4:40
- Digital download – Dave Audé Remix
1. "Can't Fight the Moonlight" (Dave Audé Mix) – 4:02
2. "Can't Fight the Moonlight" (Dave Audé Extended) – 5:04
3. "Can't Fight the Moonlight" (original mix) – 3:36

== Personnel ==
Personnel for "Can't Fight the Moonlight" adapted from the liner notes of the Coyote Ugly soundtrack.

- Steve MacMillan – engineer, mixing
- Tim Pierce – guitar
- Jamie Muhoberac – keyboards, bass
- Lee Sklar – bass
- John Robinson – drums
- Curt Bisquera – drums
- Alan Pasqua – piano
- David Campbell – orchestra arrangement
- Sue Ann Carwell – background vocals
- LeAnn Rimes – lead vocals, background vocals
- Niki Harris – background vocals
- Tim Weidner – additional engineering
- Greg Hunt – additional engineering
- Gary Leach – additional engineering
- Austin Deptula – additional engineering
- Sara Lind – technical assistance
- Robert Orton – technical assistance
- Gavin Lurssen – mastering

== Charts ==
=== Weekly charts ===
Chart (2000–2002)	Peak position
Australia (ARIA)	1
Austria (Ö3 Austria Top 40)	8
Belgium (Ultratop 50 Flanders)	1
Belgium (Ultratop 50 Wallonia)	3
Canada (Nielsen SoundScan)	6
Canada CHR (Nielsen BDS)	19
Denmark (Tracklisten)	3
Europe (Eurochart Hot 100)	3
Finland (Suomen virallinen lista)	1
France (SNEP)	3
Germany (GfK)	8
Greece (IFPI Greece)	5
Hungary (Mahasz)	1
Ireland (IRMA)	1
Italy (FIMI)	2
Netherlands (Dutch Top 40)	1
Netherlands (Single Top 100)	1
New Zealand (Recorded Music NZ)	1
Norway (VG-lista)	2
Poland Airplay (Music & Media)	6
Poland (Polish Airplay Charts)	2
Romania (Romanian Top 100)	1
Scottish Singles Sales (Official Charts)	1
Sweden (Sverigetopplistan)	1
Switzerland (Schweizer Hitparade)	2
UK Singles (Official Charts)	1
US Billboard Hot 100	11
US Pop Airplay (Billboard)	8
US Adult Contemporary (Billboard)	15
US Adult Pop Airplay (Billboard)	25
US Dance Club Songs (Billboard)	17
US Dance Singles Sales (Billboard)	3
US Hot Country Songs (Billboard)	61
US Top Country Singles Sales (Billboard) with "But I Do Love You"	1

Chart (2025)	Position
Moldova Airplay (TopHit)	75

=== Year-end charts ===
Chart (2000)	Position
Ireland (IRMA)	3
Sweden (Hitlistan)	72
UK Singles (OCC)	12
US Top Country Singles Sales (Billboard)	7

Chart (2001)	Position
Australia (ARIA)	1
Austria (Ö3 Austria Top 40)	40
Belgium (Ultratop 50 Flanders)	12
Belgium (Ultratop 50 Wallonia)	16
Canada (Nielsen SoundScan)	119
Europe (Eurochart Hot 100)	5
France (SNEP)	24
Germany (Media Control)	34
Ireland (IRMA)	74
Netherlands (Dutch Top 40)	44
Netherlands (Single Top 100)	21
New Zealand (RIANZ)	7
Romania (Romanian Top 100)	23
Sweden (Hitlistan)	24
Switzerland (Schweizer Hitparade)	27
UK Singles (OCC)	142
US Adult Contemporary (Billboard)	45
US Maxi-Singles Sales (Billboard)	19
US Top Country Singles Sales (Billboard)	1

Chart (2002)	Position
Canada Radio (Nielsen BDS)	78
US Billboard Hot 100	56
US Adult Contemporary (Billboard)	29
US Adult Top 40 (Billboard)	51
US Mainstream Top 40 (Billboard)	39
US Maxi-Singles Sales (Billboard)	25
US Top Country Singles Sales (Billboard)	1

Chart (2025)	Position
Estonia Airplay (TopHit)	182

=== Decade-end charts ===
Chart (2000–2009)	Position
Australia (ARIA)	46
Netherlands (Single Top 100)	34
US Hot Singles Sales (Billboard)	12

== Certifications ==
Region	Certification	Certified units/sales
Australia (ARIA)	3× Platinum	210,000^{^}
Belgium (BRMA)	Platinum	50,000^{*}
Denmark (IFPI Danmark)	Gold	4,000^{^}
Denmark (IFPI Danmark)	Gold	45,000^{‡}
France (SNEP)	Gold	250,000^{*}
Netherlands (NVPI)	Platinum	60,000^{^}
New Zealand (RMNZ)	Platinum	30,000^{‡}
Sweden (GLF)	Platinum	30,000^{^}
Switzerland (IFPI Switzerland)	Gold	25,000^{^}
United Kingdom (BPI)	2× Platinum	1,200,000^{‡}
United States (RIAA)	Platinum	1,000,000^{‡}
^{*} Sales figures based on certification alone.^{^} Shipments figures based on certification alone.^{‡} Sales+streaming figures based on certification alone.

== Release history ==
Release dates and formats for "Can't Fight the Moonlight"
Region	Version	Date	Format(s)	Label(s)	Ref.
United States	Original	August 22, 2000	CD single	Curb	
United States	Original	September 5, 2000	Contemporary hit radio	Curb	
United States	Original	September 11, 2000	Adult contemporary; hot adult contemporary radio	Curb	
United Kingdom	Original	November 13, 2000	CD single; cassette single	Curb; London	
Japan	Original	December 1, 2000	CD single	Curb Denon	
Australia	Original	January 2001	CD single	Curb	
United States (re-release)	Original	October 2, 2001	Contemporary hit radio	Curb	
Various	Re-Imagined (live)	May 30, 2018	Digital download; streaming	EverLe/Thirty Tigers	
Various	Dave Audé remix	November 13, 2020	Digital download; streaming	Curb	

== See also ==
- Dutch Top 40 number-one hits of 2000
- List of number-one singles from the 2000s (UK)
- List of number-one singles of 2000 (Ireland)
- List of songs by Diane Warren
- List of Swedish number-one hits
- List of number-one singles in Australia in 2001
- List of number-one singles from the 2000s (New Zealand)
- List of Romanian Top 100 number ones of the 2000s
- Ultratop 50 number-one hits of 2001
