= I Need You (LeAnn Rimes song) =

2000 single by LeAnn Rimes

Single by LeAnn Rimes

from the album Jesus: Music from and Inspired by the Epic Mini-Series and I Need You
- B-side: "Spirit in the Sky"
- Released: March 20, 2000
- Studio: Rosewood (Tyler, Texas)
- Genre: Country pop; CCM
- Length: 3:48
- Label: Curb; Capitol; Sparrow
- Songwriters: Dennis Matkosky; Ty Lacy
- Producers: Acrynon Production Group (Jesus: Music from and Inspired by the Epic Mini-Series); Wilbur C. Rimes, LeAnn Rimes (I Need You)

LeAnn Rimes singles chronology
"Crazy" (1999)	"I Need You" (2000)	"Can't Fight the Moonlight" (2000)

"I Need You" is a song written by Dennis Matkosky and Ty Lacy and recorded by American country pop artist LeAnn Rimes. It was released on March 20, 2000, as a single from Jesus: Music from and Inspired by the Epic Mini-Series. The following year, it was released internationally as a single from the compilation of the same name. The song spent 25 weeks on the US Billboard Hot 100 and peaked at number 11, and it was also successful outside the US, reaching the top 20 in Canada, Denmark, Finland, Ireland, Spain, Sweden, and the United Kingdom. A music video was released in 2000.

== Background and release ==
"I Need You" was released in the United States as a single from the Jesus soundtrack. On March 20, 2000, it was released to adult contemporary and hot adult contemporary radio; it was released to retail on July 25, 2000. The song was included on her 2001 compilation I Need You. Internationally, the song was released as a single from the compilation on March 19, 2001.

"I Need You" was included on her greatest hits albums Greatest Hits (2003), Best of (2004), and All-Time Greatest Hits (2015). Remixes of the song were featured on her remix albums The Best of LeAnn Rimes: Remixed (2004) and Dance Like You Don't Give a.... Greatest Hits Remixes (2014). A country mix of the song was included on the compilation Wings of a Dove (2000).

Rimes donated her artist fees and royalties from this song to fund and build a therapeutic rehabilitation wing — the "LeAnn Rimes Adventure Gym" — at the Vanderbilt Children's Hospital in Nashville, Tennessee (Remz).

== Composition ==
"I Need You" (2000)
A 27-second mple of Rimes' "I Need You", from the Jesus: Music From & Inspired by the Epic Mini Series soundtrack.

"I Need You" is a Christian pop song with a runtime of 3 minutes and 48 seconds. It was written by Dennis Matkosky and Ty Lacy, and is in the key of G major with Rimes' vocals spanning two octaves, from E_{3} to D_{5}.

== Critical reception ==
Entertainment Weekly music critic David Browne gave "I Need You" a "C+" grade and wrote, "This schlock-deluxe ballad finds Rimes in full-diva mode, swooning and growling like a Celine Dion impersonator on Your Big Break." According to Carson James, Curb VP of Promotion, "I Need You" was used as the "primary vehicle for pre-promotion" of the "Jesus" mini-series (Country Corner, 2000) that aired on CBS in May 2000 and was the lead track featured on the album. A review by Billboard stated, "Not since her pop breakthrough "How Do I Live" almost three years ago has [LeAnn] Rimes brought forth a song so naturally beautiful and well-suited to her rich, enveloping vocal style."

== Chart performance ==
In the United States, the song spent 25 weeks on the Billboard Hot 100 and peaked at number 11. The song also reached number 8 on the Billboard Country Songs chart, as well as number 2 on the Billboard Adult Contemporary chart. It received a Gold certification from the Recording Industry Association of America for shipping over 500,000 copies domestically. Internationally, "I Need You" peaked within the top 20 in Canada, Denmark, Finland, Ireland, Spain, Sweden, and the United Kingdom.

== Music video ==
The music video for the song features Rimes singing solo in a minimally furnished, abandoned house. The first 2/3's of the video features Rimes in a tan and white shirt with tan leather pants while in the darkness lit by a spotlight that travels across the room in the background while different colored leaves are billowing about. There are close-up shots of her face as she's singing and various poses of her swaying, moving and dancing to the song. After the second verse the spotlight stops in her midsection and the scenes are flooded with light. Then her outfit changes to white but she and the music video continue as before. The video was directed by Joe Rey. On July 22, 2014, as a promotion for her Dance Like You Don't Give a.... Greatest Hits Remixes (2014) album, Rimes released the Digital Dog remix of the music video.

== Track listings ==
US CD single

1. "I Need You" by LeAnn Rimes — 3:48
2. "Spirit in the Sky" by dc Talk — 3:43

US remix digital download

1. "I Need You" (Dave Aude radio edit) — 4:24
2. "I Need You" (Graham Stack radio edit) — 3:44
3. "I Need You" (Almighty radio edit) — 3:44
4. "I Need You" (Lenny B radio edit) — 3:49
5. "I Need You" (Lenny B radio edit with intro) — 3:50
6. "I Need You" (Graham Stack extended mix) — 6:30
7. "I Need You" (Dave Aude mix) — 7:48
8. "I Need You" (Bertoldo mix) — 8:22
9. "I Need You" (Dataluxe mix) — 9:08
10. "I Need You" (Almighty mix) — 6:55
11. "I Need You" (Lenny B club mix) — 6:21

UK single

1. "I Need You" (original version) — :48
2. "I Need You" (Graham Stack radio edit) — 3:43

UK maxi-CD

1. "I Need You" — 3:48
2. "I Need You" (Lenny B radio edit) — 3:49
3. "Sittin' on Top of the World" (Aurora Borealis radio edit) — 4:36
4. "I Need You" (video)

European maxi-CD

1. "I Need You" (Graham Stack radio edit) — 3:43
2. "I Need You" (Almighty mix edit) — 3:42
3. "I Need You" (Dave Aude radio edit) — 4:23
4. "I Need You" (Dataluxe club mix edit) — 5:45

== Charts ==
=== Weekly charts ===
Weekly chart performance for "I Need You"
Chart (2000–2001)	Peak position
Australia (ARIA)	51
Belgium (Ultratop 50 Flanders)	48
Canada (Nielsen SoundScan)	18
Canada Adult Contemporary (RPM)	2
Canada Country Singles (RPM)	16
Denmark (Tracklisten)	15
Europe (Eurochart Hot 100)	52
Finland (Suomen virallinen lista)	10
Germany (GfK)	63
Ireland (IRMA)	19
Italy (FIMI)	25
Netherlands (Single Top 100)	81
Scottish Singles Sales (Official Charts)	10
Spain (Promusicae)	15
Sweden (Sverigetopplistan)	20
UK Singles (Official Charts)	13
US Billboard Hot 100	11
US Adult Contemporary (Billboard)	2
US Adult Pop Airplay (Billboard)	34
US Hot Country Songs (Billboard)	8
US Top Country Singles Sales (Billboard)	1

=== Year-end charts ===
2000 year-end chart performance for "I Need You"
Chart (2000)	Position
US Billboard Hot 100	44
US Adult Contemporary (Billboard)	9
US Adult Top 40 (Billboard)	69
US Hot Country Singles & Tracks (Billboard)	27
US Hot Soundtrack Singles (Billboard)	5
US Top Country Singles Sales (Billboard)	5

2001 year-end chart performance for "I Need You"
Chart (2001)	Position
Sweden (Hitlistan)	96
UK Singles (OCC)	200
US Adult Contemporary (Billboard)	7

2002 year-end chart performance for "I Need You"
Chart (2002)	Position
US Adult Contemporary (Billboard)	34

== Certifications ==
Certifications for "I Need You"
Region	Certification	Certified units/sales
France (SNEP)	Gold	250,000^{*}
United States (RIAA)	Gold	500,000^{*}
^{*} Sales figures based on certification alone.

== Release history ==
Release dates and formats for "I Need You"
Region	Date	Format(s)	Label(s)	Ref(s).
United States	March 20, 2000	Adult contemporary; hot AC radio	Curb; Capitol; Sparrow	
United States	April 25, 2000	Contemporary hit radio	Curb; Capitol; Sparrow	
United States	July 25, 2000	CD single; cassette single	Curb; Capitol; Sparrow	
United Kingdom	March 19, 2001	CD single; cassette single	Curb; London	

== Covers ==
In 2001, Anna Fegi released the song for her album, Every Step of the Way. The song was covered again in 2003 by Christian singer, Kristy Starling, on her eponymous debut album. In 2005, Filipino singer Mark Bautista covered this song for his second studio album Dream On.
