= Soon (LeAnn Rimes song) =

Single by LeAnn Rimes

from the album I Need You
- Released: August 13, 2001
- Genre: adult contemporary; country
- Length: 3:53
- Label: Curb
- Songwriter(s): Diane Warren
- Producer(s): Wilbur C. Rimes; Chuck Howard; Mike Curb

LeAnn Rimes singles chronology
| "But I Do Love You" (2001) | "Soon" (2001) | "God Bless America" (2001) |

"Soon" is a song recorded by American country music recording artist LeAnn Rimes for her compilation album I Need You (2001). It was written by Diane Warren. It was released on August 13, 2001 to adult contemporary radio as a single from the record. The song was produced by Rimes's father Wilbur C. Rimes, Chuck Howard, and Mike Curb; a remix produced by Graham Stack appeared on the reissue of I Need You and on the international releases of the album. "Soon" was also included in the soundtrack for the 2001 film Driven.

"Soon" peaked at number 14 on the US Adult Contemporary chart.

== Content ==
"Soon" is a ballad with a runtime of three minutes and 53 seconds. The song is in the key of D-flat major while Rimes' vocals span two octaves, from G_{3} to E_{5}. It lyrically shows Rimes trying to tell herself to forget an ex.

== Critical reception ==
Chuck Taylor of Billboard gave a mostly neutral review. He said, "This outing is pleasant enough, but it's far from new turf. Perhaps Rimes had the right idea."

== Commercial performance ==
"Soon" only entered the Billboard Adult Contemporary chart. It entered the chart the week of September 15, 2001, at number 30. It reached a peak position of number 14 on the chart the week of February 23, 2002, spending 26 weeks in total on the chart.

== Track listing ==
- Digital EP (Remixes)
1. "Soon" (Graham Stack Radio Edit) – 3:59
2. "Soon" (Graham Stack Radio Edit W/ Intro) – 4:34
3. "Soon" (Graham Stack Extended Mix) – 6:17
4. "Soon" (Hex Hector/Dezrok Radio Mix) – 3:54
5. "Soon" (Hex Hector/Dezrok Club Mix) – 9:11
6. "Soon" (Hex Hector/Dezrok Dub) – 9:30
7. "Soon" (Dataluxe Radio Edit) – 4:15
8. "Soon" (Dataluxe Extended Mix) – 7:58
9. "Soon" (Almighty Radio Edit) – 4:16
10. "Soon" (Almighty Extended Mix) – 7:40

== Charts ==
=== Weekly charts ===
| Chart (2001–2002) | Peak position |
|---|---|
| US Adult Contemporary (Billboard) | 14 |

=== Year-end charts ===
| Chart (2002) | Position |
|---|---|
| US Adult Contemporary (Billboard) | 42 |
