= Tamara Walker =

American singer-songwriter

- Born: May 1, 1966 (age 60); Maryland, United States
- Genres: Country, pop
- Occupation: Singer-songwriter
- Instrument: Vocals
- Years active: 1999–2012
- Label: Curb Records

Tamara Walker (born May 1, 1966) is an American singer-songwriter and a former beauty pageant titleholder. Walker began her career as Miss Maryland where she placed in the Top 10 at the Miss America pageant.

In 2000 she signed with Curb Records. She also signed a publishing deal with Sony Tree. Initially, Walker recorded country music, but the label decided to release her to the Pop AC market. Subsequently, her first single went to country radio but the country album went unreleased. Then, in 2001, Curb Records released her debut album, Angel Eyes, and she charted three singles on the Billboard Hot Adult Contemporary Tracks chart. The title track of her debut album was the theme song to the 2001 Jennifer Lopez film, Angel Eyes. After leaving music behind, she shifted her career to real estate, working as a Douglas Elliman agent as of late 2018.

== Discography ==
=== Albums ===
| Title | Album details |
|---|---|
| Angel Eyes | Release date: September 17, 2002; Label: Curb Records |

=== Singles ===
| Year | Single | Peak chart positions | | | Album |
| Year | Single | US Country | US Country Sales | US AC | Album |
|---|---|---|---|---|---|
| 1999 | "Giants" | — | — | — | —N/a |
| 2000 | "Askin' Too Much" | 65 | — | — | —N/a |
| 2000 | "Didn't We Love" | 69 | — | — | Coyote Ugly (soundtrack) |
| 2001 | "Didn't We Love" (remix) | — | 10 | 21 | Angel Eyes |
| 2002 | "Angel Eyes" | — | — | 24 | Angel Eyes |
| 2002 | "If Only" | — | — | 23 | Angel Eyes |
"—" denotes releases that did not chart

=== Music videos ===
| Year | Video | Director |
|---|---|---|
| 2000 | "Askin' Too Much" | Trey Fanjoy |
| 2000 | "Didn't We Love" | Trey Fanjoy |
| 2002 | "Angel Eyes" | |
