= Jesus (1999 film) =

1999 Italian-American miniseries

- DVD cover
- Teleplay by: Suzette Couture
- Directed by: Roger Young
- Starring: Jeremy Sisto; Jacqueline Bisset; Armin Mueller-Stahl; Debra Messing; Gary Oldman
- Music by: Patrick Williams
- Countries of origin: Italy; United States
- Original languages: English; Italian

Production
- Producers: Russell Kagan; Roberta Cadringher
- Cinematography: Raffaele Mertes
- Editor: Benjamin A. Weissman
- Running time: 174 minutes (without commercials)
- Budget: $17 million

Original release
- Network: CBS
- Release: December 5 – December 6, 1999
- Release: May 14 – May 15, 2000

Jesus is a 1999 Italian-American biblical historical drama television miniseries that retells the historical events of Jesus Christ. It was shot in Morocco and Malta. It stars Jeremy Sisto as the titular character, Jacqueline Bisset as Mary of Nazareth, Debra Messing as Mary Magdalene and Gary Oldman as Pontius Pilate. The miniseries was broadcast in Italy in two parts on December 5 and 6, 1999 before being broadcast in the United States on May 14 and 15, 2000 on CBS.

== Plot ==
The film's chronology entails a cinematic blending of the Four Gospels with the addition of extra-biblical elements not found in the New Testament accounts. It provides a down to earth approach through its focus on the human aspect of Jesus. Compared to more solemn and divine portrayals in earlier films, Jesus expresses emotions weeping at Joseph's funeral, throwing stones in Lake Galilee upon meeting Simon Peter and James son of Zebedee, dancing at the wedding at Cana, and starting a water-splashing fight with his disciples.

While the film mainly presented familiar Christian Episodes, it provides extra-biblical scenes such as flashbacks of his first trip to Jerusalem with John as well as scenes of war and destruction waged in the name of Jesus during the medieval and modern times. Likewise, the film's Satan comes in two different forms: a visual exemplification of a modern man and a woman in red, instead of the traditional snake that can be found in most films. The film also adds a composite character, an apocryphal Roman historian named "Livio" who watches and comments as events unfold; he is presumably named after Livy.

As it appears in the credits, it was dedicated in memory of Enrico Sabbatini.

Two actors who played disciples of Jesus in the miniseries appeared once again as disciples in the 2013 miniseries The Bible and the 2014 feature film adapted from it, Son of God. Sebastian Knapp, who played Matthew in Jesus, played John, son of Zebedee in The Bible. Said Bey, who played Thaddeus in Jesus, played Matthew in The Bible.

== Cast ==
- Jeremy Sisto as Jesus
- Jacqueline Bisset as Mary, mother of Jesus
- Armin Mueller-Stahl as Joseph the carpenter
- Debra Messing as Mary Magdalene
- David O'Hara as John the Baptist
- G. W. Bailey as Livio
- Luca Barbareschi as Herod Antipas
- Christian Kohlund as Caiaphas
- Stefania Rocca as Mary of Bethany
- Luca Zingaretti as Simon Peter
- Ian Duncan as John, son of Zebedee
- Elena Sofia Ricci as Herodias
- Gilly Gilchrist as Andrew
- Thomas Lockyer as Judas Iscariot
- Claudio Amendola as Barabbas
- Jeroen Krabbé as male Satan
- Gary Oldman as Pontius Pilate
- Gabriella Pession as Salome
- Maria Cristina Heller as Martha
- Manuela Ruggeri as female Satan
- Peter Gevisser as Lazarus
- Fabio Sartor as James, son of Zebedee
- Sebastian Knapp as Matthew
- Sean Harris as Thomas
- Karim Doukkali as Philip
- Said Bey as Jude Thaddeus
- Abedelouhahad Mouaddine as James, son of Alphaeus
- El Housseine Dejjiti as Simon the Zealot
- Mohammed Taleb as Bartholomew
- Omar Lahlou as Nathanael
- Roger Hammond as Joseph of Arimathea

== Soundtrack ==
Jesus: Music from and Inspired by the Epic Mini-Series

Soundtrack album by Various Artists
- Released: March 8, 2000
- Genre: Gospel
- Label: Capitol Records/Sparrow Records
- Producers: Bill Hearn, Eddie Degarmo, Evan Lamberg, Mike Curb, Russel Kagan, Saul Melnick, Lorenzo Minoli, Patrick Williams, Acrynon Production Group, Edwin McCain, Craig Shields, Scott Bannevich, Larry Chaney, Dave Harrison, Greg Archilla, Steven Curtis Chapman, Adam Anders, Toby McKeehan, Michael Tait, Mick Guzauski, 98 Degrees, Big Baby, Sugar Mike, Dan Huff, Mark Hammond, Keith Thomas, Mark Heimermann, Don Dixon, David R. Murray

Singles from Jesus: Music from and Inspired by the Epic Mini-Series
- 1. "I Need You" Released: March 20, 2000 (radio) / July 25, 2000 (retail); 2. "Spirit in the Sky"; 3. "Fly to You" Released: June 12, 2000

Professional ratings
Review scores
Source	Rating
Allmusic	3/5 stars

A soundtrack, Jesus: Music from and Inspired by the Epic Mini-Series, was released on March 8, 2000, for the series. "I Need You" was released as a single for the soundtrack by American country music recording artist LeAnn Rimes. "Spirit in the Sky" by dc Talk was also released as a B side with "I Need You".

No.	Title	Recording artist(s)	Length
1.	"Jesus" (Theme from the original soundtrack)	Patrick Williams	2:49
2.	"I Need You"	LeAnn Rimes	3:48
3.	"Jesus, He Loves Me"	Eric McCain	4:36
4.	"Nobody Ever (Only You)"	Steven Curtis Chapman	4:27
5.	"Spirit in the Sky"	dc Talk	3:44
6.	"The Love That You've Been Looking For"	98 Degrees	4:33
7.	"Shining Star"	Yolanda Adams	3:33
8.	"Love Can Change Your Mind"	Lonestar	4:17
9.	"Fly to You"	Avalon	3:49
10.	"When You Walked Into My Life"	Jaci Velasquez	3:46
11.	"City by a River"	Hootie & the Blowfish	3:49
12.	"Pie Jesu"	Sarah Brightman	3:55

== See also ==
- Bible Collection
- 1999 in American television
- List of films shot in Malta
- List of foreign films shot in Morocco
