= But I Do Love You =

2001 single by LeAnn Rimes

Single by LeAnn Rimes

from the album Coyote Ugly and I Need You
- A-side: "Can't Fight the Moonlight"
- Released: February 9, 2001
- Length: 3:20
- Label: Curb
- Songwriter: Diane Warren
- Producer: Trevor Horn

LeAnn Rimes singles chronology
| "Can't Fight the Moonlight" (2000) | "But I Do Love You" (2001) | "Soon" (2001) |

Licensed audio
- "But I Do Love You" on YouTube

"But I Do Love You" is a song recorded by American country music artist LeAnn Rimes. It was released as a single from the Coyote Ugly soundtrack and from Rimes' 2002 compilation album, I Need You. It was released in the US on February 9, 2001 and in the UK on February 11, 2002. The song was written by Diane Warren.

It peaked at number 18 on the US Billboard Country Songs chart. Internationally it peaked at 20 on UK Singles Chart and 48 on the Irish Singles Chart.

== Background ==
The song is from the 2000 film Coyote Ugly and was originally intended to be sung by American stage, film and television actress, Piper Perabo, but after her audition to sing "Can't Fight the Moonlight" and watching the film, American country pop artist LeAnn Rimes decided to record all the songs for the film and provide the singing voice for Perabo. The theatrical trailer for the film included Perabo's original recording of the song prior to Rimes recording it.

== Release ==
"But I Do Love You" was first released on the soundtrack for Coyote Ugly on August 1, 2000. It was later released as a B-side track to the single "Can't Fight the Moonlight" on August 22, 2000. The song was released to country radio in the U.S. on February 9, 2001 as the first single from I Need You. It was released in the UK the following year on February 11, 2002.

The song was included on The Best of LeAnn Rimes (2004). The Almighty Radio Edit of the song was included as a bonus track on the 2002 reissue of I Need You, More Music from Coyote Ugly (2003), and The Best of LeAnn Rimes: Remixed (2004). In 2020, in celebration of the film's 20th anniversary, a new remix by Dave Audé was released.

== Composition ==
"But I Do Love You" (2001)
A twenty-nine second sample of Rimes' "But I Do Love You", from the Coyote Ugly soundtrack.

"But I Do Love You" is a song of three minutes and twenty seconds. It was written by Diane Warren and recorded by LeAnn Rimes. The song is written in the key of C major with Rimes' vocals spanning two octaves, from B_{3} to B_{4} The song is produced by Trevor Horn with executive production by Jerry Bruckheimer, Kathy Nelson and Mike Curb. Orchestral arrangements were done by David Campbell with engineering and mixing done by Steve MacMillan. Additional engineering was done by Tim Weidner, Greg Hunt, Gary Leach and Austin Deptula.

== Critical reception ==
The song received a favorable review from Deborah Evans Price of Billboard, who wrote that "Rimes is an ever-evolving stylist of the first degree, and she nails this catchy midtempo track from start to finish." Another review in Billboard, from 2000, stated that the song is "beautifully written" and that it is "AC-hitworthy." Heather Phares of Allmusic considered the song a "Jewel-esque love song".

== Chart performance ==
The song debuted at number sixty on the US Billboard Hot Country Singles & Tracks chart for the week of February 24, 2001 and peaked at number eighteen.

Internationally the song peaked at number twenty on the UK Singles Chart and number forty-eight on the Irish Singles Chart.

== Track listing ==
UK CD single

1. But I Do Love You — 3:20
2. But I Do Love You (Ian Van Dahl Radio Edit) — 3:35
3. Can't Fight the Moonlight (Latino Mix) — 3:35

Digital Download

1. But I Do Love You (Almighty Radio Edit) — 4:05
2. But I Do Love You (Almighty Extended Mix) — 7:14
3. But I Do Love You (Ian Van Dahl Radio Edit) — 3:35
4. But I Do Love You (Ian Van Dahl Extended Mix) — 8:10

US "Can't Fight the Moonlight" CD/Cassette tape single

1. "Can't Fight the Moonlight" — 3:35
2. "But I Do Love You" — 3:20

Digital Download- Dave Audé Remix

1. "But I Do Love You" (Dave Audé Mix) - 3:17
2. "But I Do Love You" (Dave Audé Extended Mix) - 4:12
3. "But I Do Love You" - 3:21

== Charts ==
| Chart (2001) | Peak position |
|---|---|
| Irish Singles Chart | 48 |
| UK Singles (OCC) | 20 |
| US Bubbling Under Hot 100 (Billboard) | 3 |
| US Hot Country Songs (Billboard) | 18 |
| US Top Country Singles Sales (Billboard) with "Can't Fight the Moonlight" | 1 |
