= Maria Bello =

American actress (born 1967)

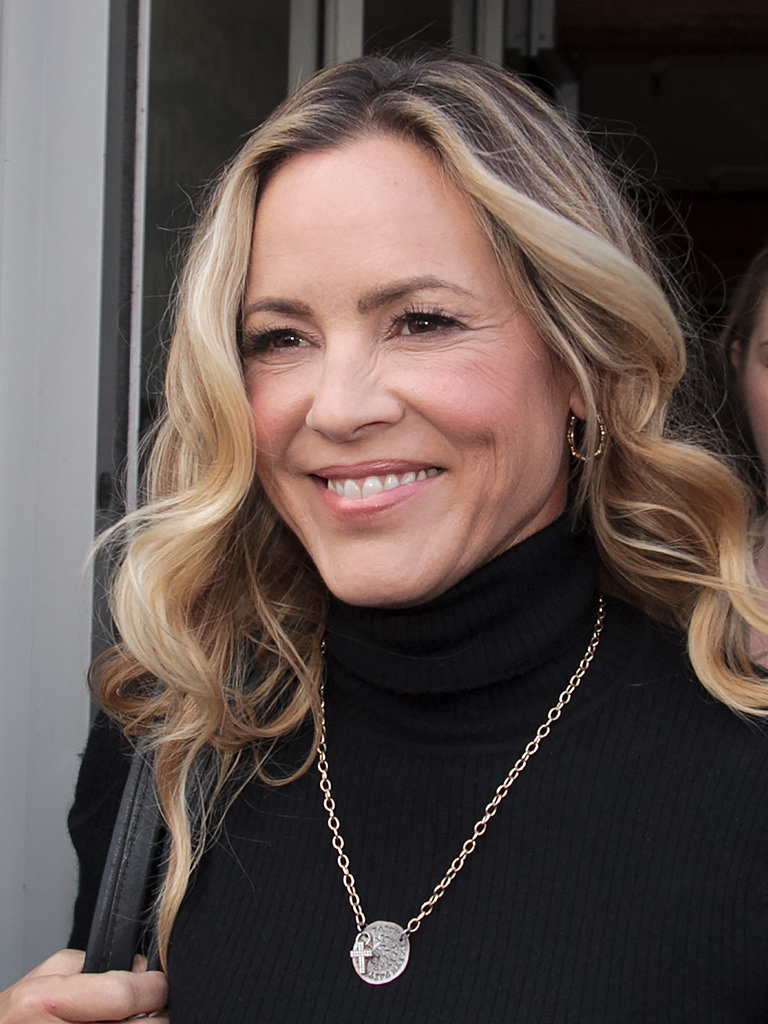
- Bello in 2016
- Born: April 18, 1967 (age 59); Norristown, Pennsylvania, U.S.
- Education: Villanova University
- Occupations: Actress; producer
- Years active: 1991–present
- Spouse: Dominique Crenn (m. 2024; sep. 2025)
- Children: 1

Maria Bello (born April 18, 1967) is an American actress. Her first major film role was in 1998's Permanent Midnight. She followed this with a range of supporting and leading parts in films such as Payback (1999), Coyote Ugly (2000), The Cooler (2003), Secret Window (2004), Assault on Precinct 13, A History of Violence, Thank You for Smoking (all 2005), Flicka, World Trade Center (both 2006), The Jane Austen Book Club (2007), The Mummy: Tomb of the Dragon Emperor (2008), Grown Ups (2010), Prisoners (2013), and Lights Out (2016).

Outside of film, Bello is best known for playing Anna Del Amico in the medical drama ER (1997–1998) and Jacqueline "Jack" Sloane in the police procedural drama NCIS (2017–2021). She received a Primetime Emmy Award nomination and won a Critics' Choice Award for her performance in the limited series Beef (2023). In 2009, The Guardian named her one of the best actors never to have received an Academy Award nomination.

== Early life ==
Bello was born April 18, 1967, in Norristown, Pennsylvania, to Kathy, a school nurse and teacher, and Joe Bello, a contractor. Her father is of Italian ancestry, with roots in Montella, Italy, and her mother is of Polish ancestry. She grew up in a working-class, Catholic family and graduated from Archbishop John Carroll High School in Radnor, Pennsylvania. She majored in political science at Villanova University. Following graduation, Bello honed her acting skills in a number of New York theater productions.

== Career ==
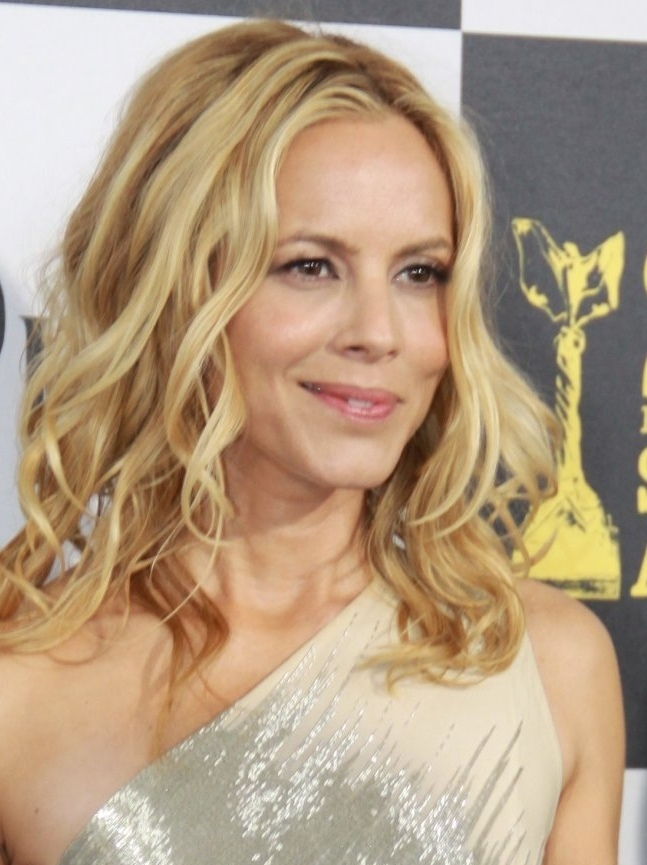
Bello at the Independent Spirit Awards in Los Angeles on March 5, 2010

Bello's early TV appearances include episodes of The Commish (1991), Due South (1994), Nowhere Man (1995), Misery Loves Company (1995), and ER (1997–98). Her breakthrough came when she was cast as Mrs. Smith in the TV series spy show Mr. & Mrs. Smith, though the show was cancelled after eight weeks. She then appeared in the final three episodes of the third season of ER as pediatrician Dr. Anna Del Amico and was a regular cast member during the medical drama's fourth season.

Bello moved on to films, landing a role in Coyote Ugly (2000). She was nominated for the Golden Globe award twice: for Best Supporting Actress in The Cooler (2003) and for Best Actress in A History of Violence (2005). She starred in The Jane Austen Book Club (2007) as Jocelyn and as Dr. Alex Sabian in the 2005 film, Assault on Precinct 13, a remake of the original 1976 movie made by John Carpenter. In 2008, she starred in The Mummy: Tomb of the Dragon Emperor as Evelyn O'Connell, replacing Rachel Weisz. In December 2008, Bello began developing a drama for HBO. Besides starring in the new series, Bello planned to also serve as an executive producer. She starred in the 2009 drama film The Yellow Handkerchief, which was released in theatres on February 26, 2010, by Samuel Goldwyn Films.

In 2010, Bello guest starred in two episodes of Law & Order: Special Victims Unit. The following year, she starred in the TV series Prime Suspect, which was cancelled after 13 episodes. In 2011, she became a founding board member of the CQ Matrix Company, a company created by her then-partner, Clare Munn, to help clients achieve "transformative living and the power of intelligent exchange" by enhancing their communication quotient. In 2014, she starred alongside Frank Grillo in the James Wan-produced thriller Demonic.

Bello began producing short films in 2010. In 2022, she was a producer on the film The Woman King.

== Personal life ==
Bello has a son, Jackson, with her former boyfriend Dan McDermott.

In November 2013, she wrote about having a same-sex relationship with her best friend, Clare Munn. Bello's book, Whatever...Love Is Love: Questioning the Labels We Give Ourselves, was published in 2015. Bello and Munn split the same year and the actress was rumoured to be dating Elijah Allan-Blitz.

Bello and chef Dominique Crenn became engaged on December 29, 2019, while holidaying in Paris. Court documents list their official wedding date as April 7, 2024. The wedding ceremony took place in Mexico on May 12, 2024. Bello filed for divorce in May 2025, citing irreconcilable differences.

=== Philanthropy ===
Bello has been involved in several advocacy and philanthropic causes. In the aftermath of the 2010 Haiti earthquake, Bello founded WE ADVANCE with Aleda Frishman, Barbara Guillaume, and Alison Thompson. It is an organization that encourages Haitian women to collaborate in making healthcare a priority, and putting an end to domestic violence within their communities. As of 2011, the organization is based in a health clinic and a community outreach center in Cité Soleil. Bello led fundraising efforts in Philadelphia and donated to the 2011 Tōhoku earthquake and tsunami in Japan. She is also a board member of Darfur Women Action Group, an NGO that undertakes activism on behalf of genocide victims of the Darfur conflict.

== Filmography ==
=== Film ===
Year	Title	Role	Notes
1992	Maintenance	Eddie	
1994	Morphosis	Boss	
1998	Permanent Midnight	Kitty	
1999	Payback	Rosie	
2000	Coyote Ugly	Lil Lovell	
2000	Duets	Suzi Loomis	
2001	China: The Panda Adventure	Ruth Harkness	
2001	Sam the Man	Anastasia Powell	
2002	Auto Focus	Patricia Olson / Patricia Crane / Sigrid Valdis	
2002	100 Mile Rule	Monica	
2003	The Cooler	Natalie Belisario	
2004	Silver City	Nora Allardyce	
2004	Secret Window	Amy Rainey	
2005	Assault on Precinct 13	Alex Sabian	
2005	A History of Violence	Edie Stall	
2005	The Dark	Adélle	
2006	Thank You for Smoking	Polly Bailey	
2006	The Sisters	Marcia Prior Glass	
2006	Flicka	Nell McLaughlin	
2006	World Trade Center	Donna McLoughlin	
2007	The Jane Austen Book Club	Jocelyn	
2007	Towelhead	Gail Monahan	
2007	Butterfly on a Wheel	Abby Randall	a.k.a. Shattered
2008	The Yellow Handkerchief	May	
2008	Downloading Nancy	Nancy Stockwell	
2008	The Mummy: Tomb of the Dragon Emperor	Evelyn O'Connell	Replaces Rachel Weisz
2009	The Private Lives of Pippa Lee	Suky	
2010	The Company Men	Sally Wilcox	
2010	Grown Ups	Sally Lamonsoff	
2011	Beautiful Boy	Kate Carroll	
2011	Abduction	Mara Harper	
2011	Carjacked	Lorraine	
2013	Grown Ups 2	Sally Lamonsoff	
2013	Prisoners	Grace Dover	
2013	Third Person	Theresa	
2015	McFarland, USA	Cheryl White	
2015	Demonic	Dr. Elizabeth Klein	
2015	Bravetown	Martha	
2016	The 5th Wave	Sergeant Reznik	
2016	The Confirmation	Bonnie	
2016	Lights Out	Sophie	
2016	The Late Bloomer	Brenda Newmans	
2016	Max Steel	Molly McGrath	
2016	Wait Till Helen Comes	Jean	a.k.a. Little Girl's Secret
2016	The Journey Is the Destination	Kathy Eldon	Also executive producer
2017	In Search of Fellini	Claire	Also executive producer
2018	Every Day	Lindsey	
2018	Better Start Running	Agent McFadden	
2018	Giant Little Ones	Carly Winter	Also executive producer
2020	The Water Man	Sheriff Goodwin	
2022	The Woman King	—N/a	Producer and story writer
TBA	Grown Ups 3	Sally Lamonsoff	Filming

=== Television ===
Year	Title	Role	Notes
1995	Misery Loves Company	Joe's Former Film Student	Episode: "That Book by Nabokov"
1995	Nowhere Man	Emily Noonan	Episode: "The Enemy Within"
1995	The Commish	Betsy	Episode: "In the Shadows of the Gallows"
1996	Due South	Mackenzie King	Episode: "One Good Man"
1996–1997	Mr. & Mrs. Smith	Mrs. Smith	13 episodes
1997–1998	ER	Dr. Anna Del Amico	Recurring role (season 3); main role (season 4)
2010	Law & Order: Special Victims Unit	Vivian Arliss	2 episodes
2011–2012	Prime Suspect	Jane Timoney	13 episodes
2012–2013	Touch	Lucy Robbins	13 episodes
2014	Big Driver	Tess Thorne	Television film
2016	Goliath	Michelle McBride	8 episodes
2017–2021	NCIS	Jacqueline "Jack" Sloane	Main role (season 15–18); 73 episodes
2017	XQ Super School Live	Herself	Television special
2023	Beef	Jordan Forster	Recurring role; 6 episodes
2025	The Waterfront	Belle Buckley	Main role; 8 episodes

== Awards and nominations ==
Year	Award	Category	Nominated work	Result
1997	Screen Actors Guild Award	Outstanding Performance by an Ensemble in a Drama Series	ER	Won
2000	Blockbuster Entertainment Awards	Favorite Supporting Actress – Comedy/Romance	Coyote Ugly	Won
2003	Golden Globe Award	Best Supporting Actress – Motion Picture	The Cooler	Nominated
2003	National Society of Film Critics Award	Best Supporting Actress	The Cooler	Nominated
2003	Online Film Critics Society Award	Best Supporting Actress	The Cooler	Nominated
2003	Screen Actors Guild Award	Outstanding Performance by a Female Actor in a Supporting Role	The Cooler	Nominated
2003	Satellite Award	Best Supporting Actress – Motion Picture	The Cooler	Won
2005	Broadcast Film Critics Association Award	Best Supporting Actress	A History of Violence	Nominated
2005	Central Ohio Film Critics Association Award	Best Supporting Performance	A History of Violence	Won
2005	Chicago Film Critics Association Award	Best Supporting Actress	A History of Violence	Won
2005	Golden Globe Award	Best Actress Motion Picture – Drama	A History of Violence	Nominated
2005	Kansas City Film Critics Circle Award	Best Supporting Actress	A History of Violence	Won
2005	London Film Critics Circle Awards	Actress of the Year	A History of Violence	Nominated
2005	New York Film Critics Circle Award	Best Supporting Actress	A History of Violence	Won
2005	Online Film Critics Society Award	Best Supporting Actress	A History of Violence	Won
2005	Satellite Award	Best Supporting Actress – Motion Picture	A History of Violence	Nominated
2005	Village Voice Film Poll Award	Best Supporting Performance	A History of Violence	Won
2006	RiverRun International Film Festival's Jury Prize	Best Actress	The Sisters	Won
2006	Dixie Film Festival Prize	Outstanding Actress in a Film	The Sisters	Nominated
2009	Independent Spirit Award	Best Female Lead	Downloading Nancy	Nominated
2013	National Board of Review Award	Best Cast	Prisoners	Won
2022	Women Film Critics Circle Award	Best Woman Storyteller	The Woman King	Nominated
2023	Black Reel Award	Outstanding Film	The Woman King	Won
2023	AACTA International Award	Best Screenplay	The Woman King	Nominated
2023	NAACP Image Award	Outstanding Writing in a Motion Picture	The Woman King	Nominated
2024	Primetime Emmy Award	Outstanding Supporting Actress in a Limited or Anthology Series or Movie	Beef	Nominated
2024	Critics' Choice Award	Best Supporting Actress in a Limited Series or Movie Made for Television	Beef	Won
