= Coyote Ugly Saloon =

U.S.-based bar chain

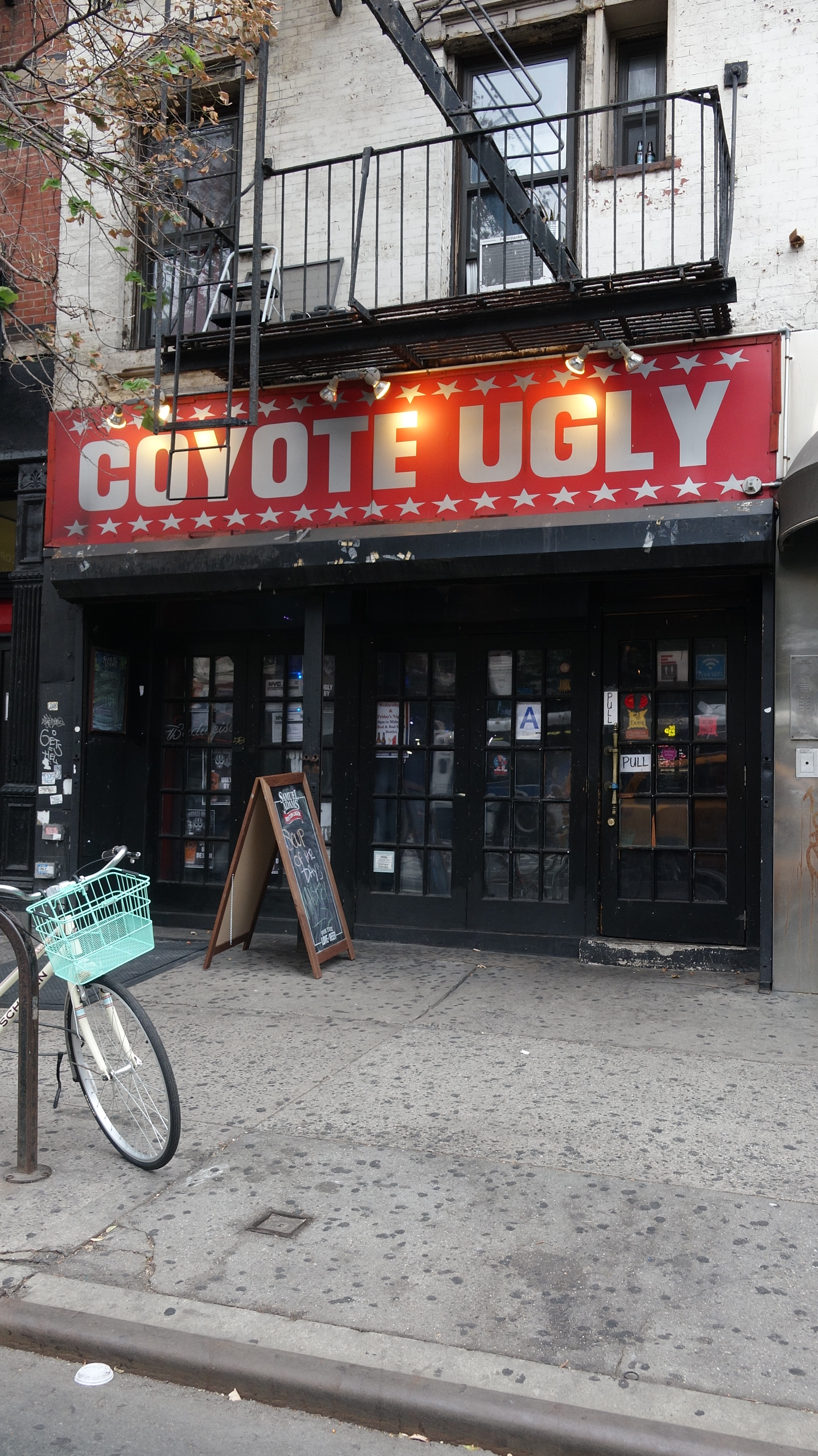
The original Coyote Ugly Saloon, in New York, 2016

The Coyote Ugly Saloon is an American drinking establishment and the namesake of an international chain of bars, whose bartenders dance on the bar. It served as the setting for the 2000 film Coyote Ugly.

== History ==
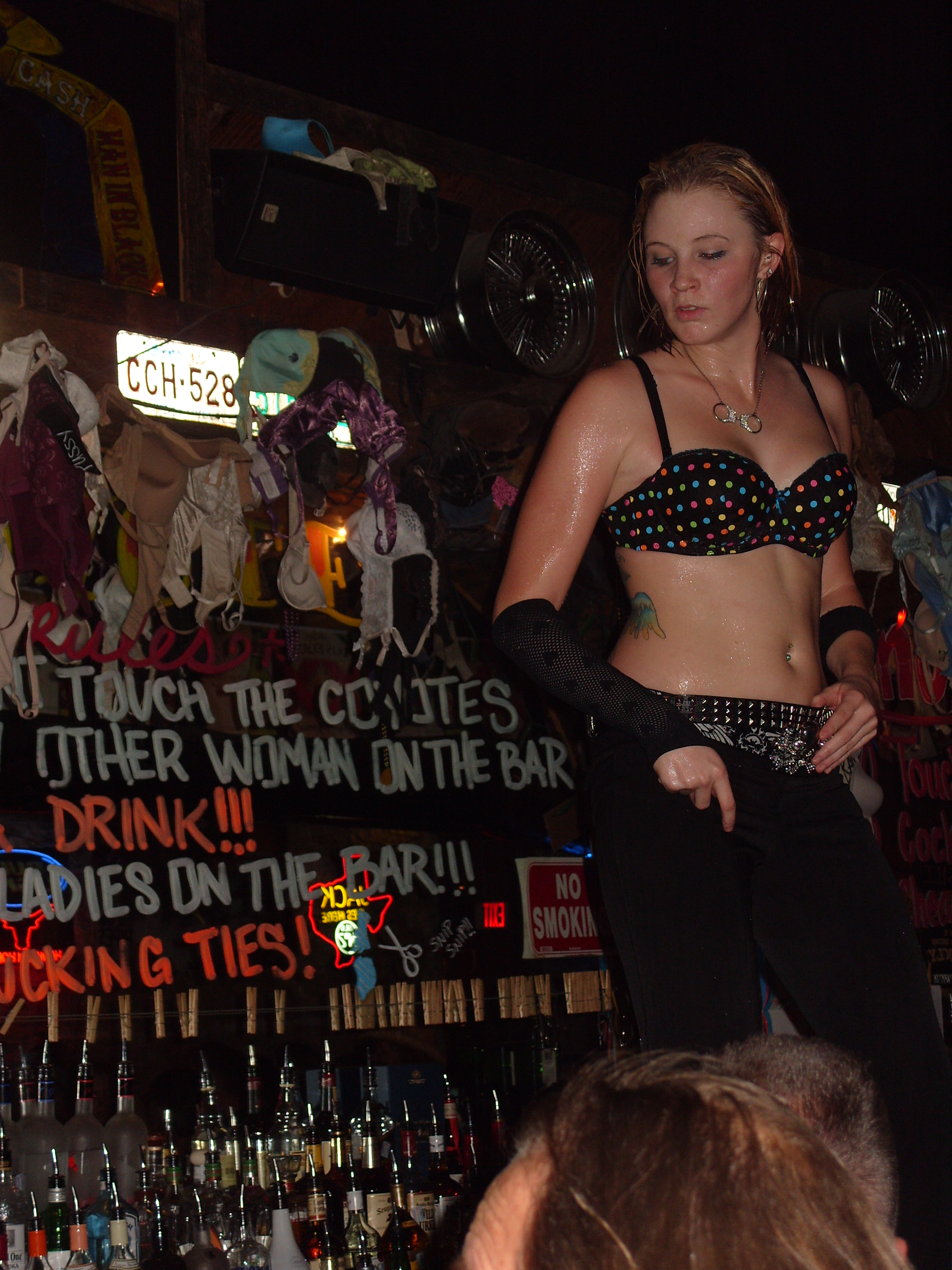
Coyote Ugly bartender in Texas dancing on the bar

The original Coyote Ugly Saloon opened on January 27, 1993, in New York City, after New York University graduate Liliana Lovell decided to forfeit an internship on Wall Street to work as a bartender.

In 2001, the second Coyote Ugly location opened, at the Las Vegas Strip's New York-New York Hotel and Casino, with management franchising the operation. In 2002, a new, company-owned bar opened in New Orleans' French Quarter. In 2003, Lovell relocated from New York City to New Orleans to run that bar and be involved in the day-to-day corporate operations.

In 2004, the company opened additional corporate-owned locations in San Antonio and Austin, Texas, as well as Nashville, Tennessee. A branch was opened in Denver, Colorado in 2005, and in Memphis, Tennessee in 2006. In June 2009, a branch was opened in Oklahoma City, Oklahoma. Since 2009, more franchised bars in Tampa, Panama City Beach, Destin and Daytona Beach have been established in Florida.

In 2009, Coyote Ugly began an international franchise program with a multi-unit licensing contract in Russia, opening their first internationally franchised bar in Moscow, with another in Koblenz, Germany. Following these openings, its Russian operations expanded to locations in St. Petersburg in 2010, followed by Kazan in 2011.

In 2016, branches were opened in Liverpool and Birmingham in the United Kingdom. Additional locations opened in the Welsh cities of Cardiff and Swansea. In August 2022 another bar was opened in Camden, London, and in 2024, one was opened in Bristol. In October 2025 they opened their first Scottish bar in Edinburgh.

== In popular culture ==
=== Movie based on the company ===
The bar reached national prominence in 1997 when former bartender Elizabeth Gilbert wrote of her experiences in an article for GQ magazine, titled "The Muse of the Coyote Ugly Saloon". Producer Jerry Bruckheimer's company bought the rights to the story from Lovell, and he produced the movie Coyote Ugly, based on the article. The film was shot on a set in Los Angeles, with exteriors filmed in Manhattan. Coyote Ugly opened in August 2000 with Maria Bello in the role of Lovell and Piper Perabo as an aspiring songwriter in New York City who becomes the newest "Coyote". It grossed more than US$110 million worldwide.

=== Other ===
From 2006 to 2008, CMT ran three seasons of The Ultimate Coyote Ugly Search produced by Touchstone Television. The first two seasons saw a group of prospective employees paired with a serving Coyote in the hope of getting a job at the bar and a cash sum for them and their partner. The final season changed the format with the contestants competing to get a place on the traveling Coyotes troupe – five Coyotes who could be booked to bar-tend and entertain at corporate, sports, and music events.
