= The Ultimate Coyote Ugly Search =

American reality television competition

The Ultimate Coyote Ugly Search is an American reality television competition broadcast by Country Music Television. The first two seasons saw a group of 'wannabes' paired with a serving Coyote in the hope of getting a job at the Coyote Ugly Saloon and a cash sum for them and their partner. The final season changed the format. In the final season, singing-dancing female bartenders competed for a position with the company's traveling troupe and a $50,000 prize.

== Season Three ==
Season three, which premiered March 7, 2008, featured 10 contestants. They are listed below in alphabetical order according to name, occupation, and hometown.

- Ashley Glasgow, Entrepreneur, Tampa, Florida
- Jessica Henry, Singer/Actress, Philadelphia
- Jocelyn Towle, Insurance Processor, Miami
- Kelly Bentley, Former National Guard member, Ashland, Alabama
- Lauren Lee, Bartender, Nashville, Tennessee
- Sarah LeClear, Dancer, Los Angeles
- Tanea Renee Singleton, Singer, New York City
- Taylin Rae, Singer, Oklahoma City, Oklahoma
- Tiffany Mallari, Dancer, San Francisco
- Tracy Hanna, nightclub Promoter, Ridgefield, New Jersey

== Previous seasons ==
In 2006, "The Ultimate Coyote Ugly Search" became a reality TV show on CMT. The premise of the show is that Lovell is auditioning girls to become the next "coyote". With the help from a few of her "coyote mentors", Lil trains girls to become bartenders, dancers, and all around entertainers, and one will prevail to become a regular coyote and win $25,000.

In 2007, the series reappeared on CMT. This time around, the series was based on teams. Lil chose five of her best Coyotes from bars across the country. Each of those coyotes would then hold auditions at their home bars to find teammates for the competition. The teams for the competition were:

2007 Search Teams
Home Bar	Coyote	Apprentice
New York	Maria	Regan
Fort Lauderdale	"Wiggins"	Amanda "Red"
Nashville	Sally	Molly "Ice"
Memphis	Bri	Sandra "Mexico"
Charlotte	Kat	Stephanie

The team that won this competition was Team New York, who was rewarded $50,000.
