= David McNally (director) =

British-Canadian director

- Born: 1960 (age 64–65); Liverpool, England, United Kingdom
- Occupation(s): Director, producer and writer
- Years active: 1990s–present

David McNally (born 1960 in Liverpool, England) is a British-Canadian director of film and television. He is best known for directing the films Coyote Ugly (2000) and Kangaroo Jack (2003).

McNally was born in England, grew up in Montreal, Quebec, and moved to Los Angeles.

== Career ==
McNally began his career as a director of music videos and commercials. His most famous commercial was the Budweiser commercial with a lobster that aired during Super Bowl XXXIII. It was voted the most popular Super Bowl commercial of 1999 by numerous fans and publications.

In 2000, he made his directorial debut directing the film Coyote Ugly (2000), followed by Kangaroo Jack in 2003. In 2006, he co-created the short-lived drama Justice, serving as writer and executive producer.
