= Coyote Ugly =

2000 film by David McNally

- Theatrical release poster
- Directed by: David McNally
- Written by: Gina Wendkos; Kevin Smith (uncredited, additional material)
- Based on: "The Muse of the Coyote Ugly Saloon" by Elizabeth Gilbert
- Produced by: Jerry Bruckheimer; Chad Oman
- Starring: Piper Perabo; Adam Garcia; Maria Bello; Melanie Lynskey; John Goodman
- Cinematography: Amir Mokri
- Edited by: William Goldenberg
- Music by: Trevor Horn
- Production companies: Touchstone Pictures; Jerry Bruckheimer Films
- Distributed by: Buena Vista Pictures Distribution
- Release date: August 4, 2000 (United States)
- Running time: 101 minutes
- Country: United States
- Language: English
- Budget: $45 million
- Box office: $113.9 million

Coyote Ugly is a 2000 American comedy-drama film based on the Coyote Ugly Saloon. It was directed by David McNally, produced by Jerry Bruckheimer and Chad Oman, and written by Gina Wendkos with additional material by an uncredited Kevin Smith, based on "The Muse of the Coyote Ugly Saloon" by Elizabeth Gilbert. Set at the titular drinking establishment in New York City, the film stars Piper Perabo in her breakthrough role, Adam Garcia, Maria Bello, Melanie Lynskey, and John Goodman.

The film received mostly negative reviews but was a box office success nonetheless, grossing $113 million worldwide. The film has become a cult classic over the years. In 2020, Tyra Banks said that she had been lobbying the original production team for a sequel for years.

== Plot ==
Violet Sanford leaves her hometown of South Amboy, New Jersey, her father Bill, and her best friend Gloria, to pursue her dreams of becoming a songwriter in New York City. Violet unsuccessfully tries multiple times to get her demo tape noticed by recording studios. When she tries to attract the attention of a music industry scout, a bartender convinces her Kevin O'Donnell is the bar manager and Violet is hurt by the joke. Despondent after her apartment is burglarized, she notices three girls at an all-night diner flaunting hundreds of dollars and learns they work at a trendy bar named Coyote Ugly.

Violet convinces the bar owner Lil to audition her but while it doesn't go well, Violet earns a second audition by breaking up a fight between customers and goes shopping with Cammie for better apparel. Violet douses the fire marshal in water during the second audition. Lil is fined $250 but offers Violet a job if she can make up the $250 in one night. Violet auctions Kevin off to a woman at the bar to earn the money and Kevin tells Violet that she owes him. Violet agrees to four dates as payment and the two begin a relationship. Violet's performance of Blondie's "One Way or Another" during a chaotic night at the bar convinces Lil to make her a coyote. Kevin helps Violet overcome the stage fright she inherited from her now-deceased mother who had also moved to New York to pursue dreams of singing.

Bill, Violet's father, sees a photo of Violet in the newspaper and investigates, finding her dancing on the bar with other bartenders pouring pitchers of water over her. He refuses to talk to her when she calls him shortly after. Tensions grow when Lil refuses to let Violet leave for a singing gig Kevin arranged, costing Kevin a rare collectible to a bookie. When Kevin confronts a customer harassing Violet at the bar, Violet breaks up with him, and Lil fires her. Violet returns to New Jersey for Gloria's wedding and Bill is seriously injured when he is hit by a car while operating at a toll booth. Violet considers returning to South Amboy but Bill convinces her not to give up on her dreams and admits her mother never had stage fright; she quit singing because of Bill.

Violet goes to work in a New York restaurant and Lil visits to offer her old job back. Violet finishes a new song and a chance to sing at the Bowery Ballroom. She overcomes her cold feet and performs her song at open mic night with Kevin's help with the Coyotes, Bill, and Gloria in the audience for moral support. The performance leads to a deal with a record label.

Three months later at Coyote Ugly, LeAnn Rimes has recorded Violet's song and sings it on the bar as Violet joins in. After buying back the comic book Kevin lost to the bookie, and allowing Bill to win an auction, Violet kisses Kevin in celebration of the realization of all her dreams.

== Cast ==
- Piper Perabo as Violet Sanford, an aspiring songwriter
- Adam Garcia as Kevin O'Donnell, an Australian man who becomes Violet's love interest
- Maria Bello as Lil, the proprietor of Coyote Ugly
- Melanie Lynskey as Gloria, Violet's best friend from Jersey
- John Goodman as William James "Bill" Sanford, the father of Violet
- Izabella Miko as Cammie, an employee at Coyote Ugly
- Tyra Banks as Zoe, an employee at Coyote Ugly who was set to leave
- Bridget Moynahan as Rachel, an employee at Coyote Ugly
- Del Pentecost as Lou, the security guard at Coyote Ugly
- Michael Weston as Danny
- LeAnn Rimes as herself and singing voice of Violet Sanford (uncredited)
- John Fugelsang as Richie, the Booker
- Bud Cort as Romero
- Michael Bay as Photographer
- Melody Perkins as New Coyote (uncredited)

The bands The Calling and Unwritten Law cameo as performers at the Bowery Ballroom, and Chalk Farm plays as the backing band for Violet's performance.

== Production ==
=== Writing ===
Kevin Smith, who did an uncredited rewrite of the script, stated that a total of eight writers worked on the script, while the Writers Guild of America only gave credit to Gina Wendkos, who wrote the first draft of the script, which, according to Smith, scarcely resembles the final film. (See WGA screenwriting credit system.) Jeff Nathanson wrote a draft that director David McNally credits as the draft that "brought the thing home"; Nathanson was credited on the initial theatrical poster but not in the finished film. Carrie Fisher also wrote a draft.

=== Casting ===
Singers Jessica Simpson and Jewel were considered for the lead role of Violet Sanford. January Jones also auditioned for a role. On July 16, 1999, Piper Perabo was announced to have been given the role after a several-months-long casting process.

=== Filming ===
Production began in August 1999, first filmed in Manhattan and small towns in New Jersey including South Amboy and Sea Bright for a month. They then moved to California and shooting took place in Los Angeles, West Hollywood, Pasadena, and San Pedro.

=== Title ===
The film was based on an article, "The Muse of the Coyote Ugly Saloon", in GQ by Elizabeth Gilbert, who worked as a bartender in the East Village, Manhattan. The bar opened in 1993, and quickly became a Lower East Side favorite.

As explained in the film, the slang term "coyote ugly" refers to the feeling of waking up after a one-night stand, and discovering that one's arm is underneath someone who is so physically repulsive that one would gladly chew it off without waking the person just so one can get away without being discovered. Coyotes are known to gnaw off limbs if they are stuck in a trap, to facilitate escape.

== Reception ==
=== Box office ===
Coyote Ugly opened fourth at the North American box office making US$17,319,282 in its opening weekend, ranking below Hollow Man, Nutty Professor II: The Klumps and Space Cowboys. It went on to gross $60,786,269 domestically and $53,130,205 around the world to a total of $113,916,474 worldwide, becoming a box office success.

=== Critical response ===
The film received negative reviews from critics. Criticisms and praise centered around the belief that it was little more than an excuse to portray "hot, sexy women dancing on a bar in a wet T-shirt contest". On Rotten Tomatoes it has an approval rating of 23% based on 104 reviews, with an average rating of 3.8/10. The site's consensus states: "Coyote Ugly has an enthusiastically trashy energy and undeniable aesthetic appeal, but it's nowhere near enough to make up for the film's shallow, unimaginative story." On Metacritic it has a weighted average score of 27 out of 100, based on reviews from 29 critics, indicating "generally unfavorable" reviews. Audiences surveyed by CinemaScore gave the film a grade "A−" on scale of A to F.

Roger Ebert of the Chicago Sun-Times asked "Do you get the feeling these movies are assembled from off-the-shelf parts?" and although he does not ask for originality, he criticizes the complete lack of surprises. Ebert praises the technical merits of the film "But you can pump up the volume only so far before it becomes noise." Ebert called Perabo the "reason to see the movie" saying "She has one of those friendly Julia Roberts smiles, good comic timing, ease and confidence on the screen, and a career ahead of her in movies better than this one. Lots better." Peter Travers of Rolling Stone dismissed the film "Bruckheimer claims he's made a film about female empowerment, but it's soft-core pap for horny boys and their hornier dads." Robert Koehler of Variety called it "The latest and most calculated re-do on the formulaic fantasy of an innocent conquering Gotham."

VH1 made a statement about Rimes' appearance in the film stating, "Rimes [herself], who is only 17 years old, was sporting leather pants and a skimpy top and in all likelihood, even with a fake ID, would never have been allowed inside any NYC bar."

Years after its original release, the film has found success as a cult film and example of early-2000s fashion and culture. Justin Kirkland of Esquire praised the film for "capturing the hilariously sincere optimism of the Year 2000", saying "Coyote Ugly is a categorically bad film, but in its 101 minute run, it manages to capture the vibe of an iconic year that was plucky and unassuming with a delusional and misplaced sense of hope."

=== Home media ===
In summer 2005, an unrated special edition (the original release was rated PG-13 and the director's cut rated R) was released on DVD. It was also released in the UK and rated 15 by the BBFC. (By contrast, the theatrical cut was rated 12 in the UK.)

The extended cut adds approximately six minutes to the film's runtime, most of which consists of additional shots of the "coyotes" dancing on the bar and of Violet and Cammie trying on different outfits while shopping. Arguably, the most notable additions are the extension of the sex scene between Violet and Kevin (Perabo used a body double for most of the scene), and the inclusion of an additional scene which shows the "Coyotes" winning a softball game because Cammie distracts the pitcher by stripping.

The special features of the extended cut DVD are identical with those of the previous DVD release.

== Soundtracks ==
The film's soundtrack was released on August 1, 2000. It features Violet's four songs from the film, performed by LeAnn Rimes and written by Diane Warren. The tracks performed by Rimes were produced by Trevor Horn with string arrangements by David Campbell. In the United States, it was certified Gold within one month of its release and Platinum on November 7, 2000. On July 22, 2008, the soundtrack was certified 4× Platinum. Internationally, it was certified 5× Platinum in Canada and Gold (100,000 units) in Japan in 2002.

Three singles were released from the soundtrack, all by LeAnn Rimes: "Can't Fight the Moonlight" which achieved gold status and peaked at No. 11 on The Billboard Hot 100, "But I Do Love You", and "The Right Kind of Wrong".

A second soundtrack, More Music from Coyote Ugly, with more songs that appeared in the film and remixes of two of Rimes' songs, followed on January 28, 2003.

Although Perabo was able to sing for her character, it was decided that Rimes, owing to her soprano-type voice, would provide Violet's singing voice far better for the role. This means that during Rimes' cameo, she is effectively duetting with herself.

== Musical adaptation ==
A stage adaptation by Gina Wendkos and Vikki Stone has been announced in December 2025 and is set to open in London's West End in 2027.
