= LeAnn Rimes discography =

Cataloging of published recordings by LeAnn Rimes

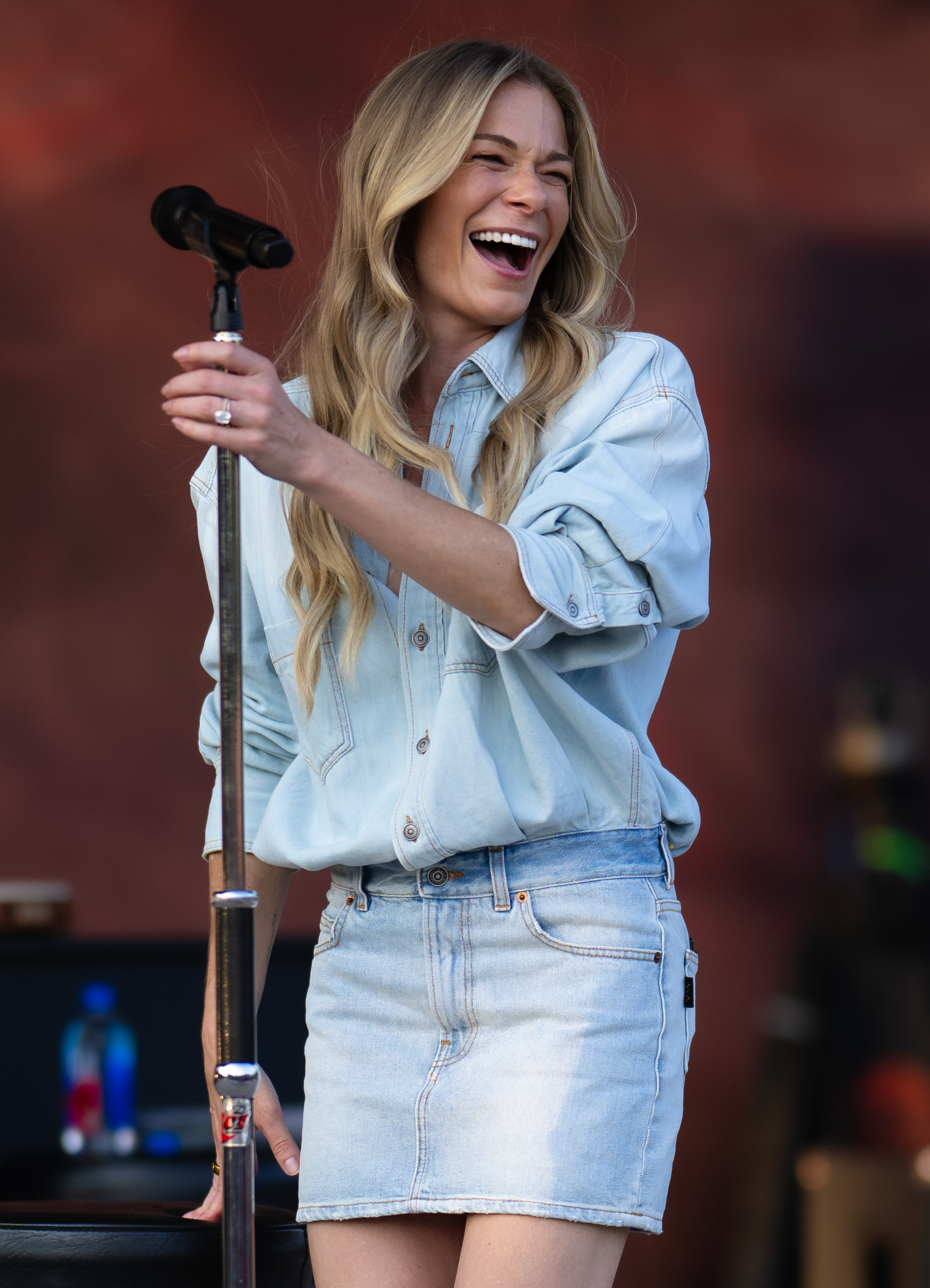
- LeAnn Rimes performing in July 2024
- Studio albums: 17
- Extended plays: 3
- Soundtrack albums: 1
- Live albums: 1
- Compilation albums: 8
- Singles: 60
- Christmas singles: 9
- Promotional singles: 16
- Album appearances: 22

American recording artist LeAnn Rimes has released 17 studio albums, nine compilation albums, one live album, one soundtrack album, three extended plays, 60 singles, nine Christmas singles and 16 promotional singles. Rimes has sold over 48 million records worldwide as of April 2025, with 16.5 million albums and 5.5 million singles certified by the Recording Industry Association of America (RIAA). Rimes was ranked the 17th best-selling music artist of the 1990s by Billboard. She was also the 31st most successful country artist of the 2000s.

She began recording at age 11 and released two studio albums and one EP on independent Nor Va Jak label. In 1995, she was signed to Curb Records in Nashville, Tennessee. In 1996, her debut single titled "Blue" was released and peaked at number ten on the Billboard Hot Country Songs chart while topping the Canadian RPM Country Tracks list. Her major label debut and third studio album of the same name was issued on Curb the same year and sold over ten million copies worldwide. Other singles spawned from the album were "The Light in Your Eyes" and the number one country song "One Way Ticket (Because I Can)". Curb followed the release with a reissue of her independently released album All That (1994) titled Unchained Melody: The Early Years; the album was her first to reach number one on the Billboard 200 album chart.

In 1997, Rimes crossed over into pop music with the single "How Do I Live". It reached number two on the Billboard Hot 100 and was also a hit internationally. It was included on her next studio release You Light Up My Life: Inspirational Songs. The album reached number one on the Billboard 200 and the Canadian RPM albums chart. In 1998, Rimes released Sittin' on Top of the World, which featured the top ten country singles "Commitment" and "Nothin' New Under the Moon". In 1999, she released her self-titled album, which featured the top ten Country hit "Big Deal". In 2001, Curb Records released the compilation I Need You, which featured the international crossover hit "Can't Fight the Moonlight" and the title track.

In 2002, Rimes released Twisted Angel, and followed it with Greatest Hits the next year. Rimes released her first Christmas studio record in 2004 titled What a Wonderful World. In 2005, she issued the country project This Woman, which debuted at number two on the country albums chart and spawned three top ten country songs. It was followed by the international studio release Whatever We Wanna (2006) and the country album Family (2007), the latter of which reached the top five on the United States album charts. Rimes released two more studio albums on Curb before moving to RCA Records in 2016 to release the album Remnants, which peaked at number 15 in the United Kingdom and at 88 in the United States.

== Albums ==
=== Studio albums ===
List of studio albums, with selected chart positions and certifications, showing other relevant details
Title	Album details	Peak chart positions										Certifications
Title	Album details	US	US Cou.	AUS	AUT	CAN	CAN Cou.	GER	NED	NZ	UK	Certifications
Everybody's Sweetheart	Released: June 14, 1991; Label: Nor Va Jak; Formats: CD	—	—	—	—	—	—	—	—	—	—	
All That	Released: July 22, 1994; Label: Nor Va Jak; Formats: CD, cassette	—	—	—	—	—	—	—	—	—	—	
Blue	Released: July 9, 1996; Label: Curb; Formats: CD, cassette	3	1	5	—	20	1	—	—	10	99	RIAA: 6× Platinum; ARIA: 2× Platinum; MC: 3× Platinum; RMNZ: Gold
You Light Up My Life: Inspirational Songs	Released: September 9, 1997; Label: Curb; Formats: CD, cassette	1	1	12	—	13	1	—	—	41	170	RIAA: 4× Platinum; ARIA: Platinum; MC: 2× Platinum
Sittin' on Top of the World	Released: May 5, 1998; Label: Curb; Formats: CD, cassette	3	2	42	28	15	2	42	27	—	11	RIAA: Platinum; ARIA: Gold; BPI: Gold; MC: Platinum
LeAnn Rimes	Released: October 26, 1999; Label: Curb; Formats: CD, cassette	8	1	74	—	18	2	—	—	—	119	RIAA: Platinum; MC: Platinum
Twisted Angel	Released: October 1, 2002; Label: Curb; Formats: CD, cassette	12	3	21	64	—	—	33	39	5	14	RIAA: Gold; ARIA: Gold; BPI: Silver; MC: Gold; RMNZ: Gold
What a Wonderful World	Released: October 12, 2004; Label: Asylum-Curb; Formats: CD	81	13	—	—	—	—	—	—	—	—	
This Woman	Released: January 25, 2005; Label: Asylum-Curb; Formats: CD, music download	3	2	90	—	—	—	—	—	—	—	RIAA: Gold
Whatever We Wanna	Released: June 6, 2006; Label: Asylum-Curb; Formats: CD, music download	—	—	—	61	—	—	65	—	—	15	
Family	Released: October 9, 2007; Label: Asylum-Curb; Formats: CD, music download	4	2	—	—	—	—	—	—	—	31	
Lady & Gentlemen	Released: September 27, 2011; Label: Curb; Formats: CD, music download	32	7	—	—	—	—	—	—	—	96	
Spitfire	Released: April 15, 2013; Label: Asylum-Curb; Formats: CD, music download	36	9	—	—	—	—	—	—	—	142	
Today Is Christmas	Released: October 16, 2015; Label: Kobalt; Formats: CD, music download	88	9	—	—	—	—	—	—	—	—	
Remnants	Released: October 28, 2016; Label: RCA; Formats: CD, music download	88	—	—	—	—	—	—	—	—	15	
Chant: The Human & the Holy	Released: November 20, 2020; Label: EverLe/Thirty Tigers; Formats: Music download	—	—	—	—	—	—	—	—	—	—	
God's Work	Released: September 16, 2022; Label: EverLe/Thirty Tigers; Formats: CD, LP, music download	—	—	—	—	—	—	—	—	—	— (Note: "God's Work" did not enter the UK Albums Chart, but peaked on a number of separate charts, including at number 25 on the UK Independent Albums Chart, number 5 on the Christian & Gospel Albums Chart, and at number 43 on the UK Albums Downloads Chart.)	
"—" denotes a recording that did not chart or was not released in that territory.

=== Reissues ===
List of reissues, with selected chart positions and certifications, showing other relevant details
Title	Album details	Peak chart positions						Certifications
Title	Album details	US	US Cou.	AUS	CAN	CAN Cou.	UK	Certifications
Unchained Melody: The Early Years	Released: February 11, 1997; Label: Curb; Formats: CD, cassette	1	1	4	19	1	9	RIAA: 2× Platinum; ARIA: Gold; MC: Platinum

=== Compilation albums ===
List of compilation albums, with selected chart positions and certifications, showing other relevant details
Title	Album details	Peak chart positions									Certifications
Title	Album details	US	US Cou.	AUS	AUT	CAN	GER	NED	NZ	UK	Certifications
I Need You	Released: January 30, 2001; Label: Curb; Formats: CD, cassette	10	1	29	11	10	14	67	12	7	RIAA: Platinum; BPI: Gold; MC: Platinum
God Bless America	Released: October 16, 2001; Label: Curb; Formats: CD, cassette	159	20	—	—	—	—	—	—	—	
Greatest Hits	Released: November 18, 2003; Label: Asylum-Curb; Formats: CD	24	3	30	—	—	—	—	19	—	RIAA: Platinum; ARIA: Gold; RMNZ: Gold
The Best of LeAnn Rimes	Released: February 3, 2004; Label: Asylum-Curb; Formats: CD	—	—	141	11	—	8	—	—	2	BPI: Platinum
The Best of LeAnn Rimes Remixed	Released: June 21, 2004; Label: Curb/London; Formats: CD	—	—	—	—	—	—	—	—	—	
Dance Like You Don't Give a.... Greatest Hits Remixes	Released: August 5, 2014; Label: Curb; Formats: CD, music download	—	50	—	—	—	—	—	—	—	
All-Time Greatest Hits	Released: February 3, 2015; Label: Curb; Formats: CD, music download	—	30	—	—	—	—	—	—	—	
The Biggest Hits of LeAnn Rimes	Released: June 15, 2018; Label: Curb; Formats: CD	—	—	—	—	—	—	—	—	—	
Greatest Hits Christmas	Released: November 7, 2025; Formats: CD, LP	—	—	—	—	—	—	—	—	—	
"—" denotes a recording that did not chart or was not released in that territory.

=== Live albums ===
List of albums, showing relevant details
Title	Details
Rimes: Live at Gruene Hall	Released: April 13, 2019; Label: EverLe/Thirty Tigers; Formats: LP, music download

=== Soundtrack albums ===
List of soundtracks, with selected chart positions, showing other relevant details
Title	Album details	Peak chart positions	
Title	Album details	US Hol.	US Indep.
It's Christmas, Eve	Released: October 12, 2018; Label: EverLe/Thirty Tigers; Formats: CD, music download	12	5

== Extended plays ==
List of EP's, with selected chart positions, showing other relevant details
Title	EP details	Peak chart positions		
Title	EP details	US	US Cou.	US Hol.
From My Heart to Yours	Released: 1992; Label: Nor Va Jak; Formats: CD, cassette	—	—	—
One Christmas: Chapter 1	Released: October 27, 2014; Label: Iconic; Formats: CD, music download	172	20	35
Re-Imagined	Released: June 20, 2018; Label: EverLe/Thirty Tigers; Formats: Music download	—	—	—
"—" denotes a recording that did not chart or was not released in that territory.

== Singles ==
=== As lead artist ===
List of singles, with selected chart positions and certifications, showing other relevant details
Title	Year	Peak chart positions										Certifications	Album
Title	Year	US	US Cou.	US Dance	AUS	CAN	CAN Cou.	GER	IRE	NED	UK	Certifications	Album
"Blue"	1996	26	10	—	10	—	1	—	—	—	23	RIAA: Platinum; ARIA: Gold	Blue
"Hurt Me"	1996	—	43	—	89	—	35	—	—	—	—		Blue
"One Way Ticket (Because I Can)"	1996	—	1	—	—	—	4	—	—	—	—		Blue
"Unchained Melody"	1996	—	3	—	—	—	3	—	—	—	—		Unchained Melody: The Early Years
"The Light in Your Eyes"	1997	—	5	—	—	—	13	—	—	—	—		Blue
"How Do I Live"	1997	2	43	— (Note: "How Do I Live" did not enter the Billboard Dance Club Songs chart, but peaked at number 1 the Dance Singles Sales chart.)	17	19	82	22	14	5	7	RIAA: 4× Platinum; BPI: 2× Platinum; RMNZ: Platinum	You Light Up My Life: Inspirational Songs
"You Light Up My Life"	1997	34	48	—	—	—	57	—	—	—	—	RIAA: Gold	You Light Up My Life: Inspirational Songs
"On the Side of Angels"	1998	—	4	—	—	—	9	—	—	—	—		You Light Up My Life: Inspirational Songs
"Commitment"	1998	—	4	—	59	—	4	—	—	—	38 (Note: In most territories, "Looking Through Your Eyes" and "Commitment" were released as a double A-side. In the UK, both songs charted as the same release. In the United States, both songs were certified as the same release.)	RIAA: Gold	Sittin' on Top of the World
"Looking Through Your Eyes"	1998	18	—	—	—	—	—	—	—	—	38	RIAA: Gold	Sittin' on Top of the World and Quest for Camelot: Music from the Motion Picture
"Nothin' New Under the Moon"	1998	—	10	—	—	—	5	—	—	—	—		Sittin' on Top of the World
"Feels Like Home"	1998	— (Note: "Feels Like Home" did not enter the Billboard Hot 100, but peaked at number 17 on the Billboard Adult Contemporary chart.)	—	—	—	—	—	—	—	—	—		Sittin' on Top of the World
"These Arms of Mine"	1998	—	41	—	—	—	52	—	—	—	—		Sittin' on Top of the World
"Big Deal"	1999	23	6	—	—	—	3	—	—	—	—		LeAnn Rimes
"Crazy"	1999	—	—	—	—	—	—	—	—	—	36		LeAnn Rimes
"I Need You" (Note: "I Need You" was initially released in the United States as a single from the Jesus soundtrack on July 18, 2000, and was subsequently released internationally as a single from I Need You on March 19, 2001.)	2000	11	8	—	51	18	16	63	19	81	13	RIAA: Gold	Jesus: Music from and Inspired by the Epic Mini-Series and I Need You
"Can't Fight the Moonlight" (Note: "Can't Fight the Moonlight" debuted on the Hot 100 in September 2000 and peaked at number 71. It was re-issued and debuted again in December 2001, and that time peaked at number 11.)	2000	11	61	17	1	6	—	8	1	1	1	RIAA: Platinum; ARIA: 3× Platinum; BPI: 2× Platinum; RMNZ: Platinum	Coyote Ugly: Soundtrack
"But I Do Love You"	2001	— (Note: "But I Do Love You" did not enter the Billboard Hot 100, but peaked at number 3 on the Bubbling Under Hot 100 Singles extension chart.)	18	—	—	—	—	48	—	—	20		Coyote Ugly: Soundtrack and I Need You
"Soon"	2001	— (Note: "Soon" did not enter the Billboard Hot 100, but peaked at number 14 on the Billboard Adult Contemporary chart.)	—	—	—	—	—	—	—	—	—		I Need You
"God Bless America"	2001	—	51	—	—	—	—	—	—	—	—		God Bless America
"Life Goes On"	2002	— (Note: "Life Goes On" did not enter the Billboard Hot 100, but peaked at number 10 on the Bubbling Under Hot 100 Singles extension chart.)	60	—	7	24	—	39	27	7	11	ARIA: Platinum	Twisted Angel
"Tic Toc"	2002	—	—	10	—	—	—	—	—	—	—		Twisted Angel
"Suddenly"	2003	—	43	—	53	—	—	90	—	93	47		Twisted Angel
"We Can"	2003	—	—	19	51	—	—	—	37	94	27		Legally Blonde 2: Red, White & Blonde - Motion Picture Soundtrack
"This Love"	2004	—	37	—	—	—	—	—	26	—	54		Greatest Hits
"Nothin' 'bout Love Makes Sense"	2004	52	5	—	—	—	1	—	—	—	—		This Woman
"Probably Wouldn't Be This Way"	2005	54	3	—	—	—	19	—	—	—	—		This Woman
"Something's Gotta Give"	2005	51	2	—	—	—	2	—	—	—	—		This Woman
"And It Feels Like"	2006	—	—	—	—	—	—	—	24	—	22		Whatever We Wanna
"Strong"	2006	—	—	—	—	—	—	—	—	—	—		Whatever We Wanna
"Everybody's Someone" (with Brian McFadden)	2006	—	—	—	—	—	—	—	27	—	48		Whatever We Wanna
"Some People"	2006	—	34	—	—	—	—	—	—	—	—		This Woman
"Nothin' Better to Do"	2007	73	14	8	—	—	25	—	—	—	48		Family
"Good Friend and a Glass of Wine"	2008	—	35	—	—	—	—	—	—	—	—		Family
"What I Cannot Change"	2008	—	—	1	—	—	—	—	—	—	—		Family
"Swingin'"	2010	—	57	—	—	—	—	—	—	—	—		Lady & Gentlemen
"Crazy Women"	2010	—	40	—	—	—	—	—	—	—	—		Lady & Gentlemen
"Give"	2011	—	47	11	—	—	—	—	—	—	—		Lady & Gentlemen
"What Have I Done"	2012	—	—	—	—	—	—	—	—	—	—		Spitfire
"Borrowed"	2012	—	—	—	—	—	—	—	—	—	—		Spitfire
"Spitfire"	2013	—	—	25	—	—	—	—	—	—	—		Spitfire
"Gasoline and Matches" (featuring Rob Thomas and Jeff Beck)	2014	—	—	—	—	—	—	—	—	—	—		Spitfire
"The Story"	2016	—	—	—	—	—	—	—	—	—	— (Note: "The Story" did not enter the UK Singles Chart, but peaked at number 74 on the UK Singles Downloads Chart.)		Remnants
"How to Kiss a Boy"	2016	—	—	—	—	—	—	—	—	—	—		Remnants
"Long Live Love"	2017	—	—	1	—	—	—	—	—	—	—		Remnants
"Love Is Love Is Love"	2017	—	—	1	—	—	—	—	—	—	—		Remnants
"Love Line"	2017	—	—	5	—	—	—	—	—	—	—		Remnants
"How Do I Live (Re-Imagined)"	2018	—	—	7	—	—	—	—	—	—	—		Re-Imagined
"Throw My Arms Around the World"	2020	—	—	—	—	—	—	—	—	—	—		God's Work
"How Much a Heart Can Hold"	2022	—	—	—	—	—	—	—	—	—	—		God's Work
"Spaceship"	2023	—	—	—	—	—	—	—	—	—	— (Note: "Spaceship" did not enter the UK Singles Chart, but peaked at number 65 on the UK Singles Downloads Chart.)		God's Work
"Innocent"	2023	—	—	—	—	—	—	—	—	—	—		God's Work
"—" denotes a recording that did not chart or was not released in that territory.

=== As a featured artist ===
List of singles, with selected chart positions and certifications, showing other relevant details
Title	Year	Peak chart positions										Certifications	Album
Title	Year	US	US Cou.	AUS	AUT	CAN	CAN Cou.	GER	IRE	NED	UK	Certifications	Album
"Written in the Stars" (Elton John with LeAnn Rimes)	1999	29	—	85	28	4	74	79	—	95	10	RIAA: Gold	Elton John and Tim Rice's Aida
"Cattle Call" (Eddy Arnold with LeAnn Rimes)	1999	—	— (Note: "Cattle Call" did not enter the Billboard Hot Country songs chart, but peaked at number 18 on the Top Country Singles Sales chart.)	—	—	—	—	—	—	—	—		Seven Decades of Hits
"Last Thing on My Mind" (Ronan Keating and LeAnn Rimes)	2004	—	—	—	33	—	—	50	10	86	5		Turn It On
"Till We Ain't Strangers Anymore" (Bon Jovi with LeAnn Rimes)	2007	— (Note: "Till We Ain't Strangers Anymore" did not enter the Billboard Hot 100, but peaked at number 23 on the Bubbling Under Hot 100 Singles chart.)	47	—	—	—	—	39	—	—	—		Lost Highway
"In Front of the Alamo" (Hal Ketchum with LeAnn Rimes)	2007	—	—	—	—	—	—	—	—	—	—		One More Midnight
"Just Stand Up!" (as Artists Stand Up to Cancer)	2008	11	—	39	73	10	—	11	—	19	26		—N/a
"When It's Good" (Marc Broussard with LeAnn Rimes)	2009	—	—	—	—	—	—	—	—	—	—		Keep Coming Back
"The Choice" (as Souls4Souls)	2012	—	—	—	—	—	—	—	—	—	—		—N/a
"Snow in Vegas" (David Gray with LeAnn Rimes)	2015	—	—	—	—	—	—	—	—	—	—		Mutineers
"I Do" (Aloe Blacc with LeAnn Rimes)	2021	—	—	—	—	—	—	—	—	—	—		All Love Everything (Deluxe)
"Uninvited" (Dave Audé with LeAnn Rimes)	2022	—	—	—	—	—	—	—	—	—	—		Motions
"Jealous of Myself" (Tenille Arts with LeAnn Rimes)	2023	—	—	—	—	—	—	—	—	—	—		To Be Honest
"—" denotes a recording that did not chart or was not released in that territory.

=== Christmas singles ===
List of singles, with selected chart positions, showing other relevant details
Title	Year	Peak chart positions				Album
Title	Year	US Cou.	US Cou. Air.	US AC	CAN AC	Album
"Put a Little Holiday in Your Heart"	1996	51		—	—	Blue (bonus CD single)
"O Holy Night"	2004	—		14	—	What a Wonderful World
"Rockin' Around the Christmas Tree"	2004	48		3	—	What a Wonderful World
"A Different Kind of Christmas"	2004	50		—	—	What a Wonderful World
"Have Yourself a Merry Little Christmas"	2005	60		—	—	What a Wonderful World
"Santa Baby"	2010	—		—	—	—N/a
"I Want a Hippopotamus for Christmas"	2014	—		25	—	One Christmas: Chapter 1
"Celebrate Me Home" (with Gavin DeGraw)	2015	—		12	25	Today Is Christmas
"Today Is Christmas"	2016	—	60	—	—	Today Is Christmas
"All I Want for Christmas Is You" (Single Mix)	2025	—	—	9	—	Greatest Hits Christmas
"—" denotes a recording that did not chart or was not released in that territory.

=== Promotional singles ===
Title	Year	Album
"Sittin' on Top of the World" (Remixes)	1998	Sittin' on Top of the World
"Right Kind of Wrong" (Remixes)	2001	Coyote Ugly
"You Are" (Remixes)	2001	I Need You
"One Way Ticket (Re-Imagined)"	2018	Re-Imagined
"Blue (Re-Imagined)" (Live)	2018	Re-Imagined
"Can't Fight the Moonlight (Re-Imagined)" (Live)	2018	Re-Imagined
"Borrowed (Re-Imagined)" (with Stevie Nicks)	2018	Re-Imagined
"Coyote Ugly" (Dave Audé Megamix)	2020	—
"The Right Kind of Wrong" (Dave Audé Mix)	2020	—
"But I Do Love You" (Dave Audé Mix)	2020	—
"Please Remember" (Dave Audé Mix)	2020	—
"Can't Fight the Moonlight" (Dave Audé Mix)	2020	—
"My Heart"	2020	Chant: The Human & the Holy
"Sing Love into the World"	2020	Chant: The Human & the Holy
"The Only" (featuring Ziggy Marley, Ledisi and Ben Harper)	2022	God's Work
"The Wild"	2022	God's Work
"Awakening"	2022	God's Work

== Other album appearances ==
List of non-single guest appearances, with other performing artists, showing year released and album name
Title	Year	Other artist(s)	Album	Ref.
"How Do I Live" (Live)	1999	—N/a	Divas Live '99	
"Leaving's Not Leaving"	1999	—N/a	Anywhere But Here: Music from the Motion Picture	
"Can't Fight the Moonlight"	2000	—N/a	Coyote Ugly (soundtrack)	
"Please Remember"	2000	—N/a	Coyote Ugly (soundtrack)	
"The Right Kind of Wrong"	2000	—N/a	Coyote Ugly (soundtrack)	
"But I Do Love You"	2000	—N/a	Coyote Ugly (soundtrack)	
"I Need You" (Radio Edit)	2000	—N/a	Wings of a Dove	
"I Believe in You"	2001	—N/a	Wings of a Dove, Vol. 2	
"(Everything I Do) I Do It for You"	2004	Kenny G	At Last...The Duets Album	
"We're Running Out of Time"	2005	—N/a	Music from and Inspired by Desperate Housewives	
"What You Don't Say"	2006	Vince Gill	These Days	
"(If Loving You Is Wrong) I Don't Want to Be Right"	2006	—N/a	She Was Country When Country Wasn't Cool: A Tribute to Barbara Mandrell	
"Ready for a Miracle"	2007	—N/a	Evan Almighty: Music from and Inspired by the Motion Picture	
"When You Love Someone Like That"	2007	Reba McEntire	Reba Duets	
"For Good"	2008	Delta Goodrem	Wicked: 5th Anniversary Special Edition	
"Here Comes Santa Claus"	2008	Elvis Presley	Christmas Duets	
"The Closest Thing to Crazy"	2010	Elaine Paige	Elaine Paige and Friends	
"Grace"	2014	The Crystal Method	The Crystal Method	
"America the Beautiful"	2017	—N/a	Lucky Logan (soundtrack)	
"Lovestoned"	2017	Trevor Lawrence Jr. Drumpimp; Nicholas Payton	Relationships	
"Have Mercy"	2023	—N/a	A Tribute to The Judds	
