= All-Time Greatest Hits (LeAnn Rimes album) =

Greatest hits album by LeAnn Rimes
- Released: February 3, 2015
- Recorded: 1996–2007
- Genres: Country; pop
- Length: 74:00
- Label: Curb
- Producers: Chuck Howard; Dann Huff; Desmond Child; Gregg Pagani; Greg Walker; Johnny Mulhair; Mike Curb; Trevor Horn; LeAnn Rimes; Peter Amato; Greg Walker; Wilbur C. Rimes; Johnny Mulhair

LeAnn Rimes chronology
One Christmas: Chapter 1 (2014)	All-Time Greatest Hits (2015)	Today Is Christmas (2015)

All-Time Greatest Hits is the fourth greatest hits album by American country singer LeAnn Rimes. The album was released on February 3, 2015, by Curb Records. It peaked at number 30 on the Billboard Top Country Albums chart.

== Background and release ==
The album was released on CD, digital download and streaming services on February 3, 2015, by Curb Records. The album consists of thirteen tracks taken from Rimes' first greatest hits album, which this album is a follow-up to, and contains two non-single releases, as well as her top ten hits released after Greatest Hits.

== Critical reception ==
Professional ratings
Review scores
Source	Rating
Allmusic	4.5/5 stars

Stephen Thomas Erlewine of Allmusic gave the album four and a half out of five stars and praise the album stating that it "concentrates on the radio songs people know, and it's better for it."

== Commercial performance ==
The album peaked at number thirty on the Billboard Top Country Albums chart.

== Track listing ==
All-Time Greatest Hits track listing
No.	Title	Writer(s)	Original release	Length
1.	"Blue"	Bill Mack	Blue	2:49
2.	"One Way Ticket (Because I Can)"	Judy Rodman; Keith Hinton	Blue	3:44
3.	"Unchained Melody"	Alex North; Hy Zaret	Unchained Melody: The Early Years	3:52
4.	"The Light in Your Eyes"	Dan Tyler	Blue	3:21
5.	"How Do I Live"	Diane Warren	You Light Up My Life: Inspirational Songs	4:27
6.	"You Light Up My Life"	Joe Brooks	You Light Up My Life: Inspirational Songs	3:37
7.	"Amazing Grace"	John Newton	You Light Up My Life: Inspirational Songs	4:05
8.	"On the Side of Angels"	Gerry House; Gary Burr	You Light Up My Life: Inspirational Songs	3:49
9.	"Commitment"	Tony Colton; Tony Marty; Bobby Wood	Sittin' on Top of the World	4:36
10.	"Nothin' New Under the Moon"	Rick Bowles; Tom Shapiro; Josh Leo	Sittin' on Top of the World	3:31
11.	"Big Deal"	Al Anderson; Jeffrey Steele	LeAnn Rimes	3:08
12.	"I Need You"	Dennis Matkosky; Ty Lacy	Jesus: Music from and Inspired by the Epic Mini-Series	3:49
13.	"Can't Fight the Moonlight"	Warren	Coyote Ugly: Soundtrack	3:35
14.	"But I Do Love You"	Warren	Coyote Ugly: Soundtrack	3:21
15.	"The Right Kind of Wrong"	Warren	Coyote Ugly: Soundtrack	3:47
16.	"Life Goes On"	L. Rimes; Desmond Child; Andreas Carlsson	Twisted Angel	3:33
17.	"Nothin' 'bout Love Makes Sense"	Kylie Sackley; Burr; Joel Feeney	This Woman	2:57
18.	"Probably Wouldn't Be This Way"	John Kennedy; Tammi Kidd	This Woman	3:37
19.	"Something's Gotta Give"	Craig Wiseman; Tony Mullins	This Woman	3:56
20.	"Nothin' Better to Do"	L. Rimes; Dean Sheremet; Darrell Brown	Family	4:26
Total length:				74:00

Notes

- Japanese edition includes additional track “Looking Through Your Eyes" as track 10.

== Personnel ==
Credits for All-Time Greatest Hits adapted from AllMusic and liner notes. Additionally credits adapted from the liner notes of the Coyote Ugly soundtrack, You Light Up My Life: Inspirational Songs, Blue, UK version of Sittin' on Top of the World, Twisted Angel, Unchained Melody: The Early Years, Family and This Woman.

- LeAnn Rimes – vocals, songwriter, producer, backing vocals
- Wilbur C. Rimes – producer
- Gary Leach – assistant engineer, backing vocals, keyboard
- Greg Hunt – engineer
- Steve MacMillan – engineer, mixing
- Johnny Mulhair – engineer, co-producer, acoustic guitar, electric guitar, steel guitar
- Gregg Pagani – producer, keyboard, arrangement
- Greg Walker – production assistant
- Austin Deptula – assistant engineer
- Bob Campbell-Smith – production assistant
- Chuck Howard – producer
- Dann Huff – producer, electric guitar, guitar, acoustic guitar
- Desmond Child – songwriter, producer
- Mike Curb – producer
- Pete Amato – producer, keyboard, arrangement
- Tim Weidner – engineer
- Trevor Horn – producer
- Ben Fowler – recording
- Mark Hagen – recording
- Jed Hackett – recording
- Brady Barnett – recording
- Tod Gunnerson – assistant recording
- David Bryant – assistant recording
- Greg Lawrence – assistant recording
- Justin Niebank – mixing
- Jeff Balding – mixing
- Drew Bollman – assistant mixing
- Scott Kidd – assistant mixing
- Gavin Lurssen – mastering
- Adam Ayan – mastering
- David Campbell – orchestra arrangement
- Sara Lind – technical assistant
- Robert Orton – technical assistant
- Christopher Rowe – digital editing
- Mike "Frog" Griffith – production coordinator
- Jamie Muhoberac – keyboards, bass
- Kelly Glenn – keyboards, piano
- Jimmy Kelly – keyboards, piano
- Steve Nathan – keyboards
- Tim Akers – keyboards
- Charlie Judge – keyboards
- Lee Sklar – bass
- Abe Laboriel Sr. – bass
- Jimmy Lee Sloas – bass
- Bob Gentry – bass
- Curtis Randall – bass, backing vocals
- Michael Rhodes – bass
- Mike Chapman – bass
- Glen Worf – bass
- Bob Smith – bass
- John Robinson – drums
- Curt Bisquera – drums
- Fred Gleber – drums
- Brad Billinsley – drums
- Chad Cromwell – drums
- Abe Laboriel Jr. – drums
- Chris McHugh – drums
- Vinnie Colaiuta – drums
- Fred Gleber – drums
- Greg Morrow – drums
- Dan Wojciechowski — drums
- Terry McMillan – percussion
- Carl Albrecht – percussion
- Fred Glieber – percussion
- Eric Darken – percussion
- Alan Pasqua – piano
- Paul Goad – piano, bass
- Mike McLian – piano
- John Hobbs – piano
- Tim Pierce – guitar
- Michael Landau – guitar
- Stuart Mathis – guitar
- J.T. Corenflos – guitar
- Jerry Metheny – electric guitar, acoustic guitar
- John Willis – electric guitars
- Milo Deering – acoustic guitars, steel guitar, fiddle
- Michael Spriggs – acoustic guitar
- Paul Franklin – steel guitar
- Brent Rowan – electric guitar
- John Jorgenson – electric guitar
- Bruce Bouton – steel guitar
- Marty Walsh – acoustic guitar, electric guitar
- Tom Bukovac – guitar, electric guitar
- B. James Larry – acoustic guitar
- Dan Dugmore – steel guitar
- Johnathan Yudkins – banjo, fiddle, mandolin
- Larry Franklin – fiddle
- Chuck Rippey – fiddle
- Sue Ann Carwell – background vocals
- Niki Harris – background vocals
- Michael Black – background vocals
- Mary Ann Kennedy – background vocals
- Pam Rose – background vocals
- Dennis Willson – background vocals
- Joy McKay – background vocals
- Perry Coleman – background vocals
- Ladonna Johnson – background vocals
- Matthew Ward – background vocals
- Crista Carnes – background vocals
- Kayla Powell – background vocals
- Lisa Criss – background vocals
- Dennis Wilson – background vocals
- Chastity Marie – background vocals
- Stephenie Marie – background vocals
- Rita Baloche – background vocals
- Debi Lee – background vocals
- Sherree Ford – background vocals, vocal arrangements
- Nora Payne – background vocals
- Joanna Janet – background vocals
- Dan Tyminski – background vocals
- Russell Terrell – background vocals
- Kevin Bailey – harmonica
- Ray Carl – harmonies
- Tim Lauer – farfisa organ, casio keyboard
- Tim Akers – Wurlitzer
- Bruce Bouton – dobro

== Charts ==
Chart performance for All-Time Greatest Hits
Chart (2015)	Peak position
US Top Country Albums (Billboard)	30

== Release history ==
Release date and formats for All-Time Greatest Hits
Region	Date	Format	Label	Ref.
United States	February 3, 2015	CD; digital download; streaming	Curb Records	
United Kingdom	July 17, 2015	CD; digital download; streaming	Curb/Rhino Records	
