= Greatest Hits (LeAnn Rimes album) =

Greatest hits album by LeAnn Rimes
- Released: November 18, 2003
- Recorded: 1996–2003
- Genres: Country; pop
- Length: 66:25
- Label: Asylum-Curb
- Producers: Chuck Howard; Dann Huff; Desmond Child; Gregg Pagani; Greg Walker; Johnny Mulhair; Mike Curb; Trevor Horn; LeAnn Rimes; Peter Amato; Peter Collins; Steve Robson; Wilbur C. Rimes

LeAnn Rimes chronology
| Twisted Angel (2002) | Greatest Hits (2003) | The Best of LeAnn Rimes (2004) |

Singles from Greatest Hits
- 1. "This Love" Released: November 17, 2003

Professional ratings
Review scores
| Source | Rating |
|---|---|
| Allmusic | 3/5 stars |
| The Rolling Stone Album Guide | 3/5 stars |

Greatest Hits (originally titled Greatest Hits (To Be Continued)) is a compilation album by American country music singer LeAnn Rimes, released in the United States on November 18, 2003, by Curb Records.

== Content and release ==
The album contains 2 new songs: "This Love", which Rimes co-wrote alongside Marc Beeson and Jim Collins and speaks about her love for her then husband, Dean Sheremet, "Last Thing on My Mind", a duet with Irish pop singer Ronan Keating, and included "We Can", which had been previously released as a single for the Legally Blonde 2: Motion Picture Soundtrack. "This Love" was the sole single released from the album.

The album was originally released with a limited edition bonus track and DVD. The limited edition bonus track of "O Holy Night" was used to promote her 2004, What a Wonderful World, holiday album. The limited edition DVD contained three music videos ("Blue", "How Do I Live", and "We Can") and the Music in High Places performance of "Can't Fight the Moonlight". The DVD also contained four twenty-one second sound bites each of which Rimes describes the making of the music videos and her enjoyment of her Music in High Places performance of "Can't Fight the Moonlight".

On August 5, 2014, Greatest Hits was issued as a 2-CD limited edition exclusively to US Walmart stores. This limited edition contains Greatest Hits and the dance remix album, Dance Like You Don't Give a.... Greatest Hits Remixes.

== Track listing ==
Reissue track listing
| No. | Title | Writer(s) | Producer(s) | Length |
|---|---|---|---|---|
| 1. | "Blue" (from Blue) | Bill Mack | Wilbur C. Rimes | 2:49 |
| 2. | "How Do I Live" (Single Version) | Diane Warren | Chuck Howard; W. Rimes; Mike Curb | 4:26 |
| 3. | "Can't Fight the Moonlight" (Graham Stack Radio Edit, from Coyote Ugly Soundtrack) | Warren | Trevor Horn | 3:37 |
| 4. | "One Way Ticket" (from Blue) | Judy Rodman; Keith Hinton | Howard; W. Rimes | 3:43 |
| 5. | "Commitment" (from Sittin' on Top of the World) | Tony Colton; Tony Marty; Bobby Wood | W. Rimes | 4:36 |
| 6. | "I Need You" (from Jesus: Music from and Inspired by the Epic Mini-Series) | Dennis Matkosky; Ty Lacy | W. Rimes; LeAnn Rimes | 3:48 |
| 7. | "Written in the Stars" (Duet with Elton John, from Aida) | Elton John; Tim Rice | Peter Collins; W. Rimes | 4:18 |
| 8. | "Unchained Melody" (from Unchained Melody: The Early Years) | Alex North; Hy Zaret | W. Rimes | 3:52 |
| 9. | "The Light in Your Eyes" (from Blue) | Dan Tyler | Howard; Johnny Mulhair; W. Rimes | 3:21 |
| 10. | "On the Side of Angels" (from You Light Up My Life: Inspirational Songs) | Gerry House; Gary Burr | W. Rimes | 3:50 |
| 11. | "You Light Up My Life" (from You Light Up My Life: Inspirational Songs) | Joe Brooks | Curb; Howard; W. Rimes | 3:38 |
| 12. | "Nothin' New Under the Moon" (from Sittin' on Top of the World) | Rick Bowles; Tom Shapiro; Josh Leo | W. Rimes | 3:30 |
| 13. | "Big Deal" (from LeAnn Rimes) | Al Anderson; Jeffrey Steele | W. Rimes | 3:07 |
| 14. | "Life Goes On" (from Twisted Angel) | LeAnn Rimes; Desmond Child; Andreas Carlsson | Desmond Child; Peter Amato; Gregg Pagani | 3:34 |
| 15. | "We Can" (from Legally Blonde 2: Red, White & Blonde – Motion Picture Soundtrack) | Warren | Dann Huff | 3:37 |
| 16. | "Last Thing on My Mind" (Duet with Ronan Keating, new recording) | Ronan Keating; Steve Robson | Steve Robson | 4:00 |
| 17. | "This Love" (new recording) | L. Rimes; Marc Beeson; Jim Collins | Huff | 3:47 |
| 18. | "Crazy" (from LeAnn Rimes) | Willie Nelson | W. Rimes | 2:52 |
| Total length: | | | | 66:25 |

Limited edition bonus track
| No. | Title | Writer(s) | Length |
|---|---|---|---|
| 19. | "O Holy Night" | Placide Clappeau | 3:42 |
| Total length: | | | 70:07 |

Limited edition bonus DVD
| No. | Title | Length |
|---|---|---|
| 1. | "Blue" (Music Video) | 2:52 |
| 2. | "How Do I Live" (Music Video) | 4:30 |
| 3. | "Can't Fight the Moonlight" (Music in High Places Performance) | 3:56 |
| 4. | "We Can" (Non-Movie Music Video) | 3:40 |
| 5. | "Blue" (Music video) (Sound Bite) | 0:21 |
| 6. | "How Do I Live" (Music video) (Sound Bite) | 0:21 |
| 7. | "Can't Fight the Moonlight" (Music in High Places Performance) (Sound Bite) | 0:21 |
| 8. | "We Can" (Music video) (Sound Bite) | 0:21 |

Japanese track listing
| No. | Title | Writer(s) | Length |
|---|---|---|---|
| 1. | "We Can" | Diane Warren | 3:37 |
| 2. | "Blue" | Bill Mack | 2:49 |
| 3. | "How Do I Live" | Warren | 4:26 |
| 4. | "Can't Fight the Moonlight" (Graham Stack Radio Edit) | Warren | 3:37 |
| 5. | "One Way Ticket (Because I Can)" | Judy Rodman, Keith Hinton | 3:43 |
| 6. | "Life Goes On" | Rimes, Desmond Child, Andreas Carlsson | 3:34 |
| 7. | "Commitment" | Tony Colton, Tony Marty, Bobby Wood | 4:36 |
| 8. | "I Need You" | Dennis Matkosky, Ty Lacy | 3:48 |
| 9. | "Written in the Stars" (Duet with Elton John) | Elton John, Tim Rice | 4:18 |
| 10. | "Unchained Melody" | Alex North, Hy Zaret | 3:52 |
| 11. | "The Light in Your Eyes" | Dan Tyler | 3:21 |
| 12. | "Looking Through Your Eyes" | David Foster, Carole Bayer Sager | 4:05 |
| 13. | "You Light Up My Life" | Joe Brooks | 3:38 |
| 14. | "Suddenly" | Carlsson, Child | 3:58 |
| 15. | "Nothin' New Under the Moon" | Rick Bowles, Tom Shapiro, Josh Leo | 3:30 |
| 16. | "Big Deal" | Al Anderson, Jeffrey Steele | 3:07 |
| 17. | "But I Do Love You" | Warren | 3:21 |
| 18. | "Last Thing on My Mind" (Duet with Ronan Keating) | Ronan Keating, Steve Robson | 4:00 |
| 19. | "This Love" | Rimes, Marc Beeson, Jim Collins | 3:47 |
| 20. | "Crazy" | Willie Nelson TV | 2:52 |
| 21. | "O Holy Night" | Placide Cappeau | 3:42 |
| Total length: | | | 77:33 |

== Personnel ==
- Tim Akers – keyboards
- Tom Bukovac – electric guitar
- David Campbell – string arrangements, conductor
- Kevin St. Claire – choir
- Lisa Cochran – background vocals
- Perry Coleman – background vocals
- Eric Darken – percussion
- Greg Davies – choir
- Dan Dugmore – steel guitar
- Sheila E. – drums
- Claire Fedoruk – choir
- Amy Fogerson – choir
- Shannon Forrest – drums
- Grant Geiger – choir, choir arrangements
- Greg Geiger – choir
- Grant Gershon – choir
- Stephen Grimm – choir
- Michael Herring – acoustic guitar, soloist
- Marie Hodgson – choir
- Drew Holt – choir
- Dann Huff – electric guitar
- Elton John – vocals on "Written in the Stars"
- Elissa Johnston – choir
- Ronan Keating – vocals on "Last Thing on My Mind"
- Charles Lane – choir
- Shawn Lee – drums, percussion
- Robert Lewis – choir
- The London Session Orchestra – strings
- B. James Lowry – acoustic guitar
- Jerry McPherson – electric guitar
- Wil Malone – string arrangements, conductor
- Dominic Miller – acoustic guitar, electric guitar
- Steve Nathan – keyboards
- Cassandra O'Neal – piano
- Dean Parks – acoustic guitar
- Helene Quintana – choir
- LeAnn Rimes – lead vocals
- Steve Robson – acoustic guitar, keyboards
- Leland Sklar – bass guitar
- Kimberly Swizter – choir
- Rohan Thomas – keyboards
- Michael Thompson – electric guitar, slide guitar
- Patrick Warren – pump organ, synthesizer strings
- Glenn Worf – bass guitar

== Charts ==
Greatest Hits debuted at No. 24 on Billboard 200 with 70,686 copies sold in its first week.

=== Weekly charts ===
Weekly chart performance for Greatest Hits
| Chart (2003) | Peak position |
|---|---|
| Australian Albums (ARIA) | 30 |
| Australian Country Albums (ARIA) | 1 |
| Japanese Albums (Oricon) | 68 |
| New Zealand Albums (RMNZ) | 19 |
| US Billboard 200 | 24 |
| US Top Country Albums (Billboard) | 3 |
| Chart (2014) | Position |
| US Top Dance/Electronic Albums (Billboard) (2-CD Set with Dance Like You Don't Give A.... Greatest Hits Remixes) | 19 |

=== Year-end chart ===
| Chart (2003) | Position |
|---|---|
| Australian Country Albums (ARIA) | 17 |
| Chart (2004) | Position |
| Australian Country Albums (ARIA) | 17 |
| US Billboard 200 | 142 |
| US Top Country Albums (Billboard) | 19 |
| Chart (2005) | Position |
| US Top Country Albums (Billboard) | 58 |

=== Sales ===
| Region | Certification | Certified units/sales |
|---|---|---|
| Australia (ARIA) | Gold | 35,000^{^} |
| New Zealand (RMNZ) | Gold | 7,500^{^} |
| United States (RIAA) | Platinum | 1,000,000^{^} |
^{^} Shipments figures based on certification alone.

== See also ==
- 2003 in music
