= The Best of LeAnn Rimes =

Greatest hits album by LeAnn Rimes
- Released: February 2, 2004
- Recorded: 1994–2003
- Genre: Country; pop
- Length: 75:08 (Asian)
- Label: Asylum-Curb
- Producer: Various record producers

LeAnn Rimes chronology
Greatest Hits (2003)	The Best of LeAnn Rimes (2004)	What a Wonderful World (2004)

Singles from The Best of LeAnn Rimes
- 1. "This Love" Released: February 3, 2004

The Best of LeAnn Rimes is a greatest hits album by American country singer LeAnn Rimes. Released on February 2, 2004, the album focuses on her pop crossover songs which were hits internationally, including "How Do I Live", "Can't Fight the Moonlight" and her duet with Ronan Keating, "Last Thing on My Mind". A standalone DVD of the same name was also released featuring music videos.

On June 21, 2004, Rimes released The Best of LeAnn Rimes: Remixed, a complementary album featuring remixes.

Professional ratings
Review scores
Source	Rating
AllMusic	3/5 stars

== Track listing ==
=== The Best of LeAnn Rimes ===
UK edition
No.	Title	Writer(s)	Length
1.	"Can't Fight the Moonlight"	Diane Warren	3:36
2.	"Life Goes On"	Andreas Carlsson, Desmond Child, Rimes	3:34
3.	"How Do I Live"	Warren	4:27
4.	"I Need You"	Dennis Matkosky, Ty Lacy	3:49
5.	"We Can"	Warren	3:39
6.	"Last Thing on My Mind" (duet with Ronan Keating)	Ronan Keating, Steve Robson	3:57
7.	"This Love"	Rimes, Marc Beeson, Jim Collins	3:53
8.	"But I Do Love You"	Warren	3:20
9.	"Written in the Stars" (duet with Elton John)	Elton John, Tim Rice	4:19
10.	"Suddenly"	Carlsson, Child	4:00
11.	"The Right Kind of Wrong"	Warren	3:48
12.	"Commitment"	Tony Colton, Tony Marty, Bobby Wood	4:36
13.	"Please Remember"	Warren	4:34
14.	"Crazy"	Willie Nelson	2:55
15.	"Blue"	Bill Mack	2:49
16.	"Looking Through Your Eyes"	David Foster, Carole Bayer Sager	4:00
17.	"You Light Up My Life"	Joe Brooks	3:38
18.	"One Way Ticket (Because I Can)"	Keith Hinton, Judy Rodman	3:34
19.	"How Do I Live" (Mr. Mig Dance Radio Edit)	Warren	3:57
20.	"Can't Fight the Moonlight" (Latino Mix)	Warren	3:35

Asian edition
No.	Title	Writer(s)	Length
1.	"Can't Fight the Moonlight"	Diane Warren	3:36
2.	"Life Goes On"	Andreas Carlsson, Desmond Child, Rimes	3:34
3.	"How Do I Live"	Warren	4:27
4.	"I Need You"	Dennis Matkosky, Ty Lacy	3:49
5.	"Last Thing on My Mind" (duet with Ronan Keating)	Ronan Keating, Steve Robson	3:57
6.	"But I Do Love You"	Warren	3:20
7.	"Written in the Stars" (duet with Elton John)	Elton John, Tim Rice	4:19
8.	"This Love"	Rimes, Marc Beeson, Jim Collins	3:53
9.	"We Can"	Warren	3:39
10.	"Suddenly"	Carlsson, Child	4:00
11.	"You Light Up My Life"	Joe Brooks	3:38
12.	"Crazy"	Willie Nelson	2:55
13.	"Unchained Melody"	Alex North, Hy Zaret	3:53
14.	"Looking Through Your Eyes"	David Foster, Carole Bayer Sager	4:00
15.	"Blue"	Bill Mack	2:49
16.	"You Are"	Laurie Webb	3:45
17.	"The Right Kind of Wrong"	Warren	3:48
18.	"Soon"	Warren	3:56
19.	"Yesterday"	John Lennon, Paul McCartney	3:57
20.	"I Will Always Love You"	Dolly Parton	3:35

Asian release bonus VCD
No.	Title	Writer(s)	Length
1.	"Life Goes On" (Karaoke) (Music Video)	Andreas Carlsson, Desmond Child, Rimes	3:41
2.	"How Do I Live" (Karaoke) (Music Video)	Diane Warren	4:37
3.	"I Need You" (Karaoke) (Music Video)	Dennis Matkosky, Ty Lacy	3:30
4.	"Suddenly" (Karaoke) (Music Video)	Carlsson, Child	4:08
5.	"We Can" (Non-movie version) (Karaoke) (Music Video))	Warren	3:46
6.	"Can't Fight the Moonlight" (Music in High Places performance)	Warren	3:30

DVD
No.	Title	Length
1.	"Can't Fight the Moonlight"	3:42
2.	"Life Goes On"	3:31
3.	"How Do I Live"	4:28
4.	"I Need You"	3:50
5.	"We Can"	3:42
6.	"But I Do Love You"	3:40
7.	"Suddenly"	4:00
8.	"Commitment"	4:38
9.	"Blue"	2:50
10.	"You Light Up My Life"	3:40
11.	"One Way Ticket (Because I Can)"	3:45
12.	"The Light in Your Eyes"	3:22

=== The Best of LeAnn Rimes: Remixed ===
Standard edition
No.	Title	Writer(s)	Length
1.	"Can't Fight the Moonlight" (Latino Mix)	Diane Warren	3:35
2.	"Soon" (Graham Stack Radio Edit)	Diane Warren	4:07
3.	"I Need You" (Dave Aude Radio Edit)	Dennis Matkosky, Ty Lacy	4:22
4.	"But I Do Love You" (Almighty Radio Edit)	Diane Warren	4:02
5.	"We Can" (Widelife Radio Edit)	Diane Warren	3:47
6.	"Last Thing on My Mind" (Metro Mix)	Ronan Keating, Steve Robson	3:34
7.	"Suddenly" (Riva Radio Edit)	Carlsson, Child	4:07
8.	"Sittin' on Top of the World" (Aurora Borealis Radio Edit)	Amanda Marshall	4:36
9.	"The Right Kind of Wrong" (Graham Stack Radio Edit)	Diane Warren	3:26
10.	"You Are" (Bertoldo Radio Edit)	Laurie Webb	3:44
11.	"Tic Toc" (Thunderpuss Radio Edit)	Amato, Pagani, Christina Rumbley	3:46
12.	"How Do I Live" (Mr. Mig Dance Radio Edit)	Diane Warren	3:54
13.	"Life Goes On" (Peter Amato Radio Edit)	Andreas Carlsson, Desmond Child, Rimes	3:21
14.	"Over the Rainbow" ('A Cappella' Version)	Arlen, Harburg	2:48

== Personnel ==
- Tim Akers – keyboards
- Tom Bukovac – electric guitar
- Lisa Cochran – background vocals
- Perry Coleman – background vocals
- Eric Darken – percussion
- Dan Dugmore – steel guitar
- Shannon Forrest – drums
- Dann Huff – electric guitar
- Elton John – duet vocals on "Written in the Stars"
- Ronan Keating – duet vocals on "Last Thing on My Mind"
- Shawn Lee – drums, percussion
- The London Session Orchestra – strings
- B. James Lowry – acoustic guitar
- Jerry McPherson – electric guitar
- Wil Malone – string arrangements, conductor
- Dominic Miller – acoustic guitar, electric guitar
- Steve Nathan – keyboards
- LeAnn Rimes – lead vocals
- Steve Robson – acoustic guitar, keyboards
- Rohan Thomas – keyboards
- Glenn Worf – bass guitar

== Charts ==
The Best of LeAnn Rimes debuted on UK Albums Chart at No. 2, the highest debut for Rimes on the UK Chart. It spent 16 weeks in the top 30 and was certified Platinum there. The album also peaked within the top 10 in five other countries in Europe.

=== The Best of LeAnn Rimes ===
==== Weekly charts ====
Weekly chart performance for The Best of LeAnn Rimes
Chart (2004)	Peak position
Australian Albums (ARIA)	141
Australian Country Albums (ARIA)	9
Austrian Albums (Ö3 Austria)	11
Danish Albums (Hitlisten)	10
European Albums (European Top 100 Albums)	9
German Albums (Offizielle Top 100)	8
Irish Albums (IRMA)	4
Singaporean Albums (RIAS)	3
Swedish Albums (Sverigetopplistan)	3
Swiss Albums (Schweizer Hitparade)	8
UK Albums (OCC)	2

==== Year end-chart ====
Chart (2004)	Position
Australian Country Albums (ARIA)	39
UK Albums (OCC)	38
Chart (2005)	Position
Australian Country Albums (ARIA)	35

==== Certifications ====
Certifications for The Best of LeAnn Rimes
Region	Certification	Certified units/sales
United Kingdom (BPI)	Platinum	300,000^{^}
^{^} Shipments figures based on certification alone.

=== The Best of LeAnn Rimes: Remixed ===
Chart (2004)	Peak position
Swiss Albums Chart	90
