= These Arms of Mine =

These Arms of Mine may refer to:

- These Arms of Mine (Otis Redding song), released in 1962
- These Arms of Mine (LeAnn Rimes song), released in 1998
- These Arms of Mine (TV series), a Canadian television drama series in the 2000–01 season
- These Arms of Mine (Grey's Anatomy), an episode of the television drama series Grey's Anatomy.
