= Everybody's Sweetheart =

Everybody's Sweetheart may refer to:

- Everybody's Sweetheart (1919 film), American comedy starring Elsie Janis; released as A Regular Girl
- Everybody's Sweetheart (1920 film), American drama starring Olive Thomas
- Everybody's Sweetheart (album), by LeAnn Rimes
- Everybody's Sweetheart (comic strip), by Edgar Martin; also known as Girls, Boots and Her Buddies, and Boots
- "Everybody's Sweetheart" (song), by Vince Gill
