= Dance Like You Don't Give a.... Greatest Hits Remixes =

Greatest hits album / remix album by LeAnn Rimes
- Released: August 5, 2014
- Recorded: 1997–2014
- Genre: Country; pop
- Length: 55:35
- Label: Curb
- Producer: Dann Huff; Wilbur C. Rimes; LeAnn Rimes; Darrell Brown; Mike Curb; Chuck Howard; Trevor Horn; Vince Gill; John Hobbs; Justin Niebamk; The Crystal Method; Bryan Stewart

LeAnn Rimes chronology
Spitfire (2013)	Dance Like You Don't Give a.... Greatest Hits Remixes (2014)	One Christmas: Chapter 1 (2014)

Dance Like You Don't Give a.... Greatest Hits Remixes is the third greatest hits album and second remix album by American country singer LeAnn Rimes. The album was released on August 5, 2014, by Curb Records. It became Rimes's first album to chart on the US Billboard Dance/Electronic Albums chart.

== Background and release ==
The album was originally set to be released in June 2014 but was postponed to August 5, 2014, where it was released to digital download and streaming services by Curb Records. The album was also released on CD exclusively to US Walmart stores along with Rimes's first greatest hits album. The album consists of remixes of Rimes's top 20 Hot 100 singles, as well as newer remixes of older hits. For the remixes to "Crazy Women" and "Spitfire", Rimes went back into the studio to record new vocals for the songs.

In an interview with Country Weekly Rimes stated, "Everyone knows I love to dance. What better way to celebrate the next chapter of my music than to remix some of my favorite hits from over the years to get my fans out on the dance floor shaking their asses."

== Commercial performance ==
The album debuted at number sixteen on the Billboard Dance/Electronic Albums chart, becoming Rimes's first album to ever enter the chart. However, due to the CD set released exclusively at Walmart containing Rimes's previously released Greatest Hits album the sales for that set, 2,000 units, were ineligible to be included with the stand-alone album and as such charted at number nineteen, three spots below it, on the Dance/Electronic Albums chart. The album peaked at number fifty on the Billboard Top Country Albums chart.

== Track listing ==
Dance Like You Don't Give a.... Greatest Hits Remixes
No.	Title	Writer(s)	Producer(s)	Length
1.	"Gasoline and Matches" (Dave Audé Remix; featuring Rob Thomas and Jeff Beck)	Buddy Miller; Julie Miller	L. Rimes; Darrell Brown; Dave Audé^{[a]}	4:43
2.	"What I Cannot Change" (Kaskade Remix)	L. Rimes; Brown	Dann Huff; Kaskade^{[a]}	3:38
3.	"Crazy Women" (7th Heaven Remix)	Brandy Clark; Jessie Jo Dillon; Shane McAnally	L. Rimes; Brown; Jon Dixon^{[a]}; Andy Wetson^{[a]}	3:21
4.	"I Need You" (Digital Dog Remix)	Dennis Matkosky; Ty Lacy	Wilbur C. Rimes; L. Rimes; Digital Dogs^{[a]}	4:48
5.	"Help Me Make It Through the Night" (Fear of Tigers Remix)	Kris Kristofferson	Vince Gill; Brown; L. Rimes; John Hobbs; Justin Niebamk; Benjamin Berry^{[a]}	3:07
6.	"Spitfire" (Fagault and Marina Remix)	L. Rimes; Brown; David Baerwald	L. Rimes; Brown; Evgeniy Kolesnikov^{[a]}; Marina Zaretskaya^{[a]}	3:52
7.	"Can't Fight the Moonlight" (Alias Remix)	Diane Warren	Trevor Horn; Julian Gingell^{[a]}; Barry Stone^{[a]}	4:58
8.	"You've Ruined Me" (Dave Audé Remix)	L. Rimes; Brown; John Shanks	L. Rimes; Brown; Dave Audé^{[a]}	3:51
9.	"How Do I Live" (Cahill Remix)	Warren	W. Rimes; Chuck Howard; Mike Curb; Cahill^{[a]}	6:29
10.	"Strong" (Cicada Remix)	Matkosky; Jess Cates; L. Rimes	Huff; Cicada^{[a]}	4:48
11.	"Nothin' Better to Do" (Soul Seekerz Remix)	Rimes; Dean Sheremet; Brown	Huff; Soul Seekerz^{[a]}	3:15
12.	"Headphones" (Headspinners Remix)	Blair Daly; Matkosky; L. Rimes	Huff; Almighty^{[a]}	3:39
13.	"Grace" (with The Crystal Method)	L. Rimes; Brown; Kenneth Jordan; Scott Kirkland	The Crystal Method	5:06
Total length:				55:35

Notes

- ^{^[a]} signifies remix producer.

== Credits and personnel ==
Additional credits for Dance Like You Don't Give a.... Greatest Hits Remixes adapted from liner notes.

- Benjamin Berry – remix (Fear of Tigers)
- Darrell Brown – executive producer
- LeAnn Rimes – executive producer, lead vocals, primary artist
- Bryan Stewart – executive producer
- Dan Tyminski – backing vocals
- Rob Thomas – vocals
- Dave Audé – remix
- Cahill – remix
- Jon Dixon – remix (7th Heaven Production)
- Andy Wetson – remix (7th Heaven Production)
- Kaskade – remix
- Digital Dogs – remix
- The Crystal Method – mixing, vocals
- Almighty – remix (Headspinners)
- Soul Seekerz – remix
- Cicada – remix
- Fear of Tigers – remix
- Eugeniy Kolesnikov – remix (Fagault & Marina)
- Marina Zaretskaya – remix (Fagault & Marina)
- Steve MacMillan – engineering, mixing
- Tim Weidner – additional engineering
- Greg Hunt – additional engineering, chief engineer
- Gary Leach – additional engineering, assistant engineer
- Austin Deptula – additional engineering, assistant engineer
- Julian Gingell – keyboards, programming, remix (The Alias)
- Barry Stone – keyboards, programming, remix (The Alias)
- Pete Hofmann – mixing

== Charts ==
Chart performance for Dance Like You Don't Give a.... Greatest Hits Remixes
Chart (2014)	Peak position
US Dance/Electronic Albums (Billboard)	16
US Dance/Electronic Albums (Billboard) (2-CD set with Greatest Hits)	19
US Top Country Albums (Billboard)	50

== Release history ==
Release date and formats for Dance Like You Don't Give a.... Greatest Hits Remixes
Region	Date	Format	Label	Ref.
United States	August 5, 2014	CD; digital download; streaming	Curb	
Various	August 5, 2014	Digital download; streaming	Curb	
