= One Christmas: Chapter 1 =

EP by LeAnn Rimes
- Released: October 28, 2014
- Studio: Blackbird Studios (Nashville, Tennessee); Capitol Studios (Hollywood, California); Surf Shack (Hollywood, California)
- Genre: Christmas; country; pop rock
- Length: 20:09
- Label: Iconic
- Producer: Dave Audé; Darrell Brown; LeAnn Rimes

LeAnn Rimes chronology
Dance Like You Don't Give a.... Greatest Hits Remixes (2014)	One Christmas: Chapter 1 (2014)	All-Time Greatest Hits (2015)

Singles from One Christmas: Chapter 1
- 1. "I Want a Hippopotamus for Christmas" Released: 2014

One Christmas: Chapter 1 is an extended play (EP) by American singer LeAnn Rimes. It was released on October 28, 2014, via the Iconic Entertainment Group and contained six tracks. The album was Rimes's second collection of Christmas music and second extended play released in her career. It received a positive response from AllMusic and later reached positions on the American Billboard charts.

== Background and content ==
LeAnn Rimes first issued a Christmas project in 2004, which was titled What a Wonderful World. However, Rimes was looking forward to recording new holiday material. "I love it. I miss making Christmas music, so I’m happy," she told Billboard in 2014. The extended play was co-produced by Rimes, along with long-time collaborator Darrell Brown and Dave Audé. Rimes recorded the project at three separate studios: Blackbird Studios (located in Nashville, Tennessee), Capitol Recording Studios (located in Hollywood, California) and Surf Shack (also located in Hollywood). The extended play contained a total of six songs, each of which were favorites of Rimes. This included "Silent Night", "Christmas in Dixie" and "White Christmas". The latter recording was a family favorite, according to Rimes.

== Release and reception ==
Professional ratings
Review scores
Source	Rating
AllMusic	3/5 stars

One Christmas: Chapter 1 was released on October 28, 2014, on Iconic Entertainment. It was Rimes's first release with the label and her second extended play issued in her career. It was offered as both a compact disc and to digital markets. The album received three out of five stars from Stephen Thomas Erlewine of AllMusic: "Generally, One Christmas does operate at a slow burn -- "Somebody at Christmas" and "Hard Candy Christmas" both simmer, with only "Carol of the Bells" sparkling perhaps a bit too much, providing a quickening tempo—but Rimes' decision to play it cool in addition to having a bit of fun makes One Christmas a neat little seasonal treat," he commented. Dan MacIntosh of Country Standard Time gave it a mixed response: "As an album, One Christmas: Chapter 1 is about as creative as its title - which is not all that innovative. However, Rimes is a fantastic singer that sounds consistently wonderful throughout," he commented.

On the Billboard 200, the EP reached number 172, spending only a week on the chart. It also spent eight weeks on the Top Country Albums chart, reaching number 20 in December 2014. It also reached number 35 on the Top Holiday Albums chart, spending two weeks there. "I Want a Hippopotamus for Christmas" was released as a single from the project in 2014, peaking at number 25 on the Billboard adult contemporary songs chart.

== Track listing ==
One Christmas: Chapter 1
No.	Title	Writer(s)	Length
1.	"Silent Night Holy Night"	Joseph Mohr	3:34
2.	"I Want a Hippopotamus for Christmas"	Jon Rox	4:16
3.	"Blue Christmas"	Bill Hayes; Jay W. Johnson	3:35
4.	"Someday at Christmas"	Ron Miller; Bryan Wells	3:31
5.	"Hard Candy Christmas"	Carol Hall	2:41
6.	"Carol of the Bells"	Mykola Leontovych; Peter Wilhousky	2:08
Total length:			20:09

== Personnel ==
All credits are adapted from the liner notes of One Christmas, Chapter 1 and AllMusic.

Musical personnel

- LeAnn Rimes – lead vocals, backing vocals
- Matt Rollings – acoustic piano, Wurlitzer electric piano, Hammond B3 organ
- Dean Parks – guitars
- Tim Pierce – guitars
- Waddy Wachtel – guitars
- Bob Glaub – bass
- Willie Weeks – bass
- Vinnie Colaiuta – drums, percussion
- Steve Jordan – drums
- Darrell Brown – percussion, backing vocals (6)
- Eric Darken – percussion
- Jonathan Yudkin – strings
- Rob Dzibula – horns (2)
- Nick Lane – horns (2)
- Lee Thornburg – horns (2), arrangements (2)
- Troy "Trombone Shorty" Andrews – horns (4)
- Tim Davis – backing vocals (6)

Technical personnel

- LeAnn Rimes – producer, arrangements, quotation author
- Darrell Brown – producer, arrangements, additional recording
- Dave Audé – producer (6), arrangements (6), mixing (6)
- Niko Bolas – recording, additional recording, mixing (1, 2, 3)
- Al Schmitt – mixing (1–5)
- Steve Genewick – additional recording, recording assistant, mix assistant
- Chandler Harrod – additional recording, recording assistant, mix assistant
- Ira Grylack – additional recording,
- Joe Napolitano – additional recording
- Lowell Reynolds – additional recording
- Ian Sefchick – mastering at Capitol Mastering (Hollywood, California)
- Paul Jamieson – technician
- Cindi Peters – production coordinator
- Brian O'Neil – product manager
- Ally Rodriguez – product manager
- Sara Hertel – photography
- Katie Moore – design

== Chart performance ==
Chart (2014)	Peak position
US Billboard 200	172
US Top Country Albums (Billboard)	20
US Top Holiday Albums (Billboard)	35

== Release history ==
Release history and formats for One Christmas, Chapter 1
Region	Date	Format	Label	Ref.
North America	October 28, 2014	Digital download; streaming; compact disc	Iconic Entertainment Group	
