= Marie Sisters =

American country music duo

- Origin: Lewisville, Texas, U.S.
- Genre: Country
- Years active: 2002 only
- Label: Universal/Republic
- Past members: Chaz Marie; Kessie Marie

Marie Sisters were an American country music act composed of sisters Chaz and Kessie Marie. Active only in the year 2002, the duo recorded one album for Universal/Republic Records and charted one single on the Billboard Hot Country Singles & Tracks (now Hot Country Songs) charts. This single, "Real Bad Mood", peaked at number 46.

== History ==
Chaz and Kessie Marie's mother was a singer in a group called The Singing Pages, which had opened for Hank Williams. Both sisters had served as songwriters in Nashville, Tennessee after moving there in 1997, and had sung backing vocals for LeAnn Rimes before signing to Universal/Republic Records in March 2002. That year, the duo released its debut single "Real Bad Mood." Co-written by Leslie Satcher, this song reached number 46 on the Billboard country charts at the end of the year.

The Marie Sisters' self-titled debut album was released in June 2002 to mostly positive reviews. About.com critic Jennifer Webb favored the album's song variety of material, stating that it "would definitely appeal to many people that like the more contemporary country sound." People magazine referred to "Real Bad Mood" as a "lively, sensual tune" and "far from the only strong track" on the album. Rick Teverbaugh, a reviewer for Country Standard Time, also described the lead-off single favorably, saying that it "gives the Marie Sisters' sound a real edge not that prevalent on today's country landscape", and although he said that the album's slower songs lacked that edge, these other songs still had "all the emotion needed for the often-sentimental expressions." Allmusic critic Robert L. Doershuk gave it two stars out of five, as he considered it largely formulaic, saying that its sound was "professional and polished, and also predictable." Songwriter Max T. Barnes produced the majority of the album. "Bring It On Back" was produced by Guy Roche, "I Will Hold On" and "If I Fall In Love" by Richard Marx, and "Kiss Me Goodbye" by Shep Goodman and Kenny Gioia. The album produced no other singles and the duo broke up afterward.

Chaz is now a solo artist.

== Marie Sisters (2002) ==
Marie Sisters

Studio album by Marie Sisters
- Released: June 11, 2002
- Genre: Country
- Label: Universal/Republic
- Producers: Max T. Barnes; Richard Marx; Guy Roche; Shep Goodman; Kenny Gioia

=== Track listing ===
1. "Real Bad Mood" (Don Poythress, Leslie Satcher) – 4:00
2. "Oh Yeah" (Jeremy Campbell, Noah Gordon) – 3:04
3. "Strong for You" (Max T. Barnes, T.W. Hale) – 3:24
4. "Bring It On Back" (Shi-Anne Ragsdale, Jason Sellers) – 4:00
5. "You Were a Mountain" (Max T. Barnes, Trey Bruce) – 3:21
6. "Still" (Brian McKnight, Brandon Barnes) – 3:45
7. "Crazy to Run" (Greg Humphrey, Laurie Webb) – 3:56
8. "I Will Hold On" (Greg Harrison, Richard Marx) – 4:12
9. "Circle of Love" (Del Harley, Allan Koppelberger, Webb) – 4:05
10. "Kiss Me Goodbye" (Shep Goodman, Kenny Gioia, Angela Ammons) – 3:51
11. "If I Fall in Love Tonight" (Gary Burr, Marx) – 3:34

=== Singles ===
Year	Single	Peak positions
Year	Single	US Country
2002	"Real Bad Mood"	46

=== Music videos ===
Year	Video	Director
2002	"Real Bad Mood"	Brad Furman
