= Lollievox =

American singer and songwriter (born 1985)

- Born: Laurie Webb; September 5, 1985 (age 40)
- Genres: Electronic, pop, country
- Occupations: Singer, songwriter
- Instruments: Vocals, guitar
- Website: www.lollievox.com

Lollievox (born Laurie Webb on September 5, 1985) is an American singer and songwriter.

As a songwriter, Lollievox worked for Curb Records and wrote for artists such as LeAnn Rimes, Marie Sisters, Audra & Alayna, Patsy Moore, Phil Keaggy, Amy Morriss, Heather Miller, Crystal Bernard, Jay Turner, Tamara Walker, Kenny Olson, 3 Track Mind and Emily White (together with Pebe Sebert). As a singer, she appeared on records by Godlikemouse, Faith Rivera, Harry Robinson, Delicious Blues Stew and Romantic Interludes. However, she is best known for her vocal samples on the popular software FL Studio and her songs "Aren't You Clever" and "Dance With Me", which have been remixed by countless DJs.

She has also made some guest vocal appearances on a few instrumental hip-hop songs produced by Newark, New Jersey–based composer Khiam Mincey.

== Discography ==
- 2005 – Dance With Me
- 2009 – Conscious Mind
- 2011– Optimum Momentum
- 2019– Pure Alkaline
