= This Love (LeAnn Rimes song) =

2003 single by LeAnn Rimes

Single by LeAnn Rimes

from the album Greatest Hits and The Best of LeAnn Rimes
- B-side: "The Right Kind of Wrong"; "Please Remember"
- Released: November 17, 2003
- Studio: Ocean Way, Nashville; Record One, Los Angeles (strings)
- Length: 3:54
- Label: Curb; London
- Songwriters: LeAnn Rimes; Marc Beeson; Jim Collins
- Producer: Dann Huff

LeAnn Rimes singles chronology
"We Can" (2003)	"This Love" (2003)	"Last Thing on My Mind" (2004)

Audio sample
- The chorus of Rimes' "This Love".: file; help

"This Love" is a song by American country pop musician LeAnn Rimes from her Greatest Hits compilation album (2003), released as the album's sole single. The song was co-written by Rimes along with Marc Beeson and Jim Collins and produced by Dann Huff. It is partly orchestrated, featuring a string arrangement consisting of violins, violas, and celli arranged and conducted by Canadian-American arranger David Campbell. The song was serviced to American country radio on November 17, 2003, and was issued as a CD single on February 2, 2004, in the United Kingdom.

"This Love" peaked at number 37 on the US Billboard Hot Country Singles & Tracks chart. Internationally, it reached number 54 on the UK Singles Chart, number 49 on the Romanian Singles Chart, and number 26 on the Irish Singles Chart. A live performance was used as the music video for the song. "This Love" was later included on her international greatest hits album, The Best of LeAnn Rimes (2004).

== Track listing ==
UK CD single

1. "This Love" – 3:54
2. "The Right Kind of Wrong" – 3:47
3. "Please Remember" – 4:34

== Credits and personnel ==
Credits are adapted from the UK CD single and Greatest Hits liner notes.

Studios

- Recorded at Ocean Way Nashville (Nashville, Tennessee)
- Strings recorded at Record One (Los Angeles, California)
- Mixed at Emerald Entertainment (Nashville, Tennessee)
- Mastered at Gateway Mastering (Portland, Maine, US)

Personnel

- LeAnn Rimes – writing, vocals
- Marc Beeson – writing
- Jim Collins – writing
- Lisa Cochran – backing vocals
- Perry Coleman – backing vocals
- B. James Lowry – acoustic guitar
- Dann Huff – electric guitar, production
- Jerry McPherson – electric guitar
- Tom Bukovac – electric guitar
- Dan Dugmore – steel guitar
- Glenn Worf – bass
- Steve Nathan – keyboards
- Tim Akers – keyboards
- Shannon Forrest – drums
- Eric Darken – percussion
- Jeff Balding – recording, mixing
- Mark Hagen – recording
- David Bryant – recording assistant
- Jed Hackett – mixing assistant
- John Saylor – mixing assistant
- Dino Herrmann – Pro Tools engineering
- Christopher Rowe – digital editing
- Adam Ayan – mastering

Orchestra

- Berj Garabedian – violin
- Joel Derouin – violin
- Josefina Vergara – violin
- Margaret Wooten – violin
- Michele Richards – violin
- Peter Kent – violin
- Evan Wilson – viola
- Bob Becker – viola
- Larry Corbett – cello
- Suzie Katayama – cello
- David Campbell – string arrangement, conducting
- Steve Churchyard – recording

== Charts ==
Weekly chart performance for "This Love"
Chart (2004)	Peak position
Ireland (IRMA)	26
Romania (Romanian Top 100)	49
Scotland Singles (OCC)	40
UK Singles (OCC)	54
US Hot Country Songs (Billboard)	37

== Release history ==
Release dates and formats for "This Love"
Region	Date	Format(s)	Label(s)	Ref.
United States	November 17, 2003	Country radio	Curb	
United Kingdom	February 2, 2004	CD single	Curb; London	
