= Last Thing on My Mind (Ronan Keating and LeAnn Rimes song) =

2004 single by Ronan Keating and LeAnn Rimes

Single by Ronan Keating and LeAnn Rimes

from the album Turn It On and The Best of LeAnn Rimes
- Released: 3 May 2004
- Length: 3:56
- Label: Polydor, Curb
- Songwriters: Steve Robson, Ronan Keating
- Producer: Steve Robson

Ronan Keating singles chronology
"She Believes (In Me)" (2004)	"Last Thing on My Mind" (2004)	"I Hope You Dance" (2004)

LeAnn Rimes singles chronology
"This Love" (2003)	"Last Thing on My Mind" (2004)	"Nothin' 'bout Love Makes Sense" (2004)

"Last Thing on My Mind" is the third and final single released from Irish singer-songwriter Ronan Keating's third studio album, Turn It On (2003). It was also included on LeAnn Rimes' Greatest Hits album as well as her Best of album. The song was released on 3 May 2004, peaking at number five on the UK Singles Chart. In the United States, the music video received heavy rotation on the VH1 Country channel and became an adult contemporary hit, reaching number 16 on the Billboard Adult Contemporary chart. Elsewhere, the song reached the top 40 in Austria, Denmark, and Ireland.

== Track listings ==
UK CD single

1. "Last Thing on My Mind" – 3:56
2. "Last Thing on My Mind" (Metro mix) – 3:37
3. "Last Thing on My Mind" (Mo Monkey mix) – 4:43
4. "Last Thing on My Mind" (video)

European CD single

1. "Last Thing on My Mind" (single version) – 3:56
2. "Last Thing on My Mind" (Metro mix) – 3:37

== Charts ==
=== Weekly charts ===
Weekly chart performance for "Last Thing on My Mind"
Chart (2004)	Peak position
Austria (Ö3 Austria Top 40)	33
Denmark (Tracklisten)	19
Europe (Eurochart Hot 100)	17
Germany (GfK)	50
Hungary (Rádiós Top 40)	5
Ireland (IRMA)	10
Netherlands (Single Top 100)	86
Scotland Singles (OCC)	4
Switzerland (Schweizer Hitparade)	44
UK Singles (OCC)	5
UK Airplay (Music Week)	8
US Adult Contemporary (Billboard)	16

=== Year-end charts ===
Year-end chart performance for "Last Thing on My Mind"
Chart (2004)	Position
Hungary (Rádiós Top 40)	52
UK Singles (OCC)	122
US Adult Contemporary (Billboard)	33

== Release history ==
Release dates and formats for "Last Thing on My Mind"
Region	Date	Format(s)	Label(s)	Ref.
United Kingdom	3 May 2004	CD single	Polydor; Curb	
United States	24 May 2004	Adult contemporary radio	Curb	
