= Looking Through Your Eyes =

1998 single by LeAnn Rimes

Single by LeAnn Rimes

from the album Quest for Camelot and Sittin' on Top of the World
- A-side: "Commitment"
- Released: March 24, 1998
- Length: 4:05
- Label: Curb
- Songwriters: David Foster; Carole Bayer Sager
- Producer: Wilbur C. Rimes

LeAnn Rimes singles chronology
"Commitment" (1998)	"Looking Through Your Eyes" (1998)	"Nothin' New Under the Moon" (1998)

"Looking Through Your Eyes" is a song by American country pop recording artist LeAnn Rimes. It was released as a single from the Quest for Camelot soundtrack and Rimes's album Sittin' on Top of the World on March 24, 1998. In most parts of the world, "Looking Through Your Eyes" was released as a double A-side with "Commitment".

"Looking Through Your Eyes" peaked at number four on the US Billboard Adult Contemporary chart, number 18 on the Billboard Hot 100, and number 38 on the UK Singles Chart. In the United States, the song was certified gold.

== Background ==
The song was performed in Quest for Camelot as a duet by Andrea Corr, the singing voice for the female lead Kayley, with Bryan White, the singing voice for the male lead of Garrett. It was also included as an instrumental on the soundtrack, credited to producer David Foster.

In most parts of the world, "Looking Through Your Eyes" was released as a double A-side with "Commitment". "Looking Through Your Eyes" was intended for pop radio, while "Commitment" was sent to country radio. Worldwide, the single was released in a variety of formats, with six different unique B-sides.

== Music video ==
The music video was directed by Chris Rogers and produced by Jamie Amos. It features Rimes performing the song alongside footage from the movie.

== Track listing ==
US CD and European CD1

1. "Looking Through Your Eyes" – 4:05
2. "Commitment" – 4:36

European CD2

1. "Looking Through Your Eyes" – 4:05
2. "Commitment" – 4:36
3. "Undeniable" – 3:44
4. "Feels Like Home" – 4:30

Australian CD

1. "Looking Through Your Eyes" – 4:05
2. "On the Side of Angels" – 3:48
3. "Hurt Me" – 2:54
4. "The Rose" – 3:33

French CD

1. "Looking Through Your Eyes" – 4:05
2. "How Do I Live" – 3:14

UK CD1

1. "Looking Through Your Eyes" – 4:05
2. "Commitment" – 4:36
3. "On The Side Of Angels" – 3:48

== Charts ==
=== Weekly charts ===
Chart (1998)	Peak position
Canada Adult Contemporary (RPM)	7
UK Singles (Official Charts) with "Commitment"	38
US Billboard Hot 100	18
US Adult Contemporary (Billboard)	4
US Adult Top 40 (Billboard)	55
US Mainstream Top 40 (Billboard)	60
US Rhythmic Top 40 (Billboard)	65

=== Year-end charts ===
Chart (1998)	Position
US Billboard Hot 100	60
US Adult Contemporary (Billboard)	15

== Certifications and sales ==
Certifications and sales for "Looking Through Your Eyes"
Region	Certification	Certified units/sales
United States (RIAA)	Gold	700,000

== Release history ==
Release dates and format(s) for "Looking Through Your Eyes"
Region	Date	Format(s)	Label(s)	Ref.
United States	March 24, 1998	Contemporary hit radio	Curb	
