= Today Is Christmas =

Studio album by LeAnn Rimes
- Released: October 16, 2015
- Recorded: 2015
- Studios: Capitol Studios, EastWest Studios and Sunset Sound Recorders (Hollywood, California); Surf Shack Studios (Los Angeles, California); Fonogenic Studios (Van Nuys, California); Mantis Studios (Sherman Oaks, California); Blackbird Studio (Nashville, Tennessee)
- Genres: Christmas; country
- Length: 40:28
- Label: Kobalt
- Producers: Darrell Brown; LeAnn Rimes; Niko Bolas; Dave Audé

LeAnn Rimes chronology
All-Time Greatest Hits (2015)	Today Is Christmas (2015)	Remnants (2016)

Today Is Christmas is the fourteenth studio album and second Christmas album by American singer LeAnn Rimes. Released in 2015, it features holiday classics and two original songs co-written by Rimes. The album has sold 35,700 copies in the United States as of January 2016.

== Track listing ==
No.	Title	Writer(s)	Length
1.	"Today Is Christmas" (Holiday Theme for NBC's Today)	Darrell Brown; Rimes	3:22
2.	"We Need a Little Christmas"	Jerry Herman	3:00
3.	"That Spirit of Christmas" (duet with Aloe Blacc)	Parnell Davison; Mable John; Joel Webster	4:55
4.	"I Still Believe in Santa Claus"	Brown; Rimes	3:07
5.	"Holly Jolly Christmas/Frosty the Snowman"	Johnny Marks; Walter E. Rollins; Steve Nelson	2:12
6.	"Celebrate Me Home" (duet with Gavin DeGraw)	Bob James; Kenny Loggins	4:14
7.	"Must Be Santa"	Bill Fredericks; Hal Moore	2:47
8.	"Christmas Time Is Here"	Vince Guaraldi; Lee Mendelson	1:55
9.	"The Heartache Can Wait"	Brandi Carlile; Phil Hanseroth	3:50
10.	"Little Drummer Boy"	Katherine K. Davis; Henry Onorati; Harry Simeone	4:25
11.	"Joy (God Rest Ye Merry Gentlemen/Angels We Have Heard on High/Hark the Herald Angels Sing)"	Brown; Rimes	4:46
12.	"Auld Lang Syne"	Robert Burns	1:55
Total length:			40:28

Target exclusive bonus tracks
No.	Title	Writer(s)	Length
13.	"Ring Them Bells"	Bob Dylan	3:06
14.	"Pretty Paper"	Willie Nelson	2:27
15.	"Happy Xmas (War Is Over)"	John Lennon; Yoko Ono	3:14
Total length:			49:15

== Personnel ==
Musicians

- LeAnn Rimes – vocals, arrangements and adaptation (11, 12)
- Booker T. Jones – Hammond B3 organ (1–7, 9), Wurlitzer electric piano (1–7)
- Rob Arthur – upright piano (2, 4, 8), Hammond B3 organ (10)
- Jim Cox – upright piano (6, 9)
- Dave Audé – keyboards (11)
- Darrell Brown – keyboards (11), arrangements and adaptation (11, 12)
- Tariqh Akuni – acoustic guitar (1), guitars (5)
- Ray Parker Jr. – guitars (2–4, 6–10)
- Willie Weeks – bass (1, 3, 5–7, 9)
- Bob Glaub – bass (2, 4, 8, 10)
- James Gadson – drums (1, 5)
- Steve Ferrone – drums (3, 6, 7)
- Vinnie Colaiuta – drums (4, 8, 10), snare drum (11), toms (11)
- Ron Dzuibla – baritone saxophone (1, 3, 4, 7), tenor saxophone (1, 3, 4, 7)
- Lee Thornburg – trombone (1, 3), trumpet (1, 3, 4, 7), horn arrangements (1, 3, 4, 7)
- Nick Lane – trombone (3, 4, 7)
- Steve Richards – cello (2, 9)
- Suzie Katayama – string arrangements (2, 9)

Background and guest vocalists

- LeAnn Rimes – backing vocals (1–8, 10, 11)
- Darrell Brown – backing vocals (1, 3–5, 11)
- Tim Davis – backing vocals (2, 4, 5, 11)
- Aloe Blacc – vocals (3), backing vocals (3)
- Summer Davis – backing vocals (3)
- Gavin DeGraw – vocals (6), backing vocals (6)
- Ryan Bast – backing vocals (7)
- Deborah Lippman – backing vocals (7)

Production

- Darrell Brown – producer
- LeAnn Rimes – producer
- Niko Bolas – producer (1–10, 12)
- Dave Audé – producer (11)
- Cindi Peters – production coordinator
- Kiki Caldas – production assistant
- Abby Littman – production intern
- Donny Phillips – design
- Sara Hertel – photography
- Sarah Stein – stylist
- Nathaniel Hawkins – hair, make-up
- Troy Surratt – hair, make-up
- Marcel Pariseau and Sara Shillingslaw for True Public Relations – publicity
- Brad Bissell and Rod Essiq for Creative Artist Agency – booking agents

Technical credits

- Ian Sefchick – mastering at Capitol Mastering (Hollywood, California)
- Niko Bolas – recording, mixing
- Al Schmitt – mixing
- Shamus Bacon – additional engineer
- Darrell Brown – additional engineer, editing (11)
- Will Delaney – additional engineer
- Steve Genewick – additional engineer
- Chandler Harrod – additional engineer
- Jeremy Miller – additional engineer
- Ernesto Olvera – additional engineer
- Nick Rives – additional engineer
- Diego Ruelas – additional engineer
- Morgan Stratton – additional engineer
- Joshua Stuebe – additional engineer
- Josh White – additional engineer
- Dave Audé – editing (11)
- Paul Jamieson – bass and drum equipment rentals and cartage

== Celebrate Me Home ==
Celebrate Me Home promo single according to Mediabase radio charts reached #2 on the Holiday Radio Play chart and #7 on Adult Contemporary chart. The Video for Celebrate Me Home was created as a Facebook awareness video for Disabled American Veterans and proved to be a great success with over 5.6 million native views as of January 2016.

== Chart performance ==
=== Weekly charts ===
Chart (2015)	Peak position
US Billboard 200	88
US Top Country Albums (Billboard)	9
US Top Holiday Albums (Billboard)	2
US Independent Albums (Billboard)	2

=== Year-end charts ===
Chart (2016)	Position
US Top Country Albums (Billboard)	65
