= We Can (song) =

Single by LeAnn Rimes

from the album Legally Blonde 2: Red, White & Blonde – Motion Picture Soundtrack
- Released: June 16, 2003
- Recorded: 2003; Henson Recording Studios (Hollywood, CA); Emerald Sound Studios (Nashville, TN)
- Genre: Pop rock
- Length: 3:37
- Label: Asylum-Curb
- Songwriter: Diane Warren
- Producer: Dann Huff

LeAnn Rimes singles chronology
"Suddenly" (2003)	"We Can" (2003)	"This Love" (2003)

Music video
- "We Can" on YouTube

"We Can" is the twenty-fourth single recorded by American country pop singer LeAnn Rimes, released on June 16, 2003, by Asylum-Curb Records from the Legally Blonde 2: Red, White & Blonde – Motion Picture Soundtrack (2003). It was penned by Diane Warren and produced by Dann Huff. It would also be included on both 2003's Greatest Hits and 2004's The Best of LeAnn Rimes. It is an empowerment song about how people can do the impossible.

The song entered two Billboard charts, peaking at number 17 on the Adult Contemporary chart and number 19 on the Dance Club Songs chart. Internationally, the song peaked at number 27 on the UK Singles Chart while also entering the charts in Ireland and New Zealand.

Two videos were released for the single, both of which were directed by Liz Friedlander. The first features scenes from its parent film Legally Blonde 2: Red, White & Blonde, while the second replaces the scenes with actors. The film version was included in the DVD version of the film while the other was included on the DVD Greatest Hits.

== Background ==
"We Can" and a remix of the song was first released on the Legally Blonde 2: Red, White & Blonde – Motion Picture Soundtrack, on July 1, 2003, by Curb Records. It was released as a single from the soundtrack on October 28, 2003, by Curb Records. The song was later included on Rimes' Greatest Hits album, which was released on November 18, 2003. In 2004, the song was included on The Best of LeAnn Rimes and the Wildlife Radio Edit of the song was released on the remix edition. It is the third time Rimes worked with American songwriter Diane Warren on a soundtrack.

== Composition ==
"We Can" (2003)
A twenty-eight second sample of Rimes' "We Can", from the Legally Blonde 2: Red, White & Blonde – Motion Picture Soundtrack. Sample features the chorus of the song.

"We Can" is a pop rock song of three minutes and thirty-seven seconds. The song is written by American Grammy Award–winning songwriter Diane Warren, and performed by American country pop singer LeAnn Rimes. The song is written in the key of E major with Rimes' vocals spanning two octaves, from E_{3} to E_{5}. According to Rimes, the song is about "a testament to the power of working for a common goal."

== Promotion ==
Rimes made several TV appearances to promote the song, including Good Morning America on June 27, 2003, The View on July 2, 2003, "Boston Pops Fireworks Spectacular" on July 4, 2003, and The Tonight Show with Jay Leno on July 14, 2003.

== Critical reception ==
Matt Bjorke of About.com complimented Rimes' for her vocals stating that Rimes is "sounding better than she ever has, and the song fit so well in the movie Legally Blonde 2 that it became the end credits song." Heather Phares of AllMusic called it "pleasant but slightly bland girl-power anthem." Lydia Vanderloo of Barnes & Noble.com praised the song stating it's "an effervescent, chart-worthy tune on which Rimes insists that, against all odds, "We can do the impossible!"" Carla Hay of Billboard magazine wrote that "Curb Records is banking on LeAnn Rimes to be a triple-crown soundtracks winner."

== Chart performance ==
In the US the song peaked at number 16 on the Billboard Adult Contemporary Charts. The song also peaked at number 19 on the Billboard Hot Dance Club Play.

Internationally the song charted at number 37 on the IRMA. It also charted at number 94 on the Netherlands' Mega Single Top 100 chart, number 40 on the RIANZ and 27 on the UK's Official Charts Company.

== Music video ==
Two music videos were released for the song. Both videos contains clips of Rimes singing on the hood of a bright-pink car, in front of a pink star design, wearing a blue tanktop and striped skirt, and in front of a pink open-book design lit up like a heart, wearing a pink tanktop and a fluffy yellow skirt. One version of the video contains scenes taken from the film. The second version of the video portrays actors, one in an office, another in a truck, one as a waitress, a cheerleader and a business man. The actress in the office is being yelled at by her boss over her copies being on pink printer paper, the guy in the vintage truck is a farm-boy stuck in a corporate traffic jam, the waitress has a secret crush on the cook, the cheerleader wants to play football and the business man is getting a haircut. At the end of the video, the actress in the office walks away from her boss and throws the copies into the air, the young farmer in the truck starts walking instead of waiting for the traffic jam to move, the waitress kisses the cook, the cheerleader runs out and tackles the quarterback and scores a touchdown, and the business man ends up with a blue Mohawk. The version featuring clips taken from the film was included as a bonus feature on the DVD for the film. The one featuring the clips with the actors was included on the limited edition bonus DVD that came with the original release of Rimes' Greatest Hits album. The music video was shot in Los Angeles and directed by Liz Friedlander.

== Track listing ==
US/UK Remix digital download

1. "We Can" (Widelife Radio Edit) – 3:49
2. "We Can" (Widelife Mixshow Edit) – 6:56
3. "We Can" (Widelife Extended Club) – 10:08
4. "We Can" (Brownleewe & Bose Radio Edit) – 4:08
5. "We Can" (Brownleewe & Bose Extended Mix) – 5:37
6. "We Can" (Tee's Freeze Radio Edit) – 3:37
7. "We Can" (Tee's Freeze Extended Mix) – 8:05
8. "We Can" (Tee's Freeze Dub) – 6:35
9. "We Can" (Piper Extended Club Mix) – 9:05

US 12" vinyl

- A "We Can" (Widelife Extended Club) – 10:08
- B1 "We Can" (Tee's Freeze Dub) – 6:35
- B2 "We Can" (Wildlife Mixshow Edit) – 6:56
- C "We Can" (Tee's Freeze Extended Mix) – 8:05
- D1 "We Can" (Widelife Dub) – 7:38
- D2 "We Can" (Brownleewe & Bose Extended Mix) – 5:37

UK CD single

1. "We Can" (Album Version) – 3:37
2. "We Can" (Widelife Radio Edit) – 3:49
3. "We Can" (Tee's Freeze Radio Edit) – 3:37
4. "We Can" (Brownleewe & Bose Radio Edit) – 4:08
- "We Can" Music Video

UK Promotional CD single

1. "We Can" – 3:37

European CD single

1. "We Can" (Album Version) – 3:37
2. "We Can" (Widelife Radio Edit) – 3:49
3. "We Can" (Tee's Freeze Radio Edit) – 3:37
4. "We Can" (Brownleewe & Bose Radio Edit) – 4:08
5. "We Can" (American Mix) – 3:36

German CD single

1. "We Can" (Album Version) – 3:37
2. "We Can" (Brownleewe & Bose Radio Edit) – 4:08

Australian Maxi Single

1. "We Can" (Album Version) – 3:37
2. "We Can" (Tee's Freeze Radio Edit) – 3:37
3. "We Can" (Widelife Radio Edit) – 3:49
4. "We Can" (American Mix) – 3:36

== Charts ==
=== Weekly charts ===
Chart performance for "We Can"
Chart (2003)	Peak position
Australia (ARIA)	51
Ireland (IRMA)	37
Netherlands (Mega Single Top 100)	94
New Zealand (Recorded Music NZ)	40
UK Singles (Official Charts)	27
US Adult Contemporary (Billboard)	16
US Hot Dance Club Songs (Billboard)	19

=== Year-end charts ===
Chart (2003)	Position
US Adult Contemporary (Radio & Records)	42

== Release history ==
Release dates and format(s) for "We Can"
Region	Date	Format(s)	Label(s)	Ref.
United States	June 16, 2003	Contemporary hit radio; Adult contemporary radio; Hot adult contemporary radio	Asylum-Curb	
United States	October 28, 2003	Digital remixes EP	Asylum-Curb	
