= Feels Like Home (LeAnn Rimes song) =

Single by LeAnn Rimes

from the album Sittin' on Top of the World
- Released: October 3, 1998
- Genre: Country
- Length: 4:30
- Label: Curb
- Songwriter(s): Diane Warren
- Producer(s): Wilbur C. Rimes

LeAnn Rimes singles chronology
"Nothin' New Under the Moon" (1998)	"Feels Like Home" (1998)	"These Arms of Mine" (1998)

"Feels Like Home" is a song by LeAnn Rimes from her studio album, Sittin' on Top of the World. The single was released on October 3, 1998. The song peaked at number seventeen on the Billboard Adult Contemporary chart.

== Personnel ==
Credits for "Feels Like Home" adapted from the liner notes of Sittin' on Top of the World.

- Wilbur C. Rimes – producer
- Cal Albrecht – percussion
- Gary Leach – keyboard, background vocals
- Debi Lee – background vocals
- Curtis Randall – bass
- LeAnn Rimes – primary artist, background vocals
- Wilbur C. Rimes – producer
- Marty Walsh – acoustic guitar, electric guitar
- Matthew Ward – background vocals
- Diane Warren – songwriter
- Dan Wojiechowski – drums

== Chart ==
Chart performance for "Feels Like Home"
Chart (1998)	Peak position
US Adult Contemporary (Billboard)	17
