= Commitment (LeAnn Rimes song) =

- UK CD cover

Single by LeAnn Rimes

from the album Sittin' on Top of the World
- A-side: "Looking Through Your Eyes"
- Released: March 16, 1998
- Recorded: 1998
- Genre: Country pop; pop rock
- Length: 4:37
- Label: Curb
- Songwriters: Tony Colton; Tony Marty; Bobby Wood
- Producer: Wilbur C. Rimes

LeAnn Rimes singles chronology
"On the Side of Angels" (1998)	"Commitment" (1998)	"Looking Through Your Eyes" (1998)

"Commitment" is a song written by Tony Colton, Tony Marty and Bobby Wood, and recorded by American country music artist LeAnn Rimes. It was released on March 16, 1998, as the lead single from her album Sittin' on Top of the World. In most parts of the world, "Commitment" was released as a double A-side with "Looking Through Your Eyes".

The song peaked at number 4 on the US country charts and at number 38 in the UK. It was later included on Rimes's compilations Greatest Hits (2003) and its international counterpart The Best of LeAnn Rimes (2004).

== Background ==
In most parts of the world, "Commitment" was released as a double A-side with "Looking Through Your Eyes". "Looking Through Your Eyes" was intended for pop radio, while "Commitment" was sent to country radio. In Australia, the song was released as a maxi single featuring several remixes of her previous hit, "How Do I Live".

== Track listing ==
Australian CD

1. "Commitment" – 4:37
2. "How Do I Live" (Mr Mig Remix) (Dance Radio Edit) – 3:55
3. "How Do I Live" (Mr Mig Remix) (Club Radio Edit) – 4:15
4. "How Do I Live" (RH Factor Radio Edit) – 3:48
5. "How Do I Live" (Mr Mig Remix) (Club Mix) – 7:40
6. "How Do I Live" (Original Extended Mix) – 4:58

UK CD2

1. "Commitment" – 4:37
2. "Looking Through Your Eyes" – 4:05
3. "One Way Ticket (Because I Can)" – 3:42

== Charts ==
=== Weekly charts ===
Weekly chart performance for "Commitment"
Chart (1998)	Peak position
Australia (ARIA) with "How Do I Live" (Remixes)	59
Canada Country Singles (RPM)	4
UK Singles (Official Charts) with "Looking Through Your Eyes"	38
US Hot Country Songs (Billboard)	4
US Top Country Singles Sales (Billboard)	2

=== Year-end charts ===
Year-end chart performance for "Commitment"
Chart (1998)	Position
Canada Country Tracks (RPM)	39
US Country Songs (Billboard)	33

== Certifications ==
Certifications for "Commitment"
Region	Certification	Certified units/sales
United States (RIAA)	Gold	500,000^{^}
^{^} Shipments figures based on certification alone.

== Release history ==
Release dates and format(s) for "Commitment"
Region	Date	Format(s)	Label(s)	Ref.
United States	March 16, 1998	Country radio	Curb	
