= These Arms of Mine (LeAnn Rimes song) =

Single by LeAnn Rimes

from the album Sittin' on Top of the World
- Released: November 21, 1998
- Genre: Country
- Length: 4:30
- Label: Curb
- Songwriters: Gail Thompson; Jeff Tweel
- Producer: Wilbur C. Rimes

LeAnn Rimes singles chronology
"Feels Like Home" (1998)	"These Arms of Mine" (1998)	"Written in the Stars" (1999)

"These Arms of Mine" is a song by American country singer LeAnn Rimes, released as the final single from her third studio album, Sittin' on Top of the World. The song was released to radio on November 21, 1998.

== Critical response ==
Chuck Taylor of Billboard wrote a positive review of the song complimenting Rimes' vocal performance, comparing the song to her lead single "Blue", calling the song just as "passionately delivered and altogether satisfy" and a "beautifully written traditional-drenched song". Stephen Thomas Erlewine wrote, when reviewing the album, that the song hardly felt like a country song despite its use of steel guitars.

== Commercial performance ==
The song also peaked at number 52 on Canada's RPM Country Single chart. In the US, the song peaked at number 41 on the Billboard Hot Country Songs chart.

== Personnel ==
Credits adapted from the liner notes of Sittin' on Top of the World.

- Wilbur C. Rimes – producer
- Dan Wojciechowski – drums
- Bob Gentry – bass
- Milo Dearing – acoustic guitar, electric guitar, steel guitar, fiddle
- Randy Fouts – piano
- Gary Leach – background vocals
- Rita Baloche – background vocals
- Terry Casburn – background vocals
- Gail Thompson – songwriter
- Jeff Tweel – songwriter

== Charts ==
Chart performance for "These Arms of Mine"
Chart (1998)	Peak position
Canada Country Tracks (RPM)	52
US Hot Country Songs (Billboard)	41
