= Sittin' on Top of the World (LeAnn Rimes album) =

Studio album by LeAnn Rimes
- Released: May 5, 1998
- Recorded: 1997
- Studios: Rosewood Studio (Tyler, Texas)
- Genres: Adult contemporary; country; pop
- Length: 60:12
- Label: Curb
- Producer: Wilbur C. Rimes

LeAnn Rimes chronology
You Light Up My Life: Inspirational Songs (1997)	Sittin' on Top of the World (1998)	LeAnn Rimes (1999)

Singles from Sittin' on Top of the World
- 1. "Commitment" Released: March 16, 1998; 2. "Looking Through Your Eyes" Released: March 24, 1998; 3. "Nothin' New Under the Moon" Released: July 14, 1998; 4. "Feels Like Home" Released: October 3, 1998; 5. "These Arms of Mine" Released: November 21, 1998

Sittin' on Top of the World is the fifth studio album by American singer LeAnn Rimes, released in the United States on May 5, 1998, by Curb Records. The album comprises new material alongside several cover songs. It was preceded by the singles "Looking Through Your Eyes" and Commitment".

The album received generally negative to mixed reviews from music critics, who criticized the album's production and selection of material. In the United States, the album peaked at number 3 on the Billboard 200 has been certified platinum.

== Background ==
The album includes the singles "Looking Through Your Eyes", "Commitment", "Nothin' New Under the Moon", "These Arms of Mine", and "Feels Like Home". It also contains cover versions of "Insensitive" by Jann Arden, "Sittin' on Top of the World" by Amanda Marshall, "Purple Rain" by Prince, "Undeniable" and "Rock Me (In the Cradle of Love)" by Deborah Allen.

International and UK editions of Sittin' on Top of the World include her previous hit, "How Do I Live"; the latter also includes her first hit, "Blue".

== Critical reception ==
Professional ratings
Review scores
Source	Rating
AllMusic	2.5/5 stars
Entertainment Weekly	C
Robert Christgau	C+
Rolling Stone	3/5 stars
The Rolling Stone Album Guide	1/5 stars

Sittin' on Top of the World received generally negative to mixed reviews from music critics. Much like her previous record, most criticism was given to the album's production and selection of material. Stephen Thomas Erlewine of AllMusic described the album's production by Wilbur Rimes as "overarranged" and Alanna Nash of Entertainment Weekly described his production style as "often squeezing as many instruments as possible onto a track without leaving any breathing room." While Rimes's vocal abilities were praised, both reviewers noted that a number of songs on the album were "oversung".

Many critics felt that the included cover songs were inappropriate for Rimes. In particular, her cover of "Purple Rain" (originally by Prince) was critically panned. Alanna Nash called it "unlistenable", describing her performance as "both ridiculous and totally unbelievable". Both Stephen Erlewine and Robert Christgau specifically singled it out as inappropriate for Rimes; Shirley Jinkins of the Fort Worth Star-Telegram described it as a "misfire". In a more positive review, James Hunter of Rolling Stone described the cover as "neither travesty nor triumph; it's just earnestly delivered". Erlewine concluded that Rimes's "gifts and personality surface just often enough to make you realize that this blandly pleasant album could have been much, much better".

== Commercial performance ==
Sittin' on Top of the World debuted at number 4 on the Billboard 200 in its first week with 156,500 copies sold; it peaked at number 3 in its second week. The album spent 3 weeks in the top 10 and 37 weeks in the Billboard 200.

== Track listing ==
Sittin' on Top of the World track listing
No.	Title	Writer(s)	Length
1.	"Commitment"	Tony Colton; Tony Marty; Bobby Wood	4:37
2.	"Looking Through Your Eyes" (From the Quest for Camelot Motion Picture)	David Foster; Carole Bayer Sager	4:05
3.	"Undeniable"	Deborah Allen; Rafe Van Hoy	3:44
4.	"Feels Like Home"	Diane Warren	4:30
5.	"Surrender"	Robin Lee Bruce; Christi Dannemiller; Jamie O'Neal	4:06
6.	"These Arms of Mine"	Gail Thompson; Jeff Tweel	2:57
7.	"Nothin' New Under the Moon"	Rick Bowles; Josh Leo; Tom Shapiro	3:31
8.	"When Am I Gonna Get Over You"	John Tirro; Bryan White	3:27
9.	"Rock Me"	Allen; Van Hoy	3:42
10.	"More Than Anyone Deserves"	Rimes; Ron Grimes	4:19
11.	"Insensitive"	Anne Loree	4:19
12.	"All the Lovin' and Hurtin'"	Allen; Van Hoy	3:57
13.	"Sittin' on Top of the World"	Amanda Marshall	4:15
14.	"The Heart Never Forgets"	Gary Baker; Frank J. Myers; Jerry Williams	3:52
15.	"Purple Rain"	Prince	4:52
Total length:			60:12

UK edition
No.	Title	Writer(s)	Length
1.	"Blue"	Bill Mack	2:47
2.	"How Do I Live"	Warren	5:05
Total length:			68:07

International edition
No.	Title	Writer(s)	Length
1.	"How Do I Live" (Extended Mix)	Warren	4:56
Total length:			65:13

== Personnel ==
Compiled from liner notes.

- LeAnn Rimes – lead vocals, backing vocals (4, 5, 8, 11, 13), percussion (9)
- Steve Nathan – keyboards (1)
- Gary Leach – keyboards (1, 2, 4, 5, 10, 11, 13, 14), backing vocals (1–7, 9, 10, 12, 13, 14), acoustic piano (3, 9, 13, 14), acoustic guitar (13), arrangements
- Kelly Glenn – keyboards (3, 8, 15), acoustic piano (7), backing vocals (15)
- Randy Fouts – acoustic piano (6, 12)
- Marty Walsh – electric guitar (1, 3, 4, 5, 7, 8, 9, 11, 13, 14), acoustic guitar (1, 4, 5, 7, 9, 14)
- Glynn Flemming – electric guitar (2, 15)
- Jerry Metheny – electric guitar (2, 7, 9, 11, 13, 15), acoustic guitar (3, 10)
- Milo Deering – acoustic guitar (1, 2, 6, 8, 11–15), mandolin (5), steel guitar (5–8, 12, 14), electric guitar (6, 12), fiddle (6, 8, 10), dobro (10)
- Kevin Bailey – acoustic guitar (3, 10)
- Junior Knight – acoustic guitar (3), steel guitar (9)
- Curtis Randall – bass (1–5, 7–11, 13, 14, 15), backing vocals (9, 15)
- Bob Gentry – bass (6, 12), assisting arrangements
- Dan Wojciechowski – drums
- Carl Albrecht – percussion (1, 4, 5, 10, 11, 13)
- Fred Glieber – percussion (3, 7)
- Greg Hunt – assisting arrangements
- Wilbur C. Rimes – assisting arrangements
- Perry Coleman – backing vocals (1, 5, 13, 14)
- Chastity Marie – backing vocals (1, 5, 14)
- Stephanie Marie – backing vocals (1, 5, 14)
- Rita Baloche – backing vocals (3, 6, 7, 10, 12)
- Debi Lee – backing vocals (3, 4, 7, 10)
- Matthew Ward – backing vocals (3, 4, 7, 10)
- Terry Casburn – backing vocals (6, 12)
- Bryan White – backing vocals (8)

== Production ==
- Wilbur C. Rimes – producer, mixing
- Greg Hunt – chief engineer, mixing, mastering
- Austin Deptula – assistant engineer, editing
- Gary Leach – assistant engineer, mixing, editing
- J. B. Patterson – assistant engineer
- Doug Sax – mastering
- The Mastering Lab (Hollywood, California) – mastering location
- Sue Allen – design coordinator
- Glenn Sweitzer and Fresh Design – art direction, design
- Andrew Eccles – photography
- Trish Townsend – wardrobe stylist
- Debra Wingo – hair stylist, make-up

== Charts ==
=== Weekly charts ===
Weekly chart performance for Sittin' on Top of the World
Chart (1998–99)	Peak position
Australian Albums (ARIA)	42
Austrian Albums (Ö3 Austria)	28
Canada Top Albums/CDs (RPM)	15
Canadian Country Albums (RPM)	2
Dutch Albums (Album Top 100)	27
European Albums (European Top 100 Albums)	76
German Albums (Offizielle Top 100)	42
Japanese Albums (Oricon)	69
Swiss Albums (Schweizer Hitparade)	34
UK Albums (Official Charts)	11
US Billboard 200	3
US Top Country Albums (Billboard)	2

=== Year end-chart ===
Chart (1998)	Position
Canadian Top Albums/CDs (RPM)	93
Canadian Country Albums (RPM)	7
US Billboard 200	69
US Top Country Albums (Billboard)	10
Chart (1999)	Position
US Top Country Albums (Billboard)	35

=== Certifications ===
Region	Certification	Certified units/sales
Australia (ARIA)	Gold	35,000^{^}
Canada (Music Canada)	Platinum	100,000^{^}
United Kingdom (BPI)	Gold	100,000^{^}
United States (RIAA)	Platinum	1,000,000^{^}
^{^} Shipments figures based on certification alone.
