= On the Side of Angels =

Single by LeAnn Rimes

from the album You Light Up My Life: Inspirational Songs
- Released: October 11, 1997
- Genre: Country
- Length: 3:49
- Label: Curb
- Songwriters: Gary Burr, Gerry House
- Producer: Wilbur C. Rimes

LeAnn Rimes singles chronology
"You Light Up My Life" (1997)	"On the Side of Angels" (1997)	"Commitment" (1998)

"On the Side of Angels" is a song written by Gary Burr and Gerry House, and recorded by American country music artist LeAnn Rimes. It was released in October 1997 as the third and final single from her album You Light Up My Life: Inspirational Songs. It was also later featured on her Greatest Hits (2003) album.

"On the Side of Angels" was featured in the 1997 TV movie Holiday in Your Heart, which starred Rimes herself.

== Charts ==
Chart (1997–1998)	Peak position
Canada Country Singles (RPM)	9
US Hot Country Songs (Billboard)	4

=== Year-end charts ===
Chart (1998)	Position
US Country Songs (Billboard)	65
