= Big Deal (song) =

Single by LeAnn Rimes

from the album LeAnn Rimes
- B-side: "Leaving's Not Leaving"
- Released: September 7, 1999
- Recorded: 1998
- Genre: Country
- Length: 3:08
- Label: Curb
- Songwriters: Jeffrey Steele; Al Anderson
- Producer: Wilbur C. Rimes

LeAnn Rimes singles chronology
"Written in the Stars" (1999)	"Big Deal" (1999)	"Cattle Call" (1999)

Audio sample
- file; help

"Big Deal" (stylized as "BIG Deal") is a song written by Jeffrey Steele and Al Anderson and recorded by American country music artist LeAnn Rimes. The song was produced by her father Wilbur C. Rimes. It was released on September 7, 1999, as the lead single from her eponymous fourth studio album through Curb Records. It was also the only original song included in the album.

The song became a commercial success, peaking at number six on the US Hot Country Songs chart and number 23 on the Billboard Hot 100. The B-side track, "Leaving's Not Leaving," was released on the soundtrack for the film, Anywhere But Here on November 2, 1999.

== Content ==
"Big Deal" details the singer bitterly telling off a friend who's madly in love with and happily dating the singer's ex.

== Track listing ==
CD/Cassette tape Single

1. "Big Deal"* (Al Anderson, Jeffrey Steele) — 3:05
2. "Leaving's Not Leaving"** (Diane Warren) — 4:53

* Note: Produced by Wilbur C. Rimes.
** Note: Produced by Don Was and Wilbur C. Rimes.

== Chart positions ==
Chart (1999–2000)	Peak position
Canada Country Singles (RPM)	3
US Billboard Hot 100	23
US Hot Country Songs (Billboard)	6
US Top Country Singles Sales (Billboard)	1

=== Year-end charts ===
Chart (1999)	Position
Canada Country Tracks (RPM)	70

Chart (2000)	Position
US Country Songs (Billboard)	54

== Release history ==
Release dates and format(s) for "Big Deal"
Region	Date	Format(s)	Label(s)	Ref.
United States	September 7, 1999	Country radio	Curb	
United States	September 28, 1999	CD; cassette single	Curb	
