= You Light Up My Life: Inspirational Songs =

Studio album by LeAnn Rimes
- Released: September 9, 1997
- Recorded: 1996−1997
- Studios: Rosewood Studio (Tyler); McClain Studios (Dallas); Starstruck Studios (Nashville); KD Studios (Nashville); Curb Studios (Nashville); Barking Dog Studios (New York)
- Genres: Adult contemporary; country; pop
- Length: 43:33
- Label: Curb
- Producers: Wilbur C. Rimes; Mike Curb; Chuck Howard

LeAnn Rimes chronology
| Unchained Melody: The Early Years (1997) | You Light Up My Life: Inspirational Songs (1997) | Sittin' on Top of the World (1998) |

Singles from You Light Up My Life: Inspirational Songs
- 1. "How Do I Live" Released: May 23, 1997; 2. "You Light Up My Life" Released: August 26, 1997; 3. "On the Side of Angels" Released: October 11, 1997

You Light Up My Life: Inspirational Songs, or simply You Light Up My Life, is the fourth studio album by the American country singer LeAnn Rimes. Released in the United States by Curb Records on September 9, 1997, when Rimes was 15 years old, it followed her third album and major label debut Blue (1996). The album comprises several covers of pop standards alongside original material.

The album was a commercial success but received generally negative to mixed reviews from critics, who criticized its production. When the album topped the Billboard 200, Rimes became the third artist under eighteen to have had two albums reach number one on the chart. You Light Up My Life: Inspirational Songs was certified 4× Platinum by the RIAA.

== Singles ==
Three singles were released from the album. The first was "How Do I Live." The single was highly successful, peaking at number 2 on the Billboard Hot 100 in the United States and being certified 4 times Platinum. In the UK, it peaked at number 7, spending 30 weeks on the UK Top 40 singles chart and ranking as the sixth highest selling single on the UK year-end chart for 1998.

The album's second single, "You Light Up My Life", peaked at number 34 and was certified gold in the United States. The third and final single released from the album, "On the Side of Angels", peaked at number 4 on the US Country Chart.

== Critical reception ==
Professional ratings
Review scores
| Source | Rating |
|---|---|
| AllMusic | 3/5 stars |
| Robert Christgau | (dud) |
| Entertainment Weekly | C− |
| The Rolling Stone Album Guide | 1/5 stars |

You Light Up My Life: Inspirational Songs received generally negative to mixed reviews from music critics. Most criticism was given to the album's production. Writing for The Rolling Stone Album Guide, Arion Berger described the album as "an incoherent mess of western fluff and overblown ballads". Berger went on saying that "many of the songs are quite fine, but the arrangements are poisoned with bad decisions". David Browne from Entertainment Weekly felt that the covers on the album did little to distinguish from the original songs.

Criticism was also given to the album for being more adult contemporary than her previous record, Blue. Browne said that the album's "arrangements forsake the sleek honky-tonk of Blue for gloppy adult contemporary". Thom Owens from AllMusic described the album as having "a bland, homogenous quality" that "could have used a bit of country grit". He praised "How Do I Live" and went on to say that the album was "far from disastrous", opining that "Rimes has too much natural talent to be sunk by poorly chosen material".

== Commercial performance ==
You Light Up My Life: Inspirational Songs debuted at number one on Billboard 200 with 186,000 copies sold in its first week, the album dropped to number two in its second week but with a 10% increase with sales of 204,500. It returned to number one in its sixth week with 131,500 copies sold. The album spent 13 weeks in the top 5, 17 weeks in the top 10 and a total of 55 weeks in Billboard 200. You Light Up My Life: Inspirational Songs was certified 4× Platinum by RIAA, denoting shipments of over 4 million copies.

== Track listing ==
All tracks produced by Wilbur C. Rimes, except where noted.

You Light Up My Life: Inspirational Songs track listing
| No. | Title | Writer(s) | Producer(s) | Length |
|---|---|---|---|---|
| 1. | "You Light Up My Life" | Joe Brooks | Wilbur C. Rimes; Chuck Howard; Mike Curb | 3:37 |
| 2. | "The Rose" | Amanda McBroom | | 3:33 |
| 3. | "Bridge Over Troubled Water" | Paul Simon | | 4:40 |
| 4. | "I Believe" | Ervin Drake; Irvin Graham; Jimmy Shirl; Al Stillman | | 2:22 |
| 5. | "Ten Thousand Angels Cried" | David Patillo | | 3:59 |
| 6. | "Clinging to a Saving Hand" | Bill Mack | | 2:44 |
| 7. | "On the Side of Angels" | Gary Burr; Gerry House | | 3:49 |
| 8. | "I Know Who Holds Tomorrow" | Ira Stanphill | | 4:41 |
| 9. | "God Bless America" | Irving Berlin | | 3:06 |
| 10. | "How Do I Live" (Extended Mix) | Diane Warren | W. Rimes; Howard; Curb | 4:57 |
| 11. | "Amazing Grace" | John Newton | | 4:06 |
| 12. | "National Anthem" | Francis Scott Key | | 1:59 |
| Total length: | | | | 43:33 |

Japanese bonus track
| No. | Title | Writer(s) | Producer(s) | Length |
|---|---|---|---|---|
| 12. | "How Do I Live" (Mr. Mig Remix) | Warren | W. Rimes; Howard; Curb; Mr. Mig^{[a]} | 3:54 |

Notes

- ^a signifies a remixer

== Personnel ==
Credits adapted from You Light Up My Life: Inspirational Songs liner notes.

Musicians

- LeAnn Rimes – lead vocals
- Kelly Glenn – keyboards
- Jimmy Kelly – keyboards
- Steve Nathan – keyboards
- Jerry Matheny – electric guitars
- John Willis – electric guitars
- Milo Deering – acoustic guitars, steel guitar, fiddle
- Michael Spriggs – acoustic guitars
- Paul Franklin – steel guitar
- Bob Gentry – bass
- Curtis Randall – bass, backing vocals
- Michael Rhodes – bass
- Fred Gleber – drums
- Greg Morrow – drums
- Dan Wojciechowski — drums
- Michael Black – backing vocals
- Mary Ann Kennedy – backing vocals
- Gary Leach – backing vocals
- Pam Rose – backing vocals
- Dennis Willson – backing vocals

Production

- Wilbur C. Rimes – producer, management
- Mike Curb – producer (1, 10)
- Chuck Howard – producer (1, 10)
- Greg Hunt – recording, mixing
- Mike McClain – recording, mixing
- Bob Campbell-Smith – additional recording, BGV recording, mixing (1, 10, 11)
- Csaba Pectoz – overdub engineer
- Mick Guzauski – mixing (10)
- Scott Ahaus – additional recording, recording assistant, assistant overdub engineer, mix assistant (10)
- David Boyer – additional recording, recording assistant
- Daniel Kresco – additional recording, recording assistant, assistant overdub engineer
- Gary Leach – recording assistant, mix assistant
- Jim Rogers – additional recording, recording assistant
- Jeff Watkins – additional recording, recording assistant, BGV recording assistant
- David Hall – assistant overdub engineer
- Glenn Meadows – mastering at Masterfonics (Nashville, Tennessee)
- Lesley Albert – project coordinator
- Sue Austin – album design coordinator
- Frank Lucero – art direction, design
- Neuman, Walker & Associates, Inc. – art direction, design
- John Chiasson – photography
- Lyle Walker – management

== Charts and certifications ==
=== Weekly charts ===
Weekly chart performance for You Light Up My Life: Inspirational Songs
| Chart (1997–98) | Peak position |
|---|---|
| Australian Albums (ARIA) | 12 |
| Canada Top Albums/CDs (RPM) | 13 |
| Canadian Country Albums (RPM) | 1 |
| New Zealand Albums (RMNZ) | 41 |
| UK Albums (OCC) | 170 |
| UK Country Albums (Official Charts) | 1 |
| US Billboard 200 | 1 |
| US Top Country Albums (Billboard) | 1 |
| US Top Christian Albums (Billboard) | 1 |

=== Decade-end chart ===
| Chart (1990–1999) | Position |
|---|---|
| US Billboard 200 | 78 |

=== Year-end charts ===
| Chart (1997) | Position |
|---|---|
| Australian Albums (ARIA) | 59 |
| Canadian Country Albums (RPM) | 15 |
| US Billboard 200 | 31 |
| US Top Country Albums (Billboard) | 6 |
| Chart (1998) | Position |
| Canadian Country Albums (RPM) | 8 |
| US Billboard 200 | 14 |
| US Top Country Albums (Billboard) | 3 |
| Chart (1999) | Position |
| US Top Country Albums (Billboard) | 54 |

=== Sales ===
| Region | Certification | Certified units/sales |
|---|---|---|
| Australia (ARIA) | Platinum | 70,000^{^} |
| Canada (Music Canada) | 2× Platinum | 200,000^{^} |
| United States (RIAA) | 4× Platinum | 4,000,000^{^} |
^{^} Shipments figures based on certification alone.
