= Nothin' New Under the Moon =

Single by LeAnn Rimes

from the album Sittin' on Top of the World
- Released: July 14, 1998
- Genre: Country
- Length: 3:31
- Label: Curb
- Songwriters: Rick Bowles, Josh Leo, Tom Shapiro
- Producer: Wilbur C. Rimes

LeAnn Rimes singles chronology
"Looking Through Your Eyes" (1998)	"Nothin' New Under the Moon" (1998)	"Feels Like Home" (1998)

"Nothin' New Under the Moon" is a song written Tom Shapiro, Josh Leo and Rick Bowles, and recorded by American country music artist LeAnn Rimes. It was released on July 14, 1998 as a single from her album Sittin' on Top of the World. The song peaked at number 10 on the US country charts.

== Charts ==
Chart (1998)	Peak position
Canada Country Singles (RPM)	5
US Hot Country Songs (Billboard)	10

=== Year-end charts ===
Chart (1998)	Position
Canada Country Tracks (RPM)	56
US Country Songs (Billboard)	75
