= Written in the Stars (Elton John and LeAnn Rimes song) =

1999 single by Elton John and LeAnn Rimes

Single by Elton John featuring LeAnn Rimes

from the album Aida
- Released: 22 February 1999
- Studio: Townhouse (London, England); The Village Recorder (Los Angeles)
- Length: 4:17
- Label: Rocket, Mercury
- Composer: Elton John
- Lyricist: Tim Rice
- Producers: Peter Collins; Wilbur Rimes

Elton John singles chronology
"If the River Can Bend" (1998)	"Written in the Stars" (1999)	"A Step Too Far" (1999)

LeAnn Rimes singles chronology
"These Arms of Mine" (1998)	"Written in the Stars" (1999)	"Big Deal" (1999)

"Written in the Stars"

Song by Heather Headley and Adam Pascal

from the album Aida
- Released: 13 June 2000
- Length: 3:18
- Label: EMI
- Composer: Elton John
- Lyricist: Tim Rice
- Producers: Guy Babylon, Frank Filipetti, Chris Montan, Paul Bogaev

"Written in the Stars" is a song recorded by British musician Elton John and American singer LeAnn Rimes, written by John and lyricist Tim Rice for the musical Aida. There are two different recordings of the song: one with Rimes performing the first verse, and another with John. The song was later included on Rimes' 2002 album I Need You and the concept album for the musical. The song was performed live at VH1 Divas Live '99.

== Background ==
In this scene in the musical, Radames informs Aida that he's calling off the wedding. Aida knows that this would ruin her father's escape and tells him he must go through with it. Radames agrees, on condition that she escapes to freedom on a boat he will provide. The two lovers lament the complication of the circumstances of their love together before parting.

== Chart performance ==
For John, "Written in the Stars" was his 57th top-40 single on the US Billboard charts as a performer. It would be his last US top-40 for over two decades, until he reached the region again with "Cold Heart (Pnau remix)", featuring Dua Lipa. John achieved at least one top-40 single on the US charts every year from 1970 to 1999, with this song being the last in the run. "Written in the Stars" was certified gold in the US for shipments exceeding 500,000.

In Canada, "Written in the Stars" topped the RPM Adult Contemporary chart and reached number 22 on the RPM Top Singles chart. Due to Rimes' previous country music success, it also peaked at number 74 on the RPM Country Tracks chart due to unsolicited airplay as an album cut. Elsewhere, the single reached number 10 in the United Kingdom and the top 40 in Austria, Iceland, Italy, and Switzerland.

== Music video ==
In the music video, Rimes was shown in colder, more heavenly backdrops; John was given warmer backgrounds, as in a milder depiction of hell.

== Track listing ==
CD single

1. "Written in the Stars" – 4:17
2. "Written in the Stars" (Alternate Version) – 4:24
3. "Various Snippets" (My Strongest Suit/Not Me/A Step Too Far) – 2:27

== Charts ==
=== Weekly charts ===
Chart (1999)	Peak position
Australia (ARIA)	85
Austria (Ö3 Austria Top 40)	28
Belgium (Ultratip Bubbling Under Flanders)	5
Canada Top Singles (RPM)	22
Canada Adult Contemporary (RPM)	1
Canada Country Singles (RPM)	74
Europe (Eurochart Hot 100)	37
France (SNEP)	91
Germany (GfK)	79
Iceland (Íslenski Listinn Topp 40)	20
Italy (Musica e dischi)	18
Netherlands (Single Top 100)	95
Scottish Singles Sales (Official Charts)	14
Switzerland (Schweizer Hitparade)	34
UK Singles (Official Charts)	10
US Billboard Hot 100	29
US Adult Contemporary (Billboard)	2
US Adult Pop Airplay (Billboard)	36

=== Year-end charts ===
Chart (1999)	Position
Canada Adult Contemporary (RPM)	2
UK Singles (OCC)	184
US Adult Contemporary (Billboard)	15

== Certifications ==
Region	Certification	Certified units/sales
United States (RIAA)	Gold	500,000^{^}
^{^} Shipments figures based on certification alone.

== Release history ==
Region	Date	Format(s)	Label(s)	Ref.
United States	December 1998	Adult contemporary radio	Rocket; Island; Curb	
United States	26 January 1999	Contemporary hit radio	Rocket; Island; Curb	
United Kingdom	22 February 1999	CD; cassette	Rocket; Mercury; Curb	
Canada	23 February 1999	CD	Rocket; Island; Curb	
Japan	17 March 1999	CD	Rocket; Mercury	
