= LeAnn Rimes (album) =

Studio album by LeAnn Rimes
- Released: October 26, 1999
- Recorded: 1999
- Studios: Rosewood Studio (Tyler, Texas); Sound Kitchen and Mike's Music Room (Franklin, Tennessee); The Village (Santa Monica, California).
- Genres: Country; country pop
- Length: 38:28
- Label: Curb
- Producers: Wilbur C. Rimes; LeAnn Rimes

LeAnn Rimes chronology
Sittin' on Top of the World (1998)	LeAnn Rimes (1999)	I Need You (2001)

Singles from LeAnn Rimes
- 1. "Big Deal" Released: September 21, 1999; 2. "Crazy" Released: December 28, 1999

LeAnn Rimes is the sixth studio album by American country music artist LeAnn Rimes, released on October 26, 1999, by Curb Records. The album consists almost entirely of covers of old-time country hits. Only one original song, "Big Deal", was included, which was released as the album's first single.

The album received generally positive reviews from music critics, who described its country stylings as a return to form for Rimes. Commercially, the album debuted at number one on the Top Country Albums chart and at number 8 on the Billboard 200. It has been certified Platinum by the RIAA for sales of one million copies in the United States.

== Singles ==
"Big Deal" was the album's sole release to country radio, where it reached number six on the US Hot Country Songs chart and number three on the Canada RPM Country Tracks.

A cover of the Willie Nelson song made famous by Patsy Cline, "Crazy", was released exclusively in the United Kingdom, where it reached the top forty of the UK Singles Chart.

== Critical reception ==
Professional ratings
Review scores
Source	Rating
Allmusic	4/5 stars
Entertainment Weekly	B−
Los Angeles Times	2.5/4 stars

LeAnn Rimes received generally positive reviews from music critics. Rimes's vocal ability on the album was praised as improving over time, and it was heralded by many as a return to form for Rimes, resembling the country sound of her major label debut Blue (1996) more so than her previous records.

They were also very complimentary of the album's sole original song, "Big Deal". Beth Johnson called it "contagiously youthful". Stephen Thomas Erlewine of AllMusic felt that it was the best track on the album, saying "she sounds loose, confident and exciting [...] and even more importantly, she never sounds like one of her idols - she sounds like herself".

Randy Lewis of the Los Angeles Times described it as "a sassy number that fits her age and temperament to a T," however criticized her choice of covers, saying that she "imitates rather than truly inhabits the deepest emotions of these heartbreak-heavy songs". Likewise, Beth Johnson of Entertainment Weekly felt that Rimes's interpretations of country classics were missing the "gutsiness and gut-wrenching urgency of performers who felt what they sang".

Acknowledging the criticism she received on the age appropriateness of her choice of covers, Rimes said, "I knew that making this record was taking a chance, but I think it's unfair and just really sad something like my age is used against me instead of appreciating what I worked so hard to do."

Shirley Jinkins of the Fort Worth Star-Telegram sided with Rimes, saying that LeAnn Rimes showcased that she had some "emotional maturity to go along with that perfect voice" at age 17.

== Commercial performance ==
LeAnn Rimes debuted at #8 on Billboard 200 with 115,000 copies sold in its first week.

== Track listing ==
Track listing
No.	Title	Writer(s)	Original artist	Length
1.	"Crazy"	Willie Nelson	Willie Nelson	2:53
2.	"Don't Worry"	Marty Robbins	Marty Robbins	3:30
3.	"Leavin' on Your Mind"	Wayne Walker; Webb Pierce	Patsy Cline	2:30
4.	"Faded Love"	Bob Wills; Johnnie Lee Wills	Bob Wills	3:50
5.	"Born to Lose"	Frankie Brown; Ted Daffan	Ted Daffan	3:19
6.	"Crying Time"	Buck Owens	Buck Owens	3:10
7.	"She's Got You"	Hank Cochran	Patsy Cline	3:15
8.	"I Fall to Pieces"	Cochran; Harlan Howard	Patsy Cline	2:54
9.	"Your Cheatin' Heart"	Hank Williams	Hank Williams	2:40
10.	"Lovesick Blues"	Cliff Friend; Irving Mills	Hank Williams	2:46
11.	"Me and Bobby McGee"	Fred Foster; Kris Kristofferson	Roger Miller	4:35
12.	"Big Deal"	Al Anderson; Jeffrey Steele	New recording	3:06
Total length:				38:28

== Personnel ==
- LeAnn Rimes – lead vocals, backing vocals (11, 12)
- Randy Fouts – acoustic piano (1, 2, 4–10, 12), keyboards (11)
- Gary Leach – backing vocals (1–10, 12), keyboards (3), organ (12)
- Kelly Glenn – acoustic piano (3)
- Austin Deptula – keyboards (12), backing vocals (12)
- B. James Lowry – electric guitars (1, 2, 4–11), acoustic guitars (1, 2, 4–12)
- Jerry Metheny – electric guitars (3), acoustic guitars (3)
- Marty Walsh – electric guitars (12)
- Milo Deering – steel guitar (1, 2, 4–10, 12), fiddle (4, 9, 10)
- Junior Knight – steel guitar (3)
- Mike Brignardello – bass (1, 2, 4–12), tic-tac bass (1, 2, 4–10)
- Curtis Randall – bass (3)
- Paul Leim – drums (1, 2, 4–12), percussion (8)
- Fred Gleber – drums (3)
- Darrell Holt – vibraphone (1, 4–8)
- Charlie Barnett – percussion (11)
- Carl Albrecht – percussion (12)
- Rita Baloche – backing vocals (1–10, 12)
- Perry Coleman – backing vocals (1, 2, 4–10, 12)
- Annagrey LaBasse – backing vocals (1, 2, 4–10, 12)
- David Pruitt – backing vocals (2)
- John D. Sharp – backing vocals (2)
- John R. Sharp – backing vocals (2)
- Chris Wann – backing vocals (2)
- Matthew Ward – backing vocals (3)
- Debi Lee – backing vocals (12)

The Nashville String Machine (Tracks 1 & 4–8)

- Kristin Wilkinson – arrangements and contractor
- Darrell Holt – conductor
- David Angell, Grace Bahng, Denise Baker, David Davidson, Conni Ellisor, Carl Gorodetzky, Gerald Greer, Jim Grosjean, Anthony LaMarchina, Lee Larrison, Bob Mason, Carole Neuer-Rabinowitz, Clara M. Olson, Kathryn Plummer, Pamela Sixfin, Elisabeth Small, Julie Tanner, Alan Umstead, Cathy Umstead, Gary Vanosdale, Mary Kathryn Vanosdale, Kristin Wilkinson and Karen Winklemann – string players

== Production ==
- Wilbur C. Rimes – producer
- LeAnn Rimes – co-producer
- Greg Hunt – chief engineer, mixing
- Austin Deptula – assistant engineer, digital editing, mastering
- Gary Leach – assistant engineer
- Terry Christian – string recording
- Bob Horn – second string engineer
- Glenn Sweitzer and Fresh Design – art direction, design
- Andrew Southam – photography
- George Blodwell – wardrobe stylist
- Heidi Lee – make-up
- Kohl – hair stylist

== Charts ==
=== Weekly charts ===
Weekly chart performance for LeAnn Rimes
Chart (1999)	Peak position
Australian Albums (ARIA)	74
Canada Top Albums/CDs (RPM)	11
Canadian Country Albums (RPM)	2
UK Albums (OCC)	119
UK Country Albums (Official Charts)	2
US Billboard 200	8
US Top Country Albums (Billboard)	1

=== Year-end chart ===
Chart (1999)	Position
Canadian Country Albums (RPM)	42
US Top Country Albums (Billboard)	33
Chart (2000)	Position
US Billboard 200	118
US Top Country Albums (Billboard)	10

=== Sales ===
Region	Certification	Certified units/sales
Canada (Music Canada)	Platinum	100,000^{^}
United States (RIAA)	Platinum	1,000,000^{^}
^{^} Shipments figures based on certification alone.
