= How Do I Live =

1997 single by LeAnn Rimes and Trisha Yearwood

Single by LeAnn Rimes

from the album You Light Up My Life: Inspirational Songs
- B-side: "You Light Up My Life"; "Blue"
- Released: May 23, 1997
- Recorded: 1997
- Studio: Glenn Meadows/Masterfonics (Nashville, Tennessee); Starstruck (Nashville, Tennessee); Barking Dog (Mt. Kisco, New York); KD (Nashville, Tennessee); Curb (Nashville, Tennessee)
- Genre: Pop
- Length: 4:25
- Label: Curb
- Songwriter: Diane Warren
- Producers: Chuck Howard; Wilbur C. Rimes; Mike Curb

LeAnn Rimes singles chronology
"The Light in Your Eyes" (1997)	"How Do I Live" (1997)	"You Light Up My Life" (1997)

Music video
- "How Do I Live" by LeAnn Rimes on YouTube

"How Do I Live"

Single by Trisha Yearwood

from the album (Songbook) A Collection of Hits
- B-side: "She's in Love with the Boy"
- Released: May 23, 1997
- Recorded: 1997
- Genre: Country
- Length: 4:28
- Label: MCA Nashville
- Songwriter: Diane Warren
- Producers: Tony Brown; Trisha Yearwood

Trisha Yearwood singles chronology
"I Need You" (1997)	"How Do I Live" (1997)	"In Another's Eyes" (1997)

Audio
- "How Do I Live" by Trisha Yearwood on YouTube

"How Do I Live" is a song written by Diane Warren. It was originally performed by American singer and actress LeAnn Rimes and was the first single from her second studio album, You Light Up My Life: Inspirational Songs (1997). It also appeared on international editions of her follow-up album Sittin' on Top of the World (1998). A second version was recorded the same year by American singer Trisha Yearwood, and was featured in the film Con Air. Both versions were serviced to radio on May 23, 1997.

In the United States, Rimes's version peaked at No. 2 for five non-consecutive weeks in late 1997 and early 1998. It set a number of records on the Billboard Hot 100. In 2014, Billboard listed the song as the No. 1 song of the 1990s, despite never reaching the position on the weekly tally. It ranks at No. 6 on Billboard's All Time Top 100, the only single in the top 10 of this list not to have been a number-one hit. It has been certified quadruple platinum by the Recording Industry Association of America (RIAA) for shipments of four million copies in the US.

Despite only peaking as high as No. 7 in the UK Singles Chart, Rimes's version of "How Do I Live" spent 34 weeks on the chart, ending up as the sixth-best-selling single of 1998, outsold only by five of the year's number-one singles. As of August 2014, the song has sold 710,000 copies in the UK.

== Background ==
Diane Warren initially wrote "How Do I Live" to be featured on the 1997 action blockbuster Con Air soundtrack. Walt Disney Pictures, the company behind the film's Touchstone Pictures label, commissioned Rimes to record the song first. After hearing Rimes' recording, the producers felt it lacked maturity, deeming Rimes's voice "too pop-sounding". Disney then hired Trisha Yearwood to re-record "How Do I Live"; according to Yearwood, she was unaware of Rimes' recording prior to performing her own.

Yearwood's version, which utilized a throatier, country-western vibe, was used in the film. When Rimes's record label, Curb Records, decided to shelve the song, Warren personally called label head Mike Curb and suggested he release it as a single instead; her version was then quickly released to mainstream pop radio on the same day as Yearwood's rendition. Neither version of the song was included on the soundtrack album for the film (which consists of the score by Trevor Rabin and Mark Mancina). Yearwood's version reached number two on the U.S. country singles chart and was internationally successful. It appeared on her first compilation album (Songbook) A Collection of Hits (1997). The album certified quadruple-platinum in the United States.

Rimes' version was released as the first single from her album You Light Up My Life: Inspirational Songs (1997). It was included on her compilations Greatest Hits (2003), The Best of LeAnn Rimes (2004), and All-Time Greatest Hits (2015). The CD single was later reissued with the extended version of the song being replaced by Mr. Mig's Dance Radio Edit, which would later be featured on The Best of LeAnn Rimes: Remixed (2004); the later release Dance Like You Don't Give A...Greatest Hits Remixes (2014) featured a new remix by Cahill. "How Do I Live" was later covered by F.I.R.; their version featured new vocals by Rimes and was included their third album Flight Tribe (2006).

== Critical reception ==
=== Rimes version ===
Larry Flick from Billboard magazine described the song as a "straight-ahead pop ballad" and noted that Rimes "has a field day with this beautiful, richly soulful Diane Warren composition, giving it a youthful exuberance and wide-eyed innocence that will melt even the coldest heart." He also added that Rimes "is so vigorously courting the pop world with this single" and that she "has offered a tune that makes the most of her formidable pipes and leaves listeners salivating for more." Alanna Nash from Entertainment Weekly called it a "lush version". British magazine Music Week gave the song a score of four out of five. In 2019, Stacker placed Rimes's version of the song at No. 1 in their list of "Best 90s Pop Songs", naming it a "classic break-up tune". David Sinclair from The Times viewed it as a "sludgy ballad by the 14-year-old prodigy." In August 2026, Billboard ranked it at No. 1 in their list of "The Biggest No. 2 Hot 100 Hits of All Time", noting that the song had peaked at number two, just behind Elton John's "Candle in the Wind 1997" / "Something About the Way You Look Tonight" and Savage Garden's "Truly Madly Deeply".

=== Yearwood version ===
Regarding Yearwood's version, Flick stated that Yearwood "is a vocalist with the depth and intensity to convey the love and longing in the lyric." He added that the production by the singer with Tony Brown "is lush and textured, but it is her vocal that is this single's centerpiece. It's full of passion and subtle nuances." Alanna Nash from Entertainment Weekly described Yearwood's version as a "countrier rendition". She noted, "When Yearwood sings, ”If you ever leave/Baby, you would take away everything good in my life,” her voice throbs with adult emotion." A reviewer from Music Week viewed it as a "poppier" version than Rimes'.

== Chart performance ==
Both the Rimes and the Yearwood versions debuted on the US Billboard Hot 100 on the week ending June 14, 1997. Rimes's version was noted for its extreme longevity, spending a record-breaking 69 weeks on the chart, with 62 of those weeks being in the top 40, 32 weeks in the top ten and 25 in the top five, all records at the time. Such was the run in the top five for Rimes that, despite not peaking at No. 1 and instead spending five non-consecutive weeks at No. 2, it competed directly with two songs by R&B singer Usher, "You Make Me Wanna..." and "Nice & Slow", which were released five months apart from each other. Rimes's version also performed well on other component charts, most notably spending 11 weeks atop the Adult Contemporary chart.

Despite this success, Trisha Yearwood's version was most successful on country radio. Although Yearwood's version was moving quickly up the pop charts, getting as high as No. 23, MCA refused to issue further copies of the single, afraid of cannibalizing album sales. As a result, the limited press run of 300,000 sold out quickly, and the single was off the Hot 100 after 12 weeks. However, on country radio it became much more commercially successful, climbing all the way to No. 2, where it peaked for one week, outpacing the peak of 43 set by the recording Rimes released.

Consequently, Yearwood's version was among the top 20 biggest country singles of 1997, while Rimes's version was the ninth and fifth best- charting singles on the pop charts for the years 1997 and 1998, respectively. Rimes's version was later ranked at No. 4 on Billboard's All Time Top 100 in 2008. It was ranked by Billboard as the 12th-most-successful single of the 1990s at the end of the decade in 1999. 15 years later, after retabulations, it was re-ranked as the second best-charting single that was released during the decade, and the best-charting single of the 1990s proper. In a retrospective compilation in conjunction with SiriusXM from 2019, Billboard ranked "How Do I Live" second on their list of top performing songs of the decade.

Internationally, the singles also had varied success, with Rimes's version typically outperforming Yearwood's. In the UK, Rimes's version peaked at No. 7, spending 30 weeks on the UK Top 40 singles chart and ranking as the sixth highest selling single on the UK year-end chart for 1998, while Yearwood's version landed at No. 66. Rimes's version additionally charted across central Europe, reaching the top 5 in the Netherlands and Norway, the top 20 in Denmark, and the top 40 in Austria, Germany, and Switzerland. Conversely, in both Ireland and Australia as well as on the Canadian country charts, Yearwood's version managed to outpace Rimes's peak at Nos. 2, 3, and 1 to Rimes's 14, 17, and 60, respectively. Consequently, Yearwood's version was ranked in the top 20 and 30 for the 1997 Australian and Canadian country year-end charts, respectively.

== Accolades ==
In 1998, for the first time in history, the Grammy Awards nominated two artists for the same song in the same category. Directly following Rimes's performance of the song, Yearwood won the Grammy Award for Best Female Country Vocal Performance. Yearwood also performed the song at the Country Music Association for which she won the 1997 award for Female Vocalist of the Year. Yearwood also won the 1997 Academy of Country Music Award for Top Female Vocalist.

The song also was nominated for the Academy Award for Best Original Song, but lost to "My Heart Will Go On" from the film Titanic. Yearwood performed the song at the award ceremony. Ironically, the song received a contradictory nomination for the Golden Raspberry Award for Worst Original Song, but "lost" again to the soundtrack for The Postman.

== Track listings ==
=== Rimes version ===
- US single
1. "How Do I Live" – 4:25
2. "How Do I Live" (original extended version) – 4:53
- US single re-release
1. "How Do I Live" (film mix) – 4:25
2. "How Do I Live" (Mr. Mig Dance Radio Edit) – 3:54
- US and UK maxi-single; US and UK digital download and vinyl
1. "How Do I Live" (Mr. Mig Dance Radio Edit) – 3:54
2. "How Do I Live" (Mr. Mig Club Radio Edit) – 4:15
3. "How Do I Live" (RH Factor Radio Edit) – 3:45
4. "How Do I Live" (Mr. Mig Club Mix) – 7:38
5. "How Do I Live" (original extended version) – 4:53
- UK single
1. "How Do I Live" – 4:25
2. "Blue" – 2:47
- UK maxi-CD
1. "How Do I Live" – 4:25
2. "You Light Up My Life" – 3:34
3. "How Do I Live" (Mr. Mig Remix Club Radio Edit) – 4:15
4. "How Do I Live" (RH Factor Radio Edit) – 3:45
- UK maxi-CD 2; Australian CD single
1. "Commitment" – 4:36
2. "How Do I Live" (Mr. Mig Dance Radio Edit) – 3:54
3. "How Do I Live" (Mr. Mig Club Radio Edit) – 4:15
4. "How Do I Live" (RH Factor Radio Edit) – 3:45
5. "How Do I Live" (Mr. Mig Club Mix) – 7:38
6. "How Do I Live" (original extended version) – 4:53
- Germany maxi-CD
1. "How Do I Live" (radio edit) – 3:45
2. "How Do I Live" (original extended version) – 4:25
3. "How Do I Live" (Mr. Mig Dance Radio Edit) – 3:54
4. "How Do I Live" (Mr. Mig Club Radio Edit) – 4:15

=== Yearwood version ===
- US and Japan CD single; US cassette single
1. "How Do I Live" – 4:28
2. "How Do I Live" (video version) – 4:07
- European CD single
1. "How Do I Live" (video version) – 4:07
2. "How Do I Live" – 4:28
3. "She's in Love with the Boy" – 4:05

== Personnel ==
Rimes version

Personnel are adapted from the liner notes of the UK version of Sittin' on Top of the World.

- Wilbur C. Rimes – production
- Chuck Howard – production
- Mike Curb – production
- Lesley Albert – production coordination
- Mary Ann Kennedy – background vocals
- Pam Rose – background vocals
- Michael Black – background vocals
- Dennis Wilson – background vocals
- Mick Guzauski – mixing engineer, mixing
- Bob Campbell-Smith – mixing engineer, recording, mixing
- Greg Morrow – drums
- Michael Spriggs – acoustic guitar
- John Willis – electric guitar
- Michael Rhodes – bass
- Steve Nathan – piano, keys
- Paul Franklin – steel guitar
- Jeff Watkins – assistant recording
- Daniel Kresco – assistant recording, additional recording
- Scott Ahaus – assistant recording, assistant mixing
- Jim Rogers – assistant recording
- David Boyer – assistant recording
- Csaba Petocz – recording
- David Hall – assistant recording

== Charts ==
=== Rimes version ===
==== Weekly charts ====
Chart (1997–1999)	Peak position
Australia (ARIA)	17
Austria (Ö3 Austria Top 40)	24
Canada Top Singles (RPM)	19
Canada Adult Contemporary (RPM)	13
Canada Country Singles (RPM)	60
Denmark (IFPI)	17
Europe (Eurochart Hot 100)	16
Germany (GfK)	22
Ireland (IRMA)	14
Netherlands (Dutch Top 40)	4
Netherlands (Single Top 100)	5
Norway (VG-lista)	4
Scottish Singles Sales (Official Charts)	6
Switzerland (Schweizer Hitparade)	24
UK Singles (Official Charts)	7
US Billboard Hot 100	2
US Adult Contemporary (Billboard)	1
US Adult Pop Airplay (Billboard)	10
US Hot Country Songs (Billboard)	43
US Pop Airplay (Billboard)	4

==== Year-end charts ====
Chart (1997)	Position
Brazil Airplay (Crowley)	26
US Billboard Hot 100	9
US Adult Contemporary (Billboard)	8
US Top 40/Mainstream (Billboard)	35

Chart (1998)	Position
Netherlands (Dutch Top 40)	13
Netherlands (Single Top 100)	22
UK Singles (OCC)	6
US Billboard Hot 100	5
US Adult Contemporary (Billboard)	9
US Adult Top 40 (Billboard)	61
US Mainstream Top 40 (Billboard)	67
US Maxi-Singles Sales (Billboard)	11
US Rhythmic Top 40 (Billboard)	67

Chart (1999)	Position
Germany (Media Control)	84

==== Decade-end charts ====
Chart (1990–1999)	Position
US Billboard Hot 100	12

=== Yearwood version ===
==== Weekly charts ====
Chart (1997)	Peak position
Australia (ARIA)	3
Canada Adult Contemporary (RPM)	28
Canada Country Singles (RPM)	1
Ireland (IRMA)	2
Taiwan (IFPI)	1
UK Singles (Official Charts)	66
US Billboard Hot 100	23
US Hot Country Songs (Billboard)	2

==== Year-end charts ====
Chart (1997)	Position
Australia (ARIA)	12
Canada Adult Contemporary Tracks (RPM)	71
Canada Country Tracks (RPM)	27
US Country Songs (Billboard)	18

== Certifications ==
=== Rimes version ===
Region	Certification	Certified units/sales
Netherlands (NVPI)	Gold	50,000^{^}
New Zealand (RMNZ)	Platinum	30,000^{‡}
Norway (IFPI Norway)	Gold	
United Kingdom (BPI)	2× Platinum	1,200,000^{‡}
United States (RIAA)	4× Platinum	3,500,000
^{*} Sales figures based on certification alone.^{^} Shipments figures based on certification alone.^{‡} Sales+streaming figures based on certification alone.

=== Yearwood version ===
Region	Certification	Certified units/sales
Australia (ARIA)	2× Platinum	140,000^{^}
^{^} Shipments figures based on certification alone.

== Release history ==
=== Rimes version ===
Region	Version	Date	Format(s)	Label(s)	Ref.
United States	Original	May 23, 1997	Radio	Curb	
United States	Dance Mix	February 10, 1998	12-inch vinyl; CD	Curb	
United Kingdom	Original	February 23, 1998	CD; cassette	Curb; The Hit Label	
United Kingdom	Dance Mix	March 2, 1998	CD	Curb; The Hit Label	
Japan	Original	November 21, 1998	Mini-CD	Curb	

=== Yearwood version ===
Region	Date	Format(s)	Label(s)	Ref.
United States	May 23, 1997	Radio	MCA Nashville	
United Kingdom	July 28, 1997	CD; cassette	MCA Nashville	
Japan	October 1, 1997	CD	MCA Nashville	
