= Drew G. Montalvo =

DJ Drew G
- Also known as: Drew Gilbert
- Born: Andrew Gilbert Montalvo; April 4, 1983 (age 43); North Babylon, New York
- Origin: New York City, New York
- Genres: Progressive House, Electro, House
- Occupations: DJ, Producer, Remix Artist, Session Guitarist
- Instruments: Keyboard & Guitar
- Labels: Dirty Pop Productions USA / 69ing Chipmunks, Citrusonic - Los Angeles
- Spouse(s): Eric Hanser (m. 2013–2019) Michael Lee (m. 2020–2021)
- Website: officialdirtypop.com

DJ Drew G (born Andrew Gilbert Montalvo) is an American-born DJ and music producer in Houston, as well as a reporter for DJ news Magazine and Billboard Magazine.

== Career ==
Drew had an interest in music from a young age. During his adolescence, he learned to play guitar and performed with various metal bands. By the age of 20, he had released five albums and produced several others for local bands. In 2000, he was drawn to the New York City house music scene. Inspired by the DJ masters he enjoyed, he began to mix his own tracks featuring house music and his own guitar work. Drew began his career as a DJ by playing smaller venues in New York City. He then began traveling to clubs in other cities, such as Washington, DC and Los Angeles, CA. Drew has played New York City's Black Party (as the youngest DJ ever to play the event), numerous Cherry weekend events in Washington, DC, a 2008 Presidential Inaugural ball for President Barack Obama, Carnival in Puerto Vallarta, Mexico, Ski Weeks in Aspen, Colorado, Mammoth Lakes [Elevation], the Pink Party in Denver, CO, Mardi Gras in Sydney, Australia, Dunes Resort events in Saugatuck, Michigan, Ascension weekend at Fire Island Pines, and Sand Blast in Asbury Park, New Jersey.

In 2022 Madonna announced the release of "Finally Enough Love: 50 #1s" a collection of her 50 #1 Billboard Dance singles and Dirty Pop's remix of "Ghostown" was chosen to represent that single on this collection.

Drew has produced official remixes (either solo or with remix partner Brian Cua) for successful music artists Madonna, Beyoncé, LeAnn Rimes, Blondie, Ed Sheeran, and RuPaul, among others.

== Dirty Pop ==
Dirty Pop is best known as the name of the remixing duo of Drew G. and fellow producer Brian Cua. 2014 and 2015 were particular banner years for Dirty Pop's production work. During that time, both Beyoncé ("Blow", "Pretty Hurts", "7/11") and Madonna ("Living for Love", "Ghosttown", "Bitch I'm Madonna") selected Drew and Brian to be official remixers of their singles.

The duo continues to produce remixes and original tracks. Their two original tracks, "Gag", "Light Up the Night", and their remake of "Nothing's Gonna Stop Us Now", have all charted on the Billboard Dance Club Play Chart.

The Dirty Pop brand also encompasses the traveling dance party in the U.S.

== Remixes ==
=== As DrewG. ===
DrewG. Official Commercially Released Remixes

- 2017 "Fun" - Blondie
- 2017 "Rose All Day" - Bobby Newberry
- 2017 "Long Live Love" - LeAnn Rimes
- 2017 "Love Is Love Is Love" - LeAnn Rimes
- 2017 "Hard Times" - Randy Jones
- 2017 "Running Back to You" - Bright Light Bright Light
- 2017 "Mob Luxuries" - Uche
- 2017 "Don't You Hide (l.i.b) - Ivana Lola
- 2017 "Lost Love" - Lisa Cole
- 2017 "Unity" - Knife N Fork N Leo Frappier ft. Bebe Sweetbriar
- 2016 "Cryptic Love" - The Trash Mermaids
- 2016 "It Starts Raining" - Side FX and Kim Cameron
- 2010 "Work it Out" - Lovari
- 2009 "Cover Girl" - Rupaul

DrewG. Official Promotion Only Remixes

- 2017 "Castle On The Hill" - Ed Sheeran
- 2017 "Heart Away From You" - DJ Pebbles

=== As Dirty Pop ===
Dirty Pop Official Commercially Released Remixes

- 2017 "Cocaine and Whiskey" - Jason Dottley
- 2016 "Burning Up" - Karine Hannah & Dave Audé
- 2016 "Girl From Ipanema" - Ana Paula ft. Deborah Cox
- 2016 "We Can Make It" - Offer Nissim ft Dana International
- 2016 "Purse First" - Bob the Drag Queen
- 2016 "The Glittering Gutter" - Billie Ray Martin
- 2016 "One Night In Heaven" - Toy Armada & DJ GRIND ft. Inaya Day
- 2016 "World" - Gia
- 2016 "My Heart Beats Faster" - Swishcraft ft Emoni Washington
- 2016 "Imagine" - Sir Ivan
- 2016 "I'll Sleep When I Die" - The Kissboyz
- 2015 "Bitch I'm Madonna" - Madonna
- 2015 "Living for Love" - Madonna
- 2015 "Ghosttown" - Madonna
- 2015 "Kaleidoscope" - Courtney Act
- 2015 "Sacrifice" - John DeGrazio
- 2015 "High Enough" - Alina Artts
- 2015 "I Like You" - Tony Moran ft Debby Holiday
- 2015 "Su-Su-Su Superstar" - Brian Kent
- 2015 "Wimbledon" - Rich White Ladies
- 2015 "Time to Move On" - Mary Wilson
- 2015 "Same Love" - Tracy Young ft. Karina Iglesias
- 2015 "I Just Go" - Aiden Leslie
- 2015 "Believe" - Chaos ft CeCe Peniston
- 2015 "Bass In Me" - Chron
- 2015 "Back To You" - Natasha Ashworth
- 2014 "Burn" - DJ Shocker
- 2014 "Werq" - Carmen Electra
- 2014 "Speak No Evil" - Kimberly Davis
- 2014 "It's Love To Me" - Matt Ryanz
- 2012 "I'm Free" - Hayla
- 2011 "Sweet Sugar Poison" - Dave Matthias and Julissa Veloz
- 2011 "Coming Back" - Matt Consola ft. Brenda Reed

Dirty Pop Official Promotional Only Remixes

- 2016 "Stronger Together" - Jessica Sanchez
- 2014 "Pretty Hurts" - Beyoncé
- 2014 "7/11" - Beyoncé
- 2014 "Blow" - Beyoncé
- 2011 "Love On Top" - Beyoncé

== Awards and recognition ==
- 2014 Best Unofficial Remixer – Dirrty Remixes
- 2013 "Dancing Queen" aka Best DJ Weho Confidential
- 2013 Coors Light Coldest DJ (LA) GayCities
- 2012 Out Magazine Top 10 DJs
- 2012 Best Las Vegas DJ, Sin City Times
- 2011 People Choice Award DJ – Tom Whitman Presents (LA)
