= Love Is Love Is Love =

Single by LeAnn Rimes

from the album Remnants
- Released: May 19, 2017
- Length: 3:50 (album version); 3:16 (single version)
- Label: RCA; Sony; Thirty Tigers; RED
- Songwriter(s): LeAnn Rimes; Darrell Brown; Lindy Robbins; Toby Gad
- Producer(s): LeAnn Rimes; Darrell Brown; Mark Batson; Niko Bolas

LeAnn Rimes singles chronology
"Long Live Love" (2016)	"Love Is Love Is Love" (2017)	"Love Line" (2017)

"Love Is Love Is Love" (stylized as "LovE Is LovE Is LovE") is a song recorded by American singer LeAnn Rimes, and the fourth release from her sixteenth studio album, Remnants. She co-produced it with Darrell Brown, Mark Batson and Niko Bolas, and co-wrote it with Brown, Lindy Robbins and Toby Gad. It plays in the 2017 American film Logan Lucky, in which Rimes has a cameo.

== Background ==
The single celebrates the LGBTQ community, as Rimes has been a longtime supporter. In an interview with Us Rimes explained the message behind the song: "A ‘Pride’ celebration is a living thing. It is breathing authenticity. It's a space we hold for one another, a place to come into what our souls move us to be, it's a place in love and only love,” adding “That’s why the LGBTQ community continues to inspire me and enliven my spirit every time I perform for them."

== Chart performance ==
The single became her third number one on the Billboard Dance Club Songs chart dated August 5, 2017, and her second number one in 2017, as "Long Live Love" previously reached the top spot in March of that year. It is also Rimes's third single to reach number one on the chart after "What I Cannot Change" in 2009.

In an interview with Billboard about the song reaching number one, Rimes commented "It is such an honor to have the DJs, clubs and fans welcoming me this way. I have loved and will always love club and dance music. When 'Long Live Love' went to No. 1, it was extremely exciting, but to have 'LovE Is LovE Is LovE' go No. 1, well, it brings out so many emotions in me. The message of supporting across-the-board global equality is dear to me and I know to so many others in the club world. A big thank you to the remixers for always bringing out a fresh viewpoint to my songs. It was very fun and intense to re-record my vocals at different tempos for the remixes."

== Track listing ==
Digital download

1. "Love Is Love Is Love" - 3:16

Remixes EP

Love Is Love Is Love (The Remixes) – EP
No.	Title	Length
1.	"Love Is Love Is Love" (Dave Audé Disco Edit)	3:18
2.	"Love Is Love Is Love" (Dave Audé Disco Remix)	4:40
3.	"Love Is Love Is Love" (Drew G Remix)	5:35
4.	"Love Is Love Is Love" (Drew G Edit)	4:04
5.	"Love Is Love Is Love" (Mauro Mozart remix)	6:28
Total length:		24:02

== Charts ==
Chart (2017)	Peak position
US Dance Club Songs (Billboard)	1

== Release history ==
List of releases, showing region, release date, format, label, and reference
Region	Date	Format	Version	Label	Ref.
United States	January 23, 2017	Hot adult contemporary radio	Single	RCA; Sony UK	
Various	May 19, 2017	Digital download; streaming	Single	RCA; Sony UK	
Various	June 16, 2017	Digital download; streaming	Remixes EP	RCA; Sony UK	
