= Too Much (Blondie song) =

Single by Blondie

from the album Pollinator
- Released: June 12, 2017
- Recorded: 2016
- Genre: Pop rock
- Length: 3:09; 2:59 (radio edit)
- Label: BMG
- Songwriters: Matthew Katz-Bohen; Laurel Katz-Bohen
- Producer: John Congleton

Blondie singles chronology
"Long Time" (2017)	"Too Much" (2017)	"Doom or Destiny" (2017)

"Too Much" is a song by the American rock band Blondie, written by Matthew Katz-Bohen and Laurel Katz-Bohen. It was released as the third single from their eleventh studio album Pollinator on June 12, 2017, in European countries as a CD single, as well as a digital download. It was released elsewhere in the world on July 28, 2017. Two versions of the single exist, the full-length album version released as a single in Europe, as well as a radio edit released to radio in America as well.

== Background and cover art ==
The song was recorded in 2016, and was one of the first songs recorded for Pollinator. Lyrically, it is about recovering after a breakup after thinking that the relationship was meant to last and picking up the pieces and leaving, still remaining in love. The cover art released for the single is exactly the same blue version of the album cover used for the artwork of the promotional single "Tonight".

== Critical reception ==
"Too Much" met with critical acclaim, as did the previous Pollinator's singles. The Key claims "Pierced with synths and one of the catchiest hooks on the record, “Too Much” is another contemporary classic." Mushroom Promotions states that this song "proves Blondie continues to evolve almost song by song." However, Under the Radar Magazine called it "slick and sticky," and "has little to offer outside of the chorus." The song has a rating of 3.18 out of 5 on Rate Your Music. Despite critical acclaim, the song did not chart.

== Track listings ==
Digital download
No.	Title	Writer(s)	Length
1.	"Too Much"	M. Katz-Bohen, L. Katz-Bohen	3:09

Promo CD single
No.	Title	Writer(s)	Length
1.	"Too Much (radio edit)"	M. Katz-Bohen, L. Katz-Bohen	2:59
