= Long Live Love (LeAnn Rimes song) =

Single by LeAnn Rimes

from the album Remnants
- Released: December 2, 2016
- Length: 3:19
- Label: RCA; Sony; Thirty Tigers; RED
- Songwriters: LeAnn Rimes; Darrell Brown; Mark Batson
- Producers: LeAnn Rimes; Darrell Brown; Mark Batson; Niko Bolas

LeAnn Rimes singles chronology
"How to Kiss a Boy" (2016)	"Long Live Love" (2016)	"Love Is Love Is Love" (2017)

"Long Live Love" is a song recorded by American singer LeAnn Rimes for her sixteenth studio album, Remnants (2016). Rimes co-wrote and co-produced the track with Darrell Brown and Mark Batson, with additional production from Niko Bolas. The song was released to digital retailers on December 2, 2016, through RCA Records and Sony Music UK as the album's third single. The song serves as the record's official lead single in North America and impacted American radio in January 2017.

"Long Live Love" has become Rimes' second number one hit on the Billboard Dance Club Songs chart.

== Release and promotion ==
"Long Live Love" was released to digital retailers worldwide on December 2, 2016, through RCA Records and Sony Music UK. The following week, the North American release date of Remnants was announced by Billboard. While previously released UK singles "The Story" and "How to Kiss a Boy" are available in the United States, "Long Live Love" serves as the official lead single in that market. It was serviced to American hot adult contemporary radio on January 23, 2017, marking Rimes's first radio-promoted single in four years since "Gasoline and Matches" in 2013.

Rimes embarked upon the Long Live Love Club Tour in January 2017 in Los Angeles, California and later took the tour to the United Kingdom. Rimes performed the song live on The Today Show on February 3, 2017. Following the song's #1 success on the Dance Club Songs chart, RCA and Sony commissioned a set of official remixes to further promote the single, which were released as an extended play on February 10, 2017.

== Critical reception ==
Jason Scott of AXS wrote that "Long Live Love" was "among the singer's best recordings," and attributed the song's lyrical success to Rimes's life experience. Matt Bjorke of country music blog Roughstock called the song a "great tempo-filled track" and noted its suitability for adult contemporary radio.

== Commercial performance ==
"Long Live Love" debuted at number 37 on the Billboard Dance Club Songs chart dated January 7, 2017. It reached the top spot on the chart dated March 4, 2017; with this peak, it became Rimes's second single to reach number one on the chart after "What I Cannot Change" in 2009.

== Track listing ==
Long Live Love (The Remixes) – EP
No.	Title	Length
1.	"Long Live Love" (Dave Audé Club)	5:39
2.	"Long Live Love" (Dave Audé Edit)	3:57
3.	"Long Live Love" (Ivan Gomez Club)	6:54
4.	"Long Live Love" (Ivan Gomez Edit)	4:14
5.	"Long Live Love" (DJ Deville Remix)	3:18
6.	"Long Live Love" (DrewG. Remix)	6:31
7.	"Long Live Love" (DrewG. Dub)
Total length:		24:02

== Charts ==
Chart (2017)	Peak position
US Adult Pop Airplay (Billboard)	38
US Dance Club Songs (Billboard)	1

== Release history ==
List of releases, showing region, release date, format, label, and reference
Region	Date	Format	Label	Ref.
Worldwide	December 2, 2016	Digital download	RCA; Sony UK	
United States	January 23, 2017	Hot adult contemporary radio	Thirty Tigers; RED	
Worldwide	February 10, 2017	Digital download – Remixes EP	RCA; Sony UK	
