= Crazy Woman =

Crazy Woman may refer to:

- "Crazy Woman" (song), a 1974 rock song
- Crazy Woman Creek, an American river

== See also ==
- "Crazy Women"
