= You're the Reason (disambiguation) =

"You're the Reason" is a 1961 song by Bobby Edwards.

You're the Reason may also refer to:

- You're the Reason (EP) or the title track, by Melinda Doolittle, 2013
- "You're the Reason" (Victorious song), 2011
- "You're the Reason", a 1998 song by Wamdue Project (Chris Brann)

== See also ==
- You Are the Reason (disambiguation)
