= Give (song) =

Single by LeAnn Rimes

from the album Lady & Gentlemen
- B-side: "Swingin'"
- Released: June 14, 2011
- Genre: Country, country rock
- Length: 4:29
- Label: Curb
- Songwriters: Connie Harrington, Sonya Isaacs, Jimmy Yeary
- Producers: Vince Gill, Darrell Brown, LeAnn Rimes

LeAnn Rimes singles chronology
| "Crazy Women" (2010) | "Give" (2011) | "What Have I Done" (2012) |

Audio sample
- A 29 second sample of LeAnn Rimes' "Give", featuring the chorus.: file; help

"Give" is a song by American country recording artist LeAnn Rimes, taken from her twelfth studio album Lady & Gentlemen (2011). The song is written by Connie Harrington, Sonya Isaacs and Jimmy Yeary, and produced by Vince Gill, Darrell Brown and Rimes. It was released as the album's third and final single on June 14, 2011 by Curb Records. A set of remixes of the song were released on October 11, 2011.

== Background ==
The single was officially released for digital download to iTunes stores and Amazon.com on June 14, 2011. The single was released to radio on July 18, 2011. A set of remixes was released by iTunes stores for digital download on October 11, 2011.

== Critical reception ==
Jonathan Keefe of Slant Magazine gave a mixed review on the song stating that "Rimes delivers a lovely, subtle performance on "Give," but the song lacks the depth of insight that "What I Cannot Change," the standout track on Family, proved she's capable of writing." Randy Lewis of the Los Angeles Times claimed that song takes Rimes "back to the contemporary pop-country mainstream."

== Music video ==
The music video for "Give" was released on Rimes' official YouTube on September 9, 2011. A shorter version of the song was released later on CMT.com. Both videos are directed by Nigel Dick.

== Track listing ==
Digital Download

1. "Give" (Radio Edit) — 4:06

US/UK Digital Download - Remixes

1. "Give" (Cahill Radio Edit) — 3:45
2. "Give" (Mixin' Marc & Tony Svejda Radio Edit) — 3:35
3. "Give" (Almighty Radio Edit) — 3:48
4. "Give" (Cahill Club Mix) — 7:31
5. "Give" (Mixin' Marc & Tony Svejda Extended Mix) — 5:30
6. "Give" (Almighty Club Mix) — 6:49

UK Promo CD single

1. "Give" (Radio Edit) — 4:06
2. "Swingin'" — 3:02

UK Promo Maxi single

1. "Give" (Almighty Radio Edit) — 3:48
2. "Give" (Almighty Club Mix) — 6:49
3. "Give" (Almighty Dub) — 6:40
4. "Give" (Almighty Instrumental) — 6:39

US Promo CD single

1. "Give" (Radio Edit) — 4:06

== Charts ==
| Chart (2011–12) | Peak position |
|---|---|
| US Hot Country Songs (Billboard) | 47 |
| US Dance Club Songs (Billboard) | 11 |
