= Remnants (LeAnn Rimes album) =

Studio album by LeAnn Rimes
- Released: October 28, 2016
- Genres: Pop rock; country pop
- Length: 47:53
- Label: RCA
- Producers: LeAnn Rimes; Darrell Brown; Mark Batson; Niko Bolas; Steve Jordan

LeAnn Rimes chronology
| Today Is Christmas (2015) | Remnants (2016) | The Biggest Hits of LeAnn Rimes (2018) |

Singles from Remnants
- 1. "The Story" Released: June 24, 2016; 2. "How to Kiss a Boy" Released: September 9, 2016; 3. "Long Live Love" Released: December 2, 2016; 4. "Love Is Love Is Love" Released: May 19, 2017; 5. "Love Line" Released: November 3, 2017

Remnants is the fifteenth studio album by American country and pop singer-songwriter LeAnn Rimes. It was released in the United Kingdom and Europe on October 28, 2016. The album was released in the United States on February 3, 2017. It is the first and only album released by Rimes under her contract with RCA Records, following the end of her contract with Curb Records.

The first single to be released in the UK was a cover of Brandi Carlile's "The Story" on June 24, 2016. Rimes promoted the single across the UK, the first time she had promoted a single there since 2007. To promote the album, Rimes embarked on a tour, the Remnants Tour, which began in February 2017 in the UK.

== Release ==
The album was launched in the United Kingdom and Europe on October 28, 2016. It was released on CD and as a download, in both standard and deluxe versions. It was released in the United States on February 3, 2017.

== Promotion ==
- In 2016, Rimes performed at the televised UK concert Radio 2 Live in Hyde Park and later embarked on a 2017 UK Tour.
- Rimes performed "How to Kiss a Boy" on Strictly Come Dancing.

=== Singles ===
To promote the album, Rimes released a cover of Brandi Carlile's "The Story" as the first single in the UK on June 24, 2016. This was followed by "How to Kiss a Boy" on September 9, 2016. "Long Live Love" was released as the album's first US single on May 19, 2017. It was released to American hot adult contemporary radio on January 23, 2017. The final single released from the album was "Love Line" on November 3, 2017.

== Commercial performance ==
Remnants debuted at number 88 on the Billboard 200 chart dated February 25, 2017, earning 7,000 album-equivalent units in its first week, of which 6,000 were pure album sales. The album reached number 15 on the UK Albums Chart, becoming her fourth top 20 album in the country and her first since Whatever We Wanna in 2006. It is a significant improvement on her previous album, Spitfire, which peaked on the UK Chart at number 142.

== Track listing ==
Standard - Digital version
| No. | Title | Writer(s) | Producer(s) | Length |
|---|---|---|---|---|
| 1. | "The Story" | Phil Hanseroth | LeAnn Rimes; Darrell Brown; Mark Batson | 3:24 |
| 2. | "Love Line" | Rimes; Brown; Paul Barry | Rimes; Brown; Batson; Niko Bolas | 4:03 |
| 3. | "Outrageous Love" | Rimes; Brown; Toby Gad | Rimes; Brown; Batson; Bolas | 3:15 |
| 4. | "Mother" | Rimes; Brown; Batson | Rimes; Brown; Batson; Bolas | 3:59 |
| 5. | "Remnants" | Rimes; Brown; Batson | Rimes; Brown; Batson; Bolas | 3:22 |
| 6. | "Long Live Love" | Rimes; Brown; Batson | Rimes; Brown; Batson; Bolas | 3:19 |
| 7. | "How to Kiss a Boy" | Lori McKenna; Barry Dean | Rimes; Brown; Batson; Bolas | 4:27 |
| 8. | "Love Is Love Is Love" | Rimes; Brown; Lindy Robbins; Gad | Rimes; Brown; Batson; Bolas | 3:50 |
| 9. | "Learning Your Language" | Rimes; Brown; Gad | Rimes; Brown | 3:48 |
| 10. | "I Couldn't Do That to Me" | Diane Warren | Rimes; Brown; Batson; Bolas | 4:27 |
| 11. | "Humbled" | Rimes; Brown; Francis White | Rimes; Brown; Batson; Bolas | 3:07 |
| 12. | "Do It Wrong with Me" | Rimes; Brown | Rimes; Brown; Steve Jordan | 3:11 |
| 13. | "Dang Dang" | Rimes; Brown; Batson | Rimes; Brown; Batson; Bolas | 3:41 |
| Total length: | | | | 47:53 |

Standard - CD
| No. | Title | Writer(s) | Producer(s) | Length |
|---|---|---|---|---|
| 14. | "Give Me Something (I Can’t Give Myself)" | Rimes; Brown; John Hume | Rimes; Brown; Hume | 2:51 |
| Total length: | | | | 50:44 |

Digital deluxe edition bonus tracks
| No. | Title | Writer(s) | Length |
|---|---|---|---|
| 15. | "Love Line" (The Live Church Session) | Rimes; Brown; Barry | 3:36 |
| 16. | "How to Kiss a Boy" (The Live Church Session) | McKenna; Dean | 4:31 |
| 17. | "The Story" (The Live Church Session) | Hanseroth | 3:08 |
| Total length: | | | 61:59 |

== Personnel ==
Credits adapted from liner notes.

Musicians

- LeAnn Rimes – vocals, arrangements (1–11, 13)
- Darrell Brown – acoustic piano (1–8, 10–13), keyboards (1–13), arrangements (1–11, 13), additional keyboards (14)
- Mark Batson – acoustic piano (1–8, 10, 11, 13), keyboards (1–8, 10, 11, 13), arrangements (1–8, 10, 11, 13)
- Jon Hume – all instruments (14), arrangements (14)
- Michael Chaves – guitars (1–7, 9–13), bass guitar (9)
- Christopher Stills – guitars (1–7, 9–13)
- Greg Hagan – guitars (8)
- Ray Parker Jr. – guitars (12)
- Darryl Jones – bass guitar (1–8, 10, 11, 13)
- Willie Weeks – bass guitar (12)
- Vinnie Colaiuta – drums (1–8, 10, 11, 13)
- Trevor Lawrence Jr. – drums (9, 14)
- Steve Jordan – drums (12), arrangements (12)
- Chris Walden – string arrangements (1)
- Rob Moose – string arrangements (3, 4, 7)

Background vocals

- LeAnn Rimes
- Sophie Bellevue
- Darrell Brown
- Sharlotte Gibson
- Tiffany Palmer
- Elizabeth White

=== Production ===
- LeAnn Rimes – producer (1–11, 13)
- Darrell Brown – producer (1–11, 13)
- Mark Batson – producer (1–8, 10, 11, 13)
- Steve Jordan – producer (12)
- Jon Hume – producer (14)
- Niko Bolas – associate producer
- Cindi Peters – production coordinator
- Andy Hayes – design
- Steven Sebring – photography
- Kiki Caldas – personal assistant

Technical credits

- Stuart Hawkes – mastering (1) at Metropolis Mastering (London, UK)
- Greg Calbi – mastering (2–14) at Sterling Sound (New York City, New York)
- Ruadhri Cushnan – mixing
- Niko Bolas – recording (1–8, 10–13)
- Michael Chaves – recording (9), additional recording
- Trevor Lawrence Jr. – recording (9)
- Diego Ruelas – recording (9), additional recording
- Jon Hume – recording (14)
- Aaron Fessell – additional recording
- Steve Genewick – additional recording
- Chandler Harrod – additional recording, assistant engineer
- David Martinez – additional recording
- Joe Napolitano – additional recording
- Nick Rives – additional recording
- Jory Roberts – additional recording
- Alex Williams – assistant engineer
- Alessandro Di Camillo – mix assistant
- Darrell Brown – Pro Tools digital editing

== Charts ==
| Chart (2016–17) | Peak position |
|---|---|
| Australian Albums (ARIA) | 166 |
| Irish Albums (IRMA) | 71 |
| New Zealand Heatseekers Albums (RMNZ) | 7 |
| Scottish Albums (Official Charts) | 8 |
| UK Albums (Official Charts) | 15 |
| US Billboard 200 | 88 |
| US Independent Albums (Billboard) | 4 |
