= Melinda Doolittle (EP) =

Melinda Doolittle - EP

EP by Melinda Doolittle
- Released: June 12, 2007
- Recorded: March–May 2007
- Genre: Pop, rock, R&B, soul
- Label: 19 Entertainment; Fox Interactive Media

Melinda Doolittle chronology
Melinda Doolittle - EP (2007)	Coming Back to You (2009)

Melinda Doolittle - EP is an EP by American Idol season 6 third-place finisher Melinda Doolittle. Doolittle performed a song for the show each week of the season, and each song appeared on the show's website the day after the performance for sale as a studio version. The EP is a compilation of the five most downloaded of Doolittle's studio recordings, all of which are covers of other artists.

== Track listing ==
1. "As Long As He Needs Me"
2. "Home"
3. "I'm a Woman"
4. "Have a Nice Day"
5. "Trouble Is a Woman"
