= Kris Vanderheyden =

Belgian techno/electronic music producer

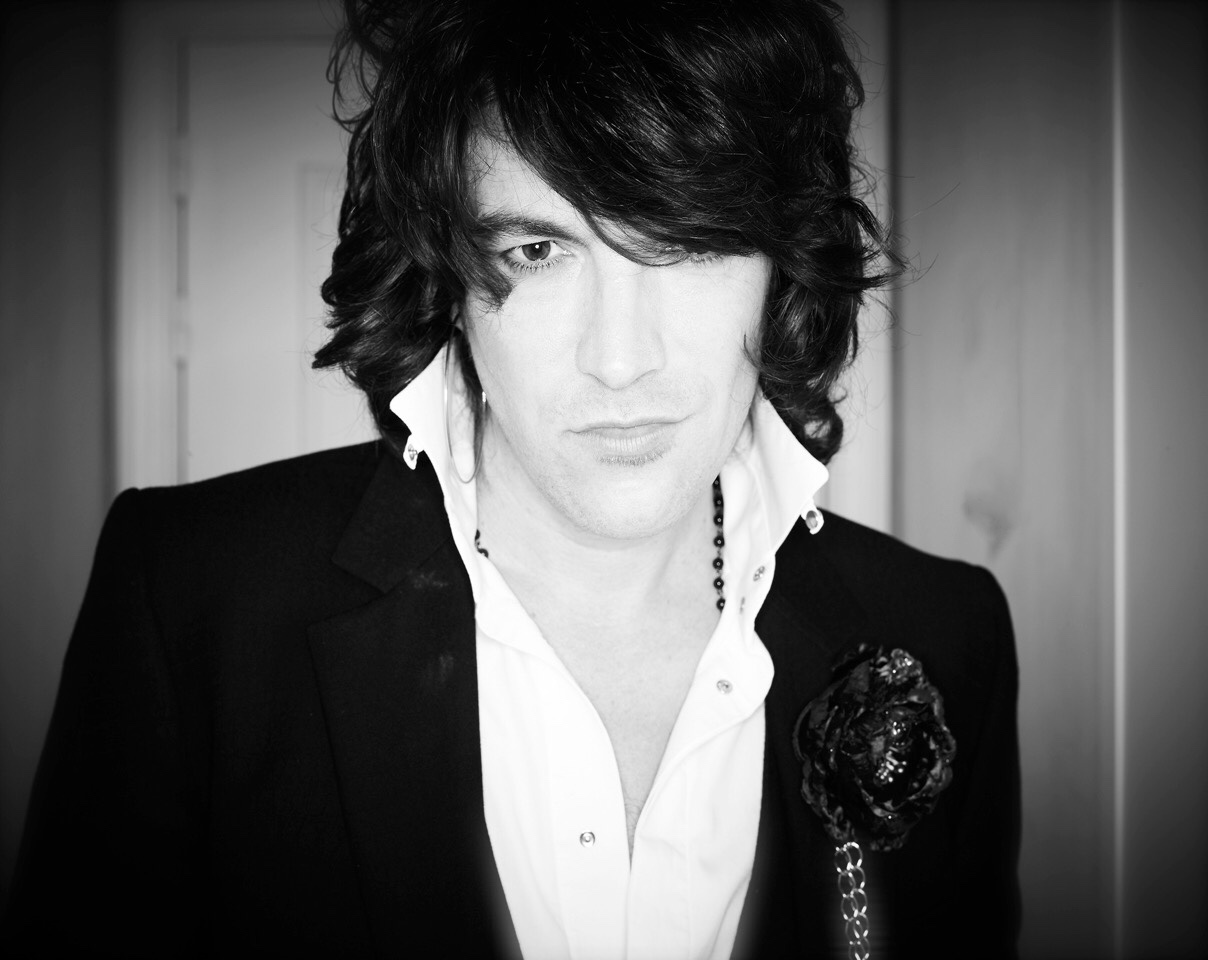
- Vanderheyden (year unknown)

Background information
- Also known as: Analyse, Atomic Fusion, Black Sphere, Christopher Z., Franky Stein & The Creeps, Hank Style, Insider, Jean-Francois Feqt, Kris Vanderheyden, Lhaes, M Wolleitzer, Spectrux, Spirit Solution, Techno Jesus, The Assistant, The Sound Lab
- Born: Halle, Belgium
- Genres: Techno, electronic music
- Occupation: Producer
- Years active: 1990–present
- Website: www.insider-music.com

Kris Vanderheyden (Halle, Belgium), known by his stage name as Insider, is a Belgian techno and electronic music producer. He is considered one of the leading pioneers of the Belgian originated techno electronic dance music scene.

He was born of a French mother and a Belgian father, a trumpet player who was a Latin music lover and owner of an enormous record collection with artists spanning from James Brown to Donna Summer and genres from Classical and Jazz to Zydeco.

While growing up, Vanderheyden spent most of his childhood with his grandmother and an uncle who was a fan of Led Zeppelin, Pink Floyd and The Sex Pistols. This mixture of musical genres came to influence his music career later in life.

At the age of 16, Vanderheyden took a position at a local record store in Halle Belgium called Eddy's Records where he became even more consumed with music. After saving enough money from his job, he bought his first synthesizer, a Roland W30 and started to compose his very own music in his bedroom.

== Music Man Records ==
After recording some early demos, Music Man Records offered Vanderheyden a recording contract. The initial release went well but it was his next release under his INSIDER moniker which became his first real breakthrough.

According to Vanderheyden, "I went to the owner of Music Man (Hessel Tieter) and said, 'If you give me a sizable advance to purchase more recording equipment, I will give you a hit record'. Hessel contacted Frank de Wulf to ask him for advice and he replied, 'Do It'. One week later, my song 'Destiny' was born".

Because "Destiny" was such a big hit and so ahead of its time, Vanderheyden was able to tour the world. He performed at the most prestigious events like Mayday and Dorian Grey across Europe. Vanderheyden also became the first Belgian artist to headline at New York City's famed The Limelight Club for controversial party promoter Lord Michael's Future Shock event.

== Bonzai Records ==
In 1994, Vanderheyden signed a deal with Bonzai Records where he recorded a string of hits. His most famous releases from that period are Boots On The Run as INSIDER and Noxius under the Tyrome moniker. To date, most of these songs are played on a regular basis by new and rising DJ's all over the world.

== London Records ==
In 1995, Vanderheyden wrote Sugar Is Sweeter and The Prophet, which ranked 11 and 19 on the UK Singles Chart respectively. The Armand Van Helden remix of Sugar Is Sweeter made it to #1 on the Billboard Hot Dance Club Songs Chart. The Prophet was a big underground hit as well.

== N.E.W.S. ==
Late 90's Kris signed a non-exclusive deal with NEWS Records where he released INSIDER's The Swarm, another big club hit.

== Minneapolis Years ==
Vanderheyden continued to perform globally, captivating audiences with his talent. In 2003, he made a significant move to Minneapolis to join his long-time hero Dr. Fink, an important member of Prince and The Revolution. Together, they collaborated on an album at the esteemed Paisley Park recording facility with Prince alumnus and saxophonist Eric Leeds. Despite their focused efforts and the synergy among the musicians, the album was never released, leaving fans to wonder about the potential masterpiece that never saw the light of day.

== Musical Masterpiece for the Hit Film "Zillion" ==
In 2022, Kris took on the monumental task of composing the soundtrack for the movie "Zillion," directed by Robin Pront and featuring Jonas Vermeulen and Matteo Simoni as the lead actors. The title track, "Black Magic," stands out as a pivotal element of the film, enhancing its narrative and emotional depth. Vanderheyden's ability to capture the essence of the film's atmosphere and translate it into music has been lauded by both critics and audiences alike. The film's near-million attendance in the Flemish part of Belgium has been celebrated as one of the best Belgian movies ever. His work on "Zillion" is a shining example of how a powerful soundtrack can transform a great film into an unforgettable masterpiece.

== Remixes-R&S-Cocoon Records ==
The last few years have seen Vanderheyden divide his time between Belgium, France and the United States, teaming up with a number of established music producers and mixers like producer Greg Cohen (John Legend, Lil Yachty, Nile Rodgers, Robin Thicke) on mixing, production and writing work for various major-label artists. Most recently, Vanderheyden again scored a couple of #1 positions on the Billboard Hot Dance Club Song Chart with his remix production work on Janet Jackson Made For Now and New Wave legends Blondie’s Fun.

Throughout the last two decades and presently, Vanderheyden continues to headline major summer and fall festivals most notably, Tomorrowland as INSIDER and Tyrome, among other related projects.

In the summer of 2019 Dark Purple was picked up by DJs Sam Paganini and Charlotte de Witte who played it throughout on all major festivals such as Awakenings, Drumcode and Kappa Future Festival.

In 2022, Kris Vanderheyden teamed up with Zzino to release the track "Mindcrush" on the renowned Cocoon label, helmed by label boss Sven Väth. This collaboration brought together two influential figures in the electronic music scene, resulting in a track that garnered widespread acclaim. "Mindcrush" exemplifies the innovative sound that Cocoon is known for.

In 2023, Vanderheyden made a return to R&S Records with his new release, "Something Flash" which marked a significant development in his career. "Something Flash" showcases Vanderheyden's signature sound, blending electronic beats with corresponding melodies. The release has been met with enthusiasm from fans and critics alike.

== Selected discography ==
Check discogs for complete list

Project	Title	Label	Year	Chart position
Insider	Destiny	Music Man Records	1991	
Insider	D.R.E.A.M.S	Music Man Records	1992	
Insider	Enter The Electra World	Steel Wheel	1995	
Dr. Jones & The Assistant	The Tripomatic EP	Onesider	1995	
C.J. Bolland	Sugar Is Sweeter	London Records	1996	UK #11
C.J. Bolland	Prophet	London Records	1997	UK #19
C.J. Bolland	The Analogue Theatre	London Records	1996	UK #43
Tyrome	Monkey - Way	Bonzai Trance Progressive	1997	
Tyrome	Electric Vodoo	Bonzai Trance Progressive	1998	
Insider	Boots On The Run	Bonzai Records	1998	
Insider	Estoril	Clockwork Recordings	1999	
Tyrome	Evolution	Dance Opera	1999	
Insider	Trial Bells	Bonzai Records	1999	
Punk City	Mission	ARS Productions	2001	
Tyrome	Bad Magic	Amendo	2002	
Quick Reverse	God's Reason	Bonzai Records	2016	
Blondie	Fun (Remixes)	BMG	2017	US #1; UK #2
Insider	Dark Purple	Mentala	2019	
Insider & ZZino	Mindcrush	Cocoon Records	2022	
Insider	Something Flash	R&S Records	2023	
