= Coming Back to You =

Studio album by Melinda Doolittle
- Released: February 3, 2009
- Genre: R&B, Soul
- Length: 45:25
- Label: Hi Fi Recordings
- Producer: Michael Mangini

Melinda Doolittle chronology
Melinda Doolittle (2007)	Coming Back to You (2009)	You're the Reason (2013)

Professional ratings
Review scores
Source	Rating
Allmusic	link
Entertainment Weekly	(B+) link
People	3.5/4 stars
PopMatters	(7/10) link
Slant	link
The New York Times	(positive) link
Vibe	(positive) link

Coming Back to You is the title of Melinda Doolittle's first album, released on February 3, 2009. The album consists of covers such as "Dust My Broom" from the 1930s, "Wonderful", from Aretha Franklin's 2003 release So Damn Happy, "Declaration of Love" from Celine Dion's 1996 release Falling into You and the title track, originally recorded by Macy Gray for the film Déjà Vu.

The album debuted at number 58 on the Billboard 200 on its first week of release, selling just over 10,900 copies.

Doolittle made her first promotional appearance for the album on The Ellen DeGeneres Show where she performed "It's Your Love."

The cover is reminiscent of The Freewheelin' Bob Dylan.

== Track listing ==
1. "Fundamental Things" (David Batteau)- 3:19
2. "It's Your Love" (Harry Bass & Stanley Ossman)- 2:45
3. "Coming Back to You" (Phillip White, Macy Gray, Freddie Moffett and Harry Gregson-Williams)- 3:05
4. "Declaration of Love" (Claude Gaudette)- 4:02
5. "The Best of Everything" (Sammy Cahn)- 3:34
6. "Wonderful" - (Phillip White, Ron Lawrence, Katrina Willis and Aleese Simmons) 3:05
7. "Dust My Broom" (Robert Johnson)- 2:44
8. "I'll Never Stop Loving You" (Sammy Cahn)- 3:04
9. "I Will Be" (Bob Farrell and Tanya Leah)- 3:54
10. "If I'm Not In Love" (Constant Change)- 4:29
11. "Walkin' Blues" (Robert Johnson)- 2:47
12. "We Will Find a Way" (Susan Sheridan)- 4:23
13. "Wonder Why" (Sammy Cahn) - 4:14

=== Walmart bonus track ===
1. "Through the Fire" (David Foster, Tom Keane, Cynthia Weil) *Walmart Exclusive Bonus Track

== Personnel ==
- Raymond Angry – keyboards
- Howie Beno – engineer, string arrangements, mixing
- Cindy Blackman – drums
- Michael Blanton – executive producer
- John Chudoba – horn section
- Chris Gehringer – mastering
- David Hamilton – string arrangements
- Frank Harkins – art direction
- Russ Harrington – photography
- Bill Harris Quintet – horn
- Tom "Bones" Malone – horn arrangements, horn section
- Michael Mangini – producer, string arrangements, mixing
- Adam Pallin – bass, guitar, programming, horn arrangements, string arrangements
- Bill Porricelli – executive producer
- Tom Timko – horn section
- John Titta – executive producer
