= Lady & Gentlemen =

Studio album by LeAnn Rimes
- Released: September 27, 2011
- Recorded: 2010–2011
- Genre: Country
- Length: 47:19
- Label: Curb
- Producers: Vince Gill, Darrell Brown, LeAnn Rimes

LeAnn Rimes chronology
Family (2007)	Lady & Gentlemen (2011)	Spitfire (2013)

Singles from Lady and Gentlemen
- 1. "Swingin'" Released: June 8, 2010; 2. "Crazy Women" Released: December 10, 2010; 3. "Give" Released: June 14, 2011

Lady & Gentlemen is the twelfth studio album by American singer LeAnn Rimes. The album is Rimes' second cover album (the first being her self-titled album). The only new songs on the album are the two bonus tracks, "Crazy Women" and "Give". It was released on September 27, 2011, by Curb Records. Rimes co-produced the album with country singer, Vince Gill, and Darrell Brown, with whom she collaborated on her 2007 album Family. A vinyl record of the album was released on the same day.

== Background ==
Lady & Gentlemen consists of Rimes covering songs by male country artists, including Vince Gill, who helped produce the album, Merle Haggard, Kris Kristofferson, and Waylon Jennings. Rimes also "revisited" her 1996 debut single, "Blue" on the album, which she picked up the tempo on. The album was released on September 27, 2011, by Curb Records. A vinyl record of the album was released on the same day. Rimes co-produced the album with country singer, Vince Gill, and Darrell Brown, of whom she collaborated with on her 2007 album Family.

== Singles ==
Three singles were released from the album. The first single released for the album was a cover of John Anderson's 1983 single, "Swingin'" on June 8, 2010. The second single, "Crazy Women", was released on December 10, 2010. A third single, "Give", was released on June 14, 2011.

== Critical reception ==
Professional ratings
Aggregate scores
Source	Rating
Metacritic	(75/100)
Review scores
Source	Rating
AllMusic	3.5/5 stars
Entertainment Weekly	B
Los Angeles Times	3/4 stars
The New York Times	(favorable)
Slant Magazine	3.5/5 stars

Lady & Gentlemen received mostly positive reviews from most music critics. So far it has been given a score of 75 out of 100 from Metacritic. AllMusic editor Stephen Thomas Erlewine gave it 3.5 out of 5 stars and called it "a collection of masculine country classics reinterpreted by a female singer." Mikael Wood of Entertainment Weekly stated that the album "rarely sheds new light on the top-shelf material." Jonathan Keefe of Slant Magazine compared the album to Tanya Tucker's 2009 album, My Turn and stated that album finds Rimes "taking real risks and making better music than many of her contemporaries." Randy Lewis of the Los Angeles Times claimed that Rimes "has been contending lately with flak from image-conscious types over paparazzi photos of her slimmed-down physique, but her leaner, meaner approach to a batch of classic country songs for her latest collection is mostly good news." Ben Ratliff of The New York Times stated that Rimes "can finally ease up on her default vocal style, brassy and belting, which is of course its own gender role."

== Track listing ==
No.	Title	Writer(s)	Original artist	Length
1.	"Swingin'"	John Anderson, Lionel Delmore	John Anderson	3:02
2.	"Wasted Days and Wasted Nights"	Wayne Duncan, Freddy Fender, Huey P. Meaux	Freddy Fender	4:06
3.	"The Only Mama That'll Walk the Line"	Jimmy Bryant	Jim Alley	2:39
4.	"I Can't Be Myself"	Merle Haggard	Merle Haggard and the Strangers	3:12
5.	"Sixteen Tons"	Merle Travis	Merle Travis	2:42
6.	"Help Me Make It Through the Night"	Kris Kristofferson	Kris Kristofferson	3:01
7.	"Rose Colored Glasses"	John Conlee, George Baber	John Conlee	3:06
8.	"A Good Hearted Woman"	Waylon Jennings, Willie Nelson	Waylon Jennings	3:40
9.	"When I Call Your Name"	Vince Gill, Tim DuBois	Vince Gill	3:41
10.	"He Stopped Loving Her Today"	Bobby Braddock, Curly Putman	George Jones	3:51
11.	"Blue" (with The Time Jumpers)	Bill Mack	Bill Mack	2:34
12.	"The Bottle Let Me Down"	Haggard	Merle Haggard and the Strangers	3:49

Bonus tracks
No.	Title	Writer(s)	Length
13.	"Crazy Women"	Brandy Clark, Jessie Jo Dillon, Shane McAnally	3:25
14.	"Give"	Connie Harrington, Sonya Isaacs, Jimmy Yeary	4:31
Total length:			47:19

== Personnel ==
Credits for Lady & Gentlemen adapted from liner notes.

- Ben Fowler — additional recording
- Brian Scheuble — additional engineering
- Darrell Brown — executive producer, producer, arrangement, additional engineering
- Chris Galland — assistant alternate mixing
- Drew Bollman — recording
- Erik Madrid — assistant alternate mixing
- Jenny Gill — production assistant
- John Hobbs — producer
- Joshua Blanchard — assistant engineering
- Justin Neibank — producer, mixer, recording
- LeAnn Rimes — executive producer, producer, arrangement
- Leigh Brannon — production assistant
- Manny Marroquin — alternate mixing
- Matt Rausch — assistant recording
- Paul Smith — assistant recording
- Ryder Brown — engineering intern
- The Time Jumpers — band*
- Vince Gill — producer, arrangement**

Notes

- * The Time Jumpers appear courtesy of The Crosswind Music Group
- **Vince Gill appears courtesy of MCA Nashville.

== Charts ==
=== Album ===
Chart (2011)	Peak position
Australian Albums (ARIA)	154
Australian Top Country Albums	16
Scottish Albums (Official Charts)	72
UK Albums (Official Charts)	96
UK Top Country Albums	2
US Billboard 200	32
US Top Country Albums (Billboard)	7

=== Singles ===
Year	Single	Peak chart positions	
Year	Single	US Country	US Dance
2010	"Swingin'"	57	—
2010	"Crazy Women"	40	—
2011	"Give"	47	11
"—" denotes releases that did not chart
