= Hi Fi Recordings =

New York record label

Hi Fi Recordings is a record label based in New York which first gained attention in June 2009 when it announced that it would release Adam Lambert's debut album, to be called On with the Show. Hi Fi had previously released American Idol finalist Melinda Doolittle's debut CD, Coming Back to You, as well as Todd Rundgren's Arena. The label also has veteran acts such as Dionne Warwick, Smash Mouth, Avril Lavigne, and Donny & Marie Osmond signed.

Hi Fi Recordings was founded by John Hecker in Los Angeles, California
