= Nothin' Better to Do =

Single by LeAnn Rimes

from the album Family
- B-side: "Probably Wouldn't Be This Way"
- Released: May 29, 2007
- Genre: Country
- Length: 4:25
- Label: Curb
- Songwriter(s): Darrell Brown; LeAnn Rimes; Dean Sheremet
- Producer(s): Dann Huff

LeAnn Rimes singles chronology
"Some People" (2006)	"Nothin' Better to Do" (2007)	"Good Friend and a Glass of Wine" (2008)

Music video
- "Nothin' Better to Do" on YouTube

"Nothin' Better to Do" is a song recorded by American country music artist LeAnn Rimes. The song was written by Darrell Brown, Rimes, and her then-husband Dean Sheremet. It was released on May 29, 2007, as the lead single to her ninth studio album Family (2007) by Curb Records.

The song peaked at number 14 on the US Hot Country Songs chart. With "Nothin' Better to Do", Rimes became the first artist to have a single simultaneously chart on Billboard's Hot Country Songs, Adult Contemporary, and Dance Club Songs charts. It was nominated at the 50th Annual Grammy Awards in 2008 for Best Female Country Vocal Performance.

== Content ==
"Nothin' Better to Do" (2007)
Rimes's "Nothin' Better to Do" from Family.

"Nothin' Better to Do" is an up-tempo song, backed by primarily by acoustic guitar and banjo. The song's female narrator, a young Mississippi woman, describes being a restless lover, running around with some boys. Her mom expresses her disapproval of her daughter's behavior, but the narrator believes there is "nothin' better to do."

Rimes co-wrote the song with musician Darrell Brown and then-husband Dean Sheremet.

== Track listing ==
Digital Download Remix EP

1. Nothin' Better to Do (Bimbo Jones Radio Edit) 3:03
2. Nothin' Better to Do (Soul Seekerz Radio Edit) 3:19
3. Nothin' Better to Do (Bimbo Jones Mix) 7:56
4. Nothin' Better to Do (Soul Seekerz Extended Mix) 7:51
5. Nothin' Better to Do (Soul Seekerz Dub Vocal Mix) 7:51
6. Nothin' Better to Do (Jason Nevins Club Electro Dub) 6:53
7. Strong (Cicada Mix) 7:17

UK CD single

1. Nothin' Better to Do 3:51
2. Probably Wouldn't Be This Way (Dann Huff Remix) 3:42

== Music video ==
The music video, which was co-directed by Rimes with David McClister, was released in May 2007. In the video, Rimes is shown in a Women's Correctional Facility, performing choreography with fellow inmates and singing into an old-fashioned microphone. This leads up to a prison break, which is led by Rimes; she is the only inmate to escape, but she is stopped in the prison yard shortly after when the gate closes. This video was her directorial debut.

== Charts ==
"Nothin' Better to Do" debuted at number 55 on the U.S. Billboard Hot Country Songs chart; it was a Top 20 hit, reaching a peak of number 14 in December 2007. The song also experienced some crossover success, reaching the Top 20 on the U.S. Billboard Hot Adult Contemporary Tracks chart and the Top 10 on the U.S. Billboard Hot Dance Club Play chart. Additionally, it reached number 48 on the UK Singles Chart.

Chart (2007–2008)	Peak position
Canada Country (Billboard)	25
UK Singles (OCC)	48
US Billboard Hot 100	73
US Adult Contemporary (Billboard)	16
US Hot Country Songs (Billboard)	14
US Dance Club Songs (Billboard)	8
