= You Are the Reason (disambiguation) =

"You Are the Reason" is a 2017 song by Calum Scott.

You Are the Reason may refer to:

- "You Are the Reason", a song by Air Supply from Yours Truly, 2001
- "You Are the Reason", a song by Katrine Lukins, competing to represent Latvia in the Eurovision Song Contest 2014
- The Reason, a song recorded by Celine Dion in 1997.

== See also ==
- You're the Reason (disambiguation)
- You Are the Reason Tour, by sombr
