= Long Time (Blondie song) =

Single by Blondie

from the album Pollinator
- B-side: "The Breaks"
- Released: March 24, 2017
- Recorded: 2016
- Genre: Pop rock; new wave
- Length: 4:35
- Label: BMG; Infectious Music
- Songwriter(s): Deborah Harry; Dev Hynes
- Producer(s): John Congleton

Blondie singles chronology
"Fun" (2017)	"Long Time" (2017)	"Too Much" (2017)

"Long Time" is a song by the American rock band Blondie, co-written with Blood Orange's Dev Hynes. It was released as the second single from their eleventh studio album Pollinator on March 24, 2017, on all major online platforms. The single was backed with non-album track "The Breaks".

== Release and reception ==
Promotion for the single started in the UK with first radio play on BBC Radio 2's Ken Bruce show on March 21, announced the previous night on Blondie's official social networks. The very same day they uploaded the audio track on the band's official YouTube account. The single (digital download and 2000 copies limited edition 7") was released on March 24. It debuted at number 9 in the UK Vinyl Singles Chart Top 40. It also debuted at number 18 in the UK Physical Chart Top 100 and climbed the following week to number 1, as did it on the Official Vinyl Singles Chart.

"Long Time" was praised by music critics, who highlighted the euphoric fresh modern-disco sound and effective chorus. Critics also remarked a deliberate similitude with 1979s chart-topper "Heart of Glass", although it "never feels like a mere rehash" and shows "a future brighter than fans had any right to expect. It's the best Blondie song in ages and a joy to behold". Jon Blistein (Rolling Stone) said "Long Time" "captures Blondie's signature disco-tinged punk sound with a big mix of synths and guitars that pulse beneath a rush of cymbals".

On April 19, the music video for "Long Time" was released via The Telegraph and later uploaded on YouTube. According to the accompanying information, it was shot in New York City and directed by Dikayl Rimmasch, who previously made the video for "Fun". The music videos for "Long Time" along with "Fun" were produced by Good Company, a production company based out of New York. The video consists of short fast-paced takes of the band rehearsing, playing and walking around the city, mixed with Debbie Harry driving a taxi-cab with BLND3 on the top of it. On the day the video came out the single was added to the top of the A-List on BBC Radio 2.

Blondie performed the song on a variety of TV and radio shows, such as Later… with Jools Holland (BBC Two), The One Show (BBC One), The Chris Evans Breakfast Show (BBC Radio 2) and Tonight At The London Palladium (ITV).

The song is featured in the video game Pro Evolution Soccer 2018.

== Track listings ==
Digital download
No.	Title	Writer(s)	Length
1.	"Long Time"	Deborah Harry, Dev Hynes	4:35

7-inch single
No.	Title	Writer(s)	Length
1.	"Long Time"	Deborah Harry, Dev Hynes	4:35
2.	"The Breaks"	Chris Stein, Deborah Harry	4:15

Digital remixes
No.	Title	Writer(s)	Length
1.	"Long Time (Hercules & Love Affair Remix Edit)"	Deborah Harry, Dev Hynes	3:52
2.	"Long Time (Johnson Somerset Remix Edit)"	Deborah Harry, Dev Hynes	3:56

=== Official remixes ===
- Hercules & Love Affair Remix
- Hercules & Love Affair Radio Edit
- Eric Kupper Remix
- Eric Kupper Dub
- Eric Kupper Radio Edit
- Joe Gauthreaux Remix
- Joe Gauthreaux Dub
- Joe Gauthreaux Radio
- Johnson Somerset Remix
- Johnson Somerset Dub
- Johnson Somerset Radio

== Charts ==
Chart (2017)	Peak position
UK Official Physical Singles (OCC)	1
UK Official Vinyl Singles (OCC)	1
US Dance Club Songs (Billboard)	5
US Adult Alternative Songs (Billboard)	19
Mexico Ingles Airplay (Billboard)	45
Belgium (Wallonia) Ultratip	57
