= Against the Odds: 1974–1982 =

Box set by Blondie
- Released: August 26, 2022
- Genre: Rock
- Length: 2:52:26
- Labels: UMC; Numero Group; Capitol

Blondie chronology
Vivir en La Habana (2021)	Against the Odds: 1974–1982 (2022)	High Noon (2027)

Against the Odds: 1974–1982 is a box set by the American rock band Blondie, released on August 26, 2022 by UMC (a subsidiary of Universal Music Group), the Numero Group and Capitol Records. The band has endorsed the box set.

== Reception ==
Professional ratings
Aggregate scores
Source	Rating
Metacritic	92/100
Review scores
Source	Rating
AllMusic	4.5/5 stars
American Songwriter	'
Classic Rock	4.5/5 stars
Paste	8.8/10
Pitchfork	8.5/10
PopMatters	10/10

According to the review aggregator Metacritic, Against the Odds 1974-1982 received "universal acclaim" based on a weighted average score of 92 out of 100 from 8 critic scores.

Writing for AllMusic, Stephen Thomas Erlewine called it a "comprehensive complete chronology", noting that "these demos, abandoned ideas, and working mixes help to add a dimension and perspective to Blondie's basic canon." concluding by noting that "Those original albums and, especially, the big hits are so familiar that they can seem set in stone, but when they're paired with these raw, unheard recordings, the group's nervy, arty spirit is resurrected, so it's possible to once again understand what made Blondie such a striking, special band at their peak." Pitchfork critic Caryn Rose wrote it is "Blondie’s first archival presentation of their essential years", stating that "Against the Odds perfectly captures the band’s legacy precisely because it presents the history, music, and memories with an admirable degree of honesty and doesn’t try to make the story into something it wasn’t."

In 2023, the album was nominated for Best Historical Album at the Grammys.

== Contents ==
The deluxe edition of the set includes the following studio albums, with bonus tracks:

- Blondie (1976)
- Plastic Letters (1977)
- Parallel Lines (1978)
- Eat to the Beat (1979)
- Autoamerican (1980)
- The Hunter (1982)

Both the standard and deluxe editions include previously unreleased demos and outtakes. On the deluxe CD set, 17 tracks are compiled on two discs, titled Out in the Streets and Home Tapes.

The deluxe vinyl set includes Out in the Streets and Home Tapes on separate 10″ and 12″ discs, respectively, with "Mr. Sightseer" moved from the latter to a separate 7″ single, backing "Moonlight Drive". The standard edition combines the two albums, including "Mr. Sightseer", onto one disc, while "Moonlight Drive" is moved to Plaza Sound. Both editions compile 34 additional tracks across three further discs: Plaza Sound, Parallel Beats, and Coca-Cola. The deluxe CD set instead adds these 35 tracks (including "Moonlight Drive") as bonus tracks on their respective albums' discs.

The standard CD set likewise consists of all 52 bonus tracks, while the standard vinyl set contains 47, with both slightly altering the running order.

=== Track listings ===
Out in the Streets track listing
No.	Title	Writer(s)	Length
1.	"Out in the Streets" (1974 session)	Jeff Barry; Ellie Greenwich	2:24
2.	"The Disco Song (Note: "The Disco Song" and "Once I Had a Love" were both working titles for "Heart of Glass".)" (1974 session)	Debbie Harry; Chris Stein	3:56
3.	"Sexy Ida" (1974 session)	Tina Turner	3:59
4.	"Platinum Blonde" (Betrock demo)	Harry	2:18
5.	"The Thin Line" (Betrock demo)	Harry; Stein	2:27
6.	"Puerto Rico" (Betrock demo)	Harry; Stein	2:08
7.	"Once I Had a Love (Note: Omitted from the standard vinyl edition.)" (Betrock demo (Note: The Betrock demos of "Once I Had a Love" and "Out in the Streets" are referred to as "1975" on the deluxe vinyl and standard CD editions.))	Harry; Stein	3:58
8.	"Out in the Streets" (Betrock demo)	Barry; Greenwich	2:21

Home Tapes track listing
No.	Title	Writer(s)	Length
1.	"Nameless" (home tape)	Stein	1:42
2.	"Mr. Sightseer (Note: Omitted from the deluxe vinyl edition, where it is moved to a 7″ single.)"	Harry; Stein	3:45
3.	"Sunday Girl" (home tape)	Harry; Stein	2:50
4.	"Theme from Topkapi" (home tape)	Manos Hadjidakis	2:57
5.	"The Hardest Part" (home tape)	Harry; Stein	3:32
6.	"Ring of Fire" (home tape)	June Carter Cash; Merle Kilgore (Note: Kilgore is uncredited.)	2:48
7.	"Heart of Glass" (Chris Stein mix)	Harry; Stein	6:14
8.	"Call Me" (Chris Stein mix)	Harry; Giorgio Moroder	5:15
9.	"War Child" (Chris Stein mix)	Nigel Harrison; Harry	5:20

Plaza Sound track listing
No.	Title	Writer(s)	Length
1.	"X Offender" (intro)	Harry; Gary Valentine	0:17
2.	"X Offender" (Private Stock single version)	Harry; Valentine	3:14
3.	"In the Sun" (Private Stock single version)	Stein	2:40
4.	"Little Girl Lies" (Private Stock mix)	Harry	2:08
5.	"In the Flesh" (extended intro)	Harry; Stein	2:51
6.	"A Shark in Jet's Clothing" (take 2)	Jimmy Destri	3:42
7.	"Kung Fu Girls" (take 8)	Destri; Harry; Valentine	2:27
8.	"Scenery" (Plaza Sound outtake)	Valentine	3:09
9.	"Denis" (Terry Ellis mix)	Neil Levenson	2:22
10.	"Bermuda Triangle Blues – Flight 45" (take 1)	Stein	2:38
11.	"Moonlight Drive"	The Doors	3:00
12.	"I Didn't Have the Nerve to Say No" (take 1)	Destri; Harry	2:59
13.	"I'm on E" (take 2)	Harry; Stein	2:37
14.	"Kidnapper" (take 2)	Destri	2:32
15.	"Detroit 442" (take 2)	Destri; Stein	2:56
16.	"Poet's Problem"	Destri	2:21

Parallel Beats track listing
No.	Title	Writer(s)	Length
1.	"Once I Had a Love" (Mike Chapman demo)	Harry; Stein	3:18
2.	"Sunday Girl" (French version)	Stein	3:14
3.	"I'll Never Break Away From This Heart of Mine (Pretty Baby)" (take 1)	Harry; Stein	3:36
4.	"Hanging on the Telephone" (Mike Chapman demo)	Jack Lee	2:20
5.	"Will Anything Happen" (instrumental)	Lee	2:54
6.	"Underground Girl"	Frank Infante	3:53
7.	"Call Me"	Harry; Moroder	3:32
8.	"Spaghetti Song (Atomic Pt. 2)"	Destri; Harry	2:06
9.	"Die Young Stay Pretty" (take 1)		3:36
10.	"Union City Blue" (instrumental)	Harrison; Harry	2:51
11.	"Llámame (Note: "Llámame" is the Spanish version of "Call Me".)"	Harry; Moroder	6:18

Coca-Cola track listing
No.	Title	Writer(s)	Length
1.	"I Love You Honey, Give Me a Beer (Go Through It)"	Harry; Stein	2:42
2.	"Live It Up" (Giorgio Moroder demo)	Stein	4:03
3.	"Angels on the Balcony" (Giorgio Moroder demo)	Laura Davis; Destri	4:17
4.	"The Tide Is High" (demo)	Howard Barrett; Tyrone Evans; John Holt (Note: Incorrectly credited to Debbie Harry and Chris Stein.)	3:59
5.	"Susie & Jeffrey"	Harry; Stein	4:09
6.	"Rapture" (disco version)		10:00
7.	"Autoamerican Ad"		1:07
8.	"Yuletide Throwdown"	Fred Braithwaite; Harry; Stein	4:49

== Charts ==
Chart (2022)	Peak position
Belgian Albums (Ultratop Flanders)	40
Belgian Albums (Ultratop Wallonia)	26
French Albums (SNEP)	127
German Albums (Offizielle Top 100)	16
Scottish Albums (Official Charts)	5
Swiss Albums (Schweizer Hitparade)	28
UK Albums (Official Charts)	25
US Top Album Sales (Billboard)	68
