= You're the Reason (EP) =

EP by Melinda Doolittle
- Released: November 12, 2013
- Genre: Pop, R&B, soul
- Length: 28:12
- Label: Sonador Entertainment
- Producer: Tre' Corley, Melinda Doolittle, Paul Corley

Melinda Doolittle chronology
Coming Back to You (2009)	You're the Reason (2013)

You're the Reason is the title of Melinda Doolittle's second album, released on November 12, 2013. The EP features original material co-authored by Doolittle, and covers, "Give" and "Home."

== Reception ==
USA Today said of the release "The new material doesn't rely on the same old-school soul of 2009's Coming Back to You, but there's a snap and crackle not only in the funky grooves of You're the Reason, but in the live-wire energy of Doolittle's delivery." SoulTracks.com said "You're the Reason is a revealing album right from the start...Doolittle is an artist who faced doubts but who emerged with her vision and spirit intact, and who is determined to sing the type of music that she loves - whether singing originals or covers. Her passion for the decision she made shows through on the disc and makes this a welcome, successful return of an Idol favorite."

== Track listing ==
1. "Never Giving Up" (Melinda Doolittle, Jonathan Lee, Tre' Corley)- 3:39
2. "Without You" (Doolittle, Corley)- 3:29
3. "You're The Reason (U.R.Y.)" (Doolittle, Corley)- 3:49
4. "Give" (Connie Harrington, Sonya Isaacs, Jimmy Yeary)- 4:07
5. "I Believe In Love" (Michael Ricks, Randy Davis)- 4:23
6. "You're The Reason (U.R.Y.) - Extended Version feat. W.I.T." - (Doolittle, Corley) 5:27

=== Bonus track ===
1. "Home" (Charlie Smalls)- 3:28

== Personnel ==
- Tre' Corley – executive producer, keys, drums, programming, arrangements, mastering
- Paul Corley - executive producer, engineer, mixing
- Andy Corley & Frankie Chew - assistant engineers
- Melinda Doolittle - executive producer, bgv arrangements
- Austin Loftis – guitar
- Jeremy Medkiff – guitar
- Duncan Mullins – bass
- Anthony Matula – art direction
- Anthony Matula – photography
- Michael Heitzler – exclusive management
- Oak Tree Studios – recording & mixing location
