= Melinda Doolittle =

American singer

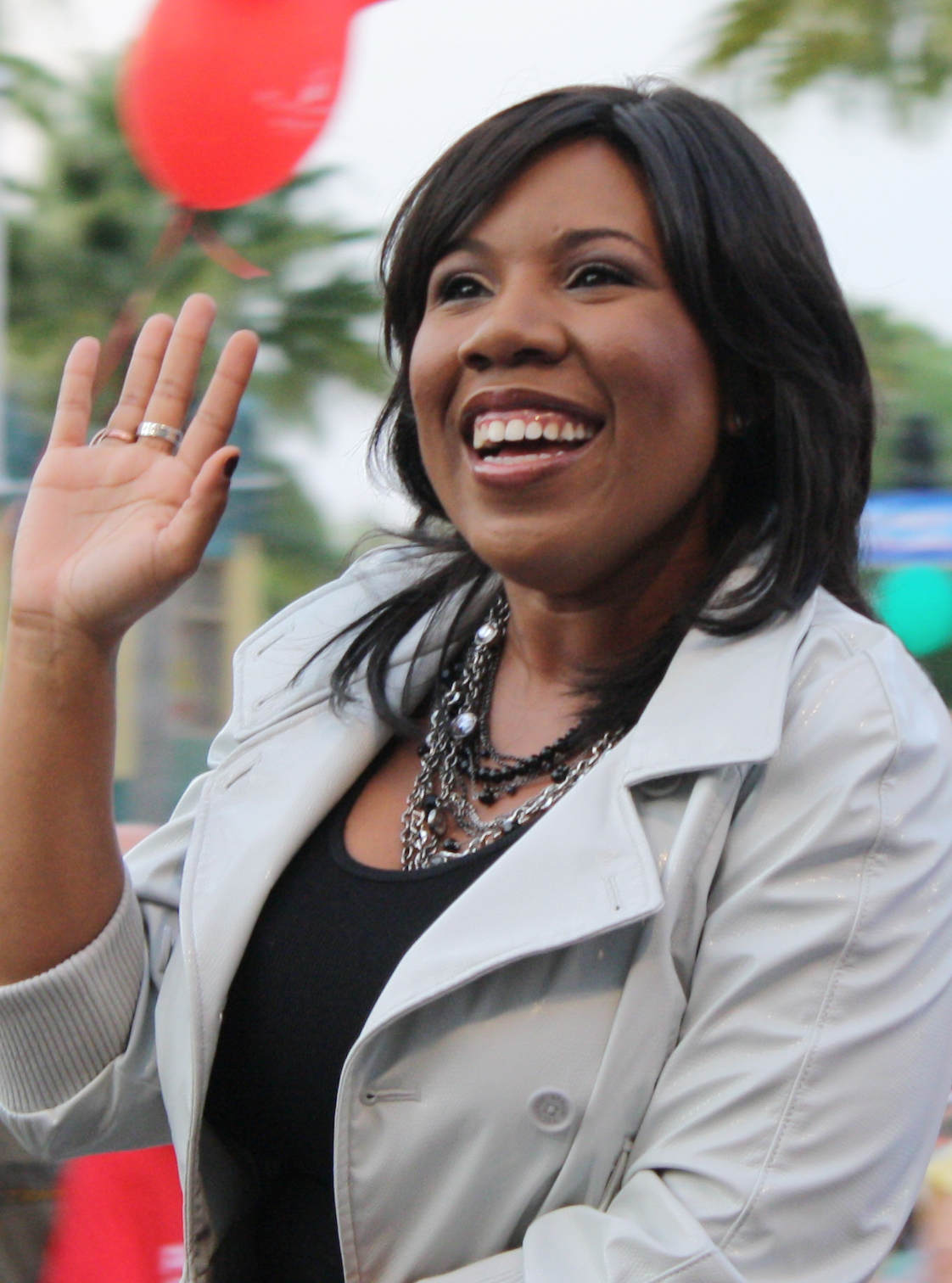
- Melinda Doolittle in The American Idol Experience motorcade at Walt Disney World

Background information
- Born: Melinda Marie Doolittle; October 6, 1977 (age 49); St. Louis, Missouri, U.S.
- Origin: Brentwood, Tennessee, U.S.
- Genres: Gospel, soul, R&B
- Occupations: Singer, backup singer
- Years active: 1999–present
- Labels: MPCA (2007–2011); Hi Fi Recordings (2008–2011)
- Website: www.melindadoolittle.com

Melinda Marie Doolittle (born October 6, 1977) is an American singer who finished as the third place finalist on the sixth season of American Idol. Prior to her appearance on American Idol, Doolittle worked as a professional back-up singer for, among others, Michael McDonald, Kirk Franklin, Aaron Neville, BeBe and CeCe Winans, Alabama, Jonny Lang, Vanessa Bell Armstrong, Carman, and Anointed.

== Personal life ==
Doolittle was born in St. Louis, Missouri to Steve and Marguerite Duke Doolittle but considers Brentwood, Tennessee to be home; her Homecoming was held there after she made the Top 3 on American Idol season 6.

She graduated from Union High School in Tulsa, Oklahoma, in 1995.

When Doolittle told her mom that she wanted to sing at a youth group talent show, her mom searched for the right words that were honest yet not going to crush her daughter's dreams. "The first thing my mom said was, ‘Baby, you’re going to have to pray – HARD,'" says Doolittle, "and that is what I did." For a month, she prayed harder than she had ever prayed before and she practiced and practiced. "The night of the talent show, I got to the youth group," says Doolittle, "My youth pastor had heard me sing before and he knew the potential for disaster but he still believed in me. When I walked onto the stage I heard the music start, I closed my eyes and opened my mouth and a different voice came out." Miraculously she sang with perfect pitch that night and brought down the house. She then realized that her life could be much bigger than she realized. From that point on not only could Doolittle sing but she could hear harmonies.

Although she has been singing since the seventh grade, her professional career did not begin until 1999. She was a music major at Belmont University. Since college, her vocal instruction has been provided by Janet Kenyon.

== American Idol ==
=== Audition ===
Doolittle first auditioned for American Idol in Memphis, Tennessee. She went down to Memphis with some friends who were auditioning and decided to audition for fun. She sang the song "For Once in My Life", which was popularized by one of her favorite artists, Stevie Wonder. Her audition received positive feedback from all three judges, although they expressed concern about the nerves she had exhibited and told her to believe in herself.

=== Semi-finals ===
Doolittle managed to secure herself a spot in the Top 24, who all performed on national television. During her first broadcast performance, Doolittle was highly praised for her rendition of "Sweet Sweet Baby (Since You’ve Been Gone)", by Aretha Franklin. The following week, Doolittle pulled off another winning performance with the song "My Funny Valentine". According to the judges, it was "without question the best vocal of the night.", and it ranked number three in AOL Top 20 Idol Performances. Simon called the performance "incredible" and Paula called it "just astounding...You phrased that song so beautifully, so differently...I applaud you." For her last semi-final performance, Doolittle performed the song "I'm a Woman", causing Simon Cowell to call her "a little tiger," continuing: "I thought we had a pussycat." On March 8, 2007, Doolittle made it into the show's Top 12.

=== Finals ===
Doolittle received very consistent praise from the judges for her performances and was never in a bottom two or three prior to her elimination. She was eliminated on May 16, 2007, and finished in third place. Simon Cowell later stated he believed she should have won.

== American Idol performances ==
Week #	Theme #	Song choice	Original artist	Order #	Result
Top 24 (12 Women)	N/A	"(Sweet Sweet Baby) Since You've Been Gone"	Aretha Franklin	9	Safe
Top 20 (10 Women)	N/A	"My Funny Valentine"	Mitzi Green	4	Safe
Top 16 (8 Women)	N/A	"I'm a Woman"	Christine Kittrell	8	Safe
Top 12	Diana Ross	"Home"	Stephanie Mills	2	Safe
Top 11	British Invasion	"As Long As He Needs Me"	From the musical Oliver!	11	Safe
Top 10	No Doubt/Artist who inspire Gwen Stefani	"Heaven Knows"	Donna Summer	7	Safe
Top 9	American Classics	"I Got Rhythm"	From the musical Girl Crazy	3	Safe^{1}
Top 8	Latin	"Sway"	Dean Martin	1	Safe
Top 7	Country	"Trouble Is a Woman"	Julie Reeves	6	Safe
Top 6	Inspirational	"There Will Come a Day"	Faith Hill	2	Safe
Top 6^{2}	Bon Jovi	"Have A Nice Day"	Bon Jovi	6	Safe
Top 4	Barry Gibb	"Love You Inside Out" "How Can You Mend A Broken Heart?"	Bee Gees	1; 5	Safe
Top 3	Judge's Choice (Randy Jackson); Producers' Choice; Contestant's Choice	"I Believe in You and Me" "Nutbush City Limits" "I'm a Woman"	Four Tops; Tina Turner; Christine Kittrell	3; 6; 9	Eliminated

- ^Note 1 When Ryan Seacrest announced the results for this particular night, Doolittle was declared safe placing in the top three.
- ^Note 2 Due to the Idol Gives Back performance, the Top 6 remained intact for another week.

== Post-Idol ==
Two days after the American Idol Season Finale, Doolittle appeared alongside the other nine top ten contestants on Larry King Live. In an exclusive interview with Good Morning America, Simon Cowell stated that the season six title of American Idol should have rightfully gone to Doolittle.

Doolittle was part of the 2007 American Idols tour, along with her fellow top 10 contestants. Her performances included "Proud Mary", which she sang as a duet with Sanjaya Malakar (joked by many critics to compare 'the best and the worst' of Season 6), a Supremes tribute with LaKisha Jones, and a solo rendition of "(You Make Me Feel Like) A Natural Woman".

Writer Stephen Holden of The New York Times described Doolittle as a "phenomenally gifted, stylistically adroit [...] Gladys Knight-Tina Turner hybrid [who] brings a compelling honesty to every phrase she sings," and predicted a successful post-Idol career for her.

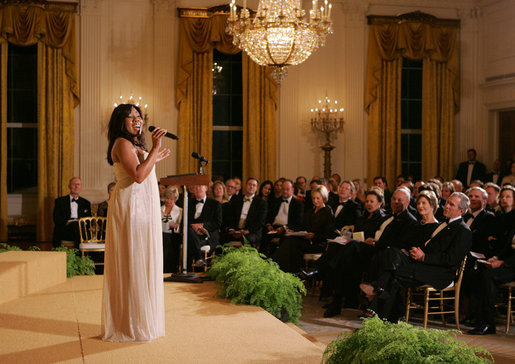
Doolittle performing for President George W. Bush, Laura Bush and guests in the East Room of the White House, during a social dinner in honor of America's Promise—The Alliance for Youth, November 2007

Doolittle sang "The Star-Spangled Banner" at Game 5 of the 2007 NBA Eastern Conference Finals between the Cleveland Cavaliers and Detroit Pistons.

She was part of the Michael W. Smith and friends Caribbean Cruise in July 2008 as a guest performer, and joined him on his Christmas tour the same year. She is featured with Smith on the song "Amazing Love" on the soundtrack to Billy: The Early Years.

She has participated in several episodes of a blogtalkradio web show called Moments With Melinda where fans can call and talk to her. Doolittle also contributed to the book Chicken Soup for the American Idol Soul.

Her first single, "My Funny Valentine", was released by Sony BMG in February 2008 through iTunes and Amazon MP3 Downloads. Doolittle stated that she planned to work on a CD of "soul music"; it was announced in July 2008 that she had signed with the independent label Hi Fi Recordings, which released her debut CD, Coming Back to You, on February 3, 2009. In its first month, the CD sold over 30,000 copies. Since its release, the album has sold over 53,000 copies.

=== Author ===
Beyond Me: Finding Your Way to Life's Next Level is a book written by Doolittle about her life before during and after her American Idol experience. It was released April 20, 2010.

=== 2013 ===
"Never Giving Up" is a single co-written and performed by Doolittle about her struggles post "Idol" and overcoming them. It was included on an EP, You're the Reason, which was released on November 12, 2013. USA Today said of the release "The new material doesn't rely on the same old-school soul of 2009's Coming Back to You, but there's a snap and crackle not only in the funky grooves of You're the Reason, but in the live-wire energy of Doolittle's delivery."

Since 2011, Doolittle has been co-hosting TVLine.com's weekly American Idol recap web series, Reality Check, with Michael Slezak.

=== 2016 ===
Doolittle has also collaborated with the band Postmodern Jukebox to perform an old-school style cover of Britney Spears's song "Toxic", on their album Squad Goals.

== Philanthropy ==
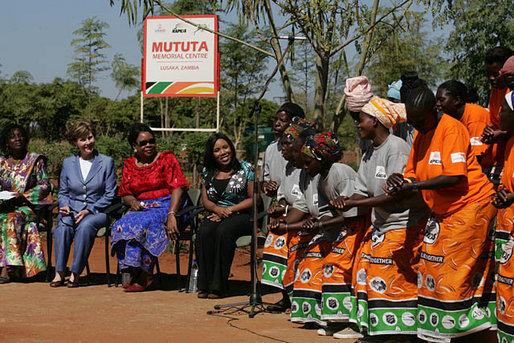
Melinda Doolittle and Laura Bush are greeted by a chorus of singers at the Mututa Memorial Center on June 28, 2007.

In June 2007, Doolittle visited Zambia with Laura Bush and the Malaria No More organization to distribute life-saving bed nets and raise awareness. As part of the trip, she performed with a praise band at the Miracle Life Family Church in Lusaka.

On November 3, 2007, Nicole Lapin interviewed Doolittle for CNN's Young People Who Rock series. In the interview she refers to her support for the Malaria No More campaign and how donating bed nets can help to eradicate malaria from the African continent. She specifically mentions her supportive fans who have donated bed nets on her behalf at each of the 59 venues of the American Idol tour and who also made a large donation on her birthday.

== Discography ==
=== Studio albums ===
Year	Album details	Peak chart positions			Sales
Year	Album details	US	US R&B	US Indie	Sales
2009	Coming Back to You: Released: February 3, 2009; Label: HiFi Recordings	58	39	3	53,000

=== Extended plays ===
Year	Album details	Sales
2007	Melinda Doolittle: Released: June 12, 2007; Label: 19 Entertainment	38,000
2013	You're the Reason: Released: November 12, 2013; Label: Sonador Entertainment	

=== Singles ===
Year	Single	Peak positions	Album
Year	Single	US AC	Album
2008	"My Funny Valentine"	—	Non-album song
2009	"It's Your Love"	29	Coming Back to You
2013	"Never Giving Up"	—	You're The Reason
"—" denotes releases that did not chart

== links ==
- Official site
- Melinda Doolittle at IMDb
- Melinda Doolittle at AllMusic
