= Fun (Blondie song) =

Single by Blondie

from the album Pollinator
- B-side: "My Monster"
- Released: February 1, 2017
- Recorded: 2016
- Genre: New wave, alternative rock
- Length: 4:19
- Label: BMG, Infectious Music
- Songwriter(s): David Sitek; Daniel Ledinsky; Erik Hassle; Adiam Feireiss
- Producer(s): John Congleton

Blondie singles chronology
"I Want to Drag You Around" (2014)	"Fun" (2017)	"Long Time" (2017)

"Fun" is the lead single from Blondie's eleventh studio album Pollinator. It was released on February 1, 2017, on all major online platforms. On February 13, 2017, the single was released as a 7-inch single in the UK. The single included the Johnny Marr penned track "My Monster" as a B-side. Several remixes were made for the track, and released on digital singles on March 8.

== Reception ==
The single made the UK radio Airplay charts in early February 2017, reaching number 22 on February 24, 2017. The single was also chosen as Record of the Week on BBC Radio 2 and added to their A-List of songs which are the most played on the station. In the Official Charts, Fun debuted at number 3 in the UK Physical Chart Top 100 and at number 2 in the Vinyl Singles Top 40. The single spent eight weeks in the top 10 in both charts.

On the Billboard Dance Club Songs chart for the issue dated May 13, 2017, the single reached number 1. It is Blondie's most successful single worldwide since 1999's "Maria".

== Music video ==
The official music video directed by Dikayl Rimmasch was released on February 15, 2017.

It begins with an astronaut played by actor Daeg Faerch who is hurtling through space along with black and white clips of the band playing the track. The astronaut lands on Mars and meets an intergalactic character (played by Raja). Then the androgynous male, actor Daeg Faerch, astronaut goes to Earth and the video concludes with a Studio 54-like nightclub party followed by the astronaut flying off into space again.

Rimmasch described the main character as "a beautiful androgynous kid kind of drugged-out, cruising to Mars and finding a party there." Speaking of the narrative he said "the whole trip was in this character's mind. We didn’t want to take the sci-fi elements too seriously, so we did these light-hearted animations and shot in this minimal Apollo capsule set."

== Track listings ==
7-inch single
No.	Title	Writer(s)	Length
1.	"Fun"	David Sitek, Daniel Ledinsky, Erik Hassle, Adiam Feireiss	4:19
2.	"My Monster"	Johnny Marr	3:29

Digital maxi-single
No.	Title	Length
1.	"Fun" (Eric Kupper Disco Edit)	4:12
2.	"Fun" (Eric Kupper Disco Remix)	7:33
3.	"Fun" (Greg Cohen Spirit of 79 Short Edit)	4:36
4.	"Fun" (Greg Cohen Spirit of 70 Long Edit)	5:07
5.	"Fun" (Kyodee Radio Edit)	3:22
6.	"Fun" (Kyodee Remix)	5:20

Digital maxi-single
No.	Title	Length
1.	"Fun" (Crooked Man Remix)	6:09
2.	"Fun" (Greg Cohen Spirit of 79 Remix)	4:35
3.	"Fun" (Eric Kupper Disco Remix)	4:12
4.	"Fun" (Kyodee Remix)	3:22
5.	"Fun" (StoneBridge Remix)	3:18
6.	"Fun" (DrewG. Remix)	4:19
7.	"Fun" (Kris Vanderheyden Remix)	3:57

== Charts ==
Chart (2017)	Peak position
US Dance Club Songs (Billboard)	1
UK Official Vinyl Singles Chart Top 40	2
UK Official Physical Singles Chart Top 100	3
Mexico Airplay	42
