= Pollinator (album) =

2017 studio album by Blondie

Studio album by Blondie
- Released: May 5, 2017
- Recorded: 2015–17
- Studios: Magic Shop, New York City
- Genres: New wave; electronic rock; alternative rock
- Length: 45:34
- Labels: BMG; Infectious
- Producer: John Congleton

Blondie chronology
Blondie 4(0) Ever (2014)	Pollinator (2017)	Vivir en La Habana (2021)

Singles from Pollinator
- 1. "Fun" Released: February 1, 2017; 2. "Long Time" Released: March 24, 2017; 3. "Too Much" Released: June 12, 2017; 4. "Doom or Destiny" Released: September 19, 2017

Pollinator is the eleventh studio album by the American rock band Blondie, released on May 5, 2017, by BMG Rights Management.

In contrast to previous Blondie albums, the band recorded many songs that were written for them by other artists, a collaborative process which inspired the album's title. More than half of the tracks on the album were written by other artists, including Sia, Johnny Marr, and Charli XCX, while the remainder were written or co-written by members of Blondie themselves.

Released to generally favourable reviews, the album peaked at no. 63 on the US Billboard 200 chart, with the first single "Fun" reaching no. 1 on the Billboard Dance Chart. The album was a greater success in the UK, peaking at no. 4 and giving Blondie their ninth British Top 10 album and the band's highest UK chart peak in 18 years.

This Was the final album during Clem Burke's Lifetime before his death in 2025.

== Background ==
The album returns to a more band-oriented sound following the group's experimentation with electronic music for their previous release Ghosts of Download. Many of the songs on the album were collaborations written by outside writers, including songs written by TV on the Radio's David Sitek, Johnny Marr, Sia, Nick Valensi from The Strokes, Charli XCX, Canadian YouTube personality Adam Johnston, a.k.a. YourMovieSucks (who records music under the name An Unkindness), and Dev Hynes. Five of the album's tracks were written or co-written by Blondie bandmembers, with two songs written by Debbie Harry and Chris Stein (Harry also co-wrote one track with Hynes) and another two were written by Blondie keyboardist Matt Katz-Bohen with his wife Laurel. Lead guitarist Chris Stein stated in an interview with Mojo, "We thought to ask people because there's so much good music swirling about", rather than it being a result of running thin on ideas. "We sorted the contributors ourselves, or someone would send us a bunch of songs and we'd pick one" he continued, explaining that Blondie and producer John Congleton had curated the submissions.

The album was officially announced on January 23, 2017, when the band uploaded to their social media a scan of an interview with Mojo magazine which confirmed the album's release date. On January 30, the album's cover and track listing were unveiled.

The album cover was designed by the visual artist Shepard Fairey.

== Promotion ==
The band's performance at WTTW's Grainger Studio in Chicago, taped on December 10, 2015, aired on the PBS concert series Soundstage on January 26, 2017, containing the new songs "My Monster" and "Gravity". "Fun" was released on February 1, 2017, as the album's lead single. A second track, "My Monster", was released as an iTunes instant grat, and made available to those who had pre-ordered the album, on February 19, 2017. "Fun" became Blondie's most successful single in years, rising to Number 1 on Billboard's Dance Club Songs (Blondie's first appearance on that chart since 2003's "Good Boys" and first number 1 since 1995's "Atomic" remixes) and many charts in other countries.

The second single, "Long Time", had its first play on Ken Bruce's show on BBC Radio 2 on March 21, and was released as a single on March 24. It was released on a limited edition 7" vinyl, as was "Fun", backed with non-album track "The Breaks". "Long Time" gave the band another Top 5 hit on the US Billboard Dance chart, their second from this album.

Later in April two more songs were released: "Fragments" and "Tonight". "Fragments", released for streaming only, is a song originally written and performed by Canadian YouTuber and musician Adam Johnston, who releases music under the name An Unkindness, that gained much attention during the Australian tour and was released as a promo track on YouTube. "Tonight" is a Charli XCX penned track, sung in duet with Laurie Anderson. It was released on a limited edition 1000 copies one-sided 7" pressing, sold at Blondie's pop up shop at the Camden Market as a promotional single. This song has also appeared on the CD edition of the album as a hidden-track after "Fragments".

On September 19, "Doom or Destiny" (featuring Joan Jett) was released as the album's fourth single, backed with a politically charged video directed by Rob Roth.

== Tours ==
In summer 2017, Blondie undertook a co-headlining tour of the US with the band Garbage, in which Debbie Harry appeared onstage in full honey bee regalia. In keeping with the Pollinator album, the costume was designed as a statement about the dwindling bee population and environmental health. Harry also wore a full-length cape which declared: "STOP FUCKING THE PLANET" in large block letters.

Blondie toured for the album during 2017 and 2018, visiting several cities in the United States, Canada, United Kingdom, New Zealand, Australia, Germany, France, Ireland, Mexico, Brazil, Argentina and Cuba. A date in Chile was scheduled but later cancelled and rescheduled for 2019 and going sold-out in ten minutes. Finally, the Chile concert was cancelled. During July–August, 2017 Blondie co-headlined the "Rage and Rapture Tour" with Garbage, playing 27 shows in the US, Canada and Mexico.

In 2019, Blondie were invited to perform in Havana, Cuba, as part of a cultural exchange through the Cuban Ministry of Culture. Director Rob Roth created the documentary Vivir en La Habana with recordings and interviews from this travel, which premiered in several festivals and produced the homonymous live EP.

== Critical reception ==
Professional ratings
Aggregate scores
Source	Rating
AnyDecentMusic?	6.1
Metacritic	71/100
Review scores
Source	Rating
AllMusic	3/5 stars
Consequence	B−
Entertainment Weekly	B+
The Guardian	4/5 stars
The Line of Best Fit	7.5/10
Mojo	3/5 stars
Pitchfork	6.7/10
Q	4/5 stars
Rolling Stone	3.5/5 stars
Vice	A−

At Metacritic, the album has a score of 71 out of 100, based on 22 reviews, indicating "generally favorable" reviews. Critics generally commented on the large number of collaborators and composers, lamenting the small number of Harry-Stein-penned tracks, and praised Congleton's production and Harry's interpretation.

Jon Dolan from Rolling Stone said that "Each [collaborator] puts their own reverent spin on the band's vintage neon Nu Yawk garage rock, as 71-year-old Debbie Harry has a catty good time all over the place." In an A− review, Robert Christgau pointed at the tension between Harry's age (which people would normally consider old) and her youthful and energetic attitude: "Any youngish person who doesn't buy her «Take me back home again/I wanna make love again,» not to mention 53-year-old Johnny Marr's «Human beings are stupid things when we're young,» has much to learn about the aging process in this ever-changing world we hope we all age in". Stephen Thomas Erlewine from AllMusic highlighted the balance between the effort to dialogue with modern sounds and the intention to be faithful to the identity of the band.

Dave Simpson from The Guardian celebrated Burke's drumming and Harry's warm delivery. Maura Johnston from Pitchfork highlighted "Fragments," the closing track, stating that: "It's part 'Is That All There Is,' part defiant wave goodbye—and it's a fitting close to an album that shows one of the most crucial American rock bands searching for footing in a chaotic, collapsible pop landscape."

== Commercial performance ==
Pollinator has charted higher in most regions than their previous three albums. The album debuted and peaked at number 4 in the United Kingdom, the band's ninth Top 10 album and seventh Top 5 there (and their first since 1999's No Exit). As of July 2017, the album has sold 24,206 copies in the UK. The album also debuted at number 1 in the UK Independent Albums Chart, and remained in the top 50 for 16 consecutive weeks. In the United States, the album debuted and peaked at number 63 on the Billboard 200, also the band's highest-charting album in their native country since 1999. The album was more prominent on Billboard's Top Independent Albums Chart where it debuted and peaked at number 4. In Australia, the album peaked at number 29.

== Track listing ==
No.	Title	Writer(s)	Length
1.	"Doom or Destiny" (featuring Joan Jett)	Chris Stein; Deborah Harry	2:54
2.	"Long Time"	Harry; Dev Hynes	4:35
3.	"Already Naked"	Matthew Katz-Bohen; Laurel Katz-Bohen; Lucian Piane	4:06
4.	"Fun"	David Sitek; Daniel Ledinsky; Erik Hassle; Adiam Feireiss	4:19
5.	"My Monster"	Johnny Marr	3:29
6.	"Best Day Ever"	Sia Furler; Nick Valensi	3:58
7.	"Gravity"	Charlotte Aitchison; Dimitri Tikovoï	3:47
8.	"When I Gave Up on You"	Michael Gregory; Andrew Gregory	4:02
9.	"Love Level" (featuring John Roberts)	Stein; Harry	4:19
10.	"Too Much"	M. Katz-Bohen; L. Katz-Bohen	3:08
11.	"Fragments"	Adam Johnston	6:57

CD hidden bonus track
No.	Title	Writer(s)	Length
12.	"Tonight" (featuring Laurie Anderson)	Aitchison; Andrew Armstrong	5:39

Japanese bonus tracks
No.	Title	Writer(s)	Length
12.	"The Breaks"	Stein; Harry	4:15
13.	"Fun" (Greg Cohen Spirit of 79 remix)	Sitek; Ledinsky; Hassle; Feireiss	4:35
14.	"Fun" (Eric Kupper disco remix)	Sitek; Ledinsky; Hassle; Feireiss	4:12
15.	"Fun" (Drew G remix)	Sitek; Ledinsky; Hassle; Feireiss	4:19

== Short film and EP Vivir en La Habana ==
Vivir en La Habana

EP by Blondie
- Released: July 16, 2021
- Recorded: 2019
- Venues: Teatro Mella, Havana, Cuba
- Genres: New wave; electronic rock; alternative rock
- Length: 39:32
- Label: BMG
- Producers: Deborah Harry, Chris Stein, Clem Burke, Rob Roth

Blondie chronology
Pollinator (2017)	Vivir en La Habana (2021)	Against the Odds: 1974–1982 (2022)

In 2019, Blondie were invited to perform in Havana, Cuba, as part of a cultural exchange through the Cuban Ministry of Culture. This experience was documented by director Rob Roth in the short film Blondie: Vivir en La Habana, which featured 16mm, 8mm film and digital footage from the shows, band members sightseeing Havana and interviews. Guitarist Chris Stein couldn't travel but is present in footage shot in New York. The film is divided into three segments: "Water", "Fire" and "Air", which present a meditation on the experience as well as highlights from the two-night live musical performances with special guests Alain Perez, David Torrens and Afro-Cuban rock band Sintesis at Havana's Teatro Mella.

The short film made the selection of several film festivals in 2021, such as In-Edit Festival (Spain), Rizoma Festival (Spain), Tribeca Film Festival 2021 (United States), Sheffield DocFest 2021 (England), Reykjavik International Film Festival 2021 (Iceland), Sonoma International Film Festival 2022 (United States), BBC's LongShots 2022 (United Kingdom).

An EP, entitled Vivir en La Habana, was released in July 2021 in vinyl and streaming. It consists of recordings of six live tracks from the Cuba shows with extra guitars added by Stein in a New York studio.

=== Track listing ===
Vivir en La Habana
No.	Title	Writer(s)	Length
1.	"The Tide Is High"	John Holt; Howard Barnett; Tyrone Evans	8:39
2.	"Long Time"	Deborah Harry; Dev Hynes	5:11
3.	"Wipe Off My Sweat"	Harry; Chris Stein; Matt Katz-Bohen	4:01
4.	"Heart of Glass"	Harry; Stein	7:32
5.	"Rapture"	Harry; Stein	9:53
6.	"Dreaming"	Harry; Stein	4:13
Total length:			39:32

Notes

- "The Tide Is High" contains excerpts of "Groove Is in the Heart" (1990) by Deee-Lite.
- "Heart of Glass" contains excerpts of "I Feel Love" (1977) by Donna Summer and "The Train from Kansas City" (1965) by the Shangri-Las.
- "Rapture" contains excerpts from "(You Gotta) Fight for Your Right (To Party!)" (1986) by Beastie Boys.

== Personnel ==
Blondie

- Debbie Harry – vocals
- Chris Stein – guitar
- Clem Burke – drums
- Leigh Foxx – bass guitar
- Matt Katz-Bohen – keyboards
- Tommy Kessler – guitar

Additional personnel

- Greg Calbi – mastering engineer
- John Congleton – production
- Rich Costey – mix engineer
- Gregory Brothers – backing vocals on "When I Gave Up on You"
- Kabir Hermon – studio engineer
- Tony Hoffer – additional production on tracks 1/2/4/10
- Joan Jett – backing vocals on "Doom or Destiny"
- Johnny Marr – guitar
- John Roberts – backing vocals on "Love Level"
- Nick Valensi – guitar
- What Cheer? Brigade – horns and drums on "Love Level"

Vivir en La Habana personnel

- Tom Camuso and Steve Rosenthal – mixing engineers
- Tom Heinisch – recording engineer
- Michael Graves – mastering engineer
- Blondie and Steve Rosenthal – producers
- Chris Stein, Debbie Harry, Clem Burke and Tommy Manzi – executive producers
- Carlos Alfonso, Ele Valdés, María del Carme Ávila, Alejandro Delgado, Juan Carlos Marín, Jamil Schery, Degnis Bofill, Adel González – side musicians on "The Tide is High" and "Rapture"

== Charts ==
Chart (2017)	Peak position
Australian Albums (ARIA)	29
Austrian Albums (Ö3 Austria)	27
Belgian Albums (Ultratop Flanders)	55
Belgian Albums (Ultratop Wallonia)	30
Czech Albums (ČNS IFPI)	26
Dutch Albums (Album Top 100)	78
French Albums (SNEP)	86
German Albums (Offizielle Top 100)	21
Irish Albums (IRMA)	57
Italian Albums (FIMI)	62
New Zealand Heatseekers Albums (RMNZ)	3
Scottish Albums (Official Charts)	4
Slovakia Albums (ČNS IFPI)	14
Spanish Albums (PROMUSICAE)	86
Swiss Albums (Schweizer Hitparade)	22
UK Albums (Official Charts)	4
UK Independent Albums (Official Charts)	1
US Billboard 200	63
US Independent Albums (Billboard)	4
US Top Alternative Albums (Billboard)	7
US Top Rock Albums (Billboard)	15
