= Good Friend and a Glass of Wine =

Single by LeAnn Rimes

from the album Family
- Released: January 24, 2008
- Genre: Country
- Length: 3:34
- Label: Curb
- Songwriters: LeAnn Rimes; Darrell Brown; Blair Daly
- Producer: Dann Huff

LeAnn Rimes singles chronology
"Nothin' Better to Do" (2007)	"Good Friend and a Glass of Wine" (2008)	"What I Cannot Change" (2008)

Music video
- "Good Friend and a Glass of Wine" on YouTube

"Good Friend and a Glass of Wine" is a song by LeAnn Rimes, recorded for her ninth studio album Family (2007). It was written by Rimes, Darrell Brown, and Blair Daly and produced by Dann Huff. It was released by Curb Records on January 24, 2008 as the second single from the album.

It peaked at number 35 on the US Hot Country Songs chart.

== Composition ==
"Good Friend and a Glass of Wine" (2008)
A 30 second sample of LeAnn Rimes' "Good Friend and a Glass of Wine", featuring the chorus.

"Good Friend and a Glass of Wine" is a country pop song of three minutes and 44 seconds. The song is co-written by Rimes along with Darrell Brown and Blair Daly. The song was written in the key of A Major with Rimes' vocal spanning two octaves, from G_{3} to E_{5}. The song talks about how the subject just needs a break to "talk trash", and have a good time with friends and a glass of wine.

== Music video ==
The music video was released on February 27, 2008. The video was directed by Phil Griffin. The video shows Rimes walking through a town and on the radio singing, with friends and out having a good time.

== Track listing ==
US [Radio Mixes EP] November 18, 2008

- 1 What I Cannot Change Kaskade Radio Mix] 3:41
- 2 What I Cannot Change [Jody Den Broeder Radio Mix] 4:43
- 3 What I Cannot Change [Scotty K Radio Mix] 4:19
- 4 What I Cannot Change [Bronleewe & Bose Radio Mix] 4:01
- 5 Good Friend And A Glass Of Wine [Wideboys Electro Radio Mix] 3:33
- 6 Good Friend And A Glass Of Wine [Soul Seekerz Radio Mix] 3:32
- 7 Headphones [Almighty Radio Mix] 3:37

US [Extended Mixes EP] November 18, 2008

- 1 What I Cannot Change Kaskade Extended Mix] 5:08
- 2 What I Cannot Change [Jody den Broeder Extended Mix] 8:03
- 3 What I Cannot Change [Scotty K Klub Mix] 8:12
- 4 What I Cannot Change [Bronleewe & Bose Extended Mix] 6:25
- 5 Good Friend And A Glass Of Wine [Wideboys Electro Mix] 5:49
- 6 Good Friend And A Glass Of Wine [Soul Seekerz Extended Mix] 8:54
- 7 Headphones [Almighty Extended Mix] 8:01

== Charts ==
Chart (2008)	Peak position
US Hot Country Songs (Billboard)	35
