= Darrell Brown (musician) =

American songwriter

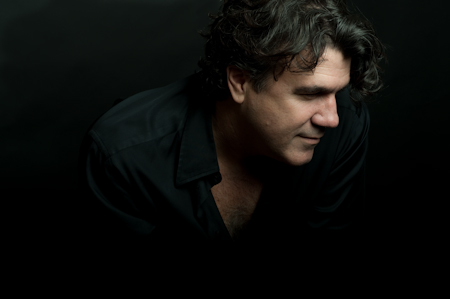
- Brown in 2023.

Background information
- Born: 1976 (age 49–50); Seattle, Washington, U.S.
- Genres: Pop Music, Country music
- Occupations: Songwriter, Producer, Arranger
- Instrument: piano

Darrell Brown (born 1976) is an American songwriter, arranger, manager and record producer who has collaborated with recording artists and contributed music to the film and television industries. Brown maintains residences in both Los Angeles, United States (US), and Nashville, US.

Brown has been credited with worldwide music sales of over 80 million units, as both a songwriter and producer.

== Career ==
=== Songwriting ===
Brown co-wrote the number 1 hit "You'll Think of Me” by Keith Urban, which won the Grammy Award for Best Male Country Vocal Performance in 2006. Brown also co-wrote Urban's smash hit "Raining on Sunday".

Brown's co-written the hit single for Josh Turner, "Why Don't We Just Dance", was Number #1 on the Billboard Country Charts for four weeks in a row. The longest running number 1 single of Josh Turner's career and Turner's first Number 1 single on the Canadian Country Charts. "Why Don't We Just Dance" was the Most Played Country Single of The Year in 2010 according to Mediabase.

John Mayer and Keith Urban performed one of Darrell's songs "If Ever I Could Love” on (CMT) Crossroads Television Special for CMT and Brown's songs "Good Friend and a Glass of Wine” and "Nothin' Better to Do” were performed by Joss Stone and LeAnn Rimes on Crossroad's CMT Special.

=== Production and arrangement ===
Brown co-arranged and worked on Neil Young release "Earth". As well as on Neil Young and Crazy Horse 2012 release, Americana, and arranged and conducted a one hundred-voice choir on Neil Young's Living with War; Brown also worked on Young's Chrome Dreams 2 album.

Brown co-produced vocals on David Gray and LeAnn Rimes duet "Snow In Vegas", that was featured on David Gray's "Mutineers" Deluxe version of his Album.

Brown co-produced and arranged the Blush single, "Undivided" (featuring Snoop Dogg), a release that reached the "#2" position on the "Billboard Dance" music chart. Their follow up single "Dance On" reached the # 1 position on "Billboard Dance" music chart.

Brown produced and arranged the critically acclaimed cult record Radney Foster's, "See What You Want To See" on Arista Austin Records. The Dixie Chicks, Keith Urban, Dierks Bentley, Darius Rucker and a host of other artists and songwriters hail this recording as one of Foster's best and has influenced the cutting edge of Nashville over the last decade and a half. Songs Raining On Sunday, Godspeed, I'm In among others originally appeared on this recording.

Brown is co-executive producer for the series of 2012 remixes that adapted Tammy Wynette's "Stand By Your Man" single. The first remix was released on June 5, 2012, opening a year-long celebration of the Tammy Wynette "Legacy".

Brown also produced and co-wrote the #1 pop single for Jim Brickman and Rebecca Lyn Howard, "Simple Things."

Brown spearheaded the Epic Records passion project "Soul Mission," co-writing and producing for the super group, which included Steve Cropper, Mavis Staples and Booker T. Jones.

Brown's other productions include Radney Foster "This World We Live in" and " Revival", Ty Herndon "Right About Now", First Call "Sacred Journey", Michelle Shocked "Good News", Deborah Lippmann " Vinyl" and "Christmas EP" among others.

== LeAnn Rimes ==
In 2022, Brown co-wrote and co-produced LeAnn Rimes' album God's Work, released through Everle Records, Thirty Tigers, and Sony Orchard. Chris Willman of Variety wrote "god's work"... Adventurous, accomplished and stirring, it sits with the best of Rimes' work..." American Songwriter magazine wrote "Rimes' powerhouse vocals shine throughout as tracks dance between stripped-back new age arrangements and thunderous gospel-tinged theatrics. For those willing to take that journey - gods work will not disappoint". Folk Magazine posted on Twitter "Spaceship is my 2022 song of the year..no question"

Brown is the co-producer, arranger and co-writer for 2017 (USA) and 2016 (Uk) release of LeAnn Rimes album, Remnants' Remnants continues to garner critical acclaim alongside her prior "Spitfire" Project. With highlights being the title track "Remnants", for the emotional rawness of "Mother", for the soulfulness of "Do It Wrong With Me" and "Love is Love is Love" and for her first USA Hot AC single release off of Remnants is Long Live Love. Her dance remix of "Long Live Love" reached #1 on the Billboard Dance Club Charts with remixers Dave Aude, Ivan Gomez, DrewG and Dj Deville bringing their talents from the turntables to the dance floor. Mark Batson came aboard as co-producer and co-writer for most of the album, with Steve Jordan co -producing one track as well.

Brown was also the producer, arranger and main co-writer for the 2013 LeAnn Rimes album Spitfire, the recording artist's last contractual record with Curb Records. Spitfire has been critically acclaimed. Many major publications cited it as the best album of her career at this point in time. With Alison Krauss, Jeff Beck, Rob Thomas among others joining her on tracks "What Have I Done", "Gasoline and Matches" and "Borrowed".

Previously, Brown has co-written with LeAnn Rimes nine songs for her critically acclaimed release Family - which includes her multi-format hit single "Nothin' Better to Do", a career charting single, the first in history making its way onto the Country Singles chart, the A/C chart and the Club play Dance Chart at the same time. "What I Cannot Change" hit number # 1 on The Billboard Dance Charts".

Brown also co-produced (with Vince Gill) the LeAnn Rimes album, Lady & Gentlemen, and the singles, "Crazy Women" and "Give".

Brown also co-produced Rimes on the track "Smokin' In The Boys Room" for the 'Nashville Outlaws: A Tribute to Mötley Crüe a 2014 studio album released via Big Machine Records. It is a tribute album to the heavy metal band Mötley Crüe, featuring covers of their songs performed by various country music artists.

Brown executive produced Rimes Greatest Hits Dance Remix Collection titled Dance Like You Don't Give A .... on Curb Records. The Collection of mostly newly remixed greatest hits went Number 1 on the iTunes Dance Charts on its first days of release.

=== Film and television ===
Brown was contributed songs and music to films such as Steven Soderbergh's film Logan Lucky, for Coen Brothers "Gambit", "My Big Fat Greek Wedding 2, "Cruel Intentions", CSI Vegas among others.

Brown co-wrote and co-produced with Nathan Chapman and Rita Wilson the end title song "Even More Mine" for the movie, Big Fat Greek Wedding 2.

Brown co-wrote with Rimes and co-produced with Dave Aude three new Holiday songs for 2018 Hallmark Channel's Christmas Movie It's Christmas, Eve. All songs are included on the soundtrack for the movie available on EverLE Records / Thirty Tigers.

Brown co-wrote and produced songs for the Michael Hoffman-directed film, Gambit. starring Cameron Diaz, Colin Firth, and Alan Rickman, with a script by the Coen brothers.

Brown has also written and produced music that has appeared in both film and television; the former includes productions such as Gambit, Like Dandelion Dust, and Cruel Intentions, while television series Cold Case, Rookie Blue, One Tree Hill, Angela's Eyes, Las Vegas, and Man of the People have utilized Brown's musical work. Since 2014 Brown plays himself in LeAnn Rimes and Eddie Cibrian's TV Reality show "LeAnn & Eddie" on VH1.

== Video games ==
Brown is responsible for the creation and production of specific rock, pop and country music that has been written and designed for the internationally renowned hit EA video game franchise The Sims, The Sims 3 and for underscore music for other video games for EA and EA sports that include Nintendo Wii Boogie and Playground. Brown completed production on EA Sims 3 Video game expansion pack producing Simlish vocals on Martina McBride, Luke Bryan, Lady Antebellum, Thompson Square and The Lunabelles.

== Special projects ==
Brown and Rimes co-authored a tome based on the song "What I Cannot Change" for Harper Studio Book Publishers, based on the letters received from people around the world who were moved and inspired by the song.

== NARAS (Grammy) ==
Brown currently serves on the board of governors for NARAS. Brown served as musical director and co-creative producer for the Grammy Preservation and Legacy concerts that occurred every year during Grammy week leading up to the Grammy Awards. Brown has worked as MD and co creative producer for many Grammy Events around the country working with Solomon Burke, Ed Sheeran, Natasha Bedingfield, Dionne Warrick, Jason Mraz, Emmy Lou Harris and Rodney Crowell, Ledisi, Yolanda Adams, Christette Michele, The Fray, Lianne Van Havas, Musiq Soulchild, Jeff Beck, Melanie Fiona, Jerry Lee Lewis, John Fogerty, BeBe Winans, Joe Nichols, Colby Callait, Sarah Barrellis, The Fray, Trombone Shorty, Mavis Staples, Dave Koz, Shelby Lynn, Robert Cray, Martina Mcbride, Garth Brooks, Kid Rock, Gretchen Wilson, Loretta Lynn, Jonny Lang, Bret Michaels, Lee Ann Womack, Jimmy Webb, JD Souther, Dan Wilson, Joy Williams, Johnny Rzeznik, Jeff Barry, Allen Shamblin, Mike Reid, Bonnie Raitt, Kris Kristofferson, Steve Cropper, Valerie Simpson, Skylar Grey, Gavin Degraw, Aloe Blacc, Melissa Etheridge, Plain White T's, Walk The Moon, Deborah Cox and Willie Nelson among many others.

== Songwriting credits, partial discography ==
The Crystal Method
"Grace"

Keith Urban
"Georgia Woods"
"Right On Back To You"
"If Ever I Could Love"
"You'll Think Of Me" #1
"Raining On Sunday" #3
"Live To Love Another Day"
"Used To The Pain"

Ariana Grande
"The Beauty Within You"

Bon Jovi
"Work For The Working Man"
"Lonely"

Stevie Nicks
"Borrowed"

Faith Hill
"Wish For You"
"Never Been So In Love"

Josh Turner
"Why Don't We Just Dance" #1

LeAnn Rimes

"Nothin' Better To Do" #10
"What Have I Done"
"Who We Really Are"
"Spitfire"
"What I Cannot Change" #1
"You've Ruined Me"
"Borrowed"
"A Waste Is A Terrible Thing To Mind"
"I Do Now"
"Just A Girl Like You"
"God Takes Care Of Your Kind"
"I Wish i Was Wrong"
"Some People"
"Good Friend and a Glass of Wine"
"Fight"
"Something I Can Feel"
"Pretty Things"
"For the First Time"
"One Day Too Long"
"Upper Hand"
"Today Is Christmas"
"I Still Believe In Santa Claus"
"Joy"
"Love Line" #5
"Outrageous Love"
"Mother"
"Remnants"
"Long Live Love" #1
"Learning Your Language"
"Love is Love is Love" #1
"Humbled"
"Give Me Something (I Can't Give Myself)"
"Do It Wrong With Me"
"Dang Dang"
"You and Me and Christmas"
"It's Christmas Eve"
"The Gift Of Your Love"
"How Much A Heart Can Hold"
"The Only"
"The Wild"
"Awakening" #1
"Spaceship" #3
"Imagined With Love”"
"Innocent"
"God’s Work"
"Something Better’s Coming"
"There Will Be A Better Day"
“Throw My Arms Around The World” “Wild Things Run”

Little Big Town
"Lonely Enough"

Rascal Flatts
"Better Now"

Richard Marx
"Front Row Seat"

Dolly Parton
"The River UnBroken" #34

Wilson Phillips
"Next To You (Someday I'll Be)"

Rita Wilson
"Crying Crying"
"Forgiving Me Forgiving You"
"There Will Be A Better Day"
"Even More Mine"

Brooks and Dunn
"Again"
"Drunk On Love"

Louise Goffin
"Get With The World"

Blackberry Smoke
"I'd Be Lying"

Trace Adkins
"Southern Hallelujah"

Sara Evans
"Brooklyn and Austin"
"A Little Revival"

Jack Ingram
"Heartache"

Jason Jones
"Hang Around"

Jim Brickman
Simple Things w/ Rebecca Lyn Howard #1
When It Snows

Ty Herndon
"Right About Now"
"In The Arms Of The One Who Loves Me"
"Mighty Mighty Love"
"Mercy Line"
"There Will Be A Better Day"
"If I Could Only Have Her Love Back"

Radney Foster
"Raining On Sunday"
"Drunk On Love"
"Again"
"A Little Revival"
"Everything I Should Have Said"
"You Were So Right"
"What It Is That You Do"
"Another Way To Go"
"Big Idea"
"New Zip Code"
"I Won't Lie To You"
"Until It's Gone"
"Shed A little Light On It"
"I Made Peace With God"
"Suitcase"
"IF You Want To Be Loved"

Jo Dee Messina
"Think About Us"

Jack Ingram
"Heartache"

Lila McCann
"Mighty Mighty Love"

Michael McDonald
"Searching For Understanding"

Kenny Loggins
"This Too Will Pass"

Berlin
"Scream"
"Down and Dirty"
"Too Far To Fall"
"Once Upon A Time"

Russ Taff
"Table In The Wilderness"#1
"The River Unbroken" #1
"It Was Love" #1
"Take My Hand"#5
"Go On"

Mavis Staples
"Some Sweet Day" with Soul Mission

Willie Dixon
"Long Legged Goddess" w/ Willi Jones

Sharon Cuneta
"You're The Only One"

John Farham
"Beyond The Call"#3
"It All Comes Back To You"

Deborah Lippmann
"Make Me Love You"
"This One's On Me"
"Beautifully Obvious"

Cliff Richard
"The Day That I Stop Loving You"
"How Did She Get Here"

Dionne Warwick
"Dangerous"

Alexander Acha
"On My Own" ¿Quien Soy Yo?

Robby Armstrong
"Smoking and Drinking"
"As Long As Your Happy"
"Cool Cool Country"
"The First"
"Rodeo"
"Birthday Happy"
"Married Man"
"One Life To Love"

Terri Nunn
"Once Upon a Time" (Moment of Truth album, 1991)
"Too Far to Fall" (Moment of Truth album, 1991)
