= Alina Artts =

Russian singer, actress, television presenter and writer (born 1986)

Alina Artts Алина Артц
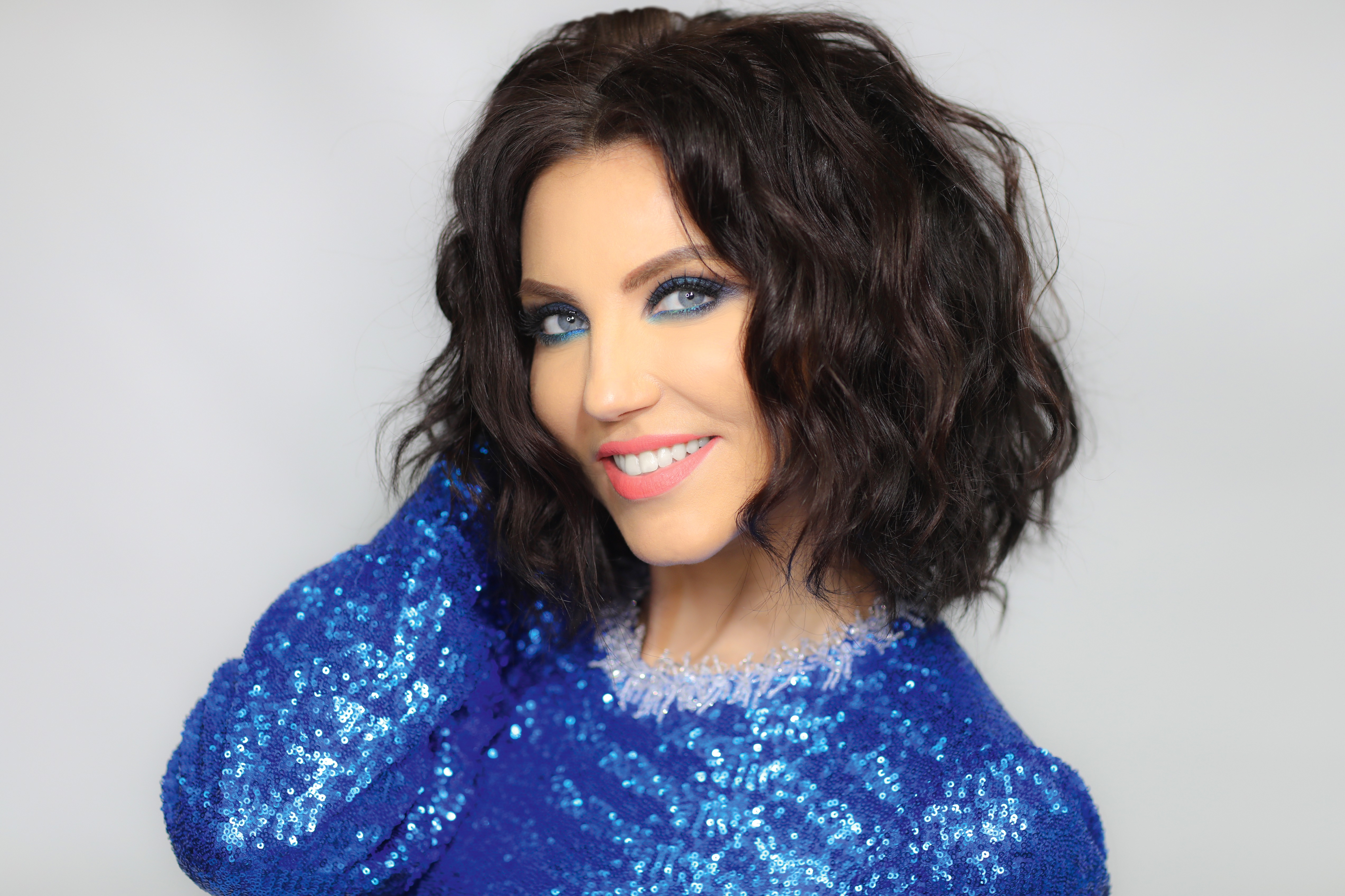

Background information
- Born: Alina Vladimirovna Artts; 5 February 1986 (age 40); Leningrad, Russian SFSR, USSR
- Genres: Pop; pop-dance
- Occupations: Singer; actress; writer; television presenter
- Years active: 2007-present
- Website: alinaartts.ru

Alina Vladimirovna Artts (Алина Владимировна Артц, born 5 February 1986, Leningrad, Russian SFSR, USSR) is a Russian pop singer, television presenter, actress and writer. She is the chief editor of the television channel Europa plus tv. She hosts the morning channel "Novoye utro" on NTV. She also hosts the reality show M-1 Fighter in the Boyets television network the evening show Hot Secrets s Alina Artts, and the television programme Star Secrets, and sang "Olimpiyskiy tanets" the official song of the 2014 Winter Olympics torch relay.

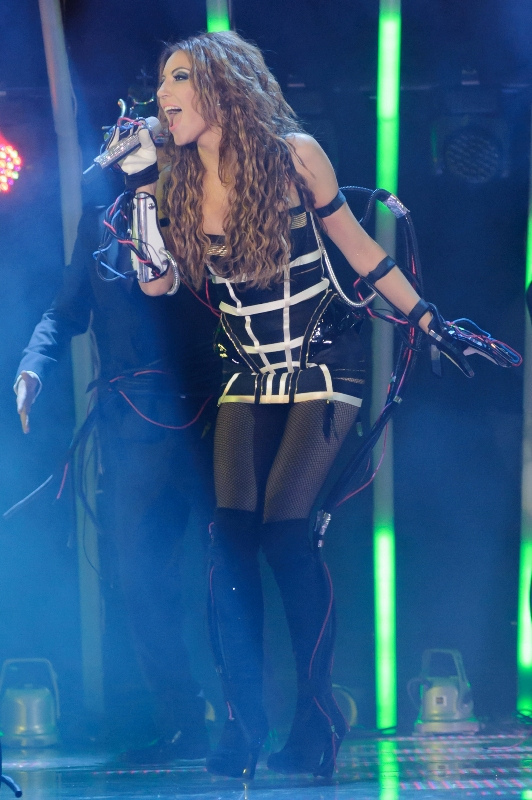
Alina Artts performing at a concert.

== Career ==
=== Russian television projects ===
- Artts hosts a reality show on mixed martial arts M-1 Fighter on the Boyets television channel;
- She is also the host of the weekly programme Hot Secrets s Alina Artts on the music channel, from 2011 to 2013;
- Artts hosted the programme Music Lunch live on Europa Plus TV in 2012;
- She also hosted the programme Star Secrets s Alina Artts also on Europa Plus TV in 2013 and 2014;
- Artts made a series of reports on Europa Plus Live in 2011, 2012 and 2013. Also for the TV network Europa Plus TV

=== International television projects ===
- She hosted live broadcasts to the European audience of the Festival of Russian Song "Zielona Góra" from 2008 to 2013.
- Artts lead a series of reports from the Billboard Music Awards Ceremony in 2012 and 2013
- She also hosted Star Secrets—in which she interviewed international artists (such as Christina Aguilera, Tiësto, Fatboy Slim, Steve Aoki, Loverush UK, and Marlon Roudette) on Europa Plus TV.

== Filmography ==
Year	Title	Network	Ref.
2007	Svakha	STS	
2008	Yeralash		
2008	Sled	Channel One Russia	
2008	Svad'ba tvoyey mechty	STS	
2009	220 Volt lyubvi		
2009	Krysha		
2012	ChISo 4102		

== Music career ==
- Artts was the vocalist of the DJ project Vengerov & Fedoroff from 2007 to 2008
- She is the soloist of the group VIA Sirius from 2009 to 2010
- Artts later started her solo vocal projects from 2011;
- She is the performer of the official song of the Olympic torch relay "Olimpiyskiy tanets".

== Olympic torch relay ==
The first performance of Artts' song "Olimpiyskiy tanets" was held on 8 October 2013 in Red Square. Since October 2013 her relay song crossed all countries, from the west to the east and back to Sochi, and performed "Olimpiyskiy tanets" at all official celebrations of the Torch Relay of the Olympic Flame, under which, thanks to the participation of hundreds of volunteers, it organized specially delivered flash mobs. October 28, 2013 Artts became an honorary torchbearer Torch Relay in the city of Pushkin.

== Discography ==
=== Albums ===
Year	Title	Duration
2012	Tantsuy, chtoby zhit'!	44:13

=== Singles ===
Year	Track name	Album
2009	"Tantsuy, chtoby zhit'!"	Tantsuy, chtoby zhit'!
2009	"Dyshi glubzhe"	Tantsuy, chtoby zhit'!
2009	"Its Alright"	Tantsuy, chtoby zhit'!
2010	"Oskolki"	Tantsuy, chtoby zhit'!
2011	"Prekrasnaya lozh'"	Tantsuy, chtoby zhit'!
2011	"Ne ubezhat'"	Tantsuy, chtoby zhit'!
2012	"LA"	Tantsuy, chtoby zhit'!
2013	"Kuda privodyat mechty"	Myuzikl ChISo 4102
2013	"Hit the Red Light"	TBA
2013	"Olimpiyskiy tanets"	Torch relay of the Olympic fire Sochi 2014
2015	"Tantsuy, moya devochka"	TBA

== Videography ==
Year	Clip	Album	Producer	Ref.
2010	"Dyshi glubzhe"	Tantsuy, chtoby zhit'!	Andrey Sergeev	
2010	"Oskolki"	Tantsuy, chtoby zhit'!	Alexey Dubrovin	
2011	"Prekrasnaya lozh'"	Tantsuy, chtoby zhit'!	Alan Badoev	
2012	"Ne ubezhat'"	Tantsuy, chtoby zhit'!	Alan Badoev	
2012	"It’s all right"	Tantsuy, chtoby zhit'!	Maxim Iksanov	
2012	"So mnoy po-drugomu nel'zya!"	Tantsuy, chtoby zhit'!	Konstantin Cherepkov	
2012	"Prekrasnaya lozh'" in conjunction with DJ Romeo	Tantsuy, chtoby zhit'!	Alexey Treiman	
2013	"LA"	Tantsuy, chtoby zhit'!	Alan Badoev	
2013	"Hit the Red Light"	TBA	Konstantin Cherepkov	
2014	"Samaya yarkaya zvezda"	TBA	Konstantin Cherepkov	
2014	"Olimpiyskiy tanets"	TBA	Evgeny Kamnev	
2015	"High Enough"	TBA	Serghey Grey	
