= Rich White Ladies =

American hip hop duo

- Genres: Pop hip hop
- Members: Tokyo Diiva; Scotty Rebel

Rich White Ladies is an American pop/rap music duo. Singers Tokyo Diiva and Scotty Rebel were both raised in the Bronx where they met.

The exorbitant lifestyles of the wealthy are a recurring theme in their music. In 2012 the duo released the singles "One Percent" and "White Powder Perm".

The videos for "No Bad Vibez" and "Wimbledon" were directed by Frederic Esnault. The "Wimbledon" video has cameos from Justin Tranter and Cole Whittle of Semi Precious Weapons.

The Rich White Ladies released a self-titled EP with Motown Records in April 2015. They were preparing their major label debut with Tricky Stewart that same year.

They released the singles "Love is For the WEEK" in 2017 and "Girlfriend" in 2019.
