= Family (LeAnn Rimes album) =

Studio album by LeAnn Rimes
- Released: October 9, 2007
- Studios: Blackbird Studio and Starstruck Studios (Nashville, Tennessee); Sound Kitchen (Franklin, Tennessee); The Sound House (Hollywood, California); Record Plant (Los Angeles, California)
- Genre: Country
- Length: 57:07
- Label: Curb
- Producers: Dann Huff; Tony Brown; Reba McEntire

LeAnn Rimes chronology
Whatever We Wanna (2006)	Family (2007)	Lady & Gentlemen (2011)

Singles from Family
- 1. "Nothin' Better to Do" Released: May 29, 2007; 2. "Good Friend and a Glass of Wine" Released: March 15, 2008; 3. "What I Cannot Change" Released: August 25, 2008

Family is the eleventh studio album by American singer LeAnn Rimes, released October 9, 2007, by Curb Records in the United States. It was produced primarily by musician and record producer Dann Huff, with additional production by Tony Brown and guest vocalist Reba McEntire.

Family is the first album in Rimes' career where she has co-written every song for an album.

The album debuted at number four on the US Billboard 200 chart, selling 74,200 copies in its first week. Upon its release, Family received positive reviews from most music critics, who complimented Rimes' performance and songwriting. The lead single "Nothin' Better to Do" earned her a Grammy Award nomination for Best Female Country Vocal Performance while the third single "What I Cannot Change" also earned her a nomination the following year .

== Singles ==
The first single, "Nothin' Better to Do", was released to radio on May 29, 2007 which she was nominated for a Best Female Country Vocal Performance Grammy for the 50th Grammy Awards, followed by "Good Friend and a Glass of Wine" and "What I Cannot Change," which was nominated for a Best Female Country Vocal Performance Grammy for the 51st Grammy Awards and went to number one on the Billboard Dance chart.

== Reception ==
=== Commercial performance ===
The album debuted at number four on the US Billboard 200 chart, with first-week sales of 74,200 copies in the United States. It spent a total of 20 weeks in Billboard 200. As of July 2011 it has sold 401,000 copies in United States.

In the United Kingdom, Family debuted at number 31 on the UK Albums Chart, becoming Rimes's first album to miss the top 20 of the chart (though not all of her albums were released in the UK).

=== Critical response ===
Professional ratings
Aggregate scores
Source	Rating
Metacritic	(70/100)
Review scores
Source	Rating
Allmusic	4/5 stars
Billboard	(favorable)
Blender	4/5 stars
The Boston Globe	(favorable)
Entertainment Weekly	B
The Guardian	3/5 stars
The New York Times	(favorable)
Rolling Stone	3.5/5 stars
Slant Magazine	4/5 stars
Uncut	2/5 stars

Family received positive reviews from most music critics. At Metacritic, which assigns a normalized rating out of 100 to reviews from mainstream critics, the album received an average score of 70, based on 12 reviews, which indicates "generally favorable reviews". Allmusic editor Stephen Thomas Erlewine gave it four out of five stars and called it "surprisingly far-ranging underneath its soft country-pop veneer [...] a canny blend of the commercial and the confessional". Blender's Jane Dark complimented its "lighthearted genre-hopping", writing that it "suggests nothing so much as a Broadway smash about a restless country star, borrowing from many styles, beholden to none." Sarah Rodman of The Boston Globe praised Rimes' songwriting and dubbed Family "the best, most cogent album of her career". Kelefa Sanneh of The New York Times complimented her "gentle belting-out" and commented that "the music echoes the fearlessness in the lyrics". Slant Magazine's Jonathan Keefe called Rimes "a distinctive interpretive singer" and viewed that her songwriting gives the album "the kind of focus and thematic coherence that most Nashville acts can't be bothered with". Keefe cited Family as "among the strongest mainstream country albums of the past several years". Ken Tucker of Billboard gave the album a favorable review and said, "It took personal experience for LeAnn Rimes to get to the point where she could write, record and release Family, the sum of a so-far extraordinary but still young life. But just because it's a personal album doesn't mean it doesn't speak to the masses."

However, Q gave the album two out of five stars and stated "There's little spark, despite her admirable willingness to take chances." Entertainment Weekly's Alanna Nash gave it a B rating and commented that "Rimes displays new maturity in songwriting [...] though too often she lapses into posturing power pop". Adam Sweeting of Uncut criticized its music, writing that the songs "sound like an update of the kind of AOR racket Pat Benatar and Heart were making in the '80s". Dave Simpson of The Guardian noted "A slightly too-smooth production and typically overblown Bon Jovi collaboration", but called it "an album full of swaggering rhythm'n'booze and emotional confessionals that explore a dysfunctional childhood". Despite finding the song "uneven", Rolling Stone writer Rob Sheffield gave the album three-and-a-half out of five stars and cited "Nothin' Better to Do", "Family", and "Till We Ain't Strangers Anymore" as highlights. Thomas Kintner of The Hartford Courant called Family "a carefully manicured, but still lively assortment that highlights her substantial vocal strengths", and praised Rimes' singing, stating "She is prone to embracing tunes so disposable that they should be beneath her notice, but the melodic richness she showers on even the most lackluster lyrics makes for interesting listening".

== Track listing ==
No.	Title	Writer(s)	Length
1.	"Family"	LeAnn Rimes, Dean Sheremet, Blair Daly	3:55
2.	"Nothin' Better to Do"	Rimes, Sheremet, Darrell Brown	4:26
3.	"Fight"	Rimes, Brown, Daly	3:27
4.	"Good Friend and a Glass of Wine"	Rimes, Brown, Daly	3:34
5.	"Something I Can Feel"	Rimes, Brown, Daly	3:43
6.	"I Want You with Me"	Rimes, Sheremet, Daly	3:33
7.	"Doesn't Everybody"	Rimes, Sheremet, Brown	3:53
8.	"Nothing Wrong" (with Marc Broussard)	Rimes, Broussard, Daly	4:22
9.	"Pretty Things"	Rimes, Sheremet, Brown	3:45
10.	"Upper Hand"	Rimes, Brown, Troy Verges	3:51
11.	"One Day Too Long"	Rimes, Sheremet, Brown	3:38
12.	"What I Cannot Change"	Rimes, Brown	5:14
Total length:			57:07

Bonus Tracks
No.	Title	Writer(s)	Length
13.	"Till We Ain't Strangers Anymore" (with Bon Jovi) (From Bon Jovi's Lost Highway)	Jon Bon Jovi, Richie Sambora, Brett James	4:48
14.	"When You Love Someone Like That" (with Reba McEntire) (From McEntire's Reba: Duets)	Ed Hill, Karyn Rochelle	4:40
Total length:			66:35

== Personnel ==
Credits for Family adapted from Allmusic.

Musicians

- LeAnn Rimes – lead vocals, backing vocals (1, 4, 7, 9, 10, 12)
- Rami Jaffee – Hammond B3 organ (1, 3)
- Tim Lauer – keyboards (1), Casio keyboard (2, 10), Farfisa organ (2), acoustic piano (3, 7), Mellotron (3), Solina String Machine (3), organ (8, 12), synthesizers (9, 10, 12), accordion (9), Hammond M3 organ (11)
- Tim Akers – Wurlitzer electric piano (2, 7, 8), keyboards (4–6), organ (7), acoustic piano (9–12)
- Charles Judge – keyboards (4–6, 9, 12), synthesizers (13), programming (13), string arrangements and conductor (13)
- Steve Nathan – acoustic piano (13), Hammond B3 organ (13)
- Matt Rollings – acoustic piano (14), Hammond B3 organ (14)
- Dann Huff – acoustic guitar (1, 3), guitars (2, 4–12)
- Stuart Mathis – electric guitar (1, 3), guitars (2, 7–12)
- Kenny Greenberg – guitars (4–6)
- Tom Bukovac – electric guitar (14)
- Michael Thompson – acoustic guitar (14), electric guitar (14)
- Jonathan Yudkin – banjo (2), fiddle (5, 11, 13), mandolin (6)
- Paul Franklin – steel guitar (3, 5–9, 13)
- Dan Dugmore – steel guitar (4, 5, 13)
- JayDee Maness – steel guitar (14)
- Jimmie Lee Sloas – bass (1–12)
- Leland Sklar – bass (14)
- Chris McHugh – drums (1–12)
- Russ Kunkel – drums (14)
- Eric Darken – percussion (1–10, 12, 13)
- Doug Moffet – baritone saxophone (11)
- Mark Douthit – tenor saxophone (11)
- Barry Green – trombone (11)
- Mike Haynes – trumpet (11)
- Michael Omartian – horn arrangements (11)
- John Catchings – cello (12)
- Carole Rabinowitz-Neuen – cello (13)
- Kris Wilkinson – viola (13)
- Carl Gorodetzky – violin (13)
- Pamela Sixfin – violin (13)
- Joanna Janét – backing vocals (1–6, 10)
- Marc Broussard – vocals (8)
- Jon Bon Jovi – vocals (13)
- Reba McEntire – vocals (14)

Production

- Dann Huff – producer (1–13)
- Tony Brown – producer (14)
- Reba McEntire – producer (14)
- Terry Christian – recording (1–13)
- Richard Dodd – recording (1–13)
- Ben Fowler – recording (1–13)
- Mark Hagen – recording (1–13), overdub recording (1–13)
- Mike Butler – recording (14)
- Derek Bason – additional recording (14)
- Justin Niebank – mixing (1–13)
- Steve Marcantonio – mixing (14)
- Scott Kidd – recording assistant (1–13)
- John Netti – recording assistant (1–13)
- Nate Hertweck – recording assistant (14)
- Todd Tidwell – additional recording assistant (14)
- Seth Morton – overdub assistant (1–13)
- Lowell Reynolds – overdub assistant (1–13)
- Drew Bollman – mix assistant (1–13)
- J.C. Monterrosa – mix assistant (14)
- Gateway Mastering (Portland, Maine) – mastering location
- Darrell Franklin – A&R coordinator
- Mike "Frog" Griffith – production coordinator
- John Coulter – CD design
- David McClister – photography
- Jillian Rubinger – stylist
- Nathaniel Hawkins – hair stylist
- Troy Surratt – make-up
- Fitzgerald/Hartley Co. – management

== Charts ==
=== Weekly charts ===
Chart (2007)	Peak position
Australian Albums (ARIA)	180
Australian Top Country Albums	20
European Top 100 Albums	100
Swiss Albums Chart	68
UK Albums Chart	31
US Billboard 200	4
US Billboard Top Country Albums	2
US Billboard Top Digital Albums	4

=== Year-end charts ===
Chart (2007)	Position
US Billboard Top Country Albums	61
Chart (2008)	Position
US Billboard Top Country Albums	31

== Release history ==
Country	Date
United States	October 9, 2007
Australia	October 15, 2007
