= Tonight (Blondie song) =

Promotional single by: Blondie featuring Laurie Anderson

from the album Pollinator
- Released: April 29, 2017
- Recorded: 2016
- Genre: Pop rock; new wave
- Length: 4:35
- Label: BMG; Infectious Music
- Songwriters: Charlotte Aitchison; Andrew Armstrong
- Producer: John Congleton

"Tonight" is a song by American rock band Blondie featuring American musician Laurie Anderson. It was written by Charli XCX and Andrew Armstrong, produced by John Congleton and mixed by Chris Sheldon.

It was released on April 27, 2017, as a special 1000 copies limited edition one-sided 7" promotional single, sold exclusively at Blondie's pop up shop at the Camden Market. It has also appeared as a hidden track after "Fragments" on the CD edition of the Pollinator album.

== Track listing ==
7-inch single
No.	Title	Writer(s)	Length
1.	"Tonight"	Charlotte Aitchison, Andrew Armstrong	5:26
