= Crazy Women =

2010 single by LeAnn Rimes

Single by LeAnn Rimes

from the album Lady & Gentlemen
- Released: December 10, 2010
- Recorded: 2010
- Genre: Country
- Length: 3:23
- Label: Curb
- Songwriter(s): Brandy Clark, Jessie Jo Dillon, Shane McAnally
- Producer(s): Vince Gill, Darrell Brown, LeAnn Rimes

LeAnn Rimes singles chronology
"Swingin'" (2010)	"Crazy Women" (2010)	"Give" (2011)

Audio sample
- A twenty-nine second sample of "Crazy Women" as heard on Lady & Gentlemen: file; help

"Crazy Women" is a song recorded by American country pop artist LeAnn Rimes, and released as the second single from her tenth studio album, Lady & Gentlemen, on December 10, 2010. The song peaked at number 40 on the Billboard Country Songs chart.

== Content ==
"Crazy Women" is a country song written by Brandy Clark, Jessie Jo Dillon, and Shane McAnally. In it, the female narrator contemplates that women are driven to craziness by their male counterparts ("Oh no, crazy women are made by crazy men"). The song's first verse describes a woman torching her significant other's car while he is in a bar, and in the second, finds him venting that he's the victim of undeserved scorn in spite of his cheating and lying ways. The bridge details that any woman, regardless of their outward appearance, has the capacity to be crazy if mistreated by her man.

The song was later recorded by one of its co-writers, Brandy Clark, for her 2013 debut album, 12 Stories.

== Critical reception ==
Bobby Peacock of Roughstock gave it four stars out of five, saying that it "makes itself known right away with crisp, clear, gritty guitar". He also praised Rimes' vocals. It received a "thumbs up" from Karlie Justus of Engine 145, who called it "a successful, stylish thinking woman’s tale of revenge that holds up well despite its surface glitz."

== Chart ==
Chart (2010–2011)	Peak position
US Country Songs (Billboard)	40
