= What I Cannot Change =

- Remix EP artwork

Single by LeAnn Rimes

from the album Family
- Released: August 25, 2008
- Genre: Country
- Length: 5:14 (album version) 4:00 (radio edit)
- Label: Asylum-Curb
- Songwriter(s): Darrell Brown; LeAnn Rimes
- Producer(s): Dann Huff

LeAnn Rimes singles chronology
"Good Friend and a Glass of Wine" (2008)	"What I Cannot Change" (2008)	"When It's Good" (2009)

"What I Cannot Change" is a song written by Darrell Brown, and co-written and recorded by American country artist LeAnn Rimes. The song was released to country radio in August 2008 as the third and final single from her ninth studio album, Family (2007). The song was later supported by a set of dance remixes, released in November 2008. The song reached number one on the Dance Club Songs chart.

"What I Cannot Change" was praised by critics for Rimes's restrained vocal performance, however the song failed to enter the country charts following its release. The single received a nomination for Best Female Country Vocal Performance at the 2009 Grammy Awards, her second consecutive nomination in the category.

The song inspired Rimes to release a book of the same name and launch a "What I Cannot Change" website where fans could share stories of moments where they came to terms with what they could or could not change in their life.

== Content ==
"What I Cannot Change" (2008)
A 30 second sample of LeAnn Rimes' "What I Cannot Change", featuring the chorus.

"What I Cannot Change" is a ballad, revealing examination of love relationships and choosing acceptance instead of conflict. The song's chorus is a play on the first line of the Serenity Prayer. According to the digital sheet music published by Hal Leonard Music Publishing, the song was composed in the key of G major and set to a "slow" tempo of 72 BPM. Rimes's vocals in the song range from a low note of G_{3} to a high note of D_{5}.

== Critical reception ==
Writing for Billboard, Deborah Evans Price called the song a "gorgeous ballad" on which Rimes has never sounded "more emotionally riveting or vulnerable," resulting in her "finest performance ever." Country Universe also praised "What I Cannot Change," calling the ballad, "the finest single of LeAnn Rimes' career." Reviewer Kevin Coyne praised the singer's "nuance," using "all of the shades of her voice to communicate the complicated mess of emotions that she is feeling." The 9513 also reviewed the single and praised Rimes's vocal performance, calling her vocals, "a tremendously sensitive vocal performance that is easily one of the most nuanced of Rimes’ career." In a review of Family, Jonathan Keefe of Slant praised the "lovely" song as "the most subtle, understated performance of her career." Matt Bjorke of Roughstock ranked "What I Cannot Change" as the fourth-best country single of 2008 and expressed disappointment at the song's lack of chart success. "No song she's recorded has quite matched this single," writes Bjorke, calling it, "a mature single from a mature album by a mature artist."

== Chart performance ==
"What I Cannot Change" failed to enter the Billboard Hot Country Songs chart after being released to radio in August 2008. A few months later, however, the song was given several electronic dance music remixes and debuted on the Billboard Hot Dance Club Play chart in late 2008. "What I Can't Change" reached #1 on the chart dated February 28, 2009. It became the first country song to top the Billboard dance chart, surpassing Reba McEntire's previous record-best peak of two on the Dance Club Play chart with her cover of The Supremes' "You Keep Me Hangin' On".

== Usage in media ==
The song was used in the 2010 release of the film, Like Dandelion Dust.

== Track listings ==
Remixes EP

1. What I Cannot Change [Kaskade Radio Mix] – 3:41
2. What I Cannot Change [Jody Den Broeder Radio Mix] – 4:43
3. What I Cannot Change [Scotty K Radio Mix] – 4:19
4. What I Cannot Change [Bronleewe & Bose Radio Mix] – 4:01
5. Good Friend And A Glass Of Wine [Wideboys Electro Radio Mix] – 3:33
6. Good Friend And A Glass Of Wine [Soul Seekerz Radio Mix] – 3:32
7. Headphones [Almighty Radio Mix] – 3:37

Extended Mixes EP

1. What I Cannot Change [Kaskade Extended Mix] – 5:08
2. What I Cannot Change [Jody den Broeder Extended Mix] – 8:03
3. What I Cannot Change [Scotty K Klub Mix] – 8:12
4. What I Cannot Change [Bronleewe & Bose Extended Mix] – 6:25
5. Good Friend And A Glass Of Wine [Wideboys Electro Mix] – 5:49
6. Good Friend And A Glass Of Wine [Soul Seekerz Extended Mix] – 8:54
7. Headphones [Almighty Extended Mix] – 8:01

What I Cannot Change Exclusive CD Released with the book of the same name by LeAnn Rimes and Darrell Brown

1. What I Cannot Change (Live) – 4:34
2. Spoken Words – 23:17

Promo CD single

1. What I Cannot Change (Radio Edit) – 3:40

== Charts ==
=== Weekly charts ===
Chart (2009)	Peak position
US Dance Club Songs (Billboard)	1

=== Year end charts ===
Chart (2009)	Position
US Dance Club Songs (Billboard)	33

== Release history ==
Country	Date	Format	Version	Label	Ref.
United States	August 25, 2008	Country radio	Original	Curb	
Worldwide	November 18, 2008	Digital download	Extended mixes EP	Curb	
Worldwide	November 18, 2008	Digital download	Remixes EP	Curb	
