= LeAnn Rimes videography =

American singer videography

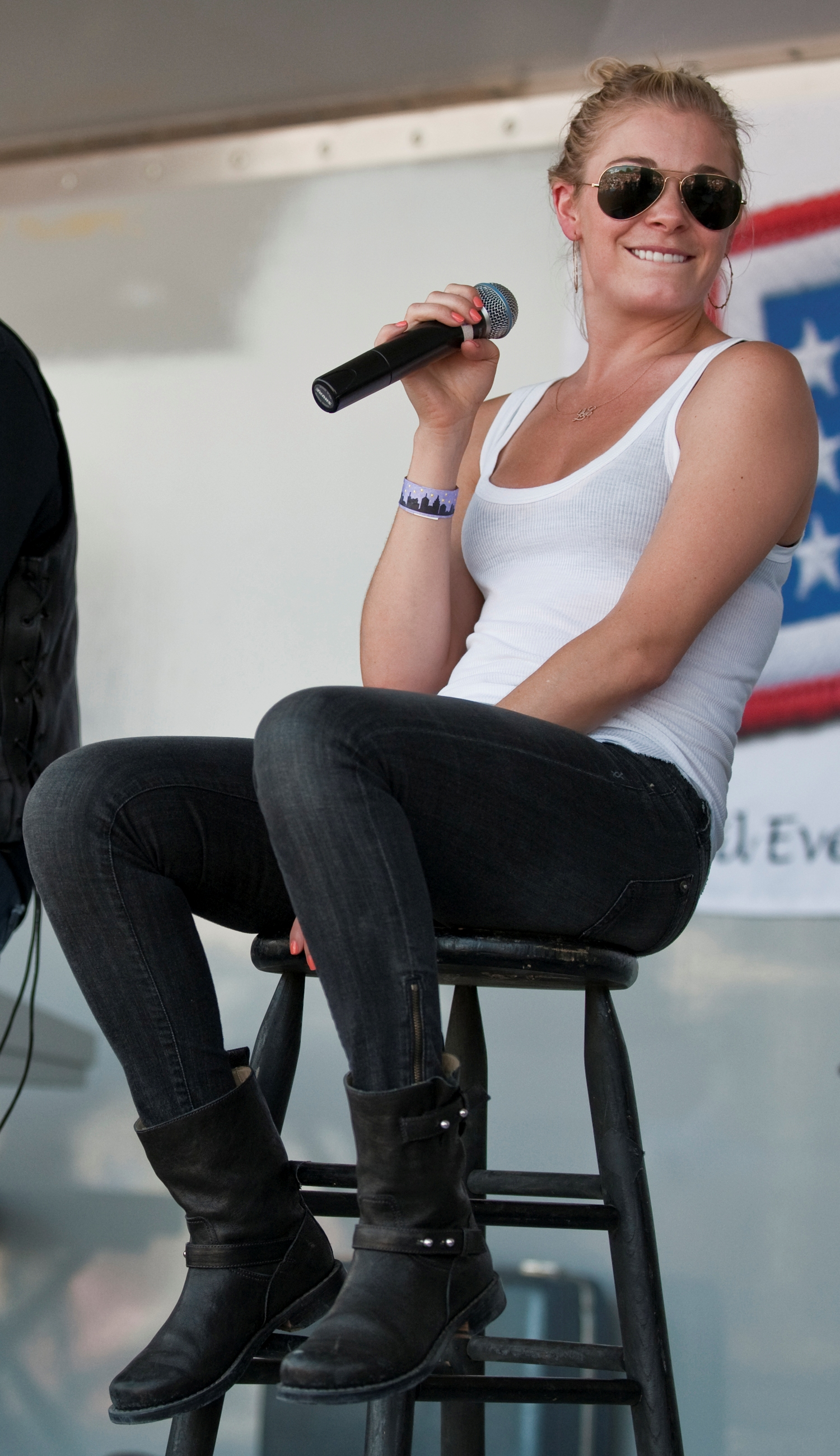
LeAnn Rimes onstage, 2000s

American singer LeAnn Rimes has released two video albums and appeared in 43 music videos. In 1996, she made her debut music video with the single "Blue". It was followed by the videos "One Way Ticket (Because I Can)", "The Light in Your Eyes", "How Do I Live" and "Amazing Grace". These videos were directed by chris rogers. It was not until 2000 that Rimes began working with different video directors. That year she collaborated with Joseph Kahn and Joey Rey on the video for her single "I Need You". David McNally then directed her next video for "Can't Fight the Moonlight". In 2005, Rimes formed a music video collaboration with David McClister for the songs "Probably Wouldn't Be This Way" and "Something's Gotta Give". The same year, Curb Records issued Rimes's debut video album titled The Best of LeAnn Rimes. The album was followed by her second release titled LeAnn Rimes: The Complete DVD Collection.

Rimes continued working with McClister on the music videos for "Some People", "Nothin' Better to Do" and her cover of "Swingin'". Starting in 2010, Rimes made five music videos with Nashville director Nigel Dick singles like "Give", "What Have I Done" and "Just a Girl Like You". Rimes then released two music videos in 2016. In addition to her music videos, Rimes has also appeared in several feature films and television films. In 1997, she acted in her first television film titled Holiday in Your Heart. It was followed by appearances in the movies Moesha (1999) and Coyote Ugly (2000). She has since appeared in the television films Holly Hobbie and Friends: Christmas Wishes (2006), Northern Lights (2009) and It's Christmas, Eve (2018).

== Video albums ==
Title	Album details
The Best of LeAnn Rimes	Released: February 2, 2004; Label: Curb; Format: DVD
LeAnn Rimes: The Complete DVD Collection	Released: October 2, 2006; Label: Warner Vision DVD; Format: DVD

== Music videos ==
=== As lead artist ===
Year	Title	Director(s)
1996	"The Light in Your Eyes"	chris rogers [sic]
1996	"Blue"	chris rogers [sic]
1996	"One Way Ticket (Because I Can)"	chris rogers [sic]
1997	"How Do I Live"	chris rogers [sic]
1997	"You Light Up My Life"	chris rogers [sic]
1997	"Amazing Grace"	chris rogers [sic]
1998	"Looking Through Your Eyes"	chris rogers [sic]
1998	"Commitment"	
1999	"Big Deal"	
2000	"I Need You"	Joseph Kahn/Joe Rey
2000	"Can't Fight the Moonlight"	David McNally
2002	"But I Do Love You"	
2002	"Life Goes On"	Matthew Rolston
2003	"Suddenly"	Cameron Casey
2003	"We Can"	Liz Friedlander
2004	"This Love"	Steven Goldmann
2004	"Nothin' 'bout Love Makes Sense"	Kristin Barlowe
2005	"Probably Wouldn't Be This Way"	David McClister
2006	"Something's Gotta Give"	David McClister
2006	"And It Feels Like"	
2006	"Everybody's Someone" (with Brian McFadden)	
2006	"Some People"	David McClister
2007	"Strong"	
2007	"Nothin' Better to Do"	David McClister/LeAnn Rimes
2007	"Ready for a Miracle"	
2008	"Good Friend and a Glass of Wine"	Phil Griffin
2010	"Swingin'"	David McClister
2011	"Give"	Nigel Dick
2012	"What Have I Done"	Nigel Dick
2013	"Borrowed"	Nigel Dick
2013	"Spitfire"	Nigel Dick
2013	"Just a Girl Like You"	Nigel Dick
2013	"Who We Really Are"	
2013	"Gasoline and Matches"	Ian Padgham
2016	"The Story"	Isaac Rentz
2016	"How to Kiss a Boy"	Laurence Warder
2022	"Spaceship"	Eddie Cibrian

=== Guest appearance ===
Year	Title	Director	Artist	Notes
1999	"Written in the Stars"	New Renaissance	Elton John	Cameo and vocals
2004	"Last Thing on My Mind"	Urban Ström	Ronan Keating	Cameo and vocals
2007	"Till We Ain't Strangers Anymore"	Phil Griffin	Bon Jovi	Cameo and vocals
2009	"When It's Good"	Christopher Sims	Marc Broussard	Cameo and vocals
2012	"The Choice"	Sean Thomas	Various Artists	Vocals
2021	"I Do"	—	Aloe Blacc	Cameo and vocals 2022

== Filmography ==
Film and television
Year	Title	Role	Notes
1997	LeAnn Rimes in Concert	Herself	Disney Channel special
1997	Holiday in Your Heart	Herself	Television film
1998	Days of Our Lives	Madison	2 Episodes (April 30 & May 1)
1999	Moesha	Herself	Episode: "Ohmigod, Fanatic"
2000	Coyote Ugly	Herself	Also singing voice for Violet Sanford
2003	American Dreams	Connie Francis	Episode: "Where the Boys Are"
2004	Blue Collar TV	Herself	Episode: "The Human Body"
2006	Holly Hobbie and Friends: Christmas Wishes	Kelly Deegan	TV film
2009	Northern Lights	Meg Galligan	Television film (Lifetime)
2009	I Get That a Lot	Herself	April 1 episode
2010	Good Intentions	Pam	Film
2011	Drop Dead Diva	Lana Kline	Episode: "Hit and Run"
2011	Reel Love	Holly Whitman	Television film
2013	Anger Management	Wynona	Episode: "Charlie Dates a Serial Killer's Sister"
2014	LeAnn & Eddie	Herself	VH1 reality series (8 episodes)
2017	Logan Lucky	Herself	Film
2018	It's Christmas Eve	Eve Morgan	Television film (Hallmark)
2020	The Masked Singer	The Sun	Season 4 champion
2021, 2024	The Masked Singer	Herself	Guest panelist; Episode: "Finale" Performer; Episode: "Group B Premiere: The Wizard of Oz Night"
2021	Country Comfort	Herself	Episode: "Blue"
2024	Michael McIntyre's Big Show	Herself	Musical Guest
2024	The Voice Australia	Herself	Coach: Season 13
2024	The Voice UK	Herself	Coach: Series 13
2025	9-1-1: Nashville	Dixie Bennings	Main role
