= Whatever We Wanna =

Studio album by LeAnn Rimes
- Released: June 6, 2006
- Studios: Blackbird Studio, Emerald Entertainment, Quad Studios and Charlie's Place (Nashville, Tennessee); Capitol Studios and Vine Street Studios (Hollywood, California); O'Henry Sound Studios (Burbank, California)
- Genres: Pop; Rock; Country; World
- Length: 57:31
- Labels: Asylum-Curb; London
- Producers: Dann Huff; Gregg Pagani; Charlie Judge; Christopher Neil; Martin Sutton; Jeremy Wheatley

LeAnn Rimes chronology
This Woman (2005)	Whatever We Wanna (2006)	Family (2007)

Singles from Whatever We Wanna
- 1. "And It Feels Like" Released: May 5, 2006; 2. "Strong" Released: June 23, 2006; 3. "Everybody's Someone" Released: September 25, 2006

Whatever We Wanna is the tenth studio album by American singer LeAnn Rimes, released June 6, 2006. The album has a more rock-oriented sound than her previous work. The album was released and promoted exclusively in Europe, Taiwan, and Brazil. It was originally slated to be released in the U.S. (and even appeared in the US iTunes store briefly), however, the release was pulled due to the success of her single (from This Woman), "Something's Gotta Give" (which peaked at #2 on Billboard’s Top Country Songs), leading to an increase in sales of This Woman. A deluxe edition with three bonus remixes was released in the US on September 10, 2021, fifteen years after the original release.

== Singles ==
Three singles were released from the album. "And It Feels Like" was released as the lead single from the album on May 5, 2006. The second single, "Strong", was released in Germany on June 23, 2006. The third and final single from the album was Rimes' duet with Brian McFadden, "Everybody's Someone", which was released on September 25, 2006.

== Critical reception ==
Professional ratings
Review scores
Source	Rating
AllMusic	3/5 stars

AllMusic critic Sharon Mawer described Whatever We Wanna as a shift in Rimes's sound away from traditional country toward R&B and adult-oriented rock crossover, comparing its approach to the success of artists such as Shania Twain and Faith Hill. She noted that tracks like "Satisfied" and the title song embraced a stronger rock influence, while ballads such as "Strong," "This Life," and "For the First Time" returned to Rimes’ familiar country-influenced style, highlighting the album's mix of crossover ambition and emotional balladry.

== Track listing ==
Whatever We Wanna track listing
No.	Title	Writer(s)	Length
1.	"Satisfied"	Rimes, Sheppard Soloman, Thom Schuyler	3:50
2.	"And It Feels Like"	Sherena Dugani, Steve Robson, Schuyler	3:47
3.	"For the First Time"	Darrell Brown, Dennis Matkosky, Jess Cates	3:53
4.	"Save Myself"	Gordie Sampson, Rimes, Robson	3:56
5.	"A Little More Time"	Dean Sheremet, Gregg Pagani, Rimes, Paul Rabjohns	3:17
6.	"Rumour 'bout a Revolution"	Matkosky, Rimes, Ty Lacy	4:09
7.	"Destructive"	Matkosky, Rimes, Radney Foster	3:23
8.	"Strong"	Matkosky, Cates, Rimes	4:17
9.	"Whatever We Wanna"	Blair Daly, Matkosky, Rimes	3:26
10.	"Everybody's Someone" (With Brian McFadden)	Chris Neil, Martin Sutton	3:43
11.	"Headphones"	Daly, Matkosky, Rimes	3:27
12.	"Long Night"	Sampson, Rimes, Robson	3:33
13.	"This Life"	Gregory Becker, John White	4:09
14.	"Break Me Down"	Cates, Rimes, Lacy	3:53
15.	"Some People"	Brown, Matkosky, Joanna Cotten	4:42
Total length:			57:31

Taiwan Bonus Tracks
No.	Title	Writer(s)	Length
16.	"And It Feels Like" (Friday Night Posse Mix)	Dugani, Robson, Schuyler	7:52
17.	"Strong" (Cicada Mix)	Matkosky, Cates, Rimes	7:17
Total length:			72:40

Taiwan Bonus DVD
No.	Title	Length
1.	"And It Feels Like" (Karaoke Music Video)
2.	"Strong" (Karaoke Music Video)
3.	"And It Feels Like" (Behind The Scenes)
4.	"Hello From LeAnn Rimes"
5.	"Interview"

2021 Digital Deluxe Edition Bonus Tracks
No.	Title	Writer(s)	Length
16.	"Strong" (Cicada Mix)	Matkosky, Cates, Rimes	7:17
17.	"Headphones" (Almighty Radio Edit)	Daly, Matkosky, Rimes	3:39
18.	"And It Feels Like" (Hi-Tacks 'It Feels Damn Good' Mix)	Dugani, Robson, Schuyler	6:02

== Personnel ==
Credits for Whatever We Wanna were adapted from liner notes.

- LeAnn Rimes – vocals, backing vocals (1, 4, 6, 9, 11-13, 15)
- Charlie Judge – keyboards (1-4, 6-9, 11-13), programming (1-4, 6-9, 11-13)
- Gregg Pagani – keyboards (5), programming (5), guitars (5)
- Martin Sutton – keyboards (10), programming (10), guitars (10)
- Dann Huff – guitars (1, 2, 7, 8, 11, 13, 15), acoustic guitar (3, 4, 12, 14), electric guitar (3, 4, 14), sitar (3), electric guitar solo (3, 4, 14), guitar solo (6, 9), EBow (12)
- Tom Bukovac – guitars (2), electric guitar (3, 4, 9, 12, 14), electric slide guitar (12), guitar solo (12)
- Jay Joyce – guitars (2)
- Corky James – guitars (5)
- Kenny Greenberg – guitars (6)
- Jerry McPherson – guitars (6)
- Jimmie Lee Sloas – bass (2, 6, 14, 15)
- Jay DeMarcus – bass (3, 4, 12)
- Lance Morrison – bass (5)
- Chris McHugh – drums (1-4, 6-8, 11-15)
- Vinnie Colaiuta – drums (5)
- Brian Pruitt – drums (9)
- David Campbell – string arrangements and conductor (8)
- Lisa Cochran – backing vocals (1-3, 7, 14, 15)
- Brian McFadden – vocals (10)
- Bob Bailey – backing vocals (15)
- Vicki Hampton – backing vocals (15)

=== Production ===
- Ric Salmon – A&R
- Dann Huff – producer (1-4, 6-15)
- Jeremy Wheatley – additional production
- Charlie Judge – additional production (2, 7, 8, 12)
- Gregg Pagani – producer (5)
- Christopher Neil – additional production (10)
- Martin Sutton – additional production (10)
- Darrell Franklin – A&R coordinator
- Mike "Frog" Griffith – production coordinator
- Shari Sutcliffe – contractor (5)
- James Cokell – sleeve design
- Mark Liddell – photography
- Mark Hartley for Fitzgerald/Hartley Management Co. – management

Technical credits

- Dick Beetham – mastering at 360 Mastering (London, UK)
- Jeremy Wheatley – mixing at Twenty One Studios (London, UK)
- Brio Taliaferro – additional programming
- Mark Hagen – recording (1-4, 6-15)
- Mills Logan – recording (1-4, 6-15)
- Justin Niebank – recording (1-4, 6-15)
- Jess Sutcliffe – recording (5)
- Steve Churchyard – string recording (8)
- Dino Herrmann – Pro Tools engineer (8)
- Adam Dye – recording assistant (1-4, 6-15)
- Greg Lawrence – recording assistant (1-4, 6-15)
- Seth Morton – recording assistant (1-4, 6-15)
- Charlie Paakkari – assistant engineer (5)

== Charts ==
Weekly chart performance for Whatever We Wanna
Chart (2006)	Peak position
Austrian Albums (Ö3 Austria)	61
German Albums (Offizielle Top 100)	65
Irish Albums (IRMA)	43
Swiss Albums (Schweizer Hitparade)	42
UK Albums (Official Charts)	15

== Release history ==
Whatever We Wanna release history
Region	Date	Catalog	Ref.
Germany	June 2, 2006	B000FMH9TS	
United Kingdom	June 6, 2006	2564634142	
Taiwan	5051011519925	July 14, 2006	
Brazil	July 18, 2006	5051011408229	
United States	September 10, 2021	N/A	
