= Some People =

Some People may refer to:

- Some People (film), 1962
- Some People, a 1927 novel by Harold Nicolson
- "Some People", song by LeAnn Rimes

== Music ==
=== Albums ===
- Some People (Jon English album), 1983
- Some People (Belouis Some album), 1985

=== Songs ===
- "Some People" (Belouis Some song), 1985
- "Some People" (Cliff Richard song), 1987
- "Some People" (LeAnn Rimes song), 2006
- "Some People" (E. G. Daily song), 1989
- "Some People", by Janis Ian from her 1978 self-titled album
- "Some People", by Fra Lippo Lippi from the 1987 album Light and Shade
- "Some People (Ton désir)", by Ocean Drive, 2009
- "Some People", by James Reyne from the 1991 album Electric Digger Dandy
- "Some People", from the 1959 musical Gypsy
- "Some People", by Anne-Marie from the deluxe edition of the 2018 album Speak Your Mind
- "Some People", by Goldfrapp from the 2008 album Seventh Tree
