= Cassandra O'Neal =

American singer-songwriter

- Also known as: Cassy
- Born: Cassandra Louise O'Neal; January 17, 1973 (age 53)
- Origin: Copiague, New York
- Genres: Gospel, pop, funk
- Occupations: Singer-songwriter, musician, keyboardist, composer
- Instruments: keyboard, vocals
- Years active: 1991–present
- Formerly of: New Power Generation
- Website: http://www.facebook.com/CassyQTKeys

Cassandra O'Neal (born Cassandra Louise O'Neal on January 17, 1973) is an American musician, composer, and recording artist. Best known as keyboard player (2009–2016) with Prince and The New Power Generation, she has an impressive resume of work with major industry (gospel, pop and funk) artists for over twenty-five (25) years.

== Early life ==
O'Neal is the youngest child born to the late Rev. Ernest A. O'Neal and Janet Pricilla O'Neal in Copiague, New York. O'Neal showed her musical potential at a young age, playing the piano by ear and with perfect pitch, beginning at the age of 3. Throughout her adolescent years, she nurtured her gift with formal classical piano training, playing in the church and by listening to all types of music, including new wave, rock, gospel and pop. During her junior and senior high school years she accompanied school choruses and ensembles.

== Music career ==
In 1991, Cassandra moved to Los Angeles, California. Shortly after, she received her break into the music industry while touring gospel singer, Daryl Coley. O'Neal then became a staff musician at the West Angeles Church of God in Christ under the leadership of Bishop Charles E. Blake. She later released a gospel instructional DVD entitled "Wheatworks Productions Presents…West Coast Piano: The Ultimate Gospel Piano Master Class Featuring Cassandra O'Neal". O'Neal worked on the soundtrack of the 1997 Comedy Film, The 6th Man, adding keyboards and vocals to the song, "Deeper Than Blood" performed by Sovory, which charted at No. 33 on the Billboard Top R&B/HipHop Albums chart.

O'Neal has since gone on to work with many of R&B, Pop and Gospel music's biggest acts, including Pink and her Party Tour in 2002. She has worked with 98 Degrees, Kurt Carr & the Kurt Carr Singers, Helen Baylor, Avant, and Chanté Moore. In 2005, she toured with Yolanda Adams, Martha Munizzi, and Sheila E. on Sisters in the Spirit Tour. She was also named musical director for Macy Gray in 2004 until 2007. In 2006, O'Neal joined Sy Smith as her keyboardist/supporting vocalist in Smith's band "Deeznuts". O'Neal also played keyboards on the Dreamgirls: Music from the Motion Picture Deluxe Edition Soundtrack.

In 2008, she joined Mary J. Blige and Jay-Z on the Heart of the City Tour. Adding to her credit, O'Neal has played keyboards on various recordings including LeAnn Rimes' What a Wonderful World, So Amazing: An All-Star Tribute to Luther Vandross, BabyFace's Grown & Sexy, and Mindi Abair's In Hi-Fi Stereo. She was also a member of all female band COED (Chronicles Of Every Diva) which featured Sheila E. O'Neal has also performed on various television shows such as The Ellen DeGeneres Show, The Tonight Show with Jay Leno, the 2002 MTV Video Music Awards, and the 36th NAACP Image Awards. O'Neal was also co-writer of several songs on Macy Gray's comeback album, BIG.

O'Neal joined Prince in his highly acclaimed band, The New Power Generation, alongside longtime members Morris Hayes on keyboards and John Blackwell on drums. O'Neal's first performances as a member of the NPG were at the Grand Palais and La Cigale concerts in France back in October 2009.

She has since appeared on Prince's 20Ten Tour, Welcome 2 America with a line-up of special guests such as Larry Graham, Maceo Parker, Chaka Khan, Raphael Saadiq, Janelle Monáe, Nikka Costa, and Paloma Faith. Tour, the 2011 Montreal Jazz Festival Special Performance, and the Welcome 2 America Euro 2011 Tour that introduced the first NPG Music & Arts Festival. O'Neal continued performing with Prince until 2014. Her latest performance with The New Power Generation was during the 2016 Official Prince Tribute Concert, Minneapolis MN, where she sang "The Ladder" (a duet) with Andre Cymone.

Cassandra endorses Yamaha Motif keyboards, Hammond organs and Quik Lok Stands.

== Releases ==
- West Coast Piano Instructional DVD
