= This Woman (LeAnn Rimes album) =

Studio album by LeAnn Rimes
- Released: January 25, 2005
- Recorded: 2004
- Studio: Emerald Entertainment, Sound Kitchen and Jane's Place (Nashville, Tennessee)
- Genre: Country pop
- Length: 44:02
- Label: Asylum-Curb
- Producer: Dann Huff

LeAnn Rimes chronology
What a Wonderful World (2004)	This Woman (2005)	Whatever We Wanna (2006)

Singles from This Woman
- 1. "Nothin' 'bout Love Makes Sense" Released: August 30, 2004; 2. "Probably Wouldn't Be This Way" Released: March 21, 2005; 3. "Something's Gotta Give" Released: December 12, 2005; 4. "Some People" Released: July 10, 2006

This Woman is the ninth studio album by American singer LeAnn Rimes, released on January 25, 2005. While promoting This Woman, she stated that it was her return to her "roots", country music. The album has a theme of falling in love and marriage. It was a success on the country charts. Rimes co-wrote three tracks on the album: "You Take Me Home", "I Got It Bad" and "When This Woman Loves a Man".

Singles from the album include, in order of release, "Nothin' 'bout Love Makes Sense", "Probably Wouldn't Be This Way", "Something's Gotta Give" and "Some People". Respectively, these reached #5, #3, #2, and #36 on the country singles charts.

A bonus thirteenth track, "Afraid to Fall", was released exclusively to US Target stores. Rimes helped pen this track as well.

== Reception ==
Professional ratings
Review scores
Source	Rating
AllMusic	4/5 stars
Entertainment Weekly	B−
Country Standard Time	Favorable

Stephen Thomas Erlewine of Allmusic gave the album four out of five stars stating that there were "no knockouts" on the album but that it was Rimes' "strongest album yet", while Entertainment Weekly gave the album a B− minus rating calling Rimes' vocals "creepy" but said it was "better news" that Rimes was " done making dance-pop records" while praising the songs "With You", "I Got It Bad", and "Something's Gotta Give" as "serious roll-the-windows-down country-radio fun" and stating that the Target exclusive bonus track "Afraid to Fall" is "dreamy" and that Rimes "quits acting like she's an adult and just is one...and the difference is joyfully clear."

== Track listing ==
No.	Title	Writer(s)	Length
1.	"I Want to with You"	Rivers Rutherford, Tom Shapiro	3:18
2.	"You Take Me Home"	Dennis Matkosky, LeAnn Rimes, Craig Wiseman	3:55
3.	"Something's Gotta Give"	Tony Mullins, Wiseman	3:56
4.	"Won't Be Lonely Long"	Melissa Peirce, Bobby Pinson	3:24
5.	"Nothin' 'bout Love Makes Sense"	Gary Burr, Joel Feeney, Kylie Sackley	2:57
6.	"Probably Wouldn't Be This Way"	John Kennedy, Tammi Kidd	3:37
7.	"The Weight of Love"	Marcel	4:04
8.	"With You"	Steve Robson, Jeffrey Steele	3:42
9.	"I Got It Bad"	Trey Bruce, Rimes, Dean Sheremet	3:28
10.	"I Dare You"	Jason Deere, Kristyn Osborn	3:43
11.	"When This Woman Loves a Man"	Blair Daly, Rimes, Troy Verges	4:02
12.	"Some People"	Darrell Brown, Joanna Cotten, Matkosky	3:56
Total length:			44:02

Target exclusive bonus track
No.	Title	Writer(s)	Length
13.	"Afraid to Fall"	Rimes, Peter Amato, Trey Bruce	4:01
Total length:			48:03

== Personnel ==
Credits for This Woman were adapted from liner notes.

- LeAnn Rimes – lead vocals
- Steve Nathan – keyboards (1–4, 7, 11)
- Charlie Judge – keyboards (4, 6, 8, 9, 12)
- Tim Akers – keyboards (5–10, 12), accordion (7)
- Tom Bukovac – guitars (1–4, 11), electric guitar (5–10, 12)
- Dann Huff – guitars (1–3, 11), electric guitar (5, 7–9, 12), acoustic guitar (6, 12)
- J. T. Corenflos – guitars (3)
- Jay Joyce – guitars (4, 11)
- B. James Lowry – acoustic guitar (5, 7–9)
- Keith Urban – electric guitar solo (7) (Note: Keith Urban appears courtesy of Capitol Records Nashville.)
- John Willis – acoustic guitar (10)
- Dan Dugmore – steel guitar (1–4, 7, 9, 11)
- Paul Franklin – steel guitar (5, 8, 10)
- Bruce Bouton – dobro (6)
- Jonathan Yudkin – mandolin (1, 5–8), fiddle (3–5, 8–10), banjo (9)
- Jimmie Lee Sloas – bass (1–6, 8, 11, 12)
- Glenn Worf – bass (7)
- Mike Brignardello – bass (9, 10)
- Chris McHugh – drums (1–4, 11)
- Vinnie Colaiuta – drums (5, 6, 8, 12)
- Shannon Forrest – drums (7, 9)
- Lonnie Wilson – drums (10)
- Eric Darken – percussion
- Perry Coleman – backing vocals (1–4, 7, 10)
- Joanna Janét – backing vocals (1–4)
- Lisa Cochran – backing vocals (5, 8, 10)
- Russell Terrell – backing vocals (5, 8)
- Dan Tyminski – backing vocals (6) (Note: Dan Tyminski appears courtesy of Rounder Records.)
- Bekka Bramlett – backing vocals (9)
- Bob Bailey – backing vocals (11, 12)
- Vicki Hampton – backing vocals (11, 12)

Production

- Dann Huff – producer
- Brady Barnett – recording
- Ben Fowler – recording
- Jed Hackett – recording
- Mark Hagen – recording
- Justin Niebank – mixing (1–5, 7–12)
- Jeff Balding – mixing (6, 13)
- David Bryant – recording assistant
- Todd Gunnerson – recording assistant
- Greg Lawrence – recording assistant
- Drew Bollman – mix assistant (1–5, 7–12)
- Scott Kidd – mix assistant (1–5, 7–12)
- Christopher Rowe – digital editing
- Adam Ayan – mastering at Gateway Mastering & DVD (Portland, Maine)
- Mike "Frog" Griffith – production coordinator
- Wendy Marvel – album design
- Frank W. Ockenfels III – photography
- Jillian Rubinger – wardrobe stylist
- Renato Campora – hair
- John Wright – make-up
- Mark Botting – career direction
- Scott Welch – career direction

== Charts ==
This Woman debuted at #3 on the Billboard 200 with over 101,000 copies sold in its 1st week, it fell to #25 with 40,000 copies sold in its 2nd week and #40 in its 3rd week with 37,000 copies sold. The album spent 3 weeks in top 50 and a total of 47 weeks in Billboard 200. It has received gold status and sold over 618,000 copies in United States as of June 2006 by Nielsen SoundScan.

=== Weekly charts ===
Chart (2005)	Peak position
Australian Albums Chart	90
Australian Top Country Albums	7
Japanese Oricon Albums Chart	218
US Billboard 200	3
US Top Country Albums (Billboard)	2

=== Year-end chart ===
Chart (2005)	Position
US Billboard 200	134
US Billboard Top Country Albums	21
Chart (2006)	Position
US Billboard Top Country Albums	56

=== Certifications ===
Region	Certification	Certified units/sales
United States (RIAA)	Gold	500,000^{^}
^{^} Shipments figures based on certification alone.
