= God's Work =

Studio album by LeAnn Rimes
- Released: September 16, 2022
- Recorded: 2020–2022
- Studios: The Village Recorder (Los Angeles, California); Capitol Studios (Hollywood, California); Blue 52 Studio (Sherman Oaks, California); The Lodge (New York City, New York); Camden Studios (Dublin, Ireland)
- Genres: Country; spiritual
- Length: 48:38
- Labels: EverLe; Thirty Tigers
- Producers: Darrell Brown; Aloe Blacc; LeAnn Rimes; Mark Batson

LeAnn Rimes chronology
Chant: The Human & the Holy (2020)	God's Work (2022)	Greatest Hits Christmas (2025)

Singles from god's work
- 1. "Throw My Arms Around the World" Released: December 16, 2020; 2. "How Much a Heart Can Hold" Released: April 8, 2022; 3. "The Only" Released: September 5, 2022; 4. "Spaceship" Released: September 27, 2022; 5. "Innocent" Released: September 1, 2023

God's Work (stylized in all lowercase) is the seventeenth studio album by American country-pop singer LeAnn Rimes, released on September 16, 2022. Rimes co-wrote all but two of the tracks.

Five singles were released in support of the album: "Throw My Arms Around the World", "How Much a Heart Can Hold", "The Only", "Spaceship", and "Innocent". "I Do", a collaboration with Aloe Blacc, was released as a single from his fifth studio album All Love Everything (2020) and included as the final track on God's Work.

== Background ==
The album title and tracks are all stylized in lowercase. Rimes stated the reason for this is "If we're arguing about why the 'g' is or isn't capitalized, we're missing the whole point. It's so important for us to focus on the messages, rather than the nuances."

=== Singles ===
Five singles were released to promote the album. The first, "Throw My Arms Around the World", was released in 2020. "How Much a Heart Can Hold" was released in 2022. Initially released as a promotional single on May 20, 2022, "The Only" impacted Italian radio on September 5, 2022. "Spaceship" was released on September 27, 2022, and peaked at number 65 on the UK Singles Downloads Chart. On September 1, 2023, "Innocent" was released as the fifth single from the album. "I Do", a collaboration with Aloe Blacc, was released as a single from his fifth studio album All Love Everything (2020) and included as the final track on God's Work.

Prior to the release of the album, two additionally promotional singles were issued. On July 15, 2022, Rimes released "The Wild". On August 18, 2022, "Awakening" was released as the album's final promotional single.

== Commercial performance ==
In the United Kingdom, "God's Work" appeared on a variety of different charts; the album peaked at number 43 on the UK Album Downloads Chart, number 69 on the UK Physical Albums Chart, number 5 on the Americana Albums Chart, number 25 on the UK Independent Albums Chart, and at number 5 on the UK Christian & Gospel Albums Chart.

== Critical reception ==
Professional ratings
Review scores
Source	Rating
AllMusic	3.5/5 stars
American Songwriter	3.5/5 stars

The album received three-and-a-half star reviews from both AllMusic and American Songwriter. Stephen Thomas Erlewine of AllMusic wrote that "The dramatic air is heartfelt and striking, albeit a little monochromatic: it's an album delivered in grayscale, the sober execution suiting the probing songs but sounding slightly stifling over the course of 12 tracks", while Alli Patton of American Songwriter wrote "Overall, the album is involved. From the opening track, god's work begins a journey of reflection and introspection, albeit slow, at times, but meditative all the same. For those willing to take that journey, god's work will not disappoint."

== Track listing ==
All tracks are written by LeAnn Rimes and Darrell Brown, except where noted.

God's Work track listing
No.	Title	Writer(s)	Length
1.	"Spaceship"		4:07
2.	"The Only" (featuring Ben Harper, Ledisi, and Ziggy Marley)		4:05
3.	"Awakening"		4:14
4.	"How Much a Heart Can Hold"	David Baerwald, Brown, Rimes	3:25
5.	"Throw My Arms Around the World"		5:18
6.	"The Wild" (featuring Mickey Guyton and Sheila E.)		4:13
7.	"Innocent"		3:48
8.	"God's Work" (featuring Mickey Guyton, Robert Randolph, and Tata Vega)	Mark Batson, Brown, Rimes	5:04
9.	"Something Better's Coming"		4:38
10.	"Imagined with Love"		2:32
11.	"There Will Be a Better Day"	Brown, Beth Neilsen Chapman	4:00
12.	"I Do" (duet with Aloe Blacc)	Blacc, Jon Levine, Sarah Solovay	3:10
Total length:			48:38

God's Work CD bonus track
No.	Title	Length
13.	"Throw My Arms Around the World" (Dave Audé remix)	3:59
Total length:		52:37

God's Work Resurrected bonus tracks
No.	Title	Length
13.	"Innocent" (featuring Orchid Quartet)	3:31
14.	"Imagined with Love" (featuring San Francisco Gay Men's Chorus, Sydney Gay & Lesbian Choir & New York City Gay Men's Chorus)	2:31
15.	"Spaceship" (Dave Audé Extended Remix)	5:49
16.	"Throw My Arms Around the World" (Dave Audé Extended Remix)	5:50
17.	"Spaceship" (Dave Audé Astral Plane Remix)	4:23
Total length:		70:42

Notes

- All track titles are stylized in all lowercase.

== Personnel ==
Musicians

- LeAnn Rimes – vocals, additional backing vocals (5, 8), acoustic piano (11)
- Darrell Brown – acoustic piano, keyboards
- Mark Batson – Hammond B3 organ
- Greg Hagan – guitars
- Dean Parks – guitars
- Ilya Toshinsky – guitars
- Waddy Wachtel – guitars
- Ben Harper – guitars (2), vocals (2)
- Josh Luxe – additional acoustic guitars (3)
- Robert Randolph – pedal steel guitar (5, 8)
- Stefan Lessard – bass (1, 2, 5–11)
- Jennifer Condos – bass (3, 4)
- Trevor Lawrence Jr. – drums (1–5, 7–11), percussion (1–5, 7–11)
- Sheila E. – guest drums and percussion (6)
- Taku Hirana – percussion (1–5, 7–11)
- Maro – additional percussion (5)
- Hadas Kleinman – cello (4)
- Chris Walden – string arrangements
- Ziggy Marley – guest vocals (2)
- Ledisi – guest vocals (2)
- Denise Green – additional backing vocals (5, 8)
- Tiffany Palmer – additional backing vocals (5, 8)
- Mickey Guyton – guest vocals and backing vocals (6, 8)
- Tata Vega – guest vocals (8)

Production

- Darrell Brown – producer
- LeAnn Rimes – producer
- Mark Batson – co-producer (8)
- Aloe Blacc – co-producer (12)
- Cindi Peters – production coordinator
- Norman Seeff – photography, cover design
- Hannah Maldon – art direction, booklet design
- Prodigy Entertainment – management

Technical credits

- Niko Bolas – recording
- Lynne Earls – recording
- Chandler Harrod – Pro Tools engineer
- Alisse Laymac – Pro Tools engineer, additional recording
- Ray Donghwan – additional recording
- Mychael Gabriel – additional recording
- Eric Liljestrand – additional recording
- Chris Allgood – mixing (1, 6), mastering
- Emily Lazar – mixing (1, 6), mastering
- Ruadrhi Cushnan – mixing (2, 3, 5, 7–11)
- Elise Mollé – mix assistant (2, 3, 5, 7–11)
- Jay Marcovitz – mixing (4)
- The Lodge – mastering location

== Release history ==
Release date and formats for God's Work
Region	Date	Format	Version	Label	Ref.
United States	September 16, 2022	CD; digital download; LP; streaming	Standard	EverLe	
United States	November 10, 2023	Digital download; streaming	Resurrected	EverLe	
