= Everybody's Someone =

Single by LeAnn Rimes featuring Brian McFadden

from the album Whatever We Wanna
- Released: September 25, 2006 (UK); January 4, 2007 (Australia)
- Recorded: 2006
- Genre: Pop, country
- Length: 3:39
- Label: Curb Records, Sony Music Australia
- Songwriter(s): Martin Sutton, Christopher Neil
- Producer(s): Dan Huff

LeAnn Rimes singles chronology
"Strong" (2006)	"Everybody's Someone" (2006)	"Some People" (2006)

Brian McFadden singles chronology
"Demons" (2005)	"Everybody's Someone" (2006)	"Like Only a Woman Can" (2007)

"Everybody's Someone" is the second single taken from American singer LeAnn Rimes' album Whatever We Wanna. The track features vocals from former Westlife singer Brian McFadden. The song peaked at #28 on the Irish Singles Chart and at #47 on the UK Singles Chart.

The song was covered by Cliff Richard and Olivia Newton-John and features on Richard's 2018 album Rise Up.

== Track listing ==
UK CD1

1. "Everybody's Someone" (Gateway Mix) – 3:42 (Martin Sutton, Chris Neil)
2. "Probably Wouldn't Be This Way" (Dan Huff Remix) – 3:40 (John Kennedy, Tammi Kidd)

UK CD2

1. "Everybody's Someone" (Gateway Mix) – 3:42 (Martin Sutton, Chris Neil)
2. "Nothing About Love Makes Sense" – 2:55 (Gary Burr, Joel Fenney, Kylie Sackley)
3. "And It Feels Like" (Hi Tack's It Feels Damn Good Remix) – 6:00 (Steve Robson, Thom Shuyler)
4. "Everybody's Someone" (Video)

== Chart performance ==
Chart (2006)	Peak position
Ireland (IRMA)	27
UK Singles (OCC)	48
