= And It Feels Like =

2006 single by LeAnn Rimes

Single by LeAnn Rimes

from the album Whatever We Wanna
- B-side: "Little More Time"
- Released: May 29, 2006
- Length: 3:47
- Label: Curb, London
- Songwriter(s): Steve Robson, Thom Schuyler, Sherena Dugani
- Producer(s): Dann Huff, Charlie Judge, Jeremy Wheatley

LeAnn Rimes singles chronology
"Something's Gotta Give" (2006)	"And It Feels Like" (2006)	"Strong" (2006)

Audio sample
- file; help

Music video
- "And It Feels Like" on YouTube

"And It Feels Like" is a song recorded by American country pop singer LeAnn Rimes. It was released as the lead single from her eighth studio album Whatever We Wanna on May 29, 2006. It was not released in the United States.

== Track listings ==
UK maxi-CD single

1. And It Feels Like - 3:48
2. And It Feels Like (Friday Night Posse Remix) - 7:52
3. I Need You (Graham Stack Radio Edit) - 3:42
- And It Feels Like (Video) - 3:46

UK CD single

1. And It Feels Like - 3:48
2. Little More Time - 3:16

UK digital download

1. And It Feels Like - 3:48
2. And It Feels Like (Friday Night Posse Remix) - 7:52
3. I Need You (Graham Stack Radio Edit) - 3:42

== Credits ==
Credits are adapted from the liner notes of Whatever We Wanna.

- Tom Bukovac - guitar
- Lisa Cochran - backing vocals
- Sherena Dugani - songwriter
- Dan Huff - guitar, producer
- Jay Joyce - guitar
- Charlie Judge - additional productions, keyboards & programming
- Chris McHughes - drums
- LeAnn Rimes - lead vocals
- Steve Robson - songwriter
- Thom Schuyler - songwriter
- Jimme Lee Sloas - bass
- Jeremy Wheatley - additional production & mix

== Charts ==
Chart (2006)	Peak position
Ireland (IRMA)	24
UK Singles (OCC)	22
