= What a Wonderful World (LeAnn Rimes album) =

Studio album by LeAnn Rimes
- Released: October 12, 2004
- Studio: Capitol Studios and Henson Recording Studios (Hollywood, California); 1023 Studio (North Hollywood, California); Westlake Audio (Los Angeles, California); Blue 52 Studios (Sherman Oaks, California); Can-Am Studios (Tarzana, California)
- Genre: Jazz; Christmas; country
- Length: 36:07
- Label: Asylum-Curb
- Producer: LeAnn Rimes Peter Amato Gregg Pagani

LeAnn Rimes chronology
| The Best of LeAnn Rimes (2004) | What a Wonderful World (2004) | This Woman (2005) |

Professional ratings
Review scores
| Source | Rating |
|---|---|
| Allmusic | 2.5/5 stars |

What a Wonderful World is a 2004 album by American country pop recording artist LeAnn Rimes. It is her eighth studio album and first Christmas album, consisting of jazz inspired holiday music. Rimes released four promotional singles from this album: "O Holy Night", "Rockin' Around the Christmas Tree", "Have Yourself a Merry Little Christmas", and "A Different Kind of Christmas". Rimes also co-wrote three tracks on this holiday album, one of which with her then husband Dean Sheremet. "Santa Baby" was released as a limited exclusive bonus track on the album at US Target stores. It was also released as an exclusive bonus track on the Australian, Japanese and UK versions of the album and was the fifth promotional single.

== Track listing ==
| No. | Title | Writer(s) | Length |
|---|---|---|---|
| 1. | "Rockin' Around the Christmas Tree" | Johnny Marks | 2:39 |
| 2. | "A Different Kind of Christmas" | Allan Rich, Jud J. Friedman, Rimes, Pete Amato | 3:40 |
| 3. | "White Christmas" | Irving Berlin | 4:29 |
| 4. | "All I Want for Christmas Is You" | Andy Stone, Troy W. Powers | 3:52 |
| 5. | "Have Yourself a Merry Little Christmas" | Hugh Martin, Ralph Blane | 4:00 |
| 6. | "What a Wonderful World" | Bob Thiele, George David Weiss | 2:58 |
| 7. | "The Christmas Song" | Mel Tormé, Robert Wells | 4:10 |
| 8. | "Just Love Me" | Dean Sheremet, Greg Pagani, Rimes, Pete Amato | 2:47 |
| 9. | "Miss You Like Christmas" | Dennis Matkosky, Rimes, Ty Lacy | 3:40 |
| 10. | "O Holy Night" | Placide Clappeau | 3:42 |
| Total length: | | | 36:07 |

Japanese bonus track
| No. | Title | Writer(s) | Length |
|---|---|---|---|
| 11. | "Santa Baby" | Joan Javits, Philip Springer, Tony Springer | 3:20 |
| Total length: | | | 39:27 |

Target Exclusive/UK track listing
| No. | Title | Writer(s) | Length |
|---|---|---|---|
| 1. | "Rockin' Around the Christmas Tree" | Johnny Marks | 2:39 |
| 2. | "A Different Kind of Christmas" | Allan Rich, Jud J. Friedman, Rimes, Pete Amato | 3:40 |
| 3. | "White Christmas" | Irving Berlin | 4:29 |
| 4. | "All I Want for Christmas Is You" | Andy Stone, Troy W. Powers | 3:52 |
| 5. | "Have Yourself a Merry Little Christmas" | Hugh Martin, Ralph Blane | 4:00 |
| 6. | "Santa Baby" | Joan Javits, Philip Springer, Tony Springer | 3:20 |
| 7. | "What a Wonderful World" | Bob Thiele, George David Weiss | 2:58 |
| 8. | "The Christmas Song" | Mel Tormé, Robert Wells | 4:10 |
| 9. | "Just Love Me" | Dean Sheremet, Greg Pagani, Rimes, Pete Amato | 2:47 |
| 10. | "Miss You Like Christmas" | Dennis Matkosky, Rimes, Ty Lacy | 3:40 |
| 11. | "O Holy Night" | Placide Clappeau | 3:42 |
| Total length: | | | 39:27 |

== Personnel ==
Credits taken from Target release track listing.

- LeAnn Rimes – vocals
- Cassandra O'Neal – acoustic piano (3, 5, 7, 8, 10, 11)
- Patrick Warren – synth bells (3), pump organ (11), synth strings (11)
- Robbie Nevil – guitars (1, 4)
- Michael Herring – acoustic guitar (2), acoustic guitar solo (11)
- Michael Thompson – electric guitar (2, 5, 10, 11), acoustic guitar (5), dobro (9), slide guitar (11)
- Dean Parks – acoustic guitar (5, 7, 10, 11)
- John Chiodini – electric guitar (3, 8)
- Chris Bruce – acoustic guitar (9)
- Marty Rifkin – pedal steel guitar (2)
- John Hatton – bass (1, 4, 6)
- Leland Sklar – electric bass (2, 11)
- Reggie Hamilton – upright bass (3, 5, 7–10)
- Bernie Dresel – drums (1, 4, 6)
- Sheila E. – percussion (2, 3, 5, 7, 8, 10, 11), drums (3, 5, 7, 8, 10, 11)
- Leon "Ndugu" Chancler – drums (9)
- Ray Herrmann – alto saxophone (1, 4, 6), big band arrangements (1, 4, 6)
- Matt Zebley – alto saxophone (1, 4, 6)
- John Roberts – baritone saxophone (1, 4, 6)
- Tim Misica – tenor saxophone (1, 4, 6)
- Jim Youngstrom – tenor saxophone (1, 4, 6)
- Dan Higgins – bass clarinet (7)
- Robbie Hioki – bass trombone (1, 4, 6)
- Alex "Crazy Legs" Henderson – trombone (1, 4, 6)
- George McMullen – trombone (1, 4, 6)
- Arturo Velasco – trombone (1, 4, 6)
- Steve Baxter – trombone (9)
- Willie Murillo – trumpet (1, 4, 6)
- Kevin Norton – trumpet (1, 4, 6)
- Kye Palmer – trumpet (1, 4, 6)
- Kevin Richardson – trumpet (1, 4, 6)
- Gayle Levant – harp (8)
- Dino Soldo – harmonica (9)

Strings (Tracks 3, 5, 7, 8 & 10)

- Patrick Warren – string arrangements
- Daniel Smith – cello (3, 5, 8)
- Rudy Stein – cello (3, 5, 7, 8, 10)
- Robert Becker – viola (3, 5, 7, 8, 10)
- Karie Prescott – viola (3, 5, 8)
- David Stenske – viola (3, 5, 8)
- Charlie Bisharat – violin (3, 5, 7, 8, 10)
- Darius Campo – violin (3, 5, 8)
- Mario DeLeon – violin (3, 5, 8)
- Joel Derouin – violin (3, 5, 7, 8, 10), concertmaster (3, 5, 7, 8, 10)
- Charles Everett – violin (3, 5, 8)
- Peter Kent – violin (3, 5, 8)
- Norman Hughes – violin (3, 5, 8)
- John Wittenberg – violin (3, 5, 8)

Los Angeles Master Chorale on "O Holy Night"

- Kevin St. Clair
- Greg Davies
- Claire Everett
- Amy Fogerson
- Greg Geiger
- Mike Geiger (also choir arrangements)
- Grant Gershon
- Stephen Grimm
- Marie Hodgson
- Drew Holt
- Elissa Jonston
- Charles Lane
- Robert Lewis
- Helene Quintana
- Kimberly Switzer

=== Production ===
- LeAnn Rimes – executive producer
- Peter Amato – producer, arrangements
- Gregg Pagani – producer, arrangements
- Jess Sutcliffe – recording
- Al Schmitt – mixing
- Wil Donovan – assistant engineer
- Steve Genewick – assistant engineer
- Brian Humphrey – assistant engineer
- Raymond McKinley – assistant engineer
- Cesar Ramirez – assistant engineer
- Travis Smith – assistant engineer
- Robert Hadley – mastering
- Doug Sax – mastering
- The Mastering Lab (Hollywood, California)
- Shari Sutcliffe – project coordinator, contractor
- Wendy Marvel – graphic design
- John Coulter Design – additional design
- James White – photography
- Jessica Paster – wardrobe stylist
- John Wright – make-up
- Danilo – hair
- Mark Botting – career direction
- Scott Welch – career direction

== Charts ==
| Chart (2004/07) | Peak position |
|---|---|
| US Billboard 200 | 81 |
| US Billboard Top Country Albums | 13 |
| US Billboard Top Holiday Albums | 3 |
