= Rimes: Live at Gruene Hall =

Live album by LeAnn Rimes
- Released: April 13, 2019
- Venue: Gruene Hall
- Genres: Country; gospel; pop rock
- Labels: EverLe; Thirty Tigers
- Producers: Niko Bolas; Darrell Brown; LeAnn Rimes

LeAnn Rimes chronology
It's Christmas, Eve (2018)	Rimes: Live at Gruene Hall (2019)	Chant: The Human & the Holy (2020)

Rimes: Live at Gruene Hall is a live album by American singer LeAnn Rimes. It was released on April 13, 2019 via EverLeRecords and Thirty Tigers. The project contained ten songs recorded at the Texas venue Gruene Hall. The songs incorporated various musical styles that showcased Rimes's influences over her career. The album was her first live record released in her career.

== Background, content and release ==
LeAnn Rimes left her recording contract with Curb Records in 2013 and released a series of independent albums over the next several years. In 2019, Rimes announced that she would release her first live album project. She recorded the album at Gruene Hall, a dance venue located in New Braunfels, Texas. It was produced by Rimes herself, along with Niko Bolas and long-time collaborator Darrell Brown. The record contained a total of ten tracks and featured various musical styles. The mix of genres was intentional to showcase Rimes's appreciation for all styles of music.

Live at Gruene Hall included Rimes's former hit songs "Blue" and "Nothin' Better to Do". It also included covers of country songs like "San Antonio Rose", "Always on My Mind" and "Streets of Bakersfield". Also featured was a cover of the pop rock song "Wonderwall" and the blue song "Pride and Joy". The disc was first released on April 13, 2019 on EverLeRecords in conjunction with the Thirty Tigers label. It was originally offered as a vinyl LP with five songs on each side of the record. It was also offered to digital markets, including Apple Music. "...with the response to the vinyl I am humbled by the fans for their positive feedback and make this a gift to everyone who couldn’t get the limited vinyl release," Rimes spoke in a press statement about the digital release.

== Track listing ==
Rimes: Live at Gruene Hall track listing
No.	Title	Writer(s)	Original artist(s)	Length
1.	"Pride and Joy"	Stevie Ray Vaughan	Stevie Ray Vaughan	3:44
2.	"Nothing Better to Do"	Darrell Brown; LeAnn Rimes; Dean Sheremet	LeAnn Rimes	4:44
3.	"Wasted Days and Wasted Nights"	Wayne Duncan; Freddy Fender; Huey Meaux	Freddy Fender	4:23
4.	"Streets of Bakersfield"	Homer Joy	Buck Owens; Dwight Yoakam	3:05
5.	"Wonderwall"	Noel Gallagher	Oasis	4:31
6.	"The Bottle Let Me Down"	Merle Haggard	Merle Haggard	3:37
7.	"Blue (Re-Imagined)"	Bill Mack	LeAnn Rimes	2:29
8.	"San Antonio Rose"	Bob Wills	Bob Wills	2:34
9.	"You Never Even Called Me by My Name"	Steve Goodman	David Allan Coe	5:38
10.	"Always on My Mind"	Wayne Carson; Mark James; Johnny Christopher	Brenda Lee; Willie Nelson	4:10

== Personnel ==
All credits are adapted from the liner notes of RIMES: Live at Gruene Hall.

Technical personnel

- Niko Bolas – mixing, producer
- Eric Boulanger – mastering
- Darrell Brown – producer
- Hannah Maldon – art direction
- LeAnn Rimes – producer

== Release history ==
Release history and formats for Rimes: Live at Gruene Hall
Region	Date	Format	Label	Ref.
North America	April 13, 2019	Digital download; streaming; vinyl	EverLe Records; Thirty Tigers	
