= Re-Imagined (EP) =

EP (re-recording) by LeAnn Rimes
- Released: June 20, 2018
- Genre: Country pop
- Labels: EverLe; Thirty Tigers
- Producers: Darrell Brown; LeAnn Rimes

LeAnn Rimes chronology
The Biggest Hits of LeAnn Rimes (2018)	Re-Imagined (2018)	It's Christmas, Eve (2018)

Re-Imagined is an extended play (EP) by American singer LeAnn Rimes. It was released on June 20, 2018 via Ever Le Records and Thirty Tigers and contained five tracks. The EP was Rimes's third released in her career and consisted of re-recordings of her most well-known songs.

== Background, content and release ==
LeAnn Rimes had been performing her most well-known hit songs for many years. However, she found that many listeners were asking for new versions of her songs because she has originally recorded the tracks as a teenager. "People are constantly asking for these versions of the songs, because they're grown-up versions. Now, everybody who grew up with these songs gets to relate to them the way I do. There's a wisdom behind [the music.]," she told The Boot. The project was produced by Rimes, along with her longtime musical collaborator, Darrell Brown.

Five tracks were featured on Re-Imagined, including a duet version with Stevie Nicks of the song "Borrowed". The song first appeared on her 2013 album Spitfire. Also featured on the record were new recordings of her former songs "Blue", "How Do I Live", "Can't Fight the Moonlight" and "One Way Ticket (Because I Can)". Four songs were issued as promotional singles from the EP project. Re-Imagined was released on EverLe Records and Thirty Tigers on June 20, 2018 to digital and streaming platforms.

== Track listing ==
Re-Imagined
No.	Title	Length
1.	"How Do I Live (Re-Imagined)"	4:18
2.	"One Way Ticket (Re-Imagined)"	4:16
3.	"Can't Fight the Moonlight (Re-Imagined)"	4:40
4.	"Blue (Re-Imagined)" (Live)	2:29
5.	"Borrowed (Re-Imagined)" (with Stevie Nicks)	3:32

== Release history ==
Release history and formats for Re-Imagined
Region	Date	Format	Label	Ref.
North America	June 20, 2018	Digital download; streaming	Ever Le Records; Thirty Tigers	
