= Chant: The Human & the Holy =

Studio album by LeAnn Rimes
- Released: November 20, 2020
- Genre: Chant; spiritual
- Label: EverLe; Thirty Tigers
- Producer: Darrell Brown; LeAnn Rimes

LeAnn Rimes chronology
Rimes: Live at Gruene Hall (2019)	Chant: The Human & the Holy (2020)	God's Work (2022)

Chant: The Human & the Holy (stylized as CHANT: The Human & the Holy) is the sixteenth studio album by American singer LeAnn Rimes. It was released on November 20, 2020, via EverLe Records and Thirty Tigers. Chant is a collection of chants and personal mantras that explored Rimes's personal journeys. The collection consisted of 12 tracks. all of which were co-written by Rimes herself. Two singles were released from the record.

== Background ==
After leaving her long-time record label in 2013, LeAnn Rimes issued a series of independent albums. The projects ranged from Christmas EPs to live albums. Among these releases was 2020's Chant: The Human & the Holy. The album's concept was derived from Rimes's mental health challenges, an issue she opened up about in 2012 after checking into a treatment center for anxiety and stress. "We gain so much wisdom after we’ve come through something...Why else are we put through something unless we can turn it around and utilize it?", she explained to Forbes. Rimes also explained that she thought releasing an album of chants would help "her fans to relieve the pandemic blues".

== Content and recording ==
Unlike her previous releases, Chant: The Human & the Holy was a collection of chants combined with Rimes's own singing voice. "I lead singalongs all the time and I thought I would really love to mix the chanting with my music and be able to teach it," she told Reuters. Rimes said she came up with the idea while practicing mediation. As she was meditating, she would feel melodies and words "rise up" and she would hit "record" on her smartphone to save it. The album contained a total of 12 tracks. All of the songs on the project were co-written by Rimes, along with long-time musical collaborator Darrell Brown. One of the tracks Rimes highlighted in an interview with Billboard was "Sing Love into the World". In an interview with the magazine, she commented, "The song is calling on me to put my love into action, and then it is asking the listener to do the same with their heart."

== Release and promotion ==
To promote the record, Rimes released the single "Sing Love into the World" on November 18, 2020. It was followed by "My Heart" on Thursday, November 19, 2020. A lyric video was also created to promote "Sing Love into the World". CHANT: The Human & the Holy was released on November 20, 2020, on EverLe Records and was distributed by the Thirty Tigers label. The album was offered to digital and streaming platforms including Apple Music.

== Track listing ==
All songs are written by Darrell Brown and LeAnn Rimes, except Tracks 3-6 written by LeAnn Rimes.

Chant: The Human & the Holy track listing
No.	Title	Length
1.	"My Heart"	3:14
2.	"Be Still and Know"	5:13
3.	"In the Stillness"	7:35
4.	"Treasured"	3:19
5.	"Human/Holy"	2:36
6.	"The Truth of Love"	3:02
7.	"What I Cannot Change" (Chant)	6:27
8.	"With My Hands"	4:12
9.	"Set Me Free"	7:11
10.	"Let the Light In"	4:21
11.	"Christed"	2:49
12.	"Sing Love into the World"	4:13

== Release history ==
Release history and formats for Chant: The Human & the Holy
Region	Date	Format	Label	Ref.
North America	November 20, 2020	Digital download; streaming	EverLeRecords; Thirty Tigers	
