= Some People (LeAnn Rimes song) =

Single by LeAnn Rimes

from the album This Woman
- Released: July 10, 2006
- Genre: Country
- Length: 3:56
- Label: Curb
- Songwriters: Darrell Brown; Joanna Cotten; Dennis Matkosky
- Producers: Dann Huff; LeAnn Rimes

LeAnn Rimes singles chronology
"Everybody's Someone" (2006)	"Some People" (2006)	"Nothin' Better to Do" (2007)

Music video
- "Some People" on YouTube

"Some People" is a song recorded by American country pop artist LeAnn Rimes, released as the fourth and final single from her album This Woman (2005). The single was released to radio stations on July 10, 2006. The song is written by Darrell Brown, Joanna Cotten and Dennis Matkosky. A music video was also released featuring Rimes and her ex-husband, Dean Sheremet, at a carnival. The song was also included on her international album, Whatever We Wanna (2006). The single peaked as high as 34 on the Hot Country Songs chart.

== Background ==
"Some People" was released to country radio stations in August 2006 as the final single from Rimes' album, This Woman. The song was included on her international album, Whatever We Wanna. The version on This Woman is more country oriented while on Whatever We Wanna it is more pop oriented and extended. A shorter radio remix of the song was also released. The music video includes a different version of the song than was heard on either album.

== Composition ==
"Some People" (2006)
A 30 second sample of LeAnn Rimes' "Some People", featuring the chorus.

"Some People" is a country ballad of three minutes and 56 seconds. The song is written by Darrell Brown, Joanna Cotten and Dennis Matkosky. It is written in the key of A-flat major with Rimes' vocals spanning between the octaves of E-flat _{3} and E-flat _{5}. The song talks about how sometimes people aren't lucky to find a love that can last through hard times or able to get so far into their relationship and how sometimes people give up and how the "hard times falls" and the thrill of the relationship is gone, it leaves the subject wondering in the "dust" of it. The song also speaks about how some won't find love or recognize it when it's in front of them and how everyone is at "the mercy of the will of love".

== Critical reception ==
A review on Billboard stated that the song "shows Rimes' maturity as an interpreter and as a premier vocalist," praising the song as "her best work in a long while."

== Music video ==
The music video for the song was released on August 25, 2006 and is directed by David McClister. The video features Rimes singing by herself at a carnival while clips of her and her then-husband, Dean Shermet, are seen on carnival rides, playing the games and winning a prize and seeing an old couple while thinking of themselves growing old together. The entire video is shown in sepia tone.

== Charts ==
Chart (2006)	Peak position
US Hot Country Songs (Billboard)	34

== Release history ==
Region	Date	Format(s)	Label(s)	Ref.
United States	July 10, 2006	Country radio	Curb	
