= Nothin' 'bout Love Makes Sense =

Single by LeAnn Rimes

from the album This Woman
- Released: August 30, 2004
- Genre: Country
- Length: 2:57
- Label: Asylum-Curb
- Songwriters: Gary Burr; Joel Feeney; Kylie Sackley
- Producers: Dann Huff; LeAnn Rimes

LeAnn Rimes singles chronology
| "Last Thing on My Mind" (2004) | "Nothin' 'bout Love Makes Sense" (2004) | "Probably Wouldn't Be This Way" (2005) |

Music video
- "Nothin' 'bout Love Makes Sense" on YouTube

"Nothin' 'bout Love Makes Sense" is a song by American country music artist LeAnn Rimes. The song was written by Gary Burr, Joel Feeney and Kylie Sackley, and produced by Rimes and Dann Huff. The song lyrically describes things in relationships that, to the narrator, don't make sense. Curb Records released the song on August 30, 2004 as the lead single from her seventh studio album This Woman (2005).

The song topped the Radio & Records Canada Country charts and peaked at number five on the US Hot Country Songs chart.

== Music video ==
A music video for "Nothin' 'bout Love Makes Sense" was released, with it being filmed by Kristin Barlowe. The video features Rimes walking in a forest, with other people doing things like skateboarding, playing with a radio, etc.

The music video premiered on Country Music Television and Great American Country on September 19, 2004.

== Chart performance ==
"Nothin' 'bout Love Makes Sense" debuted on the Billboard Hot Country Songs chart (then "Hot Country Singles & Tracks") the week of September 4, 2004 at number 57. The song then rose to number 44 the following week. The song entered the top-forty at number 35 on September 25, rising to number 30 the following week. The single slowly entered the top ten the week of December 11, 2004 at number ten, where it stayed for two weeks before falling to number eleven on December 25, 2004. On January 15, 2005, the song rose back again to the top ten at number nine. On February 12, 2005, "Nothin' 'bout Love Makes Sense" rose up to its peak position of number five, where it stayed for two consecutive weeks; the song was Rimes's first top five country hit in seven years, her last being "Commitment" in 1998. The song spent in total 28 weeks on the chart, tying with "Nothin' Better to Do" as her fourth longest running single on the chart.

"Nothin' 'bout Love Makes Sense" debuted on the Radio & Records Canada Country Top 30 chart the week of November 8, 2004, at number 30, the second highest debut of the week. The song rose to number 25 the week after. The song entered the top ten at number nine on November 19, 2004. The song topped the chart on December 17, 2004, giving LeAnn her first number one hit on Canada since her debut single "Blue" spent a single week at number one in 1996. The song would go one to spend three weeks at number one and overall 17 weeks in total.

== Charts ==
| Chart (2004–2005) | Peak Position |
|---|---|
| Canada Country (Radio & Records) | 1 |
| US Billboard Hot 100 | 52 |
| US Hot Country Songs (Billboard) | 5 |
| US Radio Songs (Billboard) | 44 |

=== Year-end charts ===
| Chart (2005) | Position |
|---|---|
| US Country Songs (Billboard) | 31 |

== Release history ==
Release dates and formats for "Nothin' 'bout Love Makes Sense"
| Region | Date | Format(s) | Label(s) | Ref. |
|---|---|---|---|---|
| United States | August 30, 2004 | Country radio | Asylum-Curb | |
