= Good Intentions (2010 film) =

- Directed by: Jim Issa
- Written by: Anthony Stephenson
- Produced by: Pamela Peacock; Richard Sampson
- Starring: Elaine Hendrix; Luke Perry; Jon Gries; LeAnn Rimes; Jimmi Simpson
- Distributed by: Phase 4 Films
- Release date: March 9, 2010
- Running time: 85 minutes
- Country: United States
- Language: English

Good Intentions is a 2010 American comedy film directed by Jim Issa. It is about Etta Milford (Elaine Hendrix), a Georgian housewife who creates a scheme to get back money for her family.

== Storyline ==
Etta Milford (Elaine Hendrix) is saddled with taking care of her rambunctious children in a poor Georgia town while her husband, Chester (Luke Perry), spends all their money on his makeshift inventions. Etta hatches a plan to get back money for her family. It includes holding up her own husband's liquor store, blackmailing the sheriff, and robbing the grocery store.

== Cast ==
- Elaine Hendrix as Etta Milford
- Luke Perry as Chester Milford
- Jon Gries as Sheriff Ernie
- Jimmi Simpson as Kyle
- LeAnn Rimes as Pam
- Gary Grubbs as Zachary
- Gregory Alan Williams as Buck
- Randy McDowell as Rob
- Jim Cody Williams as Bo
- Ted Manson as Mr. Simmons

== Filming ==
The film was shot on location in Decatur, Georgia, and Rutledge, Georgia.

== DVD release ==
The DVD was released by Phase 4 Films on March 9, 2010.
