= Reel Love (2011 film) =

2011 television film directed by Brian K. Roberts

- Written by: Sharon Weil
- Directed by: Brian K. Roberts
- Starring: LeAnn Rimes; Shawn Roberts; Christian Potenza; Burt Reynolds
- Music by: Carlos Lopes
- Country of origin: United States
- Original language: English

Production
- Executive producers: J. Clarke Gallivan; Ira Pincus; Coke Sams
- Producer: Kevin May
- Running time: 90 minutes
- Production company: Entertainment One Television

Original release
- Network: CMT
- Release: November 13, 2011

Reel Love is a 2011 American made-for-television romantic comedy film directed by Brian K. Roberts and starring LeAnn Rimes, Shawn Roberts, Christian Potenza and Burt Reynolds.

The film premiered on November 13, 2011, on CMT.

== Plot ==
Holly Whitman (Rimes), a successful big city lawyer returns to her small hometown in Alabama when her father Wade (Reynolds) is admitted to the hospital. Once there she goes on a soulful journey to reconnect with family and friends and finds romance along the way.

== Cast ==
- LeAnn Rimes as Holly Whitman
- Shawn Roberts as Jay Danville
- Christian Potenza as Everett Whitman
- Burt Reynolds as Wade Whitman
- Benjamin Ayres as Bobby Calgrove
- Mary Ashton as Mary Jo "MJ" Calgrove
- Jeff Roop as Carl Lindford
- Neil Crone as Tom Meyer
- Thomas Mitchell as Charlie Manfredi
- Tim Post as Bert Hay
- Naomi Snieckus as Charlene Hay
- Natalie Lisinska as Debbie Manfredi
- David Huband as Vern May
- Joe Bostick as Colin Nellburg
- Rebecca Kohler as Gayla Whitman
