= Probably Wouldn't Be This Way =

Single by LeAnn Rimes

from the album This Woman
- Released: March 21, 2005
- Genre: Country
- Length: 3:37
- Label: Curb
- Songwriters: John Kennedy; Tammi Kidd
- Producer: Dann Huff

LeAnn Rimes singles chronology
"Nothin' 'bout Love Makes Sense" (2005)	"Probably Wouldn't Be This Way" (2005)	"Something's Gotta Give" (2006)

Music video
- "Probably Wouldn't Be This Way" on YouTube

"Probably Wouldn't Be This Way" is a song recorded by American country music artist LeAnn Rimes. It was written by John Kennedy and Tammi Kidd and produced by Dann Huff. It was released on March 21, 2005, as the second single from Rimes's seventh studio album This Woman (2005).

It peaked at number 3 on the Hot Country Songs. It was also a crossover hit, peaking at number 8 on the Adult Contemporary chart. In Canada, it rose to number 19 on the country music chart and number 18 on the adult contemporary chart.

== Charts ==
Chart (2005–2006)	Peak position
Canada AC (Radio & Records)	18
Canada Country (Radio & Records)	19
US Billboard Hot 100	54
US Hot Country Songs (Billboard)	3
US Adult Contemporary (Billboard)	8

=== Year-end charts ===
Chart (2005)	Position
US Country Songs (Billboard)	26
Chart (2006)	Position
US Adult Contemporary (Billboard)	19

== Release history ==
Release dates and format(s) for "Probably Wouldn't Be This Way"
Region	Date	Format(s)	Label(s)	Ref.
United States	March 21, 2005	Country radio	Asylum-Curb	
United States	January 9, 2006	Adult contemporary radio	Asylum-Curb	
