= Robert Randolph =

Robert Randolph may refer to:

- Robert Randolph (musician), leader of funk and soul group Robert Randolph and the Family Band
- Robert Randolph (priest), medieval English priest
- Robert L. Randolph, American academic administrator

== See also ==
- Robert Randolph Bruce (1861–1942), lieutenant governor of British Columbia, Canada
- Robert R. Casey (Robert Randolph Casey, 1915–1986), American politician
- Sir Robert Garran (Robert Randolph Garran, 1867–1957), Australian lawyer and public servant
