= Martin Sutton =

British songwriter and musical coach

Martin Sutton (born 15 May 1960) is a British songwriter, record producer, mixer and songwriting coach and mentor living and working in Buckinghamshire. Sutton has written for many artists worldwide, including LeAnn Rimes, Celine Dion, Backstreet Boys, Olivia Newton-John, Gary Barlow, Pixie Lott, Duncan James, Mike Rutherford, and is a multi-instrumentalist and programmer. After 6 years with Universal Music Publishing Sutton started his own publishing company and recording studio. Since 2010 he has been active in the UK delivering songwriting workshops and masterclasses for PRS, Musician's Union and is Senior Songwriting Tutor at Tech Music School in London. He is a founder of The Songwriting Academy.
