= It's Christmas, Eve =

Soundtrack album by LeAnn Rimes
- Released: October 12, 2018
- Studio: Absolute Sound; Audacious; Surf Shack; Village Recorders
- Genre: Christmas; country
- Length: 28:59
- Label: EverLe; Thirty Tigers
- Producer: Dave Audé; Darrell Brown; LeAnn Rimes

LeAnn Rimes chronology
Re-Imagined (2018)	It's Christmas, Eve (2018)	Rimes: Live at Gruene Hall (2019)

It's Christmas, Eve is a soundtrack album by American singer LeAnn Rimes. It was released on October 12, 2018, via EverLeRecords and Thirty Tigers. The project was the soundtrack Rimes recorded for the 2018 Christmas television film It's Christmas, Eve. A total of nine songs comprised the album, including several original compositions penned by Rimes.

== Background and content ==
In 2018, LeAnn Rimes played the main role in a Hallmark Channel television film titled It's Christmas, Eve, as well as providing the sound track. Speaking with TV Insider, Rimes explained "...there's a zillion different ways to get music out in people's hands and their ears, and this is just a great way to be able to combine both film and music into one project."

The album consisted of nine tracks, five of which were composed by Rimes. She collaborated with producers Darrell Brown and Dave Audé on the songs. The title track was the first song she composed, beginning the writing process in February 2018. "It's a love song of hope, togetherness and a remembrance of what's most important in life, creating memories with the ones we love," she told Variety. Other original tracks were the songs "You and Me and Christmas" and "The Gift of Your Love". The soundtrack also includes Rimes's version of "White Christmas", "Carol of the Bells" and two medley holiday tracks. The album was recorded at three studios located in both Tennessee and California: Absolute Sound, Audacious, Surf Shack and Village Recorders.

== Release ==
It's Christmas, Eve was released on October 12, 2018, on EverLe Records in conjunction with the Thirty Tigers label. It was offered as both a compact disc and as a digital download. An 11-city holiday tour followed the album's release called the "You and Me and Christmas Tour". Rimes appeared on Fox's "New Years Eve Toast & Roast 2021" where she performed tracks from the project. In 2018, the soundtrack peaked at number five on the Billboard Top Independent Albums chart.

== Track listing ==
It's Christmas, Eve
No.	Title	Writer(s)	Length
1.	"You and Me and Christmas"	Darrell Brown; LeAnn Rimes	2:41
2.	"Joy" (The Jolly Mix) (God Rest Ye Merry Gentlemen/Angels We Have Heard on High/Hark the Herald Angels Sing)	Traditional	4:59
3.	"The Gift of Your Love"	Brown; Rimes	2:00
4.	"I Still Believe in Santa Claus" (North Pole Mix)	Brown; Rimes	2:34
5.	"Carol of the Bells" (Rung Out Mix)	Mykola Leontovych; Peter Wilhousky	3:26
6.	"It's Christmas, Eve"	Brown; Rimes	2:53
7.	"Christmas Jam on Snow" (Jingle Bell Rock/Here Comes Santa Claus/I Saw Mommy Kissing Santa Claus/Last Christmas)	Gene Autry; Joe Beal; Jim Boothe; Tommie Connor; Oakley Haldeman; George Michael	2:59
8.	"White Christmas"	Irving Berlin	3:43
9.	"Suite from It's Christmas, Eve"	Michael Plowman	3:44
Total length:			28:59

== Personnel ==
All credits are adapted from the liner notes of It's Christmas, Eve and AllMusic.

Musical personnel

- Dave Audé – Musician
- Darrell Brown – Musician
- Joe Cleveland – Musician
- Tim Davis – Background vocals
- Danny Dunlap – Musician
- Rob Dziubia – Musician
- Greg Hagan – Musician
- Tiffany Palmer – Background vocals
- LeAnn Rimes – Lead vocals, background vocals
- Jason Robinson – Musician
- Waddy Wachtel – Musician

Technical personnel

- Dave Audé – Arranger, engineer, mixing, producer
- Niko Bolas – Engineer
- Darrell Brown – Arranger, engineer, producer
- Danny Dunlap – Additional production
- Hannah Maldon – Artwork
- Kinga Nowicka – Artwork
- Cindi Peters – Production coordination
- Ryan Plummer – Photography
- LeAnn Rimes – Arranger, producer
- Jason Robinson – Additional production
- Matthew Vanleeuwen – Back cover photo
- Sam Willis – Mastering, mixing

== Charts ==
Chart (2018)	Peak position
US Independent Albums (Billboard)	5
US Top Holiday Albums (Billboard)	12

== Release history ==
Release history and formats for It's Christmas, Eve
Region	Date	Format	Label	Ref.
North America	October 12, 2018	Digital download; streaming; compact disc	EverLeRecords; Thirty Tigers	
