= Something's Gotta Give (LeAnn Rimes song) =

Single by LeAnn Rimes

from the album This Woman
- Released: December 12, 2005
- Recorded: 2004
- Genre: Country
- Length: 3:56
- Label: Asylum-Curb
- Songwriters: Craig Wiseman; Tony Mullins
- Producers: Dann Huff; LeAnn Rimes

LeAnn Rimes singles chronology
"Probably Wouldn't Be This Way" (2005)	"Something's Gotta Give" (2005)	"And It Feels Like" (2006)

Music video
- "Something's Gotta Give" on YouTube

"Something's Gotta Give" is a song recorded by American country music artist LeAnn Rimes. It was written by Craig Wiseman and Tony Mullins. Rimes produced the song with Dann Huff. The song was released on December 12, 2005 as the third single from her seventh studio album This Woman (2005) by Asylum-Curb Records.

"Something's Gotta Give" became a commercial success, peaking at number two on the Hot Country Songs chart, behind Kenny Chesney's "Summertime", which Wiseman co-wrote. It was also Rimes' highest-charting song at country radio since her sole number one hit "One Way Ticket (Because I Can)". The writers for the song, Craig Wiseman and Tony Mullins, won ASCAP awards in 2006.

== Content ==
"Something's Gotta Give" is an up-tempo song describing a female character named Jenny who is in her thirties, but unable to find a male companion who is suitable for her, after having failed several times. In the chorus, she says that "something's gotta give" for her to find the one that she wants.

== Music video ==
David McClister directed the video. The music video shows Rimes portraying every female role. She performs the song in different parts of a loft, and tries to find the perfect man. Every person that shows up at her door fails to impress her. As she is carrying a load of laundry, she bumps into one final guy, making her drop a bra. She gives him a happy smirk, and realizes he is the one she was looking for. He picks her bra up from the floor, and the two end up cuddling on the couch with a teddy bear he gave her.

== Chart performance ==
"Something's Gotta Give" debuted on the US Billboard Hot Country Songs the week of December 17, 2005, at number 55. "Something's Gotta Give" reached number two on the chart the week of June 17, 2006, where it stayed for one week behind "Summertime" by Kenny Chesney. It spent 30 weeks in total on the chart and is to date, Rimes's 12th and final top ten single to date.

== Charts ==
=== Weekly charts ===
Weekly chart performance for "Something's Gotta Give"
Chart (2005–2006)	Peak Position
Canada Country (Radio & Records)	2
US Country Top 50 (Radio & Records)	1
US Billboard Hot 100	51
US Hot Country Songs (Billboard)	2

=== Year-end charts ===
2006 year-end chart performance for "Something's Gotta Give"
Chart (2006)	Position
US Country Songs (Billboard)	16
US Country Aircheck (Mediabase)	13
