= Joanna Cotten =

American country music singer

- Origin: Memphis, Tennessee
- Genres: Country
- Occupation: Singer
- Years active: 2007–present
- Labels: Warner Bros. Records
- Website: Official website

Joanna Cotten (born in Memphis, Tennessee) is an American country music singer. Cotten's debut single, "The Prize," peaked at number 60 on the Billboard Hot Country Songs chart. Cotten recorded 21 songs for an unreleased album for Warner Bros. Records. She split from the label in December 2007 after the release of a digital-only extended play. Cotten has continued to record and tour. From 2013 to 2022, she was a member of Eric Church's band. Recently, she has rejoined the band for the 2025-2026 “Free The Machine” tour.

== Discography ==
=== Studio albums ===
Title	Details
Funkabilly	Release date: April 10, 2008; Label: self-released
Joanna Cotten	Release date: March 30, 2009; Label: self-released

=== Extended plays ===
Title	Details
Funkabilly	Release date: September 25, 2007; Label: Warner Bros. Records

=== Singles ===
Year	Single	Peak positions
Year	Single	US Country
2007	"The Prize"	60
