= LeAnn Rimes =

American singer (born 1982)

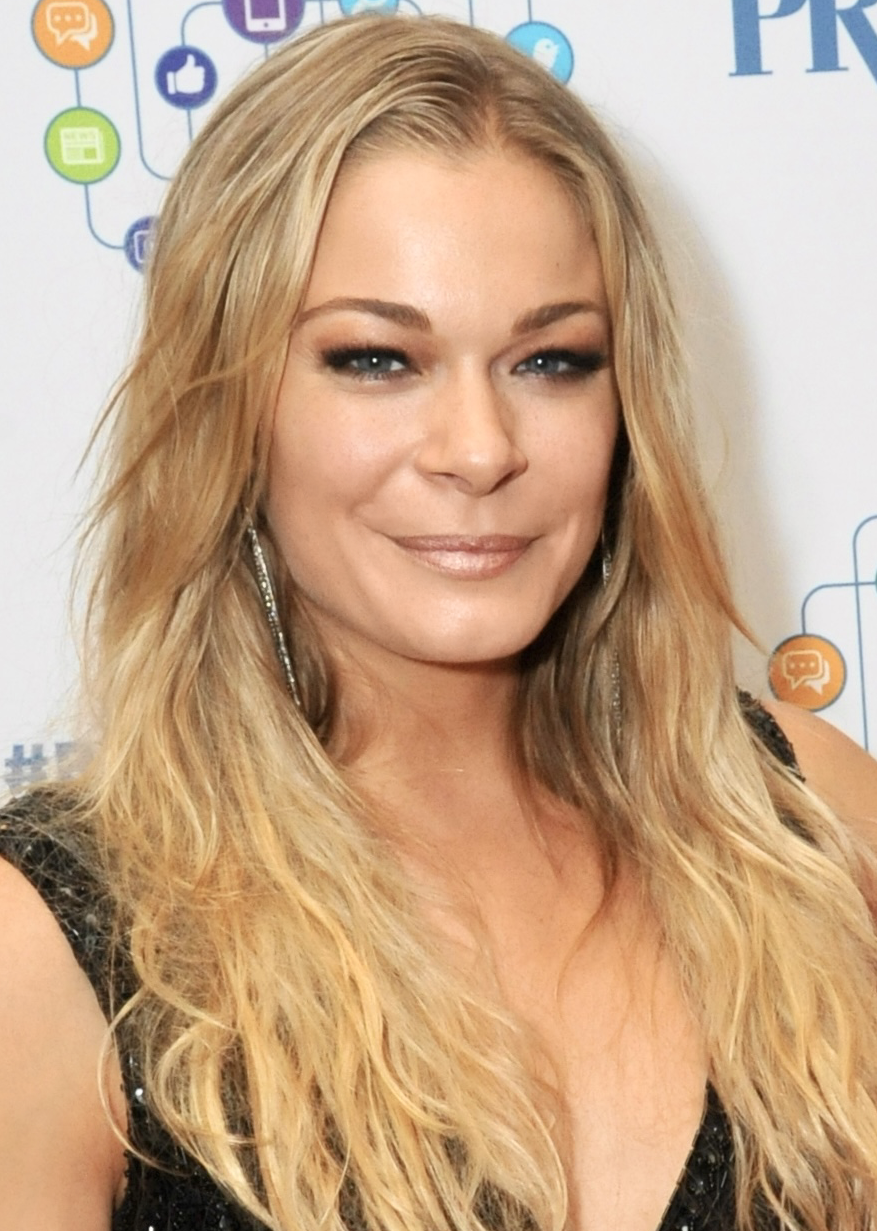
- Rimes in 2014
- Born: Margaret LeAnn Rimes; August 28, 1982 (age 44); Jackson, Mississippi, U.S.
- Spouses: Dean Sheremet (m. 2002; div. 2010) Eddie Cibrian (m. 2011)
- Musical career
- Origin: Garland, Texas, U.S.
- Genres: Country; pop; pop rock; dance-pop; adult contemporary; CCM
- Occupations: Singer; songwriter; actress; author
- Years active: 1990–present
- Labels: Curb; Iconic; Prodigy; RCA; EverLe; Thirty Tigers
- Website: leannrimes.com

Margaret LeAnn Rimes Cibrian (née Rimes, born August 28, 1982) is an American singer, songwriter and actress. She originally rose to success as a country music artist at the age of 13 and has since crossed over into pop, contemporary Christian, and other musical genres. Rimes has placed more than 40 singles on international charts since 1996. She has sold more than 48 million records worldwide, with 20.8 million album sales in the United States, according to Nielsen SoundScan. Billboard ranked her at number 17 in terms of sales success in the 1990–1999 decade.

Born in Mississippi and raised in Texas, Rimes demonstrated a unique singing ability from a young age. Through her parents' efforts, Rimes began performing in various musical theater and local music contests. Working with her father Wilbur as producer and manager, Rimes released two independent albums as a preteen. After signing with Curb Records in 1996, she released the single "Blue", which became a top-10 hit on the American Billboard Hot Country Songs charts. Her first Curb album and third overall, Blue was certified Platinum six times and established her as a major country artist. She received the Grammy Award for Best New Artist and Best Female Country Vocal Performance, becoming the youngest winner of these categories. In 1997, Rimes crossed over into pop music with "How Do I Live", which became one of the best-selling singles of the 1990s. The track was included on her next album You Light Up My Life: Inspirational Songs (1997), which was certified quadruple Platinum. It was followed up with the Platinum-certified albums Sittin' on Top of the World (1998) and LeAnn Rimes (1999). In the following years, Rimes released several pop singles for soundtrack albums, which include "I Need You" and "Can't Fight the Moonlight", the latter of which became a major hit worldwide. Several of these soundtrack singles were compiled on the Platinum-certified album I Need You (2001).

Breaking away from her father's management in the 2000s, Rimes released the Gold-certified pop album Twisted Angel (2002) and the Christmas record What a Wonderful World (2004). She returned to her country origins with This Woman (2005), which produced three country hits and was certified Gold. Later album releases were Whatever We Wanna (2006), Family (2007), Lady & Gentlemen (2011) and Spitfire (2013). After ending her long-time professional relationship with Curb Records, Rimes released the Christmas album Today Is Christmas (2015) and pop studio album Remnants (2016), the latter of which featured two number one Billboard dance club hits. In the years that followed, she released the albums Chant: The Human & the Holy (2020) and God's Work (2022).

Rimes has also had several notable television film roles. She began her acting career with the film Holiday in Your Heart (1997). After appearing in the television film Northern Lights (2009), Rimes began an affair with co-star Eddie Cibrian which received notable media attention. She has since appeared in Good Intentions (2010), Reel Love (2011), and It's Christmas, Eve (2018). In 2024, she was featured as a coach on The Voice Australia and The Voice UK. In 2025, Rimes was cast as Dixie Bennings on 9-1-1: Nashville.

== Early life ==
Margaret LeAnn Rimes was born on August 28, 1982, in Jackson, Mississippi. She is the only child of Wilbur Rimes and Belinda Butler. The family moved to Garland, Texas, when she was six. She was enrolled in vocal and dance classes, and she has performed at local talent shows at the age of five. Rimes began her career in musical theatre, performing in a Dallas, Texas, production of A Christmas Carol, and almost landing the lead part in the Broadway production of Annie. After appearing as a one-week champion on the television competition show Star Search, Rimes chose to pursue a career in country music. Rimes appeared a number of times on Johnnie High's Country Music Revue in Arlington, Texas, which gained the attention of local talent scouts.

By age nine, Rimes was an experienced singer. She toured nationally with her father and also regularly performed a cappella renditions of "The Star-Spangled Banner" at the opening of the Dallas Cowboys football games. In 1991, she released her debut album Everybody's Sweetheart on an independent label called Nor Va Jak. Due to the independent album's success throughout the Dallas music community, Rimes was discovered by local disc jockey and record promoter Bill Mack. Mack was impressed by Rimes's vocal ability, and over the next three years, he made various attempts to sign Rimes to a major country music label. The center of Mack's plan to bring her success was his 1958 single, "Blue". In July 1994, Rimes included her first version of "Blue" on her second and final Nor Va Jak release, All That; she also co-wrote "Share My Love" for this album. Mack then arranged a recording contract for Rimes with Curb Records. She signed with the Nashville label in 1996.

== Career ==
=== 1996: Country music breakthrough with Blue ===
"Blue"
In 1996 and at age 13, Rimes had her breakthrough song on the country charts with "Blue". The song won multiple awards and drew comparisons to the music of Patsy Cline.

After signing with Curb, Rimes recorded a new version of "Blue" as a single. Rimes stated that the version of 'Blue' that reached number 10 on the Billboard Hot Country Songs chart was a recording she had made at age 11. Critics drew comparisons between Rimes and that of Patsy Cline, to whom the song had been pitched in 1963; Mack claimed that Cline was unable to record the song before her death. A press release for the song said that Mack had been "waiting over 30 years to find the right vocalist to sing it". The song had previously been recorded by multiple artists over the years. Nonetheless, the media attention to "Blue" further added to the belief that Rimes was the successor to Cline's legacy.

Rimes's first Curb album and third overall, Blue was released in 1996. The disc sold 123,000 copies in its first week. On Blue, Rimes co-wrote "Talk to Me" with Ron Grimes and Jon Rutherford. The album peaked at number one on Billboard's Top Country Albums and debuted at number three on the Billboard 200 albums chart. In March 1999, Blue was certified six times Platinum by the Recording Industry Association of America (RIAA) In Canada, the album was certified triple Platinum by the Canadian Recording Industry Association (now Music Canada), a certification which, at the time, honored shipments of 300,000 copies in that country. (Note: In May 2008, Music Canada reduced the qualification for triple-platinum sales from 300,000 to 240,000.) As of 2009, it has sold over eight million copies worldwide. Shawn Haney of AllMusic considered the album to be "delightful" and that it could "help inspire other young teens". Two additional singles from the album made the top 40 on the Billboard country singles chart: "One Way Ticket (Because I Can)", which represented her highest peak on that chart at number one, and its follow-up "The Light in Your Eyes", which peaked at number five. "Blue" and "One Way Ticket (Because I Can)" both made top 10 on RPM Country Tracks, then the main country music chart published in Canada, with "Blue" being her most successful single there. (Note: RPM ceased publication in November 2000.)

Blue's commercial success led to the first of several industry award nominations for Rimes. The title track earned Rimes her first Grammy Award at the 39th Annual Grammy Awards in 1997, in the category of Best New Artist and Best Female Country Vocal Performance; she became the youngest person to win these awards. That year, the Country Music Association also awarded Rimes the Horizon Award, making her the youngest person ever to be nominated and win a Country Music Association award. The Academy of Country Music also awarded her Top New Female Vocalist, Song of the Year, and Single Record of the Year in 1996; she would be nominated for the latter two again in 1997.

=== 1997–1999: You Light Up My Life, Sittin' on Top of the World, and LeAnn Rimes ===
"How Do I Live"
In 1997, Rimes recorded "How Do I Live", which became one of the most commercially successful songs of the 1990s.

By 1997, Rimes's parents divorced. In February 1997, Curb released Unchained Melody: The Early Years, a reissue of the previously independently released All That (1994). It was named after Rimes's cover of Alex North and Hy Zaret's 1955 standard "Unchained Melody", which was a number 3 Billboard country hit that March. Unchained Melody topped the Billboard 200 and was certified double Platinum by the RIAA. Three months later, Rimes appeared on a live television special, recorded at Walt Disney World in Orlando, for Disney Channel in Concert. Curb released Rimes's next album You Light Up My Life: Inspirational Songs that September. It was a departure from Rimes's previous releases with more Adult Contemporary-styled music than country. The album was preceded by the single "How Do I Live", which became a major pop hit on the Billboard Hot 100, reaching number two. "How Do I Live" set a new record for becoming the longest-running single in Billboard Hot 100 history, spending 69 weeks on the chart. The song was ranked as the most successful song of the 1990s by Billboard magazine. The song also saw success in the United Kingdom, where it peaked at number seven and was certified Platinum. A cover of Joseph Brooks's "You Light Up My Life" was released as the album's second single; the song peaked at number 34 on the Billboard Hot 100 and was certified Gold. You Light Up My Life topped the Billboard 200 and was certified quadruple Platinum by the RIAA the following year for shipments of four million copies.

Rimes made her acting debut on the ABC television film Holiday in Your Heart, which premiered on December 14. The film was based on Rimes's titular book, which was released two months earlier. The film was the start of a three-movie contract that Rimes was offered by ABC in 1998. The film was semi-autobiographical, with Rimes playing a country performer who discovers that her grandmother becomes hospitalized. In the film, Rimes performed several of her hit songs. In 1998, she played a teen runaway in an episode of NBC's Days of Our Lives.

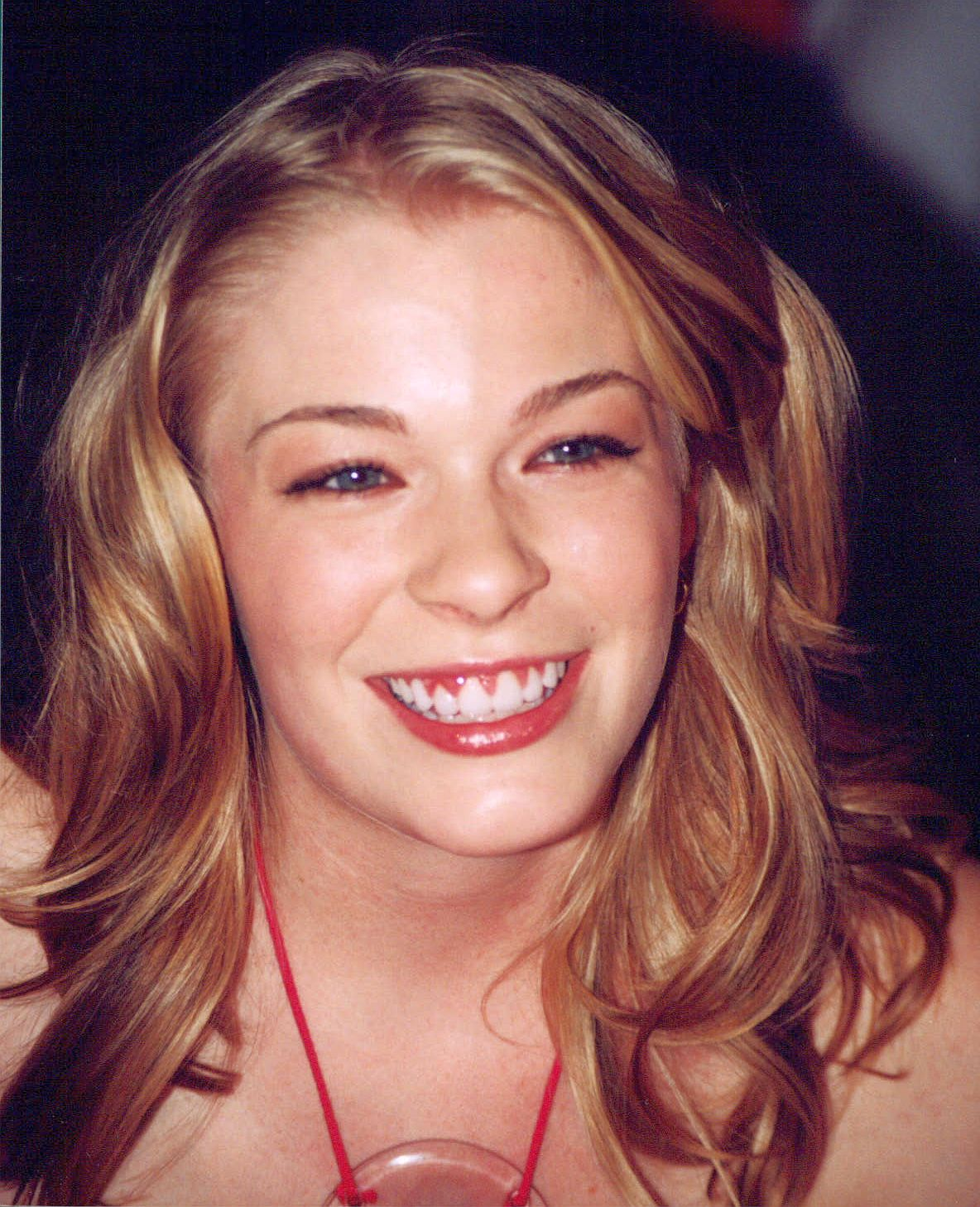
Rimes in 1999

Rimes's next Curb release was 1998's Sittin' on Top of the World. The album was given mixed reviews. James Hunter of Rolling Stone stated that Rimes "holds her own in the more popular style of Mariah Carey and Celine Dion, wherein a spectacular voice upstages a song, grins and goes on about her business." Sittin' on Top of the World debuted at number two on the Top Country Albums chart and at number three on the Billboard 200. The project spawned the number four Billboard country hit "Commitment", the Top 20 Pop hit "Looking Through Your Eyes" from the soundtrack of the 1998 film Quest for Camelot, and the number 10 country hit "Nothin' New Under the Moon". In July, the album was certified Platinum by the RIAA for shipments of one million copies.

In April 13, 1999, Faith Hill and LeAnn Rimes at the VH1 Divas 1999.

In October 1999, Curb released Rimes's sixth studio album, LeAnn Rimes, which she co-produced with Wilbur. The record was a collection of country music cover songs mainly by Patsy Cline. The album received mostly positive reviews. Stephen Thomas Erlewine called the album one of her "better" efforts. Beth Johnson of Entertainment Weekly gave the album a positive review and said that Rimes's voice "dares listeners to take note of what is missing in her interpretations—the gutsiness and gut-wrenching urgency of performers who felt what they sang." The album debuted at number one on the Top Country Albums chart, topping the country albums chart for two weeks. It also peaked at number eight on the Billboard 200 albums chart. The album sold over one million copies in the United States, and was certified Platinum by the RIAA. The project also included the new song "Big Deal". Released as the lead single, "Big Deal" peaked at number six on the country singles charts. Also in 1999, Rimes collaborated with Elton John on "Written in the Stars" for the stage musical Aida.

=== 2000–2004: I Need You and Twisted Angel ===
In 2000, Rimes contributed "I Need You" to the soundtrack for the 1999 TV movie Jesus. The song was issued as the lead single from the soundtrack in July 2000 in both pop and country versions. The song reached number eight on the Billboard country songs chart and number 11 on the Hot 100. Rimes appeared in the 2000 film Coyote Ugly and contributed four songs to its soundtrack; Rimes sang for Piper Perabo's character Violet Sanford in the film. In August, "Can't Fight the Moonlight" was released as a single from the film's soundtrack. The song 'Can't Fight the Moonlight' represented a shift toward pop music for Rimes. The single reached the top 10 on charts in multiple countries. In the United States, it reached number 11 on the Hot 100 and was certified Platinum, while in the United Kingdom, the song topped the charts and was certified double Platinum. In Australia, the song was the biggest-selling single of 2001, where it peaked at number 1 for six weeks, topped the year-end chart, and was certified triple Platinum. In total, the song received Platinum certifications from six countries and Gold certifications from a further three. "Can't Fight the Moonlight" won Rimes a Blockbuster Entertainment Award for "Favorite Song from a Movie".

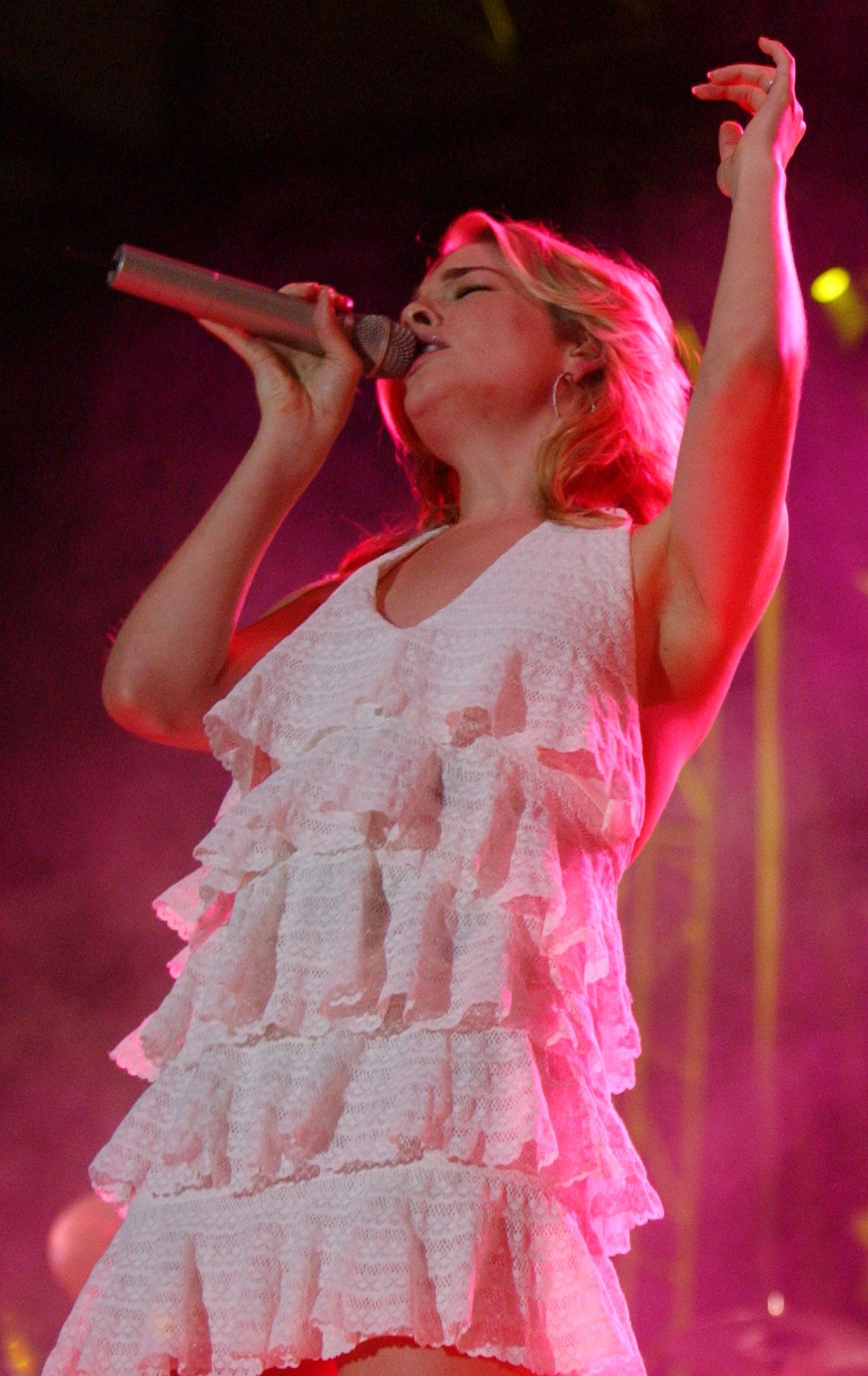
Rimes performing in September 2004

In November 2000, Rimes sued Curb to nullify her recording contract with the label; it had originally been signed on her behalf by her parents five years earlier. In January 2001, Curb released the compilation I Need You, which consists of four previously released soundtrack appearances alongside six new tracks. Rimes publicly disowned the album; she said that it was compiled from studio outtakes and released without her knowledge or input. Despite her comments, Curb continued to promote the record and released three singles in support of the album. The first of these releases was "But I Do Love You", which had previously appeared on the Coyote Ugly soundtrack and was remixed in a country style for inclusion on I Need You. This version peaked at number 20 on the country songs chart. I Need You generally featured more pop-oriented songs than her previous releases, being described by Stephen Erlewine as "her first full-fledged pop album" with "footing squarely within adult contemporary pop". Chris Neal from Country Weekly praised the album and Rimes's vocal performance, saying that "all the songs are solid". However, he also noted that "most of the songs have only a tenuous connection to country" and said "how you feel about I Need You will largely depend on whether you see LeAnn’s shift toward pop as a positive development." In November 2001, Rimes was released from her original contract with Curb and subsequently signed a new agreement with the label under new terms. I Need You was reissued with additional tracks on March 23, 2002. The album was certified Platinum by the RIAA.

On October 1, 2002, Rimes released her seventh studio album Twisted Angel. The album was mainly produced by Desmond Child and was a drastic departure from her previous studio albums, containing a combination of dance-pop and adult contemporary with more adult material. The album was preceded by the single "Life Goes On", which experienced success internationally but failed to chart on the Billboard Hot 100 in the United States. The single was particularly successful in Australia, where it peaked at number seven and was certified Platinum. The second single released from the album was "Tic Toc", which became her first top-10 hit on the Billboard Dance Club Songs chart. Rimes received criticism from critics and fans alike for her decision to release a pop album. She explained: "I've gotten grilled a lot about that album. You know, people just didn't want me to experiment. When you're a teenager growing up, you learn a lot about yourself, and that's what I did with my music. I did something different, something that not a lot of people expected me to do. [...] And, in a lot of ways, that did work for me. It was a great learning experience. So, nope, no regrets whatsoever." Twisted Angel was certified Gold by the RIAA.

In July 2003, Rimes released her first children's book, titled Jag. In November, Rimes released her Greatest Hits compilation in North America; its international counterpart The Best of LeAnn Rimes was released in February 2004. Both compilations included a collaboration with Irish singer Ronan Keating on "Last Thing on My Mind", which was released as a single that May. The song was most successful in the United Kingdom, where it peaked at numbers 4 and 5 on the Scottish and UK singles charts, respectively. In October 2004, Rimes released her first Christmas album and eighth studio album What a Wonderful World.

=== 2005–2013: This Woman, further album releases, and film roles ===
"Something's Gotta Give"
In 2005, Rimes released This Woman, which produced the country hit "Something's Gotta Give".

In January 2005, Rimes's ninth studio album This Woman was released. The album was a return to her country origins. "It's mainly a Country album, but it's my kind of Country music," she told the Voice of America. The album reached the top five of both the Billboard Country Albums chart and the Billboard 200. The album spawned the singles "Nothin' 'Bout Love Makes Sense", "Probably Wouldn't Be This Way", and "Something's Gotta Give", all of which reached the top five of the Billboard country songs chart. In 2005, Rimes became the host of the USA Network talent competition Nashville Star. A vocal chord illness prevented her from appearing in two episodes. In summer 2006, Rimes released the studio album Whatever We Wanna. The album arrived when This Woman and its singles were experiencing a resurgence in sales in the United States. As a result, the release of Whatever We Wanna in the states was delayed and later canceled; the album was only released overseas. In the United Kingdom, the album reached number 15. In 2006, Rimes performed the theme song to the Holly Hobbie & Friends series of animated specials and guest starred in the series' Christmas episode.

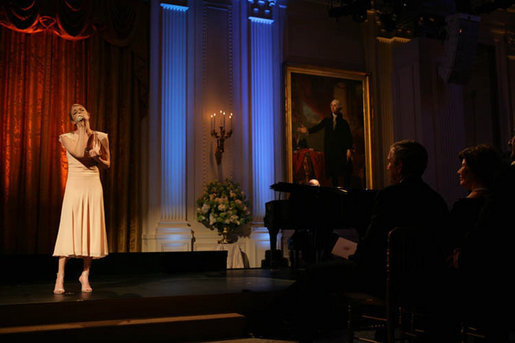
Rimes performing in the East Room of the White House before President George W. Bush and Laura Bush, 2006

In October 2007, Asylum-Curb issued Rimes's eleventh studio album Family. Every track on the album features writing credits from Rimes. Allmusic said that it "illustrates her range as a singer along with some true strength as a writer." The project's lead single "Nothin' Better to Do" reached the top 20 of the Billboard country songs chart while the second single, "Good Friend and a Glass of Wine", reached the top 40. In the fall of 2007, Rimes appeared with Joss Stone for an episode of Crossroads that aired on CMT. In 2008, Rimes joined Kenny Chesney on his Poets and Pirates Tour. In February 2009, the third single from Family, "What I Cannot Change", became the first country song to top the Billboard dance charts.

In 2009, Rimes played the role of Meg Galloway in the made-for-television film Northern Lights which aired on the Lifetime network. The film was based on Nora Roberts's 2004 book Northern Lights. Eddie Cibrian played opposite Rimes as her character's love interest. Media publicity of their real-life affair helped make Northern Lights the network's most-watched television movie, with four and a half million viewers in March 2009. On April 14, 2009, Rimes published the collaborative self-help book What I Cannot Change with Darrell Brown. In 2010, Rimes played a supporting role in the movie Good Intentions and contributed to the film's soundtrack.

In 2011, Rimes released her twelfth studio album Lady & Gentlemen. Rimes co-produced it along with country singer Vince Gill. The album contained covers of country songs originally recorded by male artists that Rimes re-recorded from a female perspective. Entertainment Weekly's Mikael Wood concluded that "The result is predictably solid, though it rarely sheds new light on the top-shelf material." The album's cover of John Anderson's "Swingin'" was nominated for a Grammy award. Lady & Gentlemen also featured two tracks which were original recordings: "Crazy Women" and "Give". Both tracks were released as singles and were minor hits on the Billboard country chart. The same year, Rimes starred in the television film Reel Love. The film aired on Country Music Television and also starred actor Burt Reynolds. She also had a guest role on the television show Drop Dead Diva.

Rimes's final album with Curb, Spitfire, was released in 2013. On this project, she co-produced with keyboardist Darrell Brown and co-wrote nine of its 13 songs. Spitfire centered around Rimes's affair with future husband Eddie Cibrian and the media speculation around their relationship. "I used to get mad at the tabloids, but I should be thanking them because they helped me write this whole record," she commented. The album sold 10,798 copies in its first week and debuted at number 36 on the Billboard 200. It also debuted at number nine on the country albums chart. Sales of the album were considered "disappointing" by several news outlets, while singles released from the album failed to become commercially successful. Also in 2013, she made a guest appearance on the FX television show Anger Management.

=== 2014–present: Later work and The Masked Singer ===
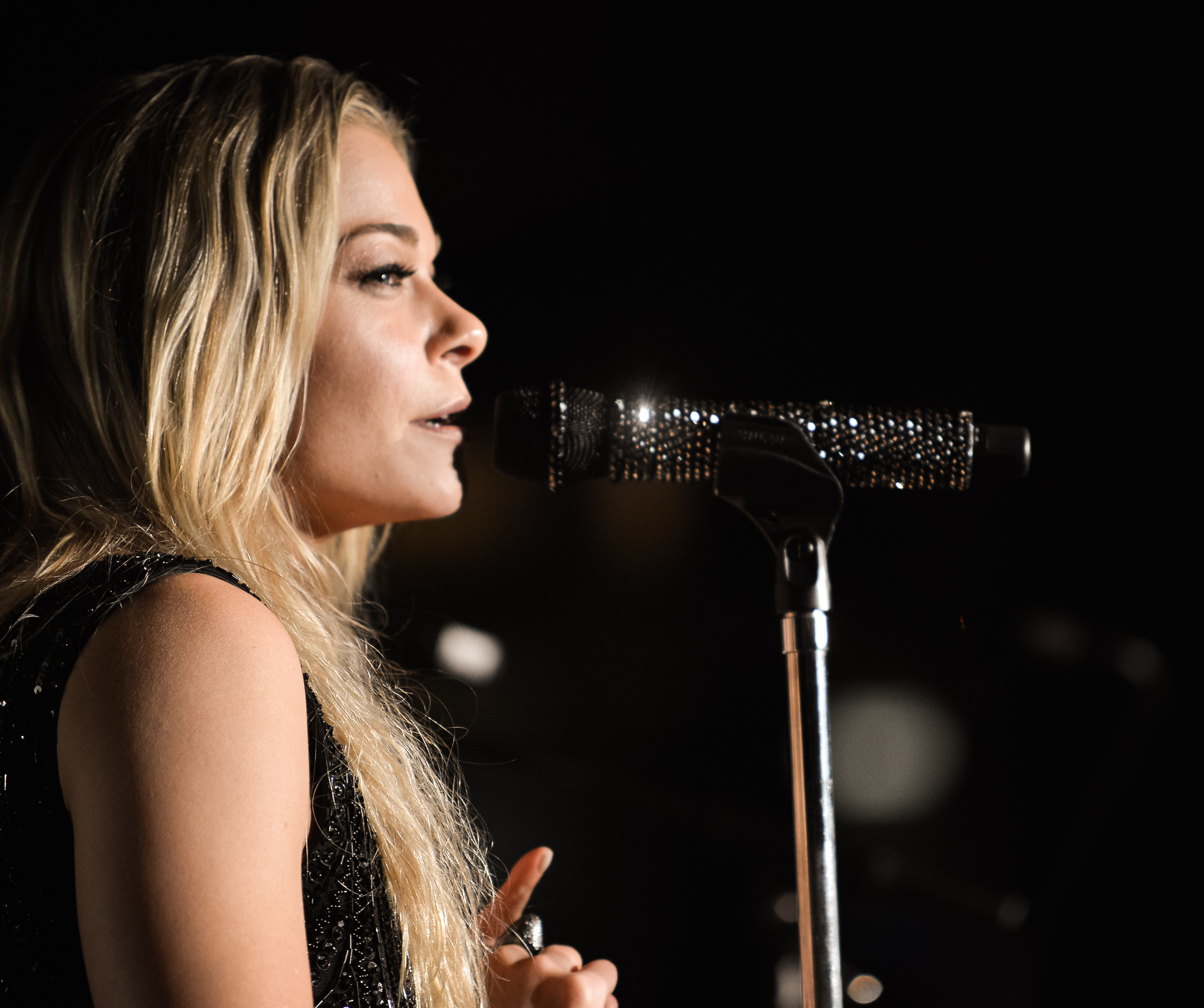
Rimes at the 2014 Big Apple Awards

In 2014, Rimes starred in the reality television series LeAnn & Eddie alongside Eddie Cibrian. The program aired on the VH1 network. The intention of the reality show was to "help clear the air" about their romantic relationship. "This show gave us an opportunity to take back our lives in a way and show a different side of us than what people really believe," Rimes commented. After one season, the show was cancelled by VH1.

In July 2014, Rimes announced that she would release three Christmas extended plays over the course of the next three years. In October 2014, the first of these planned EPs was released, One Christmas: Chapter 1, issued through Iconic Entertainment. It included the lead single, a cover of Gayla Peevey's "I Want a Hippopotamus for Christmas". The EP peaked at number 20 on the Top Country Albums chart and number 35 on the Top Holiday Albums list. To promote the project, Rimes embarked on the "One Christmas Tour", which toured the United States in the winter of 2014. Rimes's original plan of multiple EP releases was dropped and replaced with a full-length holiday album in 2015. That year she released Today Is Christmas through Prodigy Entertainment. A collaboration with singer Gavin DeGraw on a cover of Kenny Loggins's "Celebrate Me Home" was included. The record reached number two on the Holiday albums chart and number nine on the Country Albums chart.

In 2016, Rimes signed with RCA UK, an imprint of Sony Music Entertainment, and released a cover of Brandi Carlile's "The Story". It was included on her fifteenth studio album titled Remnants. First issued in the United Kingdom in 2016, Remnants was later released in the United States in February 2017. The album reached number 15 on the UK Albums Chart and number 88 on the Billboard 200. The album spawned the singles "Long Live Love" and "Love Is Love Is Love" which topped the Billboard Dance Club Songs chart; "Love Line" was released as the album's final single and peaked at number 5. In 2017, Rimes made a cameo appearance in the film Logan Lucky where she sang "America the Beautiful".

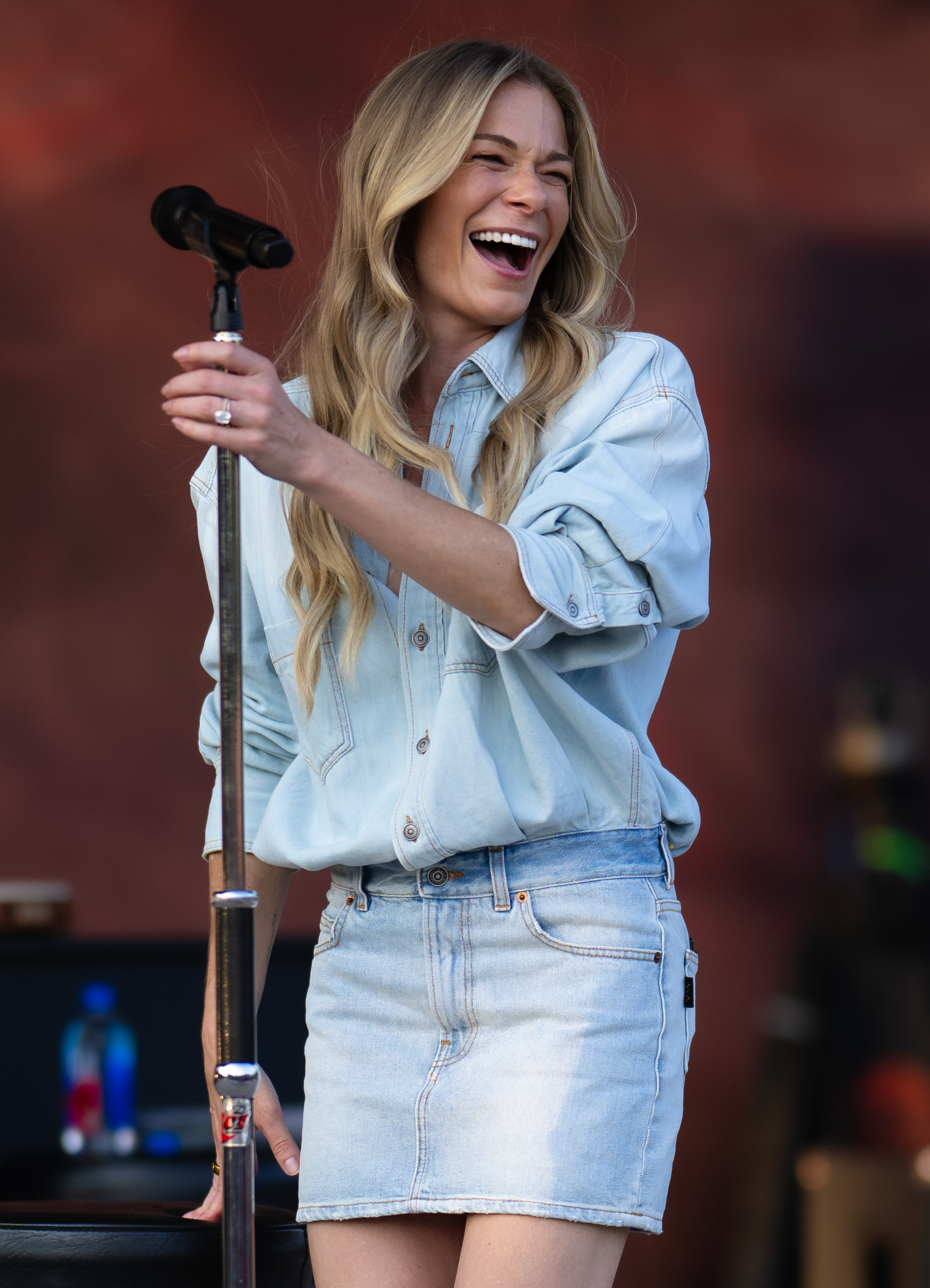
Rimes performing in July 2024

In June 2018, Rimes released Re-Imagined through EverLe Records and the Thirty Tigers label. The EP contains five tracks from her back catalogue that she re-recorded. Also included was a collaboration with former Fleetwood Mac lead singer Stevie Nicks on a re-recording of "Borrowed". Later in 2018, Rimes appeared in the Hallmark original television film titled It's Christmas, Eve. She recorded the film's soundtrack, which was released in October 2018. Included were covers of Christmas standards, as well as new recordings composed with producer Darrell Brown. In 2019, Rimes released her first live album, Rimes: Live at Gruene Hall.

In 2020, Rimes competed as "Sun" on the fourth season of the Fox reality singing competition The Masked Singer. Her identity was revealed during the season finale on December 16, 2020, where she was declared the winner of the season. She was later a guest panelist in the season five finale. Darius Rucker also joined her in the show. In November 2020, Rimes released her sixteenth studio record Chant: The Human & the Holy. Its 12 tracks were built from chants and daily mantras rather than traditional songs. A corresponding health and wellness podcast titled Wholly Human followed that focused on similar themes. Rimes produced and composed the album with longtime musical collaborator Darrell Brown. "As I started meditating I started chanting and singing. And as I felt what was coming through needed to come through and felt good, I would press record on my phone and get it down, then expand it from there," Rimes explained of the projects.

In 2022, Rimes released the album God's Work. Rimes celebrated her 25th year in the music industry with a special CMT Crossroads episode featuring Carly Pearce, Brandy Clark, Ashley McBryde and Mickey Guyton airing on April 14, 2022. In April 2023, Rimes collaborated with Tenille Arts on "Jealous of Myself".

== Artistry ==
=== Voice and vocal ability ===
Rimes is a soprano. Critics of her early recordings frequently commented on her vocal maturity relative to her age. Critics took notice from her earliest recordings. Entertainment Weekly's Don McLeese commented, "Though 'Young Country' doesn't get much younger than Rimes, she already shows more poise and maturity than many artists twice her age." In similar vein, The Washington Post wrote in 2005 "Rimes's voice is far and away her strongest selling point. Rich and worldly, it belied her young age – especially when she tackled a vintage-sounding country song like 'Blue'." From a young age, Rimes also chose material that was considered beyond her years. In her first album, Rimes recorded such material as Deborah Allen's "My Baby", whose lyrics say, "my baby is a full-time lover, my baby is a full-grown man." Other material such as Diane Warren's "How Do I Live" had also been considered too mature for Rimes's age and was the main reason why her version of the song was not chosen to be used in the soundtrack for the film Con Air.

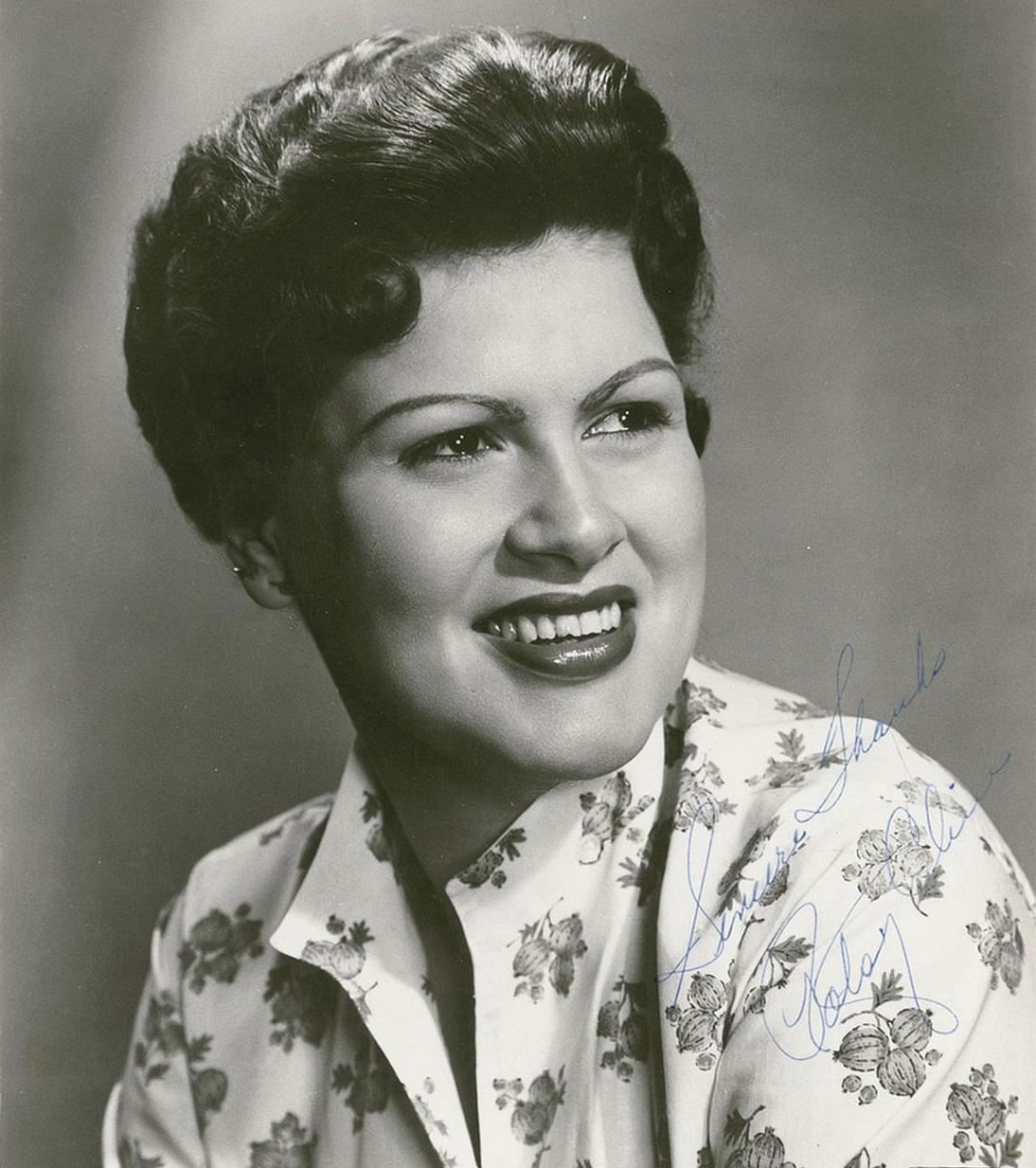
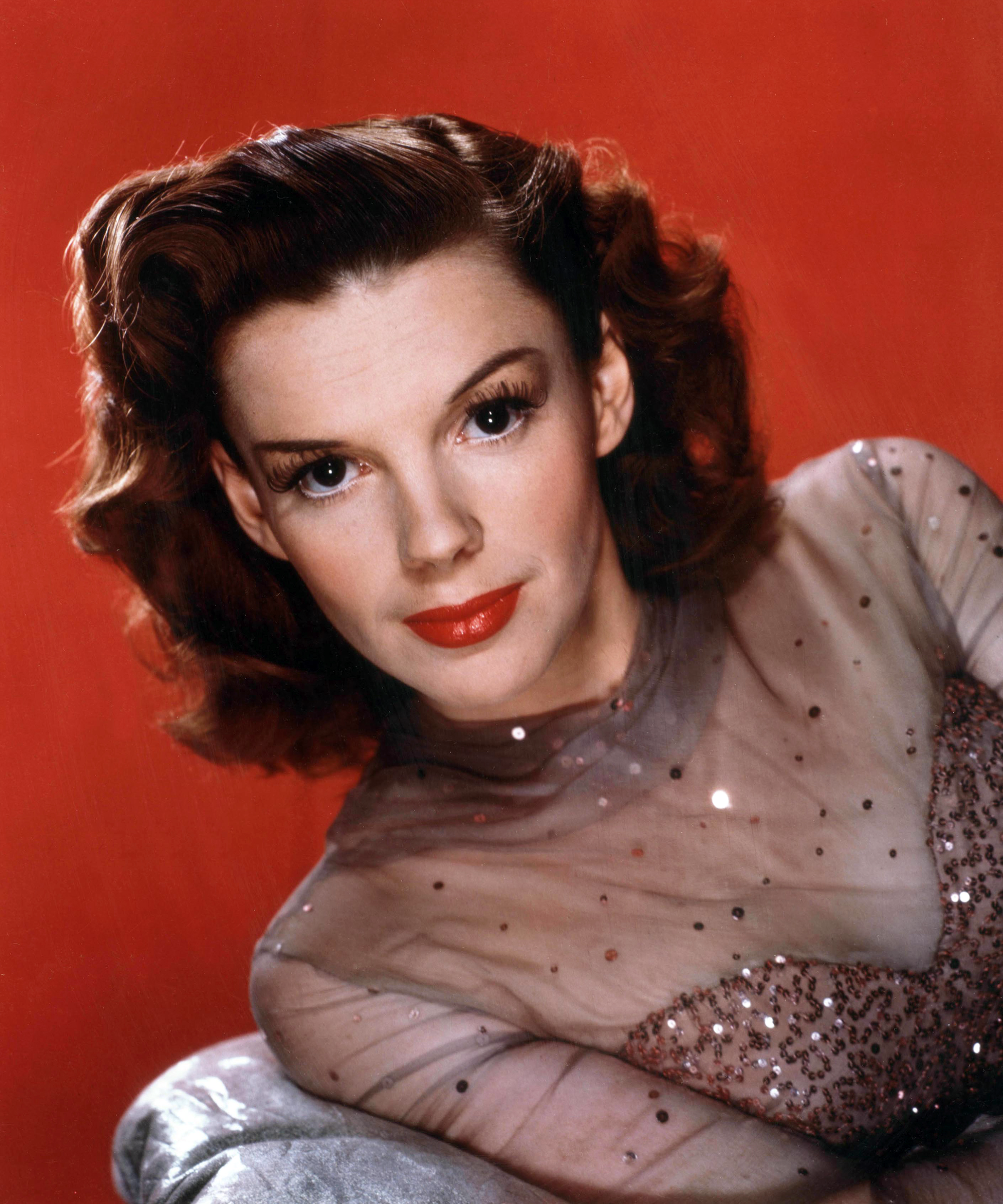
Rimes has credited various music artists as influences on her career, notably Patsy Cline (left) and Judy Garland.

As Rimes matured into adulthood, critics continued to take notice of her voice. In reviewing a 2005 concert, Chrissie Dickinson of The Chicago Tribune found that while her stage presence was lacking, Rimes's voice had significant power: "But what Rimes lacked in stage electricity she made up for in vocal power. She has superlative control over that big voice, a soaring instrument that can belt and whisper within the same song." In reviewing her 2011 album Lady & Gentlemen Stephen Thomas Erlewine stated, "Throughout it all, Rimes hits her marks with ease...she's become a stronger, more nuanced singer over the years." Jessica Goodman of Glamour found that her 2016 song "Remnants" "showcases the powerhouse vocals that made Rimes famous all those years ago."

=== Influences ===
Rimes has credited performers of different musical styles as career influences, including Alanis Morissette, Reba McEntire, Wynonna Judd, Judy Garland, Barbra Streisand and Whitney Houston. Early in her career, Rimes commented on McEntire's influence with The New York Times: "If I had to model my career after anyone it would have to be Reba. She's made some great business decisions in her career to stay around for 20 years, and my biggest goal right now is to stay around for a long time."

Rimes was most notably influenced by Patsy Cline. Listeners and critics drew similarities to Cline's voice through Rimes's phrasing and vocal delivery Rimes later stated that Cline's voice largely influenced the way she created her own unique sound. "[Patsy Cline] was such a huge part of how I created my sound. From [Cline], really it was about this true, honest, emotional connection and the way that she could just take you to a place that you don't normally go within yourself when you listened to her music," she told popculture. In 2013, Rimes performed a tribute to Cline at the American Country Awards she sang a tribute medley of Cline's songs. "I mean I know how much I've been influenced by her and how I feel about her and then you see a sea of people and artists who have been just as influenced and she's touched so many people," she told E!.

=== Musical styles ===
"Long Live Love"
Remnants (2017) spawned the number one dance hit "Long Live Love".

Rimes has been categorized as an adult contemporary artist and in the musical genres of country, pop, teen pop, contemporary Christian, pop rock, and dance-pop. Rimes began her career rooted in the country genre with her debut Curb release Blue and its subsequent country chart hits. Further releases such as "How Do I Live" and the album Sittin' on Top of the World demonstrated a more adult contemporary style. Rimes has also been described as a dance-pop artist, with releases such as "Can't Fight the Moonlight" and the album Twisted Angel. Stephen Thomas Erlewine of AllMusic found that while she dabbled in many styles, Rimes was tied to the country genre: "During the decade that separated "Can't Fight the Moonlight" and Remnants, Rimes dabbled in pop, but she remained anchored in country music, regularly placing on Billboard's Country Top 40 and occasionally landing a big hit."

== Personal life ==
=== Marriages and relationships ===
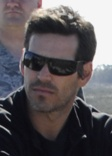
In 2009, Rimes began an extramarital affair with actor Eddie Cibrian. The relationship ended her and Cibrian's first marriages. The couple wed in 2011.

In 1998, Rimes dated actor Andrew Keegan. When they first met, Rimes was 15 and Keegan was 19. The couple dated when Rimes and her father were involved in a lawsuit. In the same lawsuit, Rimes's father claimed that Keegan was attempting to "get his hands" on Rimes's finances. The relationship ended in 2001. According to press reports, Keegan became romantically interested in Rimes's co-star in Coyote Ugly, Piper Perabo.

Shortly after the couple parted ways, Rimes met dancer Dean Sheremet at the 36th Academy of Country Music Awards in 2001. By December, the pair became engaged. In 2002 and at age 19, Rimes married Sheremet in a church ceremony in Dallas, Texas. In 2003, the couple purchased a 1.7 million dollar home, located in Nashville, Tennessee. In 2007, Sheremet directed the choreography for Rimes's single "Nothin' Better to Do". According to People, the couple spent more time apart in later years of their marriage as Rimes devoted energy towards an acting career in Los Angeles while Sheremet remained in Nashville. In July 2009, the couple separated and in September, Rimes announced their plans to divorce. The divorce was finalized on June 19, 2010, exactly six months after Sheremet filed divorce documents for dissolution of marriage.

Rimes began an extramarital affair with actor Eddie Cibrian, with whom she worked on the TV film Northern Lights Reports surfaced in March 2009 of the couple embracing while eating at a restaurant. Television personality Brandi Glanville, Cibrian's then-wife and mother of his two sons, filed for divorce as a result of the affair in August 2009, ending eight years of marriage. In June 2010, Rimes spoke for the first time about the end of her first marriage, stating; "I take responsibility for everything I've done. I hate that people got hurt, but I don't regret the outcome." That month, Rimes moved into Cibrian's California home. In an interview with ABC, Rimes discussed her new relationship: "What happened is not who I am, period. But I do know how much I love him. So I've always said I don't live my life with regret. I can't." In December 2010, it was announced via Billboard that Rimes and Cibrian were engaged. Rimes and Cibrian married on April 22, 2011, at a private home in California. The 40-person ceremony also included Cibrian's sons from his first marriage.

In 2013, the couple bought a home in Hidden Hills, California, listed for three million dollars. By 2018, Rimes and Glanville reconciled, with Glanville stating: "I think we both grew up quite a bit, and we both love Eddie's parents. We both love the kids, and Eddie's going to be in my life for the rest of my life. [...] We're like sister wives. It's me and LeAnn and Eddie."

=== Family challenges and lawsuits ===
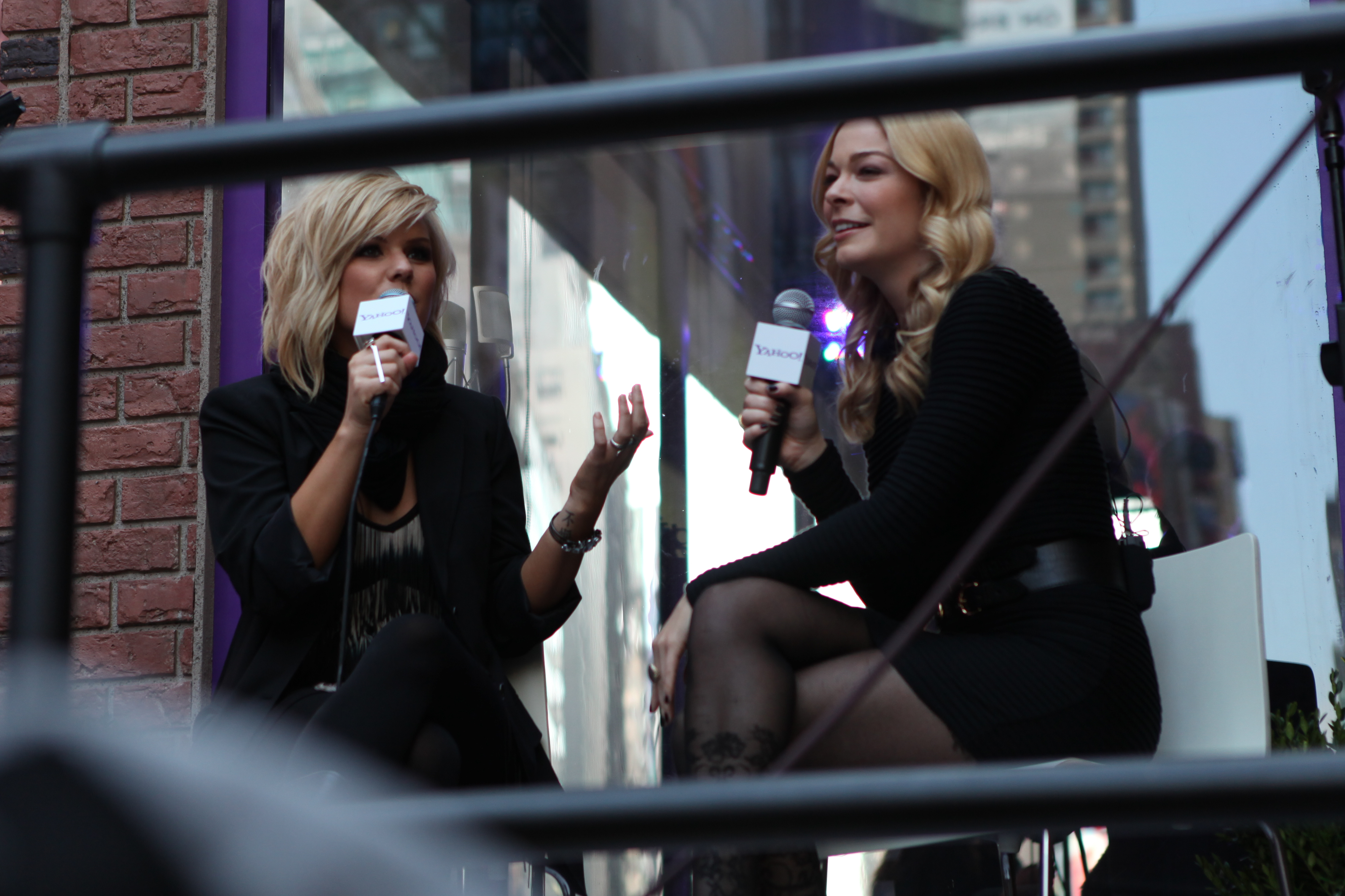
Rimes alongside Kimberly Caldwell conducting an interview in 2009.

From the beginning of Rimes' career, father Wilbur Rimes managed his daughter and served as producer on her records. In May 2000, Rimes and her mother sued Wilbur, alleging that he took more than seven million dollars of her income over the course of five years. The lawsuit claimed that money was being taken away from Rimes personally as well as from a management company that was founded back in 1995. The suit also included her former manager, Lyle Walker, who assisted her father in management duties. The suit was filed in a district court in Dallas, Texas. Rimes sought unspecified damages because her attorney was not sure of how much money had been lost in the preceding five years. In May 2001, she was informed by a Nashville court that she could not break her contract with Curb Records. Amidst the reaction, she visibly mouthed the words, "I hate you" to her father. When Rimes was 18, she filed a lawsuit against Curb Records on her own, successfully petitioning a court to remove her position as a "minority" on the recording contract. As a result, this change made the contract binding.

In 2002, Rimes's lawsuit with her father was "settled on undisclosed terms." "It is difficult to express just how happy I am that all of the legal troubles between my daughter and I are over," Rimes's father commented. Rimes reconciled with her father for her wedding. During her wedding ceremony to Dean Sheremet, Wilbur Rimes walked his daughter down the aisle. "I've never hated my dad. I just wanted a dad. I guess I just really disliked where he was in my life. I just wanted him to be my father," she told ABC News.

=== Health challenges ===
In 2008, she opened up about her lifelong struggle with the autoimmune disease psoriasis. She participated in a PSA to raise awareness about the disease. In August 2012, one day after her birthday, Rimes checked into treatment for anxiety and stress. "This is just a time for me to emotionally check out for a second and take care of myself and come back in 30 days as the best 30-year-old woman I can be," she explained. In March 2014, Rimes's jaw became dislocated while performing, ending her concert encore early. Rimes attributed the dislocation to temporomandibular joint dysfunction, a disorder of the jaw joint and surrounding muscles. She has publicly posted about her struggles with this disorder via Twitter. In 2020, following a stress-related flare up of psoriasis, Rimes posed for a nude photo shoot for Glamour magazine as part of her efforts to raise awareness and acceptance about the disease on 2020 World Psoriasis Day (observed October 29). Later that year, she told People magazine that in addition to anxiety and stress, she was also suffering from depression in 2010: "It's something I've been very vocal about, because I feel like there's so much stigma around it."

== Philanthropy ==
Rimes lent her voice to the 2008 song "Just Stand Up". The proceeds benefited Stand Up to Cancer. As a result of SU2C fundraising endeavors, the SU2C scientific advisory committee, overseen by the American Association for Cancer Research, was able to award $73.6 million towards cancer research. In 2009, Rimes was given a special humanitarian award from the Academy of Country Music in honor of her philanthropic efforts. In December 2010, she performed "The Rose", joined by The Gay Men's Chorus of Los Angeles in remembrance of the many gay teenagers who died by suicide in 2010. On her weblog she wrote on June 18, 2011: "I believe in equality for everyone. I believe everyone should have the right to love and commit to whomever they want. [...] All I know is that in God's eyes we are all the same. I just wish we could see through the eyes of God more often." In 2017, Rimes revealed that her uncle was gay and died from the AIDS virus. "Now, every time, everywhere I get to sing—or when I get stand up alongside my LGBTQ brothers and sisters—I get to give him a voice," she commented.

== Discography ==
Studio albums

- Everybody's Sweetheart (1991)
- All That (1994)
- Blue (1996)
- You Light Up My Life: Inspirational Songs (1997)
- Sittin' on Top of the World (1998)
- LeAnn Rimes (1999)
- I Need You (2001)
- Twisted Angel (2002)
- What a Wonderful World (2004)
- This Woman (2005)
- Whatever We Wanna (2006)
- Family (2007)
- Lady & Gentlemen (2011)
- Spitfire (2013)
- Today Is Christmas (2015)
- Remnants (2016)
- Chant: The Human & the Holy (2020)
- God's Work (2022)

== Filmography ==
- Holiday in Your Heart (1997)
- Days of Our Lives (1998)
- Moesha (1999)
- Coyote Ugly (2000)
- American Dreams (2003)
- Holly Hobbie and Friends: Christmas Wishes (2006)
- Northern Lights (2009)
- Good Intentions (2010)
- Drop Dead Diva (2011)
- Anger Management (2013)
- It's Christmas, Eve (2018)
- Country Comfort (2021)
- 9-1-1: Nashville (2025)

== Achievements and accolades ==
Rimes has won several awards for her work as a music artist. This includes three accolades from the Academy of Country Music and two accolades from the Grammy Awards. As of April 2025, Rimes has sold over 48 million records worldwide.

== Books ==
- Holiday in Your Heart (1997) with Tom Carter
- Jag (2003)
- Jag's New Friend (2004)
- What I Cannot Change (2009) with Darrell Brown
