= List of songs written by Desmond Child =

This is a list of songs written or co-written by American songwriter Desmond Child.

Aerosmith

- "Ain't That a Bitch"
- "Angel"
- "Crazy"
- "Dude (Looks Like a Lady)"
- "Flesh"
- "Heart's Done Time"
- "Hole in My Soul"
- "What It Takes"

Csézy

- "Csak egy nô" (Just a woman)

David Archuleta

- "Desperate"

Clay Aiken

- "Run to Me"
- "These Open Arms"

Animotion

- "Calling It Love"

Sebastian Bach

- "Falling Into You"

Jimmy Barnes

- "Waitin' for the Heartache"
- "Walk On"
- "Let's Make it Last All Night"

Robin Beck

- "If You Were a Woman and I Was a Man"
- "Hide Your Heart"
- "Hold Back The Night"
- "Jewel In My Crown"
- "Save Up All Your Tears"
- "Tears in the Rain"

Petra Berger

- "Requiem"

Bif Naked

- "I Love Myself Today"

Blackhawk

- "It Ain't About Love Anymore"
- "Hole In My Heart"

Michael Bolton

- "How Can We Be Lovers?"
- "Love Cuts Deep"
- "Forever Isn't Long Enough"
- "New Love"
- "Save Me"
- "The One Thing"
- "In the Arms of Love"

Bon Jovi

- "You Give Love a Bad Name"
- "Livin' on a Prayer"
- "Without Love"
- "I'd Die For You"
- "Bad Medicine"
- "Born to Be My Baby"
- "Blood on Blood"
- "Wild is the Wind"
- "Keep the Faith"
- "I'll Sleep When I'm Dead"
- "Something for the Pain"
- "This Ain't a Love Song" / "Como Yo Nadie Te Ha Amado" (Spanish version)
- "Hearts Breaking Even"
- "Diamond Ring"
- "The Distance"
- "Misunderstood"
- "All About Lovin' You"
- "Hook Me Up"
- "Bells of Freedom"
- "Dirty Little Secret"
- "(You Want to) Make a Memory"
- "Let's Make it Baby" (demo, special release)
- "Brokenpromiseland"
- "Fast Cars"
- "Happy Now"
- "Learn to Love"
- "Army of One"

Bonfire

- "The Price of Loving You"
- "Sword and Stone"

Boyzone

- "All the Time in the World"

Cher

- "Emotional Fire"
- "Does Anybody Really Fall In Love Anymore?"
- "Just Like Jesse James"
- "Save Up All Your Tears"
- "We All Sleep Alone"
- "Perfection"
- "Working Girl"
- "Give Our Love a Fighting Chance"
- "Love On A Rooftop"
- "Main Man"

Chicago

- "All Roads Lead to You"

Kelly Clarkson

- "Before Your Love"

Alice Cooper

- "Poison"
- "Spark in the Dark"
- "House of Fire"
- "Why Trust You"
- "Bed of Nails"
- "This Maniac's In Love With You"
- "Trash"
- "Hell is Living Without You"
- "I'm Your Gun"
- "Dangerous Tonight"
- "Might As Well Be On Mars"
- "I Am Made of You"
- "The Underture"

Miranda Cosgrove

- "Beautiful Mess"

D-Side

- "Invisible"
- "Can We Dance"
- "I'd Be Lyin'"
- "My Best Chance"

Hazell Dean

- "Livin' on a Prayer"

Diana DeGarmo

- "Dreams"
- "Emotional"
- "Reaching For Heaven"

Dream Theater

- "You Not Me"

Haylie Duff

- "Whatever Life"

Hilary Duff

- "Who's That Girl?"
- "Crash World"

FM

- "Bad Luck"
- "Burning My Heart Down"

Ace Frehley

- "Hide Your Heart"

Selena Gomez

- "Love Will Remember"

Alejandra Guzmán

- "Quiero Vivir" ("I Want to Live", Spanish translation of "Old Before I Die")
- "Volveré a Amar"
- "Todo"
- "Vagabundo Corazón"
- "Soy Tu Lluvia"

Hall & Oates

- "And That's What Hurts"

Hanson

- "Weird"

Chesney Hawkes

- "Waiting for the Night"

Ty Herndon with Stephanie Bentley

- "Heart Half Empty"

Sarah Hudson

- "Girl on the Verge"
- "Fake Rain"

INXS

- "Afterglow"

Joan Jett & the Blackhearts

- "I Hate Myself for Loving You"
- "Little Liar"
- "You Want In and I Want Out"
- "Ashes In The Wind"
- "The Only Good Thing (You Ever Said Was Goodbye)"
- "Lie to Me"
- "Don't Surrender"
- "Goodbye"
- "As I Am"
- "You Got A Problem"
- "Brighter Day"

Jonas Brothers

- "You Just Don't Know It"

Kiss

- "I Was Made For Lovin' You"
- "I've Had Enough (Into the Fire)"
- "Heaven's on Fire"
- "Under the Gun"
- "King of the Mountain"
- "Who Wants to Be Lonely"
- "I'm Alive"
- "Radar for Love"
- "Uh! All Night"
- "Bang Bang You"
- "My Way"
- "Reason to Live"
- "You Love Me to Hate You"
- "Let's Put The X In Sex"
- "(You Make Me) Rock Hard"
- "Hide Your Heart"

Cyndi Lauper

- "Insecurious"

La Ley

- "Más Allá"

Lindsay Lohan

- "I Live For The Day"

Mitch Malloy

- "Music Box"
- "Cowboy and the Ballerina"

Ricky Martin

- "Livin' la Vida Loca"
- "Spanish Eyes" ("La Diosa del Carnaval")
- "I Am Made of You"
- "I'm On My Way"
- "The Cup of Life" ("La Copa De La Vida")
- "Love You for a Day"
- "She Bangs"
- "Saint Tropez"
- "Nobody Wants to Be Lonely"
- "Jezabel"
- "The Touch"
- "Are You In It For Love"
- "Shake Your Bon-Bon"

Jesse McCartney

- "Because You Live"

Stephanie McIntosh

- "The Night Of My Life"

Meat Loaf

- "The Monster Is Loose"
- "Blind as a Bat"
- "If God Could Talk"
- "What About Love?"
- "Alive"
- "Monstro"
- "Elvis in Vegas"
- "I Wanna Be With You" (unreleased)

Michelle

- "Emotional"

Mika

- "Erase"

Billie Myers

- "A Few Words Too Many"
- "Kiss the Rain"

Alannah Myles

- "Bad 4 You"

Vince Neil

- "Promise Me"

O-Town

- "Love Should Be A Crime"

Katy Perry

- "Waking Up in Vegas"

Play

- "Let's Get to the Love Part"

Marion Raven

- "Good 4 Sex"
- "October"

Chynna Phillips

- "Jewel in my Crown"
- "This Close"
- "I Live for You"

The Rasmus

- "Jezebel"
- "Rise"
- "Live and Never Die"
- "Livin' In a World Without You"
- "Ten Black Roses"
- "Ghost of Love"
- "Justify"
- "Your Forgiveness"
- "Run to You"
- "You Got it Wrong"
- "Lost and Lonely"
- "The Fight"
- "Dangerous Kind"
- "Live Forever"

Ratt

- "Givin' Yourself Away"
- "Lovin' You's a Dirty Job"
- "One Step Away"
- "Shame Shame Shame"
- "Can't Wait on Love"
- "Scratch That Itch"
- "Hard Time"
- "Heads I Win, Tails You Lose"
- "All or Nothing"
- "Top Secret"

LeAnn Rimes

- "Life Goes On"
- "Suddenly"
- "The Safest Place"
- "Sign of Life"
- "Review My Kisses"
- "Love Is an Army"
- "You Made Me Find Myself"
- "Twisted Angel"

Kane Roberts

- "Wild Nights"
- "Twisted"
- "Does Anybody Really Fall In Love Anymore?"
- "Dance Little Sister"
- "Rebel Heart"
- "You Always Want It"
- "Fighter"
- "I'm Not Lookin' For An Angel"
- "Too Far Gone"
- "It's Only Over For You"

Sakis Rouvas

- "Ola Kala"
- "Oso Zo"
- "Mia Zoi Mazi"
- "Kati Omorfo"
- "Disco Girl"

Roxette

- "You Don't Understand Me"

Lesley Roy

- "Misfit"

RuPaul

- "If You Were a Woman (And I Was a Man)"

Jennifer Rush

- "Heart Wars"
- "Love of a Stranger"
- "Down to You"
- "Everything"
- "Waiting for the Heartache"
- "Timeless Love"
- "Tears in the Rain"
- "In the Arms of Love"

Richie Sambora

- "Father Time"
- "Rosie"

Saraya

- "Timeless Love"

Scorpions

- "Hour 1"
- "The Game of Life"
- "The Future Never Dies"
- "You're Lovin' Me to Death"
- "321"
- "Love Will Keep Us Alive"
- "We Will Rise Again"
- "Your Last Song"
- "Love is War"
- "The Cross"
- "Humanity"
- "Cold"

Shakira

- "Tu Seras Historia De Mi Vida"

Victoria Shaw

- "Where Your Road Leads"

JoJo Siwa

- "Karma"

Billy Squier

- "Stronger"
- "Tied Up"

Paul Stanley

- "Live To Win"
- "Lift"
- "Wake Up Screaming"
- "All About You"
- "Where Angels Dare"

Paul Stanley and Desmond Child

- " Shocker" Shocker OST

Joss Stone

- "Right To Be Wrong"
- "Don't Cha Wanna Ride"

Amanda Stott

- "Homeless Heart"

Barbra Streisand

- "Lady Liberty"

Swirl 360

- "Love Should Be a Crime"
- "There"

Three Graces

- "Requiem"

Tokio Hotel

- "Zoom/Zoom Into Me"
- "Strange (feat. Kerli)"

Laura Turner

- "The Touch"

Bonnie Tyler

- "If You Were a Woman (And I Was a Man)"
- "Lovers Again"
- "Notes From America"
- "Hide Your Heart"
- "Save Up All Your Tears"
- "Take Another Look at Your Heart"
- "Believe in Me"
- "Stubborn"
- "Stronger Than a Man"

Carrie Underwood

- "Inside Your Heaven"

Steve Vai

- "In My Dreams With You"

Maria Vidal

- "Do Me Right"

John Waite

- "These Times Are Hard for Lovers"

Weezer

- "Trainwrecks"

Robbie Williams

- "Old Before I Die"

Winger

- "Proud Desperado"

Trisha Yearwood with Garth Brooks

- "Where Your Road Leads"

Ace Young

- "Addicted"
- "A Hard Hand to Hold"
- "Where Will You Go"
- "How You Gonna Spend Your Life"
- "The Girl That Got Away"
- "Dirty Mind"
- "The Gift"

Zedd

- "Beautiful Now"

2Be3

- "Excuse My French"
- "Whatchagonnado"
- "Love 4 Sale"
- "Come Into My Life"
