= Vertigo (Billie Myers album) =

Studio album by Billie Myers
- Released: 6 June 2000
- Genre: Pop rock
- Length: 55:23
- Label: Universal Records
- Producer: David Tyson

Billie Myers chronology
Growing, Pains (1997)	Vertigo (2000)	Tea & Sympathy (2013)

Professional ratings
Review scores
Source	Rating
AllMusic	3/5 stars
Courier-News	3/4 stars
The Encyclopedia of Popular Music	3/5 stars
Portland Press Herald	B
Windsor Star	4/5 stars

Vertigo is the second studio album by Billie Myers, released in 2000.

== Production ==
The album was produced by David Tyson.

== Critical reception ==
AllMusic called the album "another solid set of emotional stories and passionate songs." Vibe wrote that Myers "has developed an ear for consistently potent, often provocative lyrics." The Los Angeles Daily News wrote that "the disc is a lot more diverse than the debut, with infusions of '60s rock, the Beatles and soul."

== Track listing ==
1. "Am I Here Yet? (Return to Sender)" (David Tyson / Billie Myers) – 4:48
2. "Should I Call You Jesus?" (Peter Vale / Myers) – 5:10
3. "Vertigo" (Tyson / Michael Lattanzi / Myers) – 5:40
4. "Without My Consent" (Vale / Myers) – 3:39
5. "A Room Full of View" (Desmond Child / Myers) – 6:39
6. "Flexible" (David Austin / Myers) – 4:31
7. "Where Romeo Never Dies" (Vale / Myers) – 3:57
8. "Never Let Them See You Cry" (Tyson / Myers) – 5:35
9. "Roll Over Beethoven" (Tyson / Myers) – 4:56
10. "Afraid of Spiders" (Vale / Myers) – 4:39
11. "Bitter Fruit" (Bruce Roberts / Myers) – 5:45
