= Tell Me (Billie Myers song) =

Single by Billie Myers

from the album Growing, Pains
- Released: 1998
- Genre: Alternative rock
- Length: 5:04
- Label: Universal
- Songwriters: David Austin; Billie Myers
- Producer: Desmond Child

Billie Myers singles chronology
"Kiss the Rain" (1997)	"Tell Me" (1998)	"A Few Words Too Many" (1998)

Music video
- "Tell Me" on YouTube

"Tell Me" is a song by British singer-songwriter Billie Myers, released in 1998, by Universal Records, as the second single from her debut album, Growing, Pains (1997). It is co-written by Myers with David Austin and produced by Desmond Child. The song peaked at number 28 on the UK Singles Chart, which compared to her previous single "Kiss the Rain" was a commercial failure. Additionally, "Tell Me" was a top-40 hit in New Zealand and a top-60 hit in the Netherlands. The accompanying music video features Myers performing in a nightclub.

== Critical reception ==
Larry Flick from Billboard magazine wrote that the song "has a stompin' alterna-rock attack that allows Myers to flex her quivering, melodramatic vocal style to maximum effect." He added further that producer Desmond Child's "pop savvy is evident in a mix that counters the forceful guitar/drum execution with cushiony keyboards and a spree of fluttering sitar lines. Holding everything together is a sticky chorus that picks up to an anthemic pace by the track's close. In fact, it's easy to see a sea of punters chanting and punching the air in unison during a live performance of this hit-bound gem." Gerald Martinez from New Sunday Times described it as "a whimsical song where she imagines she is the person making love to her."

== Versions ==
1. LP version - 5:04
2. Radio edit (LP edit) - 4:03
3. Alternative radio remix - 6:31
4. Alternative radio edit - 3:46
5. Victor Calderone club mix - 7:39 (promo)

== Charts ==
Chart (1998)	Peak position
Europe (Eurochart Hot 100)	98
Netherlands (Dutch Top 40 Tipparade)	4
Netherlands (Single Top 100)	52
Netherlands Airplay (Music & Media)	22
New Zealand (Recorded Music NZ)	39
Scotland (OCC)	23
UK Singles (OCC)	28
UK Airplay (Music Week)	44
US Adult Pop Airplay (Billboard)	25
US Pop Airplay (Billboard)	34
