= Out of My Hands (Jennifer Rush album) =

Studio album by Jennifer Rush
- Released: February 5, 1995
- Studio: Unique Recording Studios, Masterphonics, Cove City Sound Studios, The Dream Factory, Right Track Recording, Criteria Recording, Sarm West, Maarweg Studios, Rock Bottom Sound, Ocean Way Recording, Network Studios, Sound Everest Studio
- Label: EMI; Electrola
- Producer: David Austin; Roland Baumgartner; Desmond Child; Peter Columbus; Jürgen Fritz; Andy Goldmark; Ric Wake; Peter Zizzo

Jennifer Rush chronology
Jennifer Rush (1992)	Out of My Hands (1995)	Credo (1997)

Singles from Out of My Hands
- 1. "Tears in the Rain" Released: January 1995; 2. "Out of My Hands" Released: 1995

Out of My Hands is the seventh studio album by American singer Jennifer Rush. It was released by Electrola on February 5, 1995.

== Background ==
There were plans for Jennifer to release a new album in 1994, but ultimately Out of My Hands did not come out until early 1995.

Commercially, the album improved on Rush's previous one by reaching number 15 on the German Albums Chart during a four-month chart run. Out of My Hands was led by single "Tears in the Rain," a song originally recorded by Robin Beck. "Tears in the Rain" became Rush's biggest single of the decade, charting highly in many European countries, particularly in Germany. A second single was released, the title track "Out of My Hands", while the album boasted a collaboration with Brian May on the Queen cover "Who Wants to Live Forever," which was released as a promo-only single.

== Track listing ==
No.	Title	Writer(s)	Producer(s)	Length
1.	"Tears in the Rain"	Desmond Child; Diane Warren	Child	4:56
2.	"Out of My Hands"	Warren; Jon Secada; Miguel A. Morejon	Ric Wake	4:33
3.	"In the Arms of Love"	Child; Warren; Michael Bolton	Child	4:53
4.	"Fortress"	David Austin; Jennifer Rush	Austin	4:46
5.	"Shocked"	Arnie Roman; Russ DeSalvo	Wake	4:00
6.	"Who Wants to Live Forever"	Brian May	Jürgen Fritz	3:59
7.	"Untouchable"	Robert White Johnson; Taylor Rhodes	Andy Goldmark	4:19
8.	"Only Heaven Knows"	Bernd Adamkewitz; Rush	Peter Zizzo; Wake	4:35
9.	"Crazy 'Bout You"	Albert Hammond; Goldmark	Goldmark	4:09
10.	"Cry, Baby..."	Joachim Bauer; Roland Baumgartner	Peter Columbus; Baumgartner (co.)	3:53
11.	"Nights in White Satin"	Justin Hayward	Fritz	4:29

== Charts ==
=== Weekly charts ===
Weekly chart performance for Out of My Hands
Chart (1995)	Peak position
Austrian Albums (Ö3 Austria)	30
German Albums (Offizielle Top 100)	15
Swiss Albums (Schweizer Hitparade)	28

=== Year-end charts ===
Year-end chart performance for Out of My Hands
Chart (1995)	Position
German Albums (Offizielle Top 100)	74
