= Rebecca Simonsson =

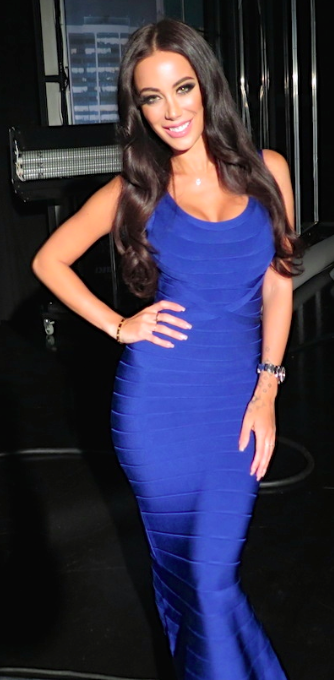
- Rebecca Simonsson (2014)

Background information
- Born: Rebecca Stella Simonsson; 29 September 1985 (age 40)
- Origin: Borås, Sweden
- Genres: Pop
- Occupations: Singer, glamour model, designer, blogger, tv-host

Rebecca Stella Simonsson (born 29 September 1985) is a Swedish singer, designer, glamour model, TV-host and blogger.

== Personal life ==
Simonsson was raised in Viskafors in the outskirts of Borås and lives in Los Angeles, USA. Simonsson is the daughter of a Syriac-Lebanese father and a Greek mother. She also has a younger brother and two halfsisters from her fathers side.

== Career ==
Simonsson's breakthrough came when she became a member of the Euro disco music group Sunblock, consisting of three Swedish glamour models. The group consists of two male producers and the three models who are the focal point. The group had three hits: the Baywatch song "I'll Be Ready", "First Time" by Robin Beck and "Baby Baby" by Corona. They toured over parts of the world for one and a half years before their eventual breakup.

Later she became manager for an industrial products company and also managed the nightclub Hell's Kitchen. She has appeared in articles in GQ, FHM and The Sun. In GQ they wrote: "This group is the sexiest thing since The Pussycat Dolls and much cooler". With Sunblock, she entered the Top 10 in the British music charts. Sunblock was also nominated for a Swedish Grammis in the club music category.

In 2010, Simonsson released her first solo music single called "Swag in a Bag" under the name Rebecca Stella. In 2012, her second single, "Give Me that O", was released on Ultra Records.

== Fashion ==
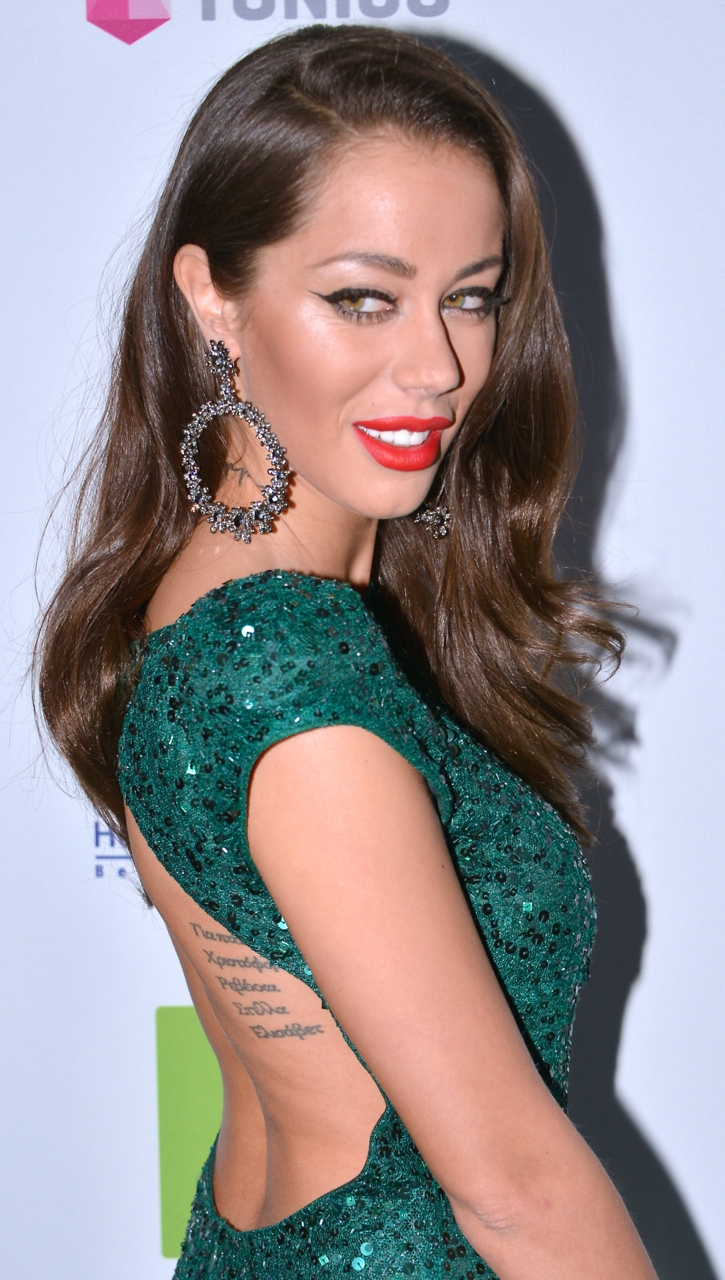
Rebecca Simonsson, 2013

Simonsson has created and released two fashion collections: one for the clothing website Nelly.com and one for the store Solo. Her collection for Nelly.com went under the name "Rebecca Stella for Nelly".

She was named "Best dressed Swedish woman" by the magazine S, and was nominated for the title of "Fashionista of the year" by several magazines such as Chic and Veckorevyn. At the 2013 Chic magazine Gala she won the "most chic fashionista award".

She has been called "nightclub queen" by various publications.

== Media ==
Simonsson has hosted the "After the show discussions" show for several TV3 productions such as the first season of the Swedish version of Project Runway and Paradise Hotel (Paradise Hotel: Eftersnack) in 2013. She has appeared in commercials for and been spokeswoman for Thierry Mugler's perfume Womanity.

She has also appeared on Vakna med The Voice, Stylisterna, Extra! Extra! and the show Hannah & Amanda.

During 2012, a web-based reality show that followed Simonsson's life was created by the production company Pocketfilm, owned by Kristian Luuk.

Simonsson appears in a film about Stockholm's club-going celebrities in a multi-media art display titled 150 Years of Club Kids hosted by the Museum of Spirits in Stockholm and co-sponsored by the local club Bern. The multimedia experience showcases historical and modern Club Kids. Simonsson plays herself as a modern Club Kid.

Simonsson was the first celebrity dancer to be voted off in Let's Dance 2015.
