= Tic Toc (LeAnn Rimes song) =

Single by LeAnn Rimes

from the album Twisted Angel
- Released: November 11, 2002
- Length: 3:40
- Label: Curb
- Songwriter(s): Peter Amato; Gregg Pagani; Christina Rumbley
- Producer(s): Desmond Child; Peter Amato; Gregg Pagani

LeAnn Rimes singles chronology
"Life Goes On" (2002)	"Tic Toc" (2002)	"Suddenly" (2003)

"Tic Toc" is a song recorded by American country music artist LeAnn Rimes. It was written by Peter Amato, Gregg Pagani, and Christina Rumbley, and produced by the former two along with Desmond Child. It was released to US contemporary hit radio on November 11, 2002, as the second single from Rimes's fifth studio album Twisted Angel (2002).

"Tic Toc" peaked at number 10 on the US Dance Club Songs chart.

== Content ==
Rimes said of the song: "Yes, it's orgasmic. That's pretty much what it's all about. When my mom first heard it, I thought she was going to fall over. She said: "Those lyrics are pretty explicit, but I like the song... I guess you're old enough to sing it. After all, you're married now." Even though she was taken aback at first, it's become one of her favorite songs from the record. Once again, it's a departure from everything I've done. I've listened to a lot of techno and dance songs over the last three years and I really enjoy that kind of music. I think that's reflected in this song. My favorite part of "Tic Toc" is the string arrangements. You have a song that's so techno, but with live strings — that's unique."

== Critical reception ==
"Tic Toc" received negative reviews from music critics. When reviewing the single, Billboard gave the song an unfavorable review by saying, "Rimes has employed a skittish, grinding groove and a latter-day Britney-esque hip-hop sensibility that just doesn't mesh with the singer's whitebread roots. Every artist deserves the chance to evolve, but despite radio's penchant for all things urban, this shoe is on the wrong foot. "Tic Toc" just doesn't click." Entertainment Weekly wrote that Rimes was not a convincing "sex kitten" on the song, after spending her early career as a "teen country grinner".

== Commercial performance ==
"Tic Toc" charted briefly on the Radio & Records CHR/Pop Top 50 Indicator, debuting at number 47 on the chart with 316 total plays on December 13, 2002. The following week, it rose to its peak position of number 45 on the chart. It spent three weeks on the chart.

Buoyed by remixes from Widelife, Thunderpuss and Mike Rizzo, "Tic Toc" appeared on the Dance Club Songs chart the week of March 1, 2003, at number 38. It peaked at number ten for the week of April 19, 2003. It spent 13 weeks in total on the chart.

== Track listings ==
Thunderpuss Mixes
No.	Title	Length
1.	"Tic Toc" (Thunderpuss Club)	9:01
2.	"Tic Toc" (Thunderpuss Mixshow)	6:51
3.	"Tic Toc" (Thunderpuss Tribepella)	6:54

Widelife & Mike Rizzo Mixes
No.	Title	Length
1.	"Tic Toc" (Widelife Club)	9:40
2.	"Tic Toc" (Widelife Mix Show)	6:41
3.	"Tic Toc" (Mike Rizzo Club)	7:11

== Charts ==
Chart performance for "Tic Toc"
Chart (2003)	Peak position
US Dance Club Songs (Billboard)	10

== Release history ==
Release dates and format(s) for "Tic Toc"
Region	Date	Format(s)	Label(s)	Ref.
United States	November 11, 2002	Contemporary hit radio	Curb	
