= Tears in the Rain (Robin Beck song) =

Song written by Diane Warren and Desmond Child

Single by Robin Beck

from the album Trouble or Nothin'
- B-side: "A Heart for You"
- Released: 1989
- Length: 4:42
- Label: Mercury Records
- Songwriters: Diane Warren; Desmond Child
- Producer: Desmond Child

Robin Beck singles chronology
"Save Up All Your Tears" (1989)	"Tears in the Rain" (1989)	"Don't Lose Any Sleep" (1990)

Music video
- "Tears in the Rain" on YouTube

"Tears in the Rain" is a song written by Diane Warren and Desmond Child, and originally released by American singer Robin Beck in 1989 on her second album Trouble or Nothin'. It was later covered by Jennifer Rush for her 1995 album Out of My Hands.

== Background ==
"Tears in the Rain" was released as the third single from Trouble or Nothin' in late 1989. The single only charted in Austria and West Germany, and did not reach the same success as Beck's previous two singles "First Time" and "Save Up All Your Tears".

== Track listings ==
- European 7-inch single
- European 3-inch CD single
1. "Tears in the Rain" (Single version) – 4:02
2. "A Heart for You" – 4:13
- European 12-inch single
- European 5-inch CD maxi-single
1. "Tears in the Rain" (Album version) – 4:42
2. "A Heart for You" – 4:13
3. "In a Crazy World Like This" – 3:56

== Charts ==
Chart (1989)	Peak position
Austria (Ö3 Austria Top 40)	21
West Germany (GfK)	22

== Jennifer Rush version ==
"Tears in the Rain"

Single by Jennifer Rush

from the album Out of My Hands
- Released: January 1995
- Length: 4:56
- Label: EMI Records
- Songwriters: Diane Warren; Desmond Child
- Producer: Desmond Child

Jennifer Rush singles chronology
"A Broken Heart" (1993)	"Tears in the Rain" (1995)	"Out of My Hands" (1995)

Music video
- "Tears in the Rain" on YouTube

"Tears in the Rain" was covered by American singer Jennifer Rush for her 1995 album Out of My Hands and was released in January 1995 by EMI Records as the lead single from that album. The single was produced by Desmond Child and charted in Germany and Switzerland, becoming Jennifer's highest-charting single of the 1990s in both countries.

=== Critical reception ===
Pan-European magazine Music & Media wrote, "ACE [Adult Contemporary Europe] stations which edit power ballads by cutting out the guitar solo, will have no difficulties with this keyboard-dominated one featuring a slightly disguised reggae intermezzo."

=== Track list ===
- CD single
1. "Tears in the Rain" (Radio Edit) – 4:03
2. "Only Heaven Knows" – 4:35
3. "Cry, Baby..." – 3:53

=== Charts ===
Chart (1995)	Peak position
Germany (GfK)	45
Switzerland (Schweizer Hitparade)	26
