= Suddenly (LeAnn Rimes song) =

2003 single by LeAnn Rimes

- Commercial artwork

Single by LeAnn Rimes

from the album Twisted Angel and View from the Top: Motion Picture Soundtrack
- Released: February 24, 2003
- Studio: Various
- Length: 3:58
- Label: Curb
- Songwriters: Desmond Child; Andreas Carlsson
- Producers: Desmond Child; Peter Amato; Gregg Pagani

LeAnn Rimes singles chronology
"Tic Toc" (2002)	"Suddenly" (2003)	"We Can" (2003)

Alternative cover
- Promotional US artwork

Audio sample
- The first chorus of "Suddenly": file; help

"Suddenly" is a song by American country music artist LeAnn Rimes, released as the third and final single from her fifth studio album Twisted Angel (2002) on February 24, 2003. The song was written by Desmond Child and Andreas Carlsson and produced by the former along with Peter Amato and Gregg Pagani. The song was included in the soundtrack for the 2003 box-office bomb View from the Top.

It was a commercial failure, only peaking within the top forty in New Zealand and Scotland. In the US, the song peaked at number 43 on the US Hot Country Songs chart. Two music videos were filmed for the song, both of which were directed by Cameron Casey.

== Commercial performance ==
In the United States, "Suddenly" debuted on the Billboard Hot Country Singles & Tracks chart on the week of March 8, 2003, at number 54. It reached a peak of number 43 on the chart the week of May 3, 2003, spending 15 weeks on the Hot 100. "Suddenly" debuted and peaked at number 53 on the Australian ARIA Singles Chart. In neighboring New Zealand, "Suddenly" debuted at number 46 on the New Zealand Singles Chart on May 11, 2003. It spent 10 weeks on the chart in total and peaked at number 24, becoming Rimes's third entry after "Can't Fight the Moonlight" and "Life Goes On".

In the United Kingdom, "Suddenly" debuted at number 47 on the UK Singles Chart the week of March 8, 2003. It would only spend one more week before falling off entirely. The song performed slightly better in Scotland, debuting at number 33 on the Scottish Singles Chart. The song debuted and peaked at number 90 on the German Singles Chart on March 3, 2003, being her last single to chart there as of 2026. The only other country the song charted in was in the Netherlands, where it debuted at number 93 on the Single Top 100 chart and spent only three weeks in total.

== Music video ==
Cameron Casey directed the music video for the song. Two videos were created for the song. Both feature Rimes at a party; one version uses cut scenes of its parent film View from the Top while the other replaces the movie scenes with regular shots. The video premiered to CMT on March 17, 2003.

== Track listings ==
UK CD single

1. "Suddenly" – 3:57
2. "Suddenly" (DJ Encore radio edit) – 3:53
3. "Suddenly" (Riva radio edit) – 4:10
4. "Suddenly" (Almighty radio edit) – 3:57
5. "Suddenly" (video) – 3:57

UK cassette single

1. "Suddenly" – 3:57
2. "Suddenly" (DJ Encore radio edit) – 3:53

European CD single

1. "Suddenly" – 3:57
2. "Suddenly" (Riva extended mix) – 8:13

European maxi-CD single

1. "Suddenly" (album version) – 3:57
2. "Suddenly" (Click Music edit) – 3:36
3. "Suddenly" (Riva edit) – 4:08
4. "Suddenly" (Almighty edit) – 3:55
5. "Suddenly" (DJ Encore edit) – 3:49

Australian CD single

1. "Suddenly"
2. "Suddenly" (Riva radio edit)
3. "Suddenly" (Almighty radio edit)
4. "Suddenly" (Almighty extended mix)

== Credits and personnel ==
Credits are taken from the Twisted Angel booklet.

Studios

- Recorded at various studios in the United States and United Kingdom
- Strings recorded at Cello Studios (Hollywood, California)
- Mixed at Larrabee West (Hollywood, California) and Larrabee North (Universal City, California)
- Lead vocals mixed at Larrabee North (Universal City, California)
- Mastered at Bernie Grundman Mastering (Hollywood, California)

Main personnel

- LeAnn Rimes – vocals, background vocals
- Desmond Child – writing, production
- Andreas Carlsson – writing, background vocals, bass
- Jeanette Olsson – background vocals
- Corky James – guitar, bass
- Peter Amato – keyboards, production, arrangement, programming
- Gregg Pagani – keyboards, production, arrangement, programming
- Steve Ferrone – drums
- Humberto Gatica – recording (strings)
- Rob Chiarelli – mixing
- Bernie Grundman – mastering

Orchestra

- Joel Derouin – violin, concertmaster
- Charlie Bisharat – violin
- John Wittenberg – violin
- Susan Chatman – violin
- Michele Richards – violin
- Peter Kent – violin
- Sid Page – violin
- Sara Parkins – violin
- Margaret Wooten – violin
- Eve Butler – violin
- Ed Stein – violin
- Charlie Everett – violin
- Anatoly Rosinsky – violin
- Gerry Hilera – violin
- Bob Peterson – violin
- Ana Landauer – violin
- Denyse Buffum – principal viola
- Matt Funes – viola
- Simon Oswell – viola
- Darrin McCann – viola
- Kazi Pitelka – viola
- Larry Corbett – principal cello
- Dan Smith – cello
- Steve Richards – cello
- Rudy Stein – cello
- David Campbell – string arrangement, conducting
- Suzie Katayama – orchestra management

== Charts ==
Weekly chart performance for "Suddenly"
Chart (2003)	Peak position
Australia (ARIA)	53
Germany (GfK)	90
Netherlands (Single Top 100)	93
New Zealand (Recorded Music NZ)	24
Scotland Singles (Official Charts)	33
UK Singles (Official Charts)	47
US Hot Country Songs (Billboard)	43

== Release history ==
Release dates and formats for "Suddenly"
Region	Date	Format(s)	Label(s)	Ref.
United Kingdom	February 24, 2003	CD; cassette	Curb; London	
United States	March 10, 2003	Country radio	Curb	
Australia	April 14, 2003	CD	Curb	
