= Growing, Pains =

Studio album by Billie Myers
- Released: 18 November 1997
- Studios: The Gentlemen's Club (Miami Beach, Florida); Criteria (Miami, Florida); Deep River (Cookham, Berkshire, England); Abbey Road (London, England)
- Genre: Pop rock
- Length: 43:56 (standard version); 49:25 (DTS CD version)
- Label: Universal
- Producer: Desmond Child

Billie Myers chronology
Growing, Pains (1997)	Vertigo (2000)

Growing, Pains is the debut album by British singer-songwriter Billie Myers, released in 1997 by Universal Records. It includes the worldwide hit single "Kiss the Rain", which reached number four in the UK singles chart and number 15 on the US Billboard Hot 100, plus the follow-up single "Tell Me".

In addition to the regular CD, a DTS CD version was released, featuring a 5.1 surround sound mix of the entire album and an unplugged version of "Kiss the Rain" as a bonus track.

== Critical reception ==
Professional ratings
Review scores
Source	Rating
AllMusic	3/5 stars
Music Week	(favorable)

In a review for AllMusic, Alex Henderson wrote that "despite its excessive slickness and commercial leanings, this is an often impressive album that has a lot of heart" and that "[Myers'] passion and soulfulness come through loud and clear". He described Myers' "vocal style" as "a combination of Chrissie Hynde and Tracy Chapman with traces of Joan Armatrading and Joni Mitchell", and that it "never fails to be attractive."

== Track listing ==
No.	Title	Writer(s)	Length
1.	"Kiss the Rain"	Billie Myers; Desmond Child; Eric Bazilian	4:32
2.	"A Few Words Too Many"	Myers; Child	4:19
3.	"Tell Me"	Myers; David Austin	5:05
4.	"You Send Me Flying"	Myers; Peter Vale	3:58
5.	"Please Don't Shout"	Myers; Pete Q. Harris	3:44
6.	"First Time"	Myers; Jane Dobbins; George Hutchison	3:39
7.	"Mother, Daughter, Sister, Lover"	Myers; Vale	3:38/4:07
8.	"The Shark and the Mermaid"	Myers; Harris	3:49
9.	"Having Trouble with the Language"	Myers; Vale	3:45
10.	"Opposites Attract"	Myers; Hutchison	3:37
11.	"Much Change Too Soon"	Myers; Vale	3:50
Total length:			43:56

DTS CD bonus track
No.	Title	Writer(s)	Length
12.	"Kiss the Rain (unplugged)"	Myers; Child; Bazilian	5:00

Note

- The duration of the bonus track is 5 minutes long according to the CD's back cover, but the actual track features ~5 more minutes of a recorded thunderstorm after the song, bringing its entire running time to 9:55. Also, the DTS version of "Mother, Daughter, Sister, Lover" is ~30 seconds longer than the stereo version.

== Personnel ==
Adapted from the album's liner notes.

=== Musicians ===
- Billie Myers – vocals (all tracks), backing vocals (tracks 1, 3, 6, 9, 10)
- Mercedes Abal – flute (tracks 3, 8), machete (track 8)
- Kenny Aronoff – drums & percussion (tracks 1–10)
- Eric Bazilian – guitar (tracks 1, 9), bass guitar (track 1), drum programming (track 1), backing vocals (track 1), electric guitar (tracks 3–8), acoustic guitar (tracks 3, 5, 8), mandolin (track 7)
- Catherine Browning – violin (track 11)
- Randy Cantor – organ (track 1)
- Ramesh Chandra – sitar (track 3)
- Desmond Child – backing vocals (track 1), keyboards (track 3)
- Don Coffman – double bass
- Jane Dobbins – backing vocals (tracks 2–4, 6–10), backing vocal arrangement (tracks 6, 10), string programming (track 6)
- Alison Dodds – violin (track 11)
- Richard Drummie – electric guitar (track 2), acoustic guitar (track 2)
- Charles Dye – backing vocals (track 6)
- Doug Emery – keyboards (track 2), organ (track 9)
- Pete Q. Harris – piano (track 5), string programming & arrangement (track 4, 8, 10), string arrangement (track 11)
- George Hutchison – acoustic guitar (tracks 3, 4, 6–8), electric guitar (track 6), mandolin (track 6), guitar (track 10)
- Hugh McDonald – bass guitar (tracks 2, 4–10)
- Tom McWilliams – drum & percussion programming
- Andrea Morris – violin (tracks 8, 11)
- Eddie Montilla – keyboards (track 3), synth bass (track 3)
- Clare Raybould – violin (track 11)
- Lazaro Rodriguez – electric guitar (track 6)
- Arturo Sandoval – flugelhorn (track 11)
- Eliot Sloan – backing vocals (track 4)
- JR Swingha – drum programming (tracks 3, 9, 10)
- Peter Vale – acoustic guitar (tracks 4, 7), keyboards (track 7), backing vocals (tracks 4, 7, 9), backing vocal arrangement (tracks 4, 7), electric guitar (track 4), guitar (tracks 9, 11)
- Betty Wright – backing vocals (tracks 3, 8)

=== Technical ===
- Desmond Child – producer
- Brian Coleman – production manager
- Charles Dye – recording
- Andy Roshberg – additional recording
- Peter Vale – additional recording
- Pete Q. Harris – additional recording, programming (track 3)
- J. C. Ulloa – additional recording
- Cage Gondor – additional recording, assistant engineer
- Alex Marcou – additional recording
- Robert Valdez – assistant engineer
- Chris Carroll – assistant engineer
- David Flower – assistant engineer
- Alex Burak – assistant engineer
- Michael Brauer – mixing
- Ryan Hewitt – assistant mix engineer
- Greg Calbi – mastering
- Kathy Baylor – A&R
- Sandie Lee Drake – art direction
- Susan Bibeau – design
- Michael Halsband – photography
- Recorded at The Gentlemen's Club (Miami Beach, Florida)
- Additional recording at Criteria (Miami, Florida), Deep River (Cookham, Berkshire, England) & Abbey Road (London, England)

== Charts ==
=== Weekly charts ===
Weekly chart performance for Growing, Pains
Chart (1998)	Peak position
Canadian Albums (RPM)	54
Dutch Albums (Album Top 100)	61
European Albums Chart	91
New Zealand Albums (RIANZ)	21
Scottish Albums (OCC)	28
Swedish Albums (Sverigetopplistan)	28
UK Albums (OCC)	19
US Billboard 200	91

== Certifications ==
Certifications for Growing, Pains
Region	Certification	Certified units/sales
Canada (Music Canada)	Gold	50,000^{^}
^{^} Shipments figures based on certification alone.
