= Trouble or Nothin' =

Studio album by Robin Beck
- Released: 1989 (original), 2009 (Re-record)
- Recorded: 1987–89 (original), 08-09 (Re-record)
- Genre: Rock, pop rock
- Length: 39:23
- Label: Mercury (original), Her Majesty's Music Room (Re-record)
- Producer: Desmond Child (original), James Christian (Re-record)

Robin Beck chronology
Sweet Talk (1979)	Trouble or Nothin' (1989)	Human Instinct (1992)

Singles from Trouble or Nothin'
- 1. "First Time" Released: January 31, 1988 (US) October 14, 1988 (UK); 2. "Save Up All Your Tears" Released: February 27, 1989; 3. "Tears in the Rain" Released: 1989

Professional ratings
Review scores
Source	Rating
Allmusic	2/5 stars

Trouble or Nothin' is a 1989 album by female artist Robin Beck. It was produced by Desmond Child and recorded and mixed by Sir Arthur Payson. This album was re-recorded and released independently in 2009 as Trouble or Nothing: 20th Anniversary Edition because Universal Music Group refused to reissue, give license, or give her the master recording of the original. An additional four songs were recorded.

== Track listing ==
No.	Title	Writer(s)	Length
1.	"Hide Your Heart" (Bonnie Tyler cover)	Desmond Child, Holly Knight, Paul Stanley	4:03
2.	"Don't Lose Any Sleep" (John Waite cover)	Diane Warren	4:06
3.	"If You Were a Woman and I Was a Man" (Bonnie Tyler cover)	Child	4:03
4.	"Hold Back the Night"	Alice Cooper, Child	3:37
5.	"Save Up All Your Tears" (Bonnie Tyler cover)	Warren, Child	4:05
6.	"In a Crazy World Like This" (Pat Benatar cover)	Neil Giraldo, Tom Kelly, Billy Steinberg	3:56
7.	"Tears in the Rain"	Warren, Child	4:42
8.	"A Heart for You"	Robin Beck, Jeff Kent, Terry Cox	4:13
9.	"Sleeping with the Enemy"	Beck, Kent	3:35
10.	"First Time"	music: Gavin Spencer; lyrics: Terry Boyle, Tom Anthony	3:16

== Personnel ==
- Robin Beck - lead vocals
- Guy Mann-Dude, John McCurry, Steve Lukather, Ira Siegel, Jeff Mironov - guitar
- Hugh McDonald, Seth Glassman - bass
- Gregg Mangiafico, Chuck Kentis, Robbie Kondor - keyboards
- David Garfield - additional keyboards
- Bobby Chouinard, Gavin Spencer, Steve Ferrone - drums
- Alan St. Jon - organ on "Save Up All Your Tears"
- Brandon Fields - saxophone on "If You Were a Woman (And I Was a Man)"
- Brad Parker, Guy Mann-Dude, Paul Stanley, Richard T. Bear - gang vocals on "Save Up All Your Tears"

== Charts ==
Chart positions for Trouble or Nothin
Chart	Peak
German Albums (Offizielle Top 100)	18
Swedish Albums (Sverigetopplistan)	23
Swiss Albums (Schweizer Hitparade)	16
