= Twisted Angel =

2002 studio album by LeAnn Rimes

Studio album by LeAnn Rimes
- Released: October 1, 2002
- Recorded: 1999–2002
- Studio: Henson (Hollywood); Conway (Hollywood); Cello (Hollywood); 1023 (Hollywood); Goodnight LA (Van Nuys); Sound Image (Van Nuys); West Lake (Los Angeles); Larrabee East (Los Angeles); The Enterprise (Burbank); The Gentlemen's Club (Miami Beach); Abbey Road (London)
- Genre: Pop; techno; hip hop
- Length: 51:04
- Label: Curb
- Producer: Peter Amato; Desmond Child; Gregg Pagani; LeAnn Rimes

LeAnn Rimes chronology
God Bless America (2001)	Twisted Angel (2002)	Greatest Hits (2003)

Singles from Twisted Angel
- 1. "Life Goes On" Released: August 5, 2002; 2. "Tic Toc" Released: November 11, 2002; 3. "Suddenly" Released: February 18, 2003

Twisted Angel is the seventh studio album by American country pop artist LeAnn Rimes, released in the United States on October 1, 2002, by Curb Records. After a legal battle with Curb and her father, Wilbur C. Rimes, she re-signed with the label. Unlike the country albums that popularized her, Twisted Angel is a pop album with influences of hip hop, techno, and rock; it was her attempt at a pop crossover album, similar to Faith Hill's Cry, which was released two weeks later. Rimes began recording the album in 1999, describing it as an exploration of more adult sounds and themes. As Twisted Angel was her first album recorded without her father's involvement, she co-wrote four of the album's 13 tracks and co-produced the record with Desmond Child, Peter Amato, and Gregg Pagani.

Three singles were released, all of which failed to match the success of her previous releases in the United States. "Life Goes On", released on August 5, 2002, as the album's lead single, peaked within the top ten in Australia, Canada, the Netherlands, and Sweden, but did not chart on the Billboard Hot 100; it peaked at number 9 on the Adult Contemporary chart. The second single, "Tic Toc", only charted on the Dance Club Songs chart, where it peaked at number 10. "Suddenly", the third and final single, only entered the top forty in New Zealand and peaked at number 43 on the Hot Country Songs chart.

Upon release, Twisted Angel received mixed reviews from music critics, with most criticizing her move to pop. Rimes's core-country fanbase was reportedly ambivalent toward the album due to its more pop direction. Commercially, it was not as successful as her previous releases. It debuted at number 12 on the Billboard 200, becoming her first album to miss the top ten. Internationally, it only entered the top ten in New Zealand. The album was certified Gold by the RIAA for sales of 500,000 copies in the United States. Despite the album's disappointing critical and commercial performance, Rimes has stated that she does not regret the album and the move to a different genre.

== Background ==
After re-signing her contract with Curb Records, Rimes began work recording songs for Twisted Angel for three years. It is the first album she would do under her new management, and the first where she assumed a direct role as producer. Before the album came out, Rimes said about the title: "The 'Angel' is that little girl with the big voice who grew up with everyone watching her. The 'Twisted' part is me growing into my own as a strong woman." When it was released, Twisted Angel's sales were donated to the Amie Karen Cancer Fund for Children, based at Cedars-Sinai Medical Center in Los Angeles. The song "You Made Me Find Myself" was originally written and recorded by Australian artist Tina Arena on her fifth studio album Just Me (2001). "Review My Kisses" was later covered by Belgian/Italian artist Lara Fabian on her second English-language studio album A Wonderful Life (2004).

== Singles ==
Three singles were released from the album. "Life Goes On" was released as the lead single from the album on August 26, 2002. Holly George-Warren of Entertainment Weekly claimed the song would "probably go on to number one on the pop chart." The song peaked at number nine on the Adult Contemporary chart, thirty-five on the Pop Songs chart, twenty-eight on the Adult Pop Songs and sixty on the Country Songs chart in the US.

The second single, "Tic Toc", was released to US pop radio on November 11, 2002. The song peaked at number ten on Billboard's Dance Club Songs chart.

The third and final single, "Suddenly", was released internationally on February 18, 2003. The song peaked at forty-three on the Country song chart in the US.

== Critical reception ==
Professional ratings
Aggregate scores
Source	Rating
Metacritic	51/100
Review scores
Source	Rating
AllMusic	2.5/5 stars
Blender	3/5 stars
Entertainment Weekly	C+
MTV Asia	5/10
Q	2/5 stars
Rolling Stone	2/5 stars
New Straits Times	2/5 stars

The album was met with mixed reviews by music critics, being rated by Metacritic a score of 51 out of 100. Billboard praised Rimes for her vocal prowess, noting that while upbeat tracks like "Trouble With Goodbye" and "Wound Up" showcased style and energy, her ballads and midtempo songs such as "The Safest Place" and "Suddenly" highlighted her mastery of tone and range." The Lakeland Ledger gave a mostly favorable review, stating that Rimes' "balladeering backgrounds and impassioned vocals are intact, just slicker – like Kelly Clarkson with a twang," and added that "'Angel' may not be Rimes' Nashville Skyline, but it could be her Blonde on Blonde. Maybe." Stephen Thomas Erlewine of AllMusic gave a mixed review, praising Rimes's transition to pop but criticizing the uneven songwriting, dated production, and overly sexualized image, and suggested she might struggle to connect with her older audience.

Chili Paddy from MTV Asia described Twisted Angel as slick, middle-of-the-road adult pop, noting Rimes's powerful voice and highlights like "Life Goes On" and "Suddenly." However, he criticized the album for too many forgettable songs and safe pop production, suggesting that Rimes risks alienating her country fans while failing to make a strong impact in mainstream pop. Jon Caramanica of Entertainment Weekly on the other hand gave the album a C+, stating that Rimes "desperately wants to play with the bad girls" and concluded by writing "Someone unbreak her heart, please." Dave Gil de Rubio of Barnes & Noble.com stated that Rimes is "moving farther from her country music roots with a set of songs closer in spirit to junior divas Britney and Christina." In a review for Rolling Stone, Caramanica gave the album two out of five stars and stated, "Rimes, who got her start aping Patsy Cline, slaps her throaty drawl over hip-hop lite beats Jessica Simpson wouldn't touch, and a succession of mushy love songs don't help. With golden pipes and white-bread good looks, she could succeed Celine Dion as North America's ranking pop balladeer; in the meantime let's hope Nashville will take her back, and quick." R.S. Murthl of New Straits Times gave a mostly unfavorable review, ending it by saying "the by-the-numbers approach to song selection and production diminishes whatever pleasure you may derive from these tunes."

== Track listing ==
No.	Title	Writer(s)	Length
1.	"Life Goes On"	Andreas Carlsson; Desmond Child; LeAnn Rimes	3:33
2.	"Wound Up"	Gary Burr; Greg Pagani; Rimes	4:15
3.	"The Safest Place"	Eric Bazilian; Child; Mark Hudson; Victoria Shaw	3:52
4.	"Trouble with Goodbye"	Pete Amato; Randy Cantor; Shelly Peiken	3:22
5.	"Damn"	Ty Lacy; Holly Lamar; Dennis Matkosky	3:29
6.	"Suddenly"	Carlsson; Child	3:58
7.	"Tic Toc"	Amato; Pagani; Christina Rumbley	3:40
8.	"Sign of Life"	Burr; Child; Pagani	4:28
9.	"Review My Kisses"	Child; Marie Wilson	5:31
10.	"No Way Out"	Austin Deptula; Gary Leach; Rimes	3:55
11.	"Love Is an Army"	Child; Gyan Evans	4:01
12.	"You Made Me Find Myself"	Tina Arena; Child; Lacy	3:39
13.	"Twisted Angel"	Leach; Rimes	3:21
Total length:			51:04

Australian limited edition bonus disc
No.	Title	Writer(s)	Length
1.	"Can't Fight the Moonlight"	Diane Warren	3:35
2.	"Life Goes On" (Amato/Pagani Country Mix)	Carlsson; Child; Rimes	3:38
3.	"Life Goes On" (Almighty Mix)	Carlsson; Child; Rimes	3:46
4.	"Life Goes On" (Peter Amato Mix)	Carlsson; Child; Rimes	3:21
5.	"Life Goes On" (M*A*S*H Mix)	Carlsson; Child; Rimes	8:07
6.	"Life Goes On" (29 Palms Transgressive Mix)	Carlsson; Child; Rimes	8:58
Total length:			31:25

== Credits and personnel ==
Credits for Twisted Angel were adapted from liner notes.

- LeAnn Rimes – lead vocals, backing vocals (1, 3–7, 9, 13)
- Peter Amato – keyboards (1–10, 12, 13), programming (1–10, 12, 13), arrangements (1–10, 12, 13)
- Gregg Pagani – keyboards (1–10, 12, 13), programming (1–10, 12, 13), arrangements (1–10, 12, 13)
- Michael Norfleet – acoustic piano (9, 12)
- Peter Cobbin – acoustic piano (11), programming (11)
- Michael Landau – guitars (1, 2, 4, 8, 10)
- Eric Jackson – acoustic guitar (2)
- Corky James – guitars (3, 5, 6, 13), bass (6)
- Michael Thompson – guitars (3, 7, 9, 12)
- Gary Leach – guitars (10)
- Robbie Nevil – guitars (13)
- Abraham Laboriel – bass (1, 2, 10)
- Leland Sklar – bass (3, 5, 12)
- Andreas Carlsson – bass (6), backing vocals (6)
- Zev Katz – acoustic bass (11)
- Jonathon Schwartz – acoustic bass (11)
- Abe Laboriel Jr. – drums (1, 2, 10)
- Steve Ferrone – drums (3, 5, 6)
- Vinnie Colaiuta – drums (12)
- Luis Conte – percussion (3, 9)
- DJ Mega Man – scratches (2, 10)
- Sherree Ford – backing vocals (1, 2, 4, 7, 8, 10), BGV arrangements (1, 2, 4, 7, 8, 10)
- Nora Payne – backing vocals (1)
- Sue Ann Carwell – backing vocals (3, 5, 9, 12), BGV arrangements (3, 5, 9, 12)
- Jeanette Olsson – backing vocals (6)
- Gyan Evans – backing vocals (11)*

Orchestra (Tracks 3, 5–9 & 12)

- David Campbell – conductor, French horn arrangements (3, 8), string arrangements (3, 5–9, 12), timpani arrangements (3, 12), harp arrangements (7–9), woodwind arrangements (9)
- Suzie Katayama – orchestra manager
- Joe Meyer – French horn (3, 8)
- Jon Clarke – alto flute (9), oboe (9)
- Brad Dutz – timpani (3, 12)
- Larry Corbett – principle cello (3, 5–9, 12)
- Daniel Smith – cello (3, 5–9, 12)
- Steve Richards – cello (6, 8, 9)
- Rudy Stein – cello (6, 8, 9)
- Stephanie Bennett – harp (7–9)
- Denyse Buffum – principle viola (3, 6–9)
- Matt Funes – viola (3, 6–9, 12)
- Darrin McCann – viola (6, 8, 9)
- Simon Oswell – viola (6, 8, 9)
- Kazi Pitelka – viola (6, 8, 9, 12)
- Charlie Bisharat – violin (3, 5–9, 12)
- Susan Chatman – violin (3, 6–9)
- Joel Derouin – violin (3, 5–9, 12), concertmaster (3, 5–9, 12)
- Peter Kent – violin (3, 5–9, 12)
- Sid Page – violin (3, 6–8, 12)
- Sara Parkins – violin (3, 5–9, 12)
- Michelle Richards – violin (3, 5–9, 12)
- John Wittenberg – violin (3, 6–9, 12)
- Berj Garabedian – violin (5, 8, 9, 12)
- Eve Butler – violin (6, 8, 9)
- Charlie Everett – violin (6, 8, 9)
- Gerry Hilera – violin (6, 8)
- Ana Landauer – violin (6, 8, 9)
- Bob Peterson – violin (6, 8, 9)
- Anatoly Rosinski – violin (6, 8, 9)
- Ed Stein – violin (6, 8, 9)
- Margaret Wooten – violin (6, 8, 9)

String quintet on "Love Is an Army"

- David Campbell – arrangements
- Mary Scully – bass
- Anthony Pleeth – cello
- Philip Dukes – viola
- Pat Kiernan – violin
- Gavyn Wright – principle violin

=== Production ===
- LeAnn Rimes – executive producer
- Desmond Child – producer
- Peter Amato – producer (1–10, 12, 13)
- Gregg Pagani – producer (1–10, 12, 13)
- Brian Coleman – production manager
- John Coulter Design – graphic design
- Photonica – angel photography
- Dah Len – photography
- Ellen Von Unworth – photography
- Renato Campora – hair
- Robert Vetica – hair
- Jo Strettell – make-up
- John Wright – make-up
- Jessica Paster – stylist
- Tom Ross and Clarice Cascio for Tom Ross Artist Careers – management

Technical credits

- Bernie Grundman – mastering at Bernie Grundman Mastering (Hollywood, California)
- Peter Amato – recording
- Chris Brooke – recording
- Rob Chairelli – recording, lead vocal mixing, mixing (1, 5, 6, 8, 10, 13)
- Steve Churchyard – recording, string recording (5)
- Peter Cobbin – recording, string recording (11), mixing (11)
- Jules Gondar – recording
- Matt Gruber – recording
- Matt Lavalla – recording
- Gregg Pagani – recording
- Manny Marroquin – mixing (2–4, 7, 9)
- Humberto Gatica – string recording (3, 6–9, 12), timpani recording (3, 12)
- Chandler Bridges – additional engineer
- Conrad Golding – additional engineer, assistant engineer
- Dino Herrmann – additional engineer
- Craig Lozowick – additional engineer
- Bill Malina – additional engineer
- Nathan Malki – additional engineer
- Gareth Bowser – assistant engineer
- Chris Clark – assistant engineer, assistant mix engineer
- Michelle Forbes – assistant mix engineer
- Alex Gibson – assistant engineer
- Brian Humphrey – assistant engineer
- Greg Landon – assistant engineer
- John Morrical – assistant engineer
- Pete Novak – assistant mix engineer
- Charlie Paakkari – assistant engineer
- Alan Sanderson – assistant engineer
- Rebeka Tuinei – assistant engineer
- Jennifer Young – assistant engineer

== Charts ==
Twisted Angel debuted at #12 on Billboard 200 with 61,398 copies sold in its 1st week, it fell by 47% with 32,619 copies sold in its 2nd week. and a 14% decrease in its 3rd with 28,176 copies sold.

=== Weekly charts ===
Chart (2002–03)	Peak position
Australian Albums (ARIA)	21
Austrian Albums (Ö3 Austria)	64
Danish Albums (Hitlisten)	35
Dutch Albums (Album Top 100)	39
European Albums (European Top 100 Albums)	28
German Albums (Offizielle Top 100)	33
Finnish Albums (Suomen virallinen lista)	39
Irish Albums (IRMA)	57
Japanese Albums (Oricon)	92
New Zealand Albums (RMNZ)	5
Norwegian Albums (VG-lista)	22
Swedish Albums (Sverigetopplistan)	29
Swiss Albums (Schweizer Hitparade)	18
UK Albums (Official Charts)	14
US Billboard 200	12
US Top Country Albums (Billboard)	3

=== Year-end charts ===
Year-end chart performance for Twisted Angel
Chart (2002)	Position
Canadian Albums (Nielsen SoundScan)	168
Canadian Country Albums (Nielsen SoundScan)	10
US Top Country Albums (Billboard)	45
Chart (2003)	Position
New Zealand Albums Chart	37
US Billboard Top Country Albums	44

== Certifications ==
Certifications and sales for Twisted Angel
Region	Certification	Certified units/sales
Australia (ARIA)	Gold	35,000^{^}
Canada (Music Canada)	Gold	50,000^{^}
Korea	—	20,610
New Zealand (RMNZ)	Gold	7,500^{^}
United Kingdom (BPI)	Silver	60,000^{^}
United States (RIAA)	Gold	500,000
^{^} Shipments figures based on certification alone.

== Release history ==
Country	Date	Label	Format	Catalog	Ref.
United States	October 1, 2002	Curb Records	CD	D2-78747	
Brazil	October 1, 2002	Warlock Records	CD	5050466093127	
United Kingdom	October 14, 2002	Curb Records	CD	5046611562	
Australia	October 28, 2002	Curb Records	CD	5098059000	
