= Sunblock (band) =

Swedish band

- Origin: Sweden
- Genres: Electronica, house
- Years active: 2005–2007
- Members: Martin Pihl; Magnus Nordin

Sunblock were a Swedish electronic production group, consisting of Martin Pihl and Magnus Nordin, with dancers Oksana Andersson, Rebecca Simonsson and Pernilla Lundberg being the focal point of the group.

== Musical career ==
The group remixed the Baywatch official theme "I'm Always Here", released as "I'll Be Ready" in 2006. It reached number four on the UK Singles Chart.

Their second single, "First Time", is a remix of the 1988 hit song by Robin Beck. The original song featured on Coca-Cola adverts in the late 1980s. It reached number nine on the UK Singles Chart.

Sunblock's third single is a cover of a 1995 single by Corona called "Baby Baby" and features the original singer, Sandy Chambers.

== Discography ==
=== Albums ===
- I'll Be Ready: The Album (2006)

=== Singles ===
List of singles, with selected chart positions
Title	Year	Chart positions								Album
Title	Year	SWE	AUS	AUT	DEN	FIN	IRL	NED	UK	Album
"I'll Be Ready"	2006	12	32	36	8	—	7	29	4	I'll Be Ready: The Album
"First Time" (featuring Robin Beck)	2006	32	—	—	—	6	10	48	9	I'll Be Ready: The Album
"Baby Baby" (featuring Sandy)	2007	13	—	—	—	4	18	99	16	Non-album single
