= Save Up All Your Tears =

1988 single by Bonnie Tyler

Single by Bonnie Tyler

from the album Hide Your Heart (Notes From America)
- B-side: "It's Not Enough"
- Released: 15 August 1988
- Recorded: Bearsville Studios and The Hit Factory, New York
- Genre: Soft rock
- Length: 4:24 (album version); 4:20 (the London mix)
- Label: Columbia; CBS
- Songwriters: Desmond Child; Diane Warren
- Producer: Desmond Child

Bonnie Tyler singles chronology
"Hide Your Heart" (1988)	"Save Up All Your Tears" (1988)	"Don't Turn Around" (1988)

"Save Up All Your Tears" is a song written by Desmond Child and Diane Warren, and originally released by Welsh singer Bonnie Tyler. The song was subsequently covered by other artists including Robin Beck, Cher, Freda Payne and Bonfire.

The original Bonnie Tyler version of the song was featured on the album called Notes From America in the United States, Canada and Brazil and entitled Hide Your Heart throughout the rest of the world. The song was produced by its co-writer, Desmond Child, who was enjoying chart success in the US with singles by Bon Jovi including "Livin' on a Prayer". The single, released in 1988, did not approach the success of previous releases like "Total Eclipse of the Heart" and "Holding Out for a Hero", and charted only on airplay charts in Europe. A version called The London Mix was mixed by Desmond Child.

== Robin Beck version ==
"Save Up All Your Tears"

Single by Robin Beck

from the album Trouble Or Nothin'
- B-side: "Jealous Hearts" (7", Mini CD); "Jealous Hearts", "First Time" (12", CD single)
- Released: 27 February 1989
- Recorded: Bearsville Studios, New York
- Genre: Soft rock
- Length: 4:05
- Label: Mercury; Polygram; Phonogram Records
- Songwriters: Desmond Child; Diane Warren
- Producer: Desmond Child

Robin Beck singles chronology
"First Time" (1988)	"Save Up All Your Tears" (1989)	"Tears in the Rain" (1989)

In 1989, American singer Robin Beck included her version on her second album, Trouble Or Nothin' (1989). As with Bonnie Tyler's original recording, the Beck version was produced by the song's co-writer, Desmond Child. Beck's version featured KISS' Paul Stanley on background vocals. Beck's single was the follow-up single to her European #1 breakout hit "First Time". While not the smash of that song, "Save Up All Your Tears" was a significant hit for Beck in West Germany and Switzerland, where it went to #10 and #5 respectively, and was also a success in Sweden and Austria. A video was made for the single (which features UFO guitarist Laurence Archer) although it received some video airplay on MTV and radio airplay in the US (whilst also making it on a top 40 station in St. Louis) and UK, it failed to garner any national success in the United States to chart on any Billboard charts and was only a minor hit in the United Kingdom.

=== Charts ===
Chart (1989)	Peak position
Austria (Ö3 Austria Top 40)	27
Europe (European Hot 100 Singles)	35
Sweden (Sverigetopplistan)	17
Switzerland (Swiss Hitparade)	5
UK Singles (OCC)	84
West Germany (Official German Charts)	10

== Cher version ==
"Save Up All Your Tears"

Single by Cher

from the album Love Hurts
- B-side: "A World Without Heroes"
- Released: 7 October 1991
- Recorded: 1991
- Genre: Pop rock; soft rock
- Length: 4:03
- Label: Geffen
- Songwriters: Desmond Child; Diane Warren
- Producers: Richie Zito; Bob Rock

Cher singles chronology
"Love and Understanding" (1991)	"Save Up All Your Tears" (1991)	"Love Hurts" (1991)

Music video
- "Save Up All Your Tears" on YouTube

In 1991, American singer and actress Cher released a cover of the song as the second US and third European single from her 20th album, Love Hurts (1991). While Beck was the only artist to take the song top ten, Cher's version of the song did the best in the US and the UK, cracking the top 40 to peak at #37 in both markets.

=== Critical reception ===
"Save Up All Your Tears"
A 30 second sample of "Save Up All Your Tears", a pop rock song with influences of rock subgenres that lyrically, revolves around a theme of empowerment.

Joseph McCombs from AllMusic highlighted the song and called it "pleasantly melodic." Larry Flick from Billboard magazine commented, "Rousing, guitar-driven pop/rocker should have ushered in media icon's current Love Hurts opus. Song's unshakable hook and Cher's aggressive vocal are a perfect top 40 radio marriage. Sounds like a well-deserved smash." A reviewer from Cashbox wrote, "The ever-cosmetically changing Cher, belts out this single of her confidence in an ex-lover's fate of crying over dumping her. It wouldn't be surprising if he just didn't recognize her. With her hair now red, and freshly inflated lips, if it hadn't been for the tattoos and her name on the single, I wouldn't have recognized her either. The voice though, is easily recognizable, vintage Cher all the way."

=== Promotion and performances ===
Cher performed the song live in Dame Edna's TV Show and in David Letterman's Late Night Show. During Cher's ABC Coca-Cola Concert Special, as a part of the promotional campaign for her album, she also performed the song live—even though she actually lip-synched. This special was taped in a studio; Cher lip-synched to four songs of her latest album and had her band play along.

=== Music video ===
Cher's music video for "Save Up All Your Tears" was rather racy, but not as racy as its predecessor "If I Could Turn Back Time". In the video Cher sports three different wigs as well as three different outfits. She first wears a light pink lingerie nighty and a large red curly wig and next another skimpy black lingerie outfit with a dark brown curly wig. The final outfit she wears was one of her most extravagant to date, a dominatrix-themed black leather and chain top, with fishnet stockings and leather nets for sleeves, accompanied by Cher's signature long straight black hair. Twice during the video she turns around to display that she is wearing a thong which reveals a rather large tattoo across her backside. A photograph of this outfit taken by Herb Ritts would be used for the poster for her Love Hurts Tour. Under the banner of "Cher's Back!" with this buttock-revealing poster Cher performed several dates in Europe during her Love Hurts Tour. Later she also performs the song during the rehearsal for her Farewell Tour, this performance is available only as a Bonus Material in the DVD of the show.

=== Charts ===
Chart (1991–1992)	Peak position
Australia (ARIA)	114
Austria (Ö3 Austria Top 40)	18
Canada Top Singles (RPM)	32
Canada Adult Contemporary (RPM)	16
Europe (Eurochart Hot 100)	76
Europe (European Hit Radio)	18
Germany (Official German Charts)	56
Israel (IBA)	23
Ireland (IRMA)	30
UK Airplay (Music Week)	4
UK Singles (Official Charts)	37
US Billboard Hot 100	37
US Adult Contemporary (Billboard)	16
US Cash Box Top 100	27

=== Track listing ===
- US and European 7" and cassette single
1. "Save Up All Your Tears" – 4:00
2. "A World Without Heroes" – 3:09
- European 12" and CD single
1. "Save Up All Your Tears" – 4:00
2. "A World Without Heroes" – 3:09
3. "Love and Understanding" (12" Dance Mix) – 5:25

== Personnel ==
- Keith Scott: Guitars
- John Webster: Keyboards
- Hugh McDonald: Bass
- Mickey Curry: Drums
- Jim McGilveray: Percussion
- Marc France, David Steele, David Steele, Joanie Bye, Connie Scott, Richard Page, Lisa Dal Bello, Steve George: Backing vocals

== Production ==
- Arranged by Howie Vickers
- Produced by Bob Rock and Richie Zito
- Recorded by Mike Fraser
- Mixed by David Thoener
- Additional recording and mixing by Randy Staub, David Thoener and Phil Kaffel
