= Kiss the Rain =

1997 single by Billie Myers

- Artwork used for American, Australian, and non-UK European releases

Single by Billie Myers

from the album Growing, Pains
- B-side: "Sleeping Beauty"
- Released: 25 August 1997
- Genre: Pop rock; soft rock
- Length: 4:30
- Label: Universal
- Songwriters: Billie Myers; Eric Bazilian; Desmond Child
- Producer: Desmond Child

Billie Myers singles chronology
"Kiss the Rain" (1997)	"Tell Me" (1998)

Music video
- "Kiss the Rain" (European version) on YouTube

"Kiss the Rain" is a song by British singer-songwriter Billie Myers from her debut album, Growing, Pains (1997). Produced by Desmond Child, the song was released on 25 August 1997 as the lead single from the album by Universal Records. Myers co-wrote it with Child and Eric Bazilian, and also recorded a Spanish version titled "Besa la lluvia (Piensa en mí)" ("Kiss the Rain (Think of Me)"). The song charted at number four on the UK Singles Chart and became an international hit, reaching number two in Canada and number 15 on the US Billboard Hot 100. There are two different versions of the music video for the song.

== Background ==
Desmond Child, who produced the album, got the idea for the title after hearing the Bush song "Glycerine". Child misheard the title as "Kiss the Rain". When he was told the correct title, he decided to use "Kiss the Rain" for a future song. While he was working out at the gym with Jon Bon Jovi, Child excitedly telling the singer that "Kiss the Rain" was a great tune with a great title — only to be told that he had totally whiffed on the name of the song. Child thought the misheard lyric made for an "incredibly fresh" title and asked Bon Jovi if he wanted to write a song called "Kiss the Rain." But since Bon Jovi thought the idea was "stupid," Child decided to save it for Myers, whom he was already working with at the time.

== Critical reception ==
Larry Flick from Billboard magazine wrote, "The gripping, acoustic sounds of the track's mood-setting guitar makes the palpable echoes of Billie Myers' voice really stand out." He noted further, "In fact, the chaotic, ever-sure echo full of Myers' emotions charmingly reaches the audience and has a lasting effect. The drum beats wonderfully complement the compelling guitar sounds. This wonderful single [...] is full of depth, emotion, and musical clarity". Joe Jackson from Irish Times noted "her witty, slightly left-of-field lyrics."

A reviewer from Music Week said, "It's easy to see the crossover appeal of Billie Myers. She's successfully married her distinctive soulful voice and strong presence to a trendy soft-rock backing. The song has a strong chorus, but if anything is a little formulaic." In a separate review, the magazine also complimented its "melancholic beauty". Gerald Martinez from New Sunday Times stated that "her arresting voice immediately makes the song a bit special." He described it as "a song of jealousy and insecurity and vulnerability, over a long-distance lover."

== Music video ==
There were two different music videos produced for "Kiss the Rain"; one for the US market, directed by Matt Mahurin, and another for the European market, directed by David Betteridge. Myers told in an interview, "I wasn't entirely happy with the American video and didn't feel it was quite right for Europe. When you work with some video directors they forget that when someone writes a song they have a vision. The new European promo reflects the real me far more accurately."

== Track listings ==
- UK CD single
1. "Kiss the Rain" (radio edit) – 4:09
2. "Kiss the Rain" (album version) – 4:30
3. "Kiss the Rain" (unplugged) – 7:23
4. "Sleeping Beauty" – 3:57
- UK cassette single
1. "Kiss the Rain" (radio edit) – 4:09
2. "Kiss the Rain" (album version) – 4:30
- US 7-inch single

A. "Kiss the Rain"
B. "Tell Me"

- US, Australian, and Japanese CD single
1. "Kiss the Rain"
2. "The Shark and the Mermaid"
- Italian 12-inch maxi-single

A1. "Kiss the Rain" (dance mix) – 5:28
A2. "Kiss the Rain" (radio mix) – 3:52
A3. "Kiss the Rain" (original version) – 4:30
B1. "Kiss the Rain" (TP2K club remix) – 7:52
B2. "Kiss the Rain" (Urban Discharge Trippy dub) – 7:55

== Personnel ==
Personnel are adapted from the US CD single liner notes.

- Billie Myers – vocals, background vocals, writing
- Eric Bazilian – background vocals, guitar, bass, keyboards, drum programming, writing
- Desmond Child – background vocals, writing
- Randy Cantor – organ
- Kenny Aronoff – drums and percussion

== Charts ==
=== Weekly charts ===
Chart (1997–1998)	Peak position
Australia (ARIA)	41
Canada Top Singles (RPM)	2
Canada Adult Contemporary (RPM)	6
Estonia (Eesti Top 20)	5
Europe (Eurochart Hot 100)	24
Europe (European Hit Radio)	7
Germany (GfK)	97
Iceland (Íslenski Listinn Topp 40)	20
Ireland (IRMA)	10
Italy (Musica e dischi)	12
Italy Airplay (Music & Media)	2
Netherlands (Dutch Top 40 Tipparade)	4
Netherlands (Single Top 100)	53
Netherlands Airplay (Music & Media)	14
Scottish Singles Sales (Official Charts)	5
Spain Airplay (Top 40 Radio)	10
Sweden (Sverigetopplistan)	15
UK Singles (Official Charts)	4
UK Airplay (Music Week)	2
US Billboard Hot 100	15
US Adult Contemporary (Billboard)	28
US Adult Pop Airplay (Billboard)	6
US Pop Airplay (Billboard)	7

=== Year-end charts ===
Chart (1998)	Position
Canada Top Singles (RPM)	22
Canada Adult Contemporary (RPM)	28
UK Singles (OCC)	87
UK Airplay (Music Week)	35
US Billboard Hot 100	46
US Adult Top 40 (Billboard)	27
US Mainstream Top 40 (Billboard)	33

== Certifications ==
Region	Certification	Certified units/sales
United Kingdom (BPI)	Silver	200,000^{^}
^{^} Shipments figures based on certification alone.

== Release history ==
Region	Date	Format(s)	Label(s)	Ref(s).
United States	25 August 1997	Alternative radio	Universal; Deston	
United States	26 August 1997	Contemporary hit radio	Universal; Deston	
United States	23 September 1997	CD; cassette	Universal; Deston	
Japan	21 February 1998	CD	Universal	
United Kingdom	30 March 1998	CD; cassette	Universal; Deston	
