= First Time (Robin Beck song) =

1988 single by Robin Beck

Single by Robin Beck

from the album Trouble or Nothin'
- B-side: "Sleeping with the Enemy"
- Released: July 1, 1988
- Genre: Rock
- Length: 3:17
- Label: Mercury, Metronome
- Songwriters: Gavin Spencer, Tom Anthony, Terry Boyle
- Producers: Gavin Spencer, Tom Anthony

Robin Beck singles chronology
"Sweet Talk" (1979)	"First Time" (1988)	"Save Up All Your Tears" (1989)

"First Time" is a song by American singer Robin Beck from her second album, Trouble or Nothin' (1989). The song was released as a single in July 1988 and was originally recorded for a Coca-Cola commercial. The power ballad spent three weeks at No. 1 on the UK Singles Chart and additionally reached number one in Austria, Greece, Ireland, the Netherlands, Norway, Switzerland, and West Germany. Despite being released as a single in the United States and being critically praised by Billboard, it failed to chart due to business political differences between Mercury Records and Coca-Cola wanting to promote either "First Time" or "Save Up All Your Tears", according to Beck's interview with Rock Eyez in 2009.

== Critical reception ==
Bill Coleman from Billboard wrote, "Fledgling rock vixen takes another shot at radio approval with this well-sung power ballad."

== Music video ==
There were two (completely different) professionally filmed music videos for the single. One is almost exclusively performance footage of Beck and her band, shot in a style used by many hair metal acts of the late 1980s. The other version is a "concept" video: At the beginning, Beck is seen in her bathroom, applying mascara and checking her hair, then makes a quick phone call. She goes through her apartment with scenes of her with her boyfriend. She looks out of a window before watching television (more scenes of her with her boyfriend). She flips through a magazine on the mantelpiece (more scenes), then makes another phone call. At the end of the video, the doorbell rings. Beck turns the television off and answers the door, but the person behind the door cannot be seen.

== Track listings ==
7-inch single

1. "First Time" – 3:17
2. "First Time" (instrumental) – 3:18

12-inch and CD single

1. "First Time" (remix) – 3:18
2. "First Time" (7-inch version) – 3:17
3. "First Time" (instrumental) – 3:18

Cassette single

1. "First Time" – 3:18
2. "Sleeping with the Enemy" – 3:35

== Charts ==
=== Weekly charts ===
Chart (1988–1989)	Peak position
Australia (ARIA)	148
Austria (Ö3 Austria Top 40)	1
Belgium (Ultratop 50 Flanders)	1
Denmark (IFPI)	4
Europe (European Hot 100 Singles)	1
Finland (Suomen virallinen lista)	3
France (SNEP)	4
Greece (IFPI)	1
Ireland (IRMA)	1
Italy Airplay (Music & Media)	1
Netherlands (Dutch Top 40)	1
Netherlands (Single Top 100)	1
New Zealand (Recorded Music NZ)	43
Norway (VG-lista)	1
Spain (AFYVE)	2
Sweden (Sverigetopplistan)	2
Switzerland (Schweizer Hitparade)	1
UK Singles (Official Charts)	1
West Germany (GfK)	1

=== Year-end charts ===
Chart (1988)	Position
UK Singles (OCC)	12

Chart (1989)	Position
Austria (Ö3 Austria Top 40)	12
Belgium (Ultratop)	39
Europe (Eurochart Hot 100)	9
Netherlands (Dutch Top 40)	67
Netherlands (Single Top 100)	85
Switzerland (Schweizer Hitparade)	3
West Germany (Media Control)	3

== Certifications ==
Region	Certification	Certified units/sales
France (SNEP)	Silver	200,000^{*}
Germany (BVMI)	Platinum	500,000^{^}
Switzerland (IFPI Switzerland)	Gold	25,000^{^}
United Kingdom (BPI)	Silver	250,000^{^}
^{*} Sales figures based on certification alone.^{^} Shipments figures based on certification alone.

== Cover versions ==
The song was covered in Spanish for the Latin American Coca-Cola campaign by Mexican singer Rocío Banquells, under the title "Primera Vez", released on her album En El Alambre.

In 1999, Polish singer Kasia Kowalska recorded a Polish-language version of the song for the Polish Coca-Cola campaign, under the title "Chcę zatrzymać ten czas". Polish singer Margaret also recorded her version of the song titled "Smak radości" for the Polish Coca-Cola commercial. It was released as a digital download on April 16, 2015.

=== Unique version ===
In 2003, the song was covered by Unique which achieved minor success in Switzerland.

==== Track listing ====
CD maxi

1. "First Time" (radio edit djs@work RMX) — 3:12
2. "First Time" (video mix free power mix) — 3:48
3. "First Time" (club mix Patrick Bnton RMX) — 6:38
4. "First Time" (Ibiza groove mix zero G RMX) — 5:48
5. "First Time" (trance club mix Unique & toxic RMX) — 7:31
6. "First Time" (extended mix djs@work RMX) — 6:52
7. "First Time" (extended mix free power 4 hypnotic) — 6:35

==== Charts ====
Chart (2003)	Peak position
Switzerland (Schweizer Hitparade)	61

=== Sunblock version ===
"First Time"

Single by Sunblock featuring Robin Beck
- B-side: "Main Funktion"
- Released: May 8, 2006
- Length: 2:40
- Label: Universal, Stockholm
- Songwriters: Terry Boyle, Gavin Spencer, Tom Anthony
- Producer: Sunblock

Sunblock singles chronology
"I'll Be Ready" (2006)	"First Time" (2006)	"Baby Baby" (2007)

Robin Beck singles chronology
"My Life" (2003)	"First Time" (2006)

In May 2006, Sunblock, an electronic music group from Sweden, released a cover of the song with Robin Beck as their second single. It became their second top-10 hit in the United Kingdom, charting at number nine on the UK Singles Chart. Sunblock performed the song on Top of the Pops on May 11, 2006.

==== Charts ====
Weekly charts

Chart (2006)	Peak position
Czech Republic Airplay (ČNS IFPI)	46
Finland (Suomen virallinen lista)	6
Hungary (Dance Top 40)	33
Ireland (IRMA)	10
Netherlands (Dutch Top 40)	28
Netherlands (Single Top 100)	48
Scottish Singles Sales (Official Charts)	3
Sweden (Sverigetopplistan)	32
UK Singles (Official Charts)	9
UK Dance (Official Charts)	7

Year-end charts

Chart (2006)	Position
UK Singles (OCC)	149

== See also ==
- "I'd Like to Teach the World to Sing (In Perfect Harmony)", which also came to prominence via a Coca-Cola TV commercial
