= Desmond Child =

American songwriter and producer (born 1953)

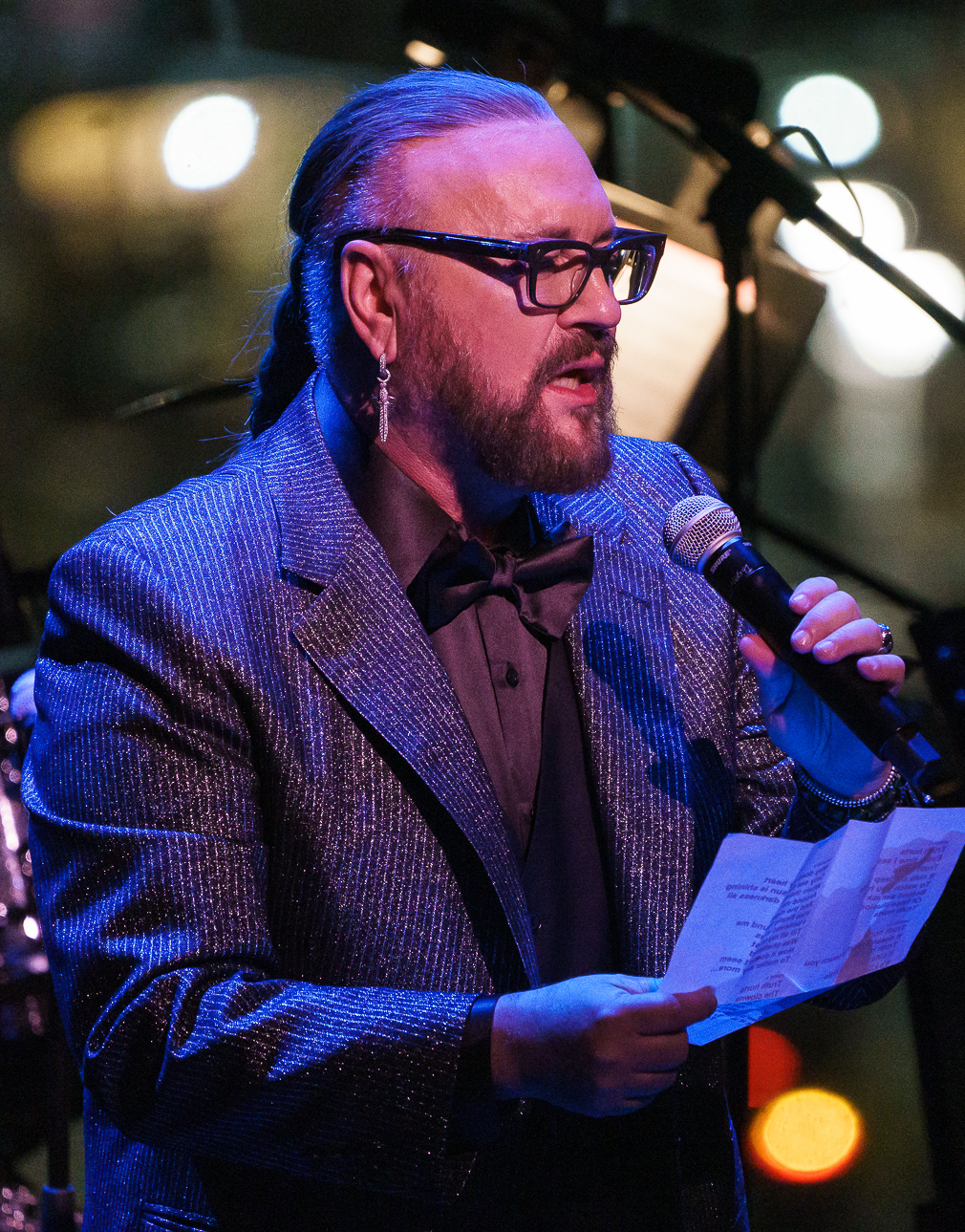
- Child in 2019

Background information
- Born: John Charles Barrett; October 28, 1953 (age 72); Gainesville, Florida, U.S.
- Genres: Pop rock; adult contemporary; alternative rock; hard rock; heavy metal; glam metal; disco; Latin pop
- Occupations: Songwriter; record producer
- Years active: 1975–present
- Spouse: Curtis Shaw (m. 2013)
- Website: desmondchild.com

John Charles Barrett (born October 28, 1953), known professionally as Desmond Child, is an American songwriter and record producer. He was inducted into the Songwriters Hall of Fame in 2008. He has been nominated for four Grammy Awards, a Primetime Emmy Award, and has won a Latin Grammy Award.

His hits as a songwriter include Kiss's "I Was Made for Lovin' You"; Joan Jett and the Blackhearts' "I Hate Myself for Loving You"; Bon Jovi's "You Give Love a Bad Name", "Livin' on a Prayer", "Bad Medicine", and "Born to Be My Baby"; Aerosmith's "Dude (Looks Like a Lady)", "Angel", "What It Takes" and "Crazy"; Cher's "We All Sleep Alone" and "Just Like Jesse James"; Brit Smith's "Karma's a Bitch", recently remade by JoJo Siwa; Alice Cooper's "Poison"; Michael Bolton's "How Can We Be Lovers?"; and Ricky Martin's "The Cup of Life" and "Livin' la Vida Loca".

== Career ==
Child first studied music at NYU Steinhart School, where he took classes in music theory. Child's career began when he formed an R&B-influenced pop rock band, Desmond Child & Rouge, in 1975 with singers Myriam Valle, Maria Vidal, and Diana Grasselli, backed by hired musicians. The band was known for their inclusion on the soundtrack to The Warriors in 1979, with the song "Last of an Ancient Breed", and for the song "Our Love is Insane", which charted at No. 51 in the Billboard Hot 100. Their two albums received positive reviews but sold poorly and the group disbanded in 1980. One member, Maria Vidal, had a hit in 1985 with "Body Rock".

Child then worked with songwriter Bob Crewe for two years.

Artists with whom Child has worked include Kiss, Cher, Aerosmith, Bon Jovi, Bonnie Tyler, Dream Theater, Roxette, Ricky Martin, Selena Gomez, Ava Max, and Kelly Clarkson. He was the key partner in Alice Cooper's album Trash (1989). He was also responsible for co-writing the Ratt album Detonator (1990).

Child scored a Billboard Top 40 hit in 1991 as a solo artist with "Love on a Rooftop", a song he had co-written with Diane Warren, originally recorded by Ronnie Spector, and later by Cher. "Love on a Rooftop" also peaked at number 55 on the Australian ARIA Charts.

He produced Meat Loaf's album Bat Out of Hell III: The Monster Is Loose, and co-wrote six of its songs.

Child wrote the song "Believe in Me" for Bonnie Tyler in 2012 and one year later it was selected as the Eurovision Song Contest entry for the United Kingdom, where it finished in 19th place in the final. Following the contest, Tyler received two Eurovision Song Contest Radio Awards for Best Song and Best Singer, making her the first UK representative to win the award. Child was to participate in the Eurovision Song Contest again as a songwriter in 2022, co-writing and producing the Finnish entry "Jezebel", performed by the Rasmus. The song would go on to finish 21st in the final.

Child was inducted into the Songwriters Hall of Fame in 2008. In 2013, he co-founded the Latin Songwriters Hall of Fame along with fellow Cuban-American composer Rudy Pérez. Desmond's autobiography, Livin' on a Prayer: Big Songs Big Life with David Ritz, was released on September 19, 2023.

== Personal life ==
Child lives in Nashville, Tennessee with his husband, Curtis Shaw, and their twin sons. Child and Shaw's struggle to have a baby via surrogacy is recounted in the documentary Two: The Story of Roman & Nyro.

The track "The Truth Comes Out" from Desmond Child & Rouge's second album Runners in the Night (1979) was written about 'coming out' to his girlfriend and Rouge bandmate, Maria Vidal.

The song "A Ray of Hope", written by Don Paul Yowell, was recorded by Child as a tribute to Child's younger brother, Joey (b. Joseph Stephen), who died in January 1991 of AIDS-related complications.

He is the biological son of Hungarian baron Joseph S. Marfy and Cuban songwriter Elena Casals. Child did not discover that Marfy was his biological father until he was 18 years old. Until that time, he had believed that his father was John Frederick Barrett, Casals' husband at the time of his birth, and for whom he was named. Through his Hungarian ancestry, Child received dual American-Hungarian citizenship in 2016. Child subsequently released "The Steps of Champions", a song he wrote for the Hungarian government as the official anthem of the sixtieth anniversary commemorations of the Hungarian Revolution of 1956. In fall 2004, an earlier version of the song (then titled "In the Steps of Champions") was given to the University of Miami. In 2016 he received Artisjus Lifetime Achievement Award.

== Discography ==
=== Desmond Child and Rouge ===
- Desmond Child & Rouge (Capitol Records) (1979)
  - "Our Love Is Insane" (No. 51, 1979)
- Runners in the Night (Capitol Records) (1979)

=== Solo ===
- The Warriors: The Original Motion Picture Soundtrack (A&M Records) (1979)
  - Song: "Last of an Ancient Breed"
- Discipline (Elektra Records) (1991)

=== For and with other artists ===
Year	Band/Artist	Song(s) written/co-written/produced	Album
1979	Kiss	"I Was Made for Lovin' You"	Dynasty
1980	Billy Squier	"You Should Be High Love"	The Tale of the Tape
1982	Cher	"When the Love is Gone", "Walk With Me", "The Book of Love"	I Paralyze
1984	Kiss	"Heaven's on Fire", "Under the Gun", "I've Had Enough (Into the Fire)"	Animalize
1985	Kiss	"King of the Mountain", "Who Wants to Be Lonely", "I'm Alive", "Radar for Love", "UH! All Night"	Asylum
1986	Bonnie Tyler	"If You Were a Woman and I Was a Man", "Lovers Again"	Secret Dreams and Forbidden Fire
1986	Bon Jovi	"You Give Love a Bad Name", "Livin' on a Prayer", "Without Love", "I'd Die For You"	Slippery When Wet
1987	Aerosmith	"Angel", "Dude (Looks Like a Lady)", "Heart's Done Time"	Permanent Vacation
1987	Cher	"We All Sleep Alone", "Main Man", "Give Our Love a Fightin' Chance", "Perfection", "Working Girl"	Cher
1987	Jimmy Barnes	"Waitin' for the Heartache", "Walk On"	Freight Train Heart
1987	John Waite	"These Times are Hard for Lovers"	Rover's Return
1987	Kiss	"Bang Bang You", "My Way", "Reason to Live"	Crazy Nights
1987	Jennifer Rush	"Down to You", "Heart Wars"	Heart Over Mind
1987	Ronnie Spector	"Love on a Rooftop"	Unfinished Business
1988	Kiss	"Let's Put the X in Sex", "(You Make Me) Rock Hard"	Smashes, Thrashes & Hits
1988	Bon Jovi	"Bad Medicine", "Born to Be My Baby", "Blood on Blood", "Wild is the Wind"	New Jersey
1988	Joan Jett & the Blackhearts	"I Hate Myself for Loving You", "Little Liar", "You Want In, I Want Out"	Up Your Alley
1988	Bonnie Tyler	"Notes From America", "Hide Your Heart", "Save Up All Your Tears", "Take Another Look at Your Heart", also produced the album	Hide Your Heart
1988	Aerosmith	"What It Takes", "F.I.N.E."	Pump
1989	Alice Cooper	Entire album, including "Poison"	Trash
1989	Animotion	"Calling It Love"	Room To Move
1989	Michael Bolton	"How Can We Be Lovers?" and "Love Cuts Deep", also produced the former	Soul Provider
1989	Billy Squier	"Stronger", "Tied Up"	Hear & Now
1989	Bonfire	"The Price of Loving You"	Point Blank
1989	Cher	"Just Like Jesse James", "Love on a Rooftop", "Emotional Fire", "Does Anybody Really Fall in Love Anymore?"	Heart Of Stone
1989	Ace Frehley	"Hide Your Heart"	Trouble Walkin'
1989	Kiss	"Hide Your Heart", "You Love Me to Hate You"	Hot in the Shade
1989	Robin Beck	"Hide Your Heart", "Don't Lose Any Sleep", "If You Were a Woman (And I Was a Man)", "Hold Back the Night", "Save Up All Your Tears", "Tears in the Rain"	Trouble or Nothin'
1989	FM	"Bad Luck", "Burning My Heart Down"	Tough It Out
1990	Ratt	"Givin' Yourself Away", "Heads I Win, Tails You Lose", "Lovin' You's a Dirty Job", "One Step Away", "Shame Shame Shame"	Detonator
1991	Kane Roberts	Entire album	Saints and Sinners
1991	Cher	"Save Up All Your Tears"	Love Hurts
1991	Michael Bolton	"Forever Isn't Long Enough", "New Love"	Time, Love & Tenderness
1991	Alice Cooper	"Dangerous Tonight", "Might as Well Be on Mars"	Hey Stoopid
1991	Joan Jett & the Blackhearts	"Ashes in the Wind", "The Only Good Thing (You Ever Said Was Goodbye)", "Lie to Me", "Don't Surrender", "Goodbye"	Notorious
1991	SouthGang	Entire album (co-writer)	Tainted Angel
1992	Bon Jovi	"Keep the Faith", "I'll Sleep When I'm Dead"	Keep the Faith
1992	Jennifer Rush	"Everything", "Wherever You Are", "Waiting for the Heartache", "Timeless Love"	Jennifer Rush
1993	Aerosmith	"Crazy", "Flesh"	Get a Grip
1993	Steve Vai	"In My Dreams With You"	Sex & Religion
1994	Joan Jett & the Blackhearts	"As I Am", "You Got a Problem", "Brighter Day"	Pure and Simple
1995	Jennifer Rush	"Tears in the Rain", "In the Arms of Love"	Out of My Hands
1995	Bon Jovi	"Something for the Pain", "This Ain't a Love Song", "Hearts Breaking Even", "Diamond Ring"	These Days
1995	Chynna Phillips	"I Live for You", "This Close", "Jewel in My Crown"	Naked and Sacred
1995	Roxette	"You Don't Understand Me"	Don't Bore Us, Get to the Chorus!
1997	Aerosmith	"Hole in My Soul"	Nine Lives
1997	Chicago	"All Roads Lead to You"	The Heart of Chicago 1967–1998 Volume II
1997	Dream Theater	"You Not Me"	Falling into Infinity
1997	Robbie Williams	"Old Before I Die"	Life Thru a Lens
1997	Hanson	"Weird"	Middle of Nowhere
	Cinderella	"War Stories"	Once Upon A ... Greatest Hits
1998	Billie Myers	"Kiss the Rain"	Growing, Pains
1999	Bon Jovi	"Real Life"	EdTV Original Motion Picture Soundtrack
1999	Ricky Martin	"Livin' la Vida Loca", "The Cup of Life"	Ricky Martin
2000	Ricky Martin	"She Bangs"	Sound Loaded
2000	Sisqó	"Thong Song"	Unleash the Dragon
2001	Tina Arena	"Soul Mate No. 9", "You Made Me Find Myself"	Just Me
2001	Alejandra Guzmán	"Quiero Vivir", "Volveré a Amar", "Todo", "Vagabundo Corazón", "Soy Tú Lluvia",	Soy
2002	Bon Jovi	"All About Lovin' You", "Misunderstood", "The Distance"	Bounce
2002	Sakis Rouvas	"Ola Kala", "The Light", "Disco Girl", also produced the album	Ola Kala
2002	Kelly Clarkson	"Before Your Love"	Thankful
2002	LeAnn Rimes	"Life Goes On", "The Safest Place", "Suddenly", "Sign of Life", "Review My Kisses", "Love Is an Army"	Twisted Angel
2003	Clay Aiken	"Invisible", "Run to Me"	Measure of a Man
2003	La Ley	"Más Allá"	Libertad
2004	Alejandra Guzmán	"Lipstick", "Sálvame", "Hoy Me Voy a Querer", "Tengo Derecho a Estar Mal", "Mundos", "Un Juego Más", "Tu Corazón", "Supersexitada"	Lipstick
2004	Jesse McCartney	"Because You Live"	Beautiful Soul
2004	Hilary Duff	"Crash World"	A Cinderella Story
2004	Hilary Duff	"Who's That Girl"	Hilary Duff
2004	Diana DeGarmo	"Dreams"	Blue Skies
2005	Bon Jovi	"Bells of Freedom", "Dirty Little Secret", "These Open Arms"	Have a Nice Day
2005	Carrie Underwood	"Inside Your Heaven"	Some Hearts
2005	Bo Bice	"Inside Your Heaven"	Non-album single
2005	Vince Neil	"Promise Me"	Non-album single
2005	Amanda Stott	"Homeless Heart"	Chasing the Sky
2005	Lindsay Lohan	"I Live for the Day"	A Little More Personal (Raw)
2005	Marion Raven	"October"	Cut Off
2006	Marion Raven	"Good 4 Sex"	Heads Will Roll
2006	Meat Loaf	"The Monster Is Loose", "Blind as a Bat", "Monstro", "Alive", "If God Could Talk", "What About Love?"	Bat Out of Hell III: The Monster Is Loose
2006	Paul Stanley	"All About You", "Lift", "Live to Win", "Wake Up Screaming", "Where Angels Dare"	Live to Win
2007	Sebastian Bach	"Falling into You"	Angel Down
2007	Bon Jovi	"(You Want to) Make a Memory"	Lost Highway
2007	Scorpions	"Hour I", "The Game of Life", "The Future Never Dies", "You're Lovin' Me to Death", "321", "Love Will Keep Us Alive", "We Will Rise Again", "Your Last Song", "Love Is War", "The Cross", "Humanity", "Cold"	Humanity: Hour I
2008	Ace Young	"Addicted", "A Hard Hand to Hold", "Where Will You Go", "How You Gonna Spend You Live", "The Girl That Got Away", "Dirty Mind", "The Gift"	Ace Young
2008	Katy Perry	"Waking Up in Vegas"	One of the Boys
2008	The Rasmus	Entire album, including "Livin' in a World Without You"	Black Roses
2009	Bon Jovi	"Brokenpromiseland", "Fast Cars", "Happy Now", "Learn to Love"	The Circle
2009	Margaret Cho	"I Cho Am a Woman"	I Cho Am a Woman (single)
2009	Tokio Hotel	"Zoom/Zoom into Me"	Humanoid
2009	The Stunners	"Santa Bring My Soldier Home"	(Santa Bring My Soldier Home-Single)
2010	Tokio Hotel and Kerli	"Strange"	Almost Alice
2010	Meat Loaf	"Elvis in Vegas"	Hang Cool Teddy Bear
2010	Ida Maria	"Bad Karma"	Katla
2010	Weezer	"Trainwrecks"	Hurley
2011	Ricky Martin	Entire album (co-writer)	Musica + Alma + Sexo
2011	Alice Cooper	"I Am Made of You", "The Underture"	Welcome 2 My Nightmare
2012	Porcelain Black	"Rock Angels"	Rock of Ages (film)
2012	Aerosmith	"Another Last Goodbye"	Music from Another Dimension!
2013	Sick Puppies	"There's No Going Back"	Connect
2013	Selena Gomez	"Love Will Remember"	Stars Dance
2013	Bon Jovi	"Army of One"	What About Now
2013	Bonnie Tyler	"Believe in Me", "Stubborn"	Rocks and Honey
2015	Zedd	"Beautiful Now"	True Colors
2020	Ava Max	"Kings & Queens"	Heaven & Hell
2020	Countess Luann	"VIVA LA DIVA"	VIVA LA DIVA (single)
2021	Bonnie Tyler	"Stronger Than a Man"	The Best is Yet to Come
2022	The Rasmus	"Jezebel", "Rise", "Live And Never Die"	Rise
2022	Weezer	"What Happens After You"	SZNZ: Autumn
2022	Jordan Smith	"Sparrow" "From the American Song Contest"	American Song Contest
2022	Christian Pagán	"LOKO" "From the American Song Contest"	American Song Contest
2022	Riker Lynch	"Feel the Love" "From the American Song Contest"	American Song Contest
2022	Marcus King	"Blood on the Tracks"	Young Blood
2022	Ceramic Animal	"Forever Song"	Sweet Unknown
2022	Bacon Brothers	"In Memory Of When I Cared"	Erato-EP
2022	Chris Willis	"If I Had Only"	single
2023	Winger	"Proud Desperado"	Seven
2024	JoJo Siwa	"Karma"	Non-album single
2024	Brit Smith	"Karma's a Bitch"	Non-album single

== Awards and nominations ==
=== Grammy Awards ===
Grammy Award nominations and wins for Desmond Child
Year	Nominee / work	Award	Result
2000	"Livin' la Vida Loca"	Record of the Year	Nominated
2000	"Livin' la Vida Loca"	Song of the Year	Nominated
2000	Ricky Martin	Best Pop Vocal Album	Nominated
2001	"Thong Song"	Best R&B Song	Nominated

=== Latin Grammy Awards ===
Latin Grammy Award nominations and wins for Desmond Child
Year	Nominee / work	Award	Result
2000	"Livin' la Vida Loca (Spanish Version)"	Record of the Year	Nominated
2002	Soy	Best Rock Solo Vocal Album	Won
2004	"Lipstick"	Best Rock Song	Nominated
2011	"Lo Mejor de Mi Vida Eres Tú"	Record of the Year	Nominated
2011	"Lo Mejor de Mi Vida Eres Tú"	Song of the Year	Nominated
2011	Himself	Producer of the Year	Nominated

=== Primetime Emmy Awards ===
Primetime Emmy Award nominations and wins for Desmond Child
Year	Nominee / work	Award	Result
2003	"Everyone Matters" from the It's a Very Merry Muppet Christmas Movie	Outstanding Original Music and Lyrics	Nominated

== See also ==
- List of songs written by Desmond Child
