= Life Goes On (LeAnn Rimes song) =

2002 song by LeAnn Rimes

Single by LeAnn Rimes

from the album Twisted Angel
- B-side: "Can't Fight the Moonlight"
- Released: August 5, 2002
- Studio: Various (US, UK)
- Length: 3:33
- Label: Curb; London
- Songwriters: LeAnn Rimes; Desmond Child; Andreas Carlsson
- Producers: Desmond Child; Peter Amato; Gregg Pagani

LeAnn Rimes singles chronology
"God Bless America" (2001)	"Life Goes On" (2002)	"Tic Toc" (2003)

Audio sample
- The first chorus of Rimes' "Life Goes On".: file; help

"Life Goes On" is a song by American country music artist LeAnn Rimes. Recorded for her seventh studio album, Twisted Angel (2002), the song was penned by Rimes, Desmond Child, and Andreas Carlsson, with production from Child, Peter Amato, and Gregg Pagani. Lyrically, "Life Goes On" speaks of moving on and letting go of the past. Rimes's then-label, Curb Records, first released the song on August 5, 2002, as the lead single from the album.

Commercially, "Life Goes On" missed the US Billboard Hot 100, peaking at number 10 on Billboard's Bubbling Under Hot 100 chart. It was a bigger hit outside the United States, peaking within the top 10 in Australia, Canada, the Netherlands, New Zealand, Romania, and Sweden while reaching the top 20 in Norway and the United Kingdom. A country remix of the song was released to country radio and peaked at number 60 on Billboard's Hot Country Singles & Tracks chart.

== Critical reception ==
Chuck Taylor of Billboard magazine gave "Life Goes On" a positive review, saying "['Life Goes On'] features a sexy, sassy performance that allows the chanteuse to boldly audition her full-fledged transition to womanhood." He ended his review by saying that "top 40 will respond to this enormously talented artist, who has delivered many a cherished hit."

== Music video ==
The music video for "Life Goes On" was filmed in New Orleans, Louisiana during the week of July 29, 2002 and was directed by Matthew Rolston. It takes a look at a relationship gone wrong.

== Track listings ==
UK CD1

1. "Life Goes On" (original mix) – 3:35
2. "Life Goes On" (Amato and Sheremet mix) – 6:21
3. "Life Goes On" (video) – 3:35

UK CD2

1. "Life Goes On" (M*A*S*H mix) – 8:04
2. "Life Goes On" (Almighty mix) – 3:50
3. "Life Goes On" (29 Palms mix) – 7:23

UK cassette single and European CD single

1. "Life Goes On" (original version) – 3:35
2. "Life Goes On" (Almighty mix) – 3:50

German limited-edition CD single

1. "Life Goes On" (original version) – 3:35
2. "Can't Fight the Moonlight" (Latino mix) – 3:36

Australian and New Zealand CD single

1. "Life Goes On" – 3:33
2. "Life Goes On" (Almighty mix) – 3:50
3. "Life Goes On" (Amato and Sheremet mix) – 6:21
4. "Life Goes On" (29 Palms mix) – 7:23

== Credits and personnel ==
Credits are taken from the Twisted Angel booklet.

Studios

- Recorded at various studios in the United States and United Kingdom
- Mixed at Larrabee West (Hollywood, California) and Larrabee North (Universal City, California)
- Lead vocals mixed at Larrabee North (Universal City, California)
- Mastered at Bernie Grundman Mastering (Hollywood, California)

Personnel

- LeAnn Rimes – writing, vocals, background vocals
- Desmond Child – writing, production
- Andreas Carlsson – writing
- Sherree Ford – background vocals, background vocals arrangement
- Nora Payne – background vocals
- Michael Landau – guitar
- Abe Laboriel Sr. – bass
- Abe Laboriel Jr. – drums
- Peter Amato – keyboards, production, arrangement, programming
- Gregg Pagani – keyboards, production, arrangement, programming
- Rob Chiarelli – mixing
- Bernie Grundman – mastering

== Charts ==
=== Weekly charts ===
Weekly chart performance for "Life Goes On"
Chart (2002–2003)	Peak position
Australia (ARIA)	7
Austria (Ö3 Austria Top 40)	24
Belgium (Ultratop 50 Flanders)	34
Belgium (Ultratip Bubbling Under Wallonia)	14
Canada (Nielsen SoundScan)	7
Europe (Eurochart Hot 100)	23
France (SNEP)	58
Germany (GfK)	39
Hungary (Editors' Choice Top 40)	21
Ireland (IRMA)	27
Netherlands (Dutch Top 40)	13
Netherlands (Single Top 100)	7
New Zealand (Recorded Music NZ)	4
Norway (VG-lista)	14
Romania (Romanian Top 100)	8
Scotland Singles (OCC)	7
Sweden (Sverigetopplistan)	10
Switzerland (Schweizer Hitparade)	24
UK Singles (OCC)	11
US Bubbling Under Hot 100 (Billboard)	10
US Adult Contemporary (Billboard)	9
US Adult Pop Airplay (Billboard)	28
US Hot Country Songs (Billboard)	60
US Pop Airplay (Billboard)	35

=== Year-end charts ===
Year-end chart performance for "Life Goes On"
Chart (2002)	Position
Australia (ARIA)	47
Canada (Nielsen SoundScan)	54
Netherlands (Dutch Top 40)	88
Netherlands (Single Top 100)	86
Sweden (Hitlistan)	91
US Adult Contemporary (Billboard)	35
US Adult Top 40 (Billboard)	90

Chart (2003)	Position
Australia (ARIA)	70
New Zealand (RIANZ)	17
US Adult Contemporary (Billboard)	42

== Certifications ==
Certifications and sales for "Life Goes On"
Region	Certification	Certified units/sales
Australia (ARIA)	Platinum	70,000^{^}
^{^} Shipments figures based on certification alone.

== Release history ==
Release dates and formats for "Life Goes On"
Region	Date	Format(s)	Label(s)	Ref.
United States	August 5, 2002	Contemporary hit; hot adult contemporary radio	Curb	
United States	August 12, 2002	Country radio	Curb	
United States	August 19, 2002	Adult contemporary radio	Curb	
Europe	September 23, 2002	CD	Curb	
United Kingdom	September 30, 2002	CD; cassette	Curb; London	
Australia	October 7, 2002	CD	Curb	
