= Billie Myers =

British pop singer

- Born: 14 June 1971 (age 55); Coventry, England
- Genres: Pop rock; R&B; alternative rock
- Occupations: Singer; songwriter
- Instrument: Vocals
- Years active: 1997–present
- Labels: Universal; Fruitloop

Billie Myers (born 14 June 1971) is a British rock singer and songwriter from Coventry, England. She is known principally for her 1997 transatlantic hit "Kiss the Rain".

== Career ==
=== Growing, Pains (1997) ===
Myers's debut album, Growing, Pains, was released in the United States on 18 November 1997. It achieved gold status, thanks in large part to the success of its first single. Myers wrote or co-wrote all songs featured on the record, and although she had not written songs prior to creating Growing, Pains, she had regularly written in journals and diaries for years beforehand, which facilitated the songwriting process.

Myers' first single, "Kiss the Rain", entered the UK Singles Chart and eventually reached number 4. In the United States, "Kiss the Rain" reached number 15 on the Billboard Hot 100 and spent 31 weeks on the chart.

The American television series Dawson's Creek (episode 2-02, titled "Crossroads") featured "Kiss the Rain", and it was also used in promotions for Archer Daniels Midland, which were most often seen on both Sunday morning talk shows and ADM's underwriting spot for The NewsHour with Jim Lehrer. The dance remix of "Kiss the Rain" was the first number 1 for both Myers and the remix team, Thunderpuss. A remix, featuring clips from the Kevin Smith film Chasing Amy, was produced by Pablo, then a DJ at WABB-FM in Mobile, Alabama.

The follow-up single, "Tell Me", reached number 25 on the Hot Adult Top 40 Tracks chart. Myers admitted that once "Kiss the Rain" had retreated from charting position, she felt disappointed because "Tell Me" did not match the success of her first single.

After the release of Growing, Pains and before her second album, Myers scored the title track for the Freddie Prinze, Jr. film Down to You. Myers received a Brit Award nomination in 1999 for Best British Female Solo Artist, alongside Billie Piper, but neither won.

=== Vertigo (2000) ===
In June 2000, Myers released her second record, Vertigo, which featured the single "Am I Here Yet? (Return to Sender)". The dance remix of "Am I Here Yet?" by DJ Junior Vasquez reached number 1 on the dance charts. "Should I Call You Jesus?" was the album's second single and invited controversy because of Myers's frank, honest questions about religion. Myers was satisfied with her second record because she was more assertive in the production process and more direct lyrically. Billboard called Vertigo's collection of songs "a fearless set that intertwines deft pop hooks, wickedly honest lyrics, and vibrant rhythms". Background vocals were sung by Elisa Fiorillo and Wendy Wright.

=== Just Sex (2005) ===
In November 2005, Myers released a single, Just Sex, with Artemis Records' Star Struck compilation album. One year later, Myers was named the closing act for Los Angeles Gay Pride 2006 and a featured act for New York City Pride 2006. She also appeared at the Chicago North Halsted Market Days 25th Anniversary Festival. The remix of Just Sex reached number 8 on the Billboard Dance Chart.

=== Tea and Sympathy (2013) ===
Following a soft release to fans in 2009, Myers officially released her third album, Tea and Sympathy, in March 2013. Myers discussed the album at length in an electronic press kit video which featured on the official Billie Myers website.

== Personal life ==
Myers has been outspoken about her bisexuality and how "not being gay enough" had caused her difficulties in the past.

She has also spoken out publicly numerous times about living with depression. As well as being an ambassador for the Jed Foundation, Myers supports The Mindfull Initiative which aims to support young people dealing with mental health issues.

== Discography ==
=== Studio albums ===
- Growing, Pains (1997) – UK No. 19, No. 91 US
- Vertigo (2000)
- Tea & Sympathy (2013)

=== Singles ===
Year	Single	Peak positions								Album
Year	Single	UK Singles Chart	AUS	US Billboard Hot 100	US Billboard Hot Dance Club Play	US Billboard Adult Contemporary	US Billboard Adult Top 40	US Billboard Top 40 Adult Recurrents	US Billboard Top 40 Mainstream	Album
1997	"Kiss the Rain"	4	41	15	–	28	6	1	7	Growing, Pains
1998	"Tell Me"	28	–	–	–	–	25	–	34	Growing, Pains
1999	"You Send Me Flying"	–	–	–	–	–	–	–	–	Growing, Pains
1999	"It All Comes Down to You"	–	–	–	–	–	–	–	–	Down to You soundtrack
2000	"Am I Here Yet? (Return to Sender)"	–	92	–	–	–	–	–	–	Vertigo
2000	"Should I Call You Jesus?"	–	–	–	–	–	–	–	–	Vertigo
2005	"Just Sex"	–	–	–	8	–	–	–	–	Non-album single
2010	"Wonderful"	–	–	–	11	–	–	–	–	Tea & Sympathy

== Videos ==
- "Kiss the Rain" (1997)
- "Tell Me" (1998)
- "You Send Me Flying" (1999)
- "It All Comes Down to You" (1999)
- "Am I Here Yet? (Return to Sender)" (2000)
- "I Hope You're Happy Now" (2009)
- "Wonderful" (2010)
