= Robin Beck =

American singer

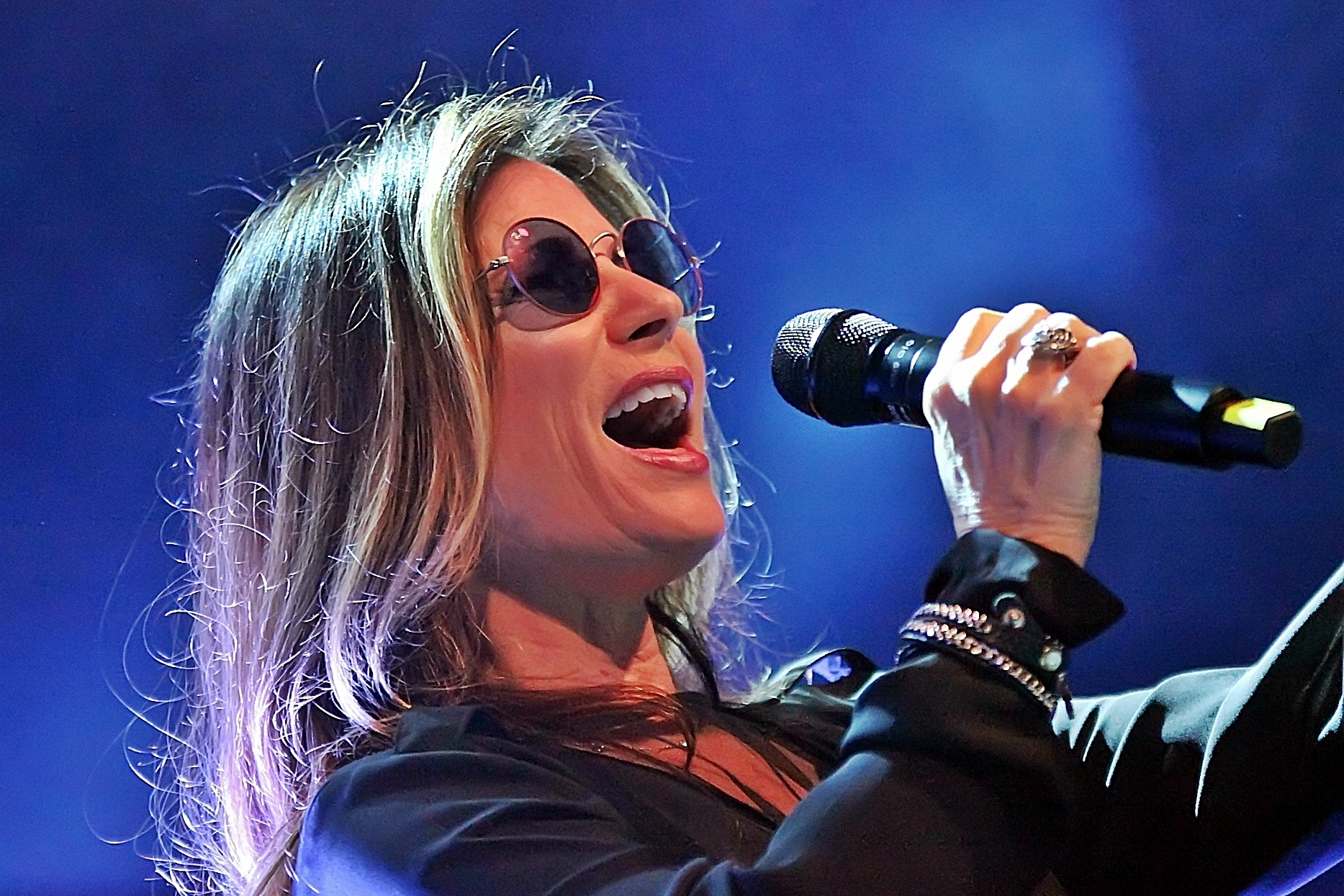
- Beck performing live in 2018

Background information
- Born: November 7, 1954 (age 71); Brooklyn, New York, U.S.
- Genres: AOR; pop rock; earlier: pop; disco; soul
- Occupations: Singer; songwriter
- Years active: 1979–present
- Labels: Mercury; Metronome; EastWest; Frontiers; Her Majesty's Music Room
- Website: www.robinbeckrocks.com

Robin Lynn Beck (born November 7, 1954) is an American rock singer. She topped the singles chart in the United Kingdom in 1988, and Austria, Germany, Norway, Netherlands and Switzerland in 1989, with her single "First Time", which had come to the public's attention via its use in a Coca-Cola commercial. Other well-known songs of hers are "Save Up All Your Tears", "In My Heart to Stay", "Tears in the Rain" and "Close to You".

Also, "First Time" was successfully covered or sampled many times, the most recent was made by Sunblock in 2006, peaking at number nine on the UK Singles Chart. Beck also performed it with German pop star Helene Fischer.

== Career ==
Prior to this achievement, she had spent time as a backing singer, supporting the efforts of Melissa Manchester, Chaka Khan, and Leo Sayer. She also sang on radio jingles for Jam Creative Productions, in particular "the ultimate one" for BBC Radio One in the UK. Her first album was released in 1979, and featured Irene Cara and Luther Vandross on backing vocals. Among the tracks was a slow, soulful cover of "Hello It's Me" that was originally recorded by Nazz and later by its songwriter Todd Rundgren. On the Billboard Dance Club Songs chart, the album's same-titled track "Sweet Talk" peaked at number 31, making it her only single to chart in the U.S., thus, she was a one-hit wonder there. However, her debut album's songs failed to achieve commercial success in the United Kingdom, although it later spawned "Save Up All Your Tears" which hit the Top 10 in Germany. After this, Beck contributed backing vocals to Cher's "If I Could Turn Back Time", and another version of Cher's song "Save Up all Your Tears", both of which had radio success worldwide.

Her major hit coincided with a unique chart confluence; after waiting thirty-five years for the first instance of three consecutive female vocalists at the top of the UK Singles Chart, she completed the second such occurrence in under a year. The first sequence was Belinda Carlisle, Tiffany and Kylie Minogue in 1988; the second threesome consisted of Whitney Houston, Enya and Beck. She has qualified as a one-hit wonder in the UK, as "First Time" is her only single to reach their chart. This is not the case in Germany, where "Save Up All Your Tears" reached number 10, and she had at least three other chart singles. The German success of "First Time" won Beck a 1990 RSH Gold award, given annually by a German radio station since 1988 on the basis of major regional airplay success. Despite the song's charting success overall in Europe, it failed to chart in her home country in the US due to the lack of promotion from Mercury Records and Coca-Cola, both whom had business political differences, of wanting to promote either First Time or Save Up All Your Tears.

Her album Trouble or Nothin' was produced by Desmond Child and featured songs by Child, Diane Warren, Holly Knight, Tom Kelly and Billy Steinberg. Despite their track record of success in the US, Beck's material did not find success. The song, "Hide Your Heart", charted in both the US and the UK as a single by Kiss the same year as Beck's version was released. It was also recorded that year by Ace Frehley and Molly Hatchet, and was the title track of Bonnie Tyler's album of the previous year. Two other songs from the Beck album were released as singles by Tyler — "If You Were a Woman (And I Was a Man)" (1986) and "Save Up All Your Tears" (1988) — and one by John Waite, "Don't Lose Any Sleep" (1987). Despite the songwriters' hit track records, none of those songs were major hits in the US in any of their versions. Partly for this reason, Mercury dropped Beck from its active roster thereafter. "A Crazy World Like This", co-written by Neil Giraldo, had been an album cut for Pat Benatar.

Beck went on to record further solo work with noted writers, which was best received in Germany, and continued to do guest vocal spots on other artists' albums, including a duet with Stan Bush. After a hiatus, with the exception of recording non-album songs, she returned in 2003 with her first album in nine years, and has followed that up with a new album every couple of years since.

Beck and her husband James Christian sang a duet on the song "Easy's Getting Harder" on Tommy Denander's third Radioactive album Taken in 2005.

In 2006, the Swedish dance outfit Sunblock sampled "First Time" for their dance track "First Time". Beck could be seen performing this song, which was released on May 21, and reached number nine in the UK Singles Chart. 2007 saw the release of Livin' on a Dream, where she co-wrote most of its tracks.

Her album Trouble or Nothing - 20th Anniversary Edition, was released in February 2009, which featured new recordings of the original album's tracks, plus four new songs co-written with Tommy Denander, who also handled guitars on the whole album as well as co-producing the new tracks. Also in 2009, she recorded three tracks as a special guest on Impulsia's debut album, Expressions: "Fly Away", "Alone" and "Seas to Cross".

In 2010, she appeared on a track as lead vocalist for the debut album of the Italian project Shining Line.

In 2011, she released her eighth album The Great Escape and also recorded vocals for the British NWOBHM band Saracen on their album Marilyn, depicting the life of Marilyn Monroe. It was released in September 2011. In 2012 she performed at the Firefest and was part of the Rock Meets Classic-Tour.

In 2013, she released her ninth album Underneath on August 12 in the UK and August 15 in Europe. Beck was interviewed most recently in that year by Paradise Rock.

On March 6, 2014, Beck started her "Perfect Storm Tour", co-headlined by House of Lords and Estrella.

On May 21, 2015, Beck started her "All That Glitters Tour" which took place in Finland, Sweden and Norway.

Beck appeared at Rock Icons on August 7, 2015, in Alicante, Spain.

It was revealed in April 2015 that Robin Beck was part of the Rockingham lineup at Nottingham's Rock City October 23–25. Beck's appearance was scheduled for the Friday, with Eclipse and headliner Tom Keifer (Cinderella) following her in the line-up.

Beck's tenth album Love Is Coming was released by Frontiers on October 13, 2017.

After nearly a decade, Beck announced her eleventh album Living Proof for May 15, 2026 by Frontiers.

== Personal life ==
Beck was born in Brooklyn's Brookdale Hospital, formerly Beth-El, on November 7, 1954, and grew up in the city's neighborhoods of East New York and Canarsie. Her family was Jewish. However, Beck disclosed in a January 2009 interview that both she and her husband, House of Lords frontman James Christian, were Christians. She has been married to Christian since 1996. They have a daughter, born in 1997.

== Discography ==
=== Albums ===
| Year | Album details | Peak chart positions | | | |
| Year | Album details | AUT | GER | SWE | SWI |
|---|---|---|---|---|---|
| 1979 | Sweet Talk: Release date: 1979; Label: Mercury; Debut album featuring Irene Cara and Luther Vandross on backing vocals for some of the songs | — | — | — | — |
| 1989 | Trouble or Nothin': Release date: 1989; Label: Mercury | — | 18 | 23 | 16 |
| 1992 | Human Instinct: Release date: 1992; Label: Deutsche Schallplatten Berlin | 23 | — | — | — |
| 1994 | Can't Get Off: Release date: 1994; Label: EastWest; Beck also co-producer | — | — | — | — |
| 2003 | Wonderland: Release dates: 2003 (U.S.); 2004 (Germany); Label: Reality/Portrait | — | — | — | — |
| 2005 | Do You Miss Me: Release date: August 2, 2005; Label: Frontiers | — | — | — | — |
| 2007 | Livin' on a Dream: Release date: July 9, 2007; Label: Frontiers; Beck also co-writer | — | — | — | — |
| 2009 | Trouble or Nothing – 20th Anniversary Edition: Release date: 2009; Label: Fastball Music; Album of re-recordings plus four new songs | — | — | — | — |
| 2011 | The Great Escape: Release date: 2011; Label: Fastball Music | — | — | — | — |
| 2013 | Underneath: Release date: August 20, 2013; Label: Cargo/Her Majesty's Music Room | — | — | — | — |
| 2017 | Love Is Coming: Release date: October 13, 2017; Label: Frontiers Music | — | — | — | — |
| 2026 | Living Proof: Release date: May 15, 2026; Label: Frontiers Music | — | — | — | — |

=== Singles ===
==== Lead performer ====
| Year | Single | Peak chart positions | | | | | | | | | | Album |
| Year | Single | AUT | FRA | GER | IRE | NOR | NZ | SWE | SWI | UK | US Dance | Album |
|---|---|---|---|---|---|---|---|---|---|---|---|---|
| 1979 | "Sweet Talk" | — | — | — | — | — | — | — | — | — | 31 | Sweet Talk |
| 1988 | "First Time" | 1 | 4 | 1 | 1 | 1 | 43 | 2 | 1 | 1 | — | Trouble or Nothin' |
| 1989 | "Save Up All Your Tears" | 27 | — | 10 | — | — | — | 17 | 5 | 84 | — | Trouble or Nothin' |
| 1989 | "Tears in the Rain" | — | — | 22 | — | — | — | — | 21 | — | — | Trouble or Nothin' |
| 1990 | "Don't Lose Any Sleep" | — | — | — | — | — | — | — | — | — | — | Trouble or Nothin' |
| 1990 | "Hide Your Heart" | — | — | — | — | — | — | — | — | — | — | Trouble or Nothin' |
| 1992 | "In My Heart to Stay" | — | — | 55 | — | — | — | — | — | — | — | Human Instinct |
| 1993 | "Gonna Take a Lifetime" | — | — | — | — | — | — | — | — | — | — | Human Instinct |
| 1993 | "Love Yourself" | — | — | — | — | — | — | — | — | — | — | Human Instinct |
| 1994 | "Close to You" | — | — | 79 | — | — | — | — | — | — | — | Can't Get Off |
| 1994 | "If Lovin' You Is Wrong" | — | — | — | — | — | — | — | — | — | — | Can't Get Off |
| 1999 | "Jewel in My Crown" | — | — | — | — | — | — | — | — | — | — | non-album singles |
| 1999 | "Shut Up and Kiss Me" | — | — | — | — | — | — | — | — | — | — | non-album singles |
| 2003 | "First Time" (with DJ Unique) | — | — | — | — | — | — | — | 61 | — | — | non-album singles |
| 2003 | "My Life" | — | — | — | — | — | — | — | | — | — | Wonderland |

==== Guest performer ====
| Year | Single | Peak chart positions | | | | | Album |
| Year | Single | FIN | IRL | NL | SWE | UK | Album |
|---|---|---|---|---|---|---|---|
| 2006 | "First Time" (with Sunblock) | 6 | 10 | 48 | 32 | 9 | I'll Be Ready: The Album |

=== Guest appearances/collaborations ===
- Pupo – Tornerò (1998) – Duet on track 1: "Non è un addio (Goodbye Is Not Forever)"
- Impulsia – Expressions (2009)
- Shining Line – Shining Line (2010) – Lead vocals on track 5: "Heat of the Light"
- Shanghai – Bomb's Away (2001) – Lead vocals, duet on track 3: "Through These Eyes"
- Saracen – Marilyn (2011) – Lead vocals on five tracks
- Kjetil By – Better Days (2014)
- Tomas Bergsten's Fantasy – Nightwalker (2015) – Lead vocals on track 2: "Stranger to Love"
- Radioactive – F4ur (2015) – Lead vocals on track 6: "When The Silence Gets Too Loud"

== Awards ==
RSH-GOLD - Radio Schleswig-Holstein-Musikpreis (Germany)

- Best Newcomer 1989 for "First Time"

IFPI (Germany)

- "First Time" Gold Single 1989
- "First Time" Platinum Single 1989

SNEP (France)

- "First Time" Silver Single 1989

IFPI (Swiss)

- "First Time" Gold single 1989

BPI (UK)

- "First Time" Silver Single 1988
