= Whoopi Goldberg on screen and stage =

Actress filmography

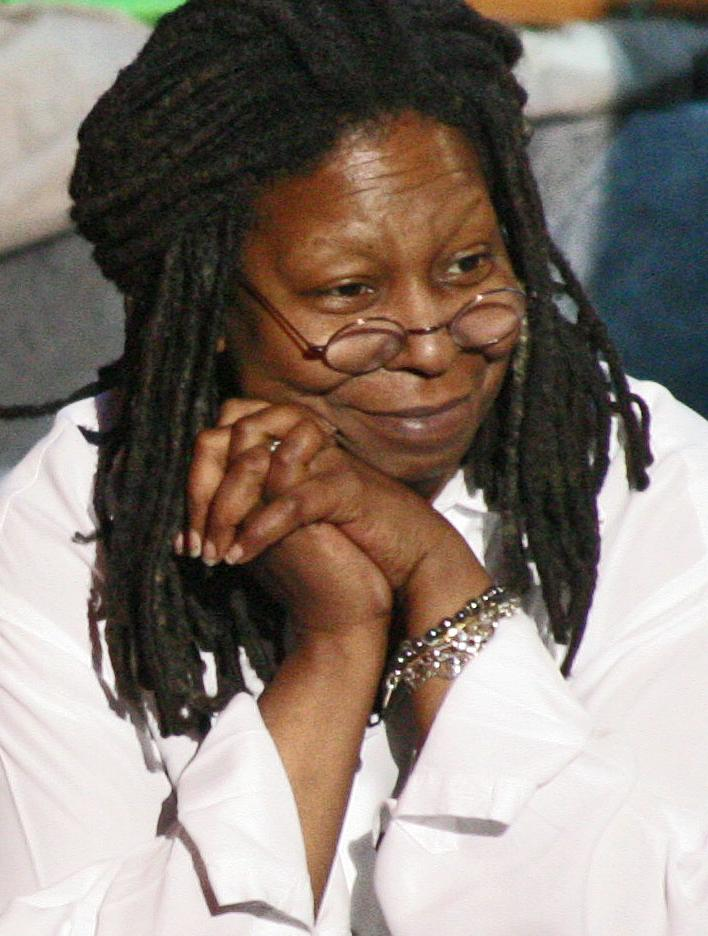
Goldberg at Comic Relief in 2006.

Whoopi Goldberg is an American actor, comedian, and singer. The following is her filmography throughout her entire acting career. She has won Academy, Emmy, Grammy, and Tony Awards. She won the Academy Award for the Best Supporting Actress for the film Ghost (1990).

Goldberg started her career as a comedian performing her one woman show Spook Stories off-Broadway. Mike Nichols saw her performing and helped her adapt the show for Broadway with the show titled, Whoopi Goldberg (1984). She gained career stardom after portraying Celie Harris Johnson in the Steven Spielberg directed coming-of-age epic The Color Purple (1985), which was based on the Alice Walker novel of the same name. For her performance Goldberg was nominated for the Academy Award for Best Actress and won the Golden Globe Award for Best Actress in a Motion Picture – Drama.

She won the Academy Award for Best Supporting Actress for Ghost (1990), becoming the second African-American woman after Hattie MacDaniel for Gone with the Wind to win the award. She was nominated for the Golden Globe Award for Best Actress in a Motion Picture – Musical or Comedy for her performance in the comedy Sister Act (1992). She reprised the role in Sister Act 2: Back in the Habit (1993). She has acted in films such as Jumpin' Jack Flash (1986), Clara's Heart (1988), Soapdish (1991), Sarafina! (1992), Ghosts of Mississippi (1996), How Stella Got Her Groove Back (1998), Girl, Interrupted (1999), Rat Race (2001), For Colored Girls (2010), and Till (2022). She has voiced roles in The Lion King (1994), The Pagemaster (1994), and Toy Story 3 (2010).

On television, she is best known for her recurring role as Guinan in the science-fiction series Star Trek: The Next Generation (1988–1993) and Star Trek: Picard (2022). She has guest starred on shows such as Moonlighting, A Different World, Sesame Street, Law & Order, 30 Rock, and The Conners. She has hosted the Academy Awards four times in 1994, 1996, 1999, and 2002. She currently co-hosts and moderates the talk show The View (2007–).

== Film ==
Key
†	Denotes films that have not yet been released

Year	Title	Role	Notes
1982	Citizen: I'm Not Losing My Mind, I'm Giving It Away		
1985	The Color Purple	Celie Harris Johnson	
1986	Jumpin' Jack Flash	Teresa "Terry" Doolittle	
1987	Burglar	Bernice "Bernie" Rhodenbarr	
1987	Fatal Beauty	Detective Rita Rizzoli	
1988	The Telephone	Vashti Blue	
1988	Clara's Heart	Clara Mayfield	
1989	Comicitis	Herself	Short subject
1989	Beverly Hills Brats	Herself	Cameo
1989	Homer and Eddie	Eddie Cervi	
1990	Ghost	Oda Mae Brown	
1990	The Long Walk Home	Odessa Cotter	
1991	Blackbird Fly	Herself	Short film
1991	Soapdish	Rose Schwartz	
1991	House Party 2	The Professor	Uncredited
1991	Dragon and Slippers	Matilda The Witch	Voice; English version
1992	Sister Act	Deloris Van Cartier / Sister Mary Clarence	
1992	The Player	Detective Susan Avery	
1992	Sarafina!	Mary Masembuko	
1993	National Lampoon's Loaded Weapon 1	Sgt. Billy York	Uncredited cameo
1993	Naked in New York	Tragedy Mask on Theater Wall	
1993	Made in America	Sarah Mathews	
1993	Sister Act 2: Back in the Habit	Deloris Van Cartier / Sister Mary Clarence	
1994	The Lion King	Shenzi	Voice role
1994	The Little Rascals	Buckwheat's Mom	
1994	Corrina, Corrina	Corrina Washington	
1994	Star Trek Generations	Guinan	Uncredited
1994	The Pagemaster	Fantasy	Voice role
1995	Boys on the Side	Jane DeLuca	
1995	Moonlight and Valentino	Sylvie Morrow	
1996	Eddie	Edwina "Eddie" Franklin	
1996	Theodore Rex	Katie Coltrane	
1996	Bordello of Blood	Hospital Patient	Uncredited
1996	Bogus	Harriet Franklin	
1996	The Associate	Laurel Ayres / Robert S. Cutty	
1996	Ghosts of Mississippi	Myrlie Evers	
1997	A Christmas Carol	The Ghost of Christmas Present	Voice role
1997	Destination Anywhere	"Cabbie"	
1997	In the Gloaming	Nurse Myrna	
1997	In & Out	Herself	Uncredited
1997	An Alan Smithee Film: Burn Hollywood Burn	Herself	Special appearance
1998	Titey	The Iceberg	Voice role
1998	Alegría	Baby Clown	
1998	A Knight in Camelot	Dr. Vivien Morgan / Sir Boss	Herself
1998	How Stella Got Her Groove Back	Delilah Abraham	
1998	Rudolph the Red-Nosed Reindeer: The Movie	Stormella, The Evil Ice Queen	Voice role
1998	The Rugrats Movie	Ranger Margaret	Voice role
1998	Alice in Wonderland	Cheshire Cat	
1999	The Deep End of the Ocean	Detective Candace "Candy" Bliss	
1999	Girl, Interrupted	Valerie Owens, R.N.	
2000	The Adventures of Rocky and Bullwinkle	Judge Cameo	Uncredited
2000	More Dogs Than Bones	Cleo	
2001	Golden Dreams	Calafia, the Queen of California / Narrator	Short film
2001	Kingdom Come	Raynelle Slocumb	
2001	Monkeybone	Death	
2001	Rat Race	Vera Baker	
2001	The Hollywood Sign	Woman at Funeral	Cameo
2001	Call Me Claus	Lucy Cullin	
2002	Showboy	Herself	Cameo
2002	My Fair Madeline	Miss Clavel	Voice role
2002	Star Trek: Nemesis	Guinan	Uncredited
2002	It's a Very Merry Muppet Christmas Movie	The Boss	
2003	Pauly Shore Is Dead	Herself	
2003	Bitter Jester	Herself	
2003	Beyond the Skyline	Herself	Short film
2003	Blizzard	Blizzard	Voice role
2004	Pinocchio 3000	Cyberina	Voice role
2004	SuperBabies: Baby Geniuses 2	Herself	
2004	Jiminy Glick in Lalawood	Herself	
2004	The Lion King 1½	Shenzi	Voice role; Direct-to-video
2005	Racing Stripes	Frannie	Voice role
2005	Doogal	Ermintrude The Cow (US Version)	Voice role
2006	Everyone's Hero	Darlin'	Voice role
2007	Farce of the Penguins	Helen	Voice role
2007	Homie Spumoni	Thelma	Voice role
2007	If I Had Known I Was a Genius	Mrs. Reed	
2008	Snow Buddies	Miss Mittens	Voice role
2008	Descendants	Red Flower	Voice role
2009	Madea Goes to Jail	Herself	Cameo
2009	Stream	Jodi	Short film
2009	Kambakkht Ishq	Herself	Cameo
2010	Toy Story 3	Stretch	Voice role
2010	For Colored Girls	Alice	
2010	Teenage Paparazzo	Herself	
2011	A Little Bit of Heaven	God	
2011	The Little Engine That Could	Tower	Voice role
2011	The Muppets	Herself	
2014	Teenage Mutant Ninja Turtles	Bernadette Thompson	
2014	Big Stone Gap	Fleeta	
2014	Top Five		
2014	TCB Baby	Dr. Reynolds	
2016	A Warrior's Tail	Mom Jozee	Voice role; English version
2016	King of the Dancehall	Loretta Brixton	
2017	9/11	Metzie	
2017	Yamasong: March of the Hollows	Yari	
2017	Gilbert	Herself	
2017	A Very Sordid Wedding	Priest	Cameo
2018	Furlough	Mrs. Stevens	
2018	Nobody's Fool	Lola	
2019	The Most Magnificent Thing	The Narrator	Voice role; Short film
2022	Luck	The Captain	Voice role
2022	Till	Alma Carthan	Producer
2022	My Father's Dragon	Cat	Voice role
2023	Ezra	Jayne	
2023	Atrabilious	Andrea Hart	
2023	The Color Purple	Midwife	Cameo
2024	Outlaw Posse	Stagecoach Mary	
2024	Babes	Dawn's Breasts	Voice role
2026	Asali: Power of the Pollinators	Galbanum	Voice role; short film
TBA	Captain Zero: The Movie †		Executive producer

=== Documentary ===
Year	Title	Role	Notes
1991	Wisecracks	Herself	Documentary
1992	The Magical World of Chuck Jones		Documentary
1994	Liberation	The Narrator	Documentary
1995	The Celluloid Closet	Herself	Documentary
1997	Pitch	Herself	Documentary, uncredited
1997	Mary Pickford: A Life on Film	Host / The Narrator	Documentary
1998	Junket Whore	Herself	Documentary
1999	Get Bruce	Herself	Documentary
2000	A Second Chance at Life	The Narrator	Documentary
2002	Searching for Debra Winger	Herself	Documentary
2003	Unchained Memories: Readings from the Slave Narratives	The Narrator	Documentary
2004	The N-Word	Herself	Documentary
2005	The Aristocrats	Herself	Documentary
2006	The Life of Nat King Cole	Herself	Documentary
2008	Nuremberg: A Vision Restored	Herself	Documentary
2008	Mr. Warmth: The Don Rickles Project	Herself	Documentary
2008	Our Country USA to Z	Herself	Voice; short subject
2008	The Sophisticated Misfit	Herself	Documentary
2008	Annie Leibovitz: Life Through a Lens	Herself	Documentary
2008	Meerkat Manor: The Story Begins	The Narrator	Documentary
2010	New York Street Games	Herself	Documentary
2011	Being Elmo: A Puppeteer's Journey	The Narrator	Documentary
2013	Richard Pryor: Omit the Logic	Herself	Documentary
2013	Whoopi Goldberg Presents Moms Mabley	Herself	HBO documentary
2016	The Beatles: Eight Days a Week	Herself	Television documentary
2017	The Problem with Apu	Herself	Television special
2017	Sammy Davis Jr: I've Gotta Be Me	Herself	Television documentary
2017	The Gospel According to André	Herself	Documentary
2018	Robin Williams: Come Inside My Mind	Herself	HBO documentary
2018	Mr. Rogers: It's You I Like	Herself	PBS documentary
2020	The Comedy Store	Herself	Television documentary
2021	Rita Moreno: Just a Girl Who Decided to Go for It	Herself	Documentary
2021	JFK Revisited: Through the Looking Glass	The Narrator	Documentary
2022	Butterfly in the Sky	Herself	Documentary; also executive producer

== Television ==
Year	Title	Role	Notes
1985	Whoopi Goldberg: Direct from Broadway	Various	TV special
1985	Television Parts	Herself	
1986	Moonlighting	Camille Brand	Episode: "Camille"
1987	Carol, Carl, Whoopi, and Robin	Herself	TV special
1988	Whoopi Goldberg: Fontaine... Why Am I Straight?	Fontaine	TV movie; also writer
1988	Pee-wee's Playhouse Christmas Special	Herself	TV special
1988–1993	Star Trek: The Next Generation	Guinan	28 episodes
1989	My Past Is My Own	Mariah Johnston	Television movie
1989	Kiss Shot	Sarah Collins	Television movie
1989	Hanna-Barbera's 50th: A Yabba Dabba Doo Celebration	Herself	Television movie
1990	Tales from the Whoop: Hot Rod Brown Class Clown	Herself	Television movie; also executive producer
1990–1991	Bagdad Cafe	Brenda	15 episodes
1990–1992	Captain Planet and the Planeteers	Gaia, The Spirit of Earth	Voice; 60 episodes
1990–2001	Sesame Street	Herself	6 episodes
1991	Chez Whoopi	Herself	HBO standup special
1991	Tales from the Crypt	Peligre / Herself	Episode: "Dead Wait"
1991	A Different World	Dr. Jordan	Episode: "If I Should Die Before I Wake"
1992	34th Annual Grammy Awards	Herself (host)	Television special
1992	Defenders of Dynatron City	Ms. Megawatt	Voice; Television short
1992–1993	The Whoopi Goldberg Show	Herself (host)	200 episodes
1993	Reading Rainbow	Herself	Episode: "Amazing Grace"
1993	A Cool Like That Christmas	Mom / Irwin	Voice; Television movie
1994	66th Academy Awards	Herself (host)	TV special
1994	The Fresh Prince of Bel-Air	Herself	Uncredited; Episode: "When You Hit Upon A Star"
1995	The Sunshine Boys	Nurse	TV movie; uncredited cameo
1995–1997	Happily Ever After: Fairy Tales for Every Child	Mother/ Zenobia the Hoodoo Diva	Voice; 2 episodes
1996	68th Academy Awards	Herself (host)	Television special, ABC
1997	Tracey Takes On...	God	Episode: "Supernatural"
1997	Rodgers and Hammerstein's Cinderella	Queen Constantina	Television movie
1998	A Knight in Camelot	Dr. Vivien Morgan	Television movie
1998	The Nanny	Herself / Edna	2 episodes
1998	Saturday Night Live	Iceberg (voice)	Episode: "Steve Buscemi/Third Eye Blind"
1998–2002	The Hollywood Squares	Herself (center square)	Also producer
1999	71st Academy Awards	Herself (host)	Television special, ABC
1999	Alice in Wonderland	Cheshire Cat	Television movie
1999	Our Friend, Martin	Mrs. Peck	Voice; Video
1999	Jackie's Back	Jackie's Sister	Television movie
1999	The Magical Legend of the Leprechauns	The Grand Banshee	2 episodes
1999–2000	Foxbusters	Ransome	Voice; all 26 episodes
2000	Celebrity Dish	Herself	
2001	What Makes a Family	Terry Harrison	TV movie; also executive producer
2001	The Weber Show	Herself	Episode: "...And Then the Sex Freaked Jack Out"
2001	Celebrity Deathmatch	Herself	Episode: "Celebrity Deathmatch Special Report"
2001	Beyond Tara: The Extraordinary Life of Hattie McDaniel	Herself (host)	TV movie
2001	Call Me Claus	Lucy Cullins	TV movie; also executive producer
2001–2002	Whose Line Is It Anyway?	Herself	2 episodes
2002	Dr. Katz, Professional Therapist	Herself	Voice; Episode: "Lerapy"
2002	74th Academy Awards	Herself (host)	Television special, ABC
2002	My Fair Madeline	Miss Clavel	Voice, Television movie
2002	It's a Very Merry Muppet Christmas Movie	Daniel's 'Boss'	Television movie
2002	Absolutely Fabulous	Goldie	Episode: "Gay"
2003	Liberty's Kids	Deborah Samson / Robert Shurtliff	Voice; 1 episode
2003	The Disco Ball	Herself	Television special
2003	Good Fences	Mabel Spader	Television movie; also producer
2003–2004	Whoopi	Mavis Rae	22 episodes; also executive producer
2004	Whoopi's Littleburg	Mayor Whoopi	3 episodes
2004	Sesame Street	Herself	Episode: 4063
2005	Whoopi: Back to Broadway – The 20th Anniversary	Various	TV special; also executive producer and writer
2006	Just for Kicks		Developed by and executive producer
2006	Dawn French's Girls Who Do Comedy	Herself	Three-part British TV series
2006	So Notorious	MaMa Belle	Episode: "Cursed"
2006	Law & Order: Criminal Intent	Chesley Watkins	Episode: "To the Bone"
2006	Everybody Hates Chris	Louise Clarkson	2 episodes
2007–2009	30 Rock	Herself	2 episodes
2007	Kathy Griffin: My Life on the D-List	Herself	Episode: "Suddenly Single"
2007– present	The View	Moderator/co-host	
2008	62nd Tony Awards	Herself (host)	TV special
2008	A Muppet Christmas: Letters to Santa	Taxi Driver	Television movie
2008	Entourage	Herself	Episode: "Fire Sale"
2008	Life on Mars	Brother Lovebutter	Season 1 - Episode 5
2008–2010	Hell's Kitchen	Herself	2 episodes
2009	The Cleaner	Paulina Kmec	3 episodes
2009–2010	The Electric Company	Herself	2 episodes
2012	The Middle	Jane Marsh	Episode: "The Guidance Counselor"
2012	Suburgatory	Yakult	Voice; Episode: "The Motherload"
2012	Robot Chicken	HAL 9000 / Celie Harris Johnson / Spirit / Swift Wind	Episode: "Choked on Multi-Colored Scarves"
2012	666 Park Avenue	Maris Elder	Episode: "Hypnos"
2012–2014	Glee	Carmen Tibideaux	6 episodes
2013	Whoopi Goldberg Presents Moms Mabley	Herself	TV movie; also director, producer, narrator
2013–2014	Once Upon a Time in Wonderland	Mrs. Rabbit	Voice; 3 episodes
2014	A Day Late and a Dollar Short	Viola	Television movie
2014–2016	The 7D	Magic Mirror	Voice; Recurring role
2014–2016	Nashville	Herself	2 episodes
2015	Law & Order: Special Victims Unit	Janette Grayson	Episode: "Institutional Fail"
2016	Strut		Executive producer
2016	The Tick	Herself	Episode: "The Tick"
2016	Miles from Tomorrowland	The GameMaster	Voice; 4 episodes
2016	Nightcap	Herself	Episode: "Lice-Ism"
2016	Ask the Storybots	Tooth Fairy	Episode: "Why Do I Have to Brush My Teeth?"
2016–2020	Blue Bloods	Regina Thomas	3 episodes
2016–2019	The Stinky & Dirty Show	Meg	Voice; 10 episodes
2017	When We Rise	Pat Norman	3 episodes
2017	Animals.	Dorothy	Voice; Episode: "Dog."
2017	Descendants 2	Ursula	Voice; Television movie
2017–2018	The Graham Norton Show	Herself	2 episodes
2018	The Late Show with Stephen Colbert	Good Witch	Episode: "Chadwick Boseman/Strangest Things"
2018	Random Acts of Flyness	Officer Pearson	Episode: "Items outside the shelter but within reach"
2018	Instinct	Joan Ross	6 episodes
2018	BoJack Horseman	Mikhaela	Voice; Episode: "The Light Bulb Scene"
2018–2020	Elena of Avalor	Lama	Voice; 3 episodes
2019	Scooby-Doo and Guess Who?	Herself	Voice; Episode: "The Nightmare Ghost of Psychic U!"
2019–2023	Summer Camp Island	Barb	Voice; Recurring character, 16 episodes
2020	RuPaul's Drag Race	Herself	2 episodes: season 12, guest Judge
2020	Sarah Cooper: Everything's Fine	Herself	Voice; Television special
2020–2021	The Stand	Mother Abagail Freemantle	Limited series, 8 episodes
2020–2022	The Con	Herself	Narrator; 15 episodes
2021	Staged	Mary	3 episodes
2021	The George Lucas Talk Show	Herself	Episode: "AmAIRican GrabBuddies"
2021	Marvel's M.O.D.O.K.	Poundcakes	Voice; Episode: "If Saturday Be... for the Boys!"
2021	Tuca & Bertie	The Narrator	Voice; Episode: "The Flood"
2021	Bubble Guppies	Pirate Myra	Voice; Episode: "The Holiday Pirates!"
2021–2025	Godfather of Harlem	Miss Willa	7 episodes
2021–2025	Harlem	Dr. Elise Pruitt	11 episodes
2022	Star Trek: Picard	Guinan	2 episodes
2022	Amphibia	Mother Olm	Voice; 3 episodes
2022	Caught in His Web		Executive producer
2022	A New Orleans Noel		Executive producer
2023	The Conners	Ms. Glen	Episode: "The Contra Hearings and The Midnight Gambler"
2024	Hacks	Herself	Episode: "Join the Club"
2026	Un posto al sole	Eleanor Price	Recurring role
TBA	Soapdish †	Rose Schwartz	Executive producer; Recurring cast
TBA	Anansi Boys †	Bird Woman	Recurring cast
TBA	Big City Greens †		Voice

== Theatre ==
Year	Title	Role	Venue	Refs.
1984	Whoopi Goldberg	Herself (also writer)	Lyceum Theater, Broadway	
1996	A Funny Thing Happened on the Way to the Forum	Prologus; Pseudolus	St. James Theater, Broadway	
2002	Thoroughly Modern Millie	Producer only	Marquis Theater, Broadway	
2003	Ma Rainey's Black Bottom	Ma Rainey (also producer)	Royale Theater, Broadway	
2004	Whoopi	Herself (also writer)	Lyceum Theater, Broadway	
2008	Xanadu	Calliope/Aphrodite	Helen Hayes Theater, Broadway	
2010	Sister Act	Mother Superior (also producer)	London Palladium, West End	
2011	Sister Act	(Producer only)	Broadway Theater, Broadway	
2017	Damn Yankees	Applegate	Stephen Sondheim Theatre, Broadway	
2019	Into the Woods	The Giant (voice only)	Hollywood Bowl, California	
2024–25	Annie	Miss Hannigan	The Theater at Madison Square Garden	

== Music videos ==
Year	Title	Artist(s)	Role	Notes
1989	"Monster in the Mirror"	Sesame Street	Herself	Directed by Laura DiTrapani
2001	"Parents Just Don't Understand"	Lil Romeo, Nick Cannon and 3LW	Nick's Mother	Directed by Jessy Terrero

== Video game ==
Year	Title	Role	Notes
2002	Quest for the Code	Moldy	Voice
