= List of awards and nominations received by Whoopi Goldberg =

Whoopi Goldberg awards and nominations
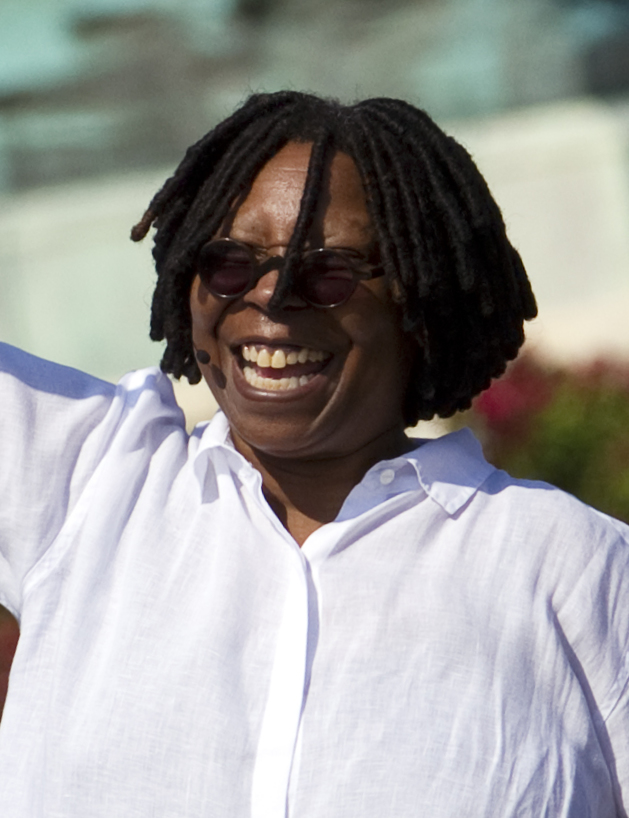
Awards and nominations
Award	Wins	Nominations
Academy Awards	1	2
BAFTA Awards	1	1
Emmy Awards	2	27
Golden Globes	2	3
Grammy Awards	1	2
Tony Awards	1	3

Totals (Note: Certain award groups do not simply award one winner. They acknowledge several different recipients, have runners-up, and have third place. Since this is a specific recognition and is different from losing an award, runner-up mentions are considered wins in this award tally. For simplification and to avoid errors, each award in this list has been presumed to have had a prior nomination.)
- Wins: 70
- Nominations: 119

This article is a list of awards and nominations received by Whoopi Goldberg.

Whoopi Goldberg is an American actress who has received many awards and nominations for her film, television, and stage work. Having acted in over 150 films, Goldberg is one of the few people to achieve the EGOT, having won the four major American awards for professional entertainers: an Emmy (Television), a Grammy (Music), an Oscar (Film), and a Tony (Theater).

Goldberg has received two Academy Award nominations, for The Color Purple and Ghost, winning for Ghost. She is the first African American to have received Academy Award nominations for both Best Actress and Best Supporting Actress. She has received three Golden Globe nominations, winning two (Best Actress in 1986 for The Color Purple, and Best Supporting Actress in 1991 for Ghost). For Ghost, she also won a BAFTA Award for Best Actress in a Supporting Role in 1991. In February 2002, Goldberg sent her Oscar statuette from Ghost to the Academy of Motion Picture Arts and Sciences to be cleaned and replated. During this time, the statuette was taken from its shipping container and later retrieved by the shipping company, UPS.

She won a Grammy Award for Best Comedy Recording in 1985 for "Whoopi Goldberg: Direct from Broadway," becoming only the second solo female performer—not part of a duo or team—at the time to receive the award, and the first African-American woman. Goldberg is one of only three single women performers to receive that award. She won a Tony Award in 2002 as a producer of the Broadway musical Thoroughly Modern Millie. She has received eight Daytime Emmy nominations, winning two. She has received nine Primetime Emmy nominations. In 2009, Goldberg won the Daytime Emmy Award for Outstanding Talk Show Host for her role on The View. She shared the award with her then co-hosts Joy Behar, Sherri Shepherd, Elisabeth Hasselbeck, and Barbara Walters.

== Major associations ==
=== Academy Awards ===
Year	Category	Nominated work	Result	Ref.
1986	Best Actress	The Color Purple	Nominated	
1991	Best Supporting Actress	Ghost	Won	

=== BAFTA Awards ===
Year	Category	Nominated work	Result	Ref.
British Academy Film Awards
1991	Best Actress in a Supporting Role	Ghost	Won	

=== Emmy Awards ===
Year	Category	Nominated work	Result	Ref.
Primetime Emmy Awards
1986	Outstanding Guest Actress in a Drama Series	Moonlighting	Nominated	
1991	Outstanding Guest Actress in a Comedy Series	A Different World	Nominated	
1994	Outstanding Performance in a Variety Program	66th Academy Awards	Nominated	
1996	Outstanding Performance in a Variety Program	68th Academy Awards	Nominated	
1996	Outstanding Performance in a Variety Program	Comic Relief VII	Nominated	
2005	Outstanding Performance in a Variety Program	Whoopi: Back to Broadway	Nominated	
2009	Outstanding Special Class Program	62nd Tony Awards	Nominated	
2014	Outstanding Documentary Special	Moms Mabley: I Got Somethin' to Tell You	Nominated	
2014	Outstanding Narrator	Moms Mabley: I Got Somethin' to Tell You	Nominated	
Daytime Emmy Awards
1989	Outstanding Performer in a Children's Special	CBS Schoolbreak Special	Nominated	
1991	Outstanding Performer in a Children's Special	Captain Planet and the Planeteers	Nominated	
1991	Outstanding Children's Special	Tales from the Whoop: Hot Rod Brown Class Clown	Nominated	
1999	Outstanding Audience Game Show	Hollywood Squares	Nominated	
2000	Outstanding Audience Game Show	Hollywood Squares	Nominated	
2001	Outstanding Audience Game Show	Hollywood Squares	Nominated	
2002	Outstanding Audience Game Show	Hollywood Squares	Nominated	
2002	Outstanding Special Class Special	Beyond Tara: The Extraordinary Life of Hattie McDaniel	Won	
2008	Outstanding Entertainment Talk Show Host	The View	Nominated	
2009	Outstanding Entertainment Talk Show Host	The View	Won	
2010	Outstanding Entertainment Talk Show Host	The View	Nominated	
2011	Outstanding Entertainment Talk Show Host	The View	Nominated	
2014	Outstanding Entertainment Talk Show Host	The View	Nominated	
2016	Outstanding Entertainment Talk Show Host	The View	Nominated	
2017	Outstanding Entertainment Talk Show Host	The View	Nominated	
2018	Outstanding Entertainment Talk Show Host	The View	Nominated	
2019	Outstanding Entertainment Talk Show Host	The View	Nominated	
2020	Outstanding Informative Talk Show Host	The View	Nominated	
News and Documentary Emmy Awards
2025	Outstanding Arts and Culture Documentary	Butterfly in the Sky	Nominated	

=== Golden Globe Awards ===
Year	Category	Nominated work	Result	Ref.
1986	Best Actress in a Motion Picture – Drama	The Color Purple	Won	
1991	Best Supporting Actress – Motion Picture	Ghost	Won	
1993	Best Actress – Motion Picture Comedy or Musical	Sister Act	Nominated	

=== Grammy Awards ===
Year	Category	Nominated work	Result	Ref.
1986	Best Comedy Album	Whoopi Goldberg: Original Broadway Show Recording	Won	
1989	Best Comedy Album	Fontaine: Why Am I Straight?	Nominated	

=== Tony Awards ===
Year	Category	Nominated work	Result	Ref.
2002	Best Musical	Thoroughly Modern Millie	Won	
2005	Best Special Theatrical Event	Whoopi the 20th Anniversary Show	Nominated	
2011	Best Musical	Sister Act	Nominated	

== Miscellaneous awards ==
Organizations	Year	Category	Project	Result	Ref.
Audie Awards	2010	Audiobook of the Year	Nelson Mandela's Favorite African Folktales	Won	
Audie Awards	2010	Multi-Voiced Performance	Nelson Mandela's Favorite African Folktales	Won	
Saturn Awards	1991	Best Supporting Actress	Ghost	Won	
Saturn Awards	1995	Best Supporting Actress	Star Trek Generations	Nominated	

== Other theatre awards ==
Organizations	Year	Category	Project	Result	Ref.
Drama Desk Awards	1985	Outstanding Solo Performance	Whoopi Goldberg	Won	
Outer Critics Circle Awards	1985	Outstanding Debut Performance	Whoopi Goldberg	Won	
Theatre World Award	1985	Theatre World Award	Whoopi Goldberg	Won	

== Honorary awards ==
Organizations	Year	Notes	Result	Ref.
Harvard University	1993	Hasty Pudding Woman of the Year	Honored	
GLAAD Media Awards	1999	GLAAD Vanguard Award	Honored	
Mark Twain Prize for American Humor	2001	Statue	Honored	
Hollywood Walk of Fame	2001	Motion Picture Star	Honored	
US Comedy Arts Festival	2002	AFI Star Award	Honored	
Temple University	2013	Lew Klein Award	Honored	
Variety Power of Women Awards	2015	Power of Women Award	Honored	
Disney Legend Award	2017	Hall of Fame Inductee	Honored	
Essence Black Women in Hollywood	2021	Honoree	Honored	
Ellis Island Medal of Honor	2024	Medal	Honored	

== Honorary degrees ==
Organizations	Year	Notes	Ref.
Wilson College	1987	Honorary Humanities degree	
Goodwin University	2018	Honorary degree (doctorate of letters)	

== See also ==
- Whoopi Goldberg filmography
