= List of Top Country Albums number ones of 1999 =

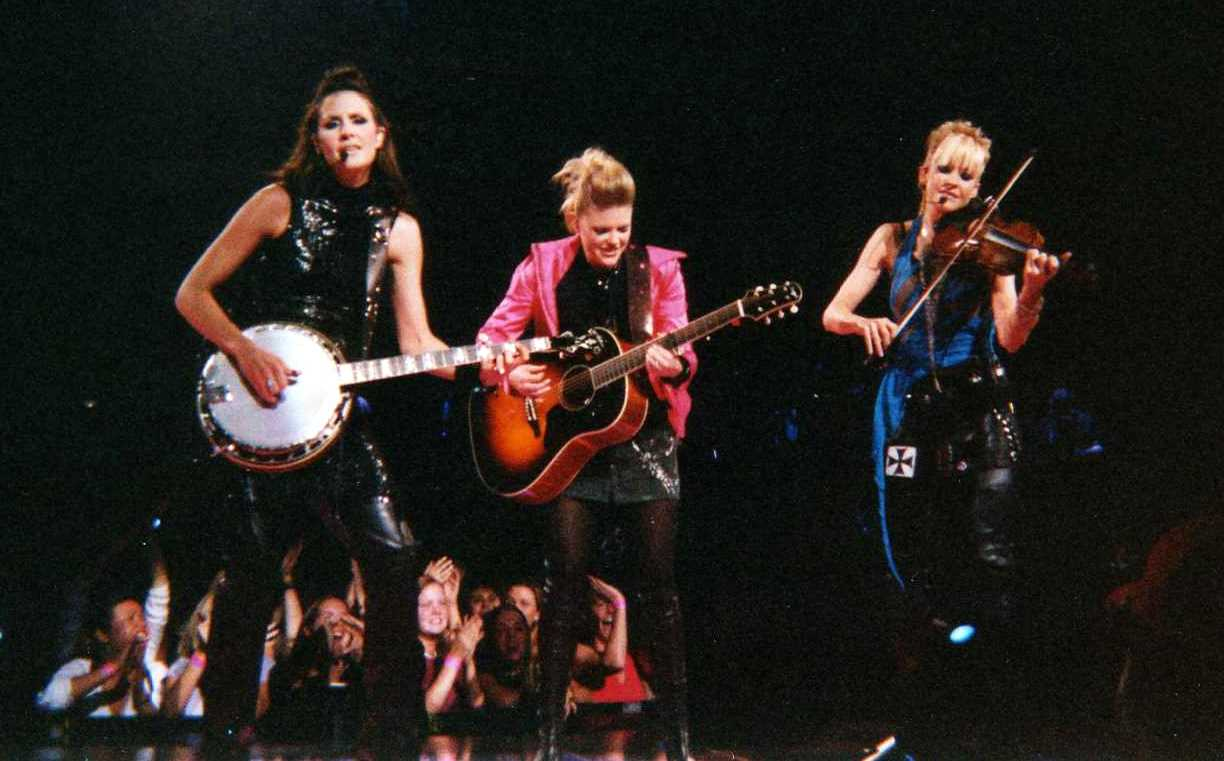
The Dixie Chicks had two chart-topping albums in 1999.

Top Country Albums is a chart that ranks the top-performing country music albums in the United States, published by Billboard. In 1999, eight different albums topped the chart, based on electronic point of sale data provided by SoundScan Inc.

In the issue of Billboard dated January 2, Garth Brooks occupied the top spot with the live recording Double Live, the album's fifth week at number one. Having been certified more than 20 times platinum by the Recording Industry Association of America, Double Live is the biggest-selling live album of all time in the United States. Later in the year, Brooks returned to the top of the chart when he spent a single week at number one with the seasonal album Garth Brooks & the Magic of Christmas. It was the singer's eighth consecutive number one and his tenth chart-topping album of the 1990s, a decade in which he experienced a level of mainstream popularity and success unprecedented for a country artist. Another country singer who became a global superstar during this era was Canadian vocalist Shania Twain, whose album Come On Over spent 26 weeks at number one during 1999, including a spell of 15 consecutive weeks in the top spot, the longest such run of the year. The album would ultimately spend a total of 50 weeks at number one, making it the longest-running chart-topper in the history of the Top Country Albums listing. In 2000, it was recognized by the Recording Industry Association of America as the highest-selling album of all time by a female artist, as well as the biggest-selling country album.

Garth Brooks was one of two acts with two number ones in 1999, the other being the all-female trio the Dixie Chicks. The group's first album to enter the Top Country Albums listing, Wide Open Spaces, finally reached the top spot in its 51st week on the chart, and remained there for seven weeks. The group returned to the top spot in September with Fly, which spent eight weeks at number one. Both albums won the Grammy Award for Best Country Album, at the 1999 and 2000 ceremonies respectively. As well as the Dixie Chicks, Faith Hill topped the chart for the first time in 1999 with her album Breathe, which reached the peak position in the issue of Billboard dated November 27. It would go on to win the Grammy Award for Best Country Album at the 2001 ceremony. Hill's first appearance atop the listing came six months after her husband, Tim McGraw, achieved his fourth consecutive number one with A Place in the Sun.

== Chart history ==
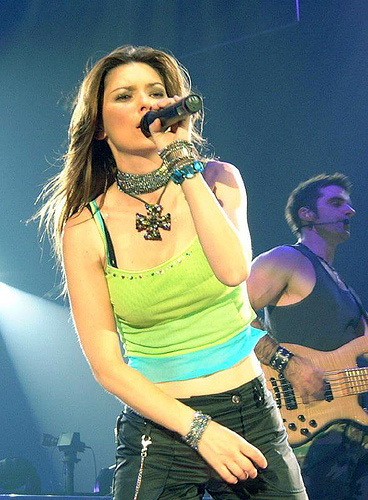
Shania Twain spent 26 weeks at number one with Come On Over, which would go on to become the longest-running chart-topper in the history of the Top Country Albums listing.

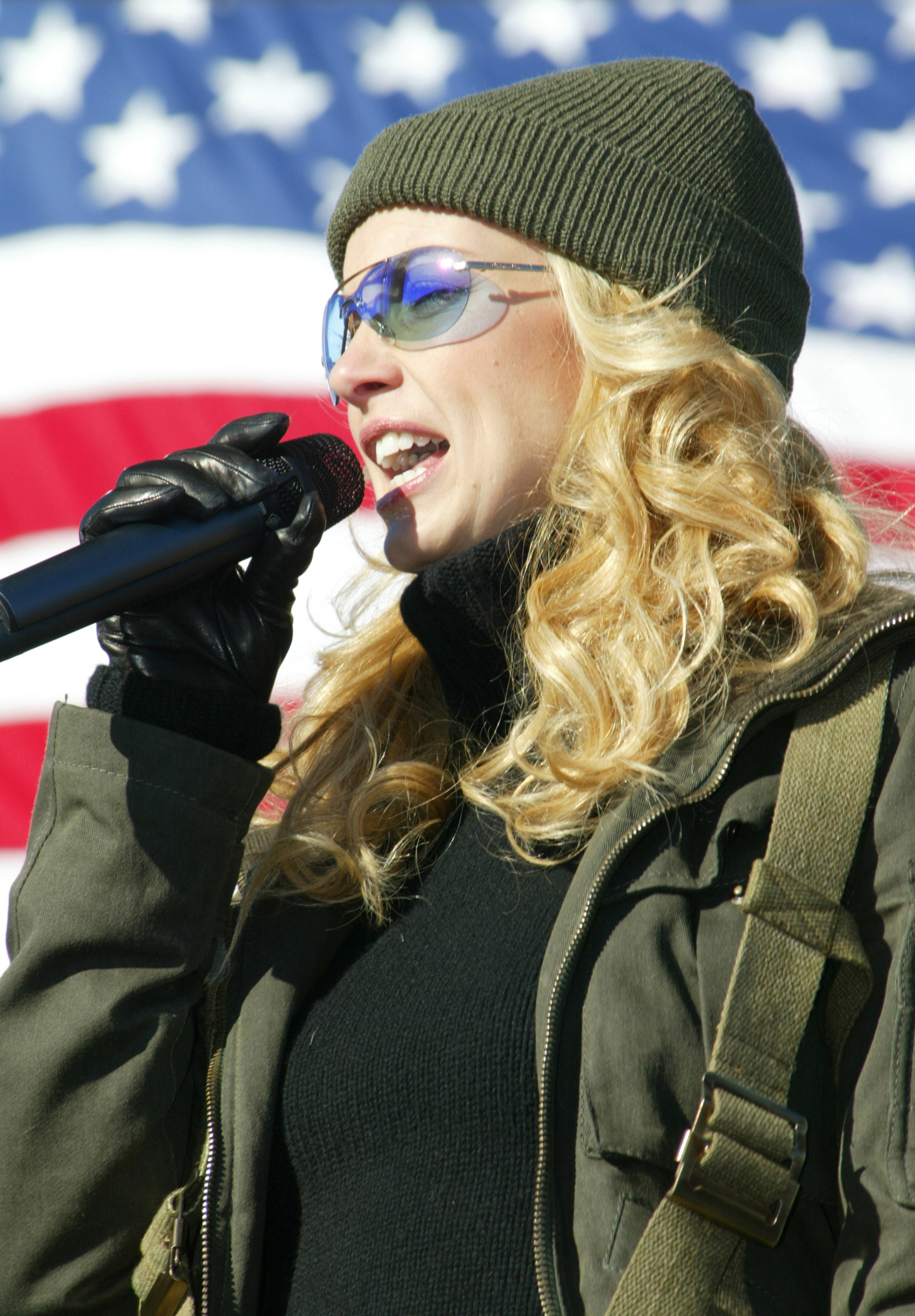
Faith Hill had her first number one in 1999 with Breathe.

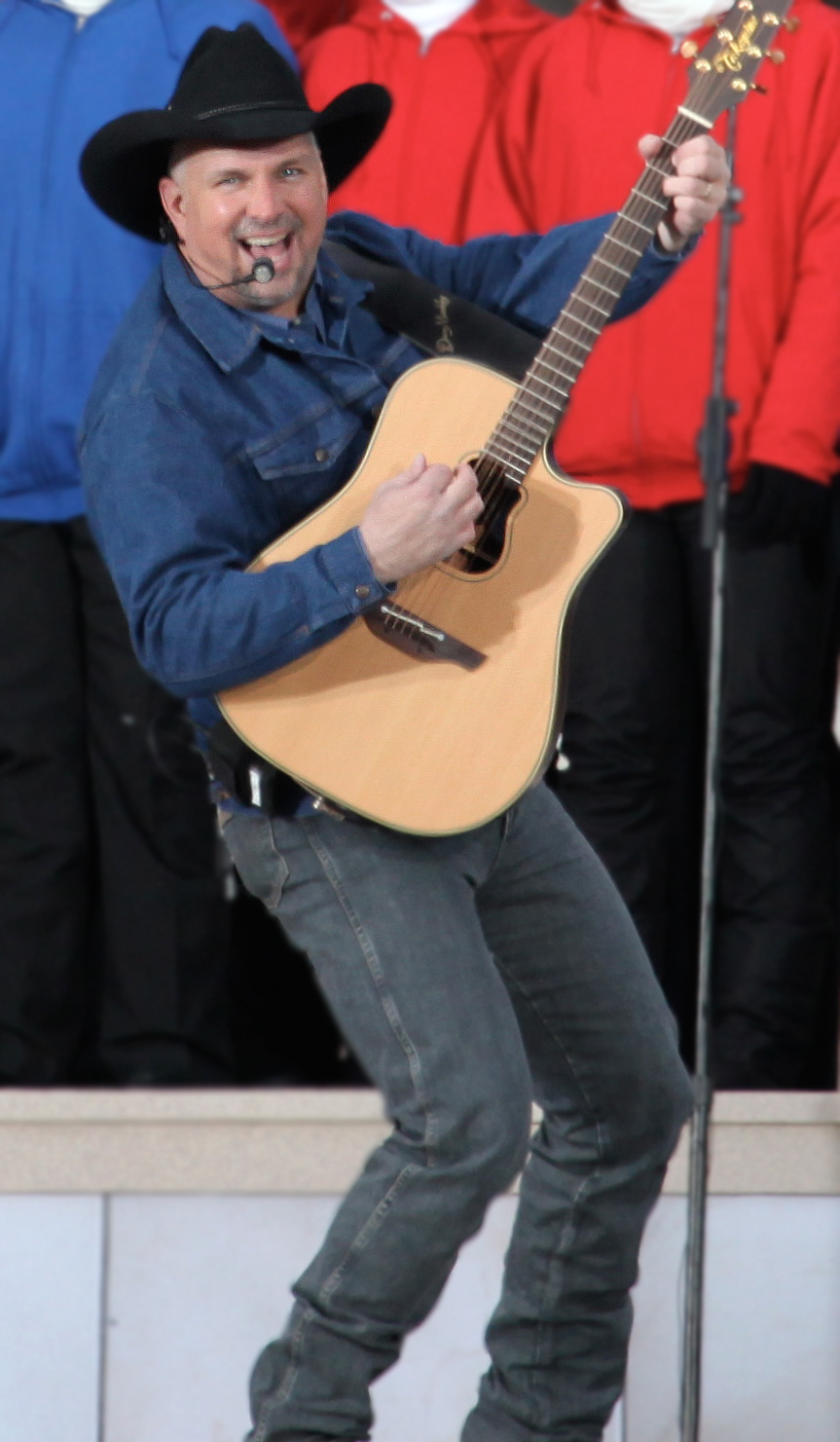
Garth Brooks had two number ones during the year.

Issue date	Title	Artist(s)	Ref.
January 2	Double Live	Garth Brooks	
January 9	Double Live	Garth Brooks	
January 16	Double Live	Garth Brooks	
January 23	Double Live	Garth Brooks	
January 30	Wide Open Spaces	Dixie Chicks	
February 6	Wide Open Spaces	Dixie Chicks	
February 13	Wide Open Spaces	Dixie Chicks	
February 20	Wide Open Spaces	Dixie Chicks	
February 27	Wide Open Spaces	Dixie Chicks	
March 6	Wide Open Spaces	Dixie Chicks	
March 13	Wide Open Spaces	Dixie Chicks	
March 20	Come On Over	Shania Twain	
March 27	Come On Over	Shania Twain	
April 3	Come On Over	Shania Twain	
April 10	Come On Over	Shania Twain	
April 17	Come On Over	Shania Twain	
April 24	Come On Over	Shania Twain	
May 1	Come On Over	Shania Twain	
May 8	Come On Over	Shania Twain	
May 15	Come On Over	Shania Twain	
May 22	A Place in the Sun	Tim McGraw	
May 29	A Place in the Sun	Tim McGraw	
June 5	Come On Over	Shania Twain	
June 12	Come On Over	Shania Twain	
June 19	Come On Over	Shania Twain	
June 26	Come On Over	Shania Twain	
July 3	Come On Over	Shania Twain	
July 10	Come On Over	Shania Twain	
July 17	Come On Over	Shania Twain	
July 24	Come On Over	Shania Twain	
July 31	Come On Over	Shania Twain	
August 7	Come On Over	Shania Twain	
August 14	Come On Over	Shania Twain	
August 21	Come On Over	Shania Twain	
August 28	Come On Over	Shania Twain	
September 4	Come On Over	Shania Twain	
September 11	Come On Over	Shania Twain	
September 18	Fly	Dixie Chicks	
September 25	Fly	Dixie Chicks	
October 2	Fly	Dixie Chicks	
October 9	Fly	Dixie Chicks	
October 16	Fly	Dixie Chicks	
October 23	Fly	Dixie Chicks	
October 30	Fly	Dixie Chicks	
November 6	Fly	Dixie Chicks	
November 13	LeAnn Rimes	LeAnn Rimes	
November 20	LeAnn Rimes	LeAnn Rimes	
November 27	Breathe	Faith Hill	
December 4	Breathe	Faith Hill	
December 11	Come On Over	Shania Twain	
December 18	Garth Brooks and the Magic of Christmas	Garth Brooks	
December 25	Come On Over	Shania Twain	
