= Joseph Olshan =

American novelist

Joseph Olshan is an American novelist.

== Life and career ==
Olshan is the author of ten novels, most recently, Black Diamond Fall (Polis Books, 2018). His first novel, Clara's Heart, won the Times/Jonathan Cape Young Writers' Competition and went on to be made into a feature film starring Whoopi Goldberg in 1988. His 2008 book The Conversion was a Stonewall Honor Book in Literature.

In addition to his novels, he has written extensively for newspapers and magazines, including the San Francisco Chronicle The New York Times, The New York Times Magazine, The Times, The Observer, The Independent, The Washington Post, The Chicago Tribune, The New York Observer, Harper's Bazaar, People Magazine, and Entertainment Weekly. Between 1992 and 1994 he was a regular book reviewer for The Wall Street Journal. For most of the 1990s he was a professor of Creative Writing at New York University, where he taught both graduate and undergraduate courses. He is currently editorial director of Delphinium Books (distributed by Harpercollins).

Olshan is published in the U.S. by St. Martin's Press and Berkley Books and in United Kingdom by Bloomsbury Publishing and by Arcadia Books. His work has been translated into sixteen languages. He grew up in Harrison, New York, and New York City and graduated from the University of California, Santa Barbara. He lives in Bend, Oregon and Sharon, Vermont.

Olshan is openly gay. He is not considered a writer of gay literature but prefers to be considered simply as a "writer".

== Novels ==
- Black Diamond Fall (Polis Books, 2018)
- Cloudland (St. Martin's Press, 2012)
- The Conversion (St. Martin's Press, 2008)
- In Clara's Hands (Bloomsbury, 2003)
- Vanitas (Simon & Schuster, 1998)
- Nightswimmer (Simon & Schuster, 1994)
- The Sound of Heaven (Bloomsbury, 1992)
- The Waterline (Doubleday, 1989)
- A Warmer Season (Bloomsbury/McGraw-Hill, co-pub, 1987)
- Clara's Heart (Arbor House, 1985)

== Sources ==
- Library of Congress Online Catalog > Joseph Olshan
