= Mary Had a Little Lamb (disambiguation) =

"Mary Had a Little Lamb" is a nursery rhyme.

Mary Had a Little Lamb may also refer to:

- "Mary Had a Little Lamb" (Wings song), 1972
- "Mary Had a Little Lamb", a 1968 song by Buddy Guy from A Man and the Blues
  - covered by Stevie Ray Vaughan & Double Trouble on Texas Flood, 1983
- "Mary Had a Little Lamb", a 2001 song by Garth Brooks from Songs from Call Me Claus
- Mary Had a Little Lamb, a painting by Edith Susan Gerard Anderson
- "Mary Had a Little Lamb", an episode of Teletubbies

== See also ==
- Mary Had a Little..., a 1962 British comedy film
- Marykkundoru Kunjaadu (Mary Had a Little Lamb), a 2010 Malayalam film
