= Taylor Negron =

American actor (1957–2015)

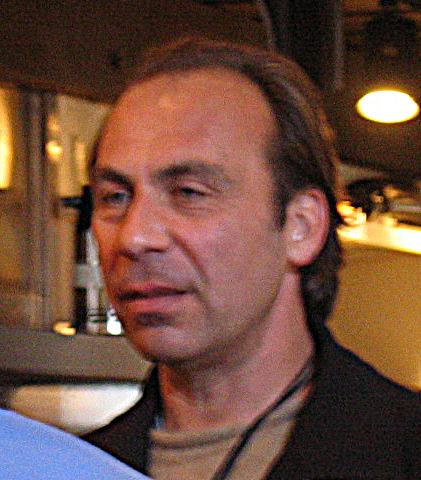
- Negron in 2005
- Born: Brad Stephen Negron; August 1, 1957; Glendale, California, U.S.
- Died: January 10, 2015 (aged 57); Los Angeles, California
- Occupations: Actor; comedian; writer; artist
- Years active: 1975–2015
- Relatives: Chuck Negron (cousin)

Brad Stephen "Taylor" Negron (August 1, 1957 – January 10, 2015) was an American actor, comedian, writer and artist. He is known for his roles as Albert in Punchline (1988); Milo in the 1991 action comedy The Last Boy Scout; and David in Angels in the Outfield (1994).

== Early life ==
Brad Stephen Negron was born on August 1, 1957 in Glendale, California, the son of Jewish-Puerto Rican couple Lucy (née Rosario) and Conrad Negron Sr. His cousin was singer and musician Chuck Negron, of Three Dog Night fame. He grew up in La Cañada Flintridge, California, and graduated from the University of California Los Angeles.

== Career ==
=== Breaking into comedy, Hollywood ===
Negron's career in comedy began while he was still in high school, with a stand-up performance at the Comedy Store in West Hollywood. After this appearance, Negron ventured into being a Hollywood extra, as well as a repeat contestant on Chuck Barris' ABC daytime show The Dating Game.

Before his film career began, Negron worked for dramatic and comedic legends Lee Strasberg and Lucille Ball. In a work-study program at the Actors Studio, Negron worked as Strasberg's assistant. At Sherwood Oaks Experimental College in 1977, Negron served as Ball's intern while she was a guest teacher at the school.

=== Film ===
Negron's motion picture appearances included Angels in the Outfield, The Aristocrats, Better Off Dead, Call Me Claus, Easy Money as the tenacious son-in-law of Rodney Dangerfield's character, Fast Times at Ridgemont High, River's Edge, The Last Boy Scout, Nothing but Trouble, Punchline, The Stoned Age, Stuart Little, Young Doctors in Love, Funky Monkey, Bio-Dome with Pauly Shore, How I Got into College, and Vamps, in which he reprised his Fast Times at Ridgemont High pizza delivery scene.

=== Television and internet ===
Among Negron's television appearances are guest star roles on Hill Street Blues, That's So Raven, So Little Time, The Fresh Prince of Bel-Air, The Ben Stiller Show, Curb Your Enthusiasm, Reno 911!, Friends, My Wife and Kids, Seinfeld, Zoey 101, ER, Party of Five, and Falcon Crest. In addition to being a semiregular guest on Off Beat Cinema, he co-starred in Smart Guy and Wizards of Waverly Place. He appeared in Comedy Central's UnCabaret special as well as its Amazon episodes. He appeared as Melinda Hill's date in one episode of the 2013 web series Romantic Encounters. His last television role was the part of an acting coach in Season 1, Episode 5 of The Comedians starring Billy Crystal and Josh Gad. He also appeared on an episode of The Dating Game on March 16, 1970.

=== Writer ===
In 2008, he wrote The Unbearable Lightness of Being Taylor Negron – A Fusion of Story and Song, directed by opera director David Schweitzer and co-starring singer/songwriter Logan Heftel. The show debuted to critical acclaim in the Green Room at the Edinburgh Comedy Festival. It also ran in the 2009 Best of New York Solo Festival at the SoHo Playhouse and at the Barrow Street Theatre. Kate Copstick of The Scotsman wrote of it, "The underlying theme of this spellbinding hour seems to be Nietzschean – 'that which does not destroy me makes me strong'. And if that doesn't sound like out-and-out comedy, then that is good. Because the show is not out-and-out comedy. It is a mix of music, storytelling, and comedy." His comedy essays have been published in the anthology Dirty Laundry (Phoenix Books) and Love West Hollywood: Reflections of Los Angeles (Alyson Books).

Director Justin Tanner revived Negron's play Gangster Planet, a four-character domestic comedy set during the 1992 Los Angeles riots, which was chosen by the Los Angeles Times as a Critic's Choice. Another play, Downward Facing Bitch, a suspense comedy, was developed with director Kiff Scholl. Negron was a regular contributor to Wendy Hammer's Tasty Words, Jill Solloway's "Sit and Spin", and Hilary Carlip's online magazine Fresh Yarns, as well as the Huffington Post. He performed regularly across the United States and was one of the original members of the UnCabaret, dubbed "The Mother Show of Alternative Comedy" by the LA Weekly, where Negron fused standup, dada poetry, and stream of consciousness storytelling.

=== Painter ===
Negron was an accomplished painter whose artwork has been featured in solo exhibitions at venues such as Los Angeles' Laemmle Royal Theater and the Hotel de Ville Lifestyle. Although he left his initial art school education when he was 19 years old, Negron later received training at the Academy of Fine Arts in San Francisco and the Art Students League in New York City. His work was influenced by Henri Matisse, Jean-Édouard Vuillard, Don Bachardy, and David Hockney.

== Personal life and death ==
Negron was a gay man.

Negron was diagnosed with liver cancer in 2008. On January 10, 2015, he died at his home in Los Angeles, California at the age of 57.

== Filmography ==
=== Credits ===
Year	Title	Role	Notes
1980	The Gong Show Movie	Blond-Haired Man Auditioning	Uncredited
1981	Freedom	Brett	
1982	Young Doctors in Love	Dr. Phil Burns	
1982	Fast Times at Ridgemont High	Pizza Guy	
1983	Easy Money	Julio Ocampo	
1984	Johnny Dangerously	Delivery Man	Uncredited
1985	Better Off Dead	Mailman	
1985	Bad Medicine	Pepe The Cab Driver	
1986	One Crazy Summer	Taylor	
1986	The Whoopee Boys	'Whitey'	
1986	River's Edge	Checker	
1988	Punchline	Albert Emperato	
1989	How I Got into College	Mailman	
1991	Nothing but Trouble	Fausto Squiriniszu	
1991	The Last Boy Scout	Milo	
1993	Mr. Jones	Motorcycle Man / Director of Rock Videos	
1994	Angels in the Outfield	David Montagne	
1994	The Stoned Age	Clerk	
1996	Bio-Dome	Russell	
1997	A Kid in Aladdin's Palace	The Genie	
1997	The Practice	Mr. Walters	Episode: "Reasonable Doubts"
1997	Friends	Allesandro	Episode: "The One Where They're Going to Party!"
1998	Chairman of the Board	Mr. Withermeyer	
1999	Stuart Little	Salesman In Mall	
2000	Gun Shy	Cheemo Partelle	
2000	The Flintstones in Viva Rock Vegas	Gazaam & Gazing	
2001	Call Me Claus	Ralph	
2005	The Aristocrats	Himself	
2007	Entry Level	Charlie	
2007	Wizards of Waverly Place	Dragon Seller	
2007	Three Days to Vegas	Antoine	
2008	Channels	Niles	
2009	Super Capers	Chauffeur	
2009	Lock and Roll Forever	Mary Post	
2009	The Deported	Priest	
2009	Stuntmen	Gio Supreme	
2009	Scream of the Bikini	Doorman	
2009	Babysitters Beware	Mr. Willoughsbag	
2010	Shoot the Hero!	Douglas	
2010	The Braveheart Musical: For England	King Edward I Longshanks	Short
2010	Change Your Life	LOOT Sales Rep	Video
2010	Evil Shrink	Dr. Bane	Video short
2011	The Chateau Meroux	Francois	
2012	Freight	Robert	Short
2012	Vamps	Pizza Guy	
2013	Santorini Blue	Jimmy the Doorman	
2013	Scott & Kassie's Christmas Adventure	Marv	
2014	The Magic World of Harrison Patrakis	Narrator	Short
2015	Alienated	Griffin	Posthumous release; Final film role

=== Video games ===
Year	Title	Role	Notes
1993	Double Switch	Sammy "Slick Sammy"	
