= Jerry Ross Barrish =

American artist (born 1939)

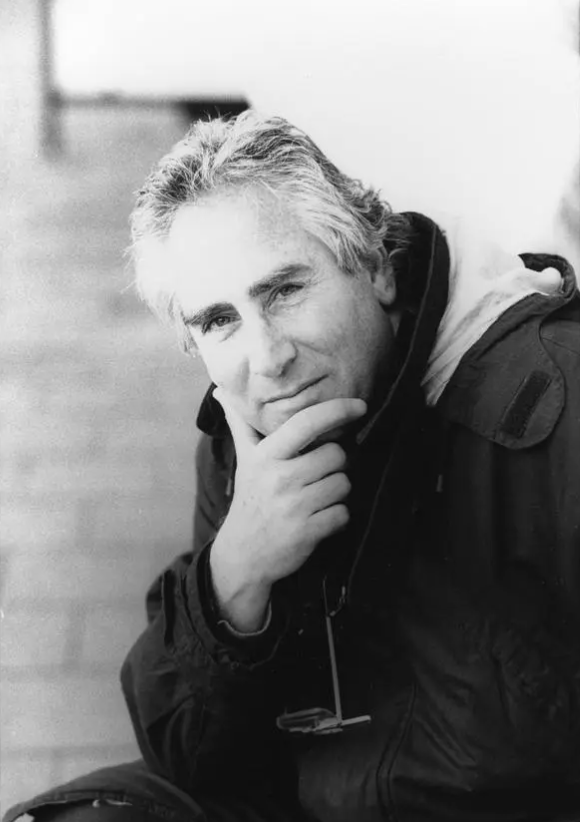
Jerry Ross Barrish

Jerry Ross Barrish (born July 23, 1939) is an American visual artist, known for his filmmaking and found object assemblage sculpture. He lives in Pacifica, California, and maintains his art studio in San Francisco.

== Early life ==
Jerry Ross Barrish was born on July 23, 1939 in San Francisco, California. He grew up in a Jewish family. He apprenticed as a sculptor with C.B. (Charles Betram) Johnson (1914–1996) in the late 1960s in Bernal Heights, San Francisco. Barrish served in the United States Army, and had G.I. Bill benefits.

Barrish received a BFA degree (1974) and a MFA degree (1976) in filmmaking from the San Francisco Art Institute, where he studied with James Broughton and George Kuchar.

In 1961, he worked worked as a bail bondsman and created a successful bail bonds business. He posted bail for protesters jailed during many now-iconic social movements including 1964's Auto Row Protests, Berkeley's Free Speech Movement of 1964–1965, the San Francisco State University Strike (Third World Liberation Front Strikes) of 1968–1969, amongst others. His bail bonds company closed in 2013.

== Career ==
=== Film ===
His first feature-length film, Dan's Motel (1981) was selected for New Directors, New Films at NYC Lincoln Center and screened at Berkeley Art Museum and Pacific Film Archive. His second independent feature was Recent Sorrows (1984) which gained him access to the prestigious DAAD (Deutscher Akademischer Austauschdienst) program in 1986. Upon his return to the United States, he shot his final film Shuttlecock (1989).

In Berlin, Barrish was cast in the role of an American director in Wim Wenders' Palme d'Or winning Wings of Desire (1987). Barrish also acted in Until the End of the World (1991), also directed by Wenders, Rembrandt Laughing (1991), written and directed by Jon Jost, and I Married a Heathen (1974) directed by George Kuchar. He is the star of a documentary, Plastic Man: The Artful Life of Jerry Barrish (2014) directed by William Farley which details his practice and life story.

In 2025, Berkeley Art Museum and Pacific Film Archive acquired Barrish's 3 features, and the "Plastic Man" documentary, into their archives.

=== Found object assemblage ===
In 1988, Barrish shifted his focus back to sculpture, creating assemblages using plastic found materials. He has amassed a large body of work in found object assemblage spanning from 1988 to present. Select notable works have been reborn into bronze sculptures.

In 2018, Barrish moved his studio to Bartlett Street in the Mission District, San Francisco.

His work is in museum collections, including at the Oakland Museum of California, the Berkeley Art Museum and Pacific Film Archive, the Crocker Art Museum, and the San José Museum of Art.

=== Public art ===
Bayview Horn is located at The Shipyard SF at Hunters Point. It was commissioned by San Francisco Office of Community Investment and Infrastructure (successor to San Francisco Redevelopment Agency).
