= David Claessen =

Dutch director and cinematographer

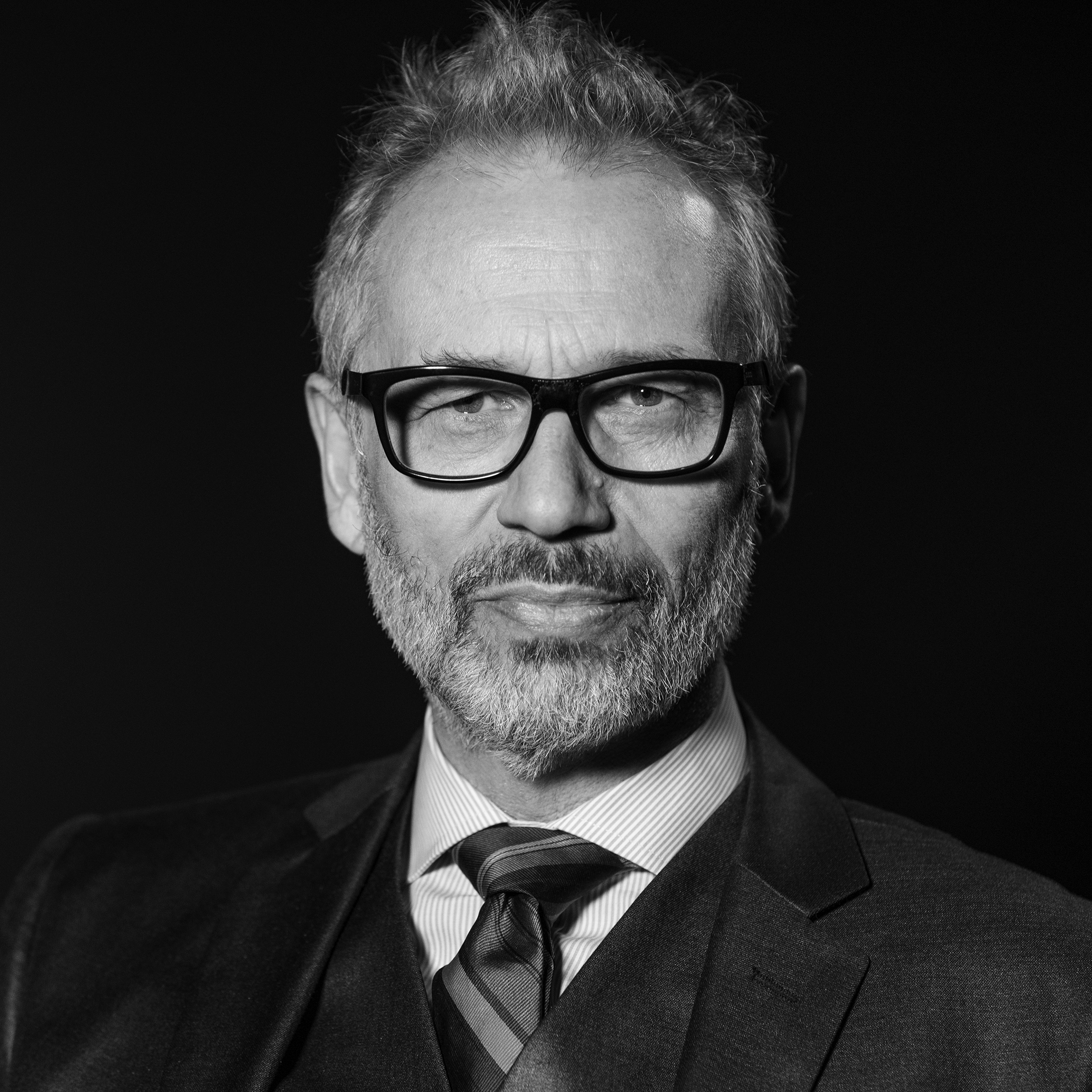
- Claessen in 2019
- Born: Haarlem, Netherlands
- Occupations: Film director, cinematographer
- Years active: 1985–present
- Notable work: The Rosa Parks Story; Diary of a Mad Black Woman
- Spouses: Whoopi Goldberg (m. 1986; div. 1988) Karen Green (m. 1992; div. 2002) Taiye Selasi (m. 2013; div. 2015)
- Website: davidclaessen.com

David Claessen is a Dutch film director and cinematographer.

== Biography ==
In 1983, Claessen shot Haute Mer, directed by French filmmaker Edgardo Cozarinsky.

In 1997, Claessen met director Julie Dash. They have collaborated on four films together: including the award-winning The Rosa Parks Story, Love Song (2000), Brothers of the Borderland (2004), and Travel Notes of a Geechee Girl (2016).

In 1986, Claessen moved to the United States, where he met Whoopi Goldberg during production of the documentary Who Are They?. They married in September 1986 and divorced two years later.
