= Call Me Claus =

2001 American television film by Peter Werner

- Genre: Comedy
- Teleplay by: Sara Bernstein; Gregory Bernstein; Brian Bird
- Story by: Paul Mooney; Sara Bernstein; Gregory Bernstein
- Directed by: Peter Werner
- Starring: Whoopi Goldberg; Nigel Hawthorne; Brian Stokes Mitchell; Victor Garber; Taylor Negron; Frankie R. Faison; Alexandra Wentworth; Melody Garrett; Robert Costanzo
- Music by: Van Dyke Parks
- Country of origin: United States
- Original language: English

Production
- Executive producers: Whoopi Goldberg; Lisa Sanderson; Garth Brooks
- Producers: Tom Leonardis; Jay Benson
- Cinematography: Neil Roach
- Editor: Benjamin A. Weissman
- Running time: 90 minutes
- Production companies: Red Strokes Entertainment; One Ho Productions; Columbia TriStar Television

Original release
- Network: TNT
- Release: December 2, 2001

Call Me Claus is a 2001 American Christmas comedy television film directed by Peter Werner and starring Whoopi Goldberg and Nigel Hawthorne. The film involves Santa Claus (Hawthorne) who needs a replacement Santa after serving his 200-year reign. He decides on Lucy Cullins (Goldberg), an eccentric, grouchy shopping network executive, who hires him to promote Christmas decorations and presents on the network. The film was produced by Red Strokes Entertainment, One Ho Productions and Columbia TriStar Television and premiered on TNT on December 2, 2001, and was also released on VHS and DVD by Columbia TriStar Home Entertainment. The film has since been reran on Lifetime, Freeform and The Hallmark Channel.

== Plot ==
In 1965 in Los Angeles, Lucy Cullins, her brother and her mother go to a shopping mall to see Santa Claus, who happens to be the real one and is nearing the end of his 200-year reign as St. Nick, and is seeking a replacement. When Lucy sits on his lap, he places the hat on her and it glows brightly, proving she would make a perfect Santa Claus replacement. Unfortunately, after leaving the mall, Lucy receives news that her father has been killed. Devastated, she begins to lose faith in the Christmas Spirit.

In the present day, Lucy, now grown into a cynical woman, has become more invested with her job as a network executive for the "Shop-A-Lot" Channel than her family. Meanwhile, Nick, who is spending his last Christmas as Santa, locates Lucy again and finds the opportunity to get close to her after hearing that the "Shop-A-Lot" is holding auditions to cast a Santa Claus to advertise Christmas memorabilia and increase the sales boost for the holiday. After nearly giving up hope of finding a good Claus, Lucy comes across Nick and reluctantly hires him, oblivious to the fact that he was the Santa from her past.

In Nick's first few days at work, calls come in big numbers and the network sells more Christmas stuff than any other shopping network. After congratulations and a salary raise, Nick couldn't be happier. He walks around the once-unpleasant community and begins to see the Christmas spirit for which he long hoped. Within time, Nick cultures a close friendship with Lucy. He begins to tell her about his reign and his choosing her as a successor, explaining if he doesn't find a successor, a giant flood will engulf the world, adding that that was the reason for the Noah's Ark story. Lucy finds the story ridiculous and tries to stay away from him.

One night, Nick goes to her house and tells her truthfully about his search. He tells her to close her eyes. When she opens them, she finds herself with Nick at the North Pole. Unbelievably still unconvinced, Lucy demands Nick to send her home. Nick does so, and she wakes up thinking the North Pole had been a dream. Seeing Nick on the couch, she starts to tell him about the dream. Nick interrupts her to tell her it wasn't, and begs her again to put on the Santa hat and become Santa Claus. Lucy still adamantly refuses.

Nick makes his final broadcast on Christmas Eve. In his closing statement, he says to never give up on Christmas spirit, and wishes everyone good luck, leading Lucy to ponder his last statement. After receiving a big thanks from the staff, Nick begins to head back to the North Pole without a successor and prepare for the flood with the elves. Before leaving, he sets the hat on Lucy's dresser, with a note that says it's never too late.

When Lucy gets a ride back home from her boss, she starts to believe what Nick said about Christmas, and her potential role as Santa. Realizing her boss just wants money and the power over Christmas, Lucy tells him to pull over, saying that no one owns Christmas. Upon arriving home, she finds the hat and the note. Curious, Lucy puts the hat on and it glows brightly. She realizes that she really is Santa.

Back at the North Pole, the elves preparing for the worst. Suddenly, one of the elves sees through a snow globe of Lucy wearing the hat. Once Ralph hears about it, he and Nick go to pick up Lucy. Lucy runs out of her apartment and finds Ralph and Santa in the cab. She goes inside and instantly transforms into Santa. For the first couple of houses, Nick helps Lucy go down the chimney and deliver the toys. Before they continue, Lucy tells Ralph to stop the sled and go to a church, where her niece is performing in the choir. When she arrives, she catches her niece's solo, and congratulates her, her brother, and her mom. Seeing her Santa suit, they seem puzzled. Suddenly, it starts to snow in LA. With surprised faces, people run outside, and see the sleigh. Lucy's family begins to realize she is Santa. After Lucy says goodbye to everyone and her family, she, Nick and Ralph go up and away into the Christmas night.

== Cast ==
- Whoopi Goldberg as Lucy Cullins
- Nigel Hawthorne as Nick
- Brian Stokes Mitchell as Cameron
- Victor Garber as Taylor
- Taylor Negron as Ralph
- Frankie R. Faison as Dwayne
- Alexandra Wentworth as Lilly
- Melody Garrett as Mama
- Robert Costanzo as Teamster Santa
- Ed Gale as Benson
- Jazmn as Iesha
- Tinashe Kachingwe as Young Lucy Cullins
- Richard Moll as Brooding Santa
- Bruce Vilanch as Himself
- Allyce Beasley as Telemarketer
- Patti Tippo as Barmaid
- Grant Vaught as James
- Robert Jackson as Jeff
- Juan Carlos Cantu as Doorman
- Michael .rancis Kelly as Military Man
- Henry G. Sanders as Minister
- Kip King as Rabbi Rosenfarb
- Kym Washington as Stunt Double - Lucy
- Alex Martin as Woman #1
- Nicholas Barb as Boy Onlooker
- Steve Murphy as Elvis Santa
- Carter Spohn as Charity Santa

== Production ==
In January 2001, it was announced that Whoopi Goldberg would star in the film with Garth Brooks providing original music. Filming took place in Los Angeles.

== See also ==
- Songs from Call Me Claus
- List of American films of 2001
- List of Christmas films
- Santa Claus in film
