= Garth Brooks & the Magic of Christmas =

Studio album by Garth Brooks
- Released: November 23, 1999
- Studio: Jack's Tracks (Nashville, Tennessee); Sound Emporium (Nashville, Tennessee)
- Genre: Christmas
- Length: 42:53
- Label: Capitol Nashville
- Producer: Allen Reynolds

Garth Brooks chronology
Garth Brooks...In the Life of Chris Gaines (1999)	Garth Brooks & the Magic of Christmas (1999)	Songs from Call Me Claus (2001)

Professional ratings
Review scores
Source	Rating
AllMusic	2/5 stars
The Austin Chronicle	2/5 stars
Chicago Tribune	(positive)
Entertainment Weekly	C−
The Rolling Stone Album Guide	1/5 stars

Garth Brooks & the Magic of Christmas is the second Christmas album by American country music artist Garth Brooks. It was released on November 23, 1999, peaked at number seven on the Billboard 200 chart, and number one on the Top Country Albums chart. Two years after this album's release, Brooks released a reissue of this album, Songs from Call Me Claus, which contained most of the songs from this release. The only tracks which were not carried over were "White Christmas", "God Rest Ye Merry, Gentlemen", and "Go Tell It on the Mountain" (all of which are remixed versions of the same songs from his first Christmas album, Beyond the Season).

== Track listing ==
1. "It's the Most Wonderful Time of the Year" (Edward Pola, George Wyle) – 2:57
2. "Let It Snow! Let It Snow! Let It Snow!" (Sammy Cahn, Jule Styne) – 2:06
3. "The Christmas Song" (Mel Tormé, Bob Wells) – 3:25
4. "White Christmas" (Irving Berlin) – 2:58
5. "Baby Jesus Is Born" (Randy Handley, Cam King) – 3:59
6. "God Rest Ye Merry, Gentlemen" (traditional) – 2:35
7. "Winter Wonderland" (Felix Bernard, Richard B. Smith) – 3:33
8. "Sleigh Ride" (Leroy Anderson, Mitchell Parish) – 3:27
9. "Have Yourself a Merry Little Christmas" (Ralph Blane, Hugh Martin) – 4:05
10. "(There's No Place Like) Home for the Holidays (Robert Allen, Al Stillman) – 2:18
11. "Silver Bells" (Ray Evans, Jay Livingston) – 3:34
12. "Go Tell It on the Mountain" (traditional, work) – 3:25
13. "The Wise Men's Journey" [instrumental] (Bobby Wood) – 1:28
14. "O Little Town of Bethlehem" (Phillips Brooks, Lewis Redner) – 3:03

== Personnel ==
=== Musicians ===
- Garth Brooks – vocals, arrangements (6, 12, 14)
- Bobby Wood – keyboards
- Blair Masters – Hammond B3 organ (5, 12)
- Mark Casstevens – acoustic guitars
- Chris Leuzinger – electric guitars
- Mike Chapman – bass
- Milton Sledge – drums
- Sam Bacco – percussion
- Dennis Burnside – horn arrangements, string arrangements, conductor
- Mark Douthit – saxophones, woodwinds
- Don Jackson – saxophones, woodwinds
- Sam Levine – saxophones, woodwinds
- Doug Moffet – saxophones, woodwinds
- Denis Solee – saxophones, woodwinds
- Ernie Collins – trombone
- Chris Dunn – trombone
- Robert Green – trombone
- Chris McDonald – trombone
- Jeff Bailey – trumpet, flugelhorn
- Mike Haynes – trumpet, flugelhorn
- Steve Patrick – trumpet, flugelhorn
- George Tidwell – trumpet, flugelhorn
- Carl Gorodetzky – string contractor
- The Nashville String Machine – strings
- Bergen White – choir arrangements, conductor
- The Bergen White Choir – choir

=== Production ===
- Allen Reynolds – producer
- Mark Miller – recording, mixing
- Matt Andrews – recording assistant
- Duke Duczer – recording assistant, mix assistant
- Eric Conn – digital editing
- Carlos Grier – digital editing
- Denny Purcell – mastering
- Jonathan Russell – mastering assistant
- Carlton Davis – production manager
- Denise Jarvis – production managing assistant
- Virginia Team – art direction
- Jerry Joyner – design
- Beverly Parker – photography
- Harris Graphics – digital imagery
- Mary Beth Felts – hair, make-up

== Chart performance ==
Garth Brooks & the Magic of Christmas peaked at number seven on the U.S. Billboard 200 and number one on the Top Country Albums chart, his 10th number-one album.

=== Weekly charts ===
Chart (1999)	Peak position
U.S. Billboard 200	7
U.S. Billboard Top Country Albums	1

=== Singles ===
Year	Single	US Country
2000	"Sleigh Ride"	54
2000	"The Most Wonderful Time of the Year"	56
2000	"There's No Place Like Home for the Holidays"	63
2000	"White Christmas"	65
2000	"God Rest Ye Merry Gentlemen"	69
2000	"Baby Jesus Is Born"	75

=== Year-end charts ===
Chart (2001)	Position
Canadian Country Albums (Nielsen SoundScan)	56

=== Sales and certifications ===
Region	Certification	Certified units/sales
Canada (Music Canada)	Gold	50,000^{^}
United States (RIAA)	Platinum	1,000,000^{^}
^{^} Shipments figures based on certification alone.
