= William Farley (director) =

American film director

- Education: Maryland Institute College of Art
- Occupations: Film director; screenwriter
- Years active: 1970–present

William Farley is an American film director. He directed Whoopi Goldberg in her first screen role, in Citizen: I'm Not Losing My Mind, I'm Giving It Away (1981–1982).

== Biography ==
William Farley was raised in Braintree, Massachusetts, on Boston's south shore in a working-class family. His early life included training as a commercial artist and as a sculptor. Drafted by the U.S. Army, Farley worked as an illustrator for an intelligence unit.

Farley's first film was made in 1970. As a graduate student majoring in sculpture he took a class on the history of film. At the end of the semester, he had the choice to either write a paper about the films he saw or make a film. The film was a hit on the film festival circuit and Farley was hooked. When he received his MFA a year and a half later he had more credits in filmmaking than sculpture.

== Career ==
Farley's first feature film, Citizen: I'm Not Losing My Mind, I'm Giving It Away, made on maxed-out credit cards, premiered at the Sundance Film Festival in 1983. The film is an anarchic look at society as a group of anonymous youths roam the San Francisco cityscape. Featured at the Whitney Museum of American Art, Citizen included, among other West Coast performance artists such as Stoney Burke, playwright John O'Keefe and Whoopi Goldberg in her first screen performance.

Farley directed his second feature, Of Men and Angels, from a screenplay he co-wrote, starring Theresa Saldana and John Molloy of Dublin's Abbey Theatre. The film tells the story of three strong-willed individuals who struggle for control of their own dreams and each other's. In 1989, Of Men and Angels premiered in the dramatic competition at the Sundance Film Festival.

Farley's next film was broke, a meditation on street people and showed in over a dozen film festivals in the United States and Europe. In 1998, Mr. Farley's poignant short film Sea Space, completed in 1972, was blown up to 35mm and shown at the Sundance Film Festival, New York Film Festival and won first prize at the Mannheim Film Festival.

In the spring of 2001, he co-directed The Old Spaghetti Factory, a documentary film about the Old Spaghetti Factory, the last bohemian nightclub in San Francisco's North Beach. The film was shown on PBS in over one hundred U.S. cities. This film was a collaboration between Farley, Mal Sharpe, and Sandra Sharpe.

Farley's many short films and documentaries have won numerous awards and have been broadcast and screened at venues around the world, including the Sundance, Berlin, Chicago, Sydney, and New York film festivals.

== Filmography (as director) ==
=== Feature films ===
- Citizen: I'm Not Losing My Mind, I'm Giving It Away (1981–1982), 16mm
- Of Men and Angels (1989)

=== Documentaries ===
- Plastic Man, the Artful Life of Jerry Ross Barrish (2014) premiered at Mill Valley Film Festival, about artist Jerry Ross Barrish
- Shadow and Light: The life and Art of Elaine Badgley Arnoux (2011), about visual artist Elaine Badgley Arnoux
- John O'Keefe's Adaptation of Walt Whitman's Song Of Myself (2007)
- Arianna’s Journey: A Pilgrimage of Faith (2007)
- Darryl Henriques Is in Show Business (2006)
- The Old Spaghetti Factory (1999–2000)
- In Between The Notes (1985–1986)

=== Short films ===
- The Stories (2005)
- broke (1995/ remastered 2004)
- Tribute (1986)
- Become an Artist (1982)
- Made for Television (1981)
- Marathain (1977-79/ remastered 2002)
- The Bell Rang to an Empty Sky (1976–77)
- Being (1974–75)
- Sea Space (1972/remastered 1997)
