= The Whoopi Goldberg Show =

American late night talk show

- Presented by: Whoopi Goldberg
- Country of origin: United States
- Original language: English

Production
- Running time: 30 minutes

The Whoopi Goldberg Show is an American late-night talk show hosted by comedian Whoopi Goldberg that aired in syndication from September 1992 through September 1993 for a total of 112 normal episodes for a 30-minute timeslot Monday through Friday nights (in some markets after 12 AM). The show did not have a band, but Jerry Peters played piano.
