= Whoopi Goldberg =

American actor and comedian (born 1955)

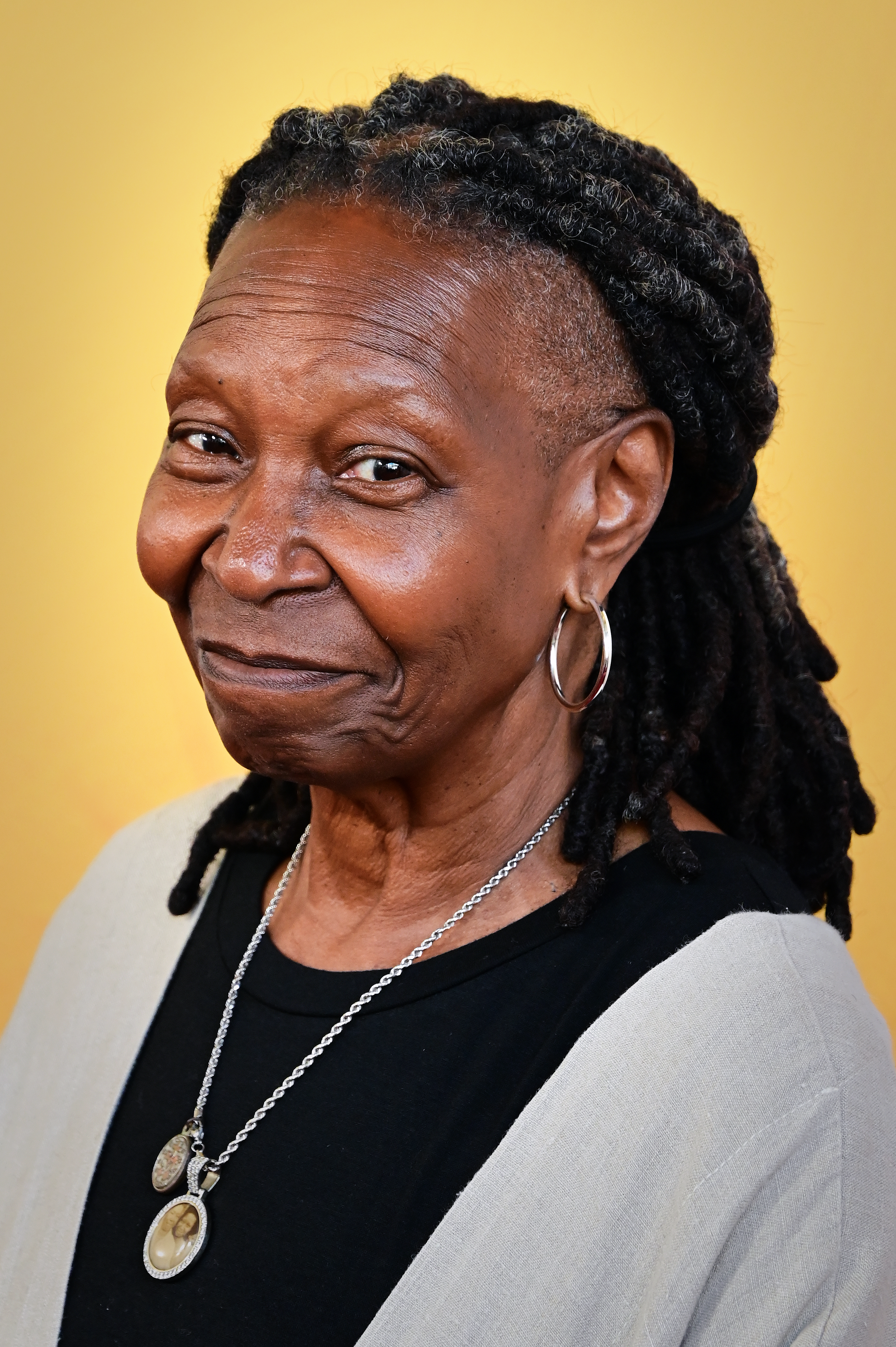
- Goldberg in 2026
- Born: Caryn Elaine Johnson; November 13, 1955 (age 71); New York City, U.S.
- Occupations: Actor; comedian; author; television personality
- Years active: 1982–present
- Works: Full list
- Spouses: Alvin Martin (m. 1973; div. 1979) David Claessen (m. 1986; div. 1988) Lyle Trachtenberg (m. 1994; div. 1995)
- Partners: David Schein (1980–1985); Frank Langella (1995–2000)
- Children: Alexandrea Martin
- Awards: Full list

Comedy career
- Medium: Stand-up; film; television; theater; books
- Genres: Observational; black; surreal humor; character; satire
- Subjects: African-American culture; American politics; race relations; racism; marriage; sex; everyday life; popular culture; current events
- Whoopi Goldberg's voice From the BBC program Desert Island Discs, May 10, 2009

Caryn Elaine Johnson (born November 13, 1955), known professionally as Whoopi Goldberg (/ˈwʊpi/), is an American actor, comedian, author, and television personality. She is one of 28 entertainers to receive the EGOT, consisting of an Emmy, a Grammy, an Oscar (Academy Award), and a Tony Award. Her other accolades include a BAFTA and two Golden Globes. She received a star on the Hollywood Walk of Fame in 2001, the Mark Twain Prize for American Humor in 2010, and the Disney Legend Award in 2017.

Goldberg began her career on stage with a series of one-woman shows, and a recording of her Broadway show Whoopi Goldberg (1984–1985) won the Grammy Award for Best Comedy Album. For playing a mistreated woman in the Deep South in Steven Spielberg's period drama The Color Purple (1985), she won the Golden Globe Award for Best Actress and was nominated for the Academy Award for Best Actress. She followed this with leading roles in the comedy Jumpin' Jack Flash (1986) and the drama Clara's Heart (1988), and played Guinan in the science fiction series Star Trek: The Next Generation (1988–1993). Her portrayal of an eccentric psychic in the romantic fantasy Ghost (1990) won the Academy Award for Best Supporting Actress, making her the second African-American woman to win an Oscar.

Goldberg headlined the comedies Sister Act (1992) and its sequel Sister Act 2: Back in the Habit (1993), becoming the highest-paid actress at the time. She also acted in the comedies Soapdish (1991) and Corrina, Corrina (1994), the dramas Ghosts of Mississippi (1996) and Girl, Interrupted (1999), and voiced Shenzi the hyena in the animated feature The Lion King (1994). She returned to stage in the late 1990s, starring in revivals of Stephen Sondheim's musical A Funny Thing Happened on the Way to the Forum (2002) and August Wilson's play Ma Rainey's Black Bottom (2003), and winning the Tony Award for Best Musical for producing Thoroughly Modern Millie (2002).

Since 2007, Goldberg has co-hosted and moderated the daytime talk show The View, winning a Daytime Emmy Award for Outstanding Talk Show Host from ten nominations, and hosted the Academy Awards four times. She joined the stage adaptation of Sister Act (2011) as a performer and producer, and appeared in the animated film Toy Story 3 (2010) and the biographical drama Till (2022). She also reprised the role of Guinan in the series Star Trek: Picard (2022) and played Miss Hannigan in a revival of Annie (2025–2026).

== Early life, family and education ==
Caryn Elaine Johnson was born in Manhattan, New York City, on November 13, 1955, the daughter of Emma Johnson (née Harris), a nurse and teacher, and Robert James Johnson Jr., a Baptist clergyman. She was raised in a public housing project, the Chelsea-Elliot Houses, in New York City. She described her mother as a "stern, strong, and wise woman" who raised her as a single mother with her brother Clyde (c. 1949 – 2015). She was raised Catholic and attended St Columba's, a local parochial school in Manhattan. Her forebears migrated north from Faceville, Georgia; Palatka, Florida; and Virginia. She dropped out of Washington Irving High School. Goldberg has said that her family is "Jewish, Buddhist, Baptist, and Catholic."

Researcher Henry Louis Gates Jr. found that all of Goldberg's traceable ancestors were black, that she had no known Jewish ancestry, and that none of her ancestors were named Goldberg. Results of a DNA test, revealed in the 2006 PBS documentary African American Lives, traced part of her ancestry to the Papel and Bayote people of modern-day Guinea-Bissau of West Africa. The show identified her great-great-grandparents as William and Elsie Washington, who had acquired property in northern Florida in 1873, and mentions they were among a very small number of black people who became landowners through homesteading in the years following the Civil War. The show also mentions that her grandparents were living in Harlem, and that her grandfather worked as a Pullman porter.

In the 1970s, Goldberg moved to San Diego, California, where she worked as a waitress. Then she moved to Berkeley, where she worked odd jobs, including as a bank teller, a mortuary cosmetologist, and a bricklayer.

She joined the avant-garde theater troupe the Blake Street Hawkeyes and gave comedy and acting classes; Courtney Love was one of her acting students. Goldberg was also in a number of theater productions.

In 1978, she witnessed a midair collision of two planes in San Diego, causing her to develop a fear of flying and post-traumatic stress disorder.

== Career ==
=== 1980s: Early work and recognition ===
Goldberg trained under acting teacher Uta Hagen at the HB Studio in New York City. She first appeared onscreen in Citizen: I'm Not Losing My Mind, I'm Giving It Away (1982), an avant-garde ensemble feature by San Francisco filmmaker William Farley.

In 1983 and 1984, she "first came to national prominence with her one-woman show" in which she portrayed Moms Mabley, Moms, first performed in Berkeley, California, and then at the Victoria Theatre in San Francisco; the Oakland Museum of California preserves a poster advertising the show.

She created The Spook Show, a one-woman show composed of different character monologues in 1983. Director Mike Nichols "discovered" her when he saw her perform. In an interview, he recalled that he "burst into tears", and that he and Goldberg "fell into each other's arms" when they first met backstage. Goldberg considered Nichols her mentor. Nichols helped her transfer the show to Broadway, where it was retitled Whoopi Goldberg. The show ran from October 24, 1984, to March 10, 1985, and was taped and broadcast by HBO as Whoopi Goldberg: Direct from Broadway. The recording of the special was awarded the Grammy Award for Best Comedy Album, making Goldberg the first Black female comedian to win the Grammy.

Goldberg's Broadway performance caught the eye of director Steven Spielberg while she performed in The Belly Room at The Comedy Store. Spielberg gave her the lead role in his film The Color Purple, based on the novel by Alice Walker. It was released in late 1985, and was a critical and commercial success. Film critic Roger Ebert described Goldberg's performance as "one of the most amazing debut performances in movie history". It was nominated for 11 Academy Awards, including a nomination for Goldberg as Best Actress. She won the Golden Globe Award for Best Actress in a Motion Picture – Drama for her portrayal of Celie, becoming the first Black actress to win in this category.

Between 1985 and 1988, Goldberg was the busiest female star, making seven films. She starred in Penny Marshall's directorial debut Jumpin' Jack Flash (1986) and began a relationship with David Claessen, a director of photography on the set; they married later that year. The film was a modest success, and during the next two years, three additional motion pictures featured Goldberg: Burglar (1987), Fatal Beauty (1987), and The Telephone (1988). Though they were not as successful, Goldberg garnered awards from the NAACP Image Awards. Goldberg and Claessen divorced after the poor box office performance of The Telephone, in which she was contracted to perform. She tried unsuccessfully to sue the film's producers. Clara's Heart (1988) did poorly at the box office, though her own performance was critically acclaimed. She made a guest appearance in Michael Jackson's short film for the song "Liberian Girl". As the 1980s concluded, she hosted numerous HBO specials of Comic Relief with fellow comedians Robin Williams and Billy Crystal.

=== 1990s: Mainstream breakthrough ===
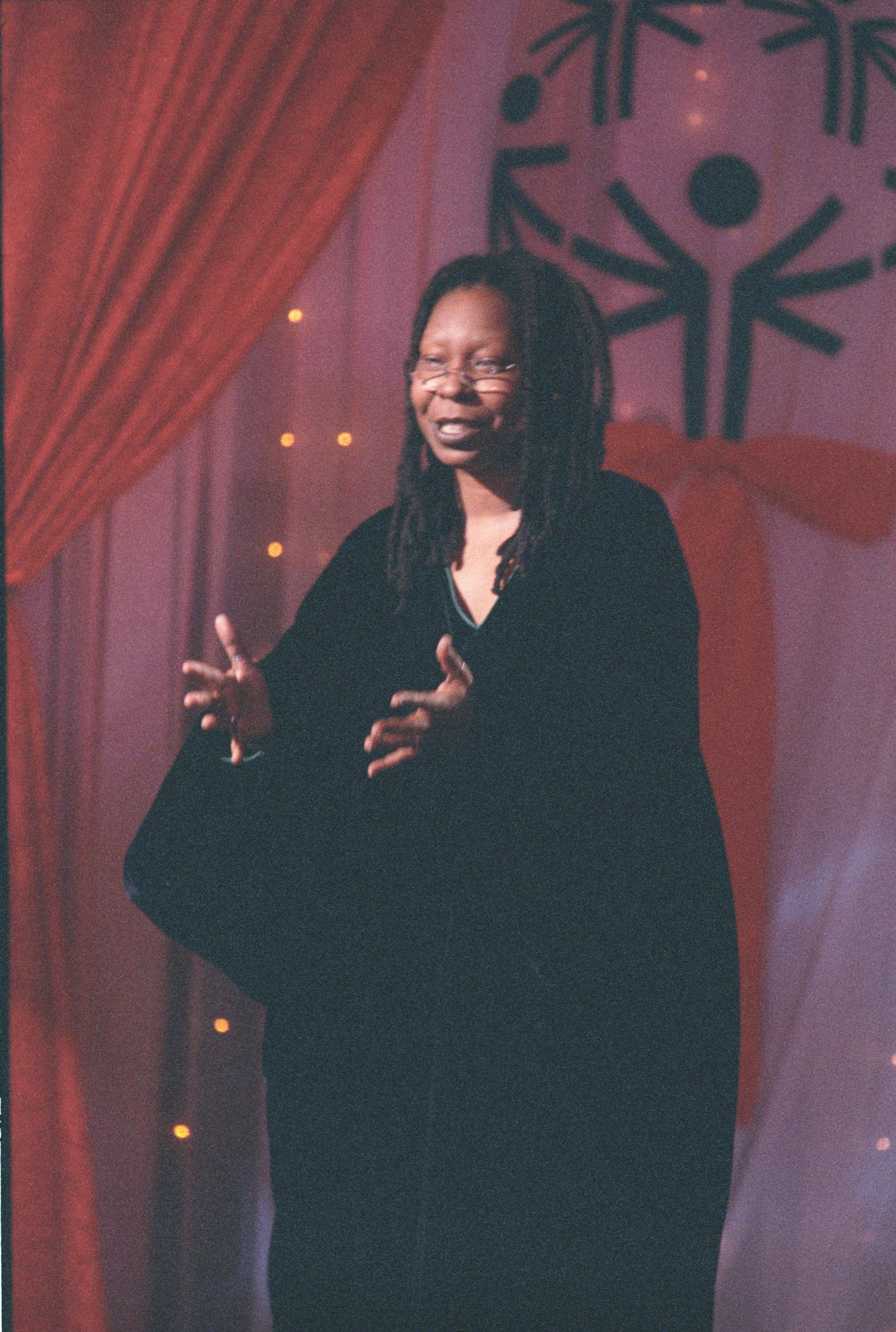
Goldberg performing at The White House in 1998

In January 1990, Goldberg starred with Jean Stapleton in the situation comedy Bagdad Cafe (inspired by the 1987 film of the same name). The sitcom ran for two seasons on CBS. Simultaneously, she starred in The Long Walk Home, portraying a woman in the US civil rights movement. She played a psychic in the film Ghost (1990) and became the first black woman to win the Academy Award for Best Supporting Actress in nearly 50 years, and the second black woman to win an Academy Award for acting (the first being Hattie McDaniel for Gone with the Wind in 1940). She also won the BAFTA Award for Best Actress in a Supporting Role and the Golden Globe Award for Best Supporting Actress – Motion Picture. Premiere named her character Oda Mae Brown in its list of Top 100 best film characters.

Goldberg starred in Soapdish (1991) and had a recurring role on Star Trek: The Next Generation between 1988 and 1993 as Guinan, a character she reprised in two Star Trek films. She made a cameo in the Traveling Wilburys 1991 music video "Wilbury Twist". On May 29, 1992, the film Sister Act was released. It grossed well over US$200 million (equivalent to $459 million in 2025), and Goldberg was nominated for a Golden Globe Award. That year, she starred in The Player and Sarafina! She also hosted the 34th Annual Grammy Awards, receiving praise from the Sun-Sentinel's Deborah Wilker for bringing to life what Wilker considered "stodgy and stale" ceremonies. During the next year, Goldberg hosted a late-night talk show, The Whoopi Goldberg Show, and starred in two more films: Made in America and Sister Act 2: Back in the Habit. With an estimated salary of $7–12 million for Sister Act 2: Back in the Habit (1993), she was the highest-paid actress at the time. From 1994 to 1995, she appeared in Corrina, Corrina, The Lion King (voice), Theodore Rex, The Little Rascals, The Pagemaster (voice), Boys on the Side, and Moonlight and Valentino, and guest-starred on Muppets Tonight in 1996.

In 1994, Goldberg became the first black woman to host the Academy Awards ceremony starting with the 66th Oscar telecast. She hosted it again in 1996, 1999, and 2002, and has been regarded as one of the show's best hosts. Goldberg starred in four motion pictures in 1996: Bogus (with Gérard Depardieu and Haley Joel Osment), Eddie, The Associate (with Dianne Wiest), and Ghosts of Mississippi (with Alec Baldwin and James Woods). During the filming of Eddie, she began dating co-star Frank Langella, a relationship that lasted until early 2000. In October 1997, she and ghostwriter Daniel Paisner cowrote Book, a collection featuring Goldberg's insights and opinions. Also in 1996, Goldberg replaced Nathan Lane as Pseudolus in the Broadway revival of Stephen Sondheim's musical comedy A Funny Thing Happened on the Way to the Forum. Greg Evans of Variety regarded her "thoroughly modern style" as "a welcome invitation to a new audience that could find this 1962 musical as dated as ancient Rome". The Washington Post's Chip Crews deemed Goldberg "a pip and a pro", and that she "ultimately [...] steers the show past its rough spots".

From 1998 to 2001, Goldberg took supporting roles in How Stella Got Her Groove Back with Angela Bassett, Girl, Interrupted with Winona Ryder and Angelina Jolie, Kingdom Come, and Rat Race with an all-star ensemble cast. She starred in the ABC versions of Cinderella and A Knight in Camelot. In 1998 she gained a new audience when she became the "Center Square" on Hollywood Squares, hosted by Tom Bergeron. She also served as executive producer, for which she was nominated for four Emmy Awards. She left the series in 2002. In 1999, she voiced Ransome in the British animated children's show Foxbusters by Cosgrove Hall Films. AC Nielsen EDI ranked her as the actress appearing in the most theatrical films in the 1990s, with 29 films grossing $1.3 billion in the U.S. and Canada (equivalent to $2 billion in 2025).

=== 2000s: Established actor and career expansion ===
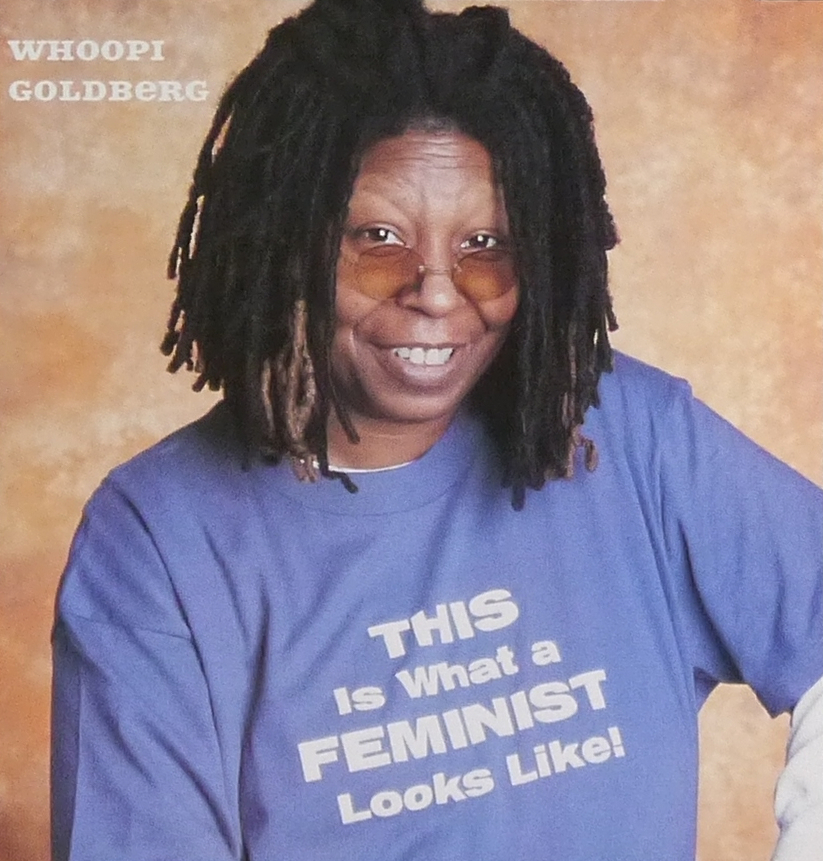
Goldberg on the Spring 2003 cover of Ms. magazine

Goldberg performed the role of Califia, the Queen of the Island of California, for a theater presentation called Golden Dreams at Disney California Adventure Park, the second gate at the Disneyland Resort, in 2000. The show, which explains the history of the Golden State (California), opened on February 8, 2001, with the rest of the park. Golden Dreams closed in September 2008 to make way for the upcoming Little Mermaid ride planned for DCA. In 2001, Goldberg co-hosted the 50th Anniversary of I Love Lucy, hosted the documentary short The Making of A Charlie Brown Christmas and later portrayed Death in Monkeybone.

In 2002, Goldberg completed the EGOT (Emmy, Grammy, Oscar, and Tony Awards) when she received the Daytime Emmy Award for Outstanding Special Class Special as a producer of Beyond Tara: The Extraordinary Life of Hattie McDaniel and the Tony Award for Best Musical for producing Thoroughly Modern Millie. She is the first Black woman to be an EGOT recipient.

Goldberg returned to the stage in 2003, starring as blues singer Ma Rainey in the Broadway revival of August Wilson's historical drama Ma Rainey's Black Bottom at the Royale Theatre. She was also one of the show's producers. Goldberg then returned to television in Whoopi, which was canceled after one season. On her 46th birthday, she was honored with a star on the Hollywood Walk of Fame. She also appeared alongside Samuel L. Jackson and Angela Bassett in the HBO documentary Unchained Memories (2003), narrating slave narratives.

During the next two years, she became a spokeswoman for the dietary supplement company Slim Fast and produced two television series: Lifetime's original drama Strong Medicine, which ran six seasons; and Whoopi's Littleburg, a children's television series on Nickelodeon.

Goldberg was involved in controversy at a fundraiser for John Kerry at Radio City Music Hall in New York in July 2004 when she made a sexual joke about President George W. Bush by waving a bottle of wine, pointed toward her pubic area, and said, "We should keep Bush where he belongs, and not in the White House." As result, Slim-Fast dropped her from their ad campaign. Later that year, she revived her one-woman show at the Lyceum Theatre on Broadway in honor of its 20th anniversary; Charles Isherwood of The New York Times called the opening night performance an "intermittently funny but sluggish evening of comic portraiture". Goldberg made guest appearances on Everybody Hates Chris as elderly character Louise Clarkson.

In July 2006, Goldberg became the main host of the Universal Studios Hollywood Studio Tour, in which she appears multiple times in video clips shown to the guests on monitors placed on the trams. From August 2006 to March 2008, Goldberg hosted Wake Up with Whoopi, a nationally syndicated morning radio talk and entertainment program. In October 2007, Goldberg announced on the air that she was going to retire from acting because she was no longer sent scripts, saying, "You know, there's no room for the very talented Whoopi. There's no room right now in the marketplace of cinema".

On December 13, 2008, she guest starred on The Naked Brothers Band, a Nickelodeon rock- mockumentary television series. Before the episode premiered, on February 18, 2008, the band performed on The View and the band members were interviewed by Goldberg and Sherri Shepherd. That same year, Goldberg hosted 62nd Tony Awards. Goldberg made a guest appearance on the situation comedy 30 Rock during the series' fourth season, in which she played herself, counseling Tracy Jordan on winning the "EGOT", the coveted combination of Emmy, Grammy, Oscar, and Tony Awards. On July 14, 2008, Goldberg announced on The View that from July 29 to September 7, she would perform in the Broadway musical Xanadu. On November 13, 2008, Goldberg's birthday, she announced live on The View that she would be producing, along with Stage Entertainment, the premiere of Sister Act: The Musical at the London Palladium.

=== 2010s: Television and stage focus ===
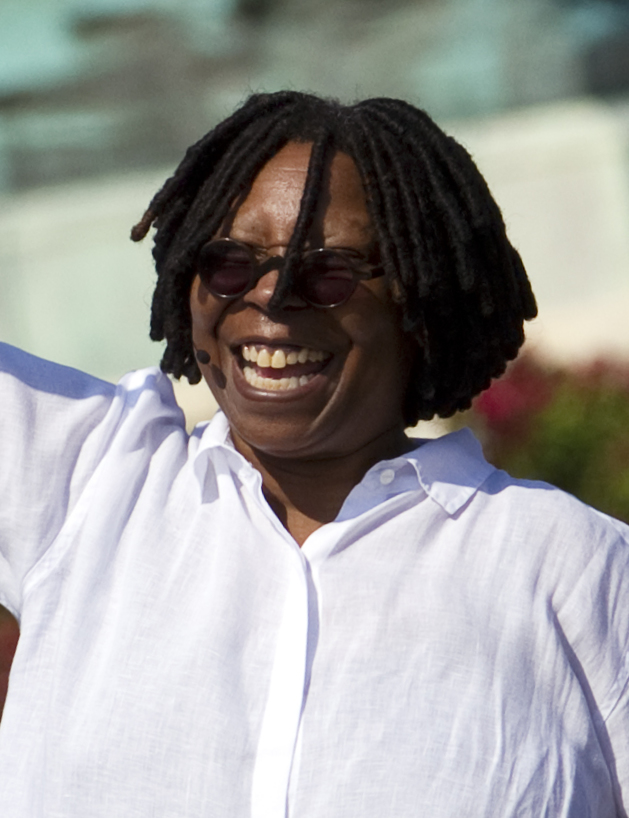
Goldberg in 2011

Goldberg has been a frequent guest narrator at Disney's Candlelight Processional at Walt Disney World. She also appeared on the seventh season of the cooking reality series Hell's Kitchen as a special guest. On January 14, 2010, Goldberg made a one-night-only appearance at the Minskoff Theatre to perform in the mega-hit musical The Lion King. That same year, she attended the Life Ball in Austria. In 2010, she starred in the Tyler Perry movie For Colored Girls, alongside Janet Jackson, Phylicia Rashad, Thandie Newton, Loretta Devine, Anika Noni Rose, Kimberly Elise, Kerry Washington, and Macy Gray. The film received generally good reviews from critics and grossed more than $38 million worldwide. The same year, she voiced Stretch in the Disney/Pixar animated movie Toy Story 3. The movie received critical acclaim and grossed $1.067 billion worldwide.

Goldberg made her West End debut as the Mother Superior in a musical version of Sister Act for a limited engagement set for August 10–31, 2010, but prematurely left the cast on August 27 to be with her family; her mother had had a severe stroke. However, she later returned to the cast for five performances. The show closed on October 30, 2010.

Goldberg had a recurring role on the television series Glee during its third and fourth seasons as Carmen Tibideaux, a renowned Broadway performer and opera singer and the dean at a fictional performing arts college NYADA (New York Academy of the Dramatic Arts). In 2011, she had a cameo in The Muppets. In 2012, Goldberg guest starred as Jane Marsh, Sue Heck's guidance counselor on The Middle. She voiced the Magic Mirror on Disney XD's The 7D. In 2014, she also portrayed a character in the superhero film Teenage Mutant Ninja Turtles (2014). She also appeared as herself in Chris Rock's Top Five and starred in the romantic comedy film Big Stone Gap.

In 2016, Goldberg executive produced a reality television series called Strut, based on transgender models from the modeling agency Slay Model Management in Los Angeles. The series aired on Oxygen. In 2017, she voiced Ursula, the Sea Witch and Uma's mother, in the TV movie Descendants 2. In 2018, she starred in the Tyler Perry's film Nobody's Fool, alongside Tiffany Haddish, Omari Hardwick, Mehcad Brooks, Amber Riley, and Tika Sumpter. That same year, she also starred in the comedy-drama film Furlough, alongside Tessa Thompson, Melissa Leo, and Anna Paquin. In 2019, Goldberg's voice was used for the role of the Giant's Wife in the Hollywood Bowl production of Into the Woods.

=== 2020s: Current work ===
In an appearance on The View on January 22, 2020, Patrick Stewart invited Goldberg to reprise her role as Guinan during the second season of Star Trek: Picard. She immediately accepted his offer. Goldberg also starred in The Stand, a CBS All Access miniseries based on the 1978 novel of the same name by Stephen King, portraying Mother Abagail, a 108-year-old woman. In 2020, it was announced Goldberg was set to return in Sister Act 3 with Tyler Perry producing. The film is slated to debut on Disney+.

Goldberg also stars in the biographical film Till (2021), written and directed by Chinonye Chukwu, which she also produced. The film focuses on abduction and lynching of Emmett Till with Goldberg playing Till's grandmother, Alma Carthan. The film debuted at the 60th New York Film Festival. Goldberg guest starred on the Disney Channel show Amphibia as the character Mother Olms. In 2023, she appeared in a cameo role in the musical film The Color Purple playing a midwife. She also took supporting roles in the drama Ezra (2023) and the western Outlaw Posse (2024).

Goldberg returned to the stage playing Miss Hannigan in the musical Annie as part of a limited engagement at The Theater at Madison Square Garden from December 4, 2024, to January 5, 2025. The New York Times praised Goldberg's performance, describing her as a "holiday gift", and adding: "In a just sweet enough production with a strong cast, the 'View' host delivers a performance that reaffirms her savvy as a comic actor." Patrick Ryan of USA Today agreed, writing: "[She] is perfectly prickly and altogether hilarious in her first stage acting role in more than 15 years."

Goldberg started filming the Italian soap opera un posto al sole on November 17, 2025, in a recurring role.

== Artistry ==
Goldberg has stated that her stage forename, Whoopi, was taken from a whoopee cushion: "When you're performing on stage, you never really have time to go into the bathroom and close the door. So if you get a little gassy, you've got to let it go. So people used to say to me, 'You're like a whoopee cushion.' And that's where the name came from." About her stage surname, she stated in 2011, "My mother did not name me Whoopi, but Goldberg is my name—it's part of my family, part of my heritage, just like being black," and "I just know I am Jewish. I practice nothing. I don't go to temple, but I do remember the holidays." She has stated that "people would say 'Come on, are you Jewish?' And I always say 'Would you ask me that if I was white? I bet not.'"

Goldberg's influences are Richard Pryor, George Carlin, Moms Mabley, Lenny Bruce, Joan Rivers, Eddie Murphy, Bill Cosby, Sidney Poitier, and Harry Belafonte. According to an anecdote told by Nichelle Nichols in Trekkies (1997), a young Goldberg was watching Star Trek, and on seeing Nichols' character Uhura, exclaimed: "Momma! There's a black lady on television and she ain't no maid!" This spawned Goldberg's lifelong Star Trek fandom.

== Other ventures ==
=== The View ===
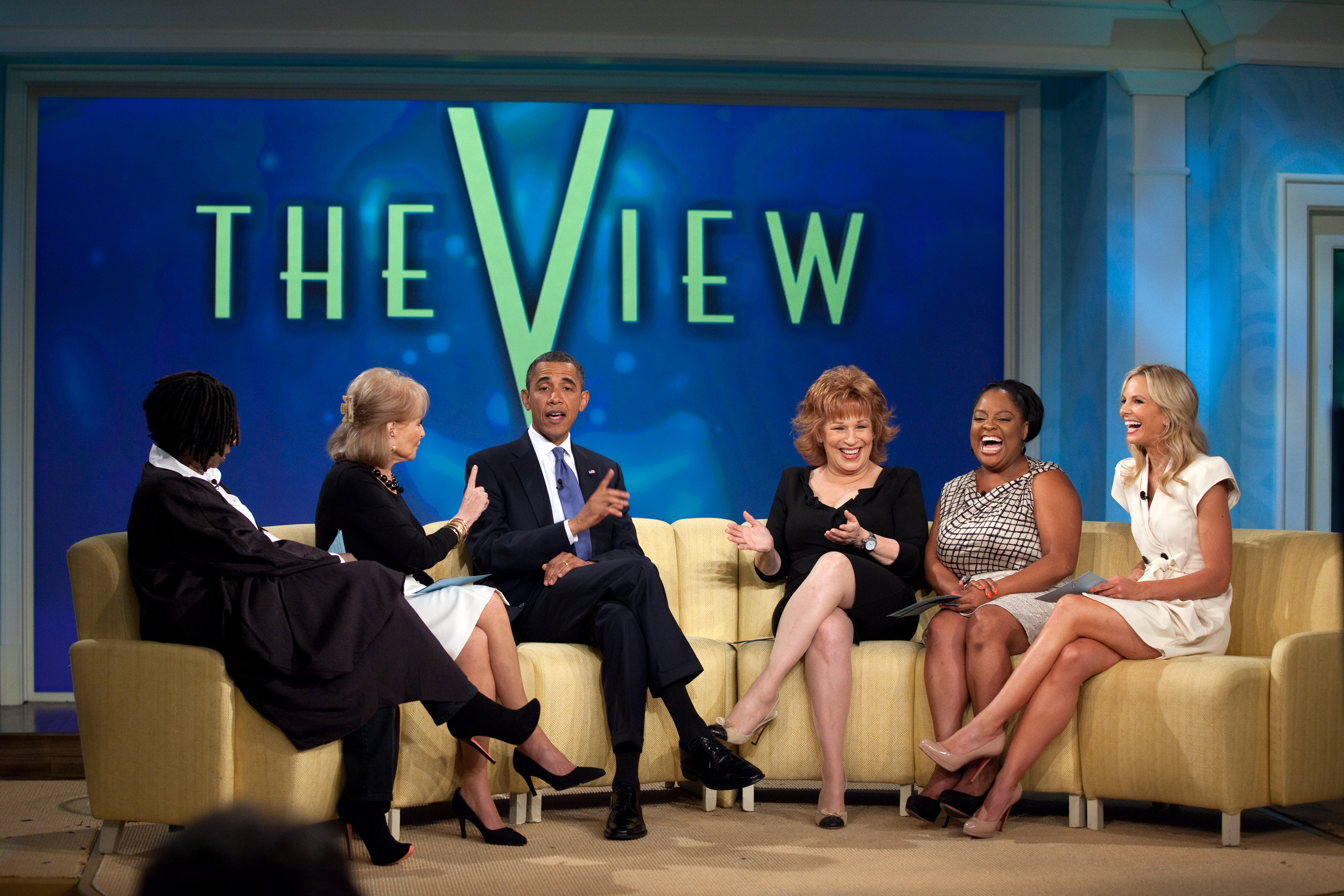
The View's panel interview Barack Obama in 2010; Goldberg is farthest to the left.

On September 4, 2007, Goldberg became the new moderator and co-host of The View, replacing Rosie O'Donnell. Goldberg's debut as moderator drew 3.4 million viewers, 1 million fewer than O'Donnell's debut ratings. However, after 2 weeks, The View was averaging 3.5 million total viewers under Goldberg, a 7-percent increase from 3.3 million under O'Donnell the previous season.

Goldberg has made controversial comments on the program on several occasions. One of her first appearances involved defending Michael Vick's participation in dogfighting as a result of "cultural upbringing". In 2009, she opined that Roman Polanski's rape conviction of a thirteen-year-old in 1977 was not "rape-rape". She later clarified that she had intended to distinguish between statutory rape and forcible rape. The following year, in response to alleged comments by Mel Gibson considered racist, she said: "I don't like what he did here, but I know Mel and I know he's not a racist".

In 2015, Goldberg was initially a defender of Bill Cosby from the rape allegations made against him, questioning why Cosby had never been arrested or tried for them. She later changed her stance, stating that "all of the information that's out there kinda points to 'guilt'." After learning that the statute of limitations on these allegations had expired and thus Cosby could not be tried, she also stated her support for removing the statute of limitations for rape.

On January 31, 2022, Goldberg drew widespread criticism for stating on the show that the Holocaust was not based on race but "about man's inhumanity to man", telling her co-hosts: "This is white people doing it to white people, so y'all going to fight amongst yourselves." She apologized on Twitter later that day. She maintained that the Nazis' issue was with ethnicity and not race on The Late Show with Stephen Colbert that same day, which drew further criticism. Goldberg issued another apology on air the following day. She was subsequently suspended from The View for two weeks over the comments.

=== Activism ===
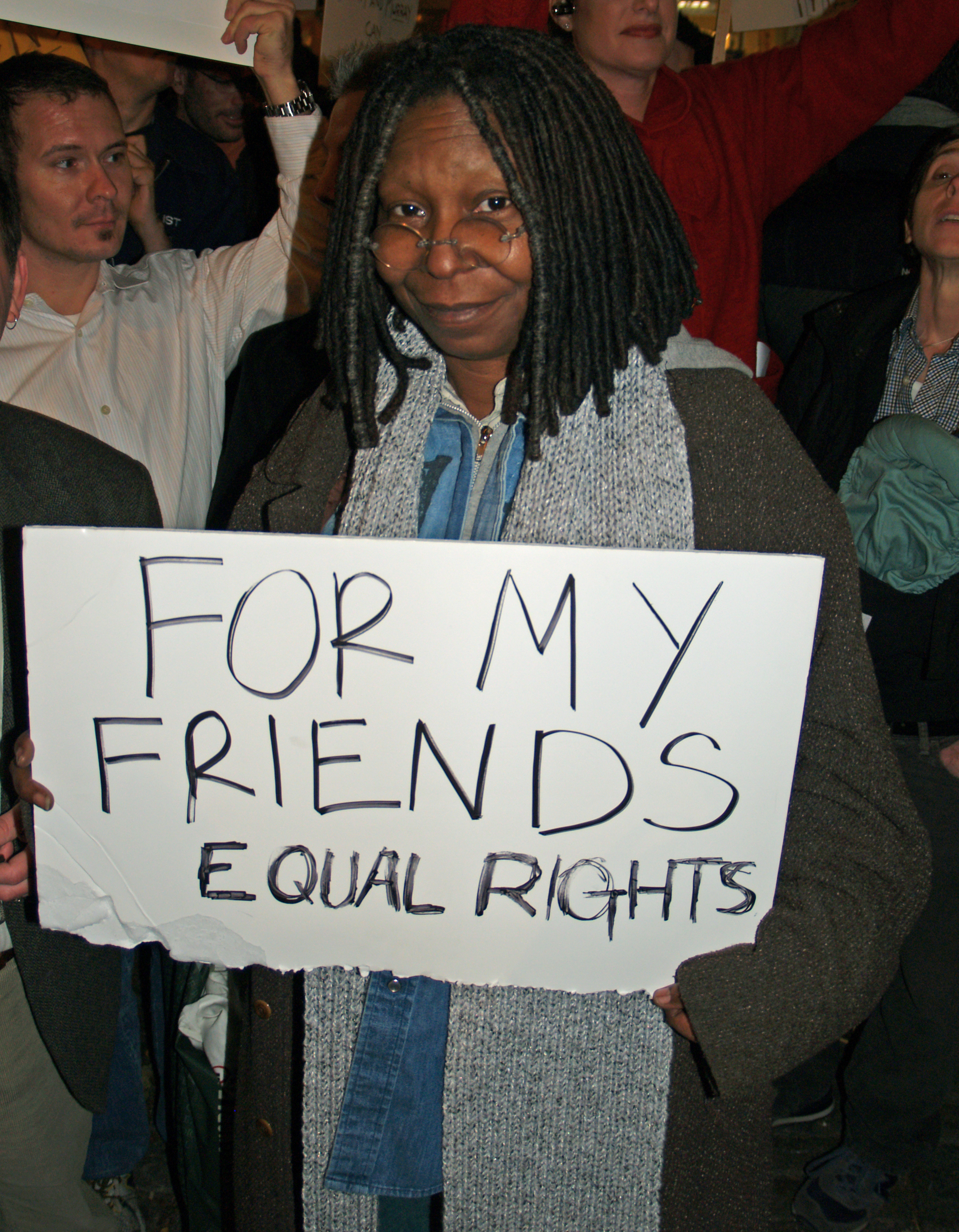
In New York City protesting the 2008 California Proposition 8

In 2006, Goldberg appeared during the 20th anniversary of Comic Relief. Goldberg is an advocate for human rights, moderating a panel at the Alliance of Youth Movements Summit on how social networks can be used to fight violent extremism in 2008, and also moderating a panel at the UN on human rights, children and armed conflict, terrorism, and reconciliation in 2009. She gave a short message at the beginning of the Junior Eurovision Song Contest 2008 wishing all the participants good luck, and stressing the importance of UNICEF, the official charity of the Junior Eurovision Song Contest. Since its launch in 2008, Goldberg has been a contributor for wowOwow.com, a website for women to talk culture, politics, and gossip.

On April 1, 2010, Goldberg joined Cyndi Lauper in the launch of her Give a Damn campaign to bring a wider awareness of the discrimination against the LGBT community and to invite straight people to ally with the gay, lesbian, bisexual, transgender community. Her high-profile support for LGBTQ rights and AIDS activism dates from the 1987 March on Washington, in which she participated. In May 2017, she spoke in support of transgender rights at the 28th GLAAD Media Awards.

Goldberg is on the Board of Selectors of Jefferson Awards for Public Service. She also serves on the National Council Advisory Board of the National Museum of American Illustration. On an episode of The View that aired on May 9, 2012, Goldberg stated she is a member of the National Rifle Association of America. She was a speaker at the 2017 Women's March in New York City and was such again at the following year's event.

On January 24, 2021, Goldberg appeared with Tom Everett Scott as guests on the AmAIRican Grabbuddies marathon fundraising episode of The George Lucas Talk Show, where she spoke of her time working on Snow Buddies and raised money for the ASPCA.

=== Entrepreneurship ===
Goldberg co-founded Whoopi & Maya, a company that made medical cannabis products for women seeking relief from menstrual cramps. Goldberg says she was inspired to go into business by "a lifetime of difficult periods and the fact that cannabis was literally the only thing that gave me relief". The company was launched in April 2016 but announced in February 2020 that it was ceasing operations. In 2021, Goldberg announced the launch of a new line of cannabis products, "Emma & Clyde", named for her late mother and brother.

On June 13, 2025, Goldberg appeared on CBS Mornings to announce that she had co-founded an all-women's sports network, AWSN, that is now streaming on Pluto TV.

== Personal life and public image ==
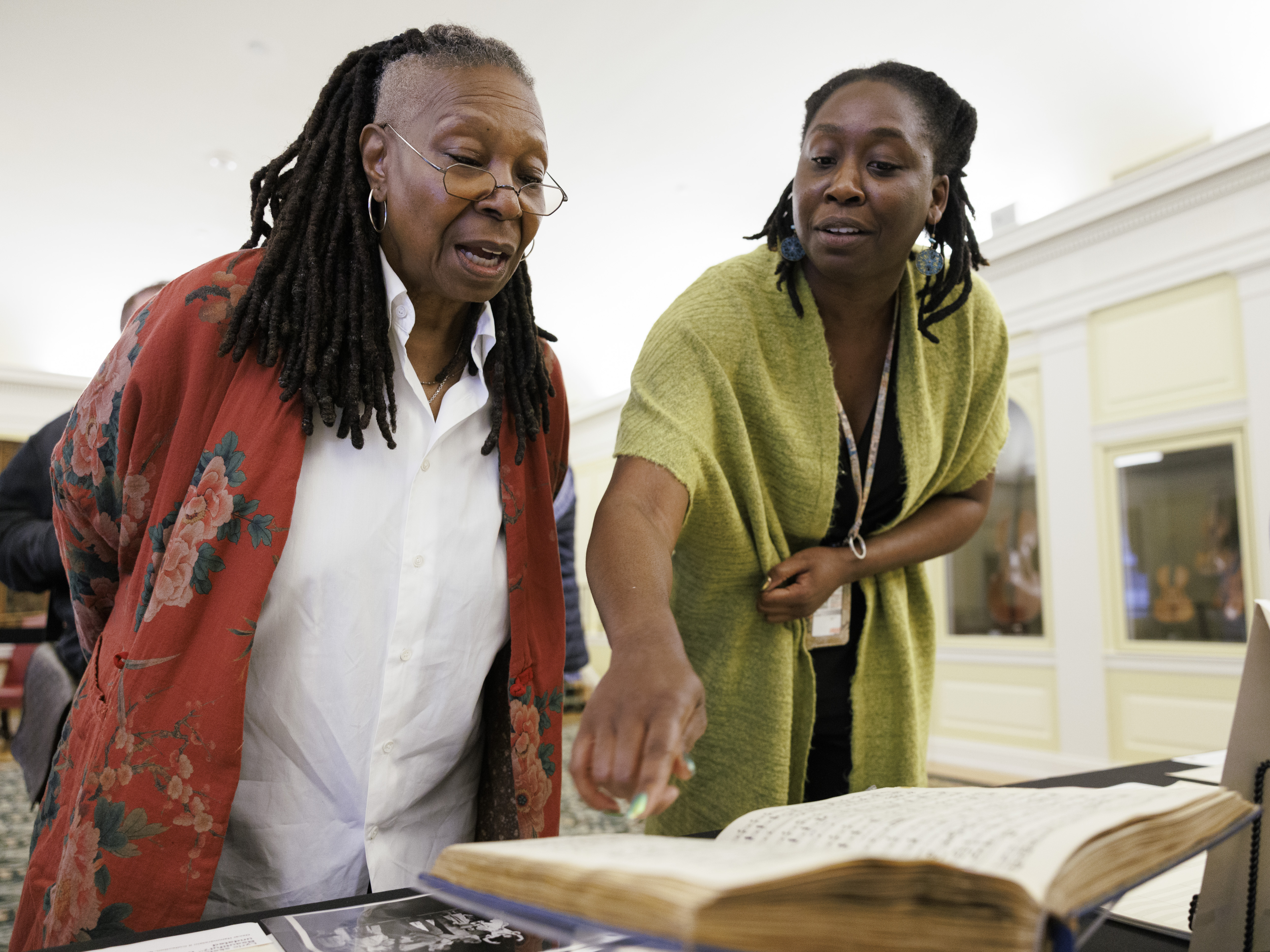
Goldberg at the Library of Congress in 2024

Goldberg has been married three times. She was married to drug counselor Alvin Martin from 1973 to 1979; to cinematographer David Claessen from 1986 to 1988; and to union organizer Lyle Trachtenberg from 1994 to 1995. She has had live-in relationships with actor Frank Langella and playwright David Schein. Her other ex-boyfriends include businessman Michael Visbal, orthodontist Jeffrey Cohen, camera operator Edward Gold, and actors Timothy Dalton and Ted Danson. Danson controversially appeared in blackface during his 1993 Friars Club roast; Goldberg wrote some of his jokes for the event and defended him after Danson received media blowback. Goldberg and Danson have both stated they received frequent hate mail about their relationship, and that had been a factor in their decision to do a comic routine that would bring racial stereotypes into the open.

She has stated that she has no plans to marry again: "Some people are not meant to be married and I am not meant to. I'm sure it is wonderful for lots of people." In a 2011 interview with Piers Morgan, she explained that she was never in love with the men she married and commented: "You have to really be committed to them...I don't have that commitment. I'm committed to my family."

On May 9, 1974, Goldberg gave birth to a daughter, Alexandrea Martin, who also became an actress and producer. Through her daughter, Goldberg has three grandchildren and a great-granddaughter. On August 29, 2010, Goldberg's mother, Emma Johnson, died after having a stroke. She left London at the time, where she had been performing in the musical Sister Act, but returned to perform on October 22, 2010. In 2015, Goldberg's brother Clyde died of a brain aneurysm. In 1991, Goldberg spoke out about her abortion in The Choices We Made: Twenty-Five Women and Men Speak Out About Abortion. In that book, she spoke about using a coat hanger to terminate a pregnancy at the age of 14. She said she had six or seven abortions by the age of 25 and that birth control pills failed to stop several of her pregnancies.

Goldberg has stated that she was once a "functioning" drug addict. She has stated that she smoked marijuana before accepting the Best Supporting Actress award for Ghost in 1991.

Goldberg has dyslexia.

She has lived in Llewellyn Park, a neighborhood in West Orange, New Jersey, saying she moved there to be able to be outside in private. She maintains an additional summer residence on the coast of Sardinia. She has expressed a preference for defining herself by the gender-neutral term "actor" rather than "actress", saying: "An actress can only play a woman. I'm an actor—I can play anything." In March 2019, Goldberg revealed that she had been battling pneumonia and sepsis, which caused her to take a leave of absence from The View.

On a season 9 episode of Finding Your Roots, featuring Pro Football Hall of Fame tight end Tony Gonzalez, it was revealed that Goldberg and Gonzalez are distant cousins.

== Acting credits and awards ==
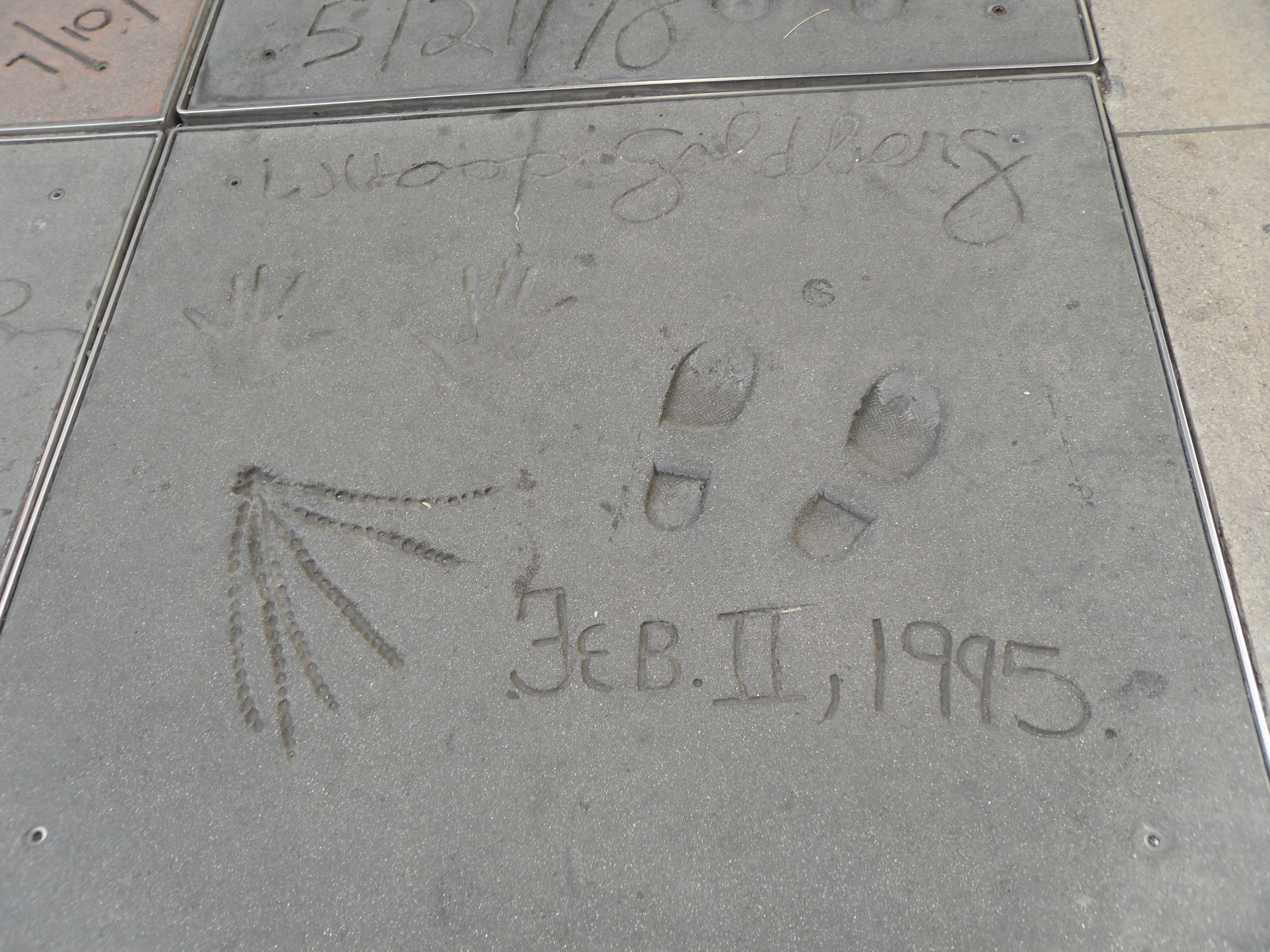
Whoopi Goldberg signature at Grauman's Chinese Theater

Having acted in more than 150 films, Goldberg is one of the 19 people to achieve the EGOT, having won the four major American awards for professional entertainers: an Emmy (Television), a Grammy (Music), an Oscar (Film), and a Tony (Theater). She is the first black woman to have achieved all four awards.

Goldberg has received two Academy Award nominations, for The Color Purple and Ghost (winning for Ghost). She is the first African-American actor to have received Academy Award nominations for both Best Actress and Best Supporting Actress, and the second African-American woman to win an Oscar. She has received three Golden Globe Award nominations, winning two (Best Actress in 1986 for The Color Purple, and Best Supporting Actress in 1991 for Ghost). For Ghost, she also won a BAFTA Award for Best Actress in a Supporting Role in 1991.

She won a Grammy Award for Best Comedy Recording in 1985 for Whoopi Goldberg: Original Broadway Show Recording, becoming only the second solo woman performer—not part of a duo or team—to receive the award, and the first African-American woman. Goldberg is one of only three single women performers to receive that award. She won a Tony Award in 2002 as a producer of the Broadway musical Thoroughly Modern Millie. She has received eight Daytime Emmy Award nominations, winning two. She has received nine Primetime Emmy Award nominations. In 2009, Goldberg won the Daytime Emmy Award for Outstanding Talk Show Host for her work on The View. She shared the award with her then co-hosts Joy Behar, Sherri Shepherd, Elisabeth Hasselbeck, and Barbara Walters.

Goldberg is the recipient of the 1985 Drama Desk Award for Outstanding One-Person Show for her solo performance on Broadway. She has won three People's Choice Awards. She has been nominated for five American Comedy Awards, with two wins (Funniest Supporting Actress in 1991 for Ghost and Funniest Actress in 1993 for Sister Act). She was the three-time (and inaugural) winner of the Kids' Choice Award for Favorite Movie Actress. In 2001, she became the first African-American female to receive the Mark Twain Prize for American Humor.

In 1990, Goldberg was officially named an honorary member of the Harlem Globetrotters exhibition basketball team by the members. In 1999, she received the Gay and Lesbian Alliance Against Defamation Vanguard Award for her continued work in supporting the gay and lesbian community, as well as the Women in Film Crystal Award for outstanding women who, through their endurance and the excellence of their work, have helped to expand the role of women within the entertainment industry. In July 2010, the Ride of Fame honored Goldberg with a double-decker tour bus in New York City for her life's achievements. In 2017, Goldberg was named a Disney Legend for her contributions to the Walt Disney Company.

== Discography ==
- 1985: Original Broadway Recording (Geffen/Warner Bros. Records)
- 1985: The Color Purple (Qwest/Warner Bros. Records)
- 1988: Fontaine: Why Am I Straight? (MCA Records)
- 1989: The Long Walk Home (Miramax Films)
- 1992: Sarafina (Qwest/Warner Bros. Records)
- 1992: Sister Act – Soundtrack (Hollywood/Elektra Records)
- 1993: Sister Act 2: Back in the Habit – Soundtrack (Hollywood/Elektra Records)
- 1994: Corrina Corrina (New Line Cinema)
- 2001: Call Me Claus (One Ho Productions)
- 2005: Live on Broadway: The 20th Anniversary Show (DRG Records)

== Bibliography ==
Children's books

- Whoopi's Big Book of Manners. New York: Hyperion Books for Children. 2006. ISBN 0-7868-5295-X.
- Sugar Plum Ballerinas #1: Plum Fantastic. New York: Hyperion Books for Children. 2008. ISBN 978-1-4231-1173-3.
- Sugar Plum Ballerinas #2: Toeshoe Trouble. New York: Hyperion Books for Children. 2009. ISBN 978-1-4231-1913-5.
- Sugar Plum Ballerinas #3: Perfectly Prima. New York: Hyperion Books for Children. 2010. ISBN 978-1-4231-2054-4.
- Sugar Plum Ballerinas #4: Terrible Terrel. New York: Hyperion Books for Children. October 2010. ISBN 978-1-4231-2082-7.
- Sugar Plum Ballerinas #5: CATastrophe. New York: Hyperion Books for Children. March 2011. ISBN 978-1-4231-2083-4.
- Sugar Plum Ballerinas #6: Dancing Divas. Los Angeles: Little People Books. October 2012. ISBN 978-1-4231-2084-1.

Non-fiction

- Alice. New York: Bantam Books. 1992. ISBN 0-553-08990-0.
- Book. New York: Rob Weisbach Books. 1997. ISBN 0-688-15252-X. Autobiographical essays.
- Is It Just Me? Or Is It Nuts Out There?. New York: Hyperion. October 2010. ISBN 978-1-4013-2384-4.
- Whoopi's Big Book of Relationships: If Someone Says "You Complete Me," RUN!. New York: Hachette. October 2015. ISBN 978-0-316-30200-5.
- Bits and Pieces: My Mother, My Brother, and Me. Ashland, OR: Blackstone Publishing. May 7, 2024. ISBN 9798200920235. OCLC 1428736887. Autobiography.

== Other Information ==
In 1984, Goldberg made her visit to Great Britain, during which she performed in the Glasgow International Festival of Popular Theatre and Music "Mayfest".

== See also ==
- Broadcast journalism
- List of people who have won Academy, Emmy, Grammy, and Tony Awards
- List of Black Academy Award winners and nominees
- List of Black Golden Globe Award winners and nominees
- New Yorkers in journalism

Media offices
Preceded by Rosie O'Donnell	The View co-host 2007–present	Incumbent
