= Clara's Heart =

1988 film by Robert Mulligan

- Theatrical release poster
- Directed by: Robert Mulligan
- Screenplay by: Mark Medoff
- Based on: Clara's Heart by Joseph Olshan
- Produced by: Martin Elfand
- Starring: Whoopi Goldberg; Michael Ontkean; Kathleen Quinlan; Spalding Gray; Neil Patrick Harris
- Cinematography: Freddie Francis
- Edited by: Sidney Levin
- Music by: Dave Grusin
- Production company: MTM Enterprises
- Distributed by: Warner Bros. Pictures
- Release date: October 7, 1988
- Running time: 108 minutes
- Country: United States
- Language: English
- Box office: $5,194,491 (domestic)

Clara's Heart is a 1988 American drama film, based on Joseph Olshan's novel of the same name, directed by Robert Mulligan, written by Mark Medoff and is also Neil Patrick Harris' debut role.

== Plot ==
The Hart family, parents Leona and Bill and son David, suffer the loss of their infant daughter Edith. The parents travel to Jamaica, where they meet a hotel maid, Clara Mayfield, offering her work as the housekeeper. Clara accepts, and takes the position at the family's Baltimore lakefront estate.

Bill and Leona then go their separate ways. Bill dates an interior designer, and Leona moves to California to live with a famed self-help author, Dr. Peter Epstein. David, staying in Baltimore, is upset, perceiving them as focused on themselves instead of their own son.

A bond then forms between David and the housekeeper, towards whom he was initially unwelcoming. However, this is put at stake when he gets into her private letters written by her son Ralphie. Clara eventually explains to David that she disowned Ralphie for raping a woman, and then did the same to Clara, before taking his own life by jumping off a cliff. Clara then quits the job without saying goodbye to David, who reacts in rage.

David briefly visits his mom in California, before moving back to Baltimore to meet his father and Clara, who has a new job. He apologizes to Clara for his immature behavior, showing appreciation for helping him get through the divorce. Clara says he will always be in her heart.

== Cast ==
- Whoopi Goldberg as Clara Mayfield
- Neil Patrick Harris as David Hart
- Michael Ontkean as Bill Hart, David's father
- Kathleen Quinlan as Leona Hart, David's mother
- Spalding Gray as Peter Epstein
- Beverly Todd as Dora
- Hattie Winston as Blanche Loudon
- Jason Downs as Alan Lipsky

== Production ==
The film marked a return to the director's chair for industry veteran Robert Mulligan, who had not made a film in six years after the critical and commercial failure of Kiss Me Goodbye. Film editor Sid Levin describes Mulligan as being "a bit aloof" during their first meeting but coming across as "a caring, sensitive, decent man." Mulligan was tense during the shooting period, however, and grew angry when Levin expressed his concerns over the scenes involving actor Spalding Gray. Not until principal photography was finished was Mulligan willing to discuss alternative ideas with Levin in the editing room. They wound up finding common ground over one of the crucial scenes towards the end of the film, in which Clara confesses to David the truth about her son. When Mulligan realized that actress Whoopi Goldberg had improvised the sequence too negatively, Levin was able to edit the sequence in such a way to make it feel less dark.

Filming included several locations in Talbot County, Maryland. The opening scene, a funeral, was filmed at the historic Oxford Cemetery in Oxford, Maryland. The mansion home of Bill (Michael Ontkean) and Leona Hart (Kathleen Quinlan), and her young son, David (Neil Patrick Harris) is found on Old Country Club Road, adjacent to Maryland State Route 33 near Easton, Maryland. Other locations included Saint Michaels, Maryland, Baltimore, Maryland, New York and Port Antonio, Jamaica.

This was the third and final theatrical production made by MTM Enterprises.

== Reception ==
The film received mixed reviews from critics. On Rotten Tomatoes, Clara's Heart holds a rating of 47% from 17 reviews. On Metacritic the film has a weighted average score of 52 out of 100, based on 12 critics, indicating "mixed or average" reviews.

Roger Ebert, in a 1 1/2-star review for the Chicago Sun Times, praised Whoopi Goldberg's performance but panned the film itself, writing, "Goldberg is magnificent. The character belongs in a different film, even a different universe, from the rest of the ludicrous plot." Recent praise for the film has appeared in an online article by film professor Robert Keser, who writes, "Almost two decades after the release of Clara’s Heart, the film looks dated only in its virtues. As commercial cinema, it represents a classical control and modulation of storytelling, spinning its emotional threads patiently with no hammering close-ups and little pandering to the decoratively picturesque. Equally, the film seems sweetly unconscious of consumer culture that seeks to define us by acquisition and consumption: no brand names are touted, no recreational shopping montages display products to suggest meaning."
