= Songs from Call Me Claus =

Compilation album by Garth Brooks
- Released: September 25, 2001
- Studio: Jack's Tracks (Nashville, Tennessee)
- Genre: Christmas
- Label: Capitol Nashville
- Producer: Allen Reynolds

Garth Brooks chronology
Garth Brooks and the Magic of Christmas (1999)	Songs from Call Me Claus (2001)	Scarecrow (2001)

Professional ratings
Review scores
Source	Rating
AllMusic	2.5/5 stars

Songs from Call Me Claus is a reissue of Garth Brooks and the Magic of Christmas, the second Christmas album by American country music artist Garth Brooks, and was released on September 25, 2001. The songs exclusive to this release are "Call Me Claus," "Mary Had a Little Lamb," and "'Zat You, Santa Claus?"

"Call Me Claus", "'Zat You, Santa Claus?", "Have Yourself a Merry Christmas" and "Winter Wonderland" were featured on the soundtrack of the 2001 television film Call Me Claus, on which Brooks was an executive producer.

== Track listing ==
1. "Call Me Claus" (Garth Brooks, Lisa Sanderson, Jenny Yates) – 2:08
2. "It's the Most Wonderful Time of the Year" (Edward Pola, George Wyle) – 2:57
3. "Have Yourself a Merry Little Christmas" (Ralph Blane, Hugh Martin) – 4:05
4. "Let It Snow! Let It Snow! Let It Snow!" (Sammy Cahn, Jule Styne) – 2:07
5. "Winter Wonderland" (Felix Bernard, Dick Smith) – 3:34
6. "Mary Had a Little Lamb" (Larry Bastian, Gordon Kennedy, Wayne Kirkpatrick) – 3:00
7. "The Christmas Song" (Mel Tormé, Robert Wells) – 3:25
8. "Baby Jesus Is Born" (Randy Handley, Cam King) – 3:59
9. "Sleigh Ride" (Leroy Anderson, Mitchell Parish) – 3:27
10. "Silver Bells" (Ray Evans, Jay Livingston) – 3:35
11. "(There's No Place Like) Home For The Holidays" (Robert Allen, Al Stillman) – 2:19
12. "'Zat You, Santa Claus?" (Jack Fox) – 2:33
13. "The Wise Man's Journey" [instrumental] (Bobby Wood) – 1:28
14. "O Little Town of Bethlehem" (Phillips Brooks, Lewis H. Redner) – 3:00

== Personnel ==
- Garth Brooks – lead vocals
- Mark Casstevens – acoustic guitar
- Chris Leuzinger – electric guitar
- The Nashville String Machine – strings
- Jeff Bailey – horns
- Ernie Collins – horns
- Mark Douthit – horns
- Chris Dunn – horns
- Robert Green – horns
- Michael Haynes – horns
- Don Jackson – horns
- Sam Levine – horns
- Chris McDonald – horns
- Douglas Moffet – horns
- Steve Patrick – horns
- Denis Solee – horns
- George Tidwell – horns
- Blair Masters – Hammond B-3 organ
- Bobby Wood – keyboards
- Mike Chapman – bass guitar
- Milton Sledge – drums
- Sam Bacco – percussion

== Charts ==
=== Weekly charts ===
Chart (2001)	Peak position
U.S. Billboard 200	99
U.S. Billboard Top Country Albums	8

=== Singles ===
Year	Single	US Country
2002	"Call Me Claus"	55
2002	"'Zat You, Santa Claus?"	55

== Certifications ==
Region	Certification	Certified units/sales
United States (RIAA)	Platinum	1,000,000^{‡}
^{‡} Sales+streaming figures based on certification alone.
