= Butterfly in the Sky =

Documentary about PBS's Reading Rainbow

- Directed by: Bradford Thomason; Brett Whitcomb
- Release date: 2022

Butterfly in the Sky is a 2022 documentary about the PBS television show Reading Rainbow, directed by Bradford Thomason and Brett Whitcomb. The documentary highlights LeVar Burton, the host of Reading Rainbow from 1983 until 2006, and provides an in-depth examination of the obstacles he and the show's creators encountered while striving to foster a passion for reading through television.

On the review aggregator website Rotten Tomatoes, 100% of 18 critics' reviews are positive. Metacritic, which uses a weighted average, assigned the film a score of 69 out of 100, based on 4 critics, indicating "generally favorable" reviews.
