= List of Top Country Albums number ones of 1996 =

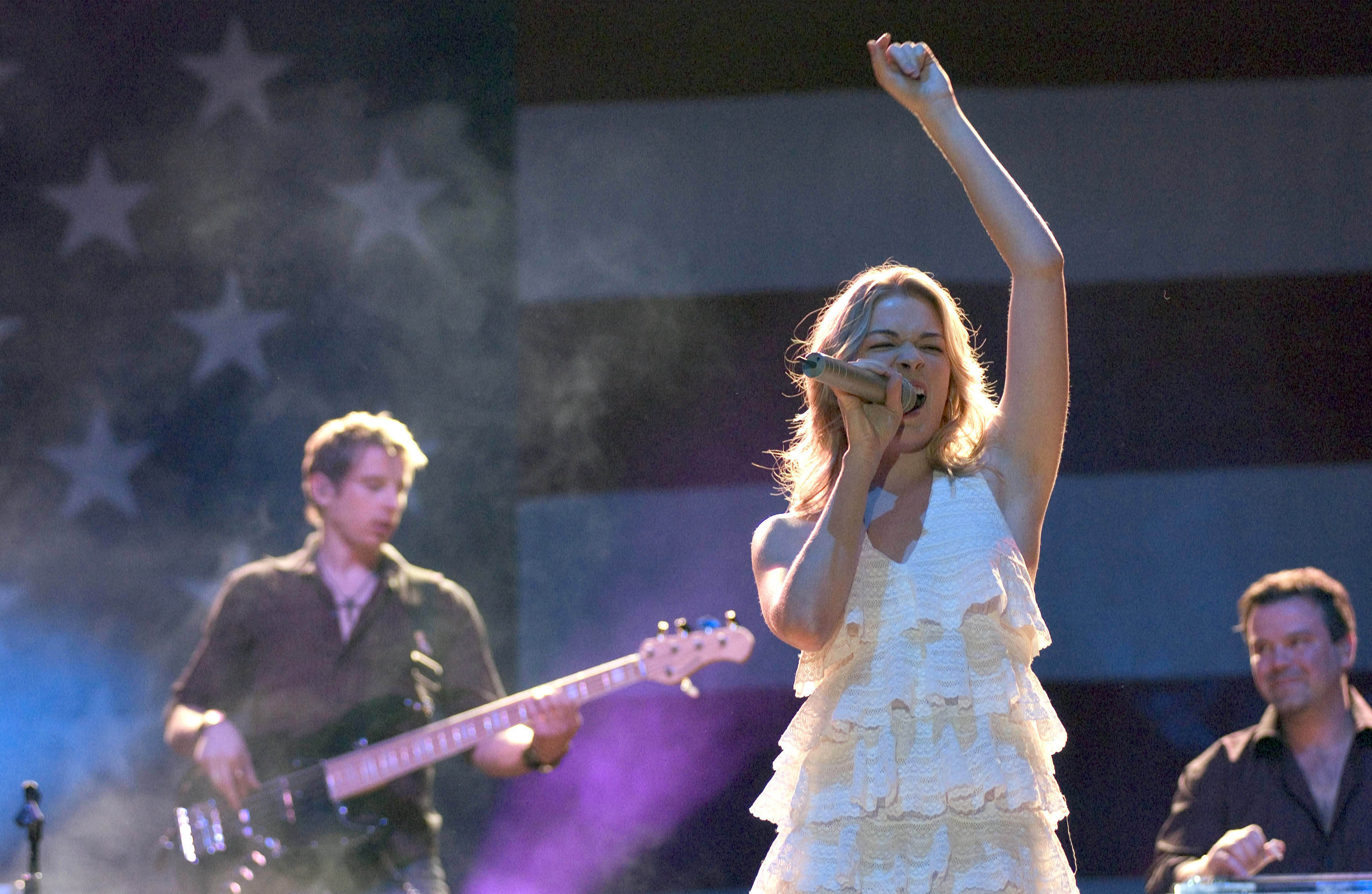
LeAnn Rimes was 13 years old when she topped the chart with her album Blue.

Top Country Albums is a chart that ranks the top-performing country music albums in the United States, published by Billboard. In 1996, seven different albums topped the chart, based on electronic point of sale data provided by SoundScan Inc.

In the issue of Billboard dated January 6, Garth Brooks was at number one with Fresh Horses, the album's fifth week atop the chart. It remained in the top spot for two further weeks before being displaced by Shania Twain's The Woman in Me, which went on to spend 14 consecutive weeks in the top spot. Twain's album would later return to number one for a further four weeks in June and July. Having already topped the chart for 11 weeks in 1995, the album's final total of 29 weeks in the top spot made it the longest-running number one country album to date by a female artist. The album's time at number one in 1996 was interrupted by two albums: Borderline by Brooks & Dunn and Blue Clear Sky by George Strait. The latter album won the award for Album of the Year from the Country Music Association.

In July, The Woman in Me's final spell at number one was ended by LeAnn Rimes with her album Blue. Rimes, who was 13 years old at the time, was heavily promoted as the heir to the legacy of Patsy Cline, one of the most iconic female country singers. Blue, her debut album, was an immediate success, entering the country chart at number one and the all-genre Billboard 200 listing at number three with one of the highest first-week sales figures in the era of SoundScan sales recording. The album remained at number one for 16 consecutive weeks, and returned to the top of the chart in December when it occupied the peak position for the final three weeks of the year. In addition to Twain's 18 weeks at number one and the 19 weeks spent in the top spot by Rimes, Reba McEntire spent a single week atop the chart with What If It's You. The total of 38 weeks was the greatest amount of time spent at number one in a calendar year by female artists in the chart's 33-year history.

== Chart history ==
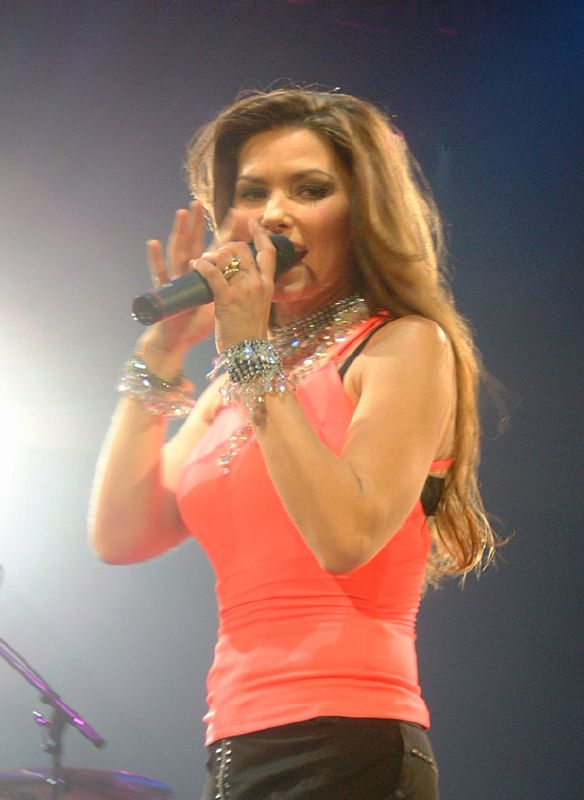
Shania Twain spent 18 weeks at number one with The Woman in Me.

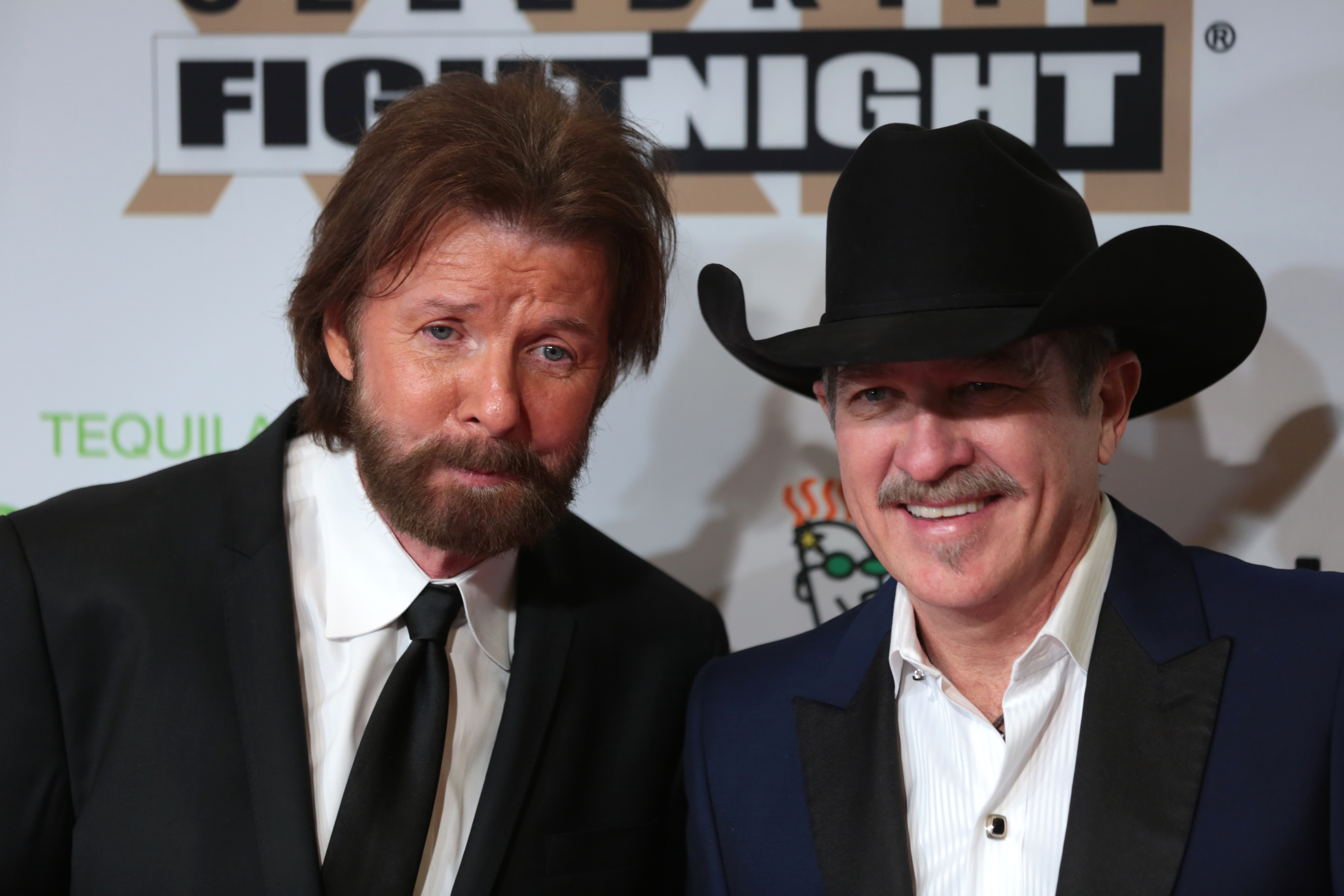
Borderline was a number one for Brooks & Dunn.

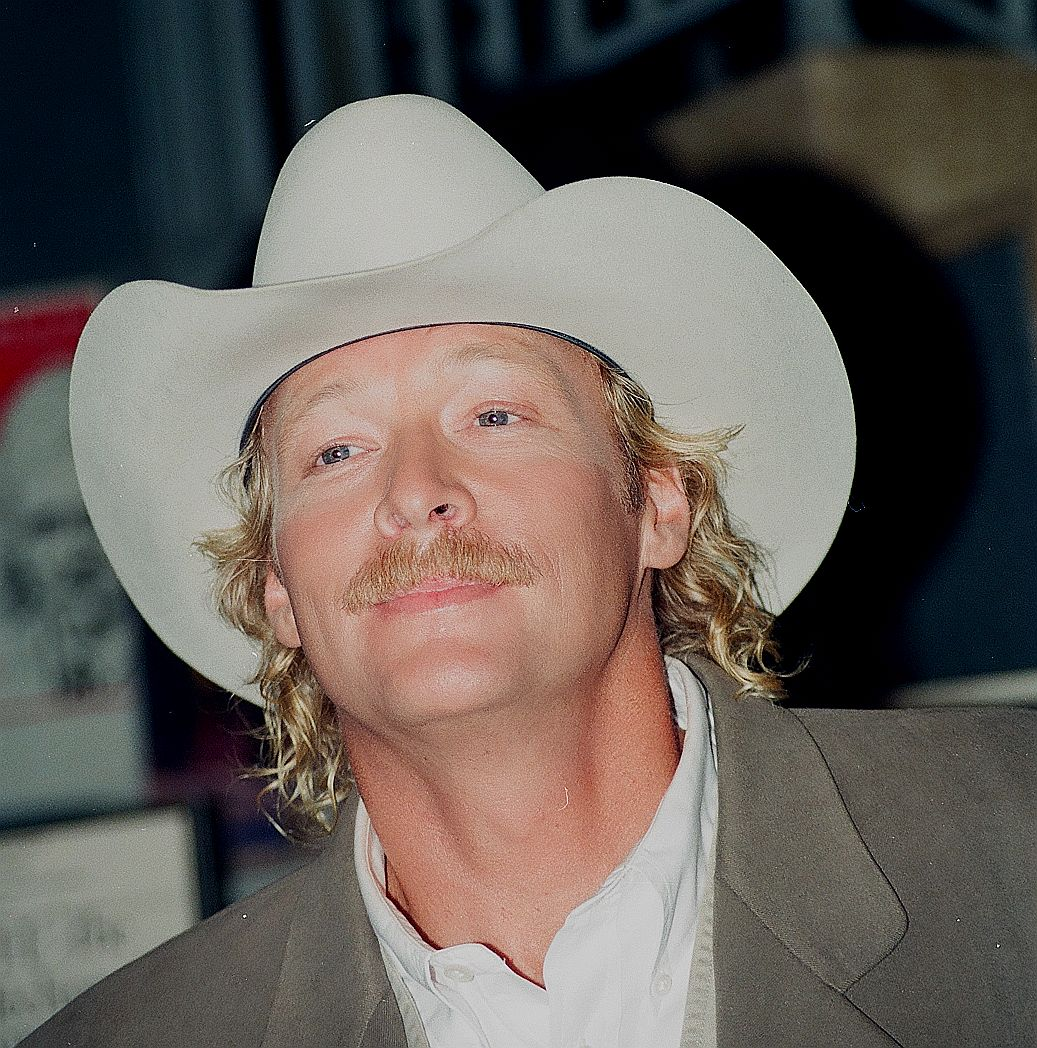
Alan Jackson topped the chart with Everything I Love.

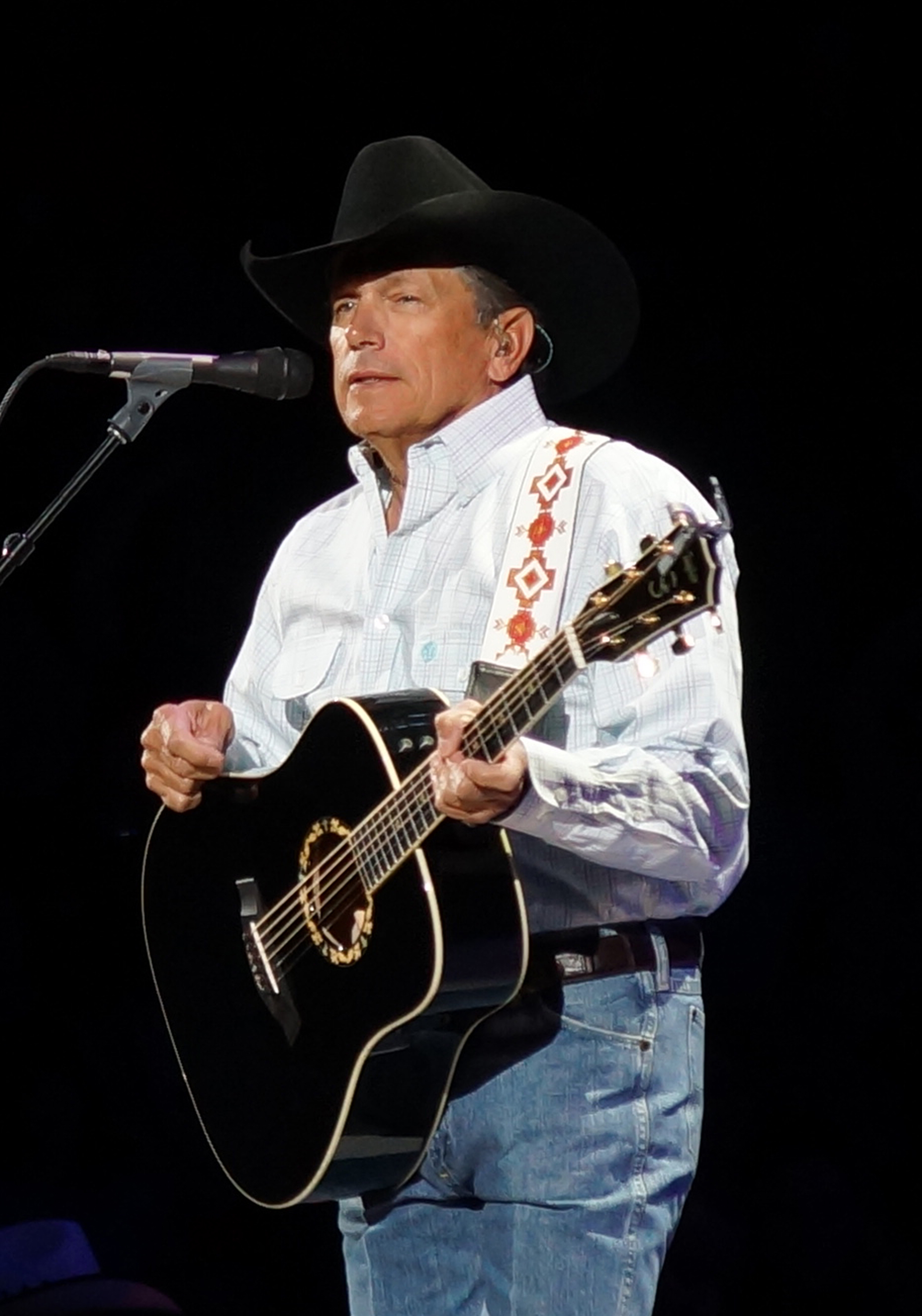
George Strait's Blue Clear Sky topped the chart and was also named Album of the Year by the Country Music Association.

| Issue date | Title | Artist(s) | Ref. |
|---|---|---|---|
| January 6 | Fresh Horses | Garth Brooks | |
| January 13 | Fresh Horses | Garth Brooks | |
| January 20 | Fresh Horses | Garth Brooks | |
| January 27 | The Woman in Me | Shania Twain | |
| February 3 | The Woman in Me | Shania Twain | |
| February 10 | The Woman in Me | Shania Twain | |
| February 17 | The Woman in Me | Shania Twain | |
| February 24 | The Woman in Me | Shania Twain | |
| March 2 | The Woman in Me | Shania Twain | |
| March 9 | The Woman in Me | Shania Twain | |
| March 16 | The Woman in Me | Shania Twain | |
| March 23 | The Woman in Me | Shania Twain | |
| March 30 | The Woman in Me | Shania Twain | |
| April 6 | The Woman in Me | Shania Twain | |
| April 13 | The Woman in Me | Shania Twain | |
| April 20 | The Woman in Me | Shania Twain | |
| April 27 | The Woman in Me | Shania Twain | |
| May 4 | Borderline | Brooks & Dunn | |
| May 11 | Blue Clear Sky | George Strait | |
| May 18 | Borderline | Brooks & Dunn | |
| May 25 | Borderline | Brooks & Dunn | |
| June 1 | Borderline | Brooks & Dunn | |
| June 8 | Borderline | Brooks & Dunn | |
| June 15 | Borderline | Brooks & Dunn | |
| June 22 | Borderline | Brooks & Dunn | |
| June 29 | The Woman in Me | Shania Twain | |
| July 6 | The Woman in Me | Shania Twain | |
| July 13 | The Woman in Me | Shania Twain | |
| July 20 | The Woman in Me | Shania Twain | |
| July 27 | Blue | LeAnn Rimes | |
| August 3 | Blue | LeAnn Rimes | |
| August 10 | Blue | LeAnn Rimes | |
| August 17 | Blue | LeAnn Rimes | |
| August 24 | Blue | LeAnn Rimes | |
| August 31 | Blue | LeAnn Rimes | |
| September 7 | Blue | LeAnn Rimes | |
| September 14 | Blue | LeAnn Rimes | |
| September 21 | Blue | LeAnn Rimes | |
| September 28 | Blue | LeAnn Rimes | |
| October 5 | Blue | LeAnn Rimes | |
| October 12 | Blue | LeAnn Rimes | |
| October 19 | Blue | LeAnn Rimes | |
| October 26 | Blue | LeAnn Rimes | |
| November 2 | Blue | LeAnn Rimes | |
| November 9 | Blue | LeAnn Rimes | |
| November 16 | Everything I Love | Alan Jackson | |
| November 23 | Everything I Love | Alan Jackson | |
| November 30 | What If It's You | Reba McEntire | |
| December 7 | Everything I Love | Alan Jackson | |
| December 14 | Blue | LeAnn Rimes | |
| December 21 | Blue | LeAnn Rimes | |
| December 28 | Blue | LeAnn Rimes | |
