= List of Top Country LP's number ones of 1969 =

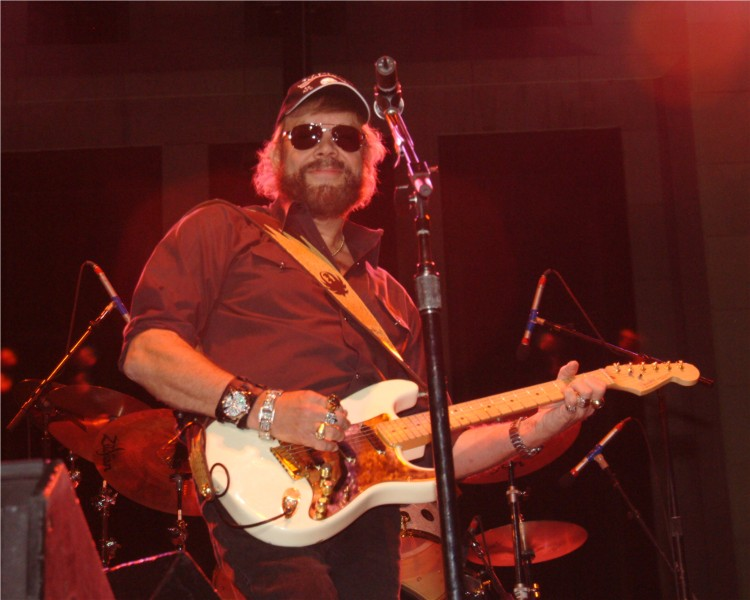
Hank Williams Jr (pictured in 2006) had his first chart-topping album with Songs My Father Left Me, an album of songs written by his father, Hank Williams.

Top Country Albums is a chart that ranks the top-performing country music albums in the United States, published by Billboard. In 1969, six different albums topped the chart, which was at the time published under the title Top Country LP's, based on sales reports submitted by a representative sample of stores nationwide.

In the issue of Billboard dated January 4, Glen Campbell was at number one with the album Wichita Lineman, the record's sixth week in the top spot. The album remained at number one through the issue of Billboard dated April 12 and its run of 20 consecutive weeks atop the chart was the longest achieved since the listing was first published in 1964. When the album was finally displaced from the top of the chart, it was by another of Campbell's albums, Galveston, which remained at number one for 12 consecutive weeks, meaning that Campbell had held the top spot without interruption for 32 weeks. Having reached the top of the chart with five other records in 1968, Campbell had achieved seven number-one albums within an 18-month period, but although his smooth country-pop style remained popular into the 1970s, he would not top the albums chart again until 1975. Campbell's occupation of the top spot came to an end in the issue of Billboard dated July 5 when Hank Williams Jr reached number one for the first time with Songs My Father Left Me, an album featuring recordings of songs written by his father, Hank Williams, who had died in 1953. The younger Williams had been promoted since an early age as the heir to his father's legacy and had recorded many of his songs, but it was not a role which he felt fit him well. Following a succession of personal problems he finally developed his own musical identity in the mid-1970s and went on to become one of the biggest country stars of the 1980s.

In the issue of Billboard dated August 2, Johnny Cash reached number one with the live album Johnny Cash at San Quentin (sometimes referred to simply as At San Quentin, but listed by Billboard with the artist's name as part of the title) which tied the record set by Campbell earlier in the year by spending 20 consecutive weeks atop the chart. Recorded at San Quentin State Prison in California, it was the second chart-topping album by Cash to have been recorded live at a correctional facility, following the previous year's Johnny Cash at Folsom Prison. The album recorded at San Quentin also topped Billboard's all-genre Top LP's chart, a feat also achieved earlier in the year by Glen Campbell's Wichita Lineman, and is considered a high point of Cash's lengthy career. It was displaced from the number-one position on the country albums listing by the compilation The Best of Charley Pride by Charley Pride, which held the top spot for the final two weeks of 1969.

== Chart history ==
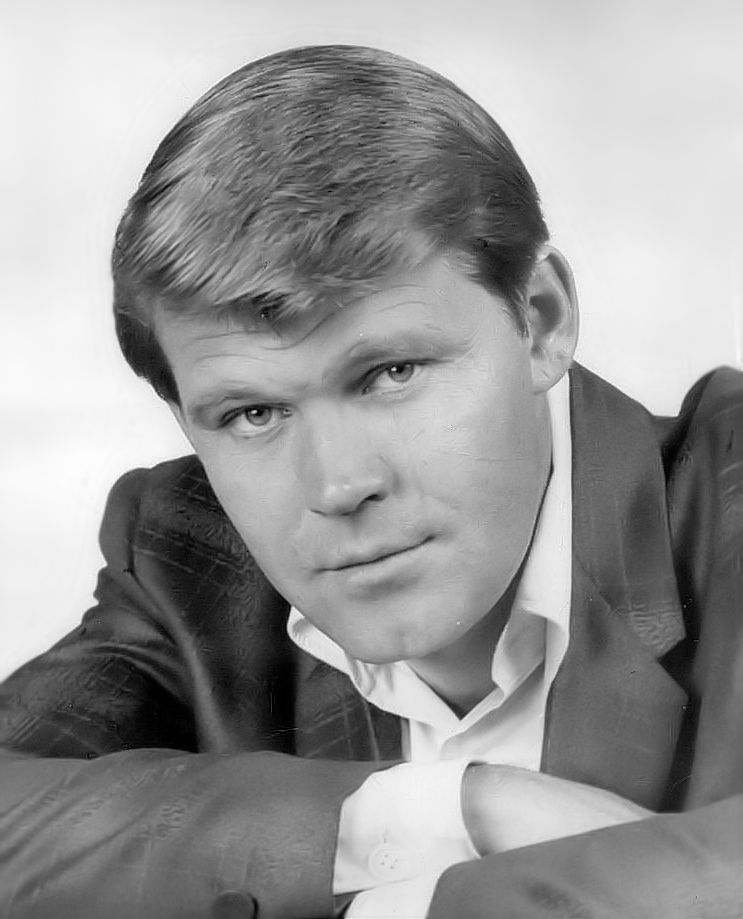
Glen Campbell occupied the top spot for the first six months of the year.

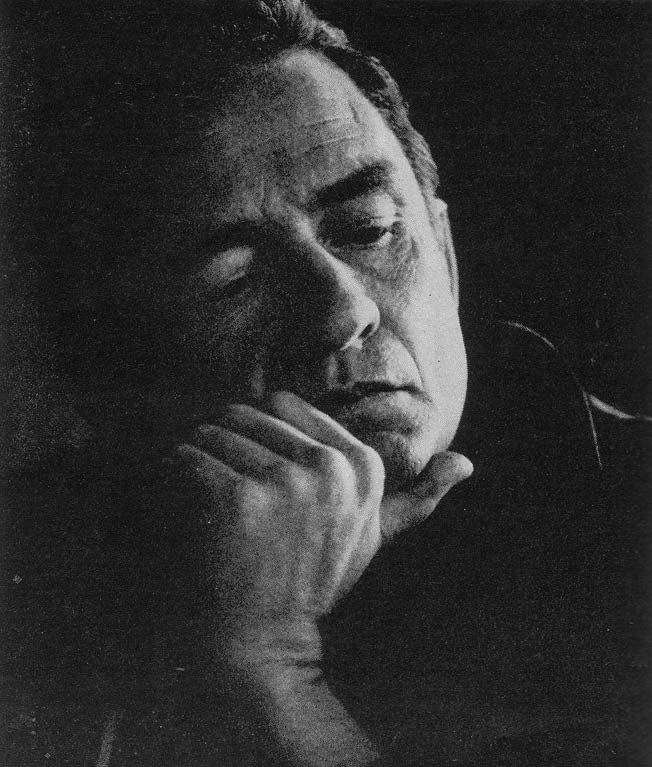
Johnny Cash reached the top spot with Johnny Cash at San Quentin, his second chart-topping album to be recorded live at a prison.

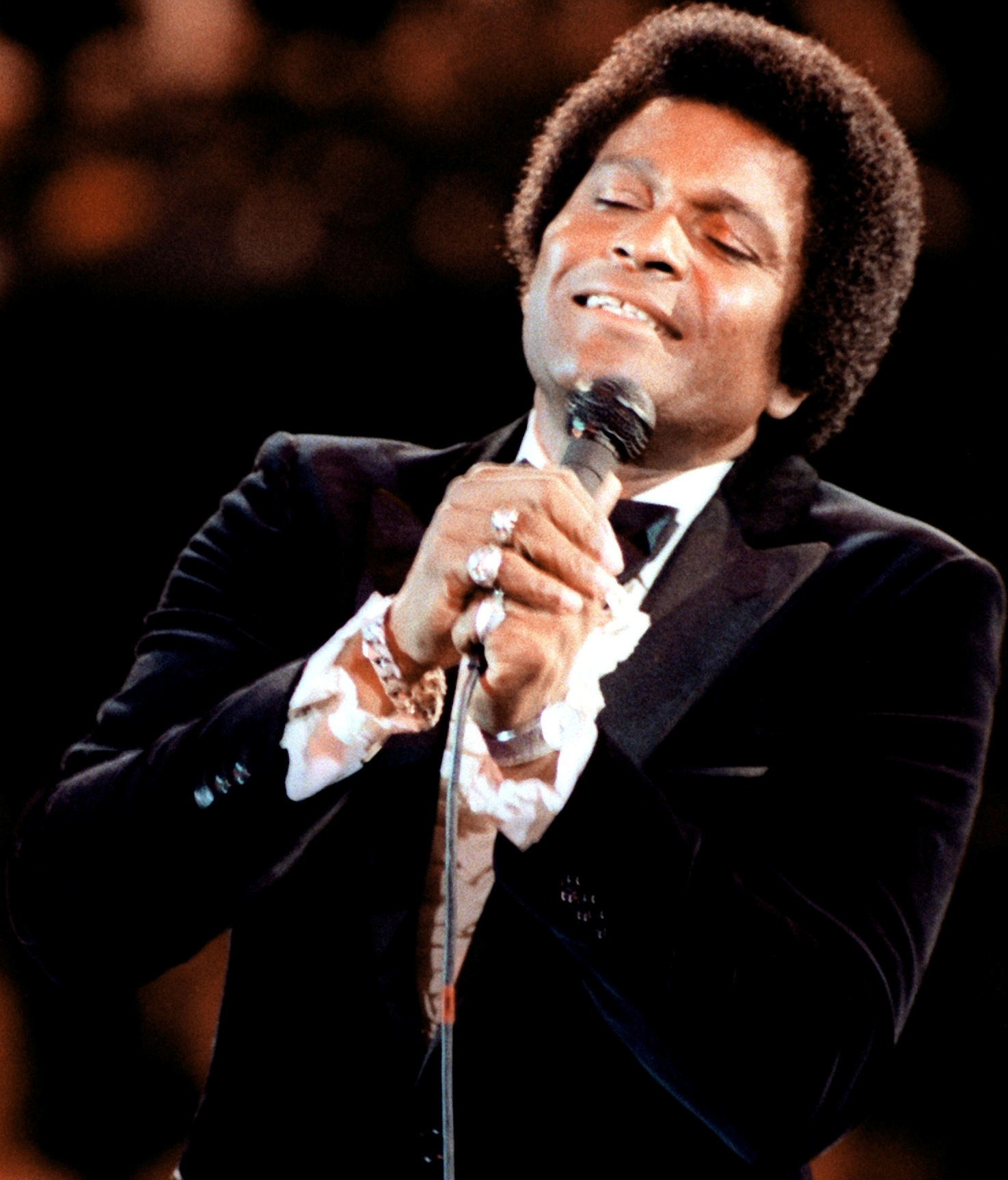
Charley Pride ended the year at number one.

Issue date	Title	Artist(s)	Ref.
January 4	Wichita Lineman	Glen Campbell	
January 11	Wichita Lineman	Glen Campbell	
January 18	Wichita Lineman	Glen Campbell	
January 25	Wichita Lineman	Glen Campbell	
February 1	Wichita Lineman	Glen Campbell	
February 8	Wichita Lineman	Glen Campbell	
February 15	Wichita Lineman	Glen Campbell	
February 22	Wichita Lineman	Glen Campbell	
March 1	Wichita Lineman	Glen Campbell	
March 8	Wichita Lineman	Glen Campbell	
March 15	Wichita Lineman	Glen Campbell	
March 22	Wichita Lineman	Glen Campbell	
March 29	Wichita Lineman	Glen Campbell	
April 5	Wichita Lineman	Glen Campbell	
April 12	Wichita Lineman	Glen Campbell	
April 19	Galveston	Glen Campbell	
April 26	Galveston	Glen Campbell	
May 3	Galveston	Glen Campbell	
May 10	Galveston	Glen Campbell	
May 17	Galveston	Glen Campbell	
May 24	Galveston	Glen Campbell	
May 31	Galveston	Glen Campbell	
June 7	Galveston	Glen Campbell	
June 14	Galveston	Glen Campbell	
June 21	Galveston	Glen Campbell	
June 28	Galveston	Glen Campbell	
July 5	Songs My Father Left Me	Hank Williams Jr.	
July 12	Songs My Father Left Me	Hank Williams Jr.	
July 19	Same Train, a Different Time	Merle Haggard and the Strangers	
July 26	Same Train, a Different Time	Merle Haggard and the Strangers	
August 2	Johnny Cash at San Quentin	Johnny Cash	
August 9	Johnny Cash at San Quentin	Johnny Cash	
August 16	Johnny Cash at San Quentin	Johnny Cash	
August 23	Johnny Cash at San Quentin	Johnny Cash	
August 30	Johnny Cash at San Quentin	Johnny Cash	
September 6	Johnny Cash at San Quentin	Johnny Cash	
September 13	Johnny Cash at San Quentin	Johnny Cash	
September 20	Johnny Cash at San Quentin	Johnny Cash	
September 27	Johnny Cash at San Quentin	Johnny Cash	
October 4	Johnny Cash at San Quentin	Johnny Cash	
October 11	Johnny Cash at San Quentin	Johnny Cash	
October 18	Johnny Cash at San Quentin	Johnny Cash	
October 25	Johnny Cash at San Quentin	Johnny Cash	
November 1	Johnny Cash at San Quentin	Johnny Cash	
November 8	Johnny Cash at San Quentin	Johnny Cash	
November 15	Johnny Cash at San Quentin	Johnny Cash	
November 22	Johnny Cash at San Quentin	Johnny Cash	
November 29	Johnny Cash at San Quentin	Johnny Cash	
December 6	Johnny Cash at San Quentin	Johnny Cash	
December 13	Johnny Cash at San Quentin	Johnny Cash	
December 20	The Best of Charley Pride	Charley Pride	
December 27	The Best of Charley Pride	Charley Pride	
