= List of Top Country Albums number ones of 1992 =

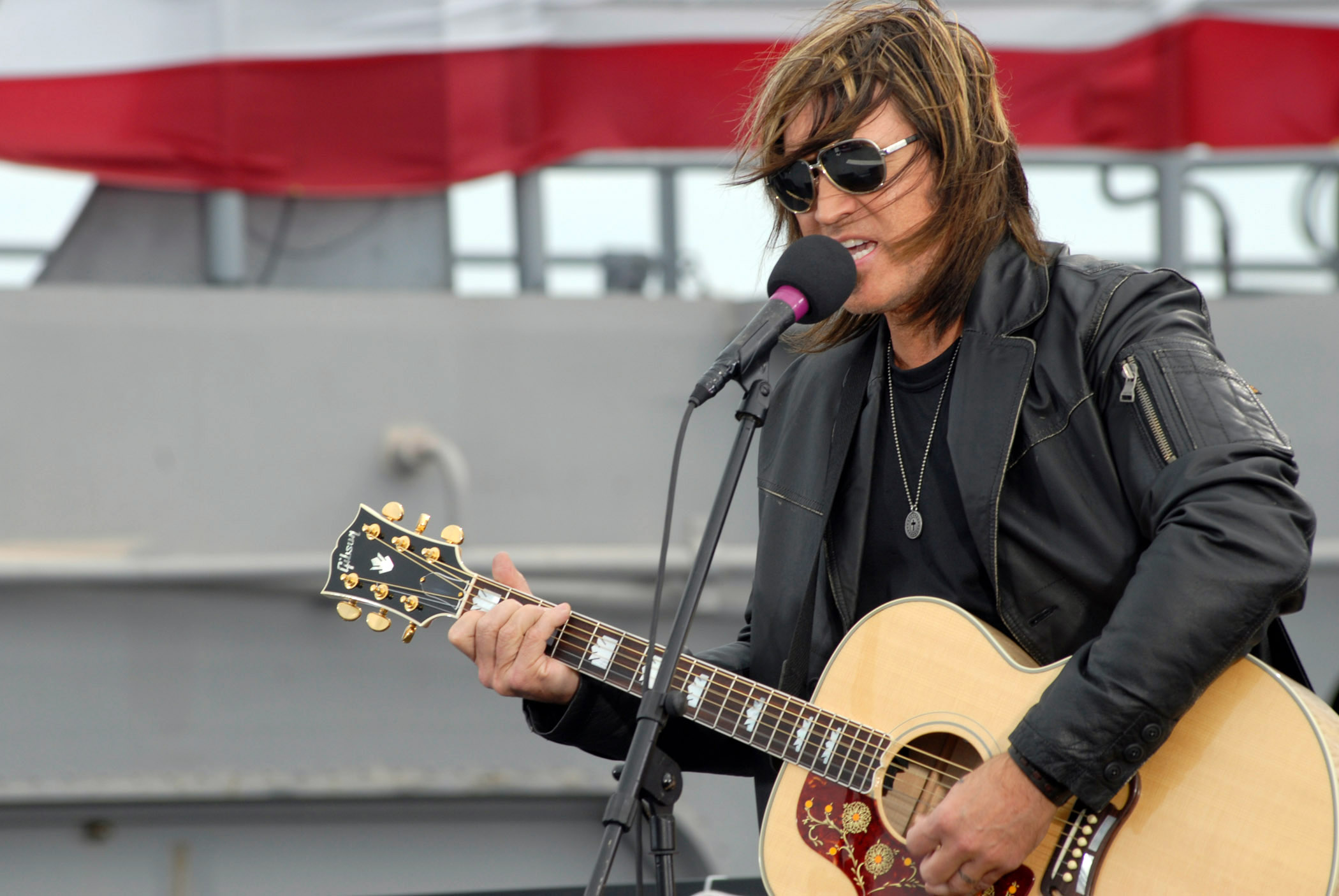
Billy Ray Cyrus had a lengthy run at number one with his debut album Some Gave All.

Top Country Albums is a chart that ranks the top-performing country music albums in the United States, published by Billboard. In 1992, four different albums topped the chart, based on electronic point of sale data provided by SoundScan Inc.

In the issue of Billboard dated January 4, Garth Brooks was at number one with the album Ropin' the Wind. Brooks had held the top spot with that album and his previous release No Fences since the previous February, with the exception of a single week. Brooks experienced a level of mainstream popularity and success in the early 1990s unprecedented for a country artist, making him one of the biggest-selling acts not only within the country market but across all genres. Ropin' the Wind also topped the all-genre Billboard 200 listing for 18 weeks and went on to be certified multi-platinum by the Recording Industry Association of America. Brooks returned to number one in November with The Chase, which again was a crossover success, entering both the country albums chart and the Billboard 200 at number one.

Two other acts topped the Top Country Albums chart in 1992. In the issue of Billboard dated April 18, Wynonna ended Brooks's eleven-month occupation of the top spot with her self-titled album. It was the first solo release by the singer, who had previously performed with her mother Naomi Judd as the Judds. Two months later, Billy Ray Cyrus reached the peak position with his debut album Some Gave All, which went on to spend 18 consecutive weeks at number one. The album was another major crossover success, topping the Billboard 200 for 17 weeks. It would return to the top of the country chart for a further 16 weeks in 1993, its final total of 34 weeks in the top spot being the third-highest figure in the chart's history to date. The album would go on to become the biggest-selling debut of all time by a solo artist in the country music genre. Some Gave All's initial run at number one was ended in the issue of Billboard dated October 10 when Garth Brooks entered the chart at number one with The Chase; in that week albums by Brooks occupied four of the top five positions on the chart. The Chase remained at number one for the final 12 weeks of 1992.

== Chart history ==
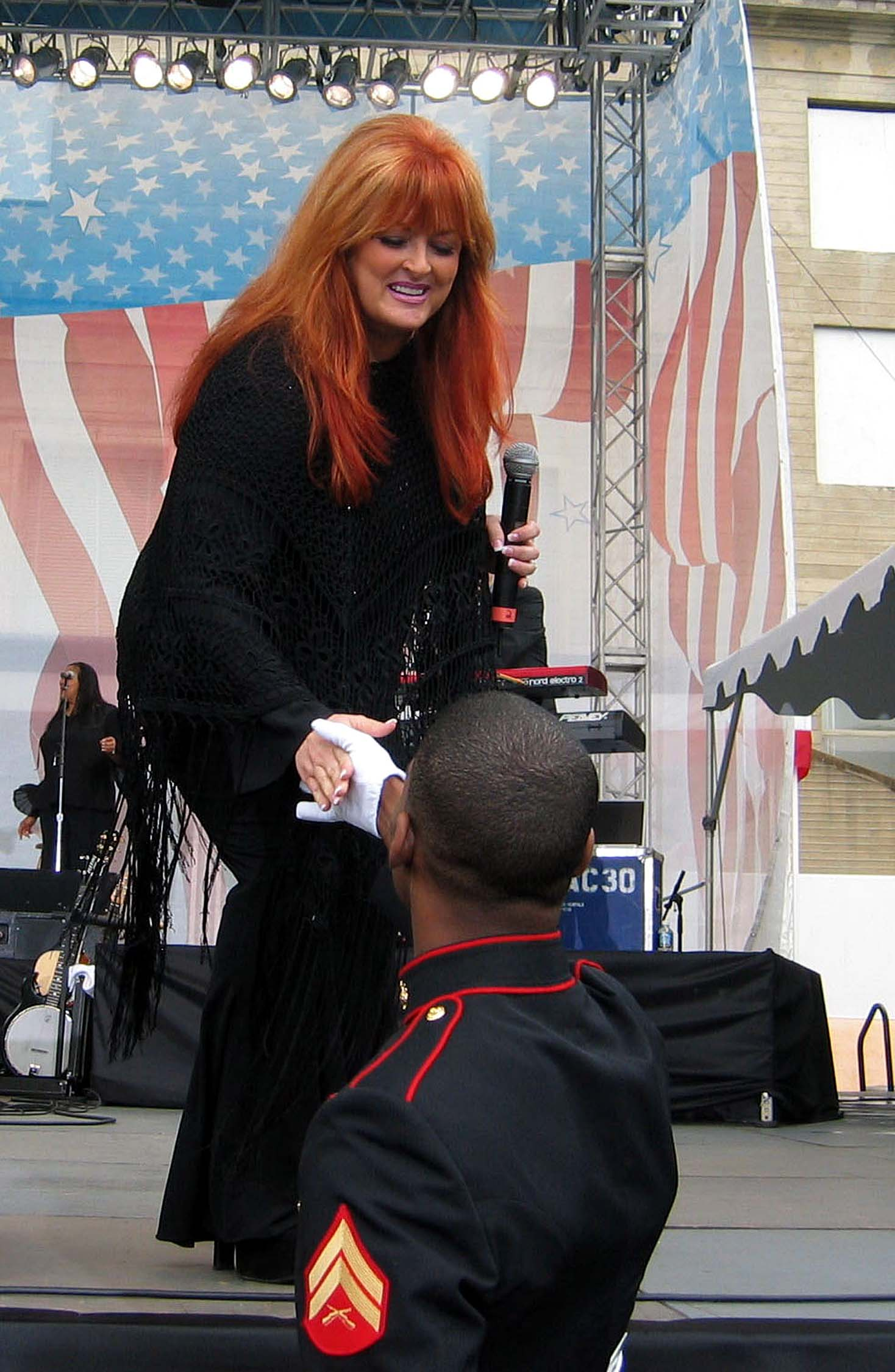
Wynonna topped the chart with her first solo album.

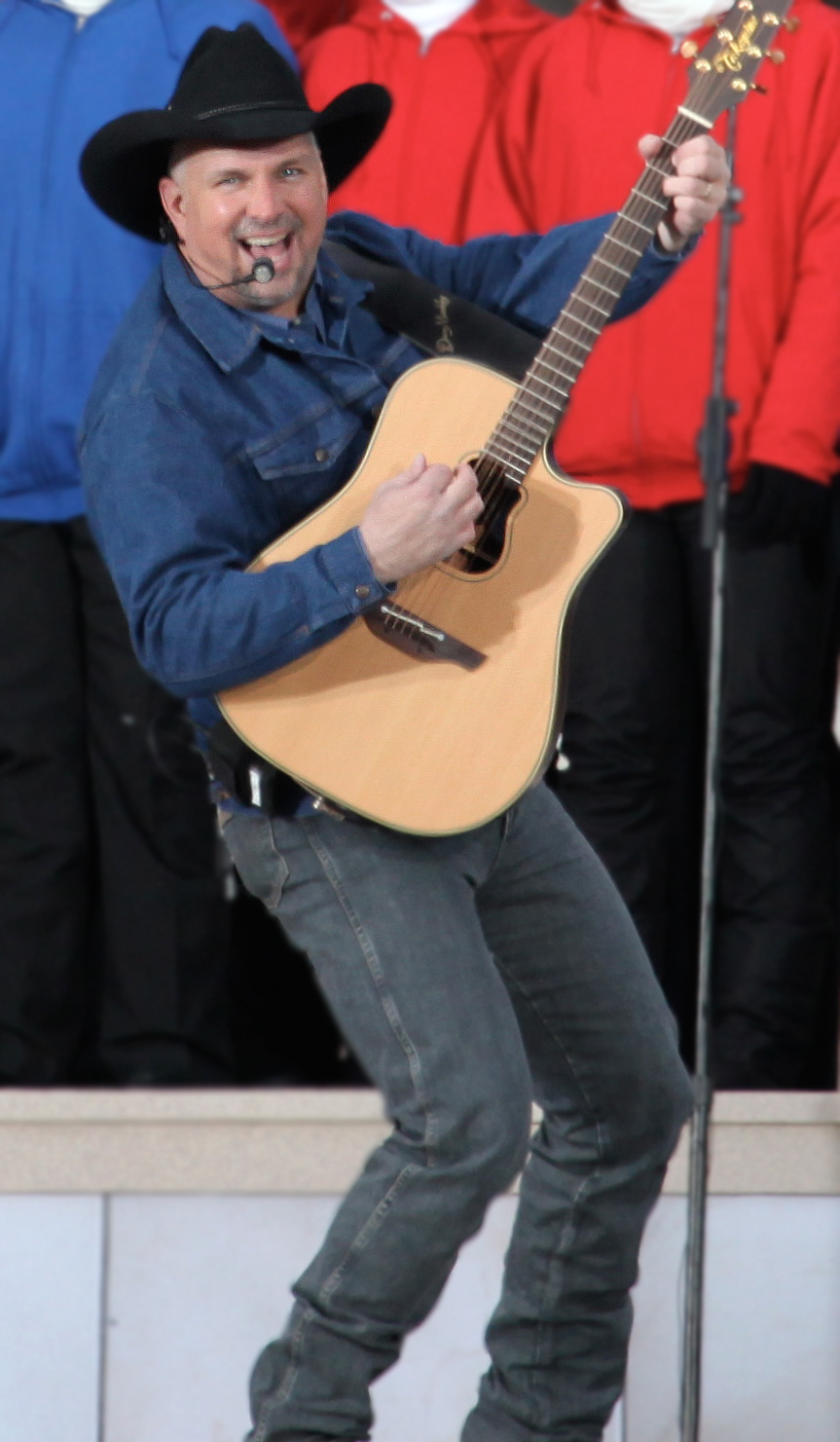
Garth Brooks spent more than half the year at number one.

Issue date	Title	Artist(s)	Ref.
January 4	Ropin' the Wind	Garth Brooks	
January 11	Ropin' the Wind	Garth Brooks	
January 18	Ropin' the Wind	Garth Brooks	
January 25	Ropin' the Wind	Garth Brooks	
February 1	Ropin' the Wind	Garth Brooks	
February 8	Ropin' the Wind	Garth Brooks	
February 15	Ropin' the Wind	Garth Brooks	
February 22	Ropin' the Wind	Garth Brooks	
February 29	Ropin' the Wind	Garth Brooks	
March 7	Ropin' the Wind	Garth Brooks	
March 14	Ropin' the Wind	Garth Brooks	
March 21	Ropin' the Wind	Garth Brooks	
March 28	Ropin' the Wind	Garth Brooks	
April 4	Ropin' the Wind	Garth Brooks	
April 11	Ropin' the Wind	Garth Brooks	
April 18	Wynonna	Wynonna	
April 25	Wynonna	Wynonna	
May 2	Wynonna	Wynonna	
May 9	Ropin' the Wind	Garth Brooks	
May 16	Ropin' the Wind	Garth Brooks	
May 23	Ropin' the Wind	Garth Brooks	
May 30	Ropin' the Wind	Garth Brooks	
June 6	Some Gave All	Billy Ray Cyrus	
June 13	Some Gave All	Billy Ray Cyrus	
June 20	Some Gave All	Billy Ray Cyrus	
June 27	Some Gave All	Billy Ray Cyrus	
July 4	Some Gave All	Billy Ray Cyrus	
July 11	Some Gave All	Billy Ray Cyrus	
July 18	Some Gave All	Billy Ray Cyrus	
July 25	Some Gave All	Billy Ray Cyrus	
August 1	Some Gave All	Billy Ray Cyrus	
August 8	Some Gave All	Billy Ray Cyrus	
August 15	Some Gave All	Billy Ray Cyrus	
August 22	Some Gave All	Billy Ray Cyrus	
August 29	Some Gave All	Billy Ray Cyrus	
September 5	Some Gave All	Billy Ray Cyrus	
September 12	Some Gave All	Billy Ray Cyrus	
September 19	Some Gave All	Billy Ray Cyrus	
September 26	Some Gave All	Billy Ray Cyrus	
October 3	Some Gave All	Billy Ray Cyrus	
October 10	The Chase	Garth Brooks	
October 17	The Chase	Garth Brooks	
October 24	The Chase	Garth Brooks	
October 31	The Chase	Garth Brooks	
November 7	The Chase	Garth Brooks	
November 14	The Chase	Garth Brooks	
November 21	The Chase	Garth Brooks	
November 28	The Chase	Garth Brooks	
December 5	The Chase	Garth Brooks	
December 12	The Chase	Garth Brooks	
December 19	The Chase	Garth Brooks	
December 26	The Chase	Garth Brooks	
