= List of Top Country Albums number ones of 1997 =

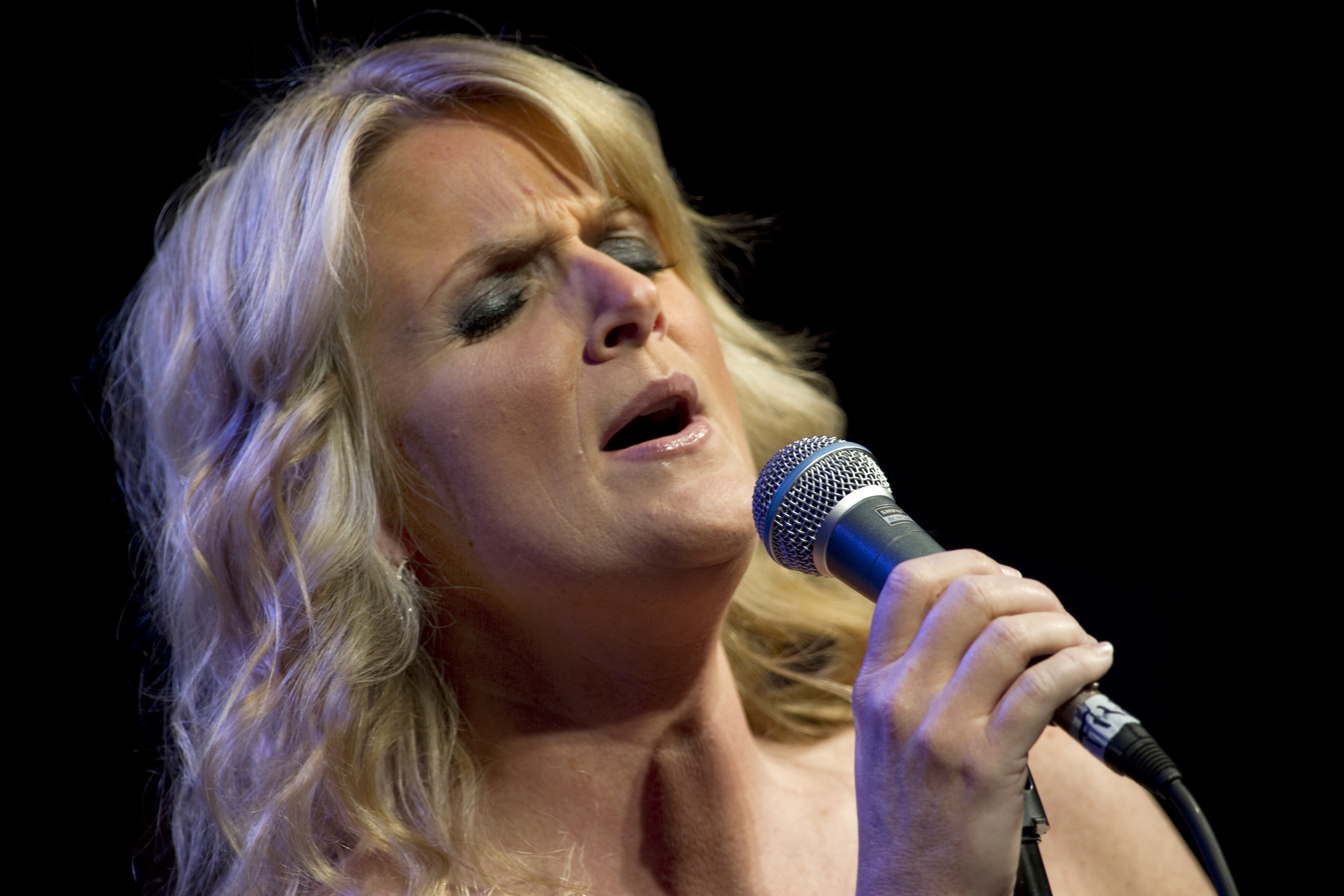
Compilation album (Songbook) A Collection of Hits gave Trisha Yearwood her first number one.

Top Country Albums is a chart that ranks the top-performing country music albums in the United States, published by Billboard. In 1997, eight different albums topped the chart, based on electronic point of sale data provided by SoundScan Inc.

The number-one position was occupied for more than half of the year by LeAnn Rimes, who had first topped the chart the previous year when she was 13 years old. In the issue of Billboard dated January 4, Rimes held the top spot with her album Blue, the record's 20th week in the top spot. Blue occupied the peak position for the first eight weeks of 1997, after which it was displaced by Unchained Melody: The Early Years, also by Rimes. This was a compilation of tracks released to capitalize on the success of her first major-label album, and consisted mostly of tracks from the independent album All That, originally released when she was aged 11. It spent 10 consecutive weeks at number one, meaning that Rimes occupied the top spot from the start of the year until early May. In September, Blue spent one final week at number one and then Rimes returned to the top spot with her next album You Light Up My Life: Inspirational Songs, which spent eight weeks atop the chart, giving the teenage singer a total of 27 weeks at number one in 1997.

In November, Canadian singer Shania Twain entered the chart at number one with the album Come On Over. The album initially only spent three weeks at number one, but would return to the top spot repeatedly, eventually spending a total of 50 weeks at number one, making it the longest-running chart-topper in the history of the Top Country Albums listing. In 2000, it was recognized by the Recording Industry Association of America as the highest-selling album of all time by a female artist, as well as the biggest-selling country album. The year's final number one was Sevens by Garth Brooks, which also topped the all-genre Billboard 200 chart. It was the singer's fifth consecutive number one and his ninth consecutive multi-platinum album. Three months earlier, Trisha Yearwood, who would marry Brooks in 2005, gained her first number one with (Songbook) A Collection of Hits.

== Chart history ==
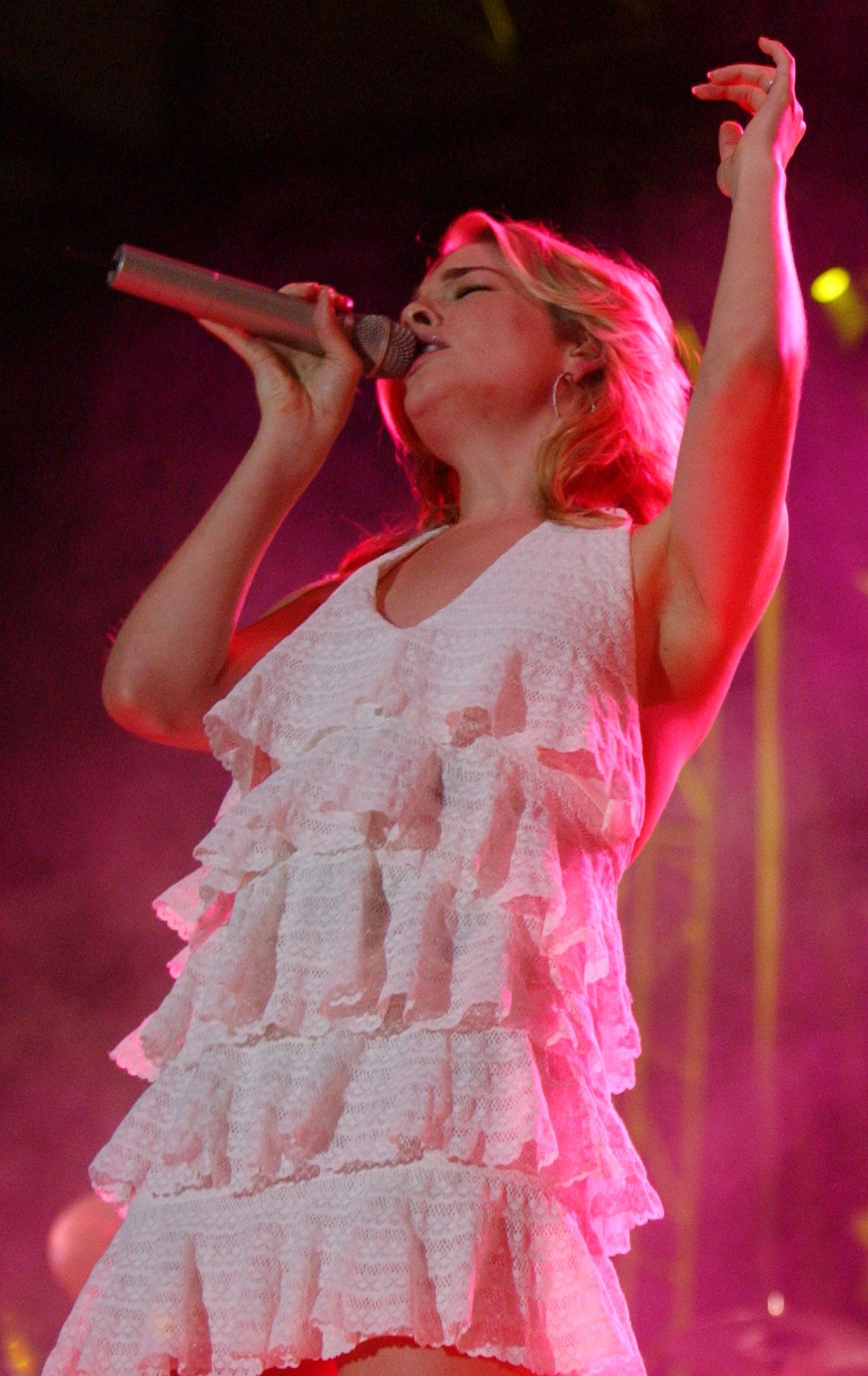
LeAnn Rimes had three number ones in 1997, which between them spent more than half of the year in the top spot.

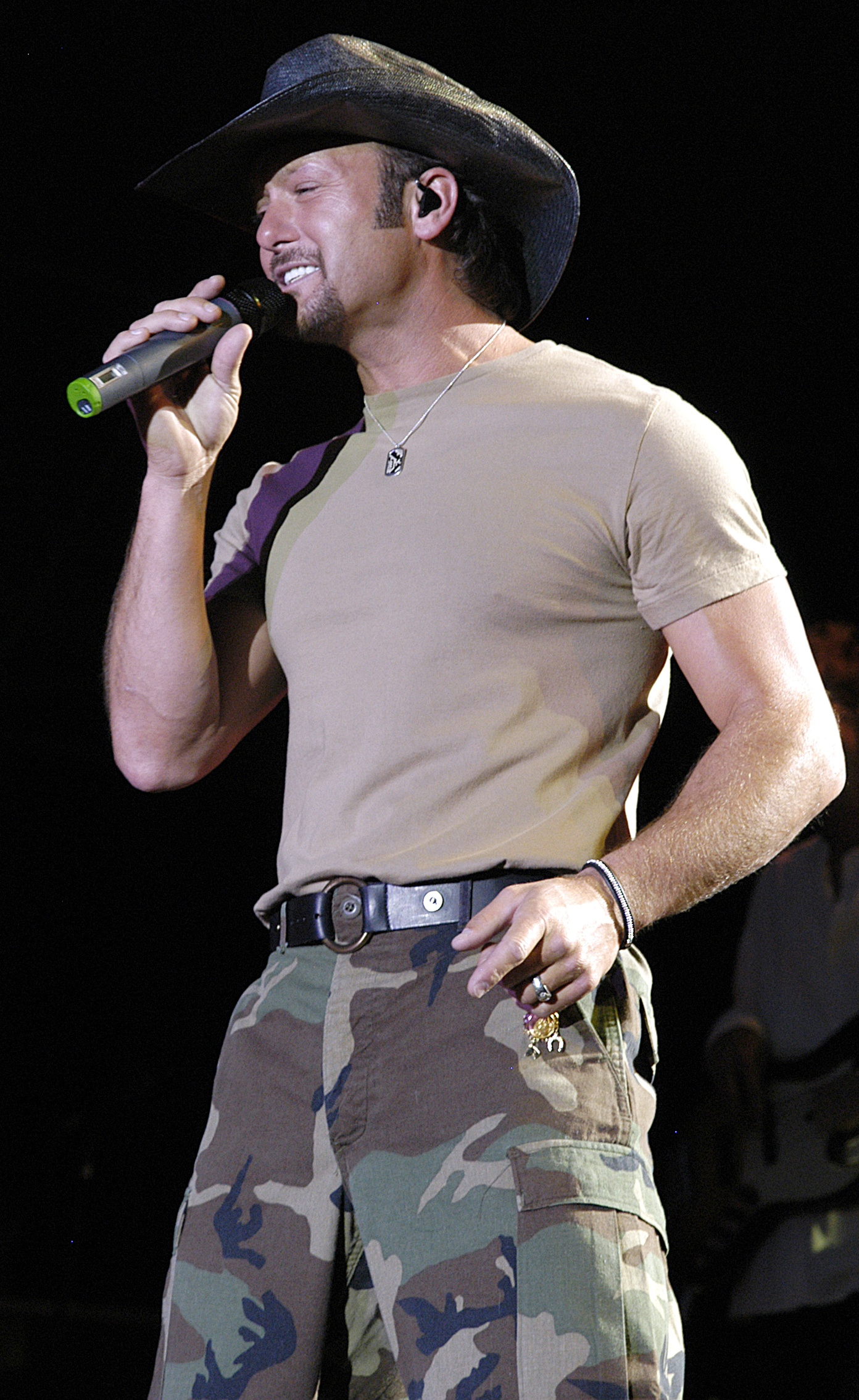
Everywhere was a chart-topper for Tim McGraw.

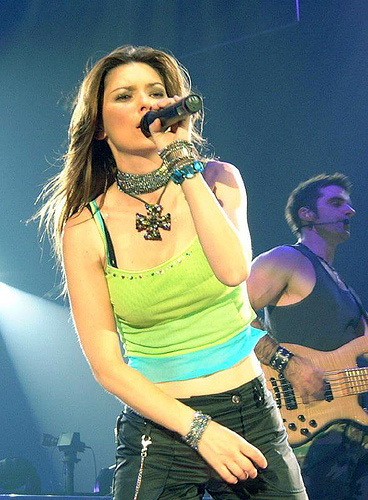
Shania Twain reached number one in November with Come On Over, which would go on to become the longest-running chart-topper in the history of the Top Country Albums listing.

Issue date	Title	Artist(s)	Ref.
January 4	Blue	LeAnn Rimes	
January 11	Blue	LeAnn Rimes	
January 18	Blue	LeAnn Rimes	
January 25	Blue	LeAnn Rimes	
February 1	Blue	LeAnn Rimes	
February 8	Blue	LeAnn Rimes	
February 15	Blue	LeAnn Rimes	
February 22	Blue	LeAnn Rimes	
March 1	Unchained Melody: The Early Years	LeAnn Rimes	
March 8	Unchained Melody: The Early Years	LeAnn Rimes	
March 15	Unchained Melody: The Early Years	LeAnn Rimes	
March 22	Unchained Melody: The Early Years	LeAnn Rimes	
March 29	Unchained Melody: The Early Years	LeAnn Rimes	
April 5	Unchained Melody: The Early Years	LeAnn Rimes	
April 12	Unchained Melody: The Early Years	LeAnn Rimes	
April 19	Unchained Melody: The Early Years	LeAnn Rimes	
April 26	Unchained Melody: The Early Years	LeAnn Rimes	
May 3	Unchained Melody: The Early Years	LeAnn Rimes	
May 10	Carrying Your Love with Me	George Strait	
May 17	Carrying Your Love with Me	George Strait	
May 24	Carrying Your Love with Me	George Strait	
May 31	Carrying Your Love with Me	George Strait	
June 7	Carrying Your Love with Me	George Strait	
June 14	Carrying Your Love with Me	George Strait	
June 21	Everywhere	Tim McGraw	
June 28	Everywhere	Tim McGraw	
July 5	Everywhere	Tim McGraw	
July 12	Everywhere	Tim McGraw	
July 19	Everywhere	Tim McGraw	
July 26	Everywhere	Tim McGraw	
August 2	Everywhere	Tim McGraw	
August 9	Everywhere	Tim McGraw	
August 16	Everywhere	Tim McGraw	
August 23	Everywhere	Tim McGraw	
August 30	Everywhere	Tim McGraw	
September 6	Blue	LeAnn Rimes	
September 13	(Songbook) A Collection of Hits	Trisha Yearwood	
September 20	(Songbook) A Collection of Hits	Trisha Yearwood	
September 27	You Light Up My Life: Inspirational Songs	LeAnn Rimes	
October 4	You Light Up My Life: Inspirational Songs	LeAnn Rimes	
October 11	You Light Up My Life: Inspirational Songs	LeAnn Rimes	
October 18	You Light Up My Life: Inspirational Songs	LeAnn Rimes	
October 25	You Light Up My Life: Inspirational Songs	LeAnn Rimes	
November 1	You Light Up My Life: Inspirational Songs	LeAnn Rimes	
November 8	You Light Up My Life: Inspirational Songs	LeAnn Rimes	
November 15	You Light Up My Life: Inspirational Songs	LeAnn Rimes	
November 22	Come On Over	Shania Twain	
November 29	Come On Over	Shania Twain	
December 6	Come On Over	Shania Twain	
December 13	Sevens	Garth Brooks	
December 20	Sevens	Garth Brooks	
December 27	Sevens	Garth Brooks	
