= List of Top Country Albums number ones of 1995 =

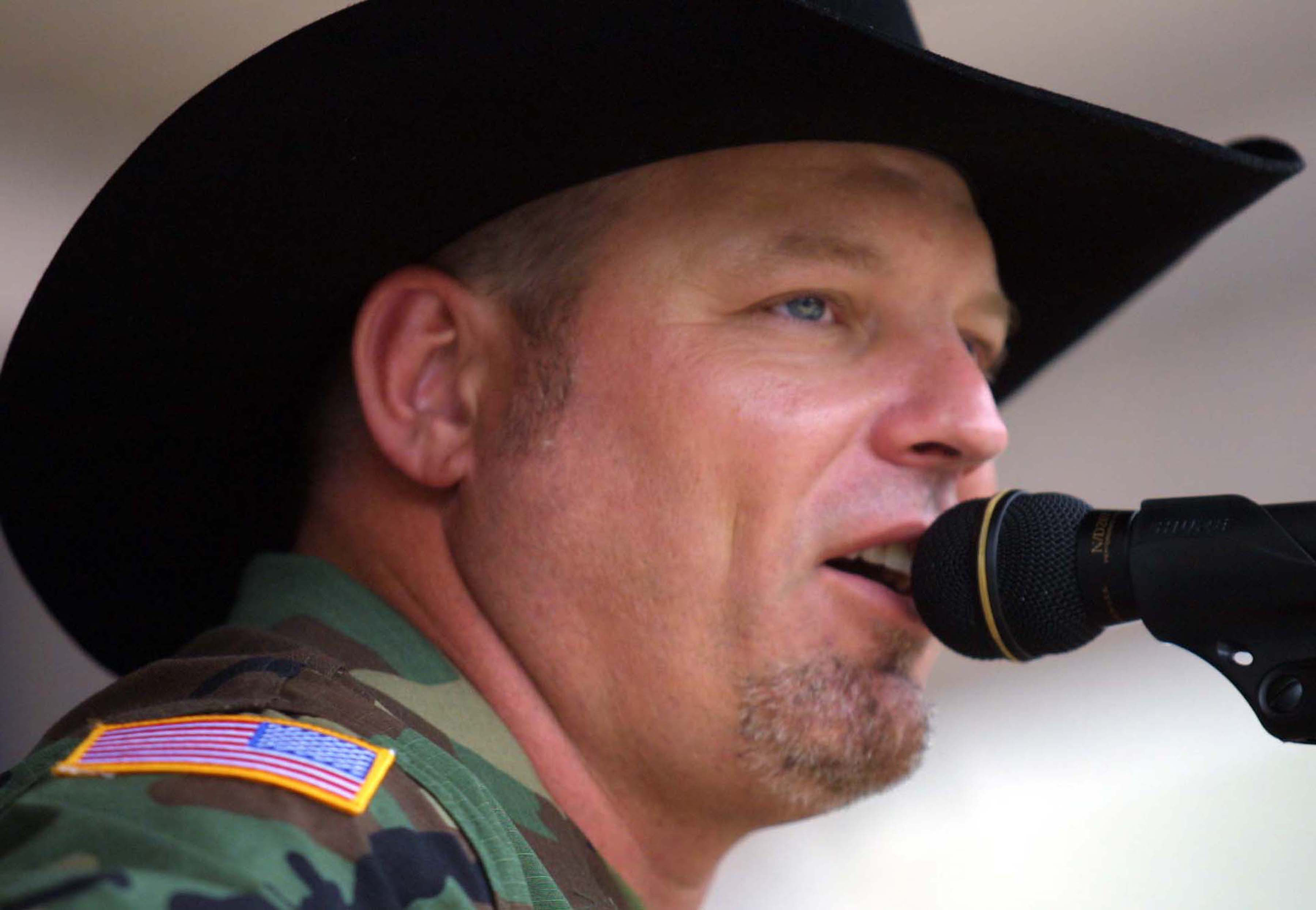
John Michael Montgomery spent 13 consecutive weeks at number one with his eponymous album.

Top Country Albums is a chart that ranks the top-performing country music albums in the United States, published by Billboard. In 1995, seven different albums topped the chart, based on electronic point of sale data provided by SoundScan Inc.

In the issue of Billboard dated January 7, Garth Brooks was at number one with the compilation album The Hits, its second week in the top spot. The album held the peak position for the first 14 weeks of 1995 and returned to number one for a single week later in the year; its 16 weeks atop the chart took Brooks's total number of weeks in the top spot to 113 in less than five years. The singer returned to number one in December with his next album Fresh Horses, which held the top spot for the final four weeks of the year; he was the only artist to achieve more than one chart-topper during 1995. The Hits was replaced at number one by the eponymous album by John Michael Montgomery, which entered the chart at number one in the issue of Billboard dated April 15 and spent 13 consecutive weeks in the top spot. It was Montgomery's second consecutive chart-topper, but would prove to be his last album to reach number one.

In July, Shania Twain gained her first number one with The Woman in Me; the album spent 11 weeks in the top spot in 1995 but would return to number one for a further 18 weeks the following year, making it the longest-running number one country album to date by a female artist. The album launched the Canadian singer to stardom in both the country and pop markets, and helped to make her one of the most globally successful recording artists of the 1990s. While Garth Brooks's The Hits was the only one of 1995's Top Country Albums number ones to also top the all-genre Billboard 200 chart, every other country chart-topper reached the top five of that listing. In the mid-1990s, sales of country albums reached unprecedented levels, with Brooks and Twain in particular experiencing levels of mainstream popularity and success unheard of for a country artist; both The Hits and The Woman in Me would go on to be certified at least ten times platinum by the Recording Industry Association of America.

== Chart history ==
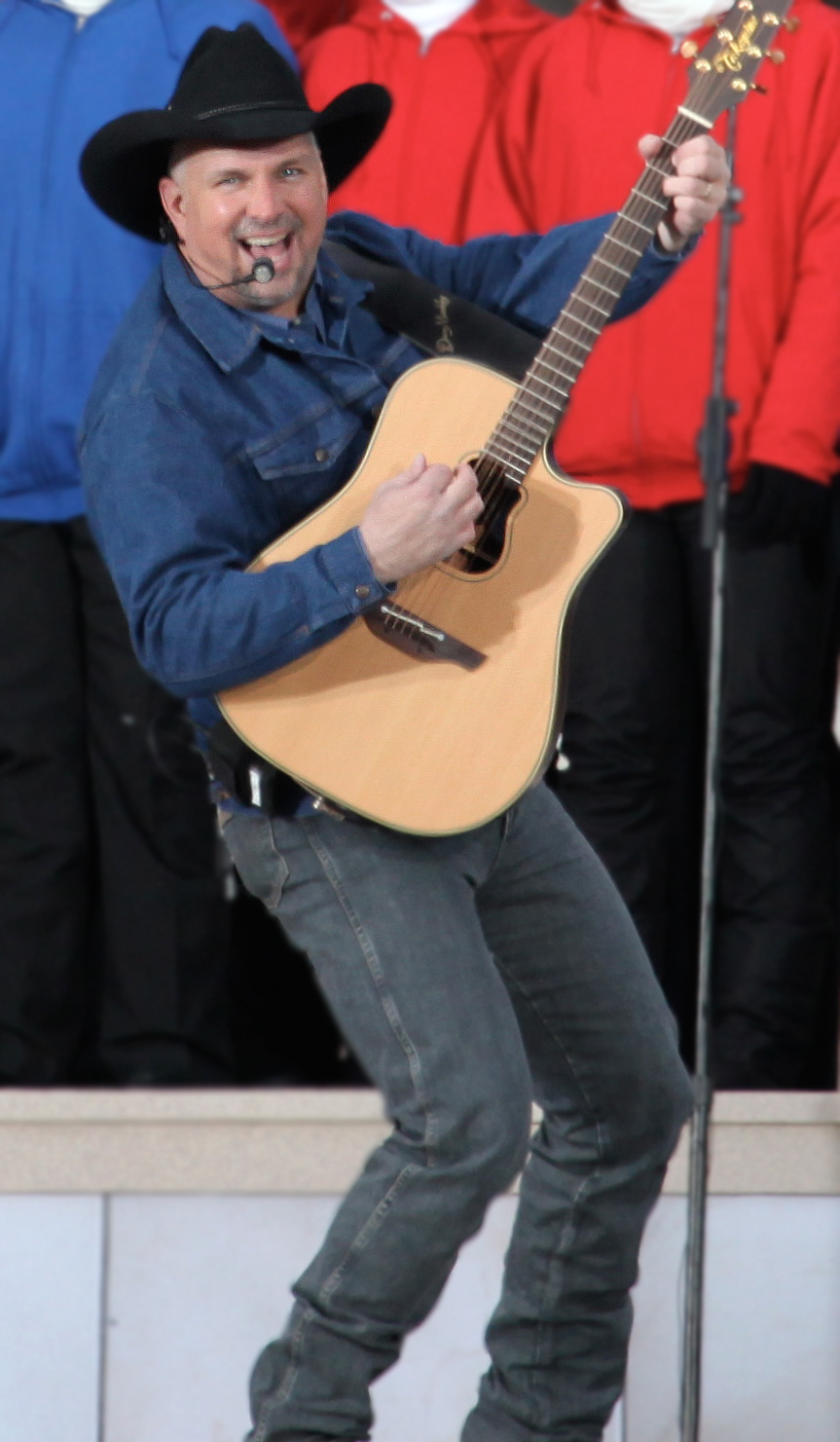
Garth Brooks both began and ended the year at number one.

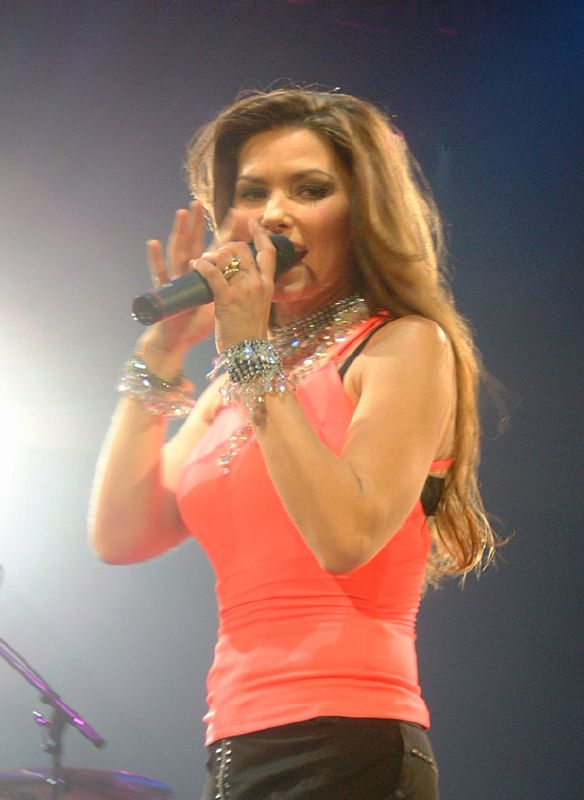
Shania Twain reached number one for the first time with The Woman in Me.

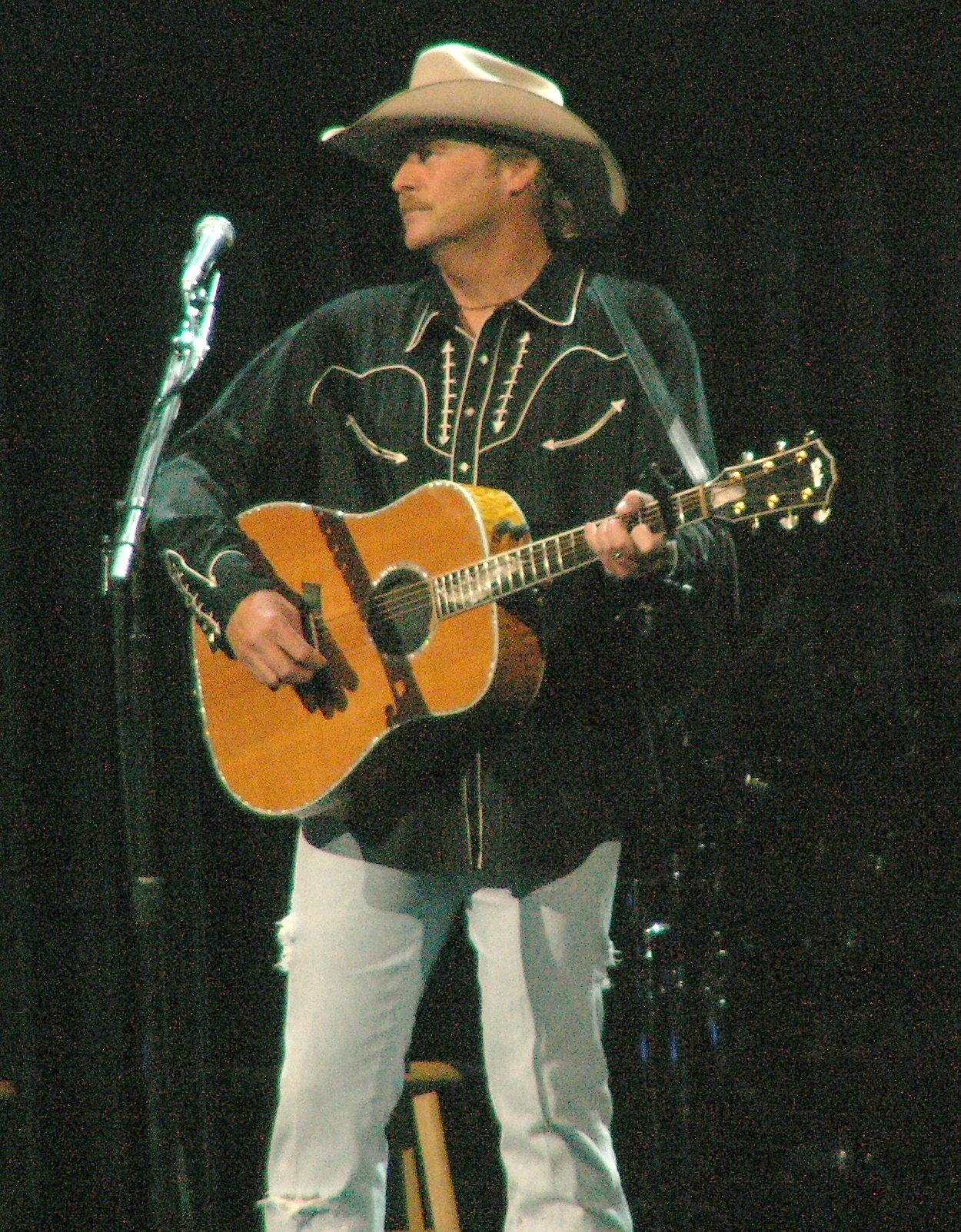
Alan Jackson topped the chart with The Greatest Hits Collection.

Issue date	Title	Artist(s)	Ref.
January 7	The Hits	Garth Brooks	
January 14	The Hits	Garth Brooks	
January 21	The Hits	Garth Brooks	
January 28	The Hits	Garth Brooks	
February 4	The Hits	Garth Brooks	
February 11	The Hits	Garth Brooks	
February 18	The Hits	Garth Brooks	
February 25	The Hits	Garth Brooks	
March 4	The Hits	Garth Brooks	
March 11	The Hits	Garth Brooks	
March 18	The Hits	Garth Brooks	
March 25	The Hits	Garth Brooks	
April 1	The Hits	Garth Brooks	
April 8	The Hits	Garth Brooks	
April 15	John Michael Montgomery	John Michael Montgomery	
April 22	John Michael Montgomery	John Michael Montgomery	
April 29	John Michael Montgomery	John Michael Montgomery	
May 6	John Michael Montgomery	John Michael Montgomery	
May 13	John Michael Montgomery	John Michael Montgomery	
May 20	John Michael Montgomery	John Michael Montgomery	
May 27	John Michael Montgomery	John Michael Montgomery	
June 3	John Michael Montgomery	John Michael Montgomery	
June 10	John Michael Montgomery	John Michael Montgomery	
June 17	John Michael Montgomery	John Michael Montgomery	
June 24	John Michael Montgomery	John Michael Montgomery	
July 1	John Michael Montgomery	John Michael Montgomery	
July 8	John Michael Montgomery	John Michael Montgomery	
July 15	The Hits	Garth Brooks	
July 22	The Woman in Me	Shania Twain	
July 29	The Woman in Me	Shania Twain	
August 5	The Woman in Me	Shania Twain	
August 12	The Woman in Me	Shania Twain	
August 19	The Woman in Me	Shania Twain	
August 26	The Woman in Me	Shania Twain	
September 2	The Woman in Me	Shania Twain	
September 9	The Woman in Me	Shania Twain	
September 16	The Woman in Me	Shania Twain	
September 23	The Woman in Me	Shania Twain	
September 30	The Woman in Me	Shania Twain	
October 7	All I Want	Tim McGraw	
October 14	All I Want	Tim McGraw	
October 21	Starting Over	Reba McEntire	
October 28	Starting Over	Reba McEntire	
November 4	All I Want	Tim McGraw	
November 11	The Greatest Hits Collection	Alan Jackson	
November 18	The Greatest Hits Collection	Alan Jackson	
November 25	The Greatest Hits Collection	Alan Jackson	
December 2	The Greatest Hits Collection	Alan Jackson	
December 9	Fresh Horses	Garth Brooks	
December 16	Fresh Horses	Garth Brooks	
December 23	Fresh Horses	Garth Brooks	
December 30	Fresh Horses	Garth Brooks	
