= List of Top Country Albums number ones of 1991 =

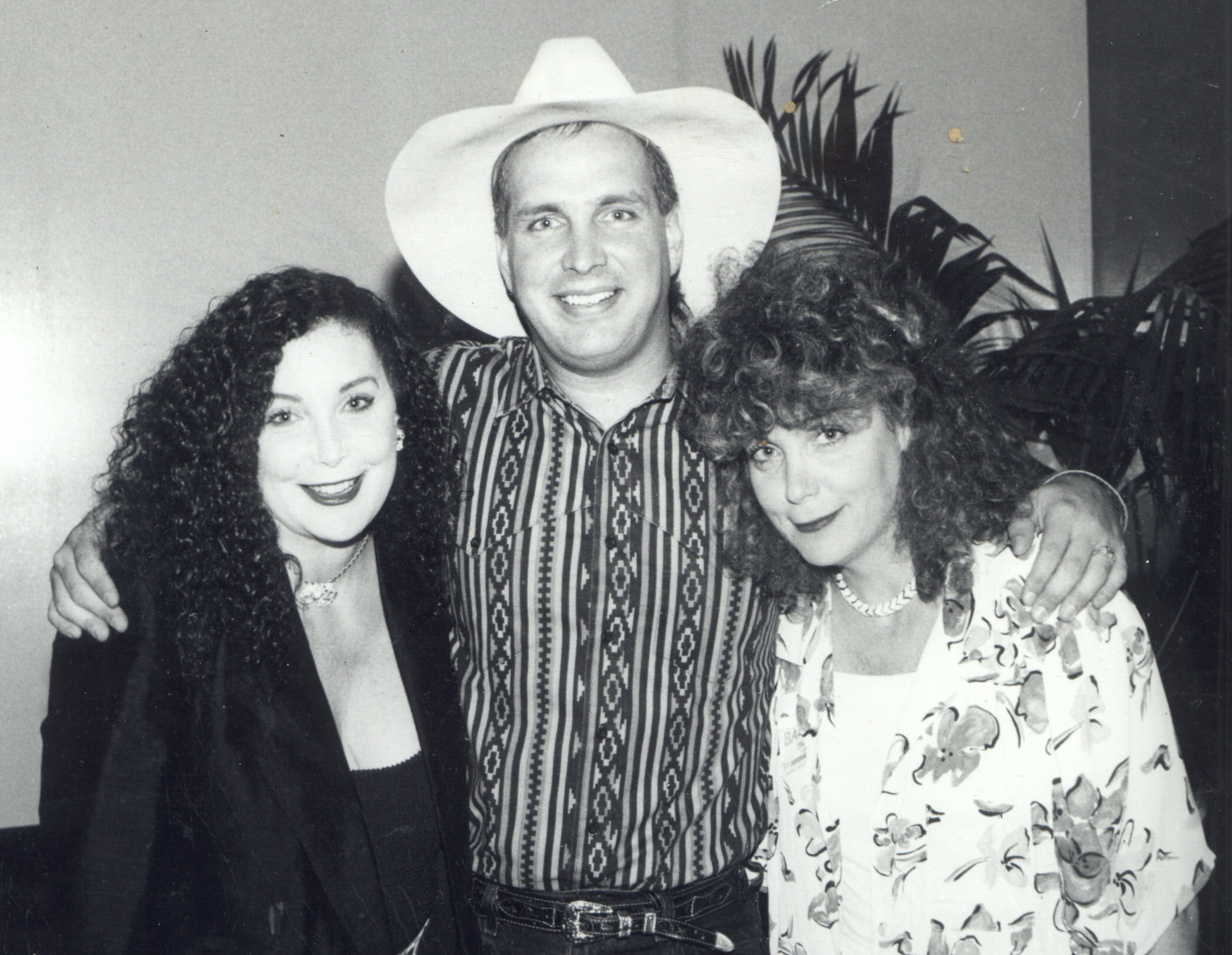
Garth Brooks (center) spent almost all of 1991 at number one.

Top Country Albums is a chart that ranks the top-performing country music albums in the United States, published by Billboard. In 1991, four different albums topped the chart; with effect from the issue dated May 25, Billboard changed its methodology for compiling the chart, basing it on electronic point of sale data provided by SoundScan Inc. rather than the method used since the chart's instigation of relying on sales reports submitted by a representative sample of stores nationwide.

In 1991, the top of the chart was dominated almost completely by Garth Brooks, who was at number one for 46 weeks of the year. Brooks had reached number one for the first time in October of the previous year with No Fences. Having been displaced by Put Yourself in My Shoes by Clint Black, the album returned to the top spot in February 1991 and remained atop the chart for 14 consecutive weeks. After one week out of the peak position, it returned to number one and remained there for a further 18 weeks. Its final total of 41 weeks at number one made it the second-longest-running Top Country Albums number one to date. When it was finally displaced from the top spot, it was by Brooks's next album, Ropin' the Wind, which went straight into the chart at number one in the issue of Billboard dated September 28, beginning a run of 29 consecutive weeks atop the chart. In the same week it became the first country album to debut at number one on the all-genres Billboard 200 Top Albums chart.

In addition to his success on the country charts, Brooks experienced a level of mainstream popularity and success in the early 1990s unprecedented for a country artist; by the end of 1991 No Fences was recognized as the highest-selling country album of all time, and by 2019 it had sold 17 million copies. Brooks is ranked by the Recording Industry Association of America as the best-selling solo albums artist in the United States of any genre with more than 130 million domestic units sold by 2015, second only to the Beatles in overall album sales. The only other artist to top the chart in 1991 was Dolly Parton, who spent a single week in the top spot in May with Eagle When She Flies. Although she had topped the chart in 1987 with a collaborative album with Linda Ronstadt and Emmylou Harris, Eagle When She Flies was Parton's first solo album for more than 10 years to reach number one. Its single week atop the chart interrupted what would otherwise have been a 14-month hold by Brooks on the number-one position.

== Chart history ==
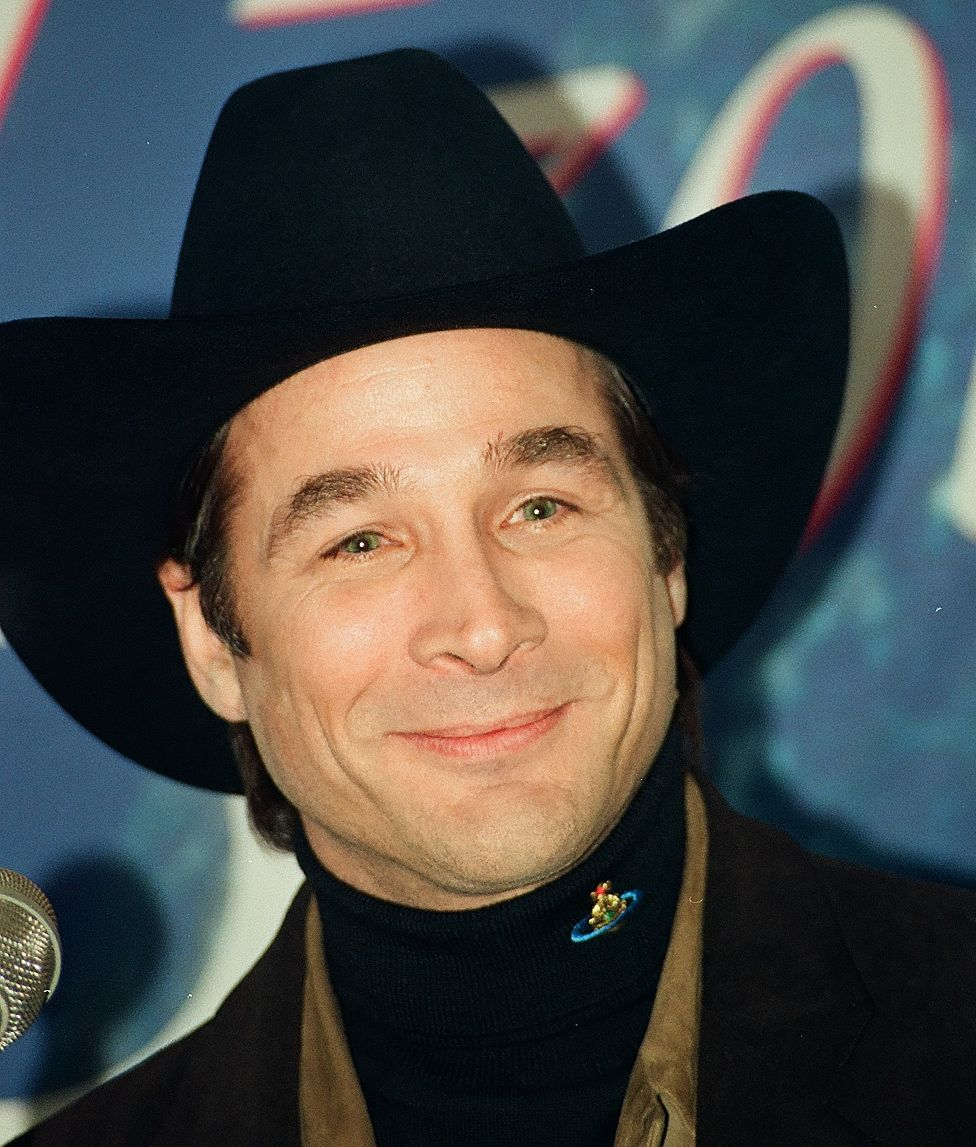
Clint Black began the week at number one.

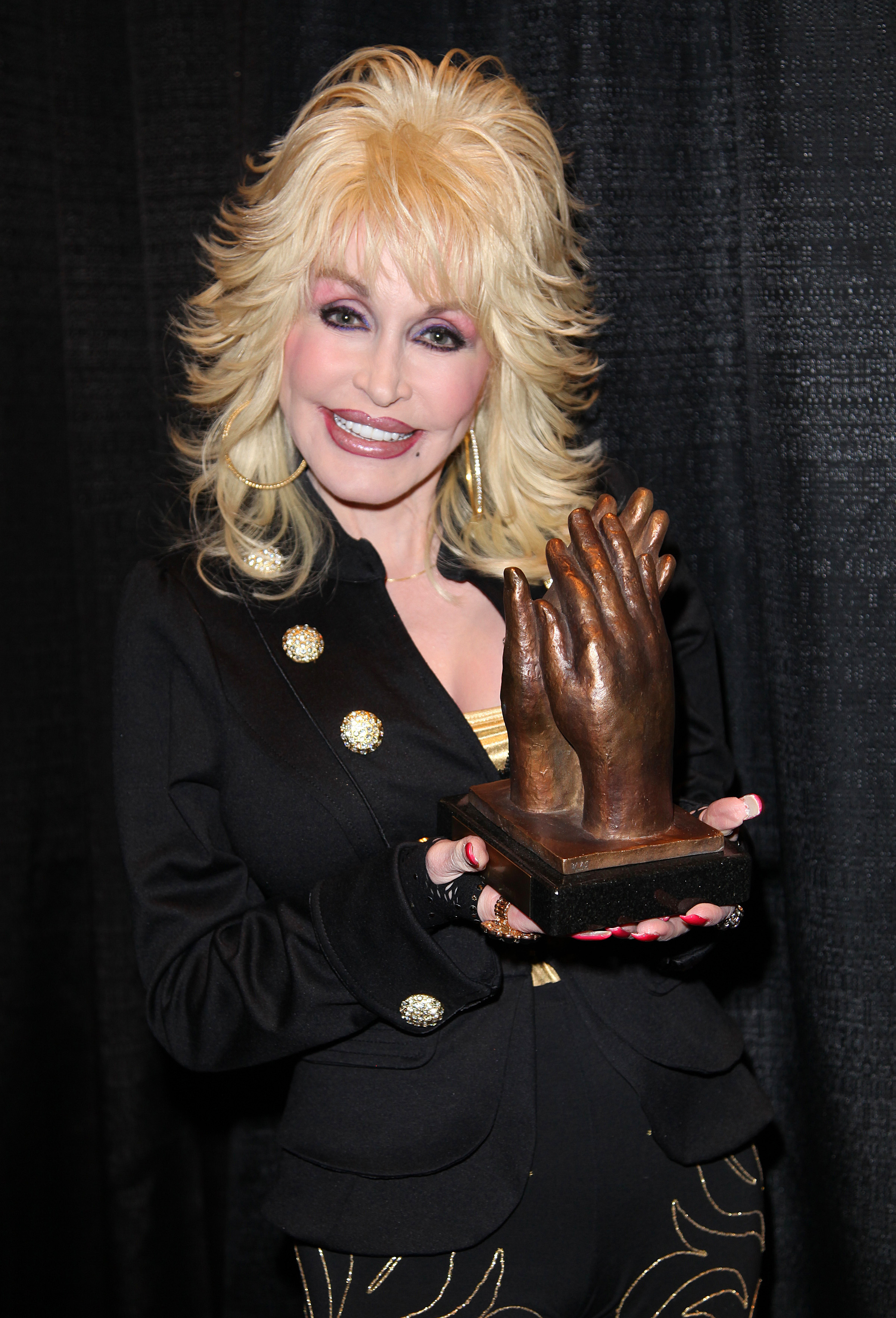
Dolly Parton had her first solo chart-topper for ten years with Eagle When She Flies.

Issue date	Title	Artist(s)	Ref.
January 5	Put Yourself in My Shoes	Clint Black	
January 12	Put Yourself in My Shoes	Clint Black	
January 19	Put Yourself in My Shoes	Clint Black	
January 26	Put Yourself in My Shoes	Clint Black	
February 2	Put Yourself in My Shoes	Clint Black	
February 9	No Fences	Garth Brooks	
February 16	No Fences	Garth Brooks	
February 23	No Fences	Garth Brooks	
March 2	No Fences	Garth Brooks	
March 9	No Fences	Garth Brooks	
March 16	No Fences	Garth Brooks	
March 23	No Fences	Garth Brooks	
March 30	No Fences	Garth Brooks	
April 6	No Fences	Garth Brooks	
April 13	No Fences	Garth Brooks	
April 20	No Fences	Garth Brooks	
April 27	No Fences	Garth Brooks	
May 4	No Fences	Garth Brooks	
May 11	No Fences	Garth Brooks	
May 18	Eagle When She Flies	Dolly Parton	
May 25	No Fences	Garth Brooks	
June 1	No Fences	Garth Brooks	
June 8	No Fences	Garth Brooks	
June 15	No Fences	Garth Brooks	
June 22	No Fences	Garth Brooks	
June 29	No Fences	Garth Brooks	
July 6	No Fences	Garth Brooks	
July 13	No Fences	Garth Brooks	
July 20	No Fences	Garth Brooks	
July 27	No Fences	Garth Brooks	
August 3	No Fences	Garth Brooks	
August 10	No Fences	Garth Brooks	
August 17	No Fences	Garth Brooks	
August 24	No Fences	Garth Brooks	
August 31	No Fences	Garth Brooks	
September 7	No Fences	Garth Brooks	
September 14	No Fences	Garth Brooks	
September 21	No Fences	Garth Brooks	
September 28	Ropin' the Wind	Garth Brooks	
October 5	Ropin' the Wind	Garth Brooks	
October 12	Ropin' the Wind	Garth Brooks	
October 19	Ropin' the Wind	Garth Brooks	
October 26	Ropin' the Wind	Garth Brooks	
November 2	Ropin' the Wind	Garth Brooks	
November 9	Ropin' the Wind	Garth Brooks	
November 16	Ropin' the Wind	Garth Brooks	
November 23	Ropin' the Wind	Garth Brooks	
November 30	Ropin' the Wind	Garth Brooks	
December 7	Ropin' the Wind	Garth Brooks	
December 14	Ropin' the Wind	Garth Brooks	
December 21	Ropin' the Wind	Garth Brooks	
December 28	Ropin' the Wind	Garth Brooks	
