= List of Top Country LPs number ones of 1983 =

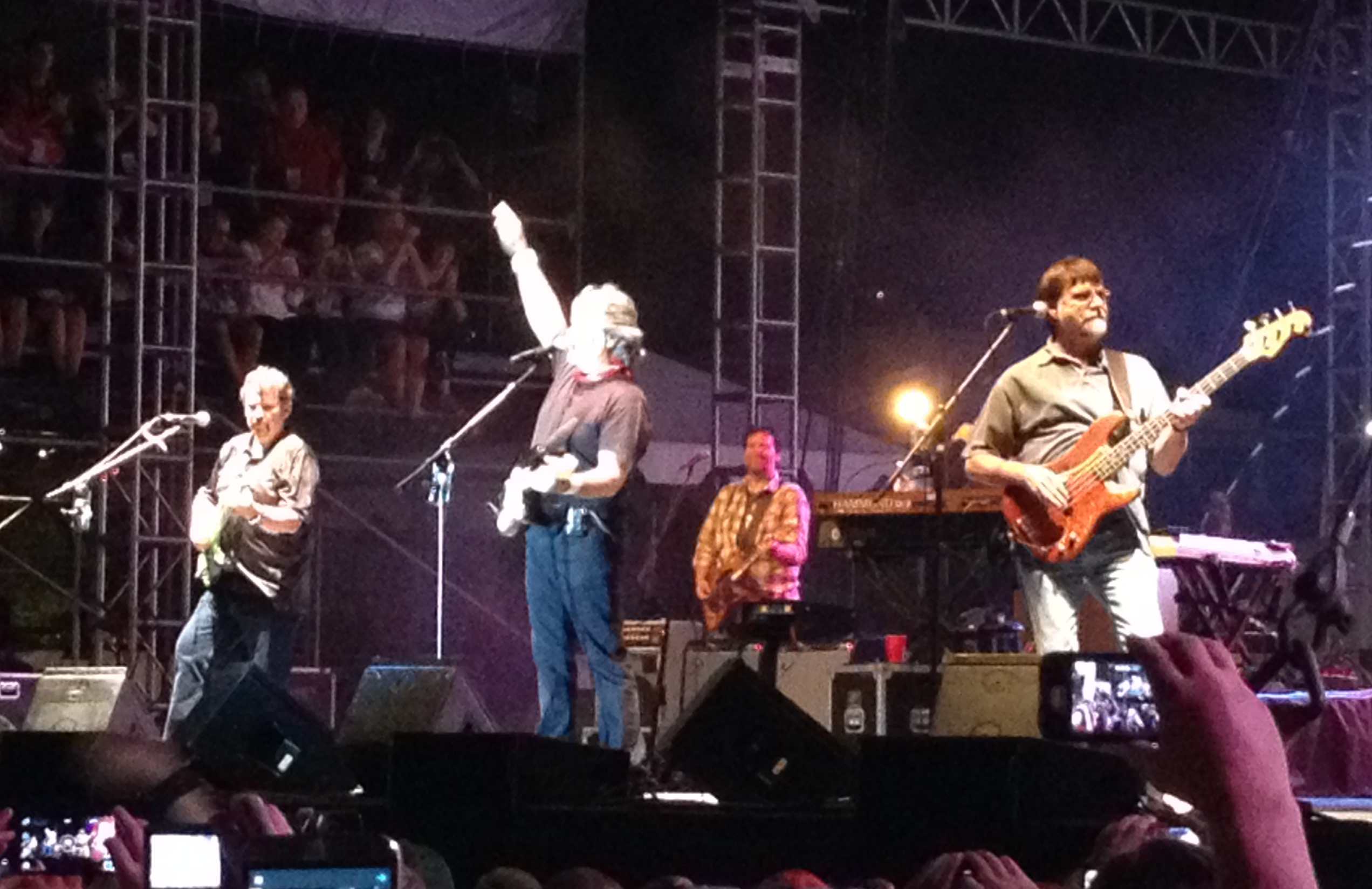
The band Alabama spent the most weeks at number one in 1983.

Top Country Albums is a chart that ranks the top-performing country music albums in the United States, published by Billboard. In 1983, four different albums topped the chart, which was at the time published under the title Top Country LPs, based on sales reports submitted by a representative sample of stores nationwide.

The top of the chart was dominated in 1983 by the band Alabama, which spent 35 weeks at number one during the course of the year. At the start of the year the band held the top spot with its album Mountain Music, which had already spent 14 weeks at number one the previous year and added a further 14 in 1983. Its total of 28 weeks atop the country albums listing tied the record set by the band with its previous album Feels So Right in 1982. One week after Mountain Music was displaced from number one, the band was back in the top spot with its next album, The Closer You Get..., which spent 21 weeks atop the chart. Alabama would go on to become the most successful country act of the 1980s, with ten number one LPs during the decade, a run interrupted only by the seasonal album Christmas in 1985. Mountain Music was the band's best-selling LP, selling over 5 million copies.

Two albums not by Alabama reached the top spot during the year. The first was Pancho & Lefty, a collaborative LP by two of country's most successful solo artists, Merle Haggard and Willie Nelson, which first topped the chart for a single week in April, interrupting what would otherwise have been a continuous run at number one by Alabama from the start of the year into July. It made four returns to the top of the chart, each time displacing Alabama's The Closer You Get..., for an eventual total of eight weeks at number one. In the issue of Billboard dated October 29, Kenny Rogers reached number one with Eyes That See in the Dark, which retained the top spot for the remainder of the year. The album relied heavily on the songwriting of Barry Gibb of the pop group the Bee Gees, who was also involved in its production, and was strongly pop-music influenced. It featured the track "Islands in the Stream", a duet with Dolly Parton, which reached number one on the all-genres Billboard Hot 100, and in 2005 topped a poll run by country music television channel CMT of the best country duets of all time. Every act that reached number one on the country LPs listing in 1983 has been inducted into the Country Music Hall of Fame; Nelson was the first to be inducted, in 1993, followed by Haggard in 1994, Alabama in 2005, and Rogers in 2013.

== Chart history ==
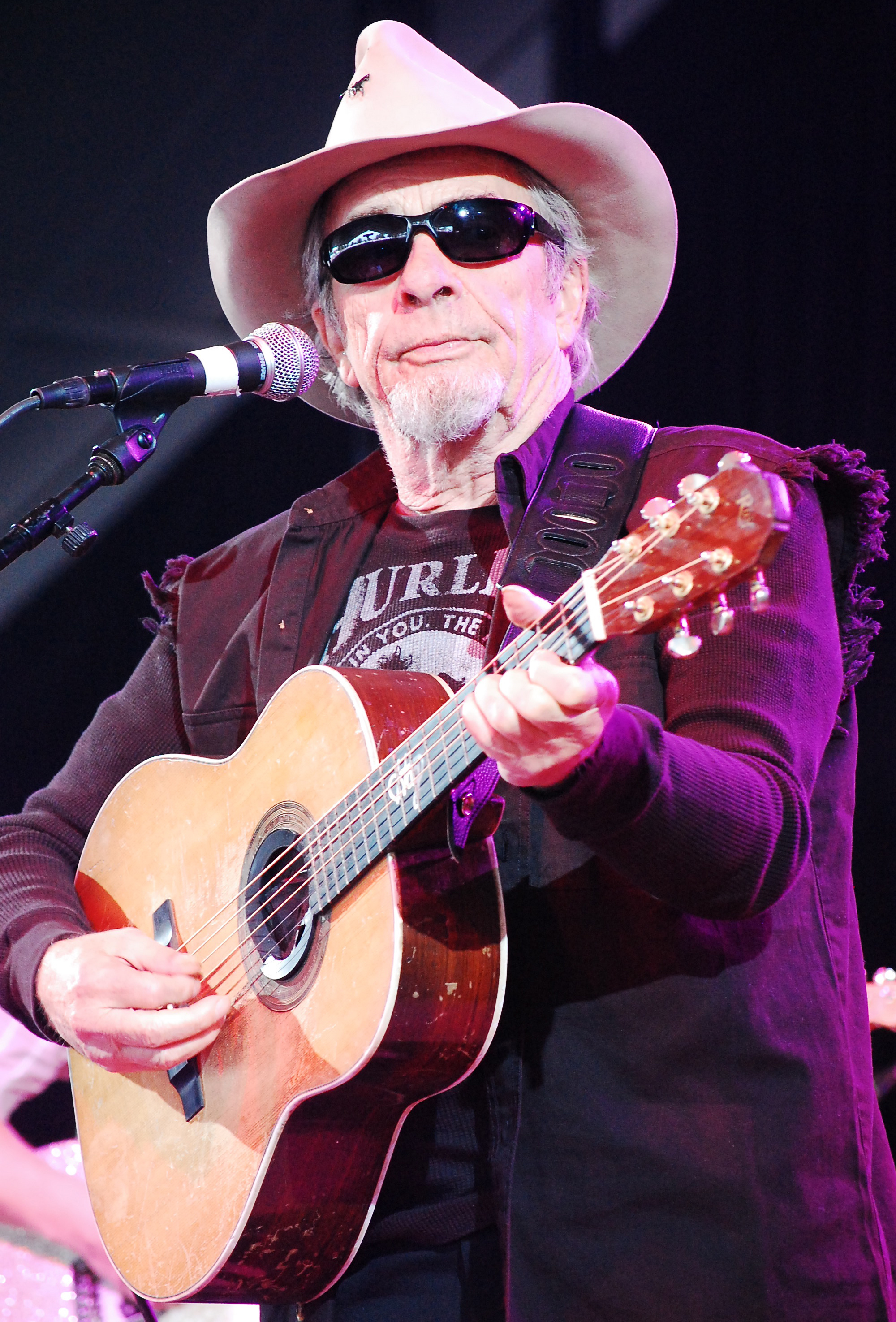
Merle Haggard collaborated with Willie Nelson on the album Pancho & Lefty, the only album to displace Alabama from the top spot in the first half of the year.

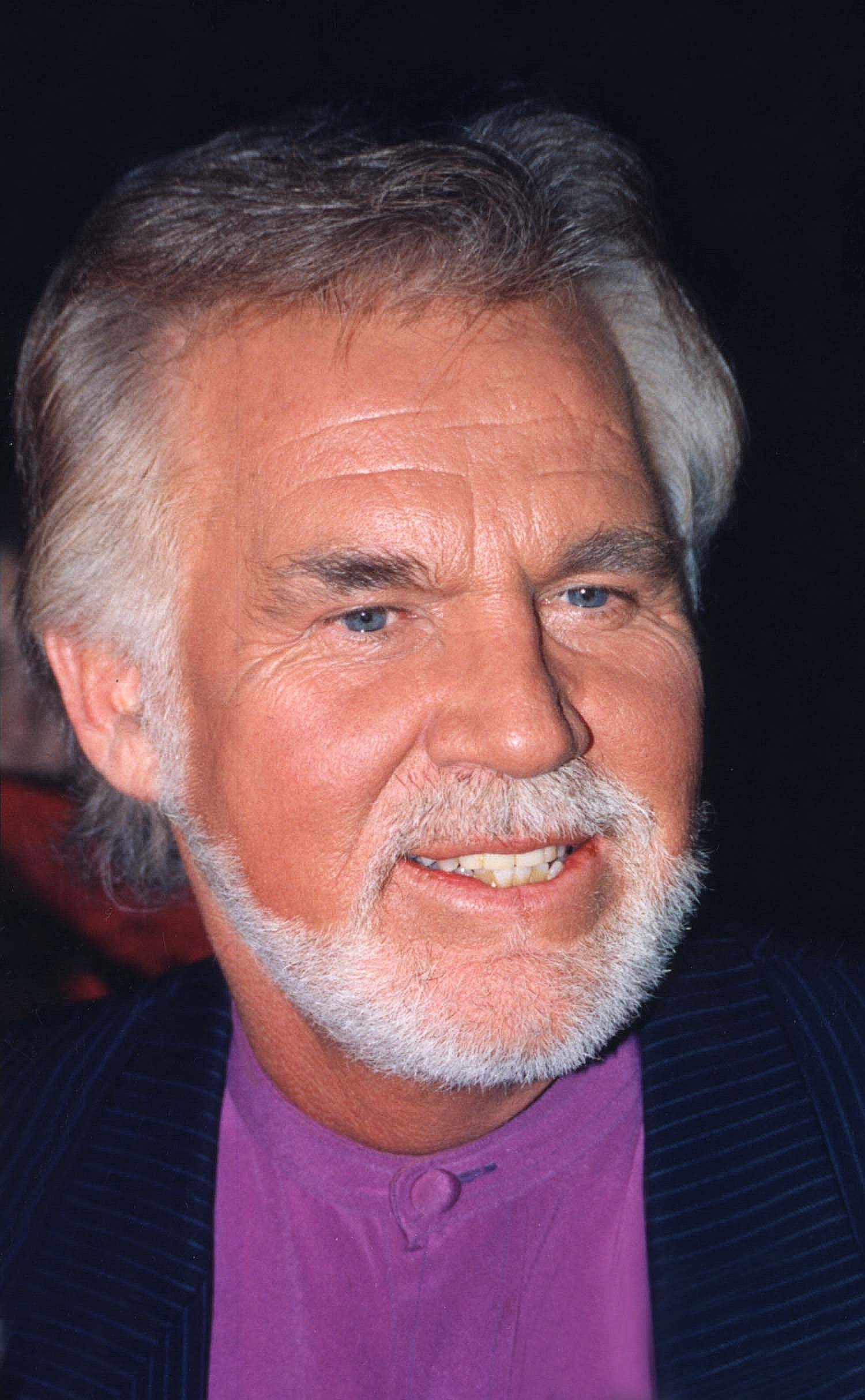
Kenny Rogers finished the year at number one.

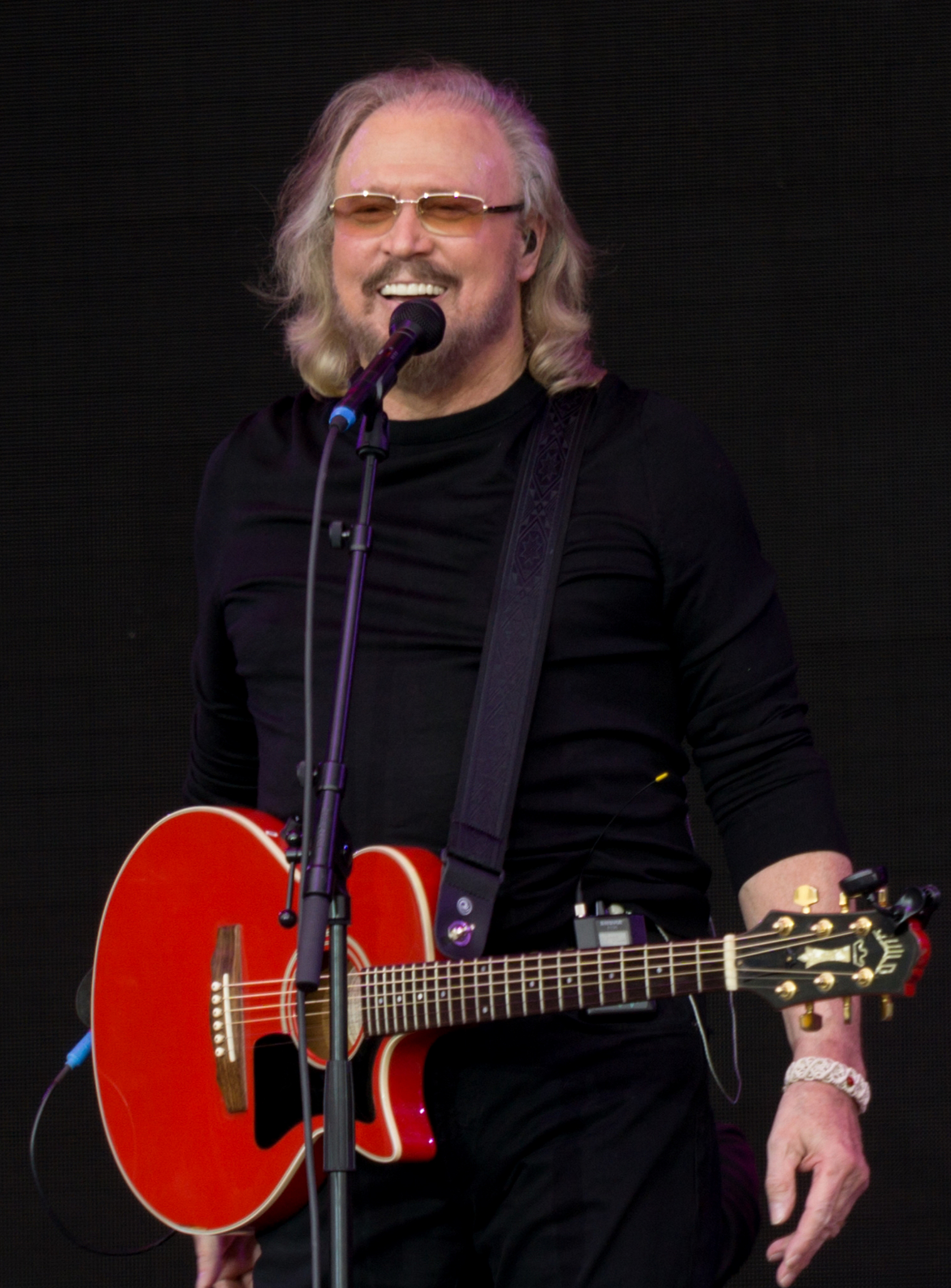
Barry Gibb of the pop group the Bee Gees co-wrote all the tracks on Rogers' album Eyes That See in the Dark and was also involved in its production, bringing a strong pop influence to the singer's sound.

| Issue date | Title | Artist(s) | Ref. |
|---|---|---|---|
| January 1 | Mountain Music | Alabama | |
| January 8 | Mountain Music | Alabama | |
| January 15 | Mountain Music | Alabama | |
| January 22 | Mountain Music | Alabama | |
| January 29 | Mountain Music | Alabama | |
| February 5 | Mountain Music | Alabama | |
| February 12 | Mountain Music | Alabama | |
| February 19 | Mountain Music | Alabama | |
| February 26 | Mountain Music | Alabama | |
| March 5 | Mountain Music | Alabama | |
| March 12 | Mountain Music | Alabama | |
| March 19 | Mountain Music | Alabama | |
| March 26 | Mountain Music | Alabama | |
| April 2 | Mountain Music | Alabama | |
| April 9 | Pancho & Lefty | Merle Haggard and Willie Nelson | |
| April 16 | The Closer You Get... | Alabama | |
| April 23 | The Closer You Get... | Alabama | |
| April 30 | The Closer You Get... | Alabama | |
| May 7 | The Closer You Get... | Alabama | |
| May 14 | The Closer You Get... | Alabama | |
| May 21 | The Closer You Get... | Alabama | |
| May 28 | The Closer You Get... | Alabama | |
| June 4 | The Closer You Get... | Alabama | |
| June 11 | The Closer You Get... | Alabama | |
| June 18 | The Closer You Get... | Alabama | |
| June 25 | The Closer You Get... | Alabama | |
| July 2 | The Closer You Get... | Alabama | |
| July 9 | Pancho & Lefty | Merle Haggard and Willie Nelson | |
| July 16 | The Closer You Get... | Alabama | |
| July 23 | Pancho & Lefty | Merle Haggard and Willie Nelson | |
| July 30 | Pancho & Lefty | Merle Haggard and Willie Nelson | |
| August 6 | The Closer You Get... | Alabama | |
| August 13 | The Closer You Get... | Alabama | |
| August 20 | The Closer You Get... | Alabama | |
| August 27 | The Closer You Get... | Alabama | |
| September 3 | Pancho & Lefty | Merle Haggard and Willie Nelson | |
| September 10 | Pancho & Lefty | Merle Haggard and Willie Nelson | |
| September 17 | Pancho & Lefty | Merle Haggard and Willie Nelson | |
| September 24 | The Closer You Get... | Alabama | |
| October 1 | Pancho & Lefty | Merle Haggard and Willie Nelson | |
| October 8 | The Closer You Get... | Alabama | |
| October 15 | The Closer You Get... | Alabama | |
| October 22 | The Closer You Get... | Alabama | |
| October 29 | Eyes That See in the Dark | Kenny Rogers | |
| November 5 | Eyes That See in the Dark | Kenny Rogers | |
| November 12 | Eyes That See in the Dark | Kenny Rogers | |
| November 19 | Eyes That See in the Dark | Kenny Rogers | |
| November 26 | Eyes That See in the Dark | Kenny Rogers | |
| December 3 | Eyes That See in the Dark | Kenny Rogers | |
| December 10 | Eyes That See in the Dark | Kenny Rogers | |
| December 17 | Eyes That See in the Dark | Kenny Rogers | |
| December 24 | Eyes That See in the Dark | Kenny Rogers | |
| December 31 | Eyes That See in the Dark | Kenny Rogers | |
