= List of Top Country LP's number ones of 1979 =

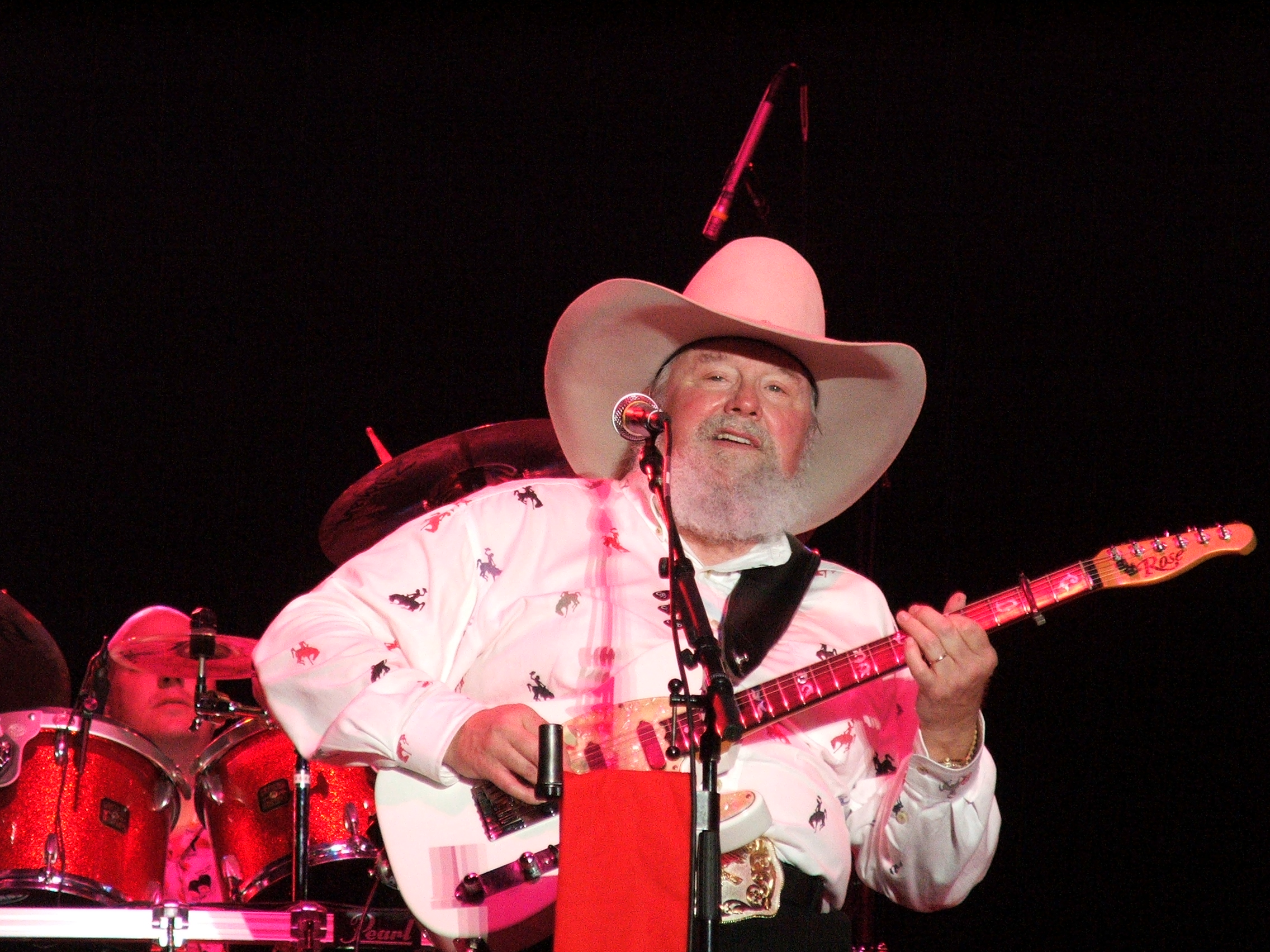
Million Mile Reflections was a number one for the Charlie Daniels Band.

Top Country Albums is a chart that ranks the top-performing country music albums in the United States, published by Billboard. In 1979, five different albums topped the chart, which was at the time published under the title Top Country LP's, based on sales reports submitted by a representative sample of stores nationwide.

In the issue of Billboard dated January 6, Willie Nelson reached number one with the live recording Willie and Family Live, which replaced the final chart-topper of 1978, I've Always Been Crazy by Waylon Jennings. After two weeks Nelson's album was displaced from the top of the chart by The Gambler by Kenny Rogers, who would go on to dominate the number one position during 1979. After spending 23 non-consecutive weeks in the top spot with The Gambler, Rogers would spend a further eight weeks atop the listing with Kenny, which reached the peak position in the issue of Billboard dated November 10 and would remain there for the remainder of the year and well into 1980. Rogers was at the peak of his career at the time, with the smooth production of his records appealing to both country and pop audiences. Between 1978 and 1980 he reached number one on the Hot Country Singles chart with five consecutive releases, including the title track from the album The Gambler.

Waylon Jennings spent fifteen non-consecutive weeks at number one beginning in June with his album Greatest Hits. Jennings was one of the mainstays of the outlaw country movement, which rejected the slick production values evident in popular country music of the early 1970s and added a rock music influence and a counterculture attitude. The compilation was his biggest-selling album, and was ultimately certified quintuple-platinum by the Recording Industry Association of America. The album's time at number one was twice interrupted by Million Mile Reflections, the first number one for the Charlie Daniels Band, which featured the group's chart-topping single "The Devil Went Down to Georgia". Although Daniels would remain a popular concert attraction for decades, he would not achieve any further number ones on either chart.

== Chart history ==
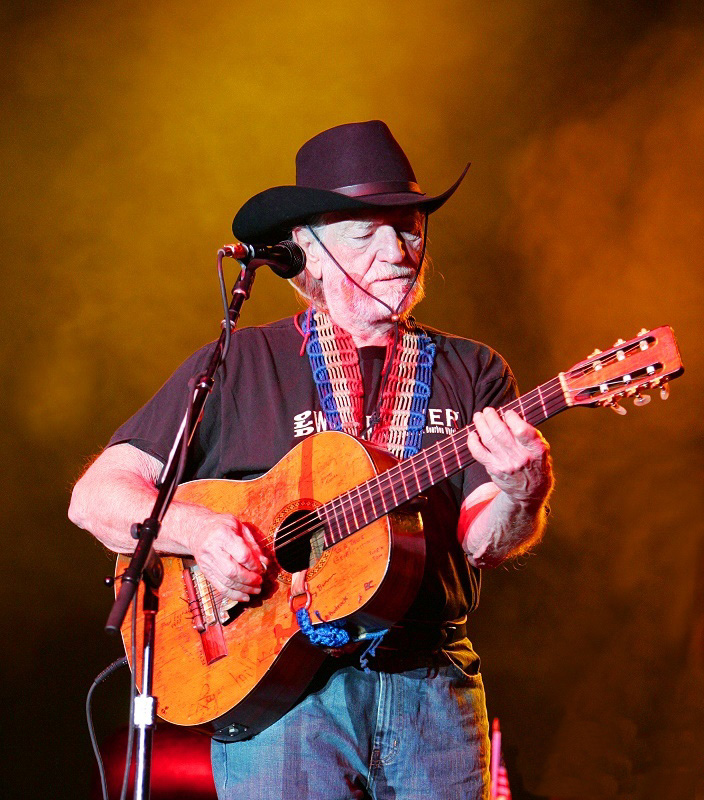
Willie Nelson topped the chart for the first two weeks of the year with the live recording Willie and Family Live.

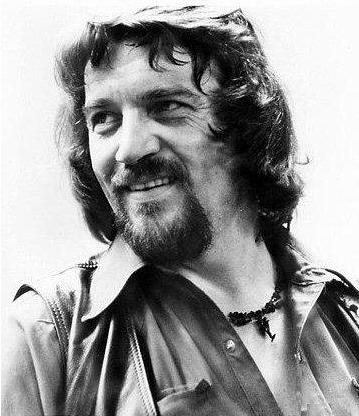
Waylon Jennings reached number one with the compilation album Greatest Hits.

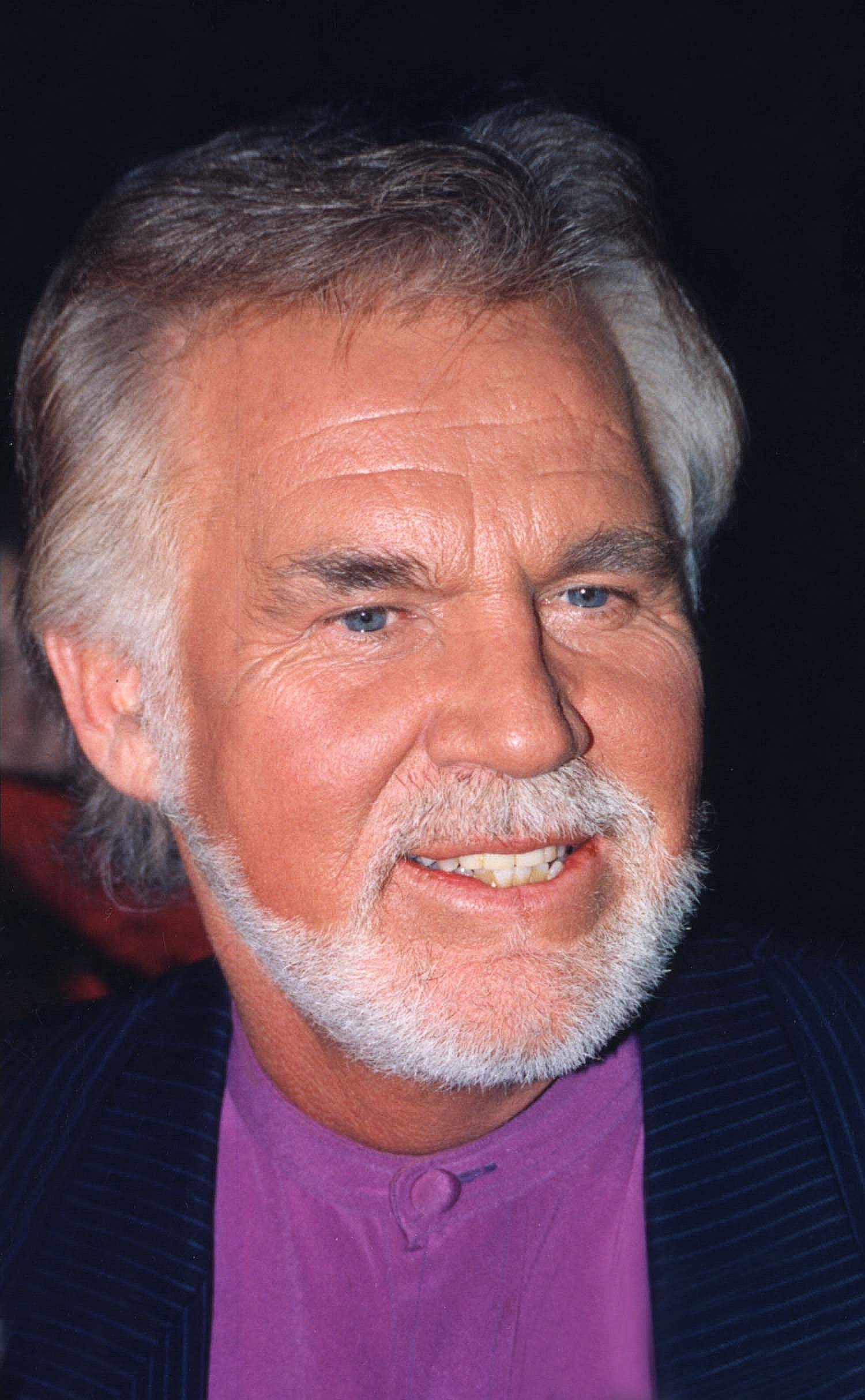
Kenny Rogers spent more than half of 1979 at number one.

Issue date	Title	Artist(s)	Ref.
January 6	Willie and Family Live	Willie Nelson	
January 13	Willie and Family Live	Willie Nelson	
January 20	The Gambler	Kenny Rogers	
January 27	The Gambler	Kenny Rogers	
February 3	The Gambler	Kenny Rogers	
February 10	The Gambler	Kenny Rogers	
February 17	The Gambler	Kenny Rogers	
February 24	The Gambler	Kenny Rogers	
March 3	The Gambler	Kenny Rogers	
March 10	The Gambler	Kenny Rogers	
March 17	The Gambler	Kenny Rogers	
March 24	The Gambler	Kenny Rogers	
March 31	The Gambler	Kenny Rogers	
April 7	The Gambler	Kenny Rogers	
April 14	The Gambler	Kenny Rogers	
April 21	The Gambler	Kenny Rogers	
April 28	The Gambler	Kenny Rogers	
May 5	The Gambler	Kenny Rogers	
May 12	The Gambler	Kenny Rogers	
May 19	The Gambler	Kenny Rogers	
May 26	The Gambler	Kenny Rogers	
June 2	Greatest Hits	Waylon Jennings	
June 9	The Gambler	Kenny Rogers	
June 16	The Gambler	Kenny Rogers	
June 23	The Gambler	Kenny Rogers	
June 30	The Gambler	Kenny Rogers	
July 7	Greatest Hits	Waylon Jennings	
July 14	Greatest Hits	Waylon Jennings	
July 21	Greatest Hits	Waylon Jennings	
July 28	Greatest Hits	Waylon Jennings	
August 4	Greatest Hits	Waylon Jennings	
August 11	Greatest Hits	Waylon Jennings	
August 18	Greatest Hits	Waylon Jennings	
August 25	Greatest Hits	Waylon Jennings	
September 1	Million Mile Reflections	Charlie Daniels Band	
September 8	Greatest Hits	Waylon Jennings	
September 15	Greatest Hits	Waylon Jennings	
September 22	Million Mile Reflections	Charlie Daniels Band	
September 29	Million Mile Reflections	Charlie Daniels Band	
October 6	Million Mile Reflections	Charlie Daniels Band	
October 13	Greatest Hits	Waylon Jennings	
October 20	Greatest Hits	Waylon Jennings	
October 27	Greatest Hits	Waylon Jennings	
November 3	Greatest Hits	Waylon Jennings	
November 10	Kenny	Kenny Rogers	
November 17	Kenny	Kenny Rogers	
November 24	Kenny	Kenny Rogers	
December 1	Kenny	Kenny Rogers	
December 8	Kenny	Kenny Rogers	
December 15	Kenny	Kenny Rogers	
December 22	Kenny	Kenny Rogers	
December 29	Kenny	Kenny Rogers	
