= List of Top Country LP's number ones of 1978 =

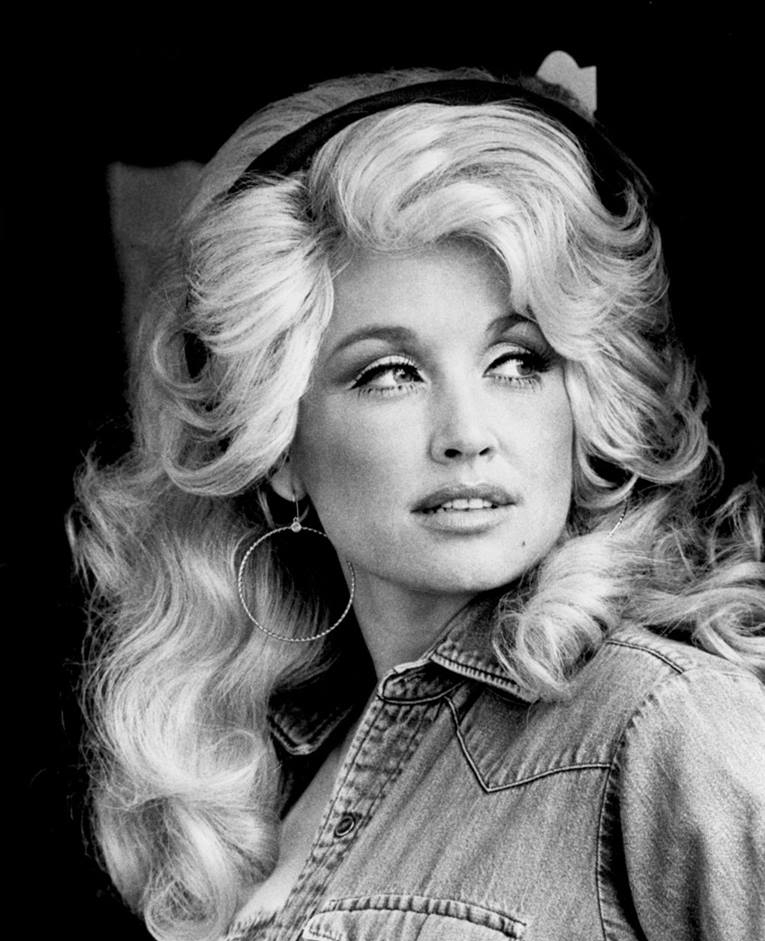
Dolly Parton had two chart-topping albums in 1978.

Top Country Albums is a chart that ranks the top-performing country music albums in the United States, published by Billboard. In 1978, eight different albums topped the chart, which was at the time published under the title Top Country LP's, based on sales reports submitted by a representative sample of stores nationwide.

In the issue of Billboard dated January 7, Dolly Parton was at number one with her album Here You Come Again, its third week in the top spot. The album remained at number one through the issue dated February 18 for a final total of nine weeks atop the chart. Parton would return to the top of the listing in September with Heartbreaker, which also spent nine consecutive weeks at number one. At the time, Parton's music was increasingly being targeted at the pop music market; Heartbreaker in particular was more pop-focused than her previous recordings and two of its tracks even received disco remixes which were popular in nightclubs. Dottie West was the only other female artist to reach number one during the year, when she collaborated with Kenny Rogers on Every Time Two Fools Collide, which topped the listing in May. West had first entered the country albums chart in 1965 but had never previously reached number one, and indeed had not entered the top ten for over a decade, but her collaboration with the popular Rogers gave her her first chart-topping album as well as her first number one on the country singles chart.

In March, Waylon Jennings and Willie Nelson topped the chart with their collaborative album Waylon & Willie, which spent 11 non-consecutive weeks at number one. The two artists were among the most prominent members of the outlaw country movement, which rejected the slick production values evident in popular country music of the early 1970s and added a rock music influence and a counterculture attitude. Both singers also had solo number ones during the year. In June, Nelson displaced the joint album from the top spot with his solo release Stardust. The album was an unexpected departure for Nelson, as it consisted entirely of pop standards and incorporated pop and jazz styles, in contrast to his outlaw country recordings. Executives at his record label were convinced that making the album was a bad decision on the part of Nelson, but it went on to become a multi-million seller and remain on the country albums chart for more than ten years. It would ultimately be certified quintuple platinum by the Recording Industry Association of America. Nelson's fellow outlaw artist Jennings had the final chart-topper of 1978 with I've Always Been Crazy, which spent the last eight weeks of the year at number one.

== Chart history ==
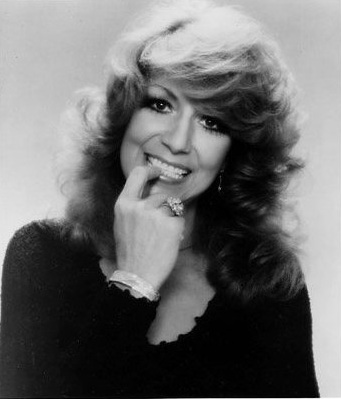
Dottie West collaborated with Kenny Rogers on the album Every Time Two Fools Collide.

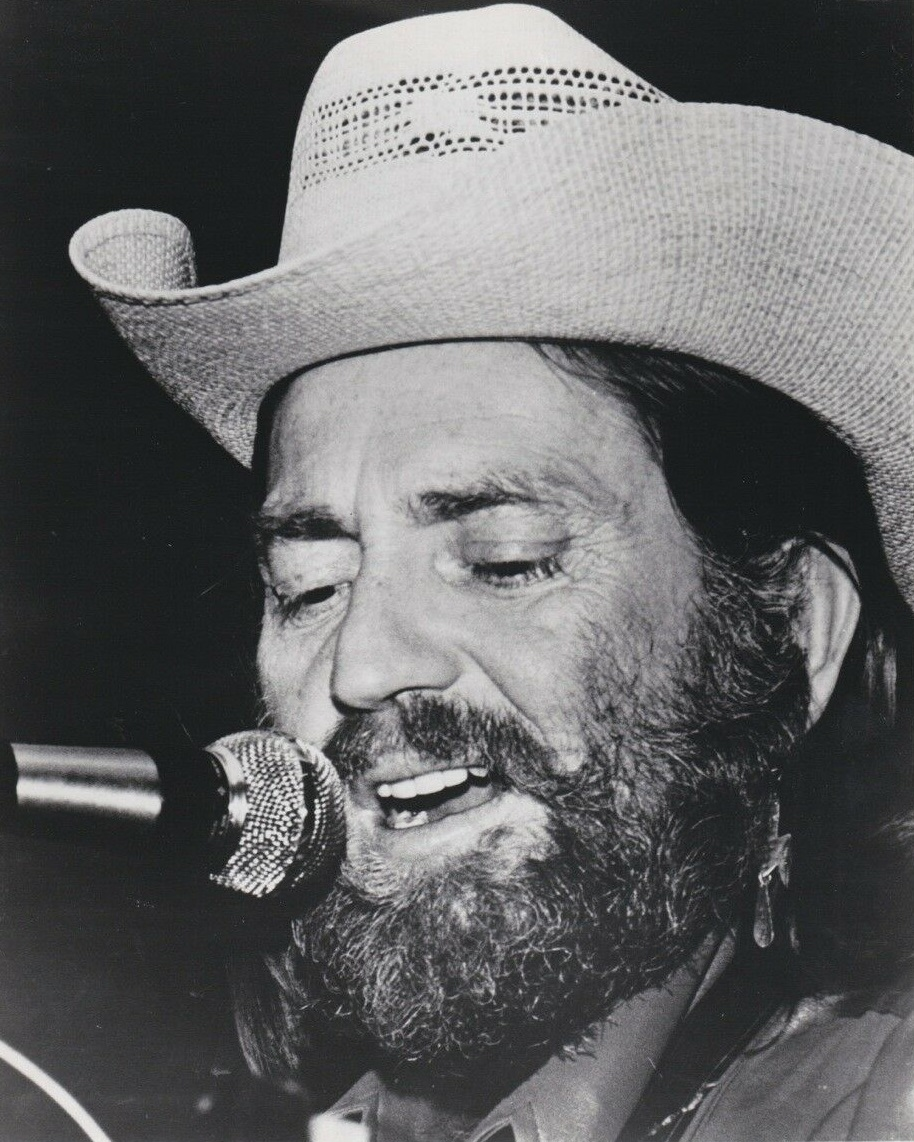
Willie Nelson topped the chart with the album Stardust. Although atypical of his usual style, it was a huge success and remained on the chart for more than ten years.

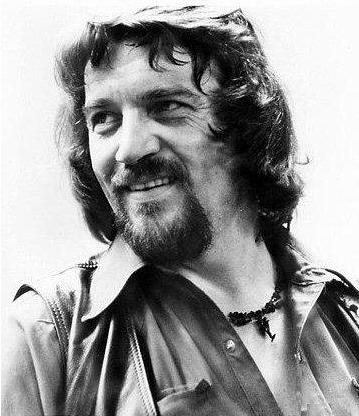
Waylon Jennings collaborated with Nelson on the album Waylon & Willie, which spent 11 weeks at number one, and also topped the chart with his solo album I've Always Been Crazy.

| Issue date | Title | Artist(s) | Ref. |
|---|---|---|---|
| January 7 | Here You Come Again | Dolly Parton | |
| January 14 | Here You Come Again | Dolly Parton | |
| January 21 | Here You Come Again | Dolly Parton | |
| January 28 | Here You Come Again | Dolly Parton | |
| February 4 | Here You Come Again | Dolly Parton | |
| February 11 | Here You Come Again | Dolly Parton | |
| February 18 | Here You Come Again | Dolly Parton | |
| February 25 | Waylon & Willie | Waylon Jennings and Willie Nelson | |
| March 4 | Waylon & Willie | Waylon Jennings and Willie Nelson | |
| March 11 | Waylon & Willie | Waylon Jennings and Willie Nelson | |
| March 18 | Waylon & Willie | Waylon Jennings and Willie Nelson | |
| March 25 | Waylon & Willie | Waylon Jennings and Willie Nelson | |
| April 1 | Waylon & Willie | Waylon Jennings and Willie Nelson | |
| April 8 | Waylon & Willie | Waylon Jennings and Willie Nelson | |
| April 15 | Ten Years of Gold | Kenny Rogers | |
| April 22 | Ten Years of Gold | Kenny Rogers | |
| April 29 | Waylon & Willie | Waylon Jennings and Willie Nelson | |
| May 6 | Waylon & Willie | Waylon Jennings and Willie Nelson | |
| May 13 | Waylon & Willie | Waylon Jennings and Willie Nelson | |
| May 20 | Every Time Two Fools Collide | Kenny Rogers and Dottie West | |
| May 27 | Every Time Two Fools Collide | Kenny Rogers and Dottie West | |
| June 3 | Waylon & Willie | Waylon Jennings and Willie Nelson | |
| June 10 | Stardust | Willie Nelson | |
| June 17 | Stardust | Willie Nelson | |
| June 24 | Stardust | Willie Nelson | |
| July 1 | Stardust | Willie Nelson | |
| July 8 | Stardust | Willie Nelson | |
| July 15 | Stardust | Willie Nelson | |
| July 22 | Stardust | Willie Nelson | |
| July 29 | Stardust | Willie Nelson | |
| August 5 | Stardust | Willie Nelson | |
| August 12 | Stardust | Willie Nelson | |
| August 19 | Stardust | Willie Nelson | |
| August 26 | Love or Something Like It | Kenny Rogers | |
| September 2 | Love or Something Like It | Kenny Rogers | |
| September 9 | Heartbreaker | Dolly Parton | |
| September 16 | Heartbreaker | Dolly Parton | |
| September 23 | Heartbreaker | Dolly Parton | |
| September 30 | Heartbreaker | Dolly Parton | |
| October 7 | Heartbreaker | Dolly Parton | |
| October 14 | Heartbreaker | Dolly Parton | |
| October 21 | Heartbreaker | Dolly Parton | |
| October 28 | Heartbreaker | Dolly Parton | |
| November 4 | Heartbreaker | Dolly Parton | |
| November 11 | I've Always Been Crazy | Waylon Jennings | |
| November 18 | I've Always Been Crazy | Waylon Jennings | |
| November 25 | I've Always Been Crazy | Waylon Jennings | |
| December 2 | I've Always Been Crazy | Waylon Jennings | |
| December 9 | I've Always Been Crazy | Waylon Jennings | |
| December 16 | I've Always Been Crazy | Waylon Jennings | |
| December 23 | I've Always Been Crazy | Waylon Jennings | |
| December 30 | I've Always Been Crazy | Waylon Jennings | |
