= Deborah Allen discography =

- Studio albums: 12
- Extended plays: 1
- Compilation albums: 1
- Singles: 23
- Music videos: 9

This article documents the discography for American country music artist Deborah Allen.

== Studio albums ==
Title	Album details	Peak chart positions
Title	Album details	US Country
Trouble in Paradise	Release date: July 1980; Label: Capitol Records; Formats: Vinyl	—
Let Me Be the First	Release date: December 1984; Label: RCA Records; Formats: CD, Vinyl, Cassette	52
Telepathy	Release date: 1987; Label: RCA Records; Formats: Vinyl, Cassette	—
Delta Dreamland	Release date: February 1993; Label: Giant Nashville; Formats: CD, Cassette	55
All That I Am	Release date: July 1994; Label: Giant Nashville; Formats: CD, Cassette	—
The Best of Deborah Allen	Release date: August 29, 2000; Label: Curb Records; Formats: CD	—
Hands On	Release date: October 2000; Re-release date: 2003; Label: Southbound Records; Formats: CD	—
Deb in the Raw	Release date: October 2000; Label: Southbound Records; Formats: CD	—
Memphis Princess	Release date: April 18, 2006; Label: Renaissance Records; Formats: CD	—
Hear Me Now	Release date: August 16, 2011; Label: Delta Rock Records/GMV Nashville; Formats: CD, Music Download	—
Rockin’ Little Christmas	Release date: November 2013; Label: Weblast Records; Formats: CD, Music Download	—
The Art Of Dreaming	Release date: March 18, 2022; Label: BFD Audium Nashville; Formats: CD, Music Download	—
"—" denotes releases that did not chart

== Compilation albums ==
Title	Album details
Anthology	Release date: October 13, 1998; Label: Renaissance Records; Formats: CD

== Mini LP ==
Title	Album details	Peak chart positions	
Title	Album details	US Country	US
Cheat the Night	Release date: September 1983; Label: RCA Records; Formats: Vinyl, Cassette	10	67

== Singles ==
Year	Title	Peak chart positions				Album
Year	Title	US Country	US	US AC	CAN Country	Album
1976	"Do You Copy"	—	—	—	—	Non-album single
1979	"Don't Let Me Cross Over" (with Jim Reeves)	10	—	—	—	Don't Let Me Cross Over
1979	"Oh, How I Miss You Tonight" (with Jim Reeves)	6	—	—	40	Don't Let Me Cross Over
1980	"Take Me in Your Arms and Hold Me" (with Jim Reeves)	10	—	—	—	Don't Let Me Cross Over
1980	"You Never Cross My Mind"	—	—	—	—	Trouble in Paradise
1980	"Nobody's Fool"	24	—	—	—	Trouble in Paradise
1981	"You (Make Me Wonder Why)"	20	—	—	—	Non-album single
1982	"You Look Like the One I Love"	33	—	—	—	Non-album single
1982	"After Tonight"	82	—	—	—	Non-album single
1982	"Let's Stop Talkin' About It"	—	—	—	—	Non-album single
1983	"Baby I Lied"	4	26	10	—	Cheat the Night
1984	"I've Been Wrong Before"	2	—	—	1	Cheat the Night
1984	"I Hurt for You"	10	—	—	17	Cheat the Night
1984	"Heartache and a Half"	23	—	—	25	Let Me Be the First
1987	"Telepathy"	—	—	—	—	Telepathy
1987	"You're the Kind of Trouble"	—	—	—	—	Telepathy
1992	"Rock Me (In the Cradle of Love)"	29	—	—	50	Delta Dreamland
1993	"If You're Not Gonna Love Me"	44	—	—	61	Delta Dreamland
1993	"All the Loving and Hurting Too"	—	—	—	—	Delta Dreamland
1994	"Break These Chains"	66	—	—	—	All That I Am
1994	"Wrong Side of Love"	—	—	—	—	All That I Am
1999	"Is It Love Yet"	—	—	—	—	The Best of Deborah Allen
2006	"God Bless the Children" (with Wayne Warner and the Nashville All-Star Choir)	—	—	—	—	Turbo Twang'n
2009	"There's a Last Time for Everything"	—	—	—	—	Hear Me Now
2010	"Amazing Graceland"	—	—	—	—	Hear Me Now
2011	"Anything Other Than Love"	—	—	—	—	Hear Me Now
2022	"Blue Collar Baby"	—	—	—	—	
"—" denotes releases that did not chart

=== Christmas singles ===
Year	Title	Album
1984	"Rockin' Little Christmas"	A Country Christmas, Volume 3
2010	"Redneck Christmas" (with Cledus T. Judd)	Non-album single

== Music videos ==
Year	Title	Director(s)
1984	"Rockin' Little Christmas"	Ron Jacobs
1987	"Telepathy"	Deborah Allen/Rafe Van Hoy
1992	"Rock Me (In The Cradle Of Love)"	
1993	"If You're Not Gonna Love Me"	
1994	"Break These Chains"	John Lloyd Miller
1994	"Wrong Side Of Love"	
2005	"Destiny's Song" (with Anita Cochran and Tammy Cochran)	
2006	"Tell Someone About It	
2006	"I Love You"	
2012	"It Better Be Big"	
2022	"Moody Bluesy Christmas"	
2023	"All Or Nothing At All"	
