= God Bless America (disambiguation) =

"God Bless America" is a patriotic song written by Irving Berlin.

God Bless America may also refer to:

- God Bless America (LeAnn Rimes album), 2001
- God Bless America (charity album), a 2001 compilation album of patriotic songs by Columbia Records artists
- God Bless America (film), a 2011 dark comedy film by Bobcat Goldthwait
- God Bless America – and All the Beautiful Women in It (Lana Del Rey song), a 2017 song by Lana Del Rey from her studio album Lust for Life
- "God Bless America" (Orange Is the New Black), a 2019 television episode

== See also ==
- "God Bless Amerika", a 2013 song by Lil Wayne
- "God Bless the U.S.A.", a 1984 song by Lee Greenwood
