= Hurt Me =

Hurt Me may refer to:

- Suffering or pain
- Hurt Me (album), a 1984 album by Johnny Thunders
- "Hurt Me" (Låpsley song), 2015
- Hurt Me (Deborah Allen song), 1994
- "Hurt Me", a song by Leann Rimes from the 1996 album, Blue
