= List of awards and nominations received by LeAnn Rimes =

LeAnn Rimes awards and nominations
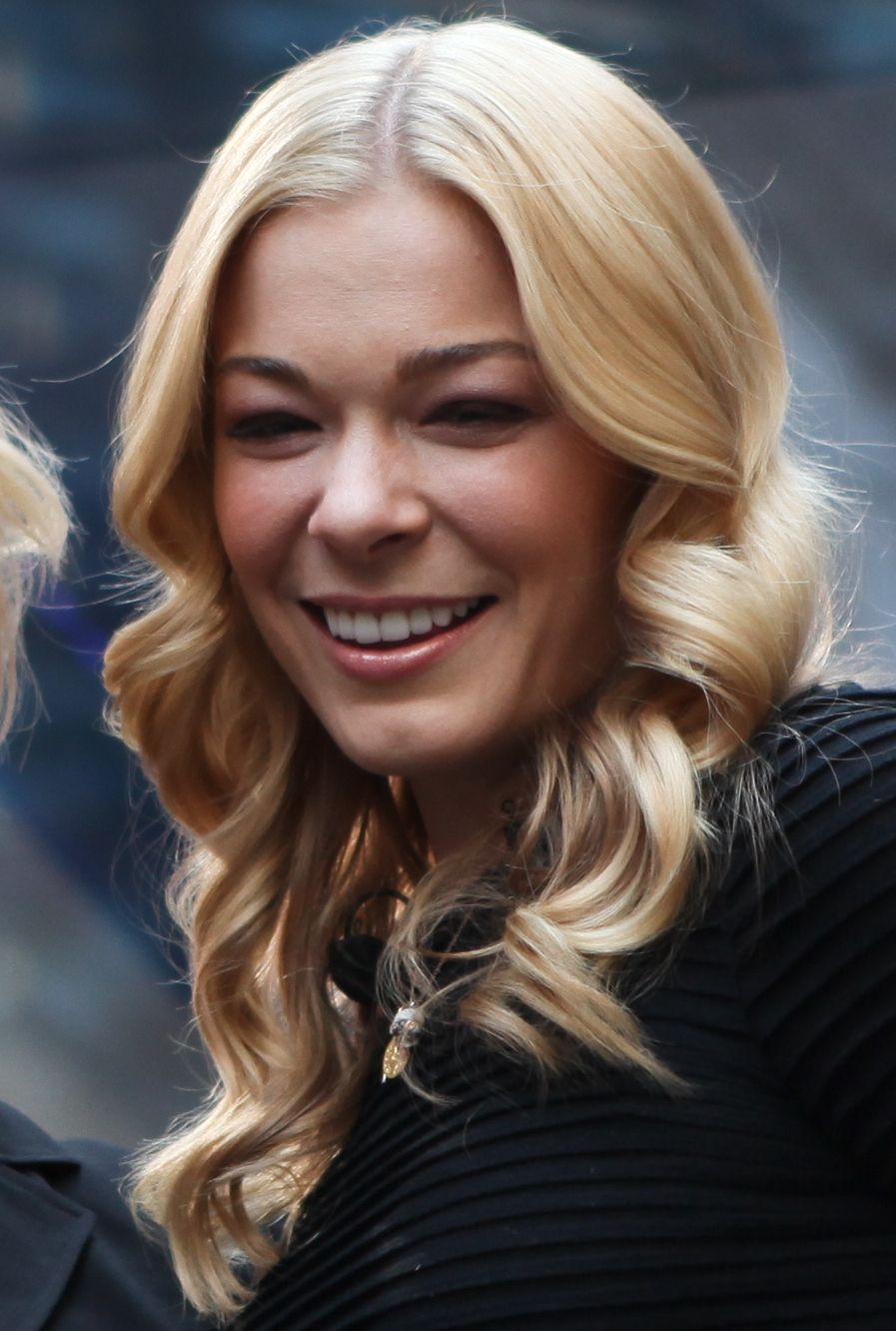
- Rimes in 2009
Awards and nominations
Award	Wins	Nominations
Academy of Country Music Awards	3	7
Country Music Association Awards	1	4
Grammy Awards	2	5

Totals (Note: Certain award groups do not simply award one winner. They acknowledge several different recipients, have runners-up, and have third place. Since this is a specific recognition and is different from losing an award, runner-up mentions are considered wins in this award tally. For simplification and to avoid errors, each award in this list has been presumed to have had a prior nomination.)
- Wins: 17
- Nominations: 38

American singer LeAnn Rimes has won seventeen awards and has received thirty eight nominations. She won her first set of awards in 1996 at the Academy of Country Music Awards for her debut single "Blue". In 2008, she won the Humanitarian Award from the ACM organization. In 1997, she won several more accolades for similar from the Country Music Association and the American Music Awards. She also received nominations from several award programs for her recording of "How Do I Live". The same year, Rimes won two accolades from the Grammy Awards including the award for Best New Artist. She has also received five nominations from the Grammys. She has since won awards from the CMT Music Awards and the GMA Dove Awards.

== Academy of Country Music Awards ==
Year	Nominee / work	Award	Result	Ref.
1996	Blue	Album of the Year	Nominated	
1996	"Blue"	Single Record of the Year	Won	
1996	"Blue"	Song of the Year	Won	
1996	LeAnn Rimes	Top New Female Vocalist	Won	
1997	"How Do I Live"	Single Record of the Year	Nominated	
1997	"How Do I Live"	Song of the Year	Nominated	
1997	LeAnn Rimes	Top Female Vocalist	Nominated	
2007	LeAnn Rimes	Top Female Vocalist	Nominated	
2007	"Till We Ain't Strangers Anymore" (with Bon Jovi)	Vocal Event of the Year	Nominated	
2008	LeAnn Rimes	The Home Depot Humanitarian Award	Won	

== American Music Awards ==
Year	Nominee / work	Award	Result	Ref.
1997	LeAnn Rimes	Favorite New Country Artist	Won	
1998	LeAnn Rimes	Favorite Country Female Artist	Nominated	
1998	Unchained Melody: The Early Years	Favorite Country Album	Nominated	
1999	LeAnn Rimes	Favorite Country Female Artist	Nominated	
2002	LeAnn Rimes	Favorite Adult Contemporary Artist	Nominated	
2005	LeAnn Rimes	Favorite Country Female Artist	Nominated	

== Billboard Music Awards ==
Year	Nominee / work	Award	Result	Ref.
1997	LeAnn Rimes	Artist of the Year	Won	
1997	LeAnn Rimes	Country Artist of the Year	Won	
1997	LeAnn Rimes	Country Singles Artist of the Year	Won	
1997	Blue	Country Album of the Year	Won	

== CMT Music Awards ==
Year	Nominee / work	Award	Result	Ref.
1997	LeAnn Rimes	Female Star of Tomorrow	Won	
2002	"Life Goes On"	Hottest Female Video	Nominated	
2008	"Till We Ain't Strangers Anymore" (with Bon Jovi)	Collaborative Video of the Year	Won	

== Country Music Association Awards ==
Year	Nominee / work	Award	Result	Ref.
1996	LeAnn Rimes	Horizon Award	Nominated	
1996	"Blue"	Single Record of the Year	Nominated	
1997	LeAnn Rimes	Horizon Award	Won	
1997	LeAnn Rimes	Female Vocalist of the Year	Nominated	
1997	Blue	Album of the Year	Nominated	

== GMA Dove Awards ==
Year	Nominee / work	Award	Result	Ref.
2008	"Ready for a Miracle"	Traditional Gospel Recorded Song of the Year	Won	

== Grammy Awards ==
Year	Nominee / work	Award	Result	Ref.
1997	LeAnn Rimes	Best New Artist	Won	
1997	"Blue"	Best Female Country Vocal Performance	Won	
1998	"How Do I Live"	Best Female Country Vocal Performance	Nominated	
2007	"Something's Gotta Give"	Best Female Country Vocal Performance	Nominated	
2008	"Nothin' Better To Do"	Best Female Country Vocal Performance	Nominated	
2009	"What I Cannot Change"	Best Female Country Vocal Performance	Nominated	
2011	"Swingin'"	Best Female Country Vocal Performance	Nominated	

== World Music Awards ==
Year	Nominee / work	Award	Result	Ref.
1998	Herself	World's Best Selling American Artist	Won	
1998	Herself	World's Best Selling Country Artist	Won	
