= Rock Me in the Cradle of Love =

Rock Me in the Cradle of Love may refer to:

- "Rock Me in the Cradle of Love", a song by Dee Dee Sharp
- "Rock Me (In the Cradle of Love)", a song by Deborah Allen from the album Delta Dreamland
