= Lipstick on Your Collar =

Lipstick on Your Collar may refer to:

- "Lipstick on Your Collar" (song), 1959 song by Connie Francis
- Lipstick on Your Collar (TV series), a 1993 British TV series
