= Telepathy (disambiguation) =

Telepathy is the purported transmission of information between people without using known sensory channels or physical interaction.

Telepathy may also refer to:

- Telepathy (software), a software framework
  - KDE Telepathy, a front-end for Telepathy
- Telepathy (Cindy Blackman album), 1992
- Telepathy, an album by Deborah Allen, 1987
- Telepathy (He Xuntian), a 1987 work for symphony orchestra composed by He Xuntian

== Songs ==
- "Telepathy" (song), by Christina Aguilera from the soundtrack of The Get Down, 2016
- "Telepathy", by BTS from Be, 2020
- "Telepathy", by Eddy Grant from Going for Broke, 1984
- "Telepathy", by Lene Lovich from Stateless, 1978
- "Telepathy", by Men Without Hats from No Hats Beyond This Point, 2003
- "Telepathy", by Swans from The Great Annihilator, 1995

== See also ==
- Telepathe, an American electronic music duo
- "Telepatía", a 2020 song by Kali Uchis
- Teleparty, a 2025 single album by BSS
