= Rock Me =

Rock Me may refer to:

== Albums ==
- Rock Me (Great White album), a 1997 compilation album, or the 1987 title song (see below)
  - Rock Me: The Best of Great White, a 2006 compilation album
- Rock Me (Platnum album), 2005, or the title song
- Rock Me, a Japanese-language album by Hound Dog (band)

== Fashion ==
- Rock Me! a 2009 fragrance by fashion designer Anna Sui

== Songs ==
- "Rock Me" (Rosetta Tharpe song), 1938
- "Rock Me" (Steppenwolf song), 1969
- "Rock Me" (ABBA song), 1976
- "Rock Me" (Great White song), 1987
- "Rock Me" (Riva song), 1989
- "Rock Me" (Melanie C song), 2011
- "Rock Me" (One Direction song), 2012
- "Rock Me", a song by Muddy Waters based on the same song as B.B. King's "Rock Me Baby"
- "Rock Me (In the Cradle of Love)", a song by Deborah Allen from Delta Dreamland
