= God Bless America (LeAnn Rimes album) =

Compilation album by LeAnn Rimes
- Released: October 16, 2001
- Recorded: 1994–1997
- Studio: Rosewood Studio (Tyler, Texas); McLain Studios (Dallas, Texas); Starstruck Studios (Nashville, Tennessee); KD Studios (Nashville, Tennessee); Curb Studios (Nashville, Tennessee); Norman Petty Studios (Clovis, New Mexico)
- Genre: Country; contemporary Christian
- Length: 32:31
- Label: Curb
- Producer: Wilbur C. Rimes; Roger Wojahn; Johnny Mulhair; Mike Curb

LeAnn Rimes chronology
I Need You (2001)	God Bless America (2001)	Twisted Angel (2002)

Singles from God Bless America
- 1. "God Bless America" Released: 2001

Professional ratings
Review scores
Source	Rating
Allmusic	3/5 stars
The Rolling Stone Album Guide	1/5 stars

God Bless America is the second compilation album from American recording artist LeAnn Rimes. The album was released on October 16, 2001 as a patriotic tribute to the events of September 11, 2001.

The album comprises patriotic and inspirational songs that were originally included on All That (1994) and You Light Up My Life: Inspirational Songs (1997), with the liner stating, "These classic recordings were made while America was first discovering LeAnn Rimes."

"Put a Little Holiday in Your Heart" was originally released as a bonus single alongside Blue at Target during the 1996 Christmas season. The album includes four previously unreleased recordings: "The Lord's Prayer" and "The Sands of Time", in addition to alternate recordings of the previously released songs "Why Can't We" and "Middle Man".

== Release ==
God Bless America was an unofficial release put out by Curb Records while Rimes was in the midst of a legal battle with the label in an effort to nullify the recording contract she entered into with them at 12 years old. Shortly after its release, Rimes ended her standoff with the label and signed a new contract with them.

== Track listing ==
No.	Title	Writer(s)	Length
1.	"God Bless America"	Irving Berlin	3:05
2.	"National Anthem" (Traditional)	Francis Scott Key	2:02
3.	"The Lord's Prayer" (Traditional)	Albert Hay Malotte	2:52
4.	"The Sands of Time"	Connie Faulk	2:50
5.	"Why Can't We"	Allen Shamblin; Austin Cunningham; Chuck Cannon	3:48
6.	"Put a Little Holiday in Your Heart"	Greg Wojahn; Roger Wojahn; Scott Wojahn	3:25
7.	"Middle Man"	David Patillo	4:28
8.	"I Believe"	Ervin Drake; Irvin Graham; Jimmy Shirl; Al Stillman	2:21
9.	"A Broken Wing"	David Nowlen	3:23
10.	"Amazing Grace" (Traditional)	John Newton	4:05
Total length:			32:31

== Charts ==
Chart (2001)	Peak position
US Billboard 200	159
US Top Country Albums (Billboard)	20

== Personnel ==
- Bob Campbell-Smith – additional recording, mixing
- Bob Gentry – bass guitar
- Curtis Randall – background vocals, bass guitar
- Dan Wojciechowski – drums
- Daniel Kresco – assistant mixing
- Dennis Willson – background vocals
- Gary Leach – assistant mixing, background vocals
- Glenn Meadows – master
- Greg Hunt – recording, mixing
- Greg Morrow – drums
- Jeff Watkins – assistant recording
- Jerry Matheny – electric guitar
- Jimmy Kelly – keyboards
- John Willis – electric guitar
- Johnny Mulhair – producer
- Kelly Glenn – keyboards
- LeAnn Rimes – lead vocals
- Lesley Albert – production coordinator
- Mary Ann Kennedy – background vocals
- Michael Black – background vocals
- Michael Rhodes – bass guitar
- Michael Spriggs – acoustic guitar
- Mike Curb – producer
- Mike McClain – recording, mixing
- Milo Deering – acoustic guitar, fiddle, steel guitar
- Pam Rose – background vocals
- Paul Franklin – steel guitar
- Roger Wojahn – producer
- Steve Nathan – keyboards
- Wilbur C. Rimes – producer
