= Plenty Good Lovin' =

Single by Connie Francis
- A-side: "Plenty Good Lovin'" "You're Gonna Miss Me"
- Released: 1959
- Genre: Pop
- Length: 2:05
- Label: MGM

Connie Francis US singles chronology
"Lipstick on Your Collar" / "Frankie" (1959)	"Plenty Good Lovin'" (1959)	"Among My Souvenirs" / "God Bless America" (1959)

Audio
- "Plenty Good Lovin'" on YouTube

"Plenty Good Lovin'" is a song written and originally recorded by Connie Francis, who released it as a single in 1959 on MGM Records.

== Release and critical reception ==
Professional ratings
Review scores
Source	Rating
Billboard	(favorable)

Billboard reviewed Connie Francis's single (MGM 12824, c/w "You're Gonna Miss Me") on August 17, 1959, praising both sides as "strong hits". The reviewer described "Pretty Good Lovin'" as "a ballad with beat that [Connie Francis] sings with feeling".

== Charts ==
Chart (1959)	Peak position
US Billboard Hot 100	69
US Cash Box Top 100 Singles	63
UK Singles (Official Charts)	18
