= Hurt Me (Deborah Allen song) =

1994 song by Deborah Allen

Song by Deborah Allen

from the album All That I Am
- Released: July 19, 1994
- Genre: Country pop
- Length: 2:57
- Label: Giant
- Songwriters: Deborah Allen; Rafe Van Hoy; Bobby Braddock
- Producers: James Stroud; Deborah Allen

"Hurt Me" is a song written and recorded by American country singer and songwriter Deborah Allen, who wrote the song alongside Rafe Van Hoy and Bobby Braddock. The song was first released on her fifth studio album All That I Am on July 19, 1994, by Giant Records. It would later be covered by American country singer LeAnn Rimes and released as a single from Rimes' debut album, Blue, on August 3, 1996, through Rimes' record label, Curb Records.

== Background ==
The song was written by Deborah Allen along with Rafe Van Hoy and Bobby Braddock. It was recorded by Allen for her fifth studio album, All That I Am (1994). The song was also produced by Allen alongside James Stroud.

== LeAnn Rimes version ==
"Hurt Me"

Single by LeAnn Rimes

from the album Blue
- B-side: "Cattle Call" (with Eddy Arnold)
- Released: August 3, 1996
- Genre: Country
- Length: 2:53
- Label: Curb
- Songwriters: Deborah Allen; Bobby Braddock; Rafe Van Hoy
- Producer: Wilbur C. Rimes

LeAnn Rimes singles chronology
"Blue" (1996)	"Hurt Me" (1996)	"One Way Ticket (Because I Can)" (1996)

On July 9, 1996, American country singer LeAnn Rimes would release a cover of the song on her debut album Blue through Curb Records before releasing the song as her second single from the album on August 3, 1996. Unlike Rimes' previous single, the song was not a huge hit, only peaking at number 43 on the Billboard Hot Country Songs chart. In Canada, the song peaked at 35 and 89 in Australia.

=== Critical response ===
Larry Flick of Billboard wrote a positive review about the song stating that "The song is great, and one of the best things about the record is that father Wilbur Rimes' production keeps the focal point on the song and LeAnn's incredible voice."

=== Track listing ===
Australian CD single

1. "Hurt Me" – 2:53
2. "Cattle Call" (with Eddy Arnold) – 3:07

US promo CD single

1. "Hurt Me" – 2:53

=== Charts ===
Chart performance for "Hurt Me" by LeAnn Rimes
Chart (1996)	Peak position
Australia (ARIA)	89
Canada Country Tracks (RPM)	35
US Hot Country Songs (Billboard)	43
