= All That (album) =

Studio album by LeAnn Rimes
- Released: July 22, 1994
- Recorded: April 29 – June 2, 1994
- Studio: Norman Petty Studios (Clovis, New Mexico)
- Genre: Country
- Length: 36:42
- Label: Nor Va Jak
- Producer: Greg Walker, Johnny Mulhair, Wilbur C. Rimes

LeAnn Rimes chronology
From My Heart to Yours (1992)	All That (1994)	Blue (1996)

All That is the second studio album by LeAnn Rimes, released independently under the label Nor Va Jak. It was released on July 22, 1994. The album sold 15,000 copies locally, and a copy was given to Curb Records owner, Mike Curb, who later signed Rimes to his label and released her debut major label album, Blue (1996). The album was later reissued as Unchained Melody: The Early Years (1997).

All That contains the original recording of "Blue". The album contains covers of Dolly Parton’s “Why Can't We” and “I Will Always Love You”, though the latter is done in the style of Whitney Houston’s R&B cover. The album also has a cover of The Beatles’ “Yesterday” and Patsy Montana’s “I Want to Be a Cowboy's Sweetheart”.

== Background ==
All That consists of songs that Rimes performed during her concerts prior to her contract with Curb Records. Rimes was eleven years old at the time she recorded the album. The album was recorded in the spring of 1994 at Norman Petty Studios in Clovis, New Mexico and was released in July of the same year. Rimes recorded the song "Blue" which Bill Mack had passed to her.

The album sold 15,000 copies in the Dallas-Fort Worth metroplex. A copy was sent to major record label owners, including Mike Curb who recalled: "Someone sent me her CD. I put it on and everyone just turned their heads and said, 'Who's that?'". Two years later Rimes signed her contract with Curb Records. Rimes re-recorded "Blue" and "I'll Get Even with You" on Blue (1996). Due to high sales of Blue, Curb Records reissued the album as Unchained Melody: The Early Years (1997). "Broken Wing" as well as alternate recordings of "Why Can't We" and "Middle Man" appeared on her second compilation album, God Bless America (2001).

== Track listing ==
No.	Title	Writer(s)	Length
1.	"Blue"	Bill Mack	2:44
2.	"Sure Thing"	Joyce Harrison	2:39
3.	"I'll Get Even with You"	Coweta House	3:16
4.	"Why Can't We"	Allen Shamblin; Austin Cunningham; Chuck Cannon	3:49
5.	"The Rest Is History"	Clay Blaker; Karen Staley	3:09
6.	"Broken Wing"	David Nowlen	3:20
7.	"Cowboy's Sweetheart"	Patsy Montana	2:31
8.	"Middle Man"	David Patillo	4:22
9.	"Share My Love"	Blake Vickers; LeAnn Rimes	2:44*
10.	"Yesterday"	Lennon–McCartney	3:08
11.	"I Will Always Love You"	Dolly Parton	4:37
Total length:			36:42

== Personnel ==
Credits for All That were adapted from liner notes.

- Bob Smith – bass guitar
- Brad Billingsley – drums
- Check Rippey – fiddle
- Crista Carnes – background vocals
- Greg Walker – assistant producer
- Johnny Mulhair – acoustic guitar, engineer, electric guitar, mandolin, producer, steel guitar
- Kayla Powell – background vocals
- LeAnn Rimes – lead vocals
- Lisa Criss – background vocals
- Paul Goad – piano, bass guitar, keyboards
- Ray Carl – harmonica
- Whitney Mulhair – flute
- Wilbur C. Rimes – producer
