= Among My Souvenirs =

1927 song by Edgar Leslie and Horatio Nicholls (Lawrence Wright)

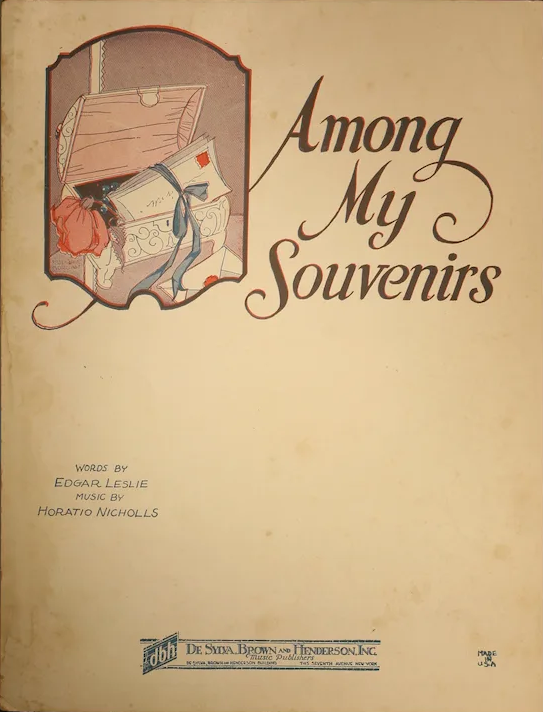
- Sheet music cover, 1927

Single by Paul Whiteman and his Concert Orchestra
- B-side: "Washboard Blues"
- Published: October 25, 1927 by De Sylva, Brown, & Henderson Inc., New York
- Released: February 1928
- Recorded: November 22, 1927
- Studio: Victor Studios, 952 N. Michigan Ave., Chicago, Illinois
- Genre: Popular music
- Label: Victor 35877
- Composer: Horatio Nicholls
- Lyricist: Edgar Leslie

"Among My Souvenirs"

Single by Connie Francis

from the album More Greatest Hits
- B-side: "God Bless America"
- Released: November 1959
- Genre: Pop
- Length: 2:28
- Label: MGM 12841
- Songwriters: Edgar Leslie, Horatio Nicholls

Connie Francis singles chronology
"You're Gonna Miss Me" / "Plenty Good Lovin'" (1959)	"Among My Souvenirs" (1959)	"Mama" (1960)

"Among My Souvenirs" is a 1927 song with words by Edgar Leslie and music by Horatio Nicholls (a pseudonym for British composer Frederick Lawrence Wright).

== Original version ==
The earliest known version of "Among My Souvenirs" was recorded by The Kit-Cat Band on September 19, 1927. It was first a number one chart hit for Paul Whiteman in 1928. Whiteman's recording was recorded November 22, 1927, and released by Victor Records as catalog number 35877A.

In Lullaby of Broadway, by Patricia Dubin McGuire (Secaucus NJ: Citadel Press, 1983) it is stated that Al Dubin sold the song to Edgar Leslie for $25 (page 94).

== Other charting versions ==
- In 1959, Connie Francis recorded the song; it peaked at number seven on the Hot 100. The Connie Francis version also peaked at number ten on the R&B charts. In the United Kingdom, the song reached number 11. Her version was arranged by Ray Ellis. In Canada it reached number two.
- In 1976, Marty Robbins had his sixteenth and last number one on the country charts with his version of the song. In Canada his version reached number three.

== Additional versions ==
Over the years, the song has been covered by many artists including:

- Al Bowlly (Matrix 684bd; B-41884 recorded c. September-October 1927)
- Louis Armstrong (Decca catalog number 4327A, recorded April 17, 1942, with the flip side "Coquette")
- Bing Crosby and Russ Morgan's Orchestra (Decca catalog number 23745A, recorded August 22, 1946, with the flip side "Does Your Heart Beat for Me?")
- Judy Garland (recorded for Capitol Records in February or March, 1957)
- Bob Haring and the Regent Club Orchestra (Brunswick catalog number 3723, recorded November 14, 1927, with the flip side "The Song Is Ended")
- Eddy Howard (Columbia catalog number 35949, recorded June 28, 1940, with the flip side "Tonight You Belong to Me")
- Roger Wolfe Kahn (Released 6 January 1928)
- James Melton (Columbia catalog number 1238D, recorded December 14, 1927, with the flip side "Dear, on a Night like This")
- Alvino Rey and his Orchestra (Capitol catalog number 338, recorded 1946, with the flip side "Save Your Sorrow")
- Ben Selvin and his Orchestra (Columbia catalog number 1188D, recorded October 1927, with the flip side "Dream Kisses" by The Ipana Troubadours)
- Frank Sinatra (Columbia catalog number 37161, recorded July 1946, with the flip side "September Song")
- Paul Weston and his Orchestra (Columbia catalog number 39509, with the flip side "Moon Song")
- Joni James on her album Among My Souvenirs (MGM, 1957)
- Hank Snow on his album Country & Western Jamboree (RCA Victor, 1957)
- Marie Osmond on her album Who's Sorry Now (MGM, 1975)
- Ray Price on his posthumous farewell album Beauty Is... Ray Price: The Final Sessions (Amerimonte, 2014)

== In popular culture ==
The song is referenced by the character Al Stephenson (Fredric March) in the film The Best Years of Our Lives (1946). He requests the song and he and his wife Milly (Myrna Loy) dance to it as played by Hoagy Carmichael on the piano, at Butch's Bar. The music is developed in the movie's orchestral score by Hugo Friedhofer.

The song is referenced in the 2021 play Among My Souvenirs by Alex Margo Arden and Caspar Heinemann. It first premiered in Malmö on 22 August 2021 for World Pride and was performed at Barnens Scen, Malmö Folkets Park.

== See also ==
- See Laura Weber White for her 2003 solo album Among My Souvenirs.
