= The Light in Your Eyes =

- Commercial single cover; "The Light in Your Eyes" was also released alongside "Blue" as a B-side track.

Single by LeAnn Rimes

from the album Blue
- B-side: "Blue"
- Released: March 7, 1997
- Recorded: 1996
- Genre: Country
- Length: 3:20
- Label: Curb
- Songwriter: Dan Tyler
- Producers: Chuck Howard; Johnny Mulhair; Wilbur C. Rimes

LeAnn Rimes singles chronology
"Unchained Melody" (1997)	"The Light in Your Eyes" (1997)	"How Do I Live" (1997)

"The Light in Your Eyes" is a song written by Dan Tyler, and recorded by American country music artist LeAnn Rimes. It was released in March 1997 as the fourth and final single from her debut album Blue. The song made it to number five on the Billboard Hot Country Singles & Tracks chart in 1997.

== Charts ==
Chart (1997)	Peak position
Canada Country Singles (RPM)	13
US Hot Country Songs (Billboard)	5
US Top Country Singles Sales (Billboard) with "Blue"	3

=== Year-end charts ===
Chart (1997)	Position
Canada Country Tracks (RPM)	97
US Country Songs (Billboard)	29
