= Unchained Melody: The Early Years =

Studio album (reissue) by LeAnn Rimes
- Released: February 11, 1997
- Recorded: 1994–1995
- Studios: Norman Petty (Clovis, N.M.), Rosewood (Tyler, Tex.), Masterfonics (Nashville)
- Genre: Country
- Length: 32:36
- Label: Curb Records
- Producers: Greg Walker; Johnny Mulhair; Wilbur C. Rimes

LeAnn Rimes chronology
Blue (1996)	Unchained Melody: The Early Years (1997)	You Light Up My Life: Inspirational Songs (1997)

Singles from Unchained Melody: The Early Years
- 1. "Unchained Melody" Released: December 17, 1996

Unchained Melody: The Early Years or simply The Early Years is the major label reissue of American country singer LeAnn Rimes's second studio album, All That (1994). The album was released in the United States on February 11, 1997 by Curb Records. The album contains seven tracks from All That alongside three new tracks. All That was originally released independently, and Unchained Melody: The Early Years was issued due to the sales success of her debut major label album, Blue (1996). "Unchained Melody" (originally by The Righteous Brothers) was released as the sole single from the album.

Unchained Melody: The Early Years contains several cover versions alongside original material. The album was certified 2× Platinum for shipments of two million copies in the United States. It debuted at number one on the Billboard 200, making her the fourth solo artist under the age of 18 to achieve this feat. Despite its commercial success, the album received generally negative reviews from music critics, who criticized its production and deemed the release premature.

== Background ==
All That was originally released independently on July 22, 1994 on the Nor Va Jak label. The album sold 15,000 copies upon its release locally in the Dallas–Fort Worth metroplex. All That led to Rimes being signed to Curb Records when the album was obtained by label head Mike Curb, who was impressed her vocal ability. Its reissue under Curb Records was quickly conceived following the surprise success of the single "Unchained Melody", which was released as the sole single from the album on December 17, 1996. "Unchained Melody" was first included as the b-side to the single "One Way Ticket (Because I Can)" and on the promotional single "Put a Little Holiday in Your Heart". The song was not originally intended to be a single, but unsolicited airplay of the song led to Curb officially releasing it to radio; Curb then began promoting it as a single from Unchained Melody: The Early Years. Hoping to capitalize on the release of the single and the sales performance of her debut major label album, Blue (1996), Curb announced the release of Unchained Melody: The Early Years on December 28, 1996. The album was released on February 11, 1997.

Following the release of the album, "Unchained Melody" peaked at number three on the Country Songs chart in March 1997. Other tracks new to the release were Rimes's cover of Bill Monroe's "Blue Moon of Kentucky" and the song "River of Love". All of the songs first included on All That were recorded when Rimes was eleven years old between April and June 1994, while the three new tracks were recorded when she was twelve. "Put a Little Holiday in Your Heart" was initially reported to be included on the album, but did not make the final track listing. Cover songs on the album include "I Want to Be a Cowboy's Sweetheart" by Patsy Montana, "Blue Moon of Kentucky" by Bill Monroe, "I Will Always Love You" by Dolly Parton, and "Yesterday" by The Beatles.

== Critical reception ==
Professional ratings
Review scores
Source	Rating
AllMusic	2.5/5 stars
The Rolling Stone Album Guide	1/5 stars

The album received generally negative reviews from music critics. Jose F. Promis of AllMusic stated that the album's title was "a tad bizarre" due to Rimes only being 13 when Blue (1996) became a hit record. He wrote that it was "a record without any sort of real emotion or depth" but also wrote that "the vocal chops, considering the source, are nothing less than astounding." Ken Tucker from Entertainment Weekly felt that the album was premature and that the material with emotional "grown-up lyrics" was inappropriate for Rimes. Richard Harringon from The Washington Post described the album as unimpressive, writing: "The vocal mannerisms aren't developed yet and the production is dreadful." The Rolling Stone Album Guide criticized the album and Wilbur Rimes's production skills, describing it as a cash-grab.

== Commercial performance ==
In the week ending March 1, 1997, Unchained Melody: The Early Years debuted at number one on the Billboard 200, making Rimes the fourth solo artist under the age of 18 to achieve this feat. In its first week, the album sold 166,000 copies. It dropped to number 2 its second week with 133,500 copies sold.

== Track listing ==
Unchained Melody: The Early Years track listing
No.	Title	Writer(s)	Length
1.	"Cowboy's Sweetheart"	Patsy Montana	2:32
2.	"I Will Always Love You"	Dolly Parton	4:38
3.	"Blue Moon of Kentucky"	Bill Monroe	3:17
4.	"River of Love"	Buddy Blackmon; Vip Vipperman	3:19
5.	"The Rest Is History"	Clay Blaker; Karen Staley	3:09
6.	"Broken Wing"	David Nowlen	3:20
7.	"Yesterday"	Lennon-McCartney	3:09
8.	"Sure Thing"	Joyce Harrison	2:41
9.	"Share My Love"	Rimes; Blake Vickers	2:40
10.	"Unchained Melody"	Alex North; Hy Zaret	3:51
Total length:			32:36

== Personnel ==
Credits for Unchained Melody: The Early Years were adapted from liner notes of All That. Additional credits adapted from liner notes of the album.

- Bob Smith — bass guitar
- Brad Billingsley — drums
- Chuck Rippey — fiddle
- Crista Carnes — background vocals
- Curtis Randall — bass guitar
- Fred Gleber — drums
- Gary Beevers — dobro, steel guitar
- Gary Leach — assistant mixing, assistant recording
- Glenn Meadows — mastering
- Greg Hunt — mixing, recording
- Greg Walker — assistant producer, assistant mixing, assistant recording
- Jerry Matheny — electric guitar
- Jimmy Kelly — keyboards
- Johnny Mulhair — acoustic guitar, co-producer, electric guitar, engineer, mandolin, mixing, recording, steel guitar
- Joy Mckay — background vocals
- Kayla Powell — background vocals
- Kelly Glenn — keyboards
- LeAnn Rimes — lead vocals
- Lisa Criss — background vocals
- Mike Mclain — keyboards, recording
- Milo Deering — steel guitar
- Paul Goad — bass guitar, keyboards, piano
- Perry Coleman — background vocals
- Ray Carl — harmonica
- Whitney Mulhair — flute
- Wilbur C. Rimes — producer, mixing

== Charts ==
=== Weekly charts ===
Weekly chart performance for Unchained Melody: The Early Years
Chart (1997)	Peak position
Australian Albums (ARIA)	4
Canada Top Albums/CDs (RPM)	19
Canadian Country Albums (RPM)	1
UK Country Albums (Official Charts)	9
US Billboard 200	1
US Top Country Albums (Billboard)	1

=== Year end-charts ===
Chart (1997)	Position
Australian Albums (ARIA)	71
Canadian Country Albums (RPM)	5
US Billboard 200	21
US Top Country Albums (Billboard)	3
Chart (1998)	Position
US Top Country Albums (Billboard)	31

== Certifications and sales ==
Region	Certification	Certified units/sales
Australia (ARIA)	Gold	35,000^{^}
Canada (Music Canada)	Platinum	100,000^{^}
United States (RIAA)	2× Platinum	2,000,000^{^}
^{^} Shipments figures based on certification alone.
