= All That I Am (Deborah Allen album) =

Studio album by Deborah Allen
- Released: July 19, 1994
- Genre: Country pop
- Length: 37:54
- Label: Giant
- Producer: James Stroud, Deborah Allen

Deborah Allen chronology
Delta Dreamland (1993)	All That I Am (1994)	Hands On (2000)

Professional ratings
Review scores
Source	Rating
Allmusic	4.5/5 stars

All That I Am is the fifth album by Deborah Allen and released by Giant Records in 1994.

== Track listing ==
No.	Title	Writer(s)	Length
1.	"Break These Chains (Acapella Intro)"	Deborah Allen; Mary Ann Kennedy; Kye Fleming	0:43
2.	"Break These Chains"	Deborah Allen; Mary Ann Kennedy; Kye Fleming	2:50
3.	"Wrong Side Of Love"	Deborah Allen; Rafe Van Hoy; Al Anderson	3:03
4.	"Thinkin' Again"	Deborah Allen	3:33
5.	"My Baby"	Deborah Allen	2:50
6.	"Give It To Me"	Deborah Allen; Al Anderson	3:23
7.	"Talkin' To My Heart"	Deborah Allen; Rafe Van Hoy; Billy Burnette	4:08
8.	"Blame It On The Heat"	Deborah Allen; Rafe Van Hoy; Billy Burnette	3:30
9.	"Hurt Me"	Deborah Allen; Rafe Van Hoy; Bobby Braddock	2:57
10.	"Leave My Heart Alone"	Deborah Allen; Greg Foresman	3:51
11.	"Boys On The Wrong Side Of Town"	Deborah Allen; Chari Pirtle	3:25
12.	"All That I Am"	Deborah Allen; Mary Ann Kennedy; Kye Fleming	3:41
Total length:			37:54

- Track information and credits taken from the album's liner notes.

== Musicians ==
- Lead vocals: Deborah Allen
- Drums: Dony Wynn
- Bass: Glenn Worf
- Keyboards: Bill Cuomo, Steve Nathan
- Acoustic guitar: Larry Byrom, Al Anderson
- Electric guitar: Greg Foresman, Dan Huff, Bill "Cab" McDermott
- 6 string bass guitar: Dan Huff
- Steel/Lap steel: Dan Dugmore
- Fiddle: Tammy Rogers
- Mandolin: Mary Ann Kennedy
- Background vocals: Deborah Allen, Mary Ann Kennedy, Billy Burnette

== Production ==
- Produced by James Stroud, Deborah Allen
- Recorded by Lynn Peterzell, Julian King
- Assistant engineer: Mark Hagen
- Mixing by Lynn Peterzell
- Mastered by Denny Purcell
- A&R Direction by Michelle Payne, Abbe Nameche
- Production assistants: Abbe Nameche, Doug Rich
- Production coordinators: Michelle Payne, Anna Mitchell
