= I Hurt for You =

Single by Deborah Allen

from the album Cheat the Night
- B-side: "Cheat the Night"
- Released: May 26, 1984
- Genre: Country
- Length: 3:48
- Label: RCA
- Songwriter(s): Deborah Allen, Rafe Van Hoy
- Producer(s): Rafe Van Hoy

Deborah Allen singles chronology
"I've Been Wrong Before" (1983)	"I Hurt for You" (1984)	"Heartache and a Half" (1984)

"I Hurt for You" is a song co-written and recorded by American country music artist Deborah Allen. It was released in May 1984 as the third single from the album Cheat the Night. The song reached #10 on the Billboard Hot Country Singles & Tracks chart. The song was written by Allen and Rafe Van Hoy.

The album version of the song is different from the single version, which adds more harmony vocals and features a different drum and percussion arrangement.

Conway Twitty recorded a version of the song in 1993 and it was included on his final studio album Final Touches.

== Chart performance ==
Chart (1984)	Peak position
US Hot Country Songs (Billboard)	10
Canadian RPM Country Tracks	17
