= Cheat the Night =

EP by Deborah Allen
- Released: 1983
- Genre: Country
- Length: 21:57
- Label: RCA
- Producer: Rafe Van Hoy

Deborah Allen chronology
Trouble in Paradise (1980)	Cheat the Night (1983)	Let Me Be the First (1984)

Professional ratings
Review scores
Source	Rating
AllMusic	4.5/5 stars

Cheat the Night is an extended play by country pop singer Deborah Allen. Released in 1983 via RCA Records, the album includes the singles "Baby I Lied," "I've Been Wrong Before," and "I Hurt for You." Although this has never been on CD, four of its six tracks (the singles and "Cheat the Night") appeared on her later Anthology compilation. It has since been added to streaming services.

== Critical reception ==
Michael McCall of AllMusic writes, "An EP features her two best-known hits of the 1980s, "Baby I Lied" and "I've Been Wrong Before." It's sweeter and softer-edged than her '90s work."

== Track listing ==
All tracks are written by Deborah Allen and Rafe Van Hoy, unless otherwise noted.

No.	Title	Writer(s)	Length
1.	"Baby I Lied"	Deborah Allen; Rafe Van Hoy; Rory Bourke	4:10
2.	"Cheat the Night"		3:56
3.	"Fool's Paradise"		3:27
4.	"I Hurt for You"		3:48
5.	"What's the Matter with Me"	Allen; Van Hoy; Don Cook	3:35
6.	"I've Been Wrong Before"	Allen; Van Hoy; Cook	3:01
Total length:			21:57

== Musicians ==
- Deborah Allen – lead vocals
- Fred Tackett – acoustic guitar (track 1)
- Buzzy Feiten – electric guitar (track 1)
- George Doering – electric guitar (track 1)
- Neil Stubenhaus – bass (track 1)
- Rick Shlosser - drums (track 1)
- Robbie Buchanan – keyboards and synthesizers (track 1)
- Eddie Bayers – drums and percussion (tracks 2 to 6)
- Tom Robb – bass (tracks 2 to 6)
- Dennis Burnside – keyboards (tracks 2 to 6)
- Bobby Ogdin – keyboards (tracks 2 to 6)
- Steve Gibson – electric rhythm guitar (tracks 2 to 6)
- Weldon Myrick – steel guitar (tracks 2 to 6)
- Rafe Van Hoy – acoustic guitar and synthesizer (tracks 2 to 6)
- Strings (tracks 2 to 6)
  - Arranged by Dennis Burnside
  - Performed by Carl Gorodetzky & The Nashville String Machine
- Background vocals (track 1)
  - Herb Pedersen
  - Joey Scarbury
- Background vocals (tracks 2 to 6)
  - Don Gant
  - Dennis Wilson
  - Deborah Allen

== Production ==
- Produced by Rafe Van Hoy (tracks 2 to 6)
- Produced and arranged by Charles Calello (track 1)
- Mastered by Hank Williams
- Recorded and mixed by Rick Rugger (track 1)
- Recorded and mixed by Pat McMakin (tracks 2 to 6)
- Additional recording by Russ Martin and Todd Cerney (tracks 2 to 6)
- Assistant engineers – Russ Martin and Keith Odle (tracks 2 to 6)
- Recorded and mixed at Ocean Way and The Mix Room (track 1)
- Recorded and mixed at Emerald Sound Studio (tracks 2 to 6)
- Additional recording at Creative Workshop & Sound Stage Studio (tracks 2 to 6)
- Photography by Mark Tucker
- Art direction by Bill Brunt

Track information and credits adapted from the EP's liner notes.

== Charts ==
=== Weekly charts ===
Chart (1984)	Peak position
US Billboard 200	67
US Top Country Albums (Billboard)	10

=== Year-end charts ===
Chart (1984)	Position
US Top Country Albums (Billboard)	25

=== Singles ===
Single	Year	Chart	Peak positions
"Baby I Lied"	1983	Hot Country Songs	4
"Baby I Lied"	1983	Adult Contemporary	10
"Baby I Lied"	1984	Hot 100	26
"I've Been Wrong Before"	1984	Hot Country Songs	2
"I Hurt For You"	1984	Hot Country Songs	10
