= God Bless America (charity album) =

2001 compilation album

Compilation album by Various Artists
- Released: October 16, 2001
- Recorded: 1945–2001
- Genre: Various
- Length: 62:11
- Label: Columbia/CBS Records; CT 86300
- Producer: Various

God Bless America is a 2001 charity album composed of American patriotic or spiritual songs, released on October 16 of that year in the wake of the September 11, 2001, terrorist attacks. It was released specifically to benefit the Twin Towers Fund, directing what the album cover said would be a "substantial portion of the proceeds" towards families of firefighters, police officers, and other responders lost in the rescue response to the September 11 attacks. The artists and recordings featured were largely from Columbia Records.

== History ==
Following the September 11 attacks, Canadian pop star Celine Dion performed a new arrangement of "God Bless America" on the telethon America: A Tribute to Heroes. The recorded version of this, done the day before the telethon in the event something happened and Dion could not appear, became the title track of this compilation. It, along with a live acoustic performance by John Mellencamp, were the only tracks on the album not to have been previously released.

The selections ranged over many decades, with recordings being used going back to 1945. The span of material was quite large; the album included "This Land Is Your Land", which Woody Guthrie had written in annoyed reaction to "God Bless America", as well as both the overtly patriotic "God Bless the USA" and the far different "Blowin' in the Wind". Two live recordings are used, both performances in New York City.

== Reception ==
The album debuted at number 1 on the Billboard 200, selling 181,000 copies in its first week of release. In doing so, it became the first charity album to reach the top since USA for Africa's We Are the World in 1985. Dion's title track single also received enough radio airplay to reach number 14 on Billboard's Hot Adult Contemporary Tracks chart. The album's release came at a time when a number of similarly themed albums were being released, and many patriotic and inspirational American songs were showing up on the pop charts. The latter included "God Bless the USA" as well as different recordings of "The Star-Spangled Banner" and "America the Beautiful".

Music writer Robert Hilburn of the Los Angeles Times termed the compilation an "unlikely combination" while writing that "patriotism makes strange bedfellows." Rolling Stone said it was a "can't miss collection" with an artist array that "seems to have a little something for everyone." Allmusic states that, "Touching the worlds of pop, folk, rock, gospel, country, and more, God Bless America was designed with the feelings of troubled Americans in mind."

== Track listing ==
#	Title	Writer(s)	Performer	Original release	Length
1	"God Bless America"	Irving Berlin	Celine Dion	2001	3:47
2	"Land of Hope and Dreams"	Bruce Springsteen	Bruce Springsteen & The E Street Band (2000 live recording)	2001	9:32
3	"Hero"	Mariah Carey, Walter Afanasieff	Mariah Carey	1993	4:20
4	"Amazing Grace"	John Newton, Southern Harmony	Tramaine Hawkins	1994	7:10
5	"Blowin' in the Wind"	Bob Dylan	Bob Dylan	1963	2:48
6	"Bridge over Troubled Water"	Paul Simon	Simon & Garfunkel	1970	4:55
7	"Peaceful World"	John Mellencamp	John Mellencamp (unreleased 2001 live acoustic version)	2001	3:38
8	"There's a Hero"	Don Cook, John Barlow Jarvis	Billy Gilman	2000	3:28
9	"America the Beautiful"	Katharine Lee Bates, Samuel A. Ward	Frank Sinatra	1945	2:33
10	"God Bless the USA"	Lee Greenwood	Lee Greenwood	1984	3:16
11	"This Land Is Your Land"	Woody Guthrie	Pete Seeger	1964	3:02
12	"Coming Out of the Dark"	Gloria Estefan, Emilio Estefan Jr., Jon Secada	Gloria Estefan	1991	4:05
13	"We Shall Overcome"	Zilphia Horton, Frank Hamilton, Guy Carawan, Pete Seeger	Mahalia Jackson	1963	2:46
14	"The Star-Spangled Banner"	Francis Scott Key, John Stafford Smith	The Mormon Tabernacle Choir	1963	2:34
15	"Lean on Me"	Bill Withers	Bill Withers	1972	4:17

Source: Album liner notes, except track times

== Charts ==
=== Weekly ===
Chart (2001–02)	Peak position
Belgian Compilation Albums (Ultratop Wallonia)	17
Swiss Compilation Albums (Schweizer Hitparade)	11
US Billboard 200	1

=== Year-end charts ===
Chart (2001)	Position
US Billboard 200	159

Chart (2002)	Position
US Billboard 200	158
