= Baby I Lied =

1983 single by Deborah Allen

Single by Deborah Allen

from the album Cheat the Night
- B-side: "Time Is Taking You Away from Me"
- Released: August 20, 1983
- Genre: Country
- Length: 4:09
- Label: RCA
- Songwriters: Deborah Allen, Rafe Van Hoy, Rory Bourke
- Producer: Charles Calello

Deborah Allen singles chronology
"Don't Stop Lovin' Me" (1982)	"Baby I Lied" (1983)	"I've Been Wrong Before" (1983)

"Baby I Lied" is a song recorded by American country music artist Deborah Allen. It was released in August 1983 as the first single from the album Cheat the Night. The song reached number 4 on the Billboard Hot Country Singles & Tracks chart. It was also her only hit on the Billboard Hot 100, where it went to number 26. The song was written by Allen, Rafe Van Hoy and Rory Bourke.

The B-side of the single, "Time is Taking You Away from Me" was written by Allen and Van Hoy, and is a track that has not appeared on any subsequent albums.

== Critical reception ==
In The Encyclopedia of Country Music, Mary A. Bufwack wrote that the song showed "Allen's country-pop style, marked by a wall of sound and soulful singing".

== Chart performance ==
Chart (1983–1984)	Peak position
Australia (Kent Music Report)	31
US Hot Country Songs (Billboard)	4
US Billboard Hot 100	26
US Adult Contemporary (Billboard)	10
US Cash Box Top 100	23

== Shannon Brown version ==
"Baby I Lied"

Single by Shannon Brown

from the album Untangle My Heart
- B-side: "Untangle My Heart"
- Released: August 20, 2001
- Genre: Country
- Length: 3:40
- Label: BNA
- Songwriters: Deborah Allen; Rafe Van Hoy; Rory Michael Bourke
- Producer: Byron Gallimore

Shannon Brown singles chronology
"Half a Man" (1999)	"Baby I Lied" (2001)	"Untangle My Heart" (2002)

Shannon Brown released a cover of "Baby I Lied", releasing it on August 20, 2001, as her debut single for BNA Records, following getting dropped by Arista Nashville; at the time, Brown was the only female artist signed with the label. Her version was supposed to be the lead single to her second planned debut album, this one titled Untangle My Heart, which was planned for a January 2002 release. The album was never released and Brown was dropped by BNA following the album's second single "Untangle My Heart".

=== Content ===
Brown said of the decision to cover the song in a Radio & Records interview, "It was such an incredible record. I just wanted to make sure we could do it justice. Vocally, I did a few things that are me, but Deborah's vocal was absolutely amazing. It's a timeless song, and I just tried to make it my song as well."

=== Critical reception ===
Deborah Evans Price of Billboard praised Brown's version of the song, saying that it "stands the test of time" and "Brown turns in a fine performance, shaded with ache and regret."

=== Charts ===
Chart (2001)	Peak position
US Hot Country Songs (Billboard)	40

== Other cover versions ==
- Tracey Ullman recorded a cover of the song shortly after Allen released the song as a single.
