= Let Me Be the First =

Studio album by Deborah Allen
- Released: 1984
- Genre: Country pop
- Length: 40:28
- Label: RCA
- Producer: Rafe Van Hoy

Deborah Allen chronology
Trouble in Paradise (1980)	Let Me Be the First (1984)	Telepathy (1987)

Professional ratings
Review scores
Source	Rating
Allmusic	3.0/5 stars

Let Me Be the First is the second album by Deborah Allen, released by RCA Records in 1984.

== Track listing ==
No.	Title	Writer(s)	Length
1.	"I Can't Stand It"	Deborah Allen; Rafe Van Hoy; Bobby Braddock	3:27
2.	"Your Love"	Allen; Van Hoy; Steve Diamond	3:25
3.	"Please Don't Fall in Love"	Allen; Van Hoy; Eddie Struzick	3:55
4.	"Prove You Right"	Allen; Van Hoy	5:08
5.	"If I Didn't Love You"	Allen; Van Hoy	3:56
6.	"Let Me Be the First"	Allen; Van Hoy; Kix Brooks	4:08
7.	"You Do It"	Allen; Van Hoy; Struzick	4:13
8.	"Heartache and a Half"	Allen; Van Hoy; Struzick	4:36
9.	"It's a Good Thing"	Allen; Van Hoy	3:55
10.	"It Makes Me Cry"	Allen	3:45
Total length:			40:28

- Track information and credits taken from the album's liner notes.

== Personnel ==
- Deborah Allen - lead vocals
- Eddie Bayers - drums, percussion
- Tom Robb - bass
- Brent Rowan - electric guitar
- Steve Gibson - electric guitar, acoustic guitar
- Bobby Wood - organ
- John Jarvis - piano, keyboards
- Rafe Van Hoy - acoustic guitar, synthesizer
- Jim Horn - saxophone
- Steve Nathan - synthesizer

== Production ==
- Producer: Rafe Van Hoy
- Engineer: Chuck Ainlay
- Mastered by: Hank Williams
