= Blue (Bill Mack song) =

1958 single by Bill Mack

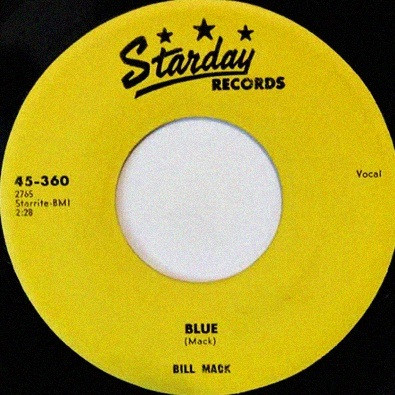

Single by Bill Mack
- B-side: "Faded Rose"
- Released: May 1958
- Recorded: 1956; Nesman Recording Studios in Wichita Falls, Texas
- Genre: Country
- Length: 2:28
- Label: Starday
- Songwriter: Bill Mack

Bill Mack singles chronology
"Million Miles Away" / "Cheatin' On Your Mind" (1957)	"Blue" (1958)	"Long, Long Train" / "I'll Still Be Here Tomorrow" (1959)

"Blue" is a song released in 1958 by Bill Mack, an American songwriter-country artist and country radio disc jockey. It has since been covered by several artists. The song won Mack the 1996 Grammy Award for Best Country Song, a 1996 Academy of Country Music Award for Song of the Year, a 1997 Country Music Association Awards nomination for Song of the Year, a 1997 Country Radio Music Awards nomination for Song of the Year, and is included on the CMT list of the top 100 country songs of all time. Rimes' rendition won the 1997 Grammy for Best Female Country Vocal Performance.

== Composition ==
"Blue" is a heartache ballad about a lonely man who is wondering why his lover can't be blue or lonely over him. However, he later realizes that words his lover had whispered were only lies:

"Blue
Oh, so lonesome for you
Why can't you be blue over me?"

== History ==
Contrary to popular opinion, Mack has often denied that Patsy Cline was his inspiration for writing the song, stating "I didn't write it for Patsy. I never wrote one for anybody." In his autobiography Bill Mack's Memories from the Trenches of Broadcasting, Mack again debunks the publicity claim that he had written the song specifically for Cline, when in fact he did not have Cline in mind when he wrote it. According to his self-penned article for Truckers Connection, Mack reveals that his "most noteworthy inspirations [for creating compositions] have been a billboard and attempting to create note changes on a new guitar" in which he also states:

Inevitably, I would be approached with the question, "What inspired you to write the song?" I wrote "Blue" while picking my new guitar in my home in Wichita Falls, Texas. I was creating some note changes on the guitar when the song entered my mind. Although I wasn't watching the clock, the melody and lyrics came to me in a completed form within 15 minutes. My wife at the time said, "That's the best song I've ever heard! You need to record it as soon as you can!

Mack composed "Blue" within 15 minutes and recorded it in two takes at Nesman Recording Studios in Wichita Falls, Texas. He released it as a 45 rpm single backed by "Faded Rose" for Starday Records, catalog number 360. The Billboard newsweekly on June 2, 1958, described Mack's recording of "Blue" as "A slow-tempo, relaxed item, with Mack's vocal backed by instrumentation featuring a honkytonk type piano. A flavorsome side."

His recording received a limited amount of radio airplay and sold fairly well regionally, but it did not become popular. Disc jockey Snuff Garrett strongly believed the song to be a "surefire hit for the future," so Mack hired a local female singer to make a demo tape recording of "Blue" in 1962 and placed it on a stack of many other songs he had written.

Mack's friend Roy Drusky suggested he pitch "Blue" to Patsy Cline in an effort to make the song a hit, so Mack gave a tape to Cline's husband Charlie Dick, but Cline died in a plane crash in 1963 before she could record it.

The song became a multi-platinum hit for LeAnn Rimes, in 1996. Although it was claimed that Mack had been waiting to find the right vocalist to record "Blue" for all that time, the song was recorded by at least five artists (Mack himself in 1958, Kenny Roberts in 1966, Roy Drusky circa 1960-70s, Polly Stephens Exley in the late 1980s, and Kathryn Pitt in 1993) prior to LeAnn Rimes.

Mack's album Bill Mack Sings His Songs (1998), released as a CD and audio cassette, includes his original recording of "Blue".

== Kenny Roberts version ==
"Blue"

Single by Kenny Roberts
- B-side: "Sioux City Sue"
- Released: November 1966
- Genre: Country
- Length: 2:12
- Label: Starday
- Songwriter: Bill Mack
- Producer: Tommy Hill

Kenny Roberts singles chronology
"Anytime" / "Tying the Leaves" (1966)	"Blue" (1966)	"Just Look, Don't Touch" / "Singing River" (1967)

Kenny Roberts released "Blue" in 1966 as a 45 rpm single backed with "Sioux City Sue" for Starday Records, catalog number 788. Roberts, who was a successful country singer since 1949 (with his hit single "I Never See Maggie Alone", and other recordings with Coral and Decca Records throughout the 1950s) signed to Starday in 1965. Don Pierce, Starday president and co-founder who had worked with Mack to record "Blue", gave Roberts the song to make the song a hit. Roberts revised the song by adding the yodel to it. Pierce believed the song had hit potential and promoted Robert's recording with his best effort, but the song did not become popular.

Roberts' recording of "Blue" was reissued by Starday as the ninth track on his LP The Incredible Kenny Roberts (1967), by Bluebonnet catalog number 201 as the fifth track on his LP You're My Kind of People (1988), by Gusto Records as the ninth track on the 2-CD and digital download compilation Country Stars (2006) and as the first track on the digital download EP Gusto's Top Hits: Kenny Roberts (2008).

== Polly Stephens Exley version ==
In the late 1980s, Fort Worth singer-songwriter Polly Stephens Exley (also known as Polly Stephens, Polly Exley and Pauline Stephens) recorded "Blue" but released less than 500 tapes. On February 13, 1997, Exley filed a trial by jury suit in a Tarrant County federal court, the United States District Court for the Northern District of Texas, for copyright infringement against Bill Mack, Broadcast Music, Carlin America, Curb Records, Fort Knox Music, Hal Leonard Corporation and Trio Music. Exley stated that she wrote the second verse of "Blue" in 1987 and should be compensated with 50 percent of the writer's royalties. In September 1997, the parties said they had settled the dispute awarding royalties to Polly Stephens Exley, but was issued a gag order not to publicly talk about her role in the writing of the song. In January 1998, the case was dismissed. Exley re-recorded the song on October 1, 1997, with a transfer of copyright, and had it copyrighted on January 20, 1998, for Fort Knox Music and Trio Music.

== LeAnn Rimes versions ==
"Blue"

Single by LeAnn Rimes

from the album Blue
- B-side: "The Light in Your Eyes" (U.S.); "How Do I Live" (UK)
- Released: May 1996
- Recorded: 1993 (from All That album); 1996 (re-recorded)
- Genre: Country
- Length: 2:50
- Songwriter: Bill Mack
- Producer: Wilbur C. Rimes

LeAnn Rimes singles chronology
"Blue" (1996)	"Hurt Me" (1996)

American singer LeAnn Rimes first recorded the song at Norman Petty Studio in Clovis, NM, when she was 11 years old for her 1994 independent album All That. Rimes' father Wilbur and Dallas-Fort Worth manager Marty Rendleman received the Polly Stephens Exley version sent by Bill Mack when putting together the All That album. Wilbur Rimes disliked the demo stating "The first time I heard 'Blue' I didn't like it, but it was a demo version that sounded old fashion."

Rimes re-recorded the song for her debut album, Blue, in 1996 when she was 13. This recording was meant to be the B-side of Rimes' first single, "The Light in Your Eyes", but a ten-second tag of "Blue" on the promo record sent to radio stations drew the attention of DJs, so the A and B-sides were reversed and "Blue" became her first single. It debuted at #49 on the Billboard Country Chart for the week of 25 May 1996, becoming a major hit that summer, peaking at #10 on the Billboard Country Chart and #26 on the Billboard Hot 100, while also reaching #1 on the Canadian Country RPM singles chart. Rimes won the 1996 Grammy for Best Female Country Vocal Performance for this version, drawing the attention that earned Mack, as songwriter, that year's Grammy Award for Best Country Song.

Rimes recorded a third version with The Time Jumpers for her 2011 album Lady & Gentlemen, co-producing it with Darrell Brown.

"Blue" (1996)
A 28 second sample of Rimes' "Blue"

=== Critical reception ===
Shawn Haney of AllMusic stated the song was a "sleeper hit," a "radio-friendly airplay single" and that it should "affect listeners in a charismatic and lighthearted way." When re-released on Lady & Gentlemen, AllMusic's Stephen Thomas Erlewine said the new recording "illustrates just how far she's come -- how she’s become a stronger, more nuanced singer over the years." Larry Flick from Billboard magazine wrote, "What a set of pipes'... and this girl is only 13 years old. Her voice and the song's unique history are rapidly gaining attention at country radio. [...] One listen to this single, and it is obvious that 'Blue' has found the appropriate home. Rimes has a clear and strong voice, and she delivers the tune with a delightful yodel and lots of power. This could easily be the hottest new thing on country radio this summer."

=== Music video ===
The accompanying music video for "Blue" features Rimes sitting by Barton Springs Pool in the summer with sunglasses on while young men pass her by. Filmed in Austin, Texas, the music video was directed by Chris Rogers and produced by Hunter Hodge for Pecos Films. The video won two 1996 Billboard Music Awards for Best Country Music Video of the Year and Best New Artist Video of the Year. Country Music Television ranked "Blue" the number four video of the year and named Rimes the Female Rising Video Star of the Year in 1996. The Houston Press and the Austin American-Statesman described that the video alluded to a Lolita theme.

The music video is included on the bonus DVD for Rimes' Greatest Hits - Limited Edition album (2003) and on the Region 2 music DVD releases, The Best of LeAnn Rimes (2004) and LeAnn Rimes: The Complete DVD Collection (2006).

=== Track listing ===
- US CD single
1. "Blue" – 2:47
2. "The Light in Your Eyes" – 3:20
- UK Maxi CD single
1. "Blue" – 2:47
2. "How Do I Live" – 4:27
3. "Undeniable" – 3:44

=== Charts ===
==== Weekly charts ====
Chart (1996)	Peak position
Australia (ARIA)	10
Canada Country Singles (RPM)	1
Europe (Eurochart Hot 100)	89
UK Singles (OCC)	23
US Billboard Hot 100	26
US Hot Country Songs (Billboard)	10
US Top Country Singles Sales (Billboard)	1

==== Year-end chart ====
Year	Country	Position
1996	Australia	50

==== Certifications ====
Region	Certification	Certified units/sales
United States (RIAA)	Platinum	1,000,000
