= Blue (LeAnn Rimes album) =

1996 studio album by LeAnn Rimes

Studio album by LeAnn Rimes
- Released: July 9, 1996
- Genre: Country
- Length: 34:52
- Label: Curb
- Producers: Wilbur C. Rimes; Chuck Howard; Johnny Mulhair

LeAnn Rimes chronology
All That (1994)	Blue (1996)	Unchained Melody: The Early Years (1997)

Singles from Blue
- 1. "Blue" Released: June 4, 1996; 2. "Hurt Me" Released: August 3, 1996; 3. "One Way Ticket (Because I Can)" Released: September 28, 1996; 4. "The Light in Your Eyes" Released: March 7, 1997

Blue is the debut major-label album and third studio album by American country music artist LeAnn Rimes, released on July 9, 1996 in the United States, shortly before the singer’s fourteenth birthday, by Curb Records. It peaked at number three on the US Billboard 200, and number one on the Top Country Albums chart.

The album includes the singles "Blue", "Hurt Me", "One Way Ticket (Because I Can)", and "The Light in Your Eyes". Blue has been certified 6× Platinum by the Recording Industry Association of America (RIAA) and is Rimes's best-selling album.

"Blue" was originally recorded by Bill Mack as a single released in 1958. "Hurt Me" and "My Baby" were originally recorded by the song's writer, Deborah Allen, on her 1994 album All That I Am. "Cattle Call," a duet with Eddy Arnold, was originally recorded by its writer, Tex Owens, as his 1934 single.

== Background ==
Singles released from Blue include, in order of release: "Blue", "Hurt Me", "One Way Ticket (Because I Can)", and "The Light in Your Eyes". These songs all charted on the Billboard Hot Country Songs chart between 1996 and 1997; "Blue" and "The Light in Your Eyes" both reached top 10, while "Hurt Me" peaked at 43. "One Way Ticket" became a number one hit on the country music chart.

During the 1996 Christmas season, copies of the album sold at Target stores included the promotional single "Put a Little Holiday in Your Heart" as a free gift with purchase. The song peaked at number 51 on the Country Songs chart in January of the following year. "Unchained Melody", included as the single's b-side, peaked at number three on the Country Songs chart in March 1997 when released as a single from Unchained Melody: The Early Years (1997).

== Critical reception ==
Professional ratings
Review scores
Source	Rating
AllMusic	4/5 stars
Robert Christgau	(neither)
Entertainment Weekly	B+
Los Angeles Times	2.5/4 stars
The Rolling Stone Album Guide	4/5 stars

The album was met with generally positive reviews. Shawn M. Haney of AllMusic rated Blue four out of five stars, calling it "a glorious free-for-all of sassy pick-me-up country", and stated that "perhaps people of any age or style of interest will feel youthful again after a good listen and a half." Similarly, Entertainment Weekly gave the album a B+ and stated that "such raw, old-fashioned country music, with such a big, twangy, sexy voice at the center, wouldn't be making such a stir in bland '90s Nashville if LeAnn Rimes weren't 13. In other words, the hype machine has inadvertently coughed up a gem."

The Los Angeles Times gave the album two-and-a-half stars out of four and said that "Rimes displays the unbridled power and freshness you'd expect from a teenager. In an ideal world, she'd bring all that to bear on songs that tap her youthful zeal. Instead, too many on this major-label debut require a level of experience that's clearly beyond her years. There's no question Rimes has been blessed with a magnificent voice. Let's hope she'll be given a few years--say, at least until she's out of high school--to let her natural talent mature." In his "Consumer Guide" column, Robert Christgau gave the album a "neither" score, defined as an album which "may impress once or twice with consistent craft or an arresting track or two. Then it won't."

== Commercial performance ==
Blue debuted at number four on Billboard 200 with 123,000 copies sold in the week ending of July 27, 1996. It peaked at number three in its second week with 129,500 copies sold. Blue has been certified 6× Platinum by the Recording Industry Association of America (RIAA) and is Rimes's best-selling album.

== Track listing ==
Blue track listing
No.	Title	Writer(s)	Producer(s)	Length
1.	"Blue"	Bill Mack	Wilbur C. Rimes	2:49
2.	"Hurt Me"	Deborah Allen; Bobby Braddock; Rafe Van Hoy	W. Rimes	2:54
3.	"One Way Ticket (Because I Can)"	Keith Hinton; Judy Rodman	Chuck Howard; W. Rimes; Bob Campbell-Smith (Note: Signifies an assistant producer.)	3:44
4.	"My Baby"	Allen	W. Rimes	2:50
5.	"Honestly"	Christi Dannemiller; Joe Johnston	Howard; W. Rimes; Campbell-Smith	3:22
6.	"The Light in Your Eyes"	Dan Tyler	Howard; W. Rimes; Johnny Mulhair (Note: Signifies a co-producer.); Greg Walker; Campbell-Smith	3:21
7.	"Talk to Me"	Ron Grimes; L. Rimes; Jon Rutherford	Howard; W. Rimes; Campbell-Smith	3:12
8.	"I'll Get Even With You"	Coweta House	W. Rimes; Mulhair; Walker	3:18
9.	"Cattle Call" (duet with Eddy Arnold)	Tex Owens	Howard; W. Rimes; Mulhair; Walker; Campbell-Smith	3:09
10.	"Good Lookin' Man"	Joyce Harrison	W. Rimes	3:11
11.	"Fade to Blue"	Jim Allison; Anne Reeves; Lang Scott	W. Rimes; Mulhair; Walker	3:02
Total length:				34:52

"Put a Little Holiday in Your Heart" promotional single
No.	Title	Writer(s)	Producer(s)	Length
1.	"Put a Little Holiday in Your Heart"	Greg Wojohn; Roger Wojohn; Scott Wojohn	W. Rimes; Roger Wojohn	3:29
2.	"Unchained Melody"	Alex North; Hy Zaret	W. Rimes	3:51
Total length:				42:12

== Personnel ==
Musicians

- LeAnn Rimes – lead vocals
- Kelly Glenn – keyboards
- Paul Goad – acoustic piano, keyboards, bass
- John Hobbs – acoustic piano
- Jimmy Kelly – acoustic piano, keyboards
- Mike McClain – acoustic piano
- Steve Nathan – keyboards
- Dann Huff – electric guitar
- John Jorgenson – electric guitar
- Brent Rowan – electric guitar
- Jerry Matheny – acoustic guitar, electric guitar
- Johnny Mulhair – acoustic guitar, electric guitar, steel guitar
- Michael Spriggs – acoustic guitar
- Bruce Bouton – steel guitar
- Milo Deering – steel guitar
- Paul Franklin – steel guitar
- Mike Chapman – bass
- Curtis Randall – bass
- Bob Smith – bass
- Glenn Worf – bass
- Brad Billingsley – drums
- Chad Cromwell – drums
- Fred Gleber – drums
- Greg Morrow – drums
- Terry McMillan – percussion
- Kevin Bailey – harmonica
- Larry Franklin – fiddle
- Crista Carnes – backing vocals
- Perry Coleman – backing vocals
- Lisa Criss – backing vocals
- LaDonna Johnson – backing vocals
- Mary Ann Kennedy – backing vocals
- Joy McKay – backing vocals
- Kayla Powell – backing vocals
- Pam Rose – backing vocals
- Matthew Ward – backing vocals
- Dennis Wilson – backing vocals
- Eddy Arnold – lead vocals on "Cattle Call"

Production

- Wilbur C. Rimes – producer
- Chuck Howard – producer (3, 5, 6, 7, 9)
- Johnny Mulhair – co-producer (6, 8, 9, 11), recording, mixing
- Greg Hunt – recording, mixing
- Bob Campbell-Smith – recording, production assistant (3, 5, 6, 7, 9)
- Daniel Kresco – recording assistant
- Gary Leach – recording assistant, mix assistant
- Aaron Swihart – recording assistant
- Greg Walker – recording assistant, mix assistant, production assistant (6, 8, 9, 11)
- Jeff Watkins – recording assistant
- John Kelton – mixing
- Csaba Petocz – mixing
- David Hall – mix assistant
- Glenn Meadows – mastering
- Neuman, Walker & Associates, Inc. – art direction, design
- Sue Austin – design coordinator
- Peter Nash – photography

Studios

- Recorded at Petty Sound Studios (Clovis, New Mexico); Rosewood Studio (Tyler, Texas); Midtown Tone & Volume and OmniSound (Nashville, Tennessee).
- Overdubbed at KD Studios (Nashville, Tennessee).
- Mixed at Masterfonics (Nashville, Tennessee); Petty Sound Studios; Rosewood Studio.
- Mastered at Masterfonics

== Charts ==
=== Weekly charts ===
Weekly chart performance for Blue
Chart (1996)	Peak position
Australian Albums (ARIA)	5
Canada Top Albums/CDs (RPM)	20
Canadian Country Albums (RPM)	1
New Zealand Albums (RMNZ)	10
UK Albums (Official Charts)	99
UK Country Albums (Official Charts)	1
US Billboard 200	3
US Top Country Albums (Billboard)	1
US Top Christian Albums (Billboard)	1

=== Decade-end chart ===
Decade-end chart performance for Blue
Chart (1990–1999)	Position
US Billboard 200	41

=== Year-end charts ===
1996 year-end chart performance for Blue
Chart (1996)	Position
Australian Albums (ARIA)	24
Canadian Country Albums (RPM)	6
US Billboard 200	33
US Top Country Albums (Billboard)	4

1997 year-end chart performance for Blue
Chart (1997)	Position
Australian Albums (ARIA)	90
Canadian Country Albums (RPM)	2
US Billboard 200	6
US Top Country Albums (Billboard)	1

1998 year-end chart performance for Blue
Chart (1998)	Position
US Billboard 200	135
US Top Country Albums (Billboard)	16

== Certifications ==
Certifications for Blue
Region	Certification	Certified units/sales
Australia (ARIA)	2× Platinum	140,000^{^}
Canada (Music Canada)	3× Platinum	300,000^{^}
New Zealand (RMNZ)	Gold	7,500^{^}
United States (RIAA)	6× Platinum	5,993,000
^{^} Shipments figures based on certification alone.

== See also ==
- 1996 in music
