= I've Been Wrong Before =

Single by Deborah Allen

from the album Cheat the Night
- B-side: "Fool's Paradise"
- Released: December 1983
- Genre: Country
- Length: 3:01
- Label: RCA
- Songwriter(s): Deborah Allen, Rafe Van Hoy, Don Cook
- Producer(s): Rafe Van Hoy

Deborah Allen singles chronology
| "Baby I Lied" (1983) | "I've Been Wrong Before" (1983) | "I Hurt for You" (1984) |

"I've Been Wrong Before" is a song co-written and recorded by American country music artist Deborah Allen. It was released in December 1983 as the second single from her album Cheat the Night. The song reached #2 on the Billboard Hot Country Singles chart in April 1984 and #1 on the RPM Country Tracks chart in Canada. Allen wrote the song with Rafe Van Hoy and Don Cook.

== Chart performance ==
| Chart (1983–1984) | Peak position |
|---|---|
| US Hot Country Songs (Billboard) | 2 |
| Canadian RPM Country Tracks | 1 |
