= God Bless America =

1938 American patriotic song by Irving Berlin

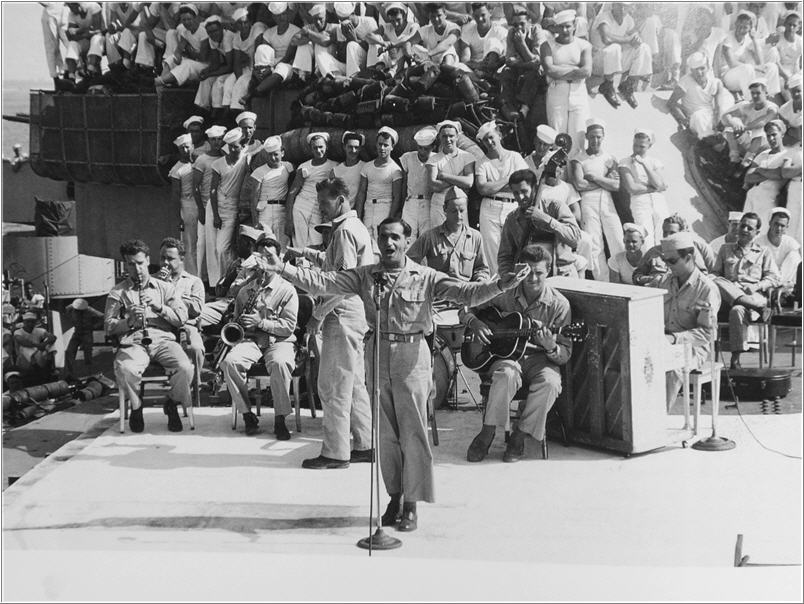
- Irving Berlin performing for sailors aboard the battleship USS Arkansas in 1944.

Song
- Written: 1918, 1938 (revised)
- Published: 1939 by Irving Berlin Inc.
- Released: March 3, 1939
- Genre: Patriotic song
- Songwriter: Irving Berlin

"God Bless America" is an American patriotic song written by Irving Berlin in 1918 and revised in 1938. The song is structured as a solemn prayer, asking for God's blessing and guidance for the United States. While originally written during World War I, it gained widespread popularity in 1938 when it was introduced as a "peace song" on an Armistice Day radio broadcast, sung by Kate Smith, who subsequently made it her signature song.

Over the decades, the song has become an enduring cultural staple, often cited as an unofficial national anthem of the United States. It has been a common feature at political and labor rallies, as well as sports events, most notably during the seventh-inning stretch at Major League Baseball games. Its history is marked by shifting societal interpretations: once a symbol of unity and religious tolerance in the 1940s, it was increasingly adopted by political conservatives during the 1960s to counter secular liberalism and anti-war sentiment.

The song has been covered by numerous artists, including Celine Dion and LeAnn Rimes, both of whom saw significant chart success with their versions following the September 11 attacks.

== History ==
Irving Berlin, an American Jew, wrote the song at the end of World War I while serving in the U.S. Army at Camp Upton in Yaphank, New York. He decided that it did not fit a planned revue titled Yip Yip Yaphank and set it aside. The early lyrics included the line "Make her victorious on land and foam, God bless America..." as well as "Stand beside her and guide her to the right with the light from above".

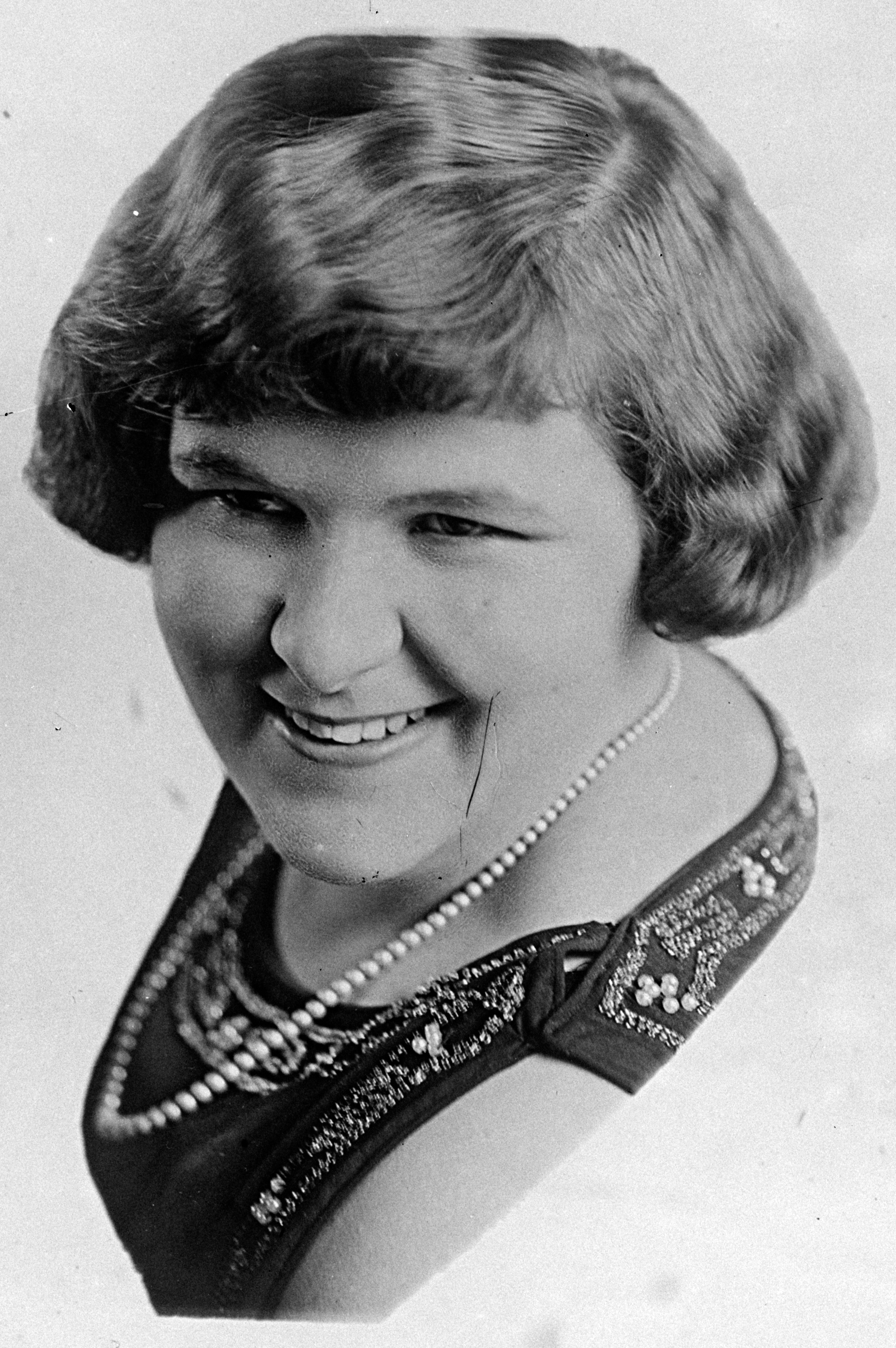
Kate Smith, 1930s

Music critic Jody Rosen has noted that a 1906 Jewish dialect novelty song, "When Mose with His Nose Leads the Band," contains a six-note fragment that is "instantly recognizable as the opening strains of 'God Bless America'". He interprets this as an example of Berlin's habit of interpolating fragments of earlier songs into his own work. Berlin, born Israel Baline, had himself written several Jewish-themed novelty songs.

In 1938, with the rise of Adolf Hitler, Berlin, who was Jewish and had arrived in the United States from Russia at the age of five, decided to revive the song as a "peace song". It was introduced on an Armistice Day broadcast in 1938, sung by Kate Smith on her radio program. The song became closely associated with Smith. Berlin made several changes to the lyrics; "to the right" was replaced with "through the night," and he added an introductory verse that Smith used in her performances: "While the storm clouds gather far across the sea / Let us swear allegiance to a land that's free / Let us all be grateful for a land so fair, / As we raise our voices in a solemn prayer." In her first broadcast, Smith sang "that we're far from there" instead of "for a land so fair". The published sheet music of March 1939 reflected the revised wording.

Woody Guthrie criticized the song, and in 1940 he wrote "This Land Is Your Land", originally titled "God Blessed America For Me," as a response. Antisemitic groups such as the Ku Klux Klan also protested the song because it was written by a Jewish immigrant.

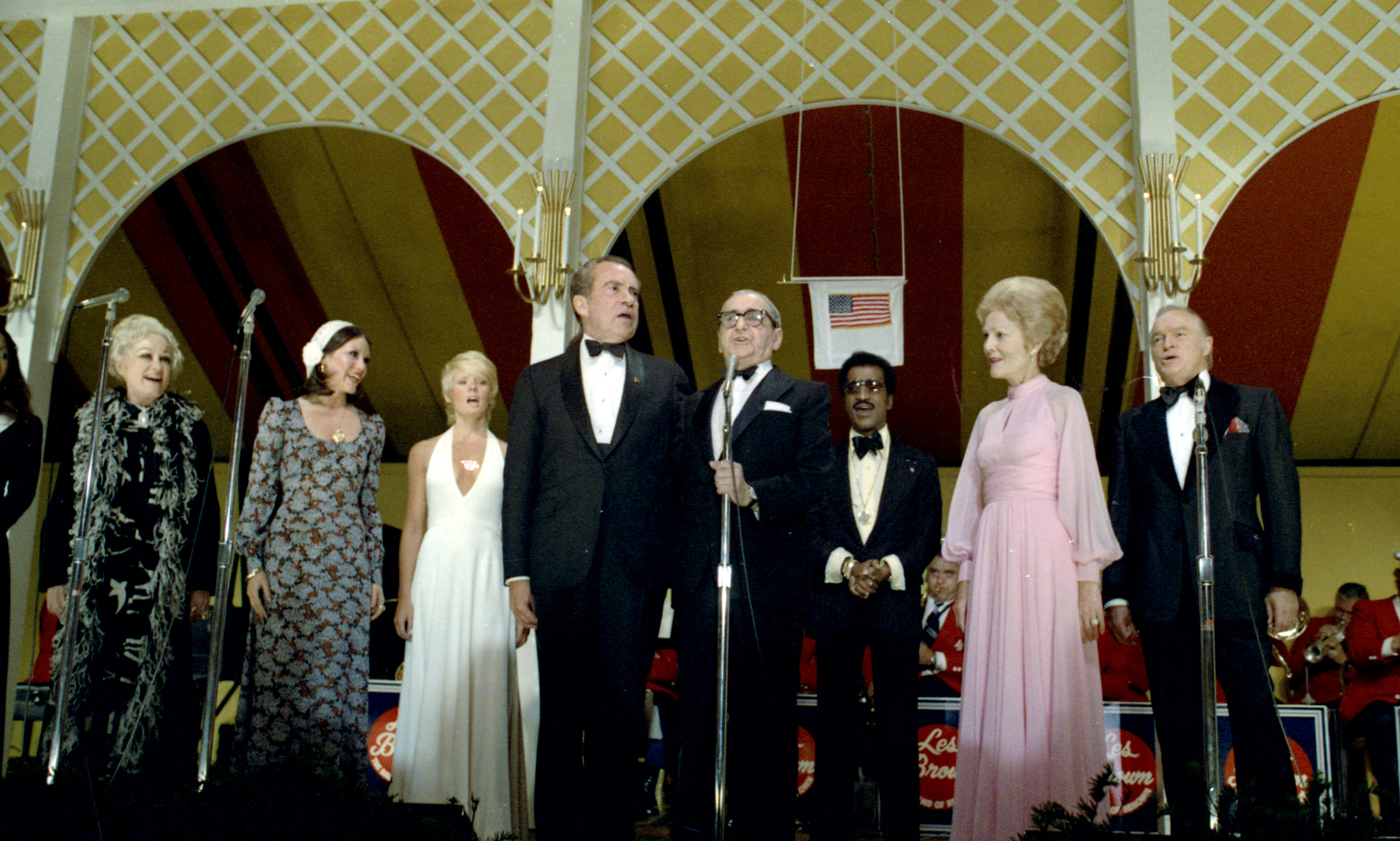
Irving Berlin sings "God Bless America" during the White House Vietnam POW Dinner (1973), joined by President Richard Nixon and others during the final line.

In 1943, Smith's rendition was featured in the patriotic musical film This Is the Army along with other Berlin songs. Manuscripts held by the Library of Congress document the song's evolution from a victory theme to a peace message. Berlin assigned the royalties to the God Bless America Fund for redistribution to the Boy Scouts and Girl Scouts in New York City. Smith performed the song on her two NBC television series in the 1950s. "God Bless America" also inspired another Berlin composition, "Heaven Watch The Philippines," written near the end of World War II after he heard Filipinos singing a modified version of the song that replaced "America" with "The Philippines."

The song was used early in the Civil Rights Movement and at labor rallies. During the 1960s counterculture, it was increasingly adopted by Christian conservatives in the United States as a response to secular liberalism and as a way to counter dissent related to communism and opposition to the U.S. involvement in the Vietnam War.

From December 11, 1969, through the early 1970s, Smith's recording was played before many home games of the National Hockey League's Philadelphia Flyers, gaining renewed popularity and a reputation as a "good luck charm" for the team. The Flyers invited Smith to perform live before game six of the 1974 Stanley Cup Final on May 19, 1974, and the Flyers won the championship that day.

== Lyrics ==
While the storm clouds gather far across the sea,
Let us swear allegiance to a land that's free.
Let us all be grateful for a land so fair,
As we raise our voices in a solemn prayer.

God bless America, land that I love.
Stand beside her and guide her
Through the night with the light from above.

From the mountains to the prairies,
To the oceans white with foam,
God bless America, my home sweet home,
God bless America, my home sweet home.

== Notable public performances ==
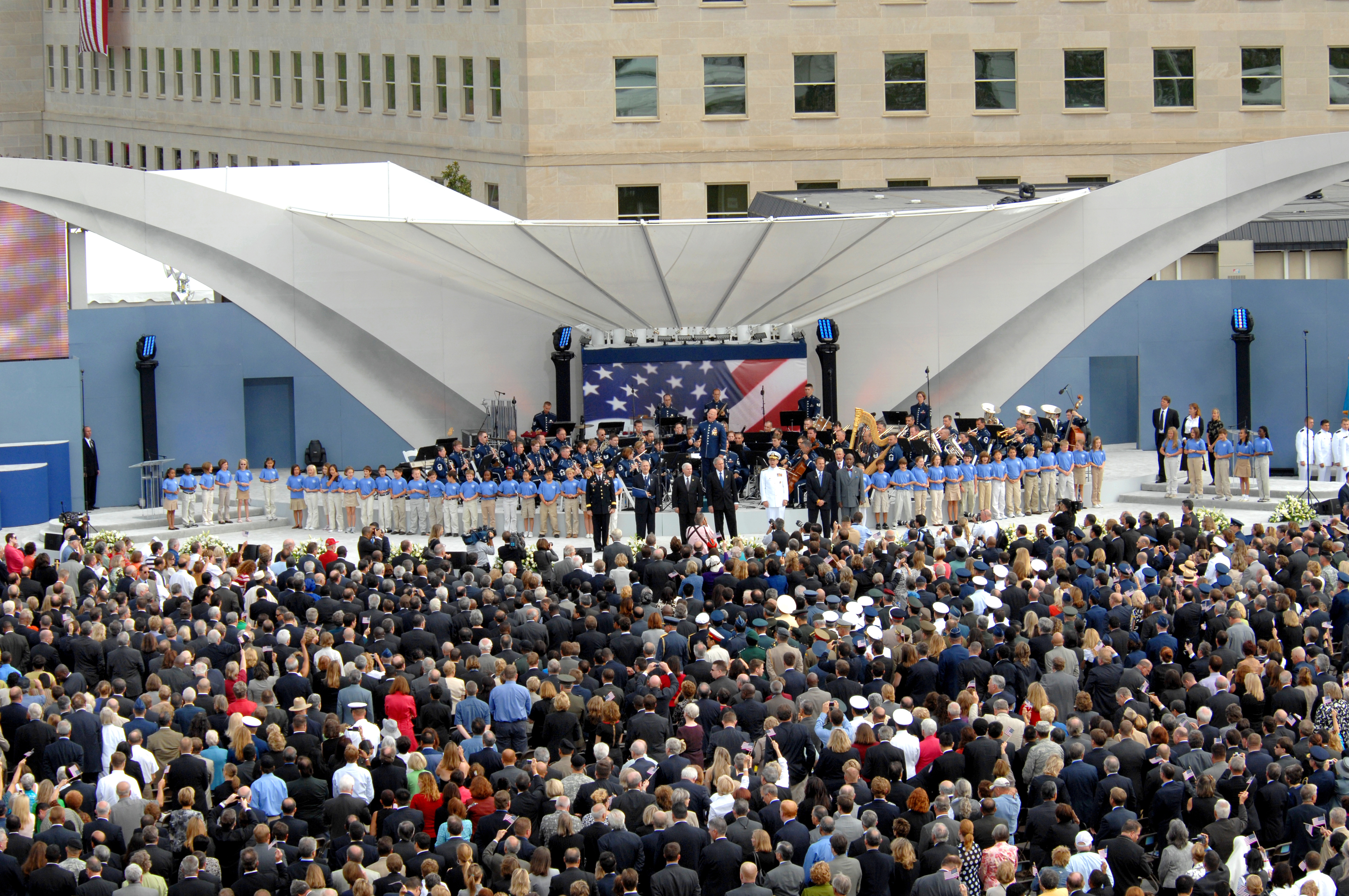
Singing "God Bless America" at the dedication of the Pentagon Memorial, September 11, 2008.

In 1940, "God Bless America" served as the official campaign song for both President Franklin Delano Roosevelt and his Republican opponent, Wendell Willkie. At the time, the song was associated with cultural and religious tolerance.

Irving Berlin performed the song on The Ed Sullivan Show on May 5, 1968, during an episode dedicated to him in honor of his 80th birthday.

During a live television broadcast on the evening of the September 11 terrorist attacks in 2001, members of the United States Congress sang "God Bless America" on the steps of the Capitol following remarks by Speaker Dennis Hastert and Senate Majority Leader Tom Daschle.

On July 21, 2011, Smith's recording was used as NASA's final wakeup call for Space Shuttle Atlantis (STS-135), marking the end of the 30-year Space Shuttle program.

=== Sports events ===
==== National Hockey League ====
"God Bless America" has been performed at home games of the National Hockey League's Philadelphia Flyers and at games of the Ottawa Senators when the visiting team is from the United States. The NHL requires arenas in both the U.S. and Canada to perform both "The Star-Spangled Banner" and "O Canada" at games involving teams from both countries.

At some Flyers home games, especially during major games and the playoffs, anthem singer Lauren Hart performed "God Bless America" alternating lyrics with Kate Smith on a video screen until 2019. In 2026, owing to the Flyers making the 2026 Stanley Cup playoffs, the song return sung only by without accompaniment by Smith. Smith also appeared in person at select Flyers games, including their 1974 Stanley Cup clinching game, where she received a strong ovation. Before performances of the song, PA announcer Lou Nolan would ask fans to rise and welcome Hart, "accompanied by the great Kate Smith".

At some Senators home games since 2000–01, anthem singer Lyndon Slewidge has performed both "God Bless America" and "O Canada" when the visiting team is from the United States. One example occurred during the Senators' home opener of the 2002–03 season against the New Jersey Devils.

During Tom Golisano's ownership of the Buffalo Sabres, the team occasionally substituted "God Bless America" for "The Star-Spangled Banner" at special events, with Ronan Tynan performing the song while Doug Allen sang "O Canada."

==== Major League Baseball ====
At Chicago's Wrigley Field during the Vietnam War, the song was often played by the organist as fans exited the stadium.

Since the September 11, 2001, terrorist attacks, the song has often been sung during the seventh-inning stretch in Major League Baseball games played in the US, particularly on Sundays, Opening Day, Memorial Day, Independence Day, the All-Star Game, Labor Day, September 11, and most postseason games. After the attacks, the San Diego Padres began using the song in place of "Take Me Out to the Ball Game", and Major League Baseball adopted the practice league-wide for the remainder of the season. Teams now decide individually when to play the song.

The New York Yankees are currently the only Major League club to play "God Bless America" at every home game during the seventh-inning stretch. The YES Network broadcasts the performance before commercial breaks. For major games, the Yankees often invite Irish tenor Ronan Tynan to perform the song.

In 2008, a fan at Yankee Stadium was removed by NYPD officers after attempting to leave his seat during the song; a subsequent lawsuit led the Yankees to end restrictions on fan movement during its performance.

In 2009, three high school students filed a lawsuit against the minor league Newark Bears after being ejected from a game for refusing to stand during the song.

==== American football ====
At the January 1, 1976, Rose Bowl, marking the start of the United States Bicentennial, Kate Smith performed "God Bless America" with the UCLA Band for a national television audience.

On January 26, 2003, during the player introductions at Super Bowl XXXVII in San Diego, Celine Dion, accompanied by the Tops in Blue and a military color guard, sang "God Bless America" in place of "America the Beautiful" before the Dixie Chicks performed the national anthem.

During the Super Bowl LI halftime show, a prerecorded introduction by Lady Gaga included both "God Bless America" and "This Land Is Your Land".

==== Indianapolis 500 ====
The Indianapolis 500, held annually at the end of May, has featured "God Bless America" since 2003. The song replaced "America the Beautiful" in the post-9/11 era. For many years it was performed by Florence Henderson, a native Hoosier and friend of the Hulman-George family, the track's owners. Her performance, often not televised, immediately preceded the national anthem, and she routinely sang the full song, including the prologue.

== Recorded versions ==
"God Bless America"

Single by Connie Francis
- B-side: "Among My Souvenirs"
- Released: 1959
- Recorded: 1959
- Genre: Patriotic song
- Length: 2:41
- Label: MGM
- Songwriter: Irving Berlin

Connie Francis singles chronology
"You're Gonna Miss Me" / "Plenty Good Lovin'" (1959)	"God Bless America" (1959)	"Mama" (1960)

Bing Crosby recorded the song on March 22, 1939, for Decca Records.

New York City police officer and tenor Daniel Rodríguez recorded the song as a single in 2001, and it charted for one week at number 99 on the Billboard Hot 100. Before the 2001 versions, the last time "God Bless America" had appeared on a Billboard chart was in 1959, when Connie Francis reached number 36 with her recording, issued as the B-side of her Top 10 hit "Among My Souvenirs".

On January 20, 2017, Jackie Evancho released Together We Stand, a disc containing three patriotic songs including "God Bless America". Her version reached number five on Billboard's Classical Digital Song Sales chart.

The Violent Femmes recorded "God Bless America" for their 2019 album Hotel Last Resort.

=== Celine Dion ===
"God Bless America"

Promotional single by Celine Dion

from the album God Bless America
- Released: September 2001
- Recorded: September 20, 2001
- Studio: Piccolo (Montreal)
- Genre: Patriotic song
- Length: 3:47
- Label: Epic
- Songwriter: Irving Berlin
- Producer: David Foster

Audio
- "God Bless America" on YouTube

On September 21, 2001, following the September 11 attacks, Canadian singer Celine Dion performed "God Bless America" during the television special America: A Tribute to Heroes. On October 16, 2001, Sony Music released the benefit album God Bless America, which includes Dion's recording. The album debuted at number one on the Billboard 200 and became the first charity album to reach the top of the chart since USA for Africa's We Are the World in 1985. Dion's version was issued as a promotional single in September 2001 and received enough airplay to reach number 14 on Billboard's Adult Contemporary chart. The accompanying music video also premiered in September 2001.

Dion performed the song several times in 2002. In 2003, she sang it at Super Bowl XXXVII. She also included it in her A New Day... residency on July 4, 2004.

Two versions of Dion's recording exist: a live performance and a studio version. Both were included on charity releases supporting victims of the September 11 attacks and their families. The live version appeared on the America: A Tribute to Heroes CD and DVD, released on December 4, 2001. The studio version was issued on the God Bless America album. It was recorded on September 20, 2001, one day before the telethon, as a contingency in case Dion was unable to appear. The track was produced by David Foster.

==== Weekly charts ====
Weekly chart performance
Chart (2001)	Peak position
Belgium Airplay (Ultratop Wallonia)	74
US Adult Contemporary (Billboard)	14
US Adult Contemporary (Radio & Records)	14

==== Year-end charts ====
Year-end chart performance
Chart (2001)	Position
US Adult Contemporary (Billboard)	50

=== LeAnn Rimes ===
"God Bless America"

Single by LeAnn Rimes

from the album God Bless America
- Released: October 16, 2001
- Genre: Patriotic song
- Length: 3:05
- Label: Curb
- Songwriter: Irving Berlin
- Producer: Wilbur C. Rimes

Audio
- "God Bless America" on YouTube

In 1997, American country music singer LeAnn Rimes recorded a cover of the song for her second studio album, You Light Up My Life: Inspirational Songs. After the September 11 attacks, Rimes rereleased the song on a compilation album of the same name. She also issued the song on a CD single. Two versions were released on October 16, 2001. Both featured "God Bless America" as the A-side, but with different B-sides: one paired it with "Put a Little Holiday in Your Heart", while the promotional version for radio included her rendition of "The National Anthem". Rimes's version reached number 51 on the Billboard's Country Songs chart on October 27, 2001.

==== Weekly charts ====
Chart performance
Chart (2001)	Peak position
US Hot Country Songs (Billboard)	51
US Top Country Singles Sales (Billboard)	3

== Parodies ==
The song has inspired numerous parodies.

- An irreverent version of the lyrics appeared in Frank Jacobs's 1972 book The Mad World of William M. Gaines. According to the account, Mad magazine art editor John Putnam submitted copy to the printers in which the word "America" was divided with a hyphen at the end of a line. The typesetting foreman returned it, explaining that his union prohibited splitting that word. Putnam rewrote the copy and enclosed the following verse:

Don't break "America";
Land we extol;
Don't deface it;
Upper-case it;
Keep it clean, keep it pure, keep it whole;
In Bodoni, in Futura,
In Old English, in Cabell [sic]—
Don't break "America"—
Or we'll—raise—hell!

- In "Temporarily Humboldt County" on The Firesign Theatre's 1968 album Waiting for the Electrician or Someone Like Him, a group of Native American men briefly and ironically sing "God bless Vespucciland..." to the tune of "God Bless America". The reference plays on the name of Italian explorer Amerigo Vespucci, whose first name is the source of the name "America".
- In the title track of their 1969 album How Can You Be in Two Places at Once When You're Not Anywhere at All, The Firesign Theatre briefly break into lines based on the song: "Ask the postman. Ask the mailman. Ask the milkman...white with foam."
- God Bless America, a 2011 film written and directed by Bobcat Goldthwait, uses the title ironically. The dark comedy follows a man and a teenage girl who embark on a killing spree targeting people they view as cruel or shallow.

== See also ==
- "America the Beautiful"
- "This Land Is Your Land"
