= One Way Ticket (Because I Can) =

Single by LeAnn Rimes

from the album Blue
- B-side: "Unchained Melody"
- Released: September 28, 1996
- Recorded: 1996
- Genre: Country pop
- Length: 3:42
- Label: Curb
- Songwriters: Keith Hinton; Judy Rodman
- Producers: Chuck Howard; Wilbur C. Rimes

LeAnn Rimes singles chronology
"Hurt Me" (1996)	"One Way Ticket (Because I Can)" (1996)	"Unchained Melody" (1996)

"One Way Ticket (Because I Can)" or simply "One Way Ticket" is a song written by Judy Rodman and Keith Hinton, and recorded by American country music artist LeAnn Rimes. It was released in September 1996 as the third single from the album Blue. The single made her the fourth teen-aged country music act to score a number one single on the U.S. Billboard country music charts. It is also her only number one country hit to date.

According to one of the producers present at the song's recording session, Rimes recorded her vocals in only one take.

== Music video ==
The music video was filmed in San Francisco, and shows Rimes singing with a microphone, and taking in the city. One scene shows her singing on top of a cable car. Other San Francisco landmarks shown include the Golden Gate Bridge, Fisherman's Wharf, and Lombard Street, where her main performance scenes were filmed.

== Critical reception ==
A review by Billboard stated "Less retro and traditional than her previous hit singles, Rimes' outing is a vibrant, uptempo number."

== Track listing ==
CD single

1. One Way Ticket (Because I Can) - 3:42
2. Unchained Melody - 3:51

== Chart performance ==
Chart (1996)	Peak position
Australia (ARIA)	52
Canada Country Singles (RPM)	4
US Hot Country Songs (Billboard)	1

=== Year-end charts ===
Chart (1997)	Position
Canada Country Tracks (RPM)	75
US Country Songs (Billboard)	74
