= Lipstick on Your Collar (song) =

- Cover of Swedish EP

Single by Connie Francis
- B-side: "Frankie"
- Released: May 1959
- Recorded: April 15, 1959
- Genre: Rock and roll
- Length: 2:16
- Label: MGM Records
- Songwriters: George Goehring, Edna Lewis
- Producer: Ray Ellis

Connie Francis singles chronology
"If I Didn't Care" (1959)	"Lipstick on Your Collar" / "Frankie" (1959)	"You're Gonna Miss Me" / "Plenty Good Lovin'" (1959)

"Lipstick on Your Collar" is a song written by Brill Building staff writers Edna Lewis (lyrics) and George Goehring (music) which was a 1959 hit single for Connie Francis. Francis' version climbed to the charts in the US, Canada, Australia, and the UK, while a German version by Cornelia Froboess (known as "Conny"), became a hit in Germany in early 1960.

== History ==
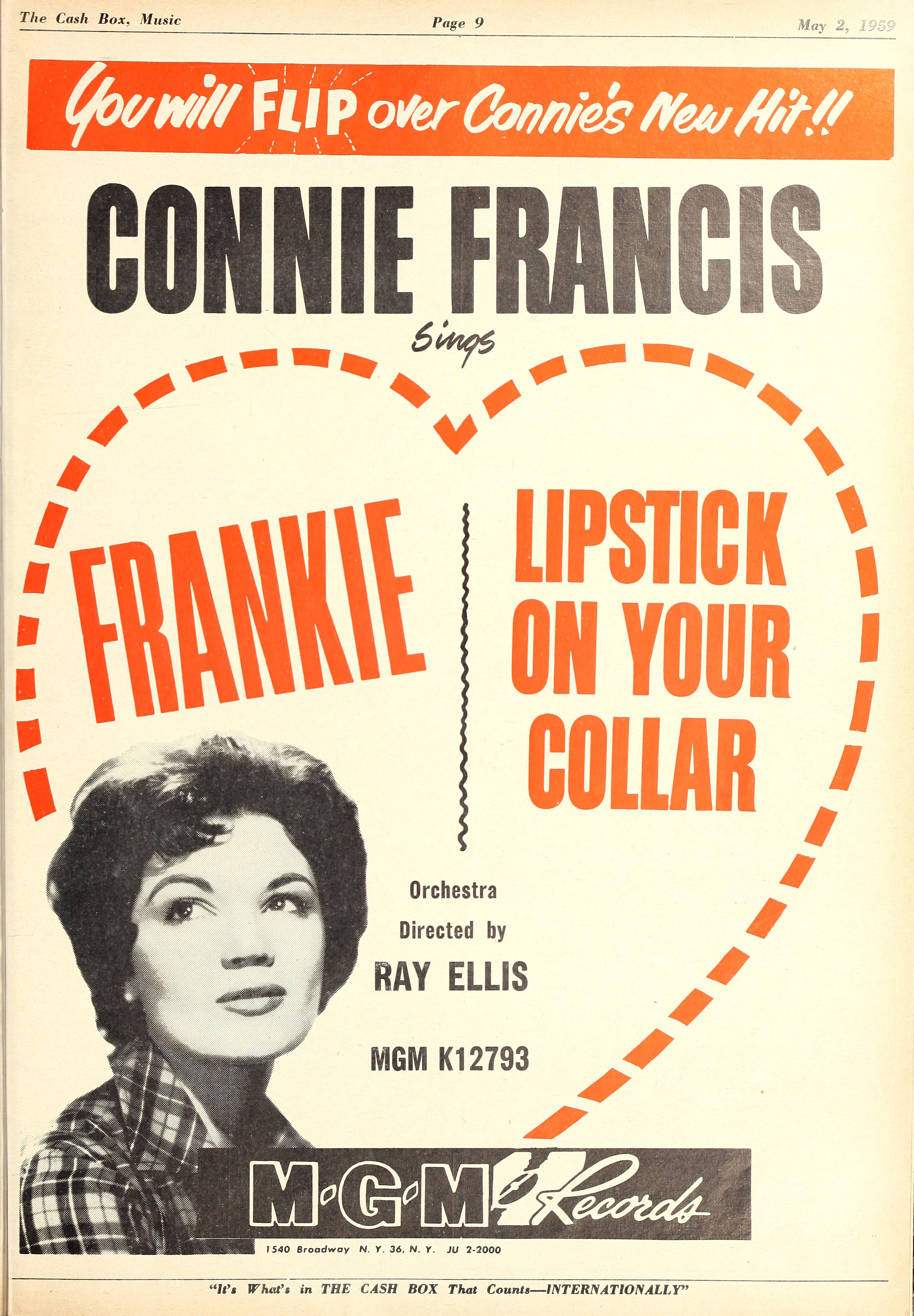
Advertisement featured in Cashbox magazine, 2 May 1959

In a 1959 interview, Connie Francis attributed her being the sole female singer then scoring rock and roll hits by saying: "Rock 'n' roll is a masculine kind of music" with its mindset of "'Come on out baby we're going to rock'...[best] suited for a man to sing...The mistake that many girl singers have made is trying to compete with the men [whereas] I've tried for the cute angle in lyrics, things like 'Lipstick on Your Collar' and 'Stupid Cupid'."

Songwriter George Goehring recalled in 1982 that he had personally pitched "Lipstick on Your Collar" to Francis, when he made an unannounced visit to her New Jersey home and played the song for her on her piano.

Francis recorded the song on April 15, 1959, in a session at Metropolitan Studio (NYC) produced and conducted by Ray Ellis, with veteran guitarist George Barnes contributing a solo to the track. At the same session Francis recorded the romantic ballad "Frankie", a Howard Greenfield/Neil Sedaka composition meant to appeal to Frankie Avalon fans. "Lipstick on Your Collar" was originally intended to serve as the B-side to "Frankie", but MGM Records and Francis herself were so pleased with the recording that the two tracks were both promoted equally.

The result was the most successful double-sided hit of Francis' career, as "Lipstick on Your Collar" – the first uptempo Connie Francis single to reach the US Top Ten – peaked at No. 5 on the Billboard Hot 100 in July 1959, while "Frankie" peaked at No. 9. "Lipstick on Your Collar" sold over one million copies in the US.

In the summer of 1959 "Lipstick on Your Collar" also reached No. 3 in the UK Singles Chart, and became Francis' first Top Ten hit in Australia at No. 4.

In Canada the two songs co-charted at No. 2 for two weeks.

== Cover versions ==
"Lipstick on Your Collar" was recorded in German by Conny as "Lippenstift am Jacket" which reached number 13 in Germany in April 1960 (the single was a double-sided hit with the Rex Gildo duet "Yes, My Darling"). It was the success of the German version of "Lipstick on Your Collar" that alerted Francis to her potential success singing her singles in other languages: she made her first foreign language recording, that being "Everybody's Somebody's Fool" in German, in April 1960.

== Other uses ==
In 1982 Wisk laundry detergent used an adaption of "Lipstick on Your Collar" as a jingle in a radio ad campaign celebrating the product's twenty-fifth anniversary. The lyrics for the jingle were composed by George Goehring, who had written the original song's music, but not its lyrics.

Connie Francis' version served as the theme song for the 1993 British television series Lipstick on Your Collar. This was, however, set during the Suez Crisis of 1956, three years before Francis' hit single.

The song was used in the off-Broadway musical The Marvelous Wonderettes (first opened 1999), a revue of 1950s and 1960s songs.
