= Trouble in Paradise (Deborah Allen album) =

Studio album by Deborah Allen
- Released: 1980
- Studio: Audio Media Recorders, Nashville, Tennessee
- Genre: Country pop
- Length: 34:36
- Label: Capitol
- Producer: Steve Gibson

Deborah Allen chronology
Trouble in Paradise (1980)	Cheat the Night (1982)

Trouble in Paradise is a 1980 album by Deborah Allen and released by Capitol Records. This was Allen's first studio album and has never been released on CD. It was remastered and released on digital streaming and download platforms on July 11th, 2025.

== Track listing ==
All tracks are written by Deborah Allen and Rafe Van Hoy; except where indicated.

Side one
No.	Title	Writer(s)	Length
1.	"Nobody's Fool"	Deborah Allen, Rafe Van Hoy, Don Cook	3:39
2.	"If I Had Known Then"		3:13
3.	"Don't Stop Lovin' Me"		3:31
4.	"It's Cold Inside"	Deborah Allen, Freida Parton	3:29
5.	"Bells"	Deborah Allen, Rafe Van Hoy, Mitch Humphries	3:45

Side two
No.	Title	Writer(s)	Length
6.	"Trouble in Paradise"	Deborah Allen, Mitch Humphries	3:59
7.	"You Never Cross My Mind"	Deborah Allen, Rafe Van Hoy, Curly Putman	2:58
8.	"Let Me Down"		3:15
9.	"The Rest of the Way"	Deborah Allen, Sparky Lawrence	3:26
10.	"Next to You"	Deborah Allen	3:21
Total length:			34:36

== Personnel ==
- Deborah Allen - lead vocals
- Steve Gibson - electric guitar, acoustic guitar, sitar
- Rafe Van Hoy - electric guitar, acoustic guitar
- Paul Worley - electric guitar
- Leland Sklar - bass guitar
- Byrd Burton - steel guitar
- Bobby Ogdin - piano, organ
- Mitch Humphries - piano
- Eddie Bayers - drums, percussion
- Bill Jones - saxophone
- Sheldon Kurland Strings - strings

Technical

- Marshall Morgan - recording, mixing
- Eric Wrobbel - art direction
- Wood Newton - cover photography

- Track information and credits taken from the album's liner notes.
