= Delta Dreamland =

Studio album by Deborah Allen
- Released: February 1993
- Genre: Country pop
- Length: 42:20
- Label: Giant
- Producer: Rafe Van Hoy; Deborah Allen

Deborah Allen chronology
Telepathy (1987)	Delta Dreamland (1993)	All That I Am (1994)

Professional ratings
Review scores
Source	Rating
Allmusic	4.5/5 stars

Delta Dreamland is the fourth album by Deborah Allen and released by Giant Records. This 1993 album marked the return of Allen as a singer as her last album was released in 1987. Lead single "Rock Me (In the Cradle of Love)" charted on Hot Country Songs.

== Track listing ==
All tracks are written by Deborah Allen and Rafe Van Hoy, except where noted.

No.	Title	Writer(s)	Length
1.	"Delta Dreamland"		4:21
2.	"Long Time Lovin' You"	Deborah Allen, Rafe Van Hoy, Larry Henley	3:09
3.	"All the Loving and the Hurting Too"		3:54
4.	"Emotional Moon"	Allen	2:42
5.	"Two Shades of Blue"	Allen, Van Hoy, Bobby Braddock	2:59
6.	"Rock Me (in the Cradle of Love)"		4:07
7.	"Chain Lightning"	Allen, Van Hoy, Billy Burnette	3:28
8.	"If You're Not Gonna Love Me"	Allen, Van Hoy, Mark Collie	4:40
9.	"Undeniable"		4:22
10.	"Into My Life"	Allen, Van Hoy, Braddock	4:13
11.	"Rock Me" (Dance Mix)		4:25
Total length:			42:20

- Track information and credits taken from the album's liner notes.

== Personnel ==
- Deborah Allen - lead vocals, synthesizer
- Bill Cuomo - keyboards, organ, synthesizers, strings
- Billy Burnette - electric guitar
- Brent Mason - electric guitar
- Dan Dugmore - steel guitar
- Dann Huff - electric guitar
- Glenn Worf - bass
- Lonnie Wilson - drums, cymbals, percussion, vocals
- Mike Henderson - dobro
- Rafe Van Hoy - electric guitar, acoustic guitar, bass, drums, keyboards, vocals
- Steve Nathan - keyboards
- Tommy Spurlock - steel guitar
- Vicki Hampton - vocals
- Weldon Myrick - steel guitar

== Production ==
- Produced by Deborah Allen and Rafe Van Hoy
- Engineers: Mike Bradley, Jon "JD" Dickson, Marshall Morgan, Toby Seay, Rafe Van Hoy
- Mixing: Marshall Morgan
- Editing: Don Cobb
- Mastering: Denny Purcell

== Chart performance ==
Chart (1993)	Peak position
U.S. Billboard Top Country Albums	55
