= Deborah Allen =

American country singer-songwriter (born 1953)

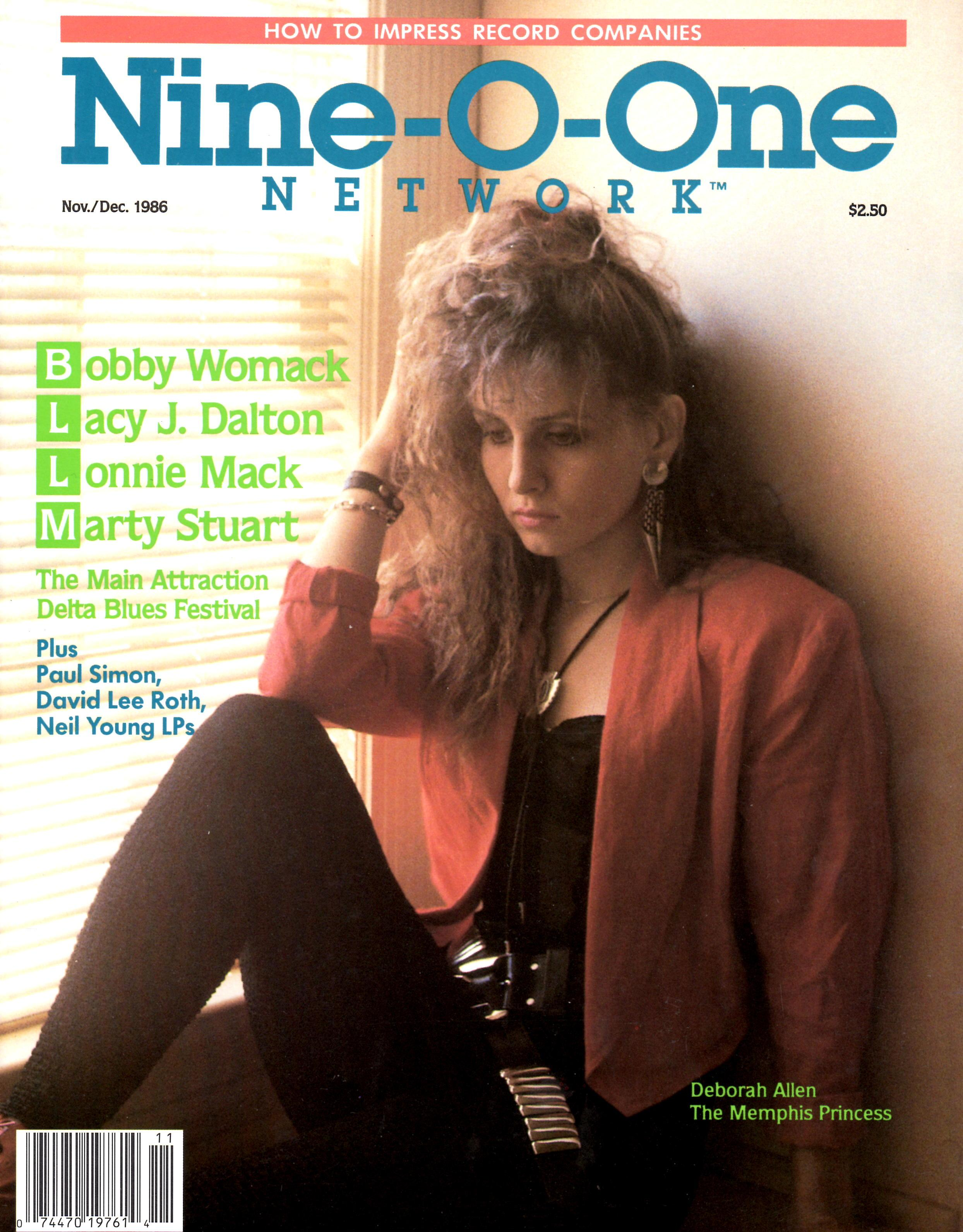
- Allen on the cover of NineOOne Network magazine in 1986
- Born: Deborah Lynn Thurmond; September 30, 1953 (age 72); Memphis, Tennessee
- Occupations: Singer-songwriter; guitarist
- Years active: 1979–present
- Known for: Baby I Lied; I've Been Wrong Before
- Spouses: Allen; Rafe Van Hoy (m. 1982–1993): Raymond Hicks
- Musical career
- Origin: Memphis, Tennessee, U.S.
- Genres: Country; country-soul; pop rock
- Instruments: Vocals; acoustic guitar
- Labels: Capitol Records; RCA Records; Giant Records; Curb Records; Southbound Sound Records; Delta Rock Records; Audium BFD Nashville

Deborah Allen (born Deborah Lynn Thurmond on September 30, 1953) is an American country music singer and songwriter. Since 1976, she has released 12 albums and charted 14 singles on the Billboard Hot Country Songs chart. She recorded the 1983 crossover hit "Baby I Lied", which reached No. 4 on the country chart and No. 26 on the Billboard Hot 100. Allen has also written No. 1 singles for herself, Janie Fricke, and John Conlee; top 5 hits for Patty Loveless and Tanya Tucker; and a top 10 hit for the Whites.

== Early life and rise to fame ==
Allen was born Deborah Lynn Thurmond in Memphis, Tennessee. She was a beauty queen when she was a teenager. Her early musical influences included Elvis Presley, Roy Orbison, Aretha Franklin, Al Green, Ray Charles, the Beatles, the Rolling Stones, Led Zeppelin and music played on Memphis stations WHBQ and WDIA; as well as Brenda Lee, Patsy Cline, Tammy Wynette, Dolly Parton, Willie Nelson, Waylon Jennings, and Johnny Cash, and other country musicians. At age 19, Allen moved to Nashville to begin pursuing a music career. She worked a short stint as a waitress at the IHOP on Music Row. While there one day, she met Orbison and songwriter Joe Melson. They admired her spunk and two weeks later, they decided to hire Allen to sing background vocals on a couple of Orbison tracks.

Allen auditioned for and landed a job at the Opryland USA theme park. She was soon chosen by Opryland as a featured soloist and dancer for a State Department exchange tour of Russia starring Tennessee Ernie Ford.

After returning from Russia, Allen gravitated to the Nashville offices of Waylon Jennings, the Glaser Brothers, and John Hartford, where her close friend, Marie Barrett, was a secretary. There Allen met Shel Silverstein, her soon-to-be songwriting mentor, the poet, playwright, artist and songwriter. After watching her perform at a happy hour show at Spence Manor on Nashville's Music Row, Silverstein advised Allen to pursue a songwriting career.

Allen's singing career received a boost when she was chosen to be a regular on Jim Stafford's summer replacement series on ABC. She went on to be an opening act on many of the star's personal appearances. Stafford and producer Phil Gernhard brought Allen back to Nashville to record a CB radio novelty record, "Do You Copy", which was recorded live and released as a single on Warner Bros. Records. Although she appreciated the opportunity to record with Stafford and Gernhard, Allen was disheartened that after waiting patiently for two years to make her first record, it was a novelty tune. She decided to move back to Nashville following her true musical direction.

In 1979, producer Bud Logan saw Allen singing at a private party, and invited her to sing on five unfinished duet tracks by the late Jim Reeves. Three of the duets, "Don't Let Me Cross Over", "Oh, How I Miss You Tonight" and "Take Me in Your Arms and Hold Me," were released as singles and made the top 10 on the country charts for Reeves' longtime label, RCA Records. She was billed as "The Mystery Singer" on the first release, an innovative promotion by label head Joe Galante.

== Career peak: 1980s ==
Allen signed with Capitol Records in 1980. Her debut album for the label in 1980, Trouble in Paradise, produced her initial solo hit "Nobody's Fool", peaking at No. 24 on the Billboard Country chart. Her subsequent (non-album) country chart singles "You (Make Me Wonder Why)", "You Look Like the One I Love" and "After Tonight" (co-written by Troy Seals) peaked at No. 20, No. 33, and No.82 respectively. Allen had written a song at the time called "Don't Worry 'Bout Me Baby" with Bruce Channel and Kieran Kane. Although she pleaded with Capitol to let her record it and release it as a single, the label refused. With the assistance of music publisher Don Gant, Janie Fricke's producer, Jim Ed Norman, heard "Don't Worry 'Bout Me Baby" and recorded it with Fricke. The single became Allen's first Billboard No. 1 single as a songwriter. By 1982, she had begun collaborating with songwriter Rafe Van Hoy and they married that year.

In 1983, Allen moved to RCA Records, finding success with her album Cheat the Night. The first single from the album, "Baby I Lied", became her signature song and her only crossover hit. It peaked at No. 4 on Billboard's Country chart and reached No. 26 on the Billboard Hot 100 in January 1984. The song also climbed into the top 10 of the Adult Contemporary chart. Allen followed the crossover hit with the country single "I've Been Wrong Before", which reached No. 1 on the Cashbox country chart and No. 2 on the Billboard Country chart in the spring of 1984. The song earned Grammy Award nominations for Best Country Song and Best Female Country Vocal Performance. "I Hurt for You", from Allen's breakthrough album, became a top 10 country hit in 1984. Her follow-up album in 1984, Let Me Be the First, was the first album digitally recorded in and released in Nashville. Allen made the charts once again in 1984 with "Heartache and a Half" (co-written with Van Hoy and Muscle Shoals songwriter Eddie Struzick).

In 1987, Allen released the single "Telepathy", written by Prince under the alias "Joey Coco". A more pop-oriented album of the same name was issued in the same year, and Allen released her last single for RCA, "You're the Kind of Trouble".

== 1990s–2000s ==
Allen co-wrote her No. 1 hit "Don't Worry 'Bout Me Baby" and wrote the Tanya Tucker hit "Can I See You Tonight", and earned further No. 1s for Janie Fricke ("Let's Stop Talking About It") and John Conlee ("I'm Only in It for the Love"), the latter a co-write with Kix Brooks and Van Hoy. After she co-produced and financed her album Delta Dreamland, Allen signed a contract with Giant Records to release the album in 1993. The first single, "Rock Me (In the Cradle of Love)", charted at No. 29 on the Billboard Country chart. The video for "Rock Me" was filmed on Allen's own 16 mm Arriflex SR camera and edited on her Sony editing machine, and won Allen the Music City Summit Award for co-producing and co-directing. Allen had one other charting single from Delta Dreamland, "If You're Not Gonna Love Me". Allen's 1994 album All That I Am, which she co-produced with Giant label head James Stroud, featured the single "Break These Chains".

Allen appeared as herself in the 1993 Peter Bogdanovich film The Thing Called Love, and performed "Blame It on Your Heart" and the Don Schlitz ballad "Ready and Waiting" on the film's soundtrack. Allen also signed a co-publishing deal and record deal with Curb music publishing and Curb Records in the 1990s. Her one album with Curb in 2000, The Best Of, included a new version of her 1983 hit "Baby I Lied". Five of Allen's songs were recorded by LeAnn Rimes – two appear on the multi-platinum album Blue and three on Sittin' on Top of the World. Mary Griffin's version of Allen's song "We Can Get There" appears in the film Coyote Ugly.

== 2010s–present ==
Allen's album Hear Me Now was released through Delta Rock Records and GMV Nashville on August 16, 2011. The first single was "Anything Other Than Love", co-written by Gary Burr. The album also contains Allen's song "Amazing Graceland", a tribute to Elvis Presley.

In 2013, she released her first holiday album, Rockin' Little Christmas, through Weblast Records, and played Christmas shows at the Fontanel Mansion in Nashville. On March 22, 2019, Bill Lee, the Governor of Tennessee, officially designated June 5, 2019, as a Day of Recognition to honor Allen. In 2021, Allen signed with a new record label, Audium/BFD Nashville. The first single, "Blue Collar Baby", was released in January 2022, followed by her first album for the label, The Art of Dreaming, on March 18, 2022.

Allen's publishing companies, Delta Queen Music and Delta Rose Music, are partnered with Delta Rock Music. She is represented by Raymond Hicks, her husband, of Rolling Thunder Management.

== Personal life ==
In a 2019 interview in Guitar Girl, Allen shared that she was physically abused by her first husband. She lives in Franklin, Tennessee. She and Raymond Hicks, a promoter and music producer are married. Allen is a Christian.

== Album discography ==
- Trouble in Paradise (1980)
- Cheat the Night (EP) (1983)
- Let Me Be the First (1984)
- Telepathy (1987)
- Delta Dreamland (1993)
- All That I Am (1994)
- Anthology (compilation) (1998)
- The Best of Deborah Allen (2000)
- Hands On (2000)
- Deb In the Raw (2000)
- Memphis Princess (2006)
- Hear Me Now (2011)
- Rockin' Little Christmas (2013)
- The Art of Dreaming (2022)
