= Jennifer Rush discography =

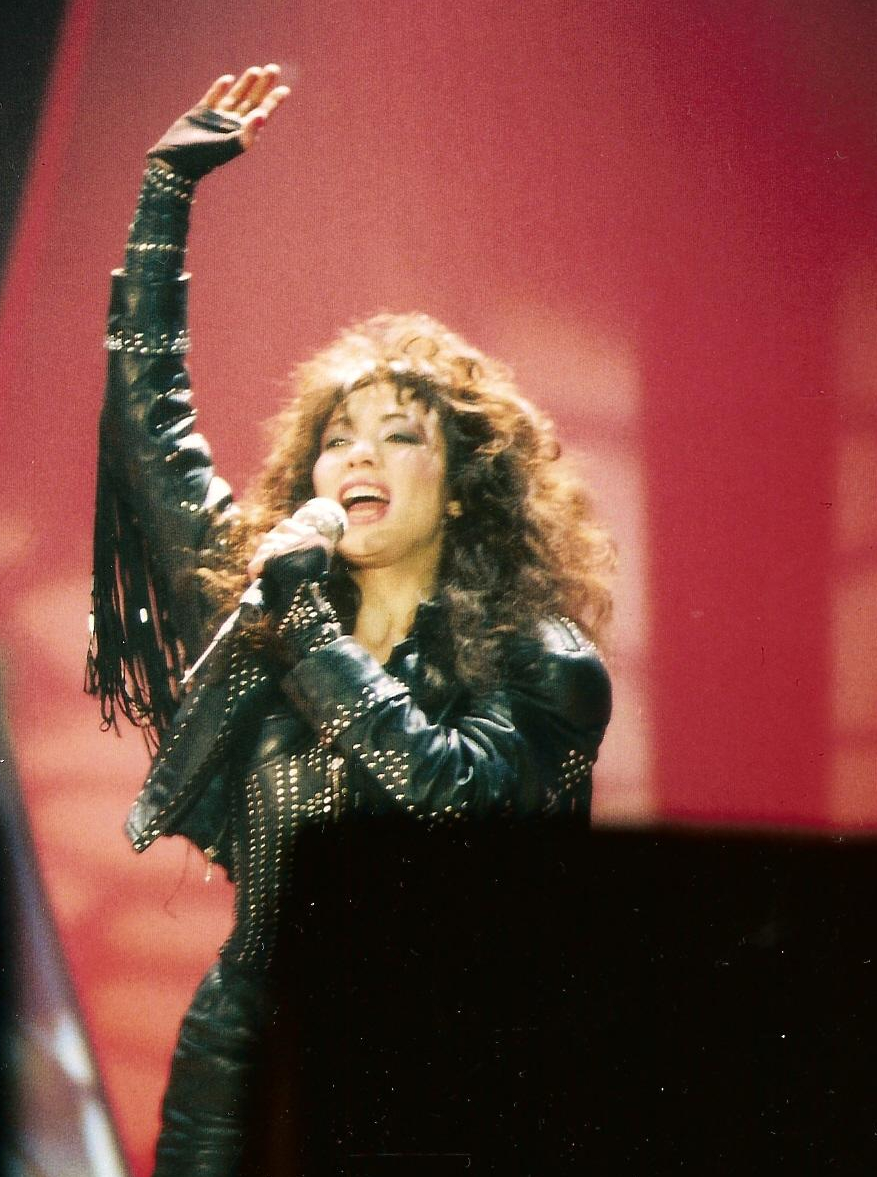
- Rush performing in 1987 promoting her "heart over mind" LP
- Studio albums: 11
- Compilation albums: 13
- Singles: 34
- Video albums: 1
- Music videos: 17

American singer Jennifer Rush has released eleven studio albums, thirteen compilation albums, and thirty-four singles.

== Career ==
Rush initially performed under her birth name Heidi Stern and released one studio album in 1979 which did not chart. In the early 1980s, she first signed with CBS Songs Publishing Germany as a songwriter, then to CBS Records and released her debut single "Tonight" in 1982, which also did not chart. In 1983, she changed her stage name to Jennifer Rush and released her first two singles "Into My Dreams" and "Come Give Me Your Hand" both co-written by Rush who at the time was working full time at the US Military in Munich, Germany. The following year, she made her chart breakthrough with her debut studio album, Jennifer Rush, which included the German top-40 singles "25 Lovers" and "Ring of Ice", as well as "The Power of Love", which topped several charts worldwide and became the best-selling single of 1985 in the United Kingdom and the most successful single of 1986 in Canada. The Jennifer Rush album reached top-10 positions worldwide and achieved platinum and multi-platinum certifications in Germany, Canada, New Zealand, Norway, Sweden and the United Kingdom.

In 1985, Rush released her second album, Movin', which topped the German Albums Chart for 13 consecutive weeks and was certified triple platinum. The album also topped the charts in Norway, Sweden and Switzerland, achieving a Platinum certification in the latter. Two singles were released from the album, "Destiny" and "If You're Ever Gonna Lose My Love", which reached the Top 10 and Top 30 on the German singles chart respectively. Rush's third album, Heart over Mind, was released in 1987 and was another chart-topping album in Germany, staying at the summit for nine consecutive weeks. Three German Top 40 hits were released from the album; "I Come Undone", "Flames of Paradise" (a duet with Elton John) and "Heart over Mind". The album reached the top 10 in multiple European territories, including Austria, Finland, Norway, Sweden, and Switzerland, where it became her second number-one album and her third platinum-certified album.

Rush's 1988 album Passion is her last platinum-certified album to date in Germany, peaking at number three and spawning a top-40 entry with "You're My One and Only". Her fifth album, 1989's Wings of Desire was less successful than her previous releases but attained a Top 20 peak in Germany and Switzerland, achieving a Gold certification in both countries. The same year, Rush achieved a UK top-40 entry with "Till I Loved You", a duet with Placido Domingo. The following year, CBS released Rush's first greatest hits album, The Power of Jennifer Rush, which reached number 40 in Germany and was eventually certified platinum.

In the 1990s, Rush signed with EMI and released four more studio albums during this decade. Her 1992 album Jennifer Rush reached the Top 40 in Germany and Switzerland but did not attain any certifications. Her next album, 1995's Out of My Hands, saw an improved chart performance, peaking at number 15 in Germany, becoming her highest-charting album of the decade in that country. The album also spawned her highest-charting 1990s single, "Tears in the Rain". 1997's Credo reached the top 30 in Germany, while 1998's Classics, a collection of classical re-recordings of Rush's 1980s singles with four new songs, peaked in the top 40.

Rush's eleventh studio album, Now Is the Hour, was released in 2010, becoming her highest-charting album in Germany since Out of My Hands.

== Albums ==
=== Studio albums ===
List of studio albums, with selected chart positions and certifications
Title	Details	Peak chart position										Certifications
Title	Details	US	AUS	AUT	CAN	FIN	GER	NOR	SWE	SWI	UK	Certifications
Heidi (as Heidi Stern)	Released: 1979; Label: Music Is Medicine; Formats: LP, CD	—	—	—	—	—	—	—	—	—	—	
Jennifer Rush	Released: March 2, 1984; Label: CBS; Formats: LP, CD, cassette	—	10	5	—	6	2	1	2	3	7	BPI: Platinum; BVMI: 2× Platinum; IFPI NOR: Platinum; IFPI SWI: Platinum
Movin'	Released: October 7, 1985; Label: CBS; Formats: LP, CD, cassette	—	96	8	—	9	1	1	1	1	32	BVMI: 3× Platinum; IFPI SWI: Platinum
Heart over Mind	Released: February 13, 1987; Label: CBS; Formats: LP, CD, cassette	118	—	9	33	7	1	6	4	1	48	BVMI: 2× Platinum; GLF: Platinum; IFPI SWI: Platinum; MC: Gold
Passion	Released: November 22, 1988; Label: CBS; Formats: LP, CD, cassette	—	124	24	—	14	3	—	10	4	—	BVMI: Platinum; IFPI SWI: Gold
Wings of Desire	Released: November 27, 1989; Label: CBS; Formats: LP, CD, cassette	—	—	—	—	37	12	—	18	13	—	BVMI: Gold; IFPI SWI: Gold
Jennifer Rush	Released: October 30, 1992; Label: EMI; Formats: LP, CD, cassette	—	—	40	—	—	35	—	—	38	—	
Out of My Hands	Released: February 9, 1995; Label: EMI; Formats: CD, cassette	—	—	30	—	—	15	—	—	28	—	
Credo	Released: March 24, 1997; Label: EMI; Formats: CD, cassette	—	—	37	—	—	26	—	—	—	—	
Classics	Released: November 9, 1998; Label: EMI; Formats: CD, cassette	—	—	—	—	—	34	—	—	—	—	
Now Is the Hour	Released: March 5, 2010; Label: Sony Music; Formats: CD, digital download	—	—	51	—	—	21	—	—	61	—	
"—" denotes a recording that did not chart or was not released in that territory.

=== Compilation albums ===
List of compilation albums, with selected chart positions and certifications
Title	Details	Peak chart position				Certifications
Title	Details	AUT	CAN	GER	SWI	Certifications
Jennifer Rush	Released: 1986; Label: CBS; Formats: LP, CD, cassette	—	9	—	—	MC: Platinum
The Power of Jennifer Rush	Released: 22 October 1991; Label: CBS; Formats: LP, CD, cassette	37	—	40	34	BVMI: Gold
The Best of Jennifer Rush	Released: 15 November 1999; Label: Columbia; Format: CD	—	—	—	—	
The Power of Love: The Best of Jennifer Rush	Released: 2000; Label: Columbia; Format: CD	—	—	—	—	
Premium Gold Collection	Released: 2000; Label: EMI; Format: CD	—	—	—	—	
The Hit Box	Released: 16 September 2002; Label: Sony Music; Format: 3-CD	—	—	—	—	
Superhits	Released: 18 May 2004; Label: Columbia; Format: CD	—	—	—	—	
The Power of Rush	Released: 2005; Label: Sony Music; Format: CD	—	—	—	—	
Stronghold – The Collector's Hit Box	Released: 31 August 2007; Label: Sony BMG; Format: 3-CD	—	—	—	—	
Hit Collection	Released: 2007; Label: Sony BMG; Format: CD	—	—	—	—	
The Very Best Of (The EMI/Virgin Years)	Released: 2010; Label: EMI; Format: CD, 2-CD	—	—	—	—	
The 80's Hit Box	Released: 2010; Label: Sony Music; Format: 3-CD	—	—	—	—	
Best of 1983-2010	Released: 2010; Label: Sony Music; Format: CD	—	—	—	—	
Original Album Classics	Released: 16 March 2018; Label: Columbia; Format: 5-CD	—	—	—	—	
"—" denotes a recording that did not chart or was not released in that territory.

== Singles ==
List of singles, with selected chart positions and certifications, showing year released and album name
Title	Year	Peak chart positions										Certifications	Album
Title	Year	US	AUS	AUT	CAN	FIN	GER	NZ	NOR	SWI	UK	Certifications	Album
"Tonight" (as Heidi Stern)	1982	—	—	—	—	—	—	—	—	—	—		Non-album single
"Into My Dreams"	1983	—	—	—	—	—	—	—	—	—	—		Jennifer Rush
"Come Give Me Your Hand"	1983	—	—	—	—	—	—	—	—	—	—		Jennifer Rush
"Witch Queen of New Orleans" (Note: Only released in Sweden.)	1983	—	—	—	—	—	—	—	—	—	—		Non-album single
"25 Lovers"	1984	—	—	—	—	—	25	—	—	—	—		Jennifer Rush
"Ring of Ice"	1984	—	—	—	—	15	22	—	—	—	14	BVMI: Gold	Jennifer Rush
"The Power of Love"	1985	57	1	1	1 (Note: "The Power of Love" also reached number one on the RPM Adult Contemporary chart.)	6	9 (Note: Originally peaked at number 16 in March 1985. The "Orchestral Remix" re-release peaked at number 9 in December 1985.)	1	1	3	1 (Note: Re-issued in 1986. This release peaked at number 55.)	ARIA: Gold; BPI: Platinum; MC: Gold; RMNZ: Gold	Jennifer Rush
"Destiny"	1985	—	—	5	—	—	4	—	—	5	96		Movin'
"Madonna's Eyes"	1986	—	—	—	—	—	—	—	—	—	84		Jennifer Rush
"If You're Ever Gonna Lose My Love"	1986	—	—	15	—	19	24	—	—	—	—		Movin'
"Live Wire" (Note: Only released in South Africa.)	1986	—	—	—	—	—	—	—	—	—	—		Movin'
"I Come Undone"	1987	—	—	28	—	11	11	—	—	9	94		Heart over Mind
"Flames of Paradise" (duet with Elton John)	1987	36 (Note: "Flames of Paradise" also peaked at number 32 on the Billboard Adult Contemporary chart.)	31	—	17 (Note: "Flames of Paradise" also peaked at number 15 on the RPM Adult Contemporary chart.)	—	8	14	—	7	59		Heart over Mind
"Heart over Mind"	1987	— (Note: "Heart over Mind" did not enter the Billboard Hot 100, but peaked at number 42 on the Billboard Dance Club Songs chart and number 33 on the Billboard Dance Singles Sales chart.)	—	24	—	—	25	—	—	29	—		Heart over Mind
"Another Way"	1988	—	—	—	—	—	—	—	—	—	—		Another Way: Original Motion Picture Soundtrack
"You're My One and Only"	1988	—	—	—	—	—	27	—	—	21	90		Passion
"Keep All the Fires Burning Bright"	1988	—	—	—	—	—	—	—	—	—	—		Passion
"Love Get Ready"	1989	—	—	—	—	—	—	—	—	—	—		Passion
"Till I Loved You" (duet with Placido Domingo)	1989	—	—	—	—	—	—	—	—	—	24		Goya: A Life in Song
"Higher Ground"	1989	—	—	27	—	—	54	—	—	—	98		Wings of Desire
"Wings of Desire"	1990	—	—	—	—	— (Note: "Wings of Desire" did not enter the Finnish singles sales chart but did peak at number 8 on the radio chart.)	—	—	—	—	—		Wings of Desire
"We Are the Strong"	1990	—	—	—	—	—	—	—	—	—	—		Willy Bogner's Fire, Ice & Dynamite: The Original Soundtrack
"Ave Maria (Survivors of a Different Kind)"	1991	—	—	—	—	—	—	—	—	—	—		The Power of Jennifer Rush
"Never Say Never"	1992	—	—	—	—	—	46	—	—	—	—		Jennifer Rush
"Vision of You"	1993	—	—	—	—	—	56	—	—	—	—		Jennifer Rush
"A Broken Heart"	1993	—	—	—	—	—	90	—	—	—	—		Jennifer Rush
"Tears in the Rain"	1995	—	—	—	—	—	45	—	—	26	—		Out of My Hands
"Out of My Hands"	1995	—	—	—	—	—	—	—	—	—	—		Out of My Hands
"Das Farbenspiel des Winds"	1995	—	—	—	—	—	80	—	—	—	—		Pocahontas: Film Soundtrack (Deutsche Originalversion)
"Credo"	1997	—	—	32	—	—	75	—	—	—	—		Credo
"Sweet Thing"	1997	—	—	—	—	—	—	—	—	—	—		Credo
"The End of a Journey"	1998	—	—	—	—	—	—	—	—	—	—		Classics
"Ring of Ice" (Classics version)	1999	—	—	—	—	—	—	—	—	—	—		Classics
"Before the Dawn"	2010	—	—	—	—	—	—	—	—	—	—		Now Is the Hour
"Echoes Love"	2010	—	—	—	—	—	—	—	—	—	—		Now Is the Hour
"Closer" (Dominic Ghanbar featuring Jennifer Rush)	2021	—	—	—	—	—	—	—	—	—	—		Non-album singles
"Ring of Ice" (Stereoact Remix)	2022	—	—	—	—	—	—	—	—	—	—		Non-album singles
"I Come Undone" (Stereoact Remix)	2025	—	—	—	—	—	—	—	—	—	—		Non-album singles
"—" denotes a recording that did not chart or was not released in that territory.

=== Promotional singles ===
Title	Year	Album	Ref.
"When I Look in Your Eyes"	1988	Passion	
"Who Wants to Live Forever" (with Brian May)	1995	Out of My Hands	
"Piano in the Dark"	1997	Credo	
"Si Tu Eres Mi Hombre"	1998	Classics	
"Sense & Sensibility"	1998	Non-album single	

== Videography ==
=== Video albums ===
- The Power of Love: The Complete Video Collection (28 June 2004)

=== Music videos ===
List of official music videos of songs by Jennifer Rush Titles with ‡ symbol were included on The Power of Love: The Complete Video Collection
Title	Year	Notes	Ref.
"25 Lovers"	1984	Uses edit of the original album mix.	
"Ring of Ice" (Version 1)	1985	Uses original album mix.	
"The Power of Love" (Version 1)	1985	Uses edit of the original album mix. Later re-dubbed with an edit of the Orchestral remix.	
"The Power of Love" (Version 2) ‡	1985	Uses edit of the international album mix.	
"Destiny" ‡	1985		
"Ring of Ice" (Version 2) ‡	1985	Uses international album mix.	
"Madonna's Eyes"	1986	Uses international album mix.	
"If You're Ever Gonna Lose My Love" ‡	1986		
"I Come Undone" ‡	1987		
"Flames of Paradise" (with Elton John) ‡	1987	Uses edit version. Directed by Nick Morris and produced by Fiona O'Mahoney for MGMM.	
"Heart over Mind" ‡	1987		
"You're My One and Only" ‡	1988		
"Love Get Ready" ‡	1989		
"Till I Loved You" (with Placido Domingo)	1989		
"Higher Ground" ‡	1989		
"Wings of Desire" ‡	1990		
"We are the Strong"	1990		
"Never Say Never"	1992		
"Tears in the Rain" ‡	1995	Uses edit version.	
"Out of My Hands" ‡	1995	Uses edit version.	
"Credo" ‡	1997	Uses edit version.	
"Echoes Love"	2010	Uses the Seduction(s) Radio Remix.	
