= The Power of Love: The Best of Jennifer Rush =

Compilation album by Jennifer Rush
- Released: 2000
- Label: Columbia

Jennifer Rush chronology
Classics (1998)	The Power of Love: The Best of Jennifer Rush (2000)	Stronghold – The Collector's Hit Box (2007)

The Power of Love: The Best of Jennifer Rush is a compilation album by American singer Jennifer Rush, released by Sony's Columbia Records in 2000. While it was the third full-priced compilation to be issued by Sony since Rush's departure from Columbia in 1989, it was the first to be handled by Sony U.K.

Sony Germany (who, as she was based in Germany, had handled all of Rush's releases during her tenure with the Columbia label) had previously released two full-priced compilation albums on Columbia of Rush's material: 1991's The Power of Jennifer Rush (released across Europe) and The Best of Jennifer Rush in 1999 (released to limited European markets and the South African market).

For this compilation, Sony U.K. focused on Rush's success in the United Kingdom, giving it the title of her biggest-selling hit there and opening the album with that song. The featured versions of "The Power of Love" and "Ring of Ice" (a top 20 U.K. hit for Rush and her second biggest hit there) are the mixes found on the 7" singles issued in that country (as remixed by Walter Samuel), rather than the original mixes found on the German 7" singles.

An expanded "anniversary edition" was released digitally on December 13, 2024. This edition adds the songs "Ave Maria (Survivors of a Different Kind)", "Come Give Me Your Hand", "Madonna's Eyes", "25 Lovers", "Wings of Desire", "Si Tu Eres Mi Hombre Y Yo Tu Mujer" (the Spanish version of "The Power of Love") and a remix of "Ring of Ice" by Stereoact, but removes the songs "Pleasure" and "Down to You" that appeared on the original edition.

== Track listing ==
=== Original release (2000) ===
The Power of Love: The Best of Jennifer Rush track listing – Colombia 498715 2
No.	Title	Writer(s)	Original album	Length
1.	"The Power of Love" (Walter Samuel U.K. 7" Remix)	Jennifer Rush; Mary Susan Applegate; Candy DeRouge; Gunther Mende	Jennifer Rush	4:28
2.	"Destiny"	Rush; DeRouge; Mende	Movin'	3:37
3.	"Flames of Paradise" (Duet with Elton John)	Bruce Roberts; Andy Goldmark	Heart Over Mind	4:42
4.	"Love is the Language (of the Heart)"	Rush; David Palmer	Wings of Desire	4:28
5.	"I Come Undone"	Ellen Shipley; Morrie Brown	Heart Over Mind	4:06
6.	"Ring of Ice" (Walter Samuel U.K. 7" Remix)	Rush; DeRouge; Mende	Jennifer Rush	3:51
7.	"Same Heart" (Duet with Michael Bolton)	Michael Bolton; Bob Halligan Jr.	Passion	4:17
8.	"If You're Ever Gonna Lose My Love"	Rush; DeRouge; Mende	Movin	3:48
9.	"Hero of a Fool" (U.S. Album Mix)	Rush; DeRouge; Mende; Applegate	Movin	3:39
10.	"Call My Name"	Bolton; Mark Radice; Rush	Heart Over Mind	4:14
11.	"Now That It's Over"	Bolton; Doug James	Passion	4:02
12.	"Keep All the Fires Burning Bright"	Rush; Harold Faltermeyer; Keith Forsey	Passion	4:53
13.	"Live Wire"	Rush; Tony Carey	Movin	3:51
14.	"Pleasure"	Jackie Rawe; Peter Adams	Wings of Desire	4:02
15.	"Angel"	Rush; Phil Ramone; Tomas Ledin	Wings of Desire	4:35
16.	"Down to You"	Rush; Desmond Child	Heart Over Mind	4:29
17.	"Till I Loved You" (Duet with Plácido Domingo)	Maury Yeston	Goya: A Life in Song (European edition)	4:23
Total length:				71:24

=== Expanded Anniversary Edition (2024) ===
Anniversary Edition
No.	Title	Writer(s)	Original album	Length
1.	"The Power of Love" (Walter Samuel U.K. 7" Remix)	Jennifer Rush; Mary Susan Applegate; Candy DeRouge; Gunther Mende	Jennifer Rush	4:28
2.	"Destiny"	Rush; DeRouge; Mende	Movin'	3:37
3.	"Flames of Paradise" (Duet with Elton John)	Bruce Roberts; Andy Goldmark	Heart Over Mind	4:42
4.	"Ave Maria (Survivors of a Different Kind)"	Rush; DeRouge; Mende; Applegate	Movin	3:47
5.	"I Come Undone"	Ellen Shipley; Morrie Brown	Heart Over Mind	4:06
6.	"Ring of Ice" (Walter Samuel U.K. 7" Remix)	Rush; DeRouge; Mende	Jennifer Rush	3:51
7.	"If You're Ever Gonna Lose My Love"	Rush; DeRouge; Mende	Movin	3:48
8.	"Come Give Me Your Hand"	Rush; DeRouge; Mende	Jennifer Rush	3:48
9.	"Same Heart" (Duet with Michael Bolton)	Michael Bolton; Bob Halligan Jr.	Passion	4:17
10.	"Hero of a Fool" (U.S. Album Mix)	Rush; DeRouge; Mende; Applegate	Movin	3:39
11.	"Madonna's Eyes" (Walter Samuel U.K. 7" Remix)	Rush; DeRouge; Mende; Applegate	Jennifer Rush	3:38
12.	"Live Wire"	Rush; Tony Carey	Movin	3:51
13.	"25 Lovers"	Rush; DeRouge; Mende	Jennifer Rush	3:36
14.	"Love is the Language (of the Heart)"	Rush; David Palmer	Wings of Desire	4:28
15.	"Call My Name"	Bolton; Mark Radice; Rush	Heart Over Mind	4:14
16.	"Now That It's Over"	Bolton; Doug James	Passion	4:02
17.	"Keep All the Fires Burning Bright"	Rush; Harold Faltermeyer; Keith Forsey	Passion	4:53
18.	"Angel"	Rush; Phil Ramone; Tomas Ledin	Wings of Desire	4:35
19.	"Heart Over Mind"	Taylor Rhodes; Tom Deluca	Heart Over Mind	4:07
20.	"Wings of Desire"	Amy Sky; Bruce Gaitsch	Wings of Desire	3:58
21.	"Till I Loved You" (Duet with Plácido Domingo)	Maury Yeston	Goya: A Life in Song (European edition)	4:23
22.	"Si Tu Eres Mi Hombre Y Yo Tu Mujer" (The Power of Love)	Luis Gómez-Escolar; Rush; Applegate; DeRouge; Mende	Jennifer Rush (Spanish edition)	5:17
23.	"Ring of Ice" (Stereoact Remix)	Rush; DeRouge; Mende		3:36
Total length:				94:41
