= Jennifer Rush (compilation album) =

Compilation album by Jennifer Rush
- Released: 1986
- Recorded: 1983–1985
- Genres: Pop; synth-pop; pop rock
- Label: Epic / CBS / Amiga

Jennifer Rush chronology
Movin' (1985)	Jennifer Rush (1986)	Heart over Mind (1987)

Singles from Jennifer Rush
- 1. "The Power of Love" Released: 1986; 2. "Si Tu Eres Mi Hombre Y Yo Tu Mujer" Released: 1986; 3. "Destiny" Released: 1986

Jennifer Rush is a compilation album released by American singer–songwriter Jennifer Rush in 1986. It was released in North America and other selected territories as her debut album in lieu of her first two studio albums Jennifer Rush and Movin'. The compilation reached the top 10 of the Canadian albums chart.

== Background ==
The album was released in certain countries in 1986, and served as her debut album in those territories. It contains a mixture of songs from Jennifer's first two albums Jennifer Rush and Movin' released in 1984 and 1985 respectively.

=== Singles ===
"The Power of Love" was the primary single released to promote the compilation. In the United States and Canada, the 7-inch single included a short version of the song with "I See a Shadow (Not a Fantasy)" on the b-side. While the song became a number 1 hit in Canada, it only reached number 57 in the United States.

In Ecuador, the Spanish-language version "Si Tu Eres Mi Hombre Y Yo Tu Mujer" was released as a single with the English-language version on the b-side.

"Destiny" was released as the second single in Canada, with "Hero of a Fool" on the b-side.

== Track listing ==
=== Standard edition ===
Track list, track lengths and credits taken from U.S. CD edition. This track list is the most common version used worldwide.

Jennifer Rush track listing
No.	Title	Writer(s)	Original album	Length
1.	"Destiny"	Jennifer Rush; Candy DeRouge; Gunther Mende	Movin	3:32
2.	"Live Wire"	Rush; Tony Carey	Movin	3:49
3.	"Into My Dreams"	Rush; DeRouge; Mende	Jennifer Rush	4:01
4.	"Automatic"	Mark Mangold; Suzanne Mangold	Movin	3:28
5.	"Hero of a Fool"	Rush; Mary Susan Applegate; DeRouge; Mende	Movin	3:37
6.	"Ring of Ice"	Rush; DeRouge; Mende	Jennifer Rush	3:49
7.	"Nobody Move"	Patrick Henderson; Richard Feldmann; Marcy Levy	Jennifer Rush	3:14
8.	"If You're Ever Gonna Lose My Love"	Rush; DeRouge; Mende	Movin	3:48
9.	"The Right Time Has Come Now"	Rush; DeRouge; Mende	Movin	4:01
10.	"The Power of Love"	Rush; Applegate; DeRouge; Mende	Jennifer Rush	5:44

Note:

- The Argentinian edition replaced "Hero of a Fool" with "Si Tu Eres Mi Hombre Y Yo Tu Mujer" (5:15), the Spanish-language re-recording of "The Power of Love", originally released in March 1986. All other tracks are same as the standard release.

=== Venezuelan edition ===
Venezuelan pressings remove the songs "Into My Dreams", "Nobody Move" and the English version of "The Power of Love". Four songs are added to the track list in their place, these being "Madonna's Eyes", "Yester-Me, Yester-You, Yesterday", "Ave Maria" and the Spanish-language version of "The Power of Love".

Jennifer Rush Venezuelan edition track listing
No.	Title	Writer(s)	Original album	Length
1.	"Destiny"	Jennifer Rush; Candy DeRouge; Gunther Mende	Movin	3:32
2.	"Madonna's Eyes"	Mary Susan Applegate; DeRouge; Mende	Jennifer Rush	3:30
3.	"Live Wire"	Rush; Tony Carey	Movin	3:49
4.	"Yester-Me, Yester-You, Yesterday"	Ronald Miller; Bryan Wells	Movin	3:15
5.	"Automatic"	Mark Mangold; Suzanne Mangold	Movin	3:28
6.	"Hero of a Fool"	Rush; Applegate; DeRouge; Mende	Movin	3:37
7.	"Ring of Ice"	Rush; DeRouge; Mende	Jennifer Rush	3:49
8.	"Ave Maria (Survivors of a Different Kind)"	Rush; Applegate; DeRouge; Mende	Movin	3:48
9.	"If You're Ever Gonna Lose My Love"	Rush; DeRouge; Mende	Movin	3:48
10.	"The Right Time Has Come Now"	Rush; DeRouge; Mende	Movin	4:01
11.	"The Power of Love (Si Tu Eres Mi Hombre Y Yo Tu Mujer)"	Rush; Applegate; DeRouge; Mende	Jennifer Rush	5:15

=== East Germany edition ===
Amiga released their own version of the compilation in 1987 in East Germany. This edition makes substantial changes to the track list, removing the songs "Into My Dreams", "Automatic", "Nobody Move" and "The Right Time Has Come Now", and adds the songs "Never Gonna Turn Back Again", "Madonna's Eyes", "Testify with My Heart", "25 Lovers", "Yester-Me, Yester-You, Yesterday" and "Come Give Me Your Hand". "The Power of Love" was also moved much earlier in the track list while "Hero of a Fool" was moved to the end.

Jennifer Rush East Germany edition track listing
No.	Title	Writer(s)	Original album	Length
1.	"Destiny"	Jennifer Rush; Candy DeRouge; Gunther Mende	Movin	3:32
2.	"Live Wire"	Rush; Tony Carey	Movin	3:49
3.	"The Power of Love"	Rush; Mary Susan Applegate; DeRouge; Mende	Jennifer Rush	6:00
4.	"Never Gonna Turn Back Again"	Rush; DeRouge; Mende	Jennifer Rush	3:28
5.	"Madonna's Eyes"	Applegate; DeRouge; Mende	Jennifer Rush	3:30
6.	"Testify with My Heart"	Rush; DeRouge; Mende	Movin	3:18
7.	"Ring of Ice"	Rush; DeRouge; Mende	Jennifer Rush	3:49
8.	"25 Lovers"	Rush; DeRouge; Mende	Jennifer Rush	3:37
9.	"If You're Ever Gonna Lose My Love"	Rush; DeRouge; Mende	Movin	3:48
10.	"Yester-Me, Yester-You, Yesterday"	Ronald Miller; Bryan Wells	Movin	3:15
11.	"Come Give Me Your Hand"	Rush; DeRouge; Mende	Jennifer Rush	3:49
12.	"Hero of a Fool"	Rush; Applegate; DeRouge; Mende	Movin	3:37

== Charts ==
=== Weekly charts ===
Chart performance for Jennifer Rush
Chart (1986)	Peak position
Canada Top Albums (RPM)	9

=== Year-end charts ===
1986 year-end chart performance for Jennifer Rush
Chart (1986)	Position
Canada Top Albums/CDs (RPM)	42

== Certifications ==
Region	Certification	Certified units/sales
Canada (Music Canada)	Platinum	100,000^{^}
^{^} Shipments figures based on certification alone.

== Release history ==
Country	Format	Label	Catalog
Argentina	LP	Discos CBS	120.751
Argentina	Cassette	Discos CBS	620.751
Canada	LP	Epic	FE 40291
Canada	Cassette	Epic	FET 40291
Canada	CD	Epic	WEK 40291
Ecuador	LP	CBS	333-0083
East Germany	LP	Amiga	8 56 247
East Germany	Cassette	Amiga	056 247
India	LP	Epic	FE 40291
South Africa	CD	Epic	CDEPC 3694 S
South Korea	LP	Epic	EK 40291
South Korea	Cassette	Epic	CPT 1077
South Korea	CD	Epic	CPK 1077
United States	LP	Epic	BFE 40291
United States	CD	Epic	EK 40291
United States	Cassette	Epic	PET 40291
Venezuela	LP	Epic	EPIC 309
