= Madonna's Eyes =

Single by Jennifer Rush

from the album Jennifer Rush
- B-side: "Surrender"
- Released: 17 February 1986 (UK)
- Length: 3:30
- Label: CBS
- Songwriters: Mary Susan Applegate (Lyrics); Candy DeRouge (Music); Gunther Mende (Music)
- Producers: Candy DeRouge; Gunther Mende

Jennifer Rush singles chronology
"Destiny" (1985)	"Madonna's Eyes" (1986)	"If You're Ever Gonna Lose My Love" (1986)

"Madonna's Eyes" is a 1984 song recorded by Jennifer Rush for her self-titled debut album. It was released as a single in the United Kingdom in February 1986.

== Background ==
"Madonna's Eyes" is the opening song of the Jennifer Rush album. The music was written and produced by Candy DeRouge and Gunther Mende, and the lyrics were written by Mary Susan Applegate, who had also co-written the lyrics of "The Power of Love" with Rush. "Madonna's Eyes" was remixed by Walter Samuel for the International version of the album, along with other singles "25 Lovers", "Ring of Ice" and "The Power of Love".

"Madonna's Eyes" was the third single from the album in the United Kingdom. It was initially planned for release in the week of 10 February 1986. But was delayed by a week and was released on 17 February 1986.

In Sweden it was released as a double A-side single with "If You're Ever Gonna Lose My Love" from Jennifer's second album Movin'.

== Commercial performance ==
Compared to Jennifer's previous two UK singles, "The Power of Love" and "Ring of Ice", which reached numbers 1 and 14 respectively, "Madonna's Eyes" performed poorly, only reaching number 84 and charting for three weeks in the Top 100.

It was more successful in South Africa on the Springbok Radio chart, where both "Ring of Ice" and "The Power of Love" had reached number 1, and "Madonna's Eyes" was able to reach a peak of number 12.

== Track listing ==
- 7-inch single (UK) – CBS A 6910
1. "Madonna's Eyes" (Walter Samuel Remix) – 3:30
2. "Surrender" – 3:15
- 12-inch maxi-single (UK) – CBS TA 6910
1. "Madonna's Eyes" (Extended Remix) – 5:15
2. "Surrender" – 3:15
- 7-inch single (South Africa) – SSC 5883
1. "Madonna's Eyes" (Walter Samuel Remix) – 3:30
2. "25 Lovers" (Walter Samuel Remix) – 3:27
- 7-inch single (Sweden) – CBS A 7041
1. "If You're Ever Gonna Lose My Love" – 3:50
2. "Madonna's Eyes" (Walter Samuel Remix) – 3:30
- 7-inch single (Costa Rica) – CBS 7012906
1. "Madonna's Eyes"
2. "Into My Dreams"

== Charts ==
Chart (1986)	Peak position
South Africa (Springbok Radio)	12
UK Singles (Official Charts)	84

== Release history ==
Release history
Region	Date	Label	Format	Cat. No.	Ref.
United Kingdom	February 17, 1986	CBS	7-inch; 12-inch	A6910; TA6910	
