= Destiny (Jennifer Rush song) =

- Continental European cover

Single by Jennifer Rush

from the album Movin'
- B-side: "The Right Time Has Come Now"; "Hero of a Fool"
- Released: September 1985
- Length: 3:35
- Label: CBS
- Songwriters: Jennifer Rush (Lyrics); Candy DeRouge (Lyrics and Music); Gunther Mende (Lyrics and Music)
- Producers: Candy DeRouge; Gunther Mende

Jennifer Rush singles chronology
"The Power of Love" (1985)	"Destiny" (1985)	"Madonna's Eyes" (1986)

"Destiny" is a 1985 song recorded by American singer-songwriter Jennifer Rush. It was the first single from her album Movin'. It was a top five hit in Austria, Switzerland and West Germany and remains Rush's highest charting single in Germany. It also reached the top 30 in Belgium and the Netherlands but only reached the lower end of the top 100 in the United Kingdom and failed to chart in Canada, where it was the second and final single from the self-titled 1986 compilation that served as her debut album in North America. It was not released in Australasia, where "If You're Ever Gonna Lose My Love" was released instead.

== Background ==
"Destiny" was co-written by Jennifer Rush with producers Candy DeRouge and Gunther Mende, who had previously produced her debut album and were co-writers on the Top 30 German hits "25 Lovers" and "Ring of Ice", as well as the worldwide hit "The Power of Love".

The song was re-recorded by Jennifer Rush for her 1998 album Classics.

== Track listings ==
- European 7-inch single
- South African 7-inch single
- U.K. 7-inch single
1. "Destiny" – 3:35
2. "The Right Time Has Come Now (Show Me Some Emotion)" – 4:01
- Canadian 7-inch single
1. "Destiny" – 3:35
2. "Hero of a Fool" – 3:38
- European 12-inch single
1. "Destiny" (Extended version) – 7:15
2. "The Right Time Has Come Now (Show Me Some Emotion)" – 4:01
3. "Destiny" – 3:35
- U.K. 12-inch single
1. "Destiny" (Extended version) – 7:15
2. "The Right Time Has Come Now (Show Me Some Emotion)" – 4:01

Notes

- A poster sleeve version of the 7-inch single was released in the United Kingdom.
- A picture disc version of the 12-inch single was released in the United Kingdom.
- The extended version was included on the 2007 box set Stronghold – The Collector's Hit Box.

== Charts ==
Chart (1985–1986)	Peak position
Austria (Ö3 Austria Top 40)	5
Belgium (Ultratop 50 Flanders)	24
Europarade Top 40 (Music Week)	15
European Top 100 Singles (Eurotipsheet)	68
Netherlands (Dutch Top 40)	19
Netherlands (Single Top 100)	23
Switzerland (Schweizer Hitparade)	5
UK Singles (Official Charts)	96
West Germany (GfK)	4

=== Year-end charts ===
Chart (1985)	Position
West Germany (Media Control)	74
Chart (1986)	Position
West Germany (Media Control)	38

== Release history ==
Release history
Region	Date	Label	Format	Cat. No.	Ref.
United Kingdom	April 7, 1986	CBS	7-inch; 12-inch	A6574; TA6574	
