= The Best of Celine Dion & David Foster =

2012 compilation album by Celine Dion

Compilation album by Celine Dion
- Released: 19 October 2012
- Recorded: 1993–2007
- Genre: Pop
- Length: 74:07
- Label: Columbia
- Producers: David Foster; Walter Afanasieff; René Angélil; Simon Franglen; Humberto Gatica; Tony Renis

Celine Dion chronology
Taking Chances World Tour: The Concert (2010)	The Best of Celine Dion & David Foster (2012)	Sans attendre (2012)

The Best of Celine Dion & David Foster is a compilation album by Canadian singer Celine Dion, released by Columbia Records in selected Asian countries on 19 October 2012. It includes songs produced by Grammy Award-winning Canadian record producer, composer, arranger, and musician David Foster, as well as a previously unreleased duet with Elvis Presley on "If I Can Dream".

== Content ==
This Asia-exclusive release marks 20 years of collaboration between Celine Dion and David Foster. The album was issued in countries such as the Philippines, Malaysia, Hong Kong, Taiwan, Indonesia, Thailand, South Korea, and China. It includes well-known songs such as "Because You Loved Me," "The Power of Love," "All by Myself," "Tell Him" (a duet with Barbra Streisand), and "To Love You More," along with the previously unreleased duet with Elvis Presley on "If I Can Dream".

The duet with Presley was created for Idol Gives Back, and Dion performed it with him on American Idol on 25 April 2007 using rotoscoping technology. The compilation also includes duets with Andrea Bocelli, Frank Sinatra, Luciano Pavarotti, and Clive Griffin. Three songs featured on the album were used in films: "Because You Loved Me" in Up Close & Personal, "When I Fall in Love" in Sleepless in Seattle, and "The Prayer" in Quest for Camelot. However, the album does not include any tracks from Unison (1990), for which Foster produced five songs.

The cover photograph was taken during an exclusive session with Dion and Foster at Caesars Palace in Las Vegas in October 2005. The shoot was conducted by photographer Jerry Metellus for NUVO magazine.

== Track listing ==
All tracks were produced by David Foster, except where noted.

No.	Title	Writer(s)	Producer(s)	Length
1.	"The Power of Love"	Gunther Mende; Candy DeRouge; Jennifer Rush; Mary Susan Applegate		5:41
2.	"All by Myself" (edited single version)	Eric Carmen; Sergei Rachmaninoff		4:01
3.	"When I Fall in Love" (with Clive Griffin)	Edward Heyman; Victor Young		4:19
4.	"The Colour of My Love"	Foster; Arthur Janov		3:24
5.	"What a Wonderful World"	George David Weiss; Bob Thiele		3:47
6.	"Because You Loved Me"	Diane Warren		4:33
7.	"The Prayer" (with Andrea Bocelli)	Carole Bayer Sager; Foster; Alberto Testa^{[a]}; Tony Renis^{[a]}	Foster; Renis^{[b]}; Sager^{[b]}	4:27
8.	"To Love You More"	Foster; Junior Miles		5:27
9.	"Tell Him" (with Barbra Streisand)	Linda Thompson; Walter Afanasieff; Foster	Foster; Afanasieff	4:50
10.	"All the Way" (with Frank Sinatra)	Jimmy Van Heusen; Sammy Cahn	Foster; René Angélil	3:52
11.	"I Surrender"	Louis Biancaniello; Sam Watters	Foster; Simon Franglen	4:51
12.	"The First Time Ever I Saw Your Face"	Ewan MacColl		4:06
13.	"If I Could"	Ken Hirsch; Marti Sharron; Ron Miller		4:46
14.	"I Hate You Then I Love You" (with Luciano Pavarotti)	Renis; Manuel de Falla; A. Testa; Fabio Testa; Norman Newell	Foster; Humberto Gatica; Renis	4:42
15.	"The Power of the Dream"	Foster; Babyface; Thompson	Foster; Babyface^{[b]}	4:30
16.	"If I Can Dream" (with Elvis Presley)	Walter Earl Brown		3:11
17.	"(You Make Me Feel Like) A Natural Woman"	Gerry Goffin; Carole King; Jerry Wexler		3:40
Total length:				74:07

=== Notes ===
- ^{^a} signifies an Italian translation
- ^{^b} signifies a co-producer

== Charts ==
Chart performance
Chart (2012)	Peak position
South Korean Albums (Circle)	38
South Korean International Albums (Circle)	9

== Release history ==
Release history
Region	Date	Label	Format	Catalog
Asia	19 October 2012	Columbia	CD	8 8725-44810-2 7
