= Stronghold – The Collector's Hit Box =

Compilation album by Jennifer Rush
- Released: August 31, 2007
- Recorded: 1982–1990
- Genre: Pop
- Length: 3:57:02
- Label: Sony BMG

Jennifer Rush chronology
Classics (1998)	Stronghold – The Collector's Hit Box (2007)	Now Is the Hour (2010)

Stronghold – The Collector's Hit Box is a compilation album by American singer Jennifer Rush. The album came as a 3 CD box set featuring single releases, album tracks, remixes and previously unreleased material.

== Background ==
The box set contains material Jennifer Rush recorded when signed to CBS Records International from 1982 to 1990. During this time she released five studio albums, Jennifer Rush (1984), Movin' (1985), Heart over Mind (1987), Passion (1988) and Wings of Desire (1989).

The set includes all extended versions that were released on German 12-inch singles from 1984 to 1989, as well as remixes that were released in the United Kingdom in 1985 and 1986. Rare songs include B-sides from early singles, standalone singles, soundtrack songs and four unreleased James Bond themes that Rush recorded in February 1984. As well as this, the album featured a new remix of her hit "I Come Undone" by Dave Kurtis, which received rave reviews among fans.

The box set was announced on Jennifer's official website on July 11, 2007. The box set was originally planned to also include material Jennifer recorded while signed to EMI and Virgin from 1992 to 1998, but this was not possible due to licensing reasons.

== Track listing ==
Disc One - Hits and Favourites Vol. 1
No.	Title	Album/Single	Length
1.	"Ave Maria (Survivors of a Different Kind)"	Movin	3:48
2.	"I Come Undone" (Extended version)	"I Come Undone" (12" single)	6:22
3.	"Into My Dreams"	Jennifer Rush	4:00
4.	"Destiny" (Extended version)	"Destiny" (12" single)	7:12
5.	"You're My One and Only" (Extended version)	"You're My One and Only" (12" & CD singles)	4:40
6.	"Call My Name"	Heart over Mind	4:15
7.	"Wings of Desire" (Extended version)	"Wings of Desire" (12" & CD singles)	5:44
8.	"Flames of Paradise (Duet with Elton John)" (Extended version)	"Flames of Paradise" (12" single)	5:39
9.	"Yester Me Yester You Yesterday" (Stevie Wonder cover)	Movin	3:15
10.	"Come Give Me Your Hand"	Jennifer Rush	3:49
11.	"Falling in Love"	Passion	3:59
12.	"Madonna's Eyes" (Extended version)	"Madonna's Eyes" (12" single)	5:21
13.	"Love Get Ready" (Extended version)	"Love Get Ready" (12" single)	6:04
14.	"Testify with My Heart"	Movin	3:18
15.	"Love is a Wild Thing"	Wings of Desire	4:41
16.	"The Power of Love" (Extended remix)	"The Power of Love" (U.K. 12" single)	7:12
Total length:			1:19:34

Disc Two - Hits and Favourites Vol. 2
No.	Title	Album/Single	Length
1.	"Stronghold"	Heart over Mind	4:23
2.	"25 Lovers"	Jennifer Rush	3:30
3.	"Heart Over Mind" (Extended version)	"Heart over Mind" (12" single)	6:25
4.	"If You're Ever Gonna Lose My Love" (Guitar mix)	"If You're Ever Gonna Lose My Love" (12" single)	7:15
5.	"Till I Loved You" (Duet with Plácido Domingo)	Goya: A Life in Song	4:20
6.	"We are the Strong" (Extended version)	"We are the Strong" (12" & CD singles)	5:33
7.	"Higher Ground" (Extended version)	"Higher Ground" (12" & CD singles)	6:28
8.	"Same Heart" (Duet with Michael Bolton)	Passion	4:15
9.	"Heart Wars"	Heart over Mind	3:13
10.	"Midnight Mirage"	Wings of Desire	4:15
11.	"Hero of a Fool" (U.S. Album Mix)	Movin	3:37
12.	"Keep All the Fires Burning Bright" (Extended version)	"Keep All the Fires Burning Bright" (12" & CD singles)	6:27
13.	"Down to You"	Heart over Mind	4:27
14.	"Ring of Ice" (Extended mix)	"Ring of Ice" (12" single)	6:18
15.	"When I Look in Your Eyes"	Passion	3:19
16.	"Where Can You Run"	Wings of Desire (CD bonus track)	3:20
Total length:			1:17:26

Disc Three - Specials and Rarities
No.	Title	Album/Single	Length
1.	"Tonight" (As Heidi Stern)	"Tonight" (Standalone single)	3:16
2.	"Listen (to What I Say)" (As Heidi Stern)	"Tonight" (B-Side)	1:46
3.	"Goldfinger" (Shirley Bassey cover)	Previously Unreleased	2:58
4.	"The Man with the Golden Gun" (Lulu cover)	Previously Unreleased	2:32
5.	"For Your Eyes Only" (Sheena Easton cover)	Previously Unreleased	3:03
6.	"Thunderball" (Tom Jones cover)	Previously Unreleased	3:01
7.	"Give Out"	"Into My Dreams" (B-Side) & "Ring of Ice" (German 12" single)	3:18
8.	"Witch Queen of New Orleans" (Redbone cover)	"Come Give Me Your Hand" (B-Side)	3:45
9.	"The Power of Love" (Radio Edit)	"The Power of Love" (7" Promo & 1995 CD re-release)	4:54
10.	"Ring of Ice" (Extended UK remix)	"Ring of Ice" (U.K. 12" single)	5:20
11.	"Heart Over Mind" (Single mix)	"Heart over Mind" (single)	4:04
12.	"Keep All the Fires Burning Bright" (Club mix)	"Keep All the Fires Burning Bright" (12" single)	6:42
13.	"Another Way" (Japan only single)	Another Way (Soundtrack)	4:30
14.	"We are the Strong" (Single version)	"We are the Strong" (single)	4:02
15.	"Si Tu Eres Mi Hombre Y Yo Tu Mujer" (The Power of Love)	Jennifer Rush (Spanish 1986 Reissue) & "The Power of Love" (Spanish single)	5:15
16.	"No Me Canso De Pensar En Ti" (If You're Ever Gonna Lose My Love)	Movin' (Spanish Edition) & "If You're Ever Gonna Lose My Love" (Spanish single)	4:00
17.	"Vida de Mi Vida" (You're My One and Only)	Passion (Spanish Edition) & "You're My One and Only" (Spanish single)	4:30
18.	"Solitaria Mujer" (Keep All the Fires Burning Bright)	Passion (Spanish Edition) & "Keep All the Fires Burning Bright" (Spanish single)	4:53
19.	"We are the Strong" (Soundtrack version)	Fire, Ice & Dynamite (Soundtrack)	5:29
20.	"I Come Undone" (Dave Kurtis remix 2007)	Previously Unreleased	3:21
Total length:			1:20:00
