= List of best-selling singles of the 1980s in the United Kingdom =

Singles are a type of music release that typically have fewer tracks than an extended play or an album. For the first three years of the 1980s the UK Singles Chart was compiled by the British Market Research Bureau (BMRB) who had been compiling the charts throughout the 1970s. On 8 January 1983 Gallup took over the compilation of the UK music charts and continued to provide the chart data for the next eleven years. The charts were produced from the sales data of a representative panel of around 500 record shops across the country. The "panel sales" data from each shop were sent to the chart compilers were taken from a panel of 250 different retail outlets every week and a multiplication factor of 17 was then applied to obtain an estimate of total sales across the country. Under the BMRB this sales data was posted to the chart compilers, but when Gallup took over they automated the system by installing computer terminals in the shops that registered each sale and sent the information to Gallup immediately.

The best-selling singles of the 1980s were compiled for Gallup by chart statisticians Alan Jones and Bob Macdonald. They were first revealed on BBC Radio 1 on 1 January 1990, with the "Top 80 of the 80s" counted down and played between 12:35 p.m. and 6:30 p.m. by DJs Alan Freeman and Mark Goodier. The top eighty best-selling singles of the decade were also printed in the music magazine Record Mirror in the issue dated 6 January 1990. However, in the following week's issue a correction was published stating that two singles had been omitted from the chart in error, caused by "computer storage problems at Gallup". The two singles were "Blue Monday" by New Order which should have been at number 13, and "Like a Virgin" by Madonna which should have been at number 53. The chart was then expanded to a top 100, including the two corrections, and published in Guinness Hits of the 80s later in 1990.

The 19 September 2009 issue of the UK music trade magazine Music Week included a special supplement to celebrate its 50th anniversary. It contained updated charts of the top twenty best-selling singles of each decade of the magazine's existence, based on the most recent information available from the Official Charts Company (OCC). The top twenty chart for the 1980s comprised the same twenty singles as the chart published in 1990, but "Blue Monday" was placed at number 12 and "Eye of the Tiger" at number 13.

The 1984 charity single "Do They Know It's Christmas?" by Band Aid was the best-selling single of the decade, and also became the biggest selling single of all time in the UK. It kept this title until 1997, when Elton John's "Candle in the Wind 1997"/"Something About the Way You Look Tonight" overtook it.

At number six is Wham! with "Last Christmas"/"Everything She Wants", which is the highest selling number two hit of the 1980s and was formerly the highest selling single not to top the chart (before it finally reached number one in 2021). In total, there were 20 non-number one singles in the Top 100 (eight of these in the bottom ten), including the biggest selling number three single "Blue Monday" by New Order.

Jennifer Rush at number nine with "The Power of Love" became the first female artist ever to have a million-selling single in the UK. Wham!, David Bowie, John Lennon and Adam and the Ants have three singles in the Top 100, while Frankie Goes to Hollywood, Stevie Wonder, Culture Club, Dexys Midnight Runners, Kylie Minogue, Lionel Richie, Madonna, Cliff Richard, Shakin' Stevens, Bucks Fizz, Michael Jackson, Ottawan and Paul McCartney all have two.

== Chart ==
No.	Title	Artist	Year	Peak position
1	"Do They Know It's Christmas?"	Band Aid	1984	1
2	"Relax"	Frankie Goes to Hollywood	1983	1
3	"I Just Called to Say I Love You"	Stevie Wonder	1984	1
4	"Two Tribes"	Frankie Goes to Hollywood	1984	1
5	"Don't You Want Me"	The Human League	1981	1
6	"Last Christmas"/"Everything She Wants"	Wham!	1984	2
7	"Karma Chameleon"	Culture Club	1983	1
8	"Careless Whisper"	George Michael	1984	1
9	"The Power of Love"	Jennifer Rush	1985	1
10	"Come On Eileen"	Dexys Midnight Runners & the Emerald Express	1982	1
11	"Tainted Love"	Soft Cell	1981	1
12	"Eye of the Tiger"	Survivor	1982	1
13	"Blue Monday"	New Order	1983	3 (Note: This is the highest position achieved by the "Blue Monday '88" remix in 1988. The original version of "Blue Monday" peaked at number 9 in 1983. Sales of the two versions were later combined.)
14	"Stand and Deliver"	Adam and the Ants	1981	1
15	"Especially for You"	Kylie Minogue and Jason Donovan	1988	1
16	"The Lion Sleeps Tonight"	Tight Fit	1982	1
17	"Fame"	Irene Cara	1982	1
18	"Ghostbusters"	Ray Parker, Jr.	1984	2
19	"Uptown Girl"	Billy Joel	1983	1
20	"Ride On Time"	Black Box	1989	1
21	"Swing the Mood"	Jive Bunny and the Mastermixers	1989	1
22	"Do You Really Want to Hurt Me"	Culture Club	1982	1
23	"Hello"	Lionel Richie	1984	1
24	"I Know Him So Well"	Elaine Paige and Barbara Dickson	1985	1
25	"Imagine"	John Lennon	1981 (Note: Originally released in 1975 and reached number 6; it was re-released in 1981 following Lennon's death.)	1
26	"Don't Stand So Close to Me"	The Police	1980	1
27	"Agadoo"	Black Lace	1984	2
28	"Woman in Love"	Barbra Streisand	1980	1
29	"Red Red Wine"	UB40	1983	1
30	"Antmusic"	Adam and the Ants	1980	2
31	"Into the Groove"	Madonna	1985	1
32	"Save Your Love"	Renée and Renato	1982	1
33	"Feels Like I'm in Love"	Kelly Marie	1980	1
34	"Pass the Dutchie"	Musical Youth	1982	1
35	"Never Gonna Give You Up"	Rick Astley	1987	1
36	"Prince Charming"	Adam and the Ants	1981	1
37	"Mistletoe and Wine"	Cliff Richard	1988	1
38	"Don't Leave Me This Way"	The Communards	1986	1
39	"I Don't Wanna Dance"	Eddy Grant	1982	1
40	"This Ole House"	Shakin' Stevens	1981	1
41	"The Land of Make Believe"	Bucks Fizz	1982	1
42	"Nothing's Gonna Stop Us Now"	Starship	1987	1
43	"Vienna"	Ultravox	1981	2
44	"Seven Tears"	Goombay Dance Band	1982	1
45	"Freedom"	Wham!	1984	1
46	"One Day in Your Life"	Michael Jackson	1981	1
47	"Making Your Mind Up"	Bucks Fizz	1981	1
48	"Super Trouper"	ABBA	1980	1
49	"The Birdie Song"	The Tweets	1981	2
50	"19"	Paul Hardcastle	1985	1
51	"Every Loser Wins"	Nick Berry	1986	1
52	"Shaddup You Face"	Joe Dolce Music Theatre	1981	1
53	"Like a Virgin"	Madonna	1985	3
54	"I Wanna Wake Up with You"	Boris Gardiner	1986	1
55	"Reet Petite"	Jackie Wilson	1986	1
56	"D.I.S.C.O."	Ottawan	1980	2
57	"Frankie"	Sister Sledge	1985	1
58	"I Want to Know What Love Is"	Foreigner	1984	1
59	"The Tide Is High"	Blondie	1980	1
60	"Let's Dance"	David Bowie	1983	1
61	"Total Eclipse of the Heart"	Bonnie Tyler	1983	1
62	"True"	Spandau Ballet	1983	1
63	"Chain Reaction"	Diana Ross	1986	1
64	"We All Stand Together"	Paul McCartney and the Frog Chorus	1984	3
65	"The Only Way Is Up"	Yazz and the Plastic Population	1988	1
66	"Living Doll"	Cliff Richard and The Young Ones featuring Hank Marvin	1986	1
67	"Ebony and Ivory"	Paul McCartney and Stevie Wonder	1982	1
68	"Only You"	The Flying Pickets	1983	1
69	"You Drive Me Crazy"	Shakin' Stevens	1981	2
70	"Wake Me Up Before You Go-Go"	Wham!	1984	1
71	"The Lady in Red"	Chris de Burgh	1986	1
72	"Geno"	Dexys Midnight Runners	1980	1
73	"Down Under"	Men at Work	1983	1
74	"Dancing in the Street"	David Bowie and Mick Jagger	1985	1
75	"Town Called Malice"/"Precious"	The Jam	1982	1
76	"I Should Be So Lucky"	Kylie Minogue	1988	1
77	"Together We Are Beautiful"	Fern Kinney	1980	1
78	"Coward of the County"	Kenny Rogers	1980	1
79	"I Feel for You"	Chaka Khan	1984	1
80	"Ghost Town"	The Specials	1981	1
81	"I Wanna Dance with Somebody (Who Loves Me)"	Whitney Houston	1987	1
82	"Move Closer"	Phyllis Nelson	1985	1
83	"(Just Like) Starting Over"	John Lennon	1980	1
84	"It's My Party"	Dave Stewart and Barbara Gaskin	1981	1
85	"Being with You"	Smokey Robinson	1981	1
86	"Working My Way Back to You"	The Detroit Spinners	1980	1
87	"When the Going Gets Tough, the Tough Get Going"	Billy Ocean	1986	1
88	"Billie Jean"	Michael Jackson	1983	1
89	"9 to 5"	Sheena Easton	1980	3
90	"A Good Heart"	Feargal Sharkey	1985	1
91	"Baggy Trousers"	Madness	1980	3
92	"Take On Me"	A-ha	1985	2
93	"Happy Birthday"	Altered Images	1981	2
94	"Hands Up (Give Me Your Heart)"	Ottawan	1981	3
95	"Ashes to Ashes"	David Bowie	1980	1
96	"Woman"	John Lennon	1981	1
97	"Love & Pride"	King	1985	2
98	"Golden Brown"	The Stranglers	1982	2
99	"All Night Long (All Night)"	Lionel Richie	1983	2
100	"Love of the Common People"	Paul Young	1983	2
