= Classics (Jennifer Rush album) =

Studio album by Jennifer Rush
- Released: November 6, 1998
- Label: Virgin
- Producer: Leslie Mándoki

Jennifer Rush chronology
Credo (1997)	Classics (1998)	Stronghold - The Collector's Hit Box (2007)

Singles from Classics
- 1. "The End of a Journey" Released: October 30, 1998; 2. "Ring of Ice" Released: 1999

Classics is the ninth studio album by American singer Jennifer Rush. Having been classically trained as a singer years earlier, Rush went back to her roots in Classics and recorded a selection of her past hits with the Hungarian Philharmonic Orchestra. These were vast reworkings of the songs, many of which had been originally uptempo pop tunes and were now slow and dramatic works, such as "Ring of Ice" and "I Come Undone". As well as these, four new songs were included on the collection, including the lead single, "The End of a Journey".

The album was released in several European countries, reaching number 34 on the German Albums Chart. The re-recorded version of "Ring of Ice" was released a year later as a promo-only single to coincide with her Classics tour. Rush undertook a tour with the Orchestra based on this album in 1999, which proved popular and appeared on several television shows, including on one occasion, in a duet with José Carreras. Classics remained Rush's last album for more than a decade, as she spent the next few years away from the business apart from occasional recordings on various soundtrack albums.

== Track listing ==
All tracks produced by Leslie Mándoki.

No.	Title	Writer(s)	Length
1.	"The End of a Journey"	Jennifer Rush; Laszlo Bencker; Mándoki	3:27
2.	"The Power of Love"	Rush; Gunther Mende; Candy DeRouge; Mary Susan Applegate	6:07
3.	"Ring of Ice"	Rush; Mende; DeRouge	3:50
4.	"Destiny"	Rush; Mende; DeRouge; M.D. Clinic	4:45
5.	"I Come Undone"	Ellen Shipley; Morrie Elliot Brown	3:59
6.	"All I Want Is You"	Rush; Bencker; Mándoki; Peter Zizzo	3:56
7.	"The Last Day of Summer"	Rush; Bencker; Mándoki	4:11
8.	"25 Lovers"	Rush; DeRouge; Mende	3:58
9.	"Heart over Mind"	Taylor Rhodes; Thomas de Luca	4:29
10.	"You'll Never Catch Me Dreaming"	Zizzo; Russ DeSalvo	4:20
11.	"Ave Maria"	Rush; DeRouge; Mende; Clinic; Applegate	5:09
12.	"Hero of a Fool"	Rush; DeRouge; Mende	4:08

Notes

- The Hungarian Edition includes a bonus track "Az Utazás Végén", a Hungarian version of "The End of a Journey".
- The Spanish Edition includes a Spanish version of "The Power of Love" titled "Si Tu Eres Mi Hombre", which is placed as the opening track on the album while the English version is placed as the final track (Track 13).

== Classics in Concert ==
Jennifer Rush toured in 1999 with the Hungarian National Philharmonic. Tour dates listed below:

Date	City	Country	Venue
10 April 1999	Nordhausen	Germany	Wiedigsburghalle
11 April 1999	Heilbronn	Germany	Harmonie
12 April 1999	Stuttgart	Germany	Liederhalle
14 April 1999	Munich	Germany	Circus Krone
15 April 1999	Mannheim	Germany	Mozarshaal
16 April 1999	Grefrath	Germany	Eissporthalle
17 April 1999	Frankfurt	Germany	Jahrhunderthalle
18 April 1999	Gera	Germany	Kultur- und Kongresszentrum Gera
20 April 1999	Lübeck	Germany	Musik- und Kongresshalle
21 April 1999	Magdeburg	Germany	Stadthalle Magdeburg
22 April 1999	Cottbus	Germany	Stadthalle Cottbus
23 April 1999	Braunschweig	Germany	Stadthalle Braunschweig
24 April 1999	Hamburg	Germany	Musikhalle
26 April 1999	Nuremberg	Germany	Meistersingerhalle
27 April 1999	Saarbrücken	Germany	Saarlandhalle
28 April 1999	Chemnitz	Germany	Stadthalle Chemnitz
29 April 1999	Berlin	Germany	Internationales Congress Centrum Berlin
30 April 1999	Leuna	Germany	Infraleuna
1 May 1999	Dresden	Germany	Kulturpalast

== Charts ==
Chart performance for Classics
Chart (1998)	Peak position
German Albums (Offizielle Top 100)	34
