= You're My One and Only =

Single by Jennifer Rush

from the album Passion
- B-side: "Rain Coming Down on Me"
- Released: October 1988
- Length: 3:40
- Label: CBS
- Songwriters: Marti Sharron; Chuck Wild
- Producers: Rich Tancredi; Ric Wake

Jennifer Rush singles chronology
"Another Way" (1988)	"You're My One and Only" (1988)	"Keep All the Fires Burning Bright" (1988)

Music video
- "You're My One and Only" on YouTube

"You're My One and Only" is a 1988 song recorded by American singer Jennifer Rush, which was released as the lead single from her fourth album Passion. The single reached the Top 30 of the singles charts in West Germany and Switzerland. A Spanish version titled "Vida De Mi Vida" was included on Spanish pressings of the Passion album.

== Track listings ==
- European 7-inch single
1. "You're My One and Only" – 3:40
2. "Rain Coming Down on Me" – 4:06
- European 12-inch single
1. "You're My One and Only" (Extended version) – 4:40
2. "Rain Coming Down on Me" – 4:06
3. "You're My One and Only" – 3:40
- European 3-inch CD single
1. "You're My One and Only" – 3:40
2. "Rain Coming Down on Me" – 4:06
3. "You're My One and Only" (Extended version) – 4:40
- Spanish 7-inch promo
1. "Vida De Mi Vida" – 4:30
- U.K. 12-inch single
1. "You're My One and Only" (Extended version) – 4:40
2. "The Power of Love" (Remix)^{[a]} – 4:20
3. "Rain Coming Down on Me" – 4:06
- U.K. CD single
1. "You're My One and Only" – 3:40
2. "You're My One and Only" (Extended version) – 4:40
3. "The Power of Love" (Remix)^{[a]} – 4:20
4. "Rain Coming Down on Me" – 4:06

Notes

- ^{^[a]} Remixed by Walter Samuel.
- The extended version and Spanish re-recording were both later included on the 2007 box set Stronghold – The Collector's Hit Box.

== Charts ==
Chart (1988)	Peak position
Eurochart Hot 100 Singles (Music & Media)	76
Switzerland (Schweizer Hitparade)	21
UK Singles (Official Charts)	90
West Germany (GfK)	27

== Release history ==
Region	Date	Label	Format(s)	Cat. No.	Ref.
United Kingdom	31 October 1988	CBS	7-inch; 12-inch; CD	6530437; 6530438; 6530432	
