= If You're Ever Gonna Lose My Love =

Single by Jennifer Rush

from the album Movin'
- B-side: "Testify with My Heart"; "Silent Killer"
- Released: March 1986
- Length: 3:50
- Label: CBS
- Songwriters: Jennifer Rush (Lyrics); Candy DeRouge (Lyrics and Music); Gunther Mende (Lyrics and Music)
- Producers: Candy DeRouge; Gunther Mende

Jennifer Rush singles chronology
"Madonna's Eyes" (1986)	"If You're Ever Gonna Lose My Love" (1986)	"I Come Undone" (1987)

Music video
- "If You're Ever Gonna Lose My Love" on YouTube

"If You're Ever Gonna Lose My Love" is a 1985 song recorded by American singer-songwriter Jennifer Rush. It was released in 1986 as the second single from her second album Movin'.

== Background ==
"If You're Ever Gonna Lose My Love" was co-written by Jennifer Rush, Candy DeRouge and Gunther Mende, who together wrote the majority of songs on Jennifer's first two albums. It was the last Jennifer Rush single to be produced by DeRouge and Mende.

A Spanish re-recording, titled "No Me Canso De Pensar En Ti", was released in 1986.

In Sweden, the single was issued as a double A-side with "Madonna's Eyes" from Jennifer's debut album.

== Track listings ==
- European 7-inch single
- Australia and New Zealand 7-inch single
- South Africa 7-inch single
1. "If You're Ever Gonna Lose My Love" – 3:50
2. "Testify with My Heart" – 3:18
- European 12-inch single
1. "If You're Ever Gonna Lose My Love" (Guitar Mix) – 7:15
2. "Silent Killer" – 3:34
3. "Testify with My Heart" – 3:18
- Sweden 7-inch single
1. "If You're Ever Gonna Lose My Love" – 3:50
2. "Madonna's Eyes" (Remix)^{[a]} – 3:38
- Spain 7-inch single (Re-issue)
1. "No Me Canso De Pensar En Ti" – 4:00
2. "Testify with My Heart" – 3:18
- Spain 12-inch single (Re-issue)
1. "No Me Canso De Pensar En Ti" – 4:00
2. "If You're Ever Gonna Lose My Love" – 3:50

Notes

- ^{^[a]} Remixed by Walter Samuel.
- Both the Guitar Mix and the Spanish version were included on the 2007 box set Stronghold – The Collector's Hit Box.

== Charts ==
Chart (1986)	Peak position
Austria (Ö3 Austria Top 40)	15
European Top 100 Singles (Eurotipsheet)	97
Finland (Suomen virallinen lista)	19
West Germany (GfK)	24
