= Heart over Mind (Jennifer Rush song) =

Single by Jennifer Rush

from the album Heart over Mind
- B-side: "Heart Wars"; "Love of a Stranger"
- Released: September 1987
- Length: 4:10
- Label: CBS
- Songwriters: Taylor Rhodes; Tom Deluca
- Producer: Harold Faltermeyer

Jennifer Rush singles chronology
"Flames of Paradise" (1987)	"Heart over Mind" (1987)	"Another Way" (1988)

Music video
- "Heart over Mind" on YouTube

"Heart over Mind" is a 1987 song recorded by American singer Jennifer Rush for her album of the same name. It was released as the third and final single from the album and achieved top 30 chart positions in Austria, West Germany and Switzerland.

== Background ==
"Heart over Mind" was written by Taylor Rhodes and Tom Deluca, and produced by Harold Faltermeyer, who also produced the songs "Search the Sky" and "Love of a Stranger" from the same album.

The song was released as the third single from the album in September 1987 in West Germany and Switzerland and in November 1987 in Austria. It was the album's second single in the United States following "Flames of Paradise". It was not released in the United Kingdom due to the poor performance of the first two singles in the country. It was however released in the United Kingdom as a b-side to one of two 12-inch releases of Rush's 1989 single "Keep All the Fires Burning Bright".

"Heart over Mind" was re-recorded by Jennifer Rush with the Hungarian National Philharmonic for her 1998 album Classics.

== Track listings ==
- European 7-inch single
1. "Heart over Mind" (Single Mix)^{[a]} – 4:09
2. "Heart Wars" – 3:17
- European 12-inch single
1. "Heart over Mind" (Extended Mix)^{[b]} – 6:26
2. "Heart Wars" – 3:17
3. "Heart over Mind" (Single Mix)^{[a]} – 4:09
- U.S. and Canadian 7-inch single
1. "Heart over Mind" (Single Mix)^{[a]} – 4:09
2. "Love of a Stranger" – 4:02
- U.S. and Canadian 12-inch single
1. "Heart over Mind" (Extended Mix)^{[b]} – 6:26
2. "Heart over Mind" (Single Mix)^{[a]} – 4:09
3. "Love of a Stranger" – 4:02

Notes

- ^{^{[a]}} remixed by Steve Thompson and Michael Barbiero.
- ^{^{[b]}} remixed by Brian Reeves.
- The single and extended mixes were both later included on the 2007 box set Stronghold – The Collector's Hit Box.
- The Remix service Disconet provided their own extended edit of the song (6:54) by Steven Von Blau in September 1987 in the United States.

== Charts ==
Chart (1987)	Peak position
Austria (Ö3 Austria Top 40)	24
Switzerland (Schweizer Hitparade)	29
US Dance Club Songs (Billboard)	42
US Dance Singles Sales (Billboard)	33
West Germany (GfK)	25
