= I Come Undone =

Promotional single by Ellen Shipley

from the album Call of the Wild
- Released: 1983
- Recorded: 1983
- Length: 3:58
- Label: Capitol Records
- Songwriters: Ellen Shipley; Morrie Brown

"I Come Undone" is a 1983 song co-written and performed by Ellen Shipley. The song was co-written with Morrie Brown and released on Shipley's third album Call of the Wild. It was released as a promotional single in the United States.

== Track listings ==
- U.S. 7-inch promo
1. "I Come Undone" – 3:45
2. "I Come Undone" – 3:45
- U.S. 12-inch promo
1. "Heart Out of Time" – 4:10
2. "I Come Undone" – 3:45

== Jennifer Rush version ==
"I Come Undone"

Single by Jennifer Rush

from the album Heart over Mind
- B-side: "Search the Sky"
- Released: February 1987
- Length: 4:06
- Label: CBS
- Songwriters: Ellen Shipley; Morrie Brown
- Producer: Desmond Child

Jennifer Rush singles chronology
"If You're Ever Gonna Lose My Love" (1986)	"I Come Undone" (1987)	"Flames of Paradise" (1987)

Music video
- "I Come Undone" on YouTube

American singer Jennifer Rush recorded a cover of "I Come Undone" for her third album Heart over Mind, released in 1987. The song was released as the lead single from the album. It reached the top 10 of the singles charts in Poland, South Africa and Switzerland, the top 20 in Finland and West Germany and the top 30 in Austria.

Jennifer re-recorded the song with the Hungarian National Philharmonic for her 1998 album Classics. A remix by Dave Kurtis as released in 2007 as part of the Stronghold – The Collector's Hit Box.

=== Track listings ===
- Europe 7-inch single
1. "I Come Undone" – 4:06
2. "Search the Sky" – 4:39
- Europe 12-inch single
1. "I Come Undone" (Extended version) – 6:23
2. "Search the Sky" – 4:39
3. "I Come Undone" – 4:06
- U.K. 12-inch single
1. "I Come Undone" (Extended version) – 6:23
2. "Search the Sky" – 4:39

Notes

- The extended version was later included on the 2007 box set Stronghold – The Collector's Hit Box.

=== Charts ===
Chart (1987)	Peak position
Austria (Ö3 Austria Top 40)	28
European Hot 100 Singles (Music & Media)	71
Finland (Suomen virallinen lista)	11
Poland (ZPAV)	2
South Africa (Springbok Radio)	10
Switzerland (Schweizer Hitparade)	9
UK Singles (Official Charts)	94
West Germany (GfK)	11

=== Release history ===
Region	Date	Label	Format(s)	Cat. No.	Ref.
United Kingdom	2 March 1987	CBS	7-inch; 12-inch	650380 7; 650380 6	
