= Passion (Jennifer Rush album) =

Studio album by Jennifer Rush
- Released: September 28, 1988
- Genres: Pop rock; adult contemporary
- Length: 45:26
- Label: CBS Records
- Producers: Harold Faltermeyer; Keith Forsey; Michael Omartian; Ric Wake; Jellybean

Jennifer Rush chronology
Heart over Mind (1987)	Passion (1988)	Wings of Desire (1989)

Singles from Passion
- 1. "You're My One and Only" Released: 1988; 2. "Keep All the Fires Burning Bright" Released: 1988; 3. "Love Get Ready" Released: 1989

Passion is the fourth studio album by American singer Jennifer Rush, released in September 1988.

== Background ==
Following on from the success of her previous album Heart over Mind, Rush continued working with much of the same team of writers and producers. She returned to working with Harold Faltermeyer as producer on four of the album's songs because she felt they understood each other well. Notable tracks on this album include "Same Heart" - a duet with Michael Bolton (although this came a year before his international breakthrough), and "Remind My Heart" which is a collaboration with producer Jellybean Benitez who was then at the peak of his fame.

Sales were satisfying in her most successful market, Germany, where the album reached No.3 and was certified platinum. The album had 340,000 pre-release orders in Germany, the largest ever ship-out for an album released by CBS records at the time. CBS used a "concentrated retail campaign" for the album and its lead single "You're My One and Only".

The album did not enter the albums chart in the United Kingdom but single success did come a few months later in the UK, when a duet with Plácido Domingo, "Till I Loved You", became a hit in the summer of 1989. The record company however failed to capitalise on this by not repromoting the album.

== Singles ==
"You're My One and Only", "Keep All the Fires Burning Bright" and "Love Get Ready" were released as singles to promote the album.

"You're My One and Only" entered several singles charts in Europe, reaching 21 in Switzerland, 27 in West Germany and 90 in the United Kingdom.

The second single "Keep All the Fires Burning Bright" began receiving radio adds in West Germany in December 1988 and the United Kingdom in March 1989. It was released in the United Kingdom on February 20, 1989. The song however failed to enter the singles charts in both countries.

The third single "Love Get Ready" began receiving radio adds in West Germany in April 1989. However, like with the previous single, this also failed to chart on the singles chart.

In addition to the three singles, the song "When I Look in Your Eyes" received a promotional release in Argentina.

The songs "You Don't Know What You've Got (Until It's Gone)" and "Love Get Ready" received airplay in Greece soon after the album's release despite neither being singles at the time.

== Reception ==
The pan-European magazine Music & Media named Passion one of its "albums of the week". The magazine described the album as "an energetic set of dramatic pop/rock, marked by square beats, a sentimental vibrato and a pompous setting". The "slightly African-tinged" and "surprisingly light-weight" song "When I Look in Your Eyes" was selected as the album's highlight.

== Track listing ==
Passion track listing
No.	Title	Writer(s)	Producer(s)	Length
1.	"Love Get Ready"	Michael Bolton; Bob Halligan Jr.	Harold Faltermeyer	4:03
2.	"You're My One and Only"	Marti Sharron; Chuck Wild	Rich Tancredi; Ric Wake	3:41
3.	"Falling in Love"	Ernie Gold	Michael Omartian	3:59
4.	"When I Look in Your Eyes"	Jack Conrad; Larry Henley	Tancredi; Wake	3:20
5.	"Remind My Heart"	Diane Warren	Jellybean	4:30
6.	"Keep All the Fires Burning Bright"	Jennifer Rush; Faltermeyer; Keith Forsey	Faltermeyer	4:53
7.	"Same Heart" (Duet with Michael Bolton)	Bolton; Halligan Jr.	Omartian	4:17
8.	"My Heart is Still Young"	Rush; Michael Roth; Geoffrey Iwamoto	Omartian	4:00
9.	"You Don't Know What You've Got ('Til it's Gone)"	Marti Sharron; Chuck Wild	Faltermeyer	4:30
10.	"Rain Coming Down on Me"	Rush; Bob Marlette; Nancy Shanks	Tancredi; Wake	4:06
11.	"Now That It's Over"	Bolton; Doug James	Faltermeyer	4:01
Total length:				45:26

- Spanish LP copies of the album replace "You're My One and Only" and "Keep All the Fires Burning Bright" with Spanish re-recordings of both songs titled "Vida De Mi Vida" and "Solitaria Mujer". Spanish CD copies also include the original English versions as additional tracks at the end of the album.

== Charts ==
=== Weekly charts ===
Weekly chart performance for Passion
Chart (1988)	Peak position
Australian Albums (ARIA)	124
Austrian Albums (Ö3 Austria)	24
European Albums (Music & Media)	11
Finnish Albums (Suomen virallinen lista)	14
German Albums (Offizielle Top 100)	3
Swedish Albums (Sverigetopplistan)	10
Swiss Albums (Schweizer Hitparade)	4

=== Year-end charts ===
Year-end chart performance for Passion
Chart (1988)	Position
German Albums (Offizielle Top 100)	71

== Release history ==
Region	Date	Label	Format(s)	Cat. No.	Ref.
United Kingdom	21 November 1988	CBS	LP; Cassette; CD	462968-1; 462968-4; 462968-2	

== Certifications ==
Certifications for Passion
Region	Certification	Certified units/sales
Germany (BVMI)	Platinum	500,000^{^}
Switzerland (IFPI Switzerland)	Gold	25,000^{^}
^{^} Shipments figures based on certification alone.
