= Ring of Ice =

- West German 7-inch single picture sleeve

Single by Jennifer Rush

from the album Jennifer Rush
- B-side: "Never Gonna Turn Back Again"; "Give Out"; "I See a Shadow (Not a Fantasy)"
- Released: September 1984
- Length: 3:50
- Label: CBS
- Songwriters: Jennifer Rush (Lyrics); Candy DeRouge (Lyrics and Music); Gunther Mende (Lyrics and Music)
- Producers: Candy DeRouge; Gunther Mende

Jennifer Rush singles chronology
"25 Lovers" (1984)	"Ring of Ice" (1984)	"The Power of Love" (1985)

Music video
- "Ring of Ice" on YouTube

"Ring of Ice" is a 1984 song recorded by American singer-songwriter Jennifer Rush. It was the fourth single from her self-titled debut album in West Germany and the second single from the album in the United Kingdom.

The song was re-recorded by Jennifer Rush for her 1998 album Classics and was released as a single from that album in 1999.

A remix by Stereoact was released as a standalone single on December 16, 2022.

== Commercial performance ==
In West Germany, the single was Rush's second to reach the top 30 of the singles chart, after "25 Lovers" earlier the same year. In the United Kingdom, the single was released in November 1985 following the success of "The Power of Love" and reached the top 20. The single was also Rush's second chart entry in Finland, where it entered in February 1986 and reached the top 20. "Ring of Ice" reached number 1 on the South African Springbok Radio chart and charted for 27 weeks. It was Rush's first entry on this chart, preceding the entry of "The Power of Love" by nearly four months.

== Track listings ==
=== 1984 German release ===
- 7-inch single
1. "Ring of Ice" – 3:50
2. "Never Gonna Turn Back Again" – 3:28
- 12-inch single
1. "Ring of Ice" (Extended Mix)^{[a]} – 6:16
2. "Give Out" – 3:18
3. "I See a Shadow (Not a Fantasy)" – 4:20

=== 1985 United Kingdom release ===
- 7-inch single
1. "Ring of Ice" (Remix)^{[b]} – 3:50
2. "Never Gonna Turn Back Again" – 3:28
- 12-inch single
1. "Ring of Ice" (Extended Remix)^{[b]} – 5:20
2. "Never Gonna Turn Back Again" – 3:28

=== 1999 release ===
- German CD single
1. "Ring of Ice" (Classics version) – 3:50
2. "Si Tu Eres Mi Hombre (The Power of Love)" (Classics version) – 6:07
3. "All I Want is You" – 3:56

=== 2022 release ===
- Digital download
1. "Ring of Ice" (Stereoact remix) – 3:36
2. "Ring of Ice" (Original version) – 3:50

Notes

- ^{^[a]} Remixed by Gunther Mende and Ralph Ruppert.
- ^{^[b]} Remixed by Walter Samuel.
- Both extended mixes were later included on the 2007 box set Stronghold – The Collector's Hit Box.

== Charts ==
=== Weekly charts ===
Chart (1984–1986)	Peak position
Belgium (Ultratop 50 Flanders)	21
European Top 100 Singles (Eurotipsheet)	50
Finland (Suomen virallinen lista)	15
Ireland (IRMA)	9
Luxembourg (Radio Luxembourg)	14
South Africa (Springbok Radio)	1
UK Singles (Official Charts)	14
West Germany (GfK)	22

2024 weekly chart performance for "Ring of Ice" (Stereoact remix)
Chart (2024)	Position
Estonia Airplay (TopHit)	41

=== Year-end charts ===
Year-end chart performance for "Ring of Ice" (Stereoact remix)
Chart (2024)	Position
Estonia Airplay (TopHit)	62

== Release history ==
Release history
Region	Date	Label	Format	Cat. No.	Ref.
United Kingdom	December 2, 1985	CBS	7-inch; 12-inch	CBS A 4745; CBS TX 4645	

== Certifications ==
Certifications for "Ring of Ice"
Region	Certification	Certified units/sales
Germany (BVMI)	Gold	300,000^{‡}
^{‡} Sales+streaming figures based on certification alone.
