= The Power of Love (Jennifer Rush song) =

1984 single by Jennifer Rush

Single by Jennifer Rush

from the album Jennifer Rush
- B-side: "I See a Shadow (Not a Fantasy)"
- Released: December 1984
- Studio: CBS
- Genre: Pop
- Length: 6:00
- Label: CBS
- Composers: Gunther Mende; Candy DeRouge
- Lyricists: Jennifer Rush; Mary Susan Applegate
- Producers: Gunther Mende; Candy DeRouge

Jennifer Rush singles chronology
"Ring of Ice" (1984)	"The Power of Love" (1984)	"Destiny" (1985)

Music video
- "The Power of Love" on YouTube

"The Power of Love" is a pop power ballad co-written and first recorded by American singer-songwriter Jennifer Rush in 1984. Released in December 1984 by CBS Records as the fifth single from her debut album, Jennifer Rush, the song became her breakthrough hit and later attracted notable cover versions by Air Supply, Laura Branigan, and Celine Dion.

Recorded in Germany, where Rush was based at the time, the original version was issued in West Germany in late 1984. It reached number one on the UK Singles Chart in October 1985, becoming the best-selling single of the year in the United Kingdom and the ninth best-selling single of the decade. It also topped the charts in several other European countries, as well as Canada, Australia, New Zealand, Israel and South Africa.

Celine Dion's 1993 recording became the most commercially successful reinterpretation, reaching number one in the United States, Canada, and Australia, and entering the top 10 in numerous other territories in 1994. The song has since been translated into multiple languages and is regarded as a modern pop standard.

== Overview ==
"The Power of Love" was first recorded in Germany by Jennifer Rush for her 1984 eponymous album. It was released as a single in West Germany in December 1984. In June 1985, "The Power of Love" was issued as a single in the United Kingdom, where, after a 16‑week climb, it reached number one on the UK Singles Chart for five weeks in October 1985 and became Britain's best-selling song of 1985. The success of the single resulted in Jennifer becoming the second best-selling singles artist in the United Kingdom of 1985 behind Madonna. According to a chart performance survey by Music Week, "The Power of Love" was the best performing single and Jennifer the best performing singles artist for the period from October to December 1985. Rush performed the song on the British music TV show Top of the Pops in late 1985. As of March 2017, it had sold 1.45 million copies in the United Kingdom.

The strong performance of "The Power of Love" in the United Kingdom was followed by widespread international success in late 1985 and early 1986, including a German re-release that reached number nine. The single eventually topped the charts in Australia, Austria, Ireland, New Zealand, Norway, South Africa, and Spain (where Rush reached number one with a Spanish-language version titled "Si tú eres mi hombre y yo tu mujer", translated as "If you are my man and I'm your woman"). It also peaked at number three in Switzerland, Sweden, and Belgium, and at number seven in the Netherlands.

CBS initially delayed releasing "The Power of Love" in North America, considering it too European in style. It was finally issued in the United States and Canada in January 1986. Although it rose to number one in Canada, the single did not become a major US hit, peaking at number 57 on the Billboard Hot 100 for the week ending April 5, 1986, and spending 13 weeks on the chart. Rush performed the song on The Tonight Show Starring Johnny Carson in March 1986 and on American Bandstand in April 1986.

=== Spanish version ===
A Spanish re-recording titled "Si tú eres mi hombre y yo tu mujer" (meaning "If You Were My Man and I Your Lady") was released in 1986, with lyrics adapted by Luis Gómez-Escolar. The Spanish version entered the Spanish singles chart at number 16 in April 1986 while the original English version remained at number 2. It topped the Spanish singles chart for six consecutive weeks. It was also the fifth best-selling single in Spain in 1986. "Si tú eres mi hombre y yo tu mujer" was added to Spanish re-issues of the album beginning in 1986. Rush re-recorded the Spanish version in 1998 for her album Classics, and it appeared on Spanish pressings of that release. The original 1986 recording was later included on the 2007 box set Stronghold – The Collector's Hit Box.

== Critical reception ==
Michele Greppi from The Atlanta Journal-Constitution named "The Power of Love" the "best cut" on the album, praising Rush's voice and noting that her "operatic training shows in her incredible range (with no apparent loss of power or flexibility at either top or bottom)". Tom Ewing of Freaky Trigger wrote that it is "a song about how love removes your own sense of scale, makes existence itself unfamiliar, so the disorientating disconnect between it and anything resembling my emotional reality makes a sort of warped sense". He added that the chorus is "so memorable". Alan Jones from Music Week described it as "frankly superior". Stephen Holden of The New York Times remarked that Rush "has a distinctive alto that combines an almost folkish intonation with a declamatory, quasi-operatic delivery. It is a voice that doesn't fit comfortably into any category". Richard Defendorf of The Orlando Sentinel called it a "goopy ballad". People magazine wrote that "what's most impressive is Rush's voice. Throaty, intense and wide-ranging". The reviewer also noted "intelligent passion" in the "broody" "The Power of Love".

In a retrospective review, Pop Rescue described it as a "fantastically classic power ballad" and "flawless", adding that Rush's vocals are "rich, strong, and wonderfully spine tingling". Greg Kennedy of the Red Deer Advocate described the song as "plaintive" and "poignant". A writer for The Stage referred to it as a "superballad". Australian music channel Max included "The Power of Love" in its 2011 list of the "1000 Greatest Songs of All Time".

== Music video ==
The accompanying music video for "The Power of Love" was directed by German director Michael Leckebusch. It was filmed in New York City. The video opens with early‑morning scenes of the city, followed by a group of men searching an empty office. They are discovered by Rush's partner, who appears to work night shifts. The narrative then shifts to Rush leaving Madison Square Garden before she begins singing. At home, she opens the bedroom door to find her partner asleep. When the chorus begins, Rush is shown in a freight elevator moving upward. Additional scenes depict the men coercing her partner, while other shots show Rush wearing black sunglasses on a dock, watching the group meet on a pier. They are later seen hitting her partner with a car, suggesting that Rush is trying to protect him from their influence. Near the end, she walks alone through the city at dusk, singing. The video concludes with her returning home and checking once more that her partner is asleep before closing the door. As of January 2025, the video had accumulated more than 161 million views on YouTube.

== Official versions ==
List of official versions of "The Power of Love"

Version	Year	Length	Notes	Ref.
Original album version	1984	6:00	Jennifer Rush album (German pressing).; Used for German pressings of "The Power of Love" single.	
Special radio edit	1985	4:43	Edit of the original album version.; Used for German 7-inch promo.; Included on the compilation Stronghold – The Collector's Hit Box (2007).	
First video edit	1985	2:45	Edit used for the first music video; not commercially released.	
International album version	1985	5:45	Remixed by Walter Samuel.; Jennifer Rush album (international version).; Used for U.K. pressings of "The Power of Love" (original 1985 release only).	
International radio edit/remix	1985	4:28	Edit of the international album version.; Initially used for the U.K. 7-inch promo.; Later used for the U.K. 1986 re-release, U.S. and Canadian singles, and the B-side of "Si Tu Eres Mi Hombre Y Yo Tu Mujer".; Known simply as "Remix" on most single releases.; Included on the compilation The Power of Love: The Best of Jennifer Rush (2000).	
Second video edit	1985	4:58	Edit of the international album version used for the second music video.	
Orchestral remix	1985	6:00	Orchestral overdub of the original album version.; Included on German 7-inch and 12-inch singles from the 1985 re-release.; Also included on the 1995 CD single.	
Orchestral remix video edit	1985	2:45	Edit of the Orchestral Remix used for the re-dubbed version of the first music video.	
Si Tu Eres Mi Hombre Y Yo Tu Mujer	1986	5:15	Spanish re-recording.; Released in Spanish-speaking and Portuguese-speaking countries.; Included on Stronghold – The Collector's Hit Box (2007).	
Extended remix	1986	7:10	Remixed by Walter Samuel.; Released on the U.K. 12-inch single (1986 re-release).; Included on Stronghold – The Collector's Hit Box (2007).	
Classics version	1998	6:07	Re-recording for the album Classics.	
Si Tu Eres Mi Hombre (The Power of Love)	1998	6:07	Spanish re-recording for Spanish pressings of Classics.; Released in Spain as a promotional single.	
Special edit version	2010	3:34	Previously unreleased edit of the 1998 re-recording.; Included on The Very Best Of (The EMI/Virgin Years) (2010).	
Hungarian version	Unreleased	–	A Hungarian version was recorded in 1998 for Classics but remains unreleased.	

== Formats and track listing ==
=== Original releases ===
- European 7-inch single (1985) – CBS A 5003
1. "The Power of Love" (original album version) – 6:00
2. "I See a Shadow (Not a Fantasy)" – 4:20
- European 7-inch promo (1985) – CBS PROSI 24
1. "The Power of Love" (special radio edit) – 4:50
2. "The Power of Love" (original album version) – 6:00
- European 12-inch single (1985) – CBS A 12.5003
1. "The Power of Love" (original album version) – 6:00
2. "Nobody Move" – 3:12
3. "Into My Dreams" – 4:00
- UK 7-inch single (1985) – CBS A 5003
1. "The Power of Love" (international album version) – 5:46
2. "I See a Shadow (Not a Fantasy)" – 4:20
- UK 7-inch promo (1985) – CBS A 5003
1. "The Power of Love" (radio edit) – 4:20
2. "The Power of Love" (international album version) – 5:46
- UK 12-inch single (1985) – CBS TX 5003
1. "The Power of Love" (international album version) – 5:46
2. "Come Give Me Your Hand" – 3:49
3. "I See a Shadow (Not a Fantasy)" – 4:20
- Spanish 7-inch single (1986) – CBS A 5003 / US and Canada 7-inch single (1986) – Epic 34-05754
1. "The Power of Love" (Walter Samuel remix) – 4:20
2. "I See a Shadow (Not a Fantasy)" – 4:20

=== Re-releases ===
- European 7-inch single (1985/1986) – CBS A 5003
1. "The Power of Love" (orchestral remix) – 6:00
2. "I See a Shadow (Not a Fantasy)" – 4:20
- European 12-inch single (1985/1986) – CBS A 12.5003
1. "The Power of Love" (orchestral remix) – 6:00
2. "Nobody Move" – 3:12
3. "Into My Dreams" – 4:00
- Spanish version 7-inch single (1986) – CBS A 6975
1. "Si Tu Eres Mi Hombre Y Yo Tu Mujer" – 5:10
2. "The Power of Love" (Walter Samuel remix) – 4:20
- UK 7-inch single (1986) – CBS A 5003
1. "The Power of Love" (Walter Samuel remix) – 4:20
2. "I See a Shadow (Not a Fantasy)" – 4:20
- UK 12-inch single (1986) – CBS TX 5003
1. "The Power of Love" (Walter Samuel extended remix) – 7:10
2. "Come Give Me Your Hand" – 3:49
3. "I See a Shadow (Not a Fantasy)" – 4:20
- German CD single (1995) – Colombia 661411 2
1. "The Power of Love" (special radio edit) – 4:50
2. "The Power of Love" (orchestral remix) – 6:00
3. "Ave Maria (Survivors of a Different Kind)" – 3:48

== Charts ==
=== Weekly charts ===
Weekly chart performance
Chart (1984–1986)	Peak position
Australia (Kent Music Report)	1
Austria (Ö3 Austria Top 40)	1
Belgium (Ultratop 50 Flanders)	3
Canada Top Singles (RPM)	1
Canada Adult Contemporary (RPM)	1
Europe (Europarade Top 40)	3
Europe (Eurochart Hot 100)	3
Finland (Suomen virallinen lista)	6
France (SNEP)	32
Greece (IFPI)	3
Ireland (IRMA)	1
Israel (Israeli Singles Chart)	1
Luxembourg (Radio Luxembourg)	1
Netherlands (Dutch Top 40)	7
Netherlands (Single Top 100)	4
New Zealand (Recorded Music NZ)	1
Norway (VG-lista)	1
Portugal (AFP)	1
South Africa (Springbok)	1
Spain (PROMUSICAE)	2
Spain (PROMUSICAE) Si Tu Eres Mi Hombre Y Yo Tu Mujer	1
Sweden (Sverigetopplistan)	3
Switzerland (Schweizer Hitparade)	3
UK Singles (Official Charts)	1
UK Singles (OCC) Re-release	55
UK Disco and Dance Singles (MRIB)	3
US Billboard Hot 100	57
West Germany (Gfk)	16
West Germany (GfK) Orchestral remix	9

Weekly chart performance
Chart (2022)	Peak position
UK Singles Downloads Chart (OCC)	58
UK Singles Sales Chart (OCC)	59

=== Year-end charts ===
1985 year-end chart performance
Chart (1985)	Position
Australia (Kent Music Report)	23
Belgium (Ultratop 50 Flanders)	45
Europe (Europarade Top 40)	32
Netherlands (Dutch Top 40)	70
Netherlands (Single Top 100)	49
New Zealand (RIANZ)	19
UK Singles (OCC)	1
UK Disco and Dance Singles (MRIB)	34
West Germany (Media Control)	75

1986 year-end chart performance
Chart (1986)	Position
Australia (Kent Music Report)	47
Austria (Ö3 Austria Top 40)	14
Canada Top Singles (RPM)	1
Switzerland (Schweizer Hitparade)	21

=== Decade-end charts ===
Decade-end chart performance
Chart (1980–1989)	Position
UK Singles (OCC)	9

=== All-time charts ===
All-time chart performance
Chart (1952–2014)	Position
UK Singles (OCC)	47

== Certifications and sales ==
Certifications
Region	Certification	Certified units/sales
Australia (ARIA)	Gold	35,000^{^}
Austria (IFPI Austria)	Gold	50,000^{*}
Canada (Music Canada)	Gold	50,000^{^}
New Zealand (RMNZ)	Gold	10,000^{*}
Poland (ZPAV)	Gold	50,000
South Africa (RISA)	Gold	10,000^{*}
Sweden (GLF)	Platinum	50,000^{^}
United Kingdom (BPI)	Platinum	1,450,000
^{*} Sales figures based on certification alone.^{^} Shipments figures based on certification alone.

== Release history ==
Release history
Region	Date	Format	Version	Label	Ref.
West Germany	December 10, 1984	7-inch; 12-inch	Original LP version	CBS	
United Kingdom	May 28, 1985	7-inch	International LP version	CBS	
United Kingdom	August 1985	12-inch	International LP version	CBS	
Japan	October 1, 1985	7-inch; 12-inch	Orchestral remix	Epic	
Australia; New Zealand	October 7, 1985	7-inch	Orchestral remix	CBS	
West Germany	November 1985	7-inch; 12-inch	Orchestral remix	CBS	
Spain	March 1986	7-inch	Spanish re-recording; radio edit/remix	CBS	
United Kingdom	1 December 1986	7-inch; 12-inch	Radio edit/remix; extended remix	CBS	
Germany	March 6, 1995	CD	Radio edit; orchestral remix	Columbia	

== Air Supply version ==
"The Power of Love (You Are My Lady)"

Single by Air Supply

from the album Air Supply
- B-side: "Sunset"
- Released: July 1985
- Length: 5:22
- Label: Arista
- Composers: Gunther Mende; Candy DeRouge
- Lyricists: Jennifer Rush; Mary Susan Applegate
- Producer: Peter Collins

Air Supply singles chronology
"Just as I Am" (1985)	"The Power of Love (You Are My Lady)" (1985)	"Lonely Is the Night" (1986)

Music video
- "The Power of Love (You Are My Lady)" on YouTube

The British/Australian duo Air Supply recorded their version of "The Power of Love" for the 1985 album Air Supply. It was issued as a single in the United States in July 1985. To avoid confusion with "The Power of Love" by Huey Lewis and the News, which was charting at the same time, the title was expanded to "The Power of Love (You Are My Lady)". The single achieved moderate success in New Zealand and Canada, reaching the Top 40 in both countries in late 1985, and peaked at number 68 in the United States.

=== Formats and track listing ===
- 7-inch single
1. "The Power of Love (You Are My Lady)" – 4:06
2. "Sunset" – 2:47

=== Credits and personnel ===
- Russell Hitchcock – vocals
- Graham Russell – background vocals

=== Charts ===
Chart performance
Chart (1985)	Peak position
Canada Top Singles (RPM)	35
Canada Adult Contemporary (RPM)	4
New Zealand (Recorded Music NZ)	21
US Billboard Hot 100	68
US Adult Contemporary (Billboard)	13

== Laura Branigan version ==
"Power of Love"

Single by Laura Branigan

from the album Touch
- B-side: "Spirit of Love"
- Released: October 1987
- Studio: Powertrax (Hollywood)
- Length: 5:19
- Label: Atlantic
- Composers: Gunther Mende; Candy DeRouge
- Lyricists: Jennifer Rush; Mary Susan Applegate
- Producer: David Kershenbaum

Laura Branigan singles chronology
"Shattered Glass" (1987)	"Power of Love" (1987)	"Cry Wolf" (1988)

Audio
- "Power of Love" on YouTube

American singer Laura Branigan recorded "The Power of Love" under the title "Power of Love" for her fifth studio album, Touch (1987). Produced by David Kershenbaum, it was released in October 1987 by Atlantic Records as the album's second single. The song reached number 26 on the US Billboard Hot 100 in December 1987, becoming Branigan's seventh and final Top 40 hit. It also peaked at number 19 on the Billboard Hot Adult Contemporary chart.

Branigan described the track as "the ultimate in singing", calling it "a real emotional tear-your-heart-out kind of song" and "a classic torch song with today's feeling". She added that its wide vocal range made it both demanding and deeply expressive.

=== Formats and track listing ===
- 7-inch and cassette single
1. "Power of Love" (edit) – 4:44
2. "Spirit of Love" (edit) – 3:35

=== Credits and personnel ===
Credits adapted from the liner notes of Touch.

- Laura Branigan – vocals
- David Kershenbaum – production
- Bob Marlette – arrangements, keyboards, drum programming, guitars, string arrangements
- Kim Scharnberg – string arrangements, conducting
- Kenneth G. Kugler – copyist
- Julie Ann Gigante, Ralph D. Morrison III, Clayton Haslop, Alexander Horvath, R.F. Peterson, Arthur Zadinsky, Michael Nowak, Raymond J. Tischer II, Margot MacLaine, Armen Ksjikian, Dennis Karmazyn, Michael Matthews – strings
- David J. Holman – engineering, mixing, PPG programming

=== Charts ===
Chart performance
Chart (1987)	Peak position
Argentina (Prensario)	1
US Billboard Hot 100	26
US Adult Contemporary (Billboard)	19
US Cash Box Top 100	29

== Celine Dion version ==
"The Power of Love"

Single by Celine Dion

from the album The Colour of My Love
- B-side: "No Living Without Loving You"
- Released: November 1993
- Studio: The Enterprise; Ground Control; Record Plant
- Genre: Pop
- Length: 5:42 (Album Version); 4:42 (Single Version)
- Label: Columbia; Epic
- Composers: Gunther Mende; Candy DeRouge
- Lyricists: Jennifer Rush; Mary Susan Applegate
- Producer: David Foster

Celine Dion singles chronology
"When I Fall in Love" (1993)	"The Power of Love" (1993)	"L'amour existe encore" (1994)

Music video
- "The Power of Love" on YouTube

Canadian singer Celine Dion recorded "The Power of Love" for her third English-language album, The Colour of My Love (1993). Produced by David Foster, it was issued as the album's lead single in November 1993. Dion's recording became an international success, reaching number one in the United States, Canada, and Australia, and entering the top ten in several other countries. The accompanying music video was directed by Randee St. Nicholas. Billboard later ranked her rendition as the 46th greatest love song of all time.

=== Critical reception ===
Dion's rendition of "The Power of Love" was widely praised by critics. About.com placed it at number seven on their list of "Top 10 Celine Dion Songs", calling it a "big ballad". Stephen Thomas Erlewine of AllMusic singled it out in his review of The Colour of My Love. A reviewer for The Baltimore Sun wrote that Dion "sounds great" when performing "tunefully romantic stuff". Dave Sholin of the Gavin Report commented, "A song this powerful places extraordinary demands on those who sing it. Only a rare few are up to the task... Add Celine's interpretation to producer David Foster's arrangement and the result is nothing short of superb". Fellow Gavin Report editor Ron Fell praised it as "awesome!" and said it was "made better than ever".

Caroline Sullivan of The Guardian described Dion's version as "bodice-bursting". Mike Wass of Idolator praised her "flawless vocal" and the "classy" Foster arrangement. Dennis Hunt of the LA Times compared her vocals favorably to those of Whitney Houston and Mariah Carey, noting "that grandiose, note-stretching finish". Pan-European magazine Music & Media called it a "tender rendition" and "the obligatory majestic ballad" for albums of its genre, noting that her US number 1 hit proved its effectiveness. Alan Jones of Music Week said it "is so powerful it's sure to score". The Network Forty described it as "a reflective ballad brought to life by Celine's brilliantly distinctive vocals". The Plain Dealer called it a "soaring rendition". Christopher Smith of Talk About Pop Music described it as "powerful and faithful to the original version".

=== Commercial performance ===
Dion's version became the best-selling single by a female artist in the United States in 1994, and the eighth best-selling single overall that year, with sales of 900,000 copies. It was her first US number one hit, topping the Billboard Hot 100 for four weeks in February 1994. The single also reached number one on the Cash Box Top 100 and became her first Australian chart-topper and second Canadian chart-topper. It also led the adult contemporary charts in both the United States and Canada.

Internationally, "The Power of Love" reached the top 10 in France, the United Kingdom, Belgium, Sweden, and New Zealand. It earned multiple certifications, including double platinum in Canada and platinum in the United States (with 1.5 million copies sold), Australia, New Zealand, and the United Kingdom, as well as gold in France and Denmark.

=== Music video ===
A music video for "The Power of Love" was directed by American director, photographer, and designer Randee St. Nicholas, showing Dion performing the song in various locations inside an elegant apartment. It includes scenes of Dion singing while lying on a bed, sitting by a fireplace, standing before a rose‑patterned wall, or looking out from behind a window. The video received heavy rotation on major music video networks and programs.

=== Live performances ===
Dion performed "The Power of Love" extensively on tour, and the song appears on many of her live albums. It is also included on several of her greatest hits compilations, such as All the Way... A Decade of Song (1999), Complete Best (2008), My Love: Essential Collection (2008), and The Best of Celine Dion & David Foster (2012). Live versions are featured on À l'Olympia, Live à Paris (album and video), Au cœur du stade, Live in Las Vegas: A New Day..., Taking Chances World Tour: The Concert, and Céline une seule fois / Live 2013. She also performed the song at the American Music Awards of 1995 and during her CBS television special That's Just the Woman in Me on February 15, 2008.

=== Accolades ===
"The Power of Love" won the ASCAP Pop Award for Most Performed Song in the United States. Dion received nominations for the Grammy Award for Best Female Pop Vocal Performance, the American Music Award for Favorite Pop/Rock Single, and two Billboard Music Awards: Hot 100 Single of the Year and Hot Adult Contemporary Single of the Year. The song was also nominated for the Juno Award for Single of the Year. Producer David Foster received a nomination for the Juno Award for Producer of the Year for his work on the track.

=== Cultural impact ===
Siren kings, members of a New Zealand street subculture focused on the volume and clarity of music played through public address system loudspeakers, regard Dion's version of "The Power of Love" as ideal for their competitions. Siren king Purp Ci'i said the track "will smash anyone in a battle—that song is dangerous... It's an old favourite from when sirens first started".

=== Formats and track listing ===
- 7-inch, cassette, and CD single
1. "The Power of Love" (radio edit) – 4:47
2. "No Living Without Loving You" – 4:22
- European 12-inch and CD single
1. "The Power of Love" (radio edit) – 4:47
2. "No Living Without Loving You" – 4:22
3. "Did You Give Enough Love" – 4:22
- Japanese CD single
1. "The Power of Love" (radio edit) – 4:47
2. "No Living Without Loving You" – 4:22
3. "If You Asked Me To" – 3:55
- Japanese 1996 3-inch CD single
1. "The Power of Love" (radio edit) – 4:47
2. "If You Asked Me To" – 3:55

=== Credits and personnel ===
- Celine Dion – vocal
- David Foster – producer, keyboards
- Simon Franglen – Synclavier programming
- Michael Thompson – guitars
- Humberto Gatica – engineer, mix
- David Reitzas – engineer
- Bill Leonard – assistant engineer
- Erich Baron – assistant engineer
- Fred Kelly – assistant engineer

Credits adapted from the album liner notes.

=== Charts ===
==== Weekly charts ====
Weekly chart performance
Chart (1993–1994)	Peak position
Australia (ARIA)	1
Belgium (Ultratop 50 Flanders)	5
Canada Top Singles (RPM)	1
Canada Adult Contemporary (RPM)	1
Canada Retail Singles (The Record)	1
Canada Contemporary Hit Radio (The Record)	1
Canada Pop Adult (The Record)	1
Europe (Eurochart Hot 100)	17
Europe (European AC Radio)	10
Europe (European Hit Radio)	11
France (SNEP)	3
Germany (GfK)	57
Iceland (Íslenski Listinn Topp 40)	3
Ireland (IRMA)	13
Israel (Israeli Singles Chart)	16
Netherlands (Dutch Top 40)	18
Netherlands (Single Top 100)	22
New Zealand (Recorded Music NZ)	7
Panama (UPI)	4
Quebec Radio Songs (ADISQ)	1
Scottish Singles Sales (Official Charts)	14
Sweden (Sverigetopplistan)	6
UK Singles (Official Charts)	4
UK Airplay (Music Week)	18
US Billboard Hot 100	1
US Adult Contemporary (Billboard)	1
US Pop Airplay (Billboard)	2
US Rhythmic Airplay (Billboard)	21
US Cash Box Top 100	1

==== Year-end charts ====
1993 year-end chart performance
Chart (1993)	Position
Canada Adult Contemporary (RPM)	62

1994 year-end chart performance
Chart (1994)	Position
Australia (ARIA)	6
Belgium (Ultratop 50 Flanders)	25
Brazil (Mais Tocadas)	22
Canada Top Singles (RPM)	10
Canada Adult Contemporary (RPM)	2
Europe (Eurochart Hot 100)	40
France (SNEP)	12
Iceland (Íslenski Listinn Topp 40)	70
Netherlands (Dutch Top 40)	148
New Zealand (RIANZ)	47
Sweden (Topplistan)	27
UK Singles (OCC)	61
US Billboard Hot 100	4
US Adult Contemporary (Billboard)	4
US Cash Box Top 100	20

==== Decade-end charts ====
Decade-end chart performance
Chart (1990–1999)	Position
Canada (Nielsen SoundScan)	5
France (SNEP)	160
US Billboard Hot 100	48

==== All-time charts ====
All-time chart performance
Chart	Position
Canada (Nielsen SoundScan)	12

=== Certifications and sales ===
Certifications
Region	Certification	Certified units/sales
Australia (ARIA)	Platinum	70,000^{^}
Canada (Music Canada)	2× Platinum	160,000^{‡}
Denmark (IFPI Danmark)	Gold	45,000^{‡}
France (SNEP)	Gold	250,000^{*}
New Zealand (RMNZ)	Gold	5,000^{*}
New Zealand (RMNZ) digital	Platinum	30,000^{‡}
United Kingdom (BPI)	Platinum	600,000^{‡}
United States (RIAA)	Platinum	1,471,000
^{*} Sales figures based on certification alone.^{^} Shipments figures based on certification alone.^{‡} Sales+streaming figures based on certification alone.

=== Release history ===
Region	Date	Format(s)	Label(s)	Ref.
United States	November 1993	7-inch vinyl; CD; cassette	550 Music; Epic	
Australia	December 6, 1993	CD; cassette	Epic	
Japan	December 12, 1993	CD	Epic/Sony	
United Kingdom	January 17, 1994	7-inch vinyl; CD; cassette	Epic	
Japan	July 17, 1996	Mini CD	Epic/Sony	

== Cover versions ==
The Spanish version of Jennifer Rush's "The Power of Love", titled "Si tu eres mi hombre y yo tu mujer", was introduced by Dominican singer Ángela Carrasco in 1986 and became widely known across Latin America. The same adaptation was later recorded by several Latin artists, including Yolandita Monge, Amanda Miguel, and La India. La India's rendition reached number 38 on the Hot Latin Songs chart in the United States. Brazilian singer Rosana recorded a Portuguese version, "O Amor e o Poder", which appeared on the soundtrack of the 8PM prime time telenovela Mandala (1987–88) as the theme for the lead character Jocasta (Vera Fischer). Her version achieved major commercial success, becoming the sixth most played song in Brazil in 1988 and marking the peak of Rosana's career. It was also included on her album Coração Selvagem and contributed to its strong sales, which exceeded 300,000 copies. Wilfrido Vargas's New York Band recorded a merengue version that peaked at number 37 on the Hot Latin Songs chart. Italian dance act Fits of Gloom released their version in 1994 with vocals by British singer Lizzy Mack, reaching number 49 on the UK Singles Chart.

== See also ==
- 1985 in British music
- Billboard Year-End Hot 100 singles of 1994
- List of Australian chart achievements and milestones
- List of best-selling singles of the 1980s in the United Kingdom
- List of Billboard Hot 100 number ones of 1994
- List of Billboard Hot 100 number-one singles of the 1990s
- List of Billboard Hot 100 top-ten singles in 1994
- List of Hot Adult Contemporary number ones of 1994
- List of million-selling singles in the United Kingdom
- List of number-one singles from the 1980s (New Zealand)
- List of number-one singles in Australia during the 1980s
- List of number-one singles in Australia during the 1990s
- List of number-one singles of 1985 (Ireland)
- List of number-one singles of 1986 (Canada)
- List of number-one singles of 1986 (Spain)
- List of number-one singles of 1994 (Canada)
- List of top 25 singles for 1985 in Australia
- List of top 25 singles for 1994 in Australia
- List of top 40 singles for 1980–1989 in Australia
- List of UK singles chart number ones of the 1980s
- List of UK top-ten singles in 1994
- RPM Year-End
- VG-lista 1964 to 1994
