= 25 Lovers =

Single by Jennifer Rush

from the album Jennifer Rush
- B-side: "Surrender"
- Released: 1984
- Label: CBS
- Songwriter(s): Jennifer Rush (Lyrics); Candy DeRouge (Lyrics and Music); Gunther Mende (Lyrics and Music)
- Producer(s): Candy DeRouge; Gunther Mende

Jennifer Rush singles chronology
"Come Give Me Your Hand" (1983)	"25 Lovers" (1984)	"Ring of Ice" (1984)

Music video
- "25 Lovers" on YouTube

"25 Lovers" is a 1984 song recorded by American singer-songwriter Jennifer Rush. It was the third single from her self-titled debut studio album in West Germany and reached the Top 25 on the singles chart.

The song was re-recorded by Jennifer Rush for her ninth studio album Classics (1998).

== Background ==
"25 Lovers" was Jennifer Rush's breakthrough hit in West Germany. It was her first single to enter the singles chart and ultimately peaked at number 25.

Rush promoted the single through a performance on the TV show Musikladen on 3 May 1984 and a music video that premiered on Formel Eins on 4 June 1984.

The song was later included on Rush's compilation album The Power of Jennifer Rush (1991).

== Track listing ==
- 7-inch single
1. "25 Lovers" – 3:37
2. "Surrender" – 3:17

== Charts ==
Chart (1984)	Peak position
European Top 100 Singles (Eurotipsheet)	100
West Germany (GfK)	25
