= Jennifer Rush (1984 album) =

- Original 1984 cover art

Studio album by Jennifer Rush
- Released: March 2, 1984
- Recorded: 1983–1984
- Genres: Pop; synth-pop; pop rock
- Length: 39:00
- Label: CBS
- Producers: Candy DeRouge; Gunther Mende

Jennifer Rush chronology
Jennifer Rush (1984)	Movin' (1985)

Alternative cover
- 1985 international reissue cover art

Singles from Jennifer Rush
- 1. "Into My Dreams" Released: 1983 (Germany); 2. "Come Give Me Your Hand" Released: 1983 (EU); 3. "25 Lovers" Released: May 1984 (Germany); 4. "Ring of Ice" Released: October 1984 (EU) / November 1985 (UK); 5. "The Power of Love" Released: December 1984 (EU) / June 1985 (UK); 6. "Madonna's Eyes" Released: February 1986 (UK)

Jennifer Rush is the debut studio album by American pop singer Jennifer Rush, released on March 2, 1984, by CBS Records International. The album was commercially successful across Europe, reaching the top 10 in many countries, including Germany, where it spent 97 weeks on the chart. It features the song "The Power of Love", which reached number one in several countries around the world.

The album sold three million copies worldwide by late 1988.

== Overview ==
Based in Germany, Rush teamed up with producers Candy DeRouge and Gunther Mende and released the first two singles from this album; "Into My Dreams" and "Come Give Me Your Hand" in 1983. It was in 1984 that she found her first success with the song "25 Lovers". This was followed by "Ring of Ice" and then with "The Power of Love", which remains her biggest hit worldwide. In 1985, the song became a massive success and reached number one on the UK Singles Chart for five weeks, selling over a million copies. It was at the time the best-selling single ever by a female artist and is still one of the best-selling singles ever. Success in her native United States proved elusive, as the single peaked at No. 57 on the Billboard Hot 100. "Ring of Ice" was chosen as the follow-up single in the UK, where it charted within the top 20. Further hits proved harder to come by, as another UK release, "Madonna's Eyes" failed to reach the top 75.

Having been released in Germany in 1984, the album was repackaged and released internationally in late 1985. It was originally planned for release in the United Kingdom on 15 July 1985. However, it was first re-scheduled to 27 August before again being pushed back to 2 September. It was finally released in the United Kingdom on LP and Cassette in the week of 4 November 1985. The CD release followed on 23 December.

In some countries, the Jennifer Rush album was a cross section of tracks from this release and Movin' (1985), either titled Jennifer Rush (Canada, German Democratic Republic) or Movin' (Venezuela).

== Commercial performance ==
The album became a big seller, peaking at No. 7 in the UK and No. 2 in Germany, spending 97 weeks on the German chart. In other European countries, the album also charted well, topping the charts in Norway and reaching the top five in Sweden, Switzerland, and Austria.

The album reached Gold certification status in West Germany by March 1985. It went on to achieve a double platinum certification in the country.

== Critical reception ==
The pan-European magazine Music & Media praised Rush's "definite strong and rough" voice on the album, and noted the album itself had material that varied from "mainstream US rock to mid tempo AOR material", singling out "Madonna's Eyes", "Ring of Ice" and "Nobody Move" as the best tracks.

== Track listing ==
=== Standard release ===
Two versions of the album were released worldwide. The original version was first released in West Germany in 1984. An "International edition" was released in most countries outside of West Germany beginning in 1985, which contained remixed versions of the songs "Madonna's Eyes" (3:45), "25 Lovers", "Ring of Ice" and "The Power of Love" (5:45).

Jennifer Rush track listing
No.	Title	Lyrics	Music	Length
1.	"Madonna's Eyes"	Mary Susan Applegate	Candy de Rouge; Gunther Mende	3:30
2.	"25 Lovers"	Jennifer Rush; Rouge; Mende	Rouge; Mende	3:37
3.	"Come Give Me Your Hand"	Rush; Rouge; Mende	Rouge; Mende	3:49
4.	"Nobody Move"	Patrick Henderson; Richard Feldmann; Marcy Levy	Henderson; Feldmann; Levy	3:32
5.	"Never Gonna Turn Back Again"	Rush	Rouge; Mende	3:28
6.	"Ring of Ice"	Rush; Rouge; Mende	Rouge; Mende	3:50
7.	"Into My Dreams"	Rush; Rouge; Mende	Rouge; Mende	4:00
8.	"I See a Shadow (Not a Fantasy)"	Rush	Rouge; Mende	4:20
9.	"Surrender"	Rush	Erich Klapperton	3:15
10.	"The Power of Love"	Rush; Applegate	Rouge; Mende	6:00

Notes:

- Some cassette pressings swap the track positions of "Never Gonna Turn Back Again" and "The Power of Love".

=== 1986 Spanish re-issue ===
Following the success of "Si Tu Eres Mi Hombre Y Yo Tu Mujer", the album was re-released in Spain with the song added at the beginning of the track list. The track list was also rearranged on this reissue.

1986 Spanish reissue – CBS S 26914 SP
No.	Title	Lyrics	Music	Length
1.	"Si Tu Eres Mi Hombre Y Yo Tu Mujer" (The Power of Love)	Luis Gómez-Escolar (Spanish Lyrics); Jennifer Rush; Mary Susan Applegate	Candy de Rouge; Gunther Mende	5:15
2.	"Madonna's Eyes"	Applegate	Rouge; Mende	3:30
3.	"25 Lovers"	Jennifer Rush; Rouge; Mende	Rouge; Mende	3:37
4.	"Nobody Move"	Patrick Henderson; Richard Feldmann; Marcy Levy	Henderson; Feldmann; Levy	3:32
5.	"Never Gonna Turn Back Again"	Rush	Rouge; Mende	3:28
6.	"Surrender"	Rush	Erich Klapperton	3:15
7.	"Ring of Ice"	Rush; Rouge; Mende	Rouge; Mende	3:50
8.	"Into My Dreams"	Rush; Rouge; Mende	Rouge; Mende	3:50
9.	"I See a Shadow (Not a Fantasy)"	Rush	Rouge; Mende	4:20
10.	"Come Give Me Your Hand"	Rush; Rouge; Mende	Rouge; Mende	3:49
11.	"The Power of Love"	Rush; Applegate	Rouge; Mende	6:00

== Charts ==
=== Weekly charts ===
Weekly chart performance for Jennifer Rush
Chart (1985–1986)	Peak position
Australian Albums (Kent Music Report)	10
Austrian Albums (Ö3 Austria)	5
Dutch Albums (Album Top 100)	29
European Albums (Eurotipsheet)	8
Finnish Albums (Suomen virallinen lista)	6
German Albums (Offizielle Top 100)	2
New Zealand Albums (RMNZ)	14
Norwegian Albums (VG-lista)	1
Spanish Albums (PROMUSICAE)	1
Swedish Albums (Sverigetopplistan)	2
Swiss Albums (Schweizer Hitparade)	3
UK Albums (Official Charts)	7

=== Year-end charts ===
1985 year-end chart performance for Jennifer Rush
Chart (1985)	Position
German Albums (Offizielle Top 100)	6
Norwegian Fall Period Albums (VG-lista)	5
UK Albums (Gallup)	55

1986 year-end chart performance for Jennifer Rush
Chart (1986)	Position
Austrian Albums (Ö3 Austria)	12
European Albums (Music & Media)	19
German Albums (Offizielle Top 100)	15
UK Albums (Gallup)	92

== Certifications ==
Certifications for Jennifer Rush
Region	Certification	Certified units/sales
Australia (ARIA)	Gold	35,000^{^}
Austria (IFPI Austria)	Gold	25,000^{*}
Germany (BVMI)	2× Platinum	1,000,000^{^}
New Zealand (RMNZ)	Platinum	15,000^{^}
Norway (IFPI Norway)	Platinum	100,000
Sweden (GLF)	Platinum	100,000^{^}
Switzerland (IFPI Switzerland)	Platinum	50,000^{^}
United Kingdom (BPI)	Platinum	300,000^{^}
^{*} Sales figures based on certification alone.^{^} Shipments figures based on certification alone.

== Release history ==
Country	Date	Format	Label	Cat. No.	Ref.
West Germany	October 1984	LP; Cassette	CBS	CBS 26177; 40-26177	
Switzerland	October 1984	LP; Cassette	CBS	CBS 26177; 40-26177	
Germany	1985	CD	CBS	CBSCD 26177	
Sweden	August 1985	LP; Cassette	CBS		
United Kingdom	4 November 1985	LP; Cassette	CBS	CBS 26488; 40-26488	
United Kingdom	23 December 1985	CD	CBS	CBSCD 26488	
Netherlands	November 1985	LP; Cassette	CBS		
Australia and New Zealand	November 1985	LP; Cassette	CBS	SBP 8131; PC 8131	
Austria	December 1985	LP; Cassette	CBS		
Japan	21 December 1985	LP; Cassette	Epic International	28•3P-701; 28•6P-359	
Japan	21 April 1986	CD	Epic International	32•8P-122	
Spain (Reissue)	1986	LP; Cassette	CBS	S 26914; 40-26914	
Germany	16 April 2021	LP (Clear Vinyl)	Sony Music	0190759703618	
