= Movin' (Jennifer Rush album) =

Studio album by Jennifer Rush
- Released: October 1985
- Genres: Pop, synthpop, pop rock
- Length: 36:24
- Label: CBS Records
- Producers: Candy DeRouge, Gunther Mende

Jennifer Rush chronology
Jennifer Rush (1984)	Movin' (1985)	Heart Over Mind (1987)

Alternative cover
- UK album cover, released in 1986

Singles from Movin'
- 1. "Destiny" Released: September 1985; 2. "If You're Ever Gonna Lose My Love" Released: March 1986

Movin' is the second studio album by American singer Jennifer Rush.

== Overview ==
Following the success of her debut album, Jennifer continued to work with Candy DeRouge and Gunther Mende, who had produced her first album. Out of the ten songs on the album, seven were co-written by Jennifer with DeRouge and Mende, while another song, "Live Wire", was co-written by Jennifer with Tony Carey. Another song included on the album is an electronic-working cover of Stevie Wonder's song "Yester-Me, Yester-You, Yesterday".

In some countries the Jennifer Rush debut album was a cross section of tracks from Jennifer Rush (1984) and Movin' , either titled Jennifer Rush (US, Canada, German Democratic Republic) or Movin' (Venezuela, Singapore).

== Commercial performance ==
Movin' was a huge success in West Germany upon its release in October 1985. The album reached the top spot of the album chart in its third week of availability. It went on to stay at no. 1 for 13 consecutive weeks and was in the top 10 for a total of 29 consecutive weeks. Movin' ultimately spent 65 weeks in the Top 100 of the German Album Chart. Its success led to the album becoming the highest-selling album of 1986. To date, Movin' has sold 1.5 million copies in Germany and is the highest-selling album of her career in this country.

Movin' was successful throughout Europe. In Switzerland, the album debuted at no. 2 in October 1985 and reach the top spot two months later. It stayed at no. 1 for 2 weeks and spent 19 weeks in the top 10. In Norway, Movin' became Jennifer's second no. 1 album and spent 2 weeks at the top position of the chart. The album also reached no. 1 in Sweden for one week in March 1986. In Austria, the album was in the top 10 for seven weeks and peaked at no. 8. Movin' also reached the top 10 in Finland.

The album saw more modest success in the Netherlands where it reached no. 25 and spent 11 weeks in the top 100.

Despite her debut album being Platinum-certified in the United Kingdom, Movin' struggled to find the same success, stalling at no. 32 and spending a total of 5 weeks in the top 100. It was also a commercial flop in Australia, where it peaked at no. 96, despite her debut album reaching top 10 there. The lack of success was largely due to the lack of a hit single in these countries.

US success still eluded Rush and thus following the release of this album she decided to relocate to the US from Germany in order to secure a wider fanbase for her next album, Heart Over Mind.

== Singles ==
- "Destiny" was the first single from the album. It reached the top 5 of the singles charts in West Germany, Austria and Switzerland, as well as the top 30 in Belgium and Netherlands.
- "If You're Ever Gonna Lose My Love" was the second single, and reached the top 30 in West Germany and top 20 in Austria and Finland.
- "Live Wire" received an official single release in South Africa.

In addition to the official singles, some album tracks also received radio airplay:

- "Ave Maria" received airplay in West Germany by early 1986. It received adds in Sweden in March 1986 and in Poland in July 1986.
- "Live Wire" received adds in Greece in March 1986.

== Track listing ==
Movin' track listing
No.	Title	Lyrics	Music	Length
1.	"Destiny"	Jennifer Rush; M.D. Clinic	Candy de Rouge; Gunther Mende	3:35
2.	"Live Wire"	Rush; Tony Carey	Carey	3:50
3.	"Silent Killer"	Rush; Clinic	Rouge; Mende	3:34
4.	"Automatic"	Mark Mangold; Suzanne Mangold	Mark Mangold; Suzanne Mangold	3:29
5.	"If You're Ever Gonna Lose My Love"	Rush; Clinic	Rouge; Mende	3:50
6.	"Ave Maria (Survivors of a Different Kind)"	Rush; Mary Susan Applegate; Clinic	Rouge; Mende	3:48
7.	"Testify with My Heart"	Rush	Rouge; Mende	3:18
8.	"Yester-Me, Yester-You, Yesterday" (Stevie Wonder cover)	Ronald Miller; Bryan Wells	Ronald Miller; Bryan Wells	3:15
9.	"The Right Time Has Come Now"	Rush	Rouge; Mende	4:01
10.	"Hero of a Fool"	Rush; Applegate; M.D. Clinic	Rouge; Mende	3:37

- Spanish LP and Cassette pressings include a Spanish re-recording of "If You're Ever Gonna Lose My Love" titled "No Me Canso De Pensar En Ti", which is placed as the first track on the album while the original English version is placed as track 11.
- M.D. Clinic is a pseudonym used by producers Gunther Mende and Candy de Rouge in the writing credits.

== Charts ==
=== Weekly charts ===
Weekly chart performance for Movin'
Chart (1985–1986)	Peak position
Australian Albums (Kent Music Report)	96
Austrian Albums (Ö3 Austria)	8
Dutch Albums (Album Top 100)	25
European Albums (Music & Media)	16
Finnish Albums (Suomen virallinen lista)	9
German Albums (Offizielle Top 100)	1
Norwegian Albums (VG-lista)	1
Swedish Albums (Sverigetopplistan)	1
Swiss Albums (Schweizer Hitparade)	1
UK Albums (Official Charts)	32

=== Year-end charts ===
1985 year-end chart performance for Movin'
Chart (1985)	Position
German Albums (Offizielle Top 100)	59

1986 year-end chart performance for Movin'
Chart (1986)	Position
Austrian Albums (Ö3 Austria)	13
European Albums (Music & Media)	26
German Albums (Offizielle Top 100)	1
Swiss Albums (Schweizer Hitparade)	7

== Certifications ==
Certifications for Movin'
Region	Certification	Certified units/sales
Germany (BVMI)	3× Platinum	1,500,000^{^}
Norway (IFPI Norway)	Gold	50,000
Sweden (GLF)	Gold	50,000^{^}
Switzerland (IFPI Switzerland)	Platinum	50,000^{^}
^{^} Shipments figures based on certification alone.

== Release history ==
Region	Date	Label	Format(s)	Cat. No.	Ref.
West Germany	October 1985	CBS			
Austria	November 1985	CBS			
Switzerland	November 1985	CBS			
Sweden	January 1986	CBS			
Netherlands	February 1986	CBS			
Norway	February 1986	CBS			
United Kingdom	21 April 1986	CBS	LP; Cassette	CBS 26710; 40-26710	
United Kingdom	2 June 1986	CBS	CD	CDCBS 26710	
Europe	26 September 2025	Sony Music	LP (Silver-coloured vinyl)	19802864801	
