= Jennifer Rush =

American pop singer and songwriter (born 1960)

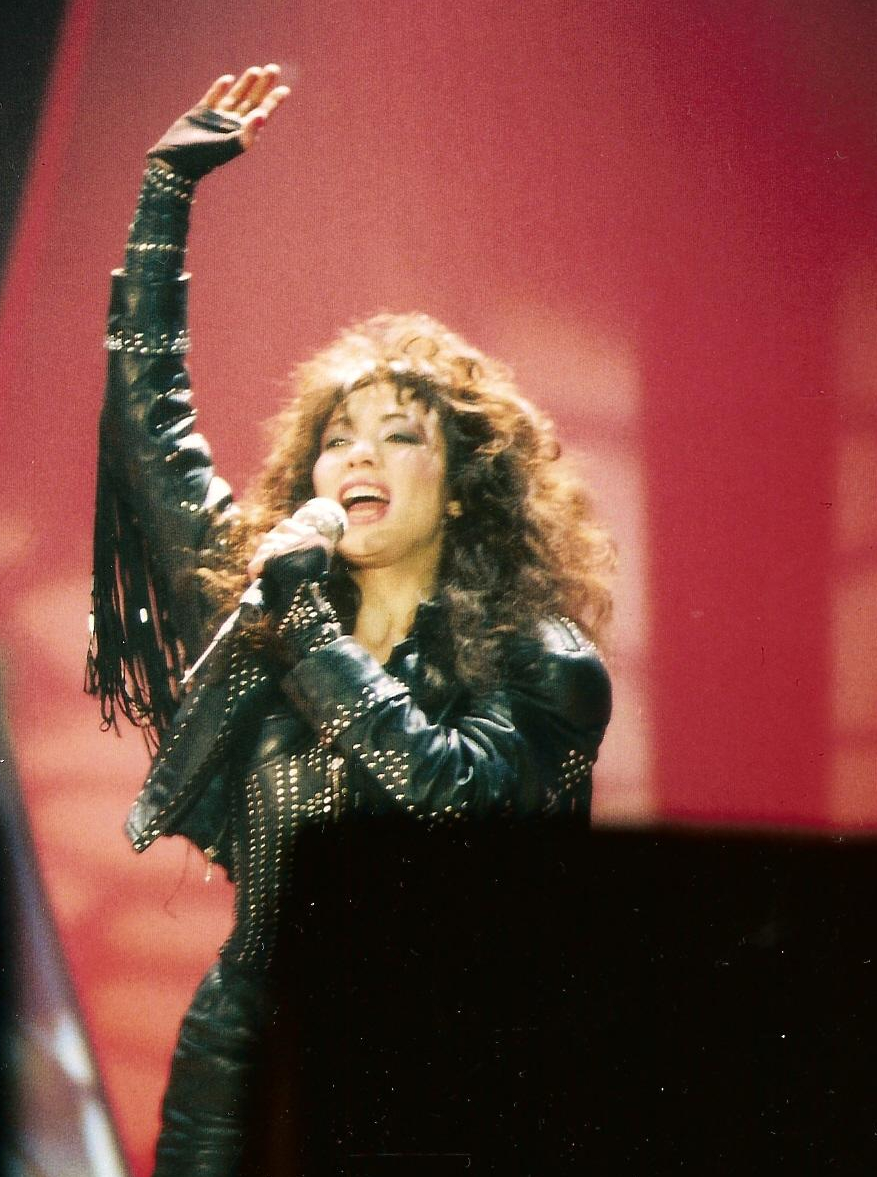
- Rush performing in 1988
- Born: Heidi Stern; September 28, 1960 (age 66); New York, New York, U.S.
- Education: Juilliard School; Harvard University (no degree)
- Occupations: Singer; songwriter
- Years active: 1979–present
- Known for: "The Power of Love"; "Destiny"; "Flames of Paradise"; "Ring of Ice"; "I Come Undone"
- Musical career
- Genres: Pop; pop rock
- Labels: CBS; Columbia; EMI; Virgin; Sony Music; Rockbird Music
- Website: jennifer-rush.com

Jennifer Rush (born Heidi Stern; September 28, 1960) is an American pop and rock singer. She achieved initial success during the mid-1980s with several singles and studio albums, including the million-selling single "The Power of Love", which she co-wrote and released in 1984. Her initial greatest success came in Europe, especially the United Kingdom. Her other successful singles from that period include "Ring of Ice", "Destiny", "I Come Undone", "You're My One and Only", "Higher Ground", "25 Lovers", "If You're Ever Gonna Lose My Love", "Heart over Mind", and "Flames of Paradise", a duet with Elton John. In the 1990s she had several charting singles, including "Tears in the Rain".

== Early life ==
Rush was born Heidi Stern in the New York City borough of Queens, daughter of singer Barbara and opera singer Maurice Stern. She has two older brothers, Robert "Bobby" Stern and Stephen "Stevie" Stern (both professional musicians). Rush and her brothers lived with their mother until she was a toddler, and then with their father and his second wife on the Upper West Side of the borough of Manhattan. Rush studied violin at the Juilliard School and also took piano lessons, although she did not enjoy these instruments and instead took to playing the guitar in private. When Rush was nine, the Stern family moved to Germany. Rush returned to the United States a few years later to live with her mother's family. She also lived for a time in Seattle, Washington, when her father was briefly a professor of voice at the University of Washington.

== Career ==
Rush's debut studio album, titled with her legal name of Heidi Stern, was released locally in Seattle, Washington, in 1979. After meeting singer, songwriter, and producer Gene McDaniels in Seattle, she went to Los Angeles to record demo songs with him. In 1982, following McDaniels's persistence, Rush moved to Wiesbaden, Germany, where her father was an opera singer for a short period of time. She was then advised to change her name, which she did legally.

=== CBS Records (1982–1991) ===
==== Early singles and debut studio album (1984) ====
Rush's debut single with CBS Records International was "Tonight", which was released in West Germany under her birth name of Heidi Stern in 1982. The single did not enter any charts and she changed her stage name to Jennifer Rush the following year. In 1983, Rush released her first two singles under her new stage name, titled "Into My Dreams" and "Come Give Me Your Hand", both of which Rush co-wrote with producers Gunther Mende and Candy DeRouge. Neither song entered the music charts. In February and March 1984, Rush toured with the Berlin Philharmonic on a series of James Bond-themed concerts. She performed covers of "Goldfinger", "The Man with the Golden Gun", "For Your Eyes Only" and "Thunderball" at the concerts, and astonished the audience with her singing.

Rush's chart breakthrough came with the single "25 Lovers", which entered the West German singles chart in June 1984, spending 20 weeks on the chart and reaching its highest position at number 25. Her next hit single was "Ring of Ice", which entered the German singles chart in October 1984 and peaked at number 22. As with her first two singles, these songs were co-written by Rush with producers Gunther Mende and Candy deRouge. Mende and DeRouge were the producers behind Rush's debut album Jennifer Rush, released in West Germany in October 1984. Rush herself co-wrote eight of the ten songs on the album, and other songwriters included Mary Susan Applegate, Patrick Henderson, Richard Feldmann, Marcy Levy and Eric Klapperton.

The most famous song from the album was "The Power of Love". Initially this song was released as the fifth and final single from the album in January 1985 in West Germany, where it initially peaked at number 16 on the German Singles Chart. "The Power of Love" found greater success in the United Kingdom, where the song was released in June 1985. The song was a "sleeper hit", spending 16 weeks on the UK Singles Chart before finally topping the chart in October. It spent five consecutive weeks at the top of the UK Singles Chart and ultimately became Britain's best-selling song of 1985. It was listed in the Guinness Book of World Records at the time as the best-selling single by a female solo artist in the history of the British music industry. "The Power of Love" held that status until 1992, when it was outsold by Whitney Houston's "I Will Always Love You".

Following the song's success in the United Kingdom, "The Power of Love" was released as single throughout the rest of the world in 1985 and 1986. It reached number one on the charts in Australia, Austria, Canada, Ireland, New Zealand, Norway, Portugal and South Africa, as well as in Spain with a Spanish re-recording titled "Si Tu Eres Mi Hombre Y Yo Tu Mujer". The single additionally reached the top 10 of the charts in Belgium, Finland, Greece, Netherlands, Sweden and Switzerland. The single was however less successful in the United States, where it peaked at number 57 on the US Billboard Hot 100 chart.

Rush's debut album was a big success in West Germany, where it spent 97 weeks on the chart and peaked twice at number 2 throughout its chart run. The album hit number one in both Spain and Norway, spending five and ten weeks at the top respectively. The album additionally achieved top 10 placements in Australia, Austria, Finland, Sweden, Switzerland and the United Kingdom. By late 1988, the album sold three million copies worldwide.

==== Movin' (1985) ====
Rush's second album, Movin', was released in West Germany in October 1985. She again worked with producers Gunther Mende and Candy DeRouge, as well as songwriter Mary Susan Applegate, and herself co-wrote eight of the ten songs on the album. Other writers were Tony Carey, Mark Mangold and Suzanne Mangold. Additionally, the album contained a cover of the song "Yester-Me, Yester-You, Yesterday", originally by Stevie Wonder.

The album was a huge success in West Germany, where it stayed at number one for thirteen consecutive weeks and spent 65 weeks on the chart in total. It was certified triple platinum for shipments of 1.5 million copies and was the most successful album in the country of 1986. The album also found success throughout the rest of Europe. It reached number one in Norway, Sweden and Switzerland and attained a gold or platinum certification in all three countries. The album was also in the top 10 of the charts in Austria and Finland, the top 30 in the Netherlands and top 40 in the United Kingdom.

The album's first single "Destiny" was top five hit in West Germany, Austria and Switzerland. It also reached the top 30 in Belgium and Netherlands, but performed poorly in the United Kingdom. The second and final single "If You're Ever Gonna Lose My Love" charted in the top 20 in Austria and Finland, and the top 30 in West Germany. This song was Rush's second single to be re-recorded in Spanish, and was re-titled "No Me Canso De Pensar En Ti".

Jennifer won the Goldene Europa prize in 1985.

==== Heart over Mind (1987) ====
For the recording of her third album Heart over Mind, Rush relocated from Germany to the United States. On this album Rush worked with American producers and songwriters Desmond Child, Bruce Roberts, Andy Goldmark, Ellen Shipley, Morrie Brown, Taylor Rhodes, Tom DeLuca, Tom Whitlock, Rick Nowels, Mark Radice, and Michael Bolton. Additionally, German producer Harold Faltermeyer and British producer Gus Dudgeon also worked on the album. There was also guitar work from Richie Sambora of Bon Jovi.

In her most successful market, West Germany, Heart over Mind was her second number one album, and stayed at the top position for nine consecutive weeks and remained on the charts for 53 weeks. It was the second most successful album of 1987 in the country, behind U2's The Joshua Tree. The album was also certified double platinum for shipments of one million copies.

The album also found success in other European countries. In Switzerland, the album was number one for three weeks and certified platinum. The album was also certified platinum in Sweden. Top 10 positions were achieved in Austria, Finland and Norway. The album also managed to reach the top 40 in Canada and received a gold certification there. The album failed to make a large impact in the United States, where it only reached number 118 on the Billboard 200.

The album's first single was a cover of the Ellen Shipley song "I Come Undone", which reached the top 10 in Poland, Switzerland and South Africa, and the top 20 in Finland and West Germany. The second single was the Elton John duet "Flames of Paradise", which became the album's biggest hit. It reached the top 10 in Switzerland and West Germany, and the top 20 in Canada and New Zealand. It was also Rush's highest charting single on the Billboard Hot 100, reaching number 36. The album's third single, "Heart over Mind", reached the top 30 in Austria, West Germany and Switzerland, and also entered the dance charts in the United States.

==== Passion (1988) and Wings of Desire (1989) ====
Rush's last studio two albums with CBS Records International were Passion in 1988 and Wings of Desire in 1989.

For Passion, Harold Faltermeyer and Michael Bolton once again produced and/or co-wrote some songs for Rush. Most of the writers and producers had not worked on Rush's previous albums. These included Bob Halligan Jr., Chuck Wild, Ric Wake, Michael Omartian, Diane Warren, Keith Forsey, and Jellybean.

CBS initially had high expectations for Passion. The album had 340,000 pre-release orders in Germany, the largest ever ship-out for an album released by CBS records at the time. In the long run, the album ultimately shipped 500,000 copies, achieving a platinum certification but falling short of the 1 to 1.5 million copies shipped individually by the first three albums. Passion peaked at number three in West Germany and stayed on the albums chart for 22 weeks. Outside of Germany, the album was most successful in Switzerland where it reached number four and achieved a gold certification. The album also reached the top 10 in Sweden, the top 20 in Finland and the top 30 in Austria.

The only charting single from Passion was "You're My One and Only", which reached the top 30 in Switzerland and West Germany. The second and third singles, "Keep All the Fires Burning Bright" and "Love Get Ready", failed to enter any music charts.

Jennifer contributed vocals to the 1988 Mandoki album Strangers in a Paradise.

In 1989, Rush recorded a duet with Placido Domingo, "Till I Loved You". The single reached the top 30 in the United Kingdom, Rush's first top 40 entry in the country since "Ring of Ice".

On her next studio album Wings of Desire, Jennifer worked with new writers and producers who were not involved on earlier albums, with the exception of Michael Bolton and Bob Halligan Jr. Producers on this album were Christopher Neil, Phil Ramone and Michael J. Powell. Songwriters included Amy Sky, Bruce Gaitsch, Jackie Rawe, Alfie Zappacosta, Graham Shaw, Tomas Ledin, Felix Weber, and David Palmer.

By the end of the 1980s, Rush had hit the US Hot 100 chart two times; "The Power of Love" reaching number 57 in 1985 and "Flames of Paradise" (a duet with Elton John) reaching number 36 in 1987.

A compilation album, The Power of Jennifer Rush, was released in 1991. The album reached the top 40 of the charts in Austria, Germany and Switzerland.

=== EMI and Virgin (1992–1999) ===
Through the 1990s, Rush released four albums, three with EMI.

==== Jennifer Rush (1992) ====
In 1992 Jennifer released her first album with EMI Records, in joint distribution with Electrola, which was self-titled. Songwriters on the album included Rick Nowels, Ellen Shipley, Desmond Child, Denise Rich and Alan Barton, as well as Jennifer herself who co-wrote two songs. Four of the songs were re-recorded in Spanish for the Spanish edition of the album released in 1993. The album only charted in Germany, Austria and Switzerland, reaching top-40 positions in all three countries and was her lowest charting album in Germany at the time, being her first to miss the Top 30. All three singles from the album did however chart in the Top 100 of the singles chart. Jennifer also received a nomination for National Female Rock/Pop Artist at the 1993 Echo Music Prize awards.

==== Out of My Hands (1995) ====
Jennifer's second EMI/Electrola album Out of My Hands was released in February 1995. Like her previous album, it only charted in Germany, Austria and Switzerland, but was able to achieve higher chart positions than her 1992 album. Out of My Hands reached the Top-30 in all countries and peaked at number 15 in Germany, becoming her first Top-20 album in the country since Wings of Desire. The album included the single "Tears in the Rain", a cover of the Robin Beck song, which charted in Germany and Switzerland, and was her highest charting single in both countries in the 1990s decade. The album also included covers of "Who Wants to Live Forever" by Queen and "Nights in White Satin" by The Moody Blues. Songwriters on the album included Diane Warren, Desmond Child, Michael Bolton, Taylor Rhodes, who all worked with Jennifer on earlier albums, as well as Jon Secada, David Austin, Russ DeSalvo and Robert White Johnson who all worked with Jennifer for the first time on this album.

==== Credo (1997) and Classics (1998) ====
Jennifer's eighth studio album Credo was released in March 1997. The following year she released Classics, a collection of re-recordings of songs originally released in the 1980s with four newly written songs co-written by Rush.

=== 2000 to present ===
A box set, Stronghold – The Collector's Hit Box, was released in August 2007. This compilation included all of Rush's singles from 1982 to 1991 (with the first record company that signed her), and in their extended versions as available. It also included all the B-sides and other rare or unreleased tracks (among them four James Bond theme songs, recorded live in 1984 and only released in a very limited edition by the Berlin Philharmonic).

In March 2009, she announced on her official website that she had signed a recording contract with Sony Music/Ariola for one album. That album would be Now Is the Hour, released in 2010. This marked a return to the recording label where she had made her international breakthrough in the 1980s and on which she had released the first five studio albums of her career. Now Is the Hour was released on March 5, 2010, in most of Europe, with minimal input from the label and on March 8, 2010, in the UK. The album failed to chart in the US or the UK, but reached number 21 on the German Albums charts.

== Awards and nominations ==
Year	Organisation	Category	Work	Result	Ref.
1985	Goldene Europa	Goldene Europa	Herself	Won	
1993	Echo Music Prize	National Female Rock/Pop Artist	Herself	Nominated	
1998	Echo Music Prize	Best Female Artist (National)	Herself	Nominated	

== Discography ==
Studio albums

- Heidi (1979) (as Heidi Stern)
- Jennifer Rush (1984)
- Jennifer Rush: International Version (1985)
- Movin' (1985)
- Heart over Mind (1987)
- Passion (1988)
- Wings of Desire (1989)
- Jennifer Rush (1992)
- Out of My Hands (1995)
- Credo (1997)
- Classics (1998)
- Now Is the Hour (2010)
