= Gunther Mende =

German record producer (born 1952)

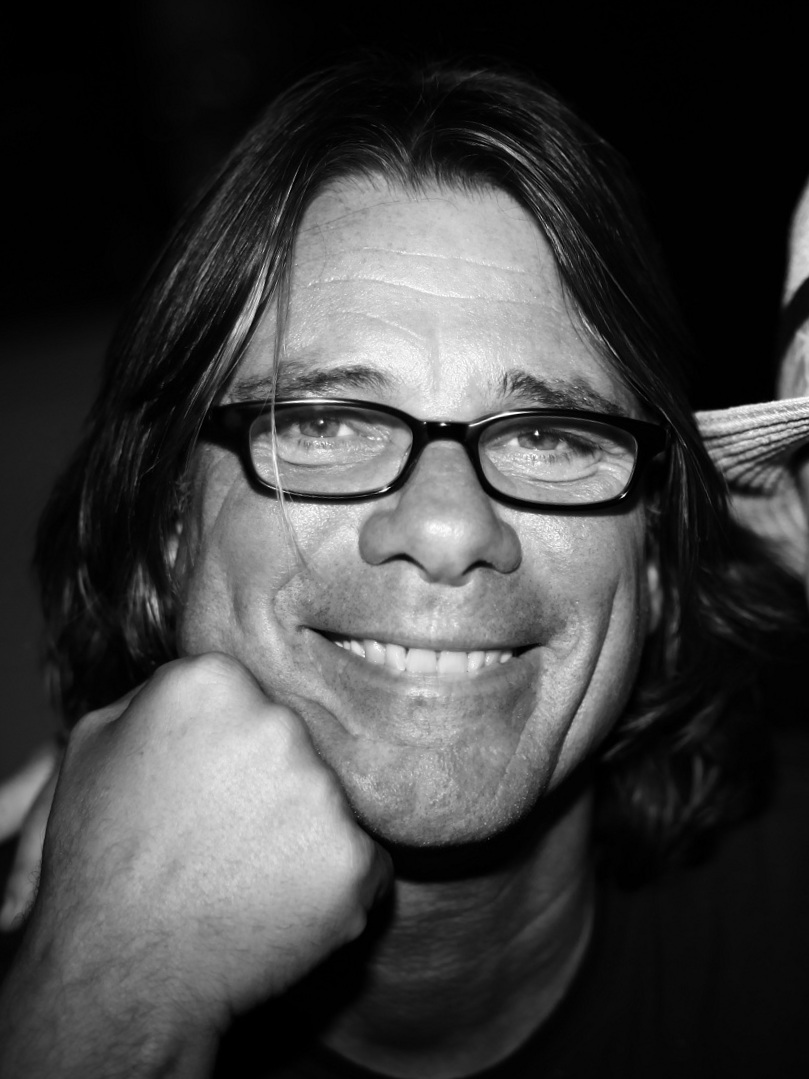
Mende in 2009

Gunther Mende (born 4 June 1952 in Wiesbaden) is a German record producer.

== Life ==
He was six years old when he received his first set of drums. From that point on he loved music. After his Abitur in Mainz, his main subjects were germanistics, politics and philosophy, he worked as a mason and sculptor in the family company. After school, he earned his first money playing the drums in bands all through Germany. In 1976, CBS Frankfurt gave him the opportunity to work as a staff producer. He produced Red Baron with the frontman Candy DeRouge, with whom he continued working after the band broke up. He started writing songs for different kinds of groups and solo artists, like Roy Black and Tommy Steiner, before he discovered Jennifer Rush, which proved pivotal for him.

In 1994, he sold his recording studios and moved to Cyprus, where he built his own house. Gunther Mende's main residence is in Cyprus, though he periodically lives in Tirol. He was married to Korean pianist Mee Eun Kim.

== Work ==
He produced stars like Falco, Jennifer Rush and Tina Turner. Other European Groups he produced were Culcha Candela, Jan Vogler, Udo Lindenberg, Mireille Mathieu, Nena, Sally Oldfield, Helen Schneider, Anna Maria Kaufmann, Cassandra Steen, Bonnie Bianco, Bobby Kimball, Samy Deluxe, The Boss Hoss, Peter Maffay, Sabrina Weckerlin, Sarah Connor, DJ Ötzi, Roger Cicero, Aloha from Hell and David Garrett.

He began working with Jennifer Rush in 1984, going on to produce two of her albums with Candy de Rouge. The first of these two, Rush's self-titled debut, included well-known songs like "Ring of Ice", "25 Lovers", "Destiny", and the seminal and oft-covered hit "The Power of Love", all of which became mainstays on the charts, where the songs stayed up to 30 weeks.

By 1985, the Jennifer Rush album had reached the number two position on the German charts. The following year, Rush's follow-up album, Movin' reached number one, later becoming album of the year. Both LPs were on the first and second chart position at the same time and have been successfully published in 16 different countries worldwide. They reached platinum and triple platinum and many different awards.

1994 Gunther Mende produced Nena's album Und alles dreht sich.

1999–2001 he worked as a production adviser and publisher for the "Rilke-Projekt" in which Rainer Maria Rilkes poems were read out loud by Mario Adorf, Peter Ustinov, Jessica Schwarz und Peter Maffay. These records have been underlaid with music and this project received a lot of awards too.

2007, 2008 and 2009 Gunther Mende developed "Dein Song", a songwriter contest, for German television with his partner Alfred Bayer from the German production company BSB Film Wiesbaden. He was in the jury together with Joja Wendt, Johanna Klum, Frank Ziegler, Elin Skrzipczyk and Nadja Benaissa.

2009 he produced the album "Beyond" together with his wife Mee Eun Kim. On this album prayers were declaimed by Regula Curti, Dechen Shak-Dagsay and Tina Turner. This CD was published by Universal Classic, was released in the US, Canada, Japan and Korea and received platinum in Switzerland.

Besides the treasured American ASCAP-Pop Awards, which was lent in Los Angeles, he received 17 gold, 12 platinum and three double platinum albums. He was also nominated for a Grammy for Celine Dion's 1993 rendition of "The Power of Love".

In 2010, Mende returned to the charts with The Spirit Never Dies, a posthumous album from the late Austrian singer/musician Falco, featuring unreleased songs. Peaking at number one in Austria, the album reached number three on the German album charts, receiving both gold and platinum certification.
