= Candy DeRouge =

German music producer and songwriter

- Born: Wolfgang Detmann
- Origin: Germany
- Genre: Pop
- Occupations: Record producer; composer; arranger; remixer
- Instruments: Keyboards; Programming
- Years active: 1980–present
- Website: Cooltownstudio.com

Wolfgang Detmann, better known as Candy de Rouge (sometimes credited as Alexandre DeRouge), is a German (born in Bad Neustadt an der Saale) producer and songwriter. He has worked extensively with the likes of Jennifer Rush, Celine Dion, Bonnie Bianco, Laura Branigan, Thomas Anders, Chris Norman, Falco, Helen Schneider, Sally Oldfield, The Window Speaks, Sue Schell and other international artists. He has been credited with co-writing "The Power of Love," which became a massive international success as a single for Rush, Branigan and Dion.

He has more recently being involved with the projects of the Cooltown Studio.
