= List of songs recorded by Jennifer Rush =

This is an alphabetical listing of songs recorded by singer Jennifer Rush.

The earliest songs listed are from 1979 when she recorded songs under her birth name Heidi Stern. She later changed her stage name to Jennifer Rush in 1983. Jennifer's discography includes 11 studio albums (including her 1979 album Heidi) as well numerous non-LP tracks and collaborations. Jennifer has also co-written many songs in her career, particularly on her first two 1980s albums.

Most of Jennifer's songs are recorded in English, but occasionally she re-recorded songs in Spanish and has also recorded songs written in German and Hungarian.

== Songs ==
Key
•	Indicates single release
†	Indicates Spanish re-recording

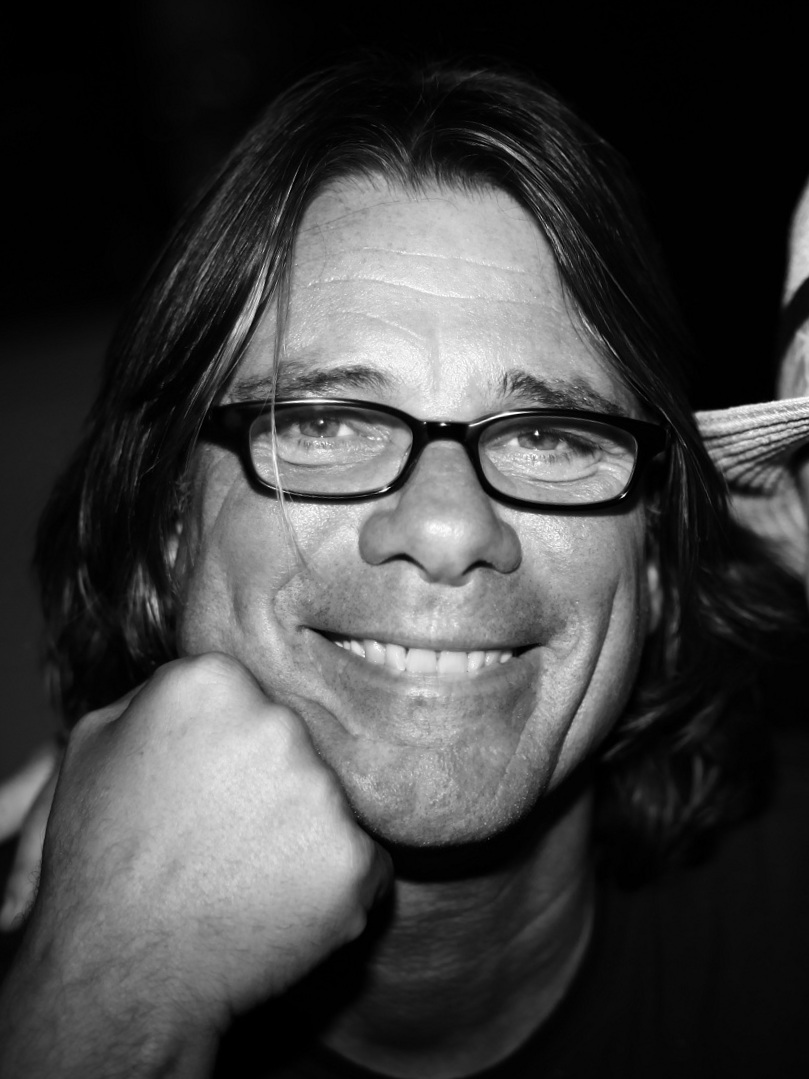
Producer and songwriter Gunther Mende who co-wrote numerous songs on Jennifer's first two albums, including her signature song "The Power of Love" and the hit singles "25 Lovers", "Ring of Ice", "Destiny" and "If You're Ever Gonna Lose My Love".

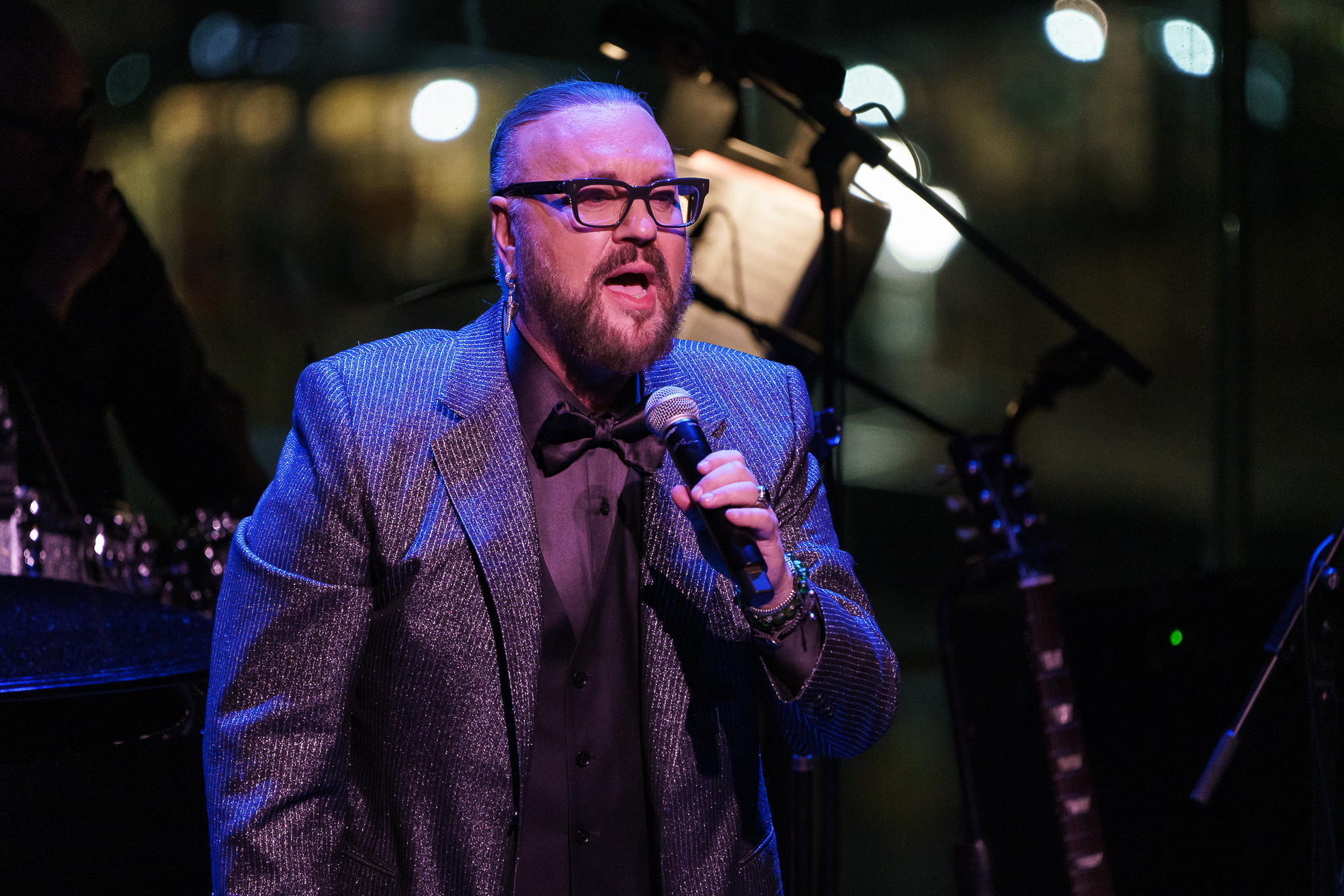
Songwriter and producer Desmond Child, who wrote multiple songs for the albums Heart over Mind, Jennifer Rush (1992) and Out of My Hands including the single "Tears in the Rain".

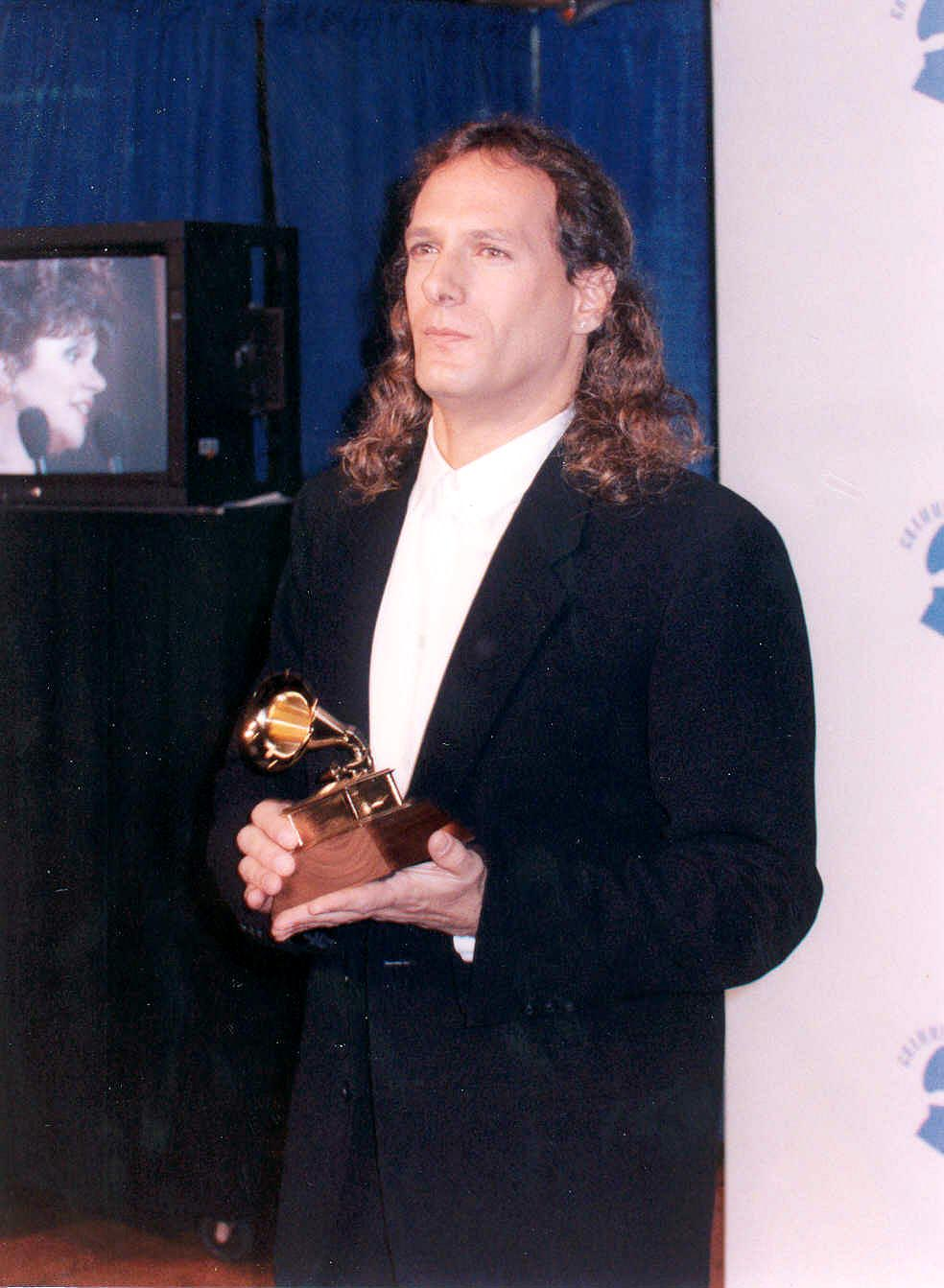
Singer-songwriter Michael Bolton, who wrote a number of songs for the albums Heart over Mind, Passion, Wings of Desire and Out of My Hands, including the duet "Same Heart" for the album Passion and the single "Love Get Ready".

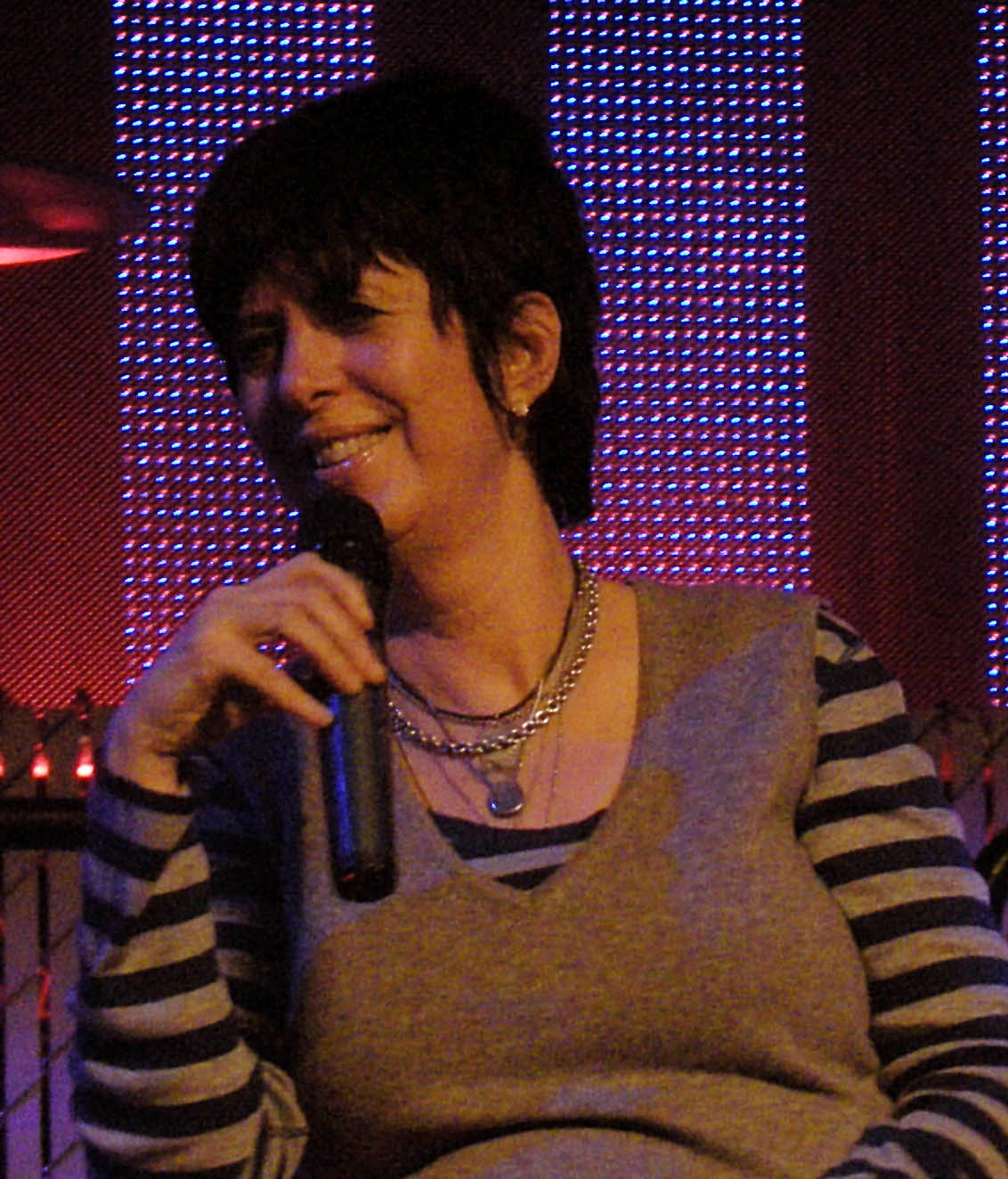
Songwriter Diane Warren, who wrote multiple songs for Jennifer's albums Passion and Out of My Hands, including the single "Tears in the Rain".

Name of song, lyrics writers/music writers, album and year of release
Song	Lyric writer(s)	Music writer(s)	Album	Year	Ref.
"25 Lovers" •	Jennifer Rush; Candy de Rouge; Gunther Mende	Candy de Rouge; Gunther Mende	Jennifer Rush (1984); Classics	1984; 1998	
"A Broken Heart" •	Dave Dunhill; Mick Dash; Alan Barton; Jennifer Rush (Additional Lyrics)	Dave Dunhill; Mick Dash; Alan Barton	Jennifer Rush	1992	
"A Touch of Paradise" (John Farnham cover)	Gulliver Smith; Ross Wilson		Credo	1997	
"Ain't Loved You Long Enough"	Steve Lee; Tim Woodcock; Steve Anderson		Now Is the Hour	2010	
"All I Want is You"	Jennifer Rush; Laszlo Mándoki; Laszlo Bencker; Peter Zizzo		Classics	1998	
"All in Love is Fair" (Stevie Wonder cover)	Stevie Wonder		Credo	1997	
"Amor Sin Final" † (Timeless Love)	Elena Casols (Spanish Lyrics); Desmond Child	Desmond Child	Jennifer Rush (1992) (Spanish Edition)	1993	
"Angel"	Jennifer Rush; Phil Ramone	Tomas Ledin	Wings of Desire	1989	
"Another Way" •	Tom Whitlock	Giorgio Moroder	Another Way (Note: Later included on the 2007 compilation Stronghold - The Collector's Hit Box) (Soundtrack)	1988	
"Automatic"	Mark Mangold; Suzanne Gold		Movin'	1985	
"Ave Maria (Survivors of a Different Kind)" •	Jennifer Rush; Mary Susan Applegate; Candy de Rouge; Gunther Mende	Candy de Rouge; Gunther Mende	Movin'	1985	
"Ave Maria" † (Note: The 1998 re-recorded version of this song was sung in Spanish.)	Jennifer Rush; Mary Susan Applegate; Candy de Rouge; Gunther Mende	Candy de Rouge; Gunther Mende	Classics	1998	
"Az Utazás Végén" ("The End of a Journey" Hungarian version)	Tamás Orbán (Hungarian Lyrics); Jennifer Rush; Laszlo Mándoki; Laszlo Bencker; Peter Zizzo	Jennifer Rush; Laszlo Mándoki; Laszlo Bencker; Peter Zizzo	Classics (Hungarian Edition)	1998	
"Before the Dawn" •	Tony Swain; Harriet Roberts		Now Is the Hour	2010	
"Betcha Never"	Alan Ross; David James; Natasha Bedingfield		Now Is the Hour	2010	
"Call My Name" (Michael Bolton cover)	Jennifer Rush; Michael Bolton; Mark Radice	Michael Bolton; Mark Radice	Heart over Mind	1987	
"Carne de Amor" † (I'm in It for Love)	Carols Toro (Spanish Lyrics); Andy Goldmark; Patrick Henderson	Andy Goldmark; Patrick Henderson	Jennifer Rush (1992) (Spanish Edition)	1993	
"Closer" • (Dominic Ghanbar featuring Jennifer Rush)	Dominic Ghanbar		Non-album single	2021	
"Come Back"	Jim Wolfe		Heidi	1979	
"Come Give Me Your Hand" •	Heidi Stern; Candy de Rouge; Gunther Mende	Candy de Rouge; Gunther Mende	Jennifer Rush (1984)	1984	
"Crazy 'Bout You"	Albert Hammond; Andy Goldmark		Out of My Hands	1995	
"Credo" •	Frank Musker; Richard Darbyshire		Credo	1997	
"Credo" † (Versión En Castellano)	Frank Musker; Richard Darbyshire		Credo (Spanish Edition)	1997	
"Cry"	Duncan Pain		Wings of Desire	1989	
"Cry, Baby..."	Joachim Bauer; Roland Baumgartner		Out of My Hands	1995	
"Das Farbenspiel Des Winds" •	Stephen Swartz (Original Lyrics); Frank Lenart (German Lyrics)	Alan Menken	Pocahontas (Film Soundtrack • Deutsche Originalversion)	1995	
"Deeper Within" (Geoffrey Williams cover)	Geoffrey Williams; Simon Stirling		Credo	1997	
"Destiny" •	Jennifer Rush; Candy de Rouge; Gunther Mende	Candy de Rouge; Gunther Mende	Movin'; Classics	1985; 1998	
"Down on My Knees"	Niara Scarlett; Fridolin Tai; Frederik Nordsø Schjoldan		Now Is the Hour	2010	
"Down to You"	Jennifer Rush; Desmond Child		Heart over Mind	1987	
"Dream Awake"	Lauren Evans; Alex James; Frederik Nordsø Schjoldan		Now Is the Hour	2010	
"Echoes Love" •	Nermin Harambasic; Anne Judith Wik; Robin Jenssen; Ronny Svendsen		Now Is the Hour	2010	
"Eyes of a Woman"	Steve Lee; Matteo Saggese; Gary Bromham		Now Is the Hour	2010	
"Everything"	Desmond Child; Carole Rowley; Matt Noblen		Jennifer Rush (1992)	1992	
"Falling in Love"	Ernie Gold		Passion	1988	
"Fire" (Jimi Hendrix cover)	Jimi Hendrix		Heidi	1979	
"Flames of Paradise" • (Duet with Elton John)	Bruce Roberts; Andy Goldmark		Heart over Mind	1987	
"For All That"	Jennifer Rush; Irmgard Klarmann; Felix Weber	Irmgard Klarmann; Felix Weber	Wings of Desire	1989	
"For Your Eyes Only" (Sheena Easton cover)	Bill Conti; Mick Leeson		Stronghold - The Collector's Hit Box	2007 (Note: Recorded in the early 1980s, unreleased until 2007.)	
"Fortress"	Jennifer Rush; David Austin		Out of My Hands	1995	
"Frere Jacques"	Traditional		Barney's Great Adventure (Soundtrack)	1998	
"Goin Through the Motions" (Tim Henson cover)	Tom Bahler		Heidi	1979	
"Goldfinger" (Shirley Bassey cover)	John Barry; Leslie Bricusse; Anthony Newley		Stronghold - The Collector's Hit Box	2007 (Note: Recorded in the early 1980s, unreleased until 2007.)	
"Give Out"	Heidi Stern	Candy de Rouge; Gunther Mende	Non-LP track (Note: Later included on the 2007 compilation Stronghold - The Collector's Hit Box) (B-side of "Into My Dreams")	1983	
"Great Balls of Fire" (Jerry Lee Lewis cover)	Otis Blackwell; Jack Hammer		Heidi	1979	
"Head Above Water"	Gustav Efraimsson; Alice Gernandt		Now Is the Hour	2010	
"Healing Power"	Charles Judge; Dan Hill		Credo	1997	
"Heart over Mind" •	Taylor Rhodes; Tom Deluca		Heart over Mind; Classics	1987; 1998	
"Heart Wars"	Desmond Child; Rick Nowels		Heart over Mind	1987	
"Hero of a Fool"	Jennifer Rush; Mary Susan Applegate; Candy de Rouge; Gunther Mende	Candy de Rouge; Gunther Mende	Movin'; Classics	1985; 1998	
"Higher Ground" •	Ken Cummings; Mark Blatt		Wings of Desire	1989	
"I Can't Say No"	Oliver Kels; Peter Columbus; Jennifer Rush (Additional Lyrics)	Oliver Kels; Peter Columbus	Jennifer Rush (1992)	1992	
"I Come Undone" • (Ellen Shipley cover)	Ellen Shipley; Morrie Brown		Heart over Mind; Classics	1987; 1998	
"I Never Asked for an Angel"	Nicky Chinn; Jörgen Elofsson; Pär Westerlund		Now Is the Hour	2010	
"I See a Shadow (Not a Fantasy)"	Jennifer Rush	Candy de Rouge; Gunther Mende	Jennifer Rush (1984)	1984	
"If You're Ever Gonna Lose My Love" •	Jennifer Rush; Candy de Rouge; Gunther Mende	Candy de Rouge; Gunther Mende	Movin'	1985	
"I'm in It for Love"	Andy Goldmark; Patrick Henderson		Jennifer Rush (1992)	1992	
"I'm Just That Way"	D. Hastings		Heidi	1979	
"I'm Not Dreaming Anymore"	Jörgen Elofsson; Liz Rodrigues; Pär Westerlund		Now Is the Hour	2010	
"In the Arms of Love"	Desmond Child; Diane Warren; Michael Bolton		Out of My Hands	1995	
"Into My Dreams" •	Heidi Stern; Candy de Rouge; Gunther Mende	Candy de Rouge; Gunther Mende	Jennifer Rush (1984)	1983	
"Just This Way"	Lauren Evans; Fridolin Tai; Frederik Nordsø Schjoldan		Now Is the Hour	2010	
"Keep All the Fires Burning Bright" •	Jennifer Rush; Harold Faltermeyer; Keith Forsey		Passion	1988	
"Keep Outa My Way"	Jim Wolfe		Heidi	1979	
"Liars Game"	Jim Wolfe		Heidi	1979	
"Like I Would for You"	John Dexter; Ron Irving; Lynda McKillip		Now Is the Hour	2010	
"Listen (To What I Say)"	A.J. Britnell; A. Treffers		Non-LP track (Note: Later included on the 2007 compilation Stronghold - The Collector's Hit Box) (B-side of "Tonight")	1982	
"Live Wire"	Jennifer Rush; Tony Carey	Tony Carey	Movin'	1985	
"Lonely Island" (Sam Cooke cover)	Eden Ahbez		Heidi	1979	
"Love Get Ready" •	Michael Bolton; Bob Halligan Jr.		Passion	1988	
"Love is a Wild Thing"	Pamela Phillips Oland; Alides Hidding		Wings of Desire	1989	
"Love is the Language (of the Heart)"	Jennifer Rush; David Palmer	David Palmer	Wings of Desire	1989	
"Love of a Stranger"	Jennifer Rush; Tom Whitlock	Harold Faltermeyer	Heart over Mind	1987	
"Madonna's Eyes" •	Mary Susan Applegate	Candy de Rouge; Gunther Mende	Jennifer Rush (1984)	1984	
"Midnight Mirage"	Bob Halligan; Alfie Zappacosta; Graham Shaw		Wings of Desire	1989	
"More Than Words"	Jennifer Rush; Barry Eastmond		Credo	1997	
"My Heart is Still Young"	Jennifer Rush; Michael Roth; Geoffrey Iwamoto		Passion	1988	
"Never Gonna Turn Back Again"	Jennifer Rush	Candy de Rouge; Gunther Mende	Jennifer Rush (1984)	1984	
"Never Say Never" •	Rick Barron; Don Cromwell		Jennifer Rush (1992)	1992	
"Nights in White Satin" (The Moody Blues cover)	Justin Hayward		Out of My Hands	1995	
"No Me Canso De Pensar En Ti" † (If You're Ever Gonna Lose My Love)	Luis Gómez-Escolar (Spanish Lyrics); Jennifer Rush; Candy de Rouge; Gunther Mende	Candy de Rouge; Gunther Mende	Movin' (Spanish Edition)	1985	
"Nobody Move"	Patrick Henderson; Richard Feldmann; Marcy Levy		Jennifer Rush (1984)	1984	
"Now is the Hour"	Carl Falk; Sharon Vaughn; Christina Undhjem		Now Is the Hour	2010	
"Now That I Found You"	Jennifer Rush; Barry Eastmond		Credo	1997	
"Now That It's Over"	Michael Bolton; Doug James		Passion	1988	
"Nunca Digas Nunca" † (Never Say Never)	Jennifer Rush (Spanish Lyrics); Jose Julien (Spanish Lyrics); Rick Barron; Don Cromwell	Rick Barron; Don Cromwell	Jennifer Rush (1992) (Spanish Edition)	1993	
"Only Heaven Knows"	Jennifer Rush; Bernd Adamkewitz		Out of My Hands	1995	
"Open Them Gates"	Alan Sanders		Heidi	1979	
"Out of My Hands" •	Diane Warren; Jon Secada; Miguel A. Morejon		Out of My Hands	1995	
"Piano in the Dark" • (Brenda Russell cover)	Brenda Russell; Jeff Hull; Scott Cutler		Credo	1997	
"Pleasure"	Jackie Rawe; Peter Adams		Wings of Desire	1989	
"Quits" (Danny O'Keefe cover)	Danny O'Keefe		Heidi	1979	
"Rain Coming Down on Me"	Jennifer Rush; Bob Marlette; Nancy Shanks		Passion	1988	
"Remind My Heart"	Diane Warren		Passion	1988	
"Ring of Ice" •	Jennifer Rush; Candy de Rouge; Gunther Mende	Candy de Rouge; Gunther Mende	Jennifer Rush (1984); Classics	1984; 1998	
"Room No. 8" (Duet with Leslie Mándoki)	Leslie Mándoki; Laszlo Bencker		So Far... Collected Songs (Note: Later included on the 2010 compilation The Very Best of (The EMI/Virgin Years)) (Man Doki album)	1998	
"Same Heart" (Duet with Michael Bolton)	Michael Bolton; Bob Halligan Jr.		Passion	1988	
"Search the Sky"	Jennifer Rush; Tom Whitlock	Harold Faltermeyer	Heart over Mind	1987	
"Sense & Sensibility"	Morten Carlsen	Thorsten Runge	Non-LP track (Note: Used for Mercedes-Benz commercial.)	1998	
"Shocked"	Arnie Roman; Russ DeSalvo		Out of My Hands	1995	
"Si Tu Eres Mi Hombre Y Yo Tu Mujer" † (The Power of Love)	Luis Gómez-Escolar (Spanish Lyrics); Jennifer Rush; Mary Susan Applegate	Candy de Rouge; Gunther Mende	Jennifer Rush (1984) (Spanish 1986 Reissue); Classics (Spanish Edition)	1986; 1998	
"Sidekick"	Bruce Roberts; Andy Goldmark		Heart over Mind	1987	
"Silent Killer"	Jennifer Rush; Candy de Rouge; Gunther Mende	Candy de Rouge; Gunther Mende	Movin'	1985	
"Solitaria Mujer" † (Keep All the Fires Burning Bright)	Luis Gómez-Escolar (Spanish Lyrics); Jennifer Rush; Harold Faltermeyer; Keith Forsey		Passion (Spanish Edition)	1988	
"Still"	Mark Frisch; Anthony Galatis		Now Is the Hour	2010	
"Stronghold"	Bruce Roberts; Andy Goldmark		Heart over Mind	1987	
"Surrender"	Jennifer Rush	Erich Klapperton	Jennifer Rush (1984)	1984	
"Sweet Thing" • (Horse McDonald cover)	Angela McAlinden; Horse McDonald		Credo	1997	
"Tears in the Rain" • (Robin Beck cover)	Desmond Child; Diane Warren		Out of My Hands	1995	
"Testify with My Heart"	Jennifer Rush	Candy de Rouge; Gunther Mende	Movin'	1985	
"The End of a Journey" •	Jennifer Rush; Laszlo Mándoki; Laszlo Bencker		Classics	1998	
"The Flame" (Cheap Trick cover)	Bob Mitchell; Nick Graham		Credo	1997	
"The Last Day of Summer"	Jennifer Rush; Laszlo Mándoki; Laszlo Bencker		Classics	1998	
"The Man with the Golden Gun" (Lulu cover)	John Barry; Don Black		Stronghold - The Collector's Hit Box	2007 (Note: Recorded in the early 1980s, unreleased until 2007.)	
"The Places You Find Love" (Quincy Jones cover)	Clif Magness; Glen Ballard		Credo	1997	
"The Power of Love" •	Jennifer Rush; Mary Susan Applegate	Candy de Rouge; Gunther Mende	Jennifer Rush (1984); Classics	1984; 1998	
"The Right Has Come Now"	Jennifer Rush	Candy de Rouge; Gunther Mende	Movin'	1985	
"Thunderball" (Tom Jones cover)	John Barry; Don Black		Stronghold - The Collector's Hit Box	2007 (Note: Recorded in the early 1980s, unreleased until 2007.)	
"Till I Loved You" • (Duet with Plácido Domingo)	Maury Yeston		Non-LP track (Note: Later included on The Power of Jennifer Rush and Stronghold - The Collector's Hit Box)	1989	
"Timeless Love" (Saraya cover)	Desmond Child		Jennifer Rush (1992)	1992	
"Tonight" • (Ryder cover)	A.J. Britnell; A. Treffers		Non-LP track (Note: Later included on the 2007 compilation Stronghold - The Collector's Hit Box)	1982	
"Untouchable"	Robert White Johnson; Taylor Rhodes		Out of My Hands	1995	
"Unwanted Child"	Rick Nowels; Ellen Shipley		Jennifer Rush (1992)	1992	
"Vida De Mi Vida" † (You're My One and Only)	Luis Gómez-Escolar (Spanish Lyrics); Marti Sharron; Chuck Wild		Passion (Spanish Edition)	1988	
"Vision de Ti" † (Vision of You)	Jennifer Rush (Spanish Lyrics); Jose Julien (Spanish Lyrics); Rick Nowels; Ellen Shipley	Rick Nowels; Ellen Shipley	Jennifer Rush (1992) (Spanish Edition)	1993	
"Vision of You" • (Belinda Carlisle cover)	Rick Nowels; Ellen Shipley		Jennifer Rush (1992)	1992	
"Waiting for the Heartache"	Desmond Child; Jimmy Barnes		Jennifer Rush (1992)	1992	
"Walk Away"	Ellen Schwartz; Susan Pomerantz; Rodger Bruno; Lynn Feiner		Wings of Desire	1989	
"We Are the Strong" •	Harold Faltermeyer; Chris Thompson		Willy Bogner's Fire, Ice & Dynamite (Note: Later included on the 2007 compilation Stronghold - The Collector's Hit Box) (Soundtrack)	1990	
"When I Look in Your Eyes"	Jack Conrad; Larry Henley		Passion	1988	
"Where Can You Run"	Michael Bolton		Wings of Desire (CD Edition)	1989	
"Where There's a Will" (Tom Austin cover)	Tom Austin		Heidi	1979	
"Wherever You Are"	David Scott Bartky; Bob Martinez		Jennifer Rush (1992)	1992	
"Who I Am"	Michael O'Hara; Denise Rich; Alan Rich		Jennifer Rush (1992)	1992	
"Who Wants to Live Forever" (Duet with Brian May) (Note: A solo version was also recorded but unreleased until 2010 on the compilation The Very Best of (The EMI/Virgin Years)) (Queen cover)	Brian May		Out of My Hands	1995	
"Windows"	Jörgen Elofsson; Liz Rodrigues; Rikard Brandén		Now Is the Hour	2010	
"Wings of Desire" •	Amy Sky; Bruce Gaitsch		Wings of Desire	1989	
"Witch Queen of New Orleans" (Redbone cover)	Lolly Vegas	Pat Vegas	Non-LP track (Note: Later included on the 2007 compilation Stronghold - The Collector's Hit Box) (B-side of "Come Give Me Your Hand")	1983	
"Yes We Can" • (as part of Artists United For Nature)	Chris Thompson; Harold Faltermeyer		Non-LP track	1989	
"Yester-Me, Yester-You, Yesterday" (Stevie Wonder cover)	Ron Miller; Bryan Wells		Movin'	1985	
"Yo Que Te Tengo A Ti" † (Now That I Found You)	Jennifer Rush; Barry Eastmond		Credo (Spanish Edition)	1997	
"You and I"	Jennifer Rush; Laszlo Bencker; Leslie Mandoki		Stars Inspired By Disney's Atlantis: Das Geheimnis Der Verlorenen Stadt	2001	
"You Brought the Sunshine to My Life"	Dee Daniels; Jim Wolfe		Heidi	1979	
"You Don't Know What You've Got (Until It's Gone)"	Marti Sharron; Chuck Wild		Passion	1988	
"You'll Never Catch Me Dreaming"	Peter Zizzo; Russ DeSalvo		Classics	1998	
"You're My One and Only" •	Marti Sharron; Chuck Wild		Passion	1988	
"You've Been on My Mind"	Dave Raynor		Heidi	1979	
