= Terry Dobson (singer) =

British musician (born 1952)

- Born: Terry Dobson; 29 March 1952 (age 74); Wakefield, England
- Genre: Europop
- Occupations: Drummer, author, businessman, manager
- Instruments: Vocals, drums
- Years active: 1969–present
- Formerly of: Black Lace
- Website: andthencameagadoo.co.uk

Terry Dobson (born 29 March 1952) is a British musician and a founding member of the pop band, Black Lace, with Ian Howarth.

They represented the United Kingdom in the Eurovision Song Contest 1979 in Jerusalem, with the song "Mary Ann", which finished seventh.

== Early life ==
Terry Dobson was born on 29 March 1952 on a large council estate in Wakefield. He attended Flanshaw Infants (now called Flanshaw Junior and Infants), Alverthorpe Junior, Ings Road Secondary Modern School, and Building College until, at the age of 21, he entered higher education at Huddersfield Polytechnic, now the University of Huddersfield.

From 15 years of age, Dobson worked as a joiner for Horners Building Contractors in Ossett and for Wakefield Metropolitan District Council before turning professional with Black Lace in 1976.

Dobson formed the pop group The Impact in 1969 with his school friend Ian Howarth. This was after playing drums on the chair arms of another friend Freddy Pearson's mother's best three piece suite. Following this, a drum kit of sorts was put together after Billy Blackburn donated a bass drum and tom toms to the cause. It was four years and two further band name changes (Penny Arcade and Love or Confusion) before Black Lace was born.

== Black Lace ==
Dobson and Howarth, founded Black Lace in 1974 together, after four years with the other band members Steve Scholey, Nigel Scott and Alan Barton. Dobson left the group in 1973, a short time after Howarth, but both later rejoined after a couple of line up changes involving Neil Hardcastle (drums for three months) and Nigel Scott (bass guitar for four years).

They finally arrived at the line up in 1976 consisting of Steve Scholey (lead singer), Alan Barton (lead guitar, lead singer and backing vocals), Dobson (drums and backing vocals) and Colin Routh (Gibb) (bass guitar, backing vocals and stringed instruments).

Following the band's split in January 1981, Dobson joined the Castleford-based band Stormer, formerly known as Method. The band had toured the length and breadth of the UK before being signed up by Ringo Starr, after a recording deal with Jonathan King had ended. Dobson's time with the band ended on 31 December 1984 when the band decided to call it a day.

Dobson's professional drumming career now in tatters, he returned to working for Wakefield Metropolitan District Council as a maintenance joiner, almost eight years to the day when he had left.

After some eight months without a drumming job, Dobson was asked to step in with some friends in a band called Aircrew when their drummer was taken ill. When the illness worsened, Dobson became the permanent drummer, though the band only played in a semi-professional capacity. He left Aircrew in 1993 after a love affair forced the break up of his second marriage. The band split up in 1995.

== Mister Twister ==
Dobson still plays drums in the Wakefield band Mister Twister comprising Jim Trueman (guitar and lead vocals), Dave Pickles (guitar and lead vocals), John Deyes (keyboards and backing vocalist) and Dobson (drums, various percussion and backing vocals). Two of the band members are former musician friends from the Aircrew.

== Tricia's death ==
Dobson spent nine years writing of the ups and downs of life with Black Lace. He pledged to donate a portion of the profits from sales of the book to Wakefield Hospice, a care home for terminally ill patients.

The book's writing was suddenly halted, with the death of his partner, Tricia, to an asthma attack in 2006, leaving him to look after his youngest son Liam.

The book was completed in 2009 and went on sale in November that year. Dobson said in the Wakefield Express, "I'm delighted to have got it finished, but I could not have done it without family and friends and the support of partner Chris. They have all been so supportive in helping me raise Liam, no more so than Trica's mum Marlene and step dad Roger which gave me the extra time needed to write and finish the book."
