= The Power of Jennifer Rush =

Compilation album by Jennifer Rush
- Released: October 22, 1991
- Label: Columbia

Jennifer Rush chronology
| Wings of Desire (1989) | The Power of Jennifer Rush (1991) | Jennifer Rush (1992) |

Singles from The Power of Jennifer Rush
- 1. "Ave Maria (Survivors of a Different Kind)" Released: 1991

The Power of Jennifer Rush is a compilation album released by American singer Jennifer Rush.

This was the first official collection released by Rush. As well as featuring her past hits, a new single was released from the collection, "Ave Maria" (originally from her earlier album Movin').

Released in late 1991, the album only reached No.40 in Germany, but sustained a lengthy run on the charts and re-entered in 1995. The collection also peaked within the top 40 in Switzerland and Austria.

A repackaged version of the album, entitled The Platinum Edition was released in 2001 to mark its 10th anniversary.

== Track listing ==
The Power of Jennifer Rush track listing – Columbia 469163 1
| No. | Title | Writer(s) | Original album | Length |
|---|---|---|---|---|
| 1. | "Destiny" | Jennifer Rush; Candy DeRouge; Gunther Mende | Movin | 3:35 |
| 2. | "Heart over Mind" | Taylor Rhodes; Tom Deluca | Heart over Mind | 4:10 |
| 3. | "Ave Maria (Survivors of a Different Kind)" | Rush; DeRouge; Mende | Movin | 3:48 |
| 4. | "Ring of Ice" | Rush; DeRouge; Mende | Jennifer Rush | 3:50 |
| 5. | "The Power of Love" | Rush; Mary Susan Applegate; DeRouge; Mende | Jennifer Rush | 6:00 |
| 6. | "Higher Ground" | Ken Cummings; Mark Blatt | Wings of Desire | 4:20 |
| 7. | "Flames of Paradise" (Duet with Elton John) (Single Edit) | Bruce Roberts; Andy Goldmark | Heart over Mind | 4:00 |
| 8. | "25 Lovers" | Rush; DeRouge; Mende | Jennifer Rush | 3:37 |
| 9. | "I Come Undone" | Ellen Shipley; Morrie Brown | Heart over Mind | 4:06 |
| 10. | "Same Heart" (Duet with Michael Bolton) | Michael Bolton; Bob Halligan Jr. | Passion | 4:17 |
| 11. | "If You're Ever Gonna Lose My Love" | Rush; deRouge; Mende | Movin | 3:50 |

The Power of Jennifer Rush CD bonus tracks – Columbia 469163 2
| No. | Title | Writer(s) | Original album | Length |
|---|---|---|---|---|
| 12. | "Solitaria Mujer" (Keep All the Fires Burning Bright) | Luis Gómez-Escolar; Rush; Harold Faltermeyer; Keith Forsey | Passion | 4:53 |
| 13. | "Vida de Mi Vida" (You're My One and Only) | Gómez-Escolar; Marti Sharron; Chuck Wild | Passion | 4:30 |

The Power of Jennifer Rush Spanish LP edition – CBS/Sony 471125 1
| No. | Title | Writer(s) | Original album | Length |
|---|---|---|---|---|
| 11. | "No Me Canso De Pensar En Ti" (If You're Ever Gonna Lose My Love) | Gómez-Escolar; Rush; deRouge; Mende | Movin | 3:50 |
| 12. | "Si Tu Eres Mi Hombre Y Yo Tu Mujer" (The Power of Love) | Gómez-Escolar; Rush; Applegate; deRouge; Mende | Jennifer Rush | 5:15 |

The Power of Jennifer Rush Spanish CD edition – CBS/Sony 471125 2
| No. | Title | Writer(s) | Original album | Length |
|---|---|---|---|---|
| 11. | "No Me Canso De Pensar En Ti" (If You're Ever Gonna Lose My Love) | Gómez-Escolar; Rush; deRouge; Mende | Movin | 3:50 |
| 12. | "Solitaria Mujer" (Keep All the Fires Burning Bright) | Gómez-Escolar; Rush; Harold Faltermeyer; Keith Forsey | Passion | 4:53 |
| 13. | "Vida de Mi Vida" (You're My One and Only) | Gómez-Escolar; Marti Sharron; Chuck Wild | Passion | 4:30 |
| 14. | "Si Tu Eres Mi Hombre Y Yo Tu Mujer" (The Power of Love) | Gómez-Escolar; Rush; Applegate; deRouge; Mende | Jennifer Rush | 5:15 |

== Charts ==
Chart performance for The Power of Jennifer Rush
| Chart (1991) | Peak position |
|---|---|
| Austrian Albums (Ö3 Austria) | 37 |
| European Top 100 Albums (Music & Media) | 90 |
| German Albums (Offizielle Top 100) | 40 |
| Swiss Albums (Schweizer Hitparade) | 34 |

== Certifications ==
| Region | Certification | Certified units/sales |
|---|---|---|
| Germany (BVMI) | Gold | 250,000^{^} |
^{^} Shipments figures based on certification alone.
