= Agadoo =

- "Agadoo"/"Fiddling" Single

Single by Black Lace

from the album Party Party
- Released: 1984
- Recorded: 1984
- Genre: Bubblegum pop; calypso; novelty; comedy; Europop
- Length: 3:06
- Songwriters: Mya Symille; Michael Delancray; Gilles Péram; Günther Behrle

Black Lace singles chronology
"Hey You" (1983)	"Agadoo" (1984)	"Do the Conga" (1984)

Audio sample
- file; help

"Agadoo" is a novelty song recorded by the British band Black Lace in 1984. "Agadoo" peaked at number two on the UK Singles Chart, and spent 30 weeks in the top 75. It went on to become the eighth-best-selling single of 1984 in the UK, (and over one million copies worldwide) despite not being included on the playlist for BBC Radio 1 because it "was not credible".

In a survey for Dotmusic in 2000, respondents voted "Agadoo" as the fourth most annoying song of all time. A 2003 poll for Q magazine saw a panel of music writers vote "Agadoo" as the worst song of all time, saying: "It sounded like the school disco you were forced to attend, your middle-aged relatives forming a conga at a wedding party, a travelling DJ act based in Wolverhampton, every party cliche you ever heard." The panel also described it as "magnificently dreadful".

== Origins and recording ==
The song's origins date back to 1970, when Michel Delancray and Mya Symille recorded it as "Agadou" in French. It had been written based on a tune that had apparently come from Morocco. Club Med used it as their theme song from 1974. It was covered by several artists and groups, including Patrick Zabe in 1975, South African singer Glenys Lynne in 1979, and the Saragossa Band (a German group) in 1981 (and a remix in 1986). Black Lace uses the lyrics first used in The Snowmen's 1981 cover of "Agadou", which was also the first cover to spell the song's title as "Agadoo". These lyrics are based on the lyrics of the Saragossa Band version but with minor tweaks.

The Black Lace group was made up during its heyday by the duo of performers Colin Gibb and Alan Barton. One of the early versions of the song, likely the cover by The Snowmen, became popular in a Derby nightclub called Gossips, with the bar staff making a novelty dance; when Black Lace performed at the club in 1981, they learned the dance and recorded their own version, which was mistakenly reported as being the first version in English by BBC Radio Derby in 2006.

Black Lace's version of the song was produced by Neil Ferguson and Black Lace at Woodlands Studio under the direction of John Wagstaff and arranged by Barry Whitfield and Black Lace. Whitfield also played keyboards on the track.

== Formats and track listings ==
UK 1984 7" single

1. "Agadoo" – 3:07
2. "Fiddling" – 2:14

UK 1984 12" single

1. "Agadoo" (12” Extended Mix) – 4:49
2. "Superman" (X Rated Version) – 3:44
3. "Fiddling" – 2:14

UK 1998 CD single

1. "Agadoo 106 Mix"
2. "Electric Slide"

== Charts ==
=== Chart performance ===
Despite not being played on BBC Radio 1 because it "was not credible", the track proved to be a commercial hit. On the UK singles chart, "Agadoo" debuted at number 86 on 20 May 1984. The song did not enter the top 40 until the end of July, then peaking at number 38. In its fourth week in the top 40, "Agadoo" reached number 2, with George Michael's "Careless Whisper" holding it off the top spot. By early November, the song was still in the top 40, but it fell out after the first week in that month. By 13 January 1985, its last appearance in the chart, "Agadoo" had spent 35 weeks in the top 100. It was revealed to be the eighth-best-selling single of 1984 around that time. Fourteen years after its original release, the song was re-recorded and re-released. It re-entered the top 100 at number 64 on 16 August 1998 but only stayed in the chart for two weeks.

The song found success in other countries as well, such as Ireland, New Zealand and France. On the Irish Singles Chart, the song peaked at number 5, but only spent five weeks on the chart overall. "Agadoo" spent a longer eleven weeks on the New Zealand Singles Chart, debuting at number 37 on 21 October 1984 and hitting a peak of number 9 in its sixth week. The song fell out of the chart quite abruptly, falling 25 places to number 44 in its final appearance in the chart before falling out completely. On the French Singles Chart, the song peaked at number 48 in its first and only week on 17 November 1984.

=== Weekly charts ===
Chart (1984–1985)	Peak position
Australia (Kent Music Report)	16
France (SNEP)	48
Ireland (IRMA)	5
New Zealand (Recorded Music NZ)	9
South Africa	3
UK (CIN)	2

=== Year-end charts ===
Chart (1984)	Position
Australia (Kent Music Report)	88
UK singles chart	8

== Certifications ==
Region	Certification	Certified units/sales
United Kingdom (BPI)	Gold	500,000^{^}
^{^} Shipments figures based on certification alone.

== Covers ==
The song has been frequently covered in its original French, as well as in English and many other languages. A cover by the German pop band Saragossa Band was released in 1981. This was the first cover of the song to be recorded in English. The single also appeared in their debut album Za Za Zabadak. It reached number 14 on the German Singles Chart and number 5 on the Austrian Singles Chart.

A version in Spanish titled "Agadu" was recorded by Georgie Dann sometime during the 1970s. It most recently appeared on Dann's 2016 album Casatschok.

In 1981, the song was covered in Finnish by singer Armi; it received another Finnish cover by Helena Rossi that same year.

The group Koukeri covered the song in their native Bulgarian in 1982.

Dutch carnival singer Arie Ribbens recorded a version in Dutch in 1983, called "Akketdoe". The song was re-recorded in Dutch, specifically the Flemish dialect, with different lyrics in 2014 by Salim Seghers, as "Agadou dou dou". Also in 1983, František Ringo Čech covered the song in Czech as "Já už jdu".

Curt Haagers covered the song in their native Swedish in 1984, using lyrics from a 1982 cover by Trivs mé Brogens.

In 1984, Brazilian TV show host Gugu Liberato recorded a version called "Bugalu". The lyrics were changed to reference the eponymous character, Bugalu, a mascot from Viva a Noite, his Saturday-night show.

Brazilian group Musical Columbia covered the song in Portuguese in 1985; the band Sétimo Sentido covered the song again in 2012 with the same lyrics.

In 1998, Icelandic singer Sigga recorded the song in Icelandic under the title "Agadú" for her album Flikk-flakk. A second cover, using the same lyrics as Sigga's, by Icelandic artist Laddi, was recorded in 2010, using an instrumental directly based on Black Lace's.

In 2000, Estonian singer Üllar Jörberg covered the song in Estonian under the title "Mereranna tuul". Kroonika listed it as one of his most popular songs.

Thai pop duo Mr. Sister recorded a Thai version under the title "Amadoo" (อาม่าดุ) in 2002.

Zouzounia, a children's band, recorded a version in Greek sung by children in 2006.

== Parodies and derivative versions ==
Black Lace themselves recorded an X-rated version of the song entitled "Have a Screw", which was written by Black Lace members Alan Barton and Colin Gibb and released on the B-side of the 12-inch vinyl "Gang Bang". The track was re-recorded some years later by Colin Gibb and Dean Michael, which was featured on the Blue Album.

The Australian satirical TV series CNNNN ran a fake cross-promotion for Agadoo: The Musical.

The British TV series Auf Wiedersehen Pet features the Black Lace version when the character Oz uses a jukebox and selects a random track; appalled at the song once it plays, he kicks the machine to make it stop and derisively comments "Aga-bloody-doo!?"

In 1986, the song was parodied in "The Chicken Song" by the satirical television programme Spitting Image. The track's composer Philip Pope had previously parodied the song as "Shagadoo" in Radio Active.

In 1994, the song was featured on the Chilean game show Cachureos with new lyrics in Spanish as "Haga Pipi," which describe remembering to go to the bathroom before going to bed to avoid bed-wetting accidents.

The song was also used as the basis of a chant by fans of Liverpool for defender Daniel Agger, and Newcastle United fans for Spanish striker Joselu. It is similarly used by fans of Tottenham Hotspur for midfielder Christian Eriksen. Since 2023, it has been used by Leeds United fans for their captain, Ethan Ampadu.

The band Chumbawamba recorded a version of "Agadoo" for the Peel Sessions. The producer of the Black Lace version, Neil Ferguson, was also Chumbawamba's regular producer at the time and later a full member of the band. The band was asked by their record company to add "Agadoo" on a single, the actual track used, was performed by Black Lace.

German group Die Lollipops recorded a version called "So Wie Du" with unrelated lyrics on their 2005 album Wir Wolln Spass.

It was parodied in a Vanilla Mini Wheats commercial in 2006 and by The Maynards in 2013, who recorded a bluegrass version of the song.

In November 2009, Black Lace recorded a version called "Agadir" to promote a new air service by easyJet from Gatwick airport to Agadir.

On 20 March 2009, it was announced that the song was being released in a new version by Dene Michael, who joined the band in 1987, along with Ian Robinson. A video for the release, titled "Agadoo" (Mambo 2009 remix), was directed by Bruce Jones, who played Les Battersby in television soap opera Coronation Street. He also appears in the video, along with Kevin Kennedy, who played Curly Watts in the same programme.

A cover of "Agadoo" with lyrics about the New Year was featured on the December 31, 2016, special of the Russian adaptation of The Voice Kids.

Ulrika Jonsson was introduced in the comedy panel show, Shooting Stars in a parody version of the song.

On 8 October 2026, during the 6th episode of the 8th season of Drag Race UK, the queens were required to write, record, and perform verses to a remake of the song.

== See also ==
- List of music considered the worst
