= Barry Whitfield =

British Musician

Barry Whitfield (born 10 April 1954) is an English pianist, organist, jazz musician, musical director and teacher.

== Early life ==
Barry Whitfield was born in the town of Grimsby and brought up in Cleethorpes in North East Lincolnshire. He was the only son of Bransby Whitfield (businessman) and Joan Whitfield, a ballet teacher, choreographer and member of the British Ballet Organisation. He attended Clee Grammar School (Matthew Humberstone Foundation School), where he gained 10 O-levels and 3 A-levels, including one in music. Initially intending to study medicine but not attaining physics, he went on to the University College of North Wales (now Bangor University) to read biochemistry. He began studying the piano at the age of five and had achieved grade eight Pianoforte, Theory of Music and Pipe Organ by the age of 13. During his teenage years, he studied piano with Harry Isaacs (Royal Academy of Music), and organ with Horace Bate (Organist at St James' Church, Muswell Hill and conductor of The Madrigal Society of London), and continued to have lessons through his years at university.

== Musical career ==
After graduating, Whitfield began working as a pianist in the Sands nightclub in Cleethorpes, accompanying a variety of cabaret artists and directing a four-piece band. During this time he had the opportunity of auditioning for Sir Norman Wisdom whilst he was appearing at Skegness Pier. He accepted the position of pianist and assistant musical director and toured with Wisdom for nearly three years, in Australia, New Zealand and Rhodesia. Their tours comprised dates in the British Isles as well, including a season on the Isle of Man, where Wisdom later settled in 1980. He also made some television appearances with Wisdom, including on Saturday Night at the Mill and at the London Palladium. After leaving Wisdom's employ, Whitfield settled back in Cleethorpes and worked as a session keyboard player and arranger. He recorded for Flair Records with Black Lace, during which time he gained gold records for his work on the "magnificently dreadful" "Agadoo" and "Party Party 1" (released on Telstar Records). His band spent numerous summer seasons playing in Skegness.
