= Heart over Mind =

Heart over Mind may refer to:

- Heart over Mind (Anne Murray album), 1984
- Heart over Mind (Jennifer Rush album), 1987
- Heart over Mind (Tammy Wynette album), 1990
- "Heart Over Mind" (Alan Walker song), 2023
- "Heart over Mind" (Kim Wilde song), 1992
- "Heart over Mind", a song by Jennifer Rush from the album of the same name.
- "Heart over Mind", a song by Lorrie Morgan from the album War Paint
