= Wings of Desire (album) =

Studio album by Jennifer Rush
- Released: November 6, 1989
- Genres: Pop rock; adult contemporary
- Length: 40:47; 44:07 (CD)
- Label: CBS
- Producers: Christopher Neil; Phil Ramone; Michael J. Powell

Jennifer Rush chronology
Passion (1988)	Wings of Desire (1989)	The Power of Jennifer Rush (1991)

Singles from Wings of Desire
- 1. "Higher Ground" Released: 1989; 2. "Wings of Desire" Released: 1990

Wings of Desire is the fifth studio album by American singer Jennifer Rush, released in November 1989.

== Background ==
After working mainly with American writers and producers for her last two albums, Rush decided to bring her music back to Europe and collaborated with producers Christopher Neil, Phil Ramone and others, including a song, "Angel", which was co-written by ABBA affiliate Tomas Ledin. Rush loved the music of "Angel", but did not like the lyrics and chose to re-write them.

== Commercial performance ==
Wings of Desire failed to sell as well as Rush's earlier albums, although it did make the top 20 in Germany, Sweden and Switzerland. In her biggest market, Germany, the album remained in the chart for 20 weeks. In the UK the album was released in April 1990 with the lead single "Higher Ground". It failed to chart highly in the UK despite her scoring a hit with "Till I Loved You" the previous year.

The title track "Wings of Desire" was released as a second single in 1990.

== Track listing ==
Writers in the 'Music' column are the same as those in the 'Lyrics' column unless otherwise stated.

Wings of Desire track listing
No.	Title	Lyrics	Music	Producer	Length
1.	"Wings of Desire"	Amy Sky; Bruce Gaitsch		Christopher Neil	4:03
2.	"Pleasure"	Jackie Rawe; Peter Adams		Neil	4:10
3.	"Midnight Mirage"	Bob Halligan; Alfie Zappacosta; Graham Shaw		Phil Ramone	4:15
4.	"Angel"	Jennifer Rush; Ramone	Tomas Ledin	Ramone	4:39
5.	"Higher Ground"	Ken Cummings; Mark Blatt		Ramone	4:20
6.	"Love is a Wild Thing"	Pamela Phillips Oland; Alides Hidding		Ramone; Michael J. Powell	4:47
7.	"For All That"	Rush; Irmgard Klarmann; Felix Weber	Klarmann; Weber	Ramone	4:13
8.	"Love is the Language (of the Heart)"	Rush; David Palmer	Palmer	Ramone	4:28
9.	"Cry"	Duncain Pain		Powell	3:44
10.	"Walk Away"	Rodger Bruno; Ellen Schwartz; Lynn Feiner; Susan Pomerantz		Ramone	3:48
11.	"Where Can You Run" (CD bonus track)	Michael Bolton		Powell	3:20
Total length:					45:47

== Personnel ==
- Bass: Adrian Lee (1), Peter Adams (2), Robbie Buchanan (5)
- Drums: Adrian Lee (1), Peter Van Hooke (2), Eric Rehl (3, 6–8), David Lebolt (4), Robbie Buchanan (5), Sammy Merendino (10)
- Guitar: Adrian Lee (1), Carlos Alomar (3–4, 6–8, 10), Michael Landau (5), Michael J. Powell (9, 11), Donnie Lyle (9, 11)
- Keyboards: Adrian Lee (1), Peter Adams (2), Eric Rehl (3, 6–10), David Lebolt (4), Robbie Buchanan (5), Vernon D. Fails (9, 11)
- Saxophone: Bobby Stern (8–10)
- Percussion: Bashiri Johnson (3–4, 6–11)
- Backing vocals: Alan Clavell (1), Christopher Neil (1), Linda Taylor (2), Stevie Blue (4, 6–8, 10), Jennifer Rush (4, 7–10), Dorianne Elliot (4, 6), Karen Kamon (4, 6–8, 10), Paulette McWilliams (4, 6), Mark Hudson (5), Dawn Feusi (5), Lise Miller (5), Robin Clark (6), Mark Radice (7–8, 10), Diva Gray (7–8, 10), Valerie Pinkston-Mayo (9), Kim Edwards-Brown (9), Fred White (9), Franke Previte (10), The New Jersey Mass Choir (10)

== Charts ==
Chart performance for Wings of Desire
Chart (1989–1990)	Peak position
European Albums (Music & Media)	36
Finnish Albums (Suomen virallinen lista)	37
German Albums (Offizielle Top 100)	12
Swedish Albums (Sverigetopplistan)	18
Swiss Albums (Schweizer Hitparade)	13

== Certifications ==
Region	Certification	Certified units/sales
Germany (BVMI)	Gold	250,000^{^}
Switzerland (IFPI Switzerland)	Gold	25,000^{^}
^{^} Shipments figures based on certification alone.

== Release history ==
Region	Date	Label	Format(s)	Cat. No.	Ref.
United Kingdom	9 April 1990	CBS	LP; Cassette; CD	4660001; 4660004; 4660002	
