= Higher Ground (Jennifer Rush song) =

1989 single by Jennifer Rush

Single by Jennifer Rush

from the album Wings of Desire
- B-side: "Angel"
- Released: 1989
- Recorded: 1989
- Genre: Electronic; pop; synthpop
- Length: 4:20
- Label: CBS
- Songwriters: Ken Cummings; Mark Blatt
- Producer: Phil Ramone

Jennifer Rush singles chronology
"Till I Loved You" (1989)	"Higher Ground" (1989)	"Wings of Desire" (1990)

"Higher Ground" is a song by American singer Jennifer Rush from her 1989 album Wings of Desire. Written by Ken Cummings and Mark Blatt, and produced by Phil Ramone, it was issued as the album's lead single in December 1989. A French-language version was later recorded by Mario Pelchat and Celine Dion for Pelchat's 1993 album and released as a promotional single in Quebec.

== Background and release ==
"Higher Ground" is a panegyric in which Rush praises her partner for their support and affirms that if they ever need help, she will be "standing on higher ground" and ready to look after them.

Released as the first single from Wings of Desire, the song reached number 27 in Austria, number 54 in Germany, and number 98 in the United Kingdom. A music video was produced to promote the single and includes scenes of Rush singing and dancing.

Rush performed "Higher Ground" on Peter's Popshow. According to the liner notes of her next album, The Power of Jennifer Rush, she slipped off the stage after that performance and broke her leg. Although she honored most of her tour dates, the injury delayed the recording of The Power of Jennifer Rush, which was ultimately released as a compilation album rather than a studio album.

"Higher Ground" has since appeared on several Rush compilations, including Jennifer Rush: The Hit Box (2002), The Power of Love: The Complete Video Collection (2004), Hit Collection, and Stronghold – The Collector's Hit Box.

== Formats and track listing ==
- European 7-inch single
1. "Higher Ground" – 4:20
2. "Angel" – 4:39
- European 12-inch single
1. "Higher Ground" (extended mix) – 6:31
2. "Angel" – 4:39
3. "Higher Ground" – 4:20
- European 3-inch CD single
1. "Higher Ground" – 4:20
2. "Angel" – 4:39
3. "Higher Ground" (extended mix) – 6:31
- UK 7-inch and cassette single
1. "Higher Ground" – 4:20
2. "The Power of Love" – 4:20
- UK CD single
1. "Higher Ground" – 4:20
2. "Higher Ground" (extended mix) – 6:31
3. "The Power of Love" – 4:20

== Charts ==
Chart performance
Chart (1989–1990)	Peak position
Austria (Ö3 Austria Top 40)	27
UK Singles Chart	98
West Germany (GfK)	54

== Release history ==
Region	Date	Label	Format(s)	Cat. No.	Ref.
United Kingdom	12 March 1990	CBS	7-inch; CD; Cassette	6553440; 6553442; 6553444	

== Mario Pelchat and Celine Dion version ==
"Plus haut que moi"

Promotional single by Mario Pelchat and Celine Dion

from the album Pelchat
- Language: French
- Released: September 1993
- Recorded: 1993
- Studio: Le Lab Mastering (Montreal)
- Genre: Pop
- Length: 4:18
- Label: Columbia
- Songwriters: Eddy Marnay; Ken Cummings; Mark Blatt
- Producer: Aldo Nova

Audio
- "Plus haut que moi" on YouTube

In 1993, "Higher Ground" was recorded in French by Canadian singers Mario Pelchat and Celine Dion. Titled "Plus haut que moi" (lit. '"Higher than me"'), it includes lyrics by Eddy Marnay and production by Aldo Nova. The song was issued as a promotional single and reached number six on the radio chart in Quebec.

=== Background and release ===
Pelchat's self-titled fifth studio album was released in February 1993. It reached number three on the albums chart in Quebec and was certified double platinum in Canada. The album includes "Plus haut que moi", a duet with Dion. It was released as the third promotional single in Quebec in September 1993. In 1995, the promotional single was also issued in France. In 2005, Dion included "Plus haut que moi" on the l'intégrale edition of her greatest hits album, On ne change pas.

=== Commercial performance ===
"Plus haut que moi" entered the radio chart in Quebec on September 11, 1993. It peaked at number six and remained on the chart for 19 weeks.

=== Charts ===
Chart performance
Chart (1993)	Peak position
Quebec Radio Songs (ADISQ)	6
