= Goya: A Life in Song =

1989 Spanish album

Studio album by Plácido Domingo and others
- Released: March 1989
- Genre: Classical, operatic pop
- Length: 54:04
- Label: CBS / Sony

Singles from Goya: A Life in Song
- 1. "Till I Loved You"

Singles from Goya: Una vida hecha canción
- 1. "Hasta amarte"

Professional ratings
Review scores
Source	Rating
Allmusic	3/5 stars

Goya: A Life in Song is a musical theatre work with music and lyrics by American composer Maury Yeston, first released as a concept album in 1989 featuring Spanish tenor Plácido Domingo. Domingo released the Spanish-language version of the album Goya: Una vida hecha canción in 1992.

Prior to the album's release, the Goya love theme "Till I Loved You" became a hit single for Barbra Streisand in 1988.

== Background ==
Popular opera singer Plácido Domingo was interested in starring in a stage musical about Spanish painter Francisco de Goya and suggested to producer Alan Carr that Yeston would be the right person to create the vehicle, since Domingo had admired Yeston's work on the musical Nine. Because of Domingo's time commitments, however, the musical was made as a concept album.

== Releases and singles ==
Domingo sang the role of Goya, with supporting roles sung by Dionne Warwick, Gloria Estefan, Jennifer Rush (who sang Warwick's parts in the European release of this album), Joe Cerisano, Richie Havens and Seiko Matsuda (who sang Dionne's parts in the Japan-only release version of this album). The recording was released by CBS/Sony. Not available for 20 years, Masterworks Broadway released a digitally remastered version of the album on September 28, 2010.

The score featured the break-out song "Till I Loved You", which was recorded by Domingo with singer Jennifer Rush and became a hit in Europe. Domingo and Gloria Estefan recorded "Hasta amarte" for the Spanish-language Goya: Una vida hecha canción, which reached #8 on the Billboard chart for Hot Latin Songs. The Brazilian edition of the album included a Portuguese version of "Till I Loved You" (Apaixonou) by Domingo and Simone Bittencourt de Oliveira. It was subsequently a US Top 40 hit by Barbra Streisand and Don Johnson. The album itself reached No. 36 in the UK albums chart in June 1989.

== Track listing ==
All titles composed by Maury Yeston

1. "Overture/Espana" (performed by Paul Hoffert and Plácido Domingo) 4:22
2. "The Astounding Romantic Adventures of Goya/In the Middle of the 18th Century" (performed by Plácido Domingo) 5:34
3. "Girl With a Smile" (performed by Plácido Domingo) 2:05
4. "Till I Loved You" (performed by Plácido Domingo and Dionne Warwick USA / Seiko Matsuda Japan / Jennifer Rush UK Europe ) 4:52
5. "Picture It" ([performed by Gloria Estefan and Joseph Cerisano) 4:34
6. "I Will Paint Sounds" (performed by Plácido Domingo) 4:48
7. "Viva Espana" (performed by The Tsunami Orchestra and Chorus) 5:35
8. "Once a Time (I Loved You)" (performed by Dionne Warwick) 3:43
9. "I Stand Alone" (performed by Plácido Domingo) 3:34
10. "Dog in the Quicksand" (performed by Richie Havens) 3:41
11. "Moving On" (performed by Seiko Matsuda) 2:38
12. "Bon Soir" (performed by Plácido Domingo) 2:39
13. "Finale" (performed by Plácido Domingo) 1:42
14. "Hasta Amarte (Till I Loved You)" (performed by Plácido Domingo and Gloria Estefan) 4:50
