= Same Heart (disambiguation) =

"Same Heart" is a 2014 song by Israeli recording artist Mei Finegold.

Same Heart may also refer to:

== Games ==
- Doushin: Same Heart (同心 same heart) Japanese electronic game

== Music ==
- Ddokateun Mam (똑 같은 맘, "Same Heart")
- "Same Heart", a 1986 song by Jennifer Rush in duet with Michael Bolton, written by Michael Bolton, from Passion and Stronghold – The Collector's Hit Box
- "Same Heart", No.6 Dutch hit single by Laura Jansen
