= Jennifer Rush (1992 album) =

Studio album by Jennifer Rush
- Released: October 30, 1992
- Label: EMI
- Producers: Rick Barron; Poul Bruun; Desmond Child; Peter Columbus; Don Cromwell; Rick Nowels; Michael O'Hara; Oli Poulsen; Denise Rich

Jennifer Rush chronology
The Power of Jennifer Rush (1991)	Jennifer Rush (1992)	Out of My Hands (1995)

Singles from Jennifer Rush
- 1. "Never Say Never" Released: November 1992; 2. "Vision of You" Released: February 1993; 3. "A Broken Heart" Released: May 1993

Jennifer Rush is the sixth studio album by American singer Jennifer Rush. Released in Europe in October 1992, the album features songwriters and producers such as Rick Nowels, Ellen Shipley and Desmond Child. Singles released were "Never Say Never", "A Broken Heart" and "Vision of You," a cover of the Belinda Carlisle song.

== Commercial performance ==
Jennifer Rush performed poorly on the charts compared to Jennifer's earlier albums. In Germany the album peaked at 35 on the albums chart, her first studio album to miss the Top 20 in this country. The album stayed on the chart for 10 weeks, at the time the shortest chart run of any of her albums. In Switzerland, the album was also her first to miss the Top 20, instead peaking at 38 and staying on the chart for 3 weeks. Jennifer Rush was Jennifer's first album to fail to chart in Sweden.

In Austria, the album charted for one week at no. 40, an improvement compared to her previous album Wings of Desire which did not reach the Top 40 at all.

== Reception ==
Music & Media noted the album's songs were "perfectly shaped for her vocal abilities, making it a dream for AC programmers", and compared the song "Wherever You Are" to ballads by Whitney Houston.

== Singles ==
- "Never Say Never" was the first single released from the album in November 1992, and reached number 46 in Germany. It also reached number 20 on the Switzerland airplay chart compiled by Music & Media.
- "Vision of You" was the second single released from the album in February 1993, and reached number 56 in Germany. The Spanish version titled "Vision de Ti" was released as a promotional single in Spain in 1993.
- "A Broken Heart" was the third single released from the album in May 1993, and reached number 90 in Germany.

The album track "I Can't Say No" received radio adds in Denmark soon after the album's release. Despite this, it never became a single. The album track "Timeless Love" received radio adds in Greece in April 1993, but also did not become a single.

== Track listing ==
Jennifer Rush track listing
No.	Title	Writer(s)	Producer(s)	Length
1.	"Vision of You" (Belinda Carlisle cover)	Rick Nowels; Ellen Shipley	Nowels	4:31
2.	"I'm In It for Love"	Andy Goldmark; Patrick Henderson	Oli Poulsen; Poul Bruun	4:12
3.	"Everything"	Desmond Child; Carole Rowley; Matt Noblen	Child	4:09
4.	"Wherever You Are"	David Scott Bartky; Bob Martinez	Child	4:20
5.	"Never Say Never"	Rick Barron; Don Cromwell	Cromwell; Bruun; Barron	3:46
6.	"Unwanted Child"	Nowels; Shipley	Nowels	4:18
7.	"Who I Am"	Michael O'Hara; Denise Rich; Alan Rich	D. Rich; O'Hara	3:56
8.	"Waiting for the Heartache"	Child; Jimmy Barnes	Child	4:28
9.	"A Broken Heart"	Dave Dunhill; Mick Dash; Alan Barton; Jennifer Rush	Peter Columbus	4:07
10.	"Timeless Love" (Saraya cover)	Child	Child	3:58
11.	"I Can't Say No"	Oliver Kels; Columbus; Rush	Columbus	3:31

Spanish CD copies of the album include 4 Spanish re-recordings added to the track list.

Jennifer Rush – Spanish CD Edition
No.	Title	Writer(s)	Producer(s)	Length
1.	"Vision De Ti" (Vision of You)	Jennifer Rush (Spanish Lyrics); Jose Julien (Spanish Lyrics); Rick Nowels; Ellen Shipley	Nowels	4:31
2.	"Carne De Amor" (I'm in It for Love)	Carols Toro (Spanish Lyrics); Andy Goldmark; Patrick Henderson	Oli Poulsen; Poul Bruun	4:24
3.	"Everything"	Desmond Child; Carole Rowley; Matt Noblen	Child	4:09
4.	"Wherever You Are"	David Scott Bartky; Bob Martinez	Child	4:20
5.	"Nunca Digas Nuncas" (Never Say Never)	Jennifer Rush (Spanish Lyrics); Jose Julien (Spanish Lyrics); Rick Barron; Don Cromwell	Cromwell; Bruun; Barron	3:41
6.	"Unwanted Child"	Nowels; Shipley	Nowels	4:18
7.	"Who I Am"	Michael O'Hara; Denise Rich; Alan Rich	D. Rich; O'Hara	3:56
8.	"Waiting for the Heartache"	Child; Jimmy Barnes	Child	4:28
9.	"A Broken Heart"	Dave Dunhill; Mick Dash; Alan Barton; Jennifer Rush	Peter Columbus	4:07
10.	"Amor Sin Final" (Timeless Love)	Elena Casols (Spanish Lyrics); Child	Child	3:58
11.	"I Can't Say No"	Oliver Kels; Columbus; Rush	Columbus	3:31
12.	"Vision of You" (Not included on Spanish LP pressings)	Rick Nowels; Ellen Shipley	Nowels	4:31
13.	"I'm in It for Love" (Not included on Spanish LP pressings)	Andy Goldmark; Patrick Henderson	Oli Poulsen; Poul Bruun	4:12
14.	"Never Say Never" (Not included on Spanish LP pressings)	Rick Barron; Don Cromwell	Cromwell; Bruun; Barron	3:46
15.	"Timeless Love" (Not included on Spanish LP pressings)	Child	Child	3:58

== Charts ==
Chart performance for Jennifer Rush
Chart (1992)	Peak position
Austrian Albums (Ö3 Austria)	40
German Albums (Offizielle Top 100)	35
Swiss Albums (Schweizer Hitparade)	38
