= Credo (Jennifer Rush album) =

Studio album by Jennifer Rush
- Released: March 21, 1997
- Length: 50:11
- Label: EMI
- Producer: Barry Eastmond; Nick Patrick; Lindsay Scott (exec.)

Jennifer Rush chronology
Out of My Hands (1995)	Credo (1997)	Classics (1998)

Singles from Credo
- 1. "Credo" Released: February 14, 1997; 2. "Sweet Thing" Released: 1997

Credo is the eighth studio album by American singer Jennifer Rush. It was released by EMI Records on March 21, 1997. Rush worked with gospel and African choirs on the album who backed her on three of the tracks. Chiefly produced by Nick Patrick, eight of the eleven songs on Credo are cover versions, with two original songs co-written by Rush. Notable songs featured on the album are renditions of Cheap Trick's "The Flame" (1988) and "The Places You Find Love," originally recorded by Barbra Streisand in 1988 and then by Quincy Jones for his 1989 Back on the Block album, as well as a cover of John Farnham's 1987 Australian hit "A Touch of Paradise."

The album did enter the charts in her most loyal market, Germany, where it reached number 26 on the German Albums Chart. This was followed by "Sweet Thing," one of the few uptempo songs on the album, while "Piano in the Dark," a cover of the Brenda Russell song, was released as a promo-only single after this. Like her previous two albums, Credo went unreleased in the United Kingdom and the United States.

== Track listing ==
Credo track listing
No.	Title	Writer(s)	Producer(s)	Length
1.	"Credo"	Frank Musker; Richard Darbyshire	Nick Patrick	4:37
2.	"The Flame"	Bob Mitchell; Nick Graham	Patrick	5:44
3.	"Now That I Found You"	Barry Eastmond; Jennifer Rush	Patrick	4:51
4.	"Sweet Thing"	Angela McAlinden; Horse McDonald	Patrick	4:28
5.	"Healing Power"	Charles Judge; Dan Hill	Patrick	4:33
6.	"Piano in the Dark"	Brenda Russell; Jeff Hull; Scott Cutler	Patrick	4:42
7.	"Deeper Within"	Geoffrey Williams; Simon Stirling	Patrick	4:02
8.	"More Than Words"	Eastmond; Rush	Eastmond	3:57
9.	"A Touch of Paradise"	Gulliver Smith; Ross Wilson	Patrick	4:13
10.	"The Places You Find Love"	Clif Magness; Glen Ballard	Patrick	5:25
11.	"All in Love Is Fair"	Stevie Wonder	Patrick	3:34

Credo – Spanish Edition bonus tracks
No.	Title	Writer(s)	Length
12.	"Credo" (Versión En Castellano)	Musker; Darbyshire	4:09
13.	"Ya Que Te Tengo A Ti" (Now That I Found You)	Richmond; Rush	4:51

== Personnel ==
Credits taken from album CD booklet.

- Jennifer Rush – Vocals, Background Vocals (1–2, 4, 6–9)
- Barry J. Eastmond – Keyboards (8), Drum Programming (8)
- Bobbie Stern – Saxophone (4, 9)
- Frank Musker – Background Vocals (1)
- Gordon Chambers – Background Vocals (8)
- Grant Mitchell – Keyboards 6 Programming (4)
- Jackie Rawe – Background Vocals (4, 6–7, 9)
- Juliette Roberts – Background Vocals (4)
- Ira A. Siegel – Guitars (8)
- Kym Mazelle – Background Vocals (4)
- Luis Jardim – Bass (3, 5, 9, 11)
- Margo Buchannan – Background Vocals (4, 6–7, 9)
- Monica Reed Price – Background Vocals (4)
- Ola Ohablue – Background Vocals (6–7, 9)
- Phil Palmer – Acoustic Guitars (1), Guitars (2)
- Richard Darbyshire – Background Vocals (1–2)
- Robbie McIntosh – Guitars (3, 6–7, 9), Acoustic Guitars (5)
- Shawn Pelton – Drums (3, 11)
- Steve Pigott – Keyboards (1–2), Drum Programming (1–2)
- Steve Sidelnyk – Drum Programming (5–6, 9–10), Percussion Programming (10)
- Wix – Keyboards (3, 5–7, 9–11)
- Treehouse Choir (Background Vocals on Tracks 1, 5 and 10):
  - Sipho Mbele
  - Faith Kekana
  - Victor Nxumalo
  - Deborah Fraser
  - Morris Mbongwa
  - Stella Khumalo
  - Bonginkosi Khulu
  - Mandisa Dlanga

== Charts ==
Chart performance for Credo
Chart (1997)	Peak position
Austrian Albums (Ö3 Austria)	37
German Albums (Offizielle Top 100)	26
