= Now Is the Hour (Jennifer Rush album) =

Studio album by Jennifer Rush
- Released: March 5, 2010
- Genre: Pop
- Length: 55:08
- Label: Ariola; Sony Music
- Producer: Brix; Ingo Politz; Mathias Ramson; Bernd Wendlandt

Jennifer Rush chronology
Stronghold – The Collector's Hit Box (2007)	Now Is the Hour (2010)

Singles from Now Is the Hour
- 1. "Before the Dawn" Released: 2010; 2. "Echoes Love" Released: September 7, 2010

Now Is the Hour is the tenth studio album by American singer Jennifer Rush (and 11th album overall when counting Heidi album in 1979). It was first released by Ariola Records on March 5, 2010. As of 2026, it remains her most recent studio album despite sporadic recordings and live performances.

== Background ==
Among the songwriters that contributed to the project were Swedish music producer Jörgen Elofsson, British singer Natasha Bedingfield, and American country songwriter Sharon Vaughn.

The album was originally set for release in fall 2009, but was eventually released in March 2010.

The first single was the ballad "Before the Dawn." The album peaked at number 21 on the German Albums Chart.

== Critical reception ==
Professional ratings
Review scores
Source	Rating
AllMusic	3/5 stars

AllMusic editor Jon O'Brien found that Now Is the Hour "retains the epic power balladry of her mid-'80s heyday while also pursuing a previously unexplored dance-pop direction similar to Cher's fifty-something disco diva re-invention a decade earlier [...] For an artist so synonymous with the impassioned big-voiced vocal ballad, it's a surprise that she comes unstuck when attempting to tread the path of her signature hit, "The Power of Love," as the likes of "Before the Dawn," "Windows," and "Still" may provide the chance to showcase her impressive and slightly operatic tones, but they are so utterly unmemorable that you wish she'd had the confidence to just stick with her newfound uptempo leanings instead. Now Is the Hour might not exactly be worth a 12-year wait, but take away the perfunctory torch songs and it is a respectable comeback that suggests her one-hit wonder status is a rather unjust state of affairs."

== Track listing ==
Now Is the Hour track listing
No.	Title	Writer(s)	Producer(s)	Length
1.	"Dream Awake"	Lauren Evans; Alex James; Frederik Nordsø Schjoldan	Brix; Mathias Ramson; Frederik Nordsø; Fridolin Nordsø	3:39
2.	"Betcha Never"	Alan Ross; David James; Natasha Bedingfield	Ingo Politz; Bernd Wendlandt	3:19
3.	"Windows"	Jörgen Elofsson; Liz Rodrigues; Rikard Brandén	Politz; Wendlandt	4:08
4.	"Down on My Knees"	Niara Scarlett; Fridolin Tai; Schjoldan	Brix; Ramson	3:15
5.	"Head Above Water"	Gustav Efraimsson; Alice Gernandt	Brix; Ramson	3:54
6.	"I Never Asked for an Angel"	Nicky Chinn; Elofsson; Pär Westerlund	Politz; Wendlandt	4:21
7.	"Echoes Love"	Nermin Harambasic; Anne Judith Wik; Robin Jenssen; Ronny Svendsen	Brix; Ramson	3:37
8.	"I'm Not Dreaming Anymore"	Elofsson; Rodrigues; Westerlund	Politz; Wendlandt	3:23
9.	"Now Is the Hour"	Carl Falk; Sharon Vaughn; Christina Undhjem	Politz; Wendlandt	3:26
10.	"Like I Would for You"	John Dexter; Ron Irving; Lynda McKillip	Politz; Wendlandt	3:26
11.	"Before the Dawn"	Tony Swain; Harriet Roberts	Politz; Wendlandt	3:48
12.	"Eyes of a Woman"	Steve Lee; Matteo Saggese; Gary Bromham	Politz; Wendlandt	3:51
13.	"Just This Way"	Evans; Tai; Schjoldan	Brix; Ramson	3:52
14.	"Ain't Loved You Long Enough"	Lee; Tim Woodcock; Steve Anderson	Politz; Wendlandt	2:55
15.	"Still"	Mark Frisch; Anthony Galatis	Politz; Wendlandt	4:08
Total length:				55:08

== Charts ==
Chart performance for Now Is the Hour
Chart (2010)	Peak position
Austrian Albums (Ö3 Austria)	51
European Albums (Billboard)	74
German Albums (Offizielle Top 100)	21
Greek International Albums (IFPI)	6
Swiss Albums (Schweizer Hitparade)	61
