= Superman (Black Lace song) =

1981 novelty song by Claudio Cecchetto and Claudio Simonetti

Single by Black Lace

from the album Party Party
- B-side: "Teardrops in Your Eyes"
- Released: September 1983
- Recorded: Early–mid 1983 at Woodlands Studio, Normanton
- Genre: Pop; novelty; synth-pop
- Length: 3:35 (album/single version); 4:56 (12" version)
- Label: Carrere Records (France); Flair Records (UK)
- Songwriter(s): Claudio Cecchetto, Claudio Simonetti

Black Lace singles chronology
"Mary Ann" (1979)	"Superman" (1983)	"Hey You" (1983)

"Superman", also titled "Gioca Jouer", is a 1981 novelty song, written by Italian musicians Claudio Cecchetto and Claudio Simonetti, and most famous in the UK for the 1983 recording by Black Lace. The UK single's B-side, "Teardrops in Your Eyes", was an original composition by Black Lace's Alan Barton and Colin Routh.

== Overview ==
The original version of the song, "Gioca Jouer", had great success in Italy, also being the Festival di Sanremo of 1981 opening theme. In the summer, the song arrived in Spain, and became very popular in discos. John Wagtaff (head of Flair Records) heard it while looking for a style of music that would be popular in the United Kingdom. When translated into English, "Gioca Jouer" became "Superman".

The song featured a number of dance gestures that acted out the lyrics – including sleeping, waving, hitching a ride, sneezing, walking, swimming, skiing, spraying deodorant, sounding a horn, ringing a bell, flexing muscles as a "Macho Man", making the letters "OK", blowing kisses, combing, and a pose imitating the DC Comics character Superman. These dance moves were detailed on the record sleeve.

On the Black Lace recording, the intro drum fill was played by Wakefield drummer Barry Huffinley; the remaining rhythm was programmed using a sequencer. The song was recorded at Woodlands Studio in Normanton, West Yorkshire. In 1987, Colin Gibb released an alternative version of the song with explicit lyrics, entitled "Supercock".

Laddi recorded an Icelandic version for his 1983 album "Allt í Lagi Með Það".

== Reception ==
The single was released in the UK in September 1983; its first UK chart appearance was on 10 September, when it was ranked No. 94. It peaked at No. 9 on 22 October, and was last on the chart at No. 73 on 21 January 1984, having spent 20 weeks in the top 100. The song was released in 1984 on the group's debut album, Party Party, which reached No. 4 on the UK Albums Chart. The song has become a staple of many children's parties in the UK, and the subject of many covers, mainly for children.

== Analysis ==
Some analysts (including Paul Simpson and The Guardian's Will Dean) draw parallels between the song and Friedrich Nietzsche's Übermensch concept.

== See also ==
- Cha Cha Slide a similar track by DJ Casper from 2000
