= Sweet Thing (Horse McDonald song) =

1990 song by Horse McDonald

Single by Horse McDonald

from the album The Same Sky
- B-side: Cat Dancing; A Place Like Today; It's All My Heart Could Do
- Released: 1990
- Genre: Pop rock
- Length: 4:08
- Label: Capitol Records
- Songwriters: Horse McDonald; Angela McAlinden
- Producer: Pete Smith

Horse McDonald singles chronology
"The Speed of the Beat of My Heart" (1990)	"Sweet Thing" (1990)	"Careful" (1990)

"Sweet Thing" is a song co-written and originally recorded by Scottish singer-songwriter Horse McDonald. It was released as a single in 1990 as the third single from her debut album The Same Sky and reached the single charts in the United Kingdom and Germany. It was covered by Jennifer Rush in 1997 for her album Credo.

== Background ==
The single reached number 96 in the United Kingdom and number 58 in Germany, and was Horse's only charting single in the latter country.

=== Track listings ===
- 7-inch single / Cassette single
1. "Sweet Thing" – 4:08
2. "Cat Dancing" – 3:45
- 12-inch single / CD single
1. "Sweet Thing" – 4:08
2. "A Place Like Today" – 3:34
3. "Cat Dancing" – 3:45
4. "It's All My Heart Could Do" – 3:01

== Charts ==
Chart (1990)	Peak position
Germany (GfK)	58
UK Singles (OCC)	96

== Jennifer Rush version ==
"Sweet Thing"

Single by Jennifer Rush

from the album Credo
- Released: May 1997
- Length: 4:28
- Label: EMI Records
- Songwriters: Horse McDonald; Angela McAlinden
- Producer: Nick Patrick

Jennifer Rush singles chronology
"Credo" (1997)	"Sweet Thing" (1997)	"The End of a Journey" (1998)

"Sweet Thing" was covered by American singer Jennifer Rush for her 1997 album Credo. It was released as the second single from the album.

=== Track listing ===
- German CD single
1. "Sweet Thing" (Single Edit) – 3:55
2. "Sweet Thing" (Album version) – 4:28
3. "Credo" (Spanish version) – 4:09

=== Charts ===
Chart (1997)	Peak position
Poland Airplay (Music & Media)	17
