= Black Lace =

British pop band

- Genres: Novelty, pop
- Years active: 1973–2002; 2009–present; 2002–2024 ("The Original Black Lace")

Black Lace are a British pop band best known for novelty party records, including their biggest hit "Agadoo", as well as "Superman" and "Do the Conga".

They first came to the public eye when they represented the United Kingdom in the Eurovision Song Contest 1979 with the song "Mary Ann". At that time, the band consisted of Colin Gibb (known as Colin Routh until 1987), Alan Barton, Steve Scholey and Terry Dobson. The band has undergone numerous line-up changes, with Scholey and Dobson leaving in 1981, followed by Barton in 1987 (he died in 1995). Gibb, with the exception of a brief departure during 1986–1987, stayed until 2002, though he continued performing with a separate band dubbed The Original Black Lace until his death in 2024. Other former members include Dene Michael and Rob Hopcraft.

Since 2023, Black Lace has consisted of Phil Temple and 2008 Britain's Got Talent contestant Craig Harper.

== History ==
=== Pre-Black Lace (1969–1973) ===
In 1969, musicians and school-friends Terry Dobson and Ian Howarth formed pop group The Impact, recruiting Alan Barton, Steve Scholey and Nigel Scott. Over the next four years, the group changed their name to Penny Arcade and then to Love or Confusion. Scott left in 1973, with the remaining four members continuing under another new name, Black Lace.

=== Black Lace (1974–1980) ===
Ian Howarth was replaced by Colin Routh during late spring 1976. Shortly after, under the management of Keith Mills, the band turned professional and toured the majority of the UK, commencing their first summer season at the Skegness Central Pier Bier.

The following year their summer season would take them to Butlins in Filey, North Yorkshire and Skegness, Lincolnshire. An EP was recorded and produced by comedian Freddie 'Parrot face' Davies at his studio, which was to be sold at their shows. The group were voted Yorkshire Band of the Year by BBC Radio Leeds, and best clubland group playing at the Winter Gardens, Blackpool.

In 1979, Black Lace recorded their first single, "Mary Ann", for ATV Music; a recording contract followed with EMI. As the song required a more 'throaty' vocal, it was decided that Alan Barton would be lead singer on the band's recordings, with Steve Scholey on backing vocals, but that Scholey would remain as lead singer for live performances. The song won BBC Television's A Song For Europe and the band went on to represent the United Kingdom at the Eurovision Song Contest 1979 held in Israel, where they finished seventh. Other television appearances around this time included Nationwide, Multi-Coloured Swap Shop, Top of the Pops and Juke Box Jury. "Mary Ann" reached No. 42 on the UK Singles Chart.

The band's follow-up single, "So Long Suzy Baby", failed to chart in the UK (as EMI could not decide on which track should be used, and delayed the planned release date), but achieved success in Europe. Black Lace found success with live performances and TV shows, notably the Sopot International Song Festival in Poland, the Golden Orpheus festival in Bulgaria, and on TV in East Germany, West Germany and Spain.

The band toured Denmark in 1980, supporting Suzi Quatro and working with Tommy Seebach, a Danish entertainer. Black Lace and Seebach recorded "Hey Hey Jock McRay" for the Danish singles market, but an intended 1980 tour of Poland was called off because of political unrest in the country.

=== Chart success (1981–1990) ===
In 1981, the band split. Dobson joined the Castleford rock band Stormer, who had a recording contract with Ringo Starr, while Scholey left the music industry.

Routh and Barton were left to settle huge debts incurred whilst touring. They continued as a duo initially under the name Lace, but soon reverted back to Black Lace and recruited a new manager, John Wagstaff. The duo signed to Wagstaff's label Flair Records and played the Northern club circuit using pre-recorded backing tracks, which was controversial at the time. They recorded an instrumental single based on the "Chicken Dance", released as "Birds Dance" in 1981 (using the name "Buzby" instead of Black Lace) However, the record was beaten to the charts by another version of the song by The Tweets, released as "The Birdie Song". "Birds Dance" has since been retitled "The Birdie Song" and included on Black Lace albums.

Black Lace's 1983 "Superman" single was their first under their own name on the Flair label, and a promotional video was shot at Casanova's nightclub in Wakefield. One of the hired dancers was the then unknown singer Jane McDonald. "Superman" reached No. 9 in the UK chart, though there was some controversy and accusations of plagiarism as the song was originally performed by Chris and Anthea Reed during the summer season at Barmston Beach and was not written by Black Lace as the band claimed. This also included the iconic dance moves used with the song. Black Lace had recorded them performing it and then released it as their own. The Reeds began legal action but did not have copyright protection, which allowed Black Lace to continue with the release. The follow-up single, an original song called "Hey You!", failed to chart, despite being BBC Radio One's Record of the Week. Black Lace received a silver disc for sales of "Superman". They proceeded to tour Denmark with Danish stars Laban and Snapshots.

The band's biggest success came in 1984 with the single "Agadoo", selling more than one million copies worldwide, and reaching No. 2 in the UK chart. "Agadoo" was a hit in Europe, South Africa and Australia. Having been presented with a gold disc for sales in the UK, presenter Richard Whiteley forgot Routh's name and referred to him as "Mr. Agadoo" (the name Dene Michael later adopted for himself, despite having no involvement with the record). The duo recorded their first album, Party Party – 16 Great Party Icebreakers, at Stuck Ranch studios in Denmark. Around this time, their record distribution company Pinnacle went into receivership, leading to Black Lace and their record company losing an estimated quarter of a million pounds in unpaid royalties for "Agadoo".

The band's follow-up single, "Do The Conga", reached No. 10 in the UK chart, and the accompanying album Party Party – 16 Great Party Icebreakers sold more than 650,000 copies in the first five weeks, reaching double platinum status and leading to the band doing TV shows in Germany, Luxembourg, France and Denmark.

In 1985, another single, "El Vino Collapso", was released, with the video shot in Skegness. It failed to reach the top 40, stalling at No. 42 in the UK Singles Chart owing to it being "banned" by the BBC in the wake of the Heysel Stadium disaster. As it had references to "drinking whilst abroad", it was deemed unsuitable for radio play. Further releases "I Speaka Da Lingo" and "Hokey Cokey" reached No. 49 and No. 31, respectively.

Black Lace also participated in the recording of the UK No. 1 hit "You'll Never Walk Alone" as part of the charity ensemble The Crowd, which included members of 10cc, Thin Lizzy, Motörhead, The Hollies, Argent, The Who, The Nolans, The Searchers, Smokie, Gerry and the Pacemakers, plus many more, to raise funds for the families of the victims of the Bradford City stadium fire.

Black Lace's second album, Party Party 2, was released for Christmas 1985, and television appearances included The Old Grey Whistle Test, 3-2-1, ITV Telethon, Miss Yorkshire Television, International Disco Dance Championship, Pebble Mill at One and the Top of the Pops Christmas Special. Because of such a demanding work schedule, Barton and Routh found it necessary to charter a private aircraft to meet the deadlines, but the band's success led to a tax demand in excess of £100,000.

In 1986, Routh stepped back from Black Lace after a court case resulting from his relationship with an under-age girl. He was replaced by Dene Michael.

The first single from the Barton/Michael duo, "Viva La Mexico", was released to capitalise on the 1986 FIFA World Cup football competition, but flopped when England were knocked out. The follow-up, "Wig Wam Bam", reached No. 63 in the UK chart. The band were immortalised as caricatures in the TV show Spitting Image, with the show's hit single "The Chicken Song" being a Black Lace parody. 1986 also saw the band release their third album, Party Crazy.

Black Lace appeared as themselves in the 1987 film Rita, Sue and Bob Too, performing the song "Gang Bang". Colin Routh, now using the name Colin Gibb, returned to the band in September that year, while Barton left to join Smokie. Gibb and Michael played summer seasons at the Blackpool Tower in 1989 and 1990, plus performances at the BBC Radio One Roadshow in the town. In 1989, the band released their first single for three years, "I Am The Music Man", which peaked at No. 52 in the UK.

=== Later career (1991–2022) ===
In 1991, Michael was replaced by Rob Hopcraft.

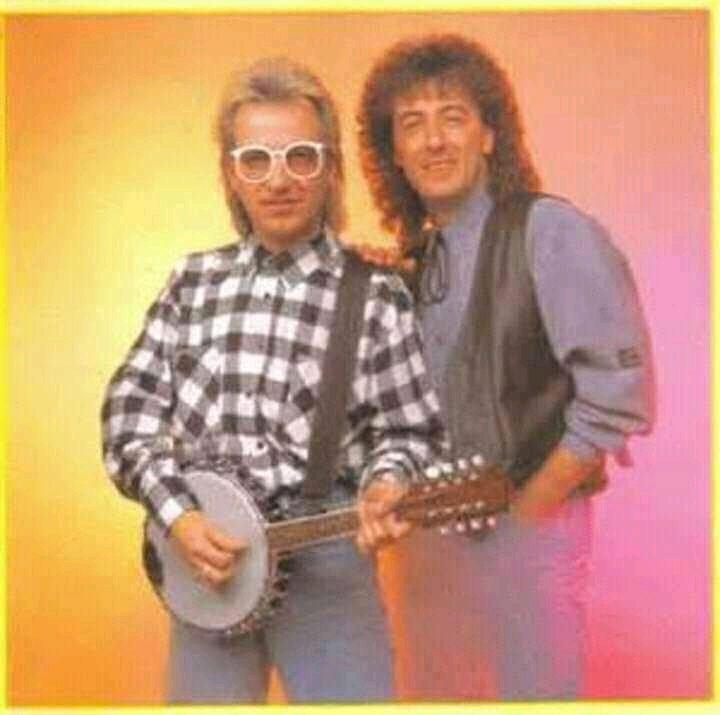
Gibb and Hopcraft in 1994

In 1995, Alan Barton died as a result of a coach crash in Germany while touring with Smokie.

Black Lace played one-off shows in 1996 at DJ conventions in Canada and Atlantic City, New Jersey, United States. They also released the Action Party and Best of albums that year. Gibb was presented with a special Agadoo guitar to celebrate the band's 20th anniversary, but he was also made bankrupt by the Inland Revenue.

15 August 1997 was dubbed Agadoo Day. Black Lace played twenty shows in 24 hours in Manchester, London, Watford, Northampton, Sheffield, Barnsley, Wakefield and Leeds, finishing at the Frontier Club, Batley. The event raised more than £25,000 for Marie Curie Cancer Care. Peugeot used "Agadoo" in a TV advertisement for the new 106 car, and Black Lace re-recorded the song as "Agadoo (106 dance mix)", donating all their royalties to Marie Curie Cancer Care. The single spent a week in the UK chart.

In 2000, Hopcraft was replaced by singers/dancers Katie and Camille, the latter the daughter of the band's manager John Wagstaff. This line-up released a cover of The Soca Boys' Dutch hit "Follow the Leader", a song which would become a Top 10 hit by Nigel & Marvin when remixed as "Follow Da Leader", with the tune from Chocolate Puma's hit "I Wanna Be U".

In 2002, Colin Gibb chose to leave the UK and move to Tenerife, playing the now internationally famous "party shows" in hotels and restaurants on the island, occasionally visiting the UK for TV appearances. Because of this, Flair Records launched a TV reality show in the style of The X Factor called Agadoo: The Search for the New Black Lace, to assemble a new UK-based band called "The New Black Lace", while Gibb would perform in Tenerife as "The Original Black Lace". The 4-episode show featured Gibb and manager John Wagstaff as the judges, and was shown on ITV's regional Yorkshire TV service, with the winners releasing a version of Kool and the Gang's "Celebration" as their winner's single.

In 2009, Black Lace was officially reformed as a duo of late 1980s member Dene Michael and new member Ian Robinson. In 2015, a television advertisement for Walkers crisps was shown on British TV, featuring Michael and Robinson performing alongside Gary Lineker singing along to "Agadoo". In this year, Michael had also appeared alongside Esmée Denters and Eurovision hopeful Joe Woolford on an episode of BBC One's The Voice UK. By this time, Gibb had started to perform Original Black Lace shows in Playa de las Américas and Los Cristianos with Scottish singer and Oasis FM radio presenter Gordon King, an artist who had issued a solo album under his real name, Gordon Quinn, in the 1970s.

In 2016, Dene Michael was jailed for six months for benefit fraud after falsely claiming almost £25,000 for his sciatica, with his wife and "carer", Karen, getting a 12-month community order for her role in the scam, with the judge sentencing her to 100 hours of unpaid work.

By 2018, Michael was back performing in the clubs, having teamed up with a Kylie Minogue tribute act called Vikki B and a duo called Party Crazy. Michael had been billing himself as "Mr. Agadoo" by this point in his career, even though he did not appear on the original record, and would find himself back in the official Wagstaff-managed version of Black Lace later in the year.

In 2019, Gibb's Tenerife-based Original Black Lace became associated with UK dressage team The Agadoo Girls, consisting of seven members, with Gibb's cousin Debbie Cox as team captain. They came top at their debut Team Quest competition at Richmond Equestrian Centre in June that year.

=== Recent career (2023–present) ===
Since 2023, Black Lace has been a duo of Phil Temple and Craig Harper, the latter a vocalist and comedian who has previously appeared on Britain's Got Talent, Barrymore and Star for a Night.

On 13 May 2024, Colin Gibb announced his retirement on Facebook. His last performance was at the San Eugenio Villa Adeje Beach Hotel in Spain, on 16 May. On 3 June 2024, the band, alongside Gibb's wife, revealed Gibb had died aged 70 the previous day.

On 8 September 2024, Temple and Harper appeared as special guests at Radio 2 in the Park, Preston 2024 as part of Paddy McGuinness' Sunday School Disco. Two months later, they appeared on the BBC One Children in Need programme Paddy: The Ride of My Life, where they were seen performing "Agadoo" alongside Paddy McGuinness and Sir Chris Hoy in the car park of Westmorland's Cairn Lodge Services.

In November 2025, a documentary called Still Pushing Pineappples by Kim Hopkins was released; it follows former member Dene Michael as he performs Black Lace's hits from Blackpool to Benidorm. The film received 3 stars in Peter Bradshaw's Guardian review, with Bradshaw noting that the documentary "has a kind of melancholy that Martin Parr might have wanted to photograph".

== Personnel ==
Members

- Craig Harper – vocals (2018–present)
- Phil Temple – vocals (2023–present)

Former members

- Alan Barton – vocals, guitar (1973–1987; died 1995)
- Terry Dobson – vocals, drums (1973–1981)
- Steve Scholey – vocals, bass guitar (1973–1981)
- Ian Howarth – vocals, guitar (1973–1976)
- Colin Gibb (known as Colin Routh until 1987) – vocals, guitar, bass guitar, banjo, keyboards (1976–1986, 1987–2002; "The Original Black Lace" Tenerife band 2002–2024; died 2024)
- Dene Michael – vocals, guitar (1986–1991, 2009–2023)
- Rob Hopcraft – vocals (1991–2000; died 2020)
- Camille – vocals (2000–2002)
- Katie – vocals (2000–2002)
- Ian Robinson – vocals, guitar (2009–2018)
- Gordon King – vocals, guitar ("The Original Black Lace" Tenerife band 2015–2022)

== Discography ==
=== Albums ===
- 1984: Party Party (UK No. 4)
- 1985: Party Party 2 (UK No. 18)
- 1986: Party Crazy (UK No. 58)
- 1987: 16 Greatest Party Hits
- 1989: 20 All Time Party Favourites
- 1993: Action Party
- 1995: Saturday Night
- 1996: The Very Best of Black Lace
- 1997: Greatest Hits
- 1998: What a Party
- 1999: Going to a Party
- 2000: Greatest Ever Party Album
- 2001: Party Party Party
- 2010: The Blue Album
- 2011: The Essential Collection
- 2014: Live Beach Party
- 2019: The Very Best Party Party
- 2023: The Party Album

=== Singles ===
Year	Single	Peak chart positions					
Year	Single	AUS	FRA	IRE	NZ	SA	UK
1979	"Mary Ann"	—	—	19	—	—	42
1979	"So Long Suzi Baby"	—	—	—	—	—	—
1980	"Hey Hey Jock McRay" (Denmark-only release)	—	—	—	—	—	—
1982	"Birds Dance" (aka "The Birdie Song") (as 'Buzby')	—	—	—	—	—	—
1983	"Superman (Gioca Jouer)"	—	—	25	—	—	9
1983	"Hey You"	—	—	—	—	—	—
1984	"Agadoo"	16	48	5	9	3	2
1984	"Do the Conga"	—	—	12	—	—	10
1985	"El Vino Collapso"	—	—	—	—	—	42
1985	"I Speaka da Lingo"	—	—	—	—	—	49
1985	"Hokey Cokey"	—	—	—	—	—	31
1986	"Viva la Mexico"	—	—	—	—	—	79
1986	"Wig-Wam Bam"	—	—	—	—	—	63
1989	"I Am the Music Man"	—	—	—	—	—	52
1990	"Gang Bang"	—	—	—	—	—	90
1990	"Jammin' the 60's" (as 'Barracuda')	—	—	—	—	—	—
1992	"Penny Arcade"	—	—	—	—	—	—
1994	"Bullsh*t (Cotton-Eyed Joe)"	—	—	—	—	—	83
1996	"The Electric Slide" (featuring The Electric Boogie Line Dance)	—	—	—	—	—	83
1997	"Macarena"	—	—	—	—	—	—
1998	"Agadoo (106 Dance Mix)"	—	—	—	—	—	64
2000	"Follow the Leader"	—	—	—	—	—	—
2009	"Mega-Mega Mix" (Spain-only release)	—	—	—	—	—	—
2009	"Agadoo Mambo"	—	—	—	—	—	—
2009	"The Music Man 09"	—	—	—	—	—	—
2010	"We Are the England Fans"	—	—	—	—	—	—
2011	"Do the Conga (Trainline Mix)"	—	—	—	—	—	—
2015	"Agadoo (Crisp Mix)"	—	—	—	—	—	—
2015	"Agadoo (Space Mix)"	—	—	—	—	—	—
2025	"Left and Right"	—	—	—	—	—	—
"—" denotes releases that did not chart or were not released

Awards and achievements
Preceded by Co-Co with "The Bad Old Days"	United Kingdom in the Eurovision Song Contest; 1979	Succeeded by Prima Donna with "Love Enough for Two"
