= Credo (Jennifer Rush song) =

Single by Jennifer Rush

from the album Credo
- B-side: "Fortress"
- Released: 14 February 1997
- Length: 4:37
- Label: EMI
- Songwriters: Frank Musker; Richard Darbyshire
- Producer: Nick Patrick

Jennifer Rush singles chronology
"Out of My Hands" (1995)	"Credo" (1997)	"Sweet Thing" (1997)

Music video
- "Credo" on YouTube

"Credo" is a 1997 song recorded by Jennifer Rush. It was written by Frank Musker and Richard Darbyshire and was released in February 1997 as the first single from the album of the same name. Jennifer also recorded Castilian version for the Spanish pressing of the album.

The single's b-side "Fortress" was originally released on Jennifer's previous album Out of My Hands. The b-side version was a remix by British singer-songwriter David Austin, who co-wrote the original song.

== Track list ==
- German CD maxi-single
1. "Credo" (Single version) – 3:59
2. "Fortress" (Remix 1997) – 5:05
3. "Credo" (Album version) – 4:37
- Spanish CD promo
1. "Credo" (Version en Castellano) – 4:09
2. "Credo" (Version en Ingles) – 4:37

== Charts ==
Chart (1997)	Peak position
Austria (Ö3 Austria Top 40)	32
Germany (GfK)	75
Poland Airplay (Music & Media)	13
