= Graham Shaw (musician) =

Canadian composer and rock singer

- Born: Calgary, Alberta, Canada
- Origin: Winnipeg, Manitoba, Canada
- Occupations: Singer; songwriter; musician; composer
- Instruments: Vocals; guitar; keyboards
- Years active: 1965–present
- Label: True North
- Formerly of: The Deverons; The Sincere Serenaders

Graham Shaw is a Canadian singer, songwriter, musician and composer most notable for winning the Juno Award for Most Promising Male Vocalist at the Juno Awards of 1981.

Originally from Winnipeg, Manitoba, Shaw performed in several local bands — including a stint in the Deverons alongside Burton Cummings before Cummings left to join the Guess Who in 1965. He formed the band the Sincere Serenaders in 1977, and signed a recording contract with Capitol Records. Shaw later revealed that the Capitol contract was for him as a solo artist, and that when he was preparing to record the band's debut studio album the label pressured him to fire the band and rely on session musicians, although he refused. The band's self-titled debut studio album was released by Capitol in 1980, and had top 40 hits in Canada with "Can I Come Near" (#15) and "French Lady" (#32).

The band signed to True North Records for their second studio album, Good Manners in the 1980's, in 1981. The album was less successful, however, and Shaw concentrated on session and jingle work for several years thereafter. Shaw contributed keyboards and backing vocals to Alice Cooper's eighth solo studio album DaDa (1983), for which he also co-wrote three of its tracks: "Enough's Enough", "Dyslexia" and "I Love America".

In 1985, Shaw participated in the Northern Lights project as a chorus member on the charity single "Tears Are Not Enough". The Sincere Serenaders have never released another album, although they have sometimes performed reunion concerts in Winnipeg.

Shaw later concentrated primarily on television composing work, including the theme songs to the children's television series Theodore Tugboat, CBC News programs such as Venture, Marketplace and nearly the entire CBC Newsworld schedule, and Esso's "You're on your way with Esso" jingle.

He released the solo studio album Raw Shaw, his first recording since Good Manners in the 1980s, independently in 2008.

== Solo discography ==
Studio albums

- Good Manners in the 1980's (1981)
- Raw Shaw (2008)

Singles

- "Jolene" (1981)
- "I Can't Say No to You" (1981)
