= Flames of Paradise =

1987 single by Jennifer Rush and Elton John

Single by Jennifer Rush and Elton John

from the album Heart over Mind
- Released: June 1987
- Length: 3:58 (single version); 4:42 (album version)
- Label: CBS
- Songwriters: Bruce Roberts; Andy Goldmark
- Producers: Bruce Roberts; Andy Goldmark

Jennifer Rush singles chronology
"I Come Undone" (1987)	"Flames of Paradise" (1987)	"Heart over Mind" (1987)

Elton John singles chronology
"Slow Rivers" (1986)	"Flames of Paradise" (1987)	"Your Song (Live)" (1987)

Music video
- "Flames of Paradise" on YouTube

"Flames of Paradise" is a 1987 song recorded by American singer Jennifer Rush and British singer Elton John. It was the second single released from Rush's album Heart over Mind.

The song reached top 10 positions on the music charts in Switzerland and West Germany. Additionally, it reached the top 20 in Canada and New Zealand, and the top 40 in Australia and the United States. It is Jennifer Rush's highest charting single on the Billboard Hot 100 and her only top-40 single.

== Music video ==
The music video was directed by Nick Morris and produced by Fiona O'Mahoney for MGMM.

== Track listings ==
- German 7-inch single
1. "Flames of Paradise" (Single version) – 3:58
2. "Call My Name" – 4:13
- German 12-inch single
1. "Flames of Paradise" (Extended Remix)^{[a]} – 5:36
2. "Call My Name" – 4:13
3. "Flames of Paradise" (Single version) – 3:58
- U.K. 12-inch single
1. "Flames of Paradise" (Extended Remix)^{[a]} – 5:36
2. "Flames of Paradise" (Instrumental Remix)^{[a]} – 5:00
3. "Call My Name" – 4:13
- Canadian 12-inch single
1. "Flames of Paradise" (Extended Remix)^{[a]} – 5:36
2. "Flames of Paradise" (Instrumental Remix)^{[a]} – 5:00
3. "Flames of Paradise" (Single version) – 3:58

Notes

- ^{^[a]} remixed by Chris Lord-Alge.
- The extended remix was later included on the 2007 box set Stronghold – The Collector's Hit Box.

== Charts ==
Chart (1987)	Peak position
Australia (Kent Music Report)	31
Canada Top Singles (RPM)	17
Canada Adult Contemporary (RPM)	15
European Hot 100 Singles (Music & Media)	33
Switzerland (Schweizer Hitparade)	7
New Zealand (Recorded Music NZ)	14
UK Singles (Official Charts)	59
US Billboard Hot 100	36
US Adult Contemporary (Billboard)	32
West Germany (GfK)	8

== Release history ==
Region	Date	Label	Format(s)	Cat. No.	Ref.
United Kingdom	1 June 1987	CBS	7-inch; 12-inch	650865 7; 650865 6	
