= Horse McDonald =

Scottish singer-songwriter

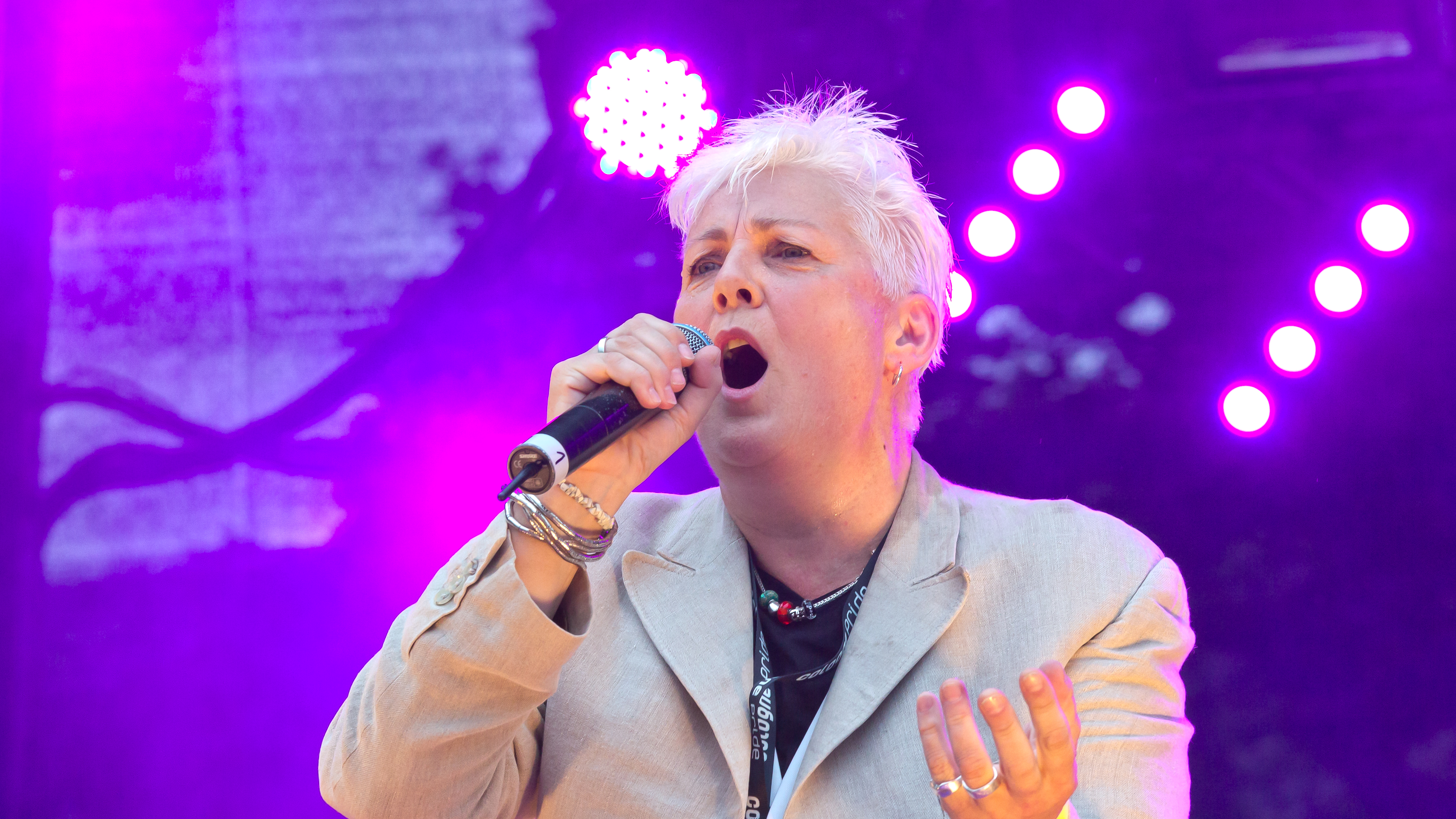
- Horse McDonald performing at ColognePride 2014

Background information
- Born: 22 November 1958 (age 67); Newport-on-Tay, Fife, Scotland
- Origin: Anstruther, Fife, Scotland
- Genres: Indie, soul, pop
- Occupation: Musician
- Instruments: Vocals, guitar
- Years active: 1987–present
- Labels: EMI, Capitol, MCA, Randan, Kosmic Music
- Website: HORSEMcDonald.com

Sheena Mary McDonald (born 22 November 1958), also known by her stage name Horse McDonald, is a Scottish singer-songwriter.

McDonald has released eight studio albums, two live albums and one compilation album, making eleven albums in total. She has also released remastered editions of two of her earliest studio albums.

== Early Life ==
McDonald was born on 22 November 1958 in Newport on Tay, Fife, Scotland and grew up in Anstruther, also in Fife.

== Career ==
Horse McDonald was performing by 1977, as part of a duo playing cover songs. McDonald and songwriter Angela McAlinden began working together as musicians and songwriters, a partnership that lasted 19 years. They initially performed under the name Rhesus Negative, before performing as Astrakhan. By 1982, Astrakhan contributed "...And She Smiled" to Melody Maker's Playback feature; an excerpt was later issued on the magazine's Playback – The Flexi. The song was subsequently included on McDonald's debut album, where it was credited to McDonald and McAlinden.

In 1985, Astrakhan released "The Power Of Touch", credited to McDonald on vocals, with McAlinden and Eileen Mulligan on backing vocals, Robin Rankin as engineer and Tinkånteen as producer. Astrakhan made their television debut on Clyde Cablevision in 1986, performing "The Picture Completely" and "The Power of Touch".

In May 1986, McDonald and guitarist McAlinden secured a publishing deal with SBK Songs. The signing enabled them to assemble a band comprising Graham Brierton on bass, George Hutchinson on guitar, Tony Soave on drums and Allan Dumbreck on keyboards. Hutchinson initially played as one of several backing musicians before becoming a regular member. By the start of 1987, the band, formerly known as Astrakhan, had adopted the name Horse, after its lead singer. In January, they performed at Glasgow's Third Eye Centre, where they attracted the attention of the music industry. Record company interest increased after the group appeared on the former UK television music programme The Tube in spring 1987. They also appeared on Scottish Television's The Terry Neason Show. The Third Eye Centre showcase and performances on television attracted record-company interest and Capitol Records signed the band at Christmas 1987. During the recording of Horse's debut album, McDonald was recovering from two operations for a cyst on her vocal cords. In an interview with Billy Sloan, she explained that her recovery required ten days of complete silence followed by two months of vocal rest. She was uncertain whether she would be able to sing again, but later found that her vocal range had increased by several notes.

In March 1989, Horse released their debut single, "You Could Be Forgiven", with "Somebody" as the B-side, and toured the UK supporting B. B. King, beginning on 8 March. The single was released by Capitol Records in the UK, with sister company EMI helping to produce the video. Horse also toured with Tina Turner during the 1980s.

The Same Sky is the debut studio album by Horse, released on the 18 of June 1990 by Capitol Records. The album contains ten tracks, including "The Speed of the Beat of My Heart", "Never Not Going To", "Sweet Thing" and "Careful". Most of the album was produced by Pete Smith, with McDonald producing the track "Stay". The songs were written by McDonald and guitarist McAlinden. The album entered the UK Albums Chart in June 1990, reaching number 44 and spending two weeks in the chart.

On 27 October 1996, McDonald performed at the Stonewall Equality Show at the Royal Albert Hall, alongside artists including Robbie Williams, Lesley Garrett and Erasure. The show was part of a series of fundraising events for Stonewall directed by Ian McKellen. Around this time, McDonald had decided to pursue a solo career.

In 2001, McDonald collaborated with Paul Leonard-Morgan on her album Hindsight... It's a Wonderful Thing. Leonard-Morgan co-produced the album with McDonald and arranged the string, brass and choir parts.

In 2010, television presenter Lorraine Kelly appeared in the music video for McDonald's single "Something Wicked This Way Comes", after McDonald invited her to take part. In 2013, McDonald and Kelly both appeared in the "It's Time" campaign, a video campaign launched by the Equality Network in support of equal marriage in Scotland.

McDonald toured in March 2011, playing an acoustic set.

She performed "Beechwood Avenue" with Heather Peace in June 2011, at GoGo Festival in Headcorn, Kent, and later at an impromptu concert at Sloans in Glasgow. In 2012, McDonald co-wrote several songs with Peace for Peace's debut album Fairytales.

McDonald appeared on the 2012 charity single "It Does Get Better" created by The L Project. The single benefitted LGBT charities and was written in response to the suicide of LGBT teenagers.

Photographer Kris Kesiak began working with McDonald in 2012, when he photographed publicity material for her album Home. Their collaboration has since taken in live performances, promotional photography, the filming of "So, Kiss Me", and publicity for her play Careful, as well as the Live at Queen's Hall DVD.

In January 2013 she married her long-term partner, Alanna, in Lanark, where she lived as a teenager.

She performed at the Barrowland Ballroom in Glasgow on 2 March 2013 with the Scottish Chamber Orchestra, celebrating the 20th anniversary of her album God's Home Movie and featuring songs from her ninth album Home.

In 2017, McDonald was inducted into the Saltire Society's Outstanding Women of Scotland community.

Horse reissued her 1993 album God's Home Movie as a 25th-anniversary remastered edition in 2018. The remastering was carried out by Ross Hamilton at Rocket Science.

McDonald has undertaken charitable and community work, including serving as an ambassador for Nordoff–Robbins music therapy. In April and May 2018, she visited New Struan School, performing for pupils and returning to support pupils in creating and producing their own music tracks. She has also been a patron of Switchboard, an LGBT+ helpline, and an ambassador for the Clutha Trust, an arts and music charity.

In June 2018, McDonald won the DIVA Hall of Fame award at the Barclays DIVA Awards.

Her portrait was painted by Roxana Halls in 2019. It was acquired by the Scottish National Portrait Gallery in 2020, where it now hangs.

McDonald stood in for Iain Anderson as presenter of The Iain Anderson Show on BBC Radio Scotland on various occasions between 2019 and 2021. During 2020, McDonald came into contact with Kim Edgar while standing in for Anderson, and the two later collaborated on "Save Myself (Run Away)". They co-wrote the song, with McDonald providing vocals, and it was released on Edgar's 2023 album Consequences.

In 2022, McDonald released "Leaving", her first new single in six years, following "Bring Him Home" in 2016. The song was written by McDonald and Gordon Turner and recorded at Rocket Science in Glasgow. The music video for "Leaving" was shot by photographer Kris Kesiak, who also designed the single cover. It was filmed at the National Theatre of Scotland. Kesiak subsequently worked on the visual material for McDonald's eighth studio album, producing photography and video for its crowdfunding campaign, album artwork, vinyl packaging and merchandise. He also produced the music video for the album's title track and contributed backing vocals to "Superpower". In 2023, McDonald launched the Kickstarter campaign to fund her album, The Road Less Travelled, which raised £7,313 from 155 backers against a £6,000 target. The album The Road Less Travelled and its title-track single were released on 25 May 2024 on McDonald's independent record label, Randan Records. The album was launched that day with matinee and evening performances at the Centre for Contemporary Arts. The album was released on CD and in a limited-edition, gatefold, hand-numbered red vinyl pressing produced by Seabass Vinyl.

On the 21st of June 2025, a remastered vinyl edition of The Same Sky was released to mark the album's 35th anniversary. Remastered by Ross Hamilton, the limited-edition pressing featured white vinyl with powder-blue marbling and an insert containing lyrics and credits. Pre-orders were announced on 16 June 2025, ahead of the anniversary of the album's original release on 18 June.

McDonald returned to the Barrowland Ballroom in January 2026 with the Scottish Chamber Orchestra, conducted by long-time collaborator Paul Leonard-Morgan, for a special performance as part of Celtic Connections. The concert marked the 30th anniversary of McDonald's original 1995 collaboration with the orchestra at the venue. The 1995 concert featured arrangements crafted by Audrey Riley and was the first time an orchestra had performed at the Barrowland. The concert was subsequently recorded and released as the 2000 album Both Sides, credited to McDonald with the Scottish Chamber Orchestra. At the end of the 2026 concert, McDonald was inducted into the Barrowland Hall of Fame and presented with a certificate by Billy Coyle. The performance also coincided with the 35th anniversary of her debut album, The Same Sky.

In 2026, Lorraine Kelly described McDonald as a close friend on BBC Radio 2's Tracks of My Years, where she chose McDonald's "Careful" as her favourite song. Kelly recalled that McDonald had visited her home and performed the song for her in her garden.

== Discography ==
=== Albums ===
Title	Album details	Peak chart positions			
Title	Album details	UK	SCO	UK Indie	UK DL
The Same Sky	Released: 18 June 1990; Label: Capitol Records/Echo Chamber; Formats: LP (EST 2123), CS (TCEST 2123), CD (CDEST 2123); Remaster Vinyl, (RANHVIN03) LP, (RANHVIN03) 2025	44	–	–	–
God's Home Movie	Released: 1993; Label: MCA Records/Oxygen; Formats: LP (MCA 10935), CS (MCC 10935), CD (MCD 10935); Remaster Vinyl (MCA 10935), CD (MCA 10935) 2018	42	–	–	–
Both Sides (with the Scottish Chamber Orchestra)	Released: 2000; Label: Randan; Formats: CD (RANHCDA01)	–	47	35	–
Hindsight... It's A Wonderful Thing	Released: 2001; Label: Randan; Formats: CD (RANHCDA02)	–	71	–	–
Only All of Me	Released: 2003; Label: Randan; Formats: CD (RANHCDA 03)	–	–	–	–
Coveted	Released: 2004; Label: Randan; Formats: CD (RANHCDA04)	–	–	–	–
Red Haired Girl	Released: 2007; Label: Kosmic Music; Formats: CD (RANHCDA05)	–	–	–	–
Coming Up for Air	Released: 2009; Label: Randan; Formats: CD (RANHCDA06)	–	–	–	–
Home	Released: 5 August 2013; Label: Randan; Formats: CD (RANHCDA07)	–	–	–	–
The Road Less Travelled	Released: 25 May 2024; Label: Randan Records; Formats: LP (RANHVIN02), CD	–	–	–	47

=== Compilation albums ===
Title	Album details
Odds And Sods: Compilation For The Wee Small Hours	Released: 2015; Label: Randan; Formats: CD (RANHCDCOMP 01)

=== Singles ===
Year	Single	Peak positions		Album
Year	Single	UK	GER	Album
1989	"You Could Be Forgiven"	76	—	The Same Sky
1990	"The Speed of the Beat of My Heart"	81	—	The Same Sky
1990	"Sweet Thing"	96	58	The Same Sky
1990	"Careful"	52	—	The Same Sky
1993	"Shake This Mountain"	52	—	God's Home Movie
1993	"God's Home Movie"	56	—	God's Home Movie
1994	"Celebrate"	49	—	God's Home Movie
1997	"Careful ('97 Remixes)"	44	—	single only
"—" denotes releases that did not chart or were not released.

Solo:

- "Sometimes I..." (1999)
- "Same Old, Same Old" (2006)
- "Something Wicked This Way Comes" (Randan, 1 Jan 2010)
- "Soldier of Love" (Randan, 9 Nov 2012)
- "I Am" (Randan, 1 Jul 2013) Rocket Science Remix
- "Bring Him Home" (Randan, 21 Dec 2016)
- "Leaving" (Randan, 7 Mar 2022)
