= Till I Loved You (song) =

Song by Maury Yeston

Single by Plácido Domingo and Jennifer Rush

from the album Goya: A Life in Song
- B-side: "Overture / Espana"
- Released: April 24, 1989
- Genre: Pop
- Length: 4:20
- Label: CBS
- Songwriter: Maury Yeston
- Producer: Phil Ramone

"Till I Loved You" is a song from the never-staged musical Goya: A Life in Song, based on the life of the Spanish artist Francisco Goya. It was written by American composer Maury Yeston.

The original was sung by Spanish opera singer Plácido Domingo and American singer Dionne Warwick. It was subsequently released as a single by Domingo with another collaborator to the album, Jennifer Rush. The song reached number 24 on the UK Charts in 1989, and was featured on the concept album of the musical. The version with Jennifer Rush was praised by the pan-European magazine Music & Media as a "lush, old-fashioned duet that sounds like opera".

It was covered (although released before the concept album) as a duet by Barbra Streisand and Don Johnson, and appeared on Streisand's Platinum-selling 1988 album of the same name, and later on her 2002 compilation, Duets. As a single, it reached number 16 in the United Kingdom, number 25 in the United States and number 22 on the Spain Top 40 Radio chart. It also reached number 3 on Billboard's Adult Contemporary survey.

Domingo also recorded a Spanish-language single of the song with Gloria Estefan titled "Hasta amarte" and a Portuguese version, "Apaixonou", with Simone Bittencourt de Oliveira. "Hasta amarte" peaked at number 8 on Billboard's Hot Latin Songs chart.

== Track listings ==
=== Barbra Streisand and Don Johnson version ===
- 7-inch single (United States, Australia, Canada, Europe and United Kingdom) / Cassette single (United States) / 3-inch CD single (United States)
1. "Till I Loved You" (The Love Theme from Goya) – 4:48
2. "Two People" (Theme From Motion Picture Nuts) – 3:37
- 7-inch extended play (United Kingdom)
1. "Till I Loved You" (The Love Theme from Goya) – 4:48
2. "Two People" (Theme From Motion Picture Nuts) – 3:37
3. "You Don't Bring Me Flowers" (Duet with Neil Diamond) – 3:14
4. "What Kind of Fool" (Duet with Barry Gibb) – 4:04
- 12-inch maxi-single (Europe and United Kingdom)
1. "Till I Loved You" (The Love Theme from Goya) – 4:48
2. "Guilty (Duet with Barry Gibb) – 4:50
3. "Two People" (Theme From Motion Picture Nuts) – 3:37
- CD maxi-single (United Kingdom)
1. "Till I Loved You" (The Love Theme from Goya) – 4:48
2. "Guilty (Duet with Barry Gibb) – 4:50
3. "Left in the Dark" – 7:04
4. "Two People" (Theme From Motion Picture Nuts) – 3:37

=== Placido Domingo and Jennifer Rush version ===
- 7-inch single (Australia, Europe and United Kingdom) / Cassette single (Australia and United Kingdom)
1. "Till I Loved You" – 4:20
2. "Overture / Espana" – 4:22
- 12-inch maxi-single (Europe) / 3-inch CD maxi-single (Europe)
1. "Till I Loved You" – 4:20
2. "The Astounding Romantic Adventures Of Goya / In The Middle Of The 18th Century" – 5:34
- 12-inch maxi-single (United Kingdom) / CD maxi-single (United Kingdom)
1. "Till I Loved You" – 4:20
2. "Overture / Espana" – 4:22
3. "Viva Espana" (Dance Mix) – 5:45

== Charts ==
Weekly chart performance for "Till I Loved You" by Barbra Streisand and Don Johnson
Chart (1988–1989)	Peak position
Australia (ARIA)	34
Belgium (Ultratop 50 Flanders)	3
Eurochart Hot 100 Singles (Music & Media)	78
France (SNEP)	22
Germany (GfK)	26
Ireland (IRMA)	9
Italy Airplay (Music & Media)	6
Netherlands (Dutch Top 40)	4
Netherlands (Single Top 100)	4
UK Singles (Official Charts)	16
Uruguay (UPI)	9
US Billboard Hot 100	25
US Adult Contemporary (Billboard)	3

Weekly chart performance for "Till I Loved You" by Placido Domingo and Jennifer Rush
Chart (1989)	Peak position
Eurochart Hot 100 Singles (Music & Media)	49
Italy Airplay (Music & Media)	20
UK Singles (Official Charts)	24
