= Alan Barton =

British singer (1953–1995)

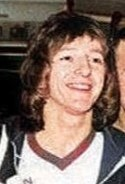
- Barton in 1979

Background information
- Born: 16 September 1953; Barnsley, Yorkshire, England
- Died: 23 March 1995 (aged 41) Cologne, Germany
- Genres: Rock, pop
- Occupations: Singer
- Instruments: Vocals, guitar
- Years active: 1969–1995
- Formerly of: Black Lace, Smokie

Alan Leslie Barton (16 September 1953 – 23 March 1995) was a British singer and member of the bands Black Lace and Smokie.

== Career ==
Born in Barnsley, Yorkshire, Barton was an original member of Black Lace, who represented the United Kingdom in the Eurovision Song Contest 1979 with seventh-place finisher "Mary Ann" in Jerusalem. Black Lace went on to have hits during the 1980s with "Superman", "Agadoo" and "Do the Conga". In 1986, Barton replaced Chris Norman in Smokie, initially doing double duty with them and Black Lace, before leaving the latter in 1987. He recorded six albums with Smokie, and touring extensively as their lead vocalist and rhythm guitarist. He was the lead singer on Smokie's revival of their hit "Living Next Door to Alice", recorded with comedian Roy 'Chubby' Brown, as "Living Next Door to Alice (Who the F**k Is Alice)". In the early 1990s, he released his only solo album, Precious (1991), and two accompanying singles: "July 69" (1990) and "Carry Your Heart" (with Kristine Pettersen) (1991).

Barton died in March 1995, at the age of 41, from injuries incurred when Smokie's tour bus crashed during a hailstorm in Cologne, Germany.

He is buried at Liversedge cemetery, West Yorkshire.

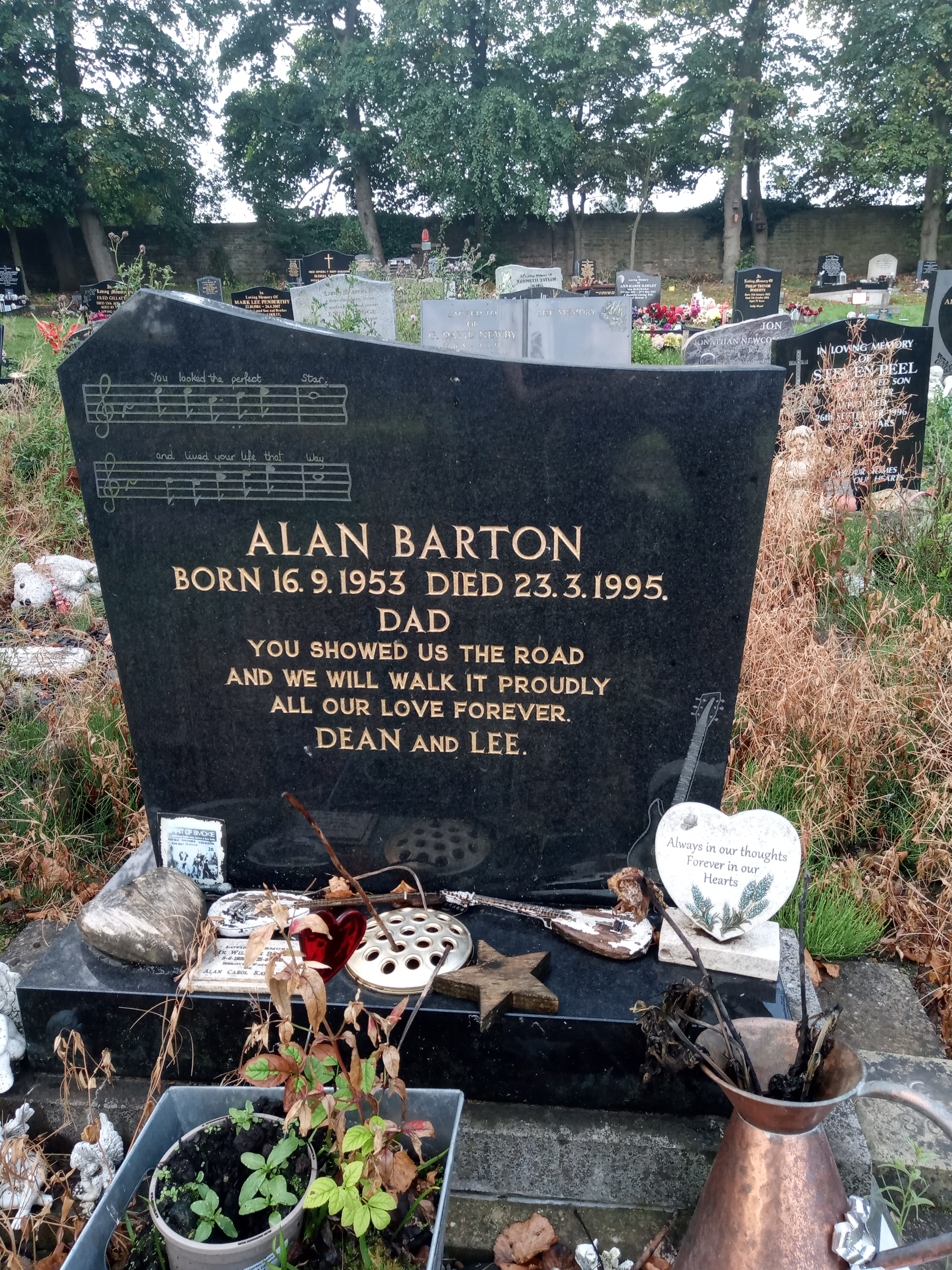
