= Heart over Mind (Jennifer Rush album) =

Studio album by Jennifer Rush
- Released: February 13, 1987
- Genres: Dance-rock, pop rock
- Length: 42:11
- Label: CBS
- Producers: Harold Faltermeyer, Andy Goldmark, Bruce Roberts, Desmond Child, Gus Dudgeon

Jennifer Rush chronology
Movin' (1985)	Heart over Mind (1987)	Passion (1988)

Singles from Heart over Mind
- 1. "I Come Undone" Released: February 1987; 2. "Flames of Paradise" Released: June 1987; 3. "Heart over Mind" Released: September 1987

Heart over Mind is the third studio album by American singer Jennifer Rush. It was released in 1987.

== Background ==
With her first two albums being recorded in Germany and Rush experiencing much success in Europe, she decided to relocate to the US for her next album. Working with writers and producers such as Harold Faltermeyer and Michael Bolton, this album would go on to be one of the most successful of Rush's career.

Released in early 1987, the first single was the European hit "I Come Undone". However it was the second single release which the record company were more excited about – "Flames of Paradise", a duet with Elton John. The song became Rush's first top 40 success in the US as well as a hit in Europe, although smaller than expected in the UK, after predictions of it reaching number one by both Smash Hits and Number One Magazines. The album itself boasted a host of power ballads and uptempo pop/rock tunes with high production values and went on to reach number one in Germany for 9 weeks, remaining on the chart for over a year. It also reached number one in Switzerland. In the US the album peaked at number 118 and number 48 in the UK. A third single "Heart Over Mind" duly became another hit in Europe and also hit the US Club Chart, peaking at No.33.

== Reception ==
The pan-European magazine Music & Media named Heart Over Mind one of its "albums of the week" in the issue dated March 7, 1987. The magazine praised Jennifer's "powerful, confident and melodramatic" vocals and noted the album was suited for "the adult, Mainstream American market" with its "calculated balance between powerful rock songs and gentle, swaying ballads". The songs "Down to You", "Heart Wars", "Flames of Paradise" and "Love of a Stranger" were all recommended tracks, with the last being "the best single candidate off the album". The magazine summed up the album as a "very mature, polished and balanced set".

== Track listing ==
Writers in the 'Music' column are the same as those in the 'Lyrics' column unless otherwise stated.

Heart over Mind track listing
No.	Title	Lyrics	Music	Producer	Length
1.	"I Come Undone"	Ellen Shipley; Morrie Brown		Desmond Child	4:06
2.	"Down to You"	Jennifer Rush; Child		Child	4:30
3.	"Heart over Mind"	Taylor Rhodes; Tom Deluca		Harold Faltermeyer	4:10
4.	"Search the Sky"	Rush; Tom Whitlock	Faltermeyer	Faltermeyer	4:39
5.	"Flames of Paradise" (Duet with Elton John)	Bruce Roberts; Andy Goldmark		Roberts; Goldmark	4:42
6.	"Love of a Stranger"	Rush; Whitlock	Faltermeyer	Faltermeyer	4:02
7.	"Heart Wars"	Child; Rick Nowels		Child	3:17
8.	"Stronghold"	Roberts; Goldmark		Roberts; Goldmark	4:23
9.	"Sidekick"	Roberts; Goldmark		Roberts; Goldmark	4:09
10.	"Call My Name"	Michael Bolton; Mark Radice; Rush	Bolton; Radice	Gus Dudgeon	4:13
Total length:					42:11

== Personnel ==
- Guitars: Richie Sambora (1), John Putnum (2, 7), Dann Huff (3–4, 6), J.J. Belle (5), Paul Jackson (5, 9), Jim Ryan (8), Tim Renwick (10)
- Keyboards: Robbie Kondor (1–2), Al Greenwood (1–2), Harold Faltermeyer (3–4, 6), Greg Phillinganes (5), Robbie Kilgore (5, 9), Greg Mangafico (7), Charlie Roth (7), Richard Cottle (10)
- Bass: John Seigle (1), Seth Glassman (2, 7), Nathan East (5), Leland Sklar (8), Richard Cottle (10)
- Drums: Michael Braun (1–2), John Robinson (5, 8–9), Anton Fig (7), Russ Kunkel (8), Jimmy Bralower (8), Graham Broad (10)
- Percussion: Savron Hudson (1–2), Jimmy Maelen (5, 8), Anton Fig (7)
- Saxophone: Bobby Stern (2), Richard Cottle (10)
- Background vocals: Jennifer Rush (1–3, 5–6, 8, 10), Diana Grasselli (1–2), Ellen Shipley (1–2), Myriam Valle (1–2), Desmond Child (2), David Dale (2), Siedah Garrett (3, 6), Edie Lehmann (3, 6), Beth Anderson (3, 6), Joe Pizzulo (3, 6), Darryl Phinnessee (3, 6), Jon Joyce (3, 6), Elton John (5), Gordon Grody (5), Bruce Roberts (5, 8–9), Andy Goldmark (9), Alan Carvell (10), Andy Brown (10), Anne Turner (10)

== Heart over Mind – The Concerts '87 ==
Jennifer embarked on a tour to coincide with the release of Heart over Mind. Tour dates are listed below:

Date	City	Country	Venue
22 October 1987	Würzburg	Germany	Carl Diem Halle
23 October 1987	Würzburg	Germany	Carl Diem Halle
24 October 1987	Bremen	Germany	Stadthalle
26 October 1987	Hamburg	Germany	Congress Center Hamburg
27 October 1987	Hamburg	Germany	Congress Center Hamburg
28 October 1987	Hamburg	Germany	Congress Center Hamburg
29 October 1987	Hamburg	Germany	Congress Center Hamburg
31 October 1987	Hanover	Germany	Sporthalle
1 November 1987	Hanover	Germany	Sporthalle
2 November 1987	Frankfurt	Germany	Festhalle Frankfurt
4 November 1987	Stuttgart	Germany	Schleyerhalle
5 November 1987	Zurich	Switzerland	
7 November 1987	Frankfurt	Germany	Festhalle Frankfurt
8 November 1987	Cologne	Germany	Sporthalle
11 November 1987	Berlin	Germany	Deutschlandhalle
12 November 1987	Essen	Germany	Grugahalle
13 November 1987	Essen	Germany	Grugahalle
15 November 1987	Kassel	Germany	Nordhessen Arena
16 November 1987	Kassel	Germany	Nordhessen Arena
17 November 1987	Kiel	Germany	Ostseehalle
20 November 1987	Stockholm	Sweden	
21 November 1987	Gothenburg	Sweden	
22 November 1987	Lund	Sweden	
24 November 1987	Nuremberg	Germany	Frankenhalle
26 November 1987	Munich	Germany	Olympiahalle
27 November 1987	Vienna	Austria	
28 November 1987	Vienna	Austria	
1 December 1987	Ludwigshafen	Germany	Eberthalle
2 December 1987	Ludwigshafen	Germany	Eberthalle
3 December 1987	Augsburg	Germany	Sporthalle Augsburg
5 December 1987	Friedrichshafen	Germany	IBO Messehalle
6 December 1987	Karlsruhe	Germany	Schwarzwaldhalle
7 December 1987	Karlsruhe	Germany	Schwarzwaldhalle
9 December 1987	Saarbrücken	Germany	Saarlandhalle
11 December 1987	Saarbrücken	Germany	Saarlandhalle
15 December 1987	Berlin	Germany	ICC Berlin
17 December 1987	Stuttgart	Germany	Schleyerhalle
19 December 1987	Frankfurt	Germany	Jahrhunderthalle
20 December 1987	Frankfurt	Germany	Jahrhunderthalle

== Charts ==
=== Weekly charts ===
Weekly chart performance for Heart over Mind
Chart (1987)	Peak position
Austrian Albums (Ö3 Austria)	9
Canada Top Albums/CDs (RPM)	33
European Albums (Music & Media)	18
Finnish Albums (Suomen virallinen lista)	7
German Albums (Offizielle Top 100)	1
Norwegian Albums (VG-lista)	6
Swedish Albums (Sverigetopplistan)	4
Swiss Albums (Schweizer Hitparade)	1
UK Albums (Official Charts)	48
US Billboard 200	118

=== Year-end charts ===
Year-end chart performance for Heart over Mind
Chart (1987)	Position
Austrian Albums (Ö3 Austria)	20
European Albums (Music & Media)	24
German Albums (Offizielle Top 100)	2
Swiss Albums (Schweizer Hitparade)	2

== Certifications ==
Certifications for Heart over Mind
Region	Certification	Certified units/sales
Canada (Music Canada)	Gold	50,000^{^}
Germany (BVMI)	2× Platinum	1,000,000^{^}
Sweden (GLF)	Platinum	100,000^{^}
Switzerland (IFPI Switzerland)	Platinum	50,000^{^}
^{^} Shipments figures based on certification alone.

== Release history ==
Region	Date	Label	Format(s)	Cat. No.	Ref.
United Kingdom	6 April 1987	CBS	LP; Cassette; CD	450470-1; 450470-4; 450470-2	
Europe	May 1987	CBS	CD		
