= L'Italiano =

Single by Toto Cutugno

from the album L'italiano
- Released: 1983
- Recorded: 1983
- Genre: Pop
- Composer: Toto Cutugno
- Lyricist: Cristiano Minellono

Music video
- "L'Italiano" on YouTube

"L'Italiano" (Italian pronunciation: [litaˈljaːno]; "The Italian") is a pop song by Italian singer Toto Cutugno, released in 1983. It was his biggest international hit and is his best-known composition. Its popularity declined during the 1990s and it was re-discovered when Cutugno performed it live at a charity concert in Rome commemorating Italy's victory at the 2006 FIFA World Cup, creating a new wave of popularity for the song.

== Background ==
Cutugno composed the song following a concert in Toronto, which inspired him to write a song dedicated to Italian emigrants. The lyrics were written by his close collaborator at the time Cristiano Minellono, who got the initial inspiration for the song from the title of a Canale 5 program, Buongiorno Italia.

Initially titled "Con quegli occhi di italiano" ('With those Italian eyes'), the song was originally intended for Adriano Celentano, who turned it down. Cutugno then thought of having the popular impersonator Gigi Sabani sing it in a Celentano impersonation, but when Sanremo Music Festival organizer Gianni Ravera listened to it, he convinced Cutugno to perform it in his own style. "L'Italiano" entered the competition at the 33rd edition of the festival, ranking fifth. It eventually won the side competition "Cantanti e vincenti", and placed second in the critics' award classification, behind Matia Bazar's "Vacanze romane" and preceding Amedeo Minghi's "1950".

== Album release ==
Following its Sanremo Music Festival debut in 1983, "L’Italiano" was issued as the lead single and title track of Toto Cutugno’s album L’italiano, released by Carosello Records.

The LP combined the new hit with earlier singles such as "Solo noi" and "Donna donna mia". Contemporary Italian press described the record as reflecting early-1980s optimism and national sentiment.

The album has since been reissued on cassette, CD and digital formats, and remains among Cutugno’s most recognisable releases.

== Recordings ==
In 1983, Finnish singer Kari Tapio recorded a cover titled "Olen suomalainen" ("I am a Finn"), which became a hit in Finland. Also, a Dutch version titled "Als ik maar bij jou ben" ("As long as I'm with you") was a moderate hit for palingsound group Canyon from Volendam.

In 1984, Doron Mazar, an Israeli singer and Gassan Abbas, an Israeli-Arabian actor recorded a cover of this song, titled "Ani Hozer HaBayta" ("I am returning home").

The 1980s Czech parody band Triky a pověry (named after Ricchi e Poveri) also made a cover to the song titled Ital nezná ten zázrak ("The Italian doesn't know the miracle"), with the lyrics referring to Czech beer and the national cuisine.

In 1998, the Hungarian band "Happy Gang" made a cover titled "Sokáig voltam távol" ("I've been away for long") on their album "Te+én" ("You+me").

In 1999, this song was copied by Indian music duo Sanjeev-Darshan for the movie "Mann", titled "Nasha Yeh Pyar Ka Nasha Hai". The song was sung by Udit Narayan.

Brazilian singer José Augusto recorded the song in Portuguese as "Faz de Conta".

French singer Hervé Vilard recorded the song in French as "Méditerranéenne".

Vietnamese singer Đàm Vĩnh Hưng recorded his version in Vietnamese as "Say Tình" in 2001.

The Sicilians recorded a cover mixed by Dj Serg featuring Angelo Venuto and released on their album Un amore in 2004. It was played on Top 40 Radio stations as well.

Austrian-Italian singer Patrizio Buanne recorded his version on the album "The Italian" in 2005.

In 2011, the song was released on the famous party band The Gypsy Queens eponymous album The Gypsy Queens. The song became a successful cover for the band when they released a video clip of the song (produced by Didier Casnati) featuring Italian actress Caterina Murino, and reached several million views on YouTube in only a couple of weeks.

In 2013, the song was covered in Arabic by Lara Scandar, titled Taalou Ghannou Maaya (Arabic: تعالوا غنوا معايا, Come Sing With Me).Later, in 2014, the song was covered in Turkish by Tuğba Özerk, titled Derin Darbe.

In 2021, the couple Jonathan Cilia Faro and Annalisa Minetti recorded a cover of the song for the compilation Pro Latino 146 (DMC, DMCPL146).

== Charts ==
Chart (1983)	Peak position
Belgium (Ultratop 50 Flanders)	11
France (IFOP)	1
Italy (Musica e dischi)	2
Portugal (AFP)	1
Switzerland (Schweizer Hitparade)	1
West Germany (GfK)	23

Chart (2023)	Peak position
Switzerland (Schweizer Hitparade)	67

== Certifications ==
Region	Certification	Certified units/sales
Italy (FIMI) Since 2009	Gold	50,000^{‡}
^{‡} Sales+streaming figures based on certification alone.
