= Gypsy Queen =

Gypsy Queen may refer to:

== Music ==
- The Gypsy Queens, a French pop band
  - The Gypsy Queens (album), 2012

=== Songs ===
- "Gypsy Queen", a song from the 1966 album Spellbinder by Gábor Szabó
- "Gypsy Queen", a 1972 song by Greg Quill and Kerryn Tolhurst
- "Gypsy Queen", songs from the 1970 album Gypsy by Gypsy
- "Gypsy Queen", a song from the 1970 album His Band and the Street Choir by Van Morrison
- "Gypsy Queen", a song from the 1977 album Rock City by Riot
- "Gypsy Queen" (song), a 1986 song by Akina Nakamori

== Other uses ==
- A female Gypsy King (or King of the Gypsies)
- The Gypsy Queen, a 1913 American short comedy silent film
- Gypsy Queen, a brand of tobacco made by Goodwin & Company
- de Havilland Gipsy Queen, an aircraft piston engine
- Narcissus 'Gipsy Queen', a daffodil cultivar

== See also ==
- Queen of the Gypsies (disambiguation)
