= Guaglione =

1956 Neapolitan song

Original sheet music cover image

"Guaglione" (pronounced [waʝˈʝoːnə]) is a Neapolitan song with music by Giuseppe Fanciulli and words by Nicola "Nisa" Salerno. This original version of the song was the winning song at the IV Festival di Napoli which was broadcast on radio in 1956. Guaglione is Neapolitan for "boy", but as slang can mean "street urchin", "corner boy", etc. The word guaglione has appeared as wallyo in New York immigrant slang.

The song has been covered by various artists, including Italian bandleader Renzo Arbore, and Italian singers Claudio Villa, Aurelio Fierro, Renato Carosone and Dalida, who had her breakthrough with the release of the French-language version "Bambino". Under the title "The Man Who Plays the Mandolino", with a lyric in English, Dean Martin sang it in 1956 after Fred Raphael of Walt Disney Music Company obtained for Disney the U.S. publishing rights. The English lyrics were inspired by a little known Italian singer-songwriter a mandolino player Luca Belvedere. Connie Francis recorded the song in the original Italian language for her 1960 album More Italian Favorites.

The best-known version of "Guaglione" was recorded by the Cuban bandleader Perez Prado in 1958 as an uptempo mambo tune. As a mambo, the track rose to fame in 1994 and 1995 after it was used for the Guinness advert "Anticipation", which led to the song being released as a single, reaching number one in Ireland and number two in the United Kingdom. It has since been featured as the intro music for the 1996 video game Kingdom O' Magic, and more recently as the opening music for the television show Jimmy's Farm. The song is one of Disney's biggest profit makers. Marino Marini's version was featured in the film The Talented Mr. Ripley. Two versions based on the Dean Martin rendition were featured in Hindi films - "Lahron Pe Lahar" in the 1960 film Chhabili and "Yeh Kaali Kaali Aankhen" in the 1993 film Baazigar. In 2006 Patrizio Buanne recorded an English version, with lyrics by Steve Crosby, titled Bella bella signorina for his album Forever Begins Tonight.

== 1994 and 1995 release ==
As a mambo, "Guaglione" rose to fame in 1994 and 1995 after it was used for the Guinness advert "Anticipation", which led to the song being released as a single, reaching number one in Ireland and number two in the United Kingdom. The advert first aired in Ireland in 1994, giving way for "Guaglione" to top the Irish Singles Chart. At the same time, another Guinness advert titled "Recursive" began airing in the UK, this one using Louis Armstrong's "We Have All the Time in the World" as a soundtrack. The rights to release the song as a single were difficult to obtain, and by the time the track was cleared for release, "Anticipation" had begun airing in the UK, leading to a concurrent release of "Guaglione" and "We Have All the Time in the World". Demand for the latter song was higher, so Guinness replaced "Anticipation" with "Recursive" on television and abandoned their promotion of "Guaglione", leading it to chart on import copies only. In early 1995, "Anticipation" began airing in the UK properly, allowing for a re-release of "Guaglione".

=== Critical reception ===
Pan-European magazine Music & Media wrote, "Fuelled by a TV ad for Guinness, the King of mambo reclaims his throne. Guaglione takes you back to the days when organists played in cinemas during the intervals."

=== Charts ===
==== Weekly charts ====
Chart (1994–1995)	Peak position
Europe (Eurochart Hot 100)	8
Ireland (IRMA)	1
Scotland Singles (Official Charts)	2
UK Singles (Official Charts)	2
UK Airplay (Music Week)	15

==== Year-end charts ====
Chart (1995)	Position
UK Singles (OCC)	21

=== Certifications ===
Region	Certification	Certified units/sales
United Kingdom (BPI)	Gold	400,000^{^}
^{^} Shipments figures based on certification alone.

=== Release history ===
Region	Date	Format(s)	Label(s)	Ref.
Ireland	1994	CD; cassette	RCA; BMG Ireland	
United Kingdom	28 November 1994	CD; cassette	RCA; BMG	
United Kingdom	24 April 1995	7-inch vinyl; CD; cassette	RCA; BMG	
