= Tu vuò fà l'americano =

Song by Renato Carosone
- Language: Neapolitan
- Released: 1956
- Recorded: 1956
- Genre: Italian pop; swing; jazz
- Length: 3:25
- Composer: Renato Carosone
- Lyricist: Nicola Salerno

Official audio
- "Tu vuò fà l'americano" on YouTube

"Tu vuò fà l'americano" (pronounced [ˈtu vwo ˈfa lameriˈkɑːnə]; "You Want to Play American") is a Neapolitan language song by Italian singer Renato Carosone.

Carosone wrote the song in collaboration with Nicola "Nisa" Salerno in 1956. Combining swing and jazz, it became one of his best-known songs. Commissioned by Ricordi director Rapetti for a radio contest, the music was composed by Carosone in a very short time after reading Nisa's lyrics; he immediately believed the song would become a great success.

Carosone performed the original version of the song in the film Totò, Peppino e le fanatiche (directed by Mario Mattoli, 1958). The song was featured in the 1960 Melville Shavelson film It Started in Naples, in which it was sung by Sophia Loren acting opposite Paolo Carlini. It was also performed by Rosario Fiorello in the 1999 film The Talented Mr. Ripley.

The lyrics are about an Italian who affects a contemporary American lifestyle, drinking whisky and soda, dancing to rock 'n roll, playing baseball and smoking Camel cigarettes, but who still depends on his parents for money. The song is generally considered to be a satire of the Americanization that occurred in the early years after World War II, when southern Italy was still a largely rural, traditional society. According to the Italian newspaper la Repubblica, "Tu vuò fa l'americano" is the definitive hit single of Carosone's artistic career, as he retired from music in 1960, just four years after releasing the song.

== Covers and sampling ==
- The Lucky Duckies from Portugal recorded this on their album Glamour and Nostalgia - Part two in 2012. One of the most successful versions on Youtube. There are more than 15 million views from all over the world. They recorded it live in 2022 live concert ao Coliseu de Lisboa (Lisbon Coliseum) celebrating the 35th Anniversary of the band.
- Boris Vian adapted it in French under the name "Tout fonctionne à l'italiano" ("Everything goes italiano") to parodize the era's French craving for Italian things. The song was created in 1957 by Freddy Balta on its humoristic EP Fredo Minablo et sa pizza musicale (Fredo Minablo and its musical pizza).
- Lou Bega made a cover of the song entitled "You Wanna Be Americano".
- The Brian Setzer Orchestra covered this song with their song, "Americano". This song appeared on their album Vavoom!.
- The song was covered by the Gisella Cozzo and Ray Gelato Giants in 1998, with their version of the track used for a worldwide television commercial for Levi's. It had a wide exposure and appeared on two of their albums, The Men from Uncle (1998), and Live in Italy (2000).
- The song was sampled in 2010 by the Australian duo Yolanda Be Cool and producer DCUP in their song "We No Speak Americano" that became an international hit. It was subsequently re-recorded by Marco Calliari.
- Don Omar – "We No Speak Americano (Remix)"
- This was used as one of the demo songs for the singing synthesizer software Vocaloid Tonio and featured both him and another Vocaloid "Big Al" singing the song.
- The Puppini Sisters recorded this on their album Betcha Bottom Dollar in 2007.
- Pitbull (2010) – "Bon Bon (We No Speak Americano)", sample.
- In 2002 the Chilean rock band Pettinellis recorded a cover entitled "Americano" as part of their debut album.
- Rita Chiarelli released this song on her album Italian Sessions.
- Korean band LPG made an adaptation to their track Angry.
- Darren Criss covered the song at a charity show at Yale University in 2011, and on his 2013 "Listen Up" tour in Huntington, NY.
- A half-Greek, half-Italian version was recorded in 2011 by Lavrentis Machairitsas and Tonino Carotone.
- In 2012 the band The Gypsy Queens features this song in their album The Gypsy Queens, with the title L'Americano. Mark Francis "Made In Chelsea" 2012.
- Dany Brillant recorded the song in Neapolitan language and released his cover version on his album "Dolce Vita" in 2001.
- Patrizio Buanne's rendition of the song with lyrics in English was released on his album Patrizio in 2009 with the name "Americano (Tu vuo' fa l'americano)".
- Gigi D'Alessio released a cover of the song with Christian De Sica on his third live album "Tu Vuo' Fa L'Americano - Live In New York" in 2011.
- Dominic Halpin & The Honey B's covered the song as "Americano" on their 2016 album Cha Cha Boom.

== Uses in popular culture ==
- Matt Damon, Jude Law and Rosario Fiorello sing the song in a jazz club in The Talented Mr. Ripley. In an ironic subversion of the song's subject matter, Law's character is an American heir living in the fictional town of Mongibello, Italy, where he revels in Italian culture while living off a generous allowance from his wealthy American parents back home.
- Carosone's version appears in the soundtrack for the 2010 film The American. In the movie, the song plays in a café visited by George Clooney's character, an American assassin seeking refuge in a small Italian town.
- The same version is part of the soundtrack for the 2012 animated movie Sammy's Great Escape.
- The song can be heard in episode 4 of the miniseries Catch-22 during a sequence in which Yossarian helps Milo with his business ventures throughout the Mediterranean (although the song was written after the timeframe of this series).
- The song is heard in the 2021 film The Hitman's Wife's Bodyguard when the three main characters are in Italy.
- The song is heard in the 2022 film Love in the Villa when the protagonist arrives in Italy.

== See also ==
- Music of Naples
- Boogie-woogie
