= Patrizio (album) =

- CD cover of Patrizio

Studio album by Patrizio Buanne
- Released: 8 September 2009
- Genre: Popera
- Language: Italian; English
- Label: WEA International

Patrizio Buanne chronology
Forever Begins Tonight (2006)	Patrizio (2009)	Wunderbar (2012)

Alternative cover
- Australian Special Edition

Patrizio is the third album of Italian baritone Patrizio Buanne. It was released in the United States on 8 September 2009, and in the United Kingdom on 5 April 2010.

While his previous two albums focused on the Italian songbook, his third album was "a much more conventional affair that recalls the contemporary swing-pop output of Michael Bublé".

== Track listing ==
Australian
No.	Title	Writer(s)	Original artist	Length
1.	"On The Street Where You Live"	Frederick Loewe; Alan Jay Lerner	Vic Damone	4:06
2.	"Crazy"	Willie Nelson	Patsy Cline	4:32
3.	"Have You Ever Really Loved a Woman?"	Bryan Adams; Michael Kamen; Robert John "Mutt" Lange	Bryan Adams	4:47
4.	"Mambo Italiano"	Bob Merrill	Rosemary Clooney	3:16
5.	"Make Love (Amore-Sempre con te)"	Joe Cang; Matteo Saggese		3:14
6.	"Grande, grande, grande-Never, Never, Never"	Alberto Testa; Norman Newell; Tony Renis	Mina * Shirley Bassey	4:17
7.	"Fly Me To The Moon"	Bart Howard	Kaye Ballard; Frank Sinatra	4:35
8.	"I Can't Say No"	Howard; Kaye; Parks; Vetesse		3:41
9.	"Maybe This Summer (Estate)"	Brighetti; Martino	Peggy Lee	4:12
10.	"Why Did You Have To Be?"	Diane Warren	Debelah Morgan	4:38
11.	"Americano (Tu vuo' fa l'americano)"	Setzer; Himelstein; Salerno; Carosone	Renato Carosone	3:07
12.	"You're My Everything"	de Scarano; Gomes; Donnez	Santa Esmeralda	3:57

UK edition
No.	Title	Writer(s)	Original artist	Length
1.	"First Day of My Life"	Guy Chambers; Enrique Iglesias	Melanie C	3:28
2.	"This Kiss Tonight"			3:27
3.	"Solo Tu (My Baby)"			3:45
4.	"Grande, grande, grande-Never, Never, Never"	Alberto Testa; Norman Newell; Tony Renis	Mina * Shirley Bassey	4:17
5.	"Maybe This Summer (Estate)"	Brighetti; Martino	Peggy Lee	4:12
6.	"Why Did You Have To Be?"	Diane Warren	Debelah Morgan	4:38
7.	"There's Nothing Like This"			4:08
8.	"Crazy"	Willie Nelson	Patsy Cline	4:32
9.	"Fly Me To The Moon"	Bart Howard	Kaye Ballard; Frank Sinatra	4:35
10.	"I Can't Say No"	Howard; Kaye; Parks; Vetesse		3:41
11.	"Have You Ever Really Loved a Woman?"	Bryan Adams; Michael Kamen; Robert John "Mutt" Lange	Bryan Adams	4:47
12.	"You're My Everything"	de Scarano; Gomes; Donnez	Santa Esmeralda	3:57

== Special Edition ==
This album was released in four different versions worldwide. Whereas most of the songs are similar, some songs are not available on all editions, such as On The Street Where You Live, a cover of the Melanie C song First Day of My Life, the songs Solo Tu (My Baby), There's Nothing Like This and the original This Kiss Tonight. All songs are available on the Australian Special Edition though.

== Charts ==
Chart (2009–11)	Peak position
Australian Albums Chart	17
New Zealand Albums Chart	4
US Billboard Jazz Albums	5

== Certifications ==
Region	Certification	Certified units/sales
Australia (ARIA)	Gold	35,000^{^}
^{^} Shipments figures based on certification alone.
