= Didier Casnati =

Italian musician (born 1980)

- Birth name: Didier Casnati
- Also known as: Didi
- Born: 17 June 1980 (age 44); Varese, Italy
- Occupation: Musician
- Instrument(s): Vocals, guitar
- Years active: 1995–present

Didier "Didi" Casnati (born 17 June 1980) is an Italian musician, singer, guitarist, and songwriter, known as the lead singer of pop band, The Gypsy Queens. Casnati also has a past career as an actor and model.

== Biography ==
Casnati was born in Varese, Italy, to an Italian chemist, physicist, bio technologist and his wife. As a young musician, Casnati was inspired by Dire Straits and The Beach Boys.

While attending European School in Varese, he formed several school bands to perform at the schools parties. He recorded his first solo self produced album at age 15.

Casnati wrote, sang and played guitar. At age 18, he moved to Nice to study law, and was funding it by performing in the streets of Nice, and Nice's flower market. He was working as a model and actor at the same time, to pay for his studies. In Nice, he met Nicole Rubi, owner of the restaurant "La petite maison", who made him perform for Elton John, Joe Cocker, Bono among other superstars attending her restaurant. He formed the band The Gypsy Queens, to improve the performances at the restaurant, and being able to perform a wide range of private parties with the band.

=== 2004 Latin America ===
In 2004, he moved to Lima, Peru, to start a solo career. He recorded the song Mal Paso with Eva Ayllon, on Jaime Cuadra's fusion Album Cholo Soy, and won the 7 th Independent Music Award, in the fusion category, the album Cholo Soy went on to be used for the James Bond movie Quantum of Solace, with 3 songs.

=== 2012–2020: Universal ===
In 2012, The Gypsy Queens signed by Nick Raphael to London Records, of the Universal Music Group. The band recorded their debut album The Gypsy Queens, produced by Larry Klein in 2012, and their second album Lost in the music in 2014. The band is known for their all stars private parties performances, and Casnati create a new genre of performing acoustically at dinners.

=== 2020–Present: Singles and Reminiscing with Friends ===
In February 2020, Casnati and The Gypsy Queens recorded 2 singles with record producer Larry Klein at The Village in Los Angeles, I'm into Something Good, featuring Herman's Hermits Peter Noone who originally made the song famous in 1965, and Buona Sera, as part as the Album "Reminiscing with friends" (Sonico Productions Ltd 2022). The cover of the single was photographed by iconic Photographer Marco Glaviano in Saint Barthélemy.

In December 2022, Casnati & Tony Danza co-starred on the recording and music video (released October 13, 2023) of the song "Buona Sera" with cameo appearances from Michele Hicks and Nadia Farès as well as Joe Gannascoli, as the second single release for The Gypsy Queens Album "Reminiscing with friends". The video clip narrative was written by John Patrick Shanley, it was shot in New York and Nice. The Video Clip was a huge success achieving over a Million views in just one week.

On November 3, 2023, "Oh Me Oh My (I'm a Fool for You Baby)". a duet between Casnati and Lulu was released as the third single of the album.

== Personal life ==
In 2009 Casnati got engaged to Danish model Thea Christensen (Majors Models), and had a Tahitian wedding ceremony in French Polynesia, on a private island. Neither of them ever legalised their union, and their relation ended in 2011. Casnati has since been seen on different occasions in the company of several celebrities, but their relations were never public, lasting or official, and he has been single since 2015.

== Discography ==
=== Studio albums ===
- The Blue Rose (Music House 1995)
- Mi Mundo (Play Music Peru 2003)
- Cholo Soy 1 (Quadra Sonic, Play Music 2003) Feature on song "Malpaso", with Eva Ayllón
- Latino, Jaime Cuadra (Quadra Sonic, Play Music, 2007) Guest
- The Gypsy Queens (album) (Universal, London Records, 2012)
- Lost in the music (album) (Sonico Productions Ltd, Universal, 2014) Producer and lead singer

=== Singles ===
- L'Americano (Universal Music Group, London Records 2012) With Made in Chelsea
- I'm into Something Good (Sonico Productions Ltd, Universal Music Group, Absolute 2021) With Peter Noone
- Buona Sera Signorina (Sonico Productions Ltd, Universal Music Group 2023) With Tony Danza
- Oh Me Oh My (I'm a Fool for You Baby) (Sonico Productions Ltd, Universal Music Group 2023) With Lulu
