= L'Americano =

L'Americano (Italian for "The American") may refer to:

- L'americano (Piccinni), a 1772 intermezzo by Niccolò Piccinni
- "Tu Vuò Fà L'Americano", a 1956 song performed by Renato Carosone
- "L'Americano" (The Gypsy Queens), a 2012 cover of Carosone's song

== See also ==
- Americano (disambiguation)
