= Elek Bacsik =

Hungarian-American jazz musician

- (undated)

Background information
- Born: 22 May 1926; Budapest, Hungary
- Died: 14 February 1993 (aged 66) Chicago, Illinois, U.S.
- Genres: Jazz
- Occupation: Musician
- Instruments: Guitar, violin
- Years active: 1960s–1970s
- Label: Fontana

Elek Bacsik (22 May 1926 – 14 February 1993) was a Hungarian-American jazz guitarist and violinist. He was the cousin of guitarist Django Reinhardt.

== Career ==
Bacsik was born in Budapest, Hungary. He was the son of Árpád Bacsik and Erzsébet Pócsi.

He studied classical violin at the Budapest Conservatory before moving to jazz guitar. He worked in a big band with Jozsef Quitter and Geza Szabo and recorded for the first time in his career with this band in 1943. A few years later he went on tour in Europe and Lebanon with Mihaly Tabanyi. He was hired by Renato Carosone to be in a quartet with Peter Van Wood and Gegè Di Giacomo in which he played bass, violin, and guitar. When he lived in Paris, he accompanied American musicians who were passing through, such as Lou Bennett, Dizzy Gillespie, Quentin Jackson, Art Simmons, and Clark Terry. He also supported French singer Serge Gainsbourg. In 1966, he moved to the U.S. and until 1974 accompanied Teresa Brewer. In the 1970s he recorded as a leader on violin and electric violin. He played at the Newport Jazz Festival in 1974 and ten years later at the Olympic Games Jazz Festival in Los Angeles.

== Discography ==
=== As leader ===
- The Electric Guitar of the Eclectic Elek Bacsik (Fontana, 1962)
- Guitar Conceptions (Fontana, 1963)
- I Love You (Bob Thiele Music, 1974)
- Bird and Dizzy: A Musical Tribute (Flying Dutchman, 1975)

=== As sideman ===
- Barbara, Barbara Chante Barbara (Philips, 1964)
- Barbara, Au Bois De Saint-Amand (Philips, 1965)
- Lou Bennett, Dansez et Revez (Phono 2017)
- Serge Gainsbourg, Gainsbourg Confidentiel (Philips, 1964)
- Serge Gainsbourg, 1963 Théâtre des Capucines (Mercury, 2001)
- Dizzy Gillespie, Dizzy on the French Riviera (Philips, 1962)
- Dizzy Gillespie, New Wave (Philips, 1963)
- Quincy Jones, $ (Reprise, 1972)
- Jeanne Moreau, Jeanne Moreau No.2 12 Chansons (Jacques Canetti 1967)
- Claude Nougaro, No. 2 (Philips, 1963)

== Bibliography ==
- Balval Ekel: Elek Bacsik - Un homme dans la nuit. La-Neuville—Aux-Joutes. 2015. ISBN 978-2-36336-170-7
- Géza Gábor Simon: Season of the Rain - Elek Bacsik Bio-discography / Esős évszak - Bacsik Elek bio-diszkográfia, Budapest, 2016. ISBN 978-963-12-4707-7

== Sources ==
- Barnett, Anthony. Almost Like Being in Bop: a Not-So-Brief Account of the Hidden History of the Swing to Recorded Bebop and Progressive Violin in America and Europe. Lewes, East Sussex: AB Fable, 2005. More information on his recordings on violin on AB Fable Bulletin : violin improvisation studies
