= Valeria Shashenok =

Ukrainian refugee and photographer (born 2001)

- Born: July 17, 2001 (age 23); Chernihiv, Chernihiv Oblast, Ukraine
- Known for: TikTok videos

Valeriia Shashenok (Ukrainian: Валерія Шашенок; born 17 July 2001) is a Ukrainian photographer who has garnered international attention for her satirical TikTok videos documenting the 2022 invasion of Ukraine.

Shashenok, who is from Chernihiv, Ukraine, worked as a freelance photographer before the war.

== Life during the war ==
From 24 February 2022 until the week of 13 March, Shashenok lived in a bomb shelter where she documented her family's survival techniques, and the destruction of her hometown (which is on the border of Russia and Belarus), in a comedic manner. Meanwhile, her friends fled Ukraine to other countries, including Bulgaria and Italy. Her most prominent video featuring the Sicilian song "C'è la luna mezzo mare", which went viral internationally and accrued over 28 million views. She had previously used TikTok for local businesses and her personal life, but her chronicles of the war started gaining traction when she used English captions. She posted about the war to dispel negative stereotypes about Ukraine and its people, as well as to combat fake news narratives in Russian state media.

In mid-March, she escaped alone to Poland, while her parents stayed in Ukraine. According to her account, she went from Kyiv to Lviv, then from Lviv to Poland's Przemyśl. Although she lacked her passport, she used documents from Ukraine's Diia app and was allowed into the country. From Przemyśl, she traveled to Warsaw via Łódź and was interviewed by a Polish journalist from Telewizja Polska who recognized her at a train stop. During this journey, she was also interviewed by CNN en Español, Cosmopolitan Italia, and la Repubblica.

By August 2022, Shashenok was a refugee in Italy, where she lived with relatives. In September she visited the European Parliament, where she met First Lady of Ukraine Olena Zelenska. In December 2022, her visa application for the United Kingdom was accepted, and she took up residency in London.

== Book ==
In May 2022, Shashenok released a book containing her photographs and describing her experiences with the war. It was first released in German as 24. Februar: Und der Himmel war nicht mehr blau.
