= Lazy Mary =

Lazy Mary may refer to:

- "Lazy Mary (Luna Mezzo Mare)", an Italian-American wedding tarantella
- "Lazy Mary, Will You Get Up", a British nursery rhyme
