= Narcissus 'Gipsy Queen' =

Daffodil cultivar

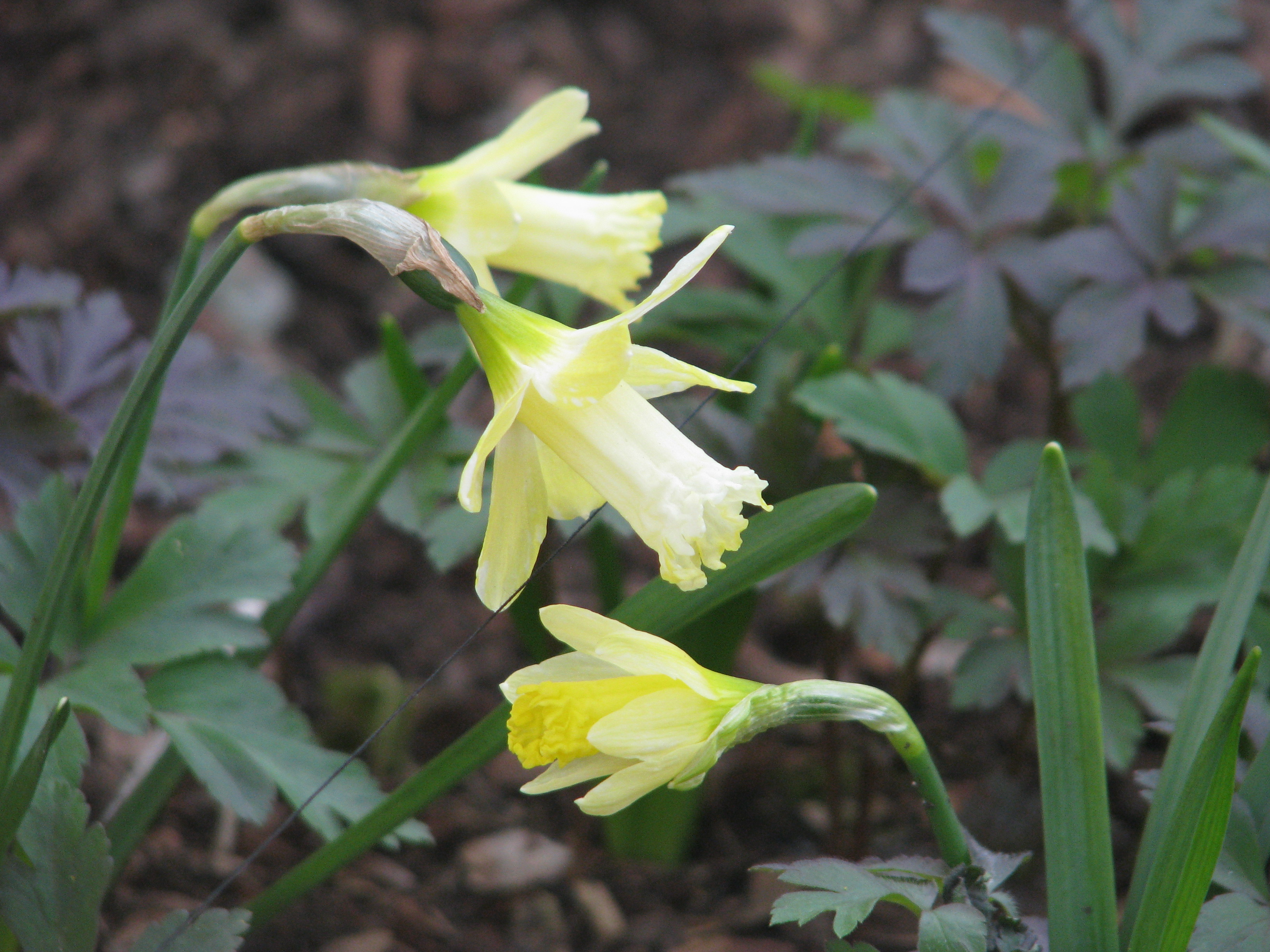
- Genus: Narcissus
- Hybrid parentage: Narcissus minor × Narcissus asturiensis
- Cultivar: 'Gipsy Queen'
- Breeder: Alec Gray (1895-1986)
- Origin: Cornwall, United Kingdom

Narcissus 'Gipsy Queen' is a hybrid cultivar of daffodil, which was registered in 1969. It is one of 110 cultivars produced by British daffodil breeder Alec Gray. This variety was produced by hybridizing Narcissus minor with Narcissus asturiensis.

== Description ==
Narcissus 'Gipsy Queen' is a bulbous, clump forming perennial. It is an early flowering, dwarf cultivar reaching a maximum height of 12cm. Leaves are green and stalks host singular flowers. The flowers once newly emerged start off pale yellow in colour, before fading to white as they mature. Flowers possess a trumpet like corona, which has darker yellow colouring around the tip.
