= Queen of the Gypsies =

Queen of the Gypsies may refer to:

- A female King of the Gypsies

== People ==
- Carmen Amaya (1918–1963), Spanish dancer, singer, and actress
- Věra Bílá (1954–2019), Czech singer
- Kelly Mitchell, Queen of the Gypsy Nation (c. 1868–1915), American leader
- Marie Pollac (?–1931)
- Esma Redžepova (1943–2016), Macedonian singer and humanitarian
- Matilda Stanley (1821?–1878), English horse trader

== Arts and entertainment ==
- The title of Queen Mab in the opera La jolie fille de Perth
- Gypsies Are Found Near Heaven, also known as Queen of the Gypsies, a 1975 Soviet film
- "Queen of the Gypsies", an episode of the television series Kojak

== See also ==
- Gypsy Queen (disambiguation)
