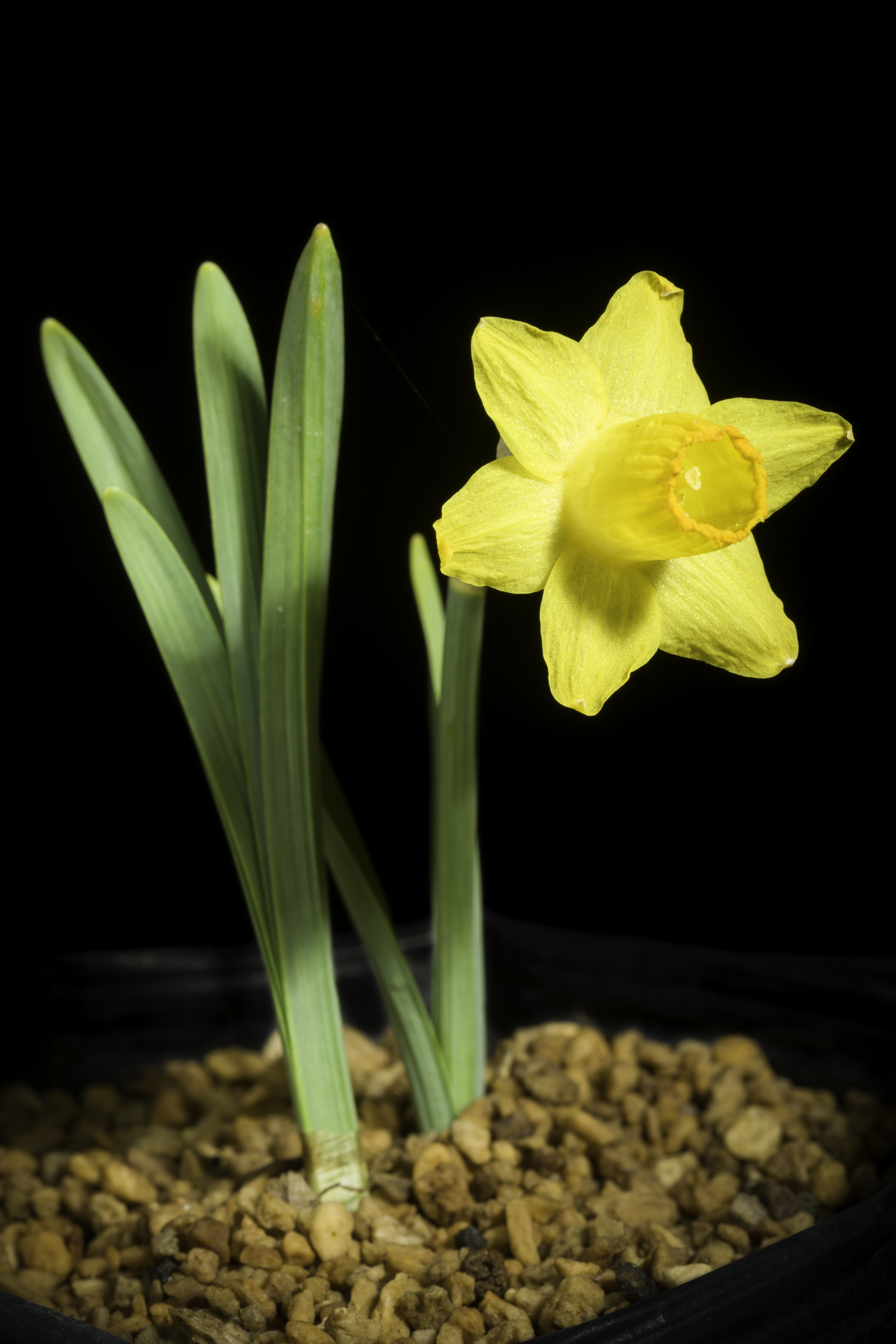
- Narcissus minor 'Little Gem'

Scientific classification
- Kingdom: Plantae
- Clade: Embryophytes
- Clade: Tracheophytes
- Clade: Angiosperms
- Clade: Monocots
- Order: Asparagales
- Family: Amaryllidaceae
- Subfamily: Amaryllidoideae
- Genus: Narcissus
- Species: N. minor

Binomial name
- Narcissus minor L.

Synonyms
- List: Ajax minimus Haw.; Ajax minor (L.) Haw.; Ajax minor var. angustus Haw.; Ajax minor var. conspicuus Haw.; Ajax minor var. medius Haw.; Ajax minor var. minimus Haw.; Ajax nanus Haw.; Ajax parviflorus Jord.; Ajax pumilus Haw.; Ajax pygmaeus M.Roem.; Narcissus asturiensis subsp. brevicoronatus (Pugsley) Uribe-Ech.; Narcissus asturiensis var. brevicoronatus Pugsley; Narcissus exiguus Salisb.; Narcissus hispanicus subsp. provincialis (Pugsley) M.Salmon; Narcissus jacetanus subsp. vasconicus Fern.Casas; Narcissus minor var. brevicoronatus (Pugsley) Barra & G.López; Narcissus parviflorus (Jord.) Pugsley; Narcissus provincialis Pugsley; Narcissus pseudonarcissus subsp. provincialis (Pugsley) J.-M.Tison; Narcissus pumilus Salisb.; Narcissus vasconicus (Fern.Casas) Fern.Casas; Oileus minor (L.) Haw.; Oileus pumilus Haw.

= Narcissus minor =

Species of flowering plant

Narcissus minor, the lesser daffodil or least daffodil, is a species of Narcissus within the family Amaryllidaceae. The species and its cultivar 'Little Gem' have both gained the Royal Horticultural Society's Award of Garden Merit.

== Description ==
Narcissus minor is a bulb plant which sprouts stems 8–25 centimetres (3.1–9.8 in) tall. Flowers are solitary, yellow in colour and grow between 25–40 millimetres (0.98–1.57 in) long. N. minor appears very similar to N. asturiensis; however, N. minor possesses larger stems.

== Distribution and habitat ==
Narcissus minor is native to the Pyrenees mountain range, northern Spain and France, where it can be found growing in alpine habitat such as mountain meadows and in scrub. This species has also been introduced further into Europe where it has successfully naturalized in Austria.
