= Viva la Dolce Vita =

Studio album by Patrizio Buanne
- Released: 17 April 2015
- Genre: Adult contemporary; oldies
- Language: English; Italian; Spanish
- Label: Decca

Patrizio Buanne chronology
| Wunderbar (2012) | Viva la Dolce Vita (2015) | Italianissimo (2018) |

Viva la Dolce Vita is an album by Italian baritone Patrizio Buanne, which was released on 17 April 2015 in Australia. It entered the Australian albums chart the next week at No. 44, later peaking at No. 33 and additionally peaking at No. 1 on the Australian ARIA Classical/Crossover Albums Chart.

The album includes an Italian version of the Charlie Chaplin song "Smile" as well as an English/Italian version of the Elvis Presley song "Surrender", original compositions such as "I Will Love You" and popular Italian songs such as "Gli Occhi Miei".

Buanne promoted the album on several TV shows in Australia, such as The Morning Show, where he performed the song "I Will Love You" and on TVSN, which sold signed copies of the albums via television.

== Track listing ==
| No. | Title | Writer(s) | Original artist | Length |
|---|---|---|---|---|
| 1. | "Surrender (Torna a Surriento)" | Doc Pomus; Mort Shuman | Elvis Presley | 3:41 |
| 2. | "Se mai ti parlassero di me (Smile)" | John Turner; Geoffrey Parsons | Nat King Cole | 2:47 |
| 3. | "Al di là" | Carlo Donida; Mogol; Ervin Drake (English) | Betty Curtis | 3:35 |
| 4. | "Viva la dolce vita" | Matteo Saggese; Joe Cang | | 3:00 |
| 5. | "I Will Love You" | Matteo Saggese; Brendan Graham; Mino Vergnaghi | | 3:55 |
| 6. | "A chi (Hurt)" | Jimmie Crane; Al Jacobs; Mogol | Roy Hamilton | 3:34 |
| 7. | "Quiereme mucho" | Gonzalo Roig; Augustin Rodriguez | Tito Schipa * Mariano Menéndez | 4:14 |
| 8. | "Que sera de mi" (featuring Silva Hakobyan) (Spanish version of the Armenian song "Ov sirun sirun") | Matteo Saggese; Patrizio Buanne; Chris Porter; JC Perezoto | | 3:52 |
| 9. | "...E vui durmiti ancora!" | Giovanni Formisano; Gaetano Emanuel Calì | Gaetano Emanuel Calì | 4:52 |
| 10. | "Dicitencello vuie" | Rodolfo Falvo; Enzo Fusco | Vic Damone | 3:16 |
| 11. | "Gli occhi miei (Help Yourself)" | Carlo Donida; Mogol; Jack Fishman (English) | Tom Jones | 3:17 |
| 12. | "With You (Di sole e d'azzurro)" | Matteo Saggese; Mino Vergnaghi; Zucchero Fornaciari | Giorgia (singer) | 4:19 |
| 13. | "Parlami d'amore Mariù" | Cesare Andrea Bixio; Ennio Neri | Vittorio De Sica | 4:17 |
| 14. | "Bella signorina (With the Ugly Duck)" | Matteo Saggese; Joe Cang | | 2:58 |
| 15. | "Mi amor tan bello" (Spanish version of "I Will Love You"; bonus track) | Matteo Saggese; JC Perezoto; Mino Vergnaghi | | 3:57 |

== Charts ==
| Chart (2015) | Peak position |
|---|---|
| Australian Albums (ARIA) | 33 |
