= Peter Van Wood =

Singer, songwriter, actor, astrologer (1927–2010)

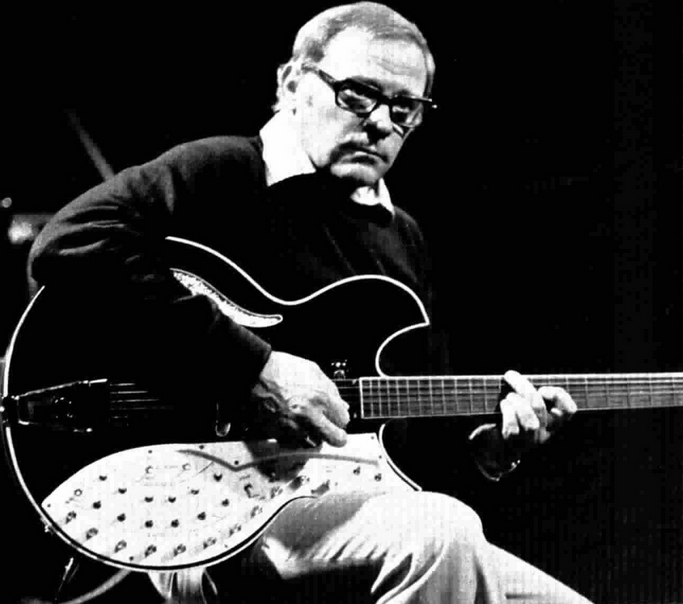

Background information
- Born: Peter van Houten; 19 September 1927; The Hague, Netherlands
- Died: 10 March 2010 (aged 82) Rome, Italy
- Genres: Jazz, rock
- Occupations: Musician, songwriter, astrologer, actor
- Instruments: Vocals, guitar, piano
- Years active: 1946–2010
- Labels: Pathé, Fonit, Philips
- Formerly of: Renato Carosone trio

Peter Van Wood (19 September 1927 – 10 March 2010), was a Dutch-Italian guitarist, singer, songwriter, actor, and astrologer.

== Biography ==
Peter Van Wood was born in 1927 as Pieter van Houten in The Hague. He began playing guitar when he was fourteen years old, and studied at the Royal Conservatory of The Hague. At the same time he started listening to great jazz guitar players and began playing in small groups in and around the Netherlands.

He was among the first to use the electric guitar with special effects such as echo and reverb. In 1946 he performed at the London Palladium and in 1947 and 1948 he toured all over the world, including concerts at the Olympia theatre in Paris and at Carnegie Hall in New York City.

About this time he acquired his signature guitar, a custom Gretsch White Falcon; this was allegedly a personal gift or "endorsement" from Fred Gretsch, and was humorously dubbed by an Italian TV host "the Texan milkman's guitar".

In 1949 he moved to Italy. After a series of concerts and shows in Naples, he was contacted by pianist and singer Renato Carosone, who was asked to put together a group for a club's opening night, and the Trio Carosone, with Gegè Di Giacomo on drums, was formed. The trio recorded several albums for the Pathé record label, and then became a quartet with Hungarian Romani musician Elek Bacsik on bass, guitar, and violin.

In 1954 Van Wood left the Trio Carosone in order to devote himself to his solo career. He relocated to Milan and formed a quartet, which signed for Fonit and released many successful records.

Van Wood's most famous song is "Butta la chiave", which prominently features an apparent "dialogue" between the lyrics he sings and the responses of his "singing" guitar, mimicking the negative responses of a wife who is refusing to let her husband back into their house. It is unclear whether he made use of a rudimentary wah-wah pedal, a "singin' guitar" device like Alvino Rey, or simply a vibrato-bar to achieve that effect, which astonished Italian audiences with its novelty. His other well-known songs include "Via Montenapoleone", a song about one of the most renowned streets of Milan, "Tre numeri al lotto", "Mia cara Carolina" and "Capriccio".

In the 1960s he decided to dedicate himself to astrology and started to contribute horoscopes to Italian newspapers and magazines while continuing to make recordings. He opened the Amsterdam 19 night club in Galleria Passarella in Milan where he often performed as a singer and guitarist.

In 1974 he recorded Guitar Magic an instrumental album for Vedette Phase-6 record label. In 1982 Van Wood recorded the theme song of the Italian television show La Domenica Sportiva. He came again to prominence on Italian television when he took part in the football show Quelli che... il Calcio presented by Fabio Fazio. After this he often appeared as a guest on RAI television shows, discussing astrology.

In October 2007 he sued Coldplay for one million euros, claiming that the song "Clocks" plagiarized his song "Caviar and Champagne".

Peter Van Wood died on 10 March 2010 at the Agostino Gemelli University Policlinic in Rome after a long illness.

== Discography ==
=== With the Trio Carosone ===
| Year | Title | Additional information |
|---|---|---|
| 1951 | "Oh! Susanna" / "Scalinatella" | Released on 11 January by Pathé (MG 13) 78 rpm |
| 1952 | "Oh! Susanna" / "Scalinatella" | Released on January by Pathé (MG 102) 78 rpm |
| 1952 | "Tre numeri al lotto (i pappagalli)" / "Oh! Susanna" | Released by Pathé (MG 157) 78 rpm |

=== Studio albums ===
| Year | Album | Additional information |
|---|---|---|
| 1954 | Van Wood Quartet | Fonit (LP 143) |
| 1955 | L'olandese napoletano | Fonit (LP 146) |
| 1955 | L'olandese volante | Fonit (LP 148) |
| 1956 | Van Wood Quartet | Fonit (LP 170) |
| 1956 | Restiamo in casa stasera con Van Wood | Fonit (LP 180) |
| 1956 | Intorno al mondo con Van Wood | Fonit (LP 181) |
| 1963 | Van Wood | Electrecord (EDD 1085) |
| 1974 | Guitar Magic | Vedette–Phase 6 (VPAS 911) |
| 1981 | Sotto il segno di Van Wood | RCA Linea Tre (NL 33176) |

=== EPs ===
| Year | Album | Additional information |
|---|---|---|
| 1955 | Van Wood Quartet n° 1 | Fonit (EP 4040) |
| 1956 | Van Wood Quartet n° 8 | Fonit (EP 4066) |
| 1956 | Van Wood Quartet n° 9 | Fonit (EP 4067) |
| 1958 | Van Wood Quartet | Fonit (EP 4305) |

=== Singles ===
| Year | Title | Additional information |
|---|---|---|
| 1956 | "Il telefono" / "I Pesciolini" | Fonit (15075) 78 rpm |
| 1956 | "Ciao (Oho-Aha)" / "Baby bu" | Fonit (15191) 78 rpm |
| 1956 | "Mia cara Carolina" / "Fofo' piccolo fofo'" | Fonit (15321) 78 rpm |
| 1956 | "Van Wood's rock" / "Due rane e un cane" | Fonit (15475) 78 rpm |
| 1957 | "Gooi me de sleutel!!! (Butta la chiave)" / "Oh la la" | Fonit (15650) 78 rpm |
| 1958 | "Tipitipitipso" / "Lucia, Luci" | Philips (P 15531 H) 78 rpm |
| 1982 | "Una domenica sportiva" / "Vattene" | Fonit (SP 1784) |

== Filmography ==
| Year | Title | Role | Other notes |
|---|---|---|---|
| 1956 | Cantando sotto le stelle | | Directed by Marino Girolami |
| 1989 | Night Club | Himself | Directed by Sergio Corbucci |

== See also ==
- Renato Carosone

== Bibliography ==
- Zampa, Fabrizio (1990). "Van Wood, Peter". In Castaldo, Gino (ed.). Dizionario della canzone italiana [Dictionary of the Italian song] (in Italian). Arbore, Renzo. Rome, Italy: Armando Curcio Editore. p. 1690.
