= Forever Begins Tonight =

- US cover of Forever Begins Tonight

Studio album by Patrizio Buanne
- Released: 16 October 2006
- Genre: Adult contemporary; popera; oldies
- Language: Italian; English; Spanish
- Label: Next Plateau

Patrizio Buanne chronology
The Italian (2005)	Forever Begins Tonight (2006)	Patrizio (2009)

Alternative cover
- UK cover of Forever Begins Tonight

Forever Begins Tonight is the second album by Italian baritone Patrizio Buanne. It was released on 16 October 2006 in the United Kingdom and on 24 April 2007 in the United States.

Like his first album, The Italian, Buanne's second album is composed of fresh arrangements of romantic Italian tunes sung in Italian, English, and Spanish. It also presents some original songs written specifically for Buanne. Additionally, the album includes an Italian version of Robbie Williams' song "Angels" (called "Un Angelo").

At its peak, Forever Begins Tonight ranked number seven on Billboard's "Top World Music Albums" chart. In addition, it reached platinum status in Australia.

== Track listing ==
No.	Title	Writer(s)	Original artist	Length
1.	"Forever Begins Tonight"	Mike Stevens; Connor Reeves; Kabalia (Italian lyrics)		3:48
2.	"Angels"	Robbie Williams; Guy Chambers; Kabalia (Italian lyrics)	Robbie Williams	3:59
3.	"You're My World/Il mio mondo"	Umberto Bindi; Gino Paoli; Carl Sigman (English lyrics)	Cilla Black * Umberto Bindi	3:06
4.	"Always On My Mind (Vives en mi corazon)"	Wayne Carson; Johnny Christopher; Mark James; Victorio Pezzolla (Spanish lyrics)	Elvis Presley	4:23
5.	"Bella bella signorina (Guaglione)"	Giuseppe Fanciulli; Nicola "Nisa" Salerno; Steve Crosby (English lyrics)	Aurelio Fierro	3:33
6.	"Solo Tu (Only You)"	Buck Ram	The Platters	2:40
7.	"Io che non vivo-You Don't Have to Say You Love Me"	Pino Donaggio; Vito Pallavicini; Vicki Wickham; Simon Napier-Bell	Pino Donaggio * Dusty Springfield	2:58
8.	"Let's Make Love"	Marv Green; Aimee Mayo; Chris Lindsey; Victorio Pezzolla (Spanish lyrics)	Faith Hill & Tim McGraw	3:53
9.	"Sorridi"	Gary Lux; Christian Knollmüller; Patrizio Buanne; M. Lux; Steve Crosby	original song	4:11
10.	"Maledetta primavera"	Paolo Cassella; Gaetano Savio	Loretta Goggi	4:00
11.	"Malafemmena"	Totò	Totò	3:33
12.	"Vicin'o mare ('O marenariello)"	Gennaro Ottaviano; Salvatore Gambardella	Emilia Persico	4:08

== Special editions ==
As with Buanne's previous album The Italian, several different versions of Forever Begins Tonight were released worldwide. The track listing only changed slightly. Some editions contained an all-English version of Always On My Mind, an Italian version of Let's Make Love or the Champions' Theme Stand Up (an altered version of the Pet Shop Boys version of Go West).

== Charts ==
Chart	Peak position
Australian Albums Chart	7
Austrian Albums Chart	6
Finnish Albums Chart	18
New Zealand Albums Chart	21
South African Albums (RISA)	8
UK Albums Chart	15
US Billboard World Albums	7

== Certifications ==
Region	Certification	Certified units/sales
Australia (ARIA)	Gold	35,000^{^}
United Kingdom (BPI)	Silver	60,000^{‡}
^{^} Shipments figures based on certification alone.^{‡} Sales+streaming figures based on certification alone.
