= Pepino the Italian Mouse =

Single by Lou Monte
- B-side: "What Did Washington Say (When He Crossed The Delaware)"
- Released: 1962
- Genre: novelty song
- Length: 2:42
- Label: Reprise Records
- Songwriters: Ray Allen and Wandra Merrell
- Producer: Don Costa

Lou Monte singles chronology
"The Sheriff of Sicily" (1961)	"Pepino the Italian Mouse" (1962)	"Twist Italiano" (1962)

"Pepino the Italian Mouse" is a novelty song co-written by Ray Allen and Wandra Merrell and published in 1962. Italian American singer Lou Monte recorded and released the song on Reprise Records in 1962. Lou Monte's recording contains a high-pitched "mouse" voice in the style of Alvin and the Chipmunks. The song helped make Lou Monte famous and set the tone for the remainder of his career. The song contains both English and Italian verses. The song is controversial for its depiction of Italian culture. Monte's family collects royalty checks for the song. Songwriters Wandra Merrell and Ray Allen filed a federal lawsuit in U.S. District Court in Trenton against the Woody Allen movie Broadway Danny Rose claiming the melody of the film's theme song, "Agita" borrowed 49 of the 52 notes in the verse of "Pepino, the Italian Mouse".

== Synopsis ==
The song tells the story of a man and a mouse named Pepino who lives in the man's house. The man laments that the mouse scares his girl, eats his cheese, and drinks his wine. The man attempts to catch the mouse but gets tricked all the time. At the end of the song, Pepino tells the man to close his eyes and put his hand in a box, at which point a mousetrap snaps on the man's hand.

== Charts ==
Lou Monte's recording of "Pepino the Italian Mouse" reached No. 5 on the Billboard Hot 100 list for the week of January 12, 1963. In Canada the song reached No. 8 on the December 31, 1962, chart. The Song reached #5 on the New Zealand lever hit parade charts

== B-side ==
Lou Monte released the song alongside "What Did Washington Say (When He Crossed The Delaware)," written by Ray Allen, Sam Saltzberg, and Wandra Merrell.

== See also ==
- Novelty song
- "The Chipmunk Song (Christmas Don't Be Late)"
