= The Italian (album) =

Studio album by Patrizio Buanne
- Released: 28 February 2005
- Studio: Abbey Road Studios, London
- Genre: Adult contemporary; popera; oldies
- Language: Italian; English
- Label: Next Plateau Records
- Producer: Christian Seitz

Patrizio Buanne chronology
The Italian (2005)	Forever Begins Tonight (2006)

The Italian is the debut album by Italian baritone Patrizio Buanne. It was released in the United Kingdom on 28 February 2005, and the United States on 7 March 2006.

The album is composed of romantic Italian tunes, influenced by the songs of Italian and Italian-American singers (such as Sergio Bruni and Frank Sinatra) that Buanne heard played as a youth in his father's Italian restaurant. Buanne strives to re-invent the classics of that era with this new album of traditional songs arranged in a fresh style and sung in both Italian and English.

== Track listing ==
Standard edition
No.	Title	Writer(s)	Original artist	Length
1.	"Il mondo"	Carlo Pes; Lilli Greco; Gianni Meccia; Jimmy Fontana	Jimmy Fontana	3:09
2.	"Amore scusami (My Love, Forgive Me)"	Gino Mescoli; Vito Pallavicini; Sydney Lee	Robert Goulet	2:51
3.	"Parla più piano"	Gianni Boncompagni; Nino Rota	Gianni Morandi	3:04
4.	"A Man Without Love"	Daniele Pace; Mario Panzeri; Roberto Livraghi; Barry Mason	Anna Identici; Engelbert Humperdinck	3:25
5.	"Che sarà"	Jimmy Fontana; Franco Migliacci; Carlo Pes; Italo Nicola Greco	José Feliciano; Ricchi e Poveri	4:49
6.	"Come prima (For the First Time)"	Mario Panzeri; Vincenzo Di Paola; Alessandro Taccani	Tony Dallara	3:15
7.	"L'italiano"	Cristiano Minellono; Toto Cutugno	Toto Cutugno	3:59
8.	"Home to Mamma (Funiculì, funiculà)"	Christian Seitz; Patrizio Buanne; Luigi Denza	Mario Lanza * Beniamino Gigli	2:34
9.	"Luna mezz'o mare"	Paolo Citarella		2:36
10.	"Alta marea (Italian version of Don't Dream It's Over)"	Antonello Venditti; Neil Finn	Crowded House	4:28
11.	"Soli"	Toto Cutugno; Cristiano Minellono; Michele Del Prete	Adriano Celentano	3:55
12.	"On an Evening in Roma"	Umberto Bertini; Sandro Taccani; Frederics	Dean Martin	2:26
13.	"Credi in te"	Christian Knollmüller; Patrizio Buanne; Christian Seitz	original song	2:20
14.	"'Na sera 'e maggio"	Giuseppe Cioffi; Gigi Pisano	Carlo Buti	3:47

== Special Editions ==
There are several different editions available of the album worldwide. Some include That's Amore and Winter Wonderland as bonus tracks.

== Charts ==
Chart	Peak position
Australian Albums Chart	3
Austrian Albums Chart	8
Dutch Albums Chart	64
Finnish Albums Chart	11
Japanese Albums Chart	106
New Zealand Albums Chart	2
UK Albums Chart	10
US Billboard World Chart	5
US Heatseekers Albums (Billboard)	32

== Certifications ==
Region	Certification	Certified units/sales
Australia (ARIA)	2× Platinum	140,000^{^}
Austria (IFPI Austria)	Gold	15,000^{*}
United Kingdom (BPI)	Gold	100,000^{^}
^{*} Sales figures based on certification alone.^{^} Shipments figures based on certification alone.
