= Lou Monte =

Italian American singer (1917–1989)

Background information
- Born: Louis Scaglione; April 2, 1917; Manhattan, New York City, US.
- Died: June 12, 1989 (aged 72) Pompano Beach, Florida
- Genres: Novelty, pop
- Occupation: Musician
- Years active: 1940s–1989
- Labels: RCA Victor; Reprise Records; Roulette Records; Musicor Records; Laurie Records; AFE Records

Lou Monte (born Louis Scaglione; April 2, 1917 – June 12, 1989) was an Italian American singer best known for a number of best-selling, Italian-themed novelty records which he recorded for both RCA Victor and Reprise Records in the late 1950s and early 1960s, most famously "Lazy Mary" (1958) and the 1962/63 million-selling US single "Pepino the Italian Mouse", plus the seasonal track "Dominick the Donkey". He also recorded on Roulette Records, Jubilee Records, Regalia Records, Musicor Records, Laurie Records, and AFE Records.

== Early life ==
Monte was born on April 2, 1917, in Manhattan, New York City to Italian immigrant parents, but his mother died when he was only two. He was raised in Lyndhurst, New Jersey, and he began performing at the age of fourteen. But success came slowly: by his own account, although he sang and played guitar in a number of clubs, he did not begin to gain a large following for about fifteen years.

== Early career ==
By the early 1940s, he was performing in New York City, and he was also a headliner at several New Jersey clubs. But when World War II broke out, Monte had to put his career on hold and enlist in the Army. When he was discharged, he resumed playing in clubs, and got a break when he was hired by WAAT AM 970 in Newark, New Jersey, in 1948 to do his own show. This offered Monte a chance to refine his act and it helped him to gain a much larger audience. The station rewarded him by convincing its sister TV outlet, WATV/13, to give him some airtime.

Beginning with this exposure, Monte made a couple of recordings on local labels. Joe Carlton was an A&R for RCA Victor Records and heard him performing in a spaghetti joint south of Secaucus. He enjoyed his singing style and the way he accompanied himself on the guitar. He offered him a contract with RCA Victor which lasted seven years. Joe Carlton would go on to start Carlton Records.

== Success ==
Monte's first big hit came in 1954, with the release of his version of "Darktown Strutters' Ball". In 1962, Monte released his first million-seller song, "Pepino the Italian Mouse", which was awarded a gold disc. Co-written by Ray Allen and Wandra Merrell and sung alternately in English and a pastiche of Calabrese, "Pepino the Italian Mouse" tells the humorous tale of a mischievous mouse who lives within the walls of a man's home and who pesters him by eating his cheese, drinking his wine and frightening his girlfriend. Arranged by Joe Reisman, who was Monte's longtime collaborator, the single is credited to Don Costa Productions. "Pepino" peaked at number five on Billboard's Hot 100 in mid-January and fared even better in certain markets, including Monte's native New York City, where the single spent two weeks at number one on WABC at the end of December.

The "flip side" of the single featured another Italian-American hybrid novelty song called "What Did Washington Say (When He Crossed The Delaware?)." The song presumes that George Washington was cold, tired, hungry and without a change of underwear on his famous trip. At one point in the song, "Washington" complains that the pizzas his wife Martha baked were as "cold as ice". His solution? "Sell them to the Indians for only half the price." He then asks his boatsmen to row faster because "tonight I'm posing for my picture on the dollar bill."

Monte's other famous novelty records include "Dominick the Donkey", a Christmas staple in many Italian-American households and "Pepino's Friend Pasqual (The Italian Pussy-Cat)", the sequel to "Pepino" followed by "Paulucci, the Italian Parrot" and "Paul Revere's Horse (Ba-Cha-Ca-Loop)". "Lazy Mary", a remake of the Italian song "Luna Mezzo Mare", tells the tale of a conversation between a young woman who wishes to be married, and her mother. The somewhat risque song mixes English and Italian verses. The two use double entendre to compare the occupations with the sexual appetites of the various suitors. It peaked at number 12 on the U.S. Pop Singles chart. "Lazy Mary" is routinely played during the seventh inning stretch at New York Mets games (both at Shea Stadium and now at Citi Field), immediately after "Take Me Out To The Ballgame".

"Dominick the Donkey" has enjoyed more recent success in the UK, thanks to its extensive use on The Chris Moyles Show in reference to Newsbeat newsreader and regular show contributor Dominic Byrne during the Christmas season. During the week leading up to Christmas of 2011, the show suggested or hinted that users download the song from iTunes and Amazon. This led to the song being the number two song on iTunes between December 19–25, 2011. "Dominick the Donkey" reached number 3 in the midweek charts on 21 December 2011, before being confirmed at number 3 in the UK Official Christmas Chart for 2011, only beaten by the X-Factor winners (Little Mix) and a charity record by the Military Wives. Dominic the Donkey did however outsell several rival chart campaigns most notably campaigns supporting Nirvana's rerelease of "Smells Like Teen Spirit", which made number 11, and unsigned YouTube blogger Alex Day, who reached number 4.

A portion of Monte's song "Skinny Lena" has notably been sampled into the They Might Be Giants track "Number Three."

Monte made TV appearances on syndicated programming such as The Mike Douglas Show, The Ed Sullivan Show and the Merv Griffin Show.

Monte resided in Totowa, New Jersey, where his fan club was based. He contributed to the founding of the Lou Monte, Jr., leukemia laboratory at the University of Medicine and Dentistry of New Jersey, in memory of his son who died of the disease at age 21.

Monte's 1971 recording "I Have An Angel In Heaven" was highly popular in the late 1980s and early 1990s satellite radio version of the "Music Of Your Life."

Monte is interred in the Immaculate Conception Cemetery in Upper Montclair, New Jersey. After his death, his surviving son Ray continued to sing his songs in concert for some time. His son is a professional drummer who plays for many bands.

== Discography ==
=== Singles ===
- 1953 − Jealous of You / Angelina
- 1953 − A Baby Cried / One Moment More
- 1954 − Darktown Strutters Ball / I Know How You Feel
- 1954 − Somewhere There Is Someone / Won't You Forgive Me
- 1954 − Chain Reaction / Vera's Veranda
- 1954 − Italian Huckle−Buck / Just Like Before
- 1954 − When I Hold You In My Arms / In My Dreams
- 1954 − Cats Whiskers / Roulette
- 1955 − How Important Can It Be / Truly Yours
- 1955 − The Italian Wallflower / Dream Boat
- 1955 − Bella Notte / With You Beside Me
- 1955 − Yaller Yaller Gold / King Of The River
- 1955 − Tombolee Tombola / Rosina
- 1955 − Santo Natale / Italian Jingle Bells
- 1955–60 − The Long Way / Repeat These Words After Me
- 1956 − Nina, The Queen of the Teeners / Pony Tail
- 1956 − If I Knew You Were Coming I'd've Baked A Cake / Ask Your Heart
- 1956 − Elvis Presley For President / If I Was A Millionaire
- 1956 − Roman Guitar / Some Cloud Above
- 1957 − Calypso Italiano / Someone Else Is Taking You Home
- 1957 − Musica Bella / The Wife
- 1957 − Ha! Ha! Ha! / Round and Round My Heart
- 1958 − Lazy Mary / Angelique
- 1958 − Eh Marie, Eh Marie / Sheik of Araby
- 1958 − Marianna / Strada 'Nfosa
- 1958 − Skinny Lena / Where Do You Work Marie
- 1959 − Pizza boy−U.S.A. / The Italian Cowboy Song
- 1959 − The Angel in The Fountain / Solo Per Te
- 1959 − Pistol Packin` Mama / Have Another
- 1959 − All Because it's Christmas / Santa Nicola
- 1960 − Remember This Gumba / Guarda Che Luna
- 1960 − Darktown Strutters’ Ball / Half A Love
- 1960 − Bim Bam Bu / Oh, Oh, Rosie
- 1960 − The Huckle−Buck / Always You
- 1960 − Dominick The Italian Christmas Donkey / Christmas at Our House
- 1960−61 − The Three Italian Bears / Come Prima*
- 1961 − A Good Man is Hard to Find / Sixteen Tons
- 1961 − Oh! My Pa−Pa, O Mio Papa / Tici Ti Tici To Tici Ta
- 1961 − The Sheriff Of Sicily / Katareena
- 1962 − Pepino The Italian Mouse / What Did Washington Say (When he Crossed The Delaware)
- 1962 − Twist Italiano / Oh Tessie
- 1962 − Please Mr. Columbus (Turn the Ship Around) / Addio, Addio
- 1963 − Down Little Doggie / La Luna Si Cuole Sposare
- 1963 − Pepino's Friend Pasqual (The Italian Pussy−Cat) / I Like You, You Like Me, Eh Paisan
- 1963 − Bossa Nova Italiano / Limbo Italiano
- 1963 − Paulucci / You're So Smart, You're So Smart, Eh Papa
- 1963 − Who Stole My Provolone / Hootennany Italian Style
- 1964 − A Baby Cried / Rooster And The Hen
- 1964 − Hello Dolly / Jungle Louie
- 1964 − Too Fat Polka / You're So Bella Isabella
- 1964 − I Want To Hold Your Hand (Italian Style) / My Paisans Across The Way
- 1965 − Six O'Clock Supper / Mama Get The Hammer
- 1965 − Oh Lonesome Me / Paul Revere's Horse
- 1965 − I Know How You Feel / Mixed Up Bull From Palermo
- 1965 − No, No Don't Cry, My Love / Don't Wish Your Heartbreak On Me
- 1966 − Cheech the Cat / Makin' Whoopee
- 1966 − Seventeen / Oh How I Miss You Tonight
- 1967 − There'll Be Some Changes Made / When You Get What You Want
- 1967 − Digga Digga Baby / A Girl, A Girl
- 1967 − I Don't Play With Matches Anymore / All For The Kids*
- 1968 − My Wife, The Dancer / Leaky Gondola
- 1969 − Goombar Custer's Last Stand / Tattooed Susie
- 1972 − I Really Don't Want To Know / I Have An Angel In Heaven
- 1972 − She's Got To Be A Saint /
- 1976 − Paul Revere's Horse / Jerusalem, Jerusalem
- 1977 − Crabs Walk Sideways / Nicolina
- 1981 − Shadda Up You Face / Lazy Mary

(*)Promotion release to radio stations only.

=== EPs ===
Lou Monte Sings for You (196x) RCA Victor EPA-4177

1. Lazy Mary
2. Don't Say Forever
3. Mama
4. Just Say I Love Her

Lazy Mary (196x) RCA Victor EPA-5105

1. Darktown Strutters Ball
2. Lazy Mary
3. Eh, Marie! Eh, Marie!
4. Italian Huckle Buck

Lou Monte Darktown Strutters Ball RCA Victor EPA-568

1. A Baby Cried
2. One Moment Please
3. Darktown Strutters Ball
4. Won't You Forgive Me

Pepino, the Italian Mouse & Other Italian Fun Songs (1961) Reprise # R-6058 EP

1. Pepino the Italian Mouse
2. Twist Italiano
3. What did Washington Say
4. Please Mr. Columbus (Turn The Ship Around)
5. A Good Man is Hard to Find
6. Mala Femmena
7. Show Me the Way to Go Home

=== Albums ===
Lou Monte Sings for You (1957) RCA Victor LPM 1651

1. Lazy Mary (Luna Mezza Mare)
2. Don't Say Forever (O sole mio)
3. Just Say I Love Her
4. When I Hold You In My Arms
5. I Have But One Heart
6. Darktown Strutters Ball (Italian Style)
7. Mama (Mamma)
8. Tango Of Roses (Tango del Rosa)
9. Now Is The Time (Torna a Surriento)
10. Roman Guitar (Chitarra Romana)
11. Non Dimenticar (Don't Forget)
12. Italian Huckle-Buck (The Huckle Buck)

Here's Lou Monte (1958) RCA CAMDEN Cal-455

1. Tombolee Tombola
2. Bella Notte
3. Rosina! (The Menu Song)
4. Angelina
5. I've Got A Crush On You
6. Liza (All the Clouds'll Roll Away)
7. Fascinating Rhythm
8. Mine
9. Jealous of You (Tango della Gelosia)
10. A Baby Cried

Lou Monte Sings Songs for Pizza Lovers (1958) RCA Victor LPM-1877

1. The Sheik Of Araby (Italian Style)
2. Jealous of You (Tango della Gelosia)
3. Bony Lena
4. Calypso Italiano
5. If I Knew You Were Comin' I'd've Baked A Cake (Italian Style)
6. Ha! Ha! Ha! (Cha lla La!)
7. Eh, Marie! Eh, Marie!
8. The Wife (La Mogliera)
9. Musica Bella (The Beautiful Music Of Love)
10. Angelique
11. Round And Round My Heart
12. Italian Jingle Bells

Italian House Party (1959) RCA Victor LPM 1976

1. Hey Gumbaree (Bibadee Bobadee Bu)
2. Tell Me You're Mine
3. Where Do You Work Marie
4. Senza Mama E Nnammurata!
5. Solo Perte (Only for You)
6. Pizza Boy USA
7. The Italian Cowboy Song
8. The Angel In The Fountain
9. Skinny Lena
10. Strada 'Nfosa
11. Marianna
12. Bella Donna

Italiano USA (1960) Roulette R-25126 / SR-25126

1. The Huckle-Buck (Italian Style)
2. Always You
3. Stella D' Amore (Star Of Love)
4. Rag Mop
5. Half A Love
6. Bim Bam Bu (Fruit Store Man)
7. Music Goes 'Round And Round
8. Tango Della Gelosia
9. Innamorata (Sweetheart) from the Paramount film "Artists And Models"*
10. (The New) Darktown Strutters' Ball (Italian Style)
11. Dawn Of Love (L'Edera)
12. Lazy River (Italian Style)

Lou Monte Sings the Great Italian American Hits (1961) Reprise R-6005 / R9-6005

1. That's Amore
2. Sixteen Tons
3. Sorrento
4. Volare
5. Abbracciami
6. I'm Walkin'
7. A Good Man Is Hard To Find
8. Chitarra Romana (Roman Guitars)
9. O Sole Mio
10. Luna Luna Luna Lu
11. Via Veneto
12. Comm'e Bella A Stagione (When I Hold You In My Arms)

Lou Monte Live!!! In Person (1962) Reprise R-6014 / R9-6014

1. Just Say I Love Her
2. Darktown Strutters Ball
3. Roman Guitars (Chitarra Romana)
4. Sheik Of Napoli (Sheik of Napoli)
5. Lazy Mary
6. Mama
7. Eh Marie, Eh Marie
8. Mala Femina
9. Self - Portrait of Lou Monte at Home
10. 16 Tons
11. When I Lost You
12. Skinny Lena
13. Sorrento

Pepino, the Italian Mouse & Other Italian Fun Songs (1962) Reprise R-6058 LP (No. 9 US)

1. Pepino, the Italian Mouse
2. Calypso Italiano
3. Oh Tessie
4. Tici Ti-Tica To-Tici Ta
5. Show Me the Way to Go Home
6. What did Washington Say (When He Crossed The Delaware)
7. Please Mr. Columbus (Turn The Ship Around)
8. A Good Man is Hard to Find
9. Eh Marie, Eh Marie
10. Sixteen Tons
11. Mala Femmena
12. Twist Italiano

Spotlight on Lou Monte & Botti-Endor Quartet (1962) SDLP-149 Stereo Spectrum Records / Design Records

1. Oh Mari, O' Sole Mio, Oh Mari
2. Tell You What I'm Gonna Do
3. Oh Baby Kiss Me
4. Yesterday's Memories
5. Pullechinella
6. Americano
7. You're Welcome
8. Ciao Capri
9. If I Could Know
10. Funiculi Funicula, Marenariello, Funiculi Funicula

More Italian Fun Songs From Lou Monte & The Gang (1963) Reprise R-6099 / R9-6099

1. Pepino's Friend Pasqual (The Italian Pussy-Cat)
2. La Luna Si Vuole Sposare
3. Pepino's Cha Cha
4. Tell Me That You Love Me (Parlami d'amore Mariù)
5. I Like You You Like Me Eh Paisan
6. Paulucci (The Italian Parrot)
7. Bossa Nova Italiano
8. You're So Smart, You're So Smart, Eh Papa
9. Arrivederci, Roma
10. Tijuana Italiano
11. Oh! My Pa-Pa O Mio Papa
12. Limbo Italiano

Lou Monte's Golden Hits (1964) Reprise R-6118 / RS-6118

1. Lazy Mary (Luna Mezzo Mare) (LIVE)
2. Roman Guitar (Chitarra Romana)
3. Pepino The Italian Mouse
4. Mama (LIVE)
5. Darktown Strutters Ball (LIVE)
6. Please Mr. Columbus (Turn The Ship Around)
7. The Shiek of Araby (LIVE)
8. When I Hold You In My Arms (Comm'a Bella'a Stagione)
9. Eh Marie, Eh Marie (LIVE)
10. Pepino's Friend Pasqual
11. Mala Femmena (LIVE)
12. What Did Washington Say

The Mixed-Up Bull from Palermo (1965) Reprise R/RS-6155

1. The Mixed Up Bull From Palermo
2. Think It Over
3. My Paisan's Across The Way
4. Hootennany Italian Style
5. I Know How You Feel
6. Skinny Lena
7. Hello Dolly (Italian Style)
8. You're So Bella, Isabella
9. Jungle Louie (The Italian Tarzan)
10. Too Fat Polka (Italian Style)
11. Who Stole My Provolone
12. Down Little Doggie

The Best of Lou Monte (1966) RCA Victor LPM 3672 / LSP 3672

1. The Darktown Strutters Ball
2. Italian Huckle Buck
3. Roman Guitars
4. Lazy Mary
5. Eh Marie, Eh Marie
6. The Shiek of Araby
7. Just Say I Love Her
8. Hey Gumbaree(Bibadee Bobadee Bu)
9. When I Hold You In My Arms (Comm'a Bella'a Stagione)
10. Skinny Lena
11. Calypso Italiano

Lou Monte Sings Good Time Songs (1967) RCA Victor LPM-3705 /LSP-3705

1. Oh How I Miss You Tonight
2. By The Light of The Silvery Moon
3. The Gang That Sang Heart Of My Heart
4. Wedding Bells Are Breaking up That Old Gang Of Mine
5. I Wonder Who's Kissing Her Now
6. Let The Rest Of The World Go By
7. When Your Old Wedding Ring Was New
8. What Can I Say After I Say I'm Sorry
9. Maybe
10. Are You Lonesome Tonight
11. That Old Gang Of Mine
12. Who's Sorry Now

Lou Monte, Fun Italian Style (1975) Tele House CD-2046 (2-LP set)

Disc One

1. Pepino the Italian Mouse
2. Eh Marie, Eh Marie
3. Sixteen Tons
4. Hello Dolly
5. Too Fat Polka
6. Jungle Louie
7. Lazy Mary
8. The Sheik of Napoli
9. My Paisans Across The Way
10. Bossa Nova Italiano
11. What Did Washington Say (When He Crossed The Delaware)
12. Pepino's Cha Cha Cha
13. That's Amore

Disc Two

1. Darktown Strutters Ball
2. Calypso Italiano
3. Paulucci (The Italian Parrot)
4. Twist Italiano
5. Hootenanny Italian Style
6. Tijuana Italiano
7. A Good Man is Hard To Find
8. Skinny Lena
9. I'm Walking
10. Think it Over
11. Oh TessieTake
12. Please Mr. Columbus (Turn The Ship Around)
13. Pepino's Friend Pasqual (The Italian Pussy-Cat)

Lou Monte Discovers America (1976) Tele House CDS-1

1. Paul Revere's Horse
2. What Did Washington Say
3. Please Mr. Columbus
4. Skinny Lena
5. Nicolena
6. Heart of My Heart
7. By the Light of the Silvery Moon
8. Who's Sorry Now
9. That Old Gang of Mine
10. Oh How I Miss You Tonight
11. Maybe
12. Let the Rest of the World Go By

Lou Monte's Greatest Hits (1977) Laurie Records LES-4005

1. Peppino, Jealous of You
2. The Sheik of Napoli
3. Paul Revere's Horse
4. Mama
5. Lazy Mary
6. Skinny Lena
7. Jerusalem, Jerusalem
8. Nicolena
9. Crabs Walk Sideways
10. In My Own Little Way I Pray
11. Darktown Strutter's Ball

Shaddap You Face (1981) AFE Records AFE-7500

1. Shaddap You Face
2. Skinny Lena
3. Babalucci
4. Mama
5. Pepino the Italian Mouse
6. Darktown Strutters Ball
7. Lazy Mary
8. Nicolina
9. Jealous of You
10. The Sheik of Araby

Pepino Meets Babalucci (198?) LSFD Records

1. Babalucci
2. Shaddap You Face
3. Pepino the Italian Mouse
4. Nicolina
5. Skinny Lena
6. Lazy Mary
7. Angel in Heaven
8. She's Got to Be a Saint
9. Mama
10. Mala Femina
11. Jealous of You
12. Bella Notta

=== CDs ===
Here's Lou Monte (CD) (1997) BMG/Special Music # CDA1-0455 (RCA Victor Re-release of the album by the same name)

The Very Best Of Lou Monte (1997) Taragon Records BMG Special Products (RCA Victor re-release) TARCD-1030 DRC1-1428

Lou Monte Sings Songs for Pizza Lovers/Lou Monte Sings for You (1999) Collectable Records Corp. BMG Special Products (RCA Victor re-release) COL-CD-2745 DRC1 2333 Songs from(The Album "Songs For Pizza Lovers" was originally released in 1958 as RCA 1877)

(The Album " Lou Monte Sings for You" was originally released in 1958 as RCA 1651)

(Bonus Tracks originally released in 1958 as selections from the Album RCA 1976-"Italian House Party".)

Lou Monte The Best Of RCA VICTOR Recordings (2003) Taragon Records BMG Special Products (RCA Victor re-release) TARCD-1101 DRC23075

Lou Monte's Golden Hits (2004) Collectables COL-CD-6156 (Re-release of the album by the same name) (Reprise Re-release of the album by the same name

The Mixed Up Bull From Palermo And Other Italian Fun Songs (2004) Release Collectable COL 6716 (Reprise Re-release of the album by the same name.)

Lou Monte Sings for Your...Again (2002) Ronray Records*

1. Pepino the Italian Mouse
2. She's Got To Be A Saint
3. Nicolina
4. I Have An Angel In Heaven
5. Lazy Mary
6. An Old Fashioned Girl
7. Cathedral Town
8. Skinny Lena
9. I Really Don't Want To Know
10. Fascinating Rhythm
11. I've Got A Crush On You
12. Sheik Of Araby
13. The Darktown Strutters Ball

Lou Monte's Greatest Hits Part 2 (2007) Ronray Records*

1. Shaddap You Face
2. Lazy Mary
3. The Sheik of Napoli
4. Darktown Strutters Ball
5. Jerusalem, Jerusalem
6. Babalucci
7. Mrs. Brown's Donkey (never before released)
8. Darktown Disco
9. The Sheik Disco
10. In My Own Little Way

Plus 6 more tracks of outtakes.

- *Monte's two surviving sons produced these two CDs

== Recording label history ==
- RCA Victor 1953-1960
- Jubilee Records 1955-1960?
- Roulette Records 1960-1961
- Reprise Records 1961-1965
- RCA Victor 1965-1967
- Musicor Records 1968
- Regalia Records 1969
- GWP Records 1971
- Jamie Records 1972
- Laurie Records 1976-1977
- AFE Records 1981

== Special recordings ==
Soundtracks Two musical soundtrack albums were made with various recording artist under "Reprise Musical Repertory Theatre Presents".

- Finian's Rainbow Reprise Records - FS 2015 - STEREO
1. Overture
2. THE HI-LOS - This Time of Year
3. ROSEMARY CLOONEY- How Are Things in Glocca Morra?
4. DEAN MARTIN & THE HI-LOS - If This Isn't Love
5. ROSEMARY CLOONEY - Look to the Rainbow
6. BING CROSBY & DEBBIE REYNOLDS - Something Sort of Grandish
7. FRANK SINATRA - Old Devil Moon
8. SAMMY DAVIS JR - Necessity
9. FRANK SINATRA - When I'm Not Near The Girl I Love
10. LOU MONTE & THE MARY KAYE TRIO - When The Idle Poor Become The Idle Rich
11. THE McGUIRE SISTERS - The Begat
12. CLARK DENNIS - How Are Things In Glocca Morra? (Reprise)
13. SAMMY DAVIS JR - The Great Come-And-Get-It Day
- Kiss Me, Kate "Where Is The Life That Late I Led?"

Radio Station Program Recordings

- The Office of Civil Defense and Mobilization recorded a series of record albums entitle "Stars for Defense" 1958–1967.
- Lou Monte - Speaks side B (Tony Perkins Speaks side A) RCA VICTOR (radio station copy only).

This record was used for commercial breaks with the singer informing the public of the upcoming "News", "Weather", "Time", etc.

Date	Song	Label
1953	Jealous of You / Angelina	RCA
1953	A Baby Cried / One Moment More	RCA
1954	Darktown Strutters Ball / I Know How You Feel	RCA
1954	Somewhere There Is Someone / Won't You Forgive Me	RCA
1954	Chain Reaction / Vera's Veranda	RCA
1954	Italian Huckle-Buck / Just Like Before	RCA
1954	When I Hold You In My Arms / In My Dreams	RCA
1954	Cats Whiskers / Roulette	RCA
1955	How Important Can It Be / Truly Yours	RCA
1955	The Italian Wallflower / Dream Boat	RCA
1955	Bella Notte / With You Beside Me	RCA
1955	Yaller Yaller Gold / King Of The River	RCA
1955	Tombolee Tombola / Rosina	RCA
1956	Nina, The Queen of the Teeners / Pony Tail	RCA
1956	If I Knew You Were Coming I'd've Baked A Cake / Ask Your Heart	RCA
1956	Elvis Presley For President / If I Was A Millionaire	RCA
1957	Calypso Italiano / Someone Else Is Taking You Home	RCA
1957	Musica Bella / The Wife	RCA
1957	Ha! Ha! Ha! / Round and Round My Heart	RCA
1958	Lazy Mary / Angelique	RCA
1958	Eh Marie, Eh Marie / Sheik of Araby	RCA
1958	Marianna / Strada 'Nfosa	RCA
1958	Skinny Lena / Where Do You Work Marie	RCA
1959	Pizza boy-U.S.A. / The Italian Cowboy Song	RCA
1959	The Angel in The Fountain / Solo Per Te	RCA
1959	Pistol Packin` Mama / Have Another	RCA
1959	All Because it's Christmas / Santa Nicola	RCA
1960	The Huckle-Buck / Always You	ROULETTE
1960	Dominic The Italian Christmas Donkey / Christmas at Our House	ROULETTE
1960	The Three Italian Bears / Come Prima (Promo Only)	ROULETTE
1961	A Good Man is Hard to Find / Sixteen Tons	REPRISE
