= Wunderbar (Patrizio Buanne album) =

- album cover of Wunderbar

Studio album by Patrizio Buanne
- Released: 27 January 2012
- Genre: Adult contemporary; popera; oldies
- Language: German; English; Italian
- Label: Teldec / Warner

Patrizio Buanne chronology
Patrizio (2009)	Wunderbar (2012)	Viva la Dolce Vita (2015)

Alternative cover
- cover of the bonus edition of Wunderbar

Wunderbar is an album by Italian baritone Patrizio Buanne released on 27 January 2012. It is his first album, and is mainly sung in German.

Most songs on this album are cover versions, whereas "Du warst das Boot auf dem Meer der Farben" and "Wunderbar" were especially written for this album. A bonus edition of this album was released on 12 October 2012, containing two additional Christmas songs: a German/Italian version of "Jingle Bells" and "Stille Nacht".

== Track listing ==
No.	Title	Writer(s)	Original artist	Length
1.	"Wunderbar"	Patrizio Buanne; Marc Hiller; Achim Radloff; Florian Richter	original song	3:32
2.	"Dein ist mein ganzes Herz / Tu che m'hai preso il cuor"	Franz Lehár; Fritz Löhner-Beda; G. Rastelli; Mario Panzeri	Richard Tauber	3:34
3.	"Buona sera signorina"	Peter de Rose; Carl Sigman; Axel Weingarten	Louis Prima	3:01
4.	"Bella Italia"	Jean Frankfurter; Stephan Lego; John Moering	Imca Marina	3:18
5.	"Sie War Da"	María Grever; Michael Kunze	Julio Iglesias	3:17
6.	"Come le viole"	Amendola; Gagliardi	Peppino Gagliardi	3:19
7.	"Marina"	Rocco Granata	Rocco Granata	3:12
8.	"Luna Rossa"	A. Vian; H. Frank; R. Matassa		3:28
9.	"Du warst das Boot auf dem Meer der Farben"	Norbert Endlich; Marc Hiller; Neumi Neumann	original song	3:22
10.	"Mamma"	Bruno Balz; Cesare Bixio; Bixio Cherubini	Beniamino Gigli	3:12
11.	"Mein Vater (Winnetou Melodie)"	Martin Böttcher; Marc Hiller		3:47
12.	"Grazie Mille (Ganz in Weiß)"	Rolf Arland; Kurt Hertha	Roy Black	3:45

== Charts ==
Chart	Peak position
Austrian Albums Chart	27
