= Gegè Di Giacomo =

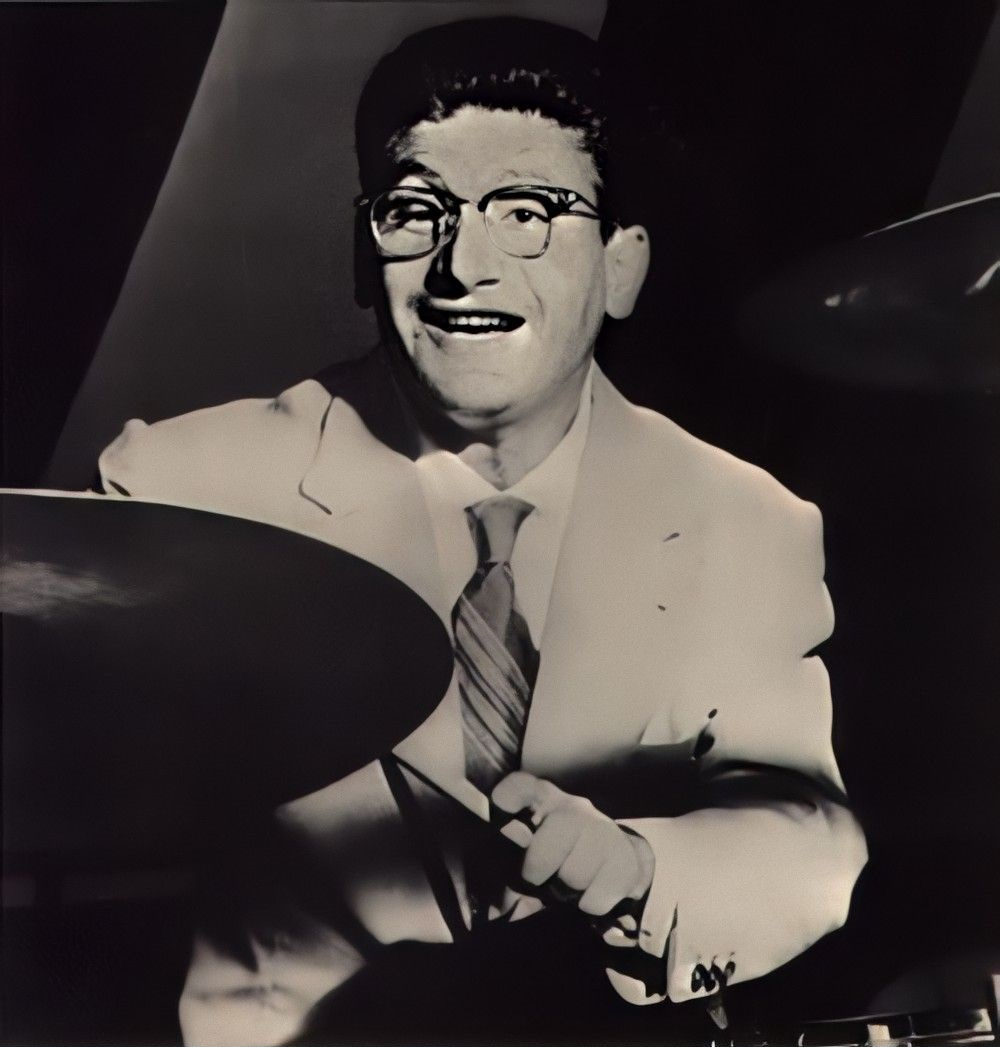

Background information
- Born: Gennaro Di Giacomo; 14 January 1918; Naples, Italy
- Died: 1 April 2005 (aged 87) Naples, Italy
- Genres: Popular music, jazz
- Occupations: Drummer; Singer

Gennaro Di Giacomo (January 14, 1918 – April 1, 2005) was an Italian drummer and singer.

== Biography ==
Nephew of the poet Salvatore Di Giacomo, he began to play the drums and cymbals in a band with his brother Pino – who played the snare drum (before such band managed to acquire a whole set) throughout the ten years of engagement at the Cinema Sansone, where – it being the silent era – it provided the soundtrack of films being shown; thus learning the art to create unorthodox, percussive sounds by using non-instrument objects as percussion.

After working in the orchestras of Gino Campese, Nello Segurini, Armando Del Conte and Gino Dome, during the Second World War, Gegè di Giacomo was hired by Renato Carosone, on 28 October 1949, together with the Dutch guitarist Peter Van Wood, to become part of the trio that would mark a turning point in the history of Neapolitan song.

The first hit record of the trio – recorded for Pathé – contains "Music, music, music" played by Renato Carosone and Gegè Di Giacomo and sung by Peter Van Wood (who left in 1952 to pursue a solo career).

Gegè Di Giacomo however remained, alongside Carosone who in the meantime had hired other musicians to form his own band, which defined itself completely in the second half of the fifties as the "Complesso Carosone" (i.e. the "Carosone ensemble").

Many of the songs were born from Carosone's long collaboration with lyricist Nisa, and the merit of the extraordinary international success of these was also Gege's. On the evening of 13 May 1954 at the Caprice nightclub in Milan during their song "La pansè", Gege suddenly shouted "Canta Napoli! Napoli in fiore". This became his battle cry, perfectly adapted to all the songs he performed, most of them narrated in first person such as "Pigliate 'na pastiglia" ("Napoli in farmacia!") and "Caravan petrol" ("Napoli petrolifera!").

On 6 January 1958 Carosone and his band began in Cuba a highly successful American tour, concluding with a triumphant concert at the Carnegie Hall in New York.

After Carosone's retirement (on 7 September 1959), Di Giacomo carried on for a while solo, appearing at the 1961 Festival of Naples and in 1962 after forming his own group. Finding little success, he also decided to bid farewell to performance life, making a sole appearance beside his friend Renato after his return to public performances, on 9 August 1975.

== Personal life ==
On his eighty-fifth birthday, the President of the Campania Region, Antonio Bassolino, and councilor Teresa Amato gave him the Premio Carosone Poggioreale at his home, where he died two years later.
