= Buona Sera =

Song written by Carl Sigman and Peter deRose

"Buona Sera" (sometimes titled "Buona Sera, Signorina") is a song written by Carl Sigman and Peter de Rose, and best known for being performed by Louis Prima in 1956. It reached number one in the singles charts in Belgium, the Netherlands and Norway, and is ranked number 3 on the all-time best-selling singles chart in Flanders between 1954 and 2014, as compiled by Ultratop. Prima's track also reached number 25 in the UK Singles Chart in February 1958.

Ralf Bendix reached number 5 in Germany with his recording of the same song in 1958. In the same year, Dean Martin recorded the song on his This is Dean Martin! album. Acker Bilk's version reached number 7 in the UK Singles Chart in 1960.

The song was used as the theme song for the second season of the TV series Platane, by Éric Judor in 2013.

On October 13 2023, The Gypsy Queens and Tony Danza released a version produced by Larry Klein and a video clip for the song, with cameo appearances from Michele Hicks and Nadia Farès as well as Joe Gannascoli. The original story was written by John Patrick Shanley, it was shot in New York and Nice.

== Other notable versions ==
- Swedish Rocksinger Little Gerhard made a cover which peaked at #1 for 17 weeks 1958 in Sweden and stayed in the bestselling chart for more than half a year.
- Bad Manners, UK, 1981 (number 34 in UK Singles Chart)
- The Gypsy Queens and Tony Danza, UK, 2023 (Sonico Productions)
- Van Morrison, USA, 1974 (It's Too Late to Stop Now, Warner Brothers)
