= C'è la luna mezzo mare =

"Luna mezz'o mare"
- Wedding scene from The Godfather (1972)

Song by Paolo Citorello
- Language: Sicilian
- English title: Moon amid the sea
- Released: 1927
- Recorded: 1927
- Genre: Tarantella

"C'è la luna" (Louis Prima, 1972)

"Cc'è la luna n menzu ô mari" (Sicilian for 'There's the moon amid the sea'), mostly known in the English-speaking world as "C'è la luna mezzo mare", "Luna mezz'o mare" and other similar titles, is a comic Sicilian song with worldwide popularity, traditionally styled as a brisk 6/8 tarantella. The song portrays a mother-daughter "coming of age" exchange consisting of various comic, and sometimes sexual, innuendos. It is frequently performed at Italian-American wedding receptions and other festive occasions. Hit versions have included "Oh! Ma-Ma! (The Butcher Boy)" by Rudy Vallée and "Lazy Mary (Luna Mezzo Mare)" by Lou Monte.

== Origin ==
Related music and lyrics appeared as early as 1835, in the art song "La Danza" (tarantella napoletana) by Gioachino Rossini and Carlo Pepoli. By 1871 in Italy, bawdier versions were circulating. In 1927, New York City's Italian Book Company arranged and recorded a version by Sicilian sailor Paolo Citorello (sometimes spelled Citarella), and an American court upheld their copyright in 1928.

== Popularity ==
Since the first recording in 1927, the song has proliferated with different titles and lyrics in English, Sicilian, and Neapolitan. Hit recordings in the United States have included "Oh! Ma-Ma!" by Rudy Vallée (1938, peaked at No. 8) and "Lazy Mary" by Lou Monte (1958, peaked at No. 12). Monte's version was initially banned from British broadcasts for undesirable innuendo, but has been played to a family-filled baseball stadium during the seventh-inning stretch at almost every New York Mets home game since the mid-1990s, as the result of a fan survey. The song was also recorded in Poland, in 1939, with lyrics by Jerzy Jurandot. The humorous lyrics center around a young woman wondering about marriage with various tradesmen (butcher, fisherman, fireman, etc.), ensuring the song's sustained popularity at Italian wedding receptions, including the opening scene of The Godfather (1972). The song was also included in the 2010 videogame Mafia II, as part of the fictional radio station Empire Classic. In early 2022 the song was used as part of a popular TikTok trend where creators would use the song showing things in their home that "just make sense" while making a stereotypical Italian hand gesture (the "mano a borsa", or pinched fingers) to the beat of the song.

In the sitcom Everybody Loves Raymond, the cast sang the song in the episodes "Mia Famiglia" and "Italy".

== Notable recordings ==
The song has been notably recorded with the following performers and titles:

- 1927: Paolo Citorello, "Luna mezzomare (Moonlight at Sea)" (Brunswick Records – 58042)
- 1928: Rosina Gioiosa, "Mi vogghiu maritari (I Want to Get Married)" (Brunswick Records – 58073)
- 1929: Paolo Citorello, "Mamma a cu m'addari"
- 1930: Paolo Citorello, "Mi vulissi maritari (I Want to Get Married)"
- 1930s: Silvia Coruzzolo, "A luna mezzo o mare"
- 1930s: I Diavoli, "La luna in mezzo al mare (A luna mmezzu 'u mari)"
- 1938: Rudy Vallée, "Oh! Ma-Ma! (The Butcher Boy)", 1975 compilation Jukebox Saturday Night. 96 Great Jukebox Hits (Reader's Digest – RDA 139-A)
- 1938: Billy Cotton and His Band, "Oh! Ma-Ma" (Rex – 9309)
- 1938: Joe Loss and His Band, "Oh! Ma-Ma!" (Regal Zonophone Records – MR 2785)
- 1938: Dick Robertson and His Orchestra, "Oh! Ma-Ma! (The Butcher Boy)" (Decca Records – 1726)
- 1938: Gracie Fields, "Oh! Ma-Ma (The Butcher Boy)" (Rex – 9350)
- 1938: Guy Lombardo and His Royal Canadians "Oh! Ma-Ma (The Butcher Boy)" (Victor – 25857)
- 1938: Nat Gonella & His Georgians "Oh! Ma-Ma" (Odeon Records – O.F. 5712)
- 1938: George Hall, "Oh! Ma Ma (The Butcher Boy)"
- 1938: Andrews Sisters, "Oh! Ma-Ma! (The Butcher Boy)" (Decca Records – 1859); 1957 album Andrews Sisters by Popular Demand (Decca Records – DL 8360)
- 1938: Gail Reese and Glenn Miller Orchestra, "Oh! Ma-Ma! (The Butcher Boy)", 2001 album The Complete Sustaining Broadcasts: Volume 3 - On the Sentimental Side (Jazz Band Records – EBCD 2180/81-2)
- 1939: Paolo Dones, "'A luna 'mmenzu 'u mari!" (Columbia Records – 14359-F)
- 1939: Albert Harris with Jerzy Gert's Orchestra (in Polish), "Ach, Mamo!" (Odeon Series O 271553 B)
- 1940: Trio Vocale Sorelle Lescano, "Ohi Ma - Ma! (Parlophon – G.P. 92840)
- 1946: Rose Marie, "Chena a luna", 1953 album Show Stoppers (Mercury Records – MG 25143)
- 1951: Dean Martin, "Luna mezzo mare" (Capitol Records – 1724); 1993 album Pardners (Fremus – CDFR 0507)
- 1954: Guy Lombardo and His Royal Canadians, "Oh! Ma-Ma" (Disque "Gramophone" – K-8170); album Guy Lombardo Plays (RCA Camden – CAL-255)
- 1958: Lou Monte, "Lazy Mary (Luna mezz 'o mare)", album Lou Monte Sings For You (Per te) (RCA Victor – LPM-1651)
- 1958: Johnny Puleo and His Harmonica Gang, "C'è la luna in mezzo mare", album Molto Italiano! (Audio Fidelity Records – AFLP 1883)
- 1960: The Mills Brothers, "Oh! Ma-Ma! (The Butcher Boy)" (Dot Records – 45-16049); 1974 album The Best of The Mills Brothers Volume II (Famous Twinsets – PAS-2-1027)
- 1961: Marianne, "Oh! Ma-Ma!" (Sonet Records – T 8109)
- 1961: Louis Prima, "Oh Ma Ma Twist" (Dot Records – 45-16301); 1962 compilation Februar I/1962 (Telefunken – MU 4)
- 1962: Marino Marini and his quartet "Oh! Ma-Ma Twist" (durium - Ld A 7201)
- 1963: Louis Prima, "Che-la-luna" (Prima Magnagroove – PS 3001); 1964 album The King of Clubs (Prima Magnagroove – PM 3003)
- 1973: Salix Alba, "Oh Mama" (Disques Vogue – VB. 278); album Salix Alba (Disques Vogue – CLPVB)
- 1975: I' Liguri, "Luna mezzo o mare", album I' Liguri (Complex IV – XPL-1055)
- 1979: De Deurzakkers, "Oh, Mama" (Philips - 6012 880)
- 1983: Stars on 45, album Star Sisters Album (Delta – DEL 7018)
- 1999: Frank Simms, "Luna mezzo mare", compilation Mickey Blue Eyes (Milan Records – 73138-35888-2)
- 2002: Enrique Rodríguez and his Orchestra, album El "Chato" Flores en el recuerdo (EMI – 7243 5 41705 2 2)
- 2005: Patrizio Buanne, "Luna mezz'o mare", album Patrizio The Italian (Universal Music TV – 9871823)
- 2013: Guido Luciani, "Luna mezzo mare", album That's amore! A night in Little Italy (Somerset Group)
- 2015: Famiglia Amica Valenza, "C'è la luna mezz'o mare"
- xxxx: Len Hughes and his Orchestra "Oh! Ma-Ma!" (Tempo - 667)
- xxxx: Kristian Haugers Danseorkester – "Oh, Ma-Ma" (Telefunken – T-8198)

== See also ==
- Music of Sicily
