= L'Americano (The Gypsy Queens) =

2012 popular music single

Single by The Gypsy Queens featuring The Boys from Made in Chelsea or Madeleine Peyroux

from the album The Gypsy Queens
- Released: December 13, 2012
- Recorded: 2012
- Genre: Pop
- Length: 1:58
- Label: London Records

"L'Americano" is a song performed by five-piece band The Gypsy Queens, featuring The Boys from Made in Chelsea, released on December 13, 2012 as a digital download in the United Kingdom on iTunes, peaking to number 53 on the UK Singles Chart. The song also features on their debut album The Gypsy Queens (2012) featuring vocals from Madeleine Peyroux. It is a cover of Renato Carosone's 1956 song "Tu Vuò Fà L'Americano".

== Music video ==
A music video to accompany the release of "L'Americano" was first released onto YouTube on October 31, 2012 at a total length of two minutes and fifteen seconds. A second music video was uploaded to YouTube on December 19, 2012.

== Sound Tracks ==
In 2022, their single "L'Americano" was featured in the Netflix Movie "Love in the villa".

== Track listing ==
Album version
No.	Title	Length
1.	"L'Americano" (feat. Madeleine Peyroux)	1:57

Digital download
No.	Title	Length
1.	"L'Americano" (feat. The Boys from Made in Chelsea)	1:58
2.	"L'Americano" (feat. The Boys from Made in Chelsea) (Music video)	2:05

== Chart performance ==
Chart (2012)	Peak position
UK Singles (Official Charts Company)	53

== Release history ==
Region	Date	Format	Label
United Kingdom	December 13, 2012	Digital download	London Records
