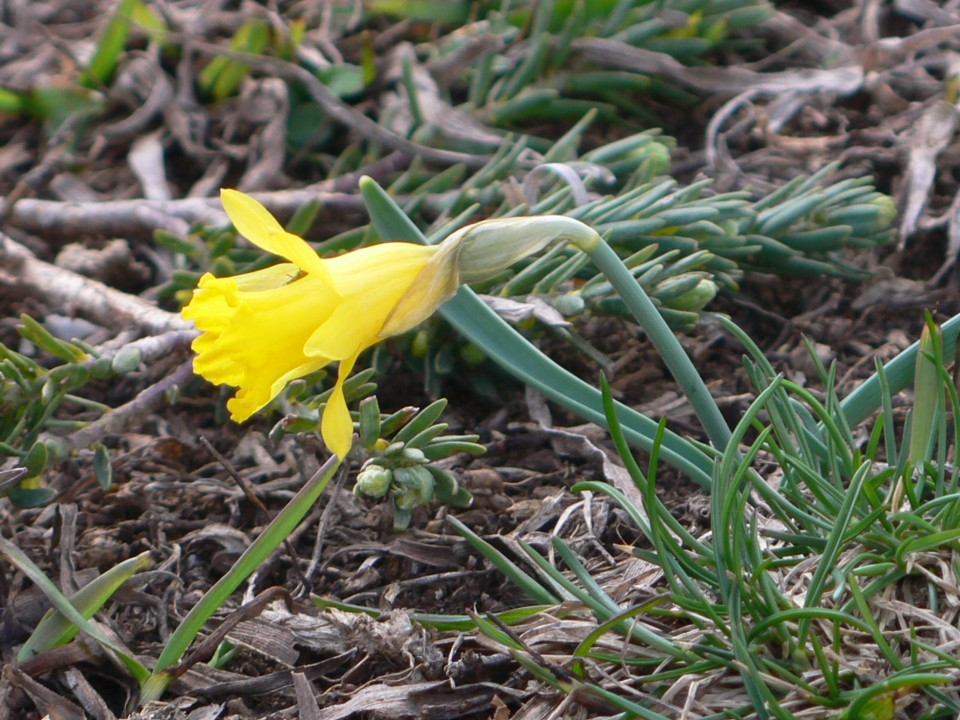

Scientific classification
- Kingdom: Plantae
- Clade: Tracheophytes
- Clade: Angiosperms
- Clade: Monocots
- Order: Asparagales
- Family: Amaryllidaceae
- Subfamily: Amaryllidoideae
- Genus: Narcissus
- Species: N. asturiensis

Binomial name
- Narcissus asturiensis (Jord.) Pugsley

Synonyms
- Ajax asturiensis Jord.; Ajax cuneiflorus Salisb. ex Haw.; Narcissus asturiensis subsp. villarvildensis (T.E.Díaz & Fern.Prieto) Rivas Mart., T.E.Díaz, Fern.Prieto, Loidi & Penas; Narcissus cuneiflorus (Salisb. ex Haw.) Link; Narcissus cyclamineus subsp. cohaerens Rozeira; Narcissus lagoi Merino; Narcissus minor subsp. asturiensis (Jord.) Barra & G.López; Narcissus salmanticensis Fern.Casas

= Narcissus asturiensis =

Species of daffodil

Narcissus asturiensis, the pygmy daffodil, is a perennial bulbous plant native to the mountains of North Portugal and Spain, where it grows at altitudes up to 2000 m (6000 ft). As of March 2022, Kew sources consider the correct name to be Narcissus cuneiflorus.

This dwarf Narcissus is 7–12 cm (2.5– 5 in) tall and has small yellow flowers growing singly.

This is a threatened species in the wild, but it is amenable to cultivation. It can be grown as a cold hardy garden plant, needing vernalization (a period of cold weather) in order to flower. As a garden plant, it will bloom in late January or early February at low altitudes.

This plant contains a number of alkaloids including hemanthamine, hemanthidine, tazettine and epimacronine.

== Further images ==
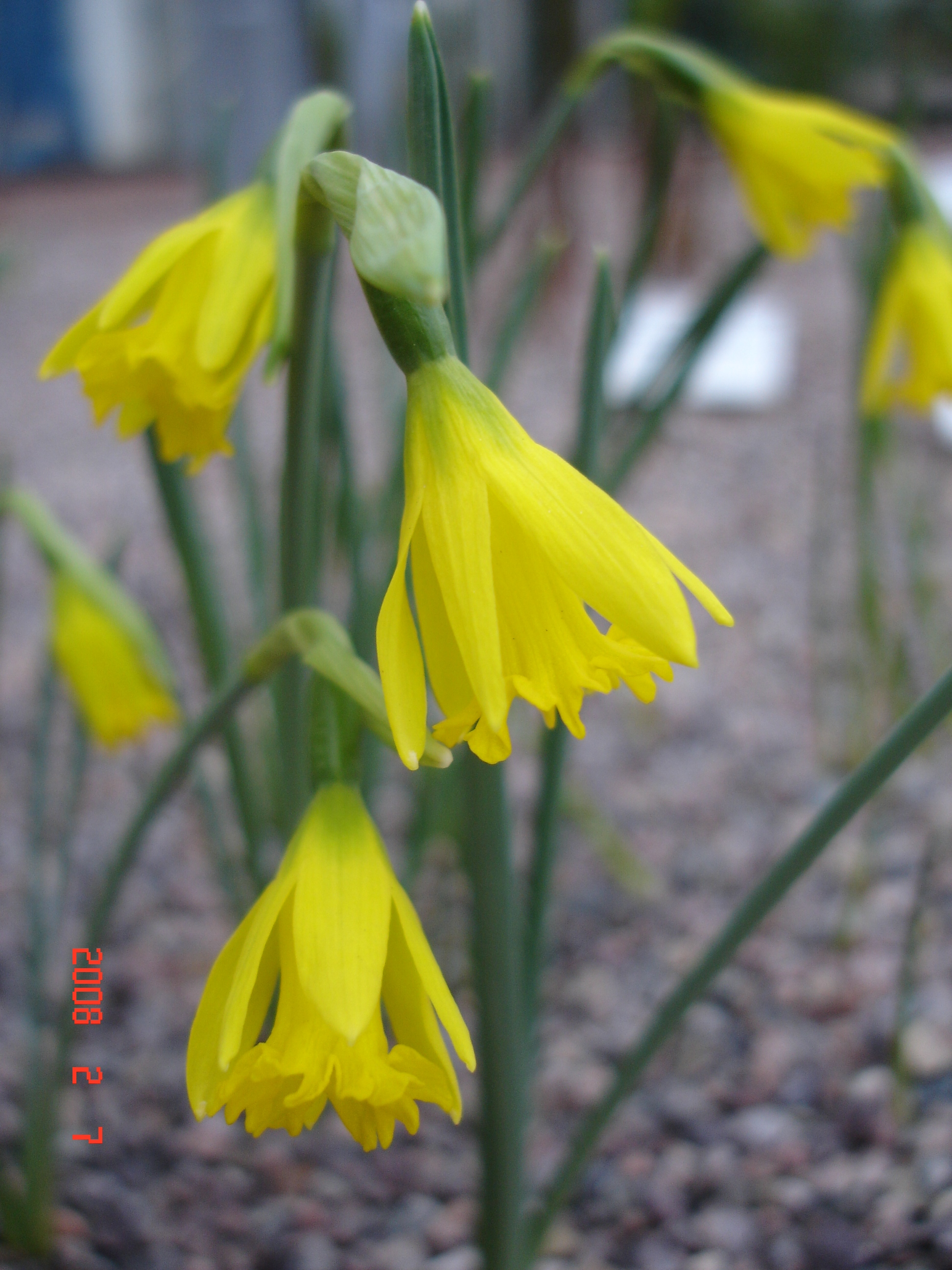

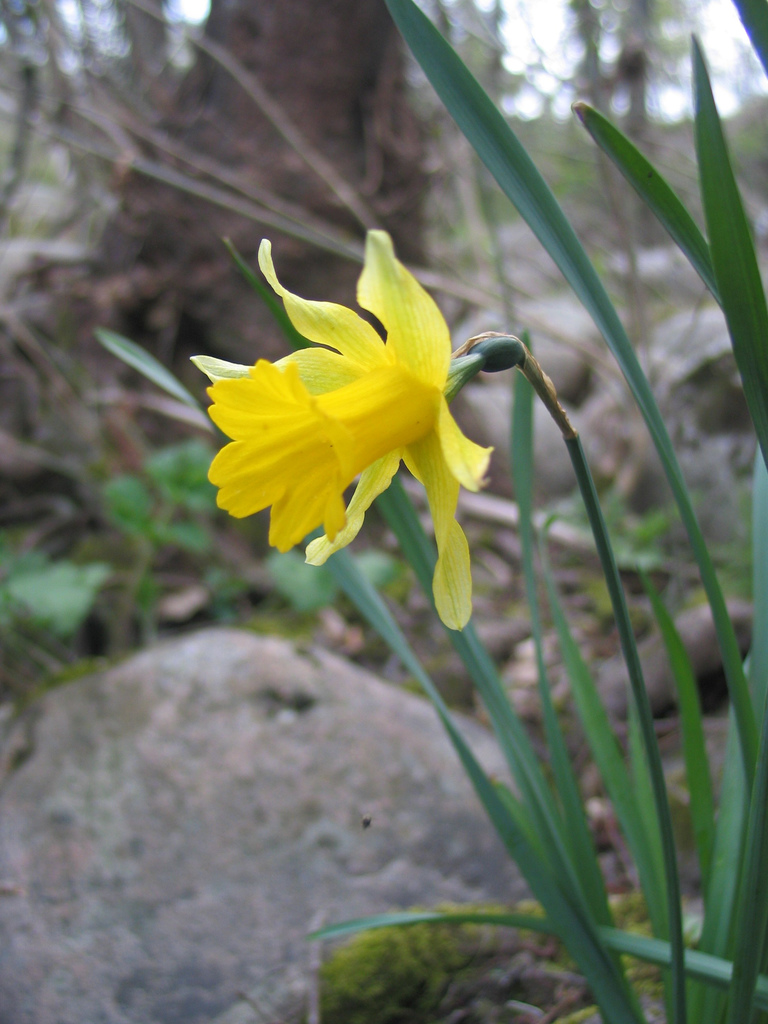

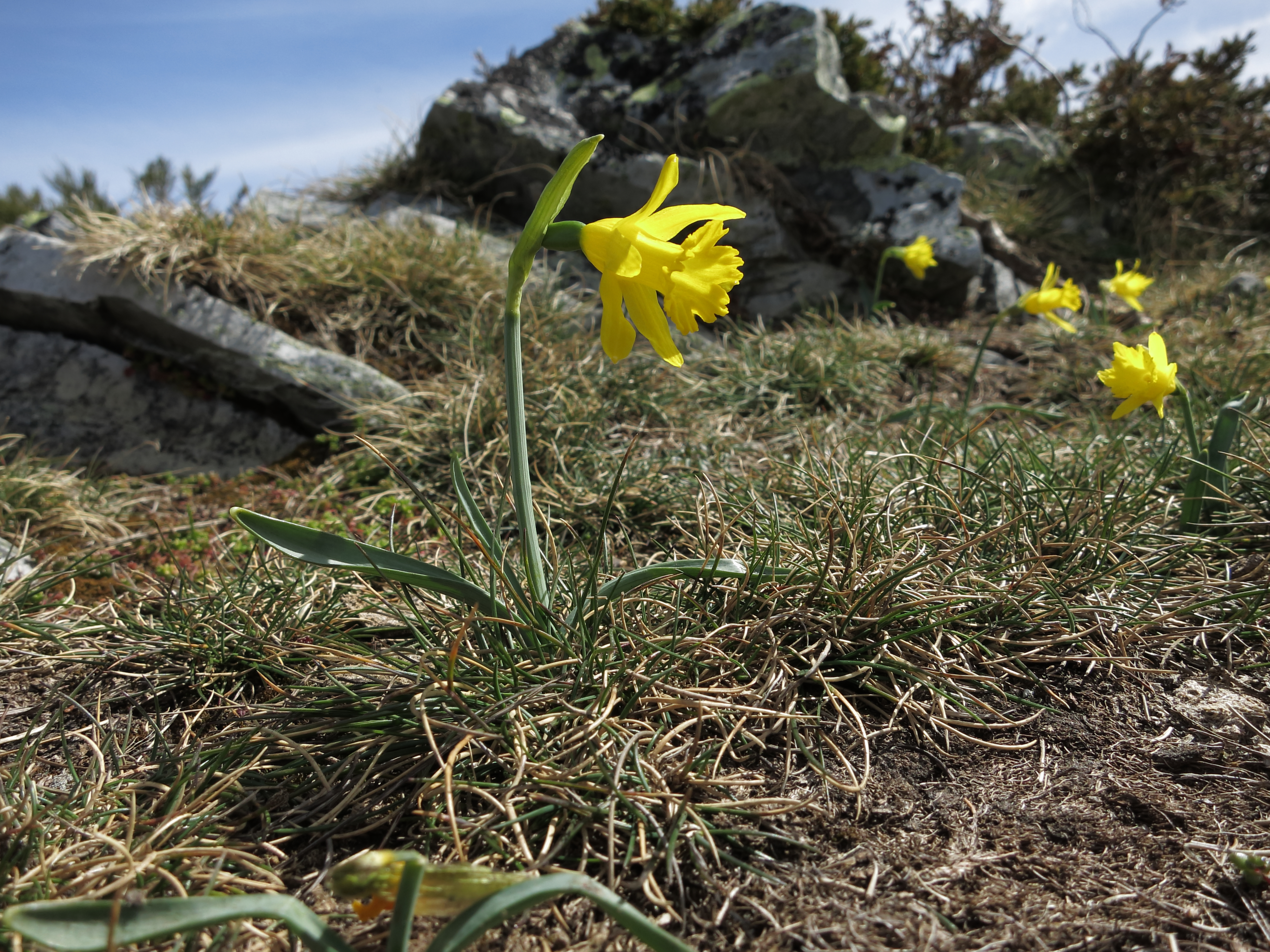
