= Renato Carosone =

Italian musician

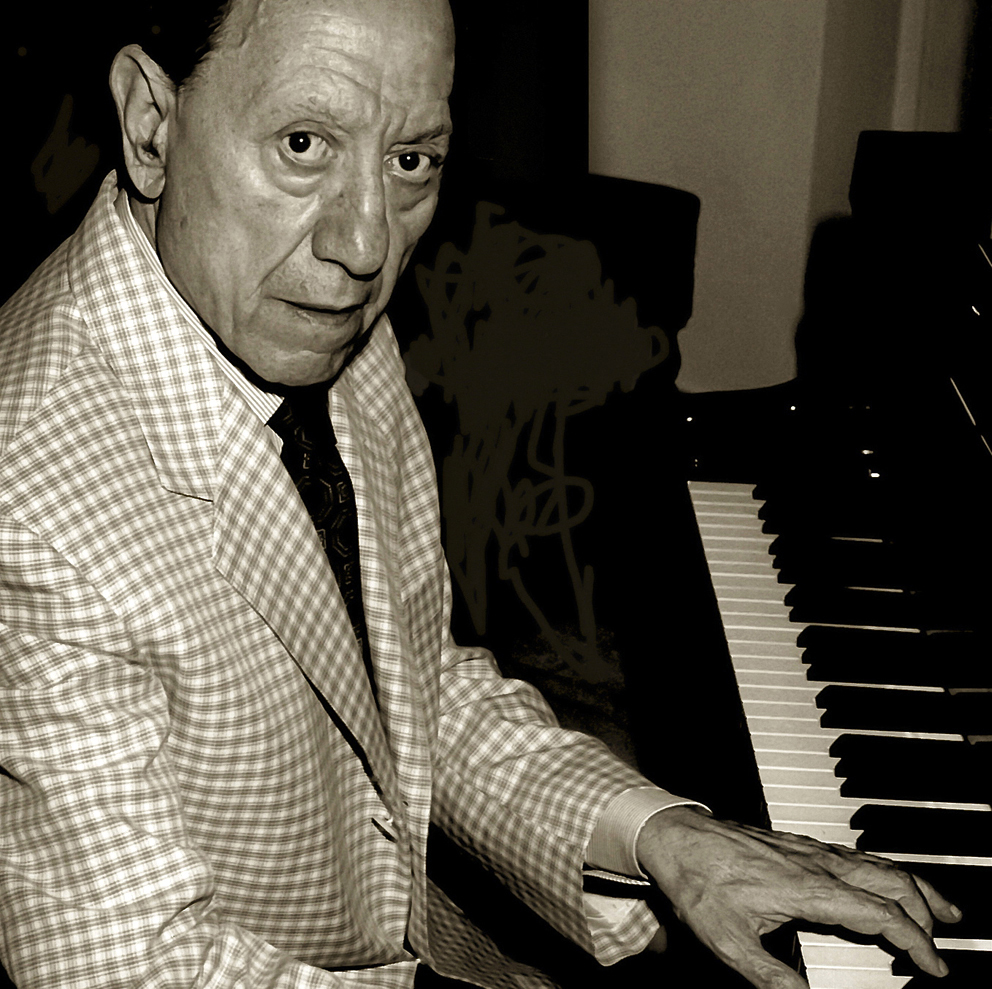
- Carosone in 1995

Background information
- Born: Renato Carusone; 3 January 1920; Naples, Kingdom of Italy
- Died: 20 May 2001 (aged 81) Rome, Italy
- Genres: Light music; Neapolitan song; jazz; swing; comedy pop; blues; cha-cha-cha; novelty
- Occupations: Singer; songwriter; pianist
- Instruments: Vocals; piano; accordion; ocarina
- Years active: 1935–2001
- Labels: Pathé; Stereo Dischi; Ri-Fi; Dischi Ricordi; RCA Italiana; Lettera A; Fonit Cetra; CBS; Capitol

Renato Carosone (Italian pronunciation: [reˈnaːto karoˈzoːne]; born Renato Carusone; 3 January 1920 – 20 May 2001) was an Italian musician.

Carosone was a piano prodigy and prominent figure in the Italian music scene in the second half of the 20th century. He was also a modern performer of the so-called canzone napoletana, a traditional music genre from Naples. His biggest successes were: "'O sarracino/Caravan petrol", "Tu vuò fà l'americano", "Maruzzella" and "Pigliate 'na pastiglia".

Carosone was one of the first post-war Italian artists (the other one being Domenico Modugno) who sold records and toured in the United States without singing in English.

== Biography ==
=== Beginnings ===
Carosone was born on 3 January 1920 in Naples, in Vico dei Tornieri, near Piazza Mercato, to Antonio and Carolina Daino, along with sister Olga and brother Ottavio. His father, who worked in the box office at Teatro Mercadante, encouraged him to pursue music. At 14, he wrote "Triki-trak", his first composition for piano, and in 1935, he was hired by an opera dei pupi puppet theater to play music to the battles of Count Roland and Renaud. Subsequently, he worked at E. A. Mario's publishing house teaching new songs to singers. He studied piano and composition at the Naples Conservatory under Alberto Curci, and obtained his diploma in 1937, when he was just 17.

A few months later he signed a contract with comedian Aldo Russo to perform as a band leader in Italian East Africa. The troup landed in Massawa, Eritrea, to work in a restaurant-theatre frequented by Italian workers. The act failed and after less than a week, Aldo Russo decided to dissolve the group and return to Naples. Carosone, however, decided to remain in East Africa, and he moved on to Asmara in the Eritrean highlands, playing piano in an orchestra at the Circolo Italia. There he met and fell in love with Venetian dancer Italia Levidi, known as Lita. The two married in Massawa on 2 January 1938. Carosone adopted her son Giuseppe, known as Pino, born to Lita five years before the wedding. Shortly thereafter, Carosone moved to Addis Ababa (now part of Ethiopia), where he spent a few months as conductor at the White Eagle. In June 1940, at the outbreak of World War II, he was called up and sent to the front in Italian Somaliland.

Following the surrender of the last regular Italian forces in the region in November 1941, Carosone returned to British-occupied Asmara, where his cousin Antonio was director of the Odeon Theatre. Carosone then became the musical director of the theater and the adjoining nightclub. He was a prominent figure of the local music scene, performing a combination of big-band music, Neapolitan songs and Eritrean percussive elements.

Carosone worked at the Odeon Club in Asmara, where he became a prominent figure of the local music scene, building his musical experience with a combination of big-band music (including American dance pieces, such as "Night and Day", "Begin the Beguine", "Blue Moon" and "Tea for Two"), Neapolitan songs and Eritrean percussive elements.

In July 1946, after the end of the war in Europe, he returned to Italy, to Brindisi, with his wife and son. Partially due to his long tenure abroad and inactivity caused by the war, Carosone was discovered to be virtually unknown in his home country. He started his career afresh, playing piano for small dance-hall bands. These new performances were strongly influenced by the new rhythms and music styles he had encountered during his ten years in East Africa and caught the attention of local promoters.

=== Success ===
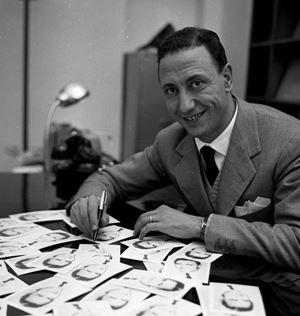
Renato Carosone in the fifties

In 1949 Carosone was asked to put together a band for a club's opening night. After some auditions, he signed the Dutch guitarist Peter van Houten and the Neapolitan drummer Gegè Di Giacomo and formed the Trio Carosone. The trio would later become a quartet with the addition of the Hungarian romani musician Elek Bacsik on bass, guitar and violin.

During the 1950s Carosone became more and more popular, his orchestra was in great demand both in Italy and abroad, and record sales were soaring high.

His song "Torero", entered the pop charts in the United States in the summer of 1958 where it peaked at #18, making it his only Top 20 hit song for his one-hit wonder in the United States. "Torero" was translated into twelve languages and covered by almost thirty artists in the United States alone, including versions by The Andrews Sisters, Connie Francis and The King Brothers. In 1957 Carosone and his band embarked on an American tour, kicking off in Cuba. This tour concluded with a triumphant performance at the prestigious Carnegie Hall in New York City.

Carosone was then signed by Capitol Records, which released his first two albums: Honeymoon in Rome (1957) and Renato Carosone! (1959). He then moved to Pathé and recorded Blue Italian Skies (1958). His fourth studio album, Carnevale Carosone (1960) was released by Parlophone.

=== Retirement ===
At the height of his career, Carosone announced his retirement from music in 1960. He felt that the advent of Rock and roll had the consequence of making his swing, big-band sound no longer popular: "I'd rather retire now on the crest of the wave, than being tormented later by the idea of rock and roll wiping away all that I have achieved in so many years of hard work". His decision to retire caused an uproar. Some observers even suspected obscure underworld threats. Away from the spotlight, Carosone turned to other interests, mainly painting. In 2007 the Castel Sant'Angelo Museum in Rome organized a large exhibition of his work.

=== Comeback ===
On 9 August 1975 Carosone made his comeback in a televised concert. He then resumed his musical career with live concerts, performances at the Sanremo Music Festival and TV appearances until the late 1990s.

== Repertoire ==
The majority of Carosone's songs were the result of his long and fruitful collaboration with the lyricist Nicola Salerno, who used the pseudonym Nisa. "'O suspiro", "Torero", "Tu vuò fà l'americano", "Mambo italiano", "Pigliate 'na pastiglia" and "'O sarracino/Caravan petrol" were among their greatest hits.

A few famous songs not co-written by Nisa were "...E la barca tornò sola" (a parody of a song performed by Gino Latilla at Sanremo Music Festival in 1954); "Tre numeri al lotto"; "Maruzzella" (dedicated to his wife); and "'O russo e 'a rossa"

== Death ==
Carosone died on 20 May 2001 at the age of 81 in Rome, Italy.

== Discography ==
- Honeymoon in Rome (1958)
- Blue Italian Skies (1958)
- Renato Carosone (1959)
- Carnevale Carosone (1960)
- Pianofortissimamente Carosone (1975)
- Sempre (1982)
- Nu' canzoncella doce doce (1982)

== See also ==
- Tu vuò fà l'americano
- We No Speak Americano
