= The Gypsy Queens =

French pop band

- Origin: Nice, France
- Genres: Pop
- Years active: 2007–present
- Labels: London Records; Universal
- Members: Didier Casnati; Joan Chavez; Liam Hornsby; Tyler Gasek; Geronimo Ribas
- Past members: Joseph Hamblin Boone; Miguel Bosch; Juan Francisco Rey Toro; Sam Houghton; Alberto Laurella; Manuel Polin; Jason King; Jay Metcalf; David Zincke; Anders Klunderud; Fred Novelli; Jack Kane; Jeremy Kola; Jeremy Trabucco; Miguel Bosch
- Website: gypsyqueens.com

The Gypsy Queens is an international pop band formed in Nice by Didier Casnati. They play a large repertoire of multi-lingual covers, with a rich vocal style likened to bands such as The Beach Boys or The Beatles.

Although the band successfully released albums in 2012 and 2014 they are first and foremost a performing band, typically playing at over 120 private events a year, and the pioneers of "roaming" or "strolling" type of performances. They were "discovered" by the likes of Sir Elton John and Nicolas Sarkozy and have been mainstays of the private party circuit of the rich and famous ever since. Founder Didier Casnati claims "we are the most famous band you have never heard of".

== History ==
=== 2007–2011: Formation and covers ===
In 2007, Italian singer Didier Casnati broke his duo with Philip Jones after seven years and formed The Gypsy Queens with another five members. The band play an international repertoire of acoustic pop cover versions, and all members sing, giving them a style which reviewers liken to The Beach Boys and The Beatles. They played the role of The Plastic People of the Universe in the Tom Stoppard play Rock 'n' Roll, from 26 September 2008, to 23 October 2008, in the Theatre National de Nice. In 2011, Casnati saw a decline in the local clientele of the band, and managed to get an article in an airline magazine in order to restore the business for the band in the south of France; that article led to signing with London Records and Universal Music Group.

=== 2012–present: Music releases and private party circuits ===
The band recorded The Gypsy Queens with record producer Larry Klein (who has worked with Joni Mitchell, Herbie Hancock and Madeleine Peyroux) in Los Angeles, California, in April 2012. The album includes the songs "L'Americano", "Aicha", "Ventura Highway" and "Marrakesh Express". It features vocals from Madeleine Peyroux, Graham Nash, Gerry Beckley and Dewey Bunnell, as well as piano by Booker T. Jones. The album was released 2 November 2012 and debuted at number 46 in the UK Albums Chart. Their second single "l'Italiano", featuring James Bond Casino Royale Actress Caterina Murino was an international success, achieving several million views on YouTube, in just a couple of weeks. They performed at Glastonbury Festival and Isle of Wight Festival.

After the success of their first album, the band recorded Lost in the Music (Sonico Productions Ltd). Produced by lead singer Didier Casnati, it was recorded in London's famous RAK Studios, and finalised in Los Angeles. The album includes the songs "Do you St. Tropez", "Losing myself in the music", "Sunny" and "Parole, Parole". It features vocals from Ben Taylor, and Hayley Westenra, and was mixed by multiple Grammy-winning sound engineer Helik Hadar. The band themselves describe the albums as an "expensive but necessary business card". In 2019, The Gypsy Queens performed for billionaire Harry Macklowe's wedding to Patricia Landeau and David Lee's wedding to Caroline Wozniacki

In February 2020, The Gypsy Queens recorded 2 singles with record producer Larry Klein at The Village in Los Angeles, "I'm into Something Good", featuring Herman's Hermits Peter Noone who originally made the song famous in 1965, and Buona Sera, as part as the Album "Reminiscing with friends" (Sonico Productions Ltd 2023). The cover of the single was photographed by iconic Photographer Marco Glaviano in Saint Barthélemy

In 2022, their single "L'Americano" was featured in the Netflix Movie "Love in the villa", directed by Mark Steven Johnson, and starring Kat Graham and Tom Hopper.

On 13 October 2023 The Gypsy Queens and Tony Danza released a video clip for the song "Buona Sera" with cameo appearances from Michele Hicks and Nadia Farès as well as Joe Gannascoli. The original story was written by John Patrick Shanley, it was shot in New York and Nice. The Video Clip was a huge success achieving over a Million views in just one week.

On 3 November 2023 the band released "Oh Me Oh My (I'm a Fool for You Baby)", a second single for their album "Reminiscing with Friends" with legendary singer Lulu. The song had been a major hit in 1969.

=== Studio albums ===
List of albums, with selected chart positions
Title	Album details	Peak chart positions	
Title	Album details	UK	SCO
The Gypsy Queens	Released: 2 November 2012; Format: CD, digital download; Label: London, Universal	46	50
Lost in the Music	Released: 23 June 2014; Format: CD, digital download; Label: London, Universal	—	—
Reminiscing with Friends	Released: 17 November 2023; Format: digital download; Label: Sonico, Absolute, Universal	—	—
"—" denotes releases that did not chart or were not released in that territory.

=== Singles ===
List of singles, with selected chart positions
Title	Year	Peak chart positions		Album
Title	Year	UK	SCO	Album
"L'Americano"	2012	53	50	The Gypsy Queens
"L'Italiano"	2013	—	—	The Gypsy Queens
"Do You Saint Tropez?" (featuring Hayley Westenra)	2014	—	—	Lost in the Music
"(I'm Into) Something Good" (featuring Peter Noone)	2021	—	—	Reminiscing with friends
"Buona sera" (featuring Tony Danza)	2023	—	—	Reminiscing with friends
"Oh me Oh my" (featuring Lulu)	2023	—	—	Reminiscing with friends
"—" denotes releases that did not chart or were not released in that territory.

== Members ==
- Didier Casnati – Lead vocals (2007–present)
- Joan Chavez – Double bass (2021–present)
- Tyler Gasek – Saxophone (2022–present)
- Liam Hornsby – Drums (2021–present)
- Geronimo Ribas – Guitar (2023–present)

Former members

- Patricio Bottcher Saxophone (2021–2022)
- Luca Fiorentini Guitar (2021–2023)
- Alberto Laurella – Double bass (2018–2020)
- Sam Houghton – Saxophone (2018–2020)
- Juan Francisco Rey Toro – Drums (2018–2020)
- Joseph Hamblin Boone – Guitar (2018–2020)
- Manuel Polin – Drums (2007–2017)
- Jason King – Double bass (2007–2014)
- Jay Metcalf – Saxophone (2007–2014)
- David Zincke – Guitar (2007–2010)
- Anders Klunderud – Guitar (2010–2017)
- Fred Novelli – Double bass (2014–2018)
- Jack Kane – Saxophone (2014–2018)
- Jeremy Kola – Guitar (2017–2018)
- Jeremy Trabucco – Drums (2017–2018)
- Miguel Bosch – Guitar (2018)

Timeline

== Awards and nominations ==
2016	Estrella de Oro Excelencia Professional	Won
