= The Gypsy Queens (album) =

Studio album by The Gypsy Queens
- Released: November 2, 2012
- Recorded: 2011–12
- Genre: Pop
- Label: London Records, Universal Music

The Gypsy Queens is the debut studio album by five-piece band, The Gypsy Queens. It was released in the United Kingdom on the November 2, 2012. The album entered the UK Albums Chart at number 46.

== Background ==
Following signing their record deal with London Records (Universal Music) they recorded their debut album with the legendary producer Larry Klein (who has worked with Joni Mitchell, Herbie Hancock and Madeleine Peyroux) in Los Angeles in April 2012. The album features songs such as L'Americano, Aicha, Ventura Highway and Marrakesh Express as well as vocals from Madeleine Peyroux, Graham Nash (Crosby Stills and Nash), Gerry Beckley, Dewey Bunnell and Pianist Booker T.

== Track listing ==
No.	Title	Length
1.	"L'Americano" (feat. Madeleine Peyroux)	1:57
2.	"Ventura Highway" (feat. Booker T, Jones, Gerry Beckley & Dewey Bunnell)	3:46
3.	"Aicha"	3:49
4.	"Sympathique"	2:48
5.	"Marrakesh Express" (feat. Graham Nash)	2:44
6.	"L'Italiano"	3:24
7.	"Malagueña"	3:21
8.	"El Cuarto de Tula"	2:53
9.	"Volare"	2:26
10.	"Country Roads"	2:41

== Chart performance ==
Chart (2012)	Peak position
UK Albums Chart	46

== Release history ==
Region	Date	Format	Label
United Kingdom	November 2, 2012	Digital download	London Records, Universal Music
United Kingdom	December 10, 2012	CD	London Records, Universal Music
