= Patrizio Buanne =

Italian opera singer

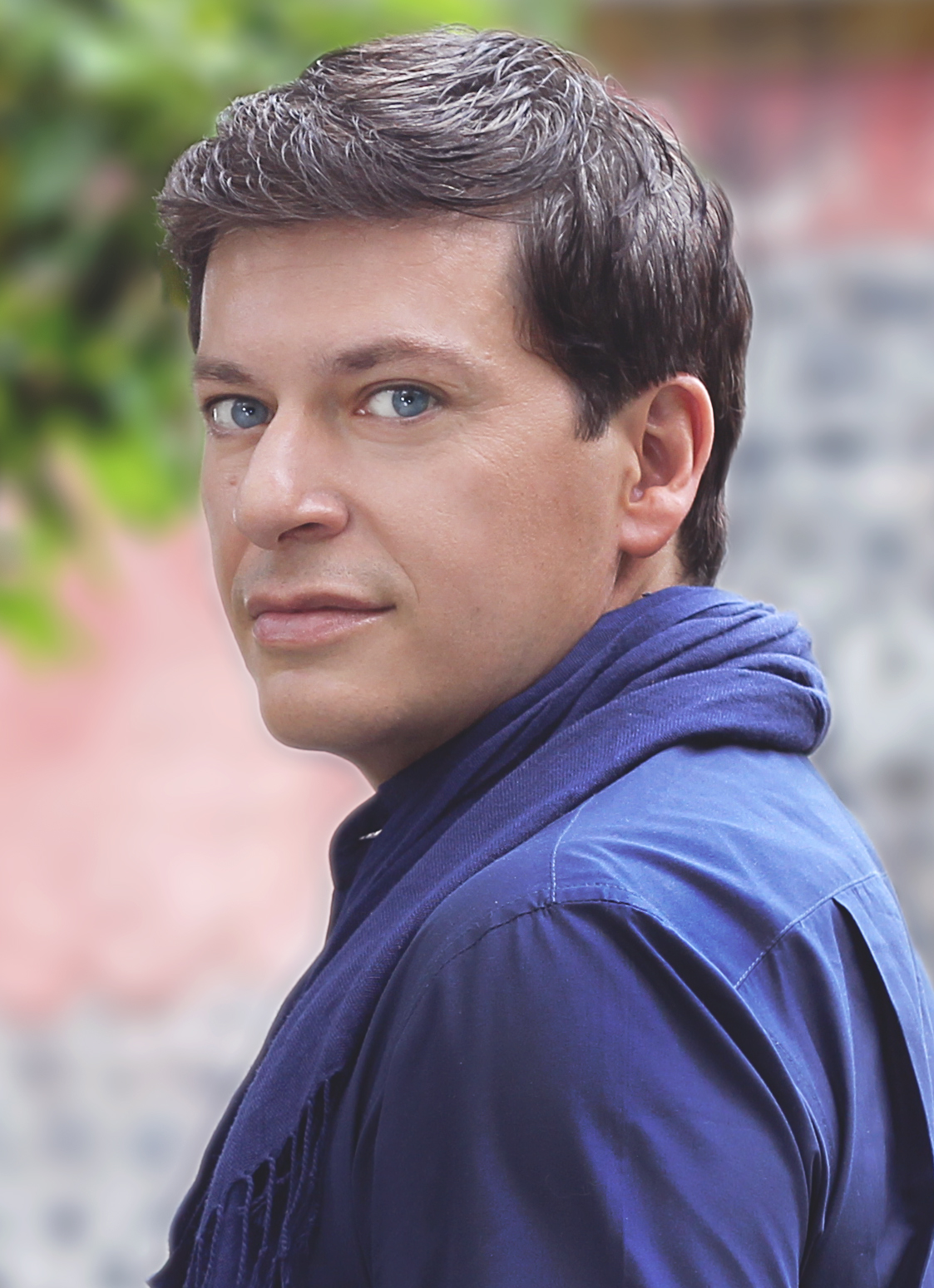

Background information
- Born: Patrizio Franco Buanne; 20 September 1978 (age 48); Vienna, Austria
- Origin: Vienna and Naples
- Genres: Adult contemporary; pop; oldies
- Occupation: Singer
- Instruments: Vocals; guitar
- Years active: 1991–present
- Labels: Universal; Warner Music; SME
- Website: facebook.com/patriziobuanneofficial

Patrizio Franco Buanne (born 20 September 1978) is an Italian-Austrian baritone singer, songwriter, and producer. Buanne has recorded songs in Neapolitan, English, Italian, Spanish, French, German, Polish, Afrikaans, Japanese and Mandarin.

== Early life ==
Patrizio Buanne was born in Vienna, Austria to Franco and Alina Buanne; he spent his childhood living and traveling between Vienna and Naples, Italy, which he says shaped his upbringing and personality.

From an early age, a passion for languages grew on him. He studied Roman and Slavic languages at the University of Vienna and Rome. He speaks Neapolitan, Italian, German, English, French, Spanish and Polish; furthermore, he developed an affection for music, inspired by the classic Italian and Neapolitan songs that his parents would record from vinyl onto cassettes to be played for the clients at his father's restaurant.

He is married with a daughter who currently resides in Austria. His daughter's name is Alina Josephine.

== Career ==
Buanne participated and won several talent competitions between the ages of 11 and 17. which led to small musical productions and gigs with his self-formed '50s rock and roll band and as a solo performer followed.

When he was 17, a music industry manager proposed a performance on the occasion of the Papal visit in Wroclaw, Poland. The song, which was half in Italian and half in Polish, had been written for the opening Mass, and with 85,000 people in attendance, the exposure led to his first record named Angelo di Dio in 1997. It was also to be the year that his father died from virulent cancer, and the subsequent grief became such that Patrizio almost lost his own life to a perforated ulcer.

At age 19, Buanne graduated from school in Vienna and moved to Naples and later Rome. There he attended university to study languages, while looking for opportunities in the entertainment industry in Italy. He was a guest performer and entertainer on Italian television shows such as Momenti di Gloria, Domenica In and Libero. This success led to a contract with a production company that made shows for RAI and Mediaset. Due to the limited offered international opportunities in Italy, Buanne started to shape his own ideas and concepts.

Buanne approached several producers with the idea of recording a collection of romantic Italian songs with an orchestra, which was his real ambition, forged by 5 years of shaping and developing his ideas as an independent artist. The objective behind recording that particular genre was, on one hand, to let people know that "Italian music is not just opera or classical", and on the other hand, to honor his father.

=== The Italian (2005) ===
In 2004, after years of reaching out to producers, he finally found a team that shared his goals, started to produce his album, and auditioned for several record companies, until he was signed by Lucian Grainge from Universal Music for a worldwide release. The album, The Italian, was finished in London at the Abbey Road Studios with the collaboration of the Royal Philharmonic Orchestra. Released in February 2005, after 18 months of production, it reached the top ten in the charts in the United Kingdom, and sold over 100,000 copies by the first week following its release. The album was certified gold in the UK, Austria and Finland, platinum in New Zealand, Hong Kong, Singapore, Malaysia, Thailand and Taiwan, double platinum in South Africa and even triple platinum in Australia.

Following The Italian's international release, Buanne performed two major tours in 2006, including a six-week tour of theatres and concert venues in Australia, Asia, South Africa and Europe.

His live concert DVD Patrizio: The New Voice of Romance was broadcast on the American public television network PBS, which led to his first US tour.

In October 2006, Buanne was invited by Dr. A. Kenneth Ciongoli, the chairman of the National Italian American Foundation, to perform at their annual gala in Washington, D.C., where he met the President of the United States.

=== Forever Begins Tonight (2007) ===
Buanne's second album, Forever Begins Tonight, was released in 2007, and reached No. 15 in the UK and No. 7 on the US Billboard World Albums Chart. The album included an Italian version of the Robbie Williams's song "Angels" (entitled "Un Angelo").

In less than two years, both of his releases, sold more than 2 million albums, even in spite of not having professional management or an international radio hit.

=== Patrizio (2009) ===
Given the significant success that came with both of his first albums, as well as the demand for his music in the United States by his fans, he decided that in order to take his career to the next level, he would need to spend more time in the US not only touring, but also to seek representation from some serious players within the music establishment; and thus, Mondo Buanne Productions was founded; a group of professionals around the world that consult and coordinate Patrizio's concepts, ideas and projects.

Taking this step in his career, brought the recording of Patrizio's third album, under the Warner Music label; collaborating with veteran producers, Humberto Gatica and Brian Rawlings, both of whom oversought many international hits by artists like Michael Jackson, Celine Dion, Cher and Enrique Iglesias, and recognized Patrizio's potential and were enthusiastic to be involved in his new release.

For this album, Gatica and Rawlings helped researching more tunes of the Italian songbook, that are Patrizio's trademark; but the album also featured his own contemporary and timeless interpretation of International standards, alongside new original and unpublished compositions, recorded this time in the United States, at the legendary Hollywood's Capitol Studios.

In 2011, on Buanne's birthday, this eponymous album made it to number 5 on the US Billboard Jazz charts, and was followed by his third concert tour, through Australia, New Zealand, Asia, South Africa and the United States, where he was invited to perform with Larry King and on Late Night with Jimmy Fallon.

=== Life Is Beautiful: Dankie Suid-Afrika (2011) ===
That same year, he released Life Is Beautiful: Dankie Suid-Afrika (Universal-EMI Music), an album of South African pop standards, in which he recorded alongside singers such as Ladysmith Black Mambazo, duets in Afrikaans; as well as in Italian and English. He was awarded with the "SA's Ambassadors Award" by the South African Music Industry.

=== Wunderbar (2013) ===
In 2013, Patrizio dedicated an album to his German speaking fans, and particularly friends that he grew up with in Vienna, named Wunderbar (Warner Music GSA); it includes more Italian songs he grew up with, and original compositions combining the German and Italian languages.

The results of both Life Is Beautiful: Dankie Suid-Afrika and Wunderbar were a tour through Austria, Switzerland and Germany, presented by popular show master Florian Silbereisen; and national concerts in South Africa, as well as a special guest performance and live DVD recording as the only international performer at "Classics Is Groot", singing among other songs his first hit "Il Mondo", and where he invited 12 years old Dutch soprano Amira Willighagen to perform the Neapolitan classic "'O sole mio" as a duet.

=== Viva la Dolce Vita (2015) ===
On his fourth worldwide release, Viva la Dolce Vita (Universal Music), he interpreted Neapolitan, Sicilian and more Italian standards such as "Gli occhi miei" ("Help Yourself") by Tom Jones, and Charlie Chaplin's "Smile" in Italian.

=== Bravo Patrizio (2016) ===
During his worldwide promotion of Viva la Dolce Vita, his team assured him the interest of more concerts not just through the United States, but also confirming national tours in 2016 and 2017 in Australia, South Africa, Europe, Latin America and Asia; presenting Patrizio with an award for worldwide multi-platinum sales and a release of the most popular songs of his first 10 years compiled in one CD, named Bravo Patrizio (Universal Music).

=== Italianissimo (2017) ===
While working on his first Spanish-language album, planning for a 2017 release, his first single, "Me Enamoré", was released and promoted as the main theme for the Mexican soap opera El Vuelo de la Victoria. His album Italianissimo was released in February 2018. The songs he recorded for this album include "Ti Amo", "Su di noi", "Bella notte/Non dimenticar"; and "Volare".

=== Christmas with Patrizio Buanne (2020) ===
When asked if he would release a Christmas album, Buanne jokingly responded: "probably when I will get married and become a father". After getting married and becoming a father, he released a Christmas album, Christmas with Patrizio Buanne, in 2020.

=== Celebration! Live in South Africa DVD (2021) ===
In 2021, Buanne released the DVD Celebration! Live in South Africa including his greatest hits recorded live from a sold-out performance at the Sun Arena in Pretoria, South Africa in 2019. It also features songs from his album Christmas with Patrizio Buanne.

== Discography ==
=== Studio albums ===
List of studio albums, with selected chart positions and certifications
Title	Album details	Peak chart positions							Certifications
Title	Album details	AUS	AUT	FIN	NZ	UK	US Jazz	US World	Certifications
The Italian / Il Mondo	Released: 2005; Label: Universal Music TV, SME; Formats: CD, digital download	3	8	11	2	10	—	5	ARIA: 2× Platinum; BPI: Gold
Forever Begins Tonight	Released: October 2006; Label: Universal Music TV; Formats: CD, digital download	7	6	18	21	15	—	7	ARIA: Gold; BPI: Silver
Patrizio	Released: 2009; Label: Warner Music; Formats: CD, digital download	17	—	—	4	—	5	—	ARIA: Gold
Wunderbar	Released: 2012; Label: Warner Music,TELDEC; Formats: CD, digital download	—	27	—	—	—	—	—	
Viva la Dolce Vita	Released: April 2015; Label: Decca, Universal Music Australia; Formats: CD, digital download	33	—	—	—	—	—	—	
Italianissimo	Released: May 2016; Label: Decca, Universal Music Australia; Formats: CD, digital download	26	—	—	—	—	—	—	
Christmas with Patrizio Buanne	Released: 6 November 2020; Label: Sony Music; Formats: CD, digital download	—	—	—	—	—	—	—	
NapoLatino	Released: 24 October 2025; Label: Sony Music; Formats: CD, digital download	—	—	—	—	—	—	—	

=== Compilation albums ===
List of compilation albums, with selected chart positions and certifications
Title	Album details	Peak chart positions
Title	Album details	AUS
The Best of Bravo Patrizio	Released: July 2009; Label: Decca (5320638); Formats: CD, digital download	60
Bravo Patrizio	Released: May 2016; Label: Decca, Universal Music Australia; Formats: CD, digital download	45
