= Mobiles (band) =

English new wave and synth-pop band

- Origin: Eastbourne, East Sussex
- Genres: Synth-pop; new wave
- Years active: 1981–1984
- Labels: Rialto; RCA
- Past members: Anna Maria; Chris Downton; Russ Madge; David Blundell; Eddie Smithson; John Smithson

Mobiles were an English new wave and synth-pop band, formed in 1981 in Eastbourne, East Sussex. They enjoyed a brief period of chart success when their song "Drowning in Berlin" reached the top 10 of the UK singles chart in early 1982.

== Career ==
Formed in 1981, Mobiles were based in Eastbourne, though some band members hailed from nearby Bexhill-on-Sea and Hastings. Fronted by vocalist Anna Maria, other members included, Chris Downton (guitars), Russ Madge (lead guitars), brothers Eddie Smithson (drums) and John Smithson (keyboards/synthesizers) and David Blundell (bass guitar). Shortly after their formation, they were signed by Rialto Records, owned by Nick and Tim Heath, sons of British bandleader Ted Heath.

They are best known for their debut single, "Drowning in Berlin", which was initially issued in December 1981. The song's lyrics focus on the then-ongoing Cold War, set against a dark synth-pop backing. The song also contains a section which features an interpolation of "The Loveliest Night of the Year", the Irving Aaronson song adapted from the 1888 waltz "Sobre las olas" by Juventino Rosas. It received radio airplay in the UK, eventually spending two months in the Top 40, peaking at number nine in early February 1982.

The band were never able to reach the Top 40 again, with the follow-up single, "Amour, Amour" stalling at number 45 in early April 1982. Despite critical acclaim, their debut album, Mobiles, did not chart, nor did any of their four subsequent singles (including a 1983 cover version of the Foundations' "Build Me Up Buttercup"), after which the Heath brothers shut down the Rialto label.

After a brief hiatus, Mobiles returned in 1984 as a duo, comprising Russ Madge and Anna Maria, backed by members of Sad Café, Bucks Fizz, and Swans Way. MCA Records released the single "Lost Without Your Love" on its Panther Records imprint, but it also failed to chart, and plans for a proposed second album were discontinued.

Mobiles finally disbanded in 1984. Madge and Maria continued to work together in another short-lived band called the Avengers, releasing one more single on the Panther label in late 1984. The Smithson brothers later worked with Jason Bonham, in the 1990s.

In 2006, a compilation album entitled The Best of Mobiles: Drowning in Berlin was issued by Cherry Red Records, featuring all seven singles and all tracks from their eponymous debut album, as well as several B-sides, remixes and extended versions as bonus tracks.

== Band members ==
- Anna Maria – lead vocals
- Russ Madge – electric guitar
- John Smithson – keyboards
- Eddie Smithson – drums
- Chris Downton – electric guitar
- David Blundell – bass guitar

== Discography ==
=== Albums ===
- Mobiles (1982, Rialto Records)
- The Best of Mobiles: Drowning in Berlin (2006, Cherry Red)

=== Singles ===
| Year | Song | UK |
|---|---|---|
| 1981 | "Drowning in Berlin" (b/w "Tiptoe in Paradise") | 9 |
| 1982 | "Amour Amour" (b/w "Skeleton Dance") | 45 |
| 1982 | "Partners in Fiction" (b/w "Snow Man") | — |
| 1982 | "You're Not Alone" (b/w "Struth") | — |
| 1983 | "Build Me Up Buttercup" (b/w "Don't Pay the Axeman") | — |
| 1983 | "Fear" (b/w "Longtime") | — |
| 1984 | "Lost Without Your Love" (b/w "Remember") | — |
"—" denotes releases that did not chart.
