= Over the Waves =

Over the Waves may refer to:

- "Over the Waves", or "Sobre las olas", an 1888 waltz by Juventino Rosas
- Over the Waves (film), a 1950 Mexican film
- "Over the Waves", an unreleased 1969 song by the Beach Boys
