= Cesare Antoniolli =

Italian composer

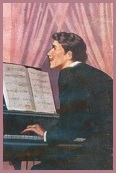

Cesare Antoniolli was an Italian composer, arranger and orchestral director of popular music active during the 1900-1960 period. He composed music alongside notable lyricists, arranged music for major publishers, and directed his own orchestra backing popular singing stars on their recordings.
The orchestra was variously nominated as Orchestra Antoniolli, Orchestra da Ballo Antoniolli, Orchestra Melodica Napoletana Antoniolli and Orchestra Tropical Antoniolli. He played an important creative part in the survival (during the Depression and war years) and subsequent post-war rebirth, of Italy's popular music scene.

== Creative works ==
Cesare Antoniolli composed music for popular songs of the era alongside noted lyricists Danpa (Dante Panzuti) and Renzo Dolci. In October 1945, just a few months following the end of the war, a public concert was held for the people of Milan in the large Teatro del Popolo inside the city's pride and joy, the Castello Sforzesco (AD1360) that had been severely damaged by an allied bombing campaign in 1943. The concert organized by the new government agency Ente Nazionale Assistenza Lavoratori (ENAL) (meaning National Entity of Assistance for Workers) included the announcement and performance by the winners of a popular songwriting competition, the first of its kind in post-war Italy to capture the hearts of the nation (until the outset of the Sanremo Festival in January 1951 and the Festival di Napoli in 1952). Cesare Antoniolli and Renzo Dolci won first prize in the second category (rhythmic songs) of the national song competition with their song "Dice Quella Lettera" ('the letter says'). One of Antoniolli and Danpa's songs "Il Paradiso Dei Baci" ('the paradise of kisses') was performed at the second Festival di Zurigo (Il Festivale Della Canzone Italiana in Svizzera) in September 1958. It was sung by singing star Fiorella Bini, accompanied by the orchestra of Eros Sciorilli and recorded on Cetra Records.

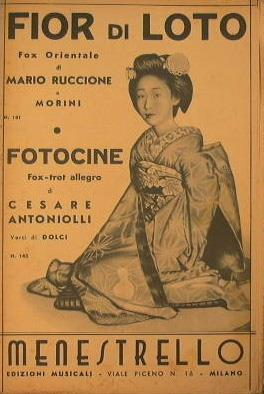
"Fotocine" by Antoniolli / Dolci 1940

=== Compositions ===
- In Val Gardena (C'e Un Trenin) Antoniolli/Danpa, Swing-Moderato, Panagini
- La Maestrina Dalla Penne Rossa Antoniolli/Danpa, Slow, Panagini 1955
- IL Pendolino Antoniolli/Danpa, Moderato, Panagini 1957
- Una Voce Nella Sera Antoniolli/Danpa, Slow, Chillin 1951
- A Fior Di Labbra Antoniolli/Danpa, Valzer-Lento, VIS-Radio 1956
- Fotocine Antoniolli/Dolci, Foxtrot-Allegro, Menestrello 1940
- Dice Quella Lettera Antoniolli/Dolci 1945
- Amarsi In Silenzio Antoniolli/Dolci, Euterpe 1946
- Il Paradiso Dei Baci Antoniolli/Danpa, Valzer Lento, 1951
- Forza Piola! Antoniolli/Danpa, Mazurka Ranchera, Panagini 1952
- Fa Molto Capri Antoniolli/Antoniolli, Swing-Moderato, Chillin 1952

=== Film Score ===
In 1955 Cesare Antoniolli collaborated with renowned animation artist Gino Gavioli (9 May 1923 - 19 November 2016) who had formed with his brother Roberto the Gamma Film company in (1953-1999) that produced animated films in Milan, most famously the Carosello series. Cesare was asked to compose the soundtrack for a short animation film called "La Pentola Miracolosa" ('the miraculous pot') that presented a fable regarding the virtues of long hard work and worthy causes, as opposed to becoming rich overnight. Its synopsis describes: the story of a carver who, saving as much as possible from the proceeds of the sale of his wooden toys, dreams of one day being able to buy a huge organ. The 35mm color film of 13m:13s (364 metres in length) carries a beautifully orchestrated soundtrack (including a choir arrangement) evidence of Cesares musical abilities and experience gained not-least from the previous 10 years of popular music development post-war. The film was registered for copyright on 7 December 1955 and an official document issued in Rome on 30 April 1960 now archived by the Italia Taglia Project. In 1956 it was presented at the 17th La Biennale Festival of Venice (International Cinematographic Arts Exhibition) in the Children's Section.

== Publishing ==
Cesare Antoniolli created both music and arrangements for popular songs with prominent publishers Edizioni Panagini (Novara), Edizioni Leonardi (Milan), Edizioni Musicali Chillin (Turin), Edizioni Musicali Menestrello (Milan), Redi Edizioni Musicali (Milano), VIS-Radio (Naples) and Edizioni Musicali Euterpe (Genoa). Apart from the small selection of arrangements of cover songs listed below, he created arrangements of his own compositions and a working library for his orchestra, from simple piano/vocal sheets to full popular orchestra scores.

On several occasions he worked alongside composer Gino Redi (of Redi Edizioni Musicali and Redi/Ponti/De Laurentis publishing) most notably scoring the arrangement for the Redi/Galdieri song "T'ho Voluto Bene" sung by Flo Sandon's in the 1951 film 'Anna'. The song was later translated into English and made a world-wide hit as "Non Dimenticar" by Nat King Cole in 1958.

=== Arrangements ===
- Pusilleco 'Nsentimento G. Cioffi/DeLutio, Fox-Moderato, Leonardi 1949
- Famme Durmi' Panzuti/Danpa, Swing, Leonardi 1951
- Ricordi?...(il Primo Ballo) Alvaro/Alvaro, Slow, Style-Leonardi 1951
- Un'Altra Sigaretta Alvaro/Colombi, Beguine-Lento, Style-Leonardi 1951
- Non Sparate...(Nel Pianista) Alvaro/Testoni, Canzone-Swing, Style-Leonardi
- E Passa Un Altro Giorno! D'Arena/Marena/Volpi, Slow, Style-Leonardi
- Cancello Chiuso Redi/Bertini, Canzone-Beguine, Redi 1951
- T'ho Voluto Bene (Non Dimenticar) Redi/Galdieri, Canzone Slow, RPD 1951

== Recordings ==
Cesare Antoniolli's orchestral work includes accompaniment and direction of recordings with singers Teddy Reno, Lello Perrelli, Tati Casoni, Gigi Marra and Serafino Bimbo. These were produced by record companies Durium Records, Compagnia Generale del Disco (CGD) and Cetra Records. Research conducted on the internet has uncovered images of a total thirty-five record labels printed with Antoniolli's name between 1930 and 1952 in this capacity. The instrumentation of popular music orchestras of the period included piano, double-bass, drum kit, a small brass and woodwind section, accordion, a small string section, percussion and acoustic guitar. And for larger live concert performances and recording sessions a female and/or male vocal duo or trio were added. In 1948, barely in singer Teddy Reno's first year in Milano (and having just founded the CGD record company at the age of 22), Cesare Antoniolli's dance orchestra accompanied him on a recording of the Frank Sinatra hit song "Day By Day" (Cahn/Stordahl/Weston). The song was translated into Italian as "Oggi O Mai" ('today or never') by renowned lyricist Ardo (Matteo Treppiedi), who also translated singer Serafino Bimbo's Italian version of "La Raspa" (Grant/Nisa) backed by Orchestra Antoniolli in 1949.

Cesare recorded eight songs in Latin-American/Cuban styles with singer Tati Casoni, the only time his name on record labels included his initial. Recorded on the Cetra label some of the songs were translated by prominent lyricists Giacomo Mario Gili (pseudo. Larici) (1906-1996), Enzo Luigi Poletto (1906-1983), Testoni and Panzeri. His ensemble was called Orchestra Tropical C. Antoniolli and the songs recorded in Torino in October 1950 and January 1951, immediately following the period when Tati Casoni had toured several times to South America. Neopolitan singing star Lello Perrelli recorded at least eighteen songs in his local dialect with the Orchestra Melodica Napoletana Antoniolli. They were all produced on the CGD Blue label and are by far the largest group of Cesare Antoniolli's work rediscovered in the course of this research.

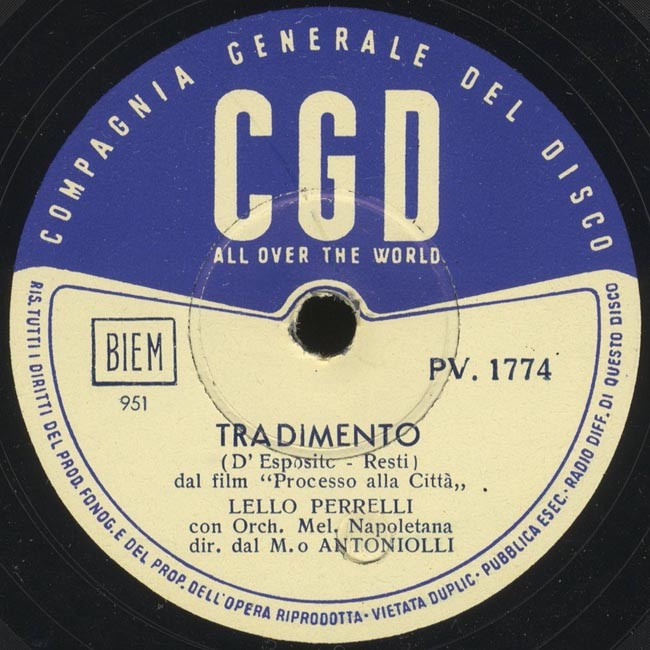
"Tradimento" Lello Perrelli with Orchestra Melodica Napoletana Antoniolli

=== Orchestra Melodica Napoletana directed by Maestro Antoniolli, sung by Lello Perrelli ===
- Tradimento D'Esposito/Resti, CGD Blue 1930
- Peccato Cunfessato Barzizza/Manilo, CGD Blue
- 'A Riggina D' 'E Tarantelle Giannini/Raul, CGD Blue 1948
- 'E Campane Napulitane D'Esposito/Nisa, CGD Blue
- Maria E' Robba Mia Capodanno/Trusiano, CGD Blue
- Cara Lucia Mazzocco/Murolo, CGD Blue
- Sciummo Concina/Bonagura, CGD Blue
- 'O Principe Indiano Vincenzo Emilio/Barille, CGD Blue
- Tuppe Ttu' Giuliani/Rotondella, CGD Blue
- Sarta 'E Biancheria Napolitano/Rendine, CGD Blue
- Margellina Bonagura/Bonagura, CGD Blue
- Nustalgia Bonagura/Bonagura, CGD Blue
- Core 'Ngrato (Catari, Catari) Cardillo/Cordiferro, CGD Blue
- Passione Bovio/Valente/Tagliaferri, CGD Blue
- So' Nnammurato 'E Te Falcomata/Manilo, CGD 1952
- Mandulino Napulitano Rossi/Nisa, CGD 1952
- Surriento D' 'E Nnamurate Bonagura/Benedetto, CGD 1952
- Nu Quarto 'E Luna Oliviero/Manlio, CGD 1952

=== Orchestra Antoniolli, sung by Teddy Reno ===
- Vorrei Piangere Mascheroni/Mascheroni, Slow, CGD Red
- Amarti Con Gli Occhi Rossi/Colombi, Valzer-Lento, CGD Red
- Ti Ho Scritto Tante Volte Ceragioli/Testoni, SlowMod., CGD Red 1948
- Donde Vas Brigada/Pinchi, Foxtrot, CGD Red

=== Orchestra Antoniolli, sung by Serafino Bimbo ===
- La Raspa Grant/Nisa/Ardo, Raspa, CGD Red 1949

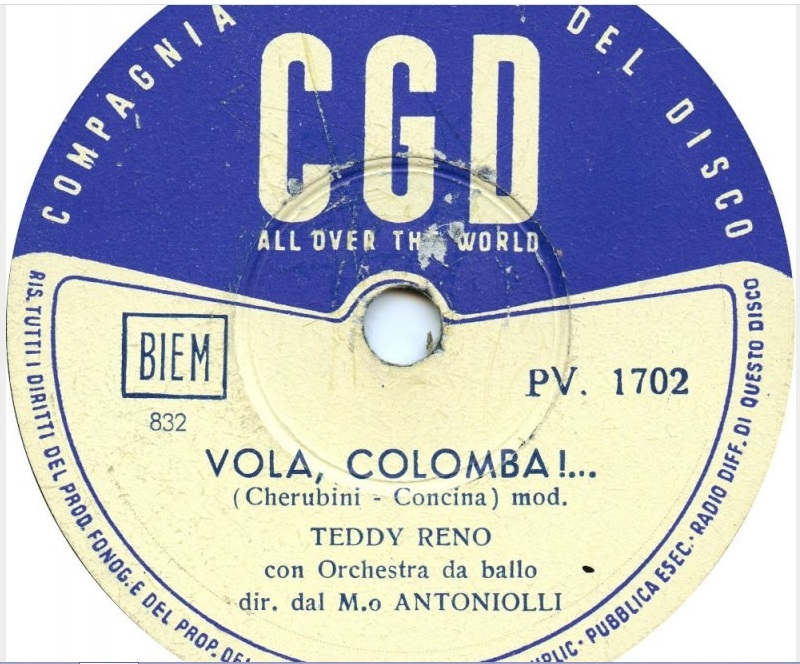
"Vola, Colomba!..." Teddy Reno with Orchestra da Ballo Antoniolli

=== Dance Orchestra directed by Maestro Antoniolli, sung by Teddy Reno ===
- Vola, Colomba!... Cherubini/Concina, Moderato, CGD Blue 1952
- Ninna, Nanna (Ai Sogni Perduti) Testoni/Panzeri/Bassi, Canzone-Beguine, CGD Blue 1952
- Aggio Perduto O Suonno Redi/Natili, Canzone-Slow, CGD Red 1952
- Oggi O Mai (Day By Day, Sinatra 1946) Cahn/Stordahl/Weston/Ardo, Slow-Moderato, CGD Red 1948
- Addio Vetturino C.A.Rossi/Capece, Canzone-Slow, CGD Blue

=== Orchestra directed by Maestro Antoniolli, sung by Tati Casoni ===
- Buona Notte, Angelo Mio MacGillar/Danpa/Pallesi, Slow, Leonardi/Durium 1946
- Brasilena Redi/Nisa, Fox-Rumba, Durium 1946
- Cantando Con Le Lacrime Agli Occhi Panzeri/Mascheroni, Slow-Fox, Melodi/Durium 1946
- Male D'Amore D'Anzi/D'Amico, Durium 1947
- Non Ho Piu...La Veste A Fiori Blu D'Anzi/D'Amico, Durium 1947
- Basta Un Po' Di Swing Panzuti/Danpa, Durium 1947

=== Orchestra Tropical directed by Maestro C.Antoniolli, sung by Tati Casoni ===
- "Un Poquito" Del Tuo Amor Gutierrez/Larici, Bolero-Mambo, Cetra 14 Oct.1950
- La Mucura (La Secchia) Fuentes/Poletto, Canzone Guaracha, Cetra 14 Oct.1950
- Dolcissimo Mambo Morato/Testoni-Panzeri, Bolero-Mambo, Cetra 14 Oct.1950
- Madrid Lara/Larici-Testoni, Bolero, Cetra 14 Oct.1950
- Un Miracolo Lecuona/Poletto, Bolero-Beguine, Cetra 17 Jan.1951
- Contigo Estrada-Baez, Bolero, Cetra 17 Jan.1951
- Adios Mariquita Linda Jimenes/Jimenes, Bolero, Cetra 17 Jan.1951
- Ti Amo (Cuatros Vidas) Carreras/Jarver/Poletto, Bolero, Cetra 17 Jan.1951

=== Orchestra directed by Maestro Antoniolli, sung by Gigi Marra ===
- Forza Piola! Antoniolli/Danpa, Mazurka Ranchera, Panagini 1952

=== Orchestra directed by Eros Sciorilli, sung by Fiorella Bini ===
- iL Paradiso Dei Baci Antoniolli/Danpa, Valzer-Lento, Cetra 1951 (performed at Festival di Zurigo, Sept.1958)

== Media coverage ==
In the renowned Italian publication 'Musica, Rassegna Della Vita Musicale Italiana' (Review of Italian Musical Life) later called Musica e dischi, Cesare Antoniolli's work as composer and orchestral director was mentioned six times in articles and advertisements between 1945 and 1952. These mentions alone cover twenty-six songs produced in the period, beginning with an article describing the
Castello Sforzesco concert on the front page of its first edition published in October 1945.

== Capri Island ==
A 1952 song for which Cesare Antoniolli had written both words and music "Fa Molto Capri" ('its very Capri') was rediscovered in 2010, re-recorded and inducted into a historical archive of poetry and songs on the Italian island of Capri. Its lyrics suggest how visitors
should dress and behave while in Capri in order to be fashionable and trendy. The archive was produced in the form of a hard-cover book "Capri Dei Sognatori" ('the Capri of dreamers') by Neopolitan writer/musicians Vincenzo Faiella and Sergio Vellino
