= One for the Boys (album) =

Studio album by Connie Francis
- Released: 2023
- Recorded: August 20 – 22, 1959; August 26, 1959
- Genre: Pop
- Length: 39:58
- Label: MGM Records scheduled as E-3815 (mono)/SE-3815 (stereo)
- Producer: Ray Ellis, Norman Newell

Connie Francis chronology
| Connie Francis Sings Fun Songs for Children (1959) | One for the Boys (Unreleased) | Connie Francis Sings Spanish and Latin American Favorites (1960) |

One for the Boys is a studio album recorded by American entertainer Connie Francis in 1959. It remained unreleased until 14 April 2023 when it was available for streaming on iTunes.

== Overview ==
The album follows the concept of a tribute to the great crooners of the 1950s and their most famous hits. Between August 20, 1959 and August 26, 1959, Francis recorded the following songs at EMI's legendary Abbey Road Studios in London:

- "April Love" (Pat Boone)
- "Because of You" (Tony Bennett)
- "Cry" (Johnnie Ray)
- "It's Not for Me to Say" (Johnny Mathis)
- "Prisoner of Love" (Perry Como)
- "Temptation" (Bing Crosby)
- "That's My Desire" (Frankie Laine)
- "Thinking of You" (Eddie Fisher)
- "Too Young" (Nat King Cole)
- "Where the Blue of the Night" (Bing Crosby)
- "You Made Me Love You" (Al Jolson)
- "Young at Heart" (Frank Sinatra)

The album was scheduled for release in early 1960 as MGM Records 12" Album SE-3815 (stereo) and E-3815 (mono), but the overwhelming success of Francis' first Italian album, Connie Francis Sings Italian Favorites, led to the cancellation of One for the Boys in favor of three further albums containing Spanish and Latin American Favorites, Jewish Favorites, and a second volume of Italian Favorites. The project of a follow-up album to celebrate the female stars of the era, One for the Girls, was abandoned and never recorded.

The originally intended track listing of One for the Boys is unknown, but three songs from the album – "Because of You", "You Made Me Love You", and "Young at Heart" – were released in late 1960 in Great Britain on EP along with the theme song from Francis' first motion picture Where the Boys Are. Otherwise the album's songs remained unreleased until 1993.

== Track listing ==
1. "Because of You" (Arthur Hammerstein, Dudley Wilkinson) - 3:19
2. "You Made Me Love You (I Didn't Want to Do It)" (Joseph McCarthy, James V. Monaco) - 4:15
3. "Young at Heart" (Carolyn Leigh, Johnny Richards) - 3:34
4. "Too Young" (Sylvia Dee, Sidney Lippman) - 2:56
5. "April Love" (Paul Francis Webster, Sammy Fain) - 4:01
6. "Temptation" (Nacio Herb Brown, Arthur Freed) - 2:23
7. "Prisoner of Love" (Russ Columbo, Clarence Gaskill, Leo Robin) - 3:36
8. "It's Not for Me to Say" (Robert Allen, Al Stillman) - 3:16
9. "Thinking of You" (Bert Kalmar, Harry Ruby) - 2:54
10. "That's My Desire" (Helmey Kressa, Carroll Loveday) - 3:22
11. "Where the Blue of the Night (Meets the Gold of the Day)" (Bing Crosby, Fred E. Ahlert, Roy Turk) - 2:57
12. "Cry" (Churchill Kohlman, Alex Rybeck) - 3:25
