= Connie Francis Sings Irish Favorites =

Connie Francis sings Irish Favorites

Studio album by Connie Francis
- Released: March 1962
- Recorded: January 25 and 26, 1962
- Genre: Pop
- Label: MGM; E-4013 (mono)/SE-4013 (stereo)
- Producer: Danny Davis

Connie Francis chronology
Connie Francis sings Folk Song Favorites (1961)	Connie Francis sings Irish Favorites (1962)	Do The Twist!/Dance Party (1962)

Connie Francis sings Irish Favorites is a studio album recorded by U. S. Entertainer Connie Francis.

== Background ==
After the success of her 1959 album Connie Francis sings Italian Favorites (which remained on the album charts for 81 weeks and peaked at # 4), Francis decided to release more albums that appealed to immigrants in the United States. In 1960, she had released one album each of Spanish and Latin American Favorites, Jewish Favorites, and More Italian Favorites, followed by Folk Favorites in 1961.

Connie Francis sings Irish Favorites was the sixth installment in this series of "Favorites", which would produce two more albums featuring German Favorites and Great Country Favorites, both in 1964, the latter being a duet album with Hank Williams, jr.

The album was recorded during two sessions on January 25 and 26, 1962 at St. Patrick's Cathedral in New York City under the musical direction of Don Costa and Joe Mele.

== Track listing ==
=== Side A ===
#	Title	Songwriter	Length
1.	"McNamara's Band"	Red Latham, Wamp Carlson, Guy Bonham, Connie Francis	2.13
2.	"Mother Machree"	Ernest R. Ball, Rida Johnson Young, Chauncey Olcott	2.24
3.	"My Wild Irish Rose"	Chauncey Olcott	2.00
4.	"Dear Old Donegal"	Chauncey Olcott	1.48
5.	"Did Your Mother Come From Ireland"	Michael Karr, Jimmy Kennedy	2.05
6.	"Danny Boy"	Frederic Weatherly	3.25

=== Side B ===
#	Title	Songwriter	Length
1.	"It's a Great Day for the Irish"	Roger Edens	1.45
2.	"Too-ra-loo-ra-loo-ral (That's An Irish Lullaby)"	James Royce Shannon	2.13
3.	"How Can You Buy Killarney"	Freddie Grundland, Hamilton Kennedy, Gerald Morrison, Ted Steels	2.02
4.	"How Are Things in Glocca Morra?"	Burton Lane, E. Y. Harburg	2.55
5.	"When Irish Eyes Are Smiling"	Chauncey Olcott, George Graff	2.33
6.	"A Little Bit Of Heaven"	Ernest R. Ball, J. Keirn Brennan	2.55

=== Unreleased songs from the sessions ===
#	Title	Songwriter	Length	Remark
1.	"When Johnny Comes Marching Home"	Patrick Gilmore	1.46	unreleased until 1996
