= Arrivederci, Roma (album) =

Studio album by Jerry Vale
- Released: January 1963
- Genre: Traditional pop
- Length: 36:34
- Labels: Columbia; CS-8755/CL-1955
- Producer: Robert Morgan

Jerry Vale chronology
I Have But One Heart (1962)	Arrivederci, Roma (1963)	The Language of Love (1963)

Arrivederci, Roma subtitled More Great Italian Love Songs is a studio album by American singer and actor Jerry Vale released in early 1963 by Columbia Records. The album consists mainly of traditional pop Italian standards across 12 tracks. The album was a commercial success and reached No. 34 on both the Billboard chart and Cashbox chart.

== Critical reception ==
The album received a positive critical reception upon its release. Cashbox in its album reviews stated that Vale "comes up with a strong second stanzato his" previous albu, adding that the chanter's warm, rich voice carries him in good stead," with the conclusion of editors that it's a "...top-notch session on Columbia." Billboard awarded the album a four-star rating to indicate sales potential.

Reissued in 2002 in a two-fer CD by Collectables Records alongside I Have But One Heart (1962) by Vale, Al Campbell from AllMusic described the both albums as "[capturing] Vale's beautiful renditions of romantic Italian love songs sung in his high tenor voice" with each containing "great sound quality to boot". Later publications such as The Hollywood Reporter credited Vale as a revivalist of Italian love songs and said he "showcased his love" for them with Arrivederci, Roma.

== Chart performance and singles ==
Arrivederci, Roma followed up I Have But One Heart with similar-to-better chart success. The album debuted on Billboard magazine's Top LP's chart in the issue dated February 23, 1932, peaking at No. 34 during a twenty-five-week run on the chart. It entered Cashbox magazine's Top 100 Monaural Albums chart on February 16, 1963, peaking also at No. 34 during its fifteen-week stay on it.

== Track listing ==
Side one
No.	Title	Writer(s)	Length
1.	"Volare (Nel Blu Dipinto Di Blu)"	Domenico Modugno; Franco Migliacci; Mitchell Parish	3:10
2.	"Pescatore 'e Pusilleco"	Ernesto Murolo; Ernesto Tagliaferri	2:52
3.	"Summertime in Venice"	Icini; Carl Sigman; Pinchi	2:50
4.	"You're Breaking My Heart"	Pat Genaro; Sunny Skylar	3:03
5.	"Al Di La"	Carlo Donida; Ervin Drake; Mogol	3:13
6.	"Santa Lucia (Me And Maria)"	Al Frisch; Charles Tobias	3:00
Total length:			18:08

Side two
No.	Title	Writer(s)	Length
1.	"Arrivederci Roma"	Carl Sigman; Pietro Garinei; Renato Rascel; Sandro Giovannini	3:05
2.	"Luna Rossa"	Antonio Vian; Kurt Goell; Vincenzo De Crescenzo	3:05
3.	"Anema e core"	Harry Akst; Mann Curtis; Salve D'Esposito; Tito Manlio	3:07
4.	"From the Bottom of My Heart"	Danny Di Minno; Gino Cardini	2:47
5.	"Non Dimenticar"	Michele Galdieri; Gino Redi; Sam Dobbins	3:40
6.	"Ciao, Ciao, Bambina"	Domenico Modugno; Dino Verde; Mitchell Parish	2:42
Total length:			18:26

== Charts ==
Chart peaks for Arrivederci, Roma
Chart (1963)	Peak position
US Billboard Top LP's	34
US Cashbox Top 100 Monaural Albums	34

== Personnel ==
All credits are adapted from the liner notes of Arrivederci, Roma.

- Jerry Vale – lead vocals
- Glen Osser – arranger, conductor
- Robert Morgan – producer
- Henry Parker – photography
