= Chitarra romana =

1934 Italian song

"Chitarra romana" (lit. "Roman Guitar") is a 1934 Italian folk song composed by Bruno Cherubini (the brother of Bixio Cherubini) and Eldo Di Lazzaro.

== Background ==
First published as sheet music in 1934, the song was first recorded in 1935 by Carlo Buti. The song is part of a 1930s trend which in deference to the fascist rhetoric of the time tended to magnify the image and history of Rome. The song mixes lyrical and folk components, and echoes some elements of the 1926 successful song "Barcarolo romano".

== Cover versions ==
The song was later covered by numerous artists, including Luciano Pavarotti, Claudio Villa, Giuseppe Di Stefano, José Carreras, Sergio Franchi, Plácido Domingo, Jerry Vale, Alfio, Lou Monte, Alfie Boe, Joni James, Bobby Solo, Rosanna Fratello, Bob Benny, Eino Grön, Reijo Taipale, Kari Tapio, Tino Rossi, Gabriella Ferri, Lando Fiorini. The song was sampled in 2000 by American rapper Amil in the song "Heard It All" and in 2002 by British rapper Ms. Dynamite in the song "It Takes More".

== Connie Francis version ==
"Roman Guitar (Chitarra romana)"

Single by Connie Francis

from the album More Italian Favorites
- B-side: "Aiutami a piangere"
- Released: 1961
- Genre: Easy Listening

Connie Francis singles chronology
"Capatosta Sweet" (1961)	"Roman Guitar (Chitarra romana)" (1961)	"Un volo di gabbiani" (1961)

Connie Francis, an American-Italian herself, recorded 2 Italian albums by 1961, Connie Francis Sings Italian Favorites and More Italian Favorites, both of which were really successful, reaching No. 4 and No. 9 on the charts respectively. In 1961 she released a single from the latter album, "Roman Guitar" with the B-side "Aiutami a piangere". Both songs reached No. 3 in Italy, and to this day it was her most successful Italian release. After it she had a string of more well charting songs.
