= The Scene Changes =

The Scene Changes may refer to:

- The Scene Changes (Bud Powell album), 1959 album by Bud Powell
- The Scene Changes (Perry Como album), 1965 album by Perry Como
