= Around the World (1956 song) =

Song
- Written: 1956
- Published: 1956
- Songwriters: Harold Adamson, Victor Young

"Around the World" is the theme tune from the 1956 movie Around the World in 80 Days. In the film, only an instrumental version of the song appeared, although the vocal version has become the better known one. The song was written by Harold Adamson and Victor Young; Young died in 1956, several weeks after the film's release, and he received the Academy Award for Best Music, Scoring of a Dramatic or Comedy Picture posthumously. Young's orchestral version was a #13 hit on the Billboard charts in 1957. The recording by Bing Crosby was the B-side of the Victor Young version in 1957, on Festival SP45-1274 in Australia, and was a joint charting success.

== Recorded versions ==
The song has been recorded by, among others:

- Karen Akers
- John Arpin
- Nora Aunor
- Brook Benton (on the album "Endlessly" - 1959)
- Stanley Black
- Liam Burrows
- Alvin and the Chipmunks - in a speeded-up version for their song The Chipmunk Song (Christmas Don't Be Late) (1958).
- The Chordettes - for their album Never on Sunday (1962).
- Nat King Cole - recorded August 8, 1957.
- Frank Sinatra - included in his album Come Fly with Me (1958)
- The Columbia Ballroom Orchestra
- Ray Conniff - included in the EP Ray Conniff Around the World (1963).
- Sam Cooke - included in his album Sam Cooke (1958)
- Bing Crosby (Billboard top hit (#25) in 1957, No. 5 hit in UK)
- Gracie Fields (No. 8 hit in UK)
- Eddie Fisher - a 1956 single release.
- Connie Francis - included in her album Connie Francis Sings "Never on Sunday" (1961).
- Buddy Greco - a single release in 1963.
- Ronnie Hilton (No. 4 hit in UK)
- Harry James
- Joni James - included in the album 100 Strings & Joni in Hollywood (1961).
- Jonah Jones
- James Last
- Steve Lawrence - for his album Winners! (1963)
- Brenda Lee - for her album Emotions (1961)
- The Mantovani Orchestra (Billboard top hit (#12) in 1957, No. 20 hit in UK)
- The McGuire Sisters
- Bette Midler for the live album "Live At Last" (1977).
- Matt Monro - included in his album From Hollywood with Love (1964).
- Jane Morgan and The Troubadours - included in her album Fascination (1957).
- Emile Pandolfi
- André Prévin
- Louis Prima
- George Sanders
- Calum Scott for the soundtrack of the Hulu miniseries, ‘’Four Weddings and a Funeral’’. (2019)
- The Shirelles
- Frank Sinatra, in Come Fly with Me 1958 Capitol LP, arr & cond Billy May
- Kay Starr - in her album Movin'! (1959).
- The Supremes - a 1965 recording included in the expanded CD version of There's a Place for Us (2004)
- Paul Sullivan
- The Sundowners
- Billy Vaughn
- Bobby Vinton - for his album Drive-In Movie Time (1965).
- Lawrence Welk and his Orchestra (The Lennon Sisters sang it on "The Lawrence Welk Show".)

== Popular culture ==
The Buddy Greco recording was the first piece of music heard in the first episode of the 2012 television series Pan Am.

The song is used multiple times in various forms throughout the 2015 Japanese animated film The Anthem of the Heart.

The song is featured prominently in season 2, episode 6 of The Marvelous Mrs. Maisel.
