= The Loveliest Night of the Year =

Waltz song

Single by Mario Lanza
- A-side: "Be My Love"
- Released: June 14, 1951
- Recorded: 1951
- Genre: Traditional pop
- Length: 3:35
- Label: RCA Victor

Mario Lanza singles chronology
"Vesti La Giubba" / "Ave Maria" (1951)	"The Loveliest Night of the Year" (1951)	"Because" / "For You Alone" (1951)

"The Loveliest Night of the Year" is a popular song.

The music was first published as a waltz called "Sobre las olas" ("Over the Waves") in 1888, written by Juventino P. Rosas. In 1950, the music was adapted by Irving Aaronson with lyrics by Paul Francis Webster for the movie The Great Caruso, in which it was sung by Ann Blyth. Later, Mario Lanza recorded the song. It became one of the most popular songs of 1951, reaching number three in the US Billboard Chart. Lanza received his second gold disc for this song.

In the UK, the song was popular based on sales of sheet music. The song was also associated with Anne Shelton, whose contemporary recording was available alongside Lanza's.

The instrumental version of the song is often associated with magicians performing their "magical tricks", and flying trapeze acts, with whom it is often played in the background, especially in animated cartoons. It is so commonly associated with these entertainments as to be iconic, although few people know the music by name. In this fashion a snatch of the song featured on the single "Drowning in Berlin", a no.9 UK hit for The Mobiles in 1982.

== Other film appearances ==
- 1936 - The Beloved Vagabond

== Other recordings ==
- 1950 - Helen O'Connell
- 1951 - Ann Blyth
- 1954 - Vera Lynn
- 1960 - Connie Francis for her album More Italian Favorites
- 1962 - Bing Crosby - included in his album On the Happy Side
- 1962 - Keely Smith for her album Because You're Mine
- 1967- Paulo Diniz adapted the song in Portuguese with the title "Seria Bom"
- 2008 - Alfio for his album Classic Rewinds, which pays tribute to Mario Lanza and 14 other popular Italian-American singers
