= More Italian Favorites =

Studio album by Connie Francis
- Released: October 1960
- Genre: Vocal
- Length: 35:44
- Labels: MGM; E3871

Connie Francis chronology
Connie Francis Sings Jewish Favorites (1960)	More Italian Favorites (1960)	Songs to a Swinging Band (1961)

Professional ratings
Review scores
Source	Rating
Encyclopedia of Popular Music	3/5 stars
Billboard	Positive (Spotlight LP)
Cashbox	Positive (Popular Pick)
Music Vendor	Positive (LP Pick of the Week)

More Italian Favorites is the thirteenth album by Connie Francis and was released in October 1960 by MGM Records.

After the success of her first Italian album in 1959, she recorded more "Favorites" albums, in 1960 she recorded a second Italian Favorites album, featuring more standards. The orchestra was arranged and conducted by Tony Osborne.

== Reception ==
Cashbox said that "Having triumphed with the 1st such package, Connie Francis follows up with another lineup of Italian-American songs. Here she’s heard in 'Guaglione,' 'Just Say I Love Him,' 'That’s Amore,' 'Torero,' and 'Funiculi Funicula.' And called it a "Sure chart item."

Billboard similarly stated that "Connie Francis' first Italian LP was smash and this should be a similar click. The thrush is in fine, expressive vocal form-singing in both English and Italian - on 'Funiculi, Funicula,' 'Torero,' 'That's Amore,' "Senza Mamma,' etc."

Record World (then known as Music Vendor) said that Francis "...returns with an encore of songs devoted to new and familiar Italian songs. Repertoire includes 'Just Say I Love Him,' 'Torero,' 'That's Amore', and 'Senza Mamma', to which she wrote English words." The magazine believed that it "Should be well received by both adult and teen fandom."

== Chart performance ==
The album debuted on Billboard magazine's Best-Selling Stereophonic Albums chart in the issue dated December 11, 1960, peaking at No. 9 during a twenty-week run on the chart. The album debuted on Cashbox magazine's Top 100 Albums chart in the issue dated November 19, 1960, peaking at No. 39 during a three-week run on the chart.

== Track listing ==
=== Side A ===
1. "Guaglione" (Giuseppe Fanciulli, Nicola Salerno)
2. "Senza Mamma E 'Nnaumurata"
3. "Just Say I Love Him" ( Rodolfo Falvo, Jack Val, Jimmy Dale, Enzo Fusco, Martin Kalmanoff, Sam Ward)
4. "Funiculì, Funiculà" (Luigi Denza, Peppino Turco)
5. "Summertime in Venice"
6. "Roman Guitar (Chitarra romana)"

=== Side B ===
1. "Torero"
2. "Nights of Splendor"
3. "Tell Me You're Mine" (Ronald L. Fredianelli, Dico Vasin)
4. "That's Amore" (Harry Warren, Jack Brooks)
5. "Return to Me" (Carmen Lombardo, Danny Di Minno)
6. "The Loveliest Night of the Year" (Juventino Rosas)

== Chart positions ==
Chart peaks for More Italian Favorites
Chart (1960)	Peak position
US Billboard Best-Selling Stereophonic Albums	9
US Cashbox Top 100 Albums (Monoraul)	39
