= Olé ala Lee! =

Olé ala Lee

Studio album by Peggy Lee
- Released: February 1961
- Recorded: June 16, 23, 24, 1960
- Studio: Capitol (Hollywood)
- Genre: Jazz, Latin jazz
- Length: 26:54
- Label: Capitol
- Producer: Dave Cavanaugh

Peggy Lee chronology
Christmas Carousel (1960)	Olé ala Lee (1961)	Basin Street East Proudly Presents Miss Peggy Lee (1961)

Professional ratings
Review scores
Source	Rating
AllMusic	3/5 stars

Olé ala Lee is a 1961 album by Peggy Lee that was arranged by Joe Harnell.

== Track listing ==
1. "Come Dance with Me" (Sammy Cahn, Jimmy Van Heusen) – 2:28
2. "By Myself" (Howard Dietz, Arthur Schwartz) – 3:20
3. "You're So Right for Me" (Jay Livingston, Ray Evans) – 1:47
4. "Just Squeeze Me (But Please Don't Tease Me)" (Duke Ellington, Lee Gaines) – 1:54
5. "Fantástico" (Jack Keller, Noel Sherman) – 2:05
6. "Together (Wherever We Go)" (Jule Styne, Stephen Sondheim) – 1:46
7. "Love and Marriage" (Cahn, Van Heusen) – 2:07
8. "Non Dimenticar" (Shelley Dobbins, Michele Galdieri, Gino Redi) – 2:26
9. "From Now On" (Cole Porter) – 1:55
10. "You Stepped Out of a Dream" (Nacio Herb Brown, Gus Kahn) – 2:30
11. "Olé" (Peggy Lee) – 2:26
12. "I Can't Resist You" (Ned Meyer, Will Donaldson) – 2:10

== Personnel ==
- Peggy Lee – vocals
- Joe Harnell – arranger, conductor
