= El Negro Zumbón =

Song written by Armando Trovajoli

"El Negro Zumbón" (also known as "Anna") is a baião song written by Armando Trovajoli in 1951 for the film Anna, directed by Alberto Lattuada and starring Silvana Mangano.

In the movie, the song is performed in a night club scene by Mangano, although she is lip syncing. The lyrics are actually sung by Flo Sandon's.

After the U.S. release of Anna in 1953, the Brazilian beat of "El Negro Zumbón" influenced American Pop music. It has also been recorded by many Latin American artists.

== Notable recordings and versions ==
- Pérez Prado (1950s)
- Amália Rodrigues (1953)
- Caterina Valente with Silvio Francesco (1956)
- Abbe Lane with Tito Puente (1957)
- Edmundo Ros (1960s) - Mambo no.5
- Connie Francis (1961)
- Billy Mure Tough Strings (1961)
- Gene Ammons (1963)
- Bob Crewe (1967)
- Juan García Esquivel
- Chet Atkins (1967)
- Imca Marina (1988)
- Regina Do Santos (1995)
- Pink Martini (2004) - vocals by China Forbes, Timothy Nishimoto, and Dan Faehnle
- Nojazz (2005)
- Haruomi Hosono (2017)

== Posterity ==
A clip of the film Anna, featuring the song, is included in the 1988 movie Cinema Paradiso.

In Caro diario (1993), Nanni Moretti dances to a clip of the song broadcast on a TV set.

The Avalanches used a performance of the song by George Barnes at the end of their track "Frontier Psychiatrist", from their 2000 album Since I Left You.

The song can also be heard in the background of a diner in Martin Scorsese's The Irishman.

== Notes ==
- IMDb, as well as the Pink Martini liner notes, credit the music to Roman Vatro - one of the multiple alternate names of Armando Trovajoli - and the lyrics to Francesco Giordano.
