= Anita Kerr =

American musician, music producer and conductor (1927–2022)

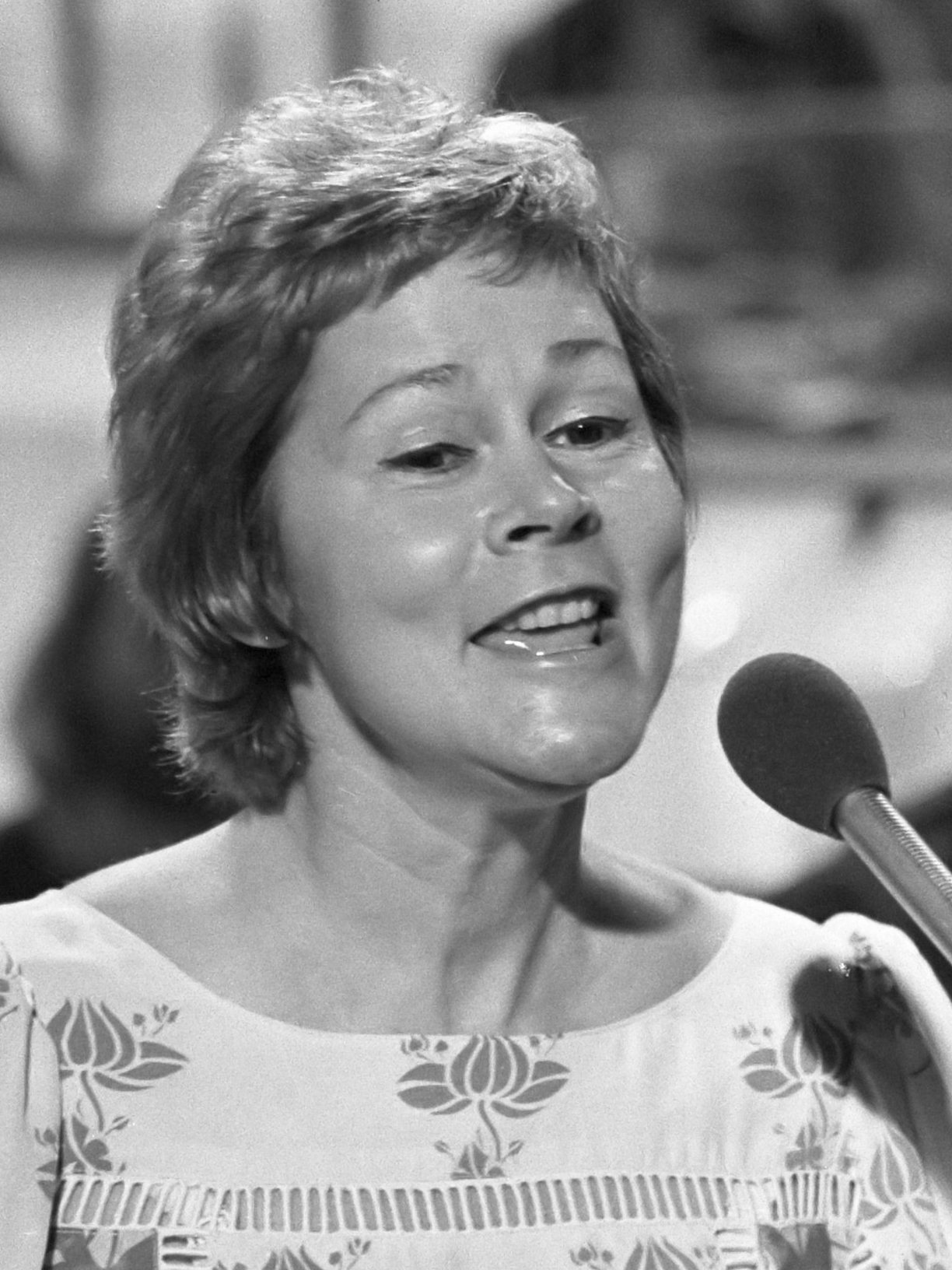
- Kerr in 1974

Background information
- Born: Anita Jean Grilli; October 13, 1927; Memphis, Tennessee, U.S.
- Died: October 10, 2022 (aged 94) Carouge, Geneva, Switzerland
- Genres: Country, pop
- Occupations: Singer, arranger, conductor
- Instruments: Vocals, piano
- Years active: 1950s–2022

Anita Jean Kerr (née Grilli; October 13, 1927 – October 10, 2022) was an American singer, arranger, composer, conductor, pianist, and music producer. She recorded and performed with her vocal harmony groups in Nashville, Los Angeles, and Europe.

== Career ==
=== Nashville ===
Kerr was born in Memphis, Tennessee. In 1947, she married Al Kerr, and they moved to Nashville the following year so that he could take a job as a dee-jay on WKDA. The performances of a vocal quintet she organized attracted the attention of a WSM radio program director, who then hired her to lead and arrange an octet choir on the radio station's "Sunday Down South" broadcasts. Joining her were singers Carl Garvin, Jim Hall, Doug Kirkham, Mary Ellen Puckett, Evelyn Wilson, Mildred Kirkham, and Don Fotrell. The group's first recording session was with Red Foley, and their collaboration resulted in a No. 16 hit on Billboard's Pop chart in 1950: Our Lady of Fatima. The following year, producer Owen Bradley signed them to record for Decca Records. Their talents in demand, Kerr's group continued to sing backup for other country artists in Nashville, including Eddy Arnold, Burl Ives, and Ernest Tubb. The group's recording sessions—initially averaging two per week—increased to eight sessions weekly by 1955.

In 1956, Anita Kerr's singers won a contest on the Arthur Godfrey's Talent Scouts national television program. Now, cut to a quartet at Godfrey's suggestion, the group travelled to New York City two weeks out of every six to appear with Godfrey on his daily television and radio broadcasts. The group contributed backup vocals on Patsy Cline's first studio album. A few years later, Kerr and her singers performed five times a week with Jim Reeves on his national radio program at WSM. The quartet's roster at this time featured tenor Gil Wright (1930 – April 30, 2017), baritone Louis Nunley (October 15, 1931 – October 26, 2012), alto Dorothy "Dottie" Dillard (August 3, 1923 – May 6, 2015), and Kerr herself as both soprano and arranger. Singers and arranger soon began contributing to between twelve and eighteen recording sessions weekly. Having previously backed Faron Young, Chet Atkins, and Webb Pierce on SESAC radio transcription sessions, the Anita Kerr Singers were invited to record their own songs for SESAC. Between 1959 and 1963, the group waxed sixty SESAC tracks. In 1960, as "The Little Dippers," the group recorded a hit single, "Forever", for Unirock Music Inc, of Little Rock, Arkansas, which was released on its University Records label. Crediting herself as "Anita & Th' So-And-So's," Kerr multi-tracked her own voice to record the song Joey Baby, in 1961.

The Anita Kerr Singers signed with RCA Victor in 1961. Their first album for the label was From Nashville...The Hit Sound. Subsequent RCA Victor LPs extended the quartet's repertoire as they explored the soul songs of Ray Charles and the compositions of Henry Mancini.

In early 1965 she described the scope of her Nashville-based background-singing work: "We have all been raised in a pop rather than a country tradition, but it doesn’t matter who we work with. We try to make pleasing, pretty sounds and stay away from anything that gets too jazzy. We’re terribly happy with our own new album, and RCA Victor which I think is the kind we’ve wanted to do and never had a change to do before. We work for all labels—with no billing—but for Victor as the Anita Kerr singers. We’ve done lots of country things and some rock and roll and we finally got Chet Atkins to let us do a real lush mood album with strings. We recorded it on the West Coast with Marty Paich. It may not sell two copies, but we love it. You’d be surprised but it’s really one of the few times we’ve had a chance to take a new approach with our recording. When we want to try something really far out, we’ll try it on a live performance during the few times we get involved in that, and then if it goes over, and we can convince our recording people to let us do it, we may use the idea on a record. Mostly we’re involved with oohs and aahs. And that’s really what most of it amounts to. Although even background styles change. Sometimes Chet…will ask us to think up something different and it’s up to us to come up with a sound. More likely, he’ll ask for a Four Seasons kind of sound. Well, that isn’t too hard because I’ve heard them. Sometimes I won’t have the faintest idea of who he means when he throws a name at us. But more often than not, they’ll play us a record of the group they want us to try to sound like and we work from there.”

The group's 1965 album We Dig Mancini won a Grammy Award for Best Performance by a Vocal Group. In addition to recording as themselves, the Singers continued to perform as backup singers in Nashville. Using Kerr's arrangements, they can be heard on songs by Hank Snow, Brenda Lee, Perry Como, Pat Boone, Rosemary Clooney, Bobby Vinton, Roy Orbison, Willie Nelson, Floyd Cramer, Al Hirt, Ann-Margret, and many other artists. Under her RCA contract, Kerr also arranged and produced a series of albums for The Living Voices on the RCA Camden budget label. These Living Voices recordings included the Anita Kerr Quartet, with the addition of four other vocalists to form an octet. In 1964, together with Chet Atkins, Bobby Bare and Jim Reeves, the Anita Kerr Singers toured Europe.

In the 1960s, Kerr composed and recorded numerous jingles for use by American radio stations, including: Gene Autry's KMPC AM-710 in Los Angeles, California; WMCA AM-570 in New York City; WLS AM-890 in Chicago and at WGH AM-1310 in Newport News, Virginia.

=== Los Angeles ===
The Anita Kerr Singers or The Jordanaires sang background on just about every Nashville hit in the late 1950s and early 1960s. After she and Al Kerr divorced, she disbanded the Nashville version of her Anita Kerr Singers and relocated to Los Angeles in August 1965 with her second husband, Swiss businessman Alex Grob, and her daughters Suzie & Kelly. She no longer wanted to just be a background singer or arranger on country songs – she wanted to do pop music, jazz and "do more orchestral writing and music that was not just country.". She hired some lawyers to get her out of her contract with RCA's Nashville division, got a contract with Warner Bros. Records, and formed a Los Angeles version of the Anita Kerr Singers. The new group, for the next five years, would include alto B.J. Baker or Jackie Ward, tenor Gene Merlino or Bill Cole, baritone Bill Lee, bass Bob Tebow, and Kerr herself as soprano and arranger. The half dozen albums recorded by the Singers for Warner included a cover version of the song "All You Need Is Love" by The Beatles, and one of the LPs was exclusively devoted to the songs of composer Bert Kaempfert. Disguising the group as the Mexicali Singers, Kerr also recorded a trio of mariachi-flavored albums with musical arrangements reminiscent of the Herb Alpert & The Tijuana Brass sound. The Anita Kerr Singers won another Grammy Award for their recording of A Man and a Woman, released as a single on Warner Bros. Records.

In early 1967, Kerr signed on as choral director for the first season of The Smothers Brothers Comedy Hour. She also conducted the choir and orchestra during the sessions for It's Real, a 1967 Capitol LP by singer Dale Evans. In 1967, Kerr, collaborating with poet Rod McKuen, composed, arranged, and conducted music for an instrumental/spoken-word album called The Sea. In 1969, Kerr signed with Dot Records. The Anita Kerr Singers Reflect on the Hits of Burt Bacharach & Hal David was the group's first and Edison-Award-winning album for Dot. The Anita Kerr Singers also recorded a pair of Dot Christmas-music LPs. In the late 1960s, Kerr not only recorded and performed with her own group, but she also arranged and produced records for other artists, including The Mystic Monks, Les Tres Guitars, and Teresa Bennett. Kerr's 1970 Dot album, Touchlove, was the first LP to showcase her skills as a pianist.

=== Europe ===
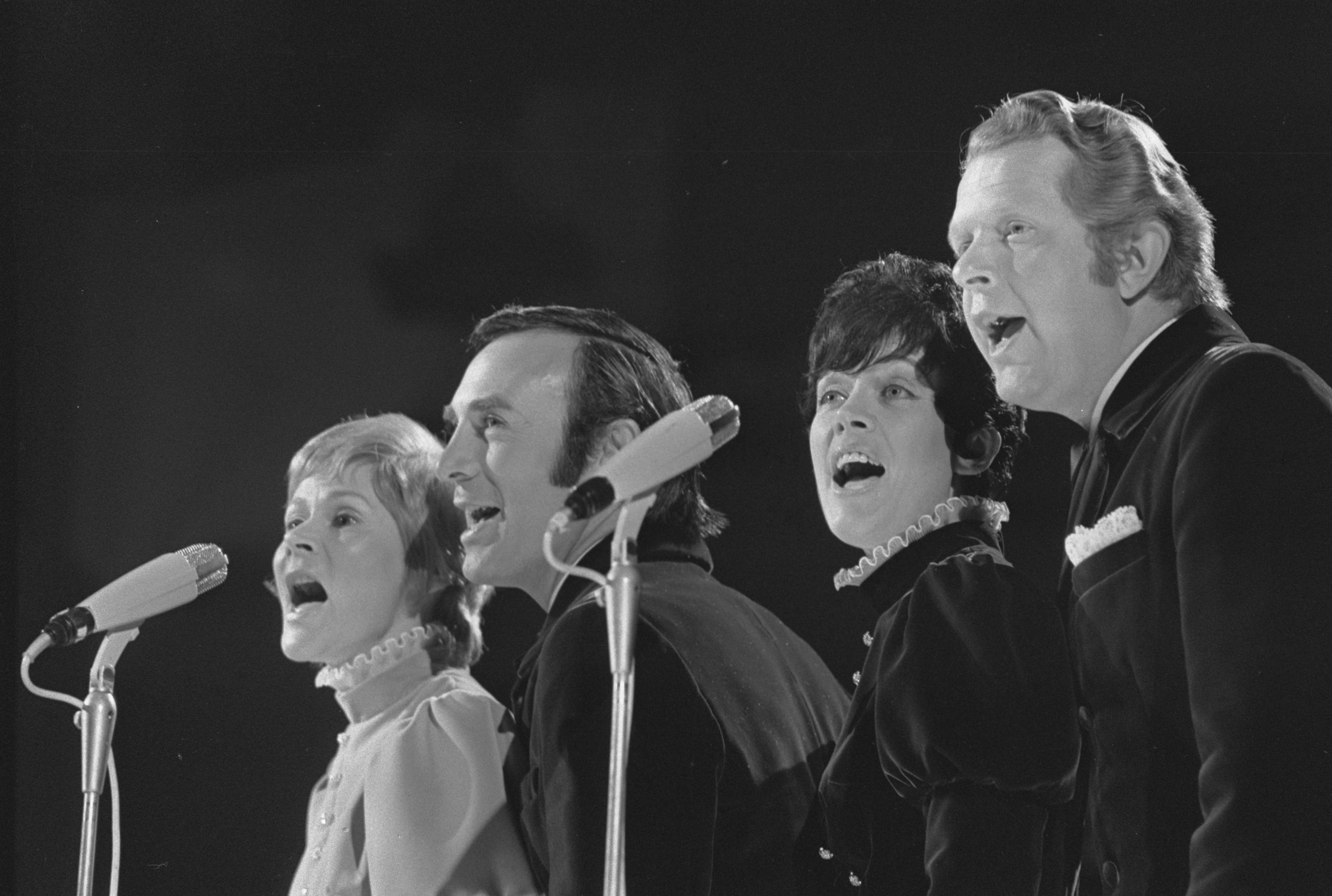
The Anita Kerr Singers performing in Amsterdam for the Edison Award ceremony in 1970 (from left to right, Anita Kerr, Gene Merlino, Jackie Ward and Bob Tebow)

Kerr moved to Switzerland in 1970. Her recording sessions held in London, she launched the Anita Kerr Singers anew with UK talent: Anne Simmons, Ken Barrie (Postman Pat narrator & singer), and Danny Street. In 1971, the Singers recorded the LP A Tribute to Simon and Garfunkel. That same year, Kerr wrote original music and lyrics for the Ampex album A Christmas Story, and she felt privileged to conduct the Royal Philharmonic Orchestra during the recording sessions. Grob and Kerr bought Mountain Studios in Montreux, Switzerland. They sold it, in 1979, to the rock band Queen.

In 1972, Kerr wrote—and MCA Music published—a 103-page book (accompanied by five 45 rpm records) called VOICES. With Complete Recorded Examples. That same year, the Anita Kerr Singers recorded two LPs for Philips and Kerr scored and conducted original music for the motion picture soundtrack to Limbo, a drama starring Kate Jackson. During the early 1970s, Kerr also made numerous personal appearances on television in the Netherlands. In 1974, Kerr began a five-year professional relationship with Word Records. In addition to recording four gospel albums with the Singers, Kerr arranged and produced a series of Hallelujah... instrumental albums for Word. She received Grammy nominations twice for her Word inspirational recordings.

During these years, Kerr also wrote choral and instrumental arrangements for Hal Leonard Corporation, the world's largest music print publisher.

In 1975, Kerr received a special ASCAP Award saluting "[a] lady of class and a first-class musician for her significant contributions to the birth and development of the Nashville sound." Between 1977 and 1988 she continued to perform and record for a variety of record labels. Her work from this period includes: Anita Kerr Performs Wonders, as singer/arranger; The Sound of Warm, as pianist/arranger; and In The Soul, as composer/arranger.

In 1985, Kerr conducted her own composition of Piano, Piano as the Swiss entry for the 1985 Eurovision Song Contest in Göteborg, Sweden. There she earned her rank as the third female conductor in Eurovision history since the debut of two female conductors at the 1973 Eurovision Song Contest, these being Monica Dominique for Sweden and Nurit Hirsh for Israel. In 1992, Kerr received a NARAS Governors Award "[in] recognition of [her] outstanding contribution to American Music."

== Personal life and death ==
Anita married Al Kerr in 1947. They had two daughters, and later divorced. She married Alex Grob in 1965. Kerr died in Carouge, Geneva, Switzerland on October 10, 2022, three days short of her 95th birthday.

== Awards and honors ==
- 1965: The Anita Kerr Singers album We Dig Mancini won a Grammy Award for Best Performance by a Vocal Group.
- 1965: George Beverly Shea's album Southland Favorites, to which The Anita Kerr Quartet contributed, won a Grammy Award for Best Gospel or Other Religious Recording (Musical).
- 1966: The Anita Kerr Singers single "A Man and A Woman" won a Grammy Award for Best Performance by a Vocal Group.
- 1970: The Anita Kerr Singers album The Anita Kerr Singers Reflect on the Hits of Burt Bacharach & Hal David won an Edison Award.
- 1976: The Anita Kerr Singers album Gentle as Morning was nominated for a Grammy Award for Best Inspirational Performance.
- 1976: The Anita Kerr Singers album Walk a Little Slower won a GMA Dove Award for Best Gospel Record Album of the Year by a Non-Gospel Artist.
- 1977: The Anita Kerr Singers album Precious Memories was nominated for a Grammy Award for Best Inspirational Performance.

== Discography ==
- Voices in Hi-Fi (Decca, 1958) As Anita Kerr Quartet
- On This Holy Night (Sesac, 1958) As Anita Kerr Quartet
- The Velvet Voices (Sesac, 1959) As Anita Kerr Quartet
- Velvet Voices Through The Night (Sesac, 1960) As Anita Kerr Singers
- For You, For Me, Forevermore (Decca, 1960) As Anita Kerr Quartet
- From Nashville...The Hit Sound (RCA, 1962) As Anita Kerr Singers
- The Genius in Harmony (RCA, 1962) As Anita Kerr Singers
- Love Well Seasoned (Sesac, 1963) As Anita Kerr Singers
- Tender Words (RCA, 1963) As Anita Kerr Singers
- We Dig Mancini (RCA, 1965) As Anita Kerr Quartet
- The Scene Changes (RCA, 1965) As Anita Kerr Quartet with Perry Como
- Mellow Moods of Love (RCA, 1965) As Anita Kerr Singers
- Sunday Serenade (RCA, 1966) As Anita Kerr Quartet
- And Now...the Anita Kerr Orchestra! (Warner Bros./Seven Arts, 1966)
- Slightly Baroque (Warner Bros./Seven Arts, 1966)
- All You Need Is Love (Warner Bros./Seven Arts, 1967)
- Bert Kaempfert Turns Us On (Warner Bros./Seven Arts, 1967)
- Sounds (Warner Bros./Seven Arts, 1968)
- Georgia on my Mind (RCA Camden, 1968) As Anita Kerr Singers
- Touchlove (Dot, 1969)
- Anita Kerr Presents Les Tres Guitars (Dot, 1969)
- The Anita Kerr Singers Velvet Voices and Bold Brass (Dot, 1969)
- The Anita Kerr Singers Spend This Holiday With Me (Dot, 1969)
- The Anita Kerr Singers Reflect on the Hits of Burt Bacharach & Hal David (Dot, 1969)
- The Anita Kerr Singers It's Anita Kerr Country (Dot, 1970)
- The Anita Kerr Singers Simon & Garfunkel Songbook (Philips, 1970 and Happy Tiger, 1971)
- The Anita Kerr Singers We've Got A Groovy Thing Goin' (Philips, 1971)
- The Anita Kerr Singers Grow To Know Me (Philips, 1971)
- The Anita Kerr Singers I Sang with Jim Reeves (Philips, 1972)
- The Anita Kerr Singers A Christmas Story: Angel in the Faded Blue Jeans (Ampex, 1972)
- The Anita Kerr Singers My Coloring Book (Philips, 1973)
- The Anita Kerr Singers Daytime, Nighttime (Philips, 1973)
- The Anita Kerr Singers Sentimental Journey (Philips, 1974)
- The Anita Kerr Singers Round Midnight (Philips, 1974)
- The Anita Kerr Singers (RCA, 1975)
- Gentle as Morning (Word, 1975)
- Hallelujah Brass (Word, 1975)
- Hallelujah Guitars! (Word, 1976)
- Hymns with Kurt Kaiser (Word, 1977)
- Precious Memories (Word, 1977)
- The Sound of Warm (Monte Rosa, 1977)
- Anita Kerr and the French Connection (RCA Victor, 1977)
- Anita Kerr Performs Wonders (Century, 1979)
- Together with Harry van Hoof, Pieter van Vollenhoven (Philips, 1979)
- The Anita Kerr Singers With Love, from Anita (Carlin Music Corporation 1981)
- In the Soul (Gaia, 1988)

As The Living Voices

- The Living Voices Sing Irish Songs (RCA Camden 1961)
- Indian Love Call (RCA Camden 1962)
- Hootenanny Favorites (RCA Camden 1963)
- Ramblin’ Rose (RCA Camden 1963)
- Smoke Gets In Your Eyes (RCA Camden 1963)
- Come to the Fair (RCA Camden 1964)
- I Don’t Hurt Anymore (1965)
- Mary Poppins (1965)
- The Little Drummer Boy (1965)
- The Singing Nun (1966)
- Positively 4th Street (1966)

As The Mexicali Singers

- The Mexicali Singers (Warner Bros. 1966)
- The Further Adventures of the Mexicali Singers (Warner Bros. 1966)
- The Mexicali Singers Ride Again (Warner Bros. 1967)

With Chet Atkins

- The Amazing Chet Atkins (Sesac, 1960)
- Christmas with Chet Atkins (RCA Victor, 1961)

With Perry Como

- The Scene Changes (RCA Victor, 1965)

With Rod McKuen & the San Sebastian Strings

- The Earth (Warner Bros., 1967)
- The Sea (Warner Bros., 1967)
- The Sky (Warner Bros., 1968)
- Home to the Sea (Warner Bros./Seven Arts, 1968)
- For Lovers (Warner Bros./Seven Arts, 1969)
- The Soft Sea (Warner Bros., 1970)
- Winter (Warner Bros., 1972)
- Spring (Warner Bros., 1973)
- With Love (Warner Bros., 1975)
