= Dear Old Donegal =

Irish-American song

"Dear Old Donegal" is an Irish-American song popularised by American singer Bing Crosby and written by Steve Graham. The song has an 'upbeat' rhythm and is meant to be the words of an Irishman returning to his native County Donegal after becoming successful in the United States.

Dear Old Donegal was also performed by Judy Garland, Zina Bethune, and Vic Damone as part of the All-Purpose Holiday Medley on The Judy Garland Show in 1963. It was parodied by Allan Sherman on his 1962 album My Son, the Folk Singer, as "Shake Hands With Your Uncle Max", using Jewish references rather than Irish. The tune of the song was used in the US comedy Family Guy for the song "Drunken Irish Dad", which was sung by Peter Griffin in the episode "Peter's Two Dads". The song was even nominated for a Primetime Emmy Award for Outstanding Original Music and Lyrics at the 59th Primetime Emmy Awards.

== Film appearances ==
- Gentleman Jim (1942) - (sung and danced by Alan Hale and others)

== Recordings ==
- Bing Crosby, recorded December 6, 1945 with Bob Haggart and his Orchestra with The Jesters.
- Mike Douglas, whose version appeared on an episode of Space Ghost Coast to Coast
- Shirley Ross, performed on Command Performance in 1943
- Dennis Morgan, performs it in the film My Wild Irish Rose (1947)
- Connie Francis included in her album Connie Francis Sings Irish Favorites (1962)
- Josef Locke
- Ruby Murray
- Paddy Noonan
- Paul O'Keefe
- Dennis Day

Forrest Tucker sang a portion of the song in his role as Sergeant Morgan O'Rourke in an episode of the television series F Troop (Season 1, Episode 25, "Reunion For O'Rourke"). It was also sung by Don Knotts as "Barney Fife" in an episode of The Andy Griffith Show (when he was dressed up like a woman to show what a pushover the Mayberry Bank was).

Its latest incarnation is a comedic version about an evil capitalist arriving in Hell, where he meets all his role models in the trade, by Mikhail Horowitz and Gilles Malkine, parodists from Woodstock, NY, on their 2007 CD "Poor, On Tour, & Over 54".

== Lyrics ==
Many versions of the lyrics exist. Some have the singer's 'sister Kate' and the girl at the garden gate as separate people, different lengths of time since the singer left Ireland, and multiple versions of the names sung in the body of the song.
