= Marenariello =

Song
- Language: Italian
- Written: 1893
- Genre: Canzone napoletana
- Songwriter: Salvatore Gambardella

"Marenariello" is a Neapolitan song written in 1893 by Gennaro Ottaviano (words) and Salvatore Gambardella (music). American singer Perry Como included this song in his album Perry Como in Italy in 1966.

The song was adapted into the English language hit "I Have But One Heart" and was sung by Andrea Bocelli on his first classical album Viaggio Italiano released in 1997. A Dutch version, "Het vissermeisje", was a hit in the 1930s for Joseph Schmidt.

== Text of the song ==
Oje né, fa' priesto viene!
nun mme fá spantecá...
ca pure 'a rezza vène
ch'a mare stó' a mená...

Méh, stienne sti bbraccelle,
ajutame a tirá...
ca stu marenariello
te vò sempe abbracciá.

Vicin'ô mare,
facimmo 'ammore,
a core a core,
pe' nce spassá...

Só marenaro
e tiro 'a rezza:
ma, p'allerezza,
stóngo a murí...

Vide ca sbatte ll'onna
comm'a stu core ccá;
de lacreme te 'nfonne
ca 'o faje annammurá...

Viene, 'nterr'a 'sta rena
nce avimm'a recrijá;
che scenne la serena...
io po' stóngo a cantá.

Vicin'ô mare,

Oje né, io tiro 'a rezza
e tu statte a guardá...
li pisce, p'a prijezza,
comme stanno a zumpá!...

E vide, pure 'e stelle
tu faje annammurá...
ca stu marenariello,
tu faje suspirá...

Vicin'ô mare,
