= Alfio (tenor) =

Italian opera singer

- Also known as: Alfio
- Born: Alfio Bonanno; 24 October 1976 (age 49)
- Origin: Sydney
- Genres: Pop, classical, vocal
- Occupations: Singer, tenor, songwriter, musician, composer
- Instruments: Singing, piano, guitar
- Years active: 1993 - present
- Labels: Warner Music Australia, One Voice Entertainment
- Website: AlfioMusic.com

Alfio (born Alfio Bonanno; 24 October 1976) is an Australian-Italian tenor, songwriter, musician, and composer. He began singing at a very early age and started singing professionally at the age of 17, concentrating on recorded music and concerts so far. Alfio has performed in Australia, the United States, Europe, and Asia.

== Early life ==
Alfio Bonanno was born in Sydney, to Italian-born parents, and is the youngest of five children. Born into a musical family where every member sings or plays an instrument, Alfio has always had a passion for music. His father and his mother, both originally from Southern Italy, met and married in Sydney, but their Italian roots remained firmly planted throughout Alfio's childhood.

Alfio attended Patrician Brothers High School in Sydney, where he received First Place grades with High Distinction in Music. While pursuing his music career, he also pursued his interest in design and graduated from the University of Western Sydney with a Bachelor of Arts Degree in Industrial Design.

== Career ==
Alfio began singing professionally at the age of 16 in his local church, leading the whole congregation at Sunday mass. This springboarded to many other gigs performing at restaurants and small venues all over Sydney and the surrounding areas. Alfio started making a name for himself playing piano and performing at venues, singing at weddings for prominent Australians and performing at charity events.

A self-taught musician, Alfio has the ability to play instruments by ear. His instrument of choice is piano, and he also plays guitar, melodica and accordion. He sings in several different languages: English, Italian, Spanish, Arabic, and Chinese, and sings not only the classic songs but many Italian and Spanish folk songs from many different regions in Italy, Spain, and South America.

Alfio recorded and produced two albums in his early years, a self-titled album Alfio in 1998, followed by Cuore e Sentimento in 2002.

After several years of shows and high-level vocal training (see Voice type section) Alfio's tenor range gained him national recognition in Australia, and he was introduced to an executive at Warner Music. One day after that meeting, he was offered a licensing contract with Warner Music Australia. He recorded Tranquillità in 2006 and released it through Warner Music Australia. In addition to songs Alfio wrote himself, the album included Italian classics such as "Ave Maria", "Quando Quando Quando", "Il Mondo", "Amore Scusami" and a Spanish version of "A Mi Manera/My Way". Later that year, Warner Music released Tranquillità: The Christmas Edition which included bonus holiday tracks "Little Drummer Boy", "When a Child Is Born", "Silent Night", and "Tu scendi dalle stelle".

As a songwriter, Alfio has written several noteworthy songs such as "Il Nostro Sogno (Our Dream)", a song about unity and the dream of peace around the world during these turbulent times. This song was the first single on the Tranquillità album. He also wrote "Voce Pura", a song that pays tribute to and is inspired by Luciano Pavarotti. "Voce Pura" was written after a fortuitous meeting and dinner in Sydney in 2005 where Alfio spent time with Pavarotti. The song was born that same night and sent to Maestro Pavarotti shortly before his death.

On the 10th anniversary of 9/11, ALFIO composed "The Power of One: 9/11 Unity and Hope" and released this music tribute in honor of those who lost their lives and loved ones on that tragic day. This tribute was created when he heard the poem "One" by Dr. Cheryl Sawyer in 2008. In 2011, he invited family members of those who perished at Ground Zero to speak the lines of the poem over his music and released the music tribute and video on 11 September 2011.

In 2006, during a show in Sydney, Alfio met the Chairman of the National Italian American Foundation, Dr. A. Kenneth Ciongoli, who invited him to attend and perform at the N.I.A.F. Annual Gala in Washington, D.C., in October 2007. Alfio flew to the U.S. and performed at the Gala and traveled around the U.S. to promote his Tranquillità album.

After touring the U.S. in 2007, Alfio recorded Classic Rewinds, a tribute album to 15 Italian-American singers who influenced Alfio when growing up in Sydney: Frank Sinatra, Dean Martin, Mario Lanza, Perry Como, Vic Damone, Al Martino, Louis Prima, Jerry Vale, Bobby Rydell, Tony Bennett, Frankie Laine, Bobby Darin, Frankie Valli, Bon Jovi, and Frankie Avalon. The album includes covers of "Papa Loves Mambo", "I Have But One Heart", "(Where Do I Begin?) Love Story", "The Loveliest Night of the Year", "The Impossible Dream", "Stranger in Paradise", "Don't Let The Stars Get in Your Eyes", "Jealousy", "My Eyes Adored You", "Dream Lover", "Venus", "Always" and more, as well as 3 original songs written by Alfio. In 2008, 2011 and again in 2012, he was a recipient of the Sergio Franchi Foundation Scholarship Award.

ALFIO released an album of Italian songs titled 'tutta Italiana" in 2011. In addition to several of his original songs, the album includes Italian favorites such as "Chitarra Romana", "Il Mondo", "Amore Scusami", "Mamma", "Dicitencello Vuie", "'O Surdato 'Nnammurato", and Santa Lucia Luntana".

On February 4, 2024 he participated in the famous Italian tv program Domenica in presented by Mara Venier and sang "Il Mondo".

== Voice type ==
Alfio studied tenor and operatic technique with Arax Mansourian (Armenian soprano) in Sydney. Alfio has a tenor range and his voice can start as a soft timbre and escalate to full-blown bravado. He traveled to study voice at a private school in Parma, Italy. While on the road to becoming a tenor, Alfio realized the constraints of that particular musical track clashed with his strong desire to sing both contemporary and classic songs. He completed his studies with High Distinction and returned to Sydney, continuing his own path of singing and composing different genres of music from traditional pop to pop opera.

== Live performances ==
ALFIO is called "The Voice from Oz" because he has such a powerful voice. In addition to his original songs, his live performances consist of singing English and Italian classics, classical favorites, contemporary songs, pop standards, Spanish songs, Italian folk songs and love songs.

== Charities ==
Alfio has performed for several years for charity events, such as the Special Olympics, the Starlight Children's Foundation, the Royal Alexandra Hospital for Children, and Variety children's charity. In 2002, he composed a song for the mentally handicapped athletes for the Special Olympics Gala in Sydney.

== Influences ==
Alfio grew up listening to many Italian and Italian-American artists that have influenced him greatly over the years such as Claudio Villa, Mario Lanza, Luciano Tajoli, Frank Sinatra, Dean Martin, Frankie Laine, Al Martino, Louis Prima, Luciano Pavarotti, Elvis Presley, and Roy Orbison, as well as modern day artists such as Julio Iglesias, Andrea Bocelli, and Luis Miguel. In more recent years, he started listening and appreciating classical music; his classical influences are Mozart, Mascagni, Puccini and Beethoven.

== Discography ==
=== Albums ===
List of albums, with Australian chart positions
| Title | Album details | Peak chart positions |
| Title | Album details | AUS |
|---|---|---|
| Alfio | Released: 1998; Format: CD; Label: | - |
| Cuore e Sentimento | Released: 2002; Format: CD; Label: | - |
| Tranquillità | Released: April 2006; Format: CD; Label: Warner Music Australia (5101-12284-2) | 25 |
| Classic Rewinds | Released: October 2008; Format: CD; Label: One Voice | - |
| Tutta Italiana | Released: March 2011; Format: CD; Label: Alfio | - |
| Tutto Tu | Released: December 2014; Format: CD; Label: Alfio | - |

== Notable performances ==
- Performed for an audience of 1.6 billion at 2006 INDY 300 on the Gold Coast
- Toured with Mino Reitano in Italy in 2004
- Performed as part of a Jerry Vale Tribute Concert in Los Angeles in 2008, performing for Jerry Vale, Barbara Sinatra, and Jimmy Kimmel
- Has performed for dignitaries including Australian Prime Minister Kevin Rudd, former Prime Minister John Howard, Sophia Loren, Martin Scorsese, Rudy Giuliani, Gina Lollobrigida, Nancy Pelosi
- Toured with Zucchero in Australia in 2008
