= Connie Francis Sings "Never on Sunday" =

Connie Francis sings "Never on Sunday"

Studio album by Connie Francis
- Released: October 1961
- Recorded: August 10 and 11, 1961
- Genre: Pop
- Label: MGM
- Producer: Arnold Maxin

Connie Francis chronology
More Greatest Hits (1961)	Connie Francis sings "Never on Sunday" (1961)	Connie Francis Sings Folk Song Favorites (1961)

Connie Francis sings "Never on Sunday" (full title as on cover: Connie Francis sings "Never on Sunday" and Other Title Songs From Motion Pictures) is a studio album of songs from motion pictures recorded by U. S. Entertainer Connie Francis:

- "Anna" (a. k. a. "El bayon", a. k. a. "El negro zumbón") from the 1951 film Anna
- "April Love" from the 1957 film April Love
- "Around the World" from the 1956 film Around the World in 80 Days
- "High Noon" (a. k. a. "Do Not Forsake Me, Oh My Darlin'") from the 1952 film High Noon
- "Love Is a Many-Splendored Thing" from the 1955 film Love Is a Many-Splendored Thing
- "Love Me Tender" from the 1956 film Love Me Tender
- "Moonglow" and "Picnic", a medley of the pop standard "Moonglow" and the theme from the 1955 movie Picnic
- "Never on Sunday" from the 1960 film Never on Sunday
- "Tammy" from the 1957 film Tammy and the Bachelor
- "Three Coins in the Fountain" from the 1954 film Three Coins in the Fountain
- "Where Is Your Heart (Song from Moulin Rouge)" from the 1952 film Moulin Rouge
- "Young at Heart" from the 1954 film Young at Heart

== Overview ==
The album was recorded on August 10 and 11, 1961, at Owen Bradley's studio Bradley Film & Recording in Nashville. Arrangements were provided by Cliff Parman who also conducted the sessions. Background vocals came from Millie Kirkham and The Jordanaires.

Francis first collaboration at Bradley Film & Recording with Parman, Kirkham, The Jordanaires and Owen Bradley's team of musicians (resulting in her first use of the Nashville Sound) had taken place in January 1961 when recording Let the rest of the world go by (which would remain unreleased until 1996) and Someone Else's Boy. The latter was released as a single in the U. S. A. and failed to make the charts. But the international impact of the song was enormous. Francis recorded it in seven other languages, and with the exception of the Dutch version - which remained unreleased until 1988 - all foreign-language versions reached at least the Top Twenty in their respective countries, the German version even topping the Munich charts for several weeks, giving Francis her biggest German hit to date.

In the wake of this success, Francis returned to Nashville several times to record further singles and albums with Bradley's highly prolific team of musicians and arrangers until her contract with MGM Records ended in 1969. "Connie Francis sings 'Never on Sunday'" was the first of these album projects to be released. Another album, "Connie Francis sings Folk Song Favorites", had been recorded two days before on August 8 and 9, 1961 but was released later.

== Track listing ==
=== Side A ===
#	Title	Songwriter	Length
1.	"Never on Sunday"	Manos Hadjidakis, Billy Towne	2.44
2.	"Young at Heart"	Johnny Richards, Carolyn Leigh	3.10
3.	"Around the World"	Harold Adamson, Victor Young	2.28
4.	"High Noon"	Dimitri Tiomkin, Ned Washington	3.24
5.	"April Love"	Sammy Fain, Paul Francis Webster	3.30
6.	"Where Is Your Heart (Song from Moulin Rouge)"	Georges Auric, William Engvick	2.57

=== Side B ===
#	Title	Songwriter	Length
1.	"Three Coins in the Fountain"	Jule Styne, Sammy Cahn	3.09
2.	"Tammy"	Jay Livingston, Ray Evans	3.14
3.	"Anna"	Roman Vatro, William Engvick	2.32
4.	"Moonglow" and "Picnic"	Harry Warren, Jack Brooks	2.52
5.	"Love Me Tender"	George R. Poulton, Ken Darby, Elvis Presley	3.10
6.	"Love Is a Many-Splendored Thing"	Sammy Fain, Paul Francis Webster	2.49
