= Christmas Carousel =

Studio album by Peggy Lee
- Released: October 1960
- Recorded: October 1959; June 15, 19, 1960
- Studio: Capitol (Hollywood)
- Genre: Christmas, vocal jazz
- Length: 40:20
- Label: Capitol
- Producer: Dave Cavanaugh

Peggy Lee chronology
Pretty Eyes (1960)	Christmas Carousel (1960)	Olé ala Lee (1961)

Professional ratings
Review scores
Source	Rating
AllMusic	4.5/5 stars

Christmas Carousel is a 1960 studio album by Peggy Lee, arranged by Billy May.

Some of the album's tracks were reissued, along with three newly recorded songs, on Lee's 1965 album Happy Holiday.

== Track listing ==
1. "I Like a Sleighride (Jingle Bells)" (Traditional) - 2:03
2. "The Christmas Song" (Mel Tormé, Robert Wells) - 2:19
3. "Don't Forget to Feed the Reindeer" (Peggy Lee) - 2:46
4. "The Star Carol" (A.S. Burt, Wihla Hutson) - 2:35
5. "The Christmas List" (Lee) - 2:38
6. "Christmas Carousel" (Lee) - 2:26
7. "Santa Claus Is Coming to Town" (J. Fred Coots, Haven Gillespie) - 2:16
8. "The Christmas Waltz" (Sammy Cahn, Jule Styne) - 2:55
9. "The Christmas Riddle" (Lee, Stella Castelucci) - 3:18
10. "The Tree" (Lee) - 1:41
11. "Deck the Halls" (Traditional) - 2:10
12. "White Christmas" (Irving Berlin) - 2:01

Bonus tracks issued on the 1994 CD release

13. "Winter Wonderland" (Felix Bernard, Richard B. Smith) - 1:51
14. "Little Drummer Boy" (Katherine Kennicott Davis) - 2:12
15. "Happy Holiday" (Irving Berlin) - 1:51
16. "The Christmas Spell" (Jack Palmer, Willard Robison) - 3:15
17. "Toys for Tots" (Sammy Fain, Paul Francis Webster) - 2:03

== Personnel ==
- Peggy Lee - vocals
- Billy May - arranger, conductor
