= Connie Francis Sings Italian Favorites =

Studio album by Connie Francis
- Released: November 1959
- Recorded: August 22, 1959; August 25–27, 1959
- Genre: Pop
- Length: 42:34
- Label: MGM; E-3791 (mono)/SE-3791 (stereo)
- Producer: Danny Davis

Connie Francis chronology
My Thanks to You (1959)	Connie Francis Sings Italian Favorites (1959)	Christmas in My Heart (1959)

Singles from Connie Francis Sings Italian Favorites
- 1. "Mama" Released: February 1960

Connie Francis Sings Italian Favorites is a studio album recorded by American singer and entertainer Connie Francis.

== Background ==
The album consists of traditional Italian and Neapolitan songs (e. g. Santa Lucia) as well as then-current contemporary songs like Volare (Nel blu dipinto di blu) or Piove which both had risen to international fame after being Italy's entries to the Eurovision Song Contests of 1958 and 1959.

Connie Francis Sings Italian Favorites was recorded following a suggestion from Francis' father, George Franconero Sr., who played an active part in directing Francis' career. He had realized that Francis would have to make a timely transition from the youth-oriented Rock 'n' Roll music to adult contemporary music if she wanted to pursue a successful long-term career in music.

To make the album appealing to both Italian immigrants as well as listeners not familiar with Romantic languages, Francis sang most of the songs bilingual in either Italian/English or Neapolitan/English. Only Volare and Piove are sung entirely in Italian whilst Torna a Surriento is sung entirely in Neapolitan. Francis, who didn't learn to speak Italian and Neapolitan fluently until 1962, received assistance from a Berlitz teacher to achieve the correct pronunciation of the lyrics' Italian and Neapolitan lines.

The album was recorded between August 22 and 27, 1959, at EMI's famous Abbey Road Studios in London under the musical direction of Tony Osborne and was released in November 1959. Soon afterwards it entered the album charts where it remained for 81 weeks, peaking at No. 4. It remains to this day as Francis' most successful album release.

Following the success of Connie Francis sings Italian Favorites, Francis recorded seven more albums of "Favorites" between 1960 and 1964, including Jewish, German and Irish Favorites, among others.

== Track listing ==
=== Side A ===
#	Title	Songwriter	Length
1.	"Comm'è bella 'a stagione"	Gigi Pisano, Rodolfo Falvo, George Brown	1.51
2.	"Anema e core"	Salvatore d'Esposito, Domenico Titomalino, Curtis Mann, Harry Akst	3.03
3.	"Arrivederci Roma"	Renato Rascel, Pietro Garinei, Sandro Giovannini, Carl Sigman	2.56
4.	"Solo tu (You alone)"	Robert Allen, Al Stillman	2.57
5.	"Volare"	Domenico Modugno, Franco Migliacci	3.19
6.	"Non dimenticar"	Gino Redi, Michele Galdieri, Shelly Dobbins	3.16
7.	"Toward the End of the Day (Alla fine del dì)"	Jeffrey Stillman	3.16

=== Side B ===
#	Title	Songwriter	Length
1.	"Piove (Ciao, ciao bambina)"	Domenico Modugno	2.52
2.	"Mama"	Cesare Andrea Bixio, Bixio Cherubini, Harold Barlow, Phil Brito	3.55
3.	"Do You Love Me Like You Kiss Me (Scapricciatiello)"	Pacifico Vento, Ferdinando Albano	2.39
4.	"I Have But One Heart (O' Marenariello)"	Gennaro Ottaviano, Salvatore Gambardella, Johnny Farrow, Marty Symes	3.33
5.	"'O sole mio (There's No Tomorrow)"	Eduardo di Capua, Giovanni Capurro	2.56
6.	"Santa Lucia"	traditional, transcription by Teodoro Cottrau	3.12
7.	"Torna a Surriento (Come back to Sorrento)"	Ernesto De Curtis, Giambattista De Curtis	2.49

=== Not included songs from the sessions ===
#	Title	Songwriter	Length	Remark
1.	"Volare"	Domenico Modugno, Franco Migliacci	unknown	alternate version with different arrangement and tempo, unreleased to this day
