= The Godfather (soundtrack) =

Soundtrack album by Nino Rota
- Released: 1972
- Genre: Film score
- Length: 31:01
- Label: Paramount (original) / MCA (CD)
- Producer: Tom Mack

The Godfather chronology
The Godfather (1972)	The Godfather Part II (1974)

The Godfather is the soundtrack from the film of the same name, released in 1972 by Paramount Records, and in 1991 on compact disc by MCA. Rota created new themes and also drew from his prior work on the 1958 film Fortunella and Jean Sibelius' Symphony No. 1 when creating the pieces. Carmine Coppola created music for the film, of which the song "Connie's Wedding" is featured on the soundtrack. The soundtrack also contains the 1945 song "I Have But One Heart", sung by Al Martino as he portrays Johnny Fontane in the film.

The soundtrack was well received by critics and received several award nominations. Critics found it evoked a nostalgic feel. It was further praised for its use of instruments which seemed to match the tone of the actors on screen, as well as the solos done seemed to represent the isolation of the Corleone family. It won the Golden Globe Award for Best Original Score, the BAFTA Award for Best Film Music, and Grammy Award for Best Score Soundtrack for Visual Media, while its nomination at the 45th Academy Awards for the Best Original Dramatic Score with "Love Theme" was removed because of its similarity to the aforementioned Fortunella's score.

== Background and recording ==
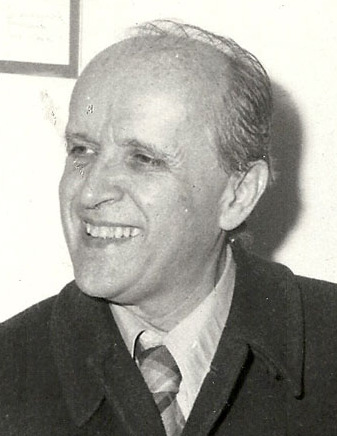
Rota in 1976

Coppola hired Italian composer Nino Rota to create the underscore for the film, including the main theme, "Speak Softly, Love". In October 1971, Coppola flew to Rome with a copy of the film to give Rota to view and create the score accordingly. For the score, Rota was to relate to the situations and characters in the film. Scott Cain of The Atlanta Journal and Constitution reacted to Rota's work with the movie's score by saying that regardless of how the movie turned out, "it will be worthwhile just for Rota's contributions." Rota synthesized new music for the film and took some parts from his 1958 Fortunella film score, in order to create an Italian feel and evoke the film's tragic themes. Rota also based the piece "Main Theme (The Godfather Waltz)" off the opening melody of Jean Sibelius' Symphony No. 1. Paramount executive Evans found the score to be too "highbrow" and did not want to use it; however, it was used after Coppola managed to get Evans to agree. Coppola believed that Rota's musical piece gave the film even more of an Italian feel. Coppola's father, Carmine, created some additional music for the film, particularly the music played by the band during the opening wedding scene.

== Release ==
The soundtrack for the film was released on LP in 1972 by Paramount Records and on CD in 1991 by MCA Records. The album contains 31 minutes of music coming from the film, with most being composed by Rota, along with a song from Coppola and one by Johnny Farrow and Marty Symes. There were 29 recordings of Nino Rota's music on the market by April 1972, specifically the songs recorded were "The Godfather Waltz", "Speak Softly Love," and "Love Theme from The Godfather." It was expected more recordings would be hitting the market as the year went on.

== Critical reception and accolades ==
Professional ratings
Review scores
Source	Rating
AllMusic	5/5 stars
Filmtracks	4/5 stars

The soundtrack was well received by music critics. The United Press International's William D. Laffler wrote that the "Main Title" was a "haunting piece of music which generates nostalgic longing for things past and a foreboding underlying theme." He felt that the soundtrack grows on the listener with each play and predicted it would become one of the biggest sellers in the calendar year. William J. Knittle Jr. of the Daily News–Post felt Rota's titular theme was why The Godfather was "close to being the perfect American film." He continued by stating Rota broke from his "usual lush string tour de force." He described the music was "meaningful and involving," while explaining that the use of cello and cornet solos demonstrated the isolation and insulation of the Corleone family. He closed the review by saying the music showed Italian influence and had a natural progression. The Journal and Courier's Bernard Drew felt Rota's musical pieces were haunting and "bridged gaps and served as a reminder of how things were." Harry Haun of The Tennessean described Rota's score as "baleful," but felt that it kept with the pace of the movie as well.

Peter Barsocchini of The Times wrote that The Godfather soundtrack was able to stand on its own. He elaborated on the soundtrack, stating it was "extremely evocative" and that it kept with the time period the movie was set. He further explained that the soundtrack was "rich and interesting, without, except for one cut (the vocal by Al Martino), being at all typed." Barsocchini considered "Main Title" to be the best track on the album as "it is at once chilling and plaintive and nostalgic, but it also evokes the humanity of The Godfather, gives the image of a man instead of a ruthless monster, which is a brilliant composition." He wrote that "The Halls of Fear" explored the concept of fear well in an a-melodramatic way, and summed up the album by stating it was worthy of one's attention, even to those not interested in the film. Detroit Free Press's Bob Talbert described Rota's score as "right on the money" and "[captured] the feel of the '40s and the power of Marlon Brando." He generally commented that the instruments used in the movie matched the intensity of Brando and Al Pacino, also describing Martino as "a thinly disguised Frank Sinatra." Retrospectively, AllMusic gave the album five out of five stars, with editor Zach Curd describing the album as a "dark, looming, and elegant soundtrack." An editor for Filmtracks believed that Rota was successful in relating the music to the film's core aspects.

Rota's score was also nominated for Grammy Award for Best Original Score for a Motion Picture or TV Special at the 15th Grammy Awards, in which he was announced the winner of the category on March 3 at the Grammys' ceremony in Nashville, Tennessee. Rota had received a nomination for the Best Original Score at the 45th Academy Awards. Upon further review of Rota's love theme from The Godfather, the academy found that Rota had used a similar score in Eduardo De Filippo's 1958 comedy Fortunella. This led to re-balloting, where members of the music branch chose from six films: The Godfather and the five films that had been on the shortlist for best original dramatic score but did not get nominated. John Addison's score for Sleuth won this new vote, and thus replaced Rota's score on the official list of nominees.

Awards and nominations received by The Godfather
Award	Category	Nominee	Result
45th Academy Awards (1972)	Best Original Dramatic Score	Nino Rota	Revoked (Note: Following its nomination, The Godfather's main score, "Love Theme from The Godfather," was found similar to Rota's previous score from the 1958 film Fortunella. This led to the Academy placing the theme into a new ballot with five other movie's main scores that missed the original cut for nominations to determine who would hold the final spot for the Academy Award category for Best Original Dramatic Score. The theme lost the vote and was replaced by John Addison's score for Sleuth.)
26th British Academy Film Awards (1973)	Best Film Music	Nino Rota	Won
30th Golden Globes (1973)	Best Original Score	Nino Rota	Won
15th Annual Grammy Awards (1973)	Best Original Score Written for a Motion Picture or TV Special	Nino Rota	Won

== Track listing ==
Side one
No.	Title	Writer(s)	Length
1.	"Main Title (The Godfather Waltz)"	Nino Rota	3:05
2.	"I Have But One Heart"	Johnny Farrow, Marty Symes	2:57
3.	"The Pickup"	Nino Rota	2:56
4.	"Connie's Wedding"	Carmine Coppola	1:33
5.	"The Halls of Fear"	Nino Rota	2:12
6.	"Sicilian Pastorale"	Nino Rota	3:02

Side two
No.	Title	Writer(s)	Length
1.	"Love Theme from The Godfather"	Nino Rota	2:39
2.	"The Godfather Waltz"	Nino Rota	3:35
3.	"Apollonia"	Nino Rota	1:22
4.	"The New Godfather"	Nino Rota	1:59
5.	"The Baptism"	Nino Rota	1:50
6.	"The Godfather Finale"	Nino Rota	3:51
Total length:			31:01

== Personnel ==
Credits are adapted from Tidal and the album's liner notes.

- Nino Rota – leading artist, composition (1, 3, 5–12)
- Tom Mack – production
- Hollywood Studio Symphony – orchestra
- Carlo Savina – conduction (1, 7)
- Johnny Farrow – composition (2)
- Marty Symes – composition (2)
- Al Martino – vocals (2)
- Carmine Coppola – composition (4)
- Don MacDougall – mixing engineer (original score)
- Thorne Nogar – mastering engineer (re-recording)

== Release history ==
List of release dates, formats, label, editions and reference
Date	Format(s)	Label(s)	Ref(s)
1972	Vinyl	Paramount Records	
1991	CD	MCA Records	
