= The Perry Como Christmas Album =

Studio album by Perry Como
- Released: October 1968
- Recorded: August 1, 3, 6, 1968
- Genre: Vocal
- Label: RCA Victor
- Producer: Andy Wiswell

Perry Como chronology
Perry Como in Italy (1966)	The Perry Como Christmas Album (1968)	Look to Your Heart (1968)

Professional ratings
Review scores
Source	Rating
AllMusic	3/5 stars

The Perry Como Christmas Album is Perry Como's 15th RCA Victor 12" long-play album.

Como is accompanied on the album by the Ray Charles Singers and an orchestra arranged and conducted by Nick Perito. On two songs, "The Little Drummer Boy" and "Have Yourself a Merry Little Christmas", boy choristers from the Little Church Around the Corner and from Saint Thomas Church (Manhattan) also participated.

== Track listing ==
=== Side one ===
1. "Christmas Eve" (Music by Gerard Andre Biesel and lyrics by Ray Charles)
2. "Do You Hear What I Hear?" (Words and Music by Noël Regney and Gloria Shayne Baker)
3. "Christ Is Born" (Words and Music by Domenico Bartolucci and Ray Charles)
4. "The Little Drummer Boy" (Words and Music by Henry Onerati, Katherine Davis and Harry Simeone)
5. "There Is No Christmas Like a Home Christmas" (Words and Music by Carl Sigman and Mickey J. Addy)
6. "O Holy Night" (Words and Music by Adolphe Charles Adam)

=== Side two ===
1. "Caroling, Caroling" (Words and Music by Wihla Hutson and Alfred Burt)
2. "The First Noël" (Traditional Christmas Music)
3. "Hark! The Herald Angels Sing" (Music by Felix Mendelssohn and lyrics by Charles Wesley)
4. "Silent Night" (Music by Joseph Mohr and lyrics by Franz Gruber)
5. "Silver Bells" (Music and Lyrics by Jay Livingston and Ray Evans)
6. "Toyland" (Words and Music by Victor Herbert)
7. "Have Yourself a Merry Little Christmas" (Words and Music by Hugh Martin and Ralph Blane)
8. "Ave Maria" (Original Music by Franz Schubert)

Como also recorded a rendition of the Wihla Hutson-Alfred Burt composition "Some Children See Him" during the sessions, but this was omitted from the finished album, presumably due to space limitations. The track remained unreleased until its inclusion on a 1999 CD compilation of Como Christmas recordings.
