= Connie Francis Sings Folk Song Favorites =

Connie Francis sings Folk Song Favorites

Studio album by Connie Francis
- Released: November 1961
- Recorded: August 8 and 9, 1961
- Genre: Folk
- Labels: MGM; E-3969 (mono)/SE-3969 (stereo)
- Producer: Arnold Maxin

Connie Francis chronology
Connie Francis sings "Never on Sunday" (1961)	Connie Francis sings Folk Song Favorites (1961)	Connie Francis sings Irish Favorites (1962)

Singles from Connie Francis sings Folk Song Favorites
- 1. "Come On, Jerry (Timber)" Released: late 1964; 2. "She'll Be Comin' 'Round the Mountain" Released: early 1965

Connie Francis sings Folk Song Favorites is a studio album of Folk Songs recorded by U. S. Entertainer Connie Francis.

== Background ==
The album was recorded on August 8 and 9, 1961, at Owen Bradley's studio Bradley Film & Recording in Nashville. Arrangements were provided by Cliff Parman who also conducted the sessions. Background vocals came from Millie Kirkham and The Jordanaires.

Francis first collaboration at Bradley Film & Recording with Parman, Kirkham, The Jordanaires and Owen Bradley's team of musicians(resulting in her first use of the Nashville Sound) had taken place in January 1961 when recording "Let the rest of the world go by" (which would remain unreleased until 1996) and "Someone Else's Boy". The latter was released as a single in the U. S. A. and failed to make the charts. But the international impact of the song was enormous. Francis recorded it in seven other languages, and with the exception of the Dutch version – which remained unreleased until 1988 – all foreign-language versions reached at least the Top Twenty in their respective countries, the German version even topping the Munich charts for several weeks, giving Francis her biggest German hit to date.

In the wake of this success, Francis returned to Nashville several times to record further singles and albums with Bradley's highly prolific team of musicians and arrangers until her contract with MGM Records ended in 1969. "Connie Francis sings Folk Song Favorites was the first of these album projects to be recorded. Another album, "Connie Francis sings 'Never on Sunday'", had was recorded two days later on August 10 and 11, 1961 but was released in October 1961, one month prior to the Folk Song album.

Two songs from the album were released in late 1964 and early 1965 as single B-sides. Come On, Jerry (Timber) was released as B-Side of "Whose Heart Are You Breaking Tonight?", and She'll Be Comin' 'Round the Mountain was released as B-Side of For Mama.

== Track listing ==
=== Side A ===
#	Title	Songwriter	Length
1.	"O Suzanna"	Stephen Foster	1.36
2.	"Red River Valley"	traditional	1.58
3.	"Boll Weevil"	traditional	2.10
4.	"True Love, True Love"	traditional	2.58
5.	"Clementine"	traditional	1.51
6.	"Aura Lee"	W. W. Fosdick, George R. Poulton	2.10

=== Side B ===
#	Title	Songwriter	Length
1.	"Come On, Jerry (Timber)"	traditional	1.54
2.	"Careless Love"	traditional	2.12
3.	"Every Night (When The Sun Goes In)"	traditional	3.19
4.	"She'll Be Comin' 'Round The Mountain"	traditional	1.53
5.	"Beautiful Brown Eyes"	traditional	2.20
6.	"On Top Of Old Smokey"	traditional	2.01
