= Perry Como in Italy =

Studio album by Perry Como
- Released: July 1966
- Recorded: May 9, 11, 13, 16, 17, 18, 19, 1966
- Genre: Vocal
- Label: RCA Victor
- Producer: Andy Wiswell

Perry Como chronology
Lightly Latin (1966)	Perry Como in Italy (1966)	The Perry Como Christmas Album (1968)

Professional ratings
Review scores
Source	Rating
Allmusic	4.5/5 stars

Perry Como in Italy is Perry Como's 14th RCA Victor 12" long-play album.

== Background ==
By 1966, Como's chart presence decline, but he still recorded charting albums, and this was his second language themed album, coming after his last one, "lightly Latin", which reached No. 86 on the Billboard Top LPs.

== Overview ==
"In Italy" was recorded at the RCA Italiana studios in Rome with arrangements by Nick Perito and choral direction by Ray Charles. The album did slightly better than his last one, reaching No. 81 on the Billboard Top LPs.

== Track listing ==
Side 1

1. "Souvenir d'Italie"
2. "Oh, Mary!"
3. "Cominciamo ad amarci"
4. "Love Theme from "La Strada"" ( Traveling Down a Lonely Road )
5. "Forget Domani"
6. "Anema e core"

Side 2

1. "Un giorno dopo l'altro" ( One day after another)
2. "Santa Lucia"
3. "E Lei" ( And You )
4. "Toselli's Serenade" ( Dreams and Memories )
5. "O Marenariello"
6. "Arrivederci Roma" ( Goodbye Rome )

== Charts ==
Chart (1966)	Peak position
US Billboard Top LPs	81
US Cashbox Top LPs	91
