= Lightly Latin =

Studio album by Perry Como
- Released: May 1966
- Recorded: December 29, 30, 1965 ~ February 22, 25, 28, March 1, 1966
- Genre: Vocal
- Label: RCA Victor
- Producer: Andy Wiswell

Perry Como chronology
The Scene Changes (1965)	Lightly Latin (1966)	Perry Como in Italy (1966)

Professional ratings
Review scores
Source	Rating
AllMusic	4/5 stars
The Encyclopedia of Popular Music	2/5 stars
Billboard	Positive

Lightly Latin is Perry Como's 13th RCA Victor 12" long-play album.

== Background ==
By 1966 Como semi-retired, but still released singles, with "Coo Coo Roo Coo Coo Paloma" being his only single to chart in 1966, reaching No. 12 on the AC chart, with that minor success he decided to release an album with more "light" Latin songs.

== Overview ==
The album features lighter Latin-American style arrangements by Nick Perito, his first collaboration with Como. The 1966 release includes five compositions by Brazilian guitarist and bossa Nova specialist Antonio Carlos Jobim, the recent Grammy Award winning hit from the Vincente Minnelli directed motion picture The Sandpiper; The Shadow Of Your Smile, and an early cover version of "Yesterday" by the Beatles.

The album reached No. 86 on Billboard Top LPs, with the minor success he made another language themed album a few months later.

== Reception ==
Billboard said that "Perry's nation-wide TV following consistent record sales, coupled with the current interest in Latin music, make this one, (the album), a natural."

== Track listing ==
=== Side 1 ===
1. "How Insensitive" (music by Antônio Carlos Jobim and Vinicius De Moraes)
2. "Stay With Me" (Music by Nick Perito and lyrics by Ray Charles)
3. "(The) Shadow of Your Smile" (music by Johnny Mandel & words by Paul Francis Webster)
4. "Meditation" (music by Antonio Carlos Jobim with original lyrics by Newton Mendonça)
5. "And Roses and Roses" (words and music by Ray Gilbert and Dorival Caymmi)
6. "Yesterday" (words and music by John Lennon and Paul McCartney)

=== Side 2 ===
1. "Coo Coo Roo Coo Coo Paloma" (music by Sosa Tomas Mendez and lyrics by Patricia P. Valando and Ronnie Carson)
2. "Dindi" (Music by Antônio Carlos Jobim with lyrics by Aloysio De Oliveira)
3. "Baía" (Music and original lyrics by Ary Evangelista Barroso)
4. "Once I Loved" (music by Antônio Carlos Jobim with lyrics by Vinicius De Moraes)
5. "Manhã de Carnaval" (music by Luiz Bonfá and lyrics by Antonio Mariz)
6. "Quiet Nights of Quiet Stars" (music by Antônio Carlos Jobim, Gene Lees and Buddy Kaye)

== Charts ==
Chart (1966)	Peak position
US Billboard Top LPs	86
US Cashbox Top 100 Albums	65
