= Connie Francis Sings Spanish and Latin American Favorites =

Studio album by Connie Francis
- Released: September 1960
- Recorded: July 2, 4, and 6, 1960
- Genre: Pop
- Length: 35:22
- Label: MGM Records; E-3853 (mono)/SE-3853 (stereo)
- Producer: Arnold Maxin

Connie Francis chronology
One for the Boys (1959)	Connie Francis Sings Spanish and Latin American Favorites (1960)	Connie Francis Sings Jewish Favorites (1960)

Singles from Connie Francis Sings Spanish and Latin American Favorites
- 1. "Malagueña" Released: August 1960

Connie Francis Sings Spanish and Latin American Favorites is a studio album of Spanish and Latin American songs recorded by American entertainer Connie Francis.

== Background ==
After the success of her 1959 album Connie Francis Sings Italian Favorites (which remained on the albums chart for 81 weeks and peaked at No. 4), Francis released more albums which appealed to immigrants in the United States.

In July 1960, Francis was in Hollywood for the interior shots of her first motion picture Where the Boys Are which made it impossible for her to record the album during live sessions at EMI's famous Abbey Road Studios in London as she had done with Connie Francis sings Italian Favorites. Hence, the playbacks to these songs were pre-recorded in London under the supervision of Francis' British producer Norman Newell and were conducted by Geoff Love. The tapes containing these playbacks were shipped to Hollywood, where Francis overdubbed her vocals.

Francis had studied Spanish in school; as such, she was fluent in the language. This prompted her to perform the songs either entirely in Spanish or bilingual with a few lines sung in English.

The album was originally released in September 1960 under the catalogue numbers E-3853 (mono) and SE-3853 (stereo) on MGM Records. The album consisted of 13 songs, although 15 playbacks had been produced. First pressings of the album contain the complete intended listing of all 15 tracks on the cover, though actually the songs Amor and Aquellos ojos verdes were not released in the U. S. and at that time were only available on singles and EPs in Spain and South America.

== Track listing ==
=== Side A ===
#	Title	Songwriter	Length	Remark
1.	"Malagueña"	Ernesto Lecuona	3.06	Spanish
2.	"Quiéreme mucho"	Gonzalo Roig, Albert Gamse, Jack Sherr	2.51	Bilingual Spanish/English
3.	"Siboney"	Ernesto Lecuona	2.49	Spanish
4.	"Solamente una vez"	Agustín Lara, Ray Gilbert	2.44	Bilingual Spanish/English
5.	"Quién séra" (bilingual Spanish/English)	Pablo Beltrán Ruiz, Norman Gimbel	1.53	Bilingual Spanish/English
6.	"Quizás, Quizás, Quizás"	Osvaldo Farrés	2.05	Spanish
7.	"Beso de fuego"	Ángel Villoldo	2.32	Spanish

=== Side B ===
#	Title	Songwriter	Length	Remark
1.	"Granada"	Agustín Lara	3.34	Spanish
2.	"Bésame Mucho"	Consuelo Velázquez, Sunny Skylar	2:42	Bilingual Spanish/English
3.	"Nosotros"	Pedro Junco Jr.	2.54	Bilingual Spanish/English
4.	"Vaya con Dios"	Larry Russel, Inez James, Buddy Pepper	3.06	Spanish
5.	"Te quiero, dijiste"	María Grever	2.24	Spanish
6.	"Jalousie (Jealousy)"	Jacob Gade	2.42	Spanish

=== Not included songs from the sessions ===
#	Title	Songwriter	Length	Remark
1.	"Amor"	Gabriel Ruiz (composer), Ricardo López Méndez	2.40	Spanish
2.	"Amor"	Gabriel Ruiz, Ricardo López Méndez, Sunny Skylar	2.38	Bilingual English-Spanish
3.	"Quiénséra"	Pablo Beltrán Ruiz, Norman Gimbel	1.53	Spanish
4.	"Aquellos ojos verdes"	Adolfo Utrera, Nilo Ménendez, Eddie Rivera, Eddie Woods	2.38	Bilingual Spanish/English
