= Nojazz =

- Origin: Paris, France
- Genres: jazz, electro jazz, soul
- Years active: 2002-present
- Labels: Warner Bros., Pulp Music
- Members: Philippe Balatier, Philippe Sellam, Sylvain Gontard, Pascal Reva, Jeffrey Mpondo
- Website: www.nojazz.fr

Nojazz is a French electro jazz band.

== Overview ==
Nojazz started up as an electro jazz band in 2001. During 2002, they released their debut studio album upon Warner Bros. Records. This self titled LP was produced by Teo Macero.

From their beginnings Nojazz has included diverse collaborations from different backgrounds. Mangu joined the band for an energetic rap on the song Candela. Later, Claude Nougaro collaborated on K du Q. Their year-after-year tours in the U.S. allowed them to meet and start collaborating with Earth, Wind and Fire, leading to a session with Maurice White and Stevie Wonder on the Have Fun album.

== Members ==
- Philippe Balatier : Keyboard, Sampling
- Philippe Sellam : Saxophone
- Sylvain Gontard : Trumpet
- Pascal Reva : Percussion
- Jeffrey Mpondo : lead Vocal

== Discography ==
- Nojazz (2002)
- NoLimits (2004)
- Have Fun (2005)
- ZooLand (2009)
- Live au Sunset (2013)
- Soul stimulation (2016)
