= Sobre las olas =

Waltz by Juventino Rosas

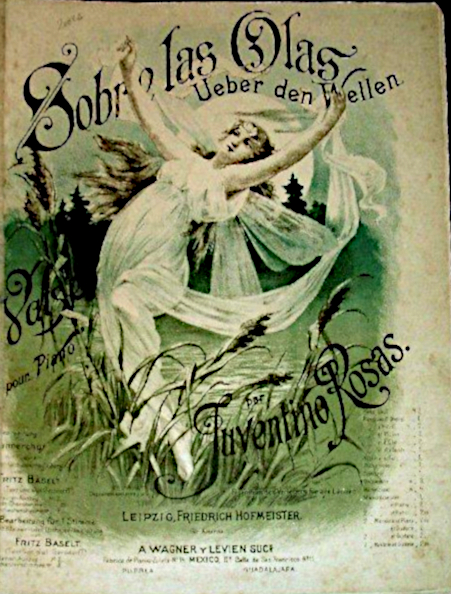
Piano sheet music cover (Germany)

MIDI-based piano version

The waltz "Sobre las olas" ("Over the Waves") is the best-known work of Mexican composer Juventino Rosas (1868–1894), who first published it in 1888. It "remains one of the most famous Latin American pieces worldwide", according to the "Latin America" article in The Oxford Companion to Music. It remains popular as a classic waltz, and has also found its way into New Orleans jazz and Tejano music.

== Recordings ==
- Dave Brubeck on Bravo! Brubeck! (1967)
- Chet Atkins, on Alone (1973)
- The Beach Boys, on Feel Flows (2021) (recorded in 1970 as "Carnival")
- Willie Nelson, on Red Headed Stranger (1975)
- Pete Fountain, on Mr. New Orleans

== In popular media ==
- A Mexican biographical film about the life of Juventino Rosas, titled Sobre las olas, was directed by Miguel Zacarías in 1933. Another Mexican film biography using this title was directed in 1950 by Ismael Rodríguez and starred Pedro Infante.
- In The Philadelphia Story (1940), Cary Grant hums the opening bars while playing with candlesticks.
- Snippets of the melody were used in Warner Bros. cartoons, including in An Itch in Time (1943) and Canary Row (1950).
- A cover with English lyrics is performed as "The Loveliest Night of the Year" in the 1951 American film The Great Caruso.
- In Mary Poppins (1964), the character Bert (played by Dick Van Dyke) briefly hums "Sobre las olas" while pretending to be a tightrope walker, reinforcing the melody's association with circus acts.
- "Sobre las olas" is the main musical theme of the 1980 arcade game Carnival.
- The theme is used in the Atari 2600 video game Pitfall II: Lost Caverns (1984).
- The theme is used as the song for the "Observatory" ride in the 1994 video game Theme Park.
- A rendition by the Mexico Festival Orchestra, conducted by Enrique Bátiz, is included in the in-game classical radio station Radio Eterna of the 2021 racing game Forza Horizon 5.
- It is one of the most famous pieces of music traditionally played on merry-go-rounds and carousels.
