= The Scene Changes (Perry Como album) =

Studio album by Perry Como
- Released: May 1965
- Recorded: February 9, 11, and 12, 1965
- Studio: RCA Studio A (Nashville, Tennessee)
- Genre: Nashville sound
- Label: RCA Victor
- Producer: Chet Atkins

Perry Como chronology
The Songs I Love (1963)	The Scene Changes (1965)	Lightly Latin (1966)

The Scene Changes is Perry Como's 12th RCA Victor 12-inch long-play album. Songs for the album were recorded at RCA Victor's Nashville studios under the helm of producer Chet Atkins.

== Overview ==
With The Scene Changes, producer Chet Atkins combines Como's vocals with the "Nashville sound" that Atkins help popularize. Anita Kerr was also brought in as the conductor and arranger, while the Anita Kerr Quartet provided vocal harmonies. Floyd Cramer pitches in on piano. The album includes the hit single, "Dream On Little Dreamer".

== Critical reception ==
Professional ratings
Review scores
Source	Rating
AllMusic	3/5 stars
Record Mirror	4/5 stars

Variety notes "Como delivers a repoertoire of folk-flavored ballads with his distinctively easy-going style."

Being recorded in Nashville, Record Mirror notes "the instrumentalists behind Perry are all a part of the Nashville scene and although you could never call Perry a C & W singer, he does capture some of the Jim Reeves deep-voiced atmosphere."

Jason Ankeny of AllMusic believes "Como's effortless sophistication proves an ideal match for the Nashville sound."

== Chart performance ==
The album reached No. 47 on the Billboard Top LP's chart during a 17-week chart run. In Cash Box magazine, the album peaked at No. 27 during a 15-week chart run.

== Track listing ==
Side one

1. "Where Does a Little Tear Come From?" (Johnny MacRae, Marge Barton) – 2:23
2. "Funny How Time Slips Away" (Willie Nelson) – 3:02
3. "Here Comes My Baby" (Bill West, Dottie West) – 2:35
4. "Sweet Adorable You" (Thomas Baker Knight) – 2:25
5. "I Really Don't Want to Know" (Don Robertson, Howard Barnes) – 2:36
6. "That Ain't All" (John D. Loudermilk) – 2:07

Side two

1. "Dream On Little Dreamer" (Jan Crutchfield, Fred Burch) – 2:18
2. "Stand Beside Me" (Tompall Glaser) – 2:47
3. "A Hatchet, A Hammer, A Bucket of Nails" (Eddie Snyder, Sarah Graham, Richard Ahlert) – 1:58
4. "Gringo's Guitar" (Cindy Walker) – 2:58
5. "My Own Peculiar Way" (Nelson) – 2:48
6. "Give Myself a Party" (Don Gibson) – 2:37

== Charts ==
Chart (1965)	Peak position
US Billboard Top LP's	47
US Cash Box Top 100 Albums	27

== Personnel ==
Credits adapted from LP liner notes.

Musicians

- Perry Como – vocals
- The Anita Kerr Quartet – vocals

Additional musicians

- Grady Martin – guitar
- Ray Edenton – guitar
- Hal Bradley – guitar
- Jim Wilkerson – guitar
- Floyd Cramer – piano
- Boots Randolph – saxophone
- Buddy Harman – drums, tambourine
- Bob Moore – double bass
- Charlie McCoy – harmonica
- Pete Drake – steel guitar
- Cam Mullins – trumpet, trombone
- Dutch McMillin – saxophone

Technical

- Chet Atkins – producer
- Anita Kerr – arranger
- Chuck Seitz – engineer
- William Vandevort – engineer
- Red O'Donnell – liner notes
