= I Have But One Heart =

1945 song by Johnny Farrow and Marty Symes

Song by Vic Damone
- A-side: "Ivy"
- Released: 1947
- Genre: Traditional pop
- Label: Mercury
- Songwriters: Johnny Farrow, Marty Symes

"I Have But One Heart" is a 1945 popular music song composed by Johnny Farrow, with lyrics by Marty Symes.

== Background ==
The song is adapted from the traditional Neapolitan song "'O Marenariello."

== 1947 recordings ==
A recording by Vic Damone, his first release, reached #7 on the Billboard chart in 1947 and the recording by Frank Sinatra also charted, reaching the No. 13 position.

== Other recordings ==
The song has been recorded by others such as Dean Martin, Jerry Vale, and Joni James. Sergio Franchi sung it, alone and in a medley with Speak Softly Love, for The Godfather. This version is on such albums as 20 Magnificent Songs (DynaHouse, 1976) and From My Private Collection - Con Amore (Gold Records, 1976). In 2008, Australian singer Alfio recorded it for his album Classic Rewinds, a tribute to Vic Damone, Al Martino and 13 other Italian American singers.

== Popular culture ==
"I Have But One Heart" is sung by Johnny Fontane (Al Martino) in The Godfather, during Connie's wedding. It is on the soundtrack album. This version plays in the background of The Batman when Bruce Wayne confronts mobster Carmine Falcone.. The character Connie James (Gemma Jones), also sang it in the British television series Spooks.
