= Emile Pandolfi =

American pianist (born 1946)

Emile Pandolfi (born 1946) is an American pianist. He is noted for his renditions of show tunes, as well as his renditions of classical music.

== Background ==
Pandolfi was born in New York and grew up in Greenville, South Carolina, where he still resides. He began studying piano at the age of five, and made his symphonic debut with the Greenville Symphony Orchestra at age 14, performing the Mozart piano concerto no. 11 in F major, K 413.

He attended Greenville High School, then Furman University, where he did his preparatory studies in music. He transferred to Baylor University, where he studied for two years. Following his piano teacher, Thomas Redcay, he transferred to Texas Tech, where he earned his Bachelor of Music degree.

After college, Pandolfi moved to St Thomas in the US Virgin Islands for two years as a chorus teacher in a public school. In the evenings, he played at the Caribbean Beach Hotel, as part of a Calypso band called "The Castaways." From there, he moved to Sussex, England for another two years, playing in pubs and restaurants.

== Career ==
Upon returning to the United States, Pandolfi spent two years in Denver as part of a house band, Buddy Brown and the Bittersuite, and then moved to Los Angeles, where he played for dance classes, acting seminars, actor/singer auditions, and in various piano lounges. It was here that he became one of the house pianists for the Comedy Store. He worked there for six years, performing with such entertainers as Jay Leno, David Letterman, and Robin Williams, among others. He was a featured performer at the 1984 Summer Olympics, playing "Rhapsody in Blue." During this time, he also studied comedy writing (an ability he was to use many years later to write his own show) and learned to play for comedy improv.

After spending 15 years in LA, Pandolfi moved with his family back to Greenville, where he created his recording label, MagicMusic Productions. His first recording, "By Request" is a compilation of Broadway and movie themes arranged for piano solo. It remains his top-selling album to date, with sales in excess of six hundred thousand units. Pandolfi has strong followings on Spotify, Apple Music, Pandora, and all the major streaming sites.

As a classically trained musician, Pandolfi had to teach himself to play music by ear.

Pandolfi has been actively involved with charity organizations, performing in benefit concerts for Hospice, several South Carolina women's shelters, The Ara Parseghian Foundation (Neimann-Pick Type C disease), United Way, The Red Cross, The American Heart Association, and others.

== Musical influences ==
Pandolfi's greatest musical influences are the Romantic classical French composer Claude Debussy, the classical Polish composer Frederic Chopin, and the 20th century Russian composer Sergei Rachmaninoff.

== Personal life ==
Emile has two living sisters, Pamela Pandolfi and Barbara Coventry; and a brother, Guy Pandolfi.

Emile and his wife Judy have three daughters.

== Discography ==
- By Request -1990
- An Affair to Remember -1991
- Remember Me -1992
- Once Upon a Romance -1992
- Nights on Broadway -1993
- Country Impressions -1994
- Some Enchanted Evening -1994
- It Might as Well Be Spring -1995
- Chopin -1996
- My Foolish Heart -1997
- The Second Time Around -1997
- Evening in Venice -1999
- What a Wonderful World -1999
- Rhapsody in Blue -2000
- Malaguena - Ritual Fire Dance
- Days of Wine & Roses -2004
- Starry Starry Night -2002
- Secret Love -1995
- Unforgettable Love Songs -1998
- Evening Romance -1999
- A Child's Gift of Lullabyes
- Believe
- Quiet Passion
- A Lovely Way to Spend An Evening
- Live - In Concert
- Pandolfi Plays the Musicals
- Malagueña/Ritual Fire Dance
- How Sweet the Sound
- Maleguena
- So This is Love
- I See the Light

=== Compilation albums ===
- Please Welcome... Best of Volume 1 - 1993
- Secret Love: The Best of Emile Pandolfi, Vol. 2 -1996

=== Christmas albums ===
- White Christmas
- Sleigh Ride
- Do You Hear What I Hear?
- In the Holiday Spirit
- Winter Wonderland
