= Non Dimenticar =

1951 Gino Redi song

"Non Dimenticar" ("Do Not Forget") is the Italian construction for the informal imperative, "non" + infinitive. Originally titled "T'ho voluto bene" ("I loved you so much"), it is a popular song with music by P. G. Redi (Gino Redi, a.k.a. Luigi Pulci), the original Italian lyrics by Michele Galdieri, with English lyrics by Shelley Dobbins. The song was written for the 1951 film Anna (directed by Alberto Lattuada). While actress Silvana Mangano is frequently credited as the singer, in fact, Flo Sandon's dubbed the two songs sung in Anna (the singer retained the apostrophe in her name which was the result of a misprint on her first album cover).

The English adaptation was written by Shelly Dobbins in 1954 with the title "Non Dimenticar".

== Title Derivation ==
The actual verb in Italian is "dimenticare", but Italian often contracts words, especially in lyrics and poetry. Common verbs like fare (to do) and avere (to have) are often spoken and written as far and aver. In a typical example, the renowned playwright and author Pirandello wrote a short story Lumie di Sicilia ("Citrons from Sicily"). In only the twelve pages of the story, twelve infinitives appear without the final letter e: guardar, trattar, vincer, tentennar, abbandonar, spiccicar, correr, star (three times), frenar and accampar. In addition, conjugated verb forms can have their final letter dropped. In this example, parevan(o) and c'eran(o). There's a noun odor(e) and there are two adverbs as well, ancor(a) and fin(o). The hard and fast rule governing the Italian word for ′′sir′′ or ′′mister′′ is ′′signore′′: when used immediately preceding a name, the final ′′e′′ is dropped.

== Recordings ==
- The best-known recording of the song was by Nat King Cole, reaching number 45 on the Billboard magazine charts in 1958.
- Jerry Vale's version was included in his 1963 album "Arriverderci, Roma" LP
- Dean Martin on his 1962 album Dino: Italian Love Songs.
- Peggy Lee for her 1961 album Olé ala Lee.
- Connie Francis on her 1959 album Sings Italian Favorites
