= Sobre las olas (film) =

1950 Mexican film directed by Ismael Rodríguez

- Directed by: Ismael Rodríguez
- Written by: Ismael Rodríguez; Rogelio González; Pedro de Urdimalas
- Starring: Pedro Infante; Beatriz Aguirre; Andrés Soler
- Cinematography: Jack Draper
- Edited by: Fernando Martínez
- Music by: Raúl Lavista
- Production company: Producciones Rodríguez Hermanos
- Release date: 13 September 1950
- Running time: 128 minutes
- Country: Mexico
- Language: Spanish

Sobre las olas (English: Over the Waves) is a 1950 Mexican musical biographical film directed by Ismael Rodríguez and starring Pedro Infante, Beatriz Aguirre and Andrés Soler. It portrays the life of the composer Juventino Rosas.

== Cast ==
- Pedro Infante as Juventino Rosas
- Beatriz Aguirre as Lolita
- Andrés Soler as Don Marcial Morales
- Prudencia Grifell as Doña Calixta Gutiérrez de Alfaro
- Antonio R. Frausto as Porfirio Díaz
- Miguel Manzano as Juan de Dios
- Beatriz Jimeno as Doña Carmelita Romero Rubio de Díaz
- Bertha Lomelí as Ángela Peralta
- Alicia Neira as Dolores
- José Luis Jiménez as Pepe Reyna
- Armando Acosta as Espectador teatro
- Norma Ancira
- Daniel Arroyo as Invitado en reunión
- Guillermo Bravo Sosa as Invitado a reunión
- Emilio Brillas as Anunciador en fiesta de palacio
- Jorge Chesterking as Invitado en reunión
- José Chávez as Invitado fiesta de palacio con turbante
- Roberto Corell as Mayer, prestamista
- Julio Daneri as Embajador de Turquia
- Manuel de la Vega as Invitado en reunión
- Irma Dorantes as Invitada a baile de palacio
- Pedro Elviro as Levy, prestamista
- Edmundo Espino
- Magdalena Estrada as Pajarera
- Mario García 'Harapos' as Invitado a baile
- Carmen Guillén as Invitada en fiesta de palacio
- Leonor Gómez as Asistente de partera
- Elodia Hernández as Invitada en fiesta de palacio
- Carmen Manzano as Vendedora de flores
- Blanca Marroquín as Macaria, sirvienta
- Paco Martínez as Invitado en fiesta de palacio
- Pepe Martínez as Invitado en reunión
- Héctor Mateos
- Esteban Márquez as Roberto
- José Pardavé as Espectador concierto
- Salvador Quiroz as Teniente
- Emma Rodríguez as Invitada a concierto
- Humberto Rodríguez as Empleado de palacio
- Félix Samper as Espectador teatro
- María Luisa Smith as Madre de Juventino
- Manuel Sánchez Navarro as Mensajero de presidente
- Dolores Tinoco as Partera
- Alfonso Torres as Anunciador fecha conmemorativa
- Pastor Torres
- Manuel Trejo Morales as Capitán de barco
- María Valdealde as Invitada a baile de palacio

== Bibliography ==
- Heredia, Juanita. Transnational Latina Narratives in the Twenty-first Century. Palgrave Macmillan, 2009.
