= Connie Francis Sings Jewish Favorites =

Connie Francis sings Jewish Favorites

Studio album by Connie Francis
- Released: October 1960
- Recorded: July 13, 15, 17, 20 & 23, 1960
- Genre: Pop
- Length: 36:08
- Label: MGM Records; E-3869 (mono)/SE-3869 (stereo)
- Producer: Arnold Maxin

Connie Francis chronology
| Connie Francis sings Spanish And Latin American Favorites (1960) | Connie Francis sings Jewish Favorites (1960) | More Italian Favorites (1960) |

Professional ratings
Review scores
| Source | Rating |
|---|---|
| Allmusic | 4/5 stars |

Connie Francis Sings Jewish Favorites is a studio album of Jewish songs recorded by American entertainer Connie Francis.

== Background ==
After the success of her 1959 album Connie Francis Sings Italian Favorites (which remained on the album charts for 81 weeks and peaked at number four), Francis decided to release more albums which appealed to immigrant communities in the United States.

In July 1960, Francis was in Hollywood for the interior shots of her first motion picture Where The Boys Are which made it impossible for her to record the album during live sessions at EMI's famous Abbey Road Studios in London, as she had done with Connie Francis Sings Italian Favorites. Hence, the playbacks to these songs were pre-recorded in London under the supervision of Francis' British producer Norman Newell, and were conducted by Brian Fahey. The tapes containing these playbacks were shipped to Hollywood, where Francis overdubbed her vocals.

According to Ron Roberts, all the recording dates and titles included in the 1975 edition of his series of Connie Francis discographies were faithful copies of sessions logs compiled at the time by Connie herself. The entire Jewish album was recorded at EMI's Abbey Road studios, together with her preceding release, Connie Francis Sings Spanish & Latin American Favorites, and the subsequent album More Italian Favorites. It was the last album that could not be completed during the July sessions, and final tracks by Connie were cut in September 1960.

Francis, who had grown up in an Italian-Jewish neighborhood in Newark, spoke Yiddish fluently and was familiar with songs in Hebrew, which prompted her to record the songs either entirely in Yiddish or Hebrew or bilingually, with a few lines sung in English.

The album was originally released in October 1960 under the catalogue numbers E-3869 (mono pressings) and SE-3869 (stereo) on MGM Records. The album consisted of 12 songs, although 13 playbacks had been produced. However, conflicts with Francis' busy schedule of filming, recording for other markets and public appearances led to her not overdubbing vocals for her rendition of "Eli, Eli".

According to Ron Roberts, Francis did record "Eli Eli" in London during the Jewish album sessions and it had not been deferred because of other schedules. The backing track to this and several tapes of Connie's London sessions were discovered in the EMI vaults when the MGM Records label was taken over by Polydor. Francis eventually utilised the backing track in 1983 when she recorded a new vocal.

== Track listing ==
Side A
| No. | Title | Writer(s) | Length |
|---|---|---|---|
| 1. | "Tzena, Tzena, Tzena" | Issachar Miron, Yechiel Chagiz | 1:54 |
| 2. | "My Yiddishe Momme" | Jack Yellen, Lew Pollack | 4:08 |
| 3. | "I Love You Much Too Much" (Ich hob dich zifeel lieb) | Alexander Olshanetsky, Chaim Towber | 3:16 |
| 4. | "Shein vi di Levone" | Joseph Rumshinsky | 2:01 |
| 5. | "Mein Shtetele Belz" | Alexander Olshanetsky | 3:03 |
| 6. | "O mein Papa" | Paul Burkhard, John Turner, Geoffrey Parsons | 3:24 |

Side B
| No. | Title | Writer(s) | Length |
|---|---|---|---|
| 1. | "Anniversary Song" | Iosif Ivanovici, Al Jolson, Saul Chaplin, Chaim Tauber | 2:56 |
| 2. | "Oifen pripetchik" | Mark Warshawsky | 2:48 |
| 3. | "Havah Negilah" | Traditional | 2:56 |
| 4. | "Yossel, Yossel" | Nellie Casman, Samuel Shteinberg | 2:29 |
| 5. | "Wus Geven Is Geven" | David Meyerowitz | 3:16 |
| 6. | "Mom-e-le" | Aaron Goodhart, Mitchell Parish | 3:58 |
