= Juventino Rosas =

Mexican composer and violinist (1868–1894)

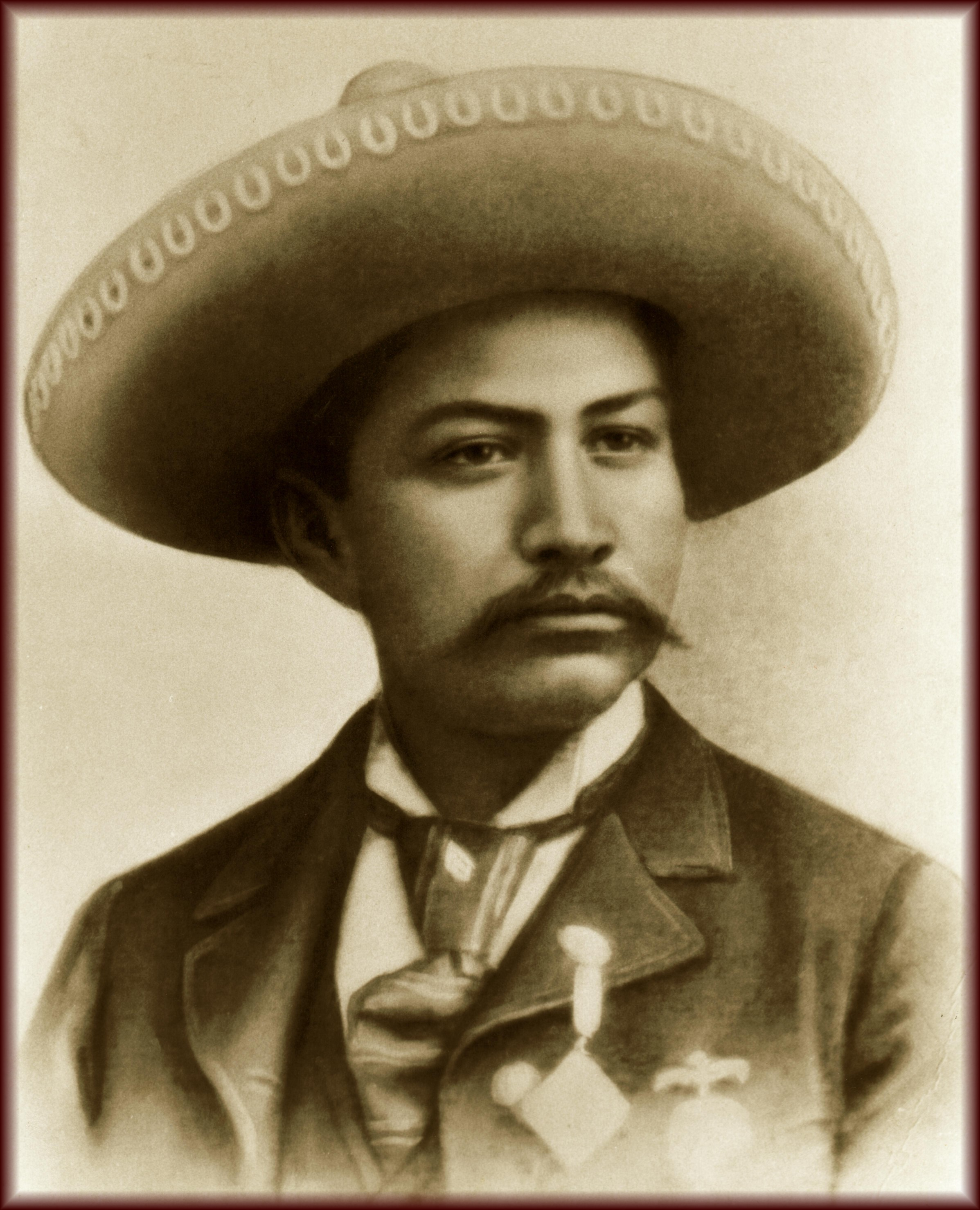
Juventino Rosas 1894

José Juventino Policarpo Rosas Cadenas (25 January 1868 – 9 July 1894) was a Mexican composer and violinist, known worldwide for the waltz "Sobre las olas" ("Over the Waves").

== Life and career ==
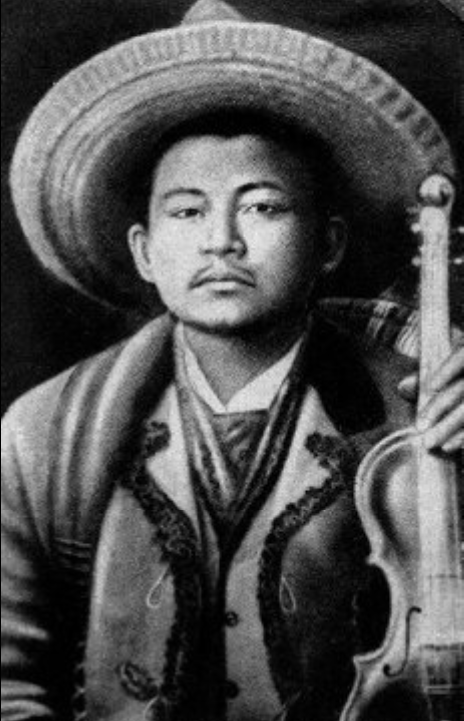
Photo of Juventino Rosas, in 1890.

Rosas was born in Santa Cruz, Guanajuato, later renamed Santa Cruz de Galeana, Guanajuato, and still later into Santa Cruz de Juventino Rosas. Rosas began his musical career as a street musician, playing with dance music bands in Mexico City. In 1884-85 and 1888 he enrolled into the conservatory, both times leaving it without taking any examination.

Most of Rosas's compositions—among them "Sobre las Olas" ("Over the Waves")—were issued by Wagner y Levien and Nagel Sucesores in Mexico City.

In the late 1880s, Rosas is reported to have been a member of a military band, and in 1891 he worked in Michoacán. In 1892–93 Rosas lived near Monterrey before joining an orchestra in 1893 for a tour through the USA. During this tour, the group performed at the World Columbian Exposition World's Fair in Chicago, Illinois.

In 1894, Rosas went for a several-month tour to Cuba with an Italian-Mexican ensemble, where he came down with major health problems, having to stay behind in Surgidero de Batabanó. As a result of spinal myelitis, he died there at the age of 26. Fifteen years later, in 1909, his remains were brought back to Mexico.

Rosas is one of the best known Mexican composers of salon music, as well as the one with the highest number of editions abroad and of sound recordings, the first of them released in 1898. Rosas's best known work is "Sobre las Olas" or "Over the Waves". It was first published in Mexico in 1888. It remains popular as a classic waltz, and has also found its way into New Orleans Jazz, Bluegrass Music, Country and Western music and Tejano music. In the United States "Sobre las Olas" has a cultural association with funfairs, ice skating, circuses and trapeze artists, as it was one of the tunes available for Wurlitzer's popular line of fairground organs. The music was used for the tune "The Loveliest Night of the Year", which was sung by Ann Blyth in MGM's film The Great Caruso. It remains still popular with country and old-time fiddlers in the United States.

The 1950 film Over the Waves was based on his life.

== Compositions (first editions) ==
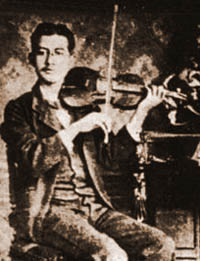
Juventino Rosas (approx. 1890)

=== Waltzes ===
- Sobre las Olas (1888)
- Ensueño seductor ("Impassioned Dream", 1892)
- Carmen (1880s)
- Aurora (1890)
- Josefina (1892)
- Flores de Margarita (1893)
- Eva (1888-1891)
- Amelia (1890)
- Dos pensamientos (1888)
- Illusions juveniles (1890)
- Soledad (1893)

=== Polkas ===
- La cantinera (1888, A. Wagner y Levien, Mexico City / Friedrich Hofmeister, Leipzig)
- Carmela (1890, A. Wagner y Levien, Mexico City / Friedrich Hofmeister, Leipzig)
- Ojos negros (1891, A. Wagner y Levien, Mexico City / Friedrich Hofmeister, Leipzig)
- Flores de México (1893, Eduardo Gariel, Saltillo / Robert Forberg, Leipzig)

=== Mazurkas ===
- Acuérdate (before 1888, A. Wagner y Levien, Mexico City)
- Lejos de ti (before 1888, H. Nagl. Sucs.)
- Juanita (1890, A. Wagner y Levien Sucs., Mexico City / Friedrich Hofmeister, Leipzig)
- Último adiós (1899, A. Wagner y Levien Sucs., Mexico City / Friedrich Hofmeister, Leies

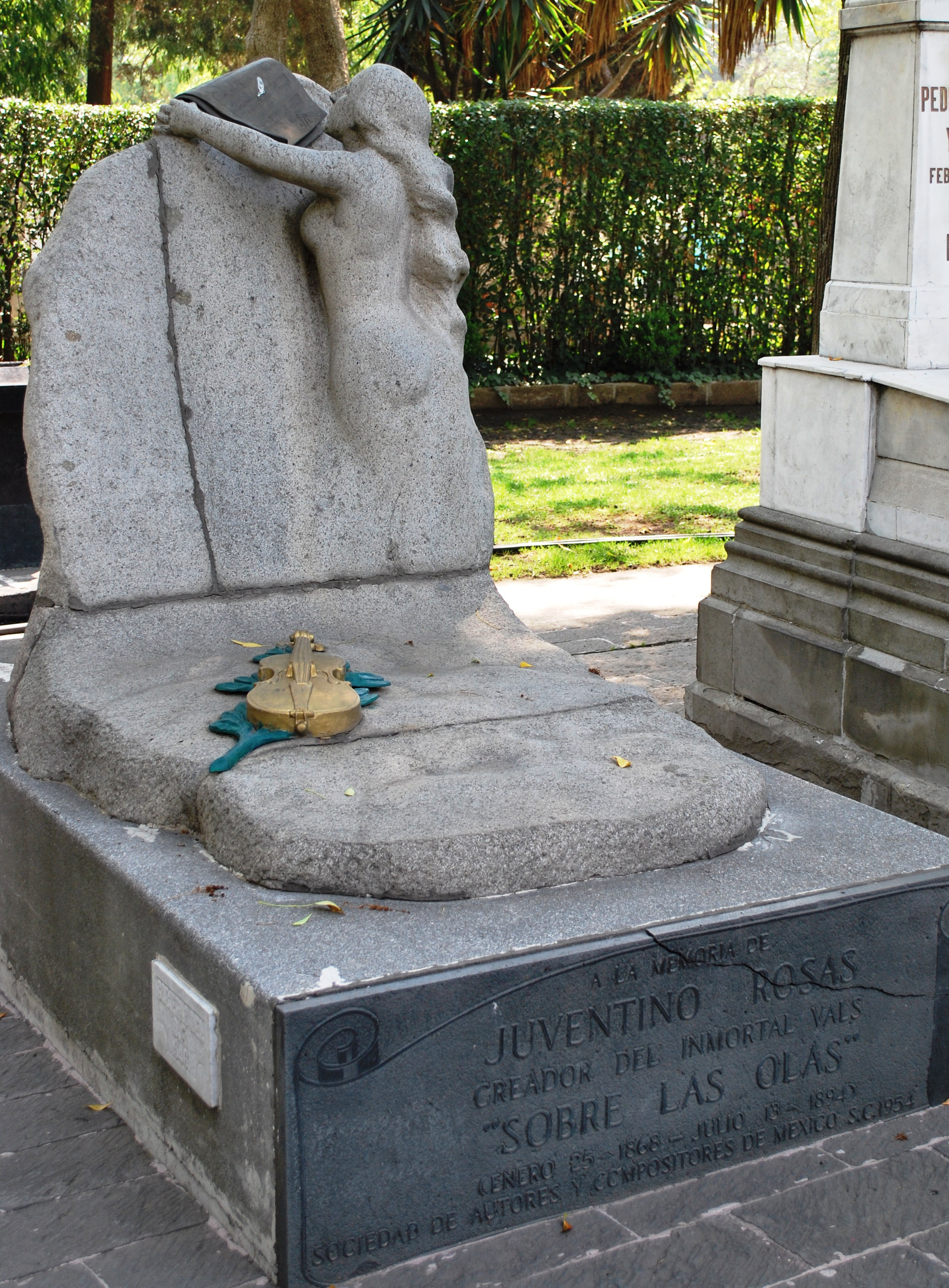
Tomb of Juventino Rosas in the Panteon Civil de Dolores cemetery in Mexico City

- El sueño de las flores (before 1888, A. Wagner y Levien, Mexico City / Friedrich Hofmeister, Leipzig)
- Floricultura-Schottisch (before 1888, A. Wagner y Levien, Mexico City / Friedrich Hofmeister, Leipzig)
- Lazos de amor (1888, A. Wagner y Levien Sucs., Mexico City / Friedrich Hofmeister, Leipzig)
- Julia (1890, A. Wagner y Levien Sucs., Mexico City / Friedrich Hofmeister, Leipzig)
- Salud y pesetas (1890, A. Wagner y Levien Sucs., Mexico City / Friedrich Hofmeister, Leipzig)
- Juventa (1892, A. Wagner y Levien Sucs., Mexico City / Friedrich Hofmeister, Leipzig)
- El espirituano (1894, Autograph Archivo Provincial de Sancti Spíritus, Kuba)

=== Danzas ===
- A Lupe (1888, A. Wagner y Levien, Mexico City / Friedrich Hofmeister, Leipzig)
- En el casino (1888, A. Wagner y Levien, Mexico City / Friedrich Hofmeister, Leipzig)
- Juanita (1888, A. Wagner y Levien, Mexico City / Friedrich Hofmeister, Leipzig)
- No me acuerdo (1888, A. Wagner y Levien, Mexico City / Friedrich Hofmeister, Leipzig)
- ¡Qué bueno! (1888, A. Wagner y Levien, Mexico City / Friedrich Hofmeister, Leipzig)
- ¿Y para qué? (1888, A. Wagner y Levien, Mexico City / Friedrich Hofmeister, Leipzig)
- Flores de Romana (1893, Eduardo Gariel, Saltillo)

== Bibliography ==
- Hugo Barreiro Lastra: Los días cubanos de Juventino Rosas, Guanajuato 1994
- Helmut Brenner: Juventino Rosas, His Life, His Work, His Time (=Detroit Monographs in Musicology/Studies in Music 32), Warren, Michigan 2000
- Jesús Rodríguez Frausto: Juventino Rosas. Notas nuevas sobre su vidaGuanajuato
