= Gino Redi =

Italian composer

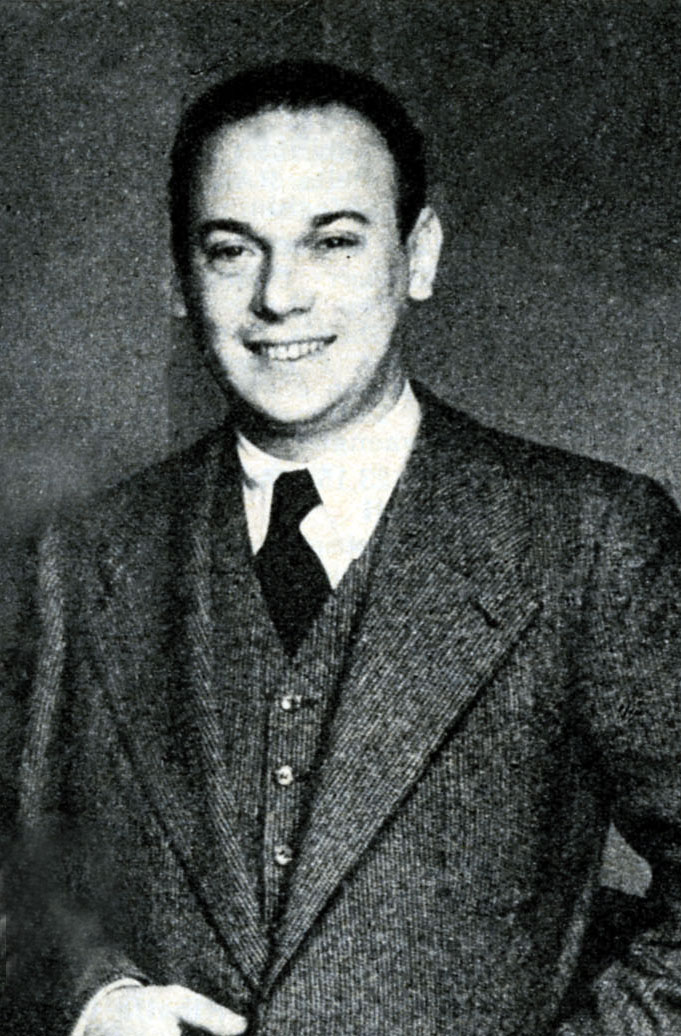
- Born: 26 November 1908; Rome, Italy
- Died: 27 September 1962 (aged 53); Rome, Italy

Gino Redi (26 November 1908 – 27 September 1962) was an Italian composer. He was sometimes credited as P.G. Redi.

== Biography ==
Born Luigi Pulci in Rome, after graduating in composition at the Conservatory of Parma, Redi moved to Milan where he was active as a conductor for several small orchestras. In 1934 he started composing, debuting with the song "È finito il bel tempo che fu".

Starting from the second half of the 1930s Redi was one of the most successful songwriters of his time. Among his best known songs are "Perché non sognar", "Aggio perduto 'o suonno" and "Non Dimenticar". He participated to four editions of the Sanremo Music Festival between 1951 and 1961.
