= Sanremo Music Festival 1958 =

Italian song contest (8th edition)

Dates and venue
- Semi-final 1: 30 January 1958
- Semi-final 2: 31 January 1958
- Final: 1 February 1958
- Venue: Sanremo Casino; Sanremo, Italy

Organisation
- Organiser: Società ATA

Production
- Broadcaster: Radiotelevisione italiana (RAI)
- Director: Vittorio Brignole
- Musical director: Cinico Angelini and Alberto Semprini
- Artistic director: Achille Cajafa
- Presenters: Gianni Agus and Fulvia Colombo

Vote
- Number of entries: 20
- Winner: "Nel blu, dipinto di blu" Domenico Modugno and Johnny Dorelli

The Sanremo Music Festival 1958 (Italian: Festival di Sanremo 1958), officially the 8th Italian Song Festival (8º Festival della canzone italiana), was the eight annual Sanremo Music Festival, held at the Sanremo Casino in Sanremo between 30 January and 1 February 1958. It was organised by Società ATA, concessionary of the Sanremo Casino, and broadcast by Radiotelevisione italiana (RAI). Achille Cajafa was the artistic director of the festival. The show was presented by actor Gianni Agus, assisted by television announcer Fulvia Colombo.

According to the rules of this edition every song was performed in a double performance by a couple of singers or groups, with some artists performing multiple songs. The winner of the festival was "Nel blu, dipinto di blu", performed by Domenico Modugno (who was also the composer of the song) and Johnny Dorelli. Modugno went on to perform the song for Italy at the Eurovision Song Contest 1958.

== Competing entries ==
A submission window for Italian music publishing firms was opened by Società ATA from October 1957 to 15 November 1957. Only songs in Italian, with dialects excluded, and by songwriters of Italian nationality were eligible. About 1,000 songs were submitted for this edition. Twenty of them were selected by a jury composed of Alessandro Cicognini, Raffaele Gervasio, Adriano Grande, Angelo Francesco Lavagnino, Nicola Lisi, Federico Petriccione, Nino Piccinelli, Giuseppe Piccioli Arrigo Polillo, and Achille Cajafa, with Carlo Alberto Cappelli acting as the president of the jury. Initially foreseen as jury members, Oliviero De Fabritiis and Renzo Rossellini were replaced by Giuseppe Piccioli and Achille Cajafa.

Competing entries
Song	Composer	Lyricist	Publishing firm
"Amare un'altra"	Fabio Borgazzi	Riccardo Pazzaglia	Titanus
"Arsura"	Mario Schisa	Bixio Cherubini; Vincenzo D'Acquisto	Asso
"Campana di Santa Lucia"	Carlo Concina	Bixio Cherubini	Casiroli
"Cos'è un bacio"	Giampiero Boneschi	Vincenzo Rovi	Araldo
"È molto facile... dirsi addio"	Luigi Martelli	Luigi Martelli; Ennio Neri	Derevitzki
"Fantastica"	Piero Bentivoglìo	Armando Costanzi	Alma
"Fragole e cappellini"	Saverio Seracini	Saverio Seracini	Suvini Zerboni
"Giuro d'amarti così"	Vittorio Mascheroni	Mario Panzeri	Mascheroni
"Ho disegnato un cuore"	Isabella Piga	Silvana Simoni	Peter Schaeffers
"Io sono te"	Carlo Alberto Rossi	Alberto Testa	Tre Stelle
"I trulli di Alberobello"	Umberto Bindi	Giovanni Ciocca	Santa Cecilia
"La canzone che piace a te"	Mario Ruccione	Raffaele Cutolo	Marechiaro
"L'edera"	Saverio Seracini	Vincenzo D'Acquisto	Menestrello
"Mille volte"	Fabio Borgazzi		Ministrel
"Nel blu, dipinto di blu"	Domenico Modugno	Franco Migliacci	Music Union
"Non potrai dimenticare"	Gualtiero Malgoni	Bruno Pallesi	Southern Music
"Nozze d'oro"	Giorgio Cavalli; Enrico Canelli	Franco Conti	Unione
"Se tornassi tu"	Alberto Barberis	Ezio Radaelli	Ata
"Timida serenata"	Gino Redi	Nisa	Le canzoni del mare
"Tu sei del mio paese"	Carlo Alberto Rossi	Biri; Alberto Testa; Raoul De Giusti	C.A. Rossi

After the selection of the entries, the songs were matched with the artists in a way to guarantee the best possible interpretation for each song. Each of the participating artists was paid a fee of 70,000 lire per night. Originally selected, Fiorella Bini was replaced by Cristina Jorio, and Fausto Cigliano by Giorgio Consolini. Rehearsals started on 25 January 1958. Tickets for 7000 lire each went on sale on 29 January 1958 and were sold out within two hours.

== Contest overview ==
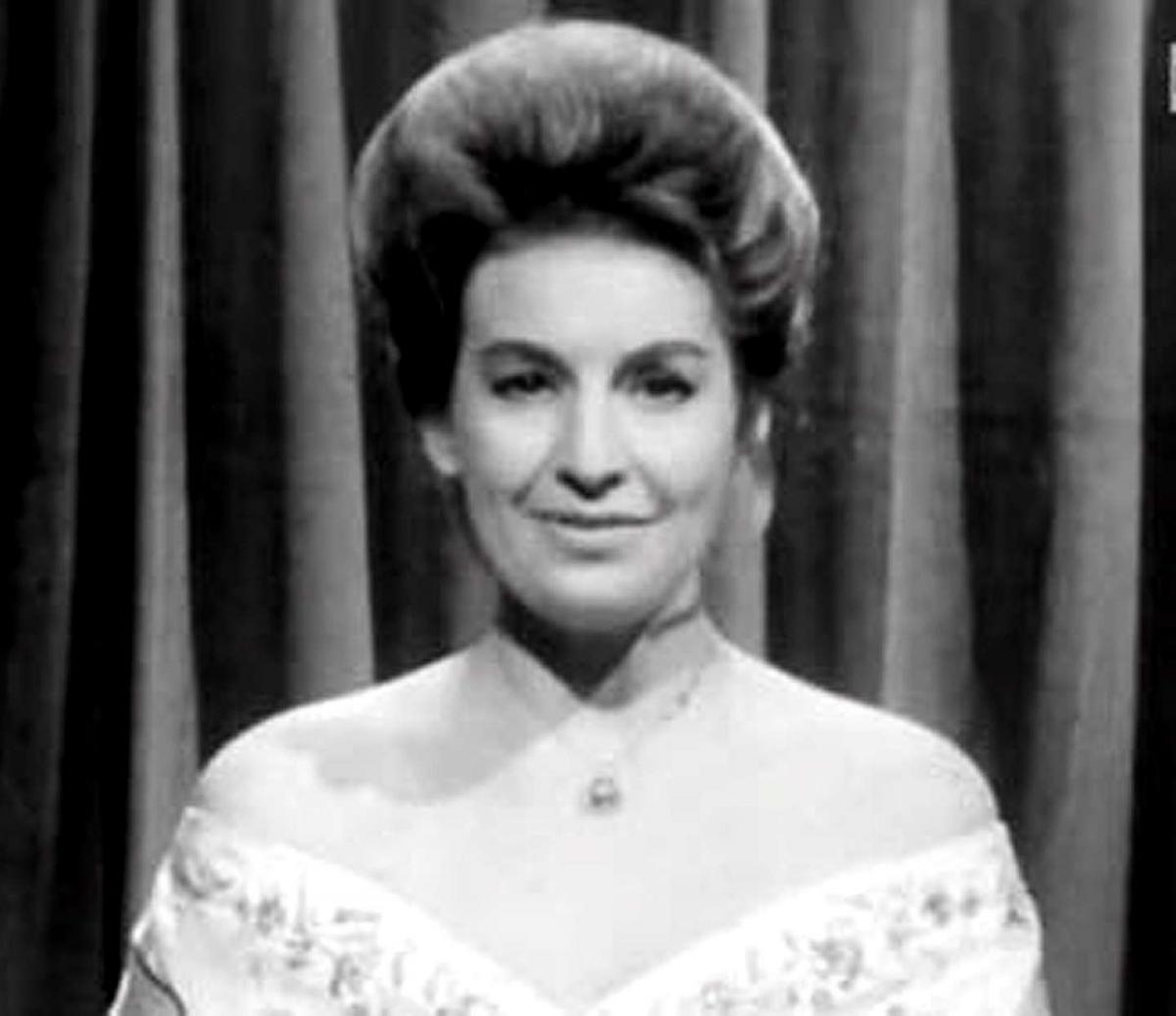
Fulvia Colombo hosting the festival

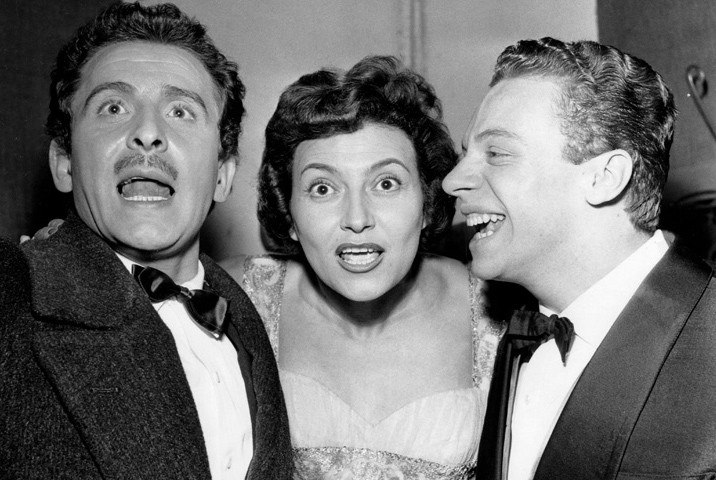
Left to right: Domenico Modugno, Nilla Pizzi and Johnny Dorelli

The shows were directed by Vittorio Brignole. The presenters were Gianni Agus and Fulvia Colombo. Initially, Enzo Tortora had been announced as presenter but he was replaced by Agus shortly before the start of the festival.

Each song was performed twice, once in a more traditional arrangement with an 14-piece orchestra under the direction of Cinico Angelini and once in a more rhythmical arrangement by the Sestetto Azzurro under the direction of Alberto Semprini. In addition, a recap of the songs was played on a player piano. In the semi-finals, the five entries qualifying for the final were repeated at the end of the program.

=== Semi-final 1 ===
The first semi-final was held on 30 January 1958 at 22:00 CET. From this semi-final, five songs qualified for the final. Gloria Christian, initially foreseen to sing "Timida serenata" in duet with Aurelio Fierro, missed the night due to sickness. In the semi-finals, the finalists were chosen by a jury of 200 audience members, drawn by lot prior to each show from ticketholders present at the venue. Each juror could vote for a maximum of two songs.

Qualifier

Semi-final 1 – 30 January 1958
R/O	Song	Artist with orchestra Angelini	Artist with orchestra Semprini	Votes	Place
1	"È molto facile... dirsi addio"	Marisa Del Frate	Giorgio Consolini	9	10
2	"Mille volte"	Tonina Torrielli	Cristina Jorio	21	4
3	"Timida serenata"	Gino Latilla and Carla Boni	Aurelio Fierro	25	3
4	"Giuro d'amarti così"	Claudio Villa	Nilla Pizzi	34	2
5	"Fantastica"	Johnny Dorelli	Natalino Otto	20	5
6	"Nozze d'oro"	Tonina Torrielli and Duo Fasano	Trio Joyce	14	8
7	"Se tornassi tu"	Johnny Dorelli	Giorgio Consolini	12	9
8	"Fragole e cappellini"	Claudio Villa and Duo Fasano	Aurelio Fierro	43	1
9	"Tu sei del mio paese"	Gino Latilla	Natalino Otto	18	6
10	"Arsura"	Carla Boni	Giorgio Consolini	17	7

=== Semi-final 2 ===
The second semi-final was held on 31 January 1958 at 22:00 CET. From this semi-final, also five songs qualified for the final. Each juror could vote for a maximum of two songs.

In order to influence the results of the audience jury, composer Mario Ruccione had given tickets to people willing to vote for his song "La canzone che piace a te". On the night of the second semi-final, staff of the Sanremo casino noticed some spectators with pre-filled voting sheets, these were declared invalid during the voting. Upon not reaching the final, Ruccione claimed 20 million lire as a compensation. His claims were rejected by Achille Cajafa, head of the Sanremo casino and artistic director of the festival.

Qualifier

Semi-final 2 – 31 January 1958
R/O	Song	Artist with orchestra Semprini	Artist with orchestra Angelini	Votes	Place
1	"Amare un'altra"	Nilla Pizzi	Gino Latilla	48	4
2	"Ho disegnato un cuore"	Gloria Christian	Marisa Del Frate	16	9
3	"La canzone che piace a te"	Aurelio Fierro and Nilla Pizzi	Claudio Villa and Duo Fasano	26	6
4	"I trulli di Alberobello"	Aurelio Fierro and Trio Joyce	Tonina Torrielli and Duo Fasano	20	7
5	"Campana di Santa Lucia"	Giorgio Consolini	Claudio Villa	38	5
6	"L'edera"	Nilla Pizzi	Tonina Torrielli	62	2
7	"Cos'è un bacio"	Gloria Christian	Claudio Villa and Gino Latilla	18	8
8	"Io sono te"	Cristina Jorio	Carla Boni	10	10
9	"Nel blu dipinto di blu"	Domenico Modugno	Johnny Dorelli	88	1
10	"Non potrai dimenticare"	Natalino Otto	Carla Boni and Gino Latilla	51	3

=== Final ===
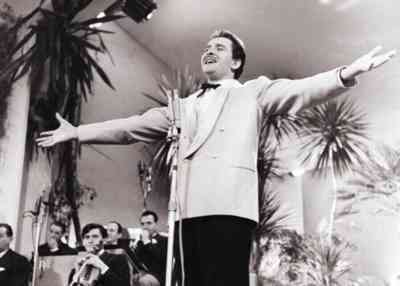
Domenico Modugno performing the winning song

In the final, an audience jury of 100 people together with another 100 jurors drawn by lot from national newspaper subscribers decided the winner. Each juror could cast one vote for their favourite song. At the end of the final, the top three songs were performed again. The victory of more modern songs and especially of Domenico Modugno, who was considered an outsider, was seen as revolutionary in the festival.

Final – 1 February 1958
Song	Artist(s)		Place
"Nel blu, dipinto di blu"	Domenico Modugno	Johnny Dorelli	1
"L'edera"	Nilla Pizzi	Tonina Torrielli	2
"Amare un'altra"	Gino Latilla	Nilla Pizzi	3
"Campana di Santa Lucia"	Claudio Villa	Giorgio Consolini	4
"Giuro d'amarti così"	Claudio Villa	Nilla Pizzi	5
"Timida serenata"	Carla Boni and Gino Latilla	Aurelio Fierro and Gloria Christian	6
"Fragole e cappellini"	Claudio Villa and Duo Fasano	Aurelio Fierro ft. Trio Joyce	7
"Non potrai dimenticare"	Natalino Otto	Carla Boni and Gino Latilla	8
"Mille volte"	Tonina Torrielli	Cristina Jorio	9
"Fantastica"	Johnny Dorelli	Natalino Otto	10

== Broadcasts ==
=== Local broadcast ===
All shows were broadcast on Italian Television and Secondo Programma, beginning at 22:00 CET. The broadcasts had an estimated audience of ten million people.

=== International broadcasts ===
Known details on the broadcasts of the final in each country, including the specific broadcasting stations are shown in the tables below.

International broadcasters of the Sanremo Music Festival 1958 Final
Country	Broadcaster	Channel(s)	Commentator(s)	Ref(s)
Austria	ORF	Österreichisches Fernsehen		
Belgium	NIR	NIR	Piet te Nuyl Jr.	
Denmark	Statsradiofonien	Statsradiofonien TV		
Germany	ARD	Deutsches Fernsehen		
Monaco	Radio Monte-Carlo			
Netherlands	NTS	NTS	Piet te Nuyl Jr.	
Switzerland	SRG SSR	TV DRS		
Switzerland	SRG SSR	TSR	Georges Hardy	
