= Sanremo Music Festival 1953 =

Italian song contest (3rd edition)

Dates and venue
- Semi-final 1: 29 January 1953
- Semi-final 2: 30 January 1953
- Final: 31 January 1953
- Venue: Sanremo Casino; Sanremo, Italy

Organisation
- Broadcaster: Radio Audizioni Italiane (RAI)
- Musical director: Cinico Angelini
- Presenters: Nunzio Filogamo

Vote
- Number of entries: 20
- Winner: "Viale d'autunno" Carla Boni and Flo Sandon's

The Sanremo Music Festival 1953 (Italian: Festival di Sanremo 1953), officially the 3rd Italian Song Festival (3º Festival della canzone italiana), was the third annual Sanremo Music Festival, held at the Sanremo Casino in Sanremo between 29 and 31 January 1953, and broadcast by Radio Audizioni Italiane (RAI). The show was presented by Nunzio Filogamo.

According to the rules of this edition every song was performed in a double performance by a couple of singers or groups, with some artists performing multiple songs. The winner of the festival was "Viale d'autunno", performed by Carla Boni and Flo Sandon's.

== Participants and results ==
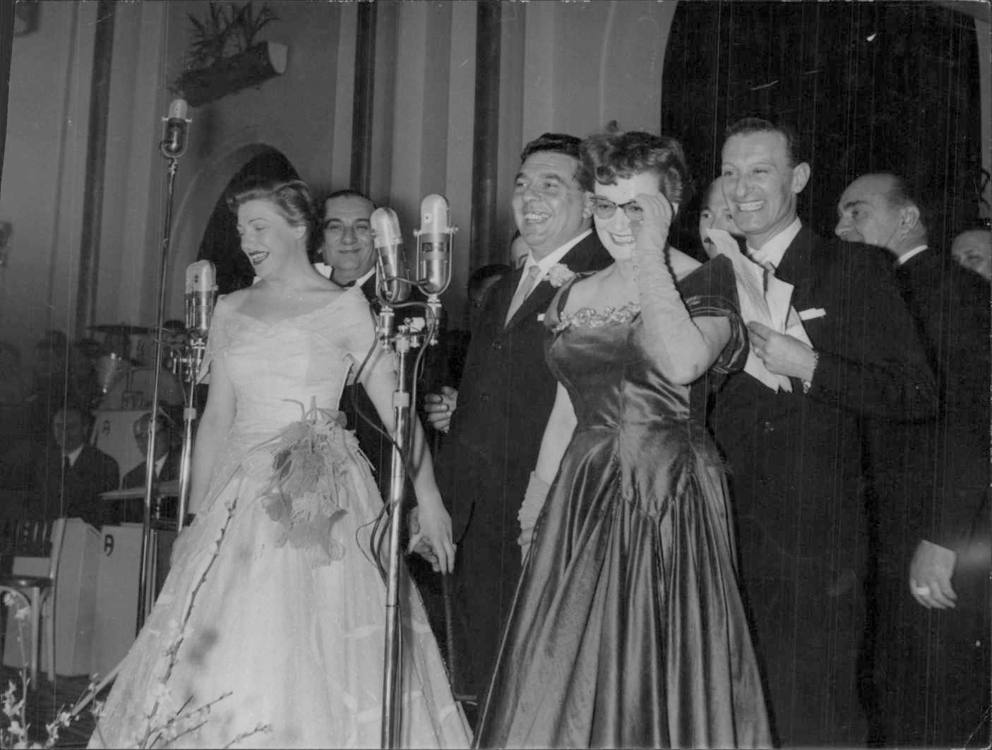
Winning singers Flo Sandon's and Carla Boni with composer Giovanni D'Anzi and presenter Nunzio Filogamo (right)

Participants and results
Song	Artist(s)		Songwriter(s)	Rank
"Viale d'autunno"	Carla Boni	Flo Sandon's	Giovanni D’Anzi	1
"Campanaro"	Nilla Pizzi and Doppio Quintetto Vocale	Teddy Reno and Quartetto Stars	Bixio Cherubini; Carlo Concina	2
"Vecchio scarpone"	Gino Latilla and Doppio Quintetto Vocale	Giorgio Consolini	Calibi; Pinchi; Carlo Donida	3 (ex aequo)
"Lasciami cantare una canzone"	Achille Togliani	Teddy Reno	Michele Cozzoli; Cesare Andrea Bixio	3 (ex aequo)
"Vecchia villa comunale"	Gino Latilla	Giorgio Consolini	Renato Ruocco; Nino Oliviero	5
"No, Pierrot"	Achille Togliani	Katyna Ranieri	Armando Costanzo; Renato Salani	6
"Il passerotto"	Carla Boni and Doppio Quintetto Vocale	Quartetto Stars	Eldo Di Lazzaro; Dante Valentini	7
"Sussurrando buonanotte"	Nilla Pizzi and Doppio Quintetto Vocale	Teddy Reno and Quartetto Stars	Danpa; Bruno Pallesi; Virgilio Panzuti	8
"Tamburino del reggimento"	Gino Latilla and Doppio Quintetto Vocale	Giorgio Consolini	Deani	9
"Papà Pacifico"	Nilla Pizzi and Doppio Quintetto Vocale	Teddy Reno and Quartetto Stars	Nino Rastelli; Armando Fragna	10
"Acque amare"	Carla Boni	Katyna Ranieri	Nicola Salerno; Carlo Alberto Rossi	Eliminated
"L’altra"	Flo Sandon's	Nilla Pizzi	Vittorio Mascheroni; Biri	Eliminated
"Buona sera"	Carla Boni	Flo Sandon's	Maria Evangelisti Tumminelli; Cosimo Di Ceglie	Eliminated
"Canto della solitudine"	Nilla Pizzi	Teddy Reno	Enzo Bonagura; Gino Redi	Eliminated
"Domandatelo"	Achille Togliani	Katyna Ranieri	Vincenzo Baselice; Giuseppe Fiorelli	Eliminated
"Innamorami"	Gino Latilla	Teddy Reno	Mario Ruccione; Enzo Ceragioli; Umberto Bertini	Eliminated
"La mamma che piange di più"	Achille Togliani	Giorgio Consolini	Gigi Pisano; Furio Rendine	Eliminated
"La pianola stonata"	Achille Togliani	Katyna Ranieri	Marcello Gigante; Ettore De Mura	Eliminated
"Povero amico mio"	Gino Latilla	Giorgio Consolini	Marcella Rivi; Carlo Innocenzi	Eliminated
"Qualcuno cammina"	Carla Boni	Flo Sandon's	Nino Rastelli; Nino Casiroli	Eliminated
