= Sanremo Music Festival 1954 =

Italian song contest (4th edition)

Dates and venue
- Semi-final 1: 28 January 1954
- Semi-final 2: 29 January 1954
- Final: 30 January 1954
- Venue: Sanremo Casino; Sanremo, Italy

Organisation
- Broadcaster: Radiotelevisione italiana (RAI)
- Musical director: Cinico Angelini
- Artistic director: Giulio Razzi
- Presenters: Nunzio Filogamo

Vote
- Number of entries: 20
- Winner: "Tutte le mamme" Gino Latilla and Giorgio Consolini

The Sanremo Music Festival 1954 (Italian: Festival di Sanremo 1954), officially the 4th Italian Song Festival (4º Festival della canzone italiana), was the fourth annual Sanremo Music Festival, held at the Sanremo Casino in Sanremo between 28 and 30 January 1954, and broadcast by Radiotelevisione italiana (RAI). The show was presented by Nunzio Filogamo.

According to the rules of this edition every song was performed in a double performance by a couple of singers or groups, with some artists performing multiple songs. The winner of the festival was "Tutte le mamme", performed by Giorgio Consolini and Gino Latilla.

== Participants and results ==
Participants and results
| Song | Artist(s) | | Songwriter(s) | Rank |
|---|---|---|---|---|
| "Tutte le mamme" | Giorgio Consolini | Gino Latilla | Umberto Bertini; Eduardo Falcocchio | 1 |
| "Canzone da due soldi" | Katyna Ranieri | Achille Togliani | Pinchi; Carlo Donida | 2 |
| "...E la barca tornò da sola" | Gino Latilla | Franco Ricci | Mario Ruccione | 3 |
| "Notturno (Per chi non ha nessuno)" | Natalino Otto | Vittoria Mongardi | Francesco Saverio Mangieri | 4 |
| "Non è mai troppo tardi" | Flo Sandon's | Carla Boni | Dino Olivieri | 5 |
| "Aveva un bavero" | Quartetto Cetra | Vittoria Mongardi and Duo Fasano | Mario Panzeri; Virgilio Ripa | 6 |
| "Sotto l'ombrello" | Gino Latilla and Duo Fasano | Katyna Ranieri and Giorgio Consolini | Nino Casiroli | 7 |
| "Mogliettina" | Achille Togliani | Natalino Otto | Saverio Seracini | 8 |
| "Con te" | Achille Togliani | Flo Sandon's and Natalino Otto | Antonio "Totò" De Curtis | 9 |
| "Donnina sola" | Achille Togliani | Natalino Otto | Silvana Simoni; Aldo Valleroni; Mauro Casini | 10 |
| "Angeli senza cielo" | Vittoria Mongardi | Flo Sandon's | Pinchi; Eros Valladi | Eliminated |
| "Arriva il direttore" | Carla Boni, Gino Latilla and Duo Fasano | Quartetto Cetra | Mario Panzeri; Giuseppe Fucilli | Eliminated |
| "Berta filava" | Carla Boni and Duo Fasano | Giorgio Consolini | Pinchi; Giannetto Wilhem; Onelio Fiammenghi | Eliminated |
| "Canzoni alla sbarra" | Gino Latilla and Duo Fasano | Quartetto Cetra | Giovanni D'Anzi | Eliminated |
| "Cirillino-Ci" | Carla Boni and Duo Fasano | Quartetto Cetra | Nino Rastelli; Vittorio Mascheroni | Eliminated |
| "Gioia di vivere" | Achille Togliani | Gianni Ravera | Cesare Andrea Bixio | Eliminated |
| "Piripicchio e Piripicchia" | Duo Fasano and Gino Latilla | Quartetto Cetra | Alessandro Sopranzi; Tarcisio Fusco | Eliminated |
| "Rose (Oggi i tempi son cambiati)" | Katyna Ranieri | Vittoria Mongardi | Biri; Guido Viezzoli | Eliminated |
| "Un diario" | Carla Boni | Quartetto Cetra | Aldo Locatelli; Federico Bergamini | Eliminated |
| "Una bambina sei tu" | Gino Latilla | Natalino Otto | Giorgio Fabor | Eliminated |
