= Cerasella (song) =

- sheet music cover

Single by Gloria Christian
- Language: Neapolitan
- B-side: "Sarrà Chi Sa...!"
- Released: 1959
- Genre: Pop, Canzone Napoletana
- Length: 3:30
- Label: Durium
- Songwriter(s): Enzo Bonagura, Danpa, Eros Sciorilli

Gloria Christian singles chronology
| "Ma baciami!" (1959) | "Cerasella" (1959) | "Suttanella e Cazunciello" (1959) |

Audio
- "Cerasella" on YouTube

"Cerasella" is a 1959 Canzone Napoletana song composed by Enzo Bonagura, Danpa (Dante Pinzauti) and Eros Sciorilli. The song, with a double performance by Gloria Christian and Wilma De Angelis, was presented at the seventh edition of the Festival di Napoli and then got an immediate commercial success, peaking at sixth place on the Italian hit parade.

The song, a portrait of a naively mischievous teenager, was described as "fresh and light-hearted". It was later covered by numerous artists, including Claudio Villa, Giacomo Rondinella, Gino Latilla & Carla Boni, Aurelio Fierro, Fausto Cigliano, Shani Wallis, Renzo Arbore.

The song also inspired a comedy film with the same name, directed by Raffaello Matarazzo and starring Claudia Mori and Terence Hill.

== Track listing ==
7" single – Vi MQN. 36472

1. "Cerasella" (Enzo Bonagura, Danpa, Eros Sciorilli)
2. "Sarrà Chi Sa...!" (Gino Conte, Roberto Murolo)

== Charts ==
| Chart | Peak position |
|---|---|
| Italy | 6 |
