= Carlo Donida =

Italian composer and pianist

Carlo Donida Labati (30 October 1920 in Milan – 22 April 1998 in Porto Valtravaglia) was an Italian composer and pianist.

Carlo Donida Labati was born in Milan on 30 October 1920. He graduated in piano and composition from the Giuseppe Verdi Conservatory in Milan. Carlo Donida began his musical career as a pianist of the musical group "The Dandies". He was then hired as an arranger by Casa Ricordi, which at that time had just created a pop music section. Entered into the "songbooks", he decided to put on paper his first songs, with the assistance of Gian Carlo Testoni wherein the songs "Dimmi t'amo" ("Tell Me I Love You") and "Sotto il mandorlo" ("Under the Almond Tree") debuted on the radio and received a warm reception from the public. Then came the binomial Donida–Pinchi that gave rise to such hits as "Vecchio scarpone" ("Old Boot") and "Canzone da due soldi" ("Twopenny Song"), which had international success.

The long association with Giulio Rapetti Mogol, which eventually created 126 songs, began in 1960 with the song "Briciole di baci" ("Crumbs of Kisses") starring Mina and "Diavolo" ("Devil") sung by Jimmy Fontana.

"Uno dei tanti" ("One of the Many"), sung by Tony Dallara and Joe Paths, was brought to international success by Tom Jones & Shirley Bassey under the title "I (Who Have Nothing)". Jones also sang "Gli occhi miei" as "Help Yourself". His songs had great success abroad. Well known singers such as Tom Jones, Ben E. King, Shirley Bassey, Chet Baker, and Charles Aznavour have interpreted many of Donida's songs.

Donida participated in twelve editions of the Sanremo Festival. His debut in 1951 coincided with the first edition of the Festival with the song "Sotto il mandorlo" performed by Duo Fasano. In 1953, he participated with "Vecchio scarpone" starring Gino Latilla; a vocal quintet with Giorgio Consolini, it won third place. In 1954, he participated with "Canzone da due soldi" starring Katyna Ranieri and Achille Togliani, that ranked second. One of his largest successes came in 1961 with "Al di là" on lyrics by Mogol, performed by Betty Curtis and Luciano Tajoli, a song that rose to fame in 26 countries around the world. His career in Sanremo continued with "Abbracciami forte" ("Hug Me Tight", 1965, Udo Jurgens – Ornella Vanoni), "Gli occhi miei" ("My Eyes", 1968, Wilma Burgess – Dino), "La spada nel cuore" ("The Sword in the Heart", 1970, Patty Pravo – Little Tony) and "La folle corsa" ("The Mad Race", 1971, Little Tony – Formula 3).

During his career, Carlo Donida composed musics and scores for documentaries, commercials, and movies. Donida established itself as a composer of songs on texts in Milanese dialect as "Mi no, ghe vegni no", "Cingh ghei de pu, ma ross" and "Quand el coeur el s'innamora" that participated and won several editions of the Milanese Song Festival. Luigi Tenco played the following songs by Donida: "Serenella", "Quasi sera" ("Almost Evening"), "Sempre la stessa storia" ("Always the Same Story") and "Più mi innamoro di te" ("The More I Fall in Love with You").
