= Sanremo Music Festival 1955 =

Italian song contest (5th edition)

Dates and venue
- Semi-final 1: 27 January 1955
- Semi-final 2: 28 January 1955
- Final: 29 January 1955
- Venue: Sanremo Casino; Sanremo, Italy

Organisation
- Broadcaster: Radiotelevisione italiana (RAI)
- Artistic director: Giulio Razzi
- Presenters: Armando Pizzo, Maria Teresa Ruta

Vote
- Number of entries: 16
- Winner: "Buongiorno tristezza" Claudio Villa and Tullio Pane

The Sanremo Music Festival 1955 (Italian: Festival di Sanremo 1955), officially the 5th Italian Song Festival (5º Festival della canzone italiana), was the fifth annual Sanremo Music Festival, held at the Sanremo Casino in Sanremo between 27 and 29 January 1955, and broadcast by Radiotelevisione italiana (RAI). The show was presented by television presenter Armando Pizzo, assisted by Maria Teresa Ruta.

According to the rules of this edition every song was performed in a double performance by a couple of singers or groups, with some artists performing multiple songs. The winner of the festival was "Buongiorno tristezza", performed by Claudio Villa and Tullio Pane.

== Participants and results ==
Participants and results
Song	Artist(s)		Songwriter(s)	Rank
"Buongiorno tristezza"	Claudio Villa	Tullio Pane	Giuseppe Fiorelli; Mario Ruccione	1
"Il torrente"	Claudio Villa	Tullio Pane	Carlo Alberto Liman; Leo Carmi	2
"Canto nella valle"	Natalino Otto & Trio Aurora	Bruno Pallesi, Nuccia Bongiovanni & Radio Boys	Mario Panzeri; Umberto Fusco	3
"Incantatella"	Claudio Villa	Narciso Parigi	Enzo Bonagura	4
"Un cuore"	Antonio Basurto	Gianni Ravera	Peppino Mendes; Eduardo Falocchino	5
"L'ombra"	Jula de Palma	Marisa Colomber	Walter Colì	6
"Ci ciu cì (Cantava un usignol)"	Narciso Parigi & Radio Boys	Natalino Otto & Trio Aurora	Ettore Minoretti; Saverio Seracini	7
"Una fotografia nella cornice"	Natalino Otto	Antonio Basurto	Lucia Mannucci; Fecchi	8
"Cantilena del trainante"	Jula de Palma	Antonio Basurto	Faccenna; De Angelis	Eliminated
"Che fai tu luna in ciel"	Bruno Pallesi	Jula de Palma	Nino Rastelli; Brinniti	Eliminated
"Era un omino"	Clara Jaione & Radio Boys	Nella Colombo, Bruno Rosettani & Trio Aurora	Angelo Paolillo	Eliminated
"I tre timidi"	Natalino Otto	Nuccia Bongiovanni & Radio Boys	Eros Valladi	Eliminated
"Il primo viaggio"	Bruno Pallesi & Nuccia Bongiovanni	Bruno Rosettani, Nella Colombo & Trio Aurora	Sargon	Eliminated
"Non penserò che a te"	Gianni Ravera	Tullio Pane	Taddei; Poggiali; Minasi	Eliminated
"Sentiero"	Bruno Pallesi	Jula de Palma	Bixio Cherubini; Carlo Concina	Eliminated
"Zucchero e pepe"	Bruno Rosettani & Trio Aurora	Clara Jaione & Radio Boys	Biri; Lydia Capece Minutolo; Vittorio Mascheroni	Eliminated
