= Cerasella =

1959 film

- Directed by: Raffaello Matarazzo
- Written by: Ugo Pirro; Enzo Bonagura; Sandro Continenza; Raffaello Matarazzo; Dino Verde
- Starring: Claudia Mori; Mario Girotti; Luigi De Filippo
- Cinematography: Václav Vích
- Edited by: Mario Serandrei
- Music by: Fausto Cigliano
- Release date: 1959
- Country: Italy
- Language: Italian

Cerasella is a 1959 Italian teen comedy film directed by Raffaello Matarazzo. It is loosely inspired by the lyrics of the song "Cerasella".

== Cast ==
- Claudia Mori: Cerasella
- Mario Girotti: Bruno
- Luigi De Filippo: Alfredo
- Alessandra Panaro: Nora
- Carlo Croccolo: Giuseppe Marzano
- Piera Farfarella: Nannina
- Fausto Cigliano: The Singer
- Mario Carotenuto: Father of Bruno
- Lia Zoppelli: Mother of Nora
- Luigi Pavese: General Bruno Coscia
