= Enzo Restuccia =

Italian drummer (1941–2021)

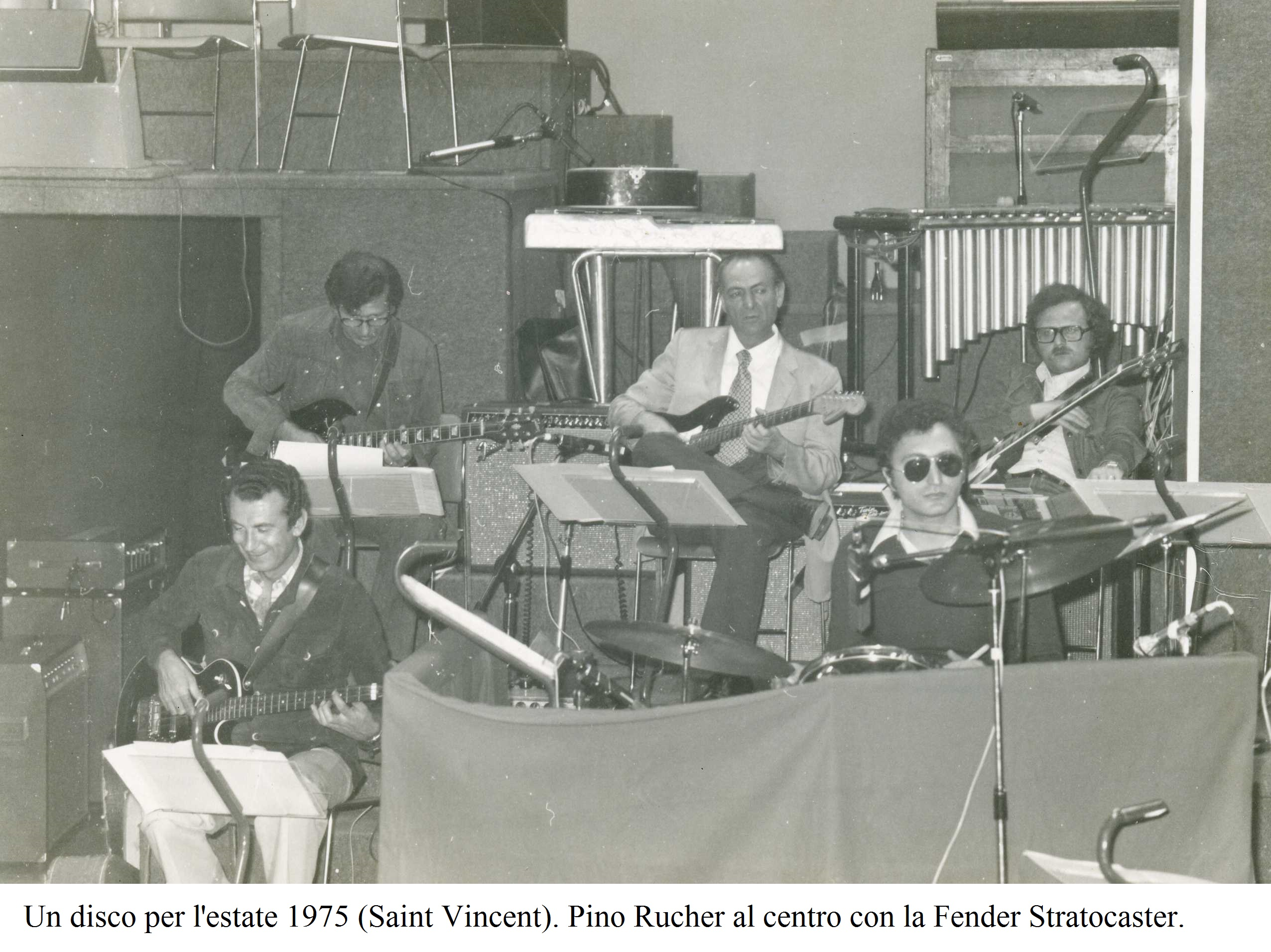
- Restuccia (bottom right) with Pino Rucher, Sergio Coppotelli, Silvano Chimenti and Maurizio Majorana, 1975
- Born: 19 March 1941; Naples, Italy
- Died: 5 December 2021 (aged 80); Rome, Italy
- Occupation: Drummer

Enzo Restuccia (19 March 1941 – 5 December 2021) was an Italian drummer.

== Biography ==
Born to a Neapolitan mother and a Sicilian father (from Avola), he began playing the drums and became a pupil of Romeo De Piscopo, the brother of the more famous Tullio. After graduating in percussion at the Conservatory of L'Aquila, he moved to Rome; Restuccia soon began working as a session man for RCA Italiana, often working with Ennio Morricone and for the creation of some 45s (e.g., for Paul Anka). He married the violist Anna Giordano, and in 1969, he became the father of Marina, who later embarked on a career as a singer with the stage name of Marina Rei .

He then became a drummer in the Rai Orchestra, taking part in television programs and participating, among other things, in eight consecutive editions of the Sanremo Festival (from 1993 to 2000); over the years, he plays on many records, such as Sergio Endrigo, Fabrizio De André, Angelo Branduardi, and Claudio Baglioni.

He often collaborates with Nicola Piovani in the albums that the musician records as an arranger at the Ortophonic studios in Rome, located in Piazza Euclide (now called Music Village studios; the sound engineer is Sergio Marcotulli, father of the jazz pianist Rita). At the same time, he also carries on a career as a jazz drummer, playing in the Marcello Rosa quintet and in the Marcello Rosa Trad Band, and playing with Dizzy Gillespie, Benny Goodman, Paco de Lucía, among others. In the 1980s, he became a drum teacher at the Perugia Conservatory and at the Saint Louis College of Music. In recent years, he has often performed with his daughter, and is busy with the tours of Ennio Morricone, of whose orchestra he is the drummer.

He died on December 5, 2021, at the age of 80.
