= Vittoria Mongardi =

Italian singer and actress

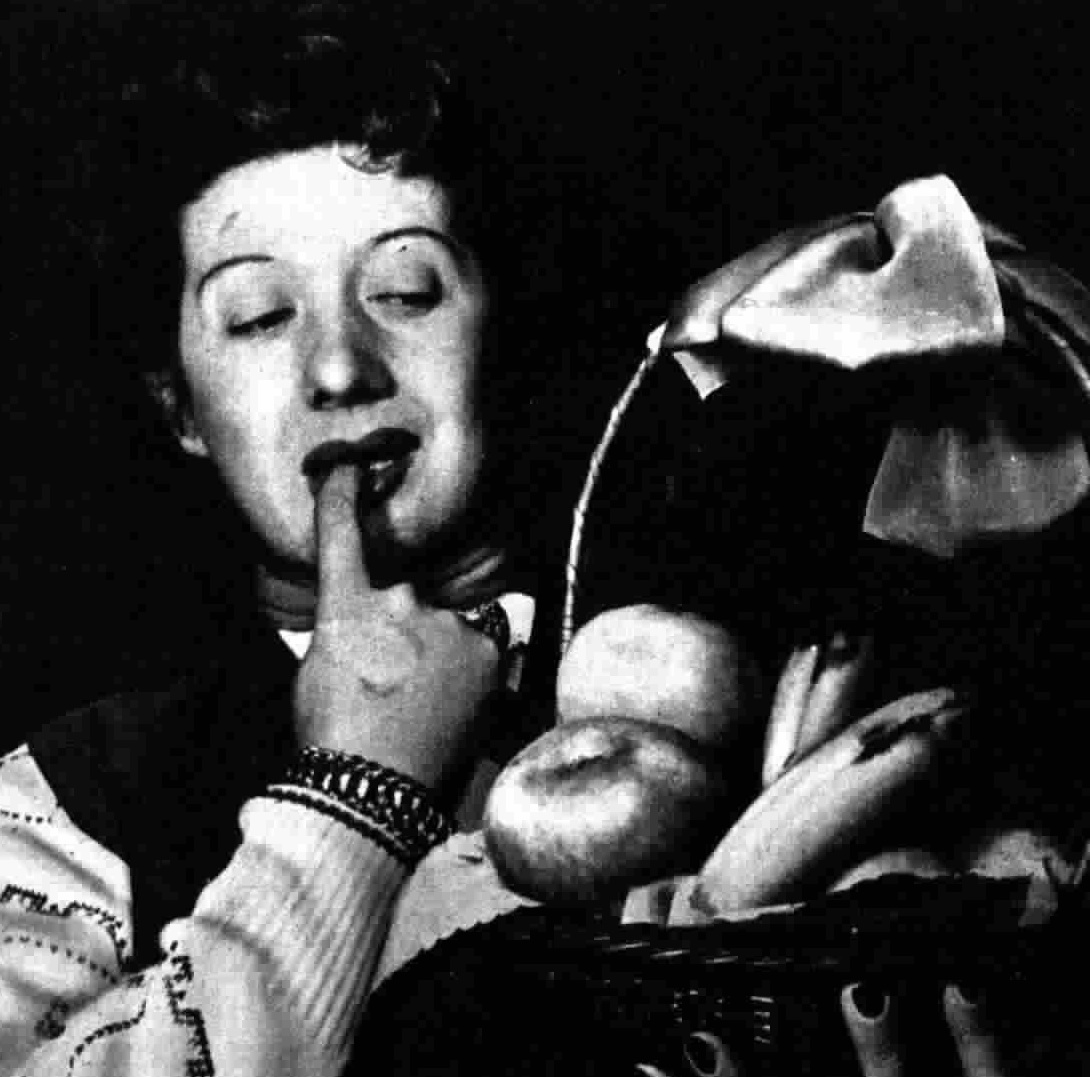
- Mongardi Radiocorriere magazine, 1954
- Born: 26 February 1926; Bologna, Italy
- Died: 26 November 1975 (aged 49); Bologna, Italy
- Occupation: Singer

Vittoria Mongardi (26 February 1926 – 26 November 1975) was an Italian singer and actress, mainly successful between the second half of the 1940s and the 1950s.

== Life and career ==
Born in Bologna, after starting out as a model and appearing in minor roles in a few films, Mongardi made her debut as a singer performing for a group of American soldiers in a military officers' club in Trieste with the orchestra led by Guido Cergoli. After an intense activity in dance halls, she worked for Radio Trieste, gaining an almost immediate popularity and launching popular songs such as "Perchè non sognar" and "Sapevi di mentire".

In the 1950s Mongardi became the vocalist in the Armando Fragna orchestra and was one of the main protagonists of the fourth edition of the Sanremo Music Festival, performing four songs, notably the successful "Aveva un bavero" she performed together with Duo Fasano. In 1961 she married a journalist and in the following years she gradually slowed her activities, until her death from an incurable disease in 1975.
