= Tutta la città canta =

1945 film

- Directed by: Riccardo Freda
- Screenplay by: Riccardo Freda; Marcello Marchesi; Vittorio Metz; Steno; Federico Fellini
- Story by: Riccardo Freda; Marcello Marchesi; Vittorio Metz; Steno; Federico Fellini
- Starring: Nino Taranto; Vivi Gioi; Natalino Otto
- Cinematography: Tony Frenguelli
- Edited by: Riccardo Freda
- Music by: Giovanni D'Anzi
- Production companies: Appia Cinematografica; ICI; SAFIR
- Distributed by: Effebi
- Release date: 15 August 1945
- Running time: 86 minutes
- Country: Italy

Tutta la città canta (transl. The Whole City Sings) is a 1945 Italian musical-comedy film directed by Riccardo Freda.

== Cast ==
- Nino Taranto as Orazio Babilia
- Vivi Gioi as Pepita
- Natalino Otto as Natalino
- I 3 Bonos (Gianni Bonos, Luigi Bonos, Vittorio Bonos) as themselves
- Nanda Primavera as first aunt
- Maria Pia Arcangeli as second aunt
- Piero Carnabuci as the theatre owner
- Umberto Silvestri as the butler
- Giuseppe Addobbati as the hotel receptionist (uncredited)

== Production ==
=== Pre-production ===
Tutta la città canta was director Riccardo Freda's third film as a director. It was influenced by Hollywood films with the idea of putting a "revue" film on which featured the period's major singers and film stars, similar to The Hollywood Revue of 1929. People in the film included Nino Taranto, a Neapolitan stage and radio comedian, Natalino Otto, a jazz singer, and singer and actress Vivi Gioi, and the three Bono brothers: Gianni, Vittorio and Luigi, who were comedians somewhat similar to the Marx Brothers.

During the script writing period, Freda met the then cartoonist Federico Fellini who was 23 years old at the time. According to Freda, Fellini was introduced to him by Vittorio Metz and took part in the screenwriting process. Freda described Fellini's contributions as being "scribbling on sheet after sheet of paper with a pen. Those were neither suggestions nor notes; Federico just kept drawing, and he drew huge naked women, real giantesses, I think paroxysmally fat women were one of his hidden obsessions. Then, probably rightly so, he disappeared."

Recording music for the film had to be done discreetly, as by 1938 in Italy, jazz was labeled as "Negroid music" and banished from the radio, and American music was forbidden by 1940. When performing songs such as "Louisiana blues", guards were placed outside the recording studio to make sure Blackshirts would not catch them.

=== Filming ===
Shooting on the film began in 1943 at Pisorno studios in Tirrenia under the title 6 x 8 / 48, based on one of the musical numbers in the film. Within a few weeks, filming was cancelled due to the escalation of World War II in Italy. Production on the film only began again in 1945. Much of the cast was unavailable at the time, and the Vivi Gioi had gained a significant amount of weight. Freda chose to simply replace actors with doubles and used quick cutting to hide any differences in actors' appearance.

== Release ==
The film's title was changed to Tutta la città canta, a title that echoes the film The Whole Town's Talking. It was distributed in Italy by Effebi and was released on 15 August 1945. The film had little success in Italy, as jazz music was no longer a hot topic as it had become legal once again. Freda spoke negatively about the film, stating that it was "a terrible turnip of a film" and that "the attempt at jazz was amusing. It was a 'spaghetti musical".

The film was restored by the Cineteca of Milan and shown as part of a retrospective on Italian comedy at the 67th Venice International Film Festival in 2010.

== Bibliography ==
- Curti, Roberto (2017). Riccardo Freda: The Life and Works of a Born Filmmaker. McFarland. ISBN 978-1476628387.
- Testa, Carlo (2002). Italian Cinema and Modern European Literatures, 1945-2000. Greenwood Publishing Group.
