= Pino Rucher =

Italian musician (1924–1996)

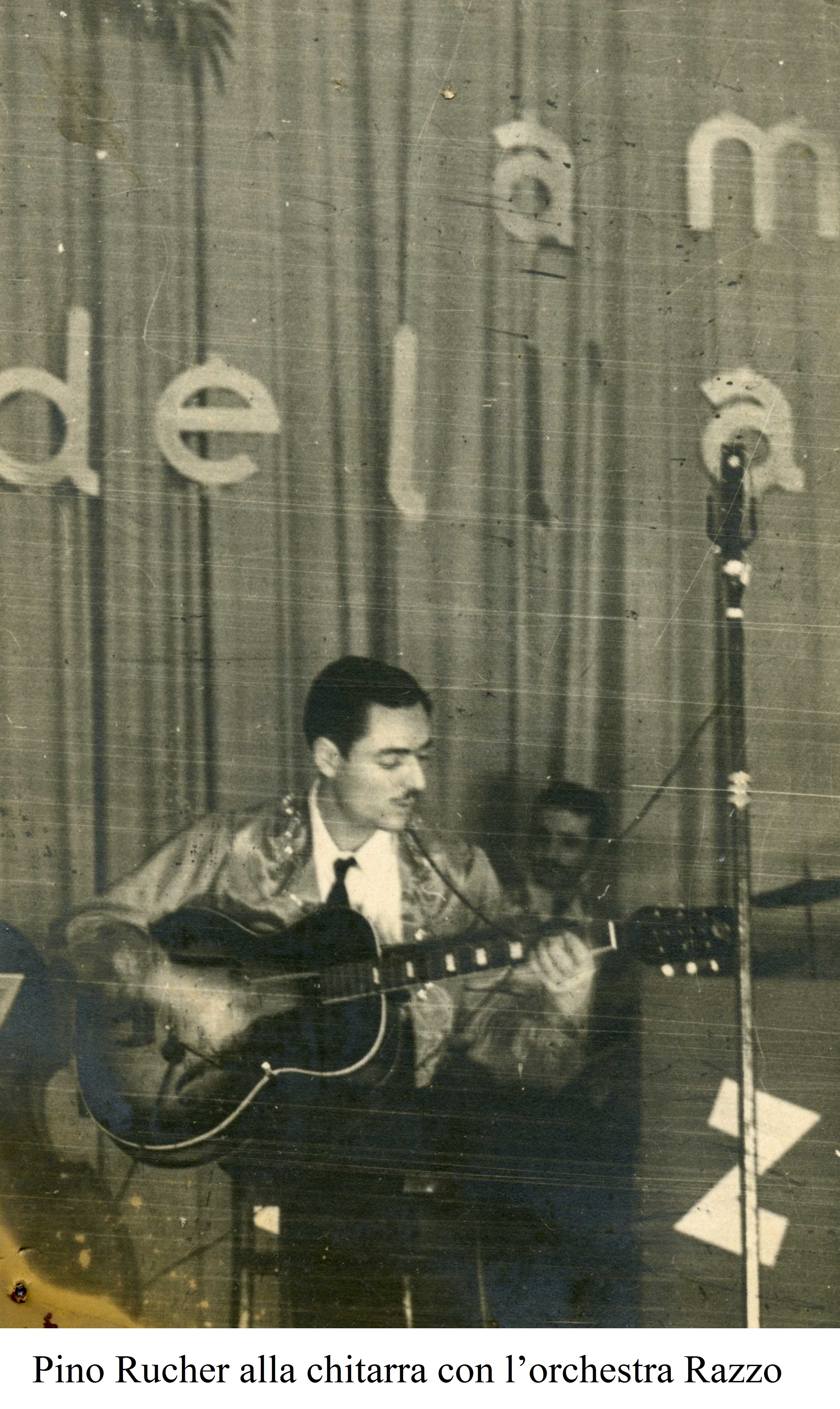
- Rucher with the Razzo band

Background information
- Born: 1 January 1924; Manfredonia, Italy
- Died: 16 August 1996 (aged 72) San Giovanni Rotondo, Italy
- Genres: Jazz
- Occupations: Guitarist, arranger
- Instrument: Guitar
- Years active: 1946-1983
- Website: www.pinorucher.it/home.html

Pino Rucher (1 January 1924 – 16 August 1996) was an Italian guitarist active in orchestral settings and in film soundtracks.

== Biographical notes and musical career ==
=== Early life ===
Rucher started playing the guitar when his father came back from the United States in 1933 and presented him with a guitar. His parents decided that he should take private music lessons. After a few years’ study, he started playing in public in his hometown and in Naples and Bari.

== American influence ==
The presence of American troops in the province of Foggia (and particularly in the area of Manfredonia, Rucher's hometown), between 1943 and 1946 led to Rucher joining several Allied Army's orchestras, where he came into contact with American musical atmosphere and jazz.

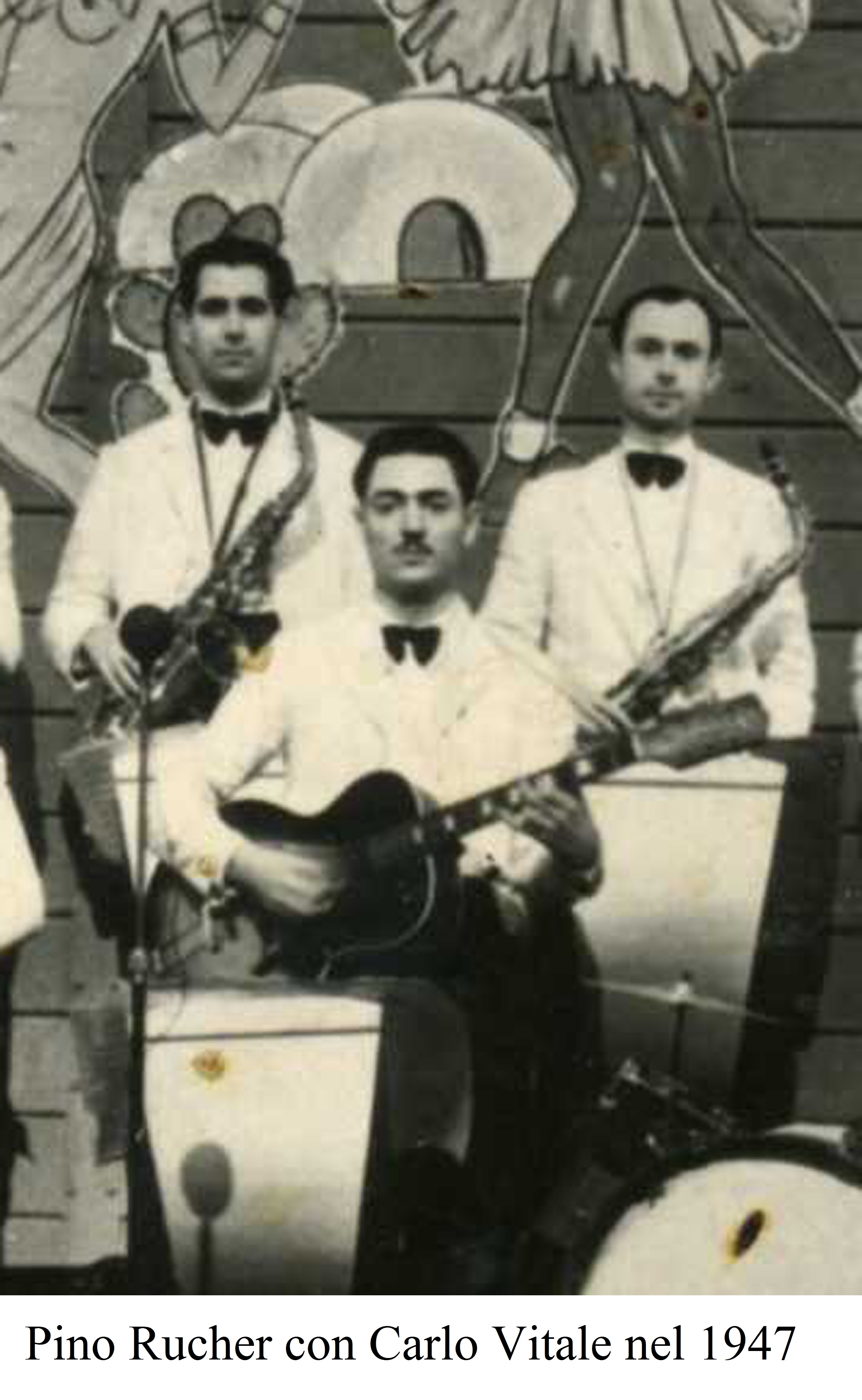
Pino Rucher with the Vitale Orchestra

In 1946, Rucher entered the Carlo Vitale orchestra after coming first in a competition for the position of guitarist at Radio Bari. After the dissolution of the Vitale orchestra, Rucher went to work for Radio Milano as a member of the Carlo Zeme orchestra. In the 1950s and the early 1960s he also worked with two forerunners of Italian "swing", Pippo Barzizza and Cinico Angelini.

=== Angelini Orchestra ===
Angelini selected Rucher as a member of his orchestra, with which Rucher worked for about ten years. He participated in events including the First International Song Festival in Venice in 1955 and several San Remo Music Festivals, among which the 1957 Festival, where Claudio Villa came first with Corde della mia chitarra.

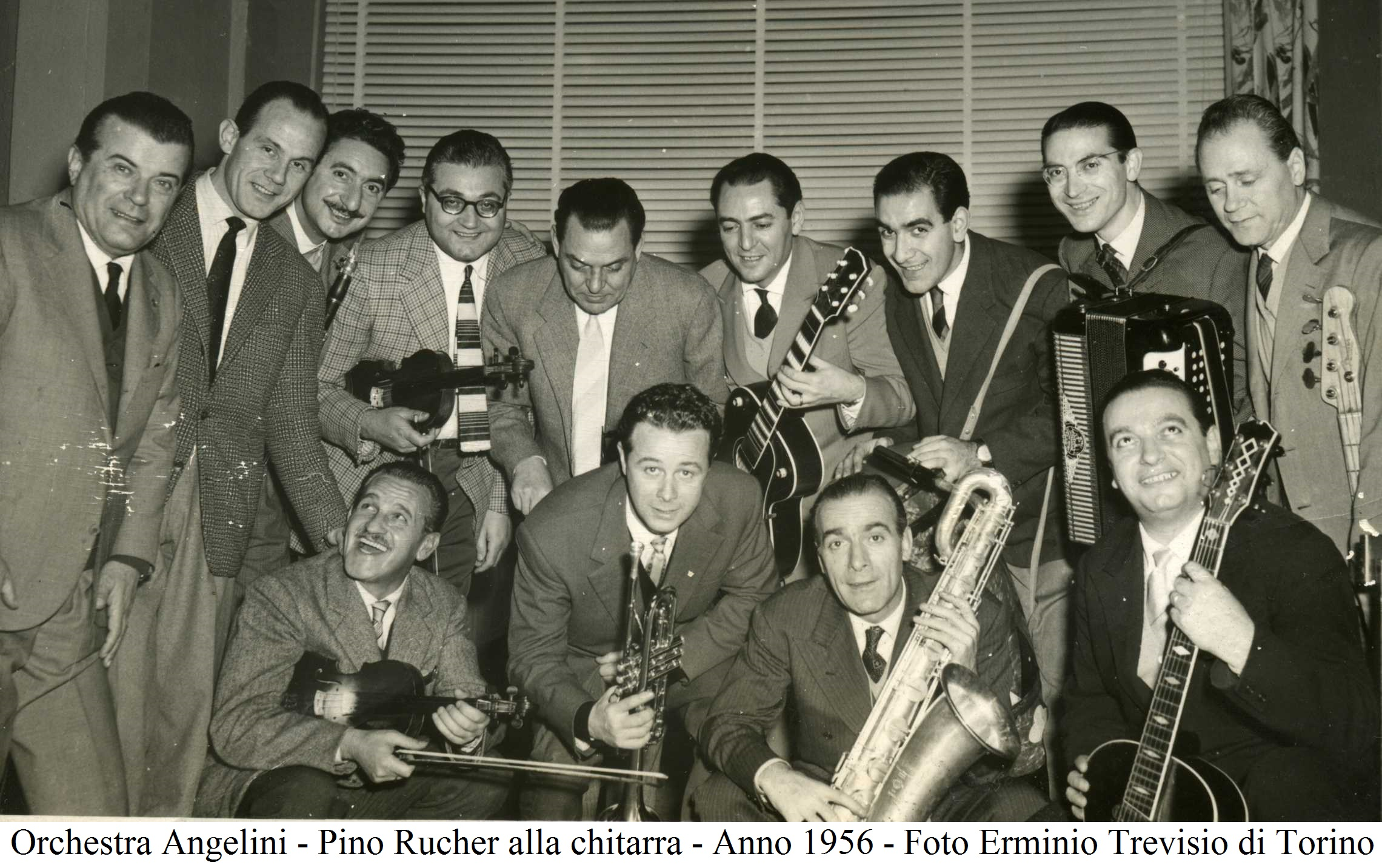
Pino Rucher at the guitar with the Angelini Orchestra (1956)

=== Pino Rucher collaborations ===
Rucher took part in many musical events and radio and television broadcasts (San Remo Music Festivals, Festival di Napoli, Festival delle rose, Mostra Internazionale di Musica Leggera in Venice, Canzonissima, Gran varietà, Studio Uno) playing in a number of orchestras and, at the same time, went on cultivating his passion for American music, as can be seen from his transcriptions, with his own arrangements. He devoted himself to jazz and performed in live concerts or in studios under the direction of many conductors. The influence of American music can be noticed from his performance of Italian songs E se domani, Una zebra a pois (sung by Mina) and Amore twist (sung by Rita Pavone). He also worked for orchestra conductor and composer Elvio Monti, who asked him to play in a number of his recordings. Rucher played the guitar in L’Estasi, a composition written by Monti for Andrea Giordana and Marina Solinas.

Rucher took part in Sorella Radio, a production with the RAI orchestra. From the second half of the 1970s to December 1983, Rucher was engaged in playing in concerts as a guitarist in the RAI orchestra Ritmi moderni, which came to be known as the RAI Big Band. In 1984, owing to health problems, he stopped working for RAI, left Rome and retired.

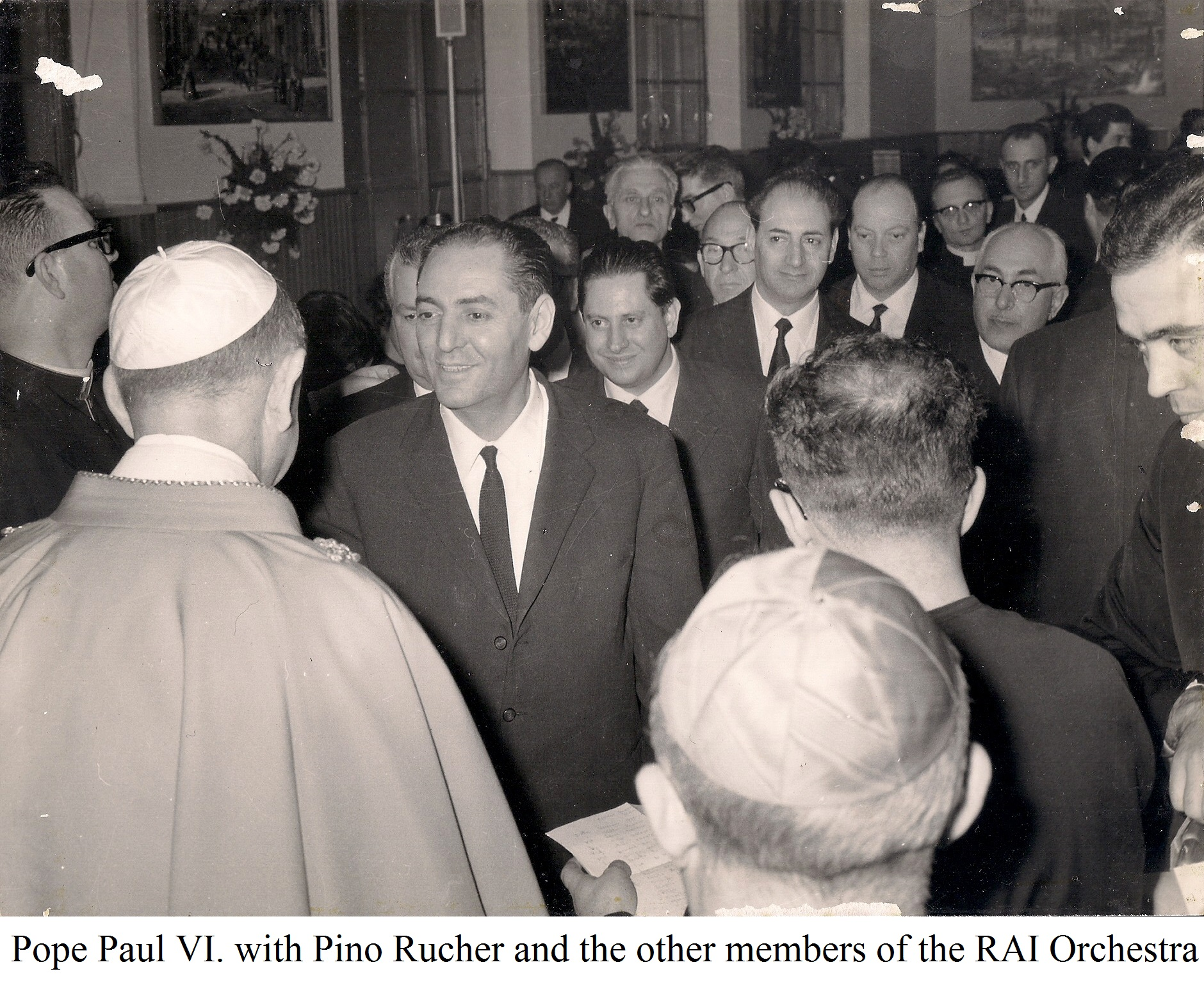
Pino Rucher is given a medal by Pope Paulus VI

== Other activities ==
Rucher performed in film soundtracks from the late 1950s to the mid-1970s, with at least two hundred performances including those under the direction of orchestra conductors Luis Bacalov, Gianni Ferrio, Elvio Monti, Ennio Morricone, and Riz Ortolani.

Rucher was the first guitarist to play the electric guitar in Italian westerns, performing as "electric guitar soloist" in A Fistful of Dollars. Rucher also appears in some shots from Sanremo - La grande sfida, a 1960 movie including scenes from the San Remo Music Festival. During his career he took part in musicals including Alleluja brava gente and his guitar ideas are present in numerous Italian songs, including Casetta in Canadà (sung by Carla Boni), Flamenco Rock (Milva), Se non ci fossi tu (Mina), Andavo a cento all'ora (Gianni Morandi), Che m'importa del mondo (Rita Pavone), L'edera (Nilla Pizzi) and Adesso no (Neil Sedaka).

Rucher played not only the electric guitar, but also the folk (or acoustic), the classical, the bass and the twelve-string guitar, and then the banjo, the mandolin and the double bass.

== Awards ==
- The Municipal Authority of Manfredonia dedicated a street to Rucher.
- On 5 October 2008, the local authorities supported a commemorative event to Rucher in his home town. The event took place in Piazza Giovanni XXIII (Manfredonia's central square).

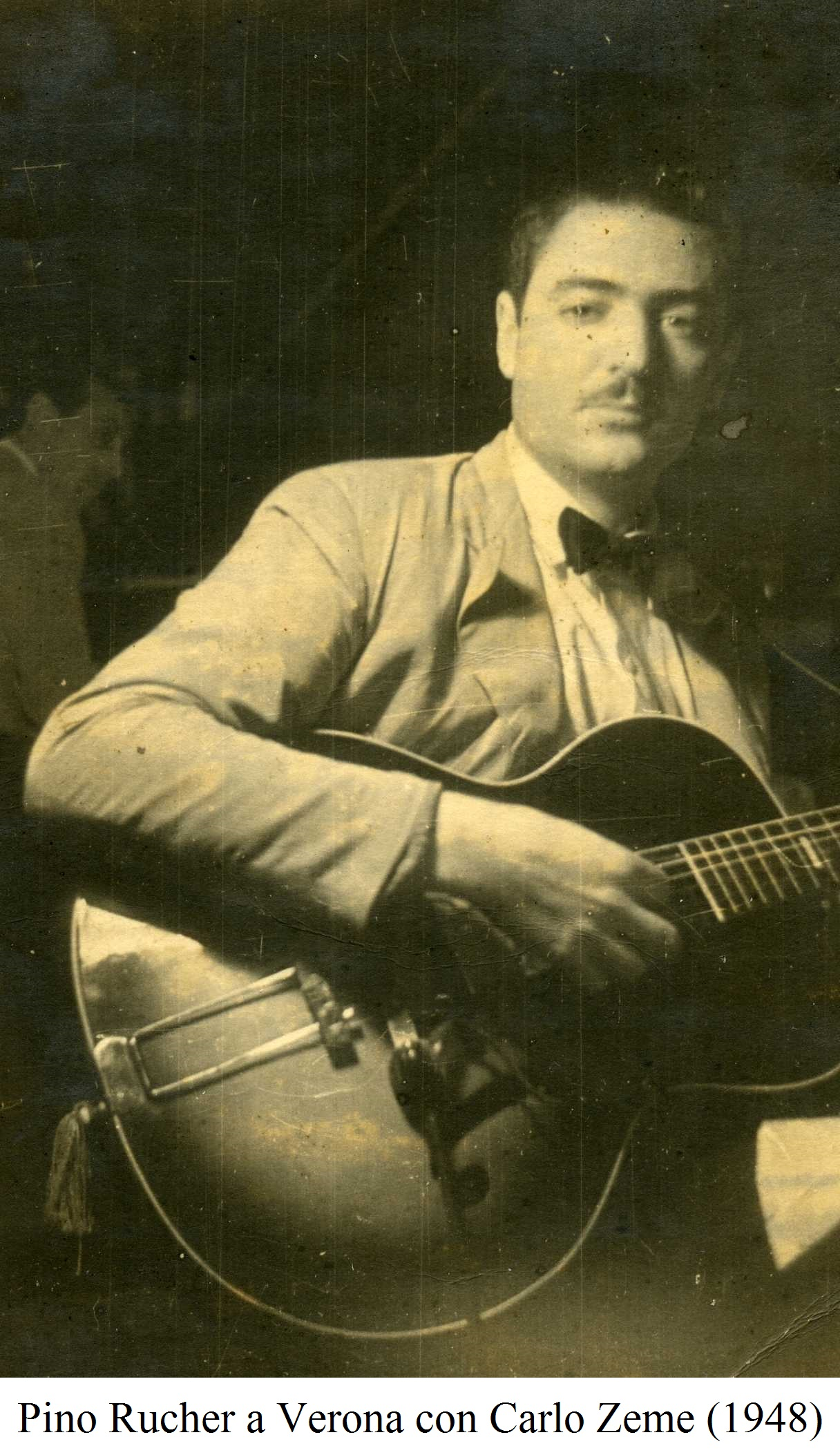
Pino Rucher at the guitar

- On 16 October 2010, the Municipal Authorities of Manfredonia and of San Nicandro Garganico dedicated a special evening to Rucher. The event took place at the Cine-Teatro Italia of San Nicandro Garganico.

== The main songs with Pino Rucher as electric guitarist ==
The main songs with Pino Rucher as electric guitarist:

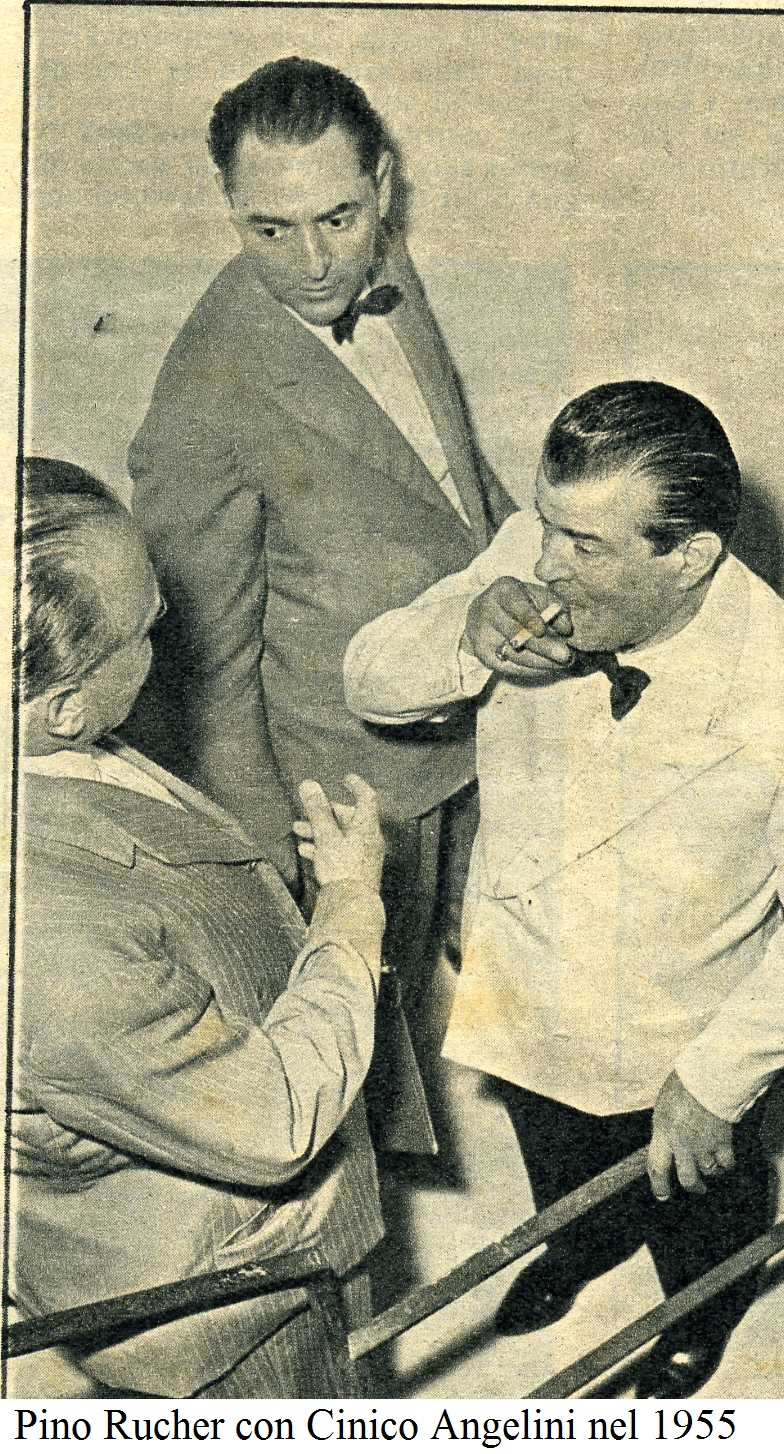
Pino Rucher with Cinico Angelini in 1955

- 1953 - No pierrot sung by Achille Togliani
- 1953 - Viale d'autunno sung by Carla Boni
- 1953 - Buonasera sung by Carla Boni
- 1953 - Duska sung by Nilla Pizzi
- 1956 - Musetto sung by Domenico Modugno
- 1956 - Io, mammeta e tu sung by Domenico Modugno
- 1956 - Guaglione sung by Claudio Villa
- 1957 - Corde della mia chitarra sung by Claudio Villa
- 1957 - Cancello tra le rose sung by Claudio Villa
- 1957 - Il pericolo numero uno sung by Claudio Villa and Gino Latilla
- 1957 - Un filo di speranza sung by Claudio Villa
- 1957 - La più bella canzone del mondo sung by Claudio Villa
- 1957 - Scusami sung by Gino Latilla
- 1957 - Casetta in Canadà sung by Carla Boni with the Duo Fasano and Gino Latilla
- 1957 - Le trote blu sung by Carla Boni and the Duo Fasano
- 1957 - Un sogno di cristallo sung by Carla Boni
- 1957 - Un certo sorriso sung by Gianni Ravera
- 1957 - Serenatella sciuè sciuè sung by Gino Latilla and Carla Boni
- 1958 - L'edera sung by Nilla Pizzi
- 1959 - Un pizzico di musica sung by Carla Boni and Gino Latilla
- 1959 - Le rififì sung by Milva Biolcati
- 1959 - Vivrò sung by Milva Biolcati
- 1959 - Nel blu dipinto di blu sung by Milva Biolcati
- 1959 - Due croci sung by Milva Biolcati
- 1960 - Senza il tuo amore sung by Milva
- 1960 - Crudele tango sung by Milva and Walter Romano
- 1960 - Flamenco rock sung by Milva
- 1960 - Da sola a sola sung by Milva
- 1960 - Una zebra a pois sung by Mina
- 1960 - Mi vuoi lasciar sung by Mina
- 1960 - Non voglio cioccolata sung by Mina
- 1960 - Tessi tessi sung by Mina
- 1961 - Mafia sung by Domenico Modugno
- 1961 - Legata ad un granello di sabbia sung by Nico Fidenco
- 1961 - Come nasce un amore sung by Nico Fidenco
- 1962 - Aspettandoti sung by Tonina Torrielli
- 1962 - La partita di pallone sung by Rita Pavone
- 1962 - Amore twist sung by Rita Pavone
- 1962 - Andavo a cento all'ora sung by Gianni Morandi
- 1962 - Loredana sung by Gianni Morandi
- 1962 - Go-kart twist sung by Gianni Morandi
- 1963 - Adesso no sung by Neil Sedaka
- 1963 - Goccia di mare sung by Nico Fidenco
- 1964 - Questi vent'anni miei sung by Catherine Spaak
- 1964 - Penso a te sung by Catherine Spaak
- 1964 - Che m'importa del mondo sung by Rita Pavone
- 1964 - Viva la pappa col pomodoro sung by Rita Pavone
- 1964 - Datemi un martello sung by Rita Pavone
- 1964 - E se domani sung by Mina
- 1965 - Rimpiangerai, rimpiangerai sung by Gino Paoli
- 1965 - Piangerò sung by Nicola Di Bari
- 1965 - Gioia mia sung by Tony Cucchiara
- 1966 - Se non ci fossi tu sung by Mina
- 1966 - Non ho dormito mai sung by Paolo Bracci
- 1967 - Che vuole questa musica stasera sung by Peppino Gagliardi
- 1970 - Pensando a cosa sei sung by Peppino Gagliardi
- 1971 - Love story sung by Peppino Gagliardi
- 1971 - Maga maghella sung by Raffaella Carrà
- 1978 - Il trenino sung by Christian De Sica (tune of the television broadcast of the same name)

== Soundtracks ==
The main soundtracks with Pino Rucher as electric guitarist:

- 1958 - Poveri milionari - Music: Armando Trovajoli
- 1959 - La grande guerra - Music: Nino Rota
- 1960 - Caravan petrol - Music: Piero Umiliani
- 1960 - La dolce vita - Music: Nino Rota
- 1960 - Via Margutta - Music: Piero Piccioni
- 1960 - Le signore - Music: Michele Cozzoli - Musical direction: Pierluigi Urbini
- 1960 - I dolci inganni - Music: Piero Piccioni
- 1961 - Kanjut Sar - La montagna che ha in vetta un lago - Music: Gino Marinuzzi jr.
- 1961 - A porte chiuse - Music: Piero Umiliani
- 1961 - Io amo, tu ami... - Music: Carlo Savina
- 1961 - Un giorno da leoni - Music: Carlo Rustichelli - Musical direction: Pierluigi Urbini - Tema partigiani
- 1961 - Il giudizio universale - Music: Alessandro Cicognini - Musical direction: Franco Ferrara
- 1962 - Boccaccio '70 - Music: Piero Umiliani (episode: Renzo e Luciana), Nino Rota (episode: Le tentazioni del dottor Antonio), Nino Rota (episode: Il lavoro)
- 1962 - Ti-Koyo e il suo pescecane - Music: Francesco De Masi - Noa-Noa - La pioggia - La laguna magica
- 1962 - La spada del Cid - Music: Carlo Savina
- 1962 - L'amore difficile - Music: Piero Umiliani
- 1963 - La donna nel mondo - Music: Nino Oliviero, Riz Ortolani - Orchestration and musical direction: Riz Ortolani
- 1963 - 8½ - Music: Nino Rota - L’illusionista
- 1963 - Ro.Go.Pa.G., episode: La ricotta - Music: Carlo Rustichelli
- 1963 - La vita provvisoria - Music: Carlo Savina
- 1963 - La parmigiana - Music: Piero Piccioni
- 1963 - Tutto il bello dell’uomo - Music: Piero Umiliani
- 1963 - Tutto è musica - Music: Domenico Modugno - Musical arrangements and Musical direction: Ennio Morricone
- 1963 - Totò sexy - Music: Armando Trovajoli
- 1963 - Il boom - Music: Piero Piccioni - The main theme
- 1963 - I 4 tassisti - Music: Fiorenzo Carpi - Musical direction: Bruno Nicolai
- 1963 - La calda vita - Music: Carlo Rustichelli - Musical direction: Pierluigi Urbini
- 1964 - Full Hearts and Empty Pockets - Music: Ennio Morricone
- 1964 - I malamondo - Music: Ennio Morricone
- 1964 - Il giornalino di Gian Burrasca - Music: Nino Rota - Musical arrangements and musical direction: Luis Enriquez Bacalov - Viva la pappa col pomodoro
- 1964 - Per un pugno di dollari - Music: Ennio Morricone - Titoli (electric guitar soloist)
- 1964 - Un mostro e mezzo - Music: Franco Mannino
- 1965 - I tre volti - Music: Piero Piccioni
- 1965 - La congiuntura - Music: Luis Enriquez Bacalov
- 1965 - Per un pugno nell'occhio - Music: Francesco De Masi - The Ciccio and Franco ballad
- 1965 - Non son degno di te - Music: Ennio Morricone
- 1965 - Una moglie americana - Music: Nino Oliviero - Musical direction: Pierluigi Urbini
- 1965 - E venne un uomo - Music: Franco Potenza
- 1965 - Una pistola per Ringo - Music: Ennio Morricone - Una pistola per Ringo (electric guitar soloist) - Angel face (electric guitar soloist)
- 1965 - Altissima pressione - Music: Ennio Morricone, Luis Enriquez Bacalov
- 1965 - Agente S03 operazione Atlantide - Music: Teo Usuelli - Relaxing swing - Relaxing shake - S03 blues (alternative version)
- 1965 - Gli amanti latini - Music: Carlo Savina - The shower scene at the beginning of the movie
- 1965 - Giulietta degli spiriti - Music: Nino Rota
- 1965 - Il compagno Don Camillo - Music: Alessandro Cicognini - Giovane amore
- 1965 - 100.000 dollari per Ringo - Music: Bruno Nicolai
- 1965 - Thrilling (Third episode: L’autostrada del sole) - Music: Ennio Morricone - Scene: Sylva Koscina at the table with Alberto Sordi
- 1965 - Idoli controluce - Music: Ennio Morricone
- 1965 - Per qualche dollaro in più - Music: Ennio Morricone - Per qualche dollaro in più (electric guitar soloist) - Il vizio d’uccidere (electric guitar soloist)
- 1965 - Due marines e un generale - Music: Piero Umiliani
- 1965 - Made in Italy - Music: Carlo Rustichelli
- 1965 - Adiós gringo - Music: Benedetto Ghiglia - Adios (the guitars and harmonicas version)
- 1966 - Avventure di mare e di costa - Music: Franco Potenza
- 1966 - Mi vedrai tornare - Music: Ennio Morricone
- 1966 - Sette dollari sul rosso - Music: Francesco De Masi
- 1966 - Io, io, io... e gli altri - Music: Carlo Rustichelli - Cocktail - Attesa al bar
- 1966 - The Texican - Music: Nico Fidenco - Musical direction: Robby Poitevin
- 1966 - Fumo di Londra - Music: Piero Piccioni - Musical direction: Bruno Nicolai - Drag beat - Drag beat (alternate)
- 1966 - Django - Music: Luis Enriquez Bacalov
- 1966 - L’affare Beckett - Music: Nora Orlandi
- 1966 - Una rosa per tutti - Music: Luis Enriquez Bacalov
- 1966 - Arizona Colt - Music: Francesco De Masi - The Arizona theme
- 1966 - La battaglia dei Mods - Music: Robby Poitevin
- 1966 - E’ mezzanotte, butta giù il cadavere - Music: Gino Peguri
- 1966 - Texas addio - Music: Antón García Abril
- 1966 - Sugar Colt - Music: Luis Enriquez Bacalov
- 1966 - 1000 dollari sul nero - Music: Michele Lacerenza - Musical direction: Luigi Zito - Inseguimento - Attimi d’amore
- 1966 - Navajo Joe - Music: Ennio Morricone
- 1966 - Il buono, il brutto, il cattivo - Music: Ennio Morricone - Titoli (electric guitar soloist)
- 1966 - 3 pistole contro Cesare - Music: Marcello Giombini
- 1966 - Ringo, il volto della vendetta - Music: Francesco De Masi
- 1967 - Se sei vivo spara - Music: Ivan Vandor
- 1967 - ...E divenne il più spietato bandito del sud - Music: Gianni Ferrio - Billy
- 1967 - 7 Winchester per un massacro - Music: Francesco De Masi
- 1967 - I giorni dell'ira - Music: Riz Ortolani
- 1967 - Le due facce del dollaro - Giosy Capuano, Mario Capuano
- 1968 - Straniero... fatti il segno della croce! - Music: Marcello Gigante - Musical direction: Carlo Esposito
- 1968 - Eva la venere selvaggia - Music: Roberto Pregadio - Jungle shake - Eva’s beguine
- 1968 - E intorno a lui fu morte - Music: Carlo Savina
- 1968 - Top Sensation - Music: Sante Romitelli - Musical direction: Luigi Zito
- 1969 - Metti, una sera a cena - Music: Ennio Morricone
- 1969 - Femina ridens - Music: Stelvio Cipriani - Love symbol
- 1969 - Kommissar X – Drei goldene Schlangen - Music: Roberto Pregadio
- 1969 - Kidnapping! Paga o uccidiamo tuo figlio - Music: Michele Lacerenza
- 1969 - L’isola delle svedesi - Music: Roberto Pregadio
- 1969 - Una su 13 - Music: Stelvio Cipriani, Carlo Rustichelli
- 1970 - The Underground (Il clandestino) - Music: Roberto Pregadio
- 1970 - Franco e Ciccio sul sentiero di guerra - Music: Roberto Pregadio - Marcia indiana - Prega Dio
- 1970 - Deserto di fuoco - Music: Franco Bixio, Roberto Pregadio
- 1971 - Testa t'ammazzo, croce... sei morto... Mi chiamano Alleluja - Music: Stelvio Cipriani - La verde prateria
- 1971 - I diabolici convegni - Music: Carlo Savina
- 1971 - Questo sporco mondo meraviglioso - Music: Piero Umiliani
- 1971 - Lo chiamavano King - Music: Luis Enriquez Bacalov
- 1971 - Mazzabubù... Quante corna stanno quaggiù? - Music: Roberto Pregadio
- 1972 - La gatta in calore - Music: Gianfranco Plenizio - Grigioperla
- 1972 - Alleluja e Sartana figli di... Dio - Music: Elvio Monti, Franco Zauli
- 1972 - Come fu che Masuccio Salernitano, fuggendo con le brache in mano, riuscì a conservarlo sano - Music: Roberto Pregadio
- 1973 - Servo suo - Music: Carlo Esposito

== Bibliographical notes ==
- d.a., Manfredonia: "La nemica" di Niccodemi al Teatro Pesante, in La Capitanata (Foggia), II (1945), n° 27 (28 October), p. 4
- Musica jazz stasera all'Unione, in La Gazzetta del Mezzogiorno (Bari), 17 November 1951, p. 4
- l.m., Jazz e blues alla Sala Unione, in La Gazzetta del Mezzogiorno (Bari), 18 November 1951, p. 4
- Artisti pugliesi: Il chitarrista Pino Ruker, in Roma (Napoli), 27 March 1958, p. 4 (Cronache delle Puglie)
- Mario Bellucci, Giuseppe Rucher, in Lira musicale di Manfredonia: Musicisti del passato e del presente, Frascati, Tip. Laziale, [1966], p. 67
- Carlo Carfagna, Mario Gangi, Rucher Giuseppe (Pino), in Dizionario chitarristico italiano, Ancona, Edizioni musicali Bèrben, 1968, p. 63
- Al Teatro Giordano: Domani prosa stasera jazz, in La Gazzetta del Mezzogiorno (Bari), 9 November 1969, p. 19
- Vittorio Franchini, Jazz della Rai (prima volta) esce dal Palazzo con tante «star», in Corriere della Sera, 28 January 1980, p. 9
- Alla radio questa settimana, in Radiocorriere TV (Roma), LVII (1980), n° 13 (March), p. 61
- Michele Ferri, Profilo di un musicista: Il chitarrista Pino Rucher, in il Sipontiere (Manfredonia), III (1986), n° 2 (April–June), p. 3
- Michele Apollonio, Manfredonia: Le intitolazioni a 14 concittadini simbolo: Vie e nuovi nomi nel quartiere «Algesiro-Gozzini», in La Gazzetta del Mezzogiorno (Bari), 15 December 2005, p. 11
- Maurizio Becker, C'era una volta la RCA, Roma, Coniglio Editore, 2007, [Pino Rucher mentioned among RCA guitarists on p. 299]
- Carlo Ferrini, L'orchestra Angelini trasmise per radio musiche composte a Faenza, in Faenza... la città, Faenza, Tip. Faentina, 2008, p. 103
- Francesco Pesante, Pino Rucher, con la sua chitarra wawa dalla trilogia del dollaro alla Carrà..., in l'Attacco (Foggia), 3 October 2008, p. 19
- Michele Ferri, Omaggio a Pino Rucher grande chitarrista scomparso, in il Provinciale (Foggia), XX (2008), n° 10 (October), p. 3
- Maurizio De Tullio, Pino Rucher, in Dizionario Biografico di Capitanata: 1900-2008, Foggia, Edizioni Agorà, 2009, pp. 252–3
- Fernando Fratarcangeli, Pino Rucher, in Raro!. Mensile di collezionismo, cultura musicale e cinema (Roma), XXI (2010), n° 217 (January), pp. 42–45
- a.m.v., Il ricordo del chitarrista Pino Rucher, in La Gazzetta di Capitanata - La Gazzetta del Mezzogiorno, 8 January 2010, p. 10
- Adriano Mazzoletti, Il jazz in Italia: dallo swing agli anni sessanta, vol. II, Torino, EDT, 2010, [Pino Rucher mentioned on pp. 321, 348, 458]
- Anna Lucia Sticozzi, La musica rende omaggio alla chitarra dei «western», in La Gazzetta di Capitanata - La Gazzetta del Mezzogiorno, 11 October 2010, p. 1
- Anna Lucia Sticozzi, L'omaggio alla chitarra dei «western», in La Gazzetta di Capitanata - La Gazzetta del Mezzogiorno, 11 October 2010, p. 11
- Dario Salvatori, Ciao Pregadio, maestro di musica e di vita, in Il Tempo (Roma) - Edizione Abruzzo e Molise, 16 November 2010, p. 54
- Lucia Piemontese, Manfredonia ingrata dimentica Pino Rucher, il chitarrista di Sergio Leone, in l'Attacco (Foggia), 27 September 2011, p. 16
- Mario Patry, Le Bon, la Brute et le Truand - Coups de feu dans la Sierra Leone (2^{e} partie), in Séquences. La revue de cinéma (Haute-Ville, Québec, Canada), LIX (2014), n° 291 (January–August), pp. 26–27 [Pino Rucher mentioned on p. 27]
- Federico Savina, Cicognini, Rota, Lavagnino, Savina, Trovajoli: tecniche di post-produzione a confronto, in Musica/Tecnologia (Firenze), n° 8-9 (2014-2015), pp. 39–55 [Pino Rucher mentioned on p. 46]
- Germano Barban, Voci dal lontano West italiano, in Raropiù. Mensile di cultura musicale, collezionismo e cinema (Roma), III (2015), n° 29 (November), p. 51 [Pino Rucher mentioned on p. 51]
- Ulrich Adelt, Thrown into a Cruel World: Neil Young's Dead Man (1995), in All by Myself: Essays on the Single-Artist Rock Album, edited by Steve Hamelman, Lanham, Maryland, Rowman & Littlefield, 2016, [Pino Rucher mentioned on p. 144]
- FORUM: IL VILLAGGIO SOTTO LA BASILICA, in VINILE (Cernusco sul Naviglio), n° 7 (April–May 2017), [Pino Rucher mentioned on p. 83]
- Mariantonietta Di Sabato, Pino Rucher, il musicista manfredoniano che suonò con Luis Bacalov, in ManfredoniaNews.it (Manfredonia), VIII (2017), n° 23 (December), p. 3
- Giovanni Gatta, Ennio Morricone e quel legame con il manfredoniano Pino Rucher, in ManfredoniaNews.it (Manfredonia), XI (2020), n° 14 (July), p. 3
- Julian Marszalek, THE SABRES OF PARADISE: HAUNTED DANCEHALL (WARP,1994), in Prog (London), n° 113 (October 2020), p. 20
- Giovanni Gatta, Pino Rucher nel ricordo del grande Gigi Proietti, in ManfredoniaNews.it (Manfredonia), XI (2020), n° 21 (November), p. 3
- IL RICORDO: Quando Lina Wertmüller parlò del musicista manfredoniano Pino Rucher: “Era un ottimo chitarrista”, in l'Attacco (Foggia), 14 December 2021, p. 24
