= Giorgio Consolini =

Italian singer (1968–2012)

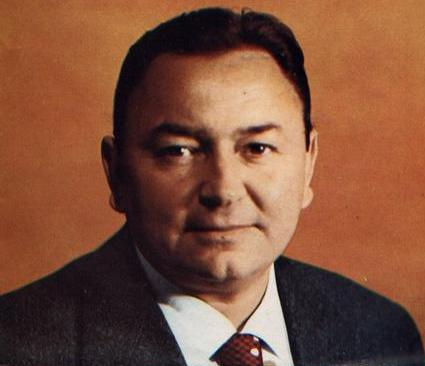
- Consolini in 1962

Background information
- Born: 28 August 1920; Bologna, Italy
- Died: 28 April 2012 (aged 91) Bologna, Italy
- Genres: Popular music; folk
- Occupation: Singer
- Years active: 1945–2011
- Labels: CGD; Parlophon; Meazzi; Edig; Mia Records

Giorgio Consolini (28 August 1920 – 28 April 2012) was an Italian singer.

== Biography ==
Consolini was born on 28 August 1920, in Bologna. In 1954, he won the Sanremo Music Festival in partnership with Gino Latilla, with the song "Tutte le mamme".

On 5 October 2008, Consolini participated in Omaggio a Pino Rucher, una vita per la chitarra ("Homage to Pino Rucher, a life for the guitar"). The event, in honor of Pino Rucher (RAI guitarist) twelve years after his death, was sponsored by the municipal authorities of Manfredonia and by the authorities of the Province of Foggia.

Preceded by Carla Boni / Flo Sandon's	Winner of the Sanremo Music Festival; Giorgio Consolini / Gino Latilla; 1954	Succeeded by Claudio Villa / Tullio Pane
