= Katyna Ranieri =

Italian singer (1925–2018)

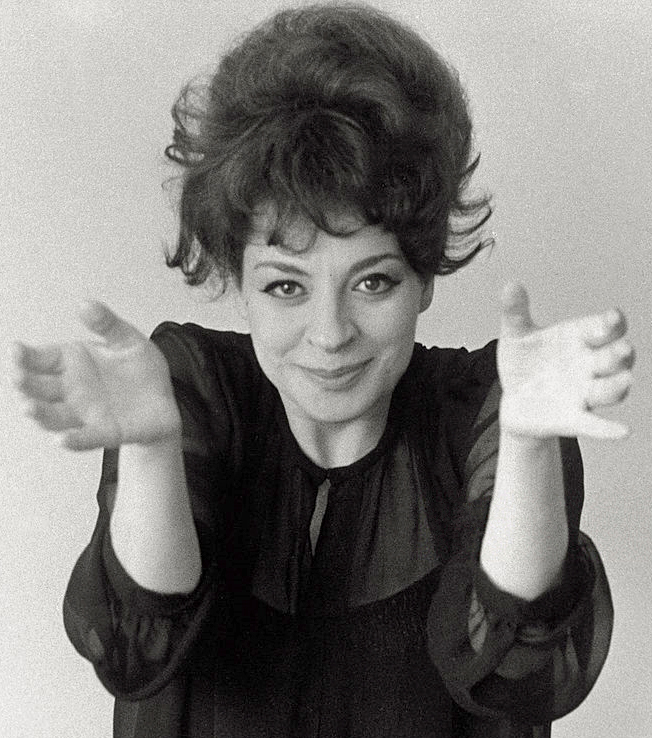
- Katyna Ranieri in 1962
- Born: Caterina Ranieri; 31 August 1925; Follonica, Tuscany, Kingdom of Italy
- Died: 3 September 2018 (aged 93); Rome, Lazio, Italy
- Occupation: Singer
- Years active: 1945–2018
- Website: katynaranieri.it

Caterina Ranieri (31 August 1925 – 3 September 2018), known professionally as Katyna Ranieri, was an Italian singer.

== Biography ==
Ranieri was born in Follonica in 1925. She had her first hit in 1954 at the Sanremo Music Festival with the song "Una canzone da due soldi".

Ranieri enjoyed great success singing "Ti guarderò nel cuore", the Italian vocal version of the theme song of the 1962 film Mondo Cane and the subsequent English vocal version known as "More". She performed this song at the 36th Academy Awards in 1964, becoming the first Italian singer to perform at the Academy Awards.

As an actress, she worked with Nino Rota and Federico Fellini. She sang the title song "Strange World" for the 1968 film Bandits in Milan. Her song "Oh My Love" (originally featured on the soundtrack of the film Goodbye Uncle Tom) was featured on the soundtrack of the 2011 film Drive.

=== Personal life ===
In 1956, Ranieri married Italian film composer Riz Ortolani (composer of "More"). She died in Rome on 3 September 2018.

== Selected filmography ==
- Captain Phantom (1953)
- Tears of Love (1954)
