= Gloria Christian =

Italian singer

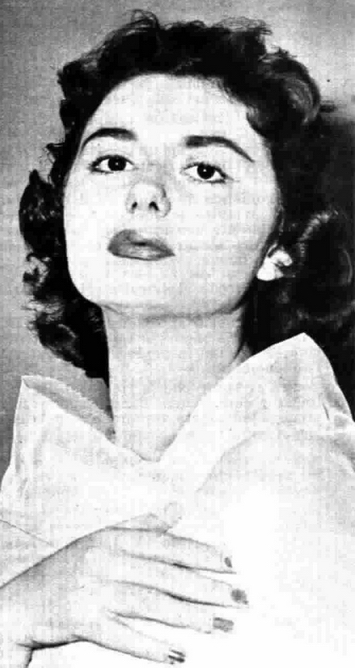
- Christian Radiocorriere magazine, 1958
- Born: June 24, 1934 (age 92); Bologna, Italy
- Occupation: Singer

Gloria Christian (born 24 June 1934) is an Italian canzone napoletana singer, mainly successful between the second half of the 1950s and the 1960s.

== Life and career ==
Born in Bologna, she is the daughter of a Neapolitan trumpeter and of a Venetian mother. At early age, Christian moved with her family to Naples where she graduated from the Istituto Magistrale Pimentel Forseca. As a student, she was part of a jazz band and the dance orchestra led by Renato Marini. In 1956, she participated in the radio musical contest, "La bacchetta d'oro", which earned her early popularity and a contract with the label Vis. In 1957, she released her first hit, a cover version of "Que Sera, Sera" which ranked #3 on the Italian hit parade.

Between 1957 and 1962, Christian participated in the main competition of the Sanremo Music Festival four times, obtaining two significant successes with the songs "Casetta in Canadà" (1957) and "Timida serenata" (1958). She also entered the competition at the Festival di Napoli ten times, getting a large success with her 1959 entry "Cerasella" and winning the competition in 1962 with the song "Marechiaro Marechiaro". In 1970, she was the presenter of the last edition of the festival.

During her career, Christian was also active as an actress in musical comedies, notably appearing in Rugantino.
