= Tullio Pane =

Italian singer (1930–2001)

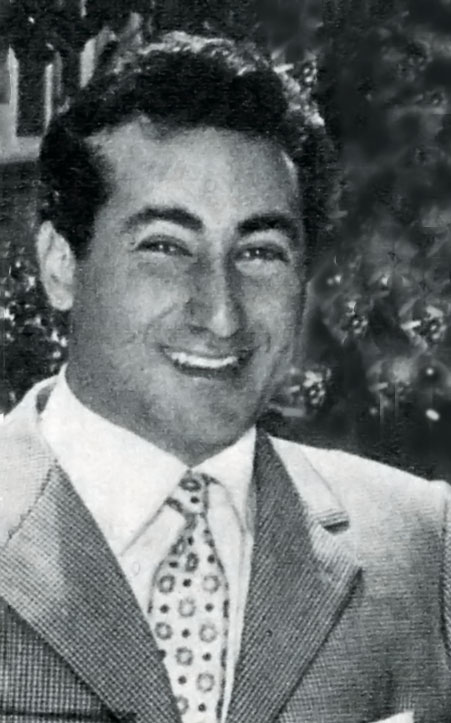
- Pane in 1956

Background information
- Also known as: Nicknamed Panino for his short stature
- Born: June 16, 1930; Naples, Italy
- Died: October 3, 2001 (aged 71) Civitavecchia, Italy
- Genres: Canzone napoletana
- Occupation: Singer
- Years active: 1950–2001

Pasquale Pane, known as Tulio (16 June 1930 – 3 October 2001) was an Italian singer. In 1955, he won the Sanremo Music Festival in partnership with Claudio Villa, with the song "Buongiorno tristezza".

| Preceded by Giorgio Consolini / Gino Latilla | Winner of the Sanremo Music Festival; Claudio Villa / Tullio Pane; 1955 | Succeeded by Franca Raimondi |
