= Natalino Otto =

Italian singer (1912–1969)

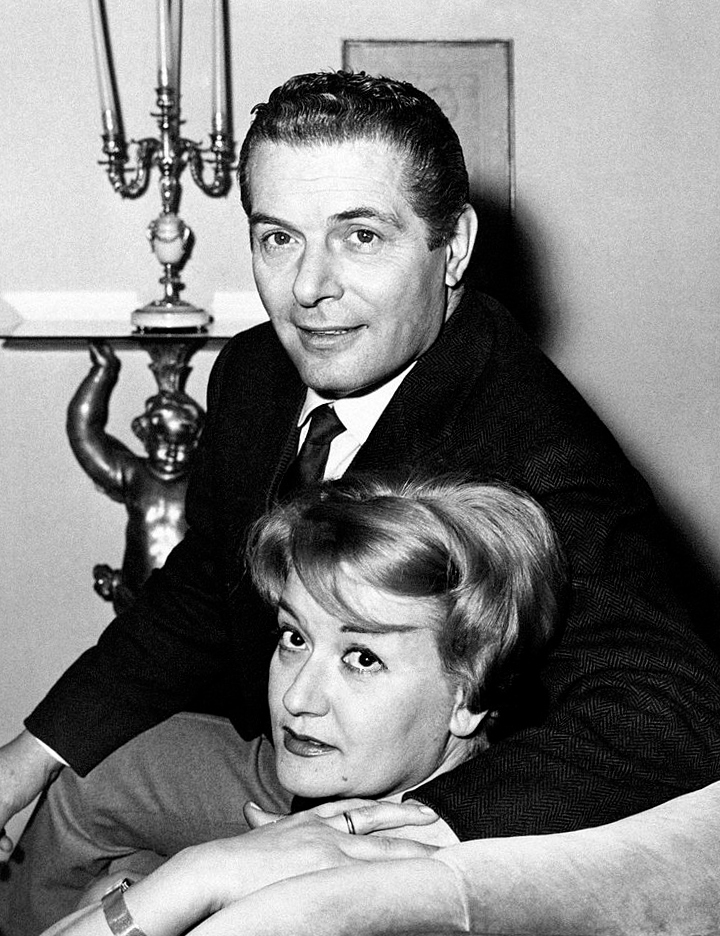
- Natalino Otto with wife Flo Sandon's in 1959
- Born: Natale Codognotto; 24 December 1912; Cogoleto, Kingdom of Italy
- Died: 4 October 1969 (aged 56); Milan, Italy
- Occupation: Singer
- Spouse: Flo Sandon's (m. 1955)

Natale Codognotto (24 December 1912 – 4 October 1969), known professionally as Natalino Otto, was an Italian singer. He started the swing genre in Italy.

== Biography ==
=== Early years ===
Natalino Otto was born at Cogoleto, province of Genoa, in northern Italy.

His career as a singer and musician started in the clubs of his native region, Liguria. During the 1930s he worked as an entertainer on board transatlantic liners on the routes between Europe and North America, which gave him the opportunity to get to know American music genres, especially jazz and swing.

In 1935, he was hired by an Italian-American radio station in New York. Back in Italy in 1937, Otto presented an innovative repertoire, strongly influenced by American music of that era. But he had to face Italian Fascist regime censorship, that banned anything foreign. He was forced to translate song titles and lyrics into Italian. The Italian state radio company EIAR did not broadcast his songs, and labelled them as "barbaric negro antimusic".

Banned from the radio, Natalino Otto worked for recording companies instead, together with two great Italian bandleaders, Gorni Kramer and Pippo Barzizza. In a short while he won the audience with his records – one of the few Italian singers of those times, if not the only one, to achieve success without his songs playing on the radio. Italian people danced to his swing tunes, which earned him the nickname "King of Rhythm".

=== Cinema and Sanremo Festival ===
Thanks to his popularity, also the movie industry wanted him. He was offered singer roles in a few films. He was the leading character in The Whole City Sings directed by Riccardo Freda in 1945. He also starred in La casa senza tempo and Carosello del varietà.

During the 1950s, Natalino Otto took part for five times in the Sanremo Music Festival. His best result was a third place in 1955 with a song titled "Canto nella valle". In that year he married Flo Sandon's, also an Italian singer. They had a daughter Silvia born in 1956.

In the early 1960s, Otto retired from the public scene, but he continued to be involved in show organization, recordings and musical research.

He died in Milan in 1969.

== Overview ==
Natalino Otto was a very prolific singer. He recorded over two thousand songs during his career. His greatest hits were "Ho un sassolino nella scarpa", "Mamma voglio anch'io la fidanzata", "Mister Paganini", "Polvere di stelle", "Op op trotta cavallino", "Natalino studia canto", "Il valzer del boogie-woogie", "La classe degli asini".

Natalino Otto and his wife Flo Sandon's (married at 2 June 1955) are credited with the discovery of one of Italy's greatest singers of all times – Mina. On the night of 24 September 1958 the Happy Boys, a band of teen-age students was playing in the Rivaloro del Re dance hall, Cremona. Otto and his wife were present, and were greatly impressed by the singer of that group. They went to meet her at the end of the concert and proposed her a trial recording session. One month later, Mina's first single was out.

== Selected filmography ==
- The Whole City Sings (1945)
