= Fausto Cigliano =

Italian actor and musician (1937–2022)

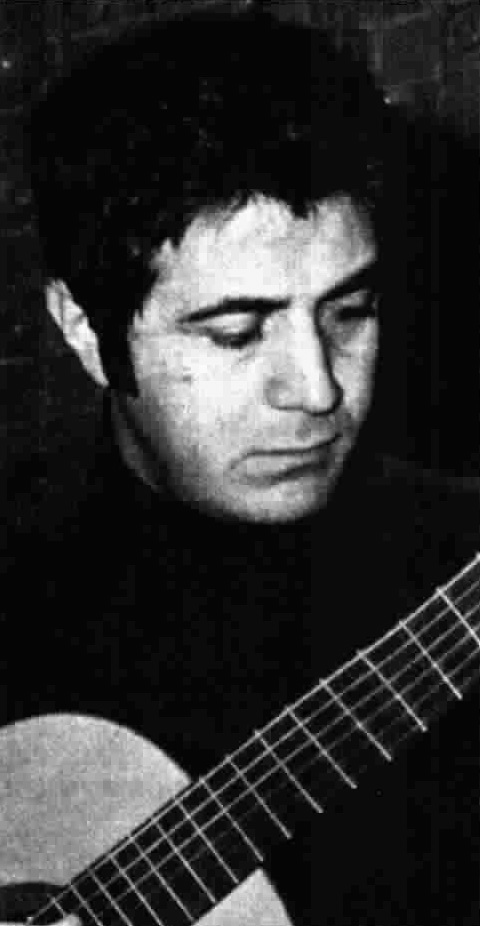
- Cigliano in 1975
- Born: 15 February 1937; Naples, Kingdom of Italy
- Died: 17 February 2022 (aged 85); Rome, Italy
- Occupations: Singer, musician, actor
- Years active: 1955–2022

Fausto Cigliano (15 February 1937 – 17 February 2022) was an Italian singer, guitarist, and actor.

== Life and career ==
Born in Naples into a humble family, Cigliano approached the music at young age, after having received a guitar as a gift, and he made his record debut in 1953. Cigliano became first known thanks to his participation to the Napoli Music Festival, that he later won in 1959, in couple with Teddy Reno with the song "Sarrà... chi sà". In 1957 he ranked first at the Italian hit parade with the single "Che m'ha 'mparato a fa'". Between 1959 and 1964 he was entered into the main competition at the Sanremo Music Festival five times. In the second half of the 1950s he also appeared in several comedy films. In 1976, Cigliano graduated in guitar at the Santa Cecilia Conservatory in Rome. He later focused his activities on the research and the revision of traditional Neapolitan music.

Cigliano died on 17 February 2022, two days after his 85th birthday.
