= Flo Sandon's =

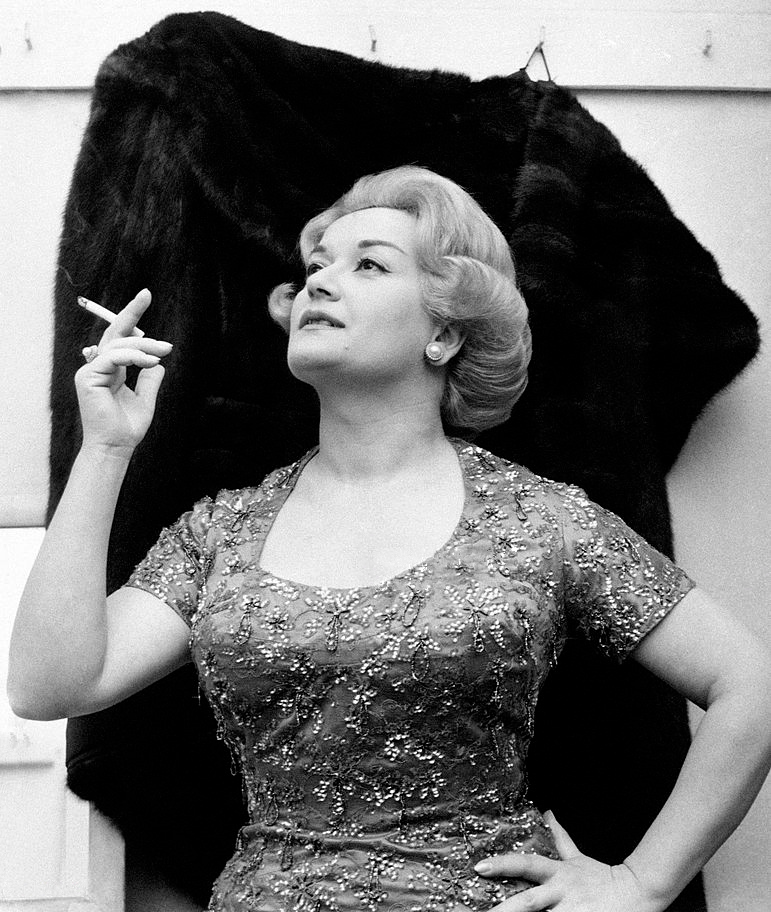
- Sandon's in 1960

Background information
- Born: Mammola Sandon; 29 June 1924; Vicenza, Kingdom of Italy
- Died: 17 November 2006 (aged 82) Rome, Italy
- Occupation: Singer
- Spouse: Natalino Otto (m. 1955; died 1969)

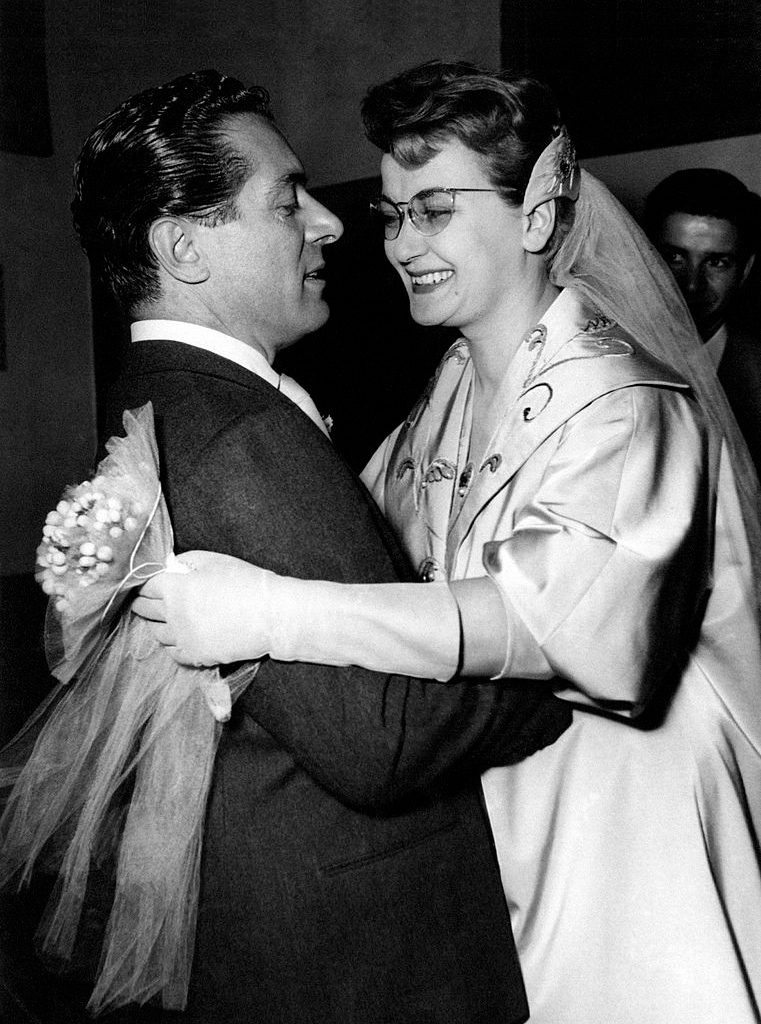
Natalino Otto and Flo Sandon's on the day of their wedding, Italy, 1955.

Mammola Sandon (29 June 1924 – 17 November 2006), known by the stage name of Flo Sandon's, was an Italian singer who was popular in the post-World War II years. She won the Sanremo Music Festival in 1953 with the song "Viale d'autunno".

== Career ==
Sandon was born in Vicenza, in Veneto. Her musical career began in 1944 when she made her stage début in a Red Cross charity show. Her stage name Sandon's came by chance - it was an oversight by the illustrator who prepared her first record cover. Her first big break as a professional vocalist came in 1947, when she sang in The Hot Club of France with two jazz legends: guitarist Django Reinhardt, and violinist Stéphane Grappelli. Celebrity came in 1952 thanks to the movie Anna directed by Alberto Lattuada and starring Silvana Mangano, Vittorio Gassman and Raf Vallone. Flo Sandon's did not appear in the movie itself, but she performed two songs on the movie soundtrack, "T'ho voluto ben" and "El Negro Zumbón". Both were great hits. Nat King Cole liked "T'ho voluto ben" so much that a few years later he recorded it with the new title "Non Dimenticar".

In 1953 Flo Sandon's took part in the Sanremo Music Festival for the first time, and won. The song was "Viale d'autunno" and it was also performed by another singer, Carla Boni. Both winners were at their first appearance at the popular song contest, and succeeded ahead of the great favorite Nilla Pizzi. The press speculated about a possible plot against Pizzi: allegedly she had been originally chosen to perform "Viale d'autunno" but was then dismissed, possibly out of spite or jealousy, and the song offered to Sandon's and Boni.

In 2nd June 1955 Flo Sandon's married Natalino Otto, also an Italian singer. They had a daughter, Silvia, who was born in 1956. They later toured together in Italy and abroad for several years.

They are credited with the discovery of one of Italy's greatest singers of all times - Mina. On the night of 24 September 1958, the Happy Boys, a band of teen-age students was playing in the Rivarolo del Re dance hall, Cremona. Otto and his wife were present, and were greatly impressed by the singer of that group. They went to meet her at the end of the concert and proposed her a trial recording session. One month later, Mina's first single was out.

Flo Sandon's competed five more times at the Sanremo Music Festival, but never won again. She however won another song contest, the Festival of Naples in 1960 with "Serenata a Mergellina".

Other hits from her repertoire include "Vorrei volare", "Kiss Me", "I Love Paris", "Passa il tempo", "Concerto d'autunno", "Verde luna", "Domani", "Que sera sera" and "Bevi con me".

Flo Sandon's died in Rome at the age of 82.
