= Gino Latilla =

Italian singer (1924–2011)

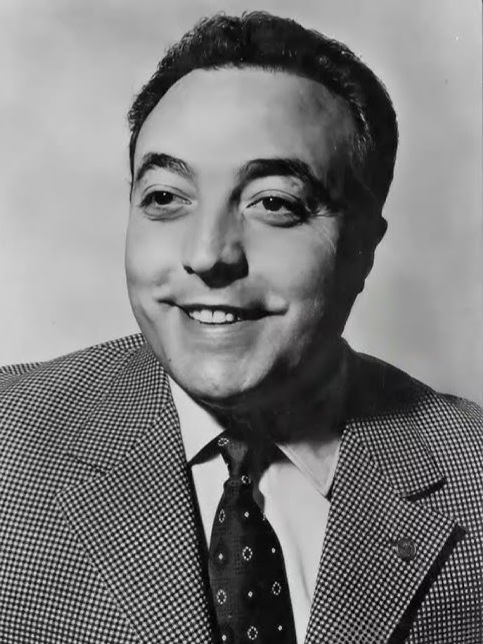
- Latilla c. 1955

Background information
- Born: Gennaro Latilla; 7 November 1924; Bari, Apulia, Kingdom of Italy
- Died: 11 September 2011 (aged 86) Florence, Tuscany, Italy
- Genre: Popular music
- Occupation: Singer
- Years active: 1947–2008
- Labels: Cetra; Mia Records

Gennaro "Gino" Latilla (7 November 1924 – 11 September 2011) was an Italian singer. In 1954, he won the Sanremo Music Festival in partnership with Giorgio Consolini, with the song "Tutte le mamme".

Preceded by Carla Boni / Flo Sandon's	Winner of the Sanremo Music Festival; Giorgio Consolini / Gino Latilla; 1954	Succeeded by Claudio Villa / Tullio Pane
