= Carla Boni =

Italian singer (1925–2009)

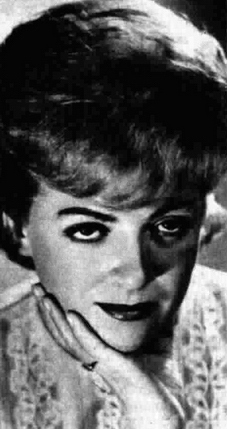
Carla Boni in 1964

Carla Gaiano (17 July 1925 in Ferrara – 17 October 2009 in Rome), known professionally as Carla Boni, was an Italian singer.

== Life and career ==
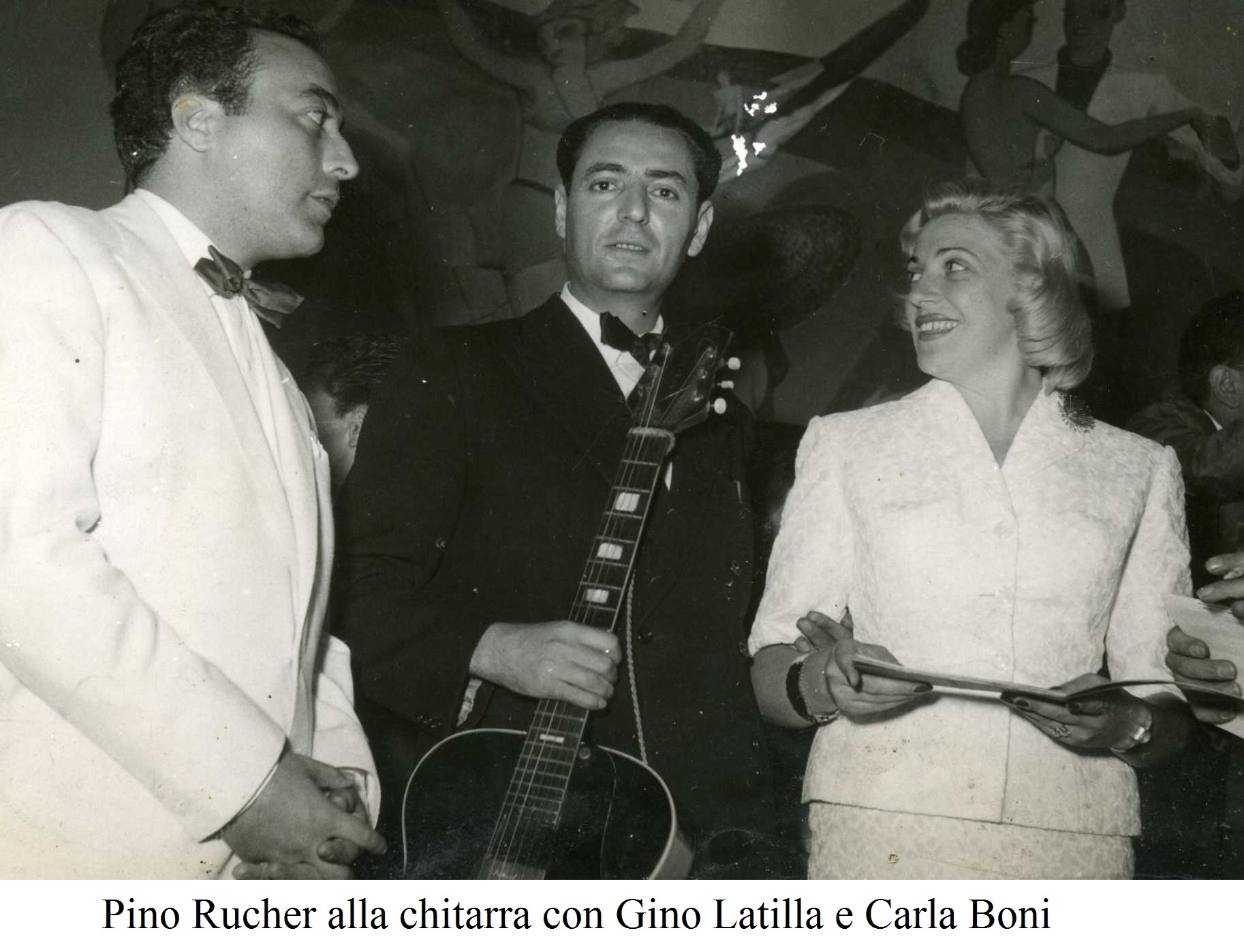
Gino Latilla, Pino Rucher, Carla Boni

Boni worked as a singer for RAI, the Italian state radio and television network, since 1951. She sang the Italian version of the song "Johnny Guitar". She then won the Sanremo Music Festival 1953 with Flo Sandon's, singing "Viale d'autunno". In 1955, Boni won the Festival di Napoli with the song "'E stelle 'e Napule", which she sang with her husband, Gino Latilla. In 1956, she released a new version of the standard "Mambo Italiano", which went on to become her greatest hit. In 1957, she released the song "La casetta in Canadà". During her career she formed a band with her husband, Nilla Pizzi and Giorgio Consolini. During the 1990s she introduced a new version of "Mambo Italiano".

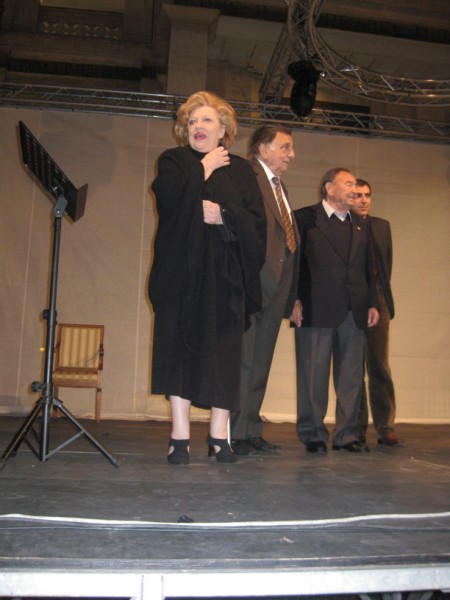
Carla Boni, Franco De Gemini, Giorgio Consolini and Carlo Posio on the stage during the event held in Manfredonia in 2008

In 2007, she pulled out of the making of an album which was to be titled Aeroplani e angeli, with songs written by Alessandro Orlando Graziani. On 5 October 2008, Carla Boni participated in an event commemorating Pino Rucher (a RAI guitarist) twelve years after his death, which was sponsored by the Municipal Authorities of Manfredonia and by the Authorities of the Province of Foggia. Although seriously ill, in 2009 she shot a music video for the song "Portami in India".

== Death ==
She died in Rome, aged 84, after a long illness. Her funeral was held at the Santa Maria in Montesanto church, known as the "Church of artists".
