= Sanremo Casino =

Italian casino

- Casinò di Sanremo (Italian)
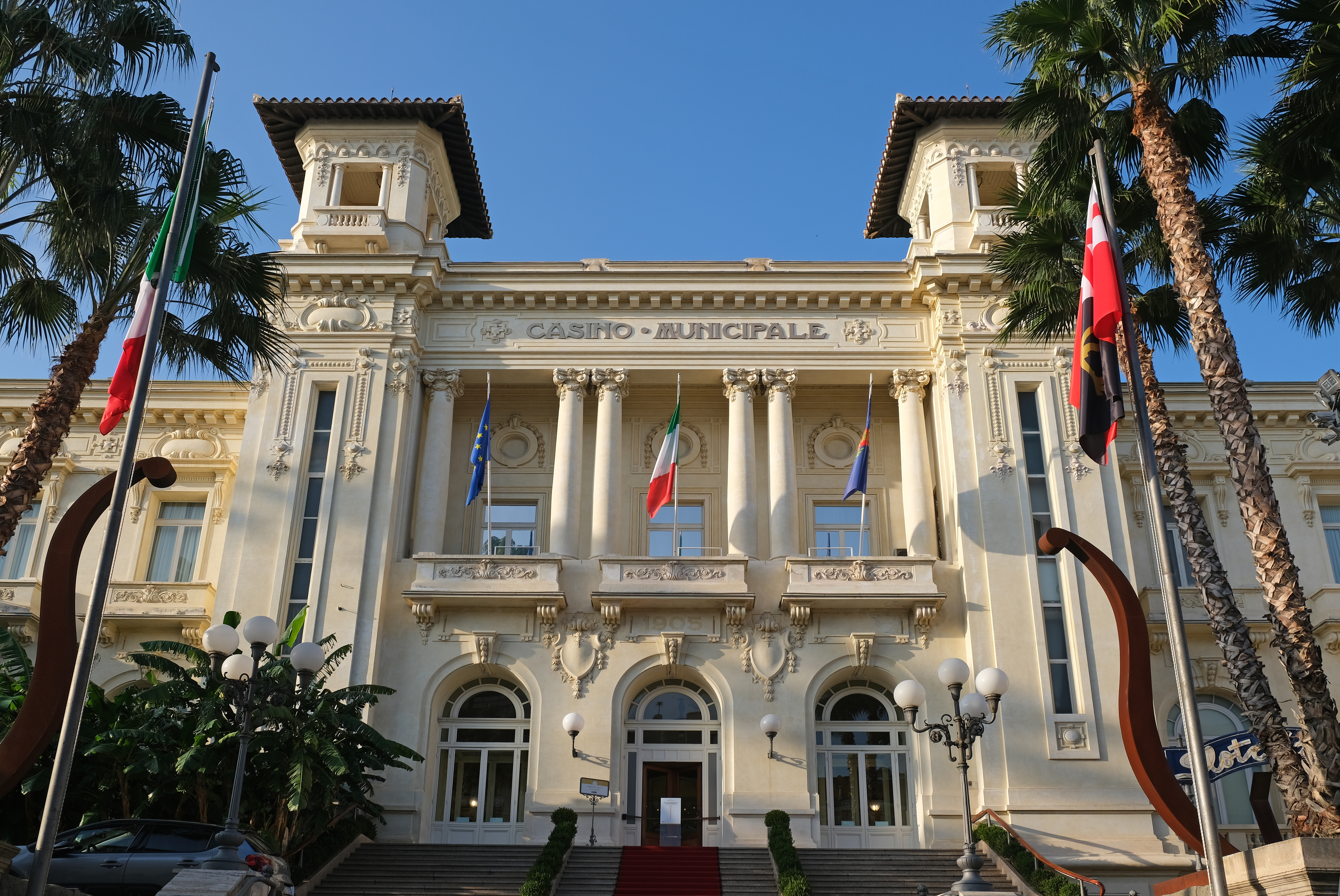
- The Sanremo Casino in 2024
- Interactive map of Sanremo Casino
- Location: Corso degli Inglesi, 18, 18038 Sanremo, Imperia, Italy; 43°48′54″N 7°46′19″E
- Opened: 14 January 1905; 121 years ago
- Casino type: Land-based
- Owner: Comune di Sanremo
- Website: www.casinosanremo.it

Sanremo Casino (official Italian: Casinò Municipale di Sanremo) is a gambling and entertainment complex located in Sanremo, on the Italian Riviera.

== History ==
The Casino's building was designed by French architect Eugène Ferret, opening 14 January 1905.

Seven different projects were submitted, resulting in the victory of Ferret, who adhered to the Art Nouveau movement, so much in vogue in France back then. Ferret was also to be the first manager of the proper gaming activities by an agreement signed on 5 November 1903.

From 1913 the Casino had its own tram connection.

In 1927, by means of normalizing a situation of tolerance that lasted for years and in order, among other things, to cope with competition from neighbouring Côte d'Azur; the RDL n. 2448 from 22 December 1927 "Ruling in favour of the City of Sanremo" was converted into Law n. 3125 of 27 December 1928; allowing the City of Sanremo, quite exceptionally, to engage in gambling activities and also allowing an arrangement of the municipal budget so to facilitate the execution of major public works.

The Casino was first born as a Kursaal, and initially its building held theatre programmes, concerts and eateries as well as serving as a meeting place for foreigners. From 1927 to 1934 the Casino was managed by Luigi De Santis who proved to be, among other things, a first-rate gamester for its knowledge of the game and the particularities of the world around it.

In 1930, one of the world's most famous chess tournaments took place at the casino. World champion Alexander Alekhine was the clear winner.

In the 1930s, Pietro Mascagni, Luigi Pirandello and Francesco Pastonchi were regular clients of the Casino, along with other prestigious artists like Francesco Cilea, Sem Benelli, Umberto Giordano, Franco Alfano, Francesco Malipiero the town. De Santis invited Marta Abba to Sanremo and offered her the Compagnia Stabile (Theatre Company) of which Pirandello was to be its Artistic Director. It also granted funds to Pastonchi for the organisation and setting up of the Literary Mondays.

On 14 April 1934, the company changed its name to Società Anonima Iniziative Turistiche (SAIT). In October of the same year, due to the death of Cavalier De Santis, the shares passed to his wife Maria Strambini who in the early months of 1935 sold them to Cavalier Angelo Belloni who took over the management.

The Sanremo Casino closed its doors on 10 June 1940. Still, undamaged by the war and two German and allied occupations, the Casino resumed its activities seven months after the end of World War II. From its first edition in 1951 until 1976, the Sanremo Casino was home of the Sanremo Music Festival.

=== 120th Anniversary celebration of the Sanremo casino's foundation ===
On 14 January 2025, an exhibition dedicated to the 120th Anniversary celebration of the Sanremo casino's foundation will be inaugurated at the Sanremo Casino, an initiative that will last throughout 2025 in collaboration with the municipality of Sanremo and other local economic and social entities.

== Gallery ==
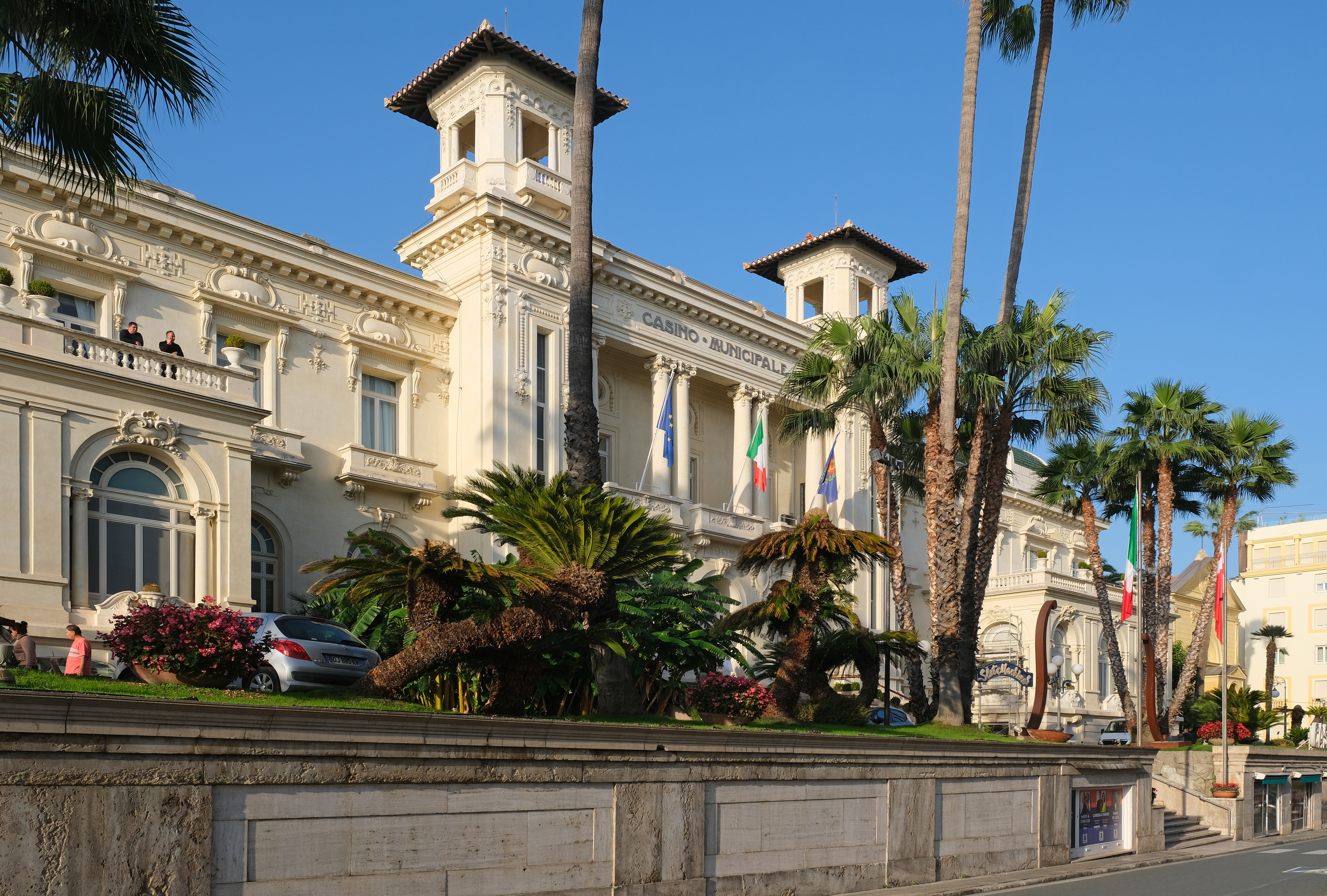

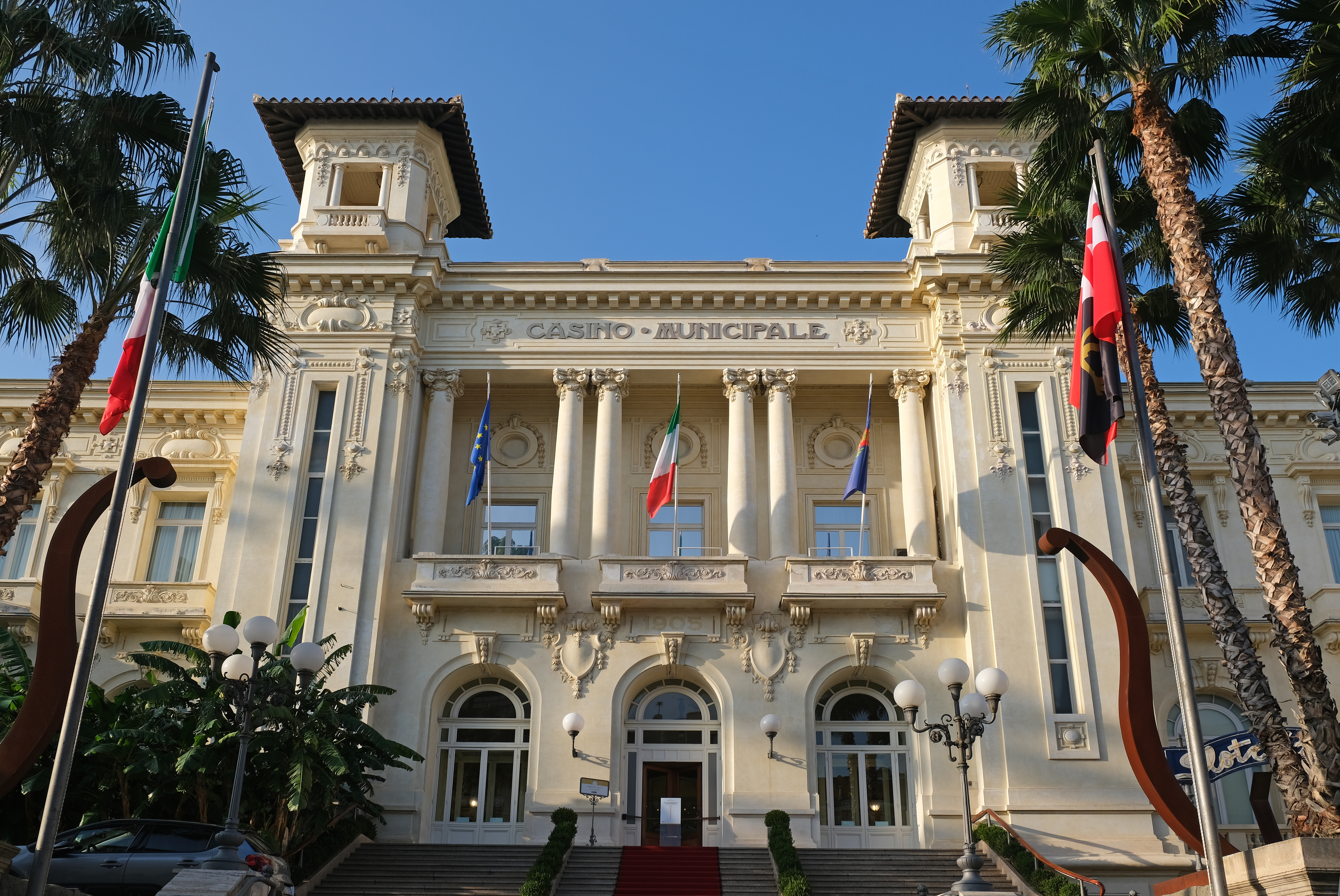

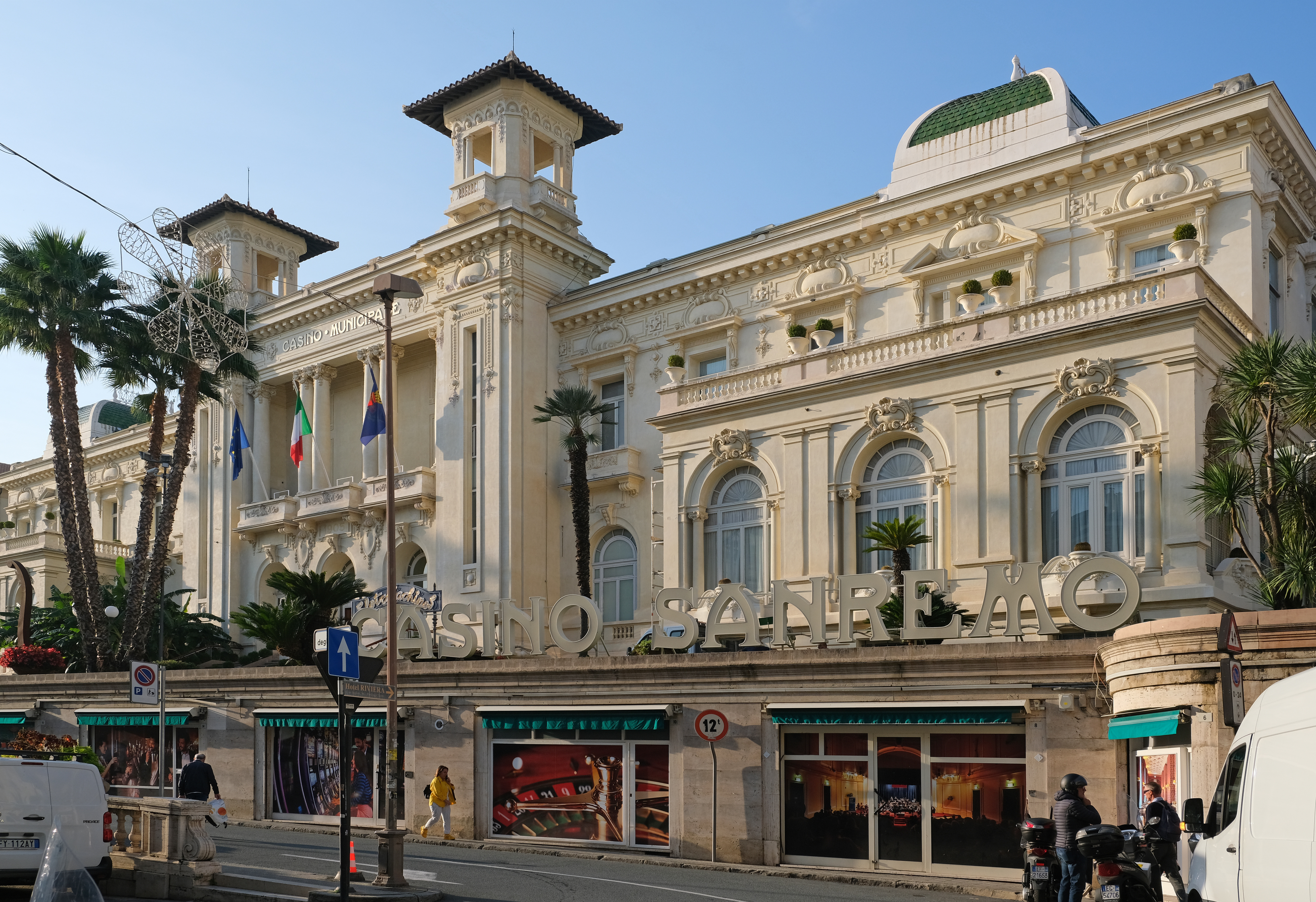

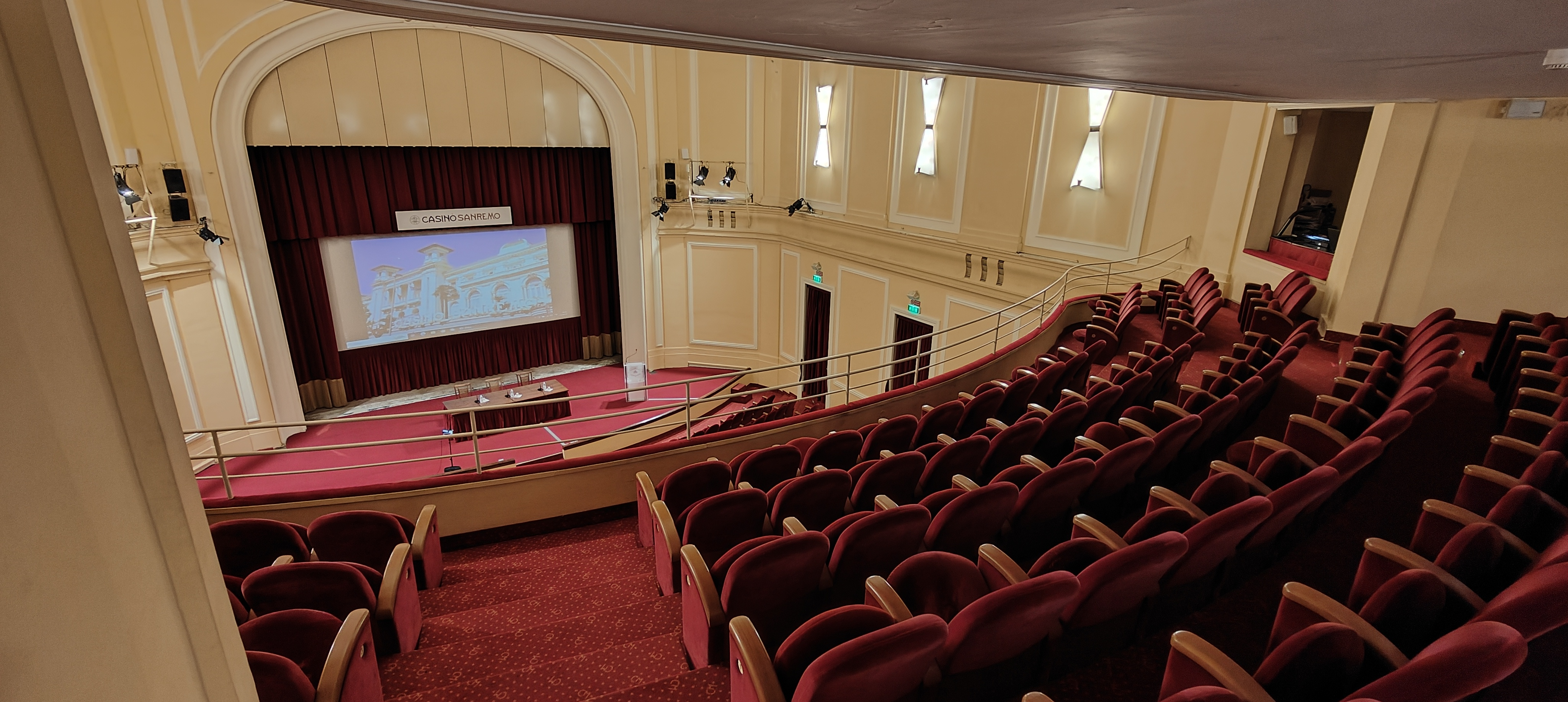

== In popular culture ==
Many movies were shot in the casino, including Lucky Night (1941), At the Bar Sport (1983), Infelici e contenti (1992), and Fortunata (2017).

== Gamblers ==
- Richard Jarecki

== See also ==
- Imperia
- Italian Riviera
- Liguria
- Sanremo
