= Duo Fasano =

Italian musical duo

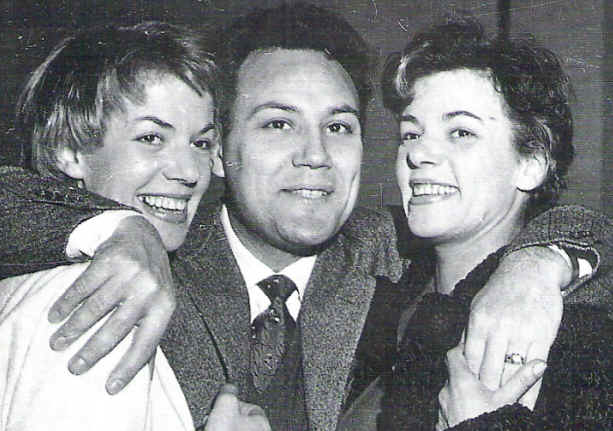
Claudio Villa and Duo Fasano (1954)

Duo Fasano were an Italian pop musical and vocal duo, mainly active in the 1950s.

== Career ==
The duo consisted of the twin sisters Secondina "Dina" Fasano (21 September 1924 – 24 November 1996) and Terzina "Delfina" Fasano (21 September 1924 – 15 December 2004). Born in Turin, the daughters of a fabrics salesman and a bookstore owner, the two sisters attended the Teaching Institute. After having won an audition by EIAR, they started performing in the early 1940s in the orchestra conducted by Carlo Prato. After the war, they consolidated their success adopting the repertoire of Trio Lescano and entering the prestigious orchestra directed by Cinico Angelini.

In 1951, the duo were among the only three artists, together with Nilla Pizzi and with Achille Togliani, to compete at the first edition of the Sanremo Music Festival. They came back to the Festival four more times, between 1952 and 1958.

In the 1960s, the sisters opened a laboratory of wigs in their hometown, limiting their musical activities to several international tours and shows. In the 1970s they collaborated with Paolo Conte using some pseudonyms.
