= I' te vurria vasà =

1900 song

instrumental version of the song

"I' te vurria vasà" (Neapolitan for "I'd love to kiss you") is a 1900 song composed by Vincenzo Russo, Eduardo Di Capua, and Alfredo Mazzucchi. A classic of the canzone napoletana, the song premiered at the Teatro Mercadante, performed by Amina Vargas.

The lyrics, a portrait of an unfulfilled love in which the lover is merely contemplating his beloved, are based on the autobiographical experiences of Vincenzo Russo, a poor son of a cobbler, whose requited love for Enrichetta Marchese was opposed by her upper-class parents. Lyrics have been paired to courtly love literature, and the song has been described as being characterized by "a pastel-coloured chromaticism, which alternates between mild melancholy and restrained happiness".

The song was recorded by dozens of artists, notably Luciano Pavarotti, Giuseppe Di Stefano, Enrico Caruso, Andrea Bocelli, José Carreras, Mina, Peppino di Capri, Claudio Villa, Marino Marini, Massimo Ranieri, Connie Francis, Roberto Murolo, Tito Schipa, Nilla Pizzi, Richard Tucker, Giacomo Rondinella, Renzo Arbore, Dik Dik, Sergio Bruni, Beniamino Gigli, Sergio Franchi, Teddy Reno, Teresa De Sio, Fred Bongusto, Fausto Cigliano, Miranda Martino, Nino D'Angelo, Aurelio Fierro, Lina Sastri, Joe Sentieri, Irene Fargo, Tullio Pane, Mirna Doris, Angela Luce, Mario Abbate, Wiesław Ochman with Krystian Ochman.

== Lyrics ==
Ah! Che bell'aria fresca, Ch'addore 'e malvarosa! E tu durmenno staje 'Ncopp'a 'sti ffronne 'e rosa. 'O sole a ppoco a ppoco Pe' 'stu ciardino sponta, 'O viento passa e vasa 'Stu ricciulillo 'nfronte. I' te vurria vasà, I' te vurria vasà, Ma 'o core nun m' 'o ddice 'E te scetà, 'E te scetà. I' mme vurria addurmì, I' mme vurria addurmì Vicin' ô sciato tuojo 'N'ora pur'i', 'N'ora pur'i'.	Ah! What fragrant, morning air, Scented with hollyhocks! And you lie sleeping On a bed of rose petals. The sun is little by little Rising above this garden, The wind brushes and kisses A little strand of hair on your forehead. I long to kiss you, I long to kiss you, But my heart does not rule me To wake you, To wake you. I long to sleep, I long to sleep Close to your breath. Beside you for just an hour, For just an hour.

== Charts ==
Peppino di Capri version

Chart (1960–1)	Peak position
Italy (Musica e dischi)	3
