= Lazzarella =

Single by Aurelio Fierro
- Language: Neapolitan; Italian
- B-side: "Napule, sole mio"
- Released: 1957
- Genre: Pop
- Length: 3 minutes
- Label: Durium
- Songwriter(s): Domenico Modugno, Riccardo Pazzaglia

Aurelio Fierro singles chronology
"Lucianella" (1957)	"Lazzarella" (1957)	"Serenatella 'e maggio" (1957)

"Lazzarella" is a famous Italian song composed by Domenico Modugno and Riccardo Pazzaglia. The song, with a performance by Aurelio Fierro, ranked second at the fifth edition of the Festival di Napoli. It also got an immediate commercial success, peaking at second place on the Italian hit parade.

The song was later covered by several artists, including the same Modugno, Dalida, Renato Carosone, Nino D'Angelo, Roberto Murolo, Massimo Ranieri, Laila Kinnunen, Claudio Villa, Eugenio Bennato, Pietra Montecorvino, Marino Marini, Nunzio Gallo, Nilla Pizzi, Jos Cleber, Giacomo Rondinella, Mario Trevi, Olavi Virta, Renzo Arbore, Jo Basile (accordion), and the tenor Aldo Conti.

The song also inspired a comedy film with the same name, directed by Carlo Ludovico Bragaglia and starring Alessandra Panaro and Terence Hill.

== Meaning ==
The song is written in the Neapolitan language, which is related to Italian.

Lazzarella, the title of the song, is a colloquial word that refers to a woman who is a "little scoundrel" or a "little rascal". Compare it with the Italian word lazzarone, which means "scoundrel, rascal", and which has the masculine grammatical gender.

For instance, the final four lines of the song, "Ma, lazzarella comme sì, tu nun me pienze proprio a me, e rire pe m’o fà capì, ca perdo o tiempo appriesso a te" mean "But a little rascal as you are, you're not thinking about me at all, and you laugh to make me understand, that I’m wasting my time in chasing you".

== Track listing ==
7" single – Ld A 6102

1. "Lazzarella" (Domenico Modugno, Riccardo Pazzaglia)
2. "Napule, Sole Mio!" (Domenico Furnò, Nino Oliviero)
