= Trio Lescano =

Hungarian-Dutch-Italian vocal group

- Trio Lescano in Giacomo Gentilomo's film Ecco la radio! (1940)

Background information
- Origin: Amsterdam, the Netherlands
- Genres: Swing; jazz; traditional pop; easy listening
- Years active: 1936–1943; 1946–1950
- Labels: Parlophon; Cetra Records
- Past members: Alexandrina Eveline Leschan; Judith Leschan; Catherine Matje Leschan; Maria Bria
- Website: www.trio-lescano.it

The Trio Lescano was a female vocal group singing in Italian from 1936 to 1950, originally consisting of Hungarian-Dutch sisters Alessandra Lescano (Alexandrina Eveline Leschan; 1910–1987), Giuditta Lescano (Judith Leschan; 1913–1976) and Caterina "Caterinetta" Lescano (Catherine Matje Leschan; 1919–1965). Caterinetta left the group in 1946 and Italian singer Maria Bria (1925–2026) took her place.

== History ==
=== Origins ===
The three Leschan sisters were the daughters of Alexander Leschan, a Hungarian acrobat born in 1877 in Budapest, and Eva de Leeuwe, a Dutch Jewish operetta singer born in Amsterdam in 1892. In the Netherlands, where they were born and raised, they worked as circus acrobats. Though they were born in the Netherlands and Dutch native speakers, the three sisters were Hungarian citizens until they acquired the Italian citizenship.

Consequently to an accident, the father became disabled and the mother, a vaudevillian, decided to form an acrobatic dance group: however, only the elder sisters Alexandrina and Judith joined in under the management of Enrico Portino. They formed the Sunday Sisters and performed in Europe, Syria and Lebanon; Catherine was too young and stayed in a boarding school in Amsterdam.

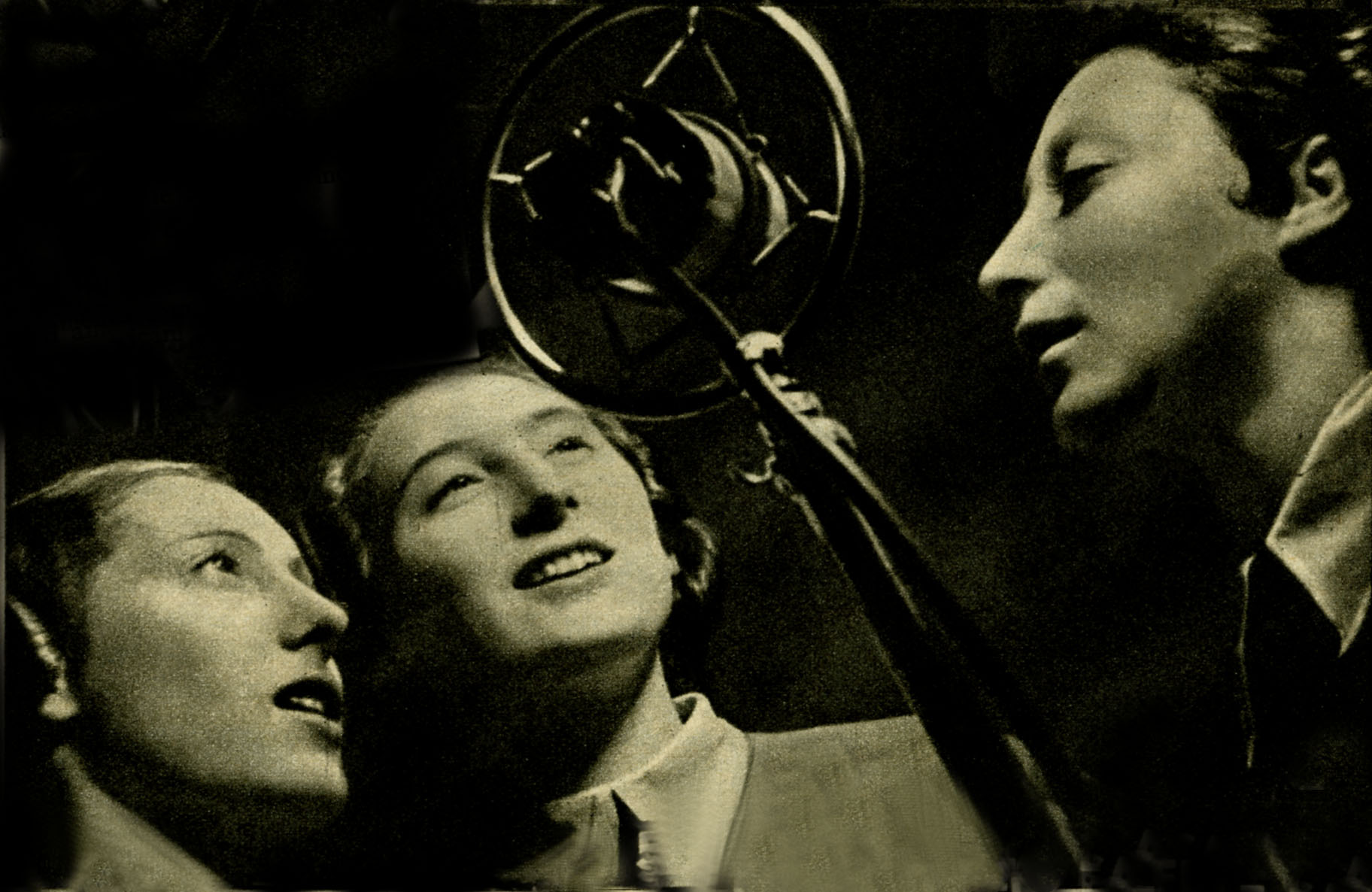
Trio Lescano in 1938

In 1935 they got to Turin, where maestro Carlo Prato, the artistic director of the local EIAR, noted them and decided to raise them as a vocal trio devoted to harmonic singing. Their first reference group was the American Boswell Sisters.

The three sisters signed with Parlophon, a record label at the time distributed by Cetra. Their name was Trio vocale sorelle Lescano ("Lescano Sisters vocal trio", shortened to Trio Lescano), their names and surname were Italianized due to Fascist language policies and their first song, "Guarany Guaranà", was recorded on February 22, 1936, with the EIAR orchestra directed by Cinico Angelini, and it was published in March.

=== Success ===
The years between 1937 and 1941 were fundamental for them: they joined the Orchestra Cetra as singers, directed by Pippo Barzizza. This event gave them a sudden and extraordinary popularity and they were chosen to open the experimental broadcasting of the "radiovision", the future Italian television. In 1940 they performed a musical number ("Oh! Ma-ma!") in the film Ecco la radio! ("Here Is the Radio!"), directed by Giacomo Gentilomo and dedicated to EIAR. They recorded a great number of songs under the direction of Pippo Barzizza. On March 30, 1942, on Benito Mussolini's proposal, King Victor Emmanuel III granted them Italian citizenship. The news – though at the time the population was concerned about the war – reached a large audience on daily newspapers, that proposed definitions for them as "the three Graces of the microphone", "the phenomenon of the century", "the sisters who fulfill the mystery of the Holy Trinity", as Sorelle Marinetti reported in their show Non ce ne importa niente.

In 1943 they performed in the revue Sognamo insieme by Nelli and Mangini, with Wanda Osiris (then known as Vanda Osiri), Carlo Dapporto, Letizia Gissi, Nino Gallizio and Gianna Giuffré, with original musical compositions by Giuseppe Anepeta and choreographies by Vera Petri, directed by Mario Mangini himself. During their career, they often sang alongside famous singers of the period such as Ernesto Bonino ("La famiglia canterina" by Bixio Cherubini), Enzo Aita ("Ma le gambe" by Bracchi and D'Anzi), Maria Jottini ("Maramao perché sei morto?" by Consiglio e Panzeri), Oscar Carboni ("Firenze sogna" by Cesare Cesarini, "Ti pi tin" and "Lungo il margine del fiume") and Silvana Fioresi ("Pippo non lo sa" by Kramer and "Il pinguino innamorato" by Casiroli, Consiglio and Rastelli).

They had however a very rich repertoire of their own, particularly swing songs such as "Tulipan" (cover of the song "Tulip Time" originally performed by the American Andrews Sisters, with music by María Grever and Italian lyrics by Riccardo Morbelli). The style of the trio was characterized by refined vocal virtuosity on swing and jazz harmonization. As radio stars, they were so popular as to be invited to court by Prince Umberto of Savoy. At a party, Benito Mussolini himself showed his admiration for them.

=== Rumors of their arrest in 1942 ===
In a 1985 interview, Alexandrina Leschan claimed she had been arrested by Fascist police after a concert at the Teatro Grattacielo in Genoa. She reported that her sisters and she were taken to the Marassi jail under charges of espionage. She blamed upon the Codevilla sisters, members of the Trio Capinere who envied their popularity. Alexandrina also reported that her sisters and she were obliged to translate interrogations of the partisan prisoners because of their familiarity with the German language.

Twenty-five years later, a research published by Virgilio Zanolla contradicted what was reported by Alexandrina. Zanolla, after cross-checking Alexandrina's 1985 statements with the Genoese chronicles of the time, maintained that the Lescano sisters were never arrested in the considered period, nor earlier or later. In fact, in November 1942, the trio gave several successful concerts during a two-week period. Zanolla himself assumed that Alexandrina came up with the story forty-years later in order to erase any rumor that they were compromised with Fascism. The assumption was confirmed by Mrs. Maria Rosaria Epicureo who claimed that the Lescano sisters overstated their summons at the police station.

=== End of the trio ===
After the war, in June 1946, Catherine left the group, officially to get married. In fact, her resignment was due to economic disputes with her sisters and mother. 21-year-old singer Maria Bria took her place. After a two-year Italian concert tour, she left for South America with Alexandrina and Judith on a traveling show. They remained together until 1950, when the trio broke up in Caracas, Venezuela, after Maria Bria had quit. Their fans never realized that Catherine had been replaced, and Maria never received any payment for her job. Once she was back to Italy, Bria was employed at the Turin Municipality and went on to retire in 1977. It was only then that the general public knew about the 1946 replacement, when Paolo Limiti invited her to the TV show Ci vediamo su RAI 1 to tell her story. However, in a 2010 interview, Bria reported that the trio split up when Judith got married and left.

Alexandrina and Judith stayed in Venezuela and in 1955 Catherine, who was the younger sister, left Turin to join them back. She was the first of the three to die, of cancer at the age of 46 on October 3, 1965, in Caracas. Alexandrina, the eldest, went back to Italy and died in Fidenza in 1987. At the time, nothing was known about the third sister, who had presumably died in Venezuela in the Seventies, though there are news on the Internet that she died in 2007. In the years 2010–2011, the Italian TV show Chi l'ha visto? even investigated on the possible time and place of her death. A 2013 resolution of the Turin Municipality, concerning the plaque-laying ceremony at the place where the trio had lived, reports 1976 and Venezuela as the year and place of Judith's death.
