= Accarezzame =

Single by Teddy Reno
- B-side: "'Na voce 'na chitarra e o poco 'e luna"
- Released: 1955
- Genre: Pop
- Label: CGD
- Songwriter(s): Nisa, Pino Calvi

Teddy Reno singles chronology
"Un napoletano a Milano" (1955)	"Accarezzame" (1955)	"Nisciuna è cchiù bella 'e te" (1955)

"Accarezzame" (Neapolitan for "caress me") is a song composed by Nisa and Pino Calvi. The song premiered at the 1954 edition of the Festa di Piedigrotta, performed by Teddy Reno.

The song, a portrait of a romantic approach in a wheat field, went on to be a classic of the Canzone Napoletana, and it was later covered by numerous artists, including Nilla Pizzi, Ornella Vanoni, Gigliola Cinquetti, Roberto Murolo, Peppino di Capri, Fausto Cigliano, Fred Bongusto, Perez Prado, Natalino Otto, Peter Van Wood, Iva Zanicchi, Massimo Ranieri, Fausto Papetti, Achille Togliani.

== Track listing ==
7" single – RE 17

1. "Accarezzame" (Nisa, Pino Calvi)
2. " 'Na voce 'na chitarra e o poco 'e luna" (Carlo Alberto Rossi, Ugo Calise)
