= Sanremo Music Festival 1952 =

Italian song contest (2nd edition)

Dates and venue
- Semi-final 1: 28 January 1952
- Semi-final 2: 29 January 1952
- Final: 30 January 1952
- Venue: Sanremo Casino; Sanremo, Italy

Organisation
- Broadcaster: Radio Audizioni Italiane (RAI)
- Musical director: Cinico Angelini
- Presenters: Nunzio Filogamo

Vote
- Number of entries: 20
- Winner: "Vola colomba" Nilla Pizzi

The Sanremo Music Festival 1952 (Italian: Festival di Sanremo 1952), officially the 2nd Italian Song Festival (2º Festival della canzone italiana), was the second annual Sanremo Music Festival, held at the Sanremo Casino in Sanremo between 28 and 30 January 1952, and broadcast by Radio Audizioni Italiane (RAI). The show was presented by Nunzio Filogamo.

According to the rules of this edition every song was performed by a couple of singers or groups, with the five artists selected performing multiple songs. The winner of the festival was "Vola colomba", performed by Nilla Pizzi, who occupied all the podium places in that edition.

== Participants and results ==
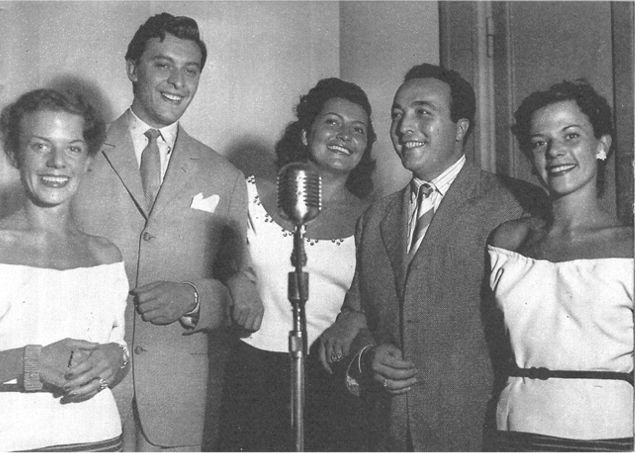
Group photo of some of the competing singers, Duo Fasano (left and right sides), Achille Togliani, Nilla Pizzi and Gino Latilla

Participants and results
Song	Artist(s)	Songwriter(s)	Rank
"Vola colomba"	Nilla Pizzi	Bixio Cherubini; Carlo Concina	1
"Papaveri e papere"	Nilla Pizzi	Nino Rastelli; Mario Panzeri; Vittorio Mascheroni	2
"Una donna prega"	Nilla Pizzi	Pinchi; Virgilio Panzuti	3
"Madonna delle rose"	Oscar Carboni	Giuseppe Fiorelli; Mario Ruccione	4
"Un disco dall'Italia"	Gino Latilla	Nicola Salerno; Giovanni D'Anzi	5
"L'attesa"	Gino Latilla	Biri; Nino Ravasini	6
"Perché le donne belle"	Oscar Carboni	Alessandro Sopranzi; Giovanni Fassino	7
"Vecchia mura"	Achille Togliani	Filibello; Pier Emilio Bassi	8
"Libro di novelle"	Achille Togliani	Libero Citi; Mauro Casini	9
"Nel regno dei sogni"	Nilla Pizzi and Achille Togliani	Annibale Papetti; Carlo Alberto Rossi	10
"Al ritmo di carrozzella"	Duo Fasano	Enzo Luigi Poletto; Piero Pavesio	Eliminated
"Buonanotte (Ai bimbi del mondo)"	Nilla Pizzi and Duo Fasano	Ettore Minoretti; Aldo Zara	Eliminated
"Cantate e sorridete"	Oscar Carboni	Gian Carlo Testoni; Fabio Fabor; Carlo Donida	Eliminated
"Due gattini"	Duo Fasano	Tata Giacobetti; Gorni Kramer; Trinacria	Eliminated
"Il valzer di Nonna Speranza"	Nilla Pizzi and Duo Fasano	Gian Carlo Testoni; Saverio Seracini	Eliminated
"La collanina"	Achille Togliani	Gian Carlo Testoni; Dino Olivieri	Eliminated
"Malinconica tarantella"	Gino Latilla	Gian Carlo Testoni; Enzo Ceragioli	Eliminated
"Ninna nanna ai sogni perduti"	Nilla Pizzi	Pier Emilio Bassi; Mario Panzeri; Gian Carlo Testoni	Eliminated
"Pura fantasia"	Gino Latilla	Aminta; Armando Fragna	Eliminated
"Vecchio tram"	Duo Fasano	Gian Luigi Callegari	Eliminated

== Broadcast ==
All shows were broadcast on Secondo Programma, beginning at 22:00 CET.
