= Parlami d'amore Mariù =

1932 Italian song

"Parlami d'amore Mariù" (lit. "Tell me about love, Mariù"), known in its English-language versions as "Tell Me That You Love Me", is a 1932 Italian song composed by Cesare Andrea Bixio (music) and Ennio Neri (lyrics).

Originally part of the comedy film What Scoundrels Men Are!, in which it was performed by Vittorio De Sica, it became a classic of Italian music and achieved considerable popularity worldwide. It was the first song recorded by Natalino Otto, and one of the first songs recorded by Luigi Tenco, who covered the song in English under the pseudonym Gordon Cliff. In 1975, the song topped the Italian hit parade with a version by Mal.

Artists who covered the song also include Mina, Juliette Gréco, Luciano Pavarotti, José Carreras, Claudio Villa, Mario Lanza, Mario Del Monaco, Beniamino Gigli, Ferruccio Tagliavini, Jovanotti, Peppino di Capri, Vic Damone, Jerry Vale, Milva, Dalida, Enrico Rava, Jonas Kaufmann, Alfie Boe, Russell Watson, Peter Schreier, Zarah Leander, Giorgio Gaber, Fred Buscaglione, Johnny Dorelli, Achille Togliani, Tino Rossi, Lys Gauty, Patachou, Suzy Delair, Koen Crucke, Narciso Parigi, Oscar Carboni, Antonella Ruggiero, Emilio Pericoli, La Crus, The Ray Charles Singers, The Gaylords, Gisele MacKenzie, Lara Saint Paul, Carlo Buti, and Robertino.

== Charts ==
Peppino di Capri version

Chart (1961)	Peak position
Italy (Musica e dischi)	2

Mal version

Chart (1975)	Peak position
Italy (Musica e dischi)	1
