= Ascoltami (disambiguation) =

Ascoltami may refer to:

- Ascoltami, a film directed by Carlo Campogalliani
- "Ascoltami", a 1965 song by Louiselle, also covered by Dalida, written Carlo Rossi and Vittorio Bezzi
