= Festival di Napoli =

Italian song contest

Festival della Canzone Napoletana (Festival of Neapolitan Song)
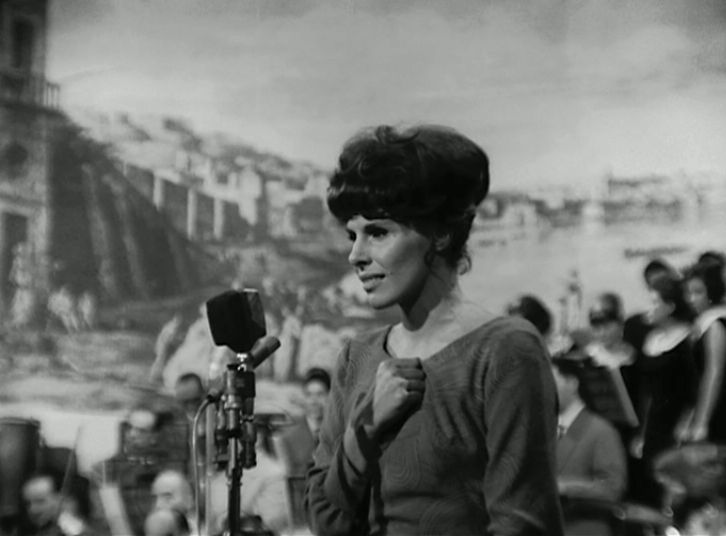
- Ornella Vanoni at the festival in 1964
- Genre: Neapolitan song; folk; classical; pop; rock
- Location: Italy
- Years active: 1952–1971; 1981; 1998–2004
- Founders: RAI

The Festival della Canzone Napoletana (lit. 'Festival of Neapolitan Song'), commonly known as the Festival di Napoli, is a Neapolitan song contest. The first edition was held in 1952 and the last in 2004. From 1952 to 1970 the show was broadcast on RAI and from 1998 to 2004, in a differently spirited version, by Rete 4.

== History ==
A symbol of Neapolitan song of the second half of the twentieth century, the Festival della Canzone Napoletana was born in Naples in 1952, the year following the birth of the Sanremo Music Festival.

Among the protagonists of the Festival from 1952 to 1970 would be such Neapolitan singers as Sergio Bruni, Aurelio Fierro, Nunzio Gallo, Maria Paris, Giacomo Rondinella, Mario Abbate, Gloria Christian, Mario Trevi, Fausto Cigliano, Franco Ricci, Mirna Doris, Tony Astarita, Mario Merola, Enzo Del Forno, Peppino di Capri, Gianni Nazzaro, Nino Fiore, Gegè Di Giacomo, Tullio Pane, Peppino Gagliardi, Giulietta Sacco. They would be joined by such singers from the Sanremo Festival, as Carla Boni, Wilma De Angelis, Domenico Modugno, Ornella Vanoni, Claudio Villa, Don Backy, Giorgio Gaber, Julie, Fred Bongusto, Nilla Pizzi, Oscar Carboni, Betty Curtis, Giorgio Consolini, Tony Dallara, Jula De Palma, Johnny Dorelli, Equipe 84, Louiselle, Los Marcellos Ferial, Marino Marini, Miranda Martino, Milva, Gino Latilla, Anna Identici, Wilma Goich, I Giganti, Luciano Tajoli, Teo Teocoli, Achille Togliani, Iva Zanicchi, Carmen Villani, Luciano Virgili, Narciso Parigi, Katyna Ranieri, Flo Sandon's, Lara Saint Paul, Memo Remigi, Dean Reed, Anna German, Mei Lang Chang, Nini Rosso, Robertino, Teddy Reno and authors as Franco Franchi, Oreste Lionello, Nino Taranto, Renato Rascel, Ombretta Colli, Lando Fiorini, Beniamino Maggio, and Angela Luce.

As presenters the festival would see, over the years, such people as Nunzio Filogamo, Enzo Tortora, Pippo Baudo, Mike Bongiorno, Corrado, Daniele Piombi.

Interrupted in 1971, after many organizational efforts it returned to the city in 1981, taking the name "Festival di Napoli '81". The show, divided into three nights and organized by DAN with the help from RAI and the patronage of the Campania Region, was presented by Franco Sulfites, assisted by Maria Laura Soldano, and broadcast in full color from the Metropolitan Theatre of Naples on the television channel Rai Tre from 22.30 until the end. It was also broadcast on the radio on Rai's second station from 22.45.

After that edition, the Festival, once again, was interrupted for a long period of time. In 1998 it returned, though with a different spirit and different results, on Rete 4 and was held regularly until 2004, when it ceased again.

== Winners ==
| Year | Artist | Song |
|---|---|---|
| 1952 | Nilla Pizzi and Franco Ricci | "Desiderio 'e Sole" |
| 1953 | The Festival di Napoli was not held this year. See Note 1 below. | |
| 1954 | Tullio Pane and Achille Togliani | "Suonno d'ammore" |
| 1955 | Gino Latilla with Carla Boni and Maria Paris | "'E stelle 'e Napule" |
| 1956 | Grazia Gresi and Aurelio Fierro | "Guaglione" |
| 1957 | Marisa Del Frate | "Malinconico autunno" |
| 1958 | Nunzio Gallo and Aurelio Fierro | "Vurria" |
| 1959 | Fausto Cigliano and Teddy Reno | "Sarrà chi sa?" |
| 1960 | Ruggero Cori and Flo Sandon's | "Serenata a Margellina" |
| 1961 | Aurelio Fierro and Betty Curtis | "Tu si' 'a malincunia" |
| 1962 | Sergio Bruni and Gloria Christian | "Marechiaro marechiaro" |
| 1963 | Claudio Villa and Maria Paris | "Jammo ja'" |
| 1964 | Domenico Modugno and Ornella Vanoni | "Tu si' 'na cosa grande" |
| 1965 | Aurelio Fierro and Tony Astarita | "Serenata all'acqua 'e mare" |
| 1966 | Sergio Bruni and Robertino | "Bella" |
| 1967 | Nino Taranto and I Balordi | "'O matusa" |
| 1968 | Mirna Doris and Tony Astarita | "Core spezzato" |
| 1969 | Aurelio Fierro and Mirna Doris | "Preghiera a 'na mamma" |
| 1970 | Peppino di Capri and Gianni Nazzaro | "Me chiamme ammore" |
| 1971 | The Festival di Napoli was not held this year. See Note 2 below. | |
| 1981 | Mario Da Vinci | "'A mamma" |
| 1998 | Ylenia | "Ehi Pascà!" |
| 1999 | Gianni Fiorellino | "Girasole" |
| 2000 | Pia Paterno | "Sempre con te" |
| 2001 | Mario and Francesco Merola | "L'urdemo emigrante" |
| 2002 | Anna Calemme e gli Istentales | "Vorrei" |
| 2003 | Roberto Polisano | "Amore senza parole" |
| 2004 | Marika | "Astrigneme" |

=== Notes ===
- Note 1: In 1953, the festival was not held because it was initially designed to be biennial (held every other year). Later, the festival's management organization reconsidered.
- Note 2: In 1971 (Festival di Napoli 1971), the festival was not held because it was suspended by RAI.

== See also ==
- Canzone Napoletana
- List of historic rock and pop festivals
- List of music festivals in Italy
