= Astarita =

Astarita may refer to:

- Gennaro Astarita, Italian composer
- Mark Astarita, American securities attorney
- Giuseppe Astarita, Italian architect
- Tony Astarita, Italian singer
- Astarita Stakes, American non-graded Thoroughbred horse race
