= Tony Astarita =

Italian singer (1939–1998)

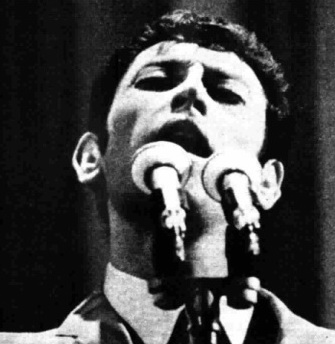
- Born: Antonio Astarita; 14 April 1939; Naples, Italy
- Died: 15 April 1998 (aged 59); Naples, Italy
- Occupation: Singer

Antonio Astarita (14 April 1939 – 15 April 1998), best known as Tony Astarita was an Italian Canzone Napoletana singer.

== Life and career ==
Born in Naples, Astarita made his official debut in 1962 participating to a contest for upcoming singers. In 1965 he won the Festival di Napoli with the song "Serenata all'acqua 'e mare", in couple with Aurelio Fierro. He won again the festival in 1969, performing together with Mirna Doris the song "Preghiera a 'na mamma". During the peak of his career he participated to other well known musical events, such as Canzonissima and Un disco per l'estate, where he launched the hit "La cotta".

Astarita died of a tumour on 15 April 1998, while he was preparing a new album.

== Discography ==
Album

- 1966: Serenata 'mbriaca (King, LFK 0062005)
- 1967: Tony Astarita (Kappaò, SCT 30002)
- 1970: Nu peccatore (King, NLU 62011)
- 1975: ’Nu poco e Napule (Zeus, BS 3027)
- 1976: Canzone amara (ATA, NDL 0009)
- 1980: Vecchia Napoli (Holiday, HLP 1001)
- 1981: Tony Astarita 1981 (Holiday, HLP 1003)
