= Sanremo Music Festival 1951 =

Italian song contest (1st edition)

Dates and venue
- First night: 29 January 1951
- Second night: 30 January 1951
- Final night: 31 January 1951
- Venue: Sanremo Casino; Sanremo, Italy

Organisation
- Broadcaster: Radio Audizioni Italiane (RAI)
- Musical director: Cinico Angelini
- Artistic director: Giulio Razzi
- Presenter: Nunzio Filogamo

Vote
- Number of entries: 20
- Winner: "Grazie dei fiori" Nilla Pizzi

The Sanremo Music Festival 1951 (Italian: Festival di Sanremo 1951), officially the Italian Song Festival (1º Festival della canzone italiana), was the inaugural edition of the Sanremo Music Festival, held at the Sanremo Casino in Sanremo, Liguria, between 29 and 31 January 1951. It was organised by Radio Audizioni Italiane (RAI) in cooperation with the Sanremo Casino and broadcast on RAI's second radio station Rete Rossa. The shows were presented by actor Nunzio Filogamo.

The festival spanned over three nights and featured twenty songs, all of which were performed by the singers Nilla Pizzi, Achille Togliani and Duo Fasano. The winning song was "Grazie dei fiori", composed by Saverio Seracini, written by Gian Carlo Testoni and Mario Panzeri, and performed by Nilla Pizzi.

== Origins ==
One of the first instances of a national song festival in Italy dedicated to promoting new music took place in Rimini in 1936 and 1937. In 1948 and 1949, two editions of the music festival Festival nazionale della canzone italiana ("Italian National Song Festival") were held in Viareggio, Tuscany and broadcast on radio.

In the aftermath of the second world war, the city of Sanremo began preparation to reopen the Sanremo Casino after the war caused the government to decree its closure in 1940. During autumn of 1945, the city's Comitato di Liberazione Nazionale (CLN) administration appointed a study commission to devise a new management program for the casino. Among the proposals was a music festival conceptualized by politician Amilcare Rambaldi scheduled to take place in June 1946. However, the idea failed to materialise.

A few years later, Rambaldi reproposed the concept of the Sanremo festival to journalist and radio writer Angelo Nizza, head of the Sanremo Casino's press office. The idea was picked up by Pier Busseti, the concessionaire of the casino, who discussed it with Giulio Razzi, a radio director at Radio Audizioni Italiane (RAI). It received approval from Razzi, and eventually an agreement was reached with RAI to stage the event in 1951.

== Format ==
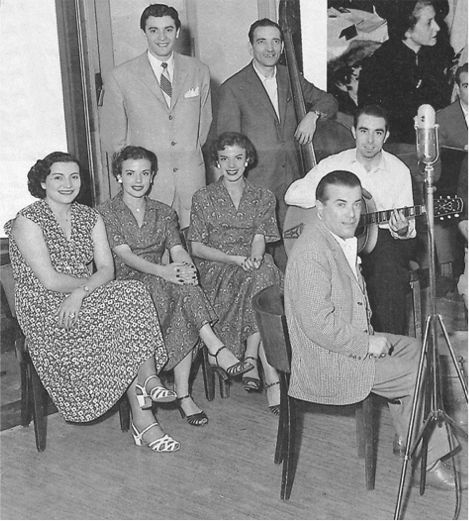
Group photo of the competing singers with the orchestra; sitting, left to right: Nilla Pizzi and Duo Fasano; standing, left: Achille Togliani

The festival's inaugural edition was organised by RAI in cooperation with the Sanremo Casino, taking place in the casino's ballroom. The event was advertised with the premise of elevating the quality of Italian popular music by fostering a revival of a distinct Italian musical identity. Additionally, all of the competing songs would be added to the repertoires of RAI's radio orchestras after the festival's conclusion.

The music in the program was provided by the Della canzone orchestra and the musical ensemble Angelini e otto strumenti, both under the direction of conductor Cinico Angelini. Three singers that had toured with Angelini's orchestra, Nilla Pizzi, Achille Togliani and Duo Fasano, were chosen to perform the competing songs. The singers rehearsed with Angelini and his orchestra at a RAI studio in Turin over the span of a month before the event.

The stage was adorned with multi-coloured festoons and featured a backdrop of a staircase upwards framed by a large window. Between performances, artists waited on stage by taking a seat next to the orchestra rather than returning backstage.

A three-night format was chosen for the event. In each night, the ten competing songs were presented within a forty-five minute period broadcast live on the radio. During an interval of another forty-five minutes, the votes of audience members present in the casino's ballroom were collected, while entertainment was provided by the orchestra. For the first two nights, after the votes were tallied, the five songs with the most votes were selected for the final. In the final night, the ten selected songs were performed again, and the top three songs as decided by the audience were awarded during the 30-minute second broadcast at the end of the show.

== Competing entries ==
A listing published in the magazine Radiocorriere invited interested music publishers to submit one original song by an Italian composer for the competition. 240 submissions were received by RAI from as many music publishers. The submissions were reviewed by a specially appointed committee, chaired by Giulio Razzi, which met several times in Rome to select twenty compositions to partake in the event.

Competing entries
Song	Composer(s)	Lyricist(s)
"Al mercato di Pizzighettone"	Nino Ravasini	Aldo Locatelli
"È l'alba"	Armando Trovajoli	Gian Carlo Testoni
"Eco fra gli abeti"	Carlo Alberto Rossi	Enzo Bonagura
"Famme durmì"	Virgilio Panzuti	Danpa
"Grazie dei fiori"	Saverio Seracini	Gian Carlo Testoni; Mario Panzeri
"Ho pianto (una volta sola)"	Dino Olivieri	Pinchi
"La cicogna distratta"	Lino Carrel	Aldo Valleroni; Da Rovere
"La luna si veste d'argento"	Vittorio Mascheroni	Biri
"La margherita"	Ester B. Valdes	
"Mai più"	Franco Fuselli	Filippo Rolando
"Mani che si cercano"	P.G. Redi	Giovanna Colombi
"Mia cara Napoli"	Mario Ruccione; Salvatore Mazzocco	Salvatore Mazzocco
"Notte di Sanremo"	Enzo Luigi Poletto	
"Oro di Napoli"	Angelo Brigada	Umberto Bertini
"Sedici anni"	Livio Gambetti; Mario Mariotti	Astro Mari
"Sei fatta per me"	Giovanni Fassino	Guido Quattrini
"Serenata a nessuno"	Walter Colì	
"Sorrentinella"	Saverio Seracini	Arrigo
"Sotto il mandorlo"	Carlo Donida	Gian Carlo Testoni; Mario Panzeri
"Tutto è finito"	Danilo Errico; Sergio Odorici	Otello Odorici

== Shows ==
The festival was hosted as a café-chantant event; audience members sat down at tables and waiters circulated around the room serving drinks. Spectators were gathered from nearby rooms in the casino to fill the remaining empty tables. All three shows were presented by actor Nunzio Filogamo, and the twenty competing songs were performed by the singers Nilla Pizzi, Achille Togliani and Duo Fasano with musical accompaniment from the Della canzone orchestra.

=== First night ===
The first night was held on 29 January 1951, beginning at 22:00 CET.

Qualifier

First night – 29 January 1951
R/O	Song	Artist	Result
1	"Sorrentinella"	Duo Fasano	—N/a
2	"Mai più"	Achille Togliani	—N/a
3	"La luna si veste d'argento"	Nilla Pizzi and Achille Togliani	Qualified
4	"La margherita"	Nilla Pizzi and Duo Fasano	Qualified
5	"Tutto è finito"	Nilla Pizzi	—N/a
6	"Sei fatta per me"	Achille Togliani and Duo Fasano	—N/a
7	"È l'alba"	Nilla Pizzi	—N/a
8	"La cicogna distratta"	Duo Fasano	Qualified
9	"Eco fra gli abeti"	Nilla Pizzi and Achille Togliani	Qualified
10	"Al mercato di Pizzighettone"	Achille Togliani and Duo Fasano	Qualified

=== Second night ===
The second night was held on 30 January 1951, beginning at 22:00 CET.

Qualifier

Second night – 30 January 1951
R/O	Song	Artist	Result
1	"Serenata a nessuno"	Achille Togliani	Qualified
2	"Oro di Napoli"	Duo Fasano	—N/a
3	"Notte di Sanremo"	Nilla Pizzi	—N/a
4	"Famme durmì"	Achille Togliani and Duo Fasano	Qualified
5	"Ho pianto (una volta sola)"	Nilla Pizzi	—N/a
6	"Sotto il mandorlo"	Duo Fasano	Qualified
7	"Sedici anni"	Achille Togliani	Qualified
8	"Mia cara Napoli"	Nilla Pizzi	—N/a
9	"Mani che si cercano"	Achille Togliani	—N/a
10	"Grazie dei fiori"	Nilla Pizzi	Qualified

=== Final night ===
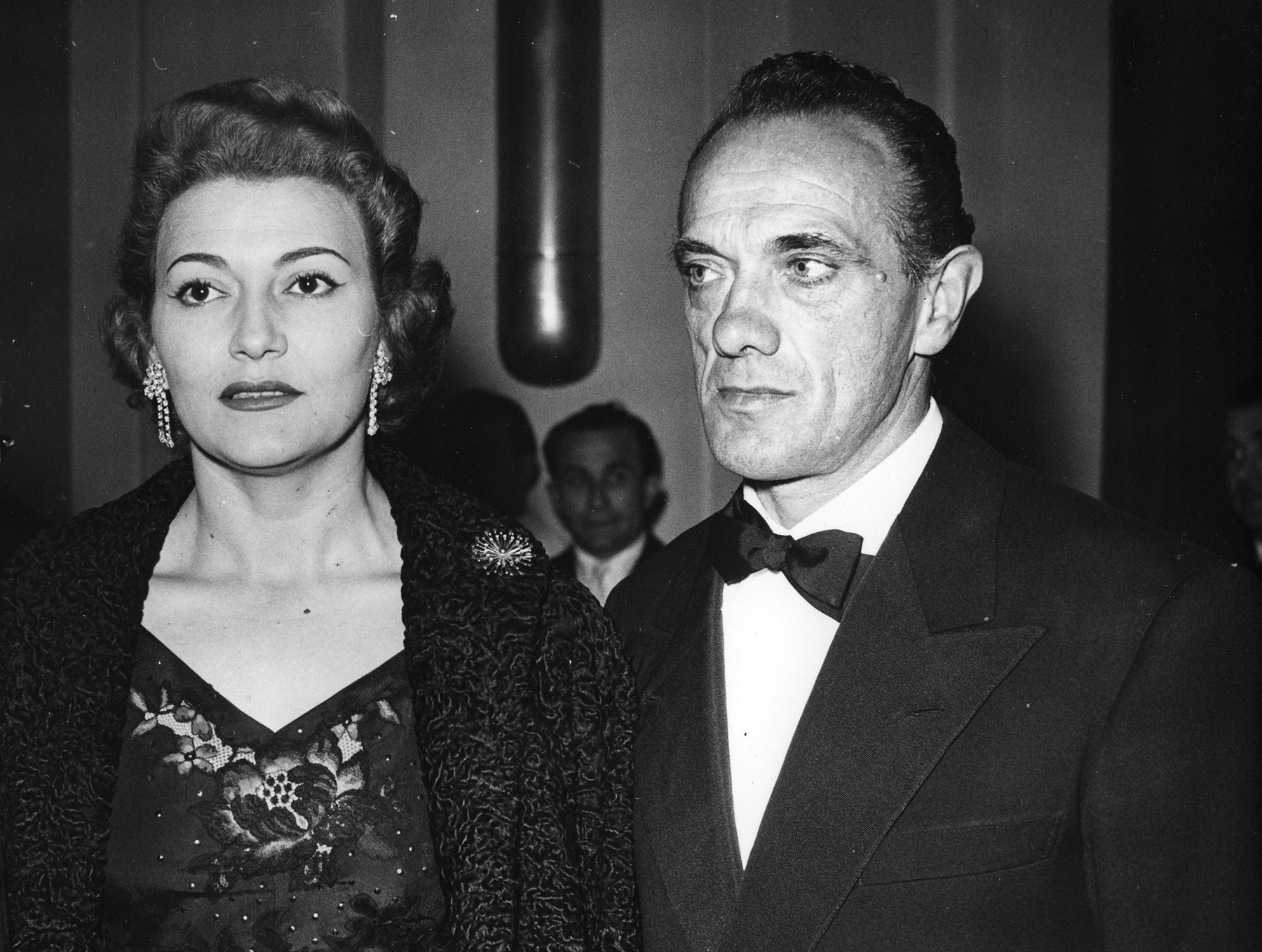
Nilla Pizzi with writer Mario Panzeri after the awards ceremony

The final night was held on 31 January 1951, beginning at 22:00 CET.

A seven-member committee was responsible for counting the final audience vote. It was chaired by the Sanremo Casino's concessionaire Pier Busseti, who presented awards to the songwriters of the top three songs on stage. The winning song was "Grazie dei fiori", composed by Saverio Seracini, written by Gian Carlo Testoni and Mario Panzeri, and performed by Nilla Pizzi. In second place was "La luna si veste d'argento" composed by Vittorio Mascheroni, written by Biri, and performed as a duet by Nilla Pizzi and Achille Togliani. In third place was "Serenata a nessuno" written and composed by Walter Colì, performed by Achille Togliani.

The festival received little attention from Italian media, with few journalists in attendance and newspapers offering it minimal coverage. Nevertheless, the event was seen as a success after it took place. Records of the competing songs were reported to be in high demand with the public, and were commercially released two weeks after the festival's conclusion, eventually selling a total of 70,000 copies. The winning song, "Grazie dei fiori", went on to sell 36,000 copies alone.

Winner

Final night – 31 January 1951
Song	Artist	Place
"Al mercato di Pizzighettone"	Achille Togliani and Duo Fasano	—N/a
"Eco fra gli abeti"	Nilla Pizzi and Achille Togliani	—N/a
"Famme durmì"	Achille Togliani and Duo Fasano	—N/a
"Grazie dei fiori"	Nilla Pizzi	1
"La cicogna distratta"	Duo Fasano	—N/a
"La luna si veste d'argento"	Nilla Pizzi and Achille Togliani	2
"La margherita"	Nilla Pizzi and Duo Fasano	—N/a
"Sedici anni"	Achille Togliani	—N/a
"Serenata a nessuno"	Achille Togliani	3
"Sotto il mandorlo"	Duo Fasano	—N/a

== Broadcast ==
All three nights were broadcast on RAI's second radio station, Rete Rossa. The first broadcasts for each night began at 22:00 CET, lasting forty-five minutes. The second broadcasts began at 23:30 CET, lasting thirty minutes. Radio Monte-Carlo also broadcast the last fifteen minutes of the final night.
