= Nilla Pizzi =

Italian singer

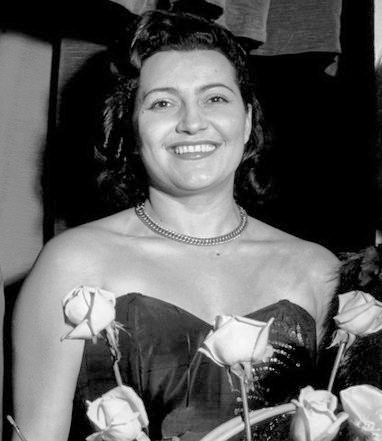
- Pizzi upon winning the Sanremo Music Festival 1952

Background information
- Born: Adionilla Pizzi; 16 April 1919; Sant'Agata Bolognese, Emilia-Romagna, Kingdom of Italy
- Died: 12 March 2011 (aged 91) Segrate, Lombardy, Italy
- Genres: Pop; jazz
- Occupations: Singer; actress
- Years active: 1940–2011
- Labels: Italdisc; EMI; Ricordi; Columbia; Cetra; RCA Italiana; Équipe

Adionilla "Nilla" Pizzi (Italian: [(adjo)ˈnilla ˈpittsi]; 16 April 1919 – 12 March 2011) was an Italian singer and actress.

She was particularly famous in Italy during the 1950s and 1960s. She is well known for winning the first edition of the Sanremo Music Festival in 1951, singing "Grazie dei fiori". In addition, the following year (1952), she finished first, second, and third with "Vola colomba", "Papaveri e papere", and "Una donna prega" respectively; a presently unbeaten record.

Through her Sanremo performance career, she presented a total of thirty-one songs, as well as participating three more times as a guest and once as a presenter.

== Life and career ==
=== Early life and career beginnings ===
Born in Sant'Agata Bolognese, near Bologna, Adionilla Pizzi was the daughter of Angelo, a farmer also responsible for municipal road maintenance, and Maria, a tailor and seamstress. She had two younger sisters.

She was first employed in tailoring, then at the military bakery in Casaralta (a borough of Bologna), and finally as a radio tester at Ducati, also in Bologna. Pizzi's career started in the field of beauty reviews that, at the end of the 1930s, began to make their appearance. On 4 November 1938, at the age of 19, she participated in a show for the soldiers of the 59th Infantry Regiment of Bologna, as a feast for the Italian Armed Forces. In 1939 she participated in the Miss Italia contest.

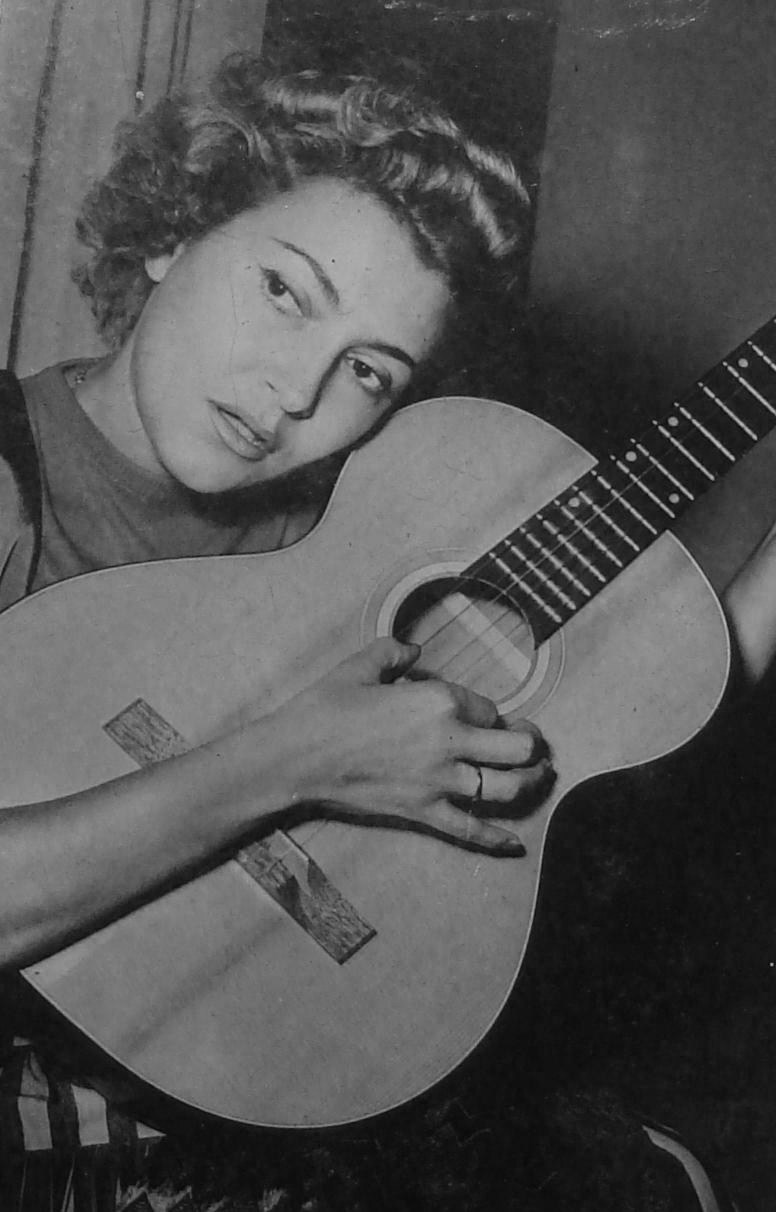
Nilla Pizzi in 1939

In 1940, she performed in other shows organised for the Armed Forces, even being elected mascot of the 35th Infantry Regiment of Bologna. In 1942, she won a competition for new voices organized by EIAR, the Italian radio broadcaster, in front of ten thousand competitors, where she interpreted the songs "Tu musica divina" by Alberto Rabagliati, and "Domani non mi aspettar" by Oscar Carboni. She then began performing with the orchestra Zeme, debuting on the radio the same year, performing the tune "Casetta tra le rose", composed by Guido Cergoli.

Her first album for Parlophon was recorded on 20 February 1944, duetting with Bruna Rattani in "Valzer di primavera" and accompanying Elsa Peyrone in "Ronda solitaria". On 23 February, her first solo song "Alba della vita" was released. However, Pizzi always denied this, claiming it was a Parlophon mistake on the label. Either way, she was removed from the radio after a negative judgment handed down by the maestro Tito Petralia in the spring of 1944, as her voice was allegedly considered too sensual and exotic for the Fascist regime. However, she continued to tour the theatres and ballrooms of all Italy in 1945 and 1946, following the orchestra of maestro Cinico Angelini, to whom she had romantically linked. Her permanent return to radio occurred in 1946, when she signed a recording contract that tied her to Cetra. However, she was reportedly forced to record using aliases, with some records being released without any mention (i.e. anonymously). By 1949, Pizzi was finally allowed to return to recording using only her own name. Despite the aliases and anonymity, she had still become very popular, gathering wide acclaim by launching many popular songs.

The period from 1948 to 1950 changed the trends and tastes of the public, due to the affirmation of the Latin American style imposed through Hollywood by Xavier Cugat and Carmen Miranda, and then spread in Italy songs to the rhythm of samba, rumba, bayon, calypso and cha cha cha. However, Nilla Pizzi was also able to juggle her signature cheerful songs thanks to ironic interpretations. She also performed duets with her colleague Luciano Benevene, with songs like "Bongo Bongo Bongo", "Che si fa con le fanciulle?" and "Avanti e indré".

=== 1950s ===
The 1950s saw her become the singer of many successful songs, such as "Che bel fiulin", written for her by a certain Casasco. In 1951 she won the first Sanremo Music Festival with "Grazie dei fiori", also finishing second with "La luna si veste d'argento", sung in duet with Achille Togliani. "Grazie dei fiori" would go on to sell 36,000 copies, a massive success for the era. In the same year, the Italian version of the hit "Cherry Pink (and Apple Blossom White)", titled "Ciliegi rosa", was quite successful.

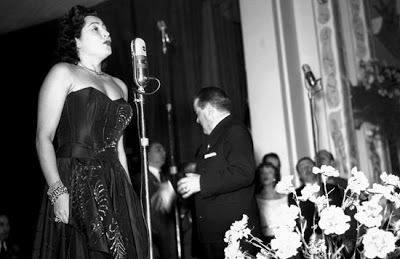
Nilla Pizzi performing in Sanremo 1952

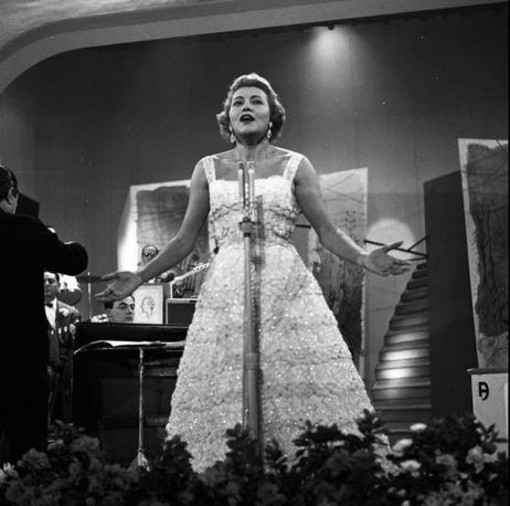
Nilla Pizzi performing as a guest during the 1956 edition

The following year she triumphed again at the Sanremo Festival conquering the entire podium (first, second and third place) respectively with "Vola colomba", "Papaveri e papere", and "Una donna prega", which remains a record to this day never equaled by any other singer (since 1967, every entrant in the event must perform only one competing song). She was dubbed "the Queen of Italian Music" and her songs are deemed to have marked an era: "Vola colomba" accompanied the return of Trieste to Italy while "Papaveri e papere" sold 75,000 copies, was translated into over forty languages and became a classic of Italian music (with a version also being recorded by the famous tenor Beniamino Gigli), despite the original lyrics having been censored due to overt political allusions. In 1952, Pizzi won the first edition of the Festival di Napoli alongside Franco Ricci, singing "Desiderio 'e sole". She also won third place with "Margellina", sung in conjunction with Sergio Bruni. At the Sanremo Festival 1953, she placed second with "Campanaro" presented in pairs with Teddy Reno. Immediately, however, she drew on other recordings that confirmed her success.

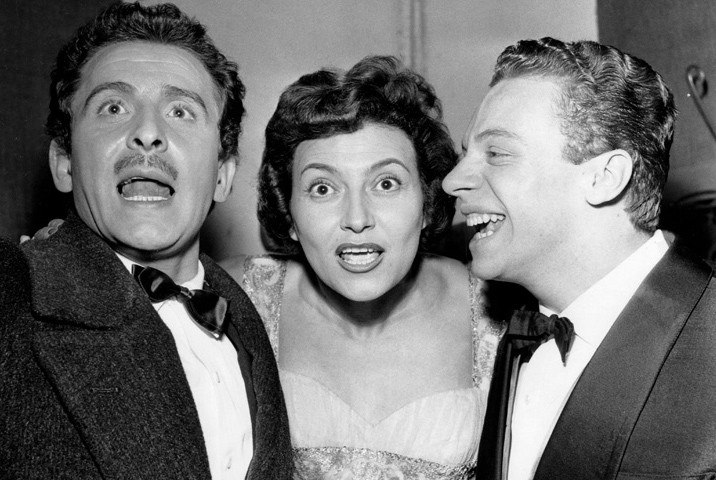
Nilla Pizzi with Domenico Modugno and Johnny Dorelli at the 1958 edition of Sanremo

She then successfully toured America, participating in radio and television broadcasts, recording records, and triumphing with the song "Croce di oro". In 1957, she won the Festival di Velletri with "Dicembre m'ha portato una canzone" paired with Nunzio Gallo; in parallel, she triumphed at the Sicilian Song Festival with the song "Sicilia bedda". She also embarked on a tour of Russia with Paolo Bacilieri, from which she brought to Italy the songs "Kira" and "Podmoskovnyye vechera" ("Midnight in Moscow"), recorded with the Roman New Orleans Jazz Band of Carlo Loffredo. In the same year, she starred on the RAI National Program (precursor to Rai 1), directed by Antonello Falqui, where invited designers, actresses and other prominent female characters became forerunners of modern talk shows. In the same year she took part in two series of the television advertising column Carosello. In 1958, she returned to the Sanremo Festival where she placed second and third with "L'edera" and "Amare un altro", with Tonina Torrielli and Gino Latilla respectively. A few months later she won the 1958 edition of Canzonissima with "L'edera". In 1959 she won the Barcelona Festival (over Claudio Villa presenting "Binario"), and the Critics' Prize of that year's Sanremo Festival with "Adorami". She placed third at the Festival di Napoli with "Vieneme 'nzuonno" alongside Sergio Bruni.

=== 1960s–1980s ===
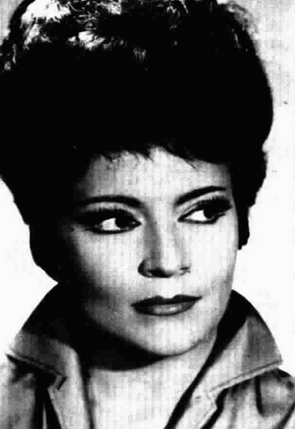
Nilla Pizzi in 1964

In 1960, she returned to the Sanremo Festival and entered the song "Colpevole" in a couple with Tonina Torrielli, ranking fourth, whilst her other entry "Perdoniamoci" was eliminated before the final. Starting from this period, the contrast between the ever-growing rock and roll and beat and Pizzi's traditional melodic song caused her to be set aside by record companies. Although she could no longer achieve the same success in Italy as in previous decades, the singer was still able to carve her own place in the music scene, both in Italy and internationally, under the auspices of her new label, the RCA Italiana, in the "revival-nostalgic" and "folkloristic" vein of music. She kept recording songs in different regional languages, and also participated very often as a guest in various television and radio broadcasts.

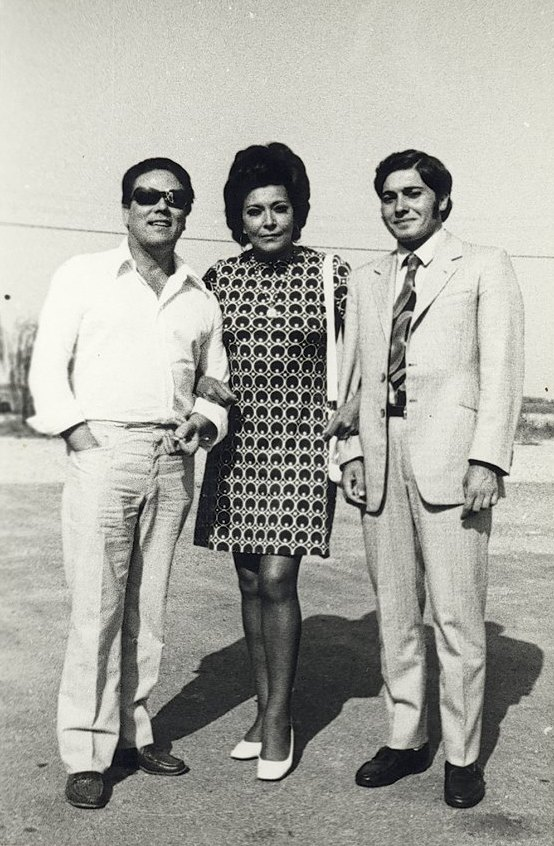
Nilla Pizzi with Giacomo Romano Davare (right) and Redento Coslovi in 1974

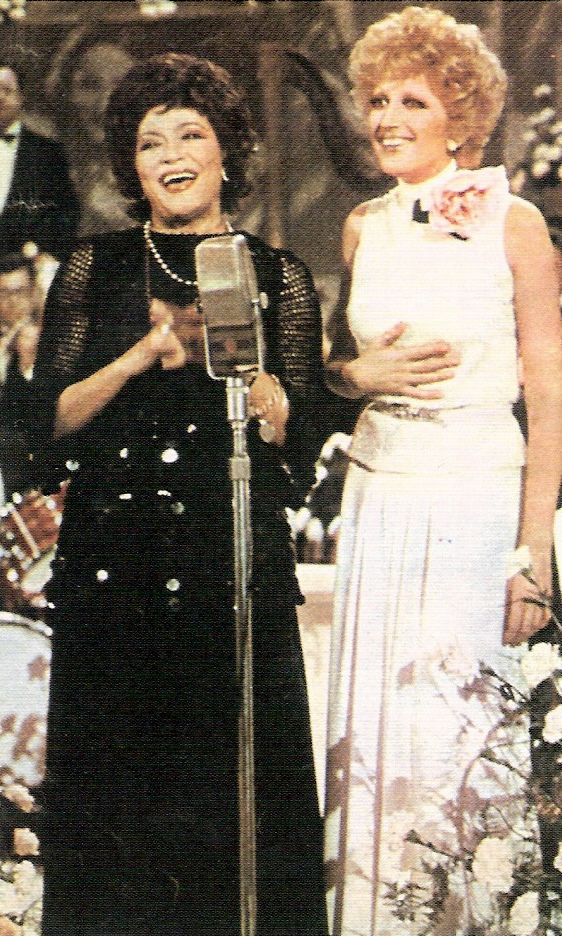
Pizzi hosted by Mina on the show Milleluci, 1974

She opened a nightclub in Acapulco paying homage to Fred Buscaglione, who had died prematurely and tragically shortly before. The club was reportedly attended by other big names such as Frank Sinatra, Sammy Davis Junior, Curd Jürgens, and Caterina Valente. In June 1961, she participated in the Giugno della Canzone Napoletana. In 1962 she performed at the first Cantagiro singing "Un mondo per noi", but did not reach the final. In the same year she embarked on the first of a thirty-year series of successful tours in Australia, where she also appeared on local TV. In 1964 she was among the 42 participants of the first edition of Un disco per l'estate, with the song "Abbronziamoci insieme", but she failed to reach the final. In the same year she participated in the television parody of The Three Musketeers for the variety show Biblioteca di Studio Uno, directed by Antonello Falqui and set up by the Quartetto Cetra, playing Queen Anne of Austria, alongside Claudio Villa who played King Louis XIII. She then received the prestigious Grande Cervo d'Oro award from the Libyan government and in 1965 she won the Sandrigo Festival, in the province of Vicenza, with the Venetian-language song "Ti, te se timido". In the same year she returned to work as an actress: directed by Alberto Lattuada she played Sostrata in the film adaptation of Machiavelli's The Mandrake, alongside Totò, Romolo Valli, Rosanna Schiaffino and Philippe Leroy.

Another successful tour of the United States took place in 1968, during which she performed alongside Frank Sinatra, Ella Fitzgerald, Perry Como and Rosemary Clooney. In 1970, she recorded the album Scritte per me, with twelve tracks by the greatest Italian authors and composers of the period such as Pino Calvi, Carlo Donida, Bruno Pallesi, Leo Chiosso, Carlo Alberto Rossi, the writer Leonida Repaci, as well as television presenters Pippo Baudo and Paolo Limiti. The album marked the transition to her new record label, Équipe. In 1972 her album Con tanta nostalgia won the Discographic Critics' Prize, a then very coveted award. In 1978 she participated as an actress in her last film: Melodrammore, the only film directed by Maurizio Costanzo. In 1981 Gianni Ravera called her to present the Sanremo Festival, alongside Claudio Cecchetto and Eleonora Vallone; Pizzi was the official madrina ("godmother") of the event on the thirtieth anniversary of the first edition. From 1986 to 1990 she formed, together with Carla Boni, Gino Latilla and Giorgio Consolini, the group Quelli di Sanremo ("The ones from Sanremo"), with which she performed in numerous events. In the television season from 1986 to 1987 she hosted the program L'allegro giovedì on the local Milanese television, which had the theme song "Un giorno all'italiana". From 1988 to 1992 she was the host of another local television variety broadcast by a Romagnol television station, entitled Romagna mia. In 1989 she participated in C'era una volta il Festival with "Grazie dei fiori", in which, although not entering the final, she was given a plaque-prize, awarded by a commission, where "Grazie dei fiori" was recognized as the most beautiful song of the first 40 years of the Sanremo Festival.

== Personal life ==
On 24 September 1940, she married Guido Pizzi, a young construction worker to whom she was not related despite bearing the same surname. A few days after the wedding, her husband was recalled to the army and the couple separated.

In 1957, she secretly married in Acapulco the guitarist Carlo Porti, from whom she separated a few months later.

== Death ==
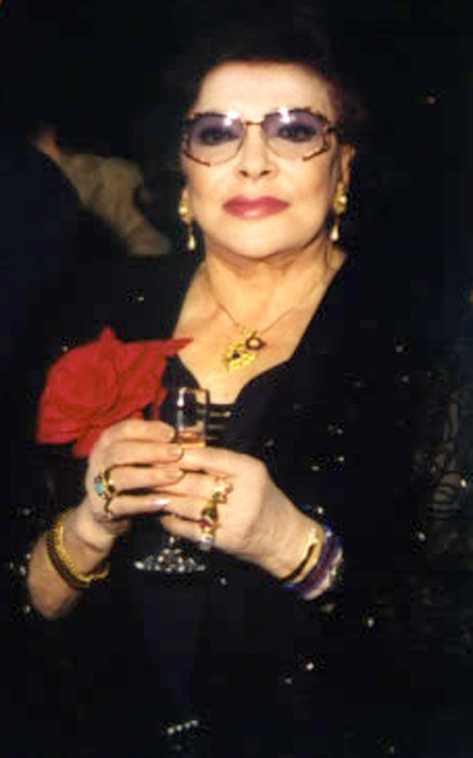
Pizzi in the 2000s

On the morning of 12 March 2011, Pizzi died, aged 91, at the Capitanio nursing home in Segrate, Milan, where she was admitted following an operation. On the 16th of March 2011, her ashes were buried in the family chapel in the cemetery of Sant'Agata Bolognese, where the bodies of her parents rest.

== Sanremo participations ==
- 1951
  - "Grazie dei fiori" – 1st
  - "La luna si veste d'argento" (with Achille Togliani) – 2nd
  - "Eco tra gli abeti" (with Achille Togliani) – 5th
  - "La margherita" (with Duo Fasano) – 8th
  - "È l'alba" – Failed to qualify for the final
  - "Ho pianto una volta sola" – Failed to qualify for the final
  - "Mia cara Napoli" – Failed to qualify for the final
  - "Notte di Sanremo" – Failed to qualify for the final
  - "Tutto è finito" – Failed to qualify for the final
- 1952
  - "Vola colomba" – 1st
  - "Papaveri e papere" – 2nd
  - "Una donna prega" – 3rd
  - "Nel regno dei sogni" – 10th
  - "Buonanotte ai bimbi del mondo" (with Duo Fasano) – Failed to qualify for the final
  - "Il valzer di Nonna Speranza" (with Duo Fasano) – Failed to qualify for the final
  - "Ninna nanna dei sogni perduti" – Failed to qualify for the final
- 1953 (Note: In these editions, each competing song was performed by two different singers (or sets of singers) separately. The other performers are given in parentheses.)
  - "Campanaro" (paired with Teddy Reno) – 2nd
  - "Sussurrando buonanotte" (paired with Teddy Reno) – 8th
  - "Papà pacifico" (paired with Teddy Reno) – 10th
  - "Canto della solitudine" (paired with Teddy Reno) – Failed to qualify for the final
  - "L'altra" (paired with Flo Sandon's) – Failed to qualify for the final
- 1958
  - "L'edera" (paired with Tonina Torrielli) – 2nd
  - "Amare un'altra" (paired with Gino Latilla) – 3rd
  - "Giuro d'amarti così" (paired with Claudio Villa) – 5th
  - "La canzone che piace a te" (with Aurelio Fierro; paired with Claudio Villa and Duo Fasano) – Failed to qualify for the final
- 1959
  - "Sempre con te" (paired with Fausto Cigliano) – 6th
  - "Adorami" (paired with Tonina Torrielli) – Failed to qualify for the final
  - "Il nostro refrain" (paired with Tonina Torrielli) – Failed to qualify for the final
- 1960
  - "Colpevole" (paired with Tonina Torrielli) – 4th
  - "Perdoniamoci" (paired with Achille Togliani) – Failed to qualify for the final
- 1981: presenter with Claudio Cecchetto and Eleonora Vallone
- 1994: "Una vecchia canzone italiana" (as a member of Squadra Italia) – 19th
- 2000: special guest; awarded a prize by presenters Fabio Fazio and Luciano Pavarotti for the 50 years since her first victory
- 2003: special guest; awarded the City of Sanremo Prize
- 2010: special guest; awarded the City of Sanremo Prize for a second time

== Sources ==
- Giannelli, Enzo (2019). Nilla ultima regina. La vita e la carriera di Nilla Pizzi (in Italian). Sacco.
- Pozzi, Italo; Musi, Giuliano (2017). Nilla Pizzi: storia di un sogno (in Italian). Minerva.
