= Lazzarella (film) =

- Directed by: Carlo Ludovico Bragaglia
- Screenplay by: Riccardo Pazzaglia; Giorgio Prosperi; Ugo Guerra
- Story by: Riccardo Pazzaglia
- Starring: Alessandra Panaro; Terence Hill
- Cinematography: Raffaele Masciocchi
- Edited by: Mario Serandrei
- Music by: Carlo Rustichelli
- Distributed by: Titanus
- Release date: 1957
- Language: Italian

Lazzarella is a 1957 Italian comedy film directed by Carlo Ludovico Bragaglia and starring Alessandra Panaro and Mario Girotti (later best known as Terence Hill). It is loosely inspired by the lyrics of the song "Lazzarella" by Riccardo Pazzaglia and Domenico Modugno, with the same Pazzaglia serving as a screenwriter. The film was a box office success, being the tenth most viewed film in the 1957/58 season in Italy.

== Plot ==
Luciano, who studies at the university, falls in love with Sandra, a high school student, who reciprocates his love. If her family is very rich, his is of modest extraction; the difference in conditions does not seem to be a problem, however, and Luciano's degree increases the hope of a happy future. Following a sudden financial crisis, however, Sandra's family business goes bankrupt: so, to come to the aid of her parents, the girl accepts the care of a very rich childhood friend, deciding to marry him to get his financial support. Luciano, not aware of the girl's motives, will leave her in a bad way. But Lazzarella's feelings will prevail and in the end he will find his love again.

== Production ==
The film is inspired by the song of the same name sung by Aurelio Fierro and winner of the second prize at the Naples Festival in 1957. Written by Domenico Modugno and Riccardo Pazzaglia, the song had already been a huge success and had also been translated into French and performed by Dalida.

== Cast ==
- Alessandra Panaro as Sandra de Luca aka Lazzarella
- Mario Girotti as Luciano Prisco
- Rossella Como as Fanny
- Luigi De Filippo as Baron Nicola Sant'Elmo
- Domenico Modugno as Mimì
- Irène Tunc as Brigitte Clermont
- Tina Pica as Widow Capuana
- Dolores Palumbo as Donna Carmela
- Aurelio Fierro as Aurelio
- Madeleine Fischer as Sandra's mother
- Riccardo Garrone as Sandra's father
- Turi Pandolfini as Professor Avallone
- Mario Ambrosino as Scognamiglio
- Roy Ciccolini as Fernando
