= Sorelle Marinetti =

Italian swing singer

Le sorelle Marinetti
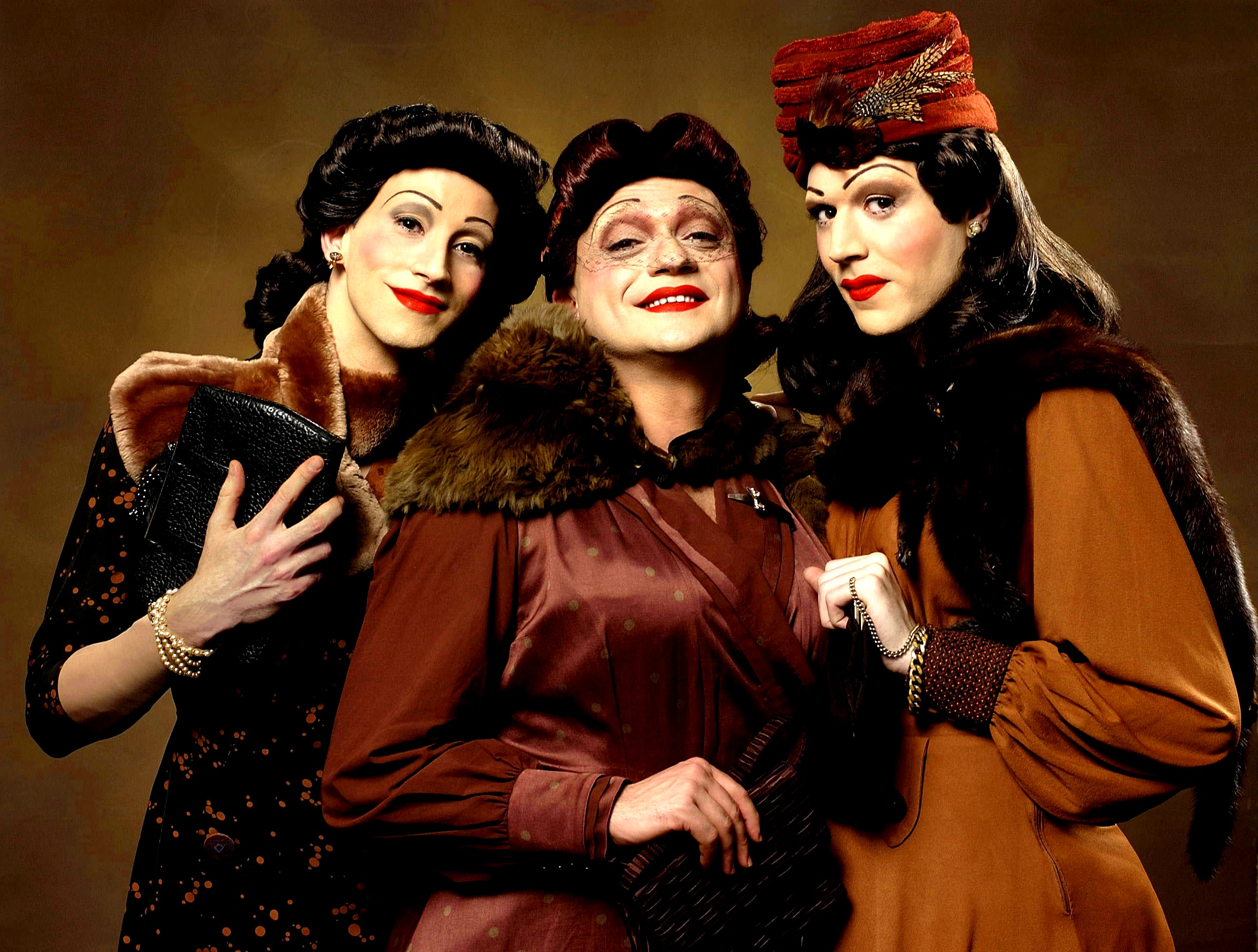
- Le sorelle Marinetti

Background information
- Origin: Italy
- Genres: Swing, travesty
- Years active: 2006 to present
- Members: Turbina: Nicola Olivieri; Elica: Matteo Minerva; Scintilla: Marco Lugli
- Website: www.lesorellemarinetti.it

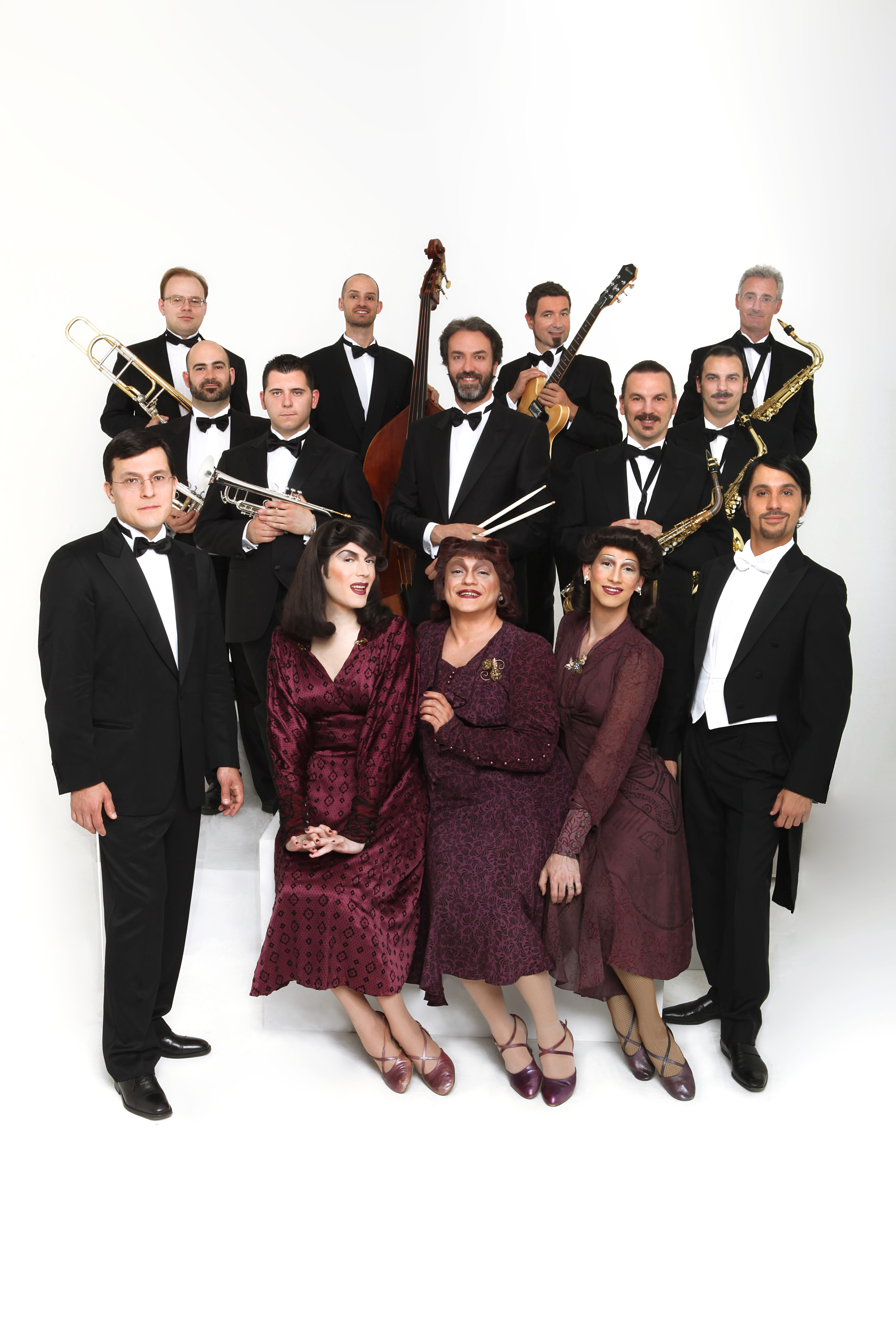
The band together with the Orchestra Maniscalchi

Sorelle Marinetti (the Marinetti sisters) is the name of an Italian swing singer trio starring three males singers in travesti fashion. Their names are Turbina, Elica and Scintilla Marinetti (respectively Nicola Olivieri, Matteo Minerva and Marco Lugli). In October 2015 Matteo Minerva replaced Andrea Allione, one of the original members of the trio, known to the public as "Mercuria".

== Background and style ==
The band names and the pseudonyms of the singers refers to futurism and its founder, Filippo Tommaso Marinetti. The band uses Swing elements of the 1930s and musical ideas from Giovanni D’Anzi, like the Boswell Sisters, the Trio Lescano and the Puppini Sisters.

Producer Giorgio Bozzo started casting members for the groups in 2006. The first CD Non ce ne importa niente was published in 2008. 2010 the band published another CD called Signorine novecento. The Orchestra Maniscalchi, a swingband produced by Bozzo, is often playing together with the sorelle.

== Appearances ==
Some TV gigs took place with Maurizio Costanzo, of SKY Vivo, in the Maurizio Costanzo Show and as well together with Piero Chiambretti, The sorelle went on stage at the Sanremo Music Festival 2010 together with vocalist Arisa. 2010 Pippo Baudos comparison of the sorelle with Sorelle Bandiera lead to a smaller scandal in Italy, since the singers disagreed to participate in Baudilfos show afterwards.

Gianni Fantoni and Giorgio Bozzo produced a musical about a swing group (the sorelle) in the time of the Allied invasion of Italy 1943. The piece called Risate sotto le bombe laughter under the bombs, was brought on stage in Milan 2013.
