= Poppa Piccolino =

Single by Diana Decker
- B-side: "If I Had a Golden Umbrella"
- Released: 1953
- Genre: Traditional pop
- Length: 2:48
- Label: Columbia
- Composer: Vittorio Mascheroni
- Lyricist: Robert Musel

"Poppa Piccolino" was a song recorded by Diana Decker which reached number 2 on the UK singles chart in December 1953. It was the only UK hit single for this British-based American-born singer and actress. It was later also recorded by Petula Clark, Mantovani and David Whitfield (with the first verse of "Funiculì, Funiculà").

The original 1952 Italian lyrics had the title "Papaveri e papere" (translating to "Poppies and Goslings") and were written by Mario Panzeri and Giuseppe Rastelli with music by Vittorio Mascheroni. The cheerful lyrics hide a political satire about inequalities between rich ("poppies") and poor ("goslings"). The song was an Italian hit for singer Nilla Pizzi, who came in second place with it at the Sanremo Music Festival 1952. It went on to be a worldwide hit, has been translated into forty languages, and inspired the title of a movie with Walter Chiari.

English lyrics were by Bob Musel and the song was published by Chappell's of London. The lyrics lose the original meaning, changing the piece into a song about a wandering musician. They tell the story of a much loved Italian concertina-playing vagabond who wanders from town to town with a monkey who collects money from the audience. One day he loses his concertina and becomes very sad. His little monkey finds it and joy is restored to all.
