= Pino Calvi =

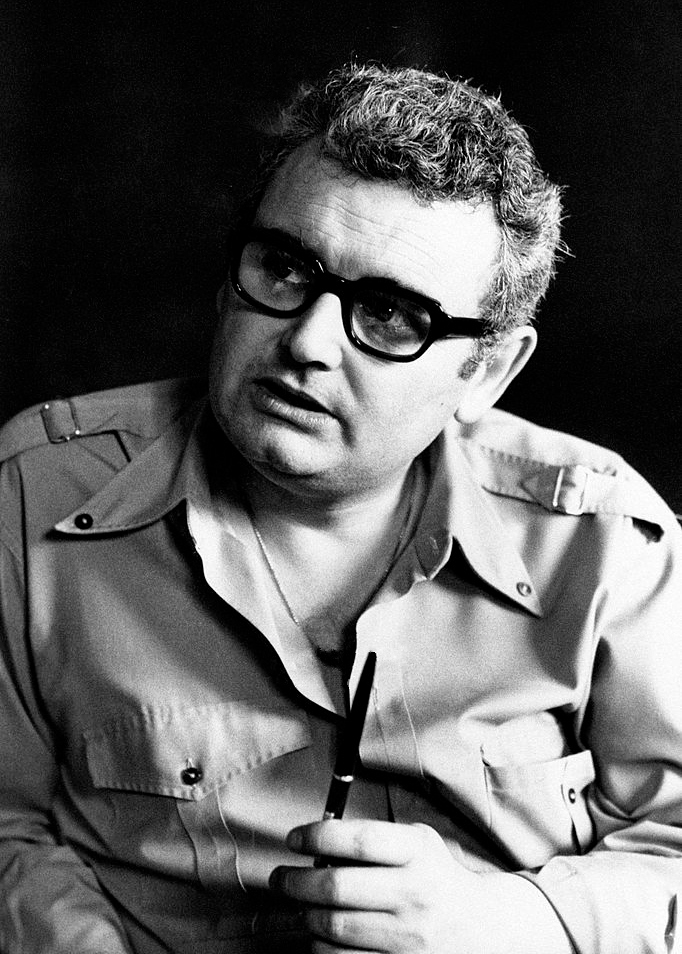
- Pino Calvi in 1970

Background information
- Born: 12 January 1930
- Origin: Voghera, Italy
- Died: 4 January 1989 (aged 58)
- Occupations: Songwriter, composer, arranger, instrumentalist
- Instrument: Piano
- Years active: 1961–1983
- Website: http://www.pinopresti.eu

Pino Calvi (12 January 1930 – 4 January 1989) was an Italian pianist, arranger, conductor and soundtrack composer for TV series and films, which included Tunis Top Secret (1959), Crimen (1960) and The Revengers (1972).

His song "Accarezzame" was performed by famous Italian artists such as, among others, Roberto Murolo, Ornella Vanoni, Peppino Di Capri, Achille Togliani, Teddy Reno, Fred Bongusto, Gigliola Cinquetti, Paolo Fresu.

He became popular in the 1970s for his participation in some RAI TV programs, such as Senza Rete in Naples, when he was a polite Maestro.

Calvi died in Palazzina di Castana, Pavia in 1989.

== Gallery ==
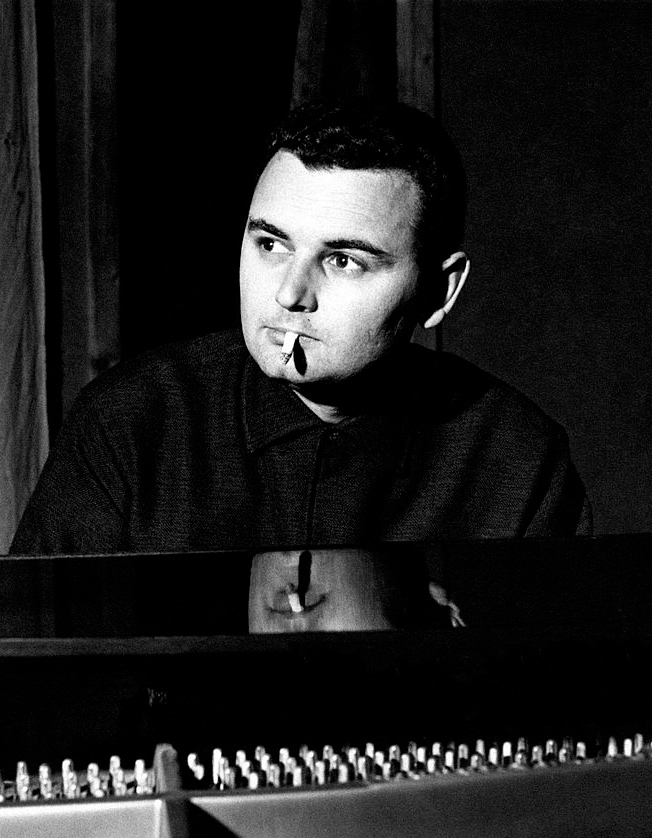
Pino Calvi in 1959

== Bibliography ==
- Lorenzo Nosvelli – Angelo Vicini: Pino Calvi – Il sogno e la musica – Edo edizioni Oltrepò – 2003
