= Nunzio Filogamo =

Italian television and radio presenter, actor and singer (1902 – 2002)

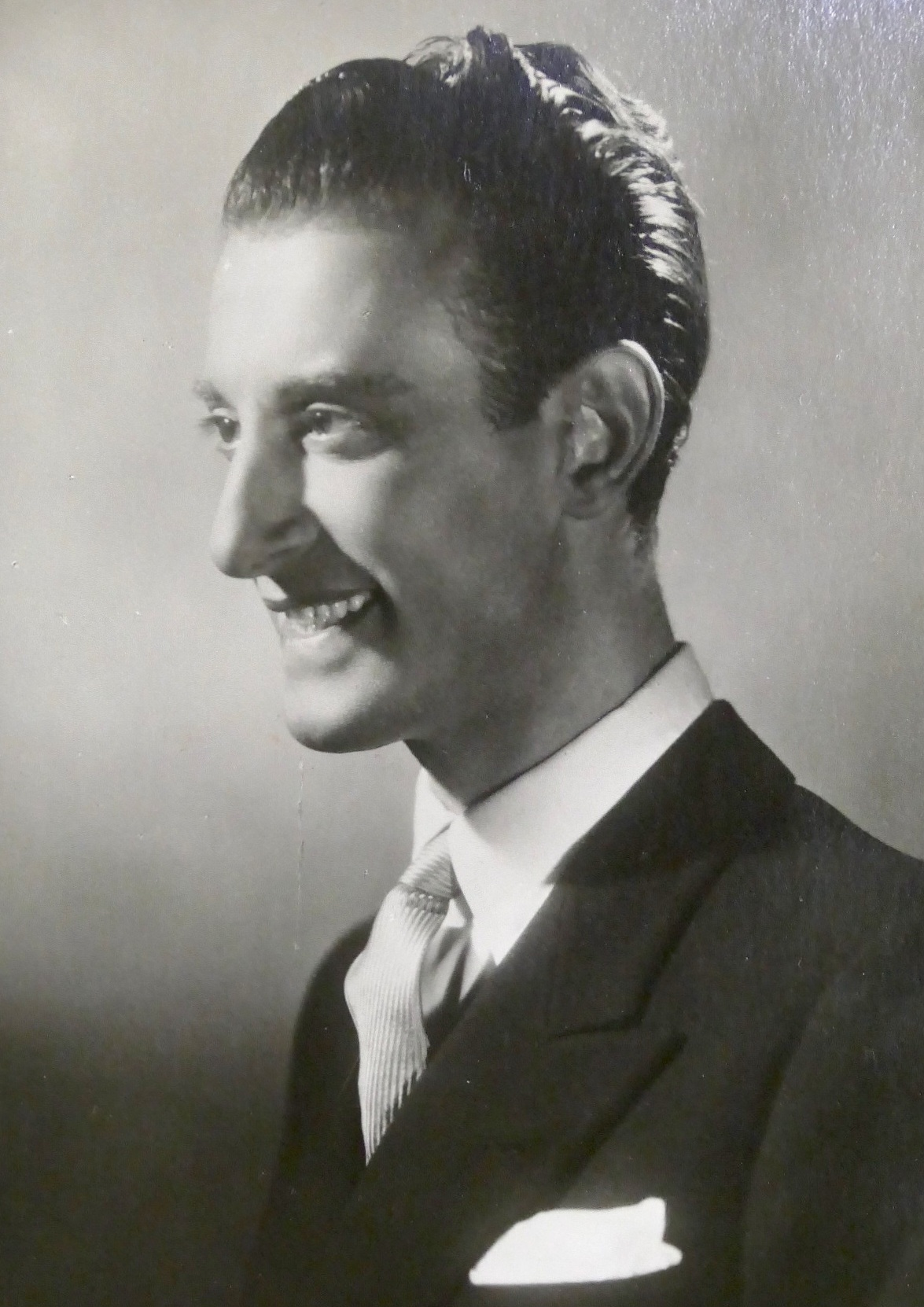
- Filogamo in 1942
- Born: 20 February 1902; Palermo, Sicily, Kingdom of Italy
- Died: 24 January 2002 (aged 99); Rodello d'Alba, Piedmont, Italy
- Occupations: Television presenter; radio presenter; actor; singer

Nunzio Filogamo (Italian pronunciation: [ˈnuntsjo fiˈlɔːɡamo]; 20 September 1902 – 24 January 2002) was an Italian television and radio presenter, actor and singer.

== Life and career ==
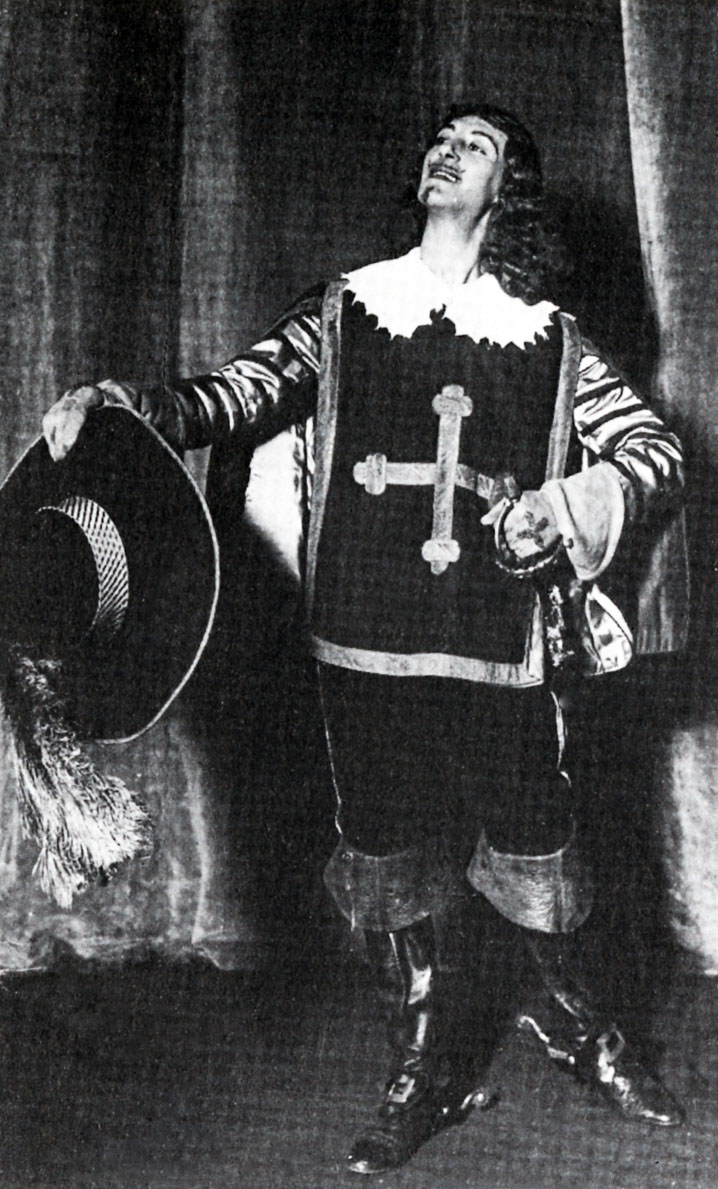
Filogamo portraying the character of Aramis, 1934

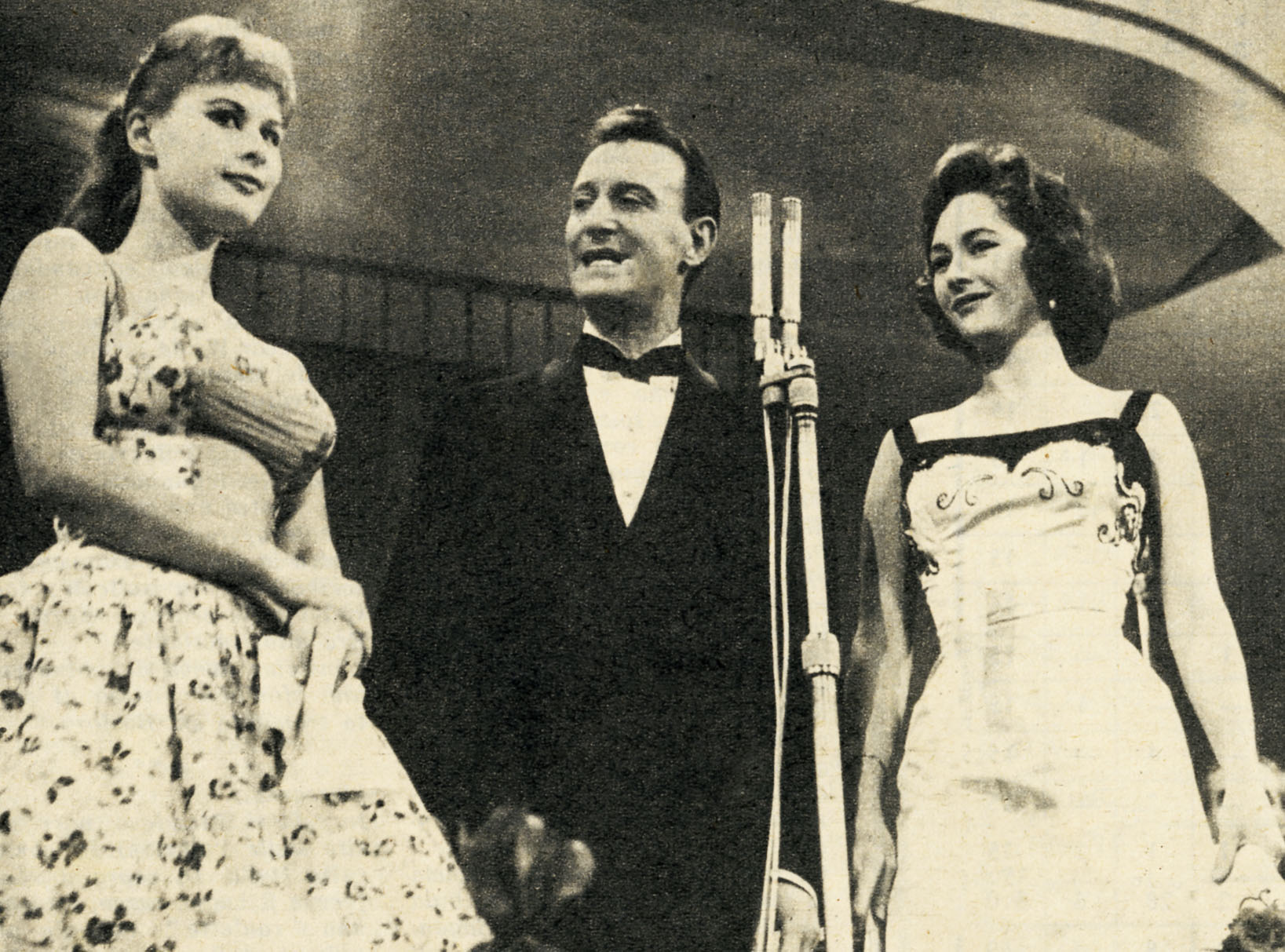
Filogamo between Marisa Allasio (left) and Fiorella Mari (right) at the Sanremo Music Festival 1957

Born in Palermo, Filogamo moved to Turin at a young age, then he studied law at the Sorbonne University and at the Turin University, where he graduated.

After working for two years as a lawyer, he started a career as a stage actor, entering the companies of Dina Galli and Irma and Emma Gramatica. In 1934 he debuted as a radio actor in the variety show I quattro moschettieri, which lasted four years and gave him a large popularity.

After the outbreak of war, Filogamo was hired to host several variety events for soldiers and wounded people; later, he continued to work as a presenter of the shows reserved for the Allied forces which were held at the Teatro dell'Opera in Rome.

Filogamo's fame is mainly linked to the Sanremo Music Festival, of which he hosted five editions including the first ever in 1951. During the second edition of the Festival he coined the famous slogan "Dear friends, near and far, good evening. Good evening wherever you are", which soon became his trademark.

After hosting several television and radio programs, he retired in the 1970s. During his career Filogamo was also an occasional film actor and a singer; among his best-known songs, "Tutto va bene madama la marchesa" and "Povero cagnolino pechinese".

He died, about a month before turning 100, in a retirement home in Rodello d'Alba, in the Province of Cuneo.

== Filmography ==
Year	Title	Role	Notes
1933	Non c'è bisogno di denaro		
1935	Il serpente a sonagli	Il maestro di balla	
1937	The Countess of Parma	Conte di Sebasta	
1940	Ecco la radio!		
1940	Una famiglia impossibile		
1943	C'è sempre un ma!		
1943	La vita torna	Cortese, Il regista	
1947	Les beaux jours du roi Murat		Uncredited
1948	How I Lost the War	Il venditore di cappelli	
1949	Adam and Eve	Il naufrago francese	
1949	Il vedovo allegro		
1949	How I Discovered America	Il prete	
1951	Miracolo a Viggiù		
1951	The Two Sergeants		
1951	Il microfono è vostro		
1963	Urlo contro melodia nel Cantagiro '63		
1964	La guerra dei topless		
