= Louiselle =

Italian singer (1946–2024)

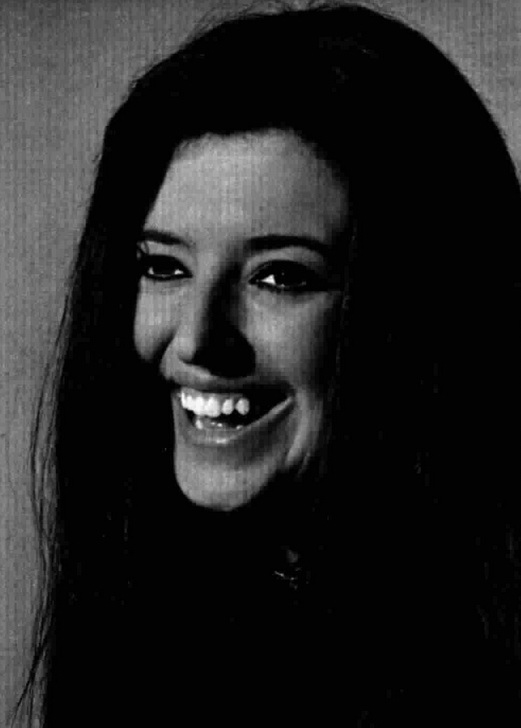
Louiselle (1968)

Maria Luisa Catricalà (8 November 1946 – 27 April 2024), best known by the stage name Louiselle, was an Italian singer of the 1960s and '70s. Born in Vibo Valentia, Louiselle started her career in 1961, and in 1965, she got her first success with "Ascoltami", a song she and Dalida were supposed to perform at the Sanremo Music Festival until their record label RCA withdrew all of its artists from the competition in protest against the festival organizers. A few months later, she got her major hit with her entry at Un disco per l'estate festival, "Andiamo a mietere il grano". In the following years, she became a staple of the summer festival, even if her songs failed to repeat the success of "Andiamo a mietere il grano". In 1970, she was finalist at the Festival di Napoli with two songs, "Quanno sponta Primavera" and "Fontanelle".

Louiselle died on 27 April 2024, at the age of 77.
