= Marino Marini (musician) =

- Born: 11 May 1924; Seggiano, Tuscany, Italy
- Died: 20 March 1997 (aged 72)
- Occupations: Singer-songwriter, musician
- Label: Durium

Marino Marini (11 May 1924 – 20 March 1997) was an Italian arranger, author, bandleader, composer, conductor, pianist and vocalist who achieved international success in the 1950s and 1960s.

== Biography ==
He was born into a family of musicians in Seggiano in the province of Grosseto to parents originally from Montecelio, Rome. After briefly studying electronics, he studied piano, violin and composition at the Rossini Conservatory in Bologna, teaching music on his graduation. In 1947, after military service, he was appointed artistic director of the Metropolitan music hall in Naples, where he developed a liking for Neapolitan music. In 1948 he visited the United States for six months, meeting Dizzy Gillespie, Stan Kenton and Charlie Ventura. American jazz was also a formative influence.

On his return, Marini wrote music for films and revues and played in cabaret in Rome and Naples.

In 1954, he placed a newspaper advert seeking "young musicians without experience, singing in tune. If not cheerful, don't apply." From the many applicants, he chose Gaetano "Totò" Savio (guitar), Sergio Peppino (drums), and Ruggero Cori (double bass and vocal) for a quartet, with Marini playing piano and occasionally singing solo. This quartet played together from 1954 to 1960, a period regarded as the Marino Marini Quartet's most prolific and successful. Quartet made their first recording on the Durium label in 1955. The following year, they appeared on Italian TV. Their recordings of "Guaglione", "Don Ciccio 'o piscatore", "Rico Vacilon", "La Pansè" and "Maruzzella" were very popular. "Guaglione" became the first European single to sell more than five million copies. It was used on the soundtrack of the 1999 film The Talented Mr. Ripley. Following this successful debut, Marini commenced touring with his quartet, in the following years performing in hundreds of concerts in western and eastern Europe, the US, the Middle East and Japan.

In 1958, he performed Mikis Theodorakis's "The Honeymoon Song" in Michael Powell's film Honeymoon. Marini's recordings in the late 1950s and early 1960s included covers of Domenico Modugno's "Volare", "Ciao ciao bambina" and Rocco Granata's "Marina". In 1960, they won the first and the second prizes in the Naples song festival with Ruggero singing "Serenata a Margellina" and Marino singing "Uè, uè, che femmena!". Shortly after this, the first quartet disbanded.

In 1961, he formed a new quartet with Bruno Guarnera (guitar), Petito di Pace (drums) and Vittorio Benvenuti (double bass, vocal, dance). The quartet was re-formed again in 1963 with Francesco Ventura (guitar), Sergio (drums), and Franco Cesarico (bass guitar and vocal).

Marino Marini's music was rooted in the tradition of Italian song, and in particular Neapolitan song, as he sometimes performed in the Neapolitan language (e.g. "Maruzzella"). Many of his numbers are in 4/4 or 4/8 time, but he sometimes used the 6/8 tarantella rhythm with an off-beat tempo accentuated by the piano on the second and fourth beat. He performed in several styles and genres, reinterpreting American standards or current pop songs (e.g. "Just Young") and using dance rhythms such as cha-cha-cha, the twist, the letkiss and the samba. He often combined genres (e.g. Neapolitan song and samba in "Don Ciccio 'o piscatore").

He made innovative use of the echo chamber (using one made to his own design) and is said to have been the first European performer to use sound mixing on stage, anticipating the techniques used by rock musicians in the 1960s.

Among the performers he influenced were French-Italian singers Dalida and Caterina Valente.

He retired from performing in 1966 but continued to compose. He died in March 1997.

== UK discography ==
=== Studio albums ===
- Marino Marini in London TLU 97008 Durium Records 12/1957
- Marino Marini at The London Palladium TLU 97018 Durium Records 3/1959
- The Marino Marini Quartet TLU 97028 Durium Records 1959
- Marino Marini Again TLU 97043 Durium Records 1962
- Marino Marini ed il suo Quartetto DRL 50003 Durium Records 1963
- Marino Marini ed il suo Quartetto – Volume 5 DRL 50019 Durium Records 1966

=== EPs ===
- Marino Marini and his Happy Music Vol. 1 U 20007 Durium Records 12/1957
- Marino Marini and his Happy Music Vol. 2 U 20020 Durium Records 12/1957
- The Marino Marini Quartet U 20027 Durium Records 12/1957
- Marino Marini and his Quartet Vol. 3 U 20028 Durium Records 1958
- That Crazy Quartet U 20030 Durium Records 1958
- The Marino Marini Quartet Vol. 2 U 20031 Durium Records 5/1958
- The Marino Marini Quartet Vol. 3 U 20036 Durium Records 12/1958
- Marino with a Latin Beat U 20042 Durium Records 1959
- Marino at San Remo U 20047 Durium Records 10/1959
- New Spotlight on Marino U 20049 Durium Records 1959
- Marino Marini at The London Palladium Vol. 1 U 20053 Durium Records 1959
- Marino Marini at The London Palladium Vol. 2 U 20054 Durium Records 1959
- San Remo Festival 1960 U 20063 Durium Records 1960
- Marino Sings The Hits U 20065 Durium Records 10/1960
- Marino Marini in Paris U 20069 Durium Records 1961
- Here Comes Marino U 20073 Durium Records 1961
- Marino Marini at San Remo 1962 U 20078 Durium Records 1962
- On The Dance Floor U 20080 Durium Records 1963
- On The Dance Floor Vol. 2 U 20081 Durium Records 1963
- The San Remo Festival 1964 U 20082 Durium Records 1964
- Amo solo te DRE 52005 Durium / Pye Records 1965

=== Singles ===
- Chella 'lla / Basta un poco di musica DC 16625 Durium Records
- Guaglione / La piu' bella del mondo DC 16626 Durium Records
- Marena' / Nanassa DC 16627 Durium Records
- Luna lunatica / Miguel DC 16628 Durium Records
- With All My Heart / The Pansy DC 16629 Durium Records
- Sur ma vie / Chu chu bella DC 16630 Durium Records
- Guitar Boogie / Armen's Theme DC 16631 Durium Records
- Come prima / Volare (Nel blu dipinto di blu) DC 16632 Durium Records
- I Could Have Danced All Night / Saunabad (Les gars de Rochechouart) DC 16634 Durium Records
- Stella Stella (Star Of Love) / Lazzarella DC 16635 Durium Records 12/1958
- Ciao ciao bambina (Piove) / Avevamo la stessa eta' DC 16636 Durium Records
- Io' sono il vento / Lì per lì DC 16637 Durium Records 03/1959
- The Honeymoon Song / Pimpollo DC 16640 Durium Records
- Sarra' chi sa' / Guarda che luna DC 16642 Durium Records 11/1959
- Sei bella / Marina DC 16644 Durium Records
- Romantica / Libero DC 16645 Durium Records
- Abbracciami / Mustapha DC 16648 Durium Records
- Luna napoletana / Oh! Oh! Rosy DC 16650 Durium Records
- Palma de Majorca / Fermati DC 16658 Durium Records
- Love And Kisses / The Beat Of My Heart DC 16662 Durium Records
- Jessica / It Is Better To Love DC 16664 Durium Records
- Rosita cha cha cha / Moliendo cafe DC 16666 Durium Records
