= Cinico Angelini =

Italian composer, arranger, pianist and record producer

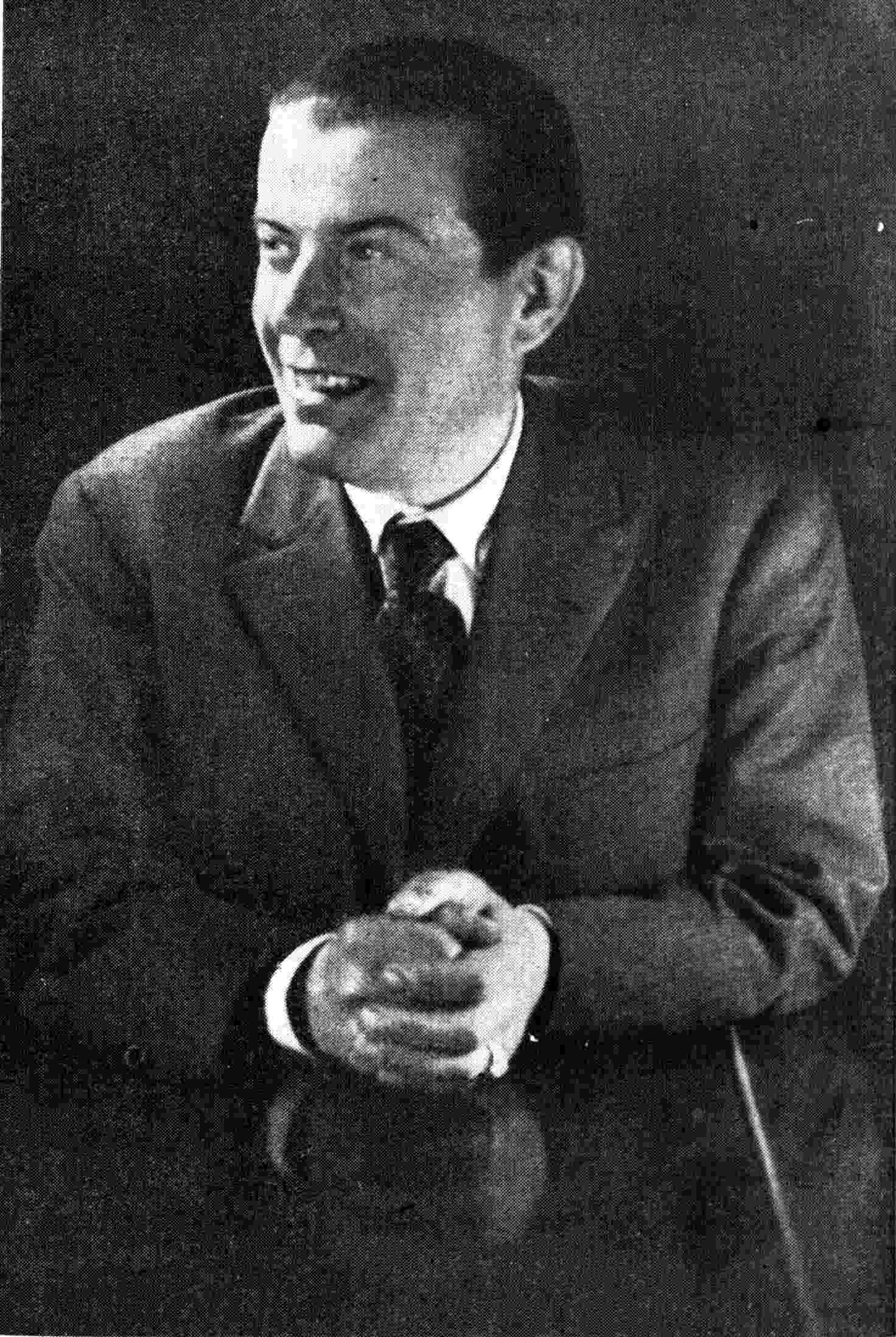
- Angelini in Radiocorriere magazine (1948)
- Born: Angelo Cinico; 12 November 1901; Crescentino, Italy
- Died: 7 July 1983 (aged 81); Rome, Italy
- Occupation(s): Composer, arranger, pianist and record producer
- Years active: 1964–2021

Angelo Cinico, best known as Cinico Angelini (12 November 1901 – 7 July 1983), was an Italian conductor, arranger and violinist.

== Life and career ==
After his studies at the Giuseppe Verdi Conservatory in Turin, Angelini started his career as jazz violinist in various ensembles. In 1925 he moved to Venezuela, where he stayed 5 years and made a name for himself as a conductor. Returned in Italy in 1930, he got a contract with the major dance hall of the time, Sala Gay in Turin, and he became so famous as to be employed as conductor of the EIAR orchestra and to be often asked to perform for Prince Umberto II.

=== Angelini Orchestra ===
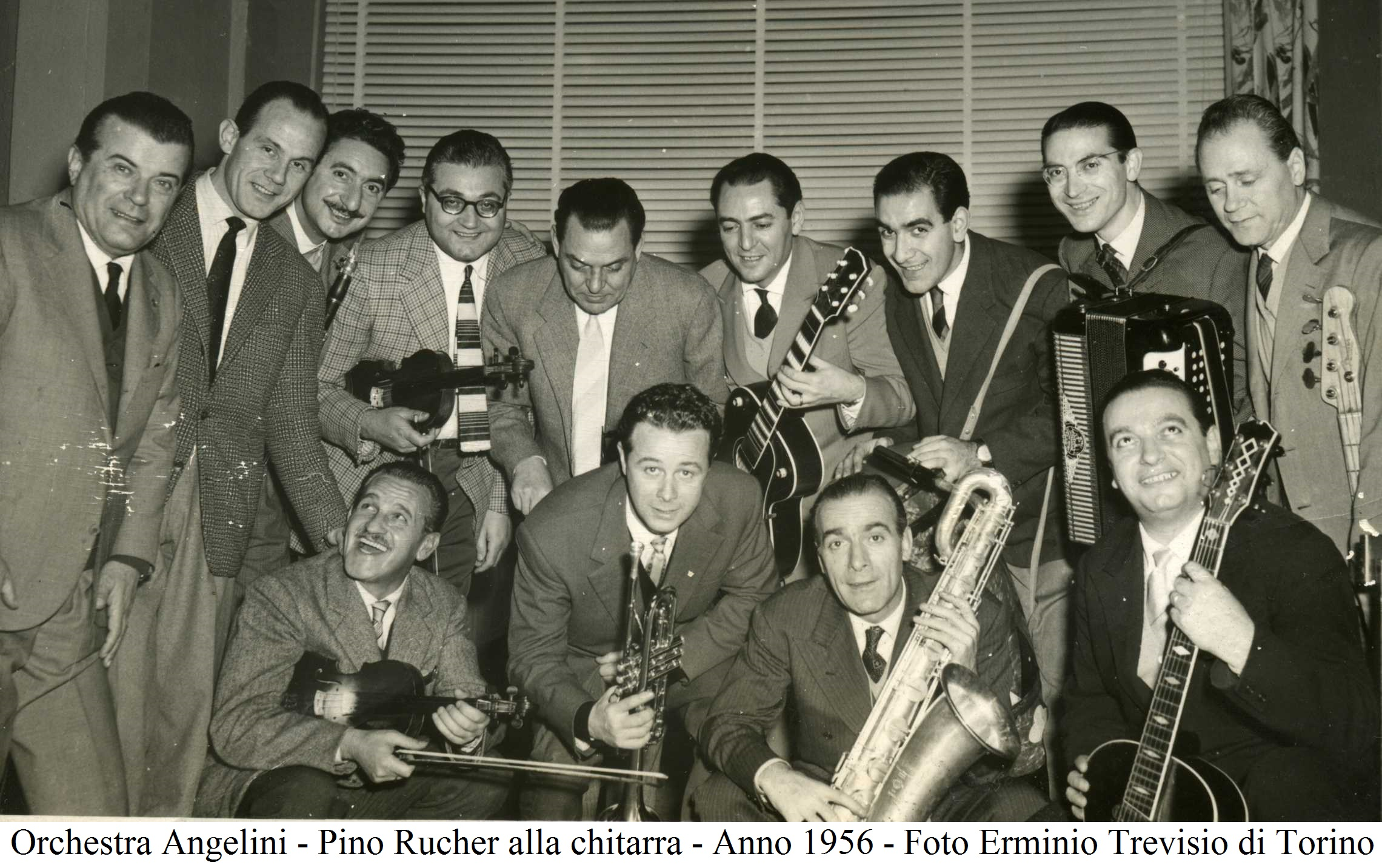

In the 1940s and 1950s he launched with his orchestra the career of several singers, including Nilla Pizzi, Achille Togliani, Gino Latilla, Gianni Ravera and Oscar Carboni. During these years the press put often him in contraposition with Pippo Barzizza, with Angelini representing the more traditional, melodic style against the more modern, swinging style of Barzizza. He directed the orchestra at the first eight editions of the Sanremo Music Festival. He retired in the early 1960s.
