= Mirna Doris =

Italian singer (1940–2020)

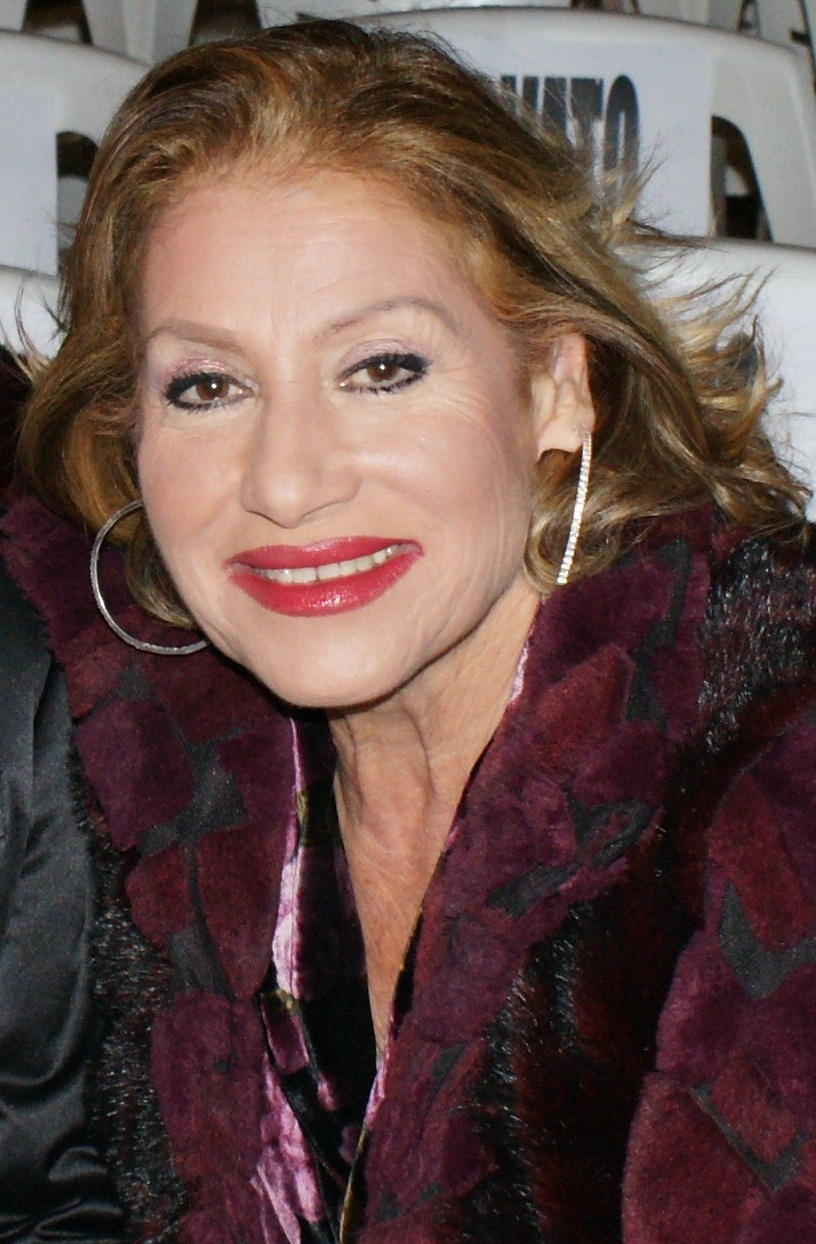
- Doris in 2009
- Born: 28 September 1940; Naples, Italy
- Died: 27 March 2020 (aged 79); Naples, Italy
- Occupation: Singer

Mirna Doris (28 September 1940 – 27 March 2020) was an Italian canzone napoletana singer, mainly successful in the second half of the 1960s.

== Life and career ==
Born Annunziata Chiarelli, in Naples, after studying singing Doris started performing in street festivals and private parties in her hometown, and in 1962 she was a finalist at the Castrocaro Music Festival.

Between 1963 and 1970 Doris entered the main competition at the Festival di Napoli, winning the competition in 1968 and in 1969 with the songs "Core spezzato" and "Preghiera a 'na mamma". During her career Doris also participated in several editions of Un disco per l'estate, Canzonissima and Festival delle rose.

In 2020, at age 79, she died of cancer.

== Discography ==
Album

- 1971: Mandulinata tragica (Fonorex, CS 1302)
- 1974: Tre volti di Mirna Doris (Fonorex, VM 1301)
- 1974: Hit parade (Fonorex, VM 1302)
- 1978: Mirna Doris (Vis Radio, LAEDDD 96904)
- 1980: Int’a ’n’ora Dio lavora (Hello, ZSEL 55468)
- 1981: Era de maggio (Hello, ZSEL 55473)
- 1983: Napulitanamente (Storm, ZSLTM 55483)
- 1983: Core spezzato (Start-Durium, LPS 40174)
- 1983: Che bella città (Sirio, K 00220)
- 1984: Ammore...ammore (Sirio, BK 75916)
- 1989: Napoli...una donna (Phonotype, AZQ 40117)
- 1989: Napoli...una donna vol. 2 (Phonotype, AZQ 40125)
- 1991: Napoli...una donna vol. 3 (Phonotype, AZQ 40137)
- 1992: Napoli...una donna vol. 4 (Phonotype, AZQ 40157)
