= Oscar Carboni =

Italian singer (1914-1993)

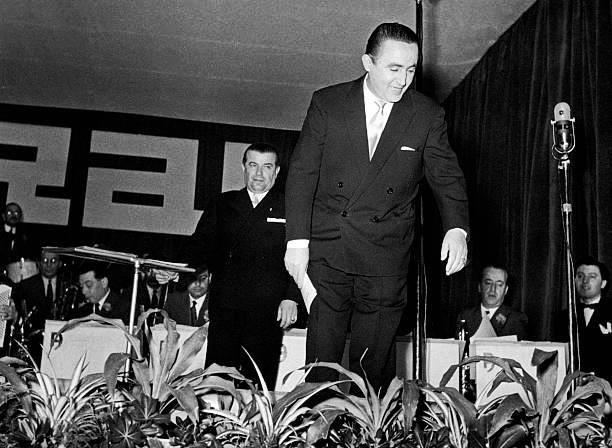
- Carboni at the Sanremo Music Festival 1952
- Born: 9 September 1914; Ferrara, Italy
- Died: 29 March 1993 (aged 78); Ferrara, Italy
- Occupation: Singer

Oscar Carboni (9 September 1914 – 29 March 1993) was an Italian singer, mainly successful in the 1940s.

== Life and career ==
Born in Ferrara, the younger of 21 children, Carboni began performing in the 1930s in the ballrooms of Emilia-Romagna. He started his professional career as a singer in 1940, after having won an EIAR contest for new musical artists. After one year as vocalist of the Pippo Barzizza orchestra, he entered the orchestra conducted by Cinico Angelini, with whom within two years he got some of his major successes, notably "Tango del mare", "Firenze sogna" and "Piccola Santa".

At the peak of his success, with the outbreak of World War II he was drafted, even if he was allowed to perform for the troops instead of going to the battlefield. After the war he started touring with various orchestras, and returned to success in the second half of the 1940s with the signature song "Serenata celeste" and minor hits such as "Serenata serena", "Cuore napoletano", "Acquarello napoletano".

In 1948, Carboni moved to Brazil for a long and successful tour in Latin America, which he eventually extended until 1951; during this time his domestical popularity and repertoire were inherited by other singers, namely Claudio Villa, Luciano Tajoli, and Giorgio Consolini. Returned in Italy, he re-entered the Angelini orchestra, and in 1952 he got his last successes, with "Madonna delle Rose" (fourth place at the Sanremo Music Festival 1952) and "Varca lucente" (his entry at the Festival di Napoli). In 1960 he left the Angelini orchestra, and until the 1980s he continued to perform in liscio dance halls, and also worked as an impresario and an agent. He was married to the singer and dancer Giorgia Vallieri (1915-1992).
