= Aurelio Fierro =

Italian actor and singer

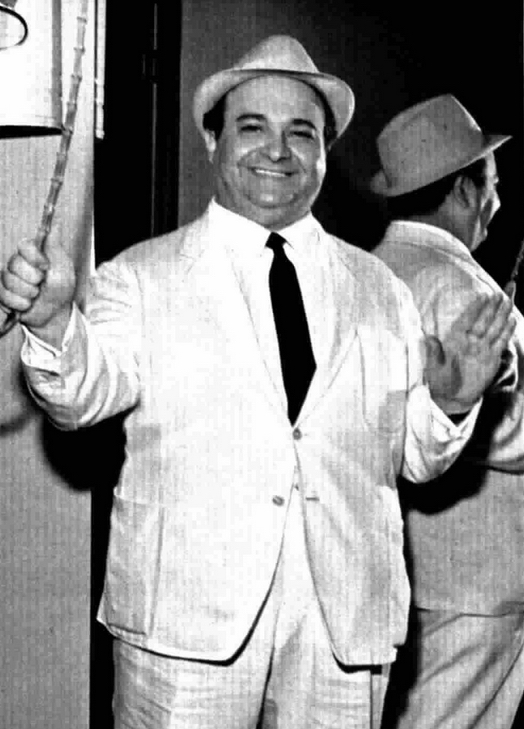
- Fierro in Radiocorriere magazine, 1968
- Born: 13 September 1923; Montella, Campania, Kingdom of Italy
- Died: 11 March 2005 (aged 81); Naples, Campania, Italy
- Occupations: Actor; singer
- Years active: 1951–2003
- Height: 1.64 m (5 ft 5 in)

Aurelio Fierro (13 September 1923 – 11 March 2005) was an Italian actor and singer, specialising in songs in the Neapolitan dialect.

== Career ==
He was born in Montella, in the Province of Avellino, Italy. His singing career began in 1951, after he came first place in a singing competition. He signed a recording contract with Durium Records to record songs in Italian and Napulitano. The following year, with the song "Rose, poveri rrose!", he came first in the Castellammare di Stabia music festival, and decided to become a professional singer.

His first big hit was with "Scapricciatiello", by Pacifico Vento and Ferdinando Albano, in 1954. In 1957 his song "Lazzarella" (written by Domenico Modugno and Riccardo Pazzaglia) was a success at the Naples song festival (Festival d'a Canzone Napulitana) and the eponymous film which followed (directed by Carlo Ludovico Bragaglia), in which he performed, was also a great success with the public. In the following years, he took part in the Sanremo Music Festival six times and toured worldwide, which contributed to his success abroad in the United States, South America and Japan. He was the singer of the winning song at the Naples song festival in 1961, 1965 and 1969.

His best-known songs are probably "Guaglione", recorded in 1956, and "A pizza" (by Alberto Testa and Bruno Martelli), from the Naples song festival of 1966.

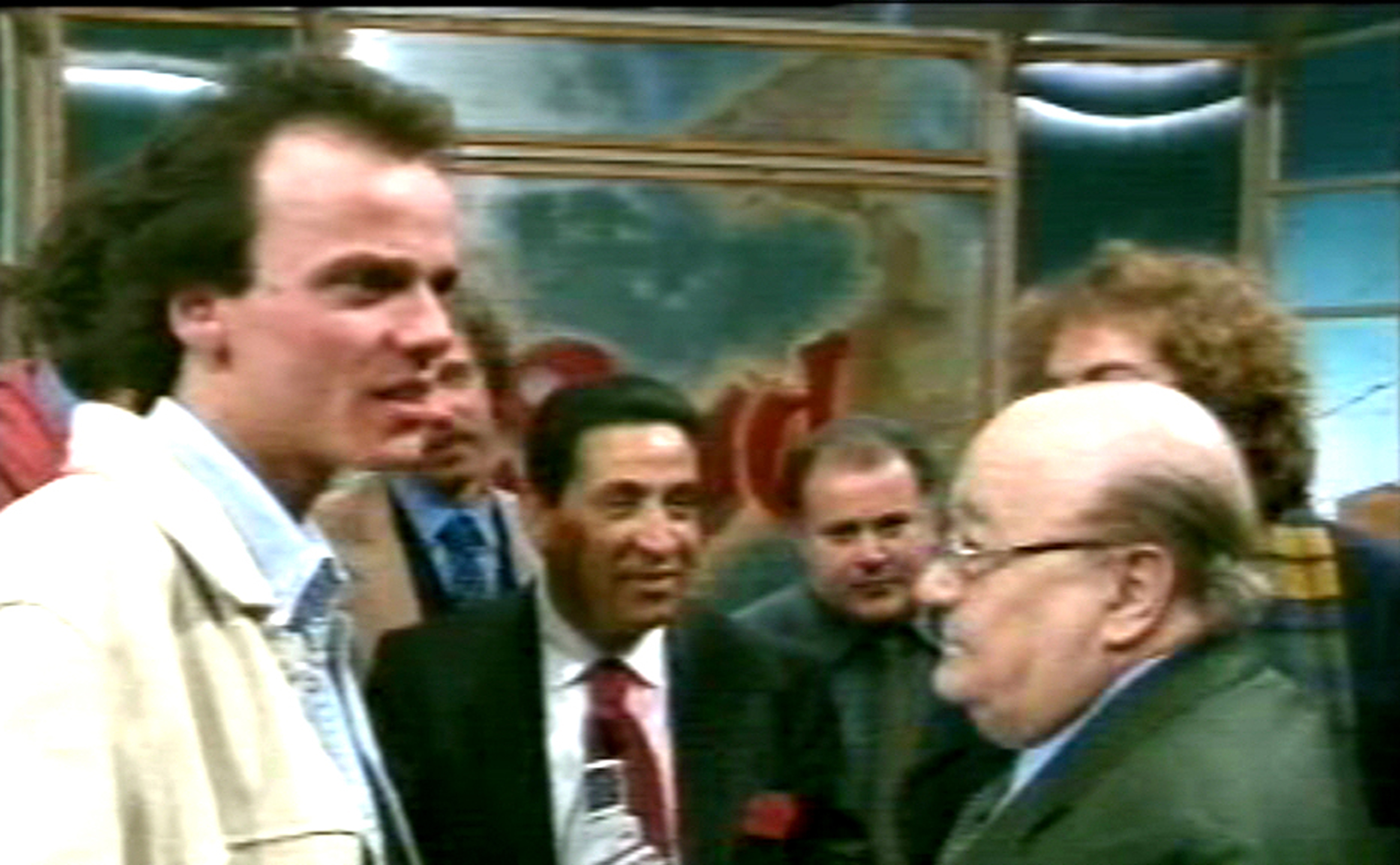
Gigi D'Alessio, Mario Trevi and Aurelio Fierro in 1998

He opened a restaurant in Naples, A canzuncella, where he entertained the patrons. He studied the Neapolitan language (Napulitano) and published a grammar (Grammatica della lingua napoletana) and a book on Neapolitan legends (Fiabe e leggende napoletane). He died after a stroke at Cardarelli Hospital, Naples.

== Albums (selection) ==
- 1955: Melodie del Golfo – 1 (Durium, ms Al 509)
- 1955: Melodie del Golfo – 2 (Durium, ms Al 510)
- 1955: Canzoni d'altri tempi – 1 (Durium, ms Al 518)
- 1956: 5º Festival della canzone – Sanremo 1955 (Durium, ms Al 524)
- 1956: Melodie del Golfo – 3 (Durium, ms Al 526)
- 1956: Melodie del Golfo – 4 (Durium, ms Al 546)
- 1956: Canzoni d'altri tempi – 2 (Durium, ms Al 548)
- 1956: Canzoni d'altri tempi – 3 (Durium, ms Al 562)
- 1956: 4º Festival della Canzone Napoletana 1956 (Durium, ms Al 565)
- 1957: V Festival della canzone napoletana - 1957 (Durium, ms Al 578)
- 1957: Piedigrotta 1957 (Durium, ms Al 587)
- 1958: Canzoni d'altri tempi - 4 (Durium, ms Al 593)
- 1958: VI Festival della canzone napoletana (Durium, ms Al 594)
- 1959: Canzoni di successo (Durium, ms A 77011)
- 1959: Canzoni napoletane celebri (Durium, ms A 77025)

== Singles (selection) ==
- 1955: 'O surdato 'nnammurato/'O mare 'e Mergellina (Durium, Ld A 6006)
- 1955: 'O Nzisto/Spatella 'argiento (Durium, Ld A 6011)
- 1955: Scapricciatiello/'A ze' maesta (Durium, Ld A 6012)
- 1956: La vita è un paradiso di bugie/Nota per nota (Durium, Ld A 6041)
- 1956: Guaglione/Dincello tu (Durium, Ld A 6053)
- 1957: Corde della mia chitarra/Usignolo (Durium, Ld A 6075)
- 1957: Invocazione a Maria SS. di Montevergine parte 1^/Invocazione a Maria SS. di Montevergine parte 2^ (Durium, Ld A 6081)
- 1957: Io e Cjiccio cha cha/Serenatella sciè sciè (Durium, Ld A 6082)
- 1957: Lucianella/Chella là (Durium, Ld A 6083)
- 1957: Lazzarella/Napule, sole mio (Durium, Ld A 6102)
- 1957: Serenatella 'e maggio/Luna parlante (Durium, Ld A 6106)
- 1957: Mister Napule/'A sunnambula (Durium, Ld A 6151)
- 1957: Come pioveva/Signorinella (Durium, Ld A 6152)
- 1957: Parlami d'amore Mariù/La canzone dell'amore (Durium, Ld A 6153)
- 1957: Miniera/Il tango delle capinere (Durium, Ld A 6154)
- 1957: Guappetiello 'e tutte 'e ssere/Pazzagliona (Durium, Ld A 6169)
- 1958: Mambo toscano/La macchina ce l'hai (Durium, Ld A 6200)
- 1958: La canzone che piace a te/Timida serenata (Durium, Ld A 6209)
- 1958: Fragole e cappellini/Nel blu dipinto di blu (Durium, Ld A 6210)
- 1958: Piemontesina/Portami tante rose (Durium, Ld A 6233)
- 1958: Tango del mare/Reginella campagnola (Durium, Ld A 6234)
- 1958: Calypso melody/Calypso italiano (Durium, Ld A 6255)
- 1958: Rosì tu sei l'ammore/Vurria (Durium, Ld A 6273)
- 1958: Giulietta e Romeo/Sincerità (Durium, Ld A 6275)
- 1958: Tuppe, tuppe, Mariscia'/Torna a vuca' (Durium, Ld A 6276)
- 1958: Fili d'oro/Addio signora (Durium, Ld A 6319)
- 1958: Amor di pastorello/Cara piccina (Durium, Ld A 6320)
- 1958: Le rose rosse/Torna al paesello (Durium, Ld A 6321)
- 1958: Capinera/Reginella (Durium, Ld A 6322)
- 1958: Domandalo a mammà/Fravulella (Durium, Ld A 6352)
- 1958: Rondine al nido/Non ti scordar di me (Durium, Ld A 6366)
- 1958: Tic-ti tic-ta/Come le rose (Durium, Ld A 6367)
- 1958: Canti nuovi/Stornelli dell'aviatore (Durium, Ld A 6368)
- 1958: Vipera/Pallida mimosa (Durium, Ld A 6369)
- 1958: Dduje paravise/Un'ora sola ti vorrei (Durium, Ld A 6393)
- 1958: Come una coppa di champagne/Scettico blues (Durium, Ld A 6415)
- 1958: Spazzacamino/Lucciole vagabonde (Durium, Ld A 6416)
- 1958: Ivonne/Abat-jour (Durium, Ld A 6417)
- 1959: Qualche filo bianco/Balocchi e profumi (Durium, Ld A 6446)
- 1959: Partir con te/Lì per lì (Durium, Ld A 6471)
- 1959: Io sono il vento/Avevamo la stessa età (Durium, Ld A 6472)
- 1959: Accussi'/Ammore celeste (Durium, Ld A 6572)
- 1959: Vieneme 'nzuonno/Napule 'ncopp'a luna (Durium, Ld A 6577)
- 1960: Il mare/Libero (Durium, Ld A 6740)
- 1960: Silenzio cantatore/'O marenariello (Durium, Ld A 6756)
- 1960: Pellegrinaggio per S. Gerardo di Caposele parte 1^/Pellegrinaggio per S. Gerardo di Caposele parte 2^ (Durium, Ld A 6759)
- 1960: Gina mia/Il solletico (Durium, Ld A 6784)
- 1960: Piove, piove, piove/E uno, e due, e tre (Durium, Ld A 6785)
- 1960: Lacreme napulitane/Luna rossa (Durium, Ld A 6797)
- 1960: Maria Marì/Napule ca se ne va (Durium, Ld A 6798)
- 1960: Invocazione alla Madonna dell'arco parte 1^/Invocazione alla Madonna dell'arco parte 2^ (Durium, Ld A 6799)
- 1960: Uè uè, che femmena/Sti 'mmane... (Durium, Ld A 6822)
- 1960: Serenata a Margellina/Nuvole (Durium, Ld A 6823)
- 1960: Lunarella/Ammore, appuntamento mio! (Durium, Ld A 6939)
- 1960: Paese mio/Nu vasillo a pezzechillo (Durium, Ld A 6940)
- 1960: Donna/Passa la ronda (Durium, Ld A 6949)
- 1960: La violetera/Appassionatamente (Durium, Ld A 6950)
- 1960: Chitarra romana/Campane (Durium, Ld A 6996)
- 1960: Violino tzigano/Fiocca la neve (Durium, Ld A 6997)
- 1961: Cielo!/'O tesoro (Durium, Ld A 7051)
- 1961: Tu si 'a malincunia/Pi-Rikì-Kukè (Durium, Ld A 7075)
- 1961: 'O cunfessore/Tutta 'a famiglia (Durium, Ld A 7076)
- 1961: Povero Masaniello/T'aspetto Tutt' 'E ssere (Durium, Ld A 7084)
- 1961: Invocazione al SS. Salvatore parte 1^/Invocazione al SS. Salvatore parte 2^ (Durium, Ld A 7088)
- 1961: Du stehst in meinem sternen (Tu sì 'a malincunia)/Tutta 'a famiglia (Durium, Ld A 7123)
- 1962: Ferriera/Signora Illusione (Durium, Ld A 7142)
- 1962: Chiesetta alpina/Fontane (Durium, Ld A 7143)
- 1962: Lui andava a cavallo/Cipria di sole (Durium, Ld A 7144)
- 1962: Ladra/Ciondolo d'or (Durium, Ld A 7194)
- 1962: Serenata malandrina/Pulecenella twist (Durium, Ld A 7204)
- 1963: Peppino 'o suricillo/Maurizio (King, AFK 56000)
- 1963: Occhi neri e cielo blu/La ballata del pedone (King, AFK 56001)
- 1963: Un cappotto rivoltato/Non costa niente (King, AFK 56002)
- 1963: 'O marenaro/Zappatore (King, AFK 56003)
- 1963: Carcere/'A legge (King, AFK 56004)
- 1963: 'O festino/Carcerato (King, AFK 56005)
- 1963: Bossanova italiano/Ho rubato la luna (King, AFK 56009)
- 1963: Quanto me piace/L'ammore è nu murzillo sapurito (King, AFK 56011)
- 1963: Scugnezziello/Ma che parlo a fà (King, AFK 56012)
- 1963: Maria yè yè/Tango napoletano (King, AFK 56013)
- 1963: Preghiera napulitana/Limbo napoletano (King, AFK 56014)
- 1963: 'O capitone/A cantata d'e pasture (King, AFK 56018)
- 1964: Sole, pizza e amore/Balliamo il tango (King, AFK 56019)
- 1964: Torna al tuo paesello/Partire (King, AFK 56021)
- 1964: Vivere/La mia canzone al vento (King, AFK 56023)
- 1964: Che mi tuffo a far.../'O bikine/Che caldo (King, AFK 56026)
- 1964: Mo (me ne vaco a Pusilleco)/Canzona profumata (Bella...bel) (King, AFK 56030)
- 1964: Maria Carmela/Fidanzata su misura) (King, AFK 56031)
- 1964: Nun m'abbraccià/L'eterno caporale (King, AFK 56032; lato A cantato insieme a Mirna Doris)
- 1964: Hully gully paesano/La gonna scozzese (King, AFK 56033)
- 1964: Lazzarella/Tu sì a malincunia (King, AFK 56035)
- 1965: Tanti auguri a te/Buon anno... buona fortuna... (Durium, Ld M 7401)
- 1965: Si 'a gente se facesse 'e fatte suoje.../Totonno 'o nirone (King, AFK 56041)
- 1965: Serenata all'acqua 'e mare/Vulesse nu favore (King, AFK 56042)
- 1966: Brigadiere mio/'O re 'e ll'ammore (King, AFK 56051)
- 1966: 'A pizza/'Na guagliona ye' ye' (King, AFK 56053)
- 1966: Femmene e tammorre/Fatta apposta pe fà nnammurà (King, AFK 56056)
- 1966: A risa/Ah l'ammore che ffa fa (King, AFK 56060)
- 1967: Pulecenella 'o core 'e Napule/'A minigonna (King, AFK 56066)
- 1967: Mare pittato 'e luna/Sbagliasse maie 'na vota (King, AFK 56067)
- 1967: 'O matusa/'O vesuvio (King, AFK 56073)
- 1968: E voga gondolier/Una gondola d'amor (King, AFK 56078)
- 1968: 'O trapianto/'O timido (King, AFK 56080)
- 1968: Ricordo 'e maggio/Stornellaccio beat (King, AFK 56086)
- 1969: Giuvanne simpatia/Vocca busciarda (King, AFK 56102)
- 1969: Preghiera a 'na mamma/Non c'è due senza tre (King, AFK 56103)
- 1971: Bello 'e papà/'O pizzo a riso (King, NSP 56125)

== See also ==
Article on 'A pizza on Napulitano Wikipedia
