= Achille Togliani =

Italian singer and actor

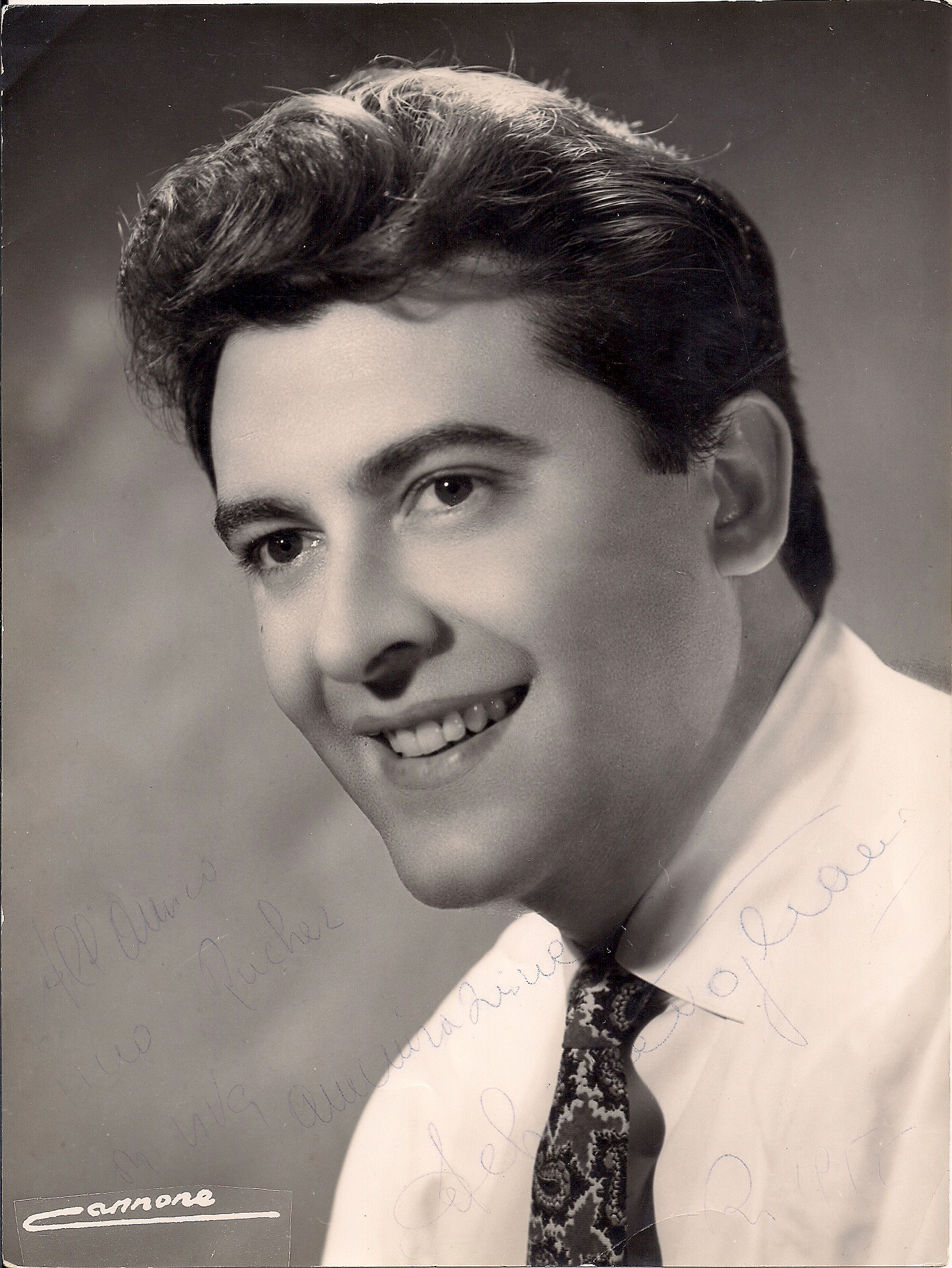
Achille Togliani in 1954

Achille Togliani (Italian pronunciation: [aˈkille toʎˈʎaːni]; 16 January 1924 in Pomponesco – 12 August 1995) was an Italian singer and actor. He was a participant in the first Sanremo Music Festival in 1951.

Togliani's version of the song "Parlami d'amore Mariù" was used in the commercial of the perfume Light Blue by Dolce & Gabbana.

== Selected filmography ==
- I'm the Hero (1952)
- Naples Is Always Naples (1954)
- Tears of Love (1954)
