= 1957 in Danish television =

This is a list of Danish television related events from 1957.

== Events ==
- 17 February – Birthe Wilke & Gustav Winckler are selected to represent Denmark at the 1957 Eurovision Song Contest with their song "Skibet skal sejle i nat". They are selected to be the first Danish Eurovision entry during Dansk Melodi Grand Prix held at the Radiohouse in Copenhagen.
- 3 March – Denmark enters the Eurovision Song Contest for the first time with "Skibet skal sejle i nat" performed by Birthe Wilke & Gustav Winckler.

== See also ==
- 1957 in Denmark
