= Belgium in the Eurovision Song Contest 1957 =

- Eurovision Song Contest 1957
- Participating broadcaster: Nationaal Instituut voor de Radio-omroep (NIR) (Note: Nationaal Instituut voor de Radio-omroep (NIR) was the official Dutch-language name of the National Broadcasting Institute (NIR/INR).)
- Country: Belgium
- Selection process: Artist: Internal selection Song: De T.V. maakt muziek
- Selection date: Artist: January 1957; Song: 19 February 1957

Competing entry
- Song: "Straatdeuntje"
- Artist: Bobbejaan Schoepen
- Songwriters: Harry Frekin; Eric Franssen

Placement
- Final result: 8th, 5 votes

Participation chronology

Belgium was represented at the Eurovision Song Contest 1957 with the song "Straatdeuntje", composed by Harry Frekin, with lyrics by Eric Franssen, and performed by Bobbejaan Schoepen. The Dutch-speaking department of the Belgian participating broadcaster, the National Broadcasting Institute (NIR/INR), selected its entry through a national final, after having previously selected the performer internally.

== Before Eurovision ==
The National Broadcasting Institute (NIR/INR), whose official name in Dutch was Nationaal Instituut voor de Radio-omroep (NIR), delegated its participation in the Eurovision Song Contest 1957 to its Dutch-speaking department. NIR used an internal selection to choose Bobbejaan Schoepen as its artist. Schoepen was contacted by telegram by NIR in 1956 while being on tour in the United States. The broadcaster announced Schoepen as the Belgian entrant in late January 1957.

=== Format ===
NIR opted to select their entry with a ten-member expert jury panel. It also presented the competing entries to the public in a special edition of the TV program De T.V. maakt muziek.

==== Competing entries ====
In order to select a song, NIR asked seven composers to write one song each for Schoepen, with each composer choosing freely their lyricist. The expert jury selected three of them for a national final.

The jury was appointed by Jan Boon, director of the Dutch-speaking department. It consisted of Nic Bal (deputy head of TV), Francis Bay (conductor), Robert Bosmans (Charles Bens), Bob Boon (NIR music program director), Léonce Gras (NIR musical director), Jack Kluger (music publisher), Albert Rollewagen (music publisher), Paul Van Dessel (NIR TV director) and Renaat Verbruggen (singer), with Marcel Poot (composer) acting as jury president.

Since Schoepen was still in the United States, the jury based its first selection upon recordings of the songs with other artists. The singers of the three finalist songs are unknown, but the singers of the other four are known as they were performed by their artists during the episode of De T.V. maakt muziek.

According to André Vermeulen, "Straatdeuntje" was possibly sung by Jean Walter, "Zomernacht in 'Gay Paree'" possibly by Eric Franssen, and one of the three songs was sung by Terry Lester.

Competing entries
Artist	Song	Songwriter(s)		Result
Artist	Song	Composer(s)	Lyricist(s)	Result
Rina Pia	"De jodelende koe"	Johnny Steggerda		—N/a
Wim Van de Velde	"Brave boerinnekens"	Jef Trappeniers	Luc Verbist	—N/a
Wim Van de Velde	"Alleen voor jou chérie" (Note: Also called "Voor jou chérie" in other sources.)	Jack Say	Nelly Byl	—N/a
Eric Franssen	"Het huisje op de heide" (Note: Also called "O mijn huisje op de heide" in other sources.)	Armand Preud'homme	Eugeen De Ridder	—N/a
Unknown	"Zomernacht in 'Gay Paree'"	Jan Stevens; Max Sluys; Eric Franssen		Qualified
Unknown	"Straatdeuntje"	Harry Frekin	Eric Franssen	Qualified
Unknown	"Het beeld van mijn moeder"	Hans Flower	Leo Campus	Qualified

=== De T.V. maakt muziek ===
De TV maakt muziek was a monthly television program on NIR's Dutch-language television channel with light music and dance performances, without any presenter. On 19 February 1957, an edition of the show was aired which featured the competing songs for the national selection. It was produced in the Sonart studio in Brussels. It was broadcast on 20:45 CET (19:45 UTC) on NIR and also in the Netherlands on Nederlandse Televisie Stichting (NTS), with a duration of 45 minutes. De TV maakt muziek was produced by Paul Van Dessel and directed by Charles "Chuck" Kerremans.

During the program, Bobbejaan Schoepen performed the three finalist songs. In addition, the four eliminated entries were also performed during the program, in this case by the original artists. The performances were accompanied by the NIR entertainment orchestra, conducted by Francis Bay, and the Oscar Denayer ensemble.

De T.V. Maakt Muziek title card

Bobbejaan Schoepen in De T.V. Maakt Muziek.

The show featured a large artificial long-distance telephone switchboard where each upcoming performance was announced through its title and an association with a location. De TV maakt muziek was praised by TV magazine De TV-kijker for its set design by Jean Marlier, which included also an authentic watermill with running water and an autumn landscape. It also called the show "one of the best presented programs on Belgian television." In contrast, Dutch newspaper Het Parool called the national final entries "old-fashioned" and the style of the whole show "childish and amateurish".

Winning entry Competing entry Eliminated prior to show

De T.V. maakt muziek - 19 February 1957
R/O	Artist	Song
1	instrumental	Untitled
2	Wim Van de Velde	"Brave boerinnekens"
3	Babe Broke	"Esa es la moña"
4	Bobbejaan Schoepen	"Straatdeuntje"
5	Al Verlane Quartet	"Moonglow" / "Hey There"
6	Rina Pia	"De jodelende koe"
7	instrumental	"Lullaby of Birdland"
8	Bobbejaan Schoepen	"Zomernacht in 'Gay Paree'"
9	Babe Broke	"Casa Portuguesa"
10	Eric Franssen	"Het huisje op de heide"
11	Wim Van de Velde	"Alleen voor jou, chérie"
12	Jenny Versmissen	"My Curly Headed Baby"
13	Bobbejaan Schoepen	"Het beeld van mijn moeder"
14	instrumental	"Autumn Concerto"

==== Final selection ====
It was planned that both a jury and members of the general public should be able to vote in order to decide Belgium's entry. Initial plans foresaw public voting taking place in several cities, among them Brussels and Antwerp. NIR later dropped the idea of the audience having their say, announcing that the jury alone was entirely representative.

Voting in the final was done by a jury consisting of the same ten-member panel as for the selection of the entries of the national final, with Gerd Mertens voting instead of either Robert Bosmans or jury president Marcel Poot. (Note: Just before the show, continuity announcer Terry Van Ginderen reads out the list of the jury members, giving eleven names, with Robert Bosmans alongside Gerd Mertens, and Marcel Poot as eleventh member and jury president. However, according to André Vermeulen, Gerd Mertens replaced Robert Bosmans for the voting in the national final. In any case, the final result was based on votes from ten jurors.)

The jury panel prepared to vote by watching the final of the Sanremo Music Festival 1957 and listening to the Dutch entry.

Each jury member made a ranking of the three songs and the ranking positions then were summed so that the winner was the song with the lowest total score. "Straatdeuntje" (Note: The title of the song also appears as "Langs de straten danst er een deuntje" in Belgian press reports ahead of the contest.), written by Harry Frekin with lyrics by Eric Franssen, came first with a score of 16. On 20 February 1957, De Telegraaf reported that "Straatdeuntje" had been selected as the Belgian entry.

Final selection – Detailed voting results
R/O	Song	Jury										Total
R/O	Song	1	2	3	4	5	6	7	8	9	10	Total
1	"Straatdeuntje"	1	1	2	1	1	1	3	2	2	2	16
2	"Zomernacht in 'Gay Paree'"	2	2	3	2	3	2	2	1	1	3	21
3	"Het beeld van mijn moeder"	3	3	1	3	2	3	1	3	3	1	23

== At Eurovision ==
At the Eurovision Song Contest in Frankfurt, the Belgian entry was the first of the night, preceding Luxembourg. At the close of voting, Belgium had received five points in total; the country finished shared eight among the ten participants. The Belgian jury gave half of its points, five, to the winning country, the Netherlands.

The Eurovision Song Contest 1957 was broadcast in Belgium on the television channels of Dutch- and French-speaking television channels of NIR/INR, as well as on NIR's Dutch-Language radio. Robert Beauvais commented for French-speaking viewers.

=== Voting ===
Each participating broadcaster assembled a ten-member jury panel. Every jury member could give one vote to their favourite song. The Belgian jury consisted of the same members as for the selection of the songs for the national final, i.e. Nic Bal, Francis Bay, Robert Bosmans, Bob Boon, Léonce Gras, Jack Kluger, Albert Rollewagen, Paul Van Dessel, Renaat Verbruggen, and Marcel Poot.

Votes awarded to Belgium
Score	Country
2 votes	Denmark; Germany
1 vote	Switzerland

Votes awarded by Belgium
Score	Country
5 votes	Netherlands
2 votes	France
1 vote	Germany; Italy; United Kingdom
