= France in the Eurovision Song Contest 1957 =

- Eurovision Song Contest 1957
- Participating broadcaster: Radiodiffusion-Télévision Française (RTF)
- Country: France
- Selection process: Internal selection
- Announcement date: 2 March 1957

Competing entry
- Song: "La Belle Amour"
- Artist: Paule Desjardins
- Songwriters: Guy Lafarge; Francis Carco

Placement
- Final result: 2nd, 17 votes

Participation chronology

France was represented at the Eurovision Song Contest 1957 with the song "La Belle Amour", composed by Guy Lafarge, with lyrics by Francis Carco, and performed by Paule Desjardins. Though French participating broadcaster Radiodiffusion-Télévision Française (RTF) held a national final to select its entry, it ultimately switched to an internal selection. "La Belle Amour" was performed eighth at the contest and placed second, receiving 17 points.

== Before Eurovision ==
=== Sept villes, une chanson ===
Radiodiffusion-Télévision Française (RTF) aired Sept villes, une chanson on its television channel every two weeks on Fridays between 21 December 1956 and 28 February 1957 at 20:40 CET. It was directed by Igor Barrère and presented by Robert Beauvais in a studio in Paris.

In each show, five new songs were presented. The songs were arranged by Armand Migiani, and accompanied by an orchestra under the direction of Paul Durand. Each song was presented twice, once sung, and once in an instrumental version or sung by a different artist.

Six juries sitting in six French cities chose a winner in each show, with the sixth and last jury to give its vote usually being the jury in Paris. Despite the title of the show ("Seven cities, one song"), the heats usually featured juries from only six cities, with the exception of the first heat of 21 December 1957, which featured juries from seven cities.

Every jury consisted of 11 viewers who watched the broadcast on television. Each juror gave one vote to their favourite song. Robert Beauvais called the juries on telephone and oversaw the voting with the help of a scoreboard in the studio. According to newspaper L'Aurore, due to technical issues regarding the telephone lines, all juries were relocated to Paris after the first show.

==== Heat 1 ====
The first heat of Sept villes, une chanson was aired on 21 December 1956. Five songs were presented. The winning song "Le Petit Homme et la noix" was written by Henri Bourtayre, with lyrics by Francis Blanche. For the interval act, Paule Desjardins performed "Paris palace hôtel".

Heat 1 – 21 December 1956
| First Performance | | Second Performance | | Song | Songwriter(s) | Votes | Place |
| R/O | Artist | R/O | Artist | Song | Songwriter(s) | Votes | Place |
|---|---|---|---|---|---|---|---|
| 1 | Francis Linel | 7 | Paul Péri | "Vive le mariage" | Unknown | 8 | 3 |
| 2 | Jacqueline Roland | 4 | Instrumental | "Le Petit Homme et la noix" | Henri Bourtayre; Francis Blanche | 34 | 1 |
| 3 | Claudine Céréda and Paul Mattei | 8 | Catherine Maisse | "Quand ton amour sera fini" | André Grassi | 4 | 5 |
| 5 | Georges Blaness | 9 | Instrumental | "Rio" | Unknown | 6 | 4 |
| 6 | Les Blue Stars | 10 | Paule Desjardins | "Il est là" | Magenta; Simone Vallauris | 22 | 2 |

Heat 1 – Detailed jury voting results
| Song | Lille | Strasbourg | Nancy | Lyon | Marseille | Nice | Paris (Note: The jury of Paris distributed only 8 votes in this heat.) | Total |
|---|---|---|---|---|---|---|---|---|
| "Vive le mariage" | 4 | 1 | | 1 | | 1 | 1 | 8 |
| "Le Petit Homme et la noix" | | 6 | 3 | 5 | 8 | 5 | 7 | 34 |
| "Quand ton amour sera fini" | | 2 | | 2 | | | | 4 |
| "Rio" | | | 6 | | | | | 6 |
| "Il est là" | 7 | 2 | 2 | 3 | 3 | 5 | | 22 |

==== Heat 2 ====
The second heat of Sept villes, une chanson was aired on 4 January 1957. Five new songs were presented. The winning song "Le Manteau de laine" was written by Léo Chauliac and Henri Contet. As the interval act, Jacqueline Roland performed the winning song from heat 1, "Le Petit Homme et la noix".

An incident occurred during the voting: Despite the rules that allowed each jury to distribute only 11 votes, the jury of Lille distributed 28 votes. The spokespersons of the following juries in Lyon and Nice protested against this irregularity before giving their respective votes, wrongly accusing Marseille instead of Lille. Presenter Robert Beauvais promised that the matter would be investigated, but ultimately continued the voting. He apologised to viewers for the error in the next heat on 18 January 1957.

Heat 2 – 4 January 1957
| First Performance | | Second Performance | | Song | Songwriter(s) | Votes | Place |
| R/O | Artist | R/O | Artist | Song | Songwriter(s) | Votes | Place |
|---|---|---|---|---|---|---|---|
| 1 | Marcel Amont | 4 | Instrumental | "Le Photographe" | Emer; Coulonges | 13 | 3 |
| 2 | Nadine Young | 7 | Les Blue Stars | "Ma Petite Femme et moi" (Note: Presented and sung with the title "Mon Petit homme et moi" for the performance by Nadine Young) | Unknown | 18 | 2 |
| 3 | John Littleton | 8 | Simone Langlois | "Le Manteau de laine" | Léo Chauliac; Henri Contet | 29 | 1 |
| 5 | Hélène Martin | 10 | Jean Arnaud | "Le bleu c'est pour les amoureux" | Unknown | 10 | 5 |
| 6 | Catherine Gay | 9 | Instrumental | "La Polka du petit poisson rouge" | G. Matis | 13 | 3 |

Heat 2 – Detailed jury voting results
| Song | Marseille | Lille | Lyon | Nice | Strasbourg | Paris | Total |
|---|---|---|---|---|---|---|---|
| "Le Photographe" | | 7 | 1 | 4 | | 1 | 13 |
| "Ma Petite Femme et moi" | | 5 | 1 | 4 | 8 | | 18 |
| "Le Manteau de laine" | 3 | 10 | 5 | 1 | 3 | 7 | 29 |
| "Le bleu c'est pour les amoureux" | 2 | 3 | 3 | 2 | | | 10 |
| "La Polka du petit poisson rouge" | 6 | 3 | 1 | | | 3 | 13 |

==== Heat 3 ====
The third heat of Sept villes, une chanson was aired on 18 January 1957. It was in this heat that Robert Beauvais announced for the first time that the show would serve as the selection for the French entry in the upcoming Eurovision Song Contest. Five new songs were presented. The winning song "C'est demain" was written by Francis Lemarque and Marc Heyral. John Littleton performed the winning song from heat 2, "Le Manteau de laine", as the interval act.

Heat 3 – 18 January 1957
| First Performance | | Second Performance | | Song | Songwriter(s) | Votes | Place |
| R/O | Artist | R/O | Artist | Song | Songwriter(s) | Votes | Place |
|---|---|---|---|---|---|---|---|
| 1 | Suc et Serre | 8 | Jacques Vérières | "Le Clodo des toits" | Jean-Pierre Suc | 4 | 5 |
| 2 | Jean Bertola | 5 | Instrumental | "C'est demain" | Francis Lemarque; Marc Heyral | 18 | 1 |
| 3 | Mathé Altéry | 7 | Instrumental | "Celui que j'aime" | Unknown | 16 | 2 |
| 4 | Jacques Leroy | 9 | Les Quatre de Paris | "La Cour de mon école" | Jacques Leroy; R. Bernard | 16 | 2 |
| 6 | Lucette Raillat | 10 | Pierre Louki | "La Môme aux boutons" | Lacome; Pierre Louki | 12 | 4 |

Heat 3 – Detailed jury voting results
| Song | Nancy | Marseille | Mulhouse | Lyon | Roubaix | Paris | Total |
|---|---|---|---|---|---|---|---|
| "Le Clodo des toits" | | 1 | | 2 | | 1 | 4 |
| "C'est demain" | 3 | | 1 | 2 | 9 | 3 | 18 |
| "Celui que j'aime" | 3 | | 8 | 4 | | 1 | 16 |
| "La Cour de mon école" | 3 | 6 | 1 | 3 | | 3 | 16 |
| "La Môme aux boutons" | 2 | 4 | 1 | | 2 | 3 | 12 |

==== Heat 4 ====
The fourth heat of Sept villes, une chanson was aired on 1 February 1957. The winning song from heat 3, "C'est demain" was played by Joss Baselli and Paul Durand's orchestra in an instrumental version as the interval act.

Heat 4 – 1 February 1957
| First Performance | | Second Performance | | Song | Songwriter(s) |
| R/O | Artist | R/O | Artist | Song | Songwriter(s) |
|---|---|---|---|---|---|
| 1 | Renée Pierre | 6 | Les Quatre Barbus | "Encore de l'argent" | Unknown |
| 2 | Jean-Louis Tristan | 5 | Instrumental | "Je m'ballade dans Paname" | Unknown |
| 3 | Lucette Raillat | 10 | Georges Blaness | "Au bal du samedi" | Unknown |
| 4 | Line Andrès | 8 | Bob Martin (Note: Not to be confused with the Bob Martin who represented Austria in this year's Eurovision Song Contest) | "Seulement" | C. Nougaro; J. Walter |
| 7 | Danièle Dupré | 9 | Joss Baselli | "Le Vieux Marin" | Botton |

==== Heat 5 ====
The fifth heat was held on 15 February 1957. In contrast to the other heats, it was directed by Claude Dagues. As the interval act, the winning song from heat 4, "Je m'ballade dans Paname" was performed by Jean-Louis Tristan. Heat 5 was won by the song "La Belle Amour" written by Guy Lafarge (music) and Francis Carco (lyrics).

Heat 5 – 15 February 1957
| First Performance | | Second Performance | | Song | Songwriter(s) | Votes | Place |
| R/O | Artist | R/O | Artist | Song | Songwriter(s) | Votes | Place |
|---|---|---|---|---|---|---|---|
| 1 | Maria Lea | 7 | Christian Borel | "Les Deux Enfants" | J. Solar; Cl. Amy | 9 | 4 |
| 2 | Jacques Esterel | 4 | Instrumental | "Des souris et des chats" | Jacques Esterel; J. Lasry | 15 | 3 |
| 3 | Louis Massis | 6 | Instrumental | "Les Aurochs" | D. Lapeyrère; J-P. Michel | 0 | 5 |
| 5 | Josette Privat | 9 | Instrumental | "La Belle Amour" | Guy Lafarge; Francis Carco | 25 | 1 |
| 8 | Guy Marly | 10 | Les Bass'Harmonistes | "Moi qui vous parle" | Unknown | 17 | 2 |

Heat 5 – Detailed jury voting results
| Song | Strasbourg | Aix-en-Provence | Lens | Nice | Reims | Paris | Total |
|---|---|---|---|---|---|---|---|
| "Les Deux Enfants" | | | 4 | 1 | 4 | | 9 |
| "Des souris et des chats" | | 6 | | 8 | 1 | | 15 |
| "Les Aurochs" | | | | | | | 0 |
| "La Belle Amour" | 1 | 1 | 7 | | 6 | 10 | 25 |
| "Moi qui vous parle" | 10 | 4 | | 2 | | 1 | 17 |

==== Heat 6 ====
The sixth and last heat of Sept villes, une chanson was held on 28 February 1957. In this heat, presenter Robert Beauvais renewed the announcement that the format would be used to select the French entry for the Eurovision Song Contest 1957. In contrast to previous heats with five songs, six songs were presented in this heat. As the interval act, Josette Privat performed the winning song from heat 5, "La Belle Amour". Heat 6 was won by "Quelqu'un viendra demain" and "La Reine du port", finishing both with 15 votes. "La Reine du port" was written by Paul Aliprandi.

Heat 6 – 28 February 1957
| First Performance | | Second Performance | | Song | Songwriter(s) | Votes | Place |
| R/O | Artist | R/O | Artist | Song | Songwriter(s) | Votes | Place |
|---|---|---|---|---|---|---|---|
| 1 | Mistigri | 5 | Instrumental | "La Dondon" | Unknown | 3 | 6 |
| 2 | Félix Marten | 9 | Les Frères Demarny | "Mon Bon Vieux Phono" | F. Bonifay; J. Hourdeaux; J. Claudric | 9 | 5 |
| 3 | Guy Severyns | 7 | Instrumental | "Quelqu'un viendra demain" | J. P. Mottier | 15 | 1 |
| 4 | Victoria Marino | 11 | Miguel Amador | "Villa Bella" | Unknown | 12 | 3 |
| 6 | Lucien Lupi | 10 | Instrumental | "La Reine du port" | Paul Aliprandi | 15 | 1 |
| 8 | René-Louis Lafforgue | 12 | Jacqueline Allard | "Mon Premier Amour" | René-Louis Lafforgue | 10 | 4 |

Heat 6 – Detailed jury voting results
| Song | Strasbourg | Nîmes | Paris | Lyon (Note: The jury of Lyon only distributed 9 votes in this heat. The spokesperson of the Lyon jury announced that two jury members had chosen not to vote because they didn't like any of the songs presented) | Saint-Amand | Nancy | Total |
|---|---|---|---|---|---|---|---|
| "La Dondon" | | | 3 | | | | 3 |
| "Mon Bon Vieux Phono" | 3 | | 2 | 4 | | | 9 |
| "Quelqu'un viendra demain" | 4 | 2 | 2 | 4 | 3 | | 15 |
| "Villa Bella" | | 6 | 1 | | | 5 | 12 |
| "La Reine du port" | 3 | 3 | | | 4 | 5 | 15 |
| "Mon Premier Amour" | 1 | | 3 | 1 | 4 | 1 | 10 |

=== Selection of the French entry ===
Despite having announced Sept villes, une chanson as preselection, RTF finally opted for an internal selection: a separate jury that included Robert Beauvais chose Paule Desjardins as French representative and the song "La Belle Amour" as the French entry. "La Belle Amour" had won the fifth heat of Sept villes, une chanson. It was written by Guy Lafarge (music) and Francis Carco (lyrics).

On 21 February, Deutsches Fernsehen published a press release on the upcoming contest in Frankfurt, saying that Paule Desjardins would sing a song by Guy Lafarge for France. TV listings magazine Radio-Télévision 57 mentioned her as the French representative in its issue of 24 February 1957. Le Franc-Tireur reported on 26 February 1957 that she would sing "La Belle Amour" in Frankfurt.

Official TV listings for the Eurovision Song Contest on 3 March still claimed that the French entry had been chosen in Sept villes, une chanson. Apparently, RTF did not inform television viewers sufficiently ahead of the Eurovision Song Contest: TV listings magazine Télévision Programme Magazine later reported having received numerous letters by angry viewers who criticised RTF for its lack of transparency in the selection and for the last-minute replacement of Josette Privat (who had sung the song in Sept villes, une chanson) with Paule Desjardins. The magazine contacted Robert Beauvais, who had presented all shows and had been involved in the decision. Beauvais stated that RTF wanted a good-looking international star to represent France and that Privat was "young, therefore without experience. Her appearance of a nice urchin [gavroche] could not be suitable." According to Beauvais, RTF first had asked Jacqueline François but since she was not available for the date of the contest, they then turned to Paule Desjardins.

== At Eurovision ==
At the Eurovision Song Contest held on 3 March 1957 in Frankfurt, Paule Desjardins performed eight, following the Germany and preceding Denmark. "La Belle Amour" was conducted by Paul Durand. The song received 17 votes, placing second in a field of ten. It was succeeded as French representative at the 1958 contest by André Claveau, with "Dors mon amour".

Eurovision Song Contest 1957 was broadcast on French television RTF and radio Paris-Inter, on both stations with commentary by Robert Beauvais.

=== Voting ===
Every country had a jury of ten people. Every jury member could give one vote to their favourite song. The French jury included Mony Dalmès, France Roche, Cora Vaucaire, Paul Colin, Maurice Dekobra, Louis Ducreux, Marcepoil, Jean Marsac and François Périer.

Votes awarded to France
| Score | Country |
|---|---|
| 6 votes | Germany |
| 4 votes | Luxembourg |
| 2 votes | Belgium; Denmark; United Kingdom |
| 1 vote | Netherlands |

Votes awarded by France
| Score | Country |
|---|---|
| 6 votes | Germany |
| 4 votes | Netherlands |
