= Eurovision Song Contest 1957 =

International song competition

Coordinates: 50°08′09″N 08°40′33″E

Date and venue
- Final: 3 March 1957
- Venue: Großer Sendesaal des Hessischen Rundfunks; Frankfurt, West Germany

Organisation
- Organiser: European Broadcasting Union (EBU)

Production
- Host broadcaster: ARD (Note: Arbeitsgemeinschaft der öffentlich-rechtlichen Rundfunkanstalten der Bundesrepublik Deutschland – "Working group of public broadcasters of the Federal Republic of Germany") – Hessischer Rundfunk (HR)
- Director: Michael Kehlmann
- Musical director: Willy Berking
- Presenter: Anaid Iplicjian

Participants
- Number of entries: 10
- Debuting countries: Austria; Denmark; United Kingdom
- Participation map: Participating countries

Vote
- Voting system: Ten-member juries in each country; each member gave one vote to their favourite song
- Winning song: Netherlands "Net als toen"

The Eurovision Song Contest 1957, originally known as the Grand Prix Eurovision de la Chanson Européenne 1957 (English: Eurovision Grand Prize of European Song 1957), was the second edition of the Eurovision Song Contest, held on Sunday 3 March 1957 at the Großer Sendesaal des Hessischen Rundfunks in Frankfurt, West Germany, and presented by Anaid Iplicjian. It was organised by the European Broadcasting Union (EBU) and host broadcaster Hessischer Rundfunk (HR) on behalf of ARD.

Broadcasters from ten countries participated in the contest, with Austria, Denmark, and the United Kingdom competing for the first time and joining the original seven participating countries from the first contest in 1956.

The winner of the contest was the Netherlands, with the song "Net als toen" performed by Corry Brokken. This was Brokken's second appearance as a participant, after previously representing the Netherlands in 1956; her victory marked the first of five Dutch wins in the contest as of 2026. France, Denmark, Luxembourg and Germany rounded out the top five.

A number of changes to the rules from the previous year's event were enacted; each country were now represented by only one song, while the voting system received an overhaul, with the results of the voting now conducted on a scoreboard in view of the public to allow the process to be followed by viewers and listeners at home. Jurors were also no longer allowed to vote for the song from their own country.

== Location ==
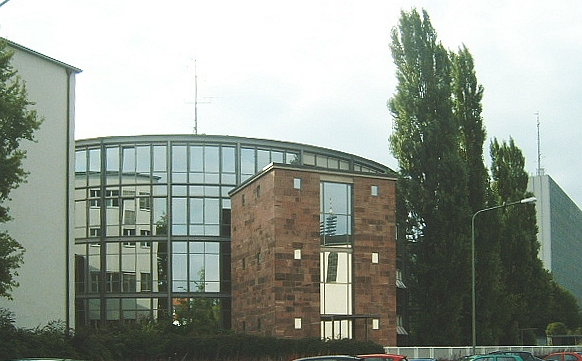
Großer Sendesaal des hessischen Rundfunks, Frankfurt – venue of the 1957 contest

The 1957 contest took place in Frankfurt, West Germany. The selected venue was the Großer Sendesaal des hessischen Rundfunks, a music hall and former broadcasting studio located in the Dornbusch district, and part of the wider Broadcasting House Dornbusch which serves as the headquarters and main broadcasting facility of the German public broadcaster for the state of Hesse, Hessischer Rundfunk (HR). The contest was held in front of an audience of around 400 people.

A new plan for staging the event was invoked ahead of the 1957 contest, with a different broadcaster organising the contest each year, after Switzerland's SRG SSR, which had both hosted the contest and provided the winning entry in 1956, declined to stage it for a second time.

Germany was subsequently selected to host the second edition, after Hans-Otto Grünefeldt, TV program director at HR, offered to organise it on behalf of ARD. Frankfurt was selected as host city as early as June 1956 during an EBU meeting in Italy.

== Participants ==
Eurovision Song Contest 1957 – Participation summaries by country
- Austria; Belgium; Denmark; France; Germany; Italy; Luxembourg; Netherlands; Switzerland; United Kingdom

Ten countries participated in the 1957 contest, with the seven countries which took part in the first contest being joined by Austria, Denmark and the United Kingdom in their first appearances. Austria and Denmark had originally planned to compete in 1956, but missed the cut-off date for entry. Initially, Monaco also figured on the list of participants for 1957, but disappeared from the list by 21 February 1957.

Two of the participating artists, Switzerland's Lys Assia and the Netherlands' Corry Brokken, had previously competed at the 1956 contest. Brokken was one of the two Dutch participants in that year's contest, competing with the song "Voorgoed voorbij", while Assia had performed both of Switzerland's entries, "Das alte Karussell" and "Refrain", the latter of which had won the contest.

Eurovision Song Contest 1957 participants
Country	Broadcaster	Artist	Song	Language	Songwriter(s)	Conductor
Austria	ORF	Bob Martin	"Wohin, kleines Pony?"	German	Kurt Svab; Hans Werner	Carl de Groof
Belgium	NIR	Bobbejaan Schoepen	"Straatdeuntje"	Dutch	Eric Franssen; Harry Frékin	Willy Berking
Denmark	Statsradiofonien	Birthe Wilke and Gustav Winckler	"Skibet skal sejle i nat"	Danish	Erik Fiehn; Poul Sørensen	Kai Mortensen
France	RTF	Paule Desjardins	"La Belle Amour"	French	Francis Carco; Guy Lafarge	Paul Durand
Germany	HR (Note: On behalf of the German public broadcasting consortium ARD)	Margot Hielscher	"Telefon, Telefon"	German	Friedrich Meyer; Ralph Maria Siegel	Willy Berking
Italy	RAI	Nunzio Gallo	"Corde della mia chitarra"	Italian	Giuseppe Fiorelli; Mario Ruccione	Armando Trovajoli
Luxembourg	CLT	Danièle Dupré	"Tant de peine"	French	Jean-Pierre Kemmer; Jacques Taber	Willy Berking
Netherlands	NTS	Corry Brokken	"Net als toen"	Dutch	Willy van Hemert; Guus Jansen	Dolf van der Linden
Switzerland	SRG SSR	Lys Assia	"L'Enfant que j'étais"	French	Émile Gardaz; Géo Voumard	Willy Berking
United Kingdom	BBC	Patricia Bredin	"All"	English	Alan Stranks; Reynell Wreford	Eric Robinson

== Format ==
The contest was organised and broadcast by HR on behalf of ARD, with Michael Kehlmann serving as director and Willy Berking serving as musical director, leading the Tanz- und Unterhaltungsorchester des Hessischen Rundfunks during the event. Its costs for broadcaster HR ranged between 40,000 and 50,000 DM. HR took charge of all financial costs, except costs regarding the individual participants (such as travel and accommodation) and costs regarding the international transmission via the Eurovision network. Each participating delegation was allowed to nominate its own musical director to lead the orchestra during the performance of its country's entry, with the host musical director also conducting for those countries which did not nominate their own conductor.

The stage built in the Großer Sendesaal featured a wooden staircase for the artists and conductors to make their entrance, and a lyre-shaped background for the singers, which should symbolize the history of popular songs since the Middle Ages. The centre of the background contained a removable background, allowing for a different graphic to be used for each nation's performance. The background of the orchestra featured photographs from different European landmarks, such as the Brandenburg Gate, the Colosseum and the Arc de Triomphe. Curtains were used extensively as backgrounds and decorative elements. The entire contest, including the performances and voting, lasted around one hour in total. Held just over nine months after the inaugural contest, the contest date of 3 March remains the earliest date in the calendar year in which the contest has been held.

A number of changes from the rules of the previous year's contest were enacted in 1957. Each country was now permitted to send only one song to compete, as opposed to the maximum of two in 1956. Up to two people were now allowed on stage during the performance, however no other vocal backing was allowed.

A new voting system was introduced, with ten individuals in each country giving one vote to their favourite song. In an additional change to the 1956 rules, jurors were not allowed to vote for the song from their own country. A scoreboard was introduced for the first time, and the voting process was now included as part of the broadcast, rather than conducted in secret as in 1956. The inclusion of a voting sequence allowed for more transparency and helped to create dramatic tension. This new aspect of the contest was inspired by the United Kingdom's Festival of British Popular Songs, which included voting by regional juries and the running total being shown on a scoreboard, a telerecording of which was viewed by EBU organisers. Each jury assembled in their own country to follow the contest on television and were then contacted by telephone by the contest's presenter in order to announce their votes, in a change from 1956 when the jurors were co-located to the contest venue. The participating broadcasters had to make sure that the television sets of the national juries were switched off during the voting to prevent jury members being influenced by other countries' results.

Entries were required to not have been commercially released before 10 February 1957. Each song, as in 1956, was strongly recommended to last no longer than three to three minutes and 30 seconds, however several of the competing entries went beyond this limit. Italy's song, which lasted for five minutes and nine seconds, remains the longest song in the contest's history and, despite heavy protest, was not disqualified. Conversely, the United Kingdom's first entry lasted for one minute and 53 seconds in total, and remained the shortest song to compete in the contest until 2015. Subsequently the restriction on song length was more strictly monitored from 1958 onwards.

Broadcasters were required to submit the lyrics, scores, and an audio recording of their entries by 17 February 1957. Copies of the lyrics as well as their translation into English or French were forwarded to the national juries and the commentators. The draw that determined the running order was held on 2 March 1957.

== Contest overview ==
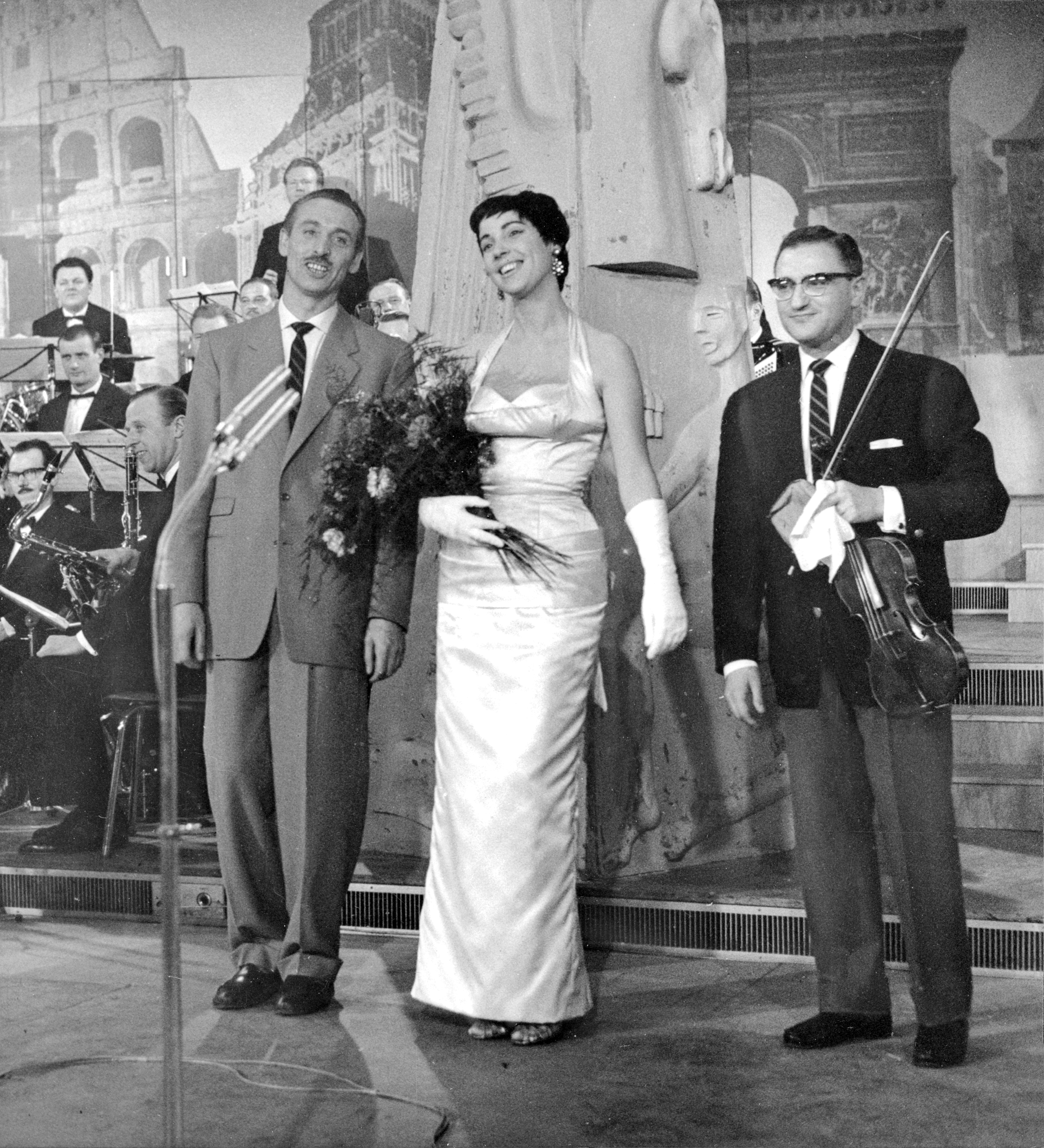
Corry Brokken had previously represented the Netherlands in 1956 before entering the contest again in 1957 and ultimately winning the edition. In this photo, she is pictured with the country's conductor Dolf van der Linden and violinist Sem Nijveen, who was there during her performance, after their victory.

The contest was held on 3 March 1957 at 21:00 (CET) and lasted 1 hour. The event was hosted by German actress Anaid Iplicjian.

The winner was the Netherlands represented by the song "Net als toen", composed by Guus Jansen, written by Willy van Hemert and performed by Corry Brokken. Notable among this year's participants were Denmark's Birthe Wilke and Gustav Winckler, the first duo to compete in the contest, who made an impact with a passionate on-screen kiss at the end of their performance; and Germany's Margot Hielscher, the first Eurovision act to use a prop during their performance, in this instance a telephone.

An award was presented to the winning composer for the first time, taking the form of a medallion, which was awarded at the end of the broadcast by Eberhard Beckmann, director of Hessischer Rundfunk. The medallion had been commissioned by Deutsches Fernsehen and designed by sculptor Hans Mettel. It featured the Eurovision logo and the words "Grand Prix 1957" on one side, and the mythological figure Europa on a bull on the other side.

Results of the Eurovision Song Contest 1957
R/O	Country	Artist	Song	Votes	Place
1	Belgium	Bobbejaan Schoepen	"Straatdeuntje"	5	8
2	Luxembourg	Danièle Dupré	"Tant de peine"	8	4
3	United Kingdom	Patricia Bredin	"All"	6	7
4	Italy	Nunzio Gallo	"Corde della mia chitarra"	7	6
5	Austria	Bob Martin	"Wohin, kleines Pony?"	3	10
6	Netherlands	Corry Brokken	"Net als toen"	31	1
7	Germany	Margot Hielscher	"Telefon, Telefon"	8	4
8	France	Paule Desjardins	"La Belle Amour"	17	2
9	Denmark	Birthe Wilke and Gustav Winckler	"Skibet skal sejle i nat"	10	3
10	Switzerland	Lys Assia	"L'Enfant que j'étais"	5	8

=== Spokespersons ===
Each participating broadcaster appointed a spokesperson who was responsible for announcing the votes for its respective country via telephone. Known spokespersons at the 1957 contest are listed below.

- Netherlands – Siebe van der Zee

== Detailed voting results ==
The announcement of the results from each country was conducted in reverse order to the order in which each country performed.

Detailed voting results of the Eurovision Song Contest 1957
		Total score	Switzerland	Denmark	France	Germany	Netherlands	Austria	Italy	United Kingdom	Luxembourg	Belgium
Contestants	Belgium	5	1	2		2						
Contestants	Luxembourg	8						3	4	1		
Contestants	United Kingdom	6	2				1	1			1	1
Contestants	Italy	7		1			2			2	1	1
Contestants	Austria	3					1			2		
Contestants	Netherlands	31	7	3	4	1		6	1	1	3	5
Contestants	Germany	8			6				1			1
Contestants	France	17		2		6	1			2	4	2
Contestants	Denmark	10					5		3	2		
Contestants	Switzerland	5		2		1			1		1	

== Broadcasts ==
Broadcasters competing in the event were required to relay the contest via its networks; non-participating EBU member broadcasters were also able to relay the contest. In total, the contest was broadcast in 12 countries. Broadcasters were able to send commentators to provide coverage of the contest in their own native language and to relay information about the artists and songs to their television viewers. Known details on the broadcasts in each country, including the specific broadcasting stations and commentators are shown in the tables below.

The 1957 contest is the earliest edition to exist in full in the EBU's archives, as the 1956 edition has survived solely through audio recordings, with some missing segments, and limited video footage of the winning reprise performance through newsreel and other recordings. Although the number of households which had access to a television in Europe continued to grow, this edition, as in the case of the 1956 contest, was still mainly accessed by spectators via radio.

Broadcasters and commentators in participating countries
Country	Broadcaster	Channel(s)	Commentator(s)	Ref.
Austria	ORF	ORF		
Belgium	NIR/INR	NIR, Brussel Vlaams		
Belgium	NIR/INR	INR	Robert Beauvais	
Denmark	Statsradiofonien	Statsradiofonien TV, Program 2	Svend Pedersen	
France	RTF	RTF, Paris-Inter	Robert Beauvais	
Germany	ARD	Deutsches Fernsehen	No commentator	
Germany	HR	Zweites Programm		
Germany	WDR	UKW West (Note: Delayed broadcast on 29 April 1957 at 21:15 (CET))		
Italy	RAI	RAI Televisione	Adriana Alberti	
Italy	RAI	Secondo Programma		
Luxembourg	CLT	Télé-Luxembourg	Robert Beauvais	
Netherlands	NTS	NTS	Piet te Nuyl Jr.	
Switzerland	SRG SSR	SRG, Radio Beromünster		
Switzerland	SRG SSR	TSR	Robert Beauvais	
Switzerland	SRG SSR	Radio Sottens		
Switzerland	SRG SSR	Radio Monte Ceneri		
United Kingdom	BBC	BBC Television Service	Berkeley Smith	

Broadcasters and commentators in non-participating countries
Country	Broadcaster	Channel(s)	Commentator(s)	Ref.
Monaco	Télé Monte-Carlo		Robert Beauvais	
Monaco	Radio Monte-Carlo (Note: Delayed broadcast on 3 March 1957 at 22:20 (CET))			
Sweden	Radiotjänst	Sveriges TV (Göteborg)	Nils Linnman	

== Notes and references ==
=== Bibliography ===
- "Internationaler Schlager- und Chansonwettbewerb" (Press release) (in German). Hamburg, West Germany: ARD. Deutsches Fernsehen. ARD-Pressedienst. 21 February 1957. OCLC 183304021.
- Grand Prix Eurovision de la Chanson Européenne 1957. Programm [Eurovision Grand Prix for European Song 1957 Programme] (in German, English, and French), Frankfurt, West Germany: Hessischer Rundfunk (HR), 1957, OCLC 72005371
- Gambaccini, Paul; Rice, Jonathan; Brown, Tony (1999). The Complete Eurovision Song Contest Companion 1999. London: Pavilion Books. ISBN 978-1-86205-243-7. OCLC 60223350.
- Gauja, Anika (2019). "Europe: Start Voting Now! Democracy, Participation and Diversity in the Eurovision Song Contest". In Kalman, Julie; Wellings, Ben; Jacotine, Keshia (eds.). Eurovisions: Identity and the International Politics of the Eurovision Song Contest since 1956. Singapore: Palgrave Macmillan. pp. 203–204. doi:10.1007/978-981-13-9427-0_10. ISBN 978-981-13-9426-3. OCLC 1128479336.
- O'Connor, John Kennedy (2010). The Eurovision Song Contest: The Official History (2nd ed.). London, United Kingdom: Carlton Books. ISBN 978-1-84732-521-1.
- Roxburgh, Gordon (2012). Songs for Europe: The United Kingdom at the Eurovision Song Contest. Vol. One: The 1950s and 1960s. Prestatyn, United Kingdom: Telos Publishing. ISBN 978-1-84583-065-6.
- Thorsson, Leif; Verhage, Martin (2006). Melodifestivalen genom tiderna : de svenska uttagningarna och internationella finalerna [Melodifestivalen through the ages: the Swedish selections and international finals] (in Swedish). Stockholm, Sweden: Premium Publishing. ISBN 91-89136-29-2.
