= Raquel Rastenni =

Danish-Russian singer (1915–1998)

- Raquel Rastenni at the Eurovision Song Contest 1958

Background information
- Born: Anna Rachel Rastén; 21 August 1915; Copenhagen, Denmark
- Died: 17 August 1998 (aged 82) Skodsborg, Sjælland, Denmark
- Occupation: singer

Raquel Rastenni (21 August 1915 – 17 August 1998), born Anna Rachel Rastén, was a Danish-Russian singer. She was born in Copenhagen, and grew up in an apartment in the poor part of the city. Her Jewish parents immigrated to Denmark from Russia at the start of the 20th century. Her father was a tailor, and her mother was a seamstress.

She started her career as a dancer in the Helsingør Revue in 1936. She debuted as a singer in 1938 by being broadcast on radio. She sang with various orchestras through the early 1940s and in 1940 formed her own swing trio. That same year her first record was released. She also toured during these years in Sweden.

As a Jew, she fled Denmark in October 1943 along with her family, as the country had come under Nazi occupation. She spent the rest of the war years in Sweden where she continued having great success with her career, performing with orchestras and in cabarets and varieties. Her jazz singing style has been compared to that of Ella Fitzgerald.

She returned to Denmark in 1945 and became Denmark's leading female ballad singer. Among her successes were Vovsen i vinduet ("(How Much Is) That Doggie in the Window?") in 1953 and Heksedansen ("The Witch Dance") in 1960. Her best-selling song was Hele ugen alene ("Seven lonely days") in 1953, which sold over 120,000 copies. She was the first artist in Denmark to earn a gold record.

In addition to her Danish language recordings, she recorded also in Swedish, Yiddish and Hebrew.

After qualifying in the Dansk Melodi Grand Prix to represent Denmark at the Eurovision Song Contest, she participated in Eurovision Song Contest 1958, where she sang Jeg rev et blad ud af min Dagbog] (I Tore A Page Out Of My Diary). She ranked number 8.

She participated once more in the Danish Melodi Grand Prix, singing a duet with Grethe Sønck entitled Hjemme hos os ("At our home").

In the late 1980s, she retired from public life. She died in Skodsborg in the northern part of Sjælland at the age of 82.

Preceded by Birthe Wilke & Gustav Winckler with Skibet skal sejle i nat	Denmark in the Eurovision Song Contest; 1958	Succeeded by Birthe Wilke with Uh, jeg ville ønske jeg var dig
