= Austria in the Eurovision Song Contest 1957 =

- Eurovision Song Contest 1957
- Participating broadcaster: Österreichischer Rundfunk (ORF)
- Country: Austria
- Selection process: Chansons aus Österreich
- Selection date: 6 February 1957

Competing entry
- Song: "Wohin, kleines Pony?"
- Artist: Bob Martin
- Songwriters: Kurt Svab; Hans Werner

Placement
- Final result: 10th, 3 votes

Participation chronology

Austria was represented at the Eurovision Song Contest 1957 with the song "Wohin, kleines Pony?", written by Kurt Svab and Hans Werner, and performed by Bob Martin. The Austrian participating broadcaster, Österreichischer Rundfunk (ORF), selected its entry through a national final. This was the first-ever entry from Austria in the Eurovision Song Contest.

== Before Eurovision ==
=== Chansons aus Österreich ===
Broadcaster Österreichischer Rundfunk (ORF) held a national final called Chansons aus Österreich. It took place at the Wiener Stadttheater in Vienna on 6 February 1957 at 20:00 CET (21:00 UTC) and was broadcast live on Österreichisches Fernsehen with a scheduled duration of two hours. The program was presented by Max Lustig. Ten entries competed. They were presented by Erni Bieler, Elfie Friedrich, Bob Martin, Axel Sandy and Horst Winter. The artists were accompanied by the Österreichisches Rundfunk-Tanzorchester under the musical direction of Carl de Groof.

As the interval act, composer Ludwig Gruber sang his own Wienerlied "Mei Muatterl war a Wienerin", accompanied by the Mozart Boys' Choir.

The winner was decided by a jury composed by three music and entertainment professionals present at the venue (Max Schönherr, Marcel Prawy, Johanna Matz), three jurors giving their votes via telephone from Salzburg, Graz, and Linz, as well as by the use of a sound level meter measuring the applause from the audience.

The winning song was "Wohin, kleines Pony?" (Note: Also titled "Wohin, kleines Pony, wollen wir reiten?" in the Austrian press.) sung by Bob Martin, with music by Kurt Svab and lyrics by Kurt Svab and Hans Werner.

Chansons aus Österreich – 6 February 1957
Song	Composer	Lyricist	Points	Place
"Bitte, sprich nicht so viel"	Peter Wehle	Gerhard Bronner	42	3
"Das Lied der Liebe"	Günther Leopold	Kurt Werner	32	9
"Die Liebe kommt, die Liebe geht"	Herbert Seiter	Karin Bognar	39	7
"Es war ein Tag voll Lerchenschlag"	Hanne Renz	Siegfried Guggenberger	34	8
"Jeder Tag mit dir ist ein Feiertag"	Friedl Althaller	Emil Breisach	43	2
"Märchen gab's in allen Zeiten"	Jeff Palme		42	3
"Sing' ein Lied, Troubadour"	Gustav Zelibor	Kurt Nachmann	32	9
"Wer weiß, ob morgen die Welt noch steht"	Norbert Pawlicki		42	3
"Wohin, kleines Pony?"	Kurt Svab	Kurt Svab; Hans Werner	53	1
"Wüstensand, ewiger Wüstensand"	Herbert Seiter		42	3

== At Eurovision ==
At the Eurovision Song Contest held on 3 March 1957 in Frankfurt, Bob Martin performed fifth, following Italy and preceding Netherlands. "Wohin, kleines Pony?" was conducted by Carl de Groof. The song received 3 votes, placing last in a field of ten. Bob Martin was succeeded as Austrian representative at the 1958 contest by "Die ganze Welt braucht Liebe" performed by Liane Augustin.

Eurovision Song Contest 1957 was broadcast in Austria on Österreichisches Fernsehen.

Austria's choice of sending "Wohin, kleines Pony?" for its first participation and Bob Martin's performance have been interpreted as a strategy of conveying an "infantilised" image of the country in order to discharge it from responsibilities associated with its Nazi history by likening the country to a harmless, little pony.

=== Voting ===
Every participating broadcaster assembled a jury of ten people. Every jury member could give one vote to their favourite song, except the one representing its country.

Votes awarded to Austria
Score	Country
2 votes	United Kingdom
1 vote	Netherlands

Votes awarded by Austria
Score	Country
6 votes	Netherlands
3 votes	Luxembourg
1 vote	United Kingdom
