= Corde della mia chitarra =

1957 song by both Nunzio Gallo and Claudio Villa

Single by Nunzio Gallo
- Language: Italian
- B-side: "Non Ti Ricordi Piu'"
- Released: 1957
- Label: Odeon
- Composer: Mario Ruccione
- Lyricist: Giuseppe Fiorelli

Eurovision Song Contest 1957 entry
- Country: Italy
- Artist: Nunzio Gallo
- With: Piero Gozo
- Language: Italian
- Composer: Mario Ruccione
- Lyricist: Giuseppe Fiorelli
- Conductor: Armando Trovajoli

Finals performance
- Final result: 6th
- Final points: 7

Entry chronology
- ◄ "Amami se vuoi" (1956)
- "Nel blu dipinto di blu" (1958) ►

"Corde della mia chitarra"

Single by Claudio Villa
- Language: Italian
- B-side: "Cancello Tra Le Rose"
- Released: 1957
- Label: Cetra
- Composer: Mario Ruccione
- Lyricist: Giuseppe Fiorelli

"Corde della mia chitarra" ("Strings of my guitar") is a song recorded by both Italian singers Nunzio Gallo and Claudio Villa, with music composed by Mario Ruccione and Italian lyrics written by Giuseppe Fiorelli. It won the Sanremo Music Festival 1957 where it was performed by both singers and represented Italy in the Eurovision Song Contest 1957 performed by Gallo. The song is the longest in Eurovision's history. Both original recordings are ranked among the top 100 most successful songs in Italy in 1957.

== Background ==
=== Conception ===
"Corde della mia chitarra" was composed by Mario Ruccione with Italian lyrics by Giuseppe Fiorelli. With guitar accompaniment and with a vocal ranging between light and classical opera styles, the song is a ballad in the chanson style as well as the opera tones popular in Italy and Europe in the 1950s. The singer sings of his mixed feelings at seeing a former lover and realising that she is no longer interested in him. He asks the strings of his guitar to play for him alone, since she has no interest in their music anymore.

=== Sanremo ===
On 7–9 February 1957, "Corde della mia chitarra" competed in the 7th edition of the Sanremo Music Festival performed by both Nunzio Gallo and Claudio Villa, and winning the competition. As the festival was used by Radiotelevisione italiana (RAI) to select its song and performer for the 2nd edition of the Eurovision Song Contest, the song became the Italian entry for the contest, with Gallo chosen as the performer.

=== Eurovision ===
On 3 March 1957, the Eurovision Song Contest was held at the Großer Sendesaal des hessischen Rundfunks in Frankfurt hosted by Hessischer Rundfunk (HR) on behalf of ARD and broadcast live throughout the continent. Gallo performed "Corde della mia chitarra" fourth on the evening, following the United Kingdom's "All" by Patricia Bredin and preceding Austria's "Wohin, kleines Pony?" by Bob Martin. Armando Trovajoli conducted the event's orchestra in the Italian entry performance that featured live guitar accompaniment by Piero Gozo. The song is the longest in the contest's history as it runs for 5 minutes and 9 seconds.

At the close of voting, it had received 7 points, placing it sixth in a field of ten. It was succeeded as Italian representative at the 1958 contest by "Nel blu dipinto di blu" by Domenico Modugno.

=== Aftermath ===
Following this contest, and due to this entry's length, the rule governing the length of entries was tightened to require them to be no longer than 3.5 minutes initially and 3 minutes exactly later.

== Charts ==
According to the data calculated at "Hit Parade Italia" which presents weekly and top 100 yearly positions for a mix of both Italian and international songs, the version by Gallo is ranked #69 and the version by Villa the #38 most successful singles in Italy in 1957.
