= Nunzio Gallo =

Italian singer (1928–2008)

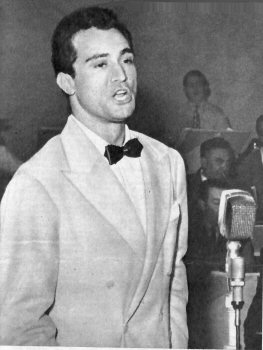
- Gallo in 1956

Background information
- Born: March 25, 1928; Naples, Kingdom of Italy
- Died: February 22, 2008 (aged 79) Telese Terme, Italy
- Occupation: singer

Nunzio Gallo (25 March 1928 – 22 February 2008) was an Italian singer and actor from Naples. After winning the Sanremo Music Festival 1957 alongside Claudio Villa, he was chosen to represent his country in the Eurovision Song Contest 1957 with their winning entry "Corde della mia chitarra", ultimately coming 6th. At 5:09, the song is known for being the longest song ever performed at Eurovision, before the new rules imposing the 3-minute length limit came into place. As an actor, Gallo appeared in over 20 films.

Gallo died on 22 February 2008 in Telese Terme, following a severe brain haemorrhage he had suffered in September 2007.

He was the father of actor and singer Massimiliano Gallo.

Preceded by Franca Raimondi with "Aprite le finestre" Tonina Torrielli with "Amami se vuoi"	Italy in the Eurovision Song Contest; 1957	Succeeded by Domenico Modugno with "Nel blu, dipinto di blu"
