= United Kingdom in the Eurovision Song Contest 1957 =

- Eurovision Song Contest 1957
- Participating broadcaster: British Broadcasting Corporation (BBC)
- Country: United Kingdom
- Selection process: Song: Festival of British Popular Songs; Artist: Internal selection
- Selection date: 12 February 1957

Competing entry
- Song: "All"
- Artist: Patricia Bredin
- Songwriters: Reynell Wreford; Alan Stranks

Placement
- Final result: 7th, 6 votes

Participation chronology

The United Kingdom was represented at the Eurovision Song Contest 1957 with the song "All", composed by Reynell Wreford, with lyrics by Alan Stranks, and performed by Patricia Bredin. The British participating broadcaster, the British Broadcasting Corporation (BBC), selected its entry through a national final, the second edition of Festival of British Popular Songs and, subsequently, the performer internally once the national final was over. This was the first-ever entry from the United Kingdom in the Eurovision Song Contest, and the first-ever entry performed in English in the contest.

== Before Eurovision ==
=== Festival of British Popular Songs 1957 ===
The United Kingdom was represented in the Eurovision Song Contest for the first time in 1957. The British Broadcasting Corporation (BBC) did not participate in the inaugural contest in 1956, as it had created its own contest, the Festival of British Popular Songs, aspects of which influenced the 1957 Eurovision contest.

The Festival of British Popular Songs 1957 served as the selection for the United Kingdom's entry for the Eurovision Song Contest 1957. All British music publishing companies were invited to submit each one song for the national selection. Around 70 to 80 songs were reportedly submitted. A jury consisting of Jack Payne, Harry S. Pepper, Cyril Stapleton, Walter Ridley and Frank Lee met in December 1956 to select the competing entries of the live shows. The interpreting artists were chosen separately by the BBC production team.

The Festival of British Popular Songs 1957 consisted of three semi finals and a grand final. All shows took place in the King's Theatre, Hammersmith (West London). They were produced by Francis Essex. The presenter was David Jacobs, who would host many other British national finals the following years. Since the Festival of British Popular Songs 1956 was judged to be lacking effectiveness because it stretched over several months, it was decided that the 1957 edition would consist of weekly shows.

Six songs competed in each semi-final. The songs were scored by ten regional juries, each consisting of twelve members of the general public. Each juror awarded one vote to their favourite song. Two songs in each heat advanced to the national final.

==== Semi-finals ====
The first semi-final took place on 22 January 1957 at 19:45 GMT. The artists were accompanied by the Bill McGuffie Quintet and an orchestra under the musical direction of Eric Robinson. For the interval, Dennis Lotis performed "Everybody Fall in Love With Someone", the winning song of the Festival of British Popular Songs 1956. The ten regional juries in the first semi-final were from the cities of Birmingham, Aberdeen, Cardiff, Newcastle, Belfast, Manchester, Bangor, Bristol, Glasgow and London. The broadcast was watched by 6.8 million viewers in the United Kingdom.

Semi-final 1 – 22 January 1957
First performance		Second performance		Song	Songwriter(s)	Place
R/O	Artist 1	R/O	Artist 2	Song	Songwriter(s)	Place
1	The Keynotes	5	Lita Roza and Dennis Lotis	"April Heart"	John Watson	—N/a
2	Dennis Lotis	8	The Keynotes	"Seven"	Peter Hart; Christopher Richardson	2
3	Marion Ryan	No second performance		"The Teenage Waltz"	Tony Osbourne	—N/a
4	John Hanson	6	Janie Marden	"There's a Place Called Paradise"	Judy Reynolds; Harry New	—N/a
7	Marion Ryan	10	John Hanson	"Turn Around and Face the Sun"	Cliff Adams; Robert Brown; George Elrick	—N/a
9	Lita Roza	No second performance		"The Way It Goes"	Tony Osbourne	1

The second semi-final took place on 29 January 1957 at 21:00 GMT. The artists were accompanied by the Frank Weir Quintet as well as by an orchestra conducted by Stanley Black. For the interval act, the Frank Weir Quartet performed "The Way It Goes", the winning song from the first heat. The ten regional juries in the second semi-final were from the cities of Manchester, Leeds, Edinburgh, Swansea, Bangor, Plymouth, Bristol, Belfast, Nottingham and London. 7.1 million viewers in the United Kingdom watched the programme.

Semi-final 2 – 29 January 1957
First performance		Second performance		Song	Songwriter(s)	Place
R/O	Artist 1	R/O	Artist 2	Song	Songwriter(s)	Place
1	Bryan Johnson	3	Lorrae Desmond	"You Can't Take It With You"	Harold Elton Box; Desmond Cox; Ralph Butler	—N/a
2	Edna Savage	10	Jill Day	"Once"	Barbara Killalee	1
4	Bryan Johnson	11	Lorrae Desmond	"Red Wine and Ruby Lips"	Derek New; Geoffrey Venis	—N/a
5	Ronnie Hilton	7	Frank Horrox	"For Your Love"	Robert Kingston; Ronald Bridges; Ralph Ruvin	2
6	Jill Day	8	Edna Savage and Ronnie Hilton	"A Girl, a Boy and a Bike"	Peter Hart	—N/a
9	Frank Weir	No second performance		"Lonely Wind"	Gordon Ross	—N/a

The third semi-final took place on 5 February 1957 at 19:45 GMT. The artists were accompanied by the Malcolm Lockyer Quartet as well as by an orchestra under the musical direction of Frank Chacksfield. The ten regional juries in semi-final 3 were from the cities of Swansea, Glasgow, Plymouth, Leeds, Belfast, Birmingham, Bristol, Aberdeen, Cardiff and London. The programme was watched by 7.1 million viewers. The song "Don't Cry Little Doll" was subject to controversy since the songwriters had sold the copyright to a different music publisher before and it was not clear whether the song had been published before. Finally, it turned out that the song had only been on a test pressing and the BBC allowed the song to compete in the final.

Semi-final 3 – 5 February 1957
First performance		Second performance		Song	Songwriter(s)	Place
R/O	Artist 1	R/O	Artist 2	Song	Songwriter(s)	Place
1	The Ken-Tones	11	Shirley Eaton and Bill Maynard	"Choose a Cosy Corner"	John Dunbar; Leslie Herbert Osborne	—N/a
2	Lee Lawrence	7	Carole Carr	"How Right You Were"	Harold Geller; Richard Frank; Dr T. Richardson	—N/a
3	Shirley Eaton	9	Patricia Bredin	"Hurdy Gurdy Joe"	Tommie Connor	—N/a
4	The Ken-Tones	8	Bill Maynard	"Don't Cry Little Doll"	Ron Grainer; David Dearlove	2
5	Patricia Bredin	10	Malcolm Lockyer	"All"	Reynell Wreford; Alan Stranks	1
6	George Mitchell Singers	No second performance		"The Sycamore Tree"	Hubert Gregg	—N/a

==== Final ====
The final of the Festival of British Popular Songs 1957 was held on 12 February 1957 at 19:45 GMT. The artists were accompanied by an orchestra under the musical direction of three different conductors: The performances of "Don't Cry Little Doll" and "All" were conducted by Frank Chacksfield, "Once" and "For Your Love" were conducted by Stanley Black, "Seven" and "The Way It Goes" by Eric Robinson so that all songs in the final were conducted by the same conductor as in their respective semi-final.

The regional juries for the final were from the cities of Belfast, Newcastle, Bangor, Edinburgh, Nottingham, Cardiff, Birmingham, Glasgow, Manchester and London. A cup was presented to the winning composer, Reynell Wreford. The broadcast was watched by 7.5 million viewers in the United Kingdom.

Final – 12 February 1957
First performance		Second performance		Song	Songwriter(s)	Votes	Place
R/O	Artist 1	R/O	Artist 2	Song	Songwriter(s)	Votes	Place
1	The Ken-Tones	5	Bill Maynard	"Don't Cry Little Doll"	Ron Grainer; David Dearlove	14	4
2	Pauline Shepherd	6	Carole Carr	"Once"	Barbara Killalee	23	2
3	Denis Lotis	9	The Keynotes	"Seven"	Peter Hart; Christopher Richardson	13	5
4	Malcolm Lockyer	8	Patricia Bredin	"All"	Reynell Wreford; Alan Stranks	39	1
7	Ronnie Hilton	11	Alan Bristow	"For Your Love"	Robert Kingston; Ronald Bridges; Ralph Ruvin	13	5
10	Lita Roza	No second performance		"The Way It Goes"	Tony Osborne	18	3

=== Recordings ===
Patricia Bredin never recorded the winning song "All" but a recording of the song was released by English singer Robert Earl. In addition, an instrumental version by Victor Sylvester as a single reached number 14 in the sheet music charts.

== At Eurovision ==
Patricia Bredin performed third at the Eurovision Song Contest 1957, following Luxembourg and preceding Italy. The conductor was Eric Robinson. At a length of 1:52 minutes, it was the shortest entry in the history of the contest until Finland in 2015 as well as the first song to be performed in English. The song also turned out to perform right before Italy's "Corde della mia chitarra", the longest entry in the history of the contest at 5:09 minutes.

At the close of voting, the United Kingdom had received six votes and finished seventh among the ten countries, despite votes from five of the nine other countries.

Eurovision Song Contest 1957 was broadcast in the United Kingdom on BBC Television Service with commentary by Berkeley Smith. The programme was watched by 6.8 million viewers in the United Kingdom.

=== Voting ===
Each participating broadcaster assembled a ten-member jury panel. Every juror could give one vote to their favourite song. The United Kingdom's jury members were chosen from different regions in order to generate a more representative result. These jury members were: Mrs J. Woods (London), James McPhee (Glasgow), Russell Alexander (Newcastle), Mr C. Butland (Bristol), Mrs Smith (Cardiff), Mr D. Armstrong (Belfast), Mrs K. Beardmore, Mr W. E. Bratton (Nottingham), Shelagh Holden (Manchester), and Mrs D. L. Sissons (Leeds).

Votes awarded to the United Kingdom
Score	Country
2 votes	Switzerland
1 vote	Austria; Belgium; Luxembourg; Netherlands

Votes awarded by the United Kingdom
Score	Country
2 votes	Austria; Denmark; France; Italy
1 vote	Luxembourg; Netherlands

== Bibliography ==
- Roxburgh, Gordon (2012). Songs for Europe: The United Kingdom at the Eurovision Song Contest. Vol. One: The 1950s and 1960s. Prestatyn, United Kingdom: Telos Publishing. ISBN 978-1-84583-065-6.
