= Denmark in the Eurovision Song Contest 1957 =

- Eurovision Song Contest 1957
- Participating broadcaster: Statsradiofonien
- Country: Denmark
- Selection process: Dansk Melodi Grand Prix 1957
- Selection date: 17 February 1957

Competing entry
- Song: "Skibet skal sejle i nat"
- Artist: Birthe Wilke and Gustav Winckler
- Songwriters: Erik Fiehn; Poul Sørensen

Placement
- Final result: 3rd, 10 votes

Participation chronology

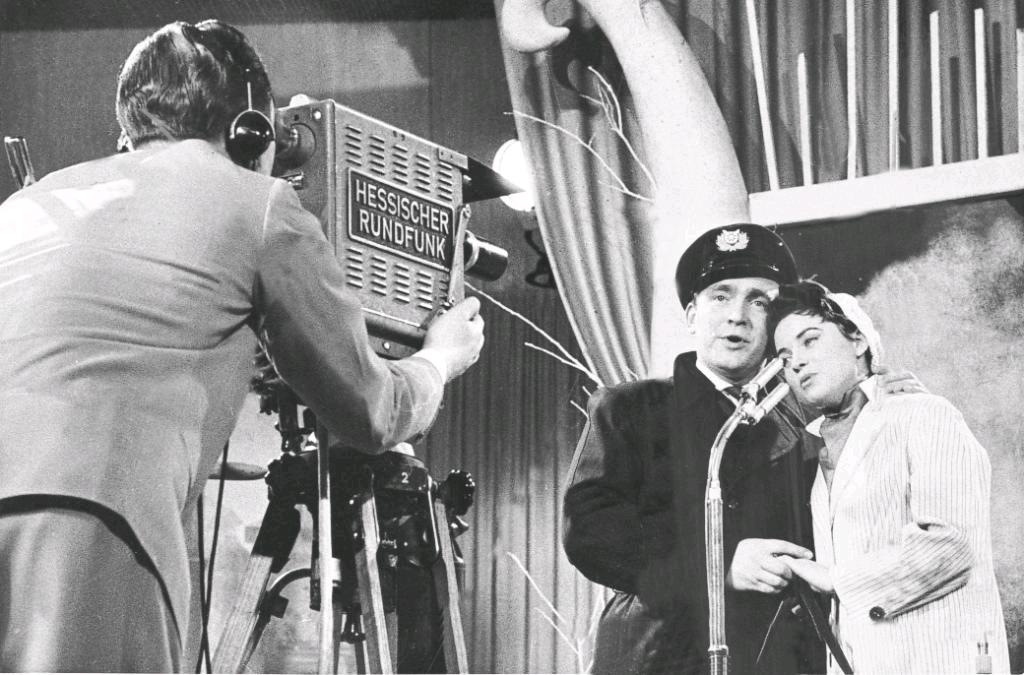

Denmark was represented at the Eurovision Song Contest 1957 with the song "Skibet skal sejle i nat", composed by Erik Fiehn, with lyrics by Poul Sørensen, and performed by Birthe Wilke and Gustav Winckler. The Danish participating broadcaster, Statsradiofonien, organised the Dansk Melodi Grand Prix 1957 in order to select its entry for the contest. This was the first-ever entry from Denmark in the Eurovision Song Contest, and the first-ever entry performed in Danish in the contest.

Statsradiofonien had wanted to take part in the first contest in 1956 but registered too late.

== Before Eurovision ==
For the Danish selection, Statsradiofonien established the rules in cooperation with the songwriters associations Dansk Komponist Forening and Dansk Revyforfatter- og Komponist-forbund. On 3 January 1957, the broadcaster invited these associations as well as the Dansk Forfatterforening to submit songs for the Danish selection. A call for submission was also published in the press, with the deadline being 28 January 1957. 117 songs were submitted. A jury consisting of Flemming Weis (Dansk Komponist Forening), Axel Thingsted (Dansk Revyforfatter- og Komponist-forbund), Kai Mortensen (Statsradiofonien) and Mogens Kilde (Statsradiofonien) chose six of them for the national final.

=== Melodi Grand Prix ===
Statsradiofonien held its national final titled Melodi Grand Prix at Radiohuset in Copenhagen on 17 February 1957 at 20:20 CET (19:20 UTC). It was broadcast on Statsradiofonien Fjernsyn and also on Program 2. The program was directed by Eigil Molsø and hosted by Sejr Volmer-Sørensen.

The entries were performed by Birthe Wilke and Gustav Winckler. Both performed two songs as soloists and they also performed two songs as a duo. The artists were accompanied by Statsradiofonien's danseorkestret under the direction of Kai Mortensen. The songs were arranged by Arne Lamberth, Poul Clemensen and Otto Francker. An expert jury of ten people watching the show from a separated studio selected the winning song. The jury included Peter Deutsch, Flemming Weis, Jens Warny, Harald Krebs, Axel Thingsted, Poul Hamburger, Susanne Palsbo, Mogens Kilde, Kay Rostgaard-Frøhne, and Jørgen Vibe.

Jury president Susanne Palsbo announced the result. The songwriters of the winning song were only revealed at the end of the program. Only the top two were announced, which turned out to be the two duets. "Skibet skal sejle i nat", written by Erik Fiehn and with lyrics by Poul Sørensen, was the overall winner and would become the first Danish entry in the Eurovision Song Contest.

Melodi Grand Prix - 17 February 1957
R/O	Artist	Song	Composer	Lyricist	Place
1	Birthe Wilke and Gustav Winckler	"Skibet skal sejle i nat"	Erik Fiehn	Poul Sørensen	1
2	Birthe Wilke	"Længslernes veje"	Eric Christiansen	Carl Andersen	Unknown
3	Gustav Winckler	"Fata Morgana"	Sophus Brandsholt	Sophus Brandsholt; Poul Christoffersen	Unknown
4	Birthe Wilke	"Chanson ordinaire"	Otto Francker	Unknown	Unknown
5	Gustav Winckler	"Hele verden venter på en vår"	Eric Christiansen	Anni Weimar	Unknown
6	Birthe Wilke and Gustav Winckler	"Kærlighedens cocktail"	Otto Lington	Carl Andersen	2

=== Releases ===
"Skibet skal sejle i nat" was recorded and released on an EP of the same title, with the runner-up entry "Kærlighedens cocktail" also included. After the contest, Gustav Winkler has recorded a German version of the song ("Das Schiff geht in See heute Nacht") with Bibi Johns. Winkler himself appeared as Gunnar Winkler on this record. From the other songs of the national final, Winkler also recorded "Hele verden venter på en vår".

== At Eurovision ==
Denmark was the first Nordic country in the competition. For the Eurovision Song Contest in Frankfurt, the lyrics were shortened in order to fit into the maximum duration of three and a half minutes recommended by the rules. The Danish entry was visually one of the most impressive ones that year: to illustrate the content of the song Winkler was dressed up as a naval captain and Wilke wore a raincoat with a purse in her hand. Furthermore, a tar vat was brought on stage to create a harbour atmosphere. A characteristic of the song is the bass clarinet playing low notes, imitating a ship's foghorn.

The Danish entry was performed ninth on the night, following France and preceding Switzerland. At the close of voting, Denmark had received ten votes in total, placing the country third among the ten participants.

The contest was televised on Statsradiofonien TV and on radio station Program 2, both with commentary by Svend Pedersen.

=== Kiss ===
The performance is famous for the kiss the duo exchanged at the end of the song. The kiss lasted longer than planned, due to a stagehand omitting to signal for it to end. While some consider the kiss to have been a scandal at the time, speculating that the juries in Catholic countries downvoted the song, there doesn't seem to be any evidence for these claims: The Italian jury awarded Denmark three of its ten votes. The local newspaper Frankfurter Rundschau wrote that the Danish performance was "beautifully staged". French Catholic newspaper La Croix thought the performance had been the best interpretation of all songs of the night.

=== Voting ===
Every participating broadcaster assembled a jury of ten people. Every jury member could give one vote to his or her favourite song. The Danish jury comprised the same ten members as for the national final.

Votes awarded to Denmark
Score	Country
5 votes	Netherlands
3 votes	Italy
2 votes	United Kingdom

Votes awarded by Denmark
Score	Country
3 votes	Netherlands
2 votes	Belgium; France; Switzerland
1 votes	Italy
