= 1957 in Denmark =

- Decades: 1930s; 1940s; 1950s; 1960s; 1970s
- See also: Other events of 1957; List of years in Denmark

Events from the year 1957 in Denmark.

== Incumbents ==
- Monarch – Frederik IX
- Prime minister – H. C. Hansen

== Events ==
- 3 March - Denmark places third in Eurovision Song Contest

== Sports ==
=== Badminton ===
- 20–25 March – All England Badminton Championships
  - Anni Hammergaard Hansen and Kirsten Thorndahl win gold in Women's Doubles
- Finn Kobberø and Kirsten Thorndahl win gold in Mixed Doubles.

=== Football ===
- 28 April – AGF wins the 1956–57 Danish Cup by defeating Esbjerg fB 2–0 in the final.

=== Date unknown ===
- Fritz Pfenninger (SUI) and Jean Roth (SUI) win the Six Days of Copenhagen six-day track cycling race.

== Births ==
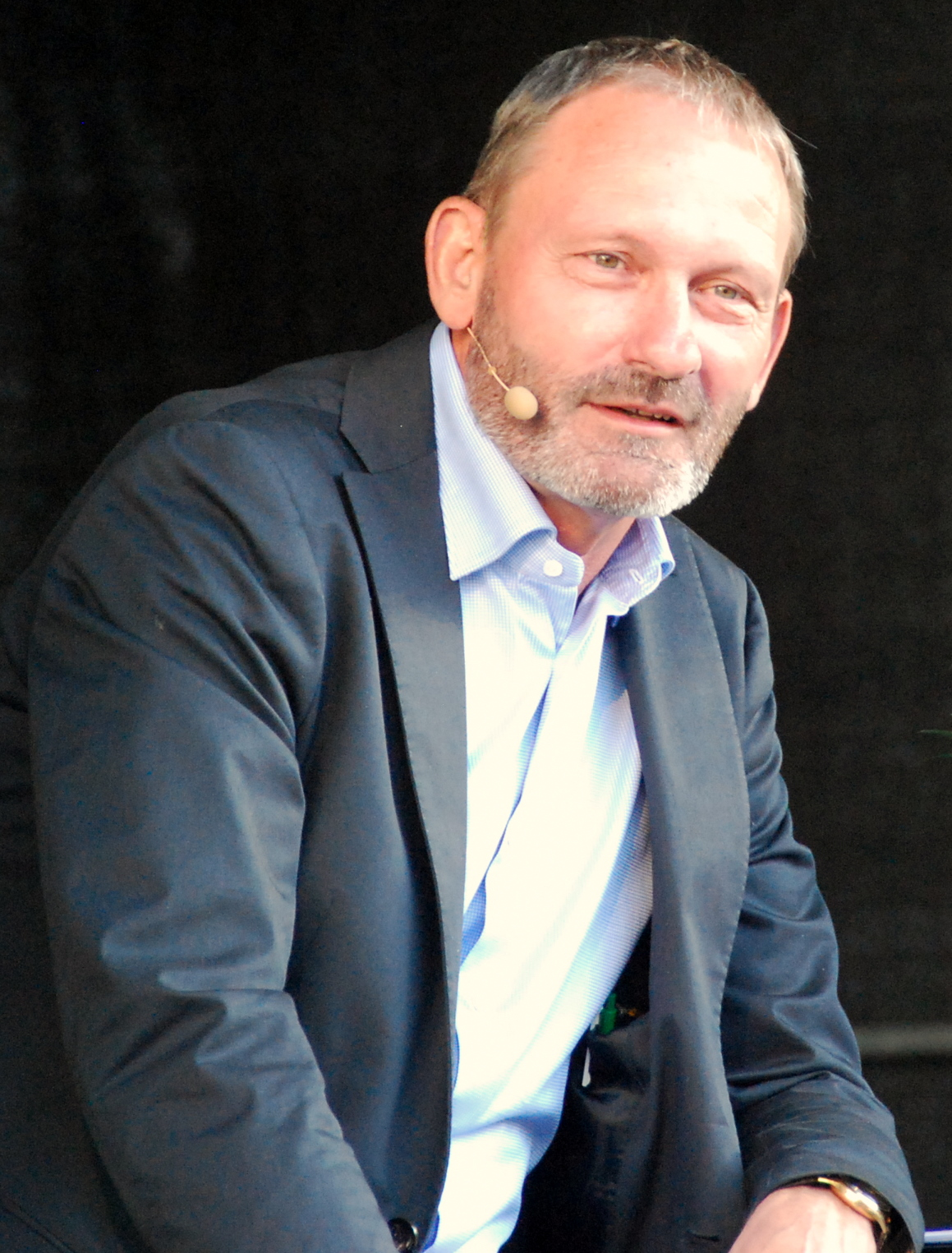
Preben Elkjær.

=== January–March ===
- 31 January – Henrik Dam Kristensen, politician
- 17 February – Lars Brygmann, actor
- 30 March – Stig L. Andersson, landscape architect

=== April–June ===
- 6 April – Jesper Bank, sailor
- 28 April – Tøger Seidenfaden, journalist, editor-in-chief of Politiken (died 2011)
- 9 May – Kristian Levring, film director
- 17 May – Peter Høeg, writer of fiction

=== July–September ===
- 11 September – Preben Elkjær, footballer

=== October–December ===
- 5 October – Jakob Nielsen, computer scientist
- 20 November
  - Torben Andersen, economist
  - John Eriksen, footballer (died 2002)
- 13 December – Lars Schwander, photographer, gallerist

== Deaths ==
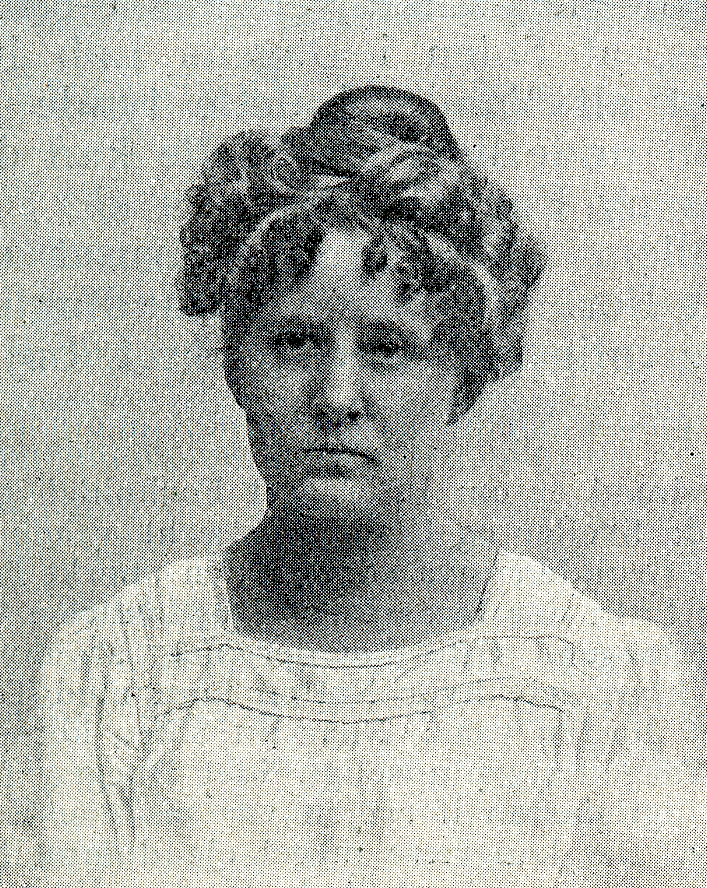
Thit Jensen.

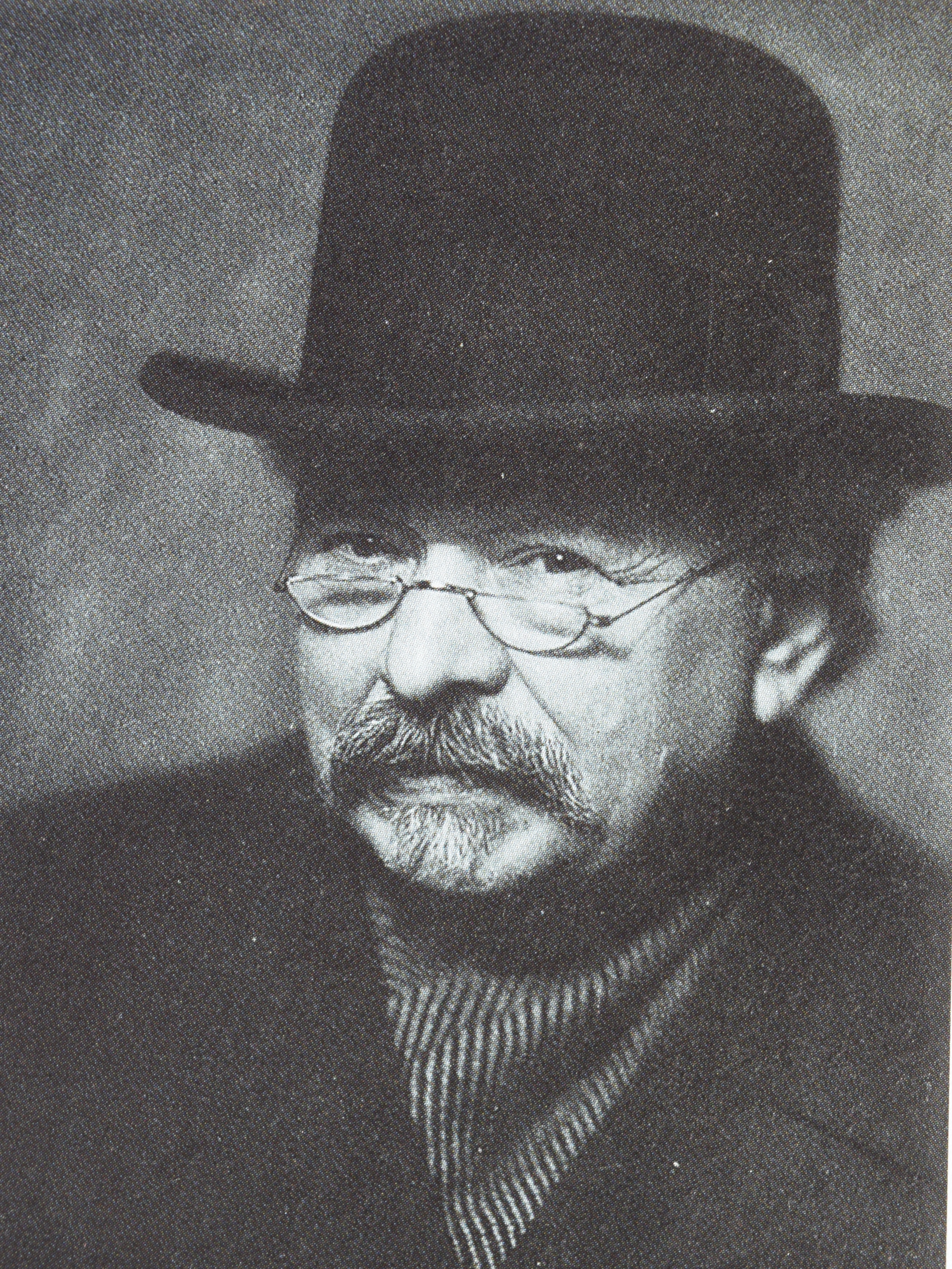
Aksel Jørgensen.

=== January–March ===
- 2 January – Søren Absalon Larsen, physicist active in the field of electroacoustics; the Larsen effect was named after him (born 1871)
- 6 January – Viggo Larsen, film actor, director and producer (born 1880)

=== April–June ===
- 14 April – Thorvald Madsen, physician and bacteriologist (born 1870)
- 18 April – Jens Laursøn Emborg, organist and composer (born 1876)
- 6 May – Ebbe Kornerup, writer and painter (born 1874)
- 9 May – Inger Margrethe Boberg, folklore researcher and writer (born 1900)
- 14 May – Thit Jensen, novelist and author of short stories, plays and society critical articles (born 1876)
- 21 May – Jens Søndergaard, painter (born 1895)
- 26 May – Peter Bang, engineer (born 1900)
- 9 June – Aksel Jørgensen, painter and wood engraver (born 1883)
- 17 June – Olaf Rude, painter (born 1886)

=== July–September ===
- 5 July – Magdalene Lauridsen, educator (born 1873)
- 28 August – Erik Tuxen, conductor, composer and arranger (born 1902)
- 2 September – Peter Freuchen, explorer, writer and traveller (born 1886)

=== Date unknown ===
- Axel Andersen Byrval, amateur football player and manager, national football team manager 1913–15 and 1917–18 (born 1875)

== See also ==
- 1957 in Danish television
