= Festival of British Popular Songs 1956 =

Date and venue
- Final: 22 October 1956
- Venue: King's Theatre, Hammersmith, London

Production
- Host broadcaster: BBC Television
- Executive producer: Francis Essex
- Presenters: Wilfrid Thomas

Participants
- Number of entries: 36

Vote
- Winning song: "Everybody Falls in Love With Someone" by Peter Hart and Norman Newell

The Festival of British Popular Songs 1956 was a song contest organised by BBC Television and the inaugural edition of the Festival of British Popular Songs, which became the United Kingdom's national selection process the following year for the 1957 Eurovision Song Contest. Held from May to October, the contest featured 36 songs performed twice through 6 heats. The contest was made to promote British music, as an answer to claims that the BBC favoured American music.

The eventual winner was "Everybody Falls in Love With Someone", written and composed by Peter Hart and Norman Newell. Though not recorded by any of its performers at the contest, the winning song went on to be recorded by Matt Monro and Dickie Henderson. The contest is notable for inspiring changes in the Eurovision Song Contest, most notably introducing a scoreboard to the voting sequence.

== The competition ==
=== Format ===
The competition consisted of six heats held every four weeks starting on 7 May 1956. Each heat had six songs competing and each song was performed twice by two different singers, one accompanied by an orchestra (directed by either Eric Robinson, Stanley Black, or George Melachrino), and one accompanied by a small band. The George Mitchell singers accompanied each show as backing vocalists. The best placing song in each heat, decided by jury panels situated in different cities across the United Kingdom, qualified to the final.

=== Competing entries ===
The BBC selected 36 entries from over 90 songs submitted by British music publishers. The songs were chosen by a committee chaired by Ronnie Waldman. Known song titles, associated performers, and songwriters are shown below:

Performer 1	Performer 2	Song	Songwriter(s)
		"A Field of Golden Corn"	Robert Farnon
		"Andalucia"	Ron Grainer
Lester Ferguson	Jean Campbell	"Cloudy Moon"	John Harris
		"England Is Made of Us"	John Watson
Johnny Brandon / Dennis Lotis	The Keynotes	"Everybody Falls in Love With Someone"	Peter Hart, Norman Newell
		"Everything She's Got Is Mine"	Harry Shaberman
Ronnie Carroll	Laurie Payne	"For You and Me"	David Lee & Clive Westlake
		"Just Another Day Gone By"	William Crompton & Morgan Jones
Shirley Abicair	Bill McGuffie	"Little Ship"	Irene Roper, Terry Roper
Pamela Charles		"Love Goes Dancing Through My Heart"	Harold Irving
Carole Carr	The Max Jaffa Quartet	"No Love Could Be"	Max Francis & Bill Craig
		"Pedlar of Dream"	Michael Pratt
		"The Waiter Was Yawning"	Sam Johnson
		"There'll Be Orange Blossom in Your Hair"	Norman Percival
		"This Love of Mine"	Tommy Sampson
Petula Clark	The Bill McGuffie Quartet	"Wibbly Wobbly Moon"	Vivian Ellis

Performers which are known to have participated but it is not known with what song are: Kenny Baker, Joan Bramhall, Tony Brent, Dora Bryan, Alma Cogan, The Coronets, Diana Decker, Doreen Duke, The Four Grads, Dennis Hale, John Hanson, Ronnie Hilton, Kathie Kay, The Kentones, Lee Lawrence, Benny Lee, Vanessa Lee, Janie Marden, Bill O'Connor, Alan Page, Anne Shelton, Bruce Trent.

=== Shows ===
==== Heat 1 ====
Heat 1 – 7 May 1956
Performer 1	Performer 2	Song	Place
Shirley Abicair	Bill McGuffie	"Little Ship"	1
Unknown	Unknown	"This Love of Mine"	2
Unknown	Unknown	"Everything She's Got Is Mine"	5
Unknown	Unknown	"Pedlar of Dream"	Unknown
Unknown	Unknown	Unknown	Unknown
Unknown	Unknown	Unknown	Unknown

The titles of the 3 other songs are unknown, other known performers are listed below:

- Kenny Baker
- Alma Cogan
- Diana Decker
- Dennis Hale
- Ronnie Hilton
- The Kentones
- Vanessa Lee
- Bruce Trent

Frankie Vaughan was supposed to compete in this heat but withdrew as he felt he could not do justice to the song he was asked to sing. The orchestra was directed by Eric Robinson, and The Bill McGuffie Quartet was the small band.

==== Heat 2 ====
Heat 2 – 4 June 1956
Performer 1	Performer 2	Song	Place
Ronnie Carroll	Laurie Payne	"For You and Me"	1
Pamela Charles	Unknown	"Love Goes Dancing Through My Heart"	Unknown
Unknown	Unknown	Unknown	Unknown
Unknown	Unknown	Unknown	Unknown
Unknown	Unknown	Unknown	Unknown
Unknown	Unknown	Unknown	Unknown

The titles of the other 4 songs are unknown, other known performers are listed below:

- Anne Shelton
- Dennis Lotis
- The Keynotes

The orchestra was directed by Stanley Black and the small band was organised by Semprini.

==== Heat 3 ====
Heat 3 – 2 July 1956
Performer 1	Performer 2	Song	Place
Carole Carr	The Max Jaffa Quartet	"No Love Could Be"	1
		"A Field of Golden Corn"	Unknown
Unknown	Unknown	Unknown	Unknown
Unknown	Unknown	Unknown	Unknown
Unknown	Unknown	Unknown	Unknown
Unknown	Unknown	Unknown	Unknown

The titles of the other 4 songs are unknown, other known performers are listed below:

- John Hanson
- Benny Lee
- Joan Bramhall
- The Coronets

The Orchestra was directed by George Melachrino and the small band was The Max Jaffa Quintet.

==== Heat 4 ====
Heat 4 – 30 July 1956
Draw	Performer 1	Performer 2	Song	Place	Points
1	Unknown	Unknown	"England Is Made of Us"	6	0
2	Unknown	Unknown	"The Waiter Was Yawning"	Unknown	Unknown
3	Johnny Brandon	The Keynotes	"Everybody Falls in Love With Someone"	1	Unknown
4	Unknown	Unknown	"There'll Be Orange Blossom in Your Hair"	Unknown	Unknown
5	Unknown	Unknown	"Just Another Day Gone By"	Unknown	Unknown
6	Unknown	Unknown	"Andalucia"	Unknown	Unknown

Other known performers are listed below:

- Dora Bryan
- Bill O'Connor
- Kathie Kay
- Doreen Duke
- Alan Page
- The Four Grads

The orchestra was directed by Eric Robinson and the small band was The Malcolm Lockyer Quartet.

==== Heat 5 ====
Heat 5 – 27 August 1956
Performer 1	Performer 2	Song	Place
Petula Clark	The Bill McGuffie Quartet	"Wibbly Wobbly Moon"	1
Unknown	Unknown	Unknown	Unknown
Unknown	Unknown	Unknown	Unknown
Unknown	Unknown	Unknown	Unknown
Unknown	Unknown	Unknown	Unknown
Unknown	Unknown	Unknown	Unknown

The titles of the other 5 songs are unknown, other known performers are listed below:

- Dennis Hale
- Janie Marden
- The Kentones

The Orchestra was directed by Stanley Black and the small band was The Bill McGuffie Quartet.

==== Heat 6 ====
Heat 6 – 24 September 1956
Performer 1	Performer 2	Song	Place
Lester Ferguson	Jean Campbell	"Cloudy Moon"	1
Unknown	Unknown	Unknown	Unknown
Unknown	Unknown	Unknown	Unknown
Unknown	Unknown	Unknown	Unknown
Unknown	Unknown	Unknown	Unknown
Unknown	Unknown	Unknown	Unknown

The titles of the other 5 songs are unknown, other known performers are listed below:

- Anne Shelton
- Lee Lawrence
- Tony Brent
- The Coronets

The orchestra was directed by George Melachrino and the small band was The Frank Weir Quartet.

==== Final ====
Final – 22 October 1956
Performer 1	Performer 2	Song	Place
Dennis Lotis	The Keynotes	"Everybody Falls in Love With Someone"	1
Shirley Abicair	Bill McGuffie	"Little Ship"	2
Ronnie Carroll	Laurie Payne	"For You And Me"	Unknown
Carole Carr	Max Jaffa	"No Love Could Be"	Unknown
Lester Ferguson	Jean Campbell	"Cloudy Moon"	Unknown
Petula Clark	The Bill McGuffie Quartet	"Wibbly Wobbly Moon"	Unknown

Johnny Brandon, who sang "Everybody Falls In Love With Someone" in heat 4, was replaced by Dennis Lotis in the final as he was in America during the time of the final.

Each song used the same orchestra conductor and small band as was used in its heat.

== Reception ==
The songs were seen by the public as of a low quality, with many people criticising the lack of originality and variation in the songs. However, the voting sections of the shows were often regarded as the most entertaining part of the show.
