= Sanremo Music Festival 1957 =

Italian song contest (7th edition)

Dates and venue
- Semi-final 1: 7 February 1957
- Semi-final 2: 8 February 1957
- Final: 9 February 1957
- Venue: Sanremo Casino; Sanremo, Italy

Production
- Broadcaster: Radiotelevisione italiana (RAI)
- Director: Lino Procacci
- Musical director: Cinico Angelini, Armando Trovajoli
- Artistic director: Giulio Razzi
- Presenters: Nunzio Filogamo, Marisa Allasio, Fiorella Mari, Nicoletta Orsomando

Vote
- Number of entries: 19
- Winner: "Corde della mia chitarra" Claudio Villa and Nunzio Gallo

The Sanremo Music Festival 1957 (Italian: Festival di Sanremo 1957), officially the 7th Italian Song Festival (VII Festival della Canzone Italiana di Sanremo), was the seventh annual Sanremo Music Festival, held at the Sanremo Casino in Sanremo between 7 and 10 February 1957. It was organised by Radiotelevisione italiana (RAI) in cooperation with the Sanremo Casino. The television production was directed by Lino Procacci. Giulio Razzi served as the artistic director. The shows were presented by Nunzio Filogamo, Marisa Allasio, Fiorella Mari, and Nicoletta Orsomando.

Every song was performed twice, with different singers or groups, and with most artists performing multiple songs. This edition included four nights, containing two semi-finals, a final and a competition of songs submitted by independent composers.

The winner of the festival was "Corde della mia chitarra", written by Mario Ruccione and Giuseppe Fiorelli, and performed by Claudio Villa and Nunzio Gallo; with "Usignolo", written by Carlo Concina, Luigi Luciano Martelli, and Gino Castellani, and performed by Claudio Villa and Giorgio Consolini, placing second; and "Scusami", written by Walter Malgoni, Anna Perrone, and Ornella Ferrari, and performed by Gino Latilla and Tonina Torrielli, placing third. In addition, "Ondamarina", written by Dario Bernazza and Luciano Lops, and performed by Claudio Villa and Giorgio Consolini, won the independent composers competition.

The winner, "Corde della mia chitarra", went on to represent Italy in the Eurovision Song Contest 1957, with Gallo chosen as the performer from its two interpreters.

== Competing entries ==
In a change from previous years, the selection of the entries for the Sanremo Music Festival was combined with the selection of 150 songs for RAI's radio programs of 1957.

Composers were required to have Italian citizenship. The lyrics were required to be in Italian or "in dialect". Submitted songs were not allowed to have been published or performed in public before the festival. Composers and music publishing firms could submit their songs until 15 October 1956. More than 4,000 songs were submitted, with more than 2,000 sent in from record companies. A commission of fifteen members first selected 150 songs, 124 of which had been submitted by record companies, 26 by independent composers.

From the first selection of 150 songs, a jury chose twenty songs among the submissions by music publishing firms and another ten songs among those submitted by independent composers. The jury consisted of Pietro Argento, Umberto Del Ciglio, E. A. Mario, Aldo Palazzeschi, Giulio Razzi, and Fulvio Palmieri, with Guglielmo Emanuel acting as jury president.

For the first time in the history of the Festival, two separate competitions were held: The twenty songs by music professionals and the ten songs by independent composers competed in two separate sections of the Sanremo Festival, with a winner chosen separately for each of the two categories.

Before the start of the festival, it was found out that the song "La cosa più bella" already had been commercially released in August 1956, which constituted a violation of the rules of the festival. Subsequently, the entry was disqualified without any replacement, which led to a final number of 19 competing entries in this category.

Disqualified

Entries presented by music publishing firms
Song	Composer	Lyricist	Publishing firm
"Ancora ci credo"	Francesco Campanozzi	Ettore Fecchi	Radiomelodie
"A poco a poco"	Carlo Innocenzi	Marcella Rivi	Nazionale
"Cancello tra le rose"	Marino De Paolis	Umberto Bertini	E.C.O.
"Casetta in Canadà"	Vittorio Mascheroni	Mario Panzeri	Mascheroni
"Corde della mia chitarra"	Mario Ruccione	Giuseppe Fiorelli	Suvini Zerboni
"Estasi"	Linda Lucci	Carlo Da Vinci	Ulpia
"Finalmente"	Giuseppe Bonavolontà	Marcella Rivi	De Santis
"Il pericolo numero uno"	Enzo Bonagura; Michele Cozzoli		Campi
"Intorno a te (è sempre primavera)"	Mario De Angelis		Nord Sud
~~"La cosa più bella"~~	~~Dino Olivieri~~	~~Pinchi~~	~~Continental~~
"Le trote blu"	Luigi Gelmini	Diego Calcagno	Souvenir
"Nel giardino del mio cuore"	Gorni Kramer	Gian Carlo Testoni	Kramer
"Non ti ricordi più"	Gino Poggiali	Carlo Da Vinci	R. Maurri
"Per una volta ancora"	Giovanni D'Anzi	Umberto Bertini	D'Anzi
"Raggio nella nebbia"	Francesco Pagano	Franco Salina	Radiomelodie
"Scusami"	Walter Malgoni; Anna Perrone	Ornella Ferrari	Italcarisch
"Un certo sorriso"	Mario Ruccione	Giuseppe Fiorelli	Canzoni Moderne
"Un filo di speranza"	Saverio Seracini	Gian Carlo Testoni	La Cicala
"Un sogno di cristallo"	Pino Calvi	Alberto Testa	Sonzogno
"Usignolo"	Carlo Concina	Luigi Luciano Martelli; Gino Castellani	Casiroli

Entries presented by independent composers
Song	Songwriter(s)
"Chiesetta solitaria"	Alfredo Bezzi; Corrado Pintaldi
"Era l'epoca del cuore"	Nello Segurini
"Il mio cielo"	Edoardo De Leitenburg; Luciano Beretta
"Il nostro sì"	Franco Lodigiani; Fernando C. Mainardi
"La cremagliera delle Dolomiti"	Giulio Perretta; Dino Fedri
"La più bella canzone del mondo"	Astro Mari; Gino Filippini
"Ondamarina" (Note: Also written as "Onda marina" in some sources)	Dario Bernazza; Luciano Lops
"Sono un sognatore"	Piero Umiliani; Gian Carlo Testoni
"Sorrisi e lacrime"	Raoul De Giusti; Franco Cassano
"Venezia mia"	Mario Peragallo

== Contest overview ==
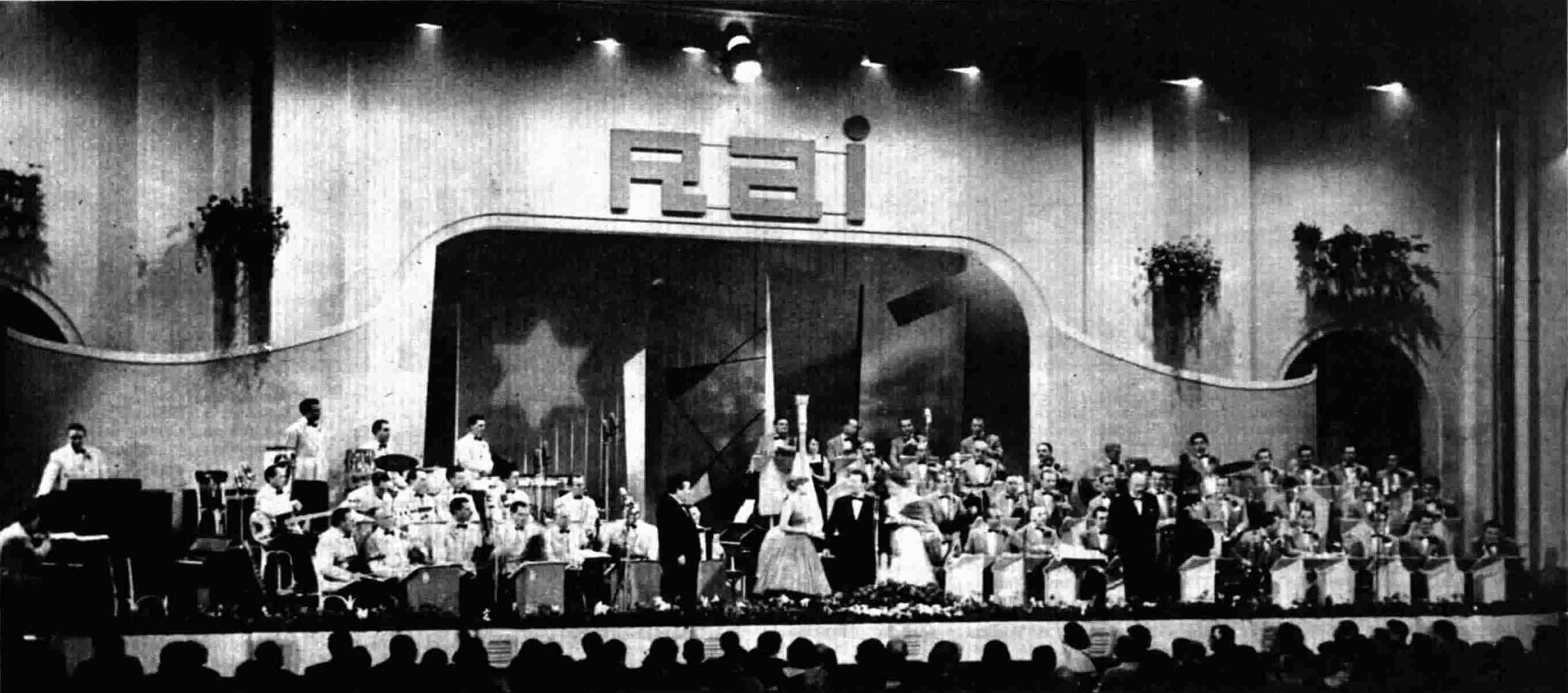
The stage with the hosts of the programme (centre), the Angelini orchestra (left) and the Trovajoli orchestra (right)

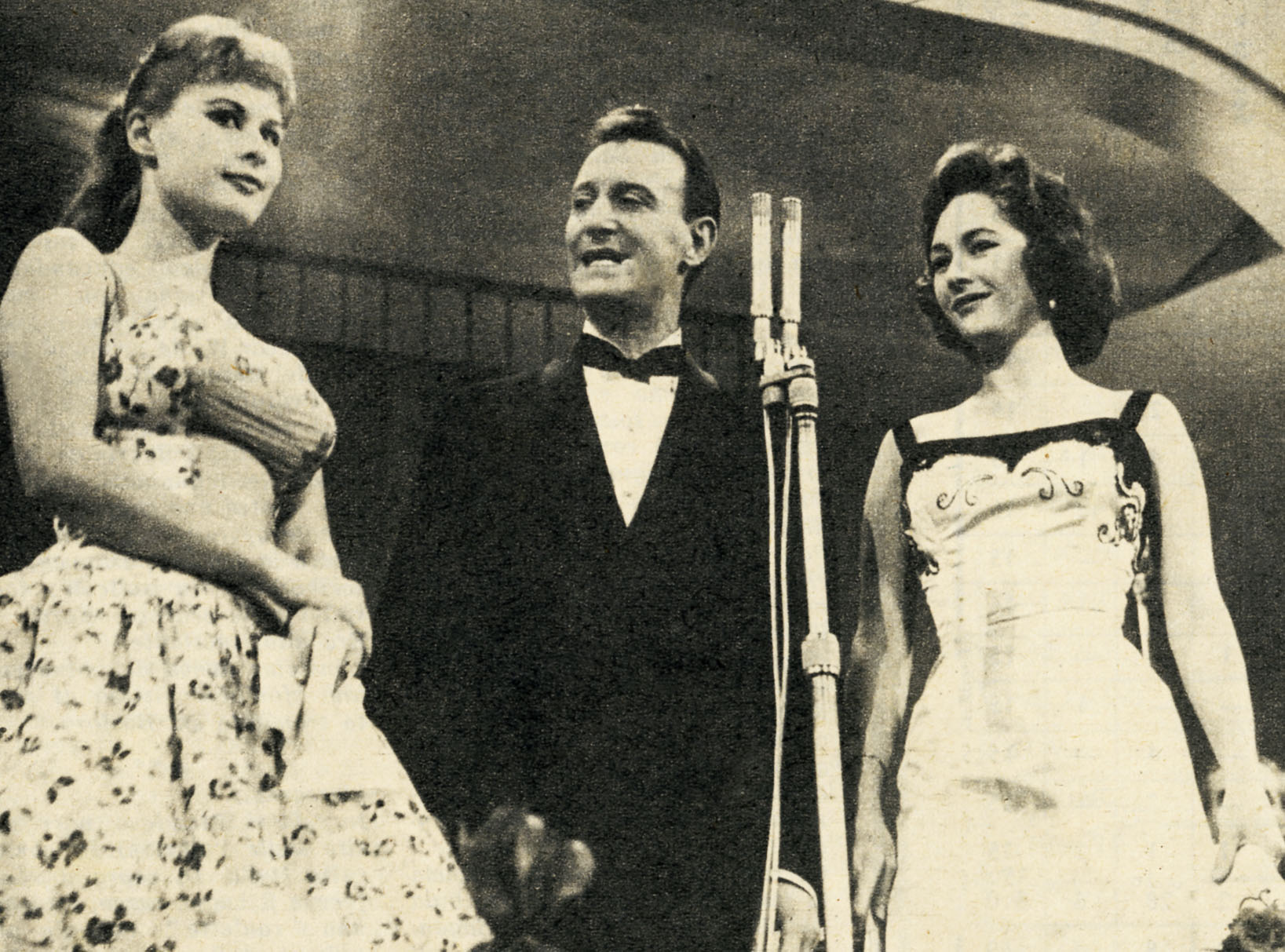
Marisa Allasio, Nunzio Filogamo and Fiorella Mari presenting the programme

The Sanremo Music Festival 1957 consisted of four shows, with the competition among the 19 songs submitted by music publishers taking place in two semi-finals on 7 and 8 February 1957, and a final held on 9 February 1957. The ten entries submitted by independent composers competed in their category on 10 February 1957.

Each of the four nights included overall twenty performances, ten songs with two performances for each, except for the second night which presented nine songs and overall eighteen performances. Five songs advanced from each semi-final to again compose ten songs for the third and final night.

The artists were accompanied by a 19-piece-orchestra under the musical direction of Cinico Angelini and by a jazz orchestra of 34 instruments under the direction of Armando Trovajoli. After all songs in each show had been performed, a recap of the competing entries was played on the piano by Alberto Semprini, accompanied by four guitars.

Fifteen juries, among them one jury composed of 70 spectators in Sanremo drawn by lot, and 14 juries sitting in RAI's regional headquarters, composed of 15 radio listeners each also chosen by lot, decided the winning songs by voting. In order to prevent biases, the members of all juries were replaced for each show. As to the Sanremo jury, only spectators who had bought their seat in the public ticket sale were eligible to be drawn. Tickets for the show were reportedly in high demand, costing up to 9,000–10,000 lire for the final.

=== Semi-final 1 ===
The first semi-final of the entries submitted by music publishers took place on 7 February 1957 at 22:00 CET (21:00 UTC). Ten songs competed, five of them were selected for the final. Contrary to initial plans and in what looked to be a spontaneous decision, the five songs chosen for the final were not performed again at the end of the night due to presumed low interest of spectators and radio listeners when the results were announced at 01:15 CET.

In the Sanremo jury, which consisted of 70 spectators drawn by lot, figured also singer Nilla Pizzi, a fact that drew public attention since she had not only won the Sanremo editions of 1951 and 1952 but had also held a press conference shortly before in order to protest against her not being chosen as a singer for this edition.

Qualifier

Semi-final 1 – 7 February 1957
R/O	Song	Artist 1 (Note: Accompanied by the orchestra under the direction of Cinico Angelini)	Artist 2 (Note: Accompanied by the orchestra under the direction of Armando Trovajoli)	Points	Place
1	"Finalmente"	Gino Baldi	Luciano Virgili	—N/a	
2	"Un certo sorriso"	Gianni Ravera	Natalino Otto	—N/a	
3	"Estasi"	Fiorella Bini	Flo Sandon's	—N/a	
4	"Il pericolo numero uno"	Claudio Villa and Gino Latilla	Natalino Otto	66	5
5	"Cancello tra le rose"	Claudio Villa	Giorgio Consolini	89	2
6	"Non ti ricordo più"	Gino Latilla	Nunzio Gallo	—N/a	
7	"Casetta in Canadà"	Carla Boni, Gino Latilla and Duo Fasano	Gloria Christian and Il Poker di Voci	78	3
8	"Scusami"	Gino Latilla	Tonina Torrielli	78	3
9	"Usignolo"	Claudio Villa	Giorgio Consolini	97	1
10	"Un sogno di cristallo"	Carla Boni	Jula De Palma	—N/a	

=== Semi-final 2 ===
The second semi-final of the entries submitted by music publishers took place on 8 February 1957 at 22:00 CET. Nine songs competed, five of them were selected for the final.

Semi-final 2 – 8 February 1957
R/O	Song	Artist 1 (Note: Accompanied by the orchestra under the direction of Armando Trovajoli)	Artist 2 (Note: Accompanied by the orchestra under the direction of Cinico Angelini)	Points	Place
1	"Intorno a te (è sempre primavera)"	Tonina Torrielli	Tina Allori	92	3
2	"Nel giardino del mio cuore"	Jula De Palma	Gino Baldi	—N/a	
3	"Le trote blu"	Gloria Christian, Natalino Otto and Il Poker di Voci	Carla Boni and Duo Fasano	36	5
4	"Raggio nella nebbia"	Jula De Palma and Il Poker di voci	Fiorella Bini and Duo Fasano	—N/a	
5	"Per una volta ancora"	Nunzio Gallo	Carla Boni	43	4
6	"Un filo di speranza"	Natalino Otto	Gino Latilla and Duo Fasano	93	2
7	"Ancora ci credo"	Flo Sandon's	Tina Allori	—N/a	
8	"A poco a poco"	Luciano Virgili	Gino Latilla	—N/a	
9	"Corde della mia chitarra"	Nunzio Gallo	Claudio Villa	161	1

=== Final ===
The final took place on 9 February 1957 at 22:00 CET.

The winner was "Corde della mia chitarra", written by Mario Ruccione and Giuseppe Fiorelli, and performed by Claudio Villa and Nunzio Gallo; with "Usignolo", written by Carlo Concina, Luigi Luciano Martelli, and Gino Castellani, and performed by Claudio Villa and Giorgio Consolini, placing second; and "Scusami", written by Walter Malgoni, Anna Perrone, and Ornella Ferrari, and performed by Gino Latilla and Tonina Torrielli, placing third. The top three songs were performed again at the end of the show.

Winner

Final – 9 February 1957
R/O	Song	Artist 1 (Note: Accompanied by the orchestra under the direction of Cinico Angelini)	Artist 2 (Note: Accompanied by the orchestra under the direction of Armando Trovajoli)	Points	Place
1	"Le trote blu"	Carla Boni and Duo Fasano	Gloria Christian, Natalino Otto and Il Poker di Voci	4	10
2	"Per una volta ancora"	Carla Boni	Nunzio Gallo	12	8
3	"Il pericolo numero uno"	Gino Latilla and Claudio Villa	Natalino Otto and Il Poker di Voci	24	6
4	"Scusami"	Gino Latilla	Tonina Torrielli	43	3
5	"Casetta in Canadà"	Carla Boni, Gino Latilla and Duo Fasano	Gloria Christian and Il Poker di Voci	32	4
6	"Cancello tra le rose"	Claudio Villa	Giorgio Consolini	30	5
7	"Intorno a te (è sempre primavera)"	Tina Allori	Tonina Torrielli	16	7
8	"Un filo di speranza"	Gino Latilla and Duo Fasano	Natalino Otto and Il Poker di Voci	7	9
9	"Usignolo"	Claudio Villa	Giorgio Consolini	48	2
10	"Corde della mia chitarra"	Claudio Villa	Nunzio Gallo	63	1

Detailed voting results of the final
	Total score	Palermo	Bari	Naples	Rome	Cagliari	Florence	Ancona	Trieste	Venice	Bolzano	Bologna	Milan	Turin	Genoa	Sanremo
"Le trote blu"	4							1				1		1	1	
"Per una volta ancora"	12	2	1					3		2						4
"Il pericolo numero uno"	24	3	2	1			1	1		4	5	1	2			4
"Scusami"	43	4	2	4	3	1	2	1	2	2			2	2	3	15
"Casetta in Canadà"	32		3		3	1		1	3		2	1		2	1	15
"Cancello tra le rose"	30	3	3	2		3	3	1	1	2		4	3	1	3	1
"Intorno a te (è sempre primavera)"	16	1			2	4		1			1	3				4
"Un filo di speranza"	7				2				1				1		1	2
"Usignolo"	48		3	5	3	2	5	2	6	3	3	1		5		10
"Corde della mia chitarra"	63	2	1	3	2	4	4	4	2	2	4	4	7	4	6	14

=== Independent composers competition ===
As the fourth and final night of the festival, the competition between entries submitted by independent composers (Concorso liberi autori) took place on 10 February 1957 at 22:00 CET.

The winner was "Ondamarina", written by Dario Bernazza and Luciano Lops, and performed by Claudio Villa and Giorgio Consolini.

Independent composers competition – 10 February 1957
R/O	Song	Artist 1 (Note: Accompanied by the orchestra under the direction of Cinico Angelini)	Artist 2 (Note: Accompanied by the orchestra under the direction of Armando Trovajoli)	Points	Place
1	"Chiesetta solitaria"	Claudio Villa	Giorgio Consolini	24	4
2	"La cremagliera delle Dolomiti"	Duo Fasano	Gloria Christian and Il Poker di Voci	16	5
3	"Era l'epoca del Cuore"	Tina Allori	Flo Sandon's	13	6
4	"Sono un sognatore"	Gino Latilla	Natalino Otto	6	10
5	"Venezia mia"	Gianni Ravera and Duo Fasano	Luciano Virgili and Il Poker di Voci	66	2
6	"Il nostro sì"	Gino Baldi	Tonina Torrielli	13	6
7	"Ondamarina"	Claudio Villa	Giorgio Consolini	80	1
8	"Sorrisi e lacrime"	Fiorella Bini	Jula De Palma	13	6
9	"La più bella canzone del mondo"	Gino Latilla	Nunzio Gallo	36	3
10	"Il mio cielo"	Carla Boni	Luciano Virgili	12	9

Detailed voting results of the independent composers competition
	Total score	Ancona	Bari	Bologna	Bolzano	Cagliari	Florence	Genoa	Milan	Naples	Palermo	Rome	Turin	Trieste	Venice	Sanremo
"Chiesetta solitaria"	24	1	2			3	1	3		5	3	1	1	3	1	
"La cremagliera delle Dolimiti"	16		1	1	1		1	1	1					1	1	8
"Era l'epoca del cuore"	13	1				1	1		1	1	1					7
"Sono un sognatore"	6	1					1				1	1		1		1
"Venezia mia"	66	2	1	2	3	6	5	2	5	4	4	3	6	4	5	14
"Il nostro sì"	13			1	1			2	1				2	1	1	4
"Ondamarina"	80	8	7	9	9	3	1	3	4	3	5	9	2	2	4	11
"Sorrisi e lacrime"	13								1		1				1	10
"La più bella canzone del mondo"	36	2	4	1	1	2	4	2	2	2			4	3	1	8
"Il mio cielo"	12			1			1	2				1			1	6

This seventh edition of the Sanremo Music Festival was seen as a particular success for singer Claudio Villa who had sung the first- and second-placed entries of the final as well as the song which won the independent composers competition.

== Broadcasts ==
=== Local broadcast ===
All shows were broadcast on Italian Television and Secondo Programma, beginning at 22:00 CET. In the semi-finals, Italian television finished its broadcasts after the first part of each show, whereas on the radio a second part aired after midnight where the five songs chosen for the final were announced and planned to be performed again.

=== International broadcasts ===
The final of 9 February 1957 was also broadcast via the Eurovision network in other countries. Known details on the broadcasts of the final in each country, including the specific broadcasting stations are shown in the tables below.

International broadcasters of the Sanremo Music Festival 1957 Final – 9 February 1957
Country	Broadcaster	Channel(s)	Commentator(s)	Ref(s)
Austria	ORF	Österreichisches Fernsehen		
Belgium	NIR	NIR		
Denmark	Statsradiofonien	Statsradiofonien TV	Mogens Kjelstrup	
France	RTF	RTF	Jean Landier	
Germany	ARD	Deutsches Fernsehen	Elena Gerhardt	
Luxembourg	CLT	Télé-Luxembourg		
Monaco	Télé Monte-Carlo			
Monaco	Radio Monte Carlo			
Netherlands	NTS	NTS	Maurits de Wilde	
Sweden	SR	Sveriges TV		
Switzerland	SRG SSR	SRG	Lilian Gerhart	
Switzerland	SRG SSR	TSR	Jean Landier	

The independent composers competition on 10 February was also broadcast on Radio Monte Carlo.

Broadcaster RAI estimated that in Italy seven million viewers and listeners followed the contest.

== Eurovision Song Contest ==
At the Eurovision Song Contest 1957, which was held on 3 March 1957 in Frankfurt, Italy was represented by the song "Corde della mia chitarra", which had won the final in the category of entries submitted by music publishers. At the Eurovision Song Contest, it was sung by Nunzio Gallo. Gallo was accompanied on stage by the guitar player Piero Gosio. Armando Trovajoli conducted the orchestra for the Italian entry. The performance of the song drew attention due to its extensive length of more than five minutes. With a duration of about 5:09 minutes, it is the longest entry in the contest's history. From 1958 on, the maximum duration of each Eurovision entry was strictly limited to three and a half minutes.

Eurovision Song Contest 1957 was broadcast in Italy on Italian Television with commentary by Adriana Alberti, as well as on Secondo Programma.

=== Voting ===
Each participating broadcaster assembled a ten-member jury panel. Every jury member could give one vote to his or her favourite song. Out of ten songs from ten competing countries at the Eurovision Song Contest, the Italian song achieved sixth place, receiving points from five out of the nine other countries.

Votes awarded to Italy
Score	Country
2 votes	Netherlands; United Kingdom
1 vote	Belgium; Denmark; Luxembourg

Votes awarded by Italy
Score	Country
4 votes	Luxembourg
3 votes	Denmark
1 vote	Germany; Netherlands; Switzerland
