= Germany in the Eurovision Song Contest 1957 =

- Eurovision Song Contest 1957
- Participating broadcaster: ARD (Note: Arbeitsgemeinschaft der öffentlich-rechtlichen Rundfunkanstalten der Bundesrepublik Deutschland) – Hessischer Rundfunk (HR)
- Country: Germany
- Selection process: National final
- Selection date: 17 February 1957

Competing entry
- Song: "Telefon, Telefon"
- Artist: Margot Hielscher
- Songwriters: Friedrich Meyer; Ralph Maria Siegel

Placement
- Final result: 4th, 8 votes

Participation chronology

Germany was represented at the Eurovision Song Contest 1957 with the song "Telefon, Telefon", composed by Friedrich Meyer, with lyrics by Ralph Maria Siegel, and performed by Margot Hielscher. The German participating broadcaster on behalf of ARD, Hessischer Rundfunk (HR), selected its entry through a national final. In addition, HR was also the host broadcaster and staged the event at the Großer Sendesaal des hessischen Rundfunks in Frankfurt.

== Before Eurovision ==
=== Zwei auf einem Pferd ===
Hessischer Rundfunk (HR) on behalf of ARD, organised and produced the German national final as part of the show Zwei auf einem Pferd. Zwei auf einem Pferd was a regular game show starting in autumn 1956. The selection of the German entry took place at the Großer Sendesaal des Hessischen Rundfunks in Frankfurt – the same venue as for the Eurovision Song Contest 1957 – on 17 February 1957 at 20:15 CET (19:15 UTC). The final was broadcast on ARD's Deutsches Fernsehen, and abroad on Österreichisches Fernsehen and Dutch television. It was hosted by Hans-Joachim Kulenkampff and directed by Ekkehard Böhmer. Hans-Otto Grünefeldt oversaw the production of the show.

Four songs competed in the national final. HR had asked four composers to write entries for the selection. The artists were accompanied by the Tanzorchester des Hessischen Rundfunks under the musical direction of Willy Berking. A jury consisting of the eight directors of entertainment programs of the West-German broadcasters (Note: WDR, NDR, Radio Bremen, SWF, SDR, BR, RIAS, and HR) decided the winner. They gave their votes via telephone and the results were shown on a scoreboard. Each juror distributed ten votes among his favourite songs. "Telefon, Telefon", composed by Friedrich Meyer, and with lyrics by Ralph Maria Siegel, won the national final with a large margin and was selected as the German entry.

National final – 17 February 1957
R/O	Artist	Song	Composer	Lyricist	Votes	Place
1	Renée Franke	"Ich brauche Dein Herz"	Lotar Olias	Peter Moesser	18	2
2	Illo Schieder	"Was machen die Mädchen in Rio?"	Willy Mattes	Fini Busch	9	4
3	Paul Kuhn	"Das Klavier über mir"	Karl Götz	Walter Brandin	17	3
4	Margot Hielscher	"Telefon, Telefon"	Friedrich Meyer	Ralph Maria Siegel	36	1

== At Eurovision ==
HR hosted the Eurovision Song Contest 1957 in Frankfurt, when there was still no format in place for the previous year's winning broadcaster to host the following year, and following Switzerland hosting and winning in 1956. "Telefon, Telefon" was conducted by Willy Berking. Hielscher performed seventh, following the Netherlands and preceding France. The song received eight votes, placing fourth in a field of ten.

In order to overcome language barriers, the lyrics include some greetings and simple words in other European languages. The song's lyrics gave rise to what is generally considered the first performance with a prop in the contest history, with Hielscher in fact picking up a real telephone receiver during her performance.

Eurovision Song Contest 1957 was broadcast on ARD's Deutsches Fernsehen and on HR's radio station Zweites Programm. Excerpts from the show were also broadcast on UKW West (WDR) on 29 April 1957 at 21:15 CET.

=== Voting ===
Each participating broadcaster assembled a ten-member jury panel. Every jury member could give one vote to his or her favourite song.

Votes awarded to Germany
Score	Country
6 votes	France
1 vote	Belgium; Italy

Votes awarded by Germany
Score	Country
6 votes	France
2 votes	Belgium
1 vote	Netherlands; Switzerland
