= Netherlands in the Eurovision Song Contest 1957 =

- Eurovision Song Contest 1957
- Participating broadcaster: Nederlandse Televisie Stichting (NTS)
- Country: Netherlands
- Selection process: Het Eurovisie Song Festival – Nationale finale
- Selection date: 3 February 1957

Competing entry
- Song: "Net als toen"
- Artist: Corry Brokken
- Songwriters: Guus Jansen; Willy van Hemert

Placement
- Final result: 1st, 31 votes

Participation chronology

The Netherlands was represented at the Eurovision Song Contest 1957 with the song "Net als toen", composed by Guus Jansen, with lyrics by Willy van Hemert, and performed by Corry Brokken. The Dutch participating broadcaster, Nederlandse Televisie Stichting (NTS), selected its entry through a national final. Brokken had been one of the two representatives of the Netherlands in 1956. "Net als toen" would go on to win the Eurovision Song Contest.

== Before Eurovision ==
Like the previous year, Nederlandse Televisie Stichting (NTS) held a national final titled Het Eurovisie Song Festival – Nationale finale with eight songs competing. Initial plans foresaw ten competing entries: In late 1956, NTS asked five composers to submit songs for its national final: Jelle de Vries, Pi Scheffer, Melle Weersma, Johnny Steggerda, and Jaap Streefkerk. In addition, the Dutch songwriters association Vereniging van woord- en toondichters der lichte muziek (WTL) held an open selection among its members to submit another five entries. A total of 140 songs were submitted to WTL. NTS rejected most of the five songs selected by WTL so WTL chose to withdraw its participation altogether. Therefore NTS decided to turn to composers Guus Jansen and Jan Mol and asked them to write additional entries.

=== Het Eurovisie Song Festival – Nationale finale ===
NTS held the national final at the AVRO Studios in Hilversum on 3 February 1957 at 21:45 CET (20:45 UTC), with a duration of 45 minutes. It was broadcast live on television by NTS, with a deferred broadcast at 23:15 CET on radio Hilversum 2 by KRO. The final was produced by Piet te Nuyl Jr. and directed by Ben Steggerda. It was hosted by Karin Kraaykamp. The entries were sung by Corry Brokken, Hea Sury (Note: Also written as Heja Sury in some sources), John de Mol, and Marcel Thielemans. The artists were accompanied by the Metropole Orkest under the musical direction of Dolf van der Linden. The winner was chosen by postcard voting. Viewers had until 10 February 1957 to send in their postcards, giving one vote for a particular song per postcard.

A total of 17,433 postcards were received. The winning song was announced by Piet te Nuyl Jr. on 16 February 1957 during AVRO's Weekendshow on NTS. The winner was the song "Net als toen" written by Guus Jansen (music) and Willy van Hemert (lyrics), and sung by Corry Brokken.

Corry Brokken, who had been one of the two representatives of the Netherlands in 1956, was the clear winner of the national final, as her entries finished first and second.

National final – 3 February 1957
R/O	Artist	Song	Composer	Lyricist	Votes	Place
1	Marcel Thielemans	"Ik weet nog goed"	Pi Scheffer	Alexander Pola	965	4
2	Hea Sury	"De bromtol"	Melle Weersma	Willy van Hemert	532	7
3	John de Mol	"Havanna is zo ver"	Jan Mol	Jan Mol	814	6
4	Corry Brokken	"De messenwerper" (Note: Also written as "De messentrekker" in some sources)	Pi Scheffer	Alexander Pola	4,692	2
5	Corry Brokken	"Net als toen"	Guus Jansen	Willy van Hemert	6,927	1
6	Marcel Thielemans	"Simpe sampe sompe"	Johnny Steggerda	Johnny Steggerda	2,544	3
7	Hea Sury	"Een liedje van niets"	Jelle de Vries	Jelle de Vries	140	8
8	John de Mol	"Hiep, hiep, hiep hoera"	Jan Mol	Jan Mol	819	5

== At Eurovision ==
At the Eurovision Song Contest in Frankfurt, the Dutch entry was performed sixth on the night following Austria and preceding Germany. Corry Brokken was backed by violinist Sem Nijveen, who had a solo part in the arrangement by Bert Paige. The Dutch conductor at the contest was Dolf van der Linden. The Netherlands won the Eurovision Song Contest, having been in the lead from the first vote. At the close of voting, the Dutch entry had received 31 votes. It also received at least one vote from every other country. For Corry Brokken, the victory was the start of an international career.

Eurovision Song Contest 1957 was broadcast on Dutch television by NTS with commentary by Piet te Nuyl Jr.

=== Voting ===
Each participating broadcaster assembled a ten-member jury panel. Every jury member could give one vote to his or her favourite song. The Dutch jury was composed of viewers who had participated in the national final postcard voting and given their vote to the winning song. The jury members were five women (G.M. van Tienhoven, A. Kop, M. Tuynstra, D. Schuyers, E. Dam) and five men (Th. de Leede, Mr Hovens, F. Dickman, J. van Onnen, H. Hettinga). Siebe van der Zee acted as jury president and spokesperson.

Votes awarded to the Netherlands
Votes	Country
7 votes	Switzerland
6 votes	Austria
5 votes	Belgium
4 votes	France
3 votes	Denmark; Luxembourg
1 vote	Germany; Italy; United Kingdom

Votes awarded by the Netherlands
Votes	Country
5 votes	Denmark
2 votes	Italy
1 vote	Austria; France; United Kingdom
