= Danièle Dupré =

French singer

Danièle Dupré (French pronunciation: [danjɛl dypʁe]; 16 November 1938 - 24 November 2013) was a French singer from the 1950s. She was most notable for representing Luxembourg in the Eurovision Song Contest 1957 with her song Amours mortes (tant de peine) – Faded Love (So Much Pain) – where she finished in a tie for fourth.

Her recordings include several EPs for Polydor.

She died on the 24th of November 2013 at the age of 75.
