= Francis Bay =

Belgian composer

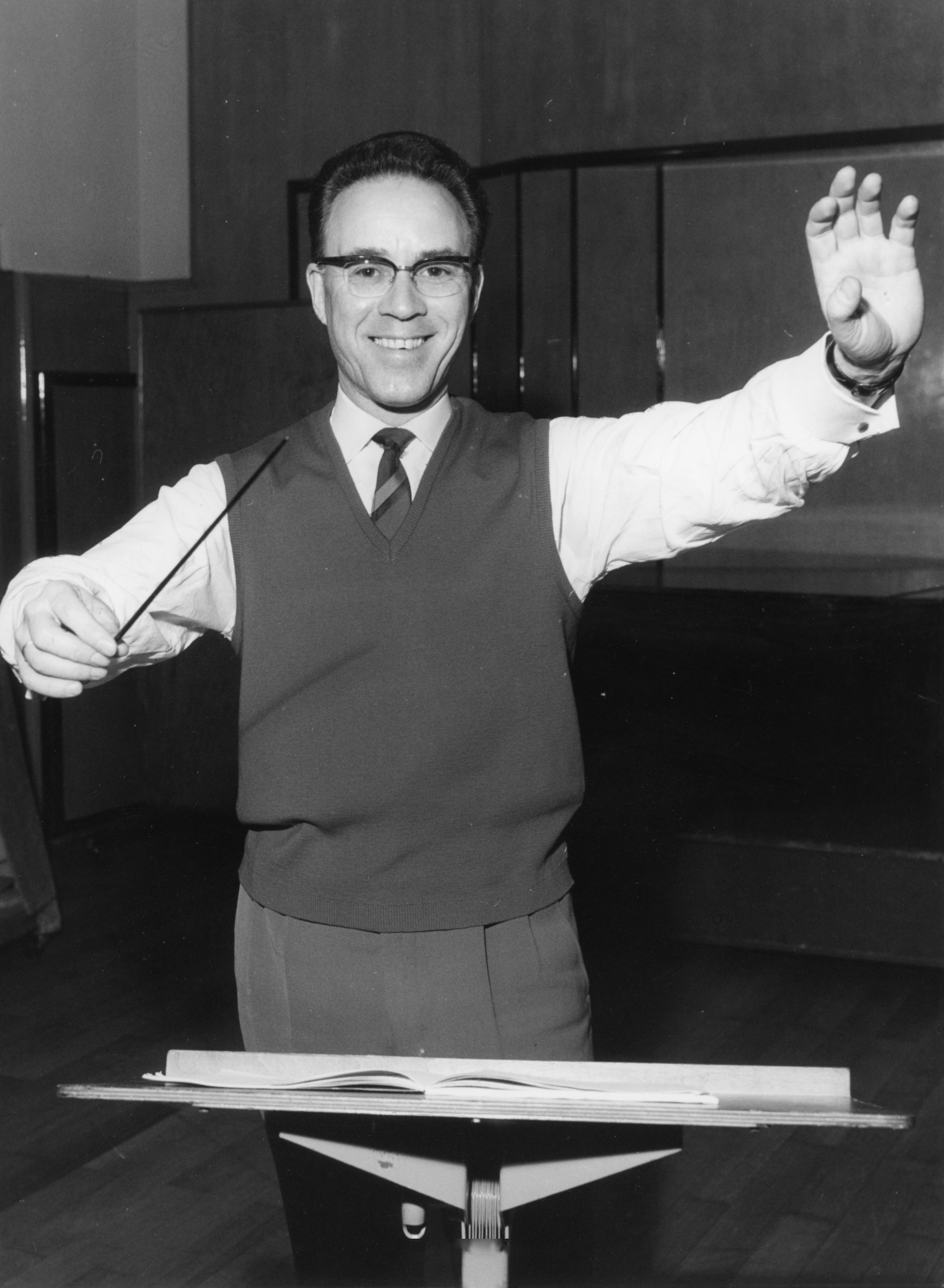
Francis Bay

Francis Bay (27 December 1914 – 24 April 2005) was a Belgian conductor. Born as Frans Bayezt, he conducted many Belgian entries in the Eurovision Song Contest and had his own Big band orchestra titled "Francis Bay and His Big Band.
