= Jack Kluger =

Belgian jazz bandleader

Jacob "Jack" Kluger (January 23, 1912, Antwerp - May 26, 1963, Brussels) was a Belgian jazz bandleader. In the early 1930s he led a group called the Collegians, and also worked with Maurice Pinto later in the decade. He then put together his own ensemble made principally of musicians from his previous two bands, which toured throughout Europe immediately before World War II; Johnny Claes was one of his sidemen. Between 1939 and 1941 his band made several recordings which The New Grove called "some of the finest to have been made by Belgian jazz musicians." Following the war he was employed at the International Music Company as a producer, studio arranger, promoter, and publisher.
