= Gustav Winckler =

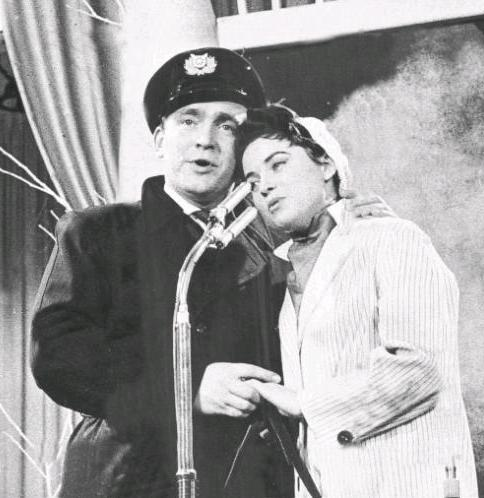
- Gustav Winckler & Birthe Wilke

Background information
- Birth name: Gustav Frands Wilzeck Winckler
- Also known as: Sam Payne, Gunnar Winckler
- Born: 13 October 1925 Copenhagen, Denmark
- Died: 20 January 1979 (aged 53) Viborg, Denmark
- Years active: 1950s – 1970s
- Website: gustavwinckler.com

Gustav Frands Wilzeck Winckler (13 October 1925 – 20 January 1979) was a popular Danish singer, composer and music publisher. He grew up in the Nørrebro district of Copenhagen and started his career as a decorator.

In 1948 as a young man he won a talent competition at National Scala Theatre in Copenhagen, as well as many others in Copenhagen. He was often compared to Bing Crosby.

He finally broke through in 1950 with engagements, regular appearances on Danmarks Radio and his first professional recording. Through the 1950s he recorded and toured in Denmark, Germany (under the name Gunnar Winkler) and England (under the name Sam Payne).

In 1957 after qualifying in the Dansk Melodi Grand Prix to represent Denmark at the Eurovision Song Contest, he participated in Eurovision Song Contest 1957, where he sang "Skibet skal sejle i nat" ("The ship is leaving tonight") with Birthe Wilke. They ranked number 3, and stunned television audiences with a 11-second-long kiss at the end of their performance.

He participated in the Danish Melodi Grand Prix twice afterwards, in 1964 with "Ugler i mosen" and then in 1966 with "Salami".

He died in a car crash in 1979.

His brother Jørgen Winckler also recorded songs in the 1950s and early 1960s.

Preceded by none	Denmark in the Eurovision Song Contest; 1957 (with Birthe Wilke)	Succeeded by Raquel Rastenni with Jeg rev et blad ud af min dagbog
