= Guy Lafarge =

French musician and composer

- Born: 5 May 1904; Périgueux, France
- Died: 17 December 1990 (aged 86); Paris, France
- Occupation: Composer

Guy Lafarge (5 May 1904 in Périgueux – 17 December 1990 in Paris) was a French composer of operettas and popular songs.

== Selected compositions ==
=== Operettas ===
- Niquette (1930)
- Carabas et Cie (1932)
- Monsieur Papillon (1934)
- La Course à l'amour (1941)
- Il faut marier maman (1950)
- La Leçon d'amour dans un parc (1951)
- Un chapeau de paille d'Italie (Strasbourg, 1966)
- L'Œuf à voiles (Nantes, 1977)
- Le Petit Café (Mulhouse, 1980) and La Cagnotte (Lille) with Jack Ledru

=== Chansons ===
- "La Seine", with lyrics by Flavien Monod (paroles) was first sung by Renée Lamy Pathé 78 and won the Prix de Deauville in 1948. The song was also covered by Lina Margy, Jacqueline François, Maurice Chevalier and Colette Renard, as well as by Bing Crosby on the 1953 album Le Bing: Song Hits of Paris.
- "La Belle amour", lyrics by Francis Carco, entry of France in the Eurovision Song Contest 1957

=== Film music ===
- Music for the 1953 film La môme vert-de-gris.
