= Flemming Weis =

Danish composer

(Carl) Flemming Weis (15 April 1898 – 30 September 1981) was a Danish composer. He was born in 1898 in Copenhagen, Denmark and died in Hellerup, Denmark in 1981. When studying, he specialized in the organ.

== Music ==
Weis was heavily influenced by teacher Carl Nielsen. Starting in 1926 he was a board member of the Danish branch of the International Society for Contemporary Music. He also joined the board of the Danish Composers' Society in 1956 and became its chairman in 1967. Weis was also Chairman of the board for the Society for the Publication of Danish Music.

List of Compositions (not in chronological order)
Date	Duration	Work
1938	10:00	Serenade for Wind Quintet, Without Serious Intentions [Uden reelle hensigter]
1923		String Quartet
1925		String Quartet
1927		Musik (for flute, clarinet and bassoon)
1938		String Quartet
1939		Sonatine (for flute, violin and cello)
1942		Diverterende musik (for flute, violin, viola and cello)
1945		Tema con variazioni for Wind Quintet
1956		Fantasia seria for String Quartet
1960		5 Epigrammer for String Quartet
1961		Serenade (for flute, violin, viola and cello)
1962		Femdelt Form II for Piano Quintet
1970		Statiske situationer for String Quartet
1974		3 Mobiler (for flute, violin, viola and cello)
1977		3 Studier (for oboe, clarinet, tenor sax and bassoon)
1977		String Quartet
1981		String Trio
1981		Tre for to (for flute, piano and percussion)
1928		Clarinet Sonata
1935		Pastorale og arabeske (for flute and piano)
1941		Violin Sonata
1945		Oboe Sonata
1953		Flute Sonata
1957		3 Arabesker (for flute and viola)
1976		4 Dialoger (for flute and guitar)
1980		Duo (for recorder and guitar)

== See also ==
- List of Danish composers
