= Lucien Lupi =

French opera singer

Lucien Lupi (14 July 1926 in Grasse – 30 May 2005 in Paris) was a French lyrical barytone and middle of the road singer.

Lucien Lupi was the husband of Dany Lauri, also a lyrical artist, and the father of singer Lauri Lupi.

== Bibliography ==
- Dany Lupi, Lucien Lupi, mon mari, le baryton à la voix d'or, Éditions Glyphe, Paris, ISBN 978-2358150880
