= Carl de Groof =

Austrian composer (1923–2007)

- Born: Karl Krof; 3 December 1923; Vienna, Austria
- Died: 18 January 2007 (aged 83); Javea, Spain
- Occupations: composer, film composer, orchestra conductor

Carl de Groof (born Karl Krof; 3 December 1923, in Vienna, Austria – 18 January 2007, in Javea, Spain) was an Austrian composer, film composer and orchestra conductor.

De Groof began his career shortly after the end of the Second World War. He worked as an orchestral musician and a writer for composers like Hans Lang. He also became a conductor, most notably for the Hofburg Palace in 1946 and for the Vienna Boys' Choir. In 1953 he founded the Symphonic Jazz Orchestra RAVAG, later dance orchestra of the Österreichischer Rundfunk (Austrian Broadcasting Corporation). In the same year he graduated with his own orchestra and also made an appearance in Anna Louise and Anton.

De Groof was then selected to write the background music and arrangement by Helmut Käutner for his legendary guerrilla and anti-war film Die letzte Brücke (The Last Bridge). He also conducted the Austrian song in the 1957 Eurovision Song Contest.

De Groof carried on in media and television work until the late 1960s and became known to many directors including Georg Tressler, Rolf Thiele and Rudolf Jugert. His career ended in 1969 with the theme tune to the programme Der alte Richter starring Paul Hörbiger. De Groof has a very wide fan base and he was a long-time musical companion of Heinz Conrads. In the Sunday morning programme "Was gibt es Neues?" (What is the News?), De Groof played piano. With his own orchestra, Carl de Groof also recorded a number of records with Wiener Liedern und Heurigenmusik as well as the very popular Egyptian singer Samira Soliman.

Carl de Groof found that he had multiple sclerosis at the beginning of the 1970s, which forced him to stop composing. Later in the same decade, he retired to Spain, where he spent his remaining years in the hope that the sunny climate would slow the progression of his condition.
