= National Institute of Radio Broadcasting =

Belgian public service broadcaster, 1930–1960

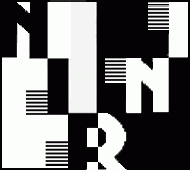
- Type: Broadcast radio and television
- Country: Belgium
- Availability: National
- Headquarters: Brussels, Belgium
- Owner: Government of Belgium
- Launch date: 18 June 1930; 96 years ago
- Dissolved: 18 May 1960; 66 years ago
- Replaced by: Belgisch Radio en Televisie, Nederlandse Uitzendingen (BRT) and Radiodiffusion-Télévision Belge, Emissions françaises (RTB)

The National Institute of Radio Broadcasting (French: Institut national de radiodiffusion, INR; Dutch: Nationaal Instituut voor de Radio-Omroep, NIR) was the national public service broadcasting company in Belgium between 1930 and 1960.

== History ==
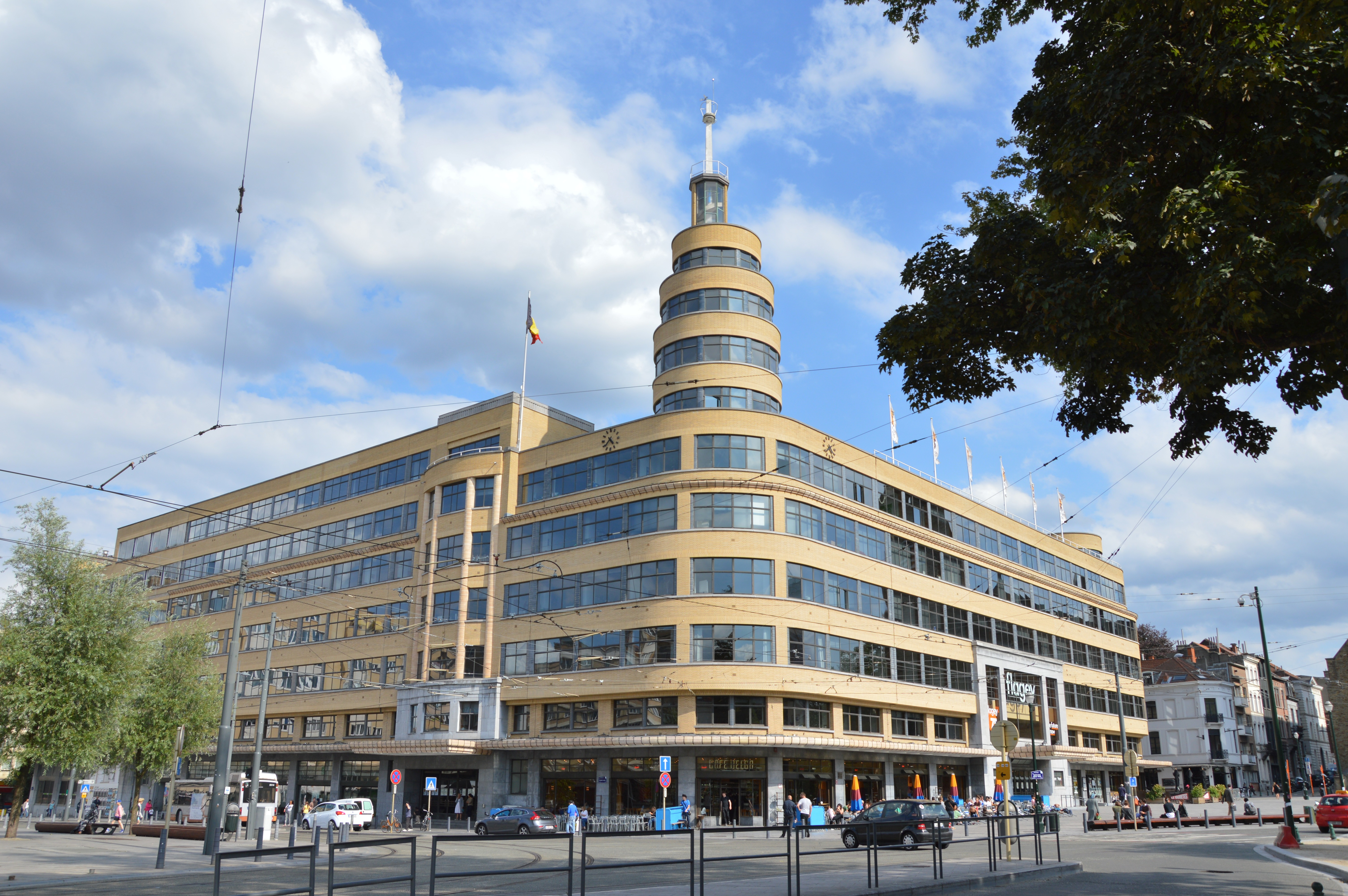
The Flagey Building, also known as Radio House (Maison de Radio), which housed the INR-NIR from 1938

Inspired by the precedent of the British Broadcasting Corporation, the INR-NIR provided radio broadcasting in French and Dutch and was intended to respond to the rise of private radio broadcasters over the previous decade. Although funded almost exclusively with government funds from radio licenses, the organisation did not have a broadcasting monopoly in Belgium.

The INR-NIR was housed in the Flagey Building, also known as "Radio House" (Maison de Radio), on Place Eugène Flagey, Ixelles in the south of Brussels. It was a purpose-built building in the "paquebot" style of Art Deco.

Although ceasing broadcasts at the time of the German invasion of Belgium in May 1940, the INR-NIR was subsequently revived in the postwar years. It later expanded its remit to include television broadcasts which commenced in Belgium in 1953. It was managed under the auspices of the Ministry for Post, Telegraph, and Telephone until 1959 and subsequently the Ministry of Cultural Affairs.

The INR-NIR was split along linguistic lines in 1960 with the creation of the Belgisch Radio en Televisie, Nederlandse Uitzendingen (BRT) and Radiodiffusion-Télévision Belge, Emissions françaises (RTB).

== Directors of the INR-NIR ==
- 1930–1937: Gust De Muynck
- 1937–1939: Theo De Ronde
- 1939–1952: Jan Boon
- 1952–1959: Bert Leysen

== See also ==
- Belgisch Radio en Televisie, Nederlandse Uitzendingen (BRT)
- Radiodiffusion-Télévision Belge, Emissions françaises (RTB)
