= 1956 in Italian television =

This is a list of Italian television related events from 1956.

== Events ==
- 26 January-5 February. The 1956 Winter Olympics in Cortina d'Ampezzo are the first major sport event covered by the RAI.
- 10 March - Franca Raimondi wins the 1956 Sanremo festival, hosted by Fausto Tommei, with Aprite le finestre; Tonina Torrielli is runner up with Amami se vuoi. The two female singers, both rookies, are selected to represent Italy at the 1956 Eurovision Song Contest.
- 18-19 Aprile: RAI broadcasts live, in Eurovision, the wedding of Rainier III and Grace Kelly.
- 24 May - Italy enters the Eurovision Song Contest for the first time with "Aprite le finestre", performed by Franca Raimondi and "Amami se vuoi", performed by Tonina Torrielli.
- 20 June - Resignation of Filiberto Guala, CEO of RAI since 1954. He was a skilled administrator, but considered controversial for the bigoted decency codes which he imposed on television. He was replaced by Marcello Rodinò. Guala was a fervent Catholic, and would later become a Trappist monk.
- 19 December - Birth of the company Il tempo TV, aiming to create of the first Italian commercial network. Its president is Renato Angiolillo, owner and director of the Roman right-wing newspaper Il Tempo. After a four-years-long legal battle, the project is definitively stopped by a sentence of the Constitutional Court.
- 31 December - The covering of the Italian territory by the TV signal is completed.

== Debuts ==
- L'amico degli animali (The animals' friend), hosted by Angelo Lombardi, educational show about zoology. The Lombardi's phrases "Hello, friends of my friends" and "Andalù, take it away", said to his African helper, become proverbial.

== Television shows ==
=== Drama ===
- Il sogno dello zio (Uncle's dream) by Gugliemo Morandi, adapted by Corrado Alvaro from Fyodor Dostoevskij's novella, with Margherita Bagni and Antonio Battistella.
- Charley’s aunt by Brandon Thomas, directed by Claudio Fino, with Ugo Tognazzi and Raffaele Pisu.
- Romance by Edward Sheldon, directed by Daniele D'Anza, with Lea Padovani and Paolo Carlini.
- The Bouligrin, satirical farce about the bourgeois marriage by Georges Courteline, directed by Antonello Falqui, with Bice Valori, Giarico Tedeschi and Alberto Bonucci
- I nostri figli (Our sons) by Ginetta Ortona, directed by Piero Turchetti, with Evi Maltagliati and Ivo Garrani; an happy middlec-class couple must face the unexpected death of the daughter's boyfriend. The play had won a RAI contest for the best TV script.

=== Miniseries ===
- L'alfiere (The ensign), by Anton Giulio Majano, from Carlo Alianello, historical novel about the Italian unification, seen on the side of the army of the Two Sicilies; to notice the presence, in small roles, of some future stars, as Domenico Modugno, Monica Vitti and Nino Manfredi.
- Cime tempestose (Wuthering Heights), by Mario Landi, from Emily Brontë, with Massimo Girotti as Heathcliff and Anna Maria Ferrero as Catherine Earnshaw.
- Il marziano Filippo (Filippo the Martian), by Cesare Emilio Gaslini, with Oreste Lionello, science-fiction miniserie for children; the plot is strangely similar to the E. T.’s one.

=== Variety ===
- Primo applauso (First applause), talent show, hosted by Enzo Tortora, who begins his long career as TV showman.
- Lui e lei (He and she) and Lui, lei e gli altri (He, she and the others), good-naturedly ironic varieties about the family life by Vito Molinari, with Nino Taranto (sided, respectively, by Delia Scala and Tina De Mola), written by Marcello Marchesi. and Vittorio Metz.
- Rascel la nuit by Romolo Siena, with Renato Rascel.
- La piazzetta (The little square), variety show, hosted by Riccardo Billi and Mario Riva. After three episodes, an exhibition of the dancer Alba Arnova with apparently bare legs (she wore a tight leotard) arouses L'Osservatore romano's protests and the show is deleted.

=== News and educational ===
- La strada è di tutti (The road is for everybody) educational show about road safety by Giuliano Tomei.

== Births ==
- 30 May – Piero Chiambretti, television presenter
- 7 August - Gerry Scotti, television presenter

== See also ==
- List of Italian films of 1956
