= Malombra =

Malombra may refer to:

- Malombra (novel), an 1881 novel by the writer Antonio Fogazzaro
- Malombra (1917 film), a silent Italian film directed by Carmine Gallone
- Malombra (1942 film), an Italian film directed by Mario Soldati
- Malombra (TV series), a 1974 Italian television series
- Malombra (1984 film), an Italian film directed by Bruno Gaburro
- Pietro Malombra (1556-1618), Italian painter
