= The Inn on Dartmoor =

1964 film

- Directed by: Rudolf Zehetgruber
- Written by: Egon Eis
- Based on: The Painted Dog by Victor Gunn
- Produced by: Gero Wecker
- Starring: Heinz Drache; Ingmar Zeisberg; Paul Klinger
- Cinematography: Werner M. Lenz
- Edited by: Wolfgang Wehrum
- Music by: Peter Thomas
- Production company: Arca-Winston Films
- Distributed by: Constantin Film
- Release date: 10 April 1964
- Running time: 90 minutes
- Country: West Germany
- Language: German

The Inn on Dartmoor (German: Das Wirtshaus von Dartmoor) is a 1964 West German mystery thriller film directed by Rudolf Zehetgruber and starring Heinz Drache, Ingmar Zeisberg and Paul Klinger. It was shot at the Arca Studios in West Berlin. The film's sets were designed by the art directors Ernst H. Albrecht and Max Vorwerg. It is an adaptation of the 1955 novel The Painted Dog by Victor Gunn. It was one of a number of British-set crime films that inspired by the popularity of Rialto Film's series of Edgar Wallace adaptations.

== Synopsis ==
Prisoners keep escaping from Dartmoor Prison in Devon, only to seemingly vanish into the wild landscape. Either they have disappeared into the famous bogs of the moor, or are being killed off by the secret criminal organisation they belong to. Private detective Anthony Nash arrives in the area to investigate, but attracts the suspicious attention of Inspector Cromwell of Scotland Yard.

== Cast ==
- Heinz Drache as Anthony Nash
- Ingmar Zeisberg as Evelyn Webster
- Paul Klinger as Inspektor Cromwell
- Judith Dornys as Joyce Trevor
- Friedrich Joloff as Mr. Simmons
- Mady Rahl as Mrs. Simmons
- Dieter Eppler as Mr. Gray
- Stanislav Ledinek as Billy
- Friedrich Schoenfelder as Sir James
- Gerd Frickhöffer as Fletcher
- Fritz Eberth as Trollope
- Kai Fischer as Bardame
- Ralf Wolter as O'Hara
- Heinrich Gies as Spitzel
- Gerhard Hartig as Ritchie

== Bibliography ==
- Goble, Alan. The Complete Index to Literary Sources in Film. Walter de Gruyter, 1999.
- Kramp, Joachim· Hallo! Hier spricht Edgar Wallace: die Geschichte der deutschen Kriminalfilmserie 1959–1972. Schwarzkopf & Schwarzkopf, 2001.
