= Ulrich Matschoss =

German actor (1917–2013)

- Born: 16 May 1917; Wanne-Eickel, Germany
- Died: 1 July 2013 (aged 96); Lüneburger Heide, Germany
- Other names: Ulrich Matschoß
- Occupation: Actor

Ulrich Matschoss (16 May 1917 – 1 July 2013) was a German actor.

== Personal life ==
Matschoss died on 1 July 2013 at the age of 96 at his home in Lüneburger Heide, Germany.

== Selected filmography ==
- 1959: Raskolnikov (TV film) ... Watch Master
- 1960: Stahlnetz: Die Zeugin im grünen Rock (TV series episode) ... Aufnahmeleiter im Tonstudio
- 1962: The Counterfeit Traitor ... Bespectacled Suspect at Gestapo H.O.
- 1966: Three Sisters (TV film) ... Andrei Sergeyevich Prozorov
- 1967: The Death of Ivan Ilyich (TV film) ... Ivan Ilyich
- 1971: The Eddie Chapman Story (TV film) as Inspector
- 1981–1991: Tatort (TV series, 15 episodes) ... Kriminaloberrat Karl Königsberg
- 1986: Engels & Consorten (TV miniseries) ... Carl Engels
- 1989–1990: Mit Leib und Seele (TV series, 19 episodes) ... Wilhelm Dannecker
- 1994–1998: Hallo, Onkel Doc! (TV series, 68 episodes) ... Professor Hermann Lüders
- 1997: Red Corner ... Gerhardt Hoffman
- 1999–2000: Die Kommissarin (TV series, 12 episodes) ... Paul Hagemann
- 2000: Schimanski muss leiden (TV series episode) ... Kriminaloberrat Karl Königsberg
