= 11 Uhr 20 =

- Written by: Herbert Reinecker
- Directed by: Wolfgang Becker
- Starring: Joachim Fuchsberger; Christiane Krüger; Götz George; Anthony Steel; Gila von Weitershausen; Nadja Tiller; Esther Ofarim; Muzaffer Tema; Peter Carsten; Ann Smyrner; Vadim Glowna; Jochen Busse; Werner Bruhns; Friedrich Joloff
- Theme music composer: Peter Thomas
- Country of origin: West Germany
- Original language: German

Production
- Producer: Helmut Ringelmann
- Cinematography: Rolf Kästel; Rüdiger Meichsner
- Running time: c. 200 minutes

Original release
- Release: 8 January – 11 January 1970

11 Uhr 20 is a West German crime television miniseries in three episodes, each having a length of about 60 minutes. It was written by Herbert Reinecker, directed by Wolfgang Becker and produced by Helmut Ringelmann. The episodes were shown in colour on the ZDF channel in January 1970.

== Plot ==
A married couple, the Wassems, are having a vacation in Turkey. One day they find a dead man in their car. Soon after this Mrs. Wassem dies in a car crash. The widowed Thomas Wassem, suspected of murder by the police, sets out to investigate the case on his own. His quest to find the real culprit takes him as far afield as Tunisia.

== Cast ==
- Joachim Fuchsberger as Thomas Wassem
- Werner Bruhns as Minotti
- Friedrich Joloff as Dr. Arnold Vogt
- Götz George as Muller
