= Italy in the Eurovision Song Contest =

- Eurovision Song Contest
- Participating broadcaster: Radiotelevisione italiana (RAI)

Participation summary
- Appearances: 52
- First appearance: 1956
- Highest placement: 1st: 1964, 1990, 2021
- Host: 1965, 1991, 2022
- Participation history: 1956; 1957; 1958; 1959; 1960; 1961; 1962; 1963; 1964; 1965; 1966; 1967; 1968; 1969; 1970; 1971; 1972; 1973; 1974; 1975; 1976; 1977; 1978; 1979; 1980; 1981; 1982; 1983; 1984; 1985; 1986; 1987; 1988; 1989; 1990; 1991; 1992; 1993; 1994; 1995; 1996; 1997; 1998 – 2010; 2011; 2012; 2013; 2014; 2015; 2016; 2017; 2018; 2019; ~~2020~~; 2021; 2022; 2023; 2024; 2025; 2026; 2027

Related articles
- Sanremo Music Festival; Canzonissima

External links
- RAI page
- Italy's page at Eurovision.com
- For the most recent participation see Italy in the Eurovision Song Contest 2026

Italy has been represented at the Eurovision Song Contest 51 times since making its debut as one of only seven countries to compete at the first contest in 1956, which took inspiration from the Sanremo Music Festival. The Italian participating broadcaster in the contest is Radiotelevisione italiana (RAI). It competed at the contest without interruption until 1980, discontinuing its participation on a number of occasions during the 1980s and 1990s. After a 13-year absence starting in 1998, the country returned to the contest in 2011. Italy has won the contest three times, along with an additional 16 top-five finishes. Italy hosted the contest in Naples (1965), Rome (1991), and Turin (2022).

In 1958, "Nel blu, dipinto di blu" performed by Domenico Modugno finished third. Commonly known as "Volare", the song became a huge international hit, topping the US Billboard Hot 100 and winning two Grammy Awards at its first edition. "Uno per tutte" by Emilio Pericoli also finished third in 1963, before Italy won for the first time in 1964 with "Non ho l'età" by Gigliola Cinquetti. Cinquetti returned to the contest in 1974 and finished second with "Sì", losing to "Waterloo" by ABBA. Italy then finished third in 1975 with "Era" by Wess and Dori Ghezzi. The country's best result of the 1980s was "Gente di mare" by Umberto Tozzi and Raf finishing third in 1987. Italy's second victory in the contest came in 1990 with "Insieme: 1992" by Toto Cutugno. Other good 1990s results were "Rapsodia" by Mia Martini in 1992 and "Fiumi di parole" by Jalisse in 1997, which both finished fourth. After 1997, Italy withdrew from the competition.

On 31 December 2010, the European Broadcasting Union (EBU) announced that Italy would be returning to the contest as part of the "Big Five", thereby granting the country automatic qualification for the final. Italy's return to the contest has proved to be successful, finishing in the top ten in 13 of the last 15 contests (2011–26), including second places for "Madness of Love" by Raphael Gualazzi (2011) and "Soldi" by Mahmood (2019), and third place for "Grande amore" by Il Volo (2015). "Grande amore" won the televote, receiving votes from all countries, but came sixth with the juries. This was the first time since the introduction of the mixed jury/televote system in 2009 that the televote winner did not end up winning the contest. Italy achieved its third victory in the contest in 2021, with "Zitti e buoni" by the rock band Måneskin.

== History ==
Radiotelevisione italiana (RAI) is a full member of the European Broadcasting Union (EBU), thus eligible to participate in the Eurovision Song Contest. It has participated in the contest representing Italy since its first edition in 1956.

=== Absences ===
Italy has withdrawn from the Eurovision Song Contest a number of times. The first withdrawal was in 1981, when RAI stated that interest had diminished in the country. This absence continued through 1982, before Italy returned in 1983. Italy again withdrew in 1986 when RAI decided not to enter the contest. From 1994 to 1996, Italy withdrew again, with RAI citing a lack of interest in participating. Italy returned in 1997, before withdrawing again without explanation, and the country did not participate again until 2011.

None of the 20th century Eurovision-winning songs were particularly successful in the Italian charts. "Non ho l'età" by Gigliola Cinquetti was a hit in February 1964 when the song won the 1964 contest, but according to the official "Hit Parade Italia" website, "Waterloo", "Ding-a-dong", "Puppet on a String", "Save Your Kisses for Me" and even Italy's own winning entry of 1990, "Insieme: 1992", all failed to enter the top ten of the records sales charts. A notable exception to this rule was the 1984 entry "I treni di Tozeur" by Alice and Franco Battiato, which shared fifth place in the final, but still became a #3 hit in Italy and also placed at #20 on the chart of the best-selling Italian singles in 1984.

=== TV censorship of the 1974 contest ===
RAI refused to broadcast the 1974 contest live because their competing song, sung by Gigliola Cinquetti, coincided with the intense political campaigning for the 1974 Italian divorce referendum which was to be held a month later in May. Despite the Eurovision Song Contest taking place more than a month before the planned vote, Italian censors refused to allow the contest and song to be shown or heard. RAI censors felt that the song, titled "Sì" (Yes), and contained lyrics constantly repeating the aforementioned word could be subject to accusation of being subliminal messaging and a form of propaganda to influence the Italian voting public to vote 'yes' in the referendum (thus to repeal the law that allowed divorce). The song thus remained censored on most Italian state TV and radio stations for over a month. At the contest in Brighton, Cinquetti finished second, losing to ABBA. "Sì" went on to be a UK top ten hit, peaking at number eight. It also reached the German top 20. The contest was broadcast in June.

=== The 2008–2010 period ===
In 2008, two notable Italian musicians, Vince Tempera (who was the conductor for Malta in 1975 and had helped San Marino take part in the ESC in 2008) and Eurovision winner Toto Cutugno expressed their sorrow at Italy's non-participation and called for the country to return to the contest.

Contestants from the 2008 contest, starting with the winner Dima Bilan appeared on the Italian show Carramba! Che fortuna, hosted by Raffaella Carrà on Rai Uno. Whether this was an initiative by Carrà (who presented in spring three shows in TVE concerning the event, including the national final) to try to bring Eurovision back to Italy is not clear, but Sietse Bakker, then-Manager Communications & PR of the Eurovision Song Contest, reiterated that "Italy is still very much welcome to take part in the competition."

Shortly after revealing the list of participants for the 2009 contest, the EBU announced that they would work harder to bring Italy back into the contest, along with former participants Monaco and Austria.

=== Return (2011–present) ===
At a press conference presenting the fourth edition of the Italian X Factor, Rai 2 director Massimo Liofredi announced that the winner of the competition might advance to represent Italy in the Eurovision Song Contest, rather than participate in the Sanremo Festival, as in previous years. On 2 December 2010, it was officially announced by the EBU that Italy had applied to compete in the 2011 contest. Their participation was further confirmed on 31 December with the announcement of the official participant list.

In 2011, Raphael Gualazzi finished second, then Italy's best result since 1990. Italy came first with the jury vote, but only 11th in the televote to place second overall. Nina Zilli in 2012 and Marco Mengoni in 2013 placed in the top ten (ninth and seventh, respectively); the latter scored 126 points, exactly doubling the points total of the other "Big Five" countries that year.

This trend came to a stop in 2014, when internally-selected Emma Marrone finished in 21st place. In 2015, Il Volo finished third with 292 points placing first in the televote but sixth in the jury vote. Since the introduction of the 50/50 split voting system, this was the first time that the televote winner did not win the contest overall. Francesca Michielin, selected among the competitors of Sanremo 2016 after the waiver of the winners Stadio, ended in 16th place. Francesco Gabbani came in sixth place in 2017. In 2018, although not initially a big favourite with the bookmakers, Ermal Meta and Fabrizio Moro returned Italy to the top five, aided significantly by finishing third in the televote, which heavily counterbalanced the 17th place by the jury, finishing fifth overall.

Italy's best result since returning to the competition to that point came in 2019, when Mahmood placed second with 472 points. It was followed up, after the 2020 cancellation, by Måneskin's victory in the 2021 contest with 524 points, marking Italy's third win as well as breaking the band onto the international music scene. Mahmood returned in 2022 as the host entrant alongside Blanco, placing sixth, followed by Mengoni returning in 2023, placing fourth, Angelina Mango placing seventh in 2024, Lucio Corsi (selected as the runner-up of Sanremo 2025 after the waiver of the winner Olly) placing fifth, and Sal Da Vinci also placing fifth in 2026.

== Sanremo Music Festival ==
The Sanremo Music Festival is the most popular Italian song contest and awards ceremony, held annually in the city of Sanremo, Liguria. First held in 1951 and itself the basis and inspiration for the Eurovision Song Contest, the festival has often been used as a method of choosing the Italian entry for the European contest, with some exceptions over the years. From 2015 to 2026, the winner of the festival was given the right of first refusal to represent Italy in the contest. In 2027, the festival will dedicate its fourth night to selecting the Italian entry.

== Italy and the "Big" countries ==
Since 1999, four countries – France, Germany, Spain, and the United Kingdom – have automatically qualified for the Eurovision final regardless of their results in previous contests. The participating broadcasters from these countries earned this special status by being the four biggest financial contributors to the EBU, and subsequently became known as the "Big Four". In a meeting with OGAE Serbia in 2007, then-executive supervisor of the contest Svante Stockselius stated that, if Italy were to return to the contest in the future, the country would also automatically qualify for the final, becoming part of a "Big Five". However, with the official announcement of the return of Italy, it was not confirmed whether the country would compete in one of the two semi-finals or be part of the "Big Five", as RAI, third largest contributor to the EBU, had not applied for "Big Five" membership. On 31 December 2010, it was announced that Italy would take part in the 2011 contest and confirmed that the country would automatically qualify for the final as part of the "Big Five".

Italy is currently the most successful Big Five country in the Eurovision Song Contest following the introduction of the rule, finishing in the top ten in 13 of the last 15 contests (2011–2026), including a victory for Måneskin (2021), second places for Raphael Gualazzi (2011) and Mahmood (2019), and third place for Il Volo (2015). It is one of the only two countries of the Big Five – since it was introduced – to have won, the other being Germany in 2010.

== Participation overview ==
Table key
1	First place
2	Second place
3	Third place
◁	Last place
◇	Entry selected but did not compete
†	Upcoming event

Year	Artist	Song	Language	Final	Points	Semi	Points
1956	Franca Raimondi	"Aprite le finestre"	Italian	—N/a (Note: The 1956 contest had secret voting and, apart from the winner, no results were released.)	—N/a	No semi-finals	
1956	Tonina Torrielli	"Amami se vuoi"	Italian	—N/a	—N/a	No semi-finals	
1957	Nunzio Gallo	"Corde della mia chitarra"	Italian	6	7	No semi-finals	
1958	Domenico Modugno	"Nel blu, dipinto di blu"	Italian	3	13	No semi-finals	
1959	Domenico Modugno	"Piove"	Italian	6	9	No semi-finals	
1960	Renato Rascel	"Romantica"	Italian	8	5	No semi-finals	
1961	Betty Curtis	"Al di là"	Italian	5	12	No semi-finals	
1962	Claudio Villa	"Addio, addio"	Italian	9	3	No semi-finals	
1963	Emilio Pericoli	"Uno per tutte"	Italian	3	37	No semi-finals	
1964	Gigliola Cinquetti	"Non ho l'età"	Italian	1	49	No semi-finals	
1965	Bobby Solo	"Se piangi, se ridi"	Italian	5	15	No semi-finals	
1966	Domenico Modugno	"Dio, come ti amo"	Italian	17 ◁	0	No semi-finals	
1967	Claudio Villa	"Non andare più lontano"	Italian	11	4	No semi-finals	
1968	Sergio Endrigo	"Marianne"	Italian	10	7	No semi-finals	
1969	Iva Zanicchi	"Due grosse lacrime bianche"	Italian	13	5	No semi-finals	
1970	Gianni Morandi	"Occhi di ragazza"	Italian	8	5	No semi-finals	
1971	Massimo Ranieri	"L'amore è un attimo"	Italian	5	91	No semi-finals	
1972	Nicola Di Bari	"I giorni dell'arcobaleno"	Italian	6	92	No semi-finals	
1973	Massimo Ranieri	"Chi sarà con te"	Italian	13	74	No semi-finals	
1974	Gigliola Cinquetti	"Sì"	Italian	2	18	No semi-finals	
1975	Wess and Dori Ghezzi	"Era"	Italian	3	115	No semi-finals	
1976	Romina and Al Bano	"We'll Live It All Again"	English, Italian	7	69	No semi-finals	
1977	Mia Martini	"Libera"	Italian	13	33	No semi-finals	
1978	Ricchi e Poveri	"Questo amore"	Italian	12	53	No semi-finals	
1979	Matia Bazar	"Raggio di luna"	Italian	15	27	No semi-finals	
1980	Alan Sorrenti	"Non so che darei"	Italian	6	87	No semi-finals	
1983	Riccardo Fogli	"Per Lucia"	Italian	11	41	No semi-finals	
1984	Alice and Franco Battiato	"I treni di Tozeur"	Italian	5	70	No semi-finals	
1985	Al Bano and Romina Power	"Magic Oh Magic"	Italian, English	7	78	No semi-finals	
1987	Umberto Tozzi and Raf	"Gente di mare"	Italian	3	103	No semi-finals	
1988	Luca Barbarossa	"Ti scrivo"	Italian	12	52	No semi-finals	
1989	Anna Oxa and Fausto Leali	"Avrei voluto"	Italian	9	56	No semi-finals	
1990	Toto Cutugno	"Insieme: 1992"	Italian	1	149	No semi-finals	
1991	Peppino di Capri	"Comme è ddoce 'o mare"	Neapolitan	7	89	No semi-finals	
1992	Mia Martini	"Rapsodia"	Italian	4	111	No semi-finals	
1993	Enrico Ruggeri	"Sole d'Europa"	Italian	12	45	Kvalifikacija za Millstreet	
1997	Jalisse	"Fiumi di parole"	Italian	4	114	No semi-finals	
2011	Raphael Gualazzi	"Madness of Love"	Italian, English	2	189	Member of the "Big Five"	
2012	Nina Zilli	"L'amore è femmina (Out of Love)"	English, Italian	9	101	Member of the "Big Five"	
2013	Marco Mengoni	"L'essenziale"	Italian	7	126	Member of the "Big Five"	
2014	Emma	"La mia città"	Italian	21	33	Member of the "Big Five"	
2015	Il Volo	"Grande amore"	Italian	3	292	Member of the "Big Five"	
2016	Francesca Michielin	"No Degree of Separation"	Italian, English	16	124	Member of the "Big Five"	
2017	Francesco Gabbani	"Occidentali's Karma"	Italian	6	334	Member of the "Big Five"	
2018	Ermal Meta and Fabrizio Moro	"Non mi avete fatto niente"	Italian	5	308	Member of the "Big Five"	
2019	Mahmood	"Soldi"	Italian	2	472	Member of the "Big Five"	
2020	Diodato ◇	"Fai rumore" ◇	Italian ◇	Contest cancelled (Note: The 2020 contest was cancelled due to the COVID-19 pandemic.)		Member of the "Big Five"	
2021	Måneskin	"Zitti e buoni"	Italian	1	524	Member of the "Big Five"	
2022	Mahmood and Blanco	"Brividi"	Italian	6	268	Member of the "Big Five"; Host country	
2023	Marco Mengoni	"Due vite"	Italian	4	350	Member of the "Big Five"	
2024	Angelina Mango	"La noia"	Italian	7	268	Member of the "Big Five"	
2025	Lucio Corsi	"Volevo essere un duro"	Italian	5	256	Member of the "Big Five"	
2026	Sal Da Vinci	"Per sempre sì"	Italian, Neapolitan	5	281	Member of the "Big Four"	
2027	TBD 19 February 2027 †			Upcoming †		Member of the "Big Four"	

=== Congratulations: 50 Years of the Eurovision Song Contest ===
Artist	Song	Language	At Congratulations				At Eurovision		
Artist	Song	Language	Final	Points	Semi	Points	Year	Place	Points
Domenico Modugno	"Nel blu, dipinto di blu"	Italian	2	267	2	200	1958	3	13

== Hostings ==
Year	Location	Venue	Presenters
1965	Naples	Auditorium RAI	Renata Mauro
1991	Rome	Teatro 15 di Cinecittà	Gigliola Cinquetti and Toto Cutugno
2022	Turin	PalaOlimpico	Alessandro Cattelan, Laura Pausini and Mika

== Awards ==
=== Marcel Bezençon Awards ===
Year	Category	Song	Performer	Final	Points	Host city	Ref.
2015	Press Award	"Grande amore"	Il Volo	3	292	(Austria) Vienna	
2017	Press Award	"Occidentali's Karma"	Francesco Gabbani	6	334	(Ukraine) Kyiv	
2019	Composer Award	"Soldi"	Mahmood	2	465	(Israel) Tel Aviv	
2023	Composer Award	"Due vite"	Marco Mengoni	4	350	(United Kingdom) Liverpool	

=== Winner by OGAE members ===
Year	Song	Performer	Final result	Points	Host city	Ref.
2015	"Grande amore"	Il Volo	3	292	(Austria) Vienna	
2017	"Occidentali's Karma"	Francesco Gabbani	6	334	(Ukraine) Kyiv	
2019	"Soldi"	Mahmood	2	465	(Israel) Tel Aviv	

== Related involvement ==
=== Conductors ===
Year	Eurovision Conductor	Musical Director	Notes	Ref.
1956	Gian Stellari	N/A		
1957	Armando Trovajoli	N/A		
1958	(Italy) (United Kingdom) Alberto Semprini	N/A		
1959	William Galassini	N/A		
1960	Cinico Angelini	N/A		
1961	Gianfranco Intra	N/A		
1962	Cinico Angelini	N/A		
1963	Gigi Chichellero	N/A		
1964	Gianfranco Monaldi	N/A		
1965	Gianni Ferrio		(Note: Ferrio also conducted the Austrian and Irish entries)	
1966	Angelo Giacomazzi	N/A	(Note: Giacomazzi was originally brought in to conduct the Italian entry, but the Luxembourgish orchestra didn't perform it to singer Domenico Modugno's satisfaction. The Italian performance was then accompanied by a small ensemble of musicians, with Giacomazzi playing the piano. Therefore, the Italian entry didn't technically feature the orchestra, but Giacomazzi was still credited as the entry's conductor.)	
1967	Giancarlo Chiaramello	N/A		
1968	Giancarlo Chiaramello	N/A		
1969	Ezio Leoni	N/A		
1970	Mario Capuano	N/A		
1971	Enrico Polito	N/A		
1972	Gian Franco Reverberi	N/A		
1973	Enrico Polito	N/A		
1974	Gianfranco Monaldi	N/A		
1975	Natale Massara	N/A		
1976	Maurizio Fabrizio	N/A		
1977	Maurizio Fabrizio	N/A		
1978	Nicola Samale	N/A		
1979	No conductor	N/A	(Note: The Italian entry was performed without orchestral accompaniment.)	
1980	(United Kingdom) Del Newman	N/A		
1983	Maurizio Fabrizio	N/A		
1984	Giusto Pio	N/A		
1985	Fiorenzo Zanotti	N/A		
1987	Gianfranco Lombardi	N/A		
1988	No conductor	N/A		
1989	Mario Natale	N/A		
1990	Gianni Madonini	N/A		
1991	Bruno Canfora			
1992	Marco Falagiani	N/A		
1993	Vittorio Cosma	N/A		
1997	Lucio Fabbri	N/A		

=== Heads of delegation ===
Each participating broadcaster in the Eurovision Song Contest assigns a head of delegation as the EBU's contact person and the leader of their delegation at the event. The delegation, whose size can greatly vary, includes a head of press, the performers, songwriters, composers, and backing vocalists, among others.

Year	Head of delegation	Ref.
2011–2019	Nicola Caligiore	
2020–2021	Simona Martorelli	
2022–present	Mariangela Borneo	

=== Commentators and spokespersons ===
Television and radio commentators and spokespersons
Year	Television		Radio		Spokesperson	Ref.
Year	Channel	Commentator(s)	Channel	Commentator(s)	Spokesperson	Ref.
1956	RAI Televisione	Franco Marazzi	Secondo Programma	Unknown	No spokesperson	
1957	RAI Televisione	Adriana Alberti	Secondo Programma	Unknown	Unknown	
1958	RAI Televisione	Bianca Maria Piccinino	Secondo Programma	Bianca Maria Piccinino	Unknown	
1959	RAI Televisione	Renato Tagliani	Secondo Programma	Renato Tagliani	Unknown	
1960	RAI Televisione	Giorgio Porro	Secondo Programma	Giorgio Porro	Unknown	
1961	RAI Televisione	Corrado Mantoni	Secondo Programma	Corrado Mantoni	Unknown	
1962	Programma Nazionale TV	Renato Tagliani	No radio broadcast		Unknown	
1963	Programma Nazionale TV	Renato Tagliani	No radio broadcast		Unknown	
1964	Programma Nazionale TV	Renato Tagliani	No radio broadcast		Unknown	
1965	Programma Nazionale TV	Renato Tagliani	Secondo Programma	Renato Tagliani	Unknown	
1966	Secondo Programma TV	Renato Tagliani	No radio broadcast		Unknown	
1967	Secondo Programma TV	Renato Tagliani	No radio broadcast		Unknown	
1968	Secondo Programma TV	Renato Tagliani	No radio broadcast		Unknown	
1969	Secondo Programma TV	Renato Tagliani	No radio broadcast		Unknown	
1970	Secondo Programma TV	Renato Tagliani	No radio broadcast		Unknown	
1971	Programma Nazionale TV	Renato Tagliani	Secondo Programma	Renato Tagliani	No spokesperson	
1972	Programma Nazionale TV	Renato Tagliani	Secondo Programma	Renato Tagliani	No spokesperson	
1973	Programma Nazionale TV	Renato Tagliani	No radio broadcast		No spokesperson	
1974	Secondo Programma TV	Rosanna Vaudetti	Secondo Programma	Rosanna Vaudetti	Unknown	
1975	Programma Nazionale TV	Silvio Noto	Secondo Programma	Silvio Noto	Unknown	
1976	Rete Uno	Silvio Noto	No radio broadcast		Unknown	
1977	Rete Uno	Silvio Noto	No radio broadcast		Unknown	
1978	Rete Due	Tullio Grazzini	Rai Radio 2	Tullio Grazzini	Unknown	
1979	Rete Uno	Rosanna Vaudetti	No radio broadcast		Unknown	
1980	Rete Due	Michele Gammino	No radio broadcast		Unknown	
1981–1982	No broadcast				Did not participate	
1983	Rete Uno	Paolo Frajese	No radio broadcast		Unknown	
1984	Rai Due	Antonio De Robertis	RaiStereoUno	Antonio De Robertis	Unknown	
1985	Rai Due	Rosanna Vaudetti	RaiStereoUno	Unknown	Unknown	
1986	Telepordenone	Unknown	No radio broadcast		Did not participate	
1987	Rai Due	Rosanna Vaudetti	No radio broadcast		Unknown	
1988	Rai Tre	Daniele Piombi	No radio broadcast		Unknown	
1989	Rai Uno	Gabriella Carlucci	No radio broadcast		Unknown	
1990	Rai Due	Peppi Franzelin	No radio broadcast		Unknown	
1991	Rai Uno	No commentary	No radio broadcast		Rosanna Vaudetti	
1992	Rai Due	Peppi Franzelin	No radio broadcast		Unknown	
1993	RAI Uno	Ettore Andenna	No radio broadcast		Unknown	
1994–1996	No broadcast				Did not participate	
1997	RAI Uno	Ettore Andenna	No radio broadcast		Peppi Franzelin	
1998–2002	No broadcast				Did not participate	
2003	GAY.tv	Fabio Canino and Paolo Quilici	No radio broadcast		Did not participate	
2004–2010	No broadcast				Did not participate	
2011	Rai 5 (SF2); Rai 2 (final)	Raffaella Carrà and Bob Sinclar	Rai Radio 2 (SF2)	Raffaella Carrà and Bob Sinclar	Raffaella Carrà	
2012	Rai 5 (SF1); Rai 2 (final)	Federica Gentile (SF1); Marco Ardemagni and Filippo Solibello (final)	No radio broadcast		Ivan Bacchi	
2013	Rai 5 (SF1); Rai 2 (final)	Federica Gentile (SF1); Filippo Solibello, Marco Ardemagni and Natascha Lusenti	No radio broadcast		Federica Gentile	
2014	Rai 4 (semi-finals); Rai 2 (Final)	Marco Ardemagni and Filippo Solibello (semi-finals); Linus and Nicola Savino (Final)	No radio broadcast		Linus	
2015	Rai 4 (semi-finals); Rai 2, Rai HD (final)	Marco Ardemagni and Filippo Solibello (semi-finals); Federico Russo and Valentina Correani (final)	Rai Radio 2	Marco Ardemagni and Filippo Solibello	Federico Russo	
2016	Rai 4 (semi-finals); Rai 1 (final)	Marco Ardemagni and Filippo Solibello (semi-finals); Flavio Insinna and Federico Russo (final)	Rai Radio 2	Marco Ardemagni and Filippo Solibello	Claudia Andreatti	
2017	Rai 4 (semi-finals); Rai 1 (final)	Andrea Delogu and Diego Passoni (semi-finals); Flavio Insinna and Federico Russo (final)	No radio broadcast		Giulia Valentina Palermo	
2018	Rai 4 (semi-finals); Rai 1 (final)	Carolina Di Domenico and Saverio Raimondo (semi-finals); Serena Rossi and Federico Russo (Final)	Rai Radio 2 (final)	Carolina Di Domenico and Ema Stokholma	Giulia Valentina Palermo	
2019	Rai 4 (semi-finals); Rai 1 (final)	Ema Stokholma (semi-finals); Flavio Insinna (final); Federico Russo (all shows)	Rai Radio 2 (final)	Federico Russo (Semi-finals); Gino Castaldo (Final); Ema Stokholma (All shows)	Ema Stokholma	
~~2020~~	~~Rai 4 (semi-finals)~~ ~~Rai 1 (final)~~	Not announced before cancellation	~~Rai Radio 2 (final)~~	Not announced before cancellation		
2021	Rai 4 (Semi-finals); Rai 1 (Final)	Ema Stokholma and Saverio Raimondo (semi-finals); Gabriele Corsi and Cristiano Malgioglio (final)	Rai Radio 2 (final)	Saverio Raimondo (Semi-finals); Gino Castaldo (Final); Ema Stokholma (All shows)	Carolina Di Domenico	
2022	Rai 1, Rai 4K, Rai Italia	Gabriele Corsi, Cristiano Malgioglio and Carolina Di Domenico	Rai Radio 2	Ema Stokholma, Gino Castaldo and Saverio Raimondo	Carolina Di Domenico	
2022	RaiPlay	The Jackal	Rai Radio 2	Ema Stokholma, Gino Castaldo and Saverio Raimondo	Carolina Di Domenico	
2023	Rai 2 (semi-finals); Rai 1 (final)	Gabriele Corsi and Mara Maionchi	Rai Radio 2	Mariolina Simone, Diletta Parlangeli and Saverio Raimondo	Kaze	
2024	Rai 2 (semi-finals); Rai 1 (final)	Gabriele Corsi and Mara Maionchi	Rai Radio 2	Diletta Parlangeli and Matteo Osso	Mario Acampa	
2025	Rai 2 (semi-finals); Rai 1 (final)	Gabriele Corsi and BigMama	Rai Radio 2	Diletta Parlangeli and Matteo Osso	Topo Gigio	
2026	Rai 2 (semi-finals); Rai 1 (final)	Gabriele Corsi and Elettra Lamborghini	Rai Radio 2	Diletta Parlangeli and Matteo Osso	Mariasole Pollio	

==== Other shows ====
Show	Commentator(s)	Channel(s)	Ref.
Eurovision: Europe Shine a Light	Flavio Insinna and Federico Russo	Rai 1	
Eurovision: Europe Shine a Light	Gino Castaldo and Ema Stokholma	Rai 4 Rai Radio 2	

== Photo gallery ==
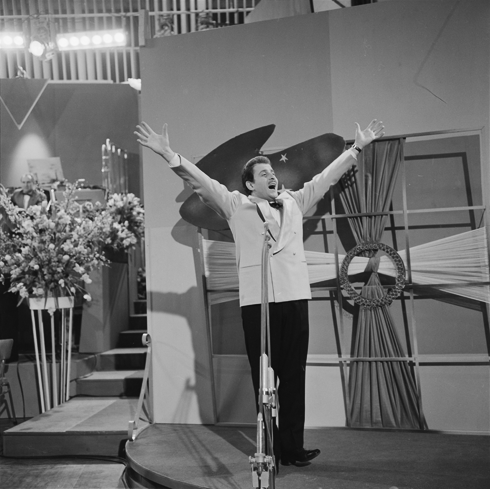
Domenico Modugno in Hilversum (1958)

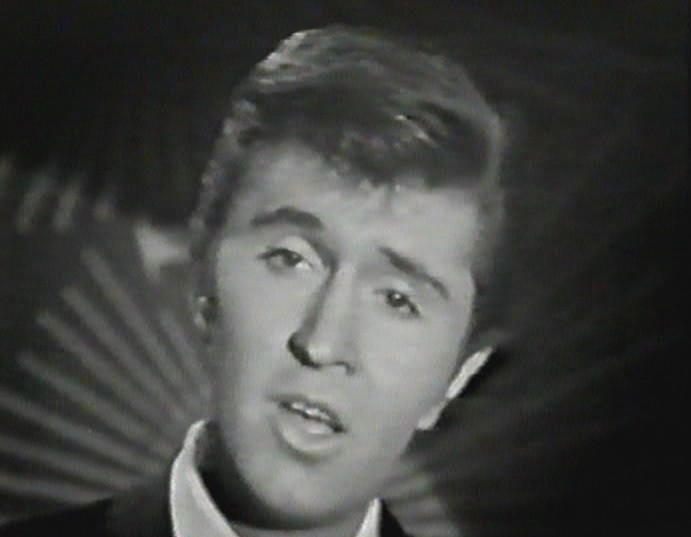
Bobby Solo in Naples (1965)

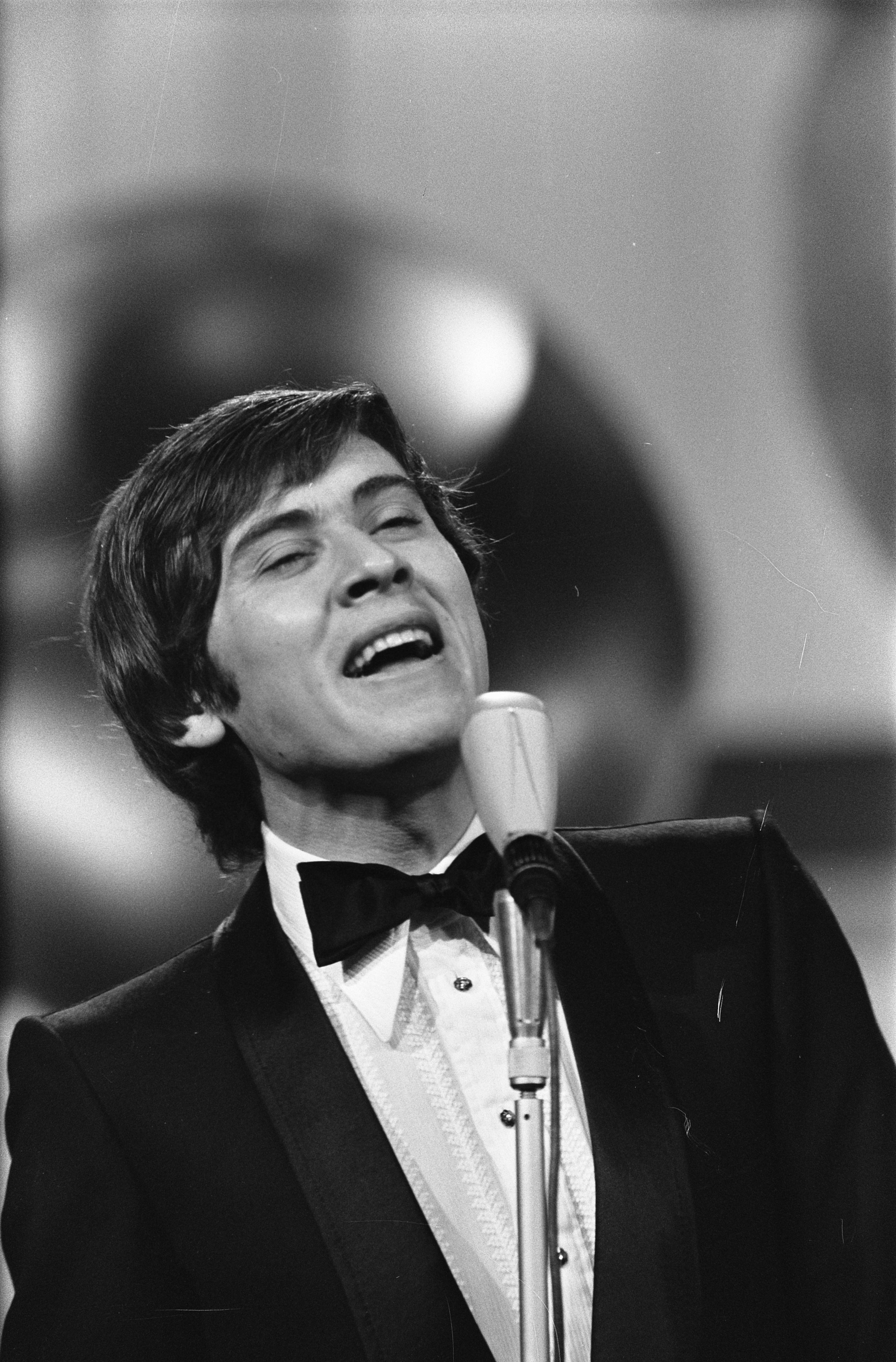
Gianni Morandi in Amsterdam (1970)

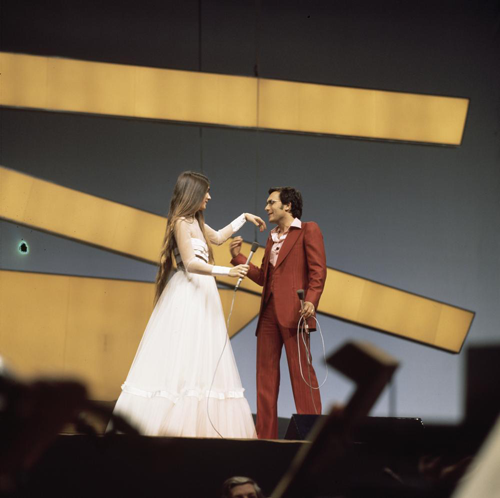
Al Bano and Romina Power in The Hague (1976)

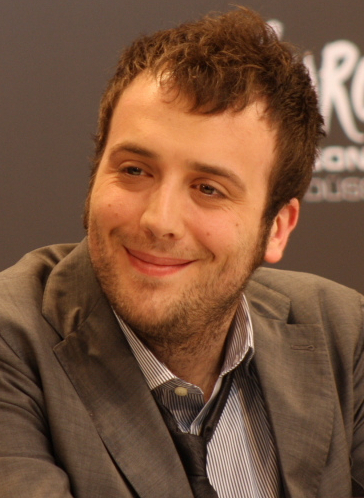
Raphael Gualazzi in Düsseldorf (2011)

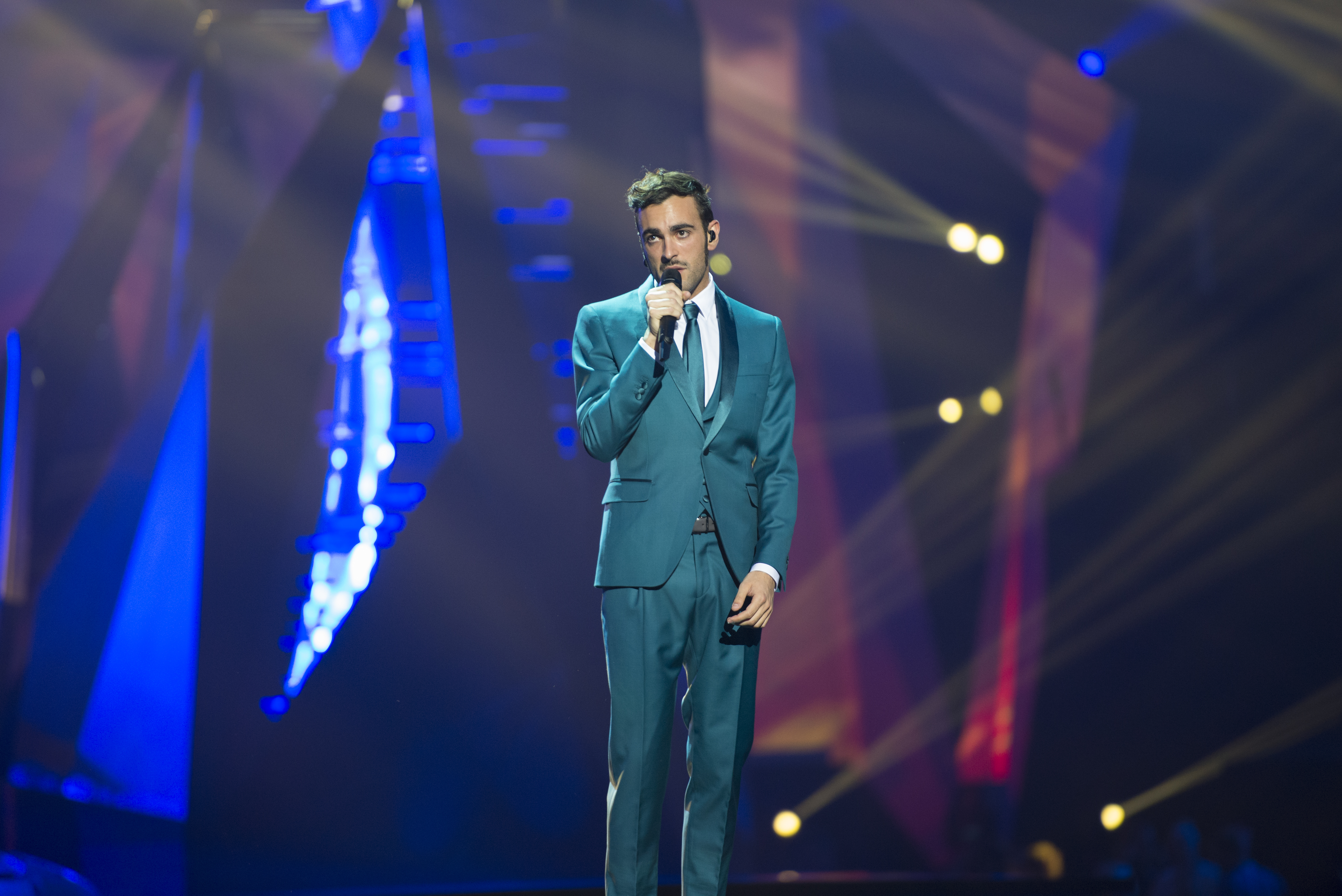
Marco Mengoni in Malmö (2013)

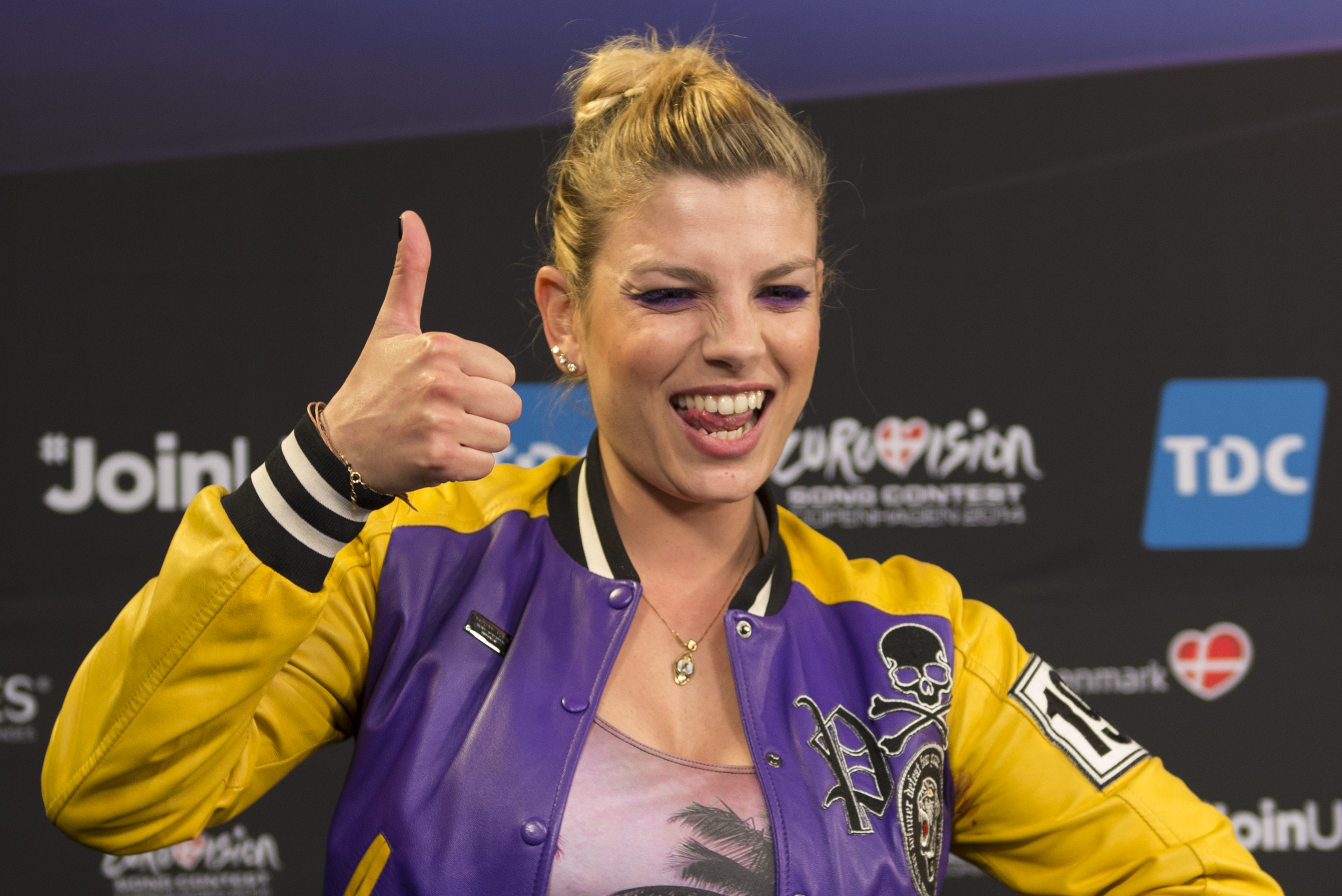
Emma in Copenhagen (2014)

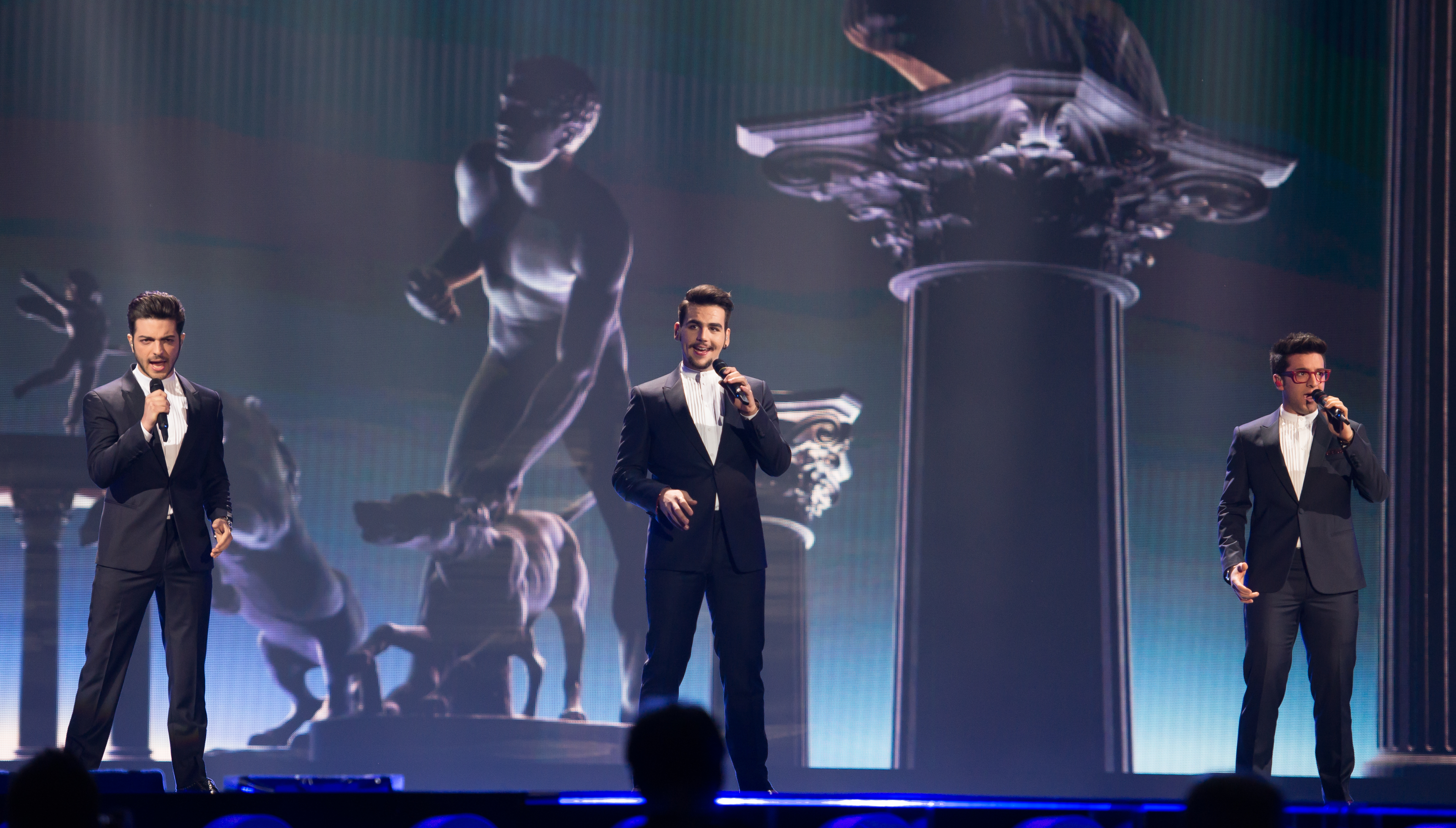
Il Volo in Vienna (2015)

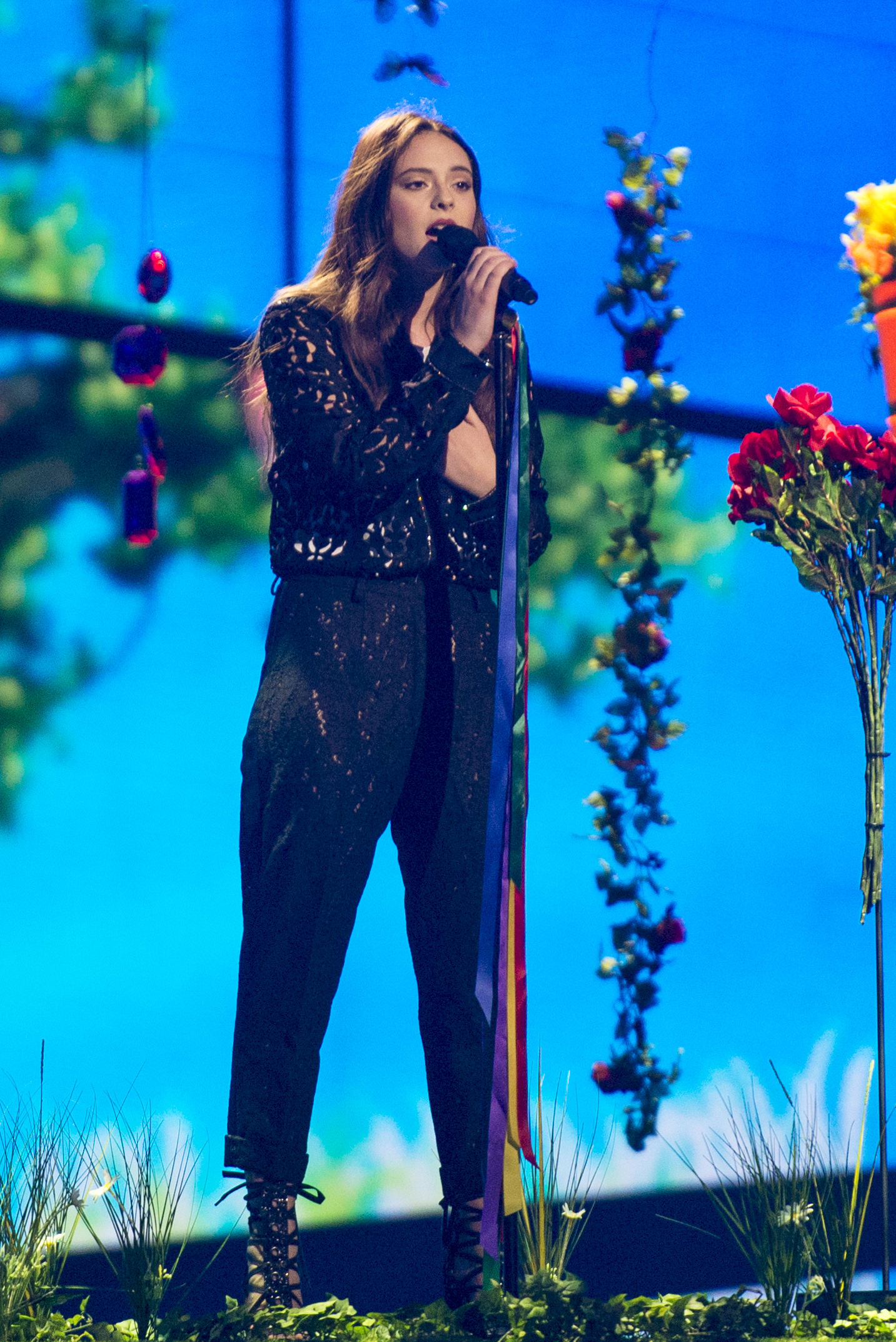
Francesca Michielin in Stockholm (2016)

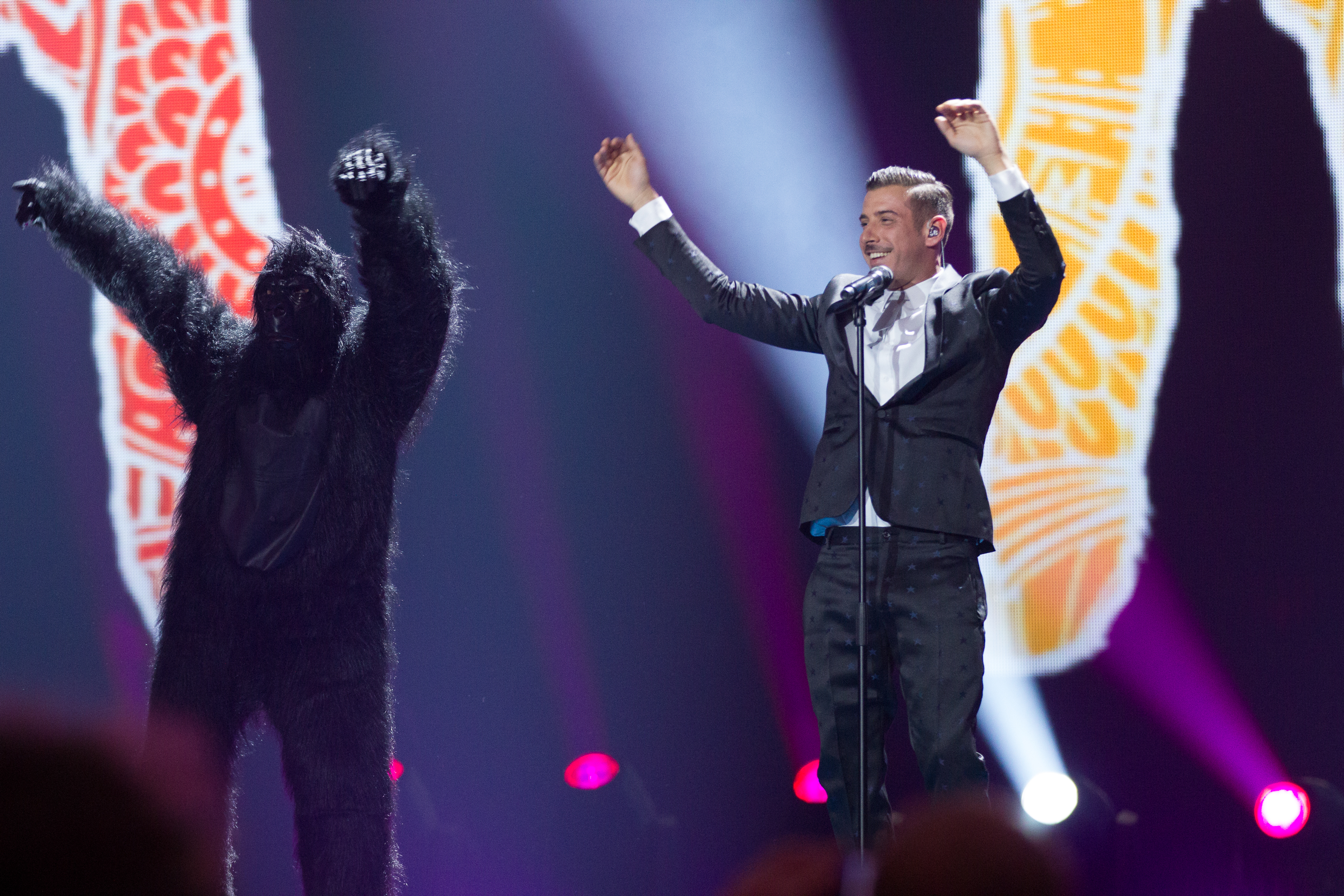
Francesco Gabbani in Kyiv (2017)

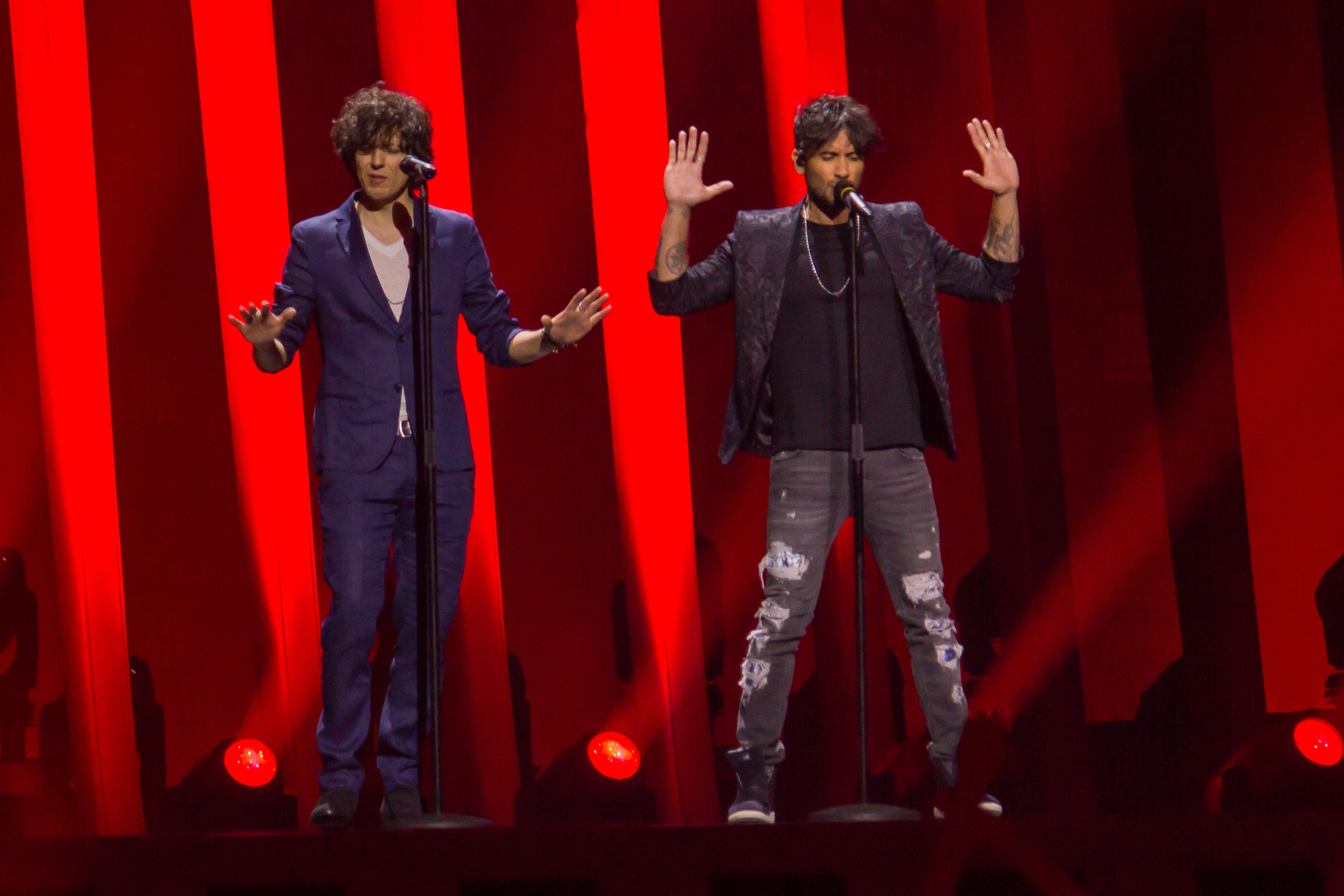
Ermal Meta and Fabrizio Moro in Lisbon (2018)

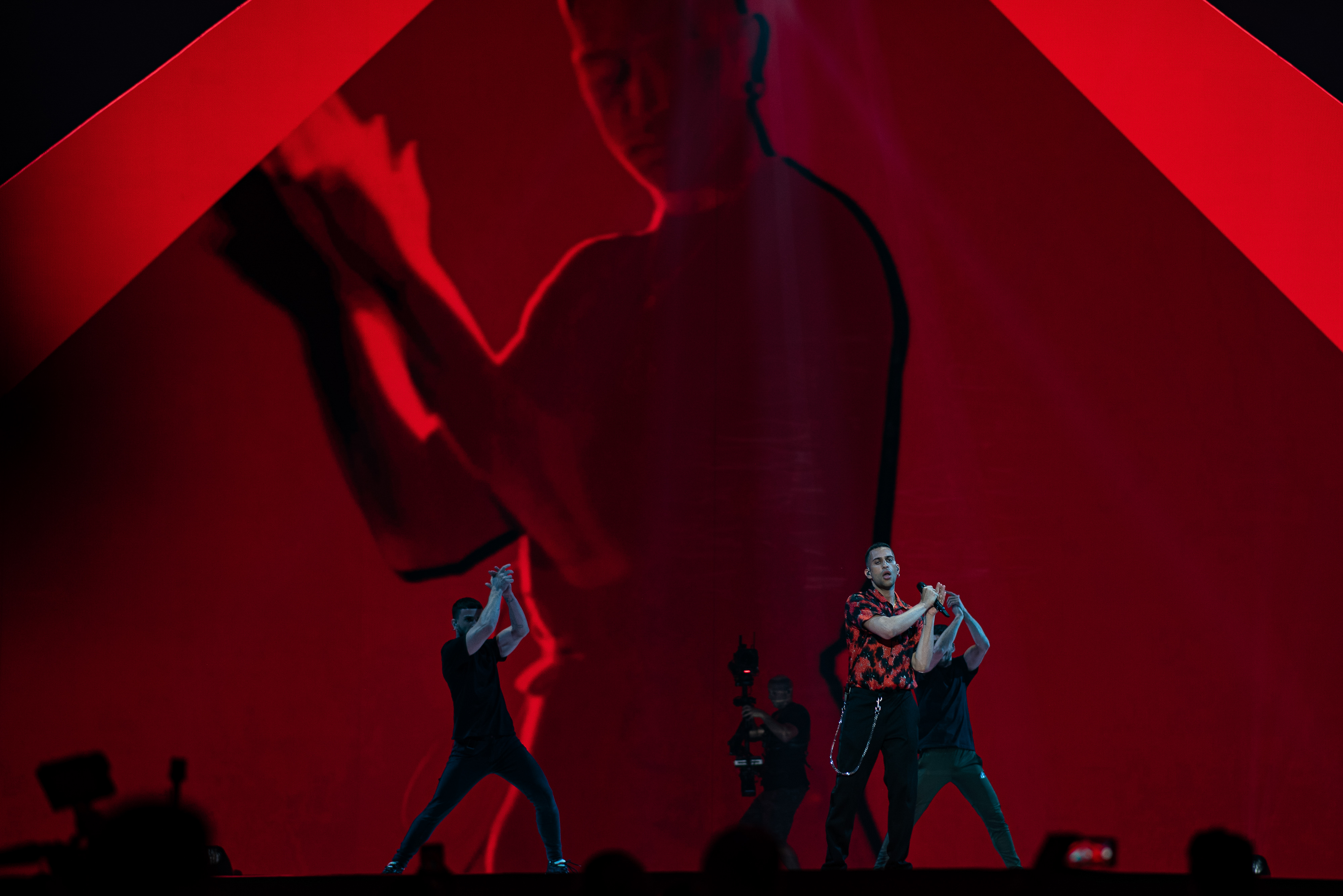
Mahmood in Tel Aviv (2019)

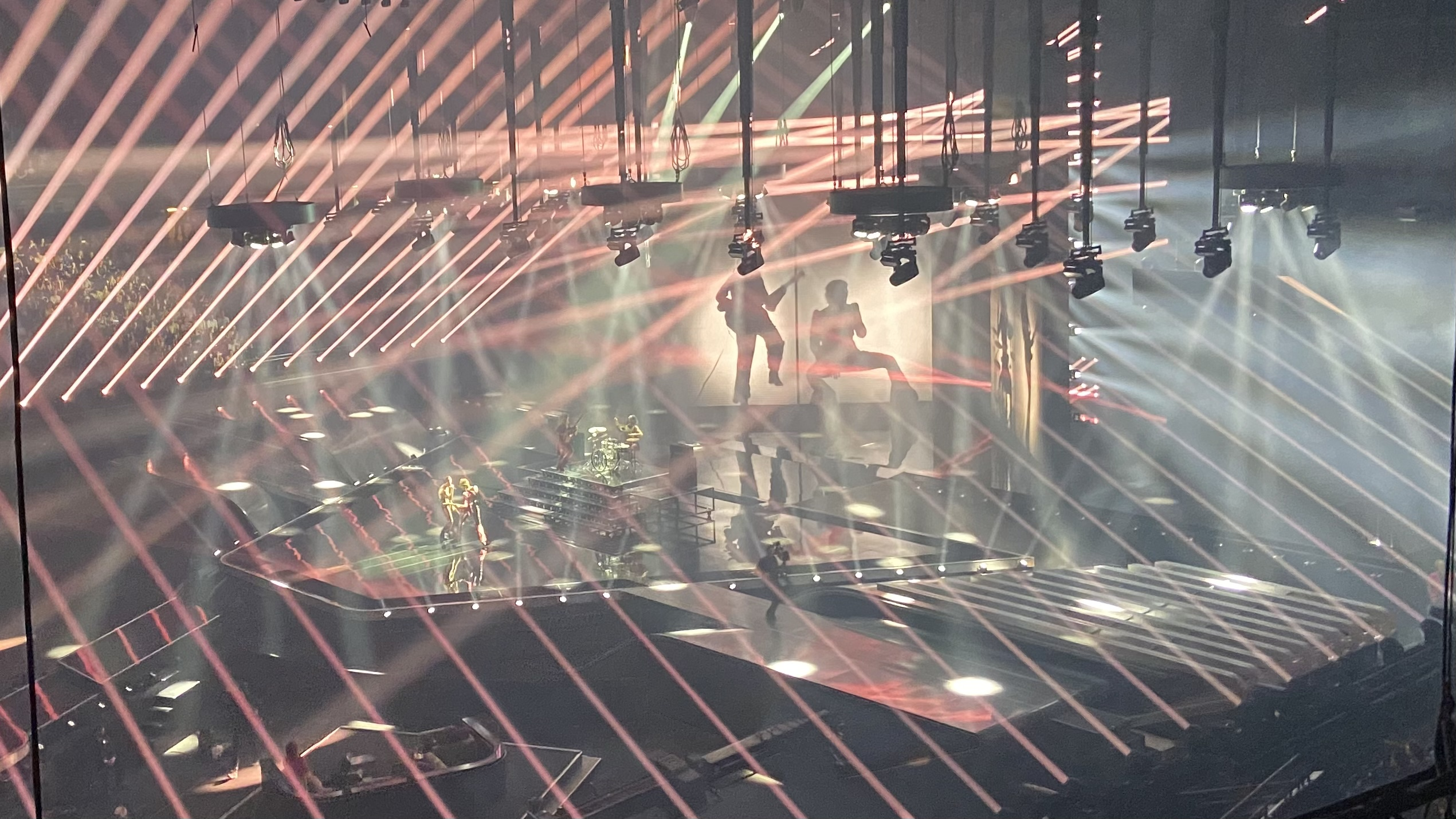
Måneskin in Rotterdam (2021)

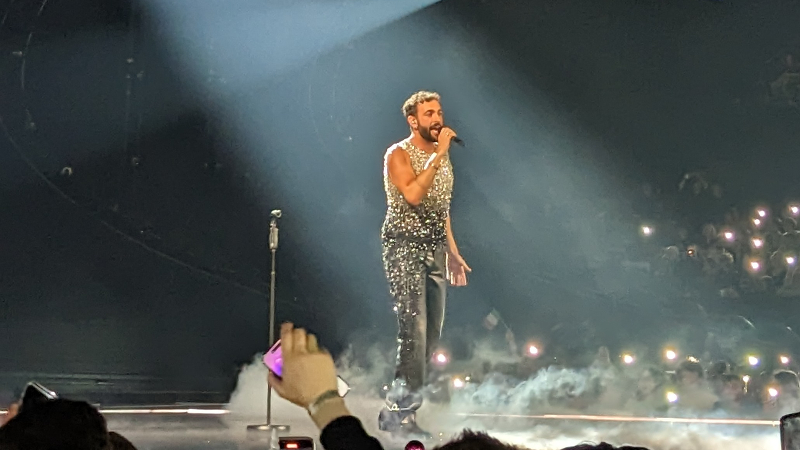
Marco Mengoni in Liverpool (2023)

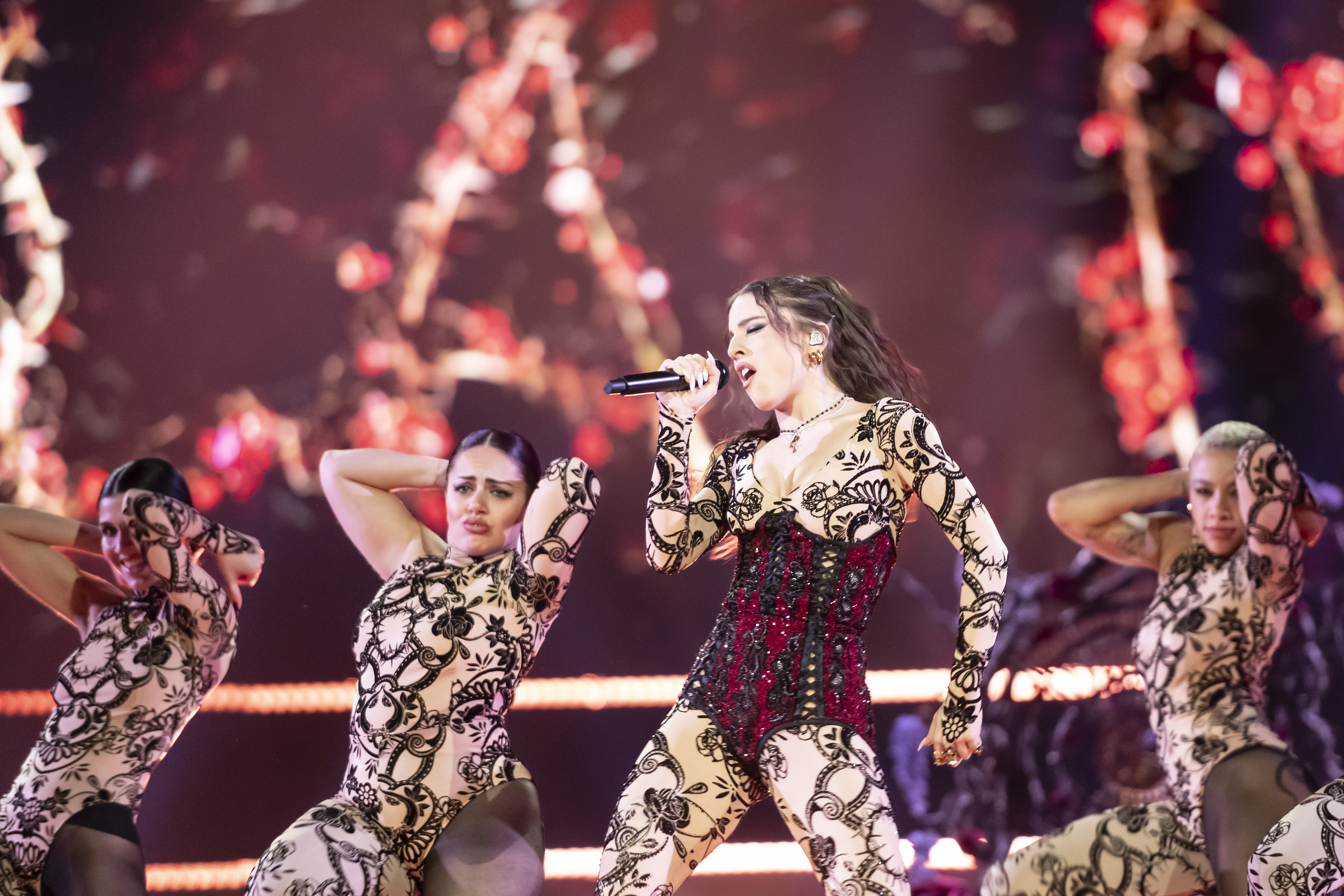
Angelina Mango in Malmö (2024)

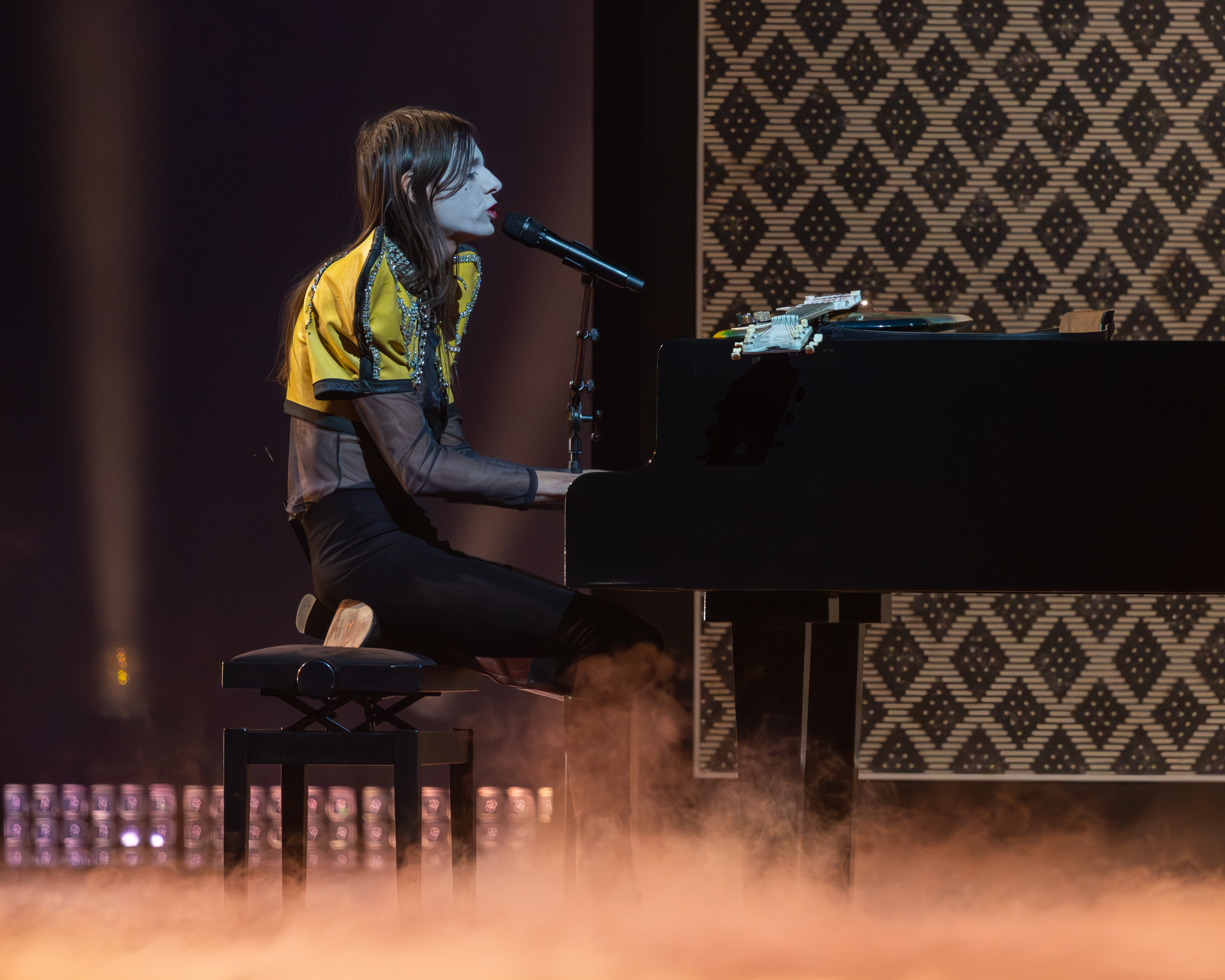
Lucio Corsi in Basel (2025)

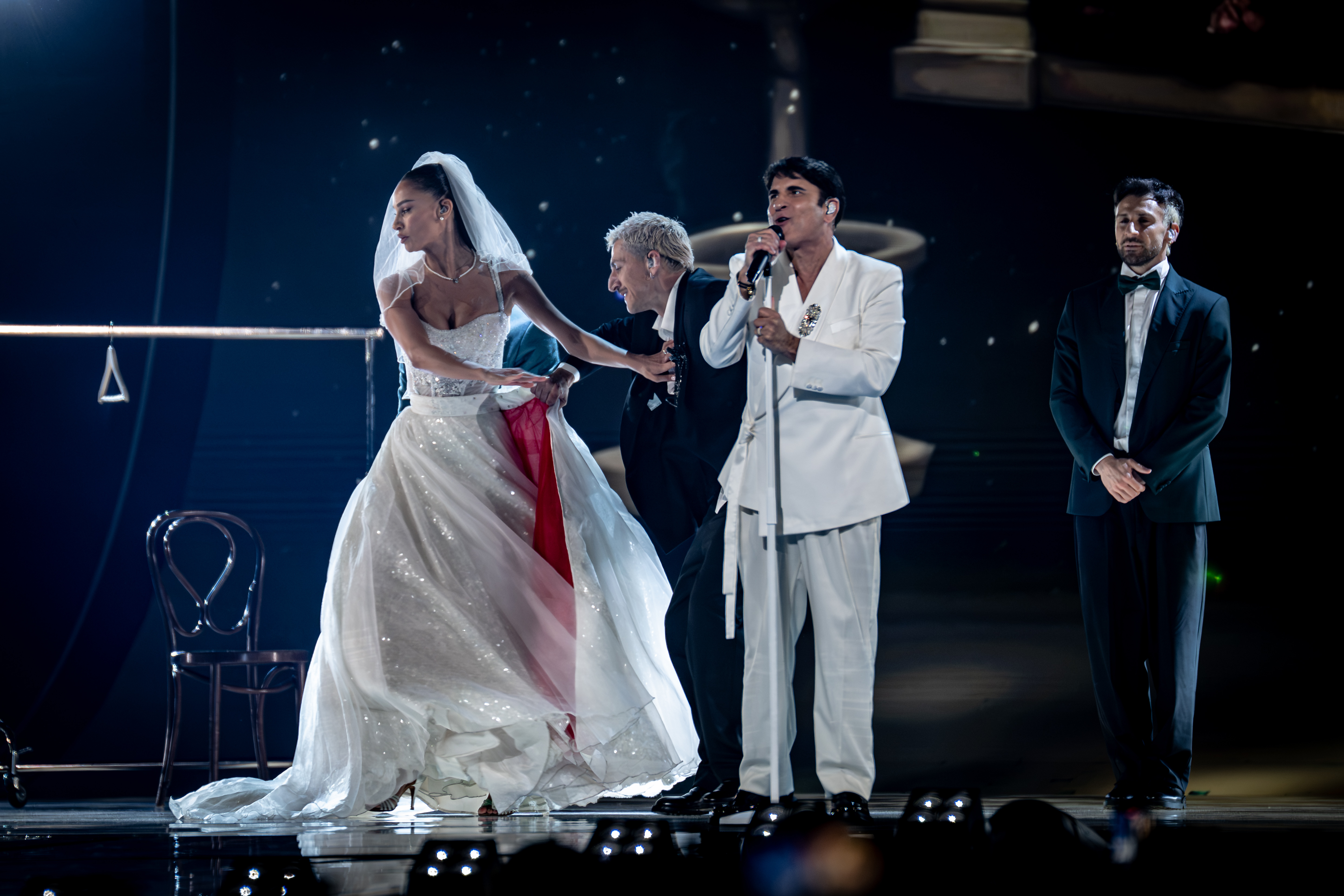
Sal Da Vinci in Vienna (2026)

== See also ==
- Italy in the Junior Eurovision Song Contest – Junior version of the Eurovision Song Contest.
