= Murderer in the Fog =

1964 film directed by Eugen York

- Directed by: Eugen York
- Written by: Walter Forster; Per Schwenzen
- Produced by: Benno Kaminski; Waldemar Schweitzer
- Starring: Hansjörg Felmy; Ingmar Zeisberg; Elke Arendt
- Cinematography: Günter Haase
- Edited by: Walter Fredersdorf
- Music by: Herbert Jarczyk
- Production company: Klaus Überall Produktion
- Distributed by: Nora-Filmverleih
- Release date: 22 May 1964
- Running time: 88 minutes
- Country: West Germany
- Language: German

Murderer in the Fog (German: Nebelmörder) is a 1964 West German crime film directed by Eugen York and starring Hansjörg Felmy, Ingmar Zeisberg and Elke Arendt.

The film's sets were designed by the art director Karl Schneider. The film was partly shot on location in Baden-Württemberg.

== Plot ==
The police investigate a series of murders in a small German town.

== Cast ==
- Hansjörg Felmy as Kommissar Hauser
- Ingmar Zeisberg as Hilde Kment
- Elke Arendt as Franziska Hillebrand
- Ralph Persson as Heinz Auer
- Wolfgang Völz as Kriminalassistent Kurt Freitag
- Wolfgang Büttner as Schuldirektor Dr. Hillebrand
- Alfred Balthoff as Herr Lindemann
- Karl-Georg Saebisch as Herr Auer
- Berta Drews as Frau Ritzel
- Marlene Warrlich as Ulla Reiter
- Hilde Sessak as Frau Schmittner
- Isabelle Carlson as Gerda Brinkmann
- Elfriede Rückert as Frau Ambacher
- Addi Adametz as Krankenschwester
- Lutz Hochstraate as Erwin Lindemann
- Jürgen Janza as Franz Ritzel (as Hans Jürgen Janza)
- Wolfgang Jansen as Robert Elsen
- Rolf Stahl as Willi Wolfsberger
- Werner Schulenberg as Bert Steiner
- Günter Meisner as Kriminalassistent Behrend
- Benno Hoffmann as Komarek
- Herbert Knippenberg as Kriminalassistent Neuhaus
- Horst-Werner Loos as Kriminalassistent Betzinger
- Hannes Tannert as Herr Elsen
- Nikolaus Schilling as Ludwig Leitner
- Ursula van der Wielen as Barbara Freitag

== Bibliography ==
- Bock, Hans-Michael & Bergfelder, Tim. The Concise CineGraph. Encyclopedia of German Cinema. Berghahn Books, 2009.
