= Ingmar Zeisberg =

German actress (1933–2022)

- Born: 17 February 1933; Free City of Danzig
- Died: 12 October 2022 (aged 89)
- Occupation: Actress
- Years active: 1954-present

Ingmar Zeisberg (17 February 1933 – 12 October 2022) was a German actress. She appeared in more than thirty films since 1954.

Ziesberg died on 12 October 2022, at the age of 89.

== Selected filmography ==
Year	Title	Role	Notes
1954	The Confession of Ina Kahr	Marianne	
1955	André and Ursula	Nora	
1957	Aunt Wanda from Uganda	Lilli von Zeller	
1959	Peter Voss, Hero of the Day	Dolly	
1961	Black Gravel	Inge Gaines	
1963	The Strangler of Blackmoor Castle	Judy	
1964	The Inn on Dartmoor	Evelyn Webster	
1964	Murderer in the Fog	Hilde Kment	
1964	Flug in Gefahr	Janet	TV film
1970	Wie ein Blitz	Diana Stewart	TV miniseries
1972	Havoc	Sibylle	
1976	Hans im Glück	Eva Bothe	TV film
