= Black Gravel =

1961 film directed by Helmut Käutner

- Wolfgang Büttner, Anita Höfer, Heinrich Trimbur in Black Gravel
- German: Schwarzer Kies
- Directed by: Helmut Käutner
- Screenplay by: Helmut Käutner; Walter Ulbrich
- Produced by: Walter Ulbrich
- Starring: Helmut Wildt; Ingmar Zeisberg
- Cinematography: Heinz Pehlke
- Edited by: Klaus Dudenhöfer
- Music by: Bernhard Eichhorn
- Production company: UFA
- Distributed by: UFA
- Release date: 16 April 1961 (West Germany)
- Running time: 111 minutes
- Country: West Germany
- Language: German

Black Gravel (German: Schwarzer Kies) is a 1961 West German drama film directed by Helmut Käutner and starring Ingmar Zeisberg and Anita Höfer. The screenplay was written by Käutner and Walter Ulbrich.

== Plot ==
For years following World War II Germans struggled with shortages of everything - housing, water, food, clothing. An American Air Force base is being expanded in the village of Sohnen, where its spending and that of several thousand American soldiers drives the local economy. The natives have clearly mixed feelings about the intrusion into their life, land, and culture presented by the military and its personnel, and both the black market and prostitution flourish.

Truck owner Robert Neidhardt is part of a ring diverting black gravel from base road construction to a private profiteer. In a chance encounter he is reunited with a former girlfriend who ran out on him some years earlier, and from which he had never recovered. She is married to an American major, trying to put her tawdry past behind her, trading her soul for security. No matter how hard she resists, Robert is determined to draw her back to him.

An investigation into gravel theft leads to a police raid. Inge seeks to warn him, and ends up in his truck with him when he accidentally kills a couple on a midnight romantic tryst. He sends Inge away, then buries the bodies beneath his gravel load along a runway ramp under construction. Their "disappearance" stems a second inquest, which overlaps the first. As authorities close in from both directions Robert grows ever more ruthless, reckless, and violent. Inge confesses the truth to her husband, who is determined to keep the matter silent, as US intelligence has concluded the couple were spies who defected to East Germany. Inge realizes she is trapped any way she turns, but her deep and passionate feelings for Robert overwhelm her.

When Robert learns the authorities are no longer searching for the missing couple he relaxes, realizing that - with the key figure who could implicate him in the gravel theft keeping silent - he no longer is wanted for either investigation. Then Inge arrives and tells him of her confession to her husband, and pleas to flee with him out of the country. He refuses her, saying that he had not only been seeking to protect himself but her marriage and stable future she had so prized. She says she doesn't care anymore, she only wants to be with him.

As she clings to the driver's door of his truck he speeds off. She is thrown off and dies in a fall to the pavement. He gathers her body and takes her to the same runway ramp, lays her out, and the truck's load begins to cover her body with gravel. Unable to take what has befallen them both, he throws himself atop Inge and is covered with the crushed stone.

== Cast ==
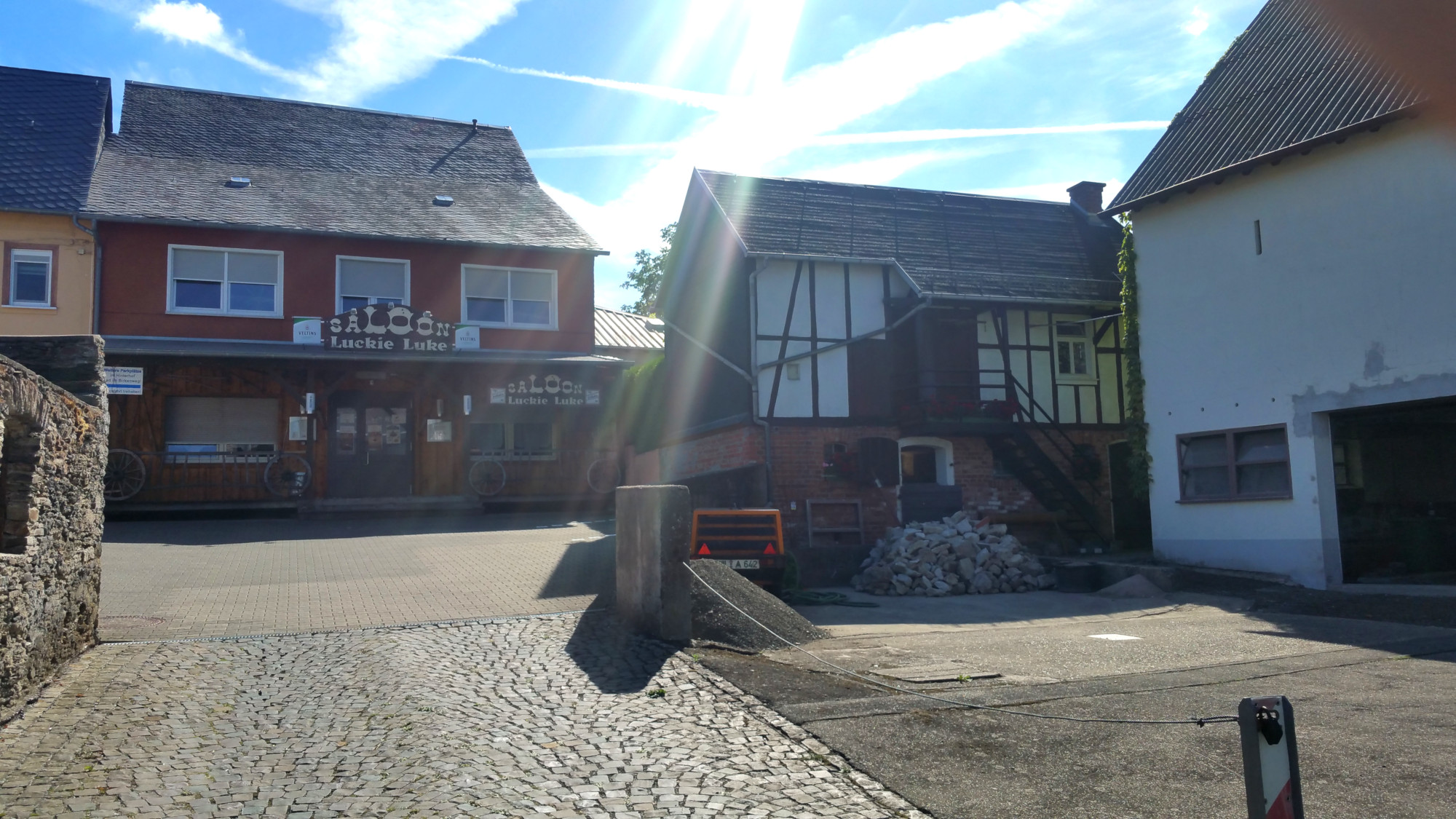
The filming location for the bar-brothel "Bar Atlantic" in 2018

- Helmut Wildt as Robert Neidhardt
- Ingmar Zeisberg as Inge Gaines
- Hans Cossy as John Gaines
- Wolfgang Büttner as Otto Krahne
- Anita Höfer as Elli
- Gisela Fischer as Margot
- Ilse Pagé as Karla
- Heinrich Trimbur as Eric Moeller
- Peter Nestler as Bill Rodgers
- Edeltraud Elsner as Anni Peel
- Else Knott as Frau Marbach
- Guy Gehrke as Wiechers, Jr.
- Karl Luley as "der alte" Rössler
- Max Buchsbaum as Loeb

== Production ==
The film was shot in Lautzenhausen, Germany. Its sets were designed by the art director. Location shooting took place at Hahn Air Base, and interiors filmed at the Tempelhof Studios in Berlin.

== Reception ==
=== Charges of antisemitism ===
Käutner attempted to show postwar Germany as it was, gritty, smarting from defeat, internally conflicted, and still encumbered by antisemitism in spite of severe denazification efforts. In an angry exchange highlighting that Germany had still not been demilitarized, an intoxicated old man insists on playing martial music on the jukebox of the bar-brothel where he is a menial, and rudely refuses to stop.

A contemporary Der Spiegel article, "Slice of Life" ("Eine Scheibe Leben"), describes the scene.

The camera travels through the smoky haze of a tavern, at the tables, US soldiers and fräuleins are hanging out. Playing from the jukebox for several minutes is marching music and a farmer, his walking stick slung over his shoulder like a weapon, marches in place in front of the record player, enjoying the fond memories. Finally, the tavern owner admonishes him, "Okay, time for another record... The Yanks are already complaining." The farmer: "The Yanks can kiss my..." The tavern owner bends over and pulls the plug out of the wall. The music stops. The old man curses, "Dirty Jew!"

— Scene from Black Gravel described in Der Spiegel, 26 April 1961

The camera tracks the owner's sleeve as he reaches for the plug, revealing to the audience for a second time he had been a Nazi concentration camp prisoner. He made no reaction to the reflexive taunt.

The farmer's outburst caused the Central Council of Jews in Germany to protest the film and file a criminal complaint, charging the invective violated the national law against antisemitism. Though the director and producer said the Council misunderstood their intent, and the general secretary of the Council said he found the movie "much more anti-German than anti-Jewish," all the scenes with Jewish references were cut from the negative of the film as exhibited.

Not until 2009 was the film as originally premiered shown again, after an uncut version was uncovered in an archive and the excised scenes restored to the original theatrical print.

== See also ==
- The Golden Plague (1954)
