= Tante Wanda aus Uganda =

1957 film

- Theatrical film poster
- Directed by: Géza von Cziffra
- Written by: Ernst Neubach
- Produced by: Ernst Neubach
- Starring: Grethe Weiser; Georg Thomalla; Lucie Englisch; Ingmar Zeisberg
- Cinematography: Ernst W. Kalinke
- Edited by: Martha Dübber
- Music by: Ralph Maria Siegel
- Production company: Neubach Film
- Distributed by: Prisma Film
- Release date: 7 June 1957
- Running time: 82 minutes
- Country: West Germany
- Language: German

Tante Wanda aus Uganda ("Aunt Wanda from Uganda") is a 1957 West German comedy film directed by Géza von Cziffra and starring Grethe Weiser, Georg Thomalla and Lucie Englisch. The screenplay concerns a strong-willed woman who returns from Uganda and puts the lives of her family in order.

== Cast ==
- Grethe Weiser as Wanda Ramirez
- Georg Thomalla as Jonas Edelmuth
- Lucie Englisch as Rosa von Zeller
- Ingmar Zeisberg as Lilli von Zeller
- Rudolf Platte as Karl von Zeller
- Eveline Bey
- Al Hoosmann as Tarzan
- Hans Jürgen Diedrich as Postman Müller
- Franz-Otto Krüger as Detective
- Bruno W. Pantel as Kampfveranstalter

== Bibliography ==
- Fenner, Angelica (2011). Race Under Reconstruction in German Cinema: Robert Stemmle's Toxi. German and European Studies. Toronto: University of Toronto Press. doi:10.3138/9781442670174. ISBN 978-1442640085. JSTOR 10.3138/9781442670174.
