= The Eddie Chapman Story =

1971 West German television film

- Written by: Stefan Gommermann
- Directed by: Wolfgang Becker
- Starring: Peter Vogel; Anita Höfer; Joseph Offenbach
- Country of origin: West Germany
- Original language: German

Production
- Producer: Ingeborg Janiczek
- Cinematography: Richard Schüler
- Editor: Ursula Mai
- Running time: 83 minutes
- Production company: ZDF

Original release
- Network: ZDF
- Release: 17 September 1971

The Eddie Chapman Story (German: Kein Geldschrank geht von selber auf - Die Eddie-Chapman-Story) is a 1971 West German television comedy thriller film directed by Wolfgang Becker and starring Peter Vogel, Anita Höfer and Joseph Offenbach. The film's sets were designed by the art director Hans-Ulrich Thormann. It was first broadcast on ZDF on 17 September 1971. It is inspired by the career of the English safecracker Eddie Chapman who in the Second World War was recruited as a spy by Nazi Germany, while working as a double agent for British intelligence.

== Cast ==
- Peter Vogel as Eddie Chapman
- Anita Höfer as Betty Chapman
- Joseph Offenbach as Freddy Hill
- Friedrich Joloff as Oberst von Grunen
- Charlie Rinn as Jackson
- Manfred Reddemann as Schneider
- Axel Klingenberg as Wolff
- Elma Karlowa as Liz
- Günter Lüdke as Andy
- Eva Gelb as Daisy
- Rainer Basedow as Fatty
- Günther Jerschke as Mr. J.
- Hanns Ernst Jäger as Gefängnisdirektor
- Charles Regnier as Superintendent
- Ulrich Matschoss as Inspektor
- Peter Kuiper as Obersturmbannführer
- Marga Maasberg as Alte Portugiesin
- Hans Paetsch as Botschraftsrat
- Franz-Otto Krüger as Rechtsanwalt
- Wolfram Schaerf as Britischer Major

== See also ==
- Triple Cross, a 1966 British film based on the same subject

== Bibliography ==
- Bock, Hans-Michael & Bergfelder, Tim. The Concise CineGraph. Encyclopedia of German Cinema. Berghahn Books, 2009.
- Klünder, Achim. Encyclopedia of television plays in German speaking Europe: Volume 1. De Gruyter, 2011.
