= Friedrich Joloff =

German actor

- Born: 14 December 1908; Berlin, German Empire
- Died: 4 January 1988 (aged 79); Verden an der Aller, West Germany
- Other name: Friedrich Jolowicz
- Occupation: Actor
- Years active: 1950-1976 (film & TV)

Friedrich Joloff (1908–1988) was a German film and television actor, active in the postwar era. He also worked as a voice actor, dubbing films for release in the German-speaking markets. He has been described as a "suave character actor". The half-Jewish Joloff had fled Nazi Germany in 1935 and settled in Italy. After military service during the Second World War he was taken prisoner by the British in 1943 and sent to Canada. He returned to German after the end of the war. Joloff appeared as a homosexual in the 1957 film Different from You and Me directed by Veit Harlan, one of several gay actors to be cast in the production.

== Selected filmography ==
- Melody of Fate (1950)
- Desperate Moment (1953)
- Orient Express (1953, TV series)
- Teenage Wolfpack (1956)
- Die Stimme der Sehnsucht (1956)
- Different from You and Me (1957)
- Lilli (1958)
- Liebe kann wie Gift sein (1958)
- Man on a String (1960)
- The Door with Seven Locks (1962)
- Jack and Jenny (1963)
- Tim Frazer (1963, TV miniseries)
- The Inn on Dartmoor (1964)
- Die Schlüssel (1965, TV miniseries)
- Raumpatrouille (1966, TV series)
- Johnny Banco (1967)
- Babeck (1968, TV miniseries)
- Hotel Royal (1969, TV film)
- Moonlighting Mistress (1970)
- 11 Uhr 20 (1970, TV miniseries)
- The Eddie Chapman Story (1971, TV film)
- Father Brown (1972, TV series)
- The Vengeance of Doctor Mabuse (1972)
- Malombra (1974, TV miniseries)

== Bibliography ==
- Baer, Hester. Dismantling the Dream Factory: Gender, German Cinema, and the Postwar Quest for a New Film Language. Berghahn Books, 2012.
- Noack, Frank. Veit Harlan: The Life and Work of a Nazi Filmmaker. University Press of Kentucky, 2016.
