= Anita Höfer =

German actress

- Born: February 27, 1944 (age 82); Stuttgart, Germany
- Occupation: Actress
- Years active: 1961- (film and TV)

Anita Höfer (born 1944) is a German film and television actress. She has also worked as a voice actress, dubbing foreign films for release in the German market.

== Selected filmography ==
- Via Mala (1961)
- Black Gravel (1961)
- Murder Party (1961)
- The Bird Seller (1962)
- Doctor Sibelius (1962)
- Only a Woman (1962)
- Situation Hopeless... But Not Serious (1965)
- Congress of Love (1966)
- Einer fehlt beim Kurkonzert (1968, TV film)
- The Eddie Chapman Story (1971, TV film)
- Angry Harvest (1985)

== Bibliography ==
- Peter Cowie & Derek Elley. World Filmography: 1967. Fairleigh Dickinson University Press, 1977.
