= Sanremo Music Festival 1956 =

Italian song contest (6th edition)

Dates and venue
- Semi-final 1: 8 March 1956
- Semi-final 2: 9 March 1956
- Final: 10 March 1956
- Venue: Sanremo Casino; Sanremo, Italy

Organisation
- Broadcaster: Radiotelevisione italiana (RAI)
- Musical director: Gian Stellari
- Artistic director: Giulio Razzi
- Presenters: Fausto Tommei, Maria Teresa Ruta

Vote
- Number of entries: 20
- Winner: "Aprite le finestre" Franca Raimondi

The Sanremo Music Festival 1956 (Italian: Festival di Sanremo 1956), officially the 6th Italian Song Festival (6º Festival della canzone italiana), was the sixth annual Sanremo Music Festival, held at the Sanremo Casino in Sanremo between 8 and 10 March 1956. It was organised by Radiotelevisione italiana (RAI) in cooperation with the Sanremo Casino, and broadcast by RAI. The show was presented by actor Fausto Tommei, assisted by television announcer Maria Teresa Ruta.

The winner of the festival was "Aprite le finestre", written by Virgilio Panzuti and Pinchi, and performed by Franca Raimondi; with "Amami se vuoi", written by Mario Panzeri and Vittorio Mascheroni, and performed by Tonina Torrielli, placing second; and "La vita è un paradiso di bugie", written by Nino Oliviero and Diego Calcagno, and performed by Luciana Gonzales, placing third.

The festival also inspired the international Eurovision Song Contest, which held its inaugural edition this year. The two first placed songs of this edition went on to represent Italy in the contest.

== Competing entries ==
Songs could be submitted to broadcaster RAI until 31 December 1955. Each music publisher could only submit one song while several songs per composer were allowed. 405 songs were submitted, twenty of them were selected by a professional jury to compete at the festival, with Orio Vergani acting as jury president. The jury included poets, writers and musicians like Angelo Barile, Guglielmo Petroni, Attilio Bertolucci, Raffaele Gervasio, Armando Renzi, Angelo Francesco Lavagnino, Fulvio Palmieri and Mario Consiglio.

Competing entries
Song	Composer	Lyricist	Publishing firm
"Albero caduto"	Mario Ruccione	Giuseppe Fiorelli	Ruccione
"Amami se vuoi"	Mario Panzeri; Vittorio Mascheroni		Mascheroni
"Anima gemella"	Carlo Alberto Rossi	Gian Carlo Testoni	C. A. Rossi
"Aprite le finestre"	Virgilio Panzuti	Pinchi	Cielo
"Due teste sul cuscino"	Furio Rendine	Gian Carlo Testoni	E.A.R.
"È bello"	Dante Vignali	Danpa	Roram
"Ho detto al sole"	Franco Falco	Riccardo Morbelli	Desmax
"Il bosco innamorato"	Gorni Kramer	Gian Carlo Testoni	Kramer
"Il cantico del cielo"	Carlo Alberto Rossi	Alberto Testa	Ariston
"Il trenino del destino"	Mario Schisa; Mario Trama	Bixio Cherubini	Trillo
"Il trenino di latta verde"	Marcello Gigante	Luigi Luciano Martelli; Ennio Neri	Accordo
"La colpa fu"	Eros Sciorilli	Gippi; Luciano Beretta	Fortissimo
"La vita è un paradiso di bugie"	Nino Oliviero	Diego Calcagno	Souvenir
"Lucia e Tobia"	Giovanni D'Anzi	Mario Panzeri	D'Anzi
"Lui e lei"	Mauro Casini	Silvana Simoni; Angelo Faccenna	R.P.D.
"Musetto"	Domenico Modugno		Curci
"Nota per nota"	Guido Viezzoli		Tiber
"Parole e musica"	Franco Silvestri	Nino Rastelli	Nazionale
"Qualcosa è rimasto"	Luigi Spaggiari	Pinchi	Mondia Music
"Sogni d'or"	Paolo Maschio	Armando Costanzo	Superba

== Selection of artists ==
According to the rules of this edition, all songs were performed by newcomer artists. The six artists were selected through the competition "Concorso nazionale per voci nuove", or short "Voci nuovi", among 6,446 participants. After several selection rounds, twelve finalists participated in radio finals held on 12, 13 and 14 January 1956. Four artists were presented on each night. The artists were presented to listeners without their name, just being assigned a number, and listeners voted by sending a postcard with the number corresponding to their favourite voice to RAI. Voting took place in three categories: "female rhythmic voices", "female melodic voices" and "male voices". For each category, the postcard voting lead to two singers chosen for Sanremo, making a total of six artists.

The winners in each category were:

- "Female melodic voices": Tonina Torrielli, Luciana Gonzales
- "Female rhythmic voices": Clara Vincenzi, Franca Raimondi
- "Male voices": Ugo Molinari, Gianni Marzocchi

== Contest overview ==
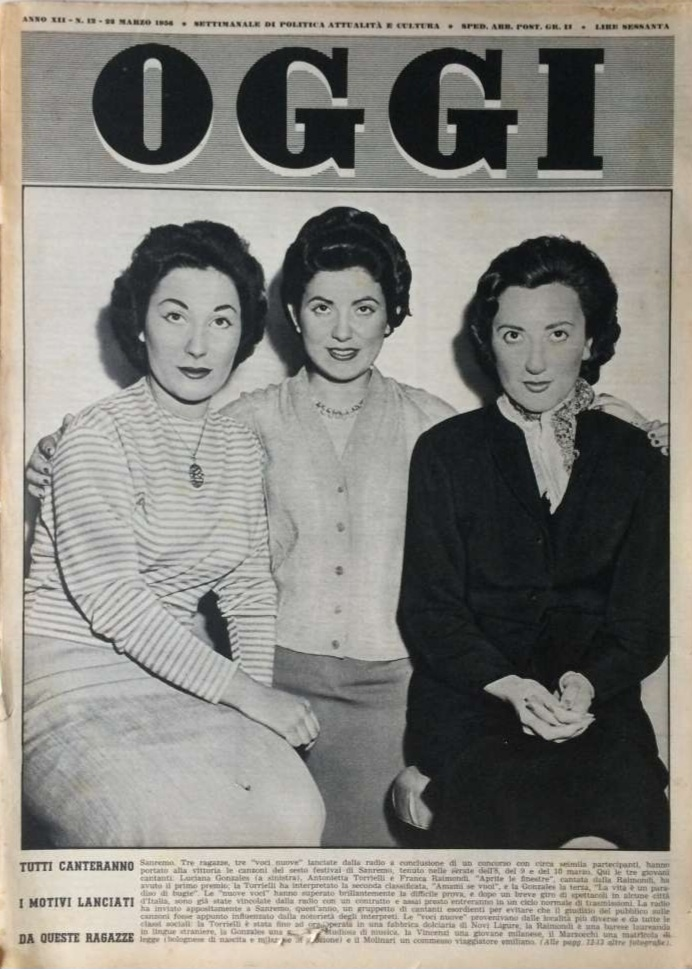
Left to right: Luciana Gonzales, Tonina Torrielli and Franca Raimondi on the cover of Oggi following the festival

This Sanremo Music Festival edition included twenty songs performed by six singers, spread over three consecutive evenings, in a format of two semi-finals and a final. The first two semi-final nights were held on 8 and 9 March, and the final on 10 March 1956. The festival was closed by an evening starring artists and songs from previous editions of the Sanremo Festival, held on 11 March 1956.

The shows were presented by Fausto Tommei and Maria Teresa Ruta. Giulio Razzi served as artistic director. The artists were accompanied by an orchestra under the musical direction of Gian Stellari. Each song was presented twice, once sung by one of the artists, and a second time in an instrumental version, this time played by the orchestra of George Melachrino. Before the voting started, a short recap of all songs was played on the piano by Alberto Semprini.

Ten songs competed in each semi-final. Five songs from each night advanced to compose again ten songs for the third and final night. The winning song was decided by 14 regional juries consisting each of 15 radio listeners, plus a jury of 70 jurors, chosen by draw from all 900 spectators in the audience in Sanremo.

=== Semi-final 1 ===
During the first semi-final, a man was arrested for throwing pamphlets, in which he criticised the selection process.

Qualifier

Semifinal 1 – 8 March 1956
R/O	Song	Artist	Points	Place
1	"Lui e lei"	Clara Vincenzi	142	6
2	"Nota per nota"	Ugo Molinari	279	4
3	"Il trenino del destino"	Franca Raimondi	101	8
4	"La vita è un paradiso di bugie"	Luciana Gonzales	295	1
5	"Sogni d'or"	Franca Raimondi	89	9
6	"Albero caduto"	Ugo Molinari	281	2
7	"Qualcosa è rimasto"	Tonina Torrielli	110	7
8	"Musetto"	Gianni Marzocchi	170	5
9	"Parole e musica"	Luciana Gonzales	23	10
10	"Il cantico del cielo"	Tonina Torrielli	280	3

=== Semi-final 2 ===
Qualifier

Semifinal 2 – 9 March 1956
R/O	Song	Artist	Points	Place
1	"Anima gemella"	Clara Vincenzi & Gianni Marzocchi	132	6
2	"Aprite le finestre"	Franca Raimondi	308	1
3	"Ho detto al sole"	Gianni Marzocchi	56	9
4	"Il trenino di latta verde"	Clara Vincenzi	55	10
5	"Due teste sul cuscino"	Ugo Molinari	294	2
6	"Amami se vuoi"	Tonina Torrielli	265	4
7	"Lucia e Tobia"	Franca Raimondi & Gianni Marzocchi	98	8
8	"Il bosco innamorato"	Tonina Torrielli	178	5
9	"La colpa fu"	Ugo Molinari, with Luciana Gonzales, Franca Raimondi, Tonina Torrielli, Clara Vincenzi	266	3
10	"È bello"	Luciana Gonzales	114	7

=== Final ===
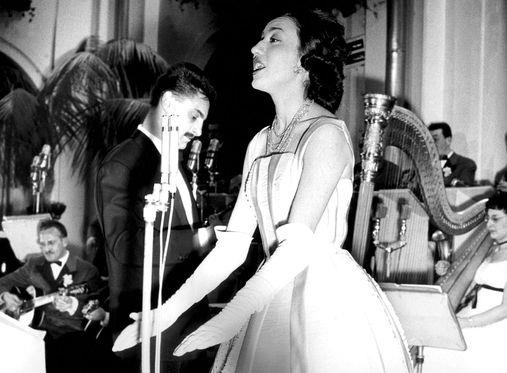
Franca Raimondi performing the winning song

According to press reports, the ticket prices for the final were criticised by spectators, composers and singers alike, reaching 16,200 lire. In order to prevent the auditorium from being half-empty, reduced tickets were sold shortly before the final started.

For the voting of the final, 35 spectators from the auditorium were chosen who each distributed two points among their favourite songs, whereas the members of the 14 regional radio juries distributed four points.

The winner was "Aprite le finestre", written by Virgilio Panzuti and Pinchi, and performed by Franca Raimondi; with "Amami se vuoi", written by Mario Panzeri and Vittorio Mascheroni, and performed by Tonina Torrielli, placing second; and "La vita è un paradiso di bugie", written by Nino Oliviero and Diego Calcagno, and performed by Luciana Gonzales, placing third. Prizes were handed out to the first three places, and the three songs were performed again at the end of the show.

Winner

Final – 10 March 1956
R/O	Song	Artist	Points	Place
1	"Musetto"	Gianni Marzocchi	41	8
2	"Il bosco innamorato"	Tonina Torrielli	77	6
3	"La colpa fu"	Ugo Molinari, with Luciana Gonzales, Franca Raimondi, Tonina Torrielli, Clara Vincenzi	88	5
4	"Amami se vuoi"	Tonina Torrielli	163	2
5	"Nota per nota"	Ugo Molinari	24	9
6	"Il cantico del cielo"	Tonina Torrielli	92	4
7	"Albero caduto"	Ugo Molinari	76	7
8	"La vita è un paradiso di bugie"	Luciana Gonzales	153	3
9	"Due teste sul cuscino"	Ugo Molinari	20	10
10	"Aprite le finestre"	Franca Raimondi	171	1

After the festival, Nino Oliviero, composer of the third-placed song "La vita è un paradiso di bugie", was taken to court by Mimmo Surace and accused of plagiarism from the song "Ninna nanna al cuore" by Surace. The accusation finally was dismissed by the judge.

== Detailed voting results ==
Detailed voting results of the first semi-final
R/O	Song	Palermo	Bari	Naples	Rome	Cagliari	Florence	Ancona	Trieste	Venice	Bolzano	Bologna	Milan	Turin	Genoa	Sanremo	Total
1	"Lui e lei"	16	4	8	12	4	8	8		16		4	12		24	26	142
2	"Nota per nota"	8	36	12	12	24	16	24	20	20	28	12	28	20	5	15	279
3	"Il trenino del destino"	16	8	4	16	16	12			4		4		4	8	9	101
4	"La vita è un paradiso di bugio"	24	16	32	32	16	16	16	8	16	24	48	5	16	12	15	295
5	"Sogni d'or"		12	8	4	12	8	8	4	4	4	8	4	4	4	5	89
6	"Albero caduto"	40	16	24	12	16	32	16	40	8	8	28	4	16	16	5	281
7	"Qualcosa è rimasto"		12	8	8	4		4	4	8	12	4	12	12	8	14	110
8	"Musetto"	4	16	8	4	24	8	8	12	16	8	4	28	8	8	14	170
9	"Parola e musica"				4		4	4	4	4						3	23
10	"Il cantico del cielo"	12		12	12	4	16	24	28	24	28	8	24	36	32	20	280

Detailed voting results of the second semi-final
R/O	Song	Palermo	Bari	Naples	Rome	Cagliari	Florence	Ancona	Trieste	Venice	Bolzano	Bologna	Milan	Turin	Genoa	Sanremo	Total
1	"Anima gemella"	12	4	8	16	8	8	12	8	8	24	4	4	12		4	132
2	"Aprite le finestre"	12	32	16	16	24	28	28	20	20	20	8	28	28	8	20	308
3	"Ho detto al sole"		8	8	4	4	4		4			12	4		4	4	56
4	"Il trenino di latta verde"	8				12	4		4		4			8	4	11	55
5	"Due teste sul cuscino"	16	24	24	20	12	24	12	16	24	16	32	20	12	36	6	294
6	"Amami se vuoi"	12	4	32	8	12	8	24	28	12	20	12	28	8	28	29	265
7	"Lucia e Tobia"	8	8	4	4	8	8		8	4	8	4	12	4	4	14	98
8	"Il bosco innamorato"	24	20	12	16	8	16	4	8	8	8	24		12	8	10	178
9	"La colpa fu"	12	16	8	12	16	16	24	16	40	12	20	16	24	24	10	266
10	"È bello"	12	4	8	20	8	4	12	8	4	4	4	4	4	4	14	114

Detailed voting results of the final
R/O	Song	Milan	Turin	Trieste	Bolzano	Venice	Bologna	Genoa	Florence	Ancona	Rome	Naples	Bari	Palermo	Cagliari	Sanremo	Total
1	"Musetto"	4	8	4		4				4		4	4		8	1	41
2	"Il bosco innamorato"	4	8			4				16	12	4	24		4	1	77
3	"La colpa fu"		8	12	12	16	4		8		12	4			8	4	88
4	"Amami se vuoi"	12	8	12	40	4	8	4	8	8	4	12		32		11	163
5	"Nota per nota"						8	12							4		24
6	"Il cantico del cielo"	12	8	12		24		16	4		12	4					92
7	"Albero caduto"		4	4	4				20	4	4		8	12	8	8	76
8	"La vita è un paradiso di bugie"	4	4	8	4	4	16	12	8		4	12	24	12	8	33	153
9	"Due teste sul cuscino"	8	4	4					4								20
10	"Aprite le finestre"	24	8	4		4	24	8	8	28	8	20		4	20	11	171

== Broadcasts ==
=== Local broadcast ===
All shows were broadcast on RAI Televisione and Secondo Programma, beginning at 22:00 CET (21:00 UTC), with a deferred broadcast on television starting on 22:45 CET for semi-final 1, and 22:15 CET for the final.

=== International broadcast ===
The festival was broadcast in Austria, Belgium, France, Germany, the Netherlands, and Switzerland. Known details on the broadcasts in each country, including the specific broadcasting stations are shown in the tables below.

International broadcasters of the Sanremo Music Festival 1956
Country	Broadcaster	Channel(s)	Commentator(s)	Refs
Austria	ORF	ORF		
Belgium	NIR/INR	INR		
Belgium	NIR/INR	NIR		
France	RTF	RTF		
Germany	ARD	Deutsches Fernsehen		
Netherlands	NTS	NTS	Piet te Nuyl Jr.	
Switzerland	SRG SSR	SRG		
Switzerland	SRG SSR	TSR	Georges Hardy	

== At Eurovision ==
The two first places of this Sanremo Music Festival edition, "Aprite le finestre" sung by Franca Raimondi, and "Amami se vuoi" sung by Tonina Torrielli, went on to perform at the international Eurovision Song Contest 1956 on 24 May 1956.

There were seven participating countries, and each performed two songs in the same order via two rounds, with Italy performing last in each round, following Luxembourg. "Aprite le finestre" was performed seventh, and "Amami se vuoi" fourteenth as the last song of the evening. An international jury composed of two jurors from each participating country decided the winner: The two Italian jurors were the conductors Tito Petralia and Cinico Angelini.

Only the winner – one of Switzerland's songs – was announced, after the private counting of the votes by the juries, and so the scores and placings of the two Italian songs are unknown. The two songs were succeeded as Italian representative at the 1957 contest by Nunzio Gallo with "Corde della mia chitarra".

The Eurovision Song Contest was broadcast on Italian Television, starting at 21:15 CET, and radio station Secondo Programma. On the same evening, Italy's first radio station Programma Nazionale broadcast excerpts from the Sanremo Music Festival at 21:45 CET.
