= Franca Raimondi =

Italian singer (1932–1988)

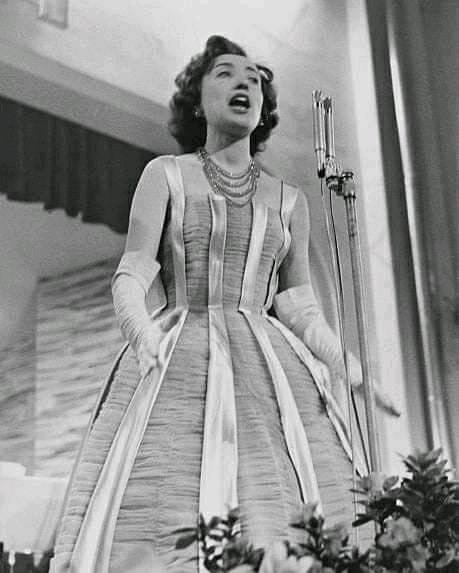
- Raimondi at the Sanremo Music Festival 1956

Background information
- Born: 8 July 1932; Monopoli, Bari, Kingdom of Italy
- Died: 28 August 1988 (aged 56) Monopoli, Bari, Italy
- Genres: Traditional pop
- Occupation: Singer
- Years active: 1955–1988

Franca Raimondi (8 July 1932 – 28 August 1988) was an Italian singer. She is best known for representing Italy in the Eurovision Song Contest 1956 with the song "Aprite le finestre".

== Biography ==
Born in Monopoli, Province of Bari, Apulia, Raimondi studied operatic singing and foreign languages. In 1955, Raimondi was among the winners of a RAI contest of new voices and got the chance to perform at the 1956 edition of the Sanremo Music Festival, which she eventually won with the song "Aprite le finestre". That same year she represented Italy in the first Eurovision Song Contest with the same song, alongside Tonina Torrielli with "Amami se vuoi".

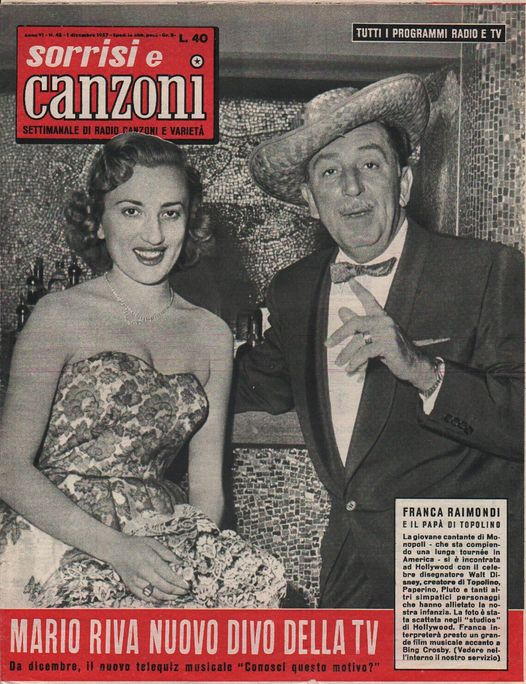
Franca Raimondi with Walt Disney in Hollywood during her tour in North America (November 1957); pictured on the cover of TV Sorrisi e Canzoni

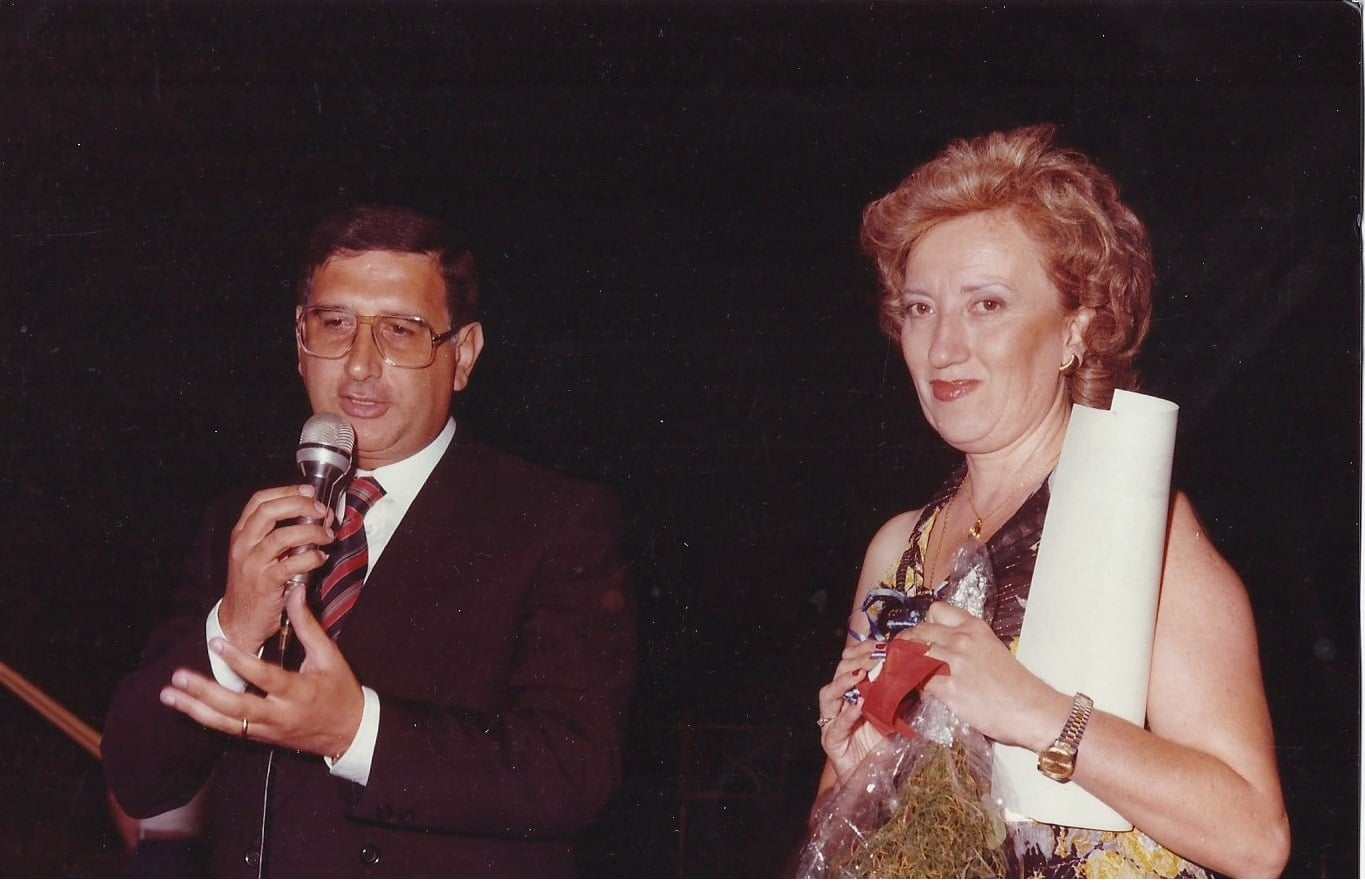
Raimondi awarded by the mayor of Monopoli in 1983

Between 1956 and 1958 Raimondi was leading vocalist in the Gian Stellari Orchestra. In 1960 she entered the competition at the Festival di Napoli with "Canzone all'antica" ("Old-style song"). In the later years she slowed her activities, focusing her career on live performances. She died from cancer on 28 August 1988, at the age of 56.

== See also ==
- Eurovision Song Contest 1956
- Italy in the Eurovision Song Contest

Preceded by N/A	Italy in the Eurovision Song Contest; 1956 (with Tonina Torrielli)	Succeeded by Nunzio Gallo with "Corde della mia chitarra"
