= Malombra (TV series) =

- Genre: Drama
- Country of origin: Italy
- Original language: Italian
- No. of series: 1
- No. of episodes: 4

Original release
- Network: Programma Nazionale
- Release: April 21 – May 12, 1974

Malombra is a 1974 Italian television series. It is an adaptation of the 1881 gothic novel Malombra by Antonio Fogazzaro, which has also been made into several films. It aired on Rai 1 in four 60 minutes episodes.

== Cast ==
- Giovanni Conforti as Giuseppe
- Marina Malfatti as Marina di Malombra
- Giulio Bosetti as Corrado Silla
- Friedrich Joloff as Andreas G. Steinegge
- Leda Palma as Fanny
- Emilio Cigoli as Conte Cesare d'Ormengo
- Ezio Busso as Il dottore
- Dorit Henke as Edith Steinegge
- Fausto Tommei as Professor Vezza
- Luciano Virgilio as Nepomuceno Salvador
- Miranda Campa as Giovanna
- Elsa Vazzoler as Contessa Fosca Salvador
- Marina Bonfigli as Contessa Giulia di Bella
- Toni Barpi as Momolo
- Emanuel Agostinelli as Rico
- Winni Riva as Catte
- Marcello Mandò as Ingegner Ferrieri
- Mario Lombardini as Don Innocenzo
- Giovanni Moretti as Il vetturale
- Enrico Osterman as Avvocato Mirovic
- Gino Nelinti as L'editore
- Ferruccio Casacci as Il tappezziere
- Corrado Gaipa as Padre Tosi
- Mauro Barbagli as Onorevole Finotti
- Franco Vaccaro as Il capostazione

== Bibliography ==
- Enrico Lancia. Dizionario del cinema italiano: testi e strumenti per la scuola e l'università, Volume 1. Gremese Editore, 2003.
