= Tonina Torrielli =

Italian singer (born 1934)

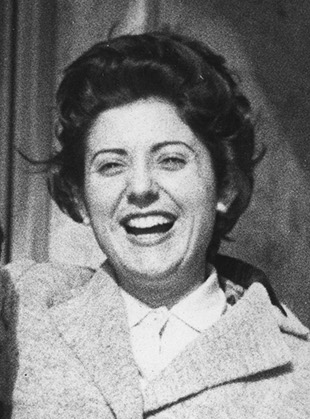
- Torrielli in the late 1950s

Background information
- Born: Antonietta Torrielli; 22 March 1934 (age 92); Serravalle Scrivia, Piedmont, Kingdom of Italy
- Genres: Traditional pop
- Occupation: Singer
- Years active: 1955–1965
- Labels: Cetra Records; Fonit Cetra
- Spouse: Mario Maschio (m. 1960; died 2013)

Antonietta "Tonina" Torrielli (born 22 March 1934) is an Italian singer. She is best known for representing Italy in the Eurovision Song Contest 1956 with the song "Amami se vuoi".

== Career ==
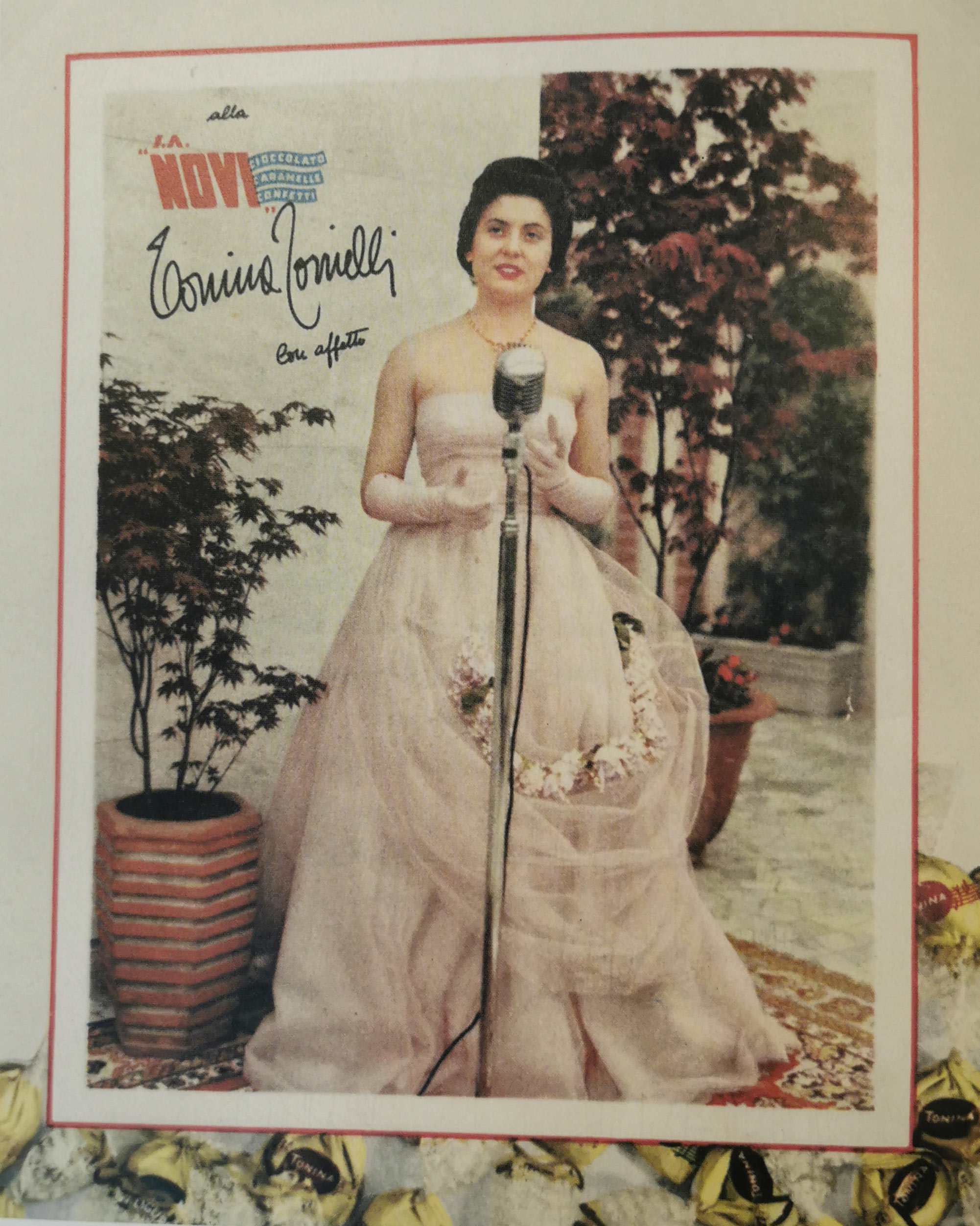
Torrielli in an autograph card dedicated to her former employer

A worker at a candy factory in Novi Ligure (after which she would later be dubbed La Caramellaia di Novi Ligure, "The Confectioner from Novi Ligure"), she participated in a RAI contest for new voices in 1955, being selected to compete at the Sanremo Music Festival 1956. Her performance of the song "Amami se vuoi" earned her the second place, behind Franca Raimondi with "Aprite le finestre". Both singers were selected to represent Italy at the upcoming first edition of the Eurovision Song Contest; it is unknown what position the songs finished, since the vote was secret and only the winning song was announced.

During her brief career, she took part in the Sanremo Music Festival a total of eight times, namely in 1956, 1957, 1958, 1959, 1960, 1961, 1962 and 1963; she also participated in Il Musichiere, Canzonissima and Cantagiro, before retiring in 1965 amid the decline of the traditional pop genre.

== Personal life ==
In 1960, Torrielli married Mario Maschio (1931–2013), who was the drummer in Cinico Angelini's orchestra. Shortly after, they opened a music shop in Piazza Castello in Turin, which was closed in 2003.

== Selected discography ==
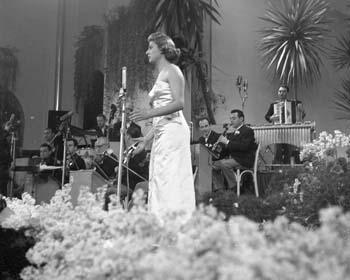
Torrielli performing at Sanremo 1958

=== Albums ===
- I successi (1956)
- Tonina Torrielli (1957)
- Le canzoni d'oro (1961)
- Tonina Torrielli (1967)

=== Selected songs ===
- "Amami se vuoi" (1956)
- "L'amore" (1958)
- "L'edera" (1958)

Preceded by N/A	Italy in the Eurovision Song Contest; 1956 (with Franca Raimondi)	Succeeded by Nunzio Gallo with "Corde della mia chitarra"
