= Aprite le finestre =

1956 song by Franca Raimondi

Single by Franca Raimondi
- Language: Italian
- Released: 1956
- Composer: Virgilio Panzuti
- Lyricist: Pino Perotti

Eurovision Song Contest 1956 entry
- Country: Italy
- Artist: Franca Raimondi
- Language: Italian
- Composer: Virgilio Panzuti
- Lyricist: Pino Perotti
- Conductor: Gian Stellari

Finals performance
- Final result: 2nd
- Final points: -

Entry chronology
- "Amami se vuoi" (1956) ►

"Aprite le finestre" ("Open the windows") is an Italian song by Franca Raimondi. It was composed by Virgilio Panzuti, with lyrics by Gian Stellari. It won the sixth edition of the Sanremo Music Festival and subsequently represented Italy in the first edition of the Eurovision Song Contest. It was the first-ever entry from Italy, and the first-ever entry in Italian, performed in the Eurovision Song Contest.

== Background ==
=== Conception ===
The song was composed by Virgilio Panzuti, with lyrics by Gian Stellari. It is in the Tuscan stornelli style, with Franca Raimondi singing about the joy of Spring (described as "a festival of love") beginning and her desire to open the windows to let the new season in.

=== Sanremo ===
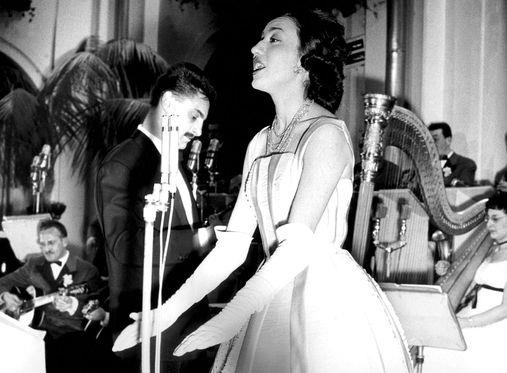
Raimondi performing "Aprite le finestre" at Sanremo.

On 9 March 1956, Raimondi performed "Aprite le finestre" for the first time, during the second night of the sixth edition of the Sanremo Music Festival, placing first and advancing to the final. On 10 March 1956, she performed the song again in the final, placing first again and winning the festival.

Radiotelevisione italiana (RAI) used that Sanremo to select its songs and performers for the first edition of the Eurovision Song Contest, and as the contest rules allowed two entries per country, the two best placed entries in Sanremo became the entries for Eurovision: winner "Aprite le finestre" by Franca Raimondi and runner-up "Amami se vuoi" by Tonina Torrielli.

=== Eurovision ===
On 24 May 1956, the first Eurovision Song Contest was held at Teatro Kursaal in Lugano hosted by Radio svizzera italiana (RSI) on behalf of the Swiss Broadcasting Corporation (SRG SSR), and broadcast live throughout the continent. Raimondi performed "Aprite le finestre" seventh on the evening, following Luxembourg's "Ne crois pas" by Michèle Arnaud and preceding the Netherlands' "Voorgoed voorbij" by Corry Brokken. Gian Stellari conducted the live orchestra in the performance of the Italian entries. Points and final placings at this contest have never been revealed, meaning that the only statement which can be made about the song's final position was that it did not win.

The songs were succeeded as Italian representative at the 1957 contest by "Corde della mia chitarra" performed by Nunzio Gallo.

== Charts ==
Chart	Peak position
Italy (Hit Parade)	1

== Legacy ==
Artists who recorded cover versions of the song include Nilla Pizzi, Quartetto Cetra, Achille Togliani, Fiorella Bini, and Lina Lancia. A Finnish version with the title "Kesällä kerran" was recorded by Olavi Virta.
