= Fausto Tommei =

Italian actor, voice actor and presenter

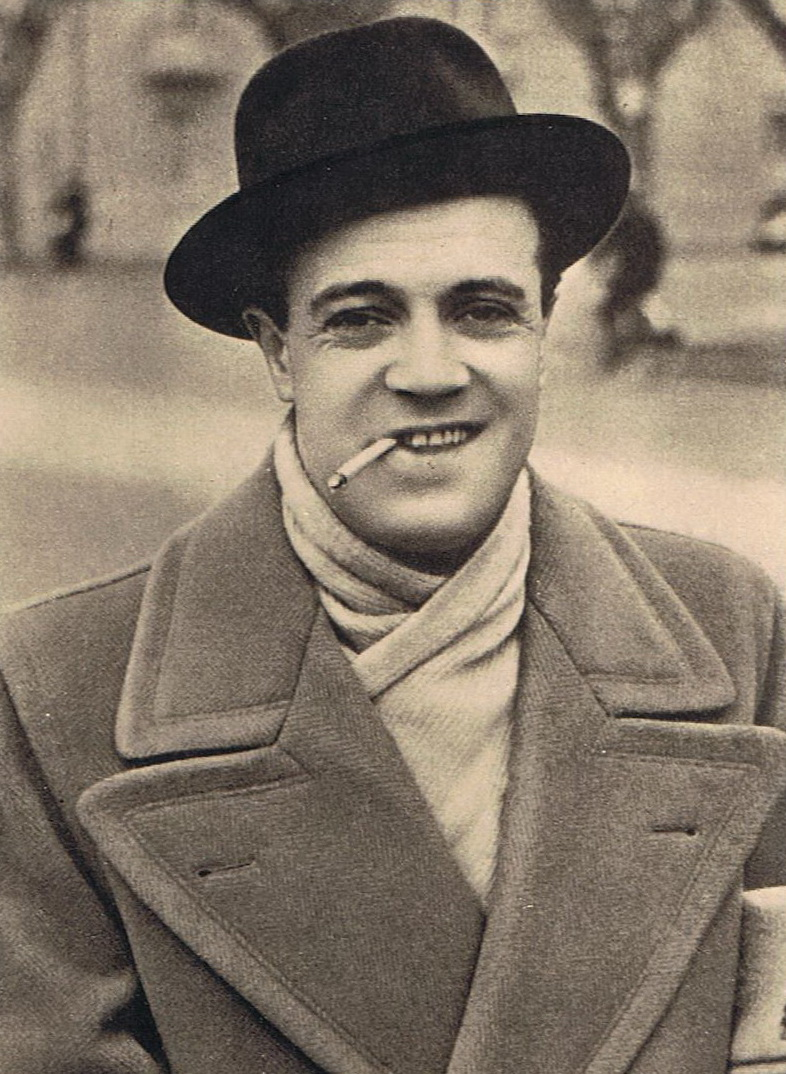
- Born: 29 July 1909; Venice, Italy
- Died: 23 July 1978 (aged 68); Rome, Italy
- Occupation: Actor

Fausto Tommei (29 July 1909 – 23 July 1978) was an Italian actor, voice actor and presenter.

== Life and career ==
Born in Venice, Tommei began his stage career immediately after graduating in Law. He became first known as a radio personality, working as an actor, comedian and presenter for EIAR and for some local radio stations in Milan.

In 1940 Tommei started appearing in films, usually cast in character roles. In 1941 he got critical acclaim for his performance on stage in Poeta fantastico, directed by Orazio Costa. After the war he focused his activities on revues, returning to dramatic roles in the mid-1950s. In 1956 he presented the Sanremo Music Festival. Between 1956 and 1958 he directed the Teatro delle Maschere in Milan. He was also active as a dubber.

A deeply religious man, Tommei was a Franciscan tertiary.

== Partial filmography ==
- Ecco la radio! (1940)
- Tentazione (1942) - Josef, il portiere della casa Wendich
- Cercasi bionda bella presenza (1942) - Archimede, il ragioniere
- Silenzio, si gira! (1943) - Il truccatore
- Vivere ancora (1945)
- 07... Tassì (1945)
- The Force of Destiny (1950) - Il marchese di Calatrava
- Siamo tutti milanesi (1953)
- Decameron nº 3 - Le più belle donne del Boccaccio (1972) - Nicostrato (segment "The Magic Pear Tree")
- Canterbury proibito (1972) - Husband of Agata (segment "Brache di San Grifone")
- Hospitals: The White Mafia (1973) - Patient on stretcher
- I giochi proibiti dell'Aretino Pietro (1973) - Husband of Eugenia (segment "The Trick")
- Provaci anche tu Lionel (1973)
- Malombra (1974) - Professor Vezza
- Killer Cop (1975) - Regazzoni
- La principessa sul pisello (1976) - Father of Maurice
- L'educatore autorizzato (1980) - Il maestro (final film role)
