= Switzerland in the Eurovision Song Contest 1957 =

- Eurovision Song Contest 1957
- Participating broadcaster: Swiss Broadcasting Corporation (SRG SSR)
- Country: Switzerland
- Selection process: Internationaler Schlagerwettbewerb 1957
- Selection date: 11 February 1957

Competing entry
- Song: "L'Enfant que j'étais"
- Artist: Lys Assia
- Songwriters: Géo Voumard; Émile Gardaz

Placement
- Final result: 8th, 5 votes

Participation chronology

Switzerland was represented at the Eurovision Song Contest 1957 with the song "L'enfant que j'étais", composed by Géo Voumard, with lyrics by Émile Gardaz, and performed by Lys Assia. The Swiss participating broadcaster, the Swiss Broadcasting Corporation (SRG SSR), selected its entry through a national final. Assia had already represented Switzerland at the previous contest performing both Swiss entries, and winning with "Refrain".

== Before Eurovision ==
=== Internationaler Schlagerwettbewerb 1957 ===
The Swiss Broadcasting Corporation (SRG SSR) held a national final to select its entry for the Eurovision Song Contest 1957. Songwriters who applied for the selection were required to have Swiss citizenship or to have been residing in Switzerland for at least ten years and could submit up to three songs. SRG SSR opened a submission window in autumn 1956, with the deadline on 5 January 1957. The broadcaster received 109 songs (69 in German, 22 in French, and 18 in Italian) from 75 songwriters.

The internal jury in Bern were tasked with choosing at most twenty songs and ultimately selected eleven songs to compete in the selection.

The national final, entitled Internationaler Schlagerwettbewerb 1957, was held on 11 February 1957 at 21:00 CET (20:00 UTC) at the Embassysaal in Badrutt's Palace Hotel, St. Moritz. It was broadcast on German- and French-speaking Swiss Television as well as on the radio stations Beromünster, Sottens, and Monte Ceneri. The director was Franco Marazzi. The program was presented by Heidi Abel in German and French, and by Giuseppe Albertini in Italian. The artists were accompanied by RSI's orchestra Radiosa under the musical direction of Fernando Paggi. The eleven entries were performed by Lys Assia, Jo Roland and Gianni Ferraresi, with Lys Assia performing five songs, Jo Roland three, and Gianni Ferraresi also three songs. Three entries were sung in German, four in French, and four in Italian. The running order was decided by a draw. The overall sound and image quality of the broadcast was so low that three songs had to be repeated upon the request of the jury of St. Moritz. Los Paraguayos performed as the interval act.

Four regional juries, located in Basel (representing radio Beromünster), Geneva (for radio Sottens), Lugano (for radio Monte Ceneri), and St. Moritz (representing Swiss Television), decided the winner. Each jury consisted of ten members, with each jury member giving one vote to their favourite song. The jury members from St. Mortiz were present within the location of the final, while the remaining juries delivered their votes in their respective cities. The ten jurors from Geneva consisted of Marius Berthet (jury president), Jean-Pierre Allenbach, Robert Burnier, Raymond Colbert, Jo Excoffier, Frank Guibat, Lisette Martin, Robert Pibouleau, Clairette Sacchi, and Julien-François Zbinden. In the Luganese jury, Bruno Pagnamenta was the jury president. The juries gave their votes via telephone.

Following the voting, three songs tied for first place with 8 votes each: "La Vie" and "Avec vingt sous", sung by Jo Roland, and "L'Enfant que j'étais", performed by Lys Assia. After all three songs had been performed once more, a revote of the tying entries took place to decide the winner. The winner was the song "L'Enfant que j'étais", composed by Géo Voumard, with lyrics by Émile Gardaz, arranged by Mario Robbiani, and performed by Lys Assia. The songwriters Gardaz and Voumard had already won both the national final and the Eurovision Song Contest for Switzerland in 1956, in both occasions also with Lys Assia as the singer.

Internationaler Schlagerwettbewerb – 11 February 1957
R/O	Artist	Song	Language	Songwriter(s)		Votes	Place
R/O	Artist	Song	Language	Composer	Lyricist	Votes	Place
1	Jo Roland	"La Vie"	French	Pierre Gisin		8	1
2	Lys Assia	"L'Enfant que j'étais"	French	Géo Voumard	Émile Gardaz	8	1
3	Gianni Ferraresi	"Lasciami tranquillo"	Italian	Renato Ranzanici		0	9
4	Lys Assia	"Derrière la cathedrale"	French	Achille Scotti	Dominique Roland	2	6
5	Gianni Ferraresi	"Nel mio carnet"	Italian	Giovanni Pelli	Mario Robbiani	0	9
6	Gianni Ferraresi	"Bellissima"	Italian	Giovanni Pelli	Mario Robbiani	7	4
7	Jo Roland	"Avec vingt sous"	French	Dominique Roland		8	1
8	Lys Assia	"Musst du schon geh'n?"	German	Tibor Kasics	Jürg Amstein	0	9
9	Jo Roland	"Quand je rêve"	French	Géo Voumard	Émile Gardaz	1	8
10	Lys Assia	"Ein trautes Lied vom Turm herab"	German	Franz Hutter		4	5
11	Lys Assia	"Ça n'empêchera pas"	French	Andrée Bühlmann		2	6

Internationaler Schlagerwettbewerb – Detailed jury voting results
R/O	Song	Basel	Geneva	Lugano	St. Moritz	Total
1	"La Vie"	4		2	2	8
2	"L'Enfant que j'étais"		4	1	3	8
3	"Lasciami tranquillo"					0
4	"Derrière la cathedrale"				2	2
5	"Nel mio carnet"					0
6	"Bellissima"			6	1	7
7	"Avec vingt sous"	3	4		1	8
8	"Musst du schon geh'n?"					0
9	"Quand je rêve"				1	1
10	"Ein trautes Lied vom Turm herab"	2	2			4
11	"Ça n'empêchera pas"	1		1		2

Internationaler Schlagerwettbewerb – Tiebreaker – 11 February 1957
Artist	Song	Jury votes					Place
Artist	Song	Basel	Geneva	Lugano	St. Moritz	Total	Place
Lys Assia	"L'Enfant que j'étais"		7	5	5	17	1
Jo Roland	"La Vie"	6		5	3	14	2
Jo Roland	"Avec vingt sous"	4	3		2	9	3

=== Releases and archives ===
"L'Enfant que j'étais" by Lys Assia was first recorded and released on a single under the same title in 1957. In 1998, the song was featured in a CD compilation titled "Concours Eurovision De La Chanson 1956-1998: Schweizer Beiträge", which compiled every Swiss Eurovision entry at the time.

Jo Roland released "La Vie" and by "Avec vingt sous" in his debut single, titled after the former song, in 1957. Gianni Ferraresi would release "Bellissima" two years later.

Studio recordings of all competing entries have been preserved in the Swiss National Sound Archives.

== At Eurovision ==
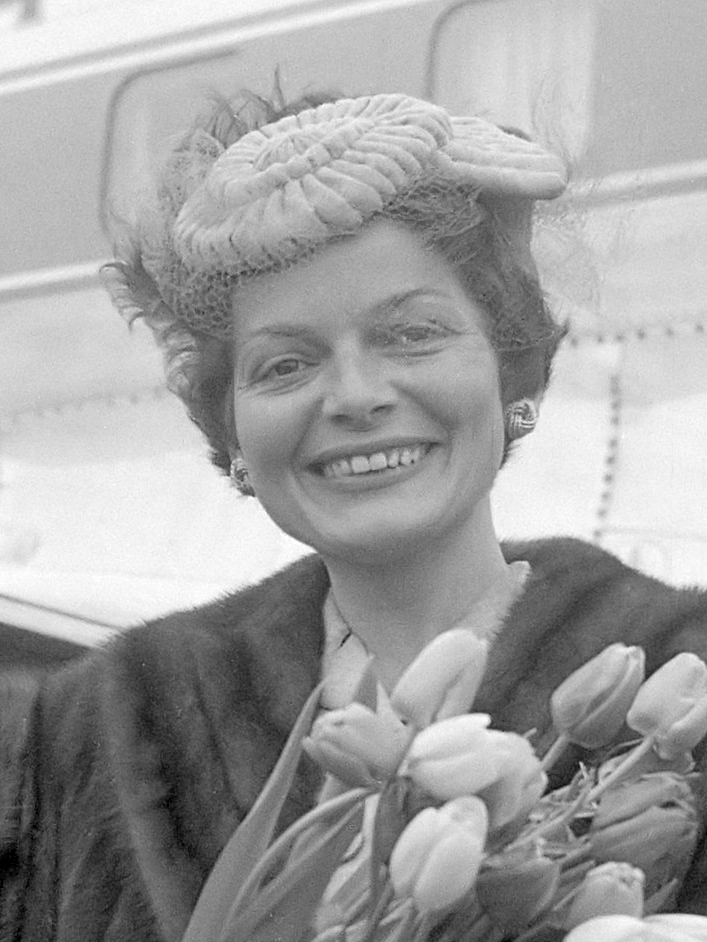
Lys Assia represented Switzerland in the Eurovision Song Contest 1957

At the Eurovision Song Contest 1957 in Frankfurt, the Swiss entry was performed tenth and last in the running order, following Denmark. The Swiss entry was conducted at the contest by the event's musical director Willy Berking. At the close of voting, Switzerland had received five votes in total; the country finished shared eight among the ten participants.

The contest was broadcast in Switzerland on French-speaking TSR with commentary by Robert Beauvais, on German-speaking television, as well as on radio Beromünster and Sottens. Excerpts were broadcast on 11 March 1957 at 20:00 CET on the second program of radio Monte Ceneri.

=== Voting ===
Each participating broadcaster assembled a ten-member jury panel. Every jury member could give one vote to their favourite song.

Votes awarded to Switzerland
Score	Country
2 votes	Denmark
1 vote	Germany; Italy; Luxembourg

Votes awarded by Switzerland
Score	Country
7 votes	Netherlands
2 votes	United Kingdom
1 vote	Belgium
