= Switzerland in the Eurovision Song Contest 1956 =

- Eurovision Song Contest 1956
- Participating broadcaster: Swiss Broadcasting Corporation (SRG SSR)
- Country: Switzerland
- Selection process: Grand Prix Européen de la Chanson: Finale suisse
- Selection date: 28 April 1956

Competing entries

First entry
- Song: "Das alte Karussell"
- Artist: Lys Assia
- Songwriter: Georg Betz-Stahl

Second entry
- Song: "Refrain"
- Artist: Lys Assia
- Songwriters: Géo Voumard; Émile Gardaz

Placement
- Final result: "Das alte Karussell": N/A "Refrain": 1st

Participation chronology

Switzerland was represented at the Eurovision Song Contest 1956 with two songs: "Das alte Karussell" written by Georg Betz-Stahl, and "Refrain" composed by Géo Voumard, with lyrics by Émile Gardaz. Both songs were performed by Lys Assia. The Swiss participating broadcaster, the Swiss Broadcasting Corporation (SRG SSR), selected its entries through a national final. In addition, Radio svizzera italiana (RSI), on behalf of SRG SSR, was the host broadcaster and staged the event at the Teatro Kursaal in Lugano. "Das alte Karussell" was the first-ever entry from Switzerland performed in the Eurovision Song Contest, and the first-ever entry in German in the contest; while "Refrain", that eventually won the contest, was the first-ever winner in its history.

== Before Eurovision ==
For their national selection, the Swiss Broadcasting Corporation (SRG SSR) opened a public submission period between January and 20 February 1956 for interested songwriters to submit their compositions. Only songwriters with Swiss citizenship or having been residing in Switzerland for at least ten years were allowed to participate. Only songs written in German, French or Italian were eligible. 402 songs were submitted, with half of them with German lyrics, a third in French and the rest in Italian. A jury assembled in Lugano chose eleven of them for the national final.

=== Grand Prix Européen de la Chanson: Finale suisse ===
The national final called Grand Prix Européen de la Chanson: Finale suisse was held at the Radio Lausanne Studio de la Sallaz in Lausanne on 28 April 1956 at 20:45 CET (19:45 UTC). It was broadcast on TSR and SRG as well as on the radio stations Beromünster, Sottens and Monte Ceneri. Fritz Schäufele commented the final for the German-speaking radio and television. The final was directed by Jean-Jacques Lagrange, and presented by Raymond Colbert. The studio audience consisted of invited guests and journalists.

Eleven songs were sung by Jo Roland, Anita Traversi and Lys Assia. They were accompanied by the Orchestra Radiosa under the direction of Fernando Paggi. Seven songs were sung in French, three in German, one in Italian. Four entries had been written by Radio Lausanne's own Émile Gardaz and Géo Voumard. The accordionist duo Les Frères Domergue and the harmonica group Trio Hill Billy's were interval acts. The puppet group Compagnie des marottes and André Robert seem to have also participated in the show.

A professional jury of nine members watched the songs from inside the studio, and then decided the winning songs in a secret vote, with three members each representing each of the languages German, French and Italian. One of the jury members was Father Kaelin.

The winners were the songs "Refrains", composed by Géo Voumard and written by Émile Gardaz, and, "Das alte Karussell", written and composed by Georg Betz-Stahl. Both songs were performed by Lys Assia.

National final – 28 April 1956
R/O	Artist	Song	Language	Songwriter(s)	
R/O	Artist	Song	Language	Composer	Lyricist
1	Jo Roland	"Vendredi"	French	Géo Voumard	Émile Gardaz
2	Lys Assia	"Sei doch nicht so eifersüchtig"	German	Ernst Lüthold	Fredy Schulz
3	Lys Assia	"Das alte Karussell"	German	Georg Betz-Stahl	
4	Jo Roland	"L'Allée aux ormeaux"	French	Géo Voumard	Émile Gardaz
5	Anita Traversi	"Bandella ticinese"	Italian	Guido Zanzi	Luciano Bonato
6	Jo Roland	"La Ballade des bonnes années"	French	Géo Voumard	Émile Gardaz
7	Lys Assia	"Le Bohémien"	French	Roger Pittet	Guy Loran
8	Jo Roland	"Les Deux Coquins"	French	René de Pascale	Gilby Caillet
9	Jo Roland	"J'ai triché"	French	Pierre Gisin	Jean Destoy
10	Lys Assia	"Addio Bella Napoli"	German	Georg Betz	
11	Lys Assia	"Refrains" (Note: Consistently spelled as "Refrains" in reports about the national final but as "Refrain" in the international Eurovision Song Contest in Lugano.)	French	Géo Voumard	Émile Gardaz

== At Eurovision ==
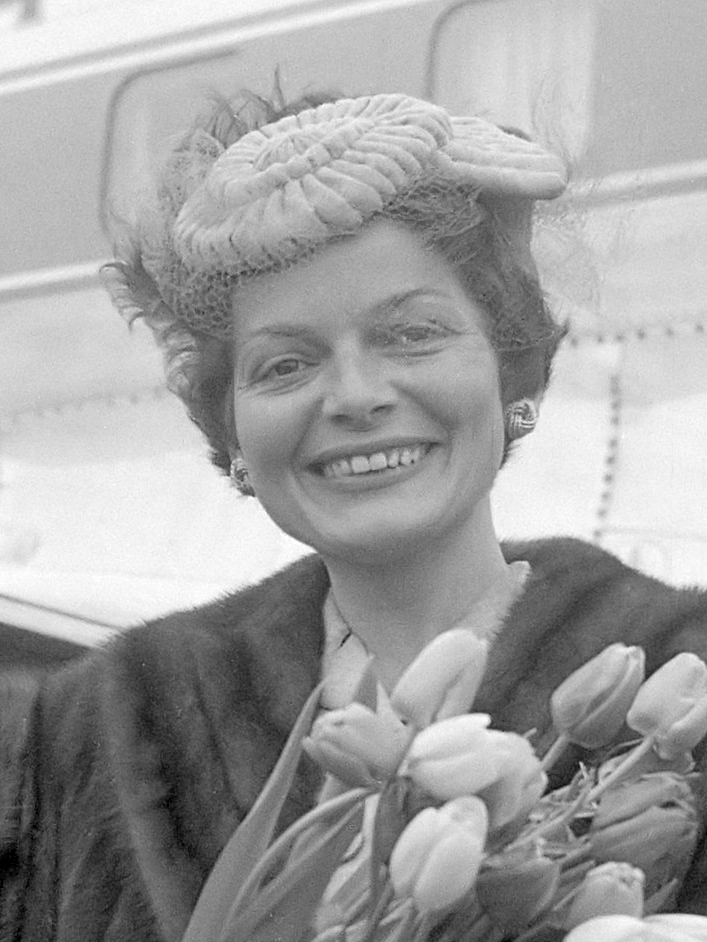
Lys Assia (pictured in 1957) won the Eurovision Song Contest 1956

"Das alte Karussell" was performed second and "Refrain" was performed ninth in the running order, both following the Netherlands and preceding Belgium's two entries. Both of the Swiss entries were conducted at the contest by the musical director Fernando Paggi. "Refrain" was arranged by Mario Robbiani. Lys Assia's competitor in the national final and Swiss representative of 1964, Anita Traversi was one of the background singers.

Each participating broadcaster appointed two jury members who voted by giving between one and ten points to each song, including those representing their own country. All jury members were colocated in a separate room in the venue in Lugano and followed the contest via a television set. The Swiss jury members were Father Pierre Kaelin and Rolf Liebermann who also acted as president of the jury.

After the jury had held its vote, "Refrain" was announced as the winner of the Eurovision Song Contest 1956. The placements of all other participating entries are not known.

The final in Lugano was broadcast in Switzerland on TSR (with commentary by Raymond Colbert) and SRG (with commentary by Fritz Schäufele) as well as on the radio stations Beromünster, Sottens and Monte Ceneri. Excerpts from the final were rebroadcast on Radio Monte Ceneri on 10 June 1956 at 21:45 CET.
