= Dany Dauberson =

French singer (1925–1979)

- Born: Suzanne Gauche; 16 January 1925; Le Creusot, France
- Died: 16 March 1979 (aged 54); Marseille, France
- Resting place: Saint-Claude, France
- Occupations: Singer, actress

Dany Dauberson (16 January 1925 – 16 March 1979) was a French singer and actress. In 1956, both Dauberson and Mathé Altéry individually represented France in the first Eurovision Song Contest.

== Early life ==
Dany Dauberson was born on 16 January 1925 in Le Creusot, Saône-et-Loire, France.

== Eurovision ==
On 24 May 1956, at the first Eurovision Song Contest, held at the Teatro Kursaal in Lugano, each participating country had two entrants due to the format of the competition's first year. Dauberson, one of the French entrants, performed the song "Il est là" ("He's Here") while Mathé Altéry, the other French entrant, sang "Le Temps Perdu" ("Lost Time"). Dauberson's score and placing remained undisclosed to this day as only the winner, Lys Assia, was announced, until October 2026 when it was discovered that she finished second place.

== Car crash ==
On 8 April 1967, Dauberson suffered major injuries while riding in a car driven by her girlfriend, actress Nicole Berger. The vehicle skidded off the road and crashed into a tree while heading towards Duranville, Eure, on the N13. Dauberson was thrown out of her seat and through the windscreen, while Berger suffered a fractured skull and a crushed rib cage. Both were rushed to hospital, where Berger died from her injuries six days later. Dauberson never fully recovered emotionally or physically from the crash, which ended her career as a singer.

== Death ==
Dauberson died in 1979, at the age of 54.

She was buried in the town of Saint-Claude in the Jura department, where she had spent part of her youth.

== Filmography ==
- 1951 : L'Inconnue des cinq cités (A Tale of Five Cities)
- 1954 : Soirs de Paris, by Jean Laviron
- 1957 : Et par ici la sortie, by Willy Rozier : Florina
- 1957 : C'est arrivé à 36 chandelles, by Henri Diamant-Berger : herself
- 1966 : Du rififi à Paname, by Denys de La Patellière : Léa

Preceded by none	France in the Eurovision Song Contest; 1956 (and Mathé Altéry with Le temps perdu)	Succeeded by Paule Desjardins with La Belle amour
