= Eurovision Song Contest 1956 =

International song competition

Date and venue
- Final: 24 May 1956
- Venue: Teatro Kursaal; Lugano, Switzerland

Organisation
- Organiser: European Broadcasting Union (EBU)
- Jury president: Rolf Liebermann

Production
- Host broadcaster: Swiss Broadcasting Corporation (SRG SSR); Radio svizzera italiana (RSI)
- Director: Franco Marazzi
- Musical director: Fernando Paggi
- Presenter: Lohengrin Filipello

Participants
- Number of entries: 14 (Note: Seven countries represented by two songs each)
- Debuting countries: Belgium; France; Germany; Italy; Luxembourg; Netherlands; Switzerland
- Participation map: Participating countries

Vote
- Voting system: Two-member juries from each country; each juror scored each song between 1 and 10
- Winning song: Switzerland "Refrain"

The Eurovision Song Contest 1956, originally titled the Gran premio Eurovisione 1956 della canzone europea (English: Grand Prix of the Eurovision song competition 1956; French: Grand prix Eurovision 1956 de la chanson européenne), was the first edition of the Eurovision Song Contest, held on 24 May 1956 at the Teatro Kursaal in Lugano, Switzerland, and presented by Lohengrin Filipello. It was organised by the European Broadcasting Union (EBU) and host broadcaster Radio svizzera italiana (RSI) on behalf of the Swiss Broadcasting Corporation (SRG SSR). It is the only time that the contest has been hosted by a solo male presenter.

Inspired principally by the Italian Sanremo Music Festival, held annually since 1951, the concept of a televised European song contest, initially proposed by Italian broadcaster Radiotelevisione italiana (RAI), was formulated by an EBU committee led by Swiss broadcaster and executive Marcel Bezençon. Following approval at the EBU's General Assembly in 1955, the rules and structure of the contest were agreed upon. Several of the rules utilised in this first contest would subsequently be altered for future editions, and it remains the only edition in which each country was represented by two songs, with a voting process which was held in secret and where juries could vote for the entries from their own country.

Broadcasters from seven countries participated in the inaugural edition of the contest, and the first winner was the host country Switzerland, with the song "Refrain" performed by Lys Assia. The result was determined by an assembled jury composed of two jurors from each country, with each juror giving each song a score between one and ten. Only the winning country and song were announced at the conclusion of the event, with the results of the remaining participants unknown. Even though it was broadcast on television via the Eurovision network and radio in more than ten countries, no video footage of the event is known to exist, with the only video available being of the reprise performance; the majority of the broadcast is, however, available in audio.

== Origins ==
The European Broadcasting Union (EBU) was formed in 1950 among 23 organisations with the aim of facilitating creative cooperation and the exchange of television programmes.

The word "Eurovision" was first used as a telecommunications term in the United Kingdom in 1951, in reference to a programme by the British Broadcasting Corporation (BBC) being relayed by Dutch television, and was subsequently used as the title for the union's new transmission network upon its creation in 1954.

Following the formation of the EBU, a number of notable events were transmitted through its networks in several European countries, including Belgium, France, West Germany, the Netherlands and the United Kingdom. A series of international exchange programmes were subsequently organised for 1954, with this "European Television Season" relayed live across Europe through the Eurovision network.

Following this series of transmissions, a "Programme Committee" was set up within the EBU to investigate new initiatives for cooperation between broadcasters each year, with Marcel Bezençon of the Swiss Broadcasting Corporation (SRG SSR) serving as the committee's first president. This committee agreed to study the concept for a new televised European song contest during a meeting in January 1955, a concept initially proposed by the Italian broadcaster Radiotelevisione italiana (RAI) and inspired by its both the Sanremo Music Festival, held annually since 1951, and the Venice International Song Festival held in 1955. The new European contest was subsequently approved at the EBU's annual General Assembly in October 1955, leading to the creation of the European Grand Prix.

== Location ==
Teatro Kursaal, Lugano – host venue of the 1956 contest

The first Eurovision Song Contest took place in Lugano, Switzerland, following an offer by the SRG SSR to stage the event at the EBU's General Assembly in October 1955.

In addition, Switzerland was a logical choice from a technical perspective for the hosting of what was a live, simultaneous, cross-border transmission, as its geographically central location in Europe facilitated terrestrial broadcasts across the continent, as well as being the location of the EBU's headquarters.

The selected venue for the contest was the Teatro Kursaal, a casino and former theatre situated on Lake Lugano. It had a capacity of 700 seats. 400 seats in the stalls were reserved for invited guests whereas tickets for the balcony were on sale from 17 May 1956 for CHF 20.

The theatre, used for theatrical and musical performances, ballroom dance and other shows, closed shortly after featuring its last performance in April 1997 before being demolished in 2001 to make room for the extension of the casino.

== Participants ==
Eurovision Song Contest 1956 – Participation summaries by country
- Belgium; France; Germany; Italy; Luxembourg; Netherlands; Switzerland

Broadcasters from seven countries participated in this first contest – Belgium, France, Italy, Luxembourg, the Netherlands, Switzerland and West Germany (identified simply as "Germany" in the contest). Those from Austria and Denmark are believed to have also been interested in participating; however, they reportedly missed the cut-off point for entry. These two, as well as the BBC in the United Kingdom, would broadcast the contest along with those in the participating countries, with the BBC having chosen to not send an entry for this event in favour of organising its own contest, the Festival of British Popular Songs.

Two of the performers, Switzerland's Lys Assia and Luxembourg's Michèle Arnaud, performed both entries for their respective countries. Assia, as well as the Netherlands' Corry Brokken and Belgium's Fud Leclerc, would return to compete in the contest in future editions, with Assia returning in 1957 and 1958, Brokken also returning in 1957 and 1958, and Leclerc returning in 1958, 1960, and 1962.

Eurovision Song Contest 1956 participants
Country	Broadcaster	Artist	Song	Language	Songwriter(s)	Conductor
Belgium	INR	Fud Leclerc	"Messieurs les noyés de la Seine"	French	Jean Miret; Robert Montal; Jack Say	Léo Souris
Belgium	INR	Mony Marc	"Le Plus Beau Jour de ma vie"	French	Claude Alix; David Bee	Léo Souris
France	RTF	Mathé Altéry	"Le Temps perdu"	French	André Lodge; Rachèle Thoreau	Franck Pourcel
France	RTF	Dany Dauberson	"Il est là"	French	Simone Vallauris	Franck Pourcel
Germany	NWRV (Note: On behalf of the German public broadcasting consortium ARD)	Freddy Quinn	"So geht das jede Nacht"	German	Peter Moesser; Lotar Olias	Fernando Paggi
Germany	NWRV	Walter Andreas Schwarz	"Im Wartesaal zum großen Glück" (Note: Credited as "Das Lied vom großen Glück")	German	Walter Andreas Schwarz	Fernando Paggi
Italy	RAI	Franca Raimondi	"Aprite le finestre"	Italian	Virgilio Panzuti; Pino Perotti	Gian Stellari
Italy	RAI	Tonina Torrielli	"Amami se vuoi"	Italian	Vittorio Mascheroni; Mario Panzeri	Gian Stellari
Luxembourg	CLT	Michèle Arnaud	"Les Amants de minuit"	French	Pierre Lambry; Simone Laurencin	Jacques Lasry
Luxembourg	CLT	Michèle Arnaud	"Ne crois pas"	French	Christian Guittreau	Jacques Lasry
Netherlands	NTS	Corry Brokken	"Voorgoed voorbij"	Dutch	Jelle de Vries	Fernando Paggi (Note: Dolf van der Linden, who was originally selected to lead the orchestra for the Dutch entries, was unable to attend the contest and was replaced by the host musical director Paggi.)
Netherlands	NTS	Jetty Paerl	"De vogels van Holland"	Dutch	Cor Lemaire; Annie M.G. Schmidt	Fernando Paggi
Switzerland	SRG SSR	Lys Assia	"Das alte Karussell"	German	Georg Betz-Stahl	Fernando Paggi
Switzerland	SRG SSR	Lys Assia	"Refrain"	French	Émile Gardaz; Géo Voumard	Fernando Paggi

== Production and format ==
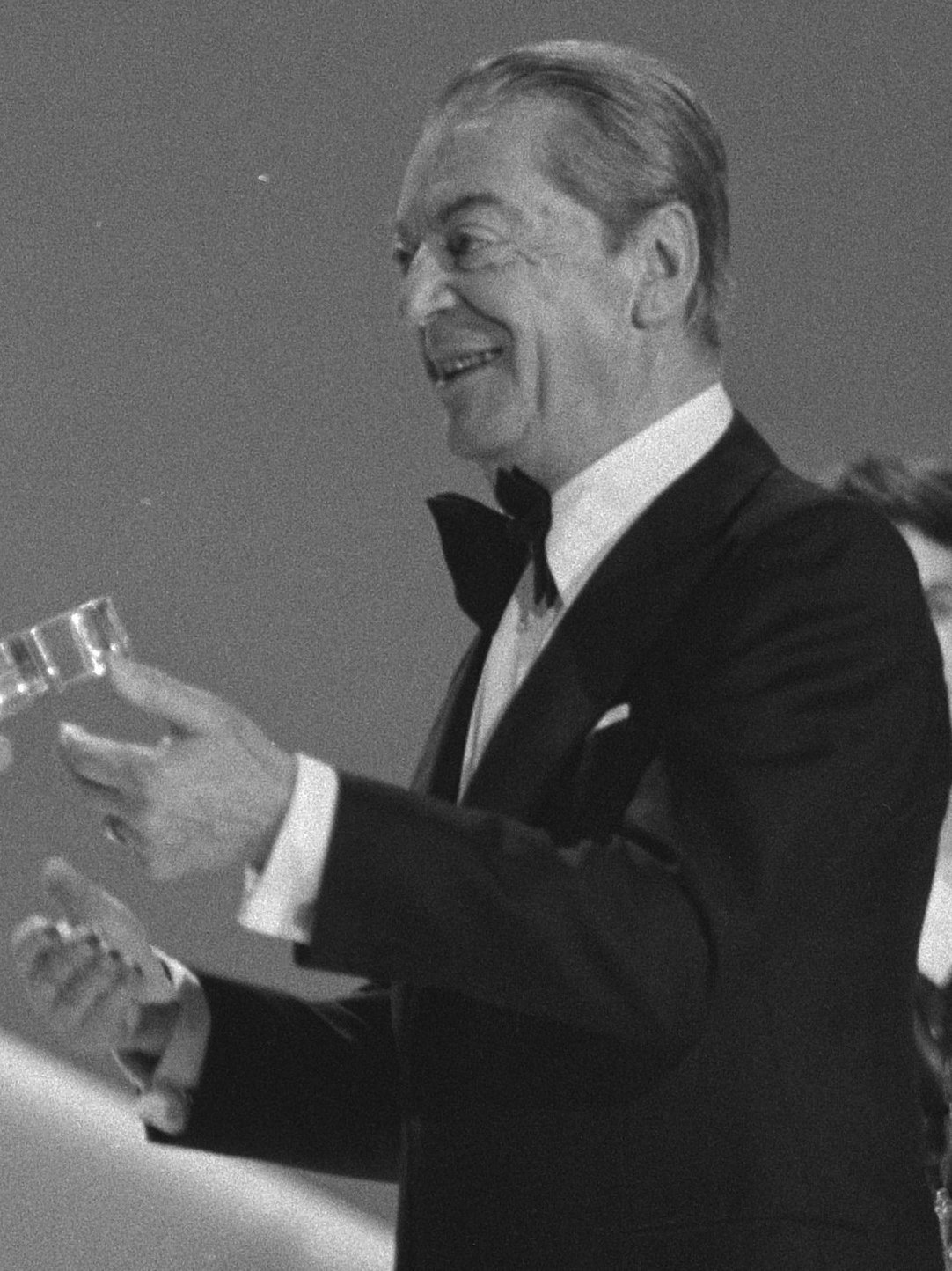
Marcel Bezençon (pictured in 1980) was instrumental in the creation of the contest as president of the EBU's Programme Committee.

A planning sub-group, headed by Eduard Hass of SRG SSR, was formed following the sign-off on the organisation of the event to build out the rules of the competition. Taking inspiration from the Sanremo Music Festival and the Venice International Song Festival as a basis in planning the new contest, the group made several amendments and additions to these rules to suit its international nature. Ideas suggested but ultimately rejected during this planning phase included featuring each song a second time with a piano accompaniment instead of orchestral backing, as well as technical initiatives such as a separate producer from each participating broadcaster involved in the contest's organisation. Prize money for the winners was also ruled out at this stage. The rules of the contest were finalised and distributed to EBU members in early 1956. The rules set out in detail the criteria for the participating songs and performers; production details and requirements; timelines for the submission of materials by the participating broadcasters; the method by which the winning song would be determined; details related to the financing of the event; and the responsibilities which lay with the host broadcaster and the participating broadcasters.

The inaugural Eurovision Song Contest was produced by the Italian-language radio broadcaster Radio svizzera italiana (RSI), in cooperation with the television service of SRG SSR, which brought a television production truck from Zurich to Lugano. (Note: In 1956, SRG SSR had a single television service, which was the only one operating in the country. This service was directly managed by the corporation with a provisional license, and had two production centers, one in Zurich for German-speaking Switzerland and one in Geneva for French-speaking Switzerland.) Three television cameras were used inside the auditorium to broadcast the event. Franco Marazzi served as director of the event on behalf of RSI, with Rolf Liebermann overseeing the production and the jury deliberations on behalf of the EBU as its executive supervisor and jury president.

Each participating broadcaster submitted into the contest a maximum of two songs not exceeding three to three-and-a-half minutes in duration, which must have been solely original compositions. They had sole discretion on how to select their entries for the contest but were strongly encouraged by the EBU to hold their own national contests to determine their representatives. Each song was accompanied by a 24-piece orchestra, with members of the Radiosa Orchestra supplemented by strings of the Italian Swiss Radio Symphony Orchestra, presided over by the contest's musical director, Fernando Paggi; the contest's musical director was also available to conduct the performances of the participating entries if a separate conductor was not otherwise appointed by that country.

Broadcasters were required to submit to the EBU by 10 May 1956 scores for their participating songs for use by the orchestra, audio recordings of each song, and copies of the songs lyrics in the original language, as well as translations into French or English to aid the jury members and commentators. The confirmed selection of each country's musical director (if separate to that of the host) was required to be communicated between 21 and 24 May. According to the rules, the order in which the countries and songs were performed was to be determined artistically by the host broadcaster, with input and support by the musical directors from each country. However, a draw determining the order of countries took place in Gardone a few days prior to the contest. (Note: A meeting of EBU's working group GTV/2 (Eurovision) took place from 21 to 25 May in Gardone.) Rehearsals in the contest venue with the competing artists and the orchestra began on 21 May 1956.

Following the performance of all songs, the winner was determined by an assembled jury composed of two individuals from each country, with each individual member rating secretly each song between one and ten, including those representing their own country, with higher scores given to more appreciated songs. The jury followed the contest in the bridge room in the same venue in Lugano through a small television screen, replicating the conditions as close as possible to how viewers at home would watch the contest. The winning song was thus that which gained the highest score from the votes cast by all jury members. In the event of a tie between two or more entries all songs with the highest score would have been declared winners.

In news reports at the time, according to one Dutch juror, the jury members were removed from the jury room once they had cast their votes and were therefore unable to follow the tabulation of the final results. The jury members from Luxembourg were unable to attend the contest in Lugano, and subsequently the EBU allowed two Swiss nationals to vote in their place. This would remain the only contest in which many of these rules would be utilised, and several changes were made ahead of the 1957 contest. These included restricting each country to only one song, expanding the number of performers allowed to participate for each country, introducing a more visible voting system, and restricting each country from voting for their own entry.

== Contest overview ==
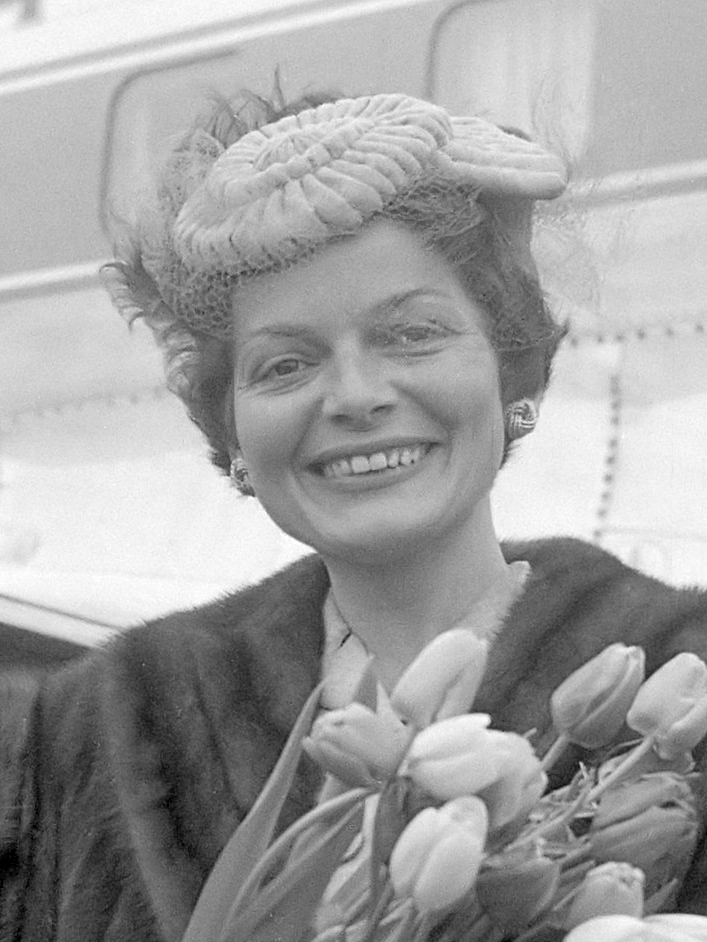
Switzerland's Lys Assia (pictured in 1957) was the first winner of the Eurovision Song Contest, and would represent her country in the contest again in 1957 and 1958.

The contest was held on 24 May 1956, beginning at 21:00 (CET) with an approximate duration of 1 hour 40 minutes. The event was hosted in Italian by Lohengrin Filipello. This remains the only time in which the contest was hosted by a solo male presenter, and one of only two contests not to feature a female presenter, alongside the 2017 contest held 61 years later. Additionally this would remain the only contest to feature a male presenter for 22 years, until the 1978 contest featured a male and female presenting duo.

During the interval between the final competing act and the announcement of the winner, performances by Les Joyeux Rossignols and Les Trois Ménestrels were featured to entertain the audience, with the latter performing "Guerre de Troie" and "Ma mie, ma caravelle" along with other works. Upon the announcement of the results, the winning artist returned to the stage for a reprise performance of the winning song to end the broadcast.

The winning song was "Refrain", composed by Géo Voumard, written by Émile Gardaz, performed by Lys Assia and representing the host country Switzerland. During the reprise performance of the winning song, Assia became emotional and suffered a lapse in memory of the song's lyrics, subsequently requesting a restart by the orchestra. After the show, a reception for the participating delegations was held in the upper hall of Teatro Kursaal on behalf of the host city Lugano, the canton of Ticino, and SRG SSR.

The full results of the contest were not revealed, with only the winning song named at the end of the show by the jury president Rolf Liebermann; the full breakdown of the scores of each juror has not been retained by the EBU, and is presumed lost. Attempts to reconstruct the voting through interviews with jury members have also failed to reveal a reliable result. An article in Italian newspaper La Stampa published on 25 May 1956, the day after the contest, reported that Switzerland's winning entry received a score of 102 in total, while in an article published in the Italian magazine Settimana Radio TV in the weeks following the contest, Stelio Molo, the director-general of RSI, revealed that the gap between the first- and second-placed songs had been two points, and that the remaining entries had also finished close to the winner. These claims have not been corroborated by the contest's organisers in the years since.

Winner

Results of the Eurovision Song Contest 1956
R/O	Country	Artist	Song
1	Netherlands	Jetty Paerl	"De vogels van Holland"
2	Switzerland	Lys Assia	"Das alte Karussell"
3	Belgium	Fud Leclerc	"Messieurs les noyés de la Seine"
4	Germany	Walter Andreas Schwarz	"Im Wartesaal zum großen Glück"
5	France	Mathé Altéry	"Le Temps perdu"
6	Luxembourg	Michèle Arnaud	"Ne crois pas"
7	Italy	Franca Raimondi	"Aprite le finestre"
8	Netherlands	Corry Brokken	"Voorgoed voorbij"
9	Switzerland	Lys Assia	"Refrain"
10	Belgium	Mony Marc	"Le Plus Beau Jour de ma vie"
11	Germany	Freddy Quinn	"So geht das jede Nacht"
12	France	Dany Dauberson	"Il est là"
13	Luxembourg	Michèle Arnaud	"Les Amants de minuit"
14	Italy	Tonina Torrielli	"Amami se vuoi"

== Broadcasts ==
Broadcasters competing in the event were required to relay the contest via its networks; non-participating EBU member broadcasters were also able to relay the contest. In addition to the television channels of the seven participating broadcasters and three non-participating passive broadcasters, the contest was also reportedly broadcast live on seven radio networks (Note: The Swiss-Italian listings magazine Radioprogramma lists Radio Bremen, Bayerischer Rundfunk, RTF, RAI, and the three Swiss stations Beromünster, Sottens and Monte-Ceneri as those seven radio networks with live broadcasting. However, according to German press, Bayerischer Rundfunk only carried out a delayed broadcast on 30 June 1956 at 20:15 (CET)) and recorded for later transmission by another 13. The United Kingdom's BBC took only partial live transmission of the event, joining 45 minutes into the contest and only showing the second set of entries from each country. Due to a technical fault, the transmission of images was interrupted during Mathé Altéry's performance for about three minutes on German, Danish, and French television.

No video footage of the whole contest is known to exist, with the only known footage being clips of the reprise performance of the winning song via newsreel and other recordings. As such, this is one of only two editions of the contest, along with the 1964 contest, to not have video recordings of the full event retained. Audio of most of the contest has, however, survived, with only the majority of the contest's interval acts currently lost. Attempts to find audiovisual materials related to the contest have yielded some results in recent years, including a large cache of photographs and some video footage taken by Swiss photographer Vincenzo Vicari from inside the venue. In 2026, the EBU launched a call for help in order to find video recordings from both editions.

Broadcasters were able to send commentators to provide coverage of the contest in their own native language and to relay information about the artists and songs to their television viewers. Known details on the broadcasts in each country, including the specific broadcasting stations and commentators, are shown in the tables below.

Broadcasters and commentators in participating countries
Country	Broadcaster	Channel(s)	Commentator(s)	Ref.
Belgium	NIR/INR	INR	Raymond Colbert	
Belgium	NIR/INR	NIR	Piet te Nuyl Jr.	
France	RTF	RTF	Michelle Rebel	
France	RTF	Paris-Inter		
Germany	ARD	Deutsches Fernsehen	Irene Koss	
Germany	BR	Radio München (Note: Delayed broadcast on 30 June 1956 at 20:15 (CET))		
Germany	RB	Zweites Programm		
Germany	SWF	SWF2 (Note: Delayed broadcast on 18 June 1956 at 23:00 (CET))		
Italy	RAI	RAI Televisione	Franco Marazzi	
Italy	RAI	Secondo Programma		
Luxembourg	CLT	Télé-Luxembourg		
Netherlands	NTS	NTS	Piet te Nuyl Jr.	
Switzerland	SRG SSR	SRG	Fritz Schäuffele	
Switzerland	SRG SSR	TSR	Raymond Colbert	
Switzerland	SRG SSR	Radio Beromünster		
Switzerland	SRG SSR	Radio Sottens		
Switzerland	SRG SSR	Radio Monte Ceneri		

Broadcasters and commentators in non-participating countries
Country	Broadcaster	Channel(s)	Commentator(s)	Ref.
Austria	ORF	ORF		
Belgian Congo	NIR/INR	RNB Congo (Note: Delayed broadcast on 24 June 1956 at 21:30 (WAT))		
Denmark	Statsradiofonien	Statsradiofonien TV	Jens Frederik Lawaetz	
Morocco	Radio-Maroc	Radio-Maroc (Note: Delayed broadcast on 17 June 1956 at 20:20 UTC)		
United Kingdom	BBC	BBC Television Service	Wilfrid Thomas	

== Notes and references ==
=== Bibliography ===
- "Règlement du Grand Prix Eurovision 1956 de la Chanson Européenne (version définitive)" [Rules of the Grand Prix of the Eurovision Song Competition 1956 (final version)] (PDF) (in French). Geneva, Switzerland: European Broadcasting Union (EBU). Archived from the original (PDF) on 20 June 2016.
- Dubin, Adam; Vuletic, Dean; Obregón, Antonio, eds. (2022). The Eurovision Song Contest as a Cultural Phenomenon: From Concert Halls to the Halls of Academia. Abingdon-on-Thames, United Kingdom; New York, NY, United States: Routledge. ISBN 978-1-003-18893-3.
- O'Connor, John Kennedy (2010). The Eurovision Song Contest: The Official History (2nd ed.). London, United Kingdom: Carlton Books. ISBN 978-1-84732-521-1.
- Roxburgh, Gordon (2012). Songs for Europe: The United Kingdom at the Eurovision Song Contest. Vol. One: The 1950s and 1960s. Prestatyn, United Kingdom: Telos Publishing. ISBN 978-1-84583-065-6.
- Thorsson, Leif; Verhage, Martin (2006). Melodifestivalen genom tiderna : de svenska uttagningarna och internationella finalerna [Melodifestivalen through the ages: the Swedish selections and international finals] (in Swedish). Stockholm, Sweden: Premium Publishing. ISBN 91-89136-29-2.
