= Oin =

Oin, Óin or OIN may refer to:

== Folklore and fiction ==
- Óin, son of Gróin, a Dwarf from J. R. R. Tolkien's writings, companion of Thorin Oakenshield
- Oin-Oin, a character of Swiss folklore

== Other ==
- Open Invention Network, a company specialising in Linux patents
- Oneida Indian Nation, the New York tribe that operates Turning Stone Resort & Casino
- One language, specifically Inebu, by ISO 639-3 code

== See also ==
- Eoin, an Irish name pronounced O-in
