= Refrain (Lys Assia song) =

1956 song by Lys Assia

Song by Lys Assia
- Language: French
- Released: 1956
- Genre: Chanson; orchestral pop
- Composer: Géo Voumard
- Lyricist: Émile Gardaz

Eurovision Song Contest 1956 entry
- Country: Switzerland
- Artist: Lys Assia
- Language: French
- Composer: Géo Voumard
- Lyricist: Émile Gardaz
- Conductor: Fernando Paggi

Finals performance
- Final result: 1st

Entry chronology
- ◄ "Das alte Karussell" (1956)
- "L'enfant que j'étais" (1957) ►

Official performance
- "Refrain" (audio) on YouTube "Refrain" (reprise in film) on YouTube

"Refrain" is a song recorded by Swiss singer Lys Assia with music composed by Géo Voumard and lyrics written by Émile Gardaz. It represented Switzerland in the inaugural edition of the Eurovision Song Contest and became the first winner of the contest.

== Background ==
=== Conception ===
"Refrain" was composed by Géo Voumard with French lyrics by Émile Gardaz, and recorded by Lys Assia. She also recorded the song in German as "Refrain, du gold'ner Traum aus meiner Jugendzeit", and in English as "Last night".

The song is in the classic chanson mode and laments the lost loves of the singer's "adolescence". The French original reads "vingt ans", which can also be rendered "twenties" in English.

=== Eurovision ===
On 28 April 1956, "Refrain" was one of the five songs with which Lys Assia competed in the Grand Prix Européen de la Chanson: Finale suisse, the eleven-song national final organized by the Swiss Broadcasting Corporation (SRG SSR) to select its two songs and performers for the first edition of the Eurovision Song Contest. As in this first edition two entries from each country were allowed, two songs won the national final, "Refrains" and "Das alte Karussell", both performed by Assia, becoming the Swiss entries for Eurovision.

On 24 May 1956, the first Eurovision Song Contest was held at Teatro Kursaal in Lugano hosted by Radio svizzera italiana (RSI) on behalf of the SRG SSR, and broadcast live throughout the continent. The countries performed in the same order via two rounds and Assia had previously performed "Das alte Karussell" in German as the second song of the evening. "Refrain" thus performed ninth, following the Netherlands' "Voorgoed voorbij" by Corry Brokken and preceding Belgium's "Le plus beau jour de ma vie" by Mony Marc. Assia was one of only two performers, alongside Luxembourg, to represent their country with both entries. Fernando Paggi conducted the live orchestra in the performance of the Swiss entries. No video recording of the performances is known to have survived, only footage of the winning reprise exists in addition to the audio of the full radio broadcast.

After the interval act, "Refrain" was declared the winner without revealing the other song's ranks nor the number of points to the winner as well. Claims were raised that it won as a result of procedures which included a secret voting with an option for juries to vote for their own country's songs, alongside allowing the Swiss jury to vote on behalf of Luxembourg which couldn't send juries.

The 25 May 1956 issue of the Italian newspaper La Stampa, published the day after the contest, wrote that "Refrain" received 102 points, which represented 72.8% of potential the theoretical total available for each song. This is based on a claim that each jury member ranked each song between 1 and 10 points, meaning each song could have obtained a maximum of 120 to 140 points; depending on whether jury members also voted for their own country.

The two songs were succeeded as Swiss representative at the 1957 contest by Assia again with "L'enfant que j'étais", and "Refrain" was succeeded as Contest winner in 1957 by "Net als toen" by Corry Brokken representing the Netherlands.

=== Aftermath ===
Assia performed her song in the Eurovision twenty-fifth anniversary show Songs of Europe held on 22 August 1981 in Mysen. In the Eurovision fiftieth anniversary competition Congratulations: 50 Years of the Eurovision Song Contest, held on 22 October 2005 in Copenhagen, she performed the song as part of the interval acts. Assia revealed in 2011 that she dedicated all royalties she made from the song to charity.

According to the data calculated at "Hit Parade Italia", which presents weekly and top 100 yearly positions for a mix of both Italian and international songs, "Refrain" is ranked the 50th most successful song in Italy in 1956.

== Legacy ==
A cover version of "Refrain" sung by Mathé Altéry, one of the French representatives in the Eurovision Song Contest 1956, was published in autumn 1956. Other cover versions were recorded by Cora Vaucaire, Marie-José and Jula De Palma.

None	Eurovision Song Contest winners 1956	Succeeded by "Net als toen" by Corry Brokken
