= Paule Desjardins =

- Born: Paule Marguerite Dejardin; 19 April 1929; Calais, France
- Died: 31 December 2007 (aged 78) Millau, France
- Genres: Chanson
- Occupation: Singer
- Years active: 1957–1992

Paule Desjardins (19 April 1929 – 31 December 2007), also known as Paule Canat, was a French singer, and fashion designer. She represented France in the Eurovision Song Contest 1957 with the song "La Belle Amour", which finished second with 17 points.

In the early 1960s, Desjardins ended her musical career to marry French industrialist Charles Canat (11 September 1921 – 1 December 2007). She started a new career as a lingerie designer in Millau. From 1960 to 1992, she was responsible for the creation of collections, developing new clothing lines that played an important role in the development of the company.

Desjardins died on 31 December 2007, at the age of 78. She and Canat had a son, Joël, who ran his father's company from 1991 to 1996, before selling it to Saaly Holding.

Preceded by Mathé Altéry with "Le Temps perdu" and Dany Dauberson with "Il est là"	France in the Eurovision Song Contest; 1957	Succeeded by André Claveau with "Dors, mon amour"
