= Fud Leclerc =

Belgian singer and musician

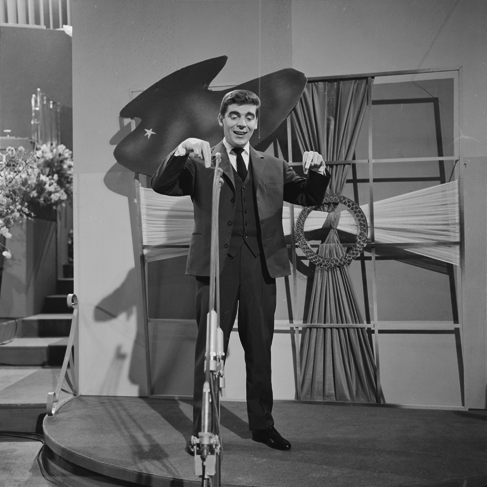
- Fud Leclerc at the Eurovision Song Contest 1958
- Born: Fernand Urbain Dominic Leclerc; 1924; Montluçon, Auvergne, France
- Died: 20 September 2010 (age 85–86); Ganshoren, Belgium
- Occupation: Singer

Ferdinand Urbain Dominic Leclerc (French pronunciation: [fyd ləklɛʁ], 1924 – 20 September 2010) was a Belgian singer, who was also the pianist of Juliette Gréco. Leclerc had a career as a pianist, accordionist, songwriter and singer before retiring to travel the world. On his return to Belgium, he began a new career as a building contractor. More recently, Leclerc was invited to the Belgian national final for Eurovision 2005 by the Belgian TV network RTBF as a guest star.

Leclerc represented Belgium at the Eurovision Song Contest four times:

Year	Song performed
1956	"Messieurs les noyés de la Seine" (The drowned men of the Seine), music by Jean Miret and Jacques Say, lyrics by Robert Montal, placing and score unknown
1958	"Ma petite chatte" (My little darling), music and lyrics by André Dohet, 5th place (of 10), 8 points
1960	"Mon amour pour toi" (My love for you), music by Jacques Say, lyric by Robert Montal, 6th place (of 13), 9 points
1962	"Ton nom" (Your name), music by Eric Channe, lyric by Tony Golan, tied for last place (of 16), 0 points

The song Leclerc performed in the 1962 Contest is notable for being the (joint) first song performed at the Contest that scored zero points.

At the time of his death Leclerc was retired, and living in Brussels.

Awards and achievements
Preceded by none	Belgium in the Eurovision Song Contest; 1956 (with Mony Marc)	Succeeded by Bobbejaan Schoepen with "Straatdeuntje"
Preceded by Bobbejaan Schoepen with "Straatdeuntje"	Belgium in the Eurovision Song Contest; 1958	Succeeded by Bob Benny with "Hou toch van mij"
Preceded by Bob Benny with "Hou toch van mij"	Belgium in the Eurovision Song Contest; 1960	Succeeded by Bob Benny with "September, gouden roos"
Preceded by Bob Benny with "September, gouden roos"	Belgium in the Eurovision Song Contest; 1962	Succeeded by Jacques Raymond with "Waarom?"
