= Lohengrin Filipello =

Swiss television presenter (1912–1981)

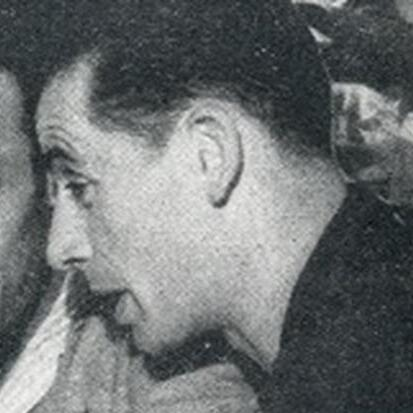
- Filipello in 1948
- Born: Lohengrin Umberto Gaetano Albino Filipello; October 1912; Milan, Lombardy, Kingdom of Italy
- Died: 19 June 1981 (aged 68); Lugano, Ticino, Switzerland
- Occupations: Teacher; journalist; reporter; presenter
- Known for: Hosting the inaugural Eurovision Song Contest of 1956
- Spouse: Claudina Clelia Laboranti (m. 1941)
- Children: 1

Lohengrin Umberto Gaetano Albino Filipello (Italian pronunciation: [ˈlɔːeŋɡriɱ filiˈpɛllo]; October 1912 – 19 June 1981) was a Swiss-Italian journalist and television presenter who worked for Radiotelevisione svizzera (RSI). He is best known for presenting the inaugural Eurovision Song Contest in 1956 at his home city, Lugano.

== Life ==
=== Personal life ===
Filipello was born in 1912 to parents Arnaldo Filipello (1887–1953) and Margherita Mongillon in Milan, Italy. At age 2, he and his family moved to Lugano, Switzerland, where he would continue to reside for the remainder of his life. In February 1941, he married to Claudina Clelia Laboranti (1915–?). In July 1944, Nicola Arnaldo Gaetano Filipello, their son, was born.

=== Career ===
In 1931, he received his teaching diploma and later earned his teaching certificate in 1938. In that same year, he would become a journalist for Radiotelevisione svizzera (RSI), reporting then-current worldwide affairs. He would briefly continue to teach before ultimately switching to journalism completely in 1945.

From 1947 to 1975, he was also a radio presenter, while occasionally hosting in television programs. He and Sergio Maspoli hosted the Swiss Solidarity's first broadcast in May 1947.

A notable instance in his journalist career was in an interview with former Chinese Marshal Chen-Yi during his stay in Geneva, which was broadcast in Switzerland on 3 August, 1962. Among the topics they discussed were the eventual Sino-Indian border dispute and war, Great Chinese Famine, relations between communist China and Taiwan, the future of China under its communist government, and the then-recent International Agreement on the Neutrality of Laos, which took place in Geneva.

=== Eurovision Song Contest ===
In 1956, Filipello was chosen to host the first Eurovision Song Contest staged in Lugano, Switzerland. He was the only male presenter to host the competition until Léon Zitrone was co-presenter in the 1978 contest. As of 2026, Filipello also has the distinction as the only man who has hosted the contest by himself.

== Retirement and death ==
Following his retirement from hosting in 1975, he dedicated himself to restructuring the RSI Library and Documentation. At the end of 1979, he announced his retirement from his journalism and presenting career after nearly 40 years of contributing, but continued to appear in Swiss radio broadcasts. On 19 June 1981, Filipello died before turning 69 following a long period of being ill, shortly before he was supposed to appear in Pomeriggio feriale, a radio show he regularly hosted.

== See also ==
- List of Eurovision Song Contest presenters

Preceded by None	Eurovision Song Contest presenter 1956	Succeeded by (West Germany) Anaid Iplicjian
