= France in the Eurovision Song Contest 1956 =

- Eurovision Song Contest 1956
- Participating broadcaster: Radiodiffusion-Télévision Française (RTF)
- Country: France
- Selection process: Artist: Unknown; Song: Le palmarès de la chanson inédite

Competing entries

First entry
- Song: "Le Temps perdu"
- Artist: Mathé Altéry
- Songwriters: André Lodge; Rachèle Thoreau

Second entry
- Song: "Il est là"
- Artist: Dany Dauberson
- Songwriter: Simone Vallauris

Placement
- Final result: N/A

Participation chronology

France was represented at the Eurovision Song Contest 1956 with two songs: "Le Temps perdu", composed by André Lodge, with lyrics by Rachèle Thoreau, and performed by Mathé Altéry; and "Il est là", written by Simone Vallauris, and performed by Dany Dauberson. The French participating broadcaster, Radiodiffusion-Télévision Française (RTF), selected its two entries through the radio program Le palmarès de la chanson inédite. "Le Temps perdu" was the first-ever entry from France performed in the Eurovision Song Contest.

== Before Eurovision ==
According to TV listings magazine Télévision Programme Magazine, Radiodiffusion-Télévision Française (RTF) used the radio program Le palmarès de la chanson inédite to choose its two entries for the Eurovision Song Contest 1956. In March 1956, RTF asked interested songwriters to submit songs for the program if they wanted to be selected for Eurovision. Le palmarès de la chanson inédite aired regularly on Saturday evenings on Programme parisien in 1956 and 1957. Its third season started on 7 April 1956, with finals held on 7 July 1956. RTF stated that also winning songs of the previous seasons would compete to be selected as French entries. The program was directed by Michel du Plessis and presented by Maurice Yvain and Louis Poterat, with an orchestra led by Franck Pourcel accompanying the artists.

Of the two French songs chosen for the Eurovision Song Contest, "Il est là" can be retrieved in radio listings as participating in the program, in this case for the program aired on 5 May 1956, and sung by Marina Audrey.

Programs of season 3 prior to 16 May (Eurovision lineup announcement)
Date	Artists and songs	Ref.
7 April 1956	Jean-Fred Mêlé – "Chanson pour Sylvie"; Hélène Romanée – "T'es dingue"; Jean-Pierre Dujay – "C‘est notre amour"; Germaine Duclos – "Pas la peine de s‘en faire"	
14 April 1956	Rose Deshayes – "Un grand amour"; Aimée Doniat – "Les Démoiselles de Neuilly"; Wilma Nor – "La Chanteuse de blues"; Serge Reval – "Te souviens-tu ?"	
21 April 1956	Germaine Duclos – "Pas d‘baratin"; Bob et Dyna – "Les Pêcheurs de Floride"; Jack Gauthier – "Oh ! la ! di ! hé !"; Laura Mellec – "Souvenirs"	
28 April 1956	Danièle Georges – "Ta chanson, mon amour"; Jean Veldy – "Le Napolitain"; Françoise Guy – "Prends cette lettre"; Jacques Lambert – "Habits, Chiffons"	
5 May 1956	Hélène Romanée – "Le Chapeau fleuri"; Roger Perrinoz – "Les Ponts du paradis"; Marina Audrey – "Il est là"; Jean-Pierre Hébrard – "Déclaration légale"	
12 May 1956	Jean Lambert – "Alger la blanche"; Hélène Romanée – "La Pêche aux goujons"; Jack Gauthier – "Jojo le catcheur"; Nadia Dauty – "Ballade à Paris"	

"Le Temps perdu", written by André Lodge (music) and Rachèle Thoreau (lyrics), and "Il est là", written by Simone Vallauris, were chosen as the French entries. It is unknown how Mathé Altéry and Dany Dauberson were ultimately selected as the participants, or how the song "Le temps perdu" was chosen, as the song wasn't listed in the shows in the third season before 16 May, earliest report of the Eurovision participants.

== At Eurovision ==
The Eurovision Song Contest 1956 took place at the Teatro Kursaal in Lugano, Switzerland, on 24 May 1956. "Le Temps perdu", sung by Mathé Altéry, was performed 5th at the contest and "Il est là", sung by Dany Dauberson, was performed 12th. Both of the French entries were conducted by Franck Pourcel.

Each participating broadcaster appointed two jury members who voted by giving between one and ten points to each song, including those representing their own country. One of the French jury members was Maurice Yvain.

The full results of the contest were not revealed and have not been retained by the European Broadcasting Union (EBU). Eurovision Song Contest 1956 was televised in France on RTF with commentary by Michelle Rebel, and also broadcast live on radio Paris-Inter.
