= Belgium in the Eurovision Song Contest 1956 =

- Eurovision Song Contest 1956
- Participating broadcaster: Institut national de radiodiffusion (INR) (Note: Institut national de radiodiffusion (INR) was the official French-language name of the National Broadcasting Institute (NIR/INR).)
- Country: Belgium
- Selection process: Finale Nationale du Grand Prix Eurovision 1956 de la Chanson Europeenne
- Selection date: 15 April 1956

Competing entries

First entry
- Song: "Messieurs les noyés de la Seine"
- Artist: Fud Leclerc
- Songwriters: Jean Miret; Jack Say; Robert Montal

Second entry
- Song: "Le Plus Beau Jour de ma vie"
- Artist: Mony Marc
- Songwriters: David Bée; Claude Alix

Placement
- Final result: N/A

Participation chronology

Belgium was represented at the Eurovision Song Contest 1956 with two songs: "Messieurs les noyés de la Seine", composed by Jean Miret and Jack Say, with lyrics by Robert Montal, and performed by Fud Leclerc; and "Le Plus Beau Jour de ma vie", composed by Claude Alix, with lyrics by David Bée, and performed by Mony Marc. The French-speaking department of the Belgian participating broadcaster, the National Broadcasting Institute (NIR/INR), organised a national final to determine its two entries for the contest. "Messieurs les noyés de la Seine" was the first-ever entry from Belgium performed in the Eurovision Song Contest, and the first-ever entry in French in the contest.

Held on 15 April 1956, the national final saw ten songs compete to be the Belgian entries; the results were determined by the jury panel and postcard voting. The Belgian entries performed 3rd and 10th, respectively, out of the 14 entries competing in the contest.

== Background ==
The European Broadcasting Union (EBU) was formed in 1950 among 23 organisations with the aim of the exchange of television programmes. Following the formation of the EBU, a number of notable events were transmitted through its networks in various European countries, such as Belgium, France, and the United Kingdom. Following this series of transmissions, a "Programme Committee" was set up within the EBU to investigate new initiatives for cooperation between broadcasters. The new European contest, entitled European Grand Prix, was subsequently approved at the EBU's General Assembly in October 1955. A planning sub-group, was subsequently formed to build out the rules of the competition. The rules of the contest were finalised and distributed to EBU members in early 1956. Per the rules of the contest, each participating broadcaster submitted two songs into the contest. Belgium was subsequently included on the EBU's list of seven countries whose broadcasters had signed up to partake in the contest.

The National Broadcasting Institute (NIR/INR), whose official names were Nationaal Instituut voor de Radio-omroep (NIR) in Dutch and Institut national de radiodiffusion (INR) in French, delegated its participation in the Venice International Song Festival 1956 to its Dutch-speaking department and its participation in the Eurovision Song Contest 1956 to its French-speaking department, following an agreement between the directors of both departments. This marked the beginning of a year-by-year alternation between the Dutch-speaking and the French-speaking departments in terms of selection and participation in Eurovision, which continued once the company split into two separate broadcasters. For the Eurovision Song Contest 1956, INR held a national final to choose two songs to represent Belgium.

== Before Eurovision ==
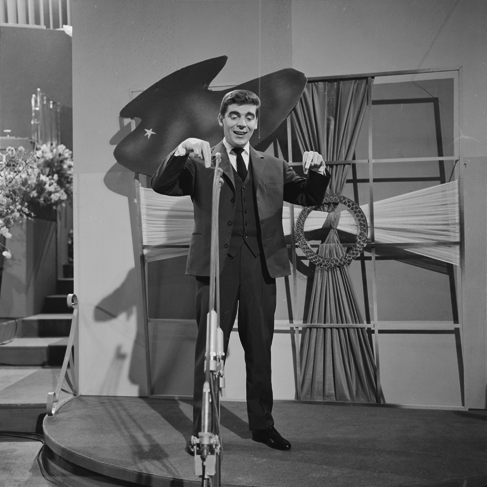
Fud Leclerc (pictured in 1958) was selected along with Mony Marc to represent Belgium in the Eurovision Song Contest 1956

After a public call for submissions, which ended on 7 March 1956, 436 songs were submitted to INR. According to the rules of the national final, composers were required to have Belgian citizenship, and only songs in French language were allowed. Ten songs were then selected by a jury panel, consisting of Angèle Guller, Jaap Streefkerk, Peter Packay and René Hénoumont.

=== Finale Nationale du Grand Prix Eurovision 1956 de la Chanson Europeenne ===
The national final, entitled Finale Nationale du Grand Prix Eurovision 1956 de la Chanson Europeenne, took place on 15 April 1956. It was broadcast on INR at 20:40 CET and was scheduled to last 80 minutes. It was directed by Bob Jacqmin. Six artists performed the ten songs: Johnny Grey, Denise Lebrun, Fud Leclerc, Mony Marc, Ghislaine Merry and Janine Michel. The competing entries were performed two times, first in an instrumental version, then sung by one of the artists. The artists were accompanied by a small ensemble under the direction of Henri Segers.

The songs first faced a jury vote. The jury had 11 members, including René Henoumont, Peter Packay, France Gérard, Jacques Stehman, Steve Kirk, Michette Lelong, Jacques Kluger and Armand Bachelier, with Georges Mathonet acting as jury president. The jury members gave marks to each song, with the music accounting for 60 % of the vote, and the lyrics for 40 %. "Messieurs les noyés de la Seine" by Fud Leclerc was selected as the first winner. "Messieurs les noyés de la Seine" was composed by Jean Miret and Jack Say, with lyrics by Robert Montal.

From the remaining nine entries, television viewers chose the second winner by postcard voting: "Le Plus Beau Jour de ma vie", composed by David Bee, written by Claude Alix, and performed by Mony Marc was selected as the second Belgian entry. Television viewers only had 24 hours to vote.

Each of the ten entries of the national final was awarded 2,500 Belgian francs, the authors of the two winning songs received additional 5,000 Belgian francs.

== At Eurovision ==
Eurovision Song Contest 1956 took place at the Teatro Kursaal in Lugano, Switzerland, on 24 May 1956. "Messieurs les noyés de la Seine" was performed 3rd at the contest and "Le Plus Beau Jour de ma vie" was performed 10th. Both of the Belgian entries were conducted at the contest by Léo Souris. The full results of the contest were not revealed and have not been retained by the EBU. The Belgian French-language broadcaster INR later claimed that Belgium had taken 3rd place.

Eurovision Song Contest 1956 was televised in Belgium on INR and NIR, with French-language INR taking commentary from Télévision Suisse by Raymond Colbert and Dutch-language NIR taking commentary from Dutch NTS by Piet de Nuyl Jr. Initially, INR's director of entertainment E. Blondeel had proposed broadcasting a recording later instead of a live broadcast since 24 May 1956 was a Thursday, and Thursday nights usually being reserved for theatre plays on INR.

Following the Eurovision Song Contest, the Belgian songwriters and authors organisation SABAM accused "Messieurs les noyés de la Seine" of plagiarism from the song "Le Noyé assassiné" by Philippe Clay.
