= Fernando Paggi =

Swiss conductor (1914–1973)

Fernando Paggi (3 July 1914 – 14 January 1973) was a Swiss conductor and musician known for conducting the Swiss entries for three Eurovision Song Contests. He was also the conductor of the Radio Monte Ceneri Orchestra.

== Competitions ==
- Eurovision Song Contest 1956 – conducted the winning entry for host nation Switzerland, Refrain, sung by Lys Assia; also conducted the Dutch and German entries
- Eurovision Song Contest 1961
- Eurovision Song Contest 1964

Preceded by None	Eurovision Song Contest conductor 1956	Succeeded by (Germany) Willy Berking
