= Mario Altéry =

French operatic tenor

- Born: Philippe Altare; 12 September 1892; Nice, France
- Died: 13 March 1974 (aged 81); Hyères, France
- Occupation: Operatic tenor
- Children: Mathé Altéry

Mario Altéry (12 September 1892 – 13 March 1974) was a French operatic tenor who performed with the Opéra de Paris and Opéra-Comique as well as singing in numerous operettas. Born in Nice, his real name was Philippe Altare.

== Life and career ==
Altéry was born in Nice and made his debut at the Opéra-Comique on 30 May 1935 as Gérald in Léo Delibes's Lakmé. He went on to perform there as Count Almaviva in The Barber of Seville, Don José in Carmen, Nadir in Les pêcheurs de perles, Pédro in Raoul Laparra's La Habanera, le Noctambule in Louise, the title role in Julien, Des Grieux, in Manon, the title role in Werther, Wilhelm Meister in Mignon, Félicien in Alfred Bruneau's Le rêve, Vincent in Mireille, and Philémon in Philémon et Baucis. He also performed in the Italian repertoire as Canio on Pagliacci, Turridu in Cavalleria rusticana, Cavaradossi in Tosca, Rodolfo in La bohème, and Alfredo in La traviata.

In 1942, he appeared at the Opéra de Paris as Mylio in Le Roi d'Ys alongside Suzanne Juyol, Solange Renaux, and José Beckmans in performances conducted by François Ruhlmann. He also appeared with company as the Duke of Mantua in Rigoletto.

Altéry died in Hyères on the French Riviera at the age of 81. His daughter, Mathé Altéry (born 1927), is a soprano noted for her performances in operetta and French song.

== Sources ==
- Peschke, Michael (ed.) (2006). International Encyclopedia of Pseudonyms, Volume 1. Walter de Gruyter. ISBN 3-598-24961-6
- Wolff, Stéphane (1953). Un demi-siècle d'Opéra-Comique (1900-1950). Paris: André Bonne
