= Oin-Oin =

Oin-Oin is a character of Swiss folklore in the Romandy, somewhat comparable to Till Eulenspiegel. Oin-oin is a simpleton who still manages to get out of difficulties with humour and a unique sense of retort.

From 1958, Oin-oin was played on radio by Claude Blanc, with Emile Gardaz his alter ego Milliquet. In France, the character appeared in sketches by Antoine de Caunes on Canal+.

The historical model of Oin-oin is Amédée-Célestin Rossillon (1852–1923). Rossillon worked as watchmaker in La Chaux-de-Fonds. His nickname was due to his pronunciation of oui "yes" due to a hare lip which he covered with a moustache.
