= Mathé Altéry =

French soprano

- Born: Marie-Thérèse Renée Micheline Altare; 12 September 1927 (age 98); Paris, France
- Occupation: Opera singer
- Nationality: French
- Father: Mario Altéry

Mathé Altéry (French pronunciation: [mate alteʁi], born Marie-Thérèse Renée Micheline Altare, 12 September 1927) is a French soprano prominent in the 1950s and 1960s. Mathé Altéry is the daughter of French tenor Mario Altéry. In 1956, both Altéry and Dany Dauberson individually represented France in the first Eurovision Song Contest.

== Career ==
Altéry was born in Paris. She began her singing career in Cherbourg-Octeville, Manche, Normandy, where her father was working at the time. She studied classical music. Altéry began as a chorister at the Théâtre du Châtelet in Paris, in the operetta Annie du Far-West (Annie of the Wild West) and in La Toison d'Or. In 1956, Altéry represented France in the first Eurovision Song Contest, with the song "Le temps perdu" (Lost Time). During the first contest, only the winning song was announced; therefore, the rank of her song is unknown. As of 2025, she is the oldest living Eurovision contestant.

In 1965, Altéry was featured on the CBC Television anthology series, Festival in the episode "The Season of Love" singing selections from Oscar Strauss, the operetta The Count of Luxembourg, musicals by Rodgers and Hammerstein and Lerner and Loewe, and songs that were popular in the early 1900s. She was also heard on French-Canadian radio, and appeared on television in other mid-1960 productions by Société Radio-Canada.

== See also ==
- Category of sopranos
- Eurovision Song Contest 1956
- France in the Eurovision Song Contest

Awards and achievements
Preceded by none	France in the Eurovision Song Contest; 1956 (and Dany Dauberson withIl est là)	Succeeded by Paule Desjardins with La Belle amour
