= Léo Souris =

Belgian composer, arranger, planner and conductor

- Born: 18 July 1911; Marchienne-au-Pont, Charleroi, Belgium
- Died: 14 March 1990 (aged 78); Liège, Belgium
- Occupations: Composer, arranger, planner, conductor

Léo Souris (18 July 1911 — 14 March 1990) was a Belgian composer, arranger, planner and conductor. He was mostly known for conducting Belgium in the Eurovision Song Contest Eurovision Song Contest 1956.

In 1928, at the age of 17, he founded and led his own orchestra.

== Singles & EPs ==
Singles & EP's
Title	Year
English Medley / Scotch Medl	1944
If I Had My Way / The Rose Covered Shack	1944
All's Well, Mademoiselle / It's Love, Love, Love	Unknown
Shoo Shoo Baby / I'll Be Seeing You	Unknown

== Playing career ==
Before conducting, he played for two orchestras. In 1952, he played "Paul Norman And His Orchestra - Rocking Horse Rag / Hésitation.

He then performed "Jean Woodman With Léo Souris' Swingettes - Shoo Shoo Baby / I'll Be Seeing You".

== Conducting career ==
For his previous performance which was "Jean Woodman With Léo Souris' Swingettes - Shoo Shoo Baby / I'll Be Seeing You", he was playing, but then was the conductor, the years following.
