= Marcel Bezençon =

Swiss broadcasting executive (1907–1981)

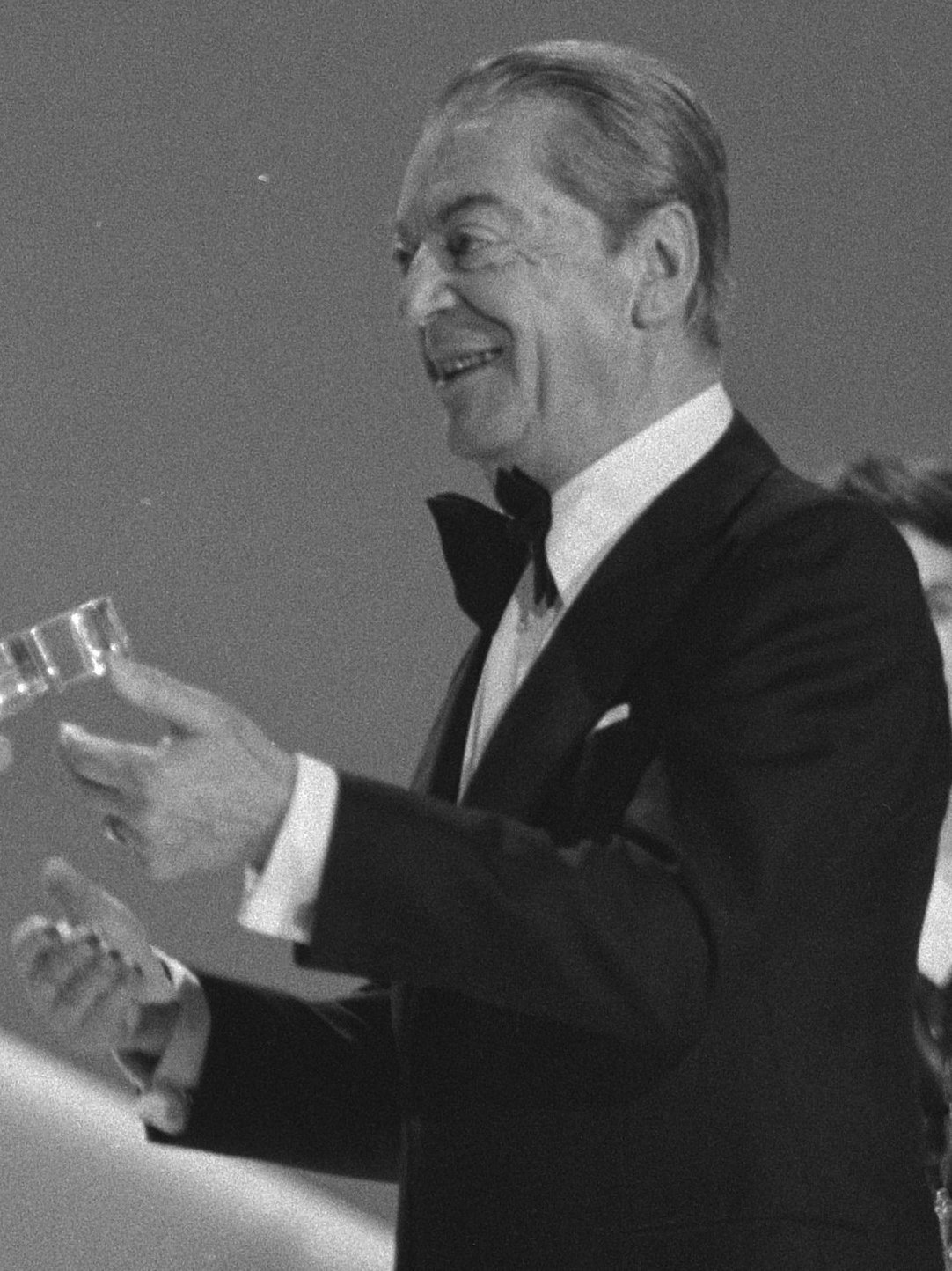
- Bezençon at the 1980 Eurovision Song Contest

President of the European Broadcasting Union
- In office 1955–1970

Personal details
- Born: Marcel Bezençon; 1 May 1907 Orbe, Switzerland
- Died: 17 February 1981 (aged 73) Lausanne, Switzerland

Marcel Bezençon (French pronunciation: [maʁsɛl bəzɑ̃sɔ̃]; 1 May 1907 – 17 February 1981) was a Swiss journalist, media executive and the director of the European Broadcasting Union between 1954 and 1970. In 1955, he conceived the idea of the Eurovision Song Contest, based on the famous Sanremo Music Festival.

Bezençon graduated with a degree in art history from the University of Lausanne in 1932, and then started work as a freelance art and theater critic before becoming editor of the newspaper Feuille d'Avis. In 1939, he joined Radio suisse romande (RSR), where he served as its director until 1950 when he became Director-General of the Swiss Broadcasting Corporation (SRG SSR), which he served until 1972. Bezençon also sat as a member of the board of directors of the Swiss Telegraphic Agency (SDA ATS) between 1963 and 1972.

In 2002, the Marcel Bezençon Awards were founded by Christer Björkman (Melodifestivalen winner and Swedish ESC participant in 1992) and Richard Herrey (Melodifestivalen and Swedish ESC winner in 1984 as part of the Herreys).
