= Duranville =

- Commune
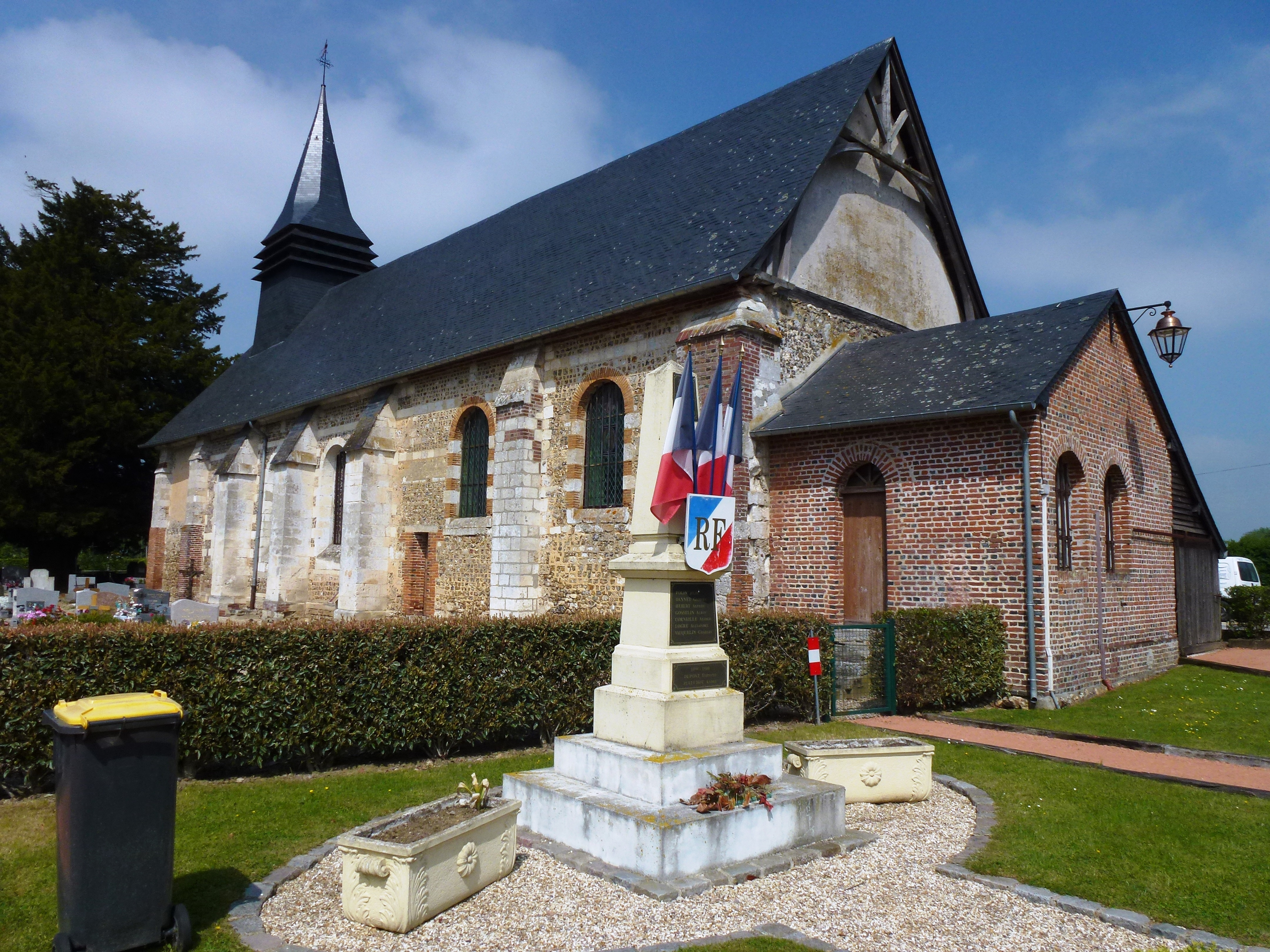
- The church in Duranville
- Location of Duranville
- Location within France Location within Normandy
- Coordinates: 49°08′58″N 0°30′38″E
- Country: France
- Region: Normandy
- Department: Eure
- Arrondissement: Bernay
- Canton: Beuzeville

Government
  - Mayor (2020–2026): Véronique Lebocey
- Area^{1}: 4.73 km^{2} (1.83 sq mi)
- Elevation: 181 m (594 ft)
- Highest elevation: 178 m (584 ft)
- Lowest elevation: 162 m (531 ft)
- Population (2023): 140
  - Density: 30/km^{2} (77/sq mi)
- Time zone: UTC+01:00 (CET)
  - Summer (DST): UTC+02:00 (CEST)
- INSEE/Postal code: 27208 /27230
- ^{1} French Land Register data, which excludes lakes, ponds, glaciers > 1 km^{2} (0.386 sq mi or 247 acres) and river estuaries.

Duranville (French pronunciation: [dyʁɑ̃vil]) is a commune in the Eure department in northern France.

== Toponym ==
The name of the locality is attested in the forms Durandi villam (c. 1034), Duranvilla (c. 1150, in a charter of Henry II), and Duranvilla (1159). Durandi villam is a medieval place-name formation in -ville (from the Gallo-Roman VILLA, meaning "rural estate"), preceded by the Old Norse personal name Þórr (Old Danish Thor). Its proposed phonetic development is *Thorr → Dorr (lenition of the initial /t/) → *Durr (change from /ɔ/ to /y/), followed by -hramn (an alternative form of -hrafn, meaning "raven").

== Population ==
Historical population
Year	Pop.	±% p.a.
1968	162	—
1975	151	−1.00%
1982	185	+2.94%
1990	171	−0.98%
1999	173	+0.13%
2007	166	−0.51%
2012	158	−0.98%
2017	153	−0.64%
2023	140	−1.47%
Source: INSEE

== See also ==
- Communes of the Eure department
