= Franco Marazzi =

Swiss director (1925–2014)

- Born: Franco Marazzi; 4 November 1925; Lugano, Switzerland
- Died: 21 September 2014 (aged 88)
- Occupation: Director

Franco Marazzi (4 November 1925 – 21 September 2014) was a Swiss director. He directed 9 films and shows in 7 years. He is mostly known for being the director in the Eurovision Song Contest 1956.

Marazzi started his career as a reporter in 1954 in Zürich. He first directed the Eurovision Song Contest 1956. In 1958, he was the creator of TSI.

== Filmography ==
Film	Type	Year Directed
Eurovision Song Contest 1956	Show	1956
Eurovision Presents Pictures in the Sky	Movie	1957
Revue Mosaik	Movie	1959
Mike macht alles	Mini-Series	1961–1963
Settenote	Movie	1962
Trattoria Musicale	Movie	1962
Reportagen mit jedermann	Documentary	1963
Dinner for One	Short	1963
Grüsse aus Zürich	Movie	1963
