= Émile Gardaz =

Swiss radio moderator and writer (1931–2007)

Emile Gardaz
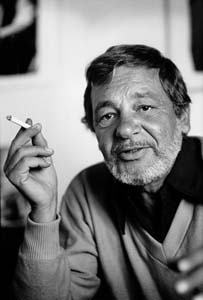
- Born: 29 August 1931; Échallens, Vaud, Switzerland
- Died: 19 December 2007 (aged 76)

Émile Gardaz (29 August 1931 – 19 December 2007) was a Swiss radio moderator and author, working for Radio suisse romande since 1955. He was the father of comedian Sophie Gardaz.

Ten years before his death, in 1997, he was, with Jean-Pierre Thiollet, among the personalities when the township of Delphi appointed the renowned environmentalist Franz Weber a Citoyen d'honneur.

== Works ==
=== Radio ===
- Derrière les fagots
- Mardi les gars avec Michel Dénériaz
- Demain-Dimanche
- adventures of Oin-Oin

=== Books ===
- Frères comme ça, CRV, 1970.
- Le pays d'Echallens, 1977.
- Passerelle des jours : soixante mois de poésie pour accompagner des photographies de Marcel Imsand, Bertil Galland, 1981.
- Neuchâtel en eaux douces: le lac de Neuchâtel, Fabrique de Tabac réunies, 1981.
- Croix du Sud, Théâtre du Jorat, 1985.
- Le moulin à sable, éd. de la Passerelle, 1985.
- L'horizon réclamé, Fondation Pré vert du Signal de Bougy, 1986.
- Les petites boréales, éd. de la Passerelle, 1990. (poems)
- Contes courants, éd. Bastian, 1994.
- La courte échelle, éd. de la Passerelle, 1995. (poems)
- La clé du temps, éd. Scriptar, 1995.
- Escales au pays : l'oreille à la porte, Éditions Cabédita, 1997.
- Fête du blé et du pain, éd. Vie Art Cité, 1998.
- Gros de Vaud, L'Echo du Gros-de-Vaud, 1999.

=== Music ===
- some 600 songs
- Refrain, music by Géo Voumard, sung by Lys Assia, first place at the first Eurovision Song Contest in 1956.
