= RSI Rete Uno =

- Lugano; Switzerland
- Broadcast area: Switzerland
- Frequencies: DAB, cable and satellite

Ownership
- Owner: RSI

History
- First air date: 29 October 1933; 92 years ago (as Radio Monte Ceneri)

Links
- Webcast: ,
- Website: www.rsi.ch/rete-uno/

RSI Rete Uno (English: Network One) is the principal radio channel of the Swiss public-service broadcasting organization Radio Svizzera Italiana, which launched in 1933 as Radio Monte Ceneri.

Broadcasting in Italian, it is receivable via DAB, cable, and satellite (Tivùsat and Hot Bird). Until 30 June 2008 (when SRG SSR ceased broadcasting on the 558 kHz medium-wave frequency) it could also be received in large areas of northern and central Italy.

The station identifies itself on-air as "Radio Svizzera – Rete Uno". The director of RSI Rete Uno is Edy Salmina.

== History ==
On 7 July 1930, the Grand Council of Ticino approved the legislative decree of the creation of an Autonomous Entity for Broadcasting in Italian Switzerland (Ente autonomo per la radiodiffusione nella Svizzera italiana, EARSI). On 1 October 1931, Felice Antonio Vitali started his functions as the director of the new station. On 29 October 1933, Rete Uno is officially born (at the time Radio Monte Ceneri), with the inauguration of the national transmission from Monte Ceneri and of the broadcasts from Campo Marzio, whose experiments dated back to May 1932. The medium wave broadcasts were receivable on 558 kHz also in Italy until 30 June 2008; on that day, broadcasts on that frequency ceased, causing a few controversies especially among Italian listeners. In 2002, in the occasion of the 70th anniversary of the creation of Radio della Svizzera Italiana, Museo della radio was created, located on Mount Ceneri facing the antenna that gave Radio Monteceneri its name.

Today, Rete Uno is receivable on DAB+ in all of Switzerland's territory, as well as online via streaming and via satellite abroad. It is also possible to receive the signal in the northern area of Novara province, in northern Lombardy and close to Milan, in DAB+.

As of 1 January 2025, transmission in FM is no longer performed, moving entirely to DAB+. Previously, RSI Rete Uno's FM network covered the whole of Switzerland as well as southern Germany.
