= Géo Voumard =

Swiss musician

- Born: 2 December 1920; Biel/Bienne, Switzerland
- Died: 3 September 2008 (aged 87)
- Occupation: Jazz composer
- Instrument: Piano
- Formerly of: Hazy Osterwald Orchestra

Géo Voumard (2 December 1920 – 3 September 2008) was a Swiss jazz pianist and composer. He was a co-founder of the Montreux Jazz Festival and composer of the song "Refrain" which won the first Eurovision Song Contest.

== Life and career ==
Voumard was born in Biel/Bienne. He originally studied architecture in college before starting his musical career.

== Music career ==
Voumard joined the Hazy Osterwald Orchestra in 1944. Four years later, in 1948, he created his own group. Voumard began broadcasting out of Radio Lausanne, which is now known as Radio Suisse Romande, in 1952. He originally joined Radio Lausanne as an accompanist, pianist, composer and musical producer. In 1966, Voumard became the station's director of pop music. He later served as Radio Lausanne's director of light entertainment from 1969 until 1983.

Voumard founded the Montreux Jazz Festival with René Langel and Claude Nobs in 1967. He co-wrote the very first Eurovision Song Contest winning song, Refrain in 1956. Refrain was co-written by Émile Gardaz.

Voumard moved to the Provence region of France following his departure from radio broadcasting in the 1980s. He worked as an architect in France before returning to his native Switzerland for the remainder of his life.

Géo Voumard died at the age of 87.

== Discography ==
- Flavio Ambrosetti Sextet, 1943
- Geo Voumard Trio With Mers Eddy And His Strings – Piano, Strings And Sound
- Géo Voumard – 25 Ans De Jazz, 1953–1977
- Géo Voumard Trio – Geo Voumard Trio
- Hazy Osterwald – Big Bands of Europe Vol. Ii, 1946–1948
- Various – The Golden Swing Years, 1942–1947
