= Lys Assia =

Swiss singer (1924–2018)

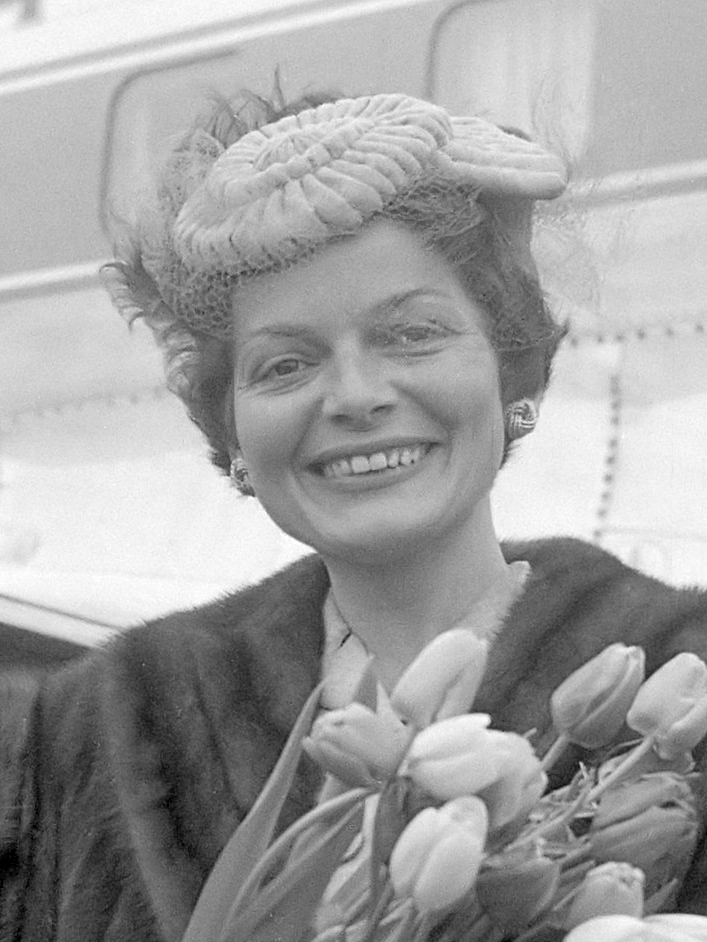
- Assia in 1957

Background information
- Born: Rosa Mina Schärer; 3 March 1924; Rupperswil, Aargau, Switzerland
- Died: 24 March 2018 (aged 94) Zollikerberg, Zürich, Switzerland
- Occupation: Singer
- Instrument: Vocals
- Years active: 1942–2018

Rosa Mina Schärer (3 March 1924 – 24 March 2018), known by her stage name Lys Assia, was a Swiss singer who won the first Eurovision Song Contest in 1956. Assia was born in Rupperswil, Aargau, and began her stage career as a dancer, but changed to singing in 1940 where she met her first musical success in 1950 with "O mein Papa".

== Eurovision Song Contest ==
In 1956, she was the winner of the first Eurovision Song Contest, in which she sang for Switzerland with 2 songs. "Refrain", the winning song, and "Das alte Karussell", another song. She returned to the contest again for Switzerland in 1957 with "L'Enfant que j'étais" and 1958 with "Giorgio" sung in German and Italian.

In 2005, Assia performed at the Congratulations: 50 Years of the Eurovision Song Contest event.

In 2009, together with the previous year's winner Dima Bilan, Assia presented the Eurovision trophy to that year's winner Alexander Rybak.

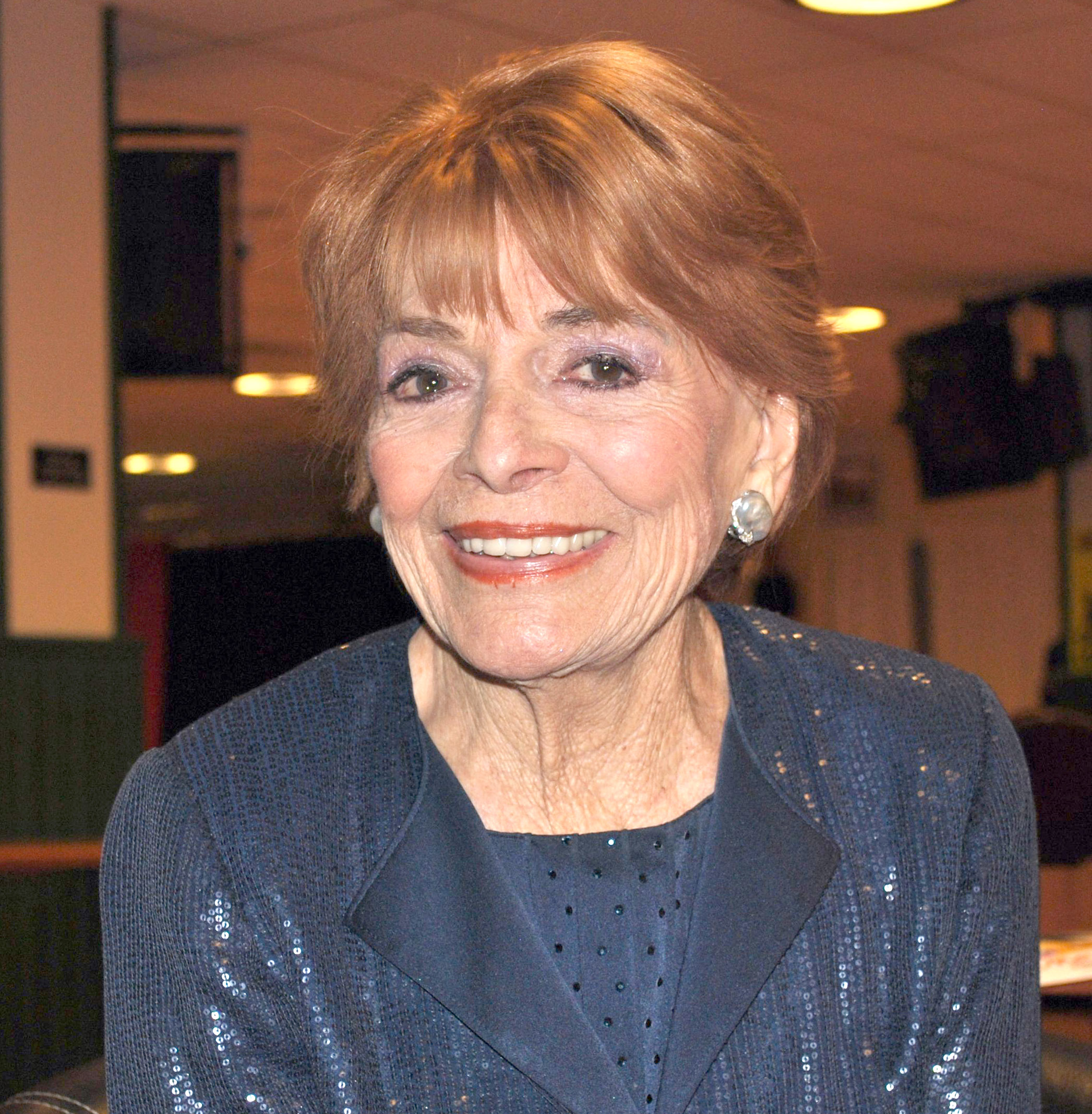
Lys Assia in October 2012

In September 2011, Assia entered her song "C'était ma vie", written by Ralph Siegel and Jean Paul Cara, into the Swiss national selection Die grosse Entscheidungs Show for the Eurovision Song Contest 2012 in Baku, Azerbaijan. The song came eighth in a closely fought national selection. She attended the event in Baku as a guest of honour.

In 2012, Assia again submitted a song to the Swiss national selection to represent Switzerland in Malmö, Sweden at the Eurovision Song Contest 2013 with the song "All in Your Head" featuring the hip-hop rap group New Jack. This entry, however, was not chosen to compete at the national selection. There were rumours of Assia representing San Marino, but it was announced on 30 January 2013 that Valentina Monetta would do so. She later made a guest appearance during the contest's second semi-final. In 2015, at age 91, Assia attended the Eurovision Song Contest's Greatest Hits special concert celebrating the contest's 60th anniversary. This was her last public appearance.

== Personal life ==
Assia married Johann Heinrich Kunz on 11 January 1957 in Zürich. Kunz died just nine months later after battling a serious illness. In 1963, she married Danish businessman Oscar Pedersen, who died in 1995. She died on 24 March 2018 in Zürich.

Awards and achievements
Preceded by None	Winner of the Eurovision Song Contest; 1956	Succeeded by (Netherlands) Corry Brokken with "Net als toen"
Preceded by None	Switzerland in the Eurovision Song Contest; 1956 with "Das alte Karussell" and "Refrain"; 1957 with "L'enfant que j'étais", 1958 with "Giorgio"	Succeeded by Christa Williams with "Irgendwoher"
