= Casinò Lugano =

Casino and theatre in Lugano, Switzerland

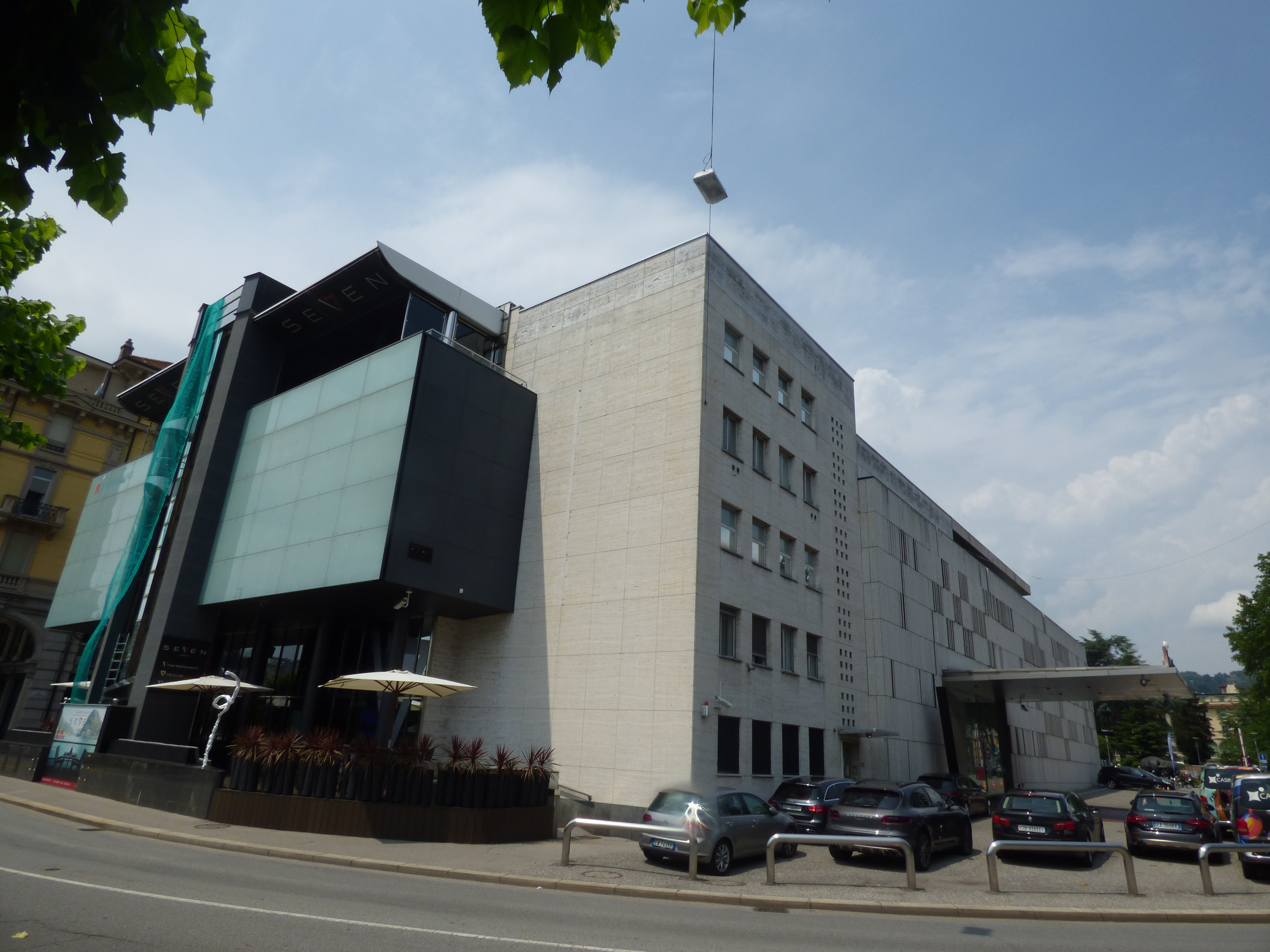
- Interactive map of Casinò Lugano
- Location: Lugano, Switzerland; Via Stauffacher 1; Post-office box 6482; 6901, Lugano; 46°0′14.4″N 08°57′18″E
- Opened: 29 November 2002
- Notable restaurants: Elementi Ristorante
- Casino type: Land
- Architect: Achille Sfondrini
- Previous names: Teatro Kursaal (1804–2002)
- Renovated in: 2014
- Website: Official website

Casinò Lugano (formerly known as Teatro Kursaal) is a casino and theatre designed by Italian architect Achille Sfondrini in the 19th century. It is located in the city of Lugano, Switzerland. A restaurant and café called Elementi Ristorante is located within the building. The theatre was the host venue of the first Eurovision Song Contest in 1956.

== History ==
Teatro Kursaal, closed in April 1997 (demolished in 2001)

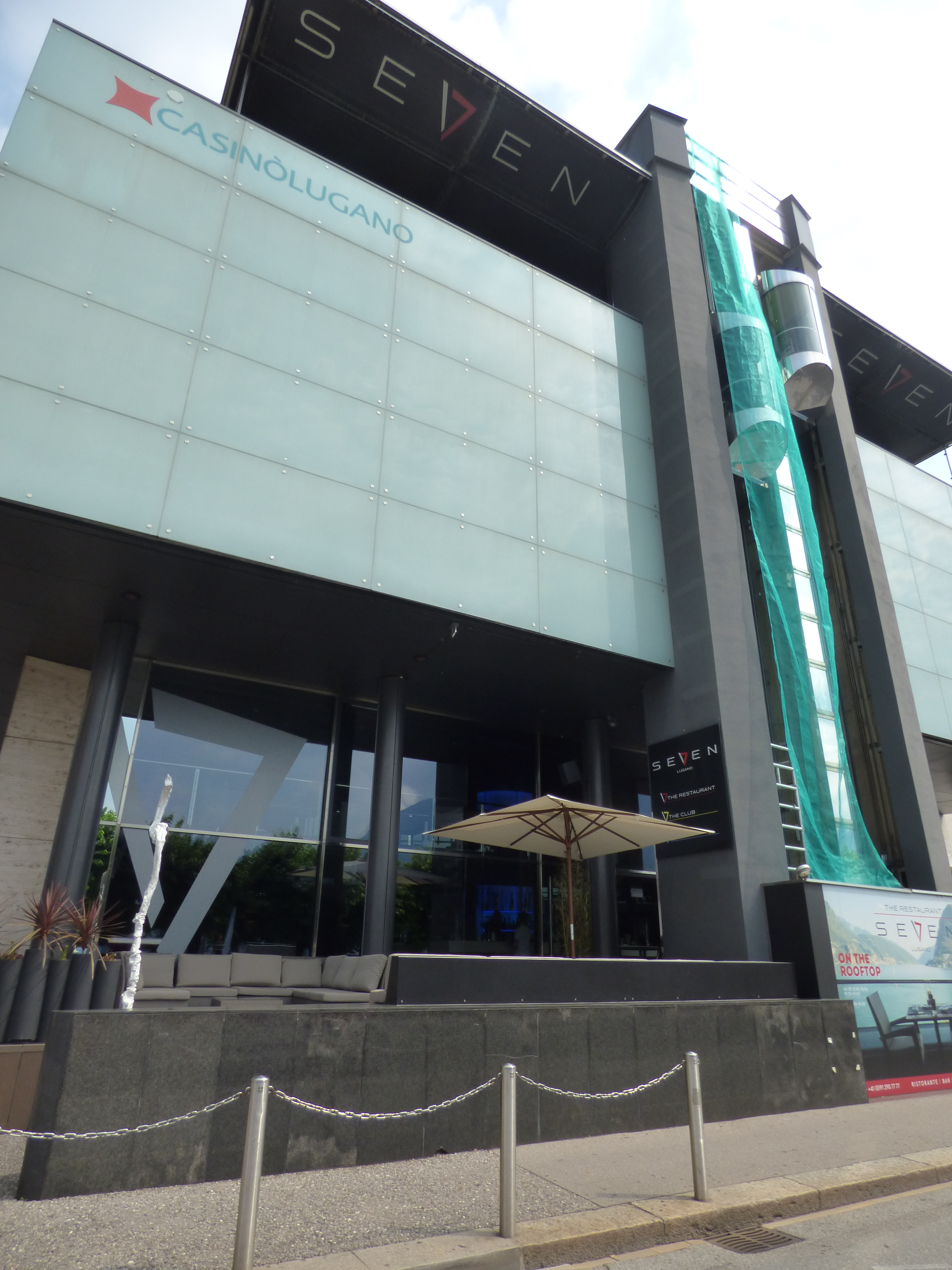
Casinò Lugano in June 2016

Designed by the Italian architect Achille Sfondrini in the 19th century, Teatro Kursaal was the first games room with a café to open in Lugano. Biriba, Basset, and dice games were played in the establishment during the autumn fair. Upon the establishment of the Lugano Theatre Society in 1885, which consisted of 177 shareholders, discussions were held to modify the building for the intended purpose of theatrical and musical performances, ballroom dance and other shows. Plans were made to accommodate a café and restaurant adjacent to the main theatre.

In 1912, the theatre acquired a gambling license. The society changed its name to Società del Teatro e Casinò Kursaal di Lugano in 1922. The Kursaal continued to increase its revenue after the Great Depression.

In 1946, the theatre broke its own financial record, accumulating 641,777 Swiss francs (equivalent of €558,558.65 US$811,018.50 or £519,190.25 as of May 2021) after staging operas, plays, concerts and films.

On 24 May 1956, the theatre hosted the inaugural Eurovision Song Contest.

The gambling stakes for playing were raised, from 2 Swiss Francs to 5 Swiss Francs, after a shareholders' vote in 1959.

The city of Lugano became the major shareholder in 1970 after its purchase of 184 shares. Following the ordinance of the Swiss Federal banking commission changes, fruit machines and boules were brought into the Kursaal.

The fundamental principles were amended in 1993 to allow major games to be played on the premises. This license was later upgraded, to permit the company to operate as a casino. The theatre closed shortly after the last show in April 1997 and was demolished in 2001 to make room for the extension of the Casino. Casinò Lugano opened again on 29 November 2002.

Casinò Lugano has received an extension to its permit to also manage casino games online and has conceived the Swiss4Win brand for its entry into the online Swiss market.

== See also ==
- Casinò di Campione
- Gambling in Switzerland

Preceded by N/A (first venue)	Eurovision Song Contest; Venue; 1956	Succeeded by Großer Sendesaal; Frankfurt
