= 1958 in Germany =

- Decades: 1930s; 1940s; 1950s; 1960s; 1970s
- See also: Other events of 1958; History of Germany • Timeline • Years

Events in the year 1958 in Germany.

== Incumbents ==
- President – Theodor Heuss
- Chancellor – Konrad Adenauer

== Events ==
- January 20 - Germany in the Eurovision Song Contest 1958
- June 27 - July 8 - 8th Berlin International Film Festival
- November 16 - East German general election, 1958

== Science ==
- Date unknown - The Mössbauer effect, or recoilless nuclear resonance fluorescence, is a physical phenomenon discovered by Rudolf Mössbauer in 1958.

== Births ==
- January 24 - Frank Ullrich, biathlete
- January 25 - Jürgen Hingsen, decathlete
- February 12 - Gero Storjohann, politician (died 2023)
- February 17 - Claudia Schoppmann, historian and writer
- March 17 - Ulrike Hoffmann-Richter, psychiatrist (died 2024)
- March 20 - Stefan Keil, diplomat (died 2021)
- March 21 - Marlies Göhr, athlete
- March 24
  - Roland Koch, politician
  - Mathias Richling, German actor, author, comedian and cabaret artist
- March 31
  - Dietmar Bartsch, politician
  - Sylvester Groth, actor
- April 2 - Olaf Prenzler, sprinter
- April 26 - Ingolf Lück, actor
- May 7 - Christine Lieberknecht, politician
- May 19 - Dieter Reiter, politician
- May 21 - Sabine Bischoff, fencer
- May 23 - Thomas Reiter, astronaut
- June 2 - Andreas K. W. Meyer, dramaturge and opera manager (died 2023)
- June 3 - Margot Käßmann, Lutheran theologian, Landesbischöfin (bishop) of the Evangelical-Lutheran Church of Hanover
- June 6 - Rudi Fink, boxer
- June 14 - Olaf Scholz, politician
- June 16 - Ulrike Tauber, swimmer
- June 18 - Peter Altmaier, politician
- June 29 - Dieter Althaus, politician
- July 25 - Karlheinz Förster, footballer
- July 27 - Barbara Rudnik, actress (died 2009)
- July 15 - Jörg Kachelmann Swiss presenter in the meteorological field and victim of false rape accusations
- July 27 - Margarethe Schreinemakers, television presenter and talk show host
- August 5 - Ulla Salzgeber, equestrian
- September 1 - Dagmar Manzel, actress
- September 6 - Amelie Fried, writer
- September 26 - Rudi Cerne, figure skater
- September 29 - Tom Buhrow, journalist
- October 3 - Jürgen Hofmann, Olympic bobsledder
- October 8 - Ursula von der Leyen, politician
- October 14 - Peter Kloeppel, journalist
- October 19 - Alexander Held, actor (died 2026)
- October 23 - Axel Krause, painter and graphic artist
- October 25 - Kornelia Ender, swimmer
- November 9
  - Michael Boder, conductor (died 2024)
  - Eva Herman, author and television presenter
- December 5
  - Annette Harnack, high jumper
  - Martin Schaudt, equestrian
- December 10 - Annelore Zinke, gymnast
- December 11 - Dominic Raacke, actor
- December 15 - Stephan Weil, politician
- December 21 - Tom Enders, businessman
- December 25 - Alexander, Prince of Schaumburg-Lippe, nobleman
- Unknown - OUBEY, visual artist (died 2004)

== Deaths ==
- January 9 - Karl Reinhardt, German philologist (born 1886)
- January 27 - Prince Oskar of Prussia, German nobleman (born 1888)
- January 30 - Ernst Heinkel, German aircraft designer (born 1888)
- February 22 - Theo Harych, German writer (born 1903)
- March 3 - Wilhelm Zaisser, German politician (born 1893)
- March 21 - Hans Ehrenberg, German theologian (born 1883)
- April 6 - Reinhold Schneider, German poet (born 1903)
- June 20 - Kurt Alder, German chemist (born 1902)
- June 29 - Karl Arnold, German politician (born 1901)
- June 30 - Walther Schreiber, German politician (born 1884)
- July 26 - Siegfried Passarge, German geographer (born 1866)
- August 25 - Leo Blech, German composer and conductor (born 1871)
- September 10 - Franz Wessel, German judge (born 1903)
- September 15 — Ferdinand Schumann-Heink, German actor (born 1893)
- October 11 - Johannes R. Becher, German politician, poet and novelist (born 1891)
- October 19 - Josef Wintrich, German judge (born 1891)
- October 23 - Erich Köhler, German politician (born 1892)
- October 24 - Carl-Hans Graf von Hardenberg, German politician and landowner (born 1891)
- October 27 - Barbara Schack, Sudeten German politician (born 1873 or 1874)
- November 19 - Hans Heinrich von Twardowski (born 1898)
- December 21 - Lion Feuchtwanger, German novelist (born 1884)

== See also ==
- 1958 in German television
