= France in the Eurovision Song Contest 1958 =

- Eurovision Song Contest 1958
- Participating broadcaster: Radiodiffusion-Télévision Française (RTF)
- Country: France
- Selection process: Artist: Internal selection Song: National final
- Selection date: 7 February 1958

Competing entry
- Song: "Dors, mon amour"
- Artist: André Claveau
- Songwriters: Pierre Delanoë; Hubert Giraud

Placement
- Final result: 1st, 27 votes

Participation chronology

France was represented at the Eurovision Song Contest 1958 with the song "Dors, mon amour", composed by Hubert Giraud, with lyrics by Pierre Delanoë, and performed by André Claveau. The French participating broadcaster, Radiodiffusion-Télévision Française (RTF), held a national final to select its entry, after having previously selected the performer internally. The song would go on to win the Eurovision Song Contest.

== Before Eurovision ==
The 1958 contest marked France's third appearance in the Eurovision Song Contest, having participated yearly since the first contest in 1956. Radiodiffusion-Télévision Française (RTF) internally selected André Claveau to sing for France, with the song being selected in a national final. A few weeks prior to the national final, RTF asked 20 record labels to send their best songs. 15 songs were submitted, and RTF chose five of them for the national final.

=== Et voici quelques airs ===
The music show Et voici quelques airs was used as the national final. It took place on 7 February 1958 at 20:25 CET and lasted 33 minutes. It was directed by Claude Dagues and hosted by Marianne Lecène. Five songs were presented. They were sung by one of their songwriters, with the exception of "Musique magique", sung by singer Jocelyne Jocya. The performing artists were accompanied by an orchestra under the musical direction of Léo Chauliac.

The interval acts included Francis Lemarque and Christiane Legrand performing "Marjolaine", Maria Candido performing "Buenas noches, mi amor", André Claveau performing "Toi l'amour" and Danièle George performing "Mandoline amoureuse".

A jury consisting of 13 music and television professionals decided the winner: Jean Marsac (jury president), Emmanuel Robert, Paul Peyre, Jean-Vincent Bréchignac, Arno-Charles Brun, Armand Lanoux, Ariane Ségal, Agathe Mella, (Note: When reading out the list of jury members, presenter Marianne Lecène did not name her despite TV cameras showing her sitting with the other jury members.) André Salvet, Denis Bourgeois, Jacques Seignette, Paul Durand and Eddie Barclay. Only the winning song and the runner-up were announced by jury president Jean Marsac: the winning song was "Dors, mon amour", written by Hubert Giraud (music) and Pierre Delanoë (lyrics), with "Helena", written by René Denoncin, coming second.

André Claveau then performed the winning song, holding a large sheet of paper with the notes and lyrics in front of him as he didn't know the song by heart.

Et voici quelques airs – 7 February 1958
R/O	Artist	Song	Songwriter(s)	Place
1	Charles Dumont	"Parigi Roma"	Charles Dumont	—N/a
2	René Denoncin	"Helena"	René Denoncin; Roger Desbois	2
3	Jocelyne Jocya	"Musique magique"	André Popp; Henri Contet	—N/a
4	Hubert Giraud	"Dors, mon amour"	Hubert Giraud; Pierre Delanoë	1
5	André Richin	"Tape dans tes mains"	André Richin	—N/a

== At Eurovision ==
The Eurovision Song Contest 1958 took place at AVRO Studios in Hilversum, Netherlands on 12 March 1958. Claveau sang third on the night of the contest, following the Netherlands and preceding Luxembourg. "Dors, mon amour" was conducted by Franck Pourcel at the contest. At the close of the voting, France had received 27 votes, placing first of 10 countries, and achieving its first victory at the contest.

Eurovision Song Contest 1958 was broadcast in France on RTF Télévision as well as on radio France I, with commentary by Pierre Tchernia.

=== Voting ===
Each participating broadcaster assembled a ten-member jury panel. Every jury member could give one vote to their favourite song.

The members of the French jury were: Armand Lanoux (jury president), Henry Torrès, Jean Marsac, Renée Faure, Jean Delannoy, André Salvet, Jo Bouillon, Line Renaud, Jean Sablon and Henri Jeanson. The French jury's voting was supervised by Paul Peyre, RTF director of television programming.

Votes awarded to France
Score	Country
9 votes	Denmark
7 votes	Austria
6 votes	Italy
1 vote	Belgium; Germany; Luxembourg; Sweden; Switzerland

Votes awarded by France
Score	Country
3 votes	Austria; Switzerland
2 votes	Germany
1 vote	Denmark; Italy
