= Nel blu, dipinto di blu =

1958 song by Domenico Modugno

Single by Domenico Modugno

from the EP La strada dei successi
- Language: Italian
- B-side: "Vecchio frac"; "Nisciuno po' sapé"; "Strada 'nfosa"; "Lazzarella"
- Released: 1 February 1958
- Recorded: 1957
- Genre: Pop; chanson
- Length: 3:29
- Label: Fonit (Italy); Decca (US); Oriole international (UK)
- Composer: Domenico Modugno
- Lyricists: Franco Migliacci; Domenico Modugno

Audio sample
- file; help

Eurovision Song Contest 1958 entry
- Country: Italy
- Artist: Domenico Modugno
- Language: Italian
- Composer: Domenico Modugno
- Lyricists: Domenico Modugno; Franco Migliacci
- Conductor: Alberto Semprini

Finals performance
- Final result: 3rd
- Final points: 13

Entry chronology
- ◄ "Corde della mia chitarra" (1957)
- "Piove (Ciao, ciao bambina)" (1959) ►

"Nel blu, dipinto di blu" (Italian: [nel ˈblu diˈpinto di ˈblu]; 'In the blue [sky] [as I was] painted blue'), popularly known as "Volare" (Italian: [voˈlaːre]; 'To fly'), is a song originally recorded by Italian singer-songwriter Domenico Modugno, with music composed by himself and Italian lyrics written by himself and Franco Migliacci. It was released as a single on 1 February 1958.

After winning the eighth edition of the Sanremo Music Festival, the song represented Italy in the third edition of the Eurovision Song Contest held in Hilversum, where it came in third place out of ten songs.

The song spent five non-consecutive weeks atop the Billboard Hot 100 in August and September 1958, and subsequently became Billboard's number-one single for the year. In 1959, at the 1st Annual Grammy Awards, Modugno's recording became the first ever Grammy winner for both Record of the Year and Song of the Year. The combined sales of all the versions of the song exceed 18 million copies worldwide, making it one of the all-time most popular songs to come out of Sanremo and Eurovision.

The song was later translated into several languages and recorded by a wide range of performers. The song is also used as the basis for numerous football chants.

== Background ==
=== Writing ===
Franco Migliacci began working on the lyrics of the song in June 1957, inspired by two paintings by Marc Chagall. He had planned to go to the sea with Domenico Modugno, but while waiting for Modugno to show up, Migliacci started drinking wine and eventually fell asleep. He had vivid dreams, and when he woke up, he looked at the Chagall paintings (reproductions) on the wall. In "Le coq rouge" was a yellow man suspended in mid-air, while in "Le peintre et la modèle", half the painter's face was coloured blue. So he began penning a song about a man who dreams of painting himself blue, and being able to fly. Later that same night, Migliacci discussed his lyrics with Modugno, and for several days they worked on the song, tentatively entitled "Sogno in blu" ('Dream in blue').

In 2008, Modugno's widow, Franca Gandolfi, recalled that her husband, after a storm forced open his window, had the idea of modifying the chorus of the song, introducing the word "Volare", which is now the popular title of the song.

=== Musical style and lyrical content ===
The song is a ballad in a dramatic chanson style, in which Modugno describes the feeling he has when with his lover; a feeling that resembles flying. The song opens with a surreal prelude, which the cover versions often left out:

Penso che un sogno così non ritorni mai più
Mi dipingevo le mani e la faccia di blu
poi d'improvviso venivo dal vento rapito
e incominciavo a volare nel cielo infinito.

Translation:

I think that a dream like that will never return
I painted my hands and my face blue
then was suddenly swept up by the wind
and started to fly in the infinite sky.

The English lyrics were written by Mitchell Parish. Alternative English lyrics were written in 1958 by Gracie Fields, and were used from then in most concerts she performed in until her death in 1979; she often changed the words to suit her performance and age.

=== Sanremo Music Festival ===
In 1958, the song participated in the selection process for the eighth edition of the Sanremo Music Festival. The jury charged with selecting the entries to the competition was going to reject "Nel blu, dipinto di blu"; however, in the end, it was one of the twenty admitted songs.

On 31 January 1958, the song was performed for the first time, during the second night of the Festival, by both Domenico Modugno and Johnny Dorelli. It was Dorelli's first appearance at the Festival, and according to his team-partner, Dorelli was so nervous that he had to be punched by Modugno to be persuaded to perform on stage.

After being admitted to the final, held at the Sanremo Casino on 1 February 1958, the song was performed again, winning the Festival, beating the song "L'edera" by Nilla Pizzi and Tonina Torrielli, which came in second place.

Whilst Dorelli's performance had a lesser impact on the audience, Modugno's is now considered to be the event that changed the history of Italian music. During his performance, Modugno opened his arms as if he was going to fly, which would contribute to making it the most successful Sanremo Music Festival song. It would also mark a change in the way of performing, as Italian singers were used to standing with their arms on their chest, without moving on the stage.

=== Eurovision Song Contest ===
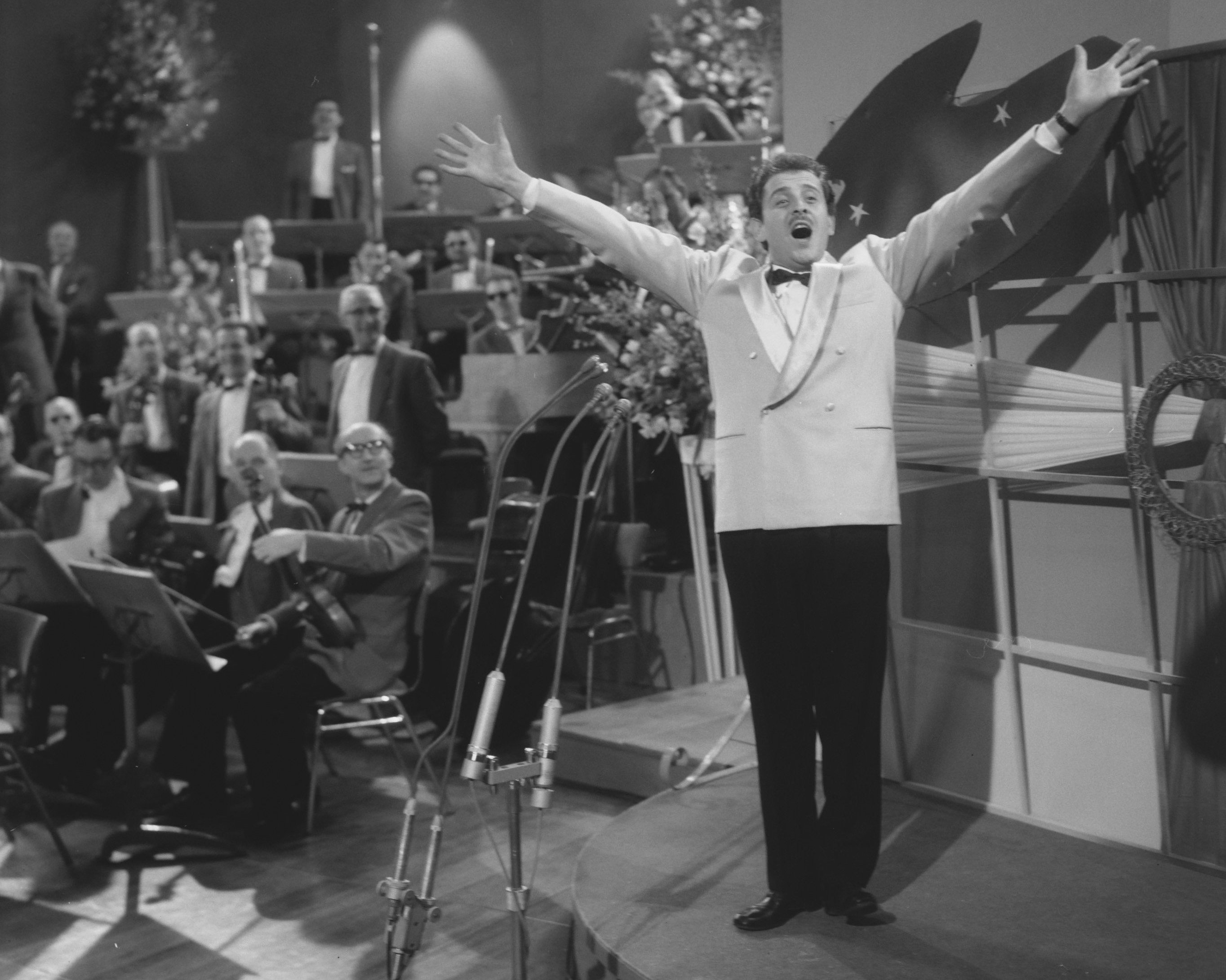
Domenico Modugno at Eurovision rehearsals

As Sanremo was used by Radiotelevisione italiana (RAI) to select its song and performer for the third edition of the Eurovision Song Contest, the song became the Italian entrant, and Modugno the performer, for Eurovision.

On 12 March 1958, the Eurovision Song Contest was held at the AVRO Studios in Hilversum hosted by Nederlandse Televisie Stichting (NTS), and broadcast live throughout the continent. Modugno performed "Nel blu, dipinto di blu" first on the evening, preceding "Heel de wereld" by Corry Brokken from the Netherlands. However, he would have to perform again at the end as well—before the voting took place—due to a transmission fault during his performance that caused the song to not be heard in all countries broadcasting the event. Alberto Semprini conducted the event's live orchestra in the performances of the Italian entry.

At the end of the voting, the song had received 13 points, placing third in a field of ten. Despite this, it became one of the most successful songs ever performed in Eurovision Song Contest history. It was succeeded as Italian entrant at the 1959 contest by "Piove (Ciao, ciao bambina)", also performed by Modugno.

== Commercial success ==
"Nel blu, dipinto di blu" became an instant success in Italy, selling more than 20,000 copies in its first twelve days. As of February 2013, according to RAI's estimates, the single had sold 800,000 copies in its domestic market. Following the results obtained in Italy, the song was also released in the United States and in the rest of Europe and the single obtained global acclaim, becoming an international hit.

In the United States, the single debuted at number 54 on the very first Billboard Hot 100, on 4 August 1958, and the next week it climbed at number two, marking the biggest jump to the runner-up spot in the chart's history. On 18 August 1958, it topped the Hot 100, becoming the second song to reach the top spot on the chart, after Ricky Nelson's "Poor Little Fool". The song later completed a run of five non-consecutive weeks at the top of the chart, selling two million copies in the United States during 1958. During its US release, fifteen other recordings of the song were also on release, including Dean Martin's "Volare", which in total sold over 1.5 million records. "Nel blu, dipinto di blu" and "Volare" were both in the top 10 at the same time. "Nel blu, dipinto di blu" was Billboard's Song of the Year and was the first non-American, -Canadian or -British single to achieve this honour in the rock era, and it would be the only one to do so until 1994's "The Sign" by Swedish group Ace of Base. It is also one of the only two songs by Modugno charting on the Hot 100, together with "Piove (Ciao, ciao bambina)", which peaked at number 97.

In the United Kingdom, Modugno's single was released on 23 August 1958 and debuted at number 15. The following week it rose and peaked at number ten on the UK Singles Chart. Eight other versions recorded by international artists were also released in the UK. It peaked at number two on the Norwegian VG-lista Topp 20 Singles and on the Dutch Mega Single Top 100.

The song's popularity endures, and in 2004, according to the Italian Society of Authors and Publishers, it was the most played Italian song in Italy as well as in the whole world. Moreover, the combined sales of all the recorded versions of the song exceed eighteen million units.

== Accolades ==
=== Awards ===
During the 1st Grammy Awards, held on 4 May 1959 at Hollywood's Beverly Hilton Hotel, "Nel blu dipinto di blu" received two awards: for Record of the Year and for Song of the Year. The song is the only foreign-language recording to achieve this honour, and it is the only song competing in the Eurovision Song Contest to receive a Grammy Award.

In 2001, seven years after his death, Modugno was awarded with the Sanremo Music Festival Special Award, "given to the one who, ... in 1958, with 'Nel blu dipinto di blu', turned the Sanremo Music Festival in a stage of worldwide relevance." During 2008's Sanremo Music Festival, lyricist Franco Migliacci and Modugno's widow, Franca Gandolfi, received the special Award for Creativity for the song, presented by Italian Society of Authors and Publishers' chairman Giorgio Assumma.

In 2023, it received a nomination at the first SIAE Music Awards for the category Song in Clubs with Live Music. The nomination was based on 2023 music consumption data collected by SIAE.

=== Honours ===
The song was one of fourteen songs chosen by Eurovision fans and a European Broadcasting Union (EBU) reference group, from among the 992 songs that had ever participated in the contest, to participate in the fiftieth anniversary competition Congratulations: 50 Years of the Eurovision Song Contest held on 22 October 2005 in Copenhagen. At the event, "Nel blu dipinto di blu" was ranked second on the list of the "all time favourite songs of the Eurovision Song Contest", behind ABBA's "Waterloo". ABBA member Benny Andersson, while receiving the prize, commented:

I myself voted for "Volare" but I am pleased that so many people voted for us.

In 2008, the 50th anniversary of the song was celebrated in Italy by releasing a postage stamp showing a man who is flying on a blue background. During the 2010 Viña del Mar International Song Festival, the song, performed by Italian singer Simona Galeandro, was also declared the most popular song of the 20th century, winning the international competition of the contest.

== Plagiarism allegation ==
Immediately after the release of "Nel blu dipinto di blu", Antonio De Marco accused Domenico Modugno and lyricist Franco Migliacci of plagiarising his 1956 song "Il castello dei sogni". Though the song was not released, it had been played during some concerts in the previous years. During the trial for plagiarism, De Marco claimed that he lost his sheet music in Rome while registering his song with the Italian Society of Authors and Publishers, suggesting that Modugno somehow found it and plagiarised both the lyrics and the music of his composition. However, the Rome court of justice absolved Modugno and Migliacci, following the opinion of an expert who stated that the two songs did not have any relevant similarity.

As a response, Modugno sued De Marco for defamation, and in July 1958 De Marco was convicted by the Milan court of justice.

== Track listings ==
7" 45 rpm record (1958 – Fonit Cetra SP 30222)
No.	Title	Writer(s)	Length
1.	"Nel blu dipinto di blu"	Franco Migliacci, Domenico Modugno	3:34
2.	"Vecchio frak"	Modugno	4:12

7" 45 rpm record (1958 – Fonit Cetra 15948)
No.	Title	Writer(s)	Length
1.	"Nel blu dipinto di blu"	Migliacci, Modugno	3:34
2.	"Nisciuno po' sapè"	Modugno, Riccardo Pazzaglia	3:26

7" 45 rpm record (1958 – Fonit Cetra SP 30208)
No.	Title	Writer(s)	Length
1.	"Nel blu dipinto di blu"	Migliacci, Modugno	3:34
2.	"Strada 'nfosa"	Modugno	3:44

7" 45 rpm record (1958 – Fonit Cetra SP 30223)
No.	Title	Writer(s)	Length
1.	"Nel blu dipinto di blu"	Migliacci, Modugno	3:34
2.	"Lazzarella"	Modugno, Pazzaglia	3:11

== Credits and personnel ==
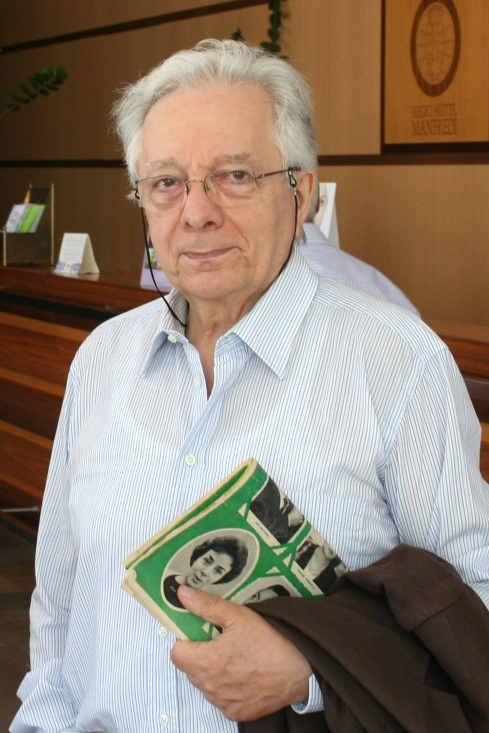
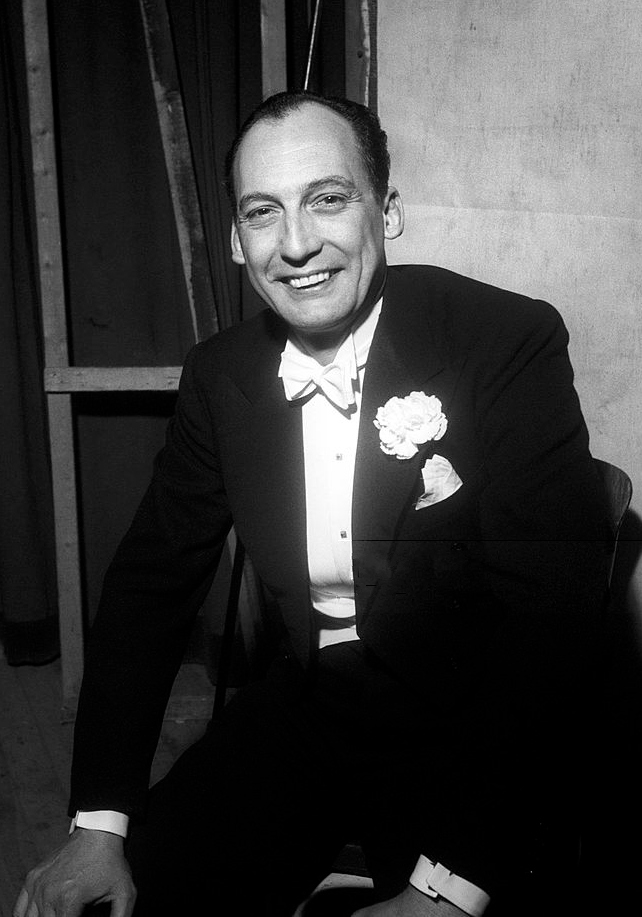
Franco Migliacci (left) and Alberto Semprini (right) worked on "Nel blu dipinto di blu" as lyricist and orchestra conductor, respectively.
- Domenico Modugno – vocals, composer, lyricist
- Franco Migliacci – Lyricist
- Alberto Semprini – orchestra conductor
- Sestetto Azzurro – musicians
  - Walter Beduschi – bass
  - Bruno De Filippi – guitar
  - Pupo De Luca – drums
  - Ebe Mautino – harp
  - Mario Migliardi – Hammond organ
  - Alberto Semprini – piano

Credits adapted from Discografia Nazionale della Canzone Italiana.

== Charts ==
=== Weekly charts ===
Chart (1958)	Peak position
Belgium (Ultratop 50 Flanders)	5
Belgium (Ultratop 50 Wallonia)	6
Canada (CHUM Chart)	2
Netherlands (Single Top 100)	2
Norway (VG-lista)	2
UK Singles (The Official Charts Company)	10
US Billboard Hot 100	1
US R&B Best Sellers in Stores (Billboard)	2
Chart (2013)	Peak position
Italy (FIMI)	55

=== All-time charts ===
Chart (1958–2018)	Position
US Billboard Hot 100	167

=== Certifications and sales ===
Region	Certification	Certified units/sales
Italy	—	1,000,000
Italy (FIMI) sales since 2009	Gold	35,000^{‡}
Lebanon	—	7,000
United States physical	—	2,000,000
United States (RIAA) digital, Dean Martin Version	Gold	500,000^{‡}
^{‡} Sales+streaming figures based on certification alone.

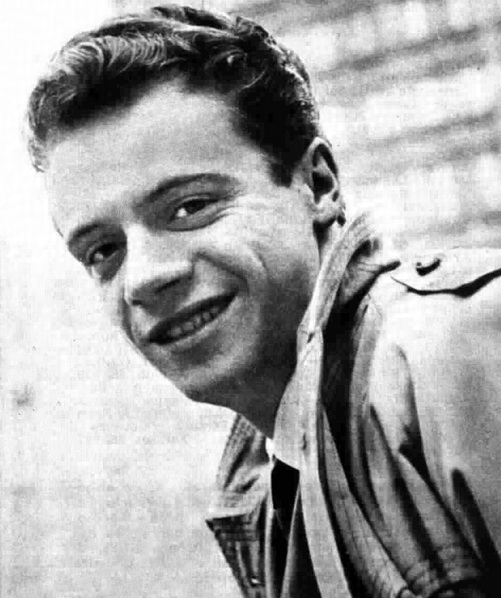
Johnny Dorelli, winner with Domenico Modugno of the 1958 Sanremo Festival

== Johnny Dorelli version ==
"Nel blu, dipinto di blu"

Single by Johnny Dorelli

from the album Johnny Dorelli al Festival di Sanremo
- B-side: "Giuro d'amarti così"
- Released: 21 January 1958
- Recorded: 1957
- Genre: Pop
- Length: 2:23
- Label: Cgd
- Songwriter: Domenico Modugno
- Composer: Domenico Modugno
- Lyricists: Domenico Modugno, Franco Migliacci

Johnny Dorelli singles chronology
"Un amore splendido/Tipitipitipso" (1957)	"Nel blu, dipinto di blu" (1958)	"Fantastica/Fragole e cappellini" (1958)

There have been many Italian artists who, over the years, have recorded their own version of "Nel blu dipinto di blu". The first, in chronological order, was Italian singer Johnny Dorelli. Dorelli had sung "Nel blu dipinto di blu", in association with Modugno, at the Sanremo Festival: then his record company, CGD of Milan, released the song as a 45 rpm single; on this recording the orchestra was conducted by maestro Gianni Ferrio. A month later the song was included in Dorelli's album entitled "Johnny Dorelli al Festival di Sanremo" (Johnny Dorelli at the Sanremo Festival) and in the extended play of the same title.

== Nilla Pizzi version ==
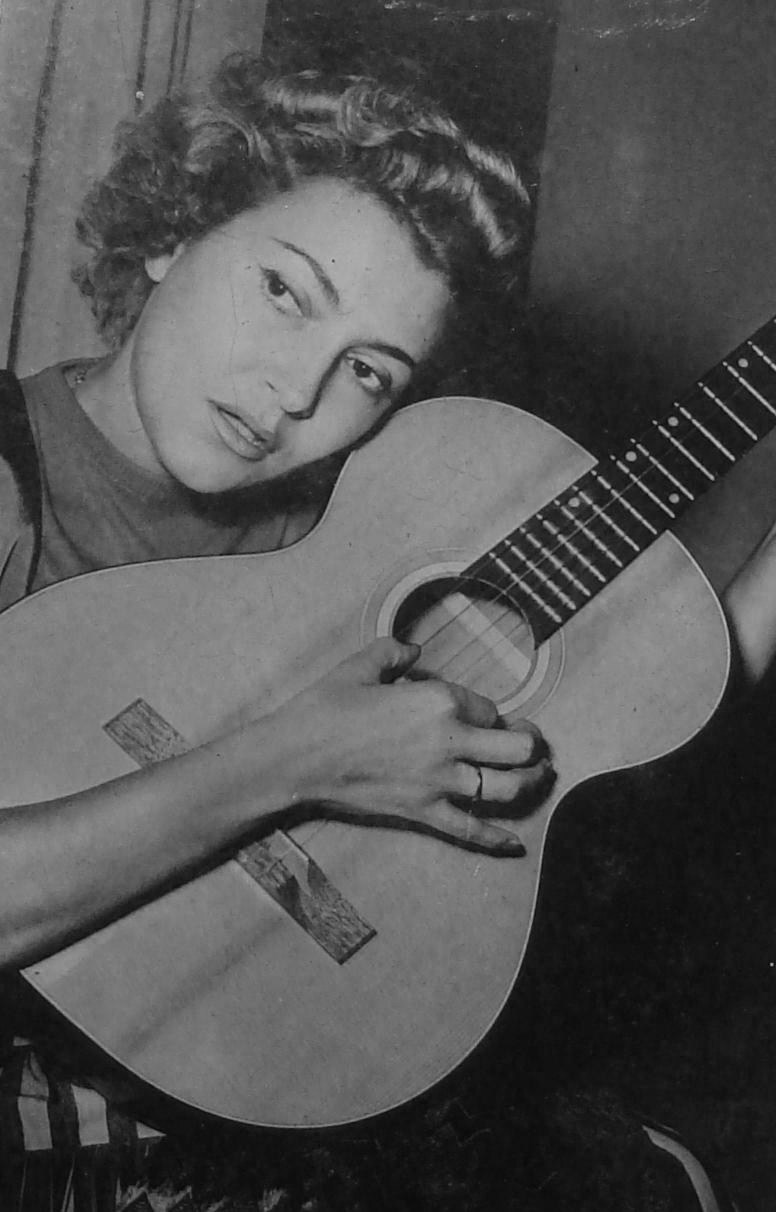
Nilla Pizzi, one of the performers who recorded "Nel blu dipinto di blu", in 1958

"Nel blu, dipinto di blu"

Single by Nilla Pizzi
- A-side: "L'edera"
- Released: 21 January 1958
- Recorded: 1957
- Genre: Pop
- Label: RCA Italiana
- Songwriter: Domenico Modugno
- Composer: Domenico Modugno
- Lyricists: Domenico Modugno, Franco Migliacci

Nilla Pizzi singles chronology
"Ti scrivo e piango/A tu per tu" (1958)	"Nel blu, dipinto di blu" (1958)	"La canzone che piace a te/Amare un altro" (1958)

In the same month, January 1958, as the release of the two 45 rpm records by Domenico Modugno and Johnny Dorelli, the Italian singer Nilla Pizzi (who had been the winner of the first two editions of the Sanremo Festival) also recorded it on the B-side of L'edera, the song she had performed at the Sanremo Festival and which had come in second place. This version of Nel blu dipinto di blu was arranged by maestro Marcello De Martino, and was then included in the EP Sanremo 1958 N. 2.

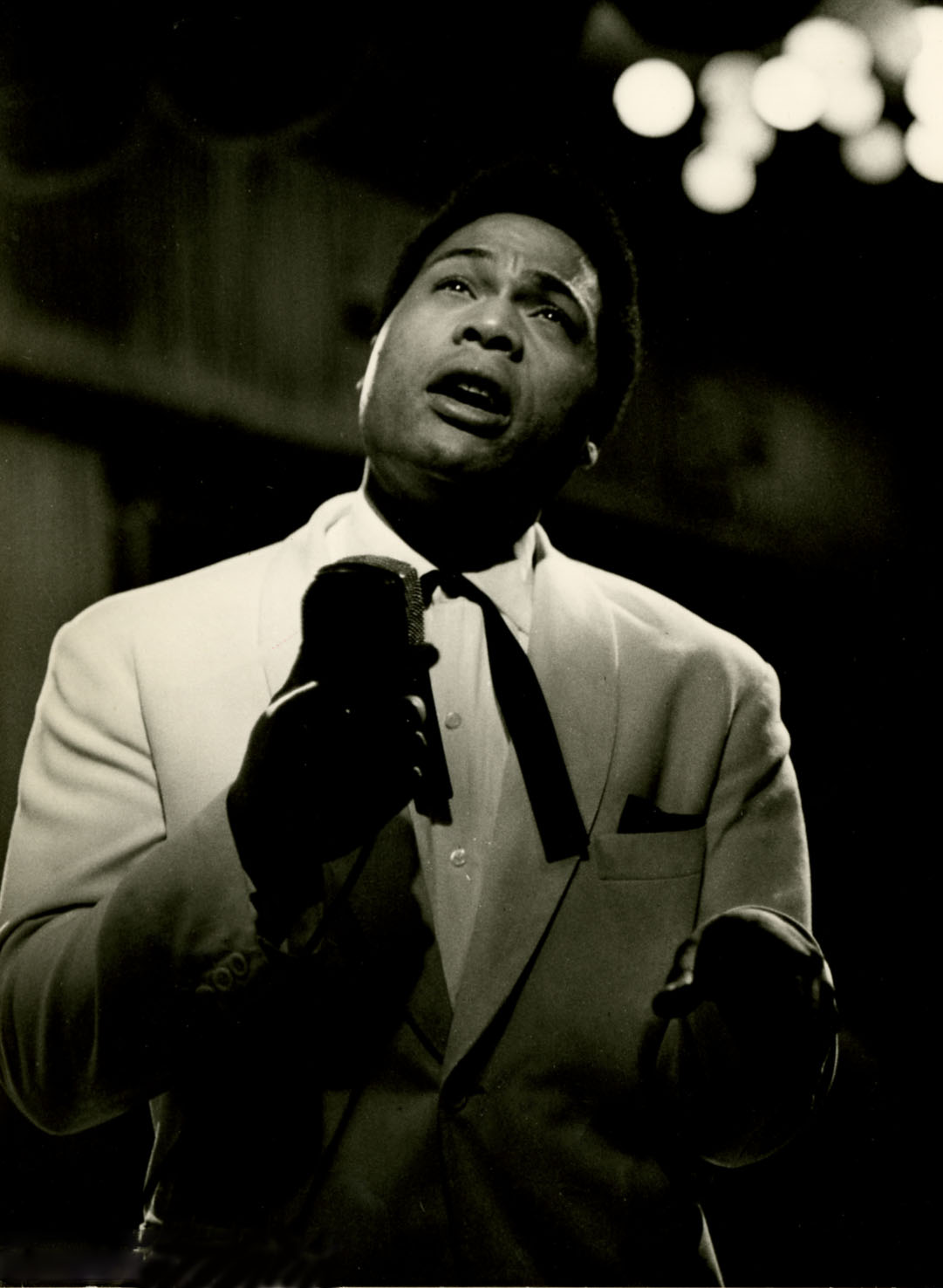
Don Marino Barreto Jr.

== Don Marino Barreto Jr. version ==
"Nel blu, dipinto di blu"

Single by Don Marino Barreto Jr.

from the album Sogni di fumo
- B-side: "Lontan da me"
- Released: October 13, 1958
- Recorded: 1957
- Genre: Pop
- Label: Philips Records
- Songwriter: Domenico Modugno
- Composer: Domenico Modugno
- Lyricists: Domenico Modugno, Franco Migliacci

Don Marino Barreto Jr. singles chronology
"Songo 'nnammurato/Ogni giorno" (1958)	"Nel blu, dipinto di blu" (1958)	"Hasta la vista... senora/Maria" (1958)

Cuban-Italian pop singer and musician Don Marino Barreto Jr., moved to Italy in 1949, also recorded Nel blu dipinto di blu in the same yearas a 45 rpm single; on this recording all instruments are played by the Barreto Orchestra; this version was included in the EP Don Marino Barreto Junior 8 and some month later the song was included in Barreto's album entitled "Sogni di fumo" (Smoking Dreams).

== Legacy ==
"Volare"

Single by Bobby Rydell

from the album Bobby Sings, Bobby Swings
- B-side: "I'd Do It Again"
- Released: July 1960
- Recorded: 1960
- Genre: Pop
- Length: 2:23
- Label: Cameo
- Songwriters: Domenico Modugno, Mitchell Parish

Bobby Rydell singles chronology
"Ding-A-Ling" (1960)	"Volare" (1960)	"Sway" (1960)

There were more than 100 different recordings of the song worldwide, including over thirty in France and fifteen in the United States. Dean Martin recorded a version which alternates between the original Italian lyrics (Martin spoke fluent Italian) and English lyrics adapted by Mitchell Parish. Martin's version appeared on his LP This Is Dean Martin! (1958). Martin's song, titled "Volare (Nel blu dipinto di blu)", was also released as a single, reaching number two on the UK Singles Chart, peaking at number three in Norway, number fifteen on the Billboard Hot 100, and number 27 in Canada. A version by Umberto Marcato also made a brief appearance on the Canadian charts at number 20 on 4 August 1958.

In the United Kingdom, Italian musician Marino Marini's cover peaked at number thirteen in October, and Charlie Drake's version reached number 28. The McGuire Sisters' version, also released as a single, peaked at number 80 on the Billboard Hot 100 in the US, and entered the Norwegian Singles Chart at number seven. Earl Grant covered the song on his album The End on 25 September.

Also in 1958, a famous Puerto Rican group called Cortijo y su Combo, who featured the bandleader and percussionist Rafael Cortijo with his long time friend and singer Ismael Rivera, one of the most influential figures in what later would be named Salsa music, recorded a Spanish version in their own Puerto Rican style that would immediately become one of their most well known songs. A live version can be heard in their live album El Alma de un Pueblo released in 1958 and a studio version was included in their 1960 compilation album Fiesta Boricua.

In 1960, the song was recorded by Italian-American singer Bobby Rydell, reaching number four on the Hot 100 during the summer of 1960, number 22 in the UK, and number three in Canada.

There was an instrumental version by Ray Conniff on his album The Happy Beat, released in 1963.

Another charting version of the song was released in 1975 by American traditional pop singer Al Martino, and included in his album To the Door of the Sun. His single peaked at number 33 in the US, reached number 3 on the Dutch Single Top 100, and reached number 31 in the Canadian AC charts in December 1975, being certified gold by the Canadian Recording Industry Association.

Randy Newman quoted the Italian lyrics in his song "Kathleen (Catholicism Made Easy)" on his 1977 album Little Criminals. Newman's own lyrics state (incorrectly) that the Italian "means you love him and he loves you."

In 1986, David Bowie recorded a version of the song, sung entirely in Italian, for the film Absolute Beginners and its accompanying soundtrack album.

In 1989, Gipsy Kings recorded an up-tempo rumba flamenca version of the song, with lyrics partly in Italian and partly in Spanish. Their version topped the Billboard Hot Latin Songs chart in April 1990 and reached number 86 in the UK chart. It also charted in France and the Netherlands, peaking at number 16 and at number 26 and also, earn a platinum award in Spain. respectively. The music video won two awards in the Latin field, one for the group (Best Duo or Group) and Best Director for Markus Blunder.

In 1991, Barry White covered the song for his album Put Me in Your Mix. In this version, the first verse is sung in Italian, the second verse is in English, and the chorus and bridges are in both languages. Near the end, he credits Domenico Modugno as the writer and original performer.

In 2003, Vitamin C recorded a pop cover for the soundtrack for The Lizzie McGuire Movie which was recorded in both English and Italian.

In 2006, G4 recorded a cover for their third album Act Three.

In February 2010, a cover of the song performed by Italian singer Simona Galeandro won the international competition of the 2010 Viña del Mar International Song Festival.

One year later, a version of the song performed by Emma Marrone was included in the soundtrack of the Italian movie Benvenuti al Nord, directed by Luca Miniero. Marrone's cover reached number 70 on the Italian Singles Chart.

Ann-Margret covered the song on her 2023 album, Born to Be Wild.

In June 2024, David Bisbal covered the song as "Andaré" in an advertising campaign for AENA.

Lucio Corsi covered the song as a duet with Topo Gigio at the Sanremo Music Festival 2025 in which he ultimately placed second.

Mariah Carey performed the song during the opening ceremony of the 2026 Winter Olympics.

=== Dalida version ===
==== Charts ====
Chart (1958)	Peak position
France (IFOP)	1
Flanders (Ultratop50 Singles)	5
Wallonia (Ultratop50 Singles)	6
Quebec	3

== See also ==
- List of number-one singles in Australia during the 1950s
- List of Hot 100 number-one singles of 1958 (U.S.)
- List of number-one Billboard Hot Latin Tracks of 1990
