= Belgium in the Eurovision Song Contest 1958 =

- Eurovision Song Contest 1958
- Participating broadcaster: Institut national de radiodiffusion (INR) (Note: Institut national de radiodiffusion (INR) was the official French-language name of the National Broadcasting Institute (NIR/INR).)
- Country: Belgium
- Selection process: Grand Prix Eurovision de la Chanson Européenne: Demi-Finale Belge
- Selection date: 19 February 1958

Competing entry
- Song: "Ma petite chatte"
- Artist: Fud Leclerc
- Songwriter: André Dohet

Placement
- Final result: 5th, 8 votes

Participation chronology

Belgium was represented at the Eurovision Song Contest 1958 with the song "Ma petite chatte", written by André Dohet, and performed by Fud Leclerc. The French-speaking department of the Belgian participating broadcaster, the National Broadcasting Institute (NIR/INR), selected its entry through a national final.

== Before Eurovision ==
=== Grand Prix Eurovision de la Chanson Européenne: Demi-Finale Belge ===
The National Broadcasting Institute (NIR/INR), whose official name in French was Institut national de radiodiffusion (INR), delegated its participation in the Eurovision Song Contest 1958 to its French-speaking department, which developed the national final format Grand Prix Eurovision de la Chanson Européenne: Demi-Finale Belge in order to select its entry. The competition was held on 19 February 1958 and broadcast on INR.

==== Competing entries ====
After opening a submission period for songs, INR had received about 500 songs by the end of the deadline. Between 4 and 6 February 1958, a professional jury listened to and shortlisted ten entries for the competition. The jury consisted of: Angèle Guller, David Bee, Léon Jongen, Jean Omer, Peter Packay, Jaap Streefkerk, Robert Wasmuth, and René Hénoumont, with Robert Ledent as the chairman of the jury. Aside from the winner, no other information about any of the artists, song titles, or songwriters is known, except for the title of one more song.

Artist	Song	Songwriter(s)
Fud Leclerc	"Ma petite chatte"	André Dohet
Unknown	"Il y a des rues"	Unknown

==== Final ====
The final was held on 19 February 1958 at 20:40 CET and broadcast on INR. The entries were first performed as instrumentals by the orchestra, and then were performed again with the singers. The results were done over two rounds of voting. In the first round, audience members exclusively selected the top five entries to proceed to the second round. In the second round, the winner, "Ma petite chatte" performed by Fud Leclerc, was selected through the votes of a jury panel among 5 superfinalists.

== At Eurovision ==
The contest was broadcast on INR and NIR and on radio station Bruxelles I.

On the night of the final, Wednesday 12 March 1958, Fud Leclerc performed seventh in the running order, following Denmark and preceding Germany. At the close of voting "Ma petite chatte" had received 8 votes, placing Belgium join fifth (with Austria) of the 10 entries.

The Belgian entry was conducted at the contest by the musical director Dolf van der Linden.

=== Voting ===
Every participating broadcaster assembled a jury of ten people. Every jury member could give one vote to his or her favourite song.

Votes awarded to Belgium
Score	Country
5 votes	Germany
1 vote	Denmark; Sweden; Switzerland

Votes awarded by Belgium
Score	Country
4 votes	Italy
2 votes	Switzerland
1 vote	Austria; France; Germany; Sweden
