= 1958 in German television =

This is a list of German television related events from 1958.

== Events ==
- 20 January - Margot Hielscher is selected to represent Germany at the 1958 Eurovision Song Contest with her song "Für zwei Groschen Musik". She is selected to be the third German Eurovision entry during Schlager held at the Kleine Westfalenhalle in Dortmund.

== Debuts ==
=== ARD ===
- 10 January – Sie schreiben mit (1958–1970)
- 14 March – Stahlnetz (1958–1968)
- 13 September – Nachsitzen für Erwachsene (1958–1966)

=== DFF ===
- 12 November – Haare hoch! (1958– 1959)

== Television shows ==
=== 1950s ===
- Tagesschau (1952–present)

== Births ==
- 26 September - Sabrina Fox, TV host
- 24 October - Margit Geissler-Rothemund, actress
