= Italy in the Eurovision Song Contest 1958 =

- Eurovision Song Contest 1958
- Participating broadcaster: Radiotelevisione italiana (RAI)
- Country: Italy
- Selection process: Sanremo Music Festival 1958
- Selection date: 1 February 1958

Competing entry
- Song: "Nel blu, dipinto di blu"
- Artist: Domenico Modugno
- Songwriters: Domenico Modugno; Franco Migliacci

Placement
- Final result: 3rd, 13 votes

Participation chronology

Italy was represented at the Eurovision Song Contest 1958 with the song '"Nel blu, dipinto di blu", written by Domenico Modugno and Franco Migliacci, and performed by Modugno himself. The Italian participating broadcaster, Radiotelevisione italiana (RAI) chose the winning song from the Sanremo Music Festival 1958 as its Eurovision entry: the song had been performed twice at Sanremo and Modugno was chosen over Johnny Dorelli as its performer in Eurovision.

Although "Nel blu, dipinto di blu" did not win at Eurovision, it went on after the contest (under the title "Volare") to become a huge worldwide hit. The song spent five weeks at the top of the US Singles Chart, was later named the Billboard Year-End number one single for 1958, and won two Grammy Awards for Record of the Year and Song of the Year. It is also one of only three non-British / non-winning Eurovision songs ever to have reached the top 10 in the United Kingdom.

The song's popularity has not diminished with time and it rapidly assumed the status of a worldwide musical standard. It is invariably cited, along with ABBA's "Waterloo", as globally the most successful and instantly recognisable song ever to have emerged from Eurovision.

== At Eurovision ==
On the night of the final Modugno performed first in the running order, preceding the Netherlands. However, a technical problem meant that the performance had not been seen in all countries, so Modugno was required to perform the song again after all the other entries had been sung – it remained the only time in Eurovision history that a song has had to be performed twice in its entirety until 2010 when Spain was allowed to do the same after their first performance was disturbed.

At the close of the voting "Nel blu, dipinto di blu" had received 13 votes (the highest being 4s from Belgium and Germany), placing Italy third of the 10 entries. The Italian jury awarded 6 of its 10 votes to contest winners France.

The contest was televised on RAI Televisione and on radio station Secondo Programma, both with commentary by Bianca Maria Piccinino.

=== Voting ===
Each participating broadcaster assembled a ten-member jury panel. Every jury member could give one vote to his or her favourite song.

Votes awarded to Italy
Score	Country
4 votes	Belgium; Germany
1 votes	Austria; France; Netherlands; Sweden; Switzerland

Votes awarded by Italy
Score	Country
6 votes	France
4 votes	Switzerland

== Congratulations: 50 Years of the Eurovision Song Contest ==
In 2005, "Nel blu, dipinto di blu" was one of fourteen songs chosen by Eurovision fans and an EBU reference group to participate in the Congratulations anniversary competition. It was the only Italian entry featured and the only song from the 1950s represented, as well as one of three participating songs that hadn't actually won in its year (the others being "Congratulations" by Cliff Richard and "Eres tú" by Mocedades). Italy didn't broadcast the event (it likewise hadn't broadcast the Eurovision Song Contest since their last participation in 1997 and wouldn't again until 2011), but were represented by both "Nel blu, dipinto di blu" and references to their Eurovision entries in both clip montages and one live performance (Belgium's Sandra Kim, who won the contest in 1986, performed a brief rendition of Gigliola Cinquetti's 1964 winner "Non ho l'eta" during one of the medleys).

"Nel blu, dipinto di blu" appeared sixth in the running order, following "Ein bißchen Frieden" by Nicole and preceding "Waterloo" by ABBA. While the majority of performances that night featured brief appearances by the original singer(s), Domenico Modugno had died in 1994. Therefore, the song was represented by footage of his original performance alongside dancers performing a routine. At the end of the first round, "Nel blu, dipinto di blu" was announced as one of the five songs headed to the second round. It was later revealed that the song finished as runner-up in the first round, receiving 200 points (as, unlike in 1958, the twelve-point system introduced in 1975 was being used, and the song's reputation had grown significantly since its original appearance). In the end, "Nel blu, dipinto di blu" finished in second place overall with 267 points. Among these were three top scores from Germany, Lithuania, and Turkey.

=== Voting ===
Points awarded to "Nel blu, dipinto di blu" (Round 1)
Score	Country
12 points	
10 points	Croatia; Russia; Slovenia; Turkey
8 points	Finland; Greece; Lithuania; Monaco; Portugal; Serbia and Montenegro; Spain; Switzerland
7 points	Austria; Bosnia and Herzegovina; Germany; Iceland; Macedonia; Romania
6 points	Andorra; Belgium; Latvia; Malta; Poland; Ukraine
5 points	Cyprus; Sweden
4 points	Israel
3 points	
2 points	Ireland; Norway
1 point	

Points awarded to "Nel blu, dipinto di blu" (Round 2)
Score	Country
12 points	Germany; Lithuania; Turkey
10 points	Andorra; Austria; Bosnia and Herzegovina; Finland; Iceland; Monaco; Russia; Slovenia; Spain; Switzerland
8 points	Belgium; Croatia; Greece; Latvia; Macedonia; Malta; Poland; Portugal
7 points	Cyprus; Ireland; Israel; Romania; Serbia and Montenegro; Sweden; Ukraine
6 points	Denmark; Netherlands; Norway
