= Netherlands in the Eurovision Song Contest 1958 =

- Eurovision Song Contest 1958
- Participating broadcaster: Nederlandse Televisie Stichting (NTS)
- Country: Netherlands
- Selection process: Nationaal Songfestival 1958
- Selection date: 11 February 1958

Competing entry
- Song: "Heel de wereld"
- Artist: Corry Brokken
- Songwriter: Benny Vreden

Placement
- Final result: 9th, 1 vote

Participation chronology

The Netherlands was represented at the Eurovision Song Contest 1958 with the song "Heel de wereld", written by Benny Vreden, and performed by Corry Brokken. The Dutch participating Broadcaster, Nederlandse Televisie Stichting (NTS), selected its entry through a national final. In addition, NTS was also the host broadcaster and staged the event at the AVRO Studios in Hilversum, after winning the previous edition with the song "Net als toen" by Corry Brokken. This was the third time Brokken represented the Netherlands in the contest.

== Before Eurovision ==
=== Nationaal Songfestival 1958 ===
The national final took place at the AVRO Studios in Hilversum (the same venue in which the Eurovision final took place), hosted by Tanja Koen. Eleven songs and six singers were involved, with all participants other than Anneke van der Graaf performing two songs.

The winning song was chosen by postcard voting; the full ranking of the songs is known, but information on votes received is only available for the top five songs.

11 February 1958
R/O	Artist	Song	Votes	Place
1	Greetje Kauffeld	"Stewardess"	3,733	3
2	Willy Alberti	"Met elke lach van jou"	Unknown	9
3	Rita Reys	"Een verlicht raam"	Unknown	11
4	Bruce Low	"Wiegelied voor Marjolein"	2,350	4
5	Corry Brokken	"Weet je"	4,036	2
6	Anneke van der Graaf	"Lentedag"	Unknown	8
7	Rita Reys	"De warmte van je hart"	Unknown	6
8	Willy Alberti	"Marjan"	Unknown	7
9	Greetje Kauffeld	"Een afscheid zonder meer"	1,049	5
10	Bruce Low	"Neem dat maar aan van mij"	Unknown	10
11	Corry Brokken	"Heel de wereld"	8,148	1

== At Eurovision ==
On the night of the final Brokken performed second in the running order, following Italy and preceding France. At the close of voting "Heel de wereld" had received only 1 vote (from Switzerland), placing the Netherlands joint last (with Luxembourg) of the 10 entries.

The Dutch entry was conducted at the contest by the musical director Dolf van der Linden.

Brokken thus became the only performer in Eurovision history ever to have finished both first and last; it was also the only year, until 2015, in which the host country ended the evening at the bottom of the scoreboard.

The contest was televised on NTS and on radio station Hilversum 1, both with commentary by Siebe van der Zee.

=== Voting ===
Each participating broadcaster assembled a ten-member jury panel. Every jury member could give one vote to his or her favourite song.

Votes awarded to the Netherlands
Score	Country
1 vote	Switzerland

Votes awarded by the Netherlands
Score	Country
6 votes	Switzerland
2 votes	Sweden
1 votes	Denmark; Italy
