= Eurovision Song Contest 1958 =

International song competition

Coordinates: 52°14′N 5°11′E

Date and venue
- Final: 12 March 1958
- Venue: AVRO Studios; Hilversum, Netherlands

Organisation
- Organiser: European Broadcasting Union (EBU)

Production
- Host broadcaster: Nederlandse Televisie Stichting (NTS)
- Director: Gijs Stappershoef
- Executive producer: Piet te Nuyl Jr.
- Musical director: Dolf van der Linden
- Presenter: Hannie Lips

Participants
- Number of entries: 10
- Debuting countries: Sweden
- Non-returning countries: United Kingdom
- Participation map: Competing countries Countries that participated in the past but not in 1958

Vote
- Voting system: Ten-member juries in each country; each member gave one vote to their favourite song
- Winning song: France "Dors mon amour"

The Eurovision Song Contest 1958, originally known as the Grand Prix Eurovision de la Chanson Européenne 1958 (English: Grand Prix of the Eurovision Song Contest 1958), was the third edition of the Eurovision Song Contest, held on Wednesday 12 March 1958 at the AVRO Studios in Hilversum, the Netherlands, and presented by Hannie Lips. It was organised by the European Broadcasting Union (EBU) and host broadcaster Nederlandse Televisie Stichting (NTS). This marked the first time that the contest was hosted by the preceding year's winning broadcaster, a tradition that has been continued, with some exceptions, ever since.

Broadcasters from ten countries participated in the contest, equalling the number which took part the previous year; Sweden made its first appearance in the contest, while the United Kingdom decided not to participate.

The winner of the contest was France, represented by the song "Dors mon amour" performed by André Claveau, marking the first of five eventual wins for the country. Switzerland, Italy, Sweden and Belgium (in joint fifth with Austria) rounded out the top five.

Although the French song made an impact at the contest, another entry made an even greater impact following the contest; the Italian entry, "Nel blu, dipinto di blu" performed by Domenico Modugno, became a worldwide hit for Modugno, winning two Grammy Awards in 1959 and becoming a chart success in several countries.

== Location ==
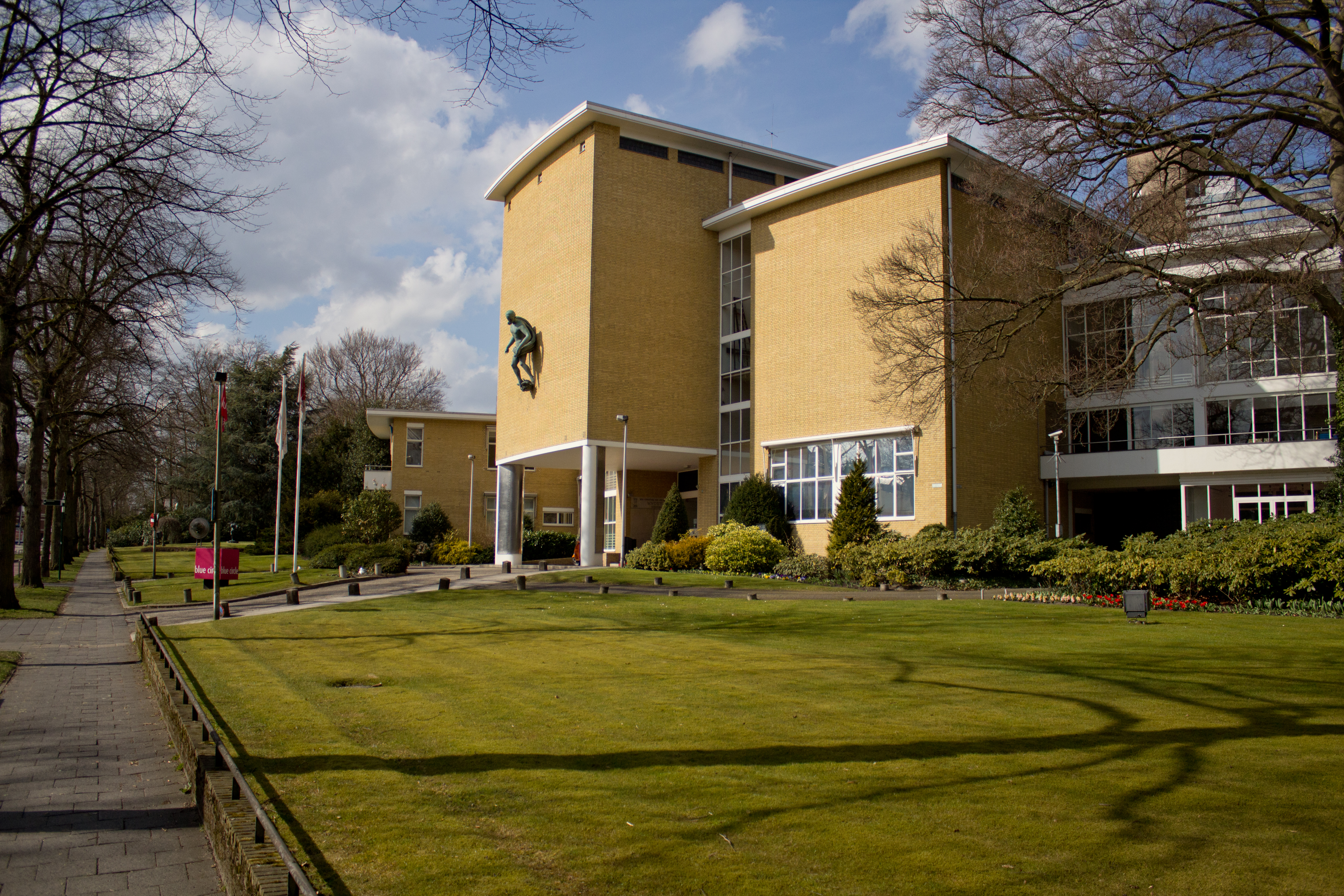
AVRO Studios, Hilversum – host venue of the 1958 contest

The 1958 contest took place in Hilversum, the Netherlands. The selected venue was the AVRO Studios, which served at the time as the main radio and television broadcasting facilities of the Dutch broadcaster AVRO. Often called "media city", Hilversum is the principal centre for radio and television broadcasting in the Netherlands and is the location of several of the organisations that make up the Nederlandse Publieke Omroep (NPO) public broadcasting organisation.

Although they had won in 1957, the Netherlands' did not receive automatic rights to host the contest, as the convention in place at the time specified that each broadcaster would stage the event in turns. The British Broadcasting Corporation (BBC) had been the first choice to stage the event in the United Kingdom, but gave up the rights after failing to reach agreement with artistic unions. Subsequently, the Dutch broadcaster, Nederlandse Televisie Stichting (NTS), only received the rights to host the event after other broadcasters declined the opportunity. This established the tradition that the previous year's winner would host it the following year.

== Participants ==
Eurovision Song Contest 1958 – Participation summaries by country
- Austria; Belgium; Denmark; France; Germany; Italy; Luxembourg; Netherlands; Sweden; Switzerland

Ten countries participated in the 1958 contest, the same number as had featured in the previous year's event. Sweden entered the contest for the first time, while the United Kingdom decided not to compete, despite having originally intended to participate and being listed as one of the participating countries in the original rules dated November 1957. Monaco had also intended to submit an entry, but ultimately did not feature among the participating nations.

Several of the participants had previously competed in the contest. Switzerland's Lys Assia and the Netherlands' Corry Brokken had both represented their countries in 1956 and 1957, and were both former winners; Assia was the first winner of the contest in 1956 with the song "Refrain", and had also performed Switzerland's other entry in that contest "Das alte Karussell", while Brokken had performed "Voorgoed voorbij" in the 1956 contest, one of the Netherlands' two entries, and was then the winner the following year with the song "Net als toen". Fud Leclerc had also competed for Belgium in 1956, performing "Messieurs les noyés de la Seine", one of the country's two entries, and Margot Hielscher returned for a second year in a row, after representing Germany in 1957 with "Telefon, Telefon".

Eurovision Song Contest 1958 participants
Country	Broadcaster	Artist	Song	Language	Songwriter(s)	Conductor
Austria	ORF	Liane Augustin	"Die ganze Welt braucht Liebe"	German	Günther Leopold; Kurt Werner	Willy Fantl
Belgium	INR	Fud Leclerc	"Ma petite chatte"	French	André Dohet	Dolf van der Linden
Denmark	Statsradiofonien	Raquel Rastenni	"Jeg rev et blad ud af min dagbog"	Danish	Harry Jensen	Kai Mortensen
France	RTF	André Claveau	"Dors mon amour"	French	Pierre Delanoë; Hubert Giraud	Franck Pourcel
Germany	NWRV (Note: On behalf of the German public broadcasting consortium ARD)	Margot Hielscher	"Für zwei Groschen Musik"	German	Walter Brandin; Friedrich Meyer; Fred Rauch	Dolf van der Linden
Italy	RAI	Domenico Modugno	"Nel blu, dipinto di blu"	Italian	Franco Migliacci; Domenico Modugno	Alberto Semprini
Luxembourg	CLT	Solange Berry	"Un grand amour"	French	Michel Eric; Monique Laniece; Raymond Roche	Dolf van der Linden
Netherlands	NTS	Corry Brokken	"Heel de wereld"	Dutch	Benny Vreden	Dolf van der Linden
Sweden	SR	Alice Babs	"Lilla stjärna"	Swedish	Åke Gerhard; Gunnar Wersén	Dolf van der Linden
Switzerland	SRG SSR	Lys Assia	"Giorgio"	German, Italian	Paul Burkhard; Fridolin Tschudi	Paul Burkhard

== Format ==
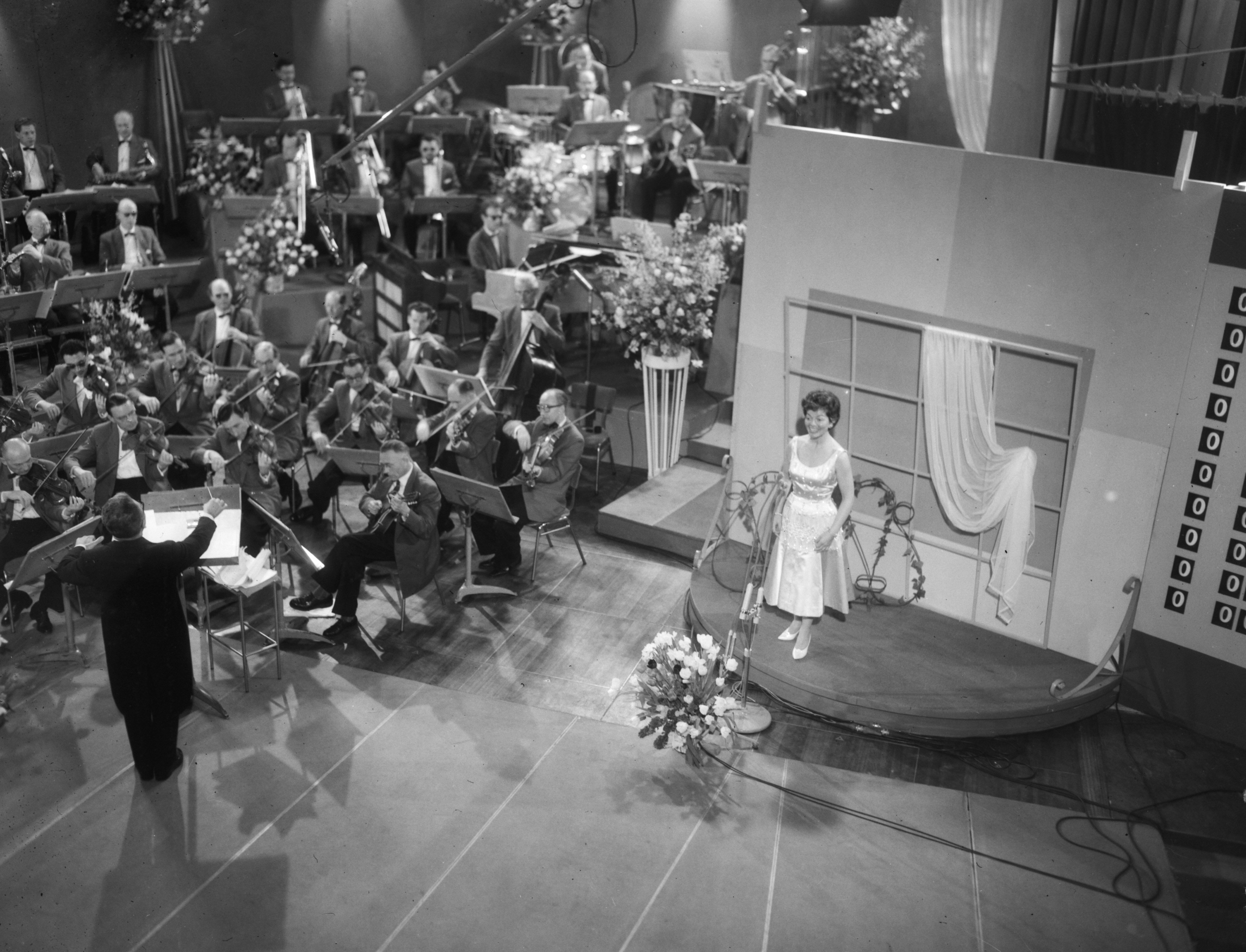
The stage and orchestra at the Eurovision Song Contest 1958

The contest was organised and broadcast by NTS, with Piet te Nuyl Jr. serving as producer, Gijs Stappershoef serving as director, and Dolf van der Linden serving as musical director, leading the Metropole Orkest during the event. Each participating delegation was allowed to nominate its own musical director to lead the orchestra during the performance of its country's entry, with the host musical director also conducting for those countries which did not nominate their own conductor.

Held in one of the studios of the AVRO broadcasting complex, the hall contained a small stage for the singers, with the orchestra situated stage right. The rear of the performance area had interchangeable backgrounds for each song to add context to each song's lyrics, which could also be removed to show the scoreboard during the voting sequence, and the venue was decorated with thousands of tulips.

No significant changes to the rules of the 1957 contest were implemented; each country, participating through one EBU member broadcaster, was represented by one song performed by up to two people on stage. Due to several entries having violated the duration limit in the previous event, the maximum song limit of 3 minutes and 30 seconds was more stringently enforced for this year's entries. The voting system was the same as the one used the previous year; the results were determined through jury voting, with each country's jury containing ten individuals who each gave one vote to their favourite song, with no abstentions allowed and with jurors unable to vote for their own country.

== Contest overview ==
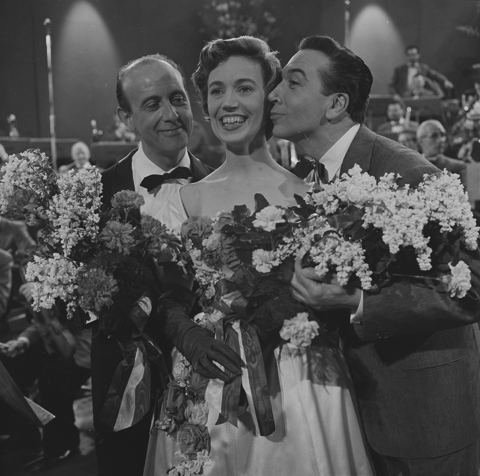
André Claveau (right) celebrating with conductor Franck Pourcel and host Hannie Lips after winning the contest

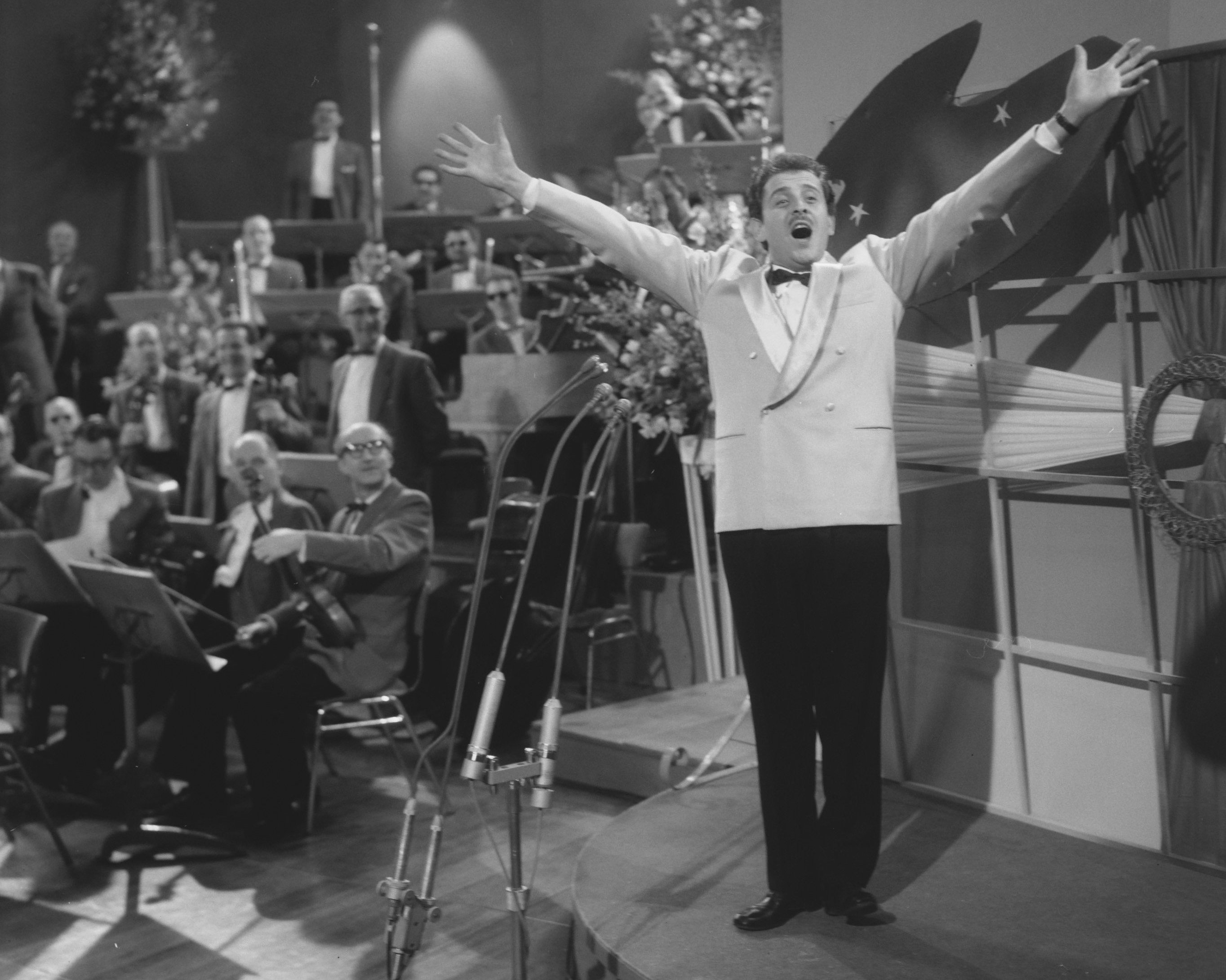
Italy's Domenico Modugno during a performance rehearsal in the contest venue

The contest was held on 12 March 1958 at 21:00 (CET), with an approximate duration of 1 hour and 10 minutes. The contest was hosted by Dutch presenter Hannie Lips. A performance by the Metropole Orkest featured as the interval act between the final competing performance and the commencement of the voting results, which included a rendition of "Cielito lindo". In addition, after the first five songs, the Metropole Orkest performed the "Wedding Dance" from the Symphonic Suite "Hasseneh" by Jacques Press as an interval act to give the juries a break to deliberate.

During the live transmission of the contest several countries were unable to see or hear the Italian entry, which was the first act to perform, due to a technical fault, and it was subsequently allowed to perform again after the last song.

The winner was France represented by the song "Dors mon amour", composed by Hubert Giraud, written by Pierre Delanoë and performed by André Claveau. This was the first of an eventual five contest victories that France would go on to achieve.

The Italian entry, "Nel blu, dipinto di blu" performed by Domenico Modugno, went on to become a worldwide success, and was one of the first Eurovision songs to achieve notability outside of the contest. Popularly known as "Volare", the song went to number one in the US Billboard Hot 100, as well as reaching the top 5 in singles charts in Belgium, Canada, the Netherlands and Norway, and the top 10 in the United Kingdom, and was named Record of the Year and Song of the Year at the first edition of the Grammy Awards held in May 1959. The song has been covered by several artists, including Dean Martin, Dalida and Gipsy Kings, and many new versions with lyrics in different languages have been produced. "Nel blu, dipinto di blu" was also nominated in 2005 to compete in Congratulations: 50 Years of the Eurovision Song Contest, a special broadcast to determine the contest's most popular entry of its first 50 years as part of the contest's anniversary celebrations. One of 14 entries chosen to compete, "Nel blu, dipinto di blu" ultimately finished in second place behind "Waterloo", ABBA's winning song from the 1974 contest.

Results of the Eurovision Song Contest 1958
R/O	Country	Artist	Song	Votes	Place
1	Italy	Domenico Modugno	"Nel blu, dipinto di blu"	13	3
2	Netherlands	Corry Brokken	"Heel de wereld"	1	9
3	France	André Claveau	"Dors mon amour"	27	1
4	Luxembourg	Solange Berry	"Un grand amour"	1	9
5	Sweden	Alice Babs	"Lilla stjärna"	10	4
6	Denmark	Raquel Rastenni	"Jeg rev et blad ud af min dagbog"	3	8
7	Belgium	Fud Leclerc	"Ma petite chatte"	8	5
8	Germany	Margot Hielscher	"Für zwei Groschen Musik"	5	7
9	Austria	Liane Augustin	"Die ganze Welt braucht Liebe"	8	5
10	Switzerland	Lys Assia	"Giorgio"	24	2

=== Spokespersons ===
Each participating broadcaster appointed a spokesperson who was responsible for announcing the votes for its respective country via telephone. Known spokespersons at the 1958 contest are listed below.

- France – Armand Lanoux
- Netherlands – Piet te Nuyl Jr.
- Sweden – Tage Danielsson

== Detailed voting results ==
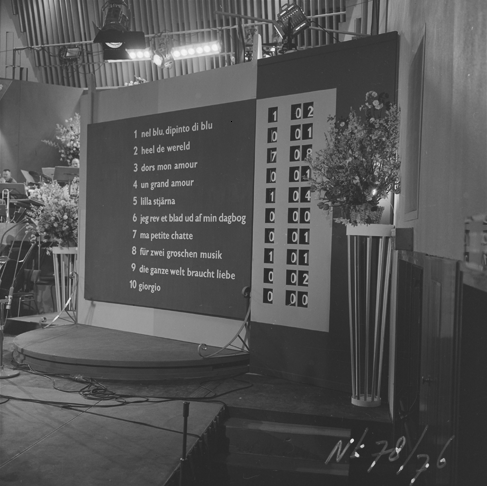
The scoreboard of the Eurovision Song Contest 1958

The announcement of the results from each country was conducted in reverse order to the order in which each country performed.

Detailed voting results of the Eurovision Song Contest 1958
		Total score	Switzerland	Austria	Germany	Belgium	Denmark	Sweden	Luxembourg	France	Netherlands	Italy
Contestants	Italy	13	1	1	4	4		1		1	1	
Contestants	Netherlands	1	1									
Contestants	France	27	1	7	1	1	9	1	1			6
Contestants	Luxembourg	1	1									
Contestants	Sweden	10	3	1		1			3		2	
Contestants	Denmark	3						1		1	1	
Contestants	Belgium	8	1		5		1	1				
Contestants	Germany	5		1		1		1		2		
Contestants	Austria	8	2			1		1	1	3		
Contestants	Switzerland	24				2		4	5	3	6	4

== Broadcasts ==
Broadcasters competing in the event were required to relay the contest via its networks; non-participating EBU member broadcasters were also able to relay the contest. Broadcasters were able to send commentators to provide coverage of the contest in their own native language and to relay information about the artists and songs to their television viewers. Known details on the broadcasts in each country, including the specific broadcasting stations and commentators are shown in the tables below.

No official accounts of the viewing figures are known to exist. In his introductory remarks, the Dutch commentator stated that a total number of "about 25 million viewers" across Europe could be estimated.

Broadcasters and commentators in participating countries
Country	Broadcaster	Channel(s)	Commentator(s)	Ref.
Austria	ORF	Österreichisches Fernsehen		
Belgium	NIR/INR	INR, Bruxelles I		
Belgium	NIR/INR	NIR		
Denmark	Statsradiofonien	Statsradiofonien TV, Program 1	Svend Pedersen	
France	RTF	RTF	Pierre Tchernia	
France	RTF	France I		
Germany	ARD	Deutsches Fernsehen	Wolf Mittler	
Italy	RAI	RAI Televisione, Secondo Programma	Bianca Maria Piccinino	
Luxembourg	CLT	Télé-Luxembourg		
Netherlands	NTS	NTS	Siebe van der Zee	
Netherlands	VARA	Hilversum 1	Siebe van der Zee	
Sweden	SR	Sveriges TV	Jan Gabrielsson	
Switzerland	SRG SSR	TV DRS, Radio Bern		
Switzerland	SRG SSR	TSR, Radio Genève	Georges Hardy	
Switzerland	SRG SSR	Radio Monte Ceneri		

Broadcasters and commentators in non-participating countries
Country	Broadcaster	Channel(s)	Commentator(s)	Ref.
Monaco	Télé Monte-Carlo			
United Kingdom	BBC	BBC Television Service (Note: Delayed broadcast on 16 March 1958 at 15:15 (GMT).)	Peter Haigh	

== Notes and references ==
=== Bibliography ===
- O'Connor, John Kennedy (2010). The Eurovision Song Contest: The Official History (2nd ed.). London, United Kingdom: Carlton Books. ISBN 978-1-84732-521-1.
- Roxburgh, Gordon (2012). Songs for Europe: The United Kingdom at the Eurovision Song Contest. Vol. One: The 1950s and 1960s. Prestatyn, United Kingdom: Telos Publishing. ISBN 978-1-84583-065-6.
- Roxburgh, Gordon (2014). "Errata". Songs for Europe: The United Kingdom at the Eurovision Song Contest. Vol. Two: The 1970s. Prestatyn, United Kingdom: Telos Publishing. pp. 368–372. ISBN 978-1-84583-065-6.
- Thorsson, Leif; Verhage, Martin (2006). Melodifestivalen genom tiderna : de svenska uttagningarna och internationella finalerna [Melodifestivalen through the ages: the Swedish selections and international finals] (in Swedish). Stockholm, Sweden: Premium Publishing. ISBN 91-89136-29-2.
