= Germany in the Eurovision Song Contest 1958 =

- Eurovision Song Contest 1958
- Participating broadcaster: ARD (Note: Arbeitsgemeinschaft der öffentlich-rechtlichen Rundfunkanstalten der Bundesrepublik Deutschland) – Nord- und Westdeutscher Rundfunkverband (NWRV)
- Country: Germany
- Selection process: Schlager 1958
- Selection date: 20 January 1958

Competing entry
- Song: "Für zwei Groschen Musik"
- Artist: Margot Hielscher
- Songwriters: Friedrich Meyer; Fred Rauch; Walter Brandin

Placement
- Final result: 7th, 5 votes

Participation chronology

Germany was represented at the Eurovision Song Contest 1958 with the song "Für zwei Groschen Musik", composed by Friedrich Meyer, with lyrics by Fred Rauch and Walter Brandin, and performed by Margot Hielscher. The German participating broadcaster on behalf of ARD, Nord- und Westdeutscher Rundfunkverband (NWRV), selected their entry through a national final. This was Hielscher's second consecutive Eurovision appearance for Germany.

== Before Eurovision ==
=== Schlager 1958 ===
The national final Schlager 1958 was held on 20 January 1958 at the Kleine Westfalenhalle in Dortmund. The final was broadcast by NWRV on Deutsches Fernsehen at 20:40 CET (19:40 UTC), with a planned duration of 80 minutes. The director was Günther Hassert. The final was hosted by Anaid Iplicjian and Kurt A. Jung. Six ARD broadcasters nominated two songs each, with the exception of host NWRV (composed by NDR and WDR), which sent three songs, making a total of eleven entries.

Competing entries
Artist	Broadcaster	Song
Lale Andersen	SWF	"Die Braut der sieben Meere"
Peter Lorenz	SWF	Unknown
Fred Bertelmann	HR	Unknown
John Paris	HR	Unknown
Gitta Lind	NDR	"Merci, mon petit"
Vico Torriani	NDR	"Etwas leise Musik"
Margret Fürer	WDR	Unknown
Erni Bieler	BR	Unknown
Margot Hielscher	BR	"Für zwei Groschen Musik"
Evelyn Künneke	SDR	Unknown
Fred Weyrich	SDR	Unknown

The names of other known singers had been circulating in the press prior to the national final, such as Alice Babs (for SDR), Lolita (for BR), Peter Norden, Georg Thomalla (for SFB), Klaus Volkmar (for SWF), and Gerhard Wendland (for HR).

A draw for the running order was executed by the artists themselves at the start of the program. The artists were accompanied by the Kölner Tanz- und Unterhaltungsorchester under the direction of Adalbert Luczkowski.

A jury composed by delegates from the ARD broadcasters decided the winner, with each broadcaster sending one juror. Each juror could distribute a maximum of ten points among their favourite entries. The final was won by Margot Hielscher with the song "Für zwei Groschen Musik", written by Friedrich Meyer, and with lyrics by Walter Brandin and Fred Rauch.

Schlager 1958 – 20 January 1958 (Note: Incomplete list of the competing entries.)
Artist	Song	Composer	Lyricist	Votes	Place
Margot Hielscher	"Für zwei Groschen Musik"	Friedrich Meyer	Walter Brandin; Fred Rauch	10	1
Vico Torriani	"Etwas leise Musik"	Franz Grothe	Willy Dehmel	9	2
Gitta Lind	"Merci, mon petit"	Martin Böttcher	Ute Just	9	2

== At Eurovision ==
On the night of the final Hielscher performed 8th in the running order, following Belgium and preceding Austria. Hielscher's performance in 1957, when she had sung into a telephone receiver, is credited as the first to introduce a visual performance element into Eurovision, and she followed this in 1958 dressed like a beauty queen proclaiming herself 'Miss Juke Box', while manoeuvring a stack of 7-inch singles in her hands as she sang. Musically, the song is inspired by American swing music. At the close of voting "Für zwei Groschen Musik" had received 5 votes, placing Germany 7th of the 10 entries. The German jury awarded 5 of its 10 votes to Belgium.

The Eurovision Song Contest 1958 was broadcast in Germany on Deutsches Fernsehen with commentary by Wolf Mittler.

=== Voting ===
Every participating broadcaster assembled a jury of ten people. Every jury member could give one vote to his or her favourite song.

Votes awarded to Germany
Score	Country
2 votes	France
1 votes	Austria; Belgium; Sweden

Votes awarded by Germany
Score	Country
5 votes	Belgium
4 votes	Italy
1 vote	France
