= Little Star (novel) =

2010 novel by John Ajvide Lindqvist

- Swedish book cover
- Author: John Ajvide Lindqvist
- Original title: Lilla stjärna
- Language: Swedish
- Genre: Horror
- Publisher: Quercus Publishing
- Publication place: Sweden

Little Star (Swedish: Lilla stjärna) is a 2010 horror/drama novel written by John Ajvide Lindqvist. It is named after Lilla stjärna, the Swedish entry to the Eurovision Song Contest 1958 held in Hilversum, the Netherlands.

The novel initially follows the life of the surrogate daughter of a musician, who kills her surrogate parents at the age of 12. The girl has a wonderful singing voice, but has trouble in starting a musical career due to her inability to engage the audience. She befriends an introverted female poet of similar age, who has similar murderous tendencies. The two girls start a wolf-themed all-female cult which orchestrates a killing spree. When the other cult members are captured, the two girls manage to flee together.

== Plot ==
In 1992, while on a walk in the woods, a musician named Lennart finds an abandoned infant left for dead. He takes her to his wife, Laila, and the two raise the child in secrecy, believing that her catatonic and trance-like state will result in her being perceived as mentally ill. Their adult son, Jerry, frequently visits the child, whom he names Theres. Lennart becomes obsessed with Theres due to her angelic voice. He convinces her never to leave the house by telling her that the world is full of "big people" who want to eat up the "little people," like her. He begins to teach her about music and states that music and love are found in the heart and in the mind.

When Theres is approximately twelve, she violently dismembers both Lennart and Laila in an attempt to find the love inside their heads. Afterwards, Jerry whisks her away to Stockholm to start a new life. He ultimately enters her in the reality show, Idol, where she dazzles the viewers with her voice, but eventually is voted off the show due to her inability to engage the audience.

In November 1992, a girl named Teresa Svensson is born. Her best childhood friend is a neighbor named Johannes. Teresa grows up to be an introverted girl, and as a teenager, begins to write poetry and post it online. Around this time, Teresa witnesses Theres' performance on Idol, and is mesmerized. Realizing that the one commenting on her poetry is the same person she saw on television, Teresa believes that their friendship was fated from the beginning, and they form a deep connection. She visits Theres' apartment every weekend, where the two compose music with Theres singing and Teresa writing the lyrics.

Meanwhile, a middle-aged talent agent named Max Hansen also catches sight of Theres during her appearance on Idol, eventually becoming infatuated with her. He contacts her with the intention of taking advantage of her voice as well as her body. Theres agrees to his offer due to wanting her own CD. In his hotel room, he attempts to perform oral sex on her, but Theres perceives this to be him trying to "eat her up" and stabs him in the back with the stem of a broken wine glass. He begins to develop a masochistic complex as a result.

Despite what happened, Theres still demands to have a CD made of her, and Hansen agrees due to the two not caring about the money or a signed legal document. They record a studio-enhanced version of their song; however, Theres and Teresa still prefer their homemade version, so they create a video of Theres lipsynching the song and post it online under the pseudonym "Tesla". The video quickly accumulates one million hits and Hansen is furious, but is unable to take legal action due to there being no legal documentation to begin with.

Soon afterwards, Teresa goes on a trip into the mountains with her family. While there, she comes across a newspaper article on the mysterious "Tesla", and becomes severely depressed knowing that no one realizes the lyrics are her work. Her parents check her into a mental institution and a while later, she is released, and returns to Theres' apartment to find her sharing their music with a number of other girls. Heartbroken, she returns home and refuses to answer any messages from Theres for some time, but the two eventually reconcile. Theres takes her to the local convenience store where Teresa murders the owner in cold blood; the "life essence" inside the man is believed to make Teresa happy.

Ultimately, Theres, Teresa and the other girls form a cult they call "The Wolves of Skansen". Together, they kidnap Max Hansen and torture him to death with a power drill: a process he takes extreme sexual delight in. They then make plans to go on a killing spree at the event Sing Along at Skansen in order to obtain life. To make sure she is ready, Teresa goes to Johannes' house and beats him to death with a hammer. She and the rest of the girls then carry out their plan while Theres sings ABBA's "Thank You for the Music" on stage. The other girls murder thirty people but are all captured, while Theres and Teresa manage to escape the vicinity. Teresa reveals that she had earlier cut a hole in the fence surrounding the wolf enclosure, hoping they would join in the massacre, but Theres takes her hand and says that they will go to the wolves instead.

== Reception ==
The Independent wrote that "The early parts of Little Star are overwritten and [Lindqvist] sacrifices plot for characterisation a tad too much. Having said that, he builds a palpable sense of terror through the alienation of his main players, and he proves with the apocalyptic ending that he's up there with the best literary horror writers."
