= Hannie Lips =

Dutch television announcer (1924–2012)

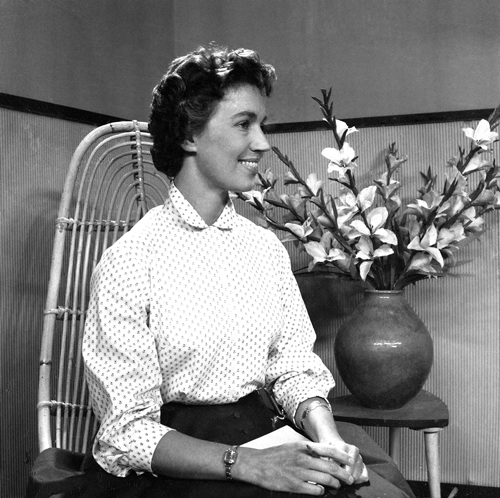
- Hannie Lips (1956)
- Born: 16 July 1924; Rotterdam, Netherlands
- Died: 19 November 2012 (aged 88); Laren, Netherlands
- Occupations: Television announcer, broadcaster
- Years active: 1948–66

Hannie Lips (16 July 1924 – 19 November 2012) was a Dutch broadcaster and television announcer of among others Dutch public broadcasting association KRO.

She is best known to international audiences for presenting the Third Eurovision Song Contest in 1958 when it was staged in Hilversum, Netherlands. In addition she hosted the Dutch National Song Contest in 1960 and 1962.

Lips died in the Netherlands at the age of 88 in her hometown Laren.

Preceded by (Germany) Anaid Iplicjian	Eurovision Song Contest presenter 1958	Succeeded by (France) Jacqueline Joubert
