= Liane Augustin =

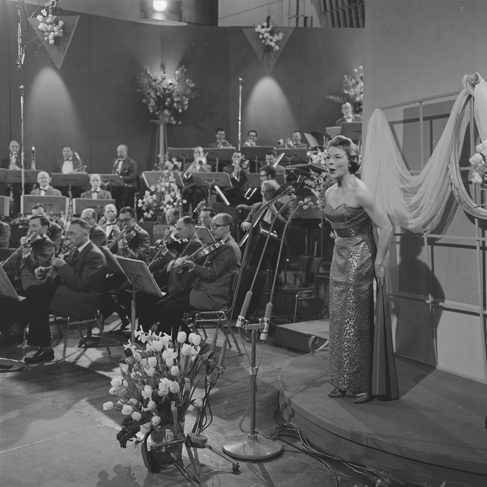
- Liane Augustin at the Eurovision Song Contest 1958

Background information
- Born: 18 November 1927; Berlin, Germany
- Died: 30 April 1978 (aged 50); Vienna, Austria

Liane Augustin (18 November 1927 – 30 April 1978) was a German-Austrian singer and actress.

== Biography ==
Liane Augustin was born in Berlin, Germany in 1927. Her postwar successes as a nightclub singer in the Viennese Boheme Bar led to numerous recordings, mostly for the Vanguard label; she was often joined by her regular accompanists, the Boheme Bar Trio, which included Michael Danzinger as pianist, Laszlo Gatti on guitar, and Willi Fantel as bassist. She also made frequent radio broadcasts and a number of international live performances.

She was chosen to represent Austria at the Eurovision Song Contest 1958 with the song "Die ganze Welt braucht Liebe" (The Whole World Needs Love). The song finished 5th out of 10 songs, and gained a total of 8 points.

She died in 1978, in Vienna, and was memorialized on 26 May 2009 as a co-namesake with Marx Augustin of the Augustinplatz in Vienna, a public square bounded by the Neustiftgasse, Kirchengasse and Kellermanngasse.

== Filmography ==
- Die Fiakermilli (1953)
- Lavender (1953)
- The Red Prince (1954)
- And Who Is Kissing Me? (1956)
- Liebe, die den Kopf verliert (1956)
- Licht auf der Piazza (1962)

== See also ==
- Eurovision Song Contest 1958
- Austria in the Eurovision Song Contest

Preceded by Bob Martin	Austria in the Eurovision Song Contest; 1958	Succeeded by Ferry Graf
