= Denmark in the Eurovision Song Contest 1958 =

- Eurovision Song Contest 1958
- Participating broadcaster: Statsradiofonien
- Country: Denmark
- Selection process: Dansk Melodi Grand Prix 1958
- Selection date: 16 February 1958

Competing entry
- Song: "Jeg rev et blad ud af min dagbog"
- Artist: Raquel Rastenni
- Songwriter: Harry Jensen

Placement
- Final result: 8th, 3 votes

Participation chronology

Denmark was represented at the Eurovision Song Contest 1958 with the song "Jeg rev et blad ud af min dagbog", written by Harry Jensen, and performed by Raquel Rastenni. The Danish participating broadcaster, Statsradiofonien, organised the Dansk Melodi Grand Prix 1958 in order to select its entry for the contest.

== Before Eurovision ==
=== Melodi Grand Prix ===
Statsradiofonien held its national final titled Melodi Grand Prix at Radiohuset in Copenhagen on 16 February 1958 at 20:15 CET (19:15 UTC). It was broadcast on Statsradiofonien Fjernsyn and also on Program 2. The program was hosted by Sejr Volmer-Sørensen. The artists were accompanied by Statsradiofonien's danseorkestret under the direction of Kai Mortensen. The winning song was chosen by a jury of ten people, and only the winning song was announced.

Melodi Grand Prix - 16 February 1958
| R/O | Artist | Song | Place |
|---|---|---|---|
| 1 | Bent Weidich | "Nanina" | —N/a |
| 2 | Raquel Rastenni | "Jeg rev et blad ud af min dagbog" | 1 |
| 3 | Birthe Wilke & Gustav Winckler | "For altid" | —N/a |
| 4 | Preben Uglebjerg | "Evas lille sang" | —N/a |
| 5 | Preben Neergaard | "Mit gamle hakkebræt" | —N/a |
| 6 | Manja Mourier | "Refræn" | —N/a |

== At Eurovision ==
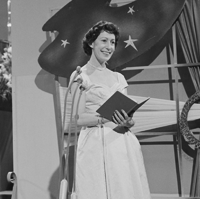
Raquel Rastenni performing at Eurovision 1958

On the contest, "Jeg rev et blad ud af min dagbog" was conducted by Kai Mortensen and performed sixth in the running order, following Sweden and preceding Belgium. At the close of voting "Jeg rev et blad ud af min dagbog" had received 3 votes, placing Denmark eighth of the 10 entries. It was succeeded as Danish entry at the 1959 contest with "Uh, jeg ville ønske jeg var dig" performed by Birthe Wilke.

The contest was televised on Statsradiofonien TV and on radio station Program 1, both with commentary by Svend Pedersen.

=== Voting ===
Every participating broadcaster assembled a jury panel of ten people. Every jury member could give one vote to his or her favourite song.

Votes awarded to Denmark
| Score | Country |
|---|---|
| 1 vote | France; Netherlands; Sweden |

Votes awarded by Denmark
| Score | Country |
|---|---|
| 9 votes | France |
| 1 vote | Belgium |
