= Anaid Iplicjian =

German actress (born 1935)

- Born: 24 October 1935 (age 89); Berlin, Germany
- Occupation: Actress
- Spouse: Herbert Kreppel

Anaid Iplicjian (born 24 October 1935) is a German actress.

== Biography ==
Iplicjian is of Armenian descent. After studying at the Mozarteum Academy in Salzburg, Austria, she was a member of the theatre companies of Graz, Wiesbaden, the State Theatre of Hanover and the Burgtheater of Vienna. A freelance actress since 1970, she has been working in Frankfurt, Hamburg, Berlin, Munich and Vienna.

She has appeared many times in German and Austrian television. She was the presenter of the Eurovision Song Contest 1957.

== Selected filmography ==
- Derrick
  - season 2, episode 6: "Paddenberg" (1975)
  - season 7, episode 10: "Eine unheimlich starke Persönlichkeit" (1980)
  - season 11, episode 1: "Das Mädchen in Jeans" (1984)

== See also ==
- List of Eurovision Song Contest presenters

| Preceded by (Switzerland) Lohengrin Filipello | Eurovision Song Contest presenter 1957 | Succeeded by (Netherlands) Hannie Lips |
