= Ulrike Hoffmann-Richter =

German psychiatrist (1958–2024)

- Born: 17 March 1958; Stuttgart, West Germany
- Died: 9 August 2024 (aged 66); Lucerne, Switzerland

Ulrike Hoffmann-Richter (17 March 1958 – 18 August 2024) was a German psychiatrist, psychotherapist and author. She built up the insurance psychiatric service of the Swiss Accident Insurance (SUVA).

== Life ==
Ulrike Hoffmann-Richter studied human medicine in Ulm and earned her doctorate on the topic of communication between doctor and patient during ward rounds. She completed training as a specialist in psychiatry and psychotherapy and further training in psychoanalysis in Cologne.

From 1990 to 1999 she worked as a senior physician at the Psychiatric University Hospital of Basel. During this time she carried out research projects on psychiatry in the print media and on suicide research. From 1999 to 2014 she worked as a psychiatrist in the SUVA's Insurance Medicine Competence Center. There she was responsible for setting up and managing their insurance psychiatric service. During this time she conducted research projects on diagnostics and therapy for mental disorders after accidents (EBEPS/OptiFAB) and on the reliability of psychiatric reports (Rely study). From 1993 she was an editor and from 2001 co-editor of the journal Psychiatrische Praxis published by Thieme Verlag. From 1994 to 2001 she was managing editor of the journal Psychotherapeutin. From 1998 she held teaching positions and worked as a lecturer at the universities of Bern, Basel and Sapienza Rome.

Since 2014, Ulrike Hoffmann-Richter had been offering psychiatric and psychotherapeutic treatments in her own practice in Lucerne in Switzerland. Her main psychotherapeutic focus was depth psychology. She specialized in assessments in the field of social insurance.

Since 2017, she worked as a specialist judge at the Cantonal Court of Lucerne.

She worked scientifically in the areas of social psychiatry, suicide research, the history of psychotherapy and psychiatry, qualitative methods and analysis of conversations and texts. An important topic for her was communication between doctor and patient, between psychiatry and the public and between medicine and law.

== Works ==
- Der Knoten im roten Faden: eine Untersuchung zur Verständigung von Arzt und Patient in der Visite. Dissertation. Bern 1985, ISBN 3-261-04034-3.
- Psychotherapie im Wandel – Von der Konfession zur Profession. Eine Auseinandersetzung mit einem bemerkenswerten Buch von Grawe K, Donati R und Bernauer F. In: Psychiatrische Praxis. 21, 1994, S. 238–242.
- Freuds Seelenapparat. Bonn 1994, ISBN 3-88414-190-2.
- With Asmus Finzen: Was ist Sozialpsychiatrie? Eine Chronik mit Texten. Bonn 1995, ISBN 3-88414-170-8.
- Das Verschwinden der Biographie in der Krankengeschichte. Eine biographische Skizze. In: BIOS. 2, 1995, S. 204–221.
- With Asmus Finzen: Das "Odium der Geisteskrankheit". Die Psychose Emilie Kempin-Spyris und ihre Deutungen. In: Psychiat Prax. 24, 1997, S. 22–27.
- With Jakob Christ: Therapie in der Gemeinschaft: Gruppenarbeit, Gruppentherapie und Gruppenpsychotherapie im psychiatrischen Alltag. Bonn 1997, ISBN 3-88414-203-8.
- Una terapia razionale per le immagini dell’anima? In: D. Armando, P. F. Nastro, F. Masini (Hrsg.): Fantasia di sparizione, formazione dell’ immagine, idea della cura. Nuove Edizione Romane Rom. 1997, S. 193–207.
- With Barbara Alder und Asmus Finzen: Die Elektrokrampftherapie und die Defibrillation in der Zeitung. Eine Medienanalyse. In: Nervenarzt. 69, 1998, S. 622–628.
- With Asmus Finzen: Die psychiatrische Krankengeschichte – eine vernachlässigte Quelle. Ueberlegungen zu einer Methodologie der Krankengeschichtenanalyse. In: BIOS. 11, 1998, S. 280–297.
- Psychiatrie in der Zeitung: Urteile und Vorurteile. Bonn 2000, ISBN 3-88414-295-X.
- With Franz Müller-Spahn: Psychiatrische Notfälle. Stuttgart 2000, ISBN 3-17-012829-9.
- Gute psychiatrische Pflege und die Zuschreibung von "Dirty Work“. Im Gespräch mit Valerie Keller, Psychiatriekrankenschwester. In: Die Psychotherapeutin. 14, 2001, S. 83–94.
- Valium als Metapher: Die therapeutische Wirkung von Valium in der Alltagsvorstellung. In: Sozialpsychiatrische Informationen. 3/2003, S. 50–56.
- Die psychiatrische Begutachtung. Eine allgemeine Einführung. Stuttgart 2005, ISBN 3-13-136331-2.
- mit Jörg Jeger und Holger Schmidt: Das Handwerk ärztlicher Begutachtung: Theorie, Methodik und Praxis. Stuttgart 2012, ISBN 978-3-17-028505-7.
- Von elektronischen Dienern. In: Psychiat Prax. 40, 2013, S. 287–291.
- With Irena Pjanic, Nadja Messerli-Bürgy, Monica Bachmann, Franziska Siegenthaler und Hansjörg Znoj: Predictors of depressed mood 12 months after injury. Contribution of self-efficacy and social support. In: Disability and rehabilitation. Band 36, Nummer 15, 2014, S. 1258–1263, doi:10.3109/09638288.2013.837971. PMID 24087898.
- With Seraphina Zurbriggen: Seelische Gesundheit und Krankheit in den Massenmedien. In: Wulf Rössler, Wolfram Kawohl: Handbuch der sozialen Psychiatrie. Band 1, Kohlhammer, Stuttgart 2013, S. 323–336.
- Psychische Beeinträchtigungen in der Rechtsprechung. Ein Blick aus psychiatrischer Sicht. In: U. Kieser (Hrsg.): Sozialversicherungsrechtstagung 2015. Dike, Zürich 2016, S. 67–94.
- With Stefan Schandelmaier, Andrea Leibold, Katrin Fischer, Ralph Mager, Monica Bachmann, Sarah Kedzia, Jason W Busse, Gordon Gyatt, Jörg Jeger, Renato Marelli, Wout EL de Boer und Regina Kunz: Attitudes towards evaluation of psychiatric disability claims: A survey of Swiss stakeholders. In: Swiss Med Wkly. 145, 2015, S. w14160
- With Laura Pielmaier: Die psychiatrisch-psychologische Begutachtung : ein Leitfaden für die Praxis. Stuttgart 2016, ISBN 978-3-17-028505-7.
- Arbeitsunfähigkeit. In: Wolfram Kawohl und Wulf Rössler (Hg.): Arbeit und Psyche. Stuttgart 2018, ISBN 9783170257627.
