= Stefan Keil =

German diplomat (1958–2021)

- Born: 20 March 1958; Regensburg, Bavaria, West Germany
- Died: 16 December 2021 (aged 63); Kingston, Jamaica
- Occupation: Diplomat
- Organizations: Consulate of Germany to Karachi; Embassy of Germany to the Russian Federation; Embassy of Germany to the Czech Republic; Consulate of Germany to Yekaterinburg; Embassy of Germany to Jamaica

Stefan Friedrich Keil (20 March 1958 – 16 December 2021) was a German diplomat. After positions in Moscow, Prague, Yekaterinburg and Donetsk, he served last as ambassador of Germany to Jamaica.

== Career ==
Born in Regensburg, he studied law from 1980, completing his first state exam in 1985, and his second in 1988. He was promoted to the doctorate in 1993. Simultaneously, he prepared for higher foreign service from 1989 to 1990, and then worked for the Ministry of Foreign Affairs in Berlin.

From 1991 to 1993, Keil was a representative at the German consulate in Karachi. He was a member of the delegation to the Geneva Disarmament Conference until 1997. He worked at the German embassy in Moscow from 2000 to 2004, where he began to learn Russian, and at the embassy in Prague from 2008 to 2011. He then represented Germany at the OECD in Paris as part of a permanent delegation. From 2015, he was Consul General in Yekaterinburg, where in one of his first appearances he dressed as Saint Nicholas at the European Christmas market. He worked towards a closer economic collaboration of the Tyumen region and Germany, in contact with governor Aleksandr Moor. From 2019, he was head of the consulate in Donetsk. On the International Holocaust Remembrance Day in January 2021, he spoke at the Ukrainian Institute for Holocaust studies, Tkuma, and at the museum for Jewish history and Holocaust in Dnipro.

Keil was the German ambassador to Jamaica from August 2021 until his death.

Keil was married and the couple had two children. On 16 December 2021, at the age of 63, he suddenly fell ill at work at the embassy in Kingston. He was taken to Andrews Memorial Hospital, and pronounced dead upon arrival.

Diplomatic posts
Preceded by Bernd von Münchow-Pohl	German Ambassador to Jamaica; 2021	Succeeded by Vacant
