= Bianca Maria Piccinino =

Italian journalist and television hostess (1924–2025)

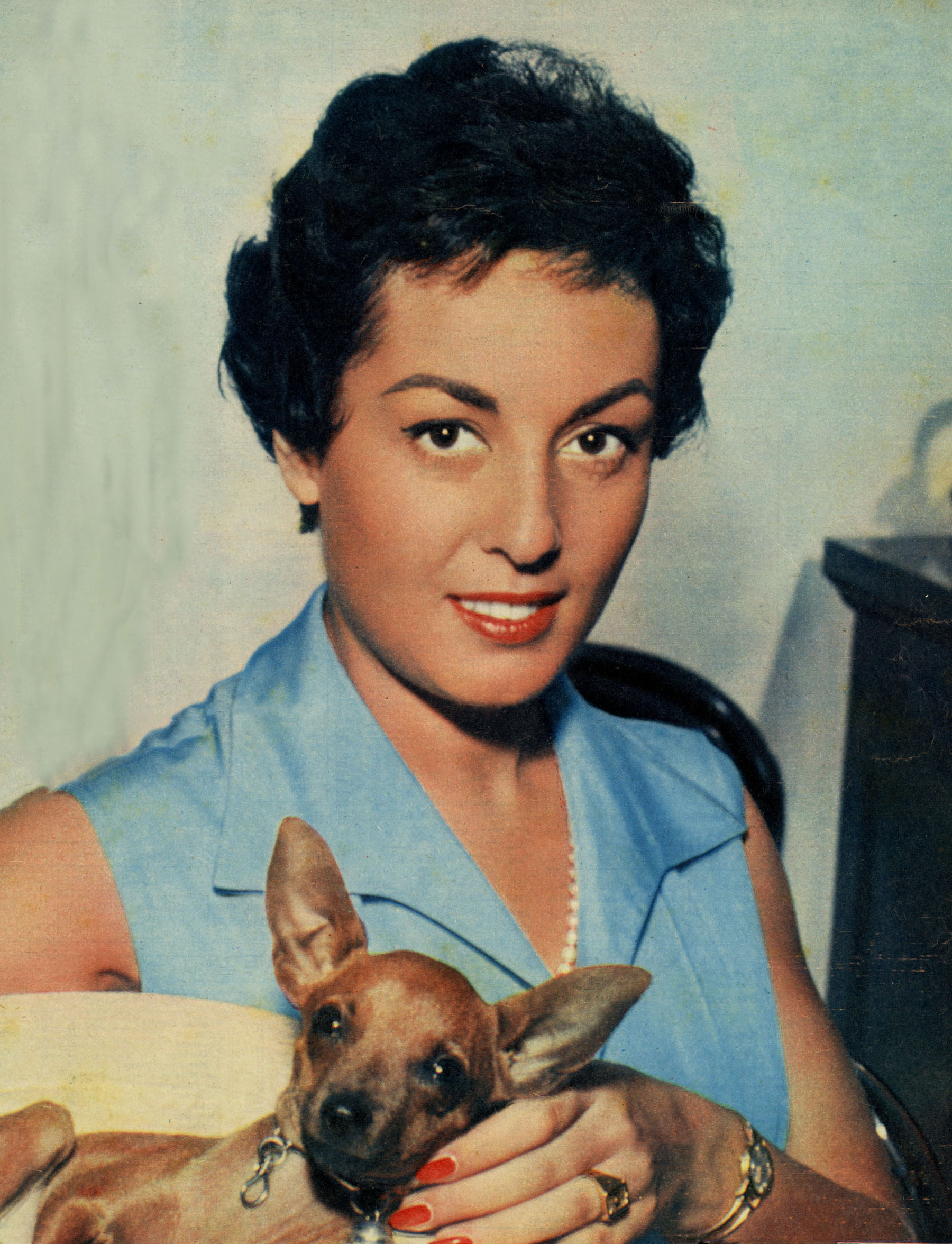
- Piccinino in 1957
- Born: 29 January 1924; Trieste, Italy
- Died: 20 July 2025 (aged 101)
- Occupation(s): Journalist, television hostess
- Years active: 1953–1989

Bianca Maria Piccinino (29 January 1924 – 20 July 2025) was an Italian journalist and television hostess. She was the first woman to conduct an Italian newscast, the 5:00 pm newscast.

== Life and career ==
Born in Trieste on 29 January 1924, Piccinino graduated with a degree in biology and joined RAI in 1953 as a television writer and presenter of popular science programmes.

In the mid-1950s she hosted the television program L'amico degli animali with Angelo Lombardi and their assistant Andalù; she also hosted the Eurovision Song Contest 1957 and 1958.

In the following years, Piccinino became responsible for fashion programmes, and in 1975 she conducted with Emilio Fede the first edition of TG1. On 29 July 1981, she presented the live broadcast of the wedding of Prince Charles and Lady Diana Spencer for Rai 1. Refusing offers by Canale 5, she stayed on Rai even after his retirement in 1989, taking care of the weekly TV magazine Moda for some years.

Piccinino also taught costume fashion at the Koefia Academy in Rome and wrote articles for magazines. She turned 100 on 29 January 2024.

Piccinino died on 20 July 2025, at the age of 101.

== Orders ==
- San Giusto d’Oro: Trieste, 12 December 2014

== Bibliography ==
- Il Radiocorriere TV, n° 31 of 1957
