= Margot Hielscher =

German singer and actress

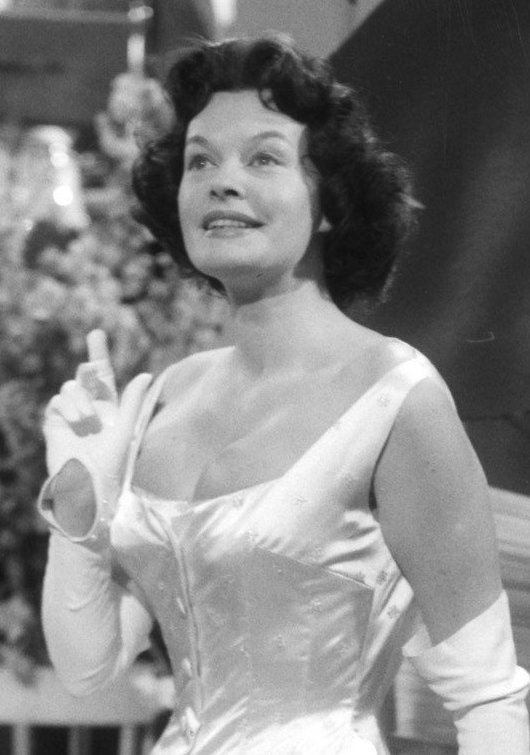
- Hielscher at the Eurovision Song Contest 1958

Background information
- Born: 29 September 1919; Berlin, Germany
- Died: 20 August 2017 (aged 97) Munich, Germany
- Occupations: Singer, actress

Margot Hielscher (29 September 1919 – 20 August 2017) was a German singer and film actress. She appeared in over fifty films between 1939 and 1994.

Hielscher was born in Berlin. In 1957, she was chosen to represent Germany at the Eurovision Song Contest 1957 with the song "Telefon, Telefon" (Telephone, Telephone). The song finished fourth out of ten, with eight points.

Hielscher was chosen again to represent Germany at the Eurovision Song Contest 1958 with the song "Für Zwei Groschen Musik" (Music For Two Pennies). The song finished seventh out of ten, with 5 points.

In 1989, she starred in the TV series Rivalen der Rennbahn. She died in Munich, aged 97.

== Awards ==
In 1978, Hielscher was awarded the "Bundesverdienstkreuz" and in 1985 the "Filmband in Gold" for her contributions to German cinema.

== Selected filmography ==
- The Heart of the Queen (1940)
- Goodbye, Franziska (1941)
- Love Premiere (1943)
- Journey into the Past (1943)
- Women Are No Angels (1943)
- The Song of the Nightingale (1944)
- Ghost in the Castle (1947)
- Hallo, Fräulein! (1949)
- The Blue Straw Hat (1949)
- Love on Ice (1950)
- Nights on the Road (1952)
- The Devil Makes Three (1952)
- Homesick for You (1952)
- Hit Parade (1953)
- Jonny Saves Nebrador (1953)
- Salto Mortale (1953)
- It Was Always So Nice With You (1954)
- The Mosquito (1954)
- Murder Party (1961)
- Black-White-Red Four Poster (1962)
- The Blood of the Walsungs (1965)
- Salto Mortale (1969, TV series)
- Die Kette (1977, TV film)
- The Magic Mountain (1982)
- Doctor Faustus (1982)

== See also ==
- Eurovision Song Contest 1957
- Eurovision Song Contest 1958
- Germany in the Eurovision Song Contest

Preceded by Freddy Quinn with So geht das jede Nacht & Walter Andreas Schwarz with Im Wartesaal zum großen Glück	Germany in the Eurovision Song Contest; 1957	Succeeded by herself with Für zwei Groschen Musik
Preceded by herself with Telefon, Telefon	Germany in the Eurovision Song Contest; 1958	Succeeded by Alice and Ellen Kessler with Heute Abend wollen wir tanzen geh'n
