= Fred Rauch =

- Born: 28 September 1909 Vienna, Austria
- Died: 1 June 1997 (aged 87) Gmund am Tegernsee, Bavaria, Germany
- Occupation: Songwriter

Fred Rauch (Vienna, 28 September 1909 – Gmund am Tegernsee, 1 June 1997) was an Austrian singer and songwriter.

He wrote the original German lyrics "Schütt die Sorgen in ein Gläschen Wein, Mütterlein" with Gerhard Winkler, which became Answer Me with English lyrics of Carl Sigman.
