= Armand Lanoux =

French writer (1913–1983)

- Born: 24 October 1913; Paris, France
- Died: 23 March 1983 (aged 69); Champs-sur-Marne, France
- Occupation: Writer

Armand Lanoux (24 October 1913 – 23 March 1983) was a French writer.

== Biography ==
Lanoux was born in Paris, France. Early in life he had several jobs: he was a teacher, designer of candy boxes, bank employee, painter and journalist.

He became an editor for the literary Artheme Fayard (1950), editor of the magazine À la page (1964), chaired the Committee on French television in 1958–1959, and was appointed Secretary General of the Radio and Television International University. He was a member of a 13-member panel that chose "Dors, mon amour" as the French Eurovision entry in 1958, where it finished first out of 10. He was a member of the France-USSR Association. He participated in drafting the Code des Usages.

Lanoux wrote in many genres: the novel, non-fiction, chronicles, drama, poetry (Apollinaire 1953 Chapman prize).

From 1957 to 1964, he spent several months a year in Saint-Jean-Cap-Ferrat. In 1963, he earned accolades in winning the Prix Goncourt for his novel Quand la mer se retire (When the tide goes out).

In 1970, he co-wrote with Marcel Cravenne Le Lys dans la vallée, directed by Marcel Cravenne, based on the novel of the same name by Honoré de Balzac. In 1980, Lanoux adapted Balzac's novel La Peau de chagrin for television, directed by Michel Favart.

Lanoux died in Champs-sur-Marne, aged 69.

The fonds of Armand Lanoux are stored at the Archives nationales à Montréal of the Bibliothèque et Archives nationales du Québec (BAnQ).

== Awards ==
- Prix du roman populiste, for La Nef des fous
- Grand Prix du roman of Société des Gens de Lettres, Les Lézards dans l'horloge
- Prix Interallié, Le Commandant Watrin
- Prix Goncourt, Quand la mer se retire

== Works ==
- La Canadienne assassinée (Colbert) 1943
- Le Pont de la folie (Colbert) 1946
- L'Affaire de l'impasse Ronsin 1947
- La Nef des fous (Amiot-Dumont/Julliard) 1948
- L'Enfant en proie aux images (Labeyrie) 1949
- La Classe du matin (Fayard) 1949
- Cet âge trop tendre (Éditions Julliard) 1951
- Colporteur (Seghers), 1953 Prix Apollinaire
- Les Lézards dans l'horloge (Julliard), 1953
- Bonjour, Monsieur Zola (Amiot-Dumont/Hachette) 1954
- Le Photographe délirant (Seghers) 1956
- Le Commandant Watrin (Julliard), 1956
- Yododo (Fayard) 1957
- Le Rendez-vous de Bruges (Julliard) 1958
- Un jeune homme en habit 1958
- La Tulipe orageuse (Seghers) 1959
- La Tête tranchée : à quoi jouent les enfants du bourreau (Julliard) 1959
- 1900, la bourgeoisie absolue (Hachette) 1961
- Quand la mer se retire (Julliard) 1963
- Le Berger des abeilles (Grasset) 1974
- La Corsetière prodigieuse (Jean-Pierre Kupczyk éditor) 1988
