= Alberto Semprini =

English pianist (1908–1990)

Alberto Semprini OBE OStJ
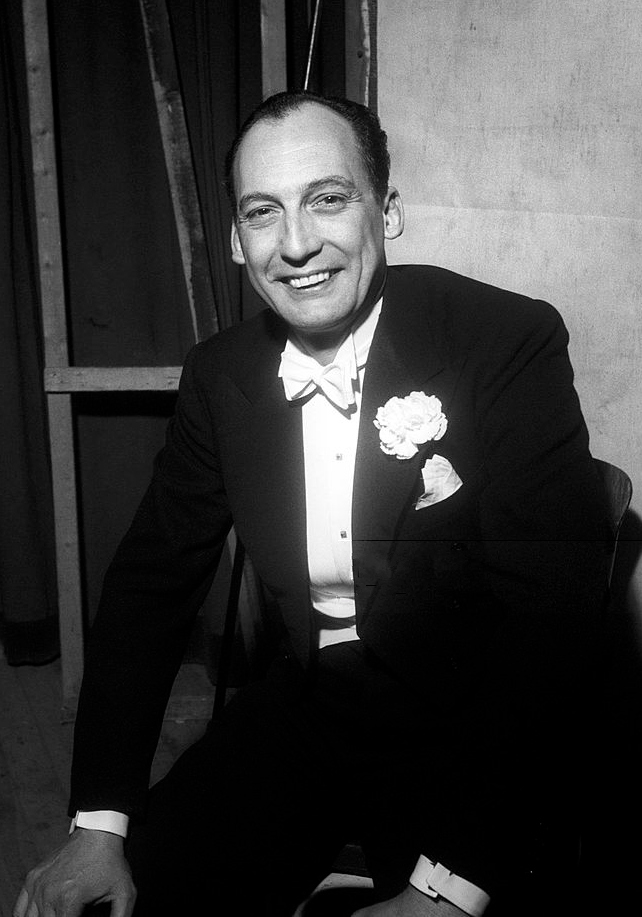
- Alberto Semprini in 1954

Background information
- Born: Alberto Fernando Riccardo Semprini; 27 March 1908; Bath, Somerset, England
- Died: 19 January 1990 (aged 81) Brixham, Devon, England
- Genres: Classical
- Occupations: Musician, composer, conductor
- Instrument: Piano

Alberto Fernando Riccardo Semprini (27 March 1908 – 19 January 1990), known as Alberto Semprini (Italian pronunciation: [alˈbɛrto semˈpriːni]), or by his stage name Semprini, was an English pianist, composer and conductor, known for his appearances on the BBC, mainly on radio.

== Early life ==
Born in Bath, Somerset, England, of Italian ancestry, Semprini showed early talent for both the piano and cello. The second of three sons, his parents were Arturo Riccardo Fernando Semprini, a musician from Rimini, Italy, and his wife, Elizabeth Tilley, an opera singer from Dudley, Worcestershire. Alberto graduated from the Verdi Conservatory in Milan in 1929, having studied composition and conducting, as well as honing his skills at the piano.

== Career ==
In Italy, he performed a broad range of music, from pop to jazz and classical, and in 1938 led his first radio orchestra there. In the late 1950s he also featured regularly at the Sanremo Music Festival.

Semprini recorded for Telefunken in the early 1940s, with a dance orchestra. During the Second World War, despite having a British passport, he was called up for military service in Italy. He was rejected as being unfit, but his passport was taken, and Semprini was suspected of being pro-British (which was true). Life in Fascist Italy became difficult for him, and he moved to Sanremo to compose. He returned to Rome in 1944 to await the arrival of the Allied Army. When they came, he volunteered his services with the Entertainments National Service Association. While working with ENSA, he met the actor Michael Brennan, who helped Semprini get his passport back. Brennan brought Semprini back to London in 1949. He was signed to His Master's Voice in 1950, for whom he recorded until 1963.

Back in the UK, he hosted a light music programme, Semprini Serenade, which he introduced with the words: "Old ones, new ones, loved ones, neglected ones". The program first aired on BBC Radio in 1957 and continued for around 25 years. Although his 'house band' was the New Abbey Light Symphony Orchestra on his commercial records, on radio he was always accompanied by one of the BBC's own staff orchestras, initially the BBC Revue Orchestra.

Semprini also wrote a number of original light music compositions, including Concerto Appassionato and Mediterranean Concerto, which he used as the theme tune for his radio show.

In 1977, following a performance in York, Semprini chose to leave the stage, citing a lack of confidence.

== Honours ==
In 1973 he was made an Officer of the Order of St John, and on 30 November 1983 he was appointed an Officer of the Order of the British Empire, in recognition of his considerable charity work.

== Personal life and death ==
In 1931, Semprini married Brunilde Regarbagnati in Italy, and the couple had three sons. However, the marriage was not to last. After the war, he worked and studied in Spain, where he fell in love with a young Spanish dancer, María de la Concepción Consuelo García Cardoso, the daughter of Generoso José García Inglesias, a house painter. Semprini took Consuelo to England in 1949, and following his divorce in 1952, married her that year. They had two sons.

He lived on a houseboat in West Mersea, Essex, and in Brixham, Devon. Semprini suffered from Alzheimer's disease, and died in Brixham on 19 January 1990, aged 81.

== Recordings ==
Semprini was a prolific recording artist. His work was first released on the Italian label Fonit Cetra, then EMI Records, where he remained for the rest of his professional career. Although strongly associated with light music, his recordings were principally of well-known classical music, including the Grieg Piano Concerto and solo pieces by Beethoven, Chopin, Liszt, Tchaikovsky and Debussy.

In 2015 Vocalion Records released a CD of his late 1950s broadcasts with the BBC Revue Orchestra, most of which had not been heard since their first broadcast.

== Cultural references ==
In the Monty Python's Flying Circus segment known as "The Chemist Sketch", the BBC interrupted the show to ban a number of "naughty" words, including "b*m", "b*tty", "kn*ckers", "kn*ckers", "p*x" and "w**-w**". The final prohibited word, a puzzling and random addition to the list, was "Semprini". Immediately when the action resumed, the chemist (John Cleese) asked, "Who's got a boil on his Semprini, then?" and was quickly taken away by a policeman (Graham Chapman). For the rest of the episode, anyone saying "Semprini" was similarly arrested.
