= Lilla stjärna =

1958 song by Alice Babs

Song by Alice Babs
- Language: Swedish
- Released: 1958
- Composer(s): Åke Gerhard
- Lyricist(s): Gunnar Wersén

Eurovision Song Contest 1958 entry
- Country: Sweden
- Artist(s): Alice Babs
- Language: Swedish
- Composer(s): Åke Gerhard
- Lyricist(s): Gunnar Wersén
- Conductor: Dolf van der Linden

Finals performance
- Final result: 4th
- Final points: 10

Entry chronology
- "Augustin" (1959) ►

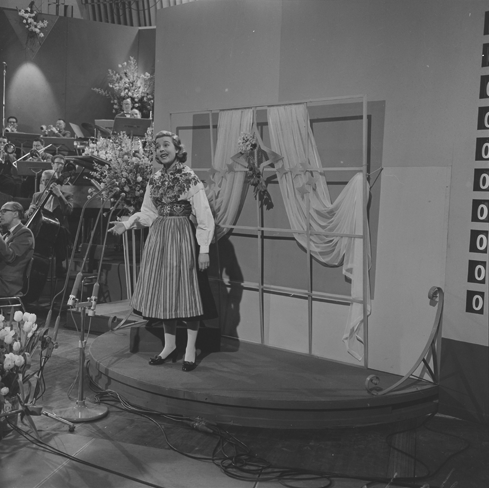
Alice Babs performing "Lilla stjärna" at Eurovision.

"Lilla stjärna" (Swedish pronunciation: [ˈlɪ̂lːa ˈɧæ̂ːɳa]; literally "Little star") is song performed by Alice Babs with music composed by Åke Gerhard and Swedish lyrics written by Gunnar Wersén. It represented Sweden in the Eurovision Song Contest 1958, held in Hilversum. It was Sweden's first song in the contest, and the first time that the Swedish language was performed in Eurovision.

== Background ==
=== Selection ===
Sveriges Radio (SR) internally selected Alice Babs as its performer for the 3rd edition of the Eurovision Song Contest, and the song "Samma stjärnor lysa för oss två" as the Swedish first entry in the contest. This was the source of some controversy between Babs and the composer of the song, Åke Gerhard; as neither she nor SR approved the lyrics and commissioned journalist and lyricist Gunnar Wersén –at the time an employee of Sveriges Radio TV– to rewrite the song as well as providing it with a new title "Lilla stjärna", without the knowledge or approval of Gerhard. As a result of this, Gerhard in turn would not allow Babs to make a studio recording of what legally still was his work, albeit in considerably rewritten form. The only existing audio recording of "Lilla stjärna" is consequently sourced from the television footage of Babs' live performance at Eurovision, which had its first commercial release as part of the Swedish CD compilation Rätt Låt Vann?! – Vinnarna in 1994.

=== Eurovision ===
On 12 March 1958, the Eurovision Song Contest was held at AVRO Studios in Hilversum hosted by Nederlandse Televisie Stichting (NTS), and broadcast live throughout the continent. Dressed in the Leksand national costume, Babs performed "Lilla stjärna" fifth in the running order on the evening, following Luxembourg's "Un grand amour" by Solange Berry and preceding Denmark's "Jeg rev et blad ud af min dagbog" by Raquel Rastenni. Dolf van der Linden conducted the live orchestra in the performance of the Swedish entry.

At the end of voting, the song received 10 points, placing fourth in a field of ten. It was succeeded as Swedish representative at the 1959 contest by "Augustin" by Brita Borg.

== Legacy ==
The name of John Ajvide Lindqvist's novel Lilla stjärna is taken from the song title.
