= Dolf van der Linden =

Dutch conductor (1915–1999)

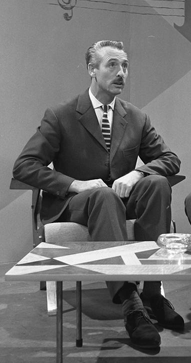
- Dolf van der Linden in 1959
- Born: David Gijsbert van der Linden; 22 June 1915; Vlaardingen, Netherlands
- Died: 30 January 1999 (aged 83); Hilversum, Netherlands
- Occupations: conductor, composer
- Years active: 1934–1995

David Gijsbert van der Linden (22 June 1915 – 30 January 1999), known as Dolf van der Linden, was a Dutch conductor of popular music. HIs reputation extended beyond the Netherlands. He was a three-time Eurovision Song Contest winning conductor.

== Early life ==
David Gijsbert van der Linden was the son of a salesman of musical instruments. He was born in Vlaardingen, near Rotterdam. Before World War II, he was a pianist in bands and arranged music for them. His colleagues started calling him "Dolf", because he reminded them of a former colleague.

== Career ==
In 1945, he was asked by Dutch authorities who had returned from exile in London to form an orchestra for light music. Picking musicians known to him from across the Netherlands, he founded the Metropole Orchestra. Artists from these early years included Benny Behr, Sem Nijveen (violinists), Kees Verschoor (clarinetist) and Manny Oets (pianist).

In 1957, van der Linden conducted the winning Dutch entry to the Eurovision Song Contest, "Net als toen", sung by Corry Brokken. In 1958, the orchestra accompanied the Eurovision Song Contest organised by Dutch TV in Hilversum. Afterwards, he was invited by the BBC to do some work. Between 1957 and 1971, van der Linden conducted 13 Dutch Eurovision entries, including winners in 1957 and 1959 ). The latter entry, "Een beetje", was written by his pianist, Dick Schallies.

In 1969 he refused to go to Spain for Eurovision, claiming that Francoist Spain reminded him too much of his experiences in World War II. Frans de Kok stepped in and conducted the winning entry, "De troubadour" by Lenny Kuhr. In the 1970 contest in Amsterdam, van der Linden was asked by RTÉ to step in and conduct "All Kinds of Everything" by Dana, another winner.

In the 1970s, Dolf van der Linden tried to rejuvenate and modernise his orchestra. In 1980, he retired, succeeded by Rogier van Otterloo. In 1995 he was awarded a Golden Harp for his outstanding achievements for entertainment music in the Netherlands; at the ceremony, he conducted the Metropole Orchestra for the last time. In 1999, van der Linden died in Hilversum.

On 22 June 2015, which would have been van der Linden's 100th birthday, the Metropole Orchestra played a concert of his compositions and arrangements. At this occasion, the first copy of van der Linden's biography, written by Bas Tukker, was presented to Dolf's younger brother Rob.

Cultural offices
Preceded by (Germany) Willy Berking	Eurovision Song Contest conductor 1958	Succeeded by (France) Franck Pourcel
Preceded by (Spain) Augusto Algueró	Eurovision Song Contest conductor 1970	Succeeded by (Republic of Ireland) Colman Pearce
