= AVRO Studios =

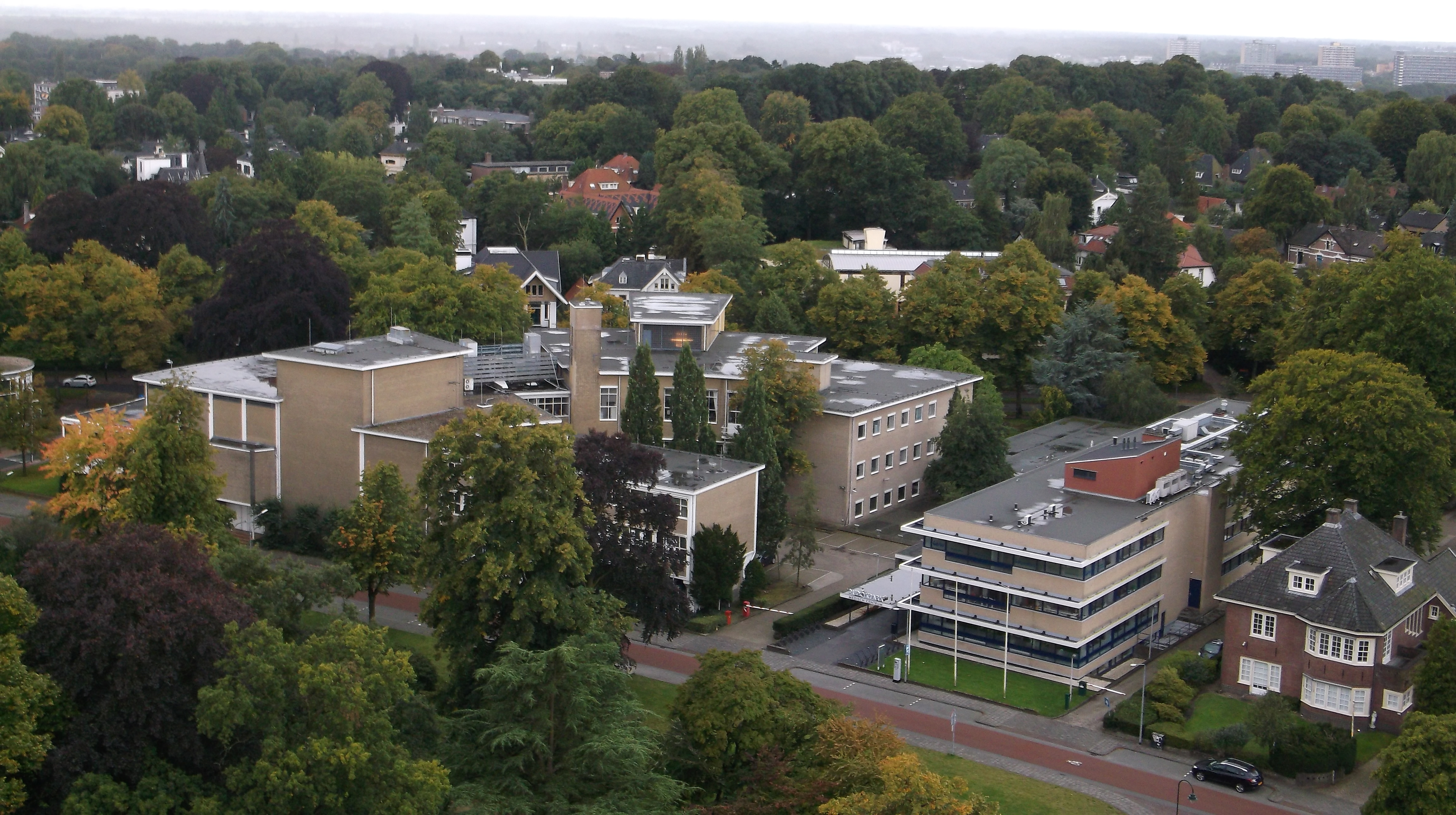
- AVRO Studio complex in September 2015
- Interactive map of the AVRO Studios area

General information
- Location: Hilversum, Netherlands
- Coordinates: 52.22786134°N 5.167861908°E
- Inaugurated: July 1936; 89 years ago

AVRO Studios is a building complex and national heritage site in Hilversum, where the radio and TV studios and the head office of the Dutch public broadcasting association AVRO (Algemene Vereniging Radio Omroep or "General Association of Radio Broadcasting") were located until 2000. The buildings have since been used by other companies for different purposes.

== History ==
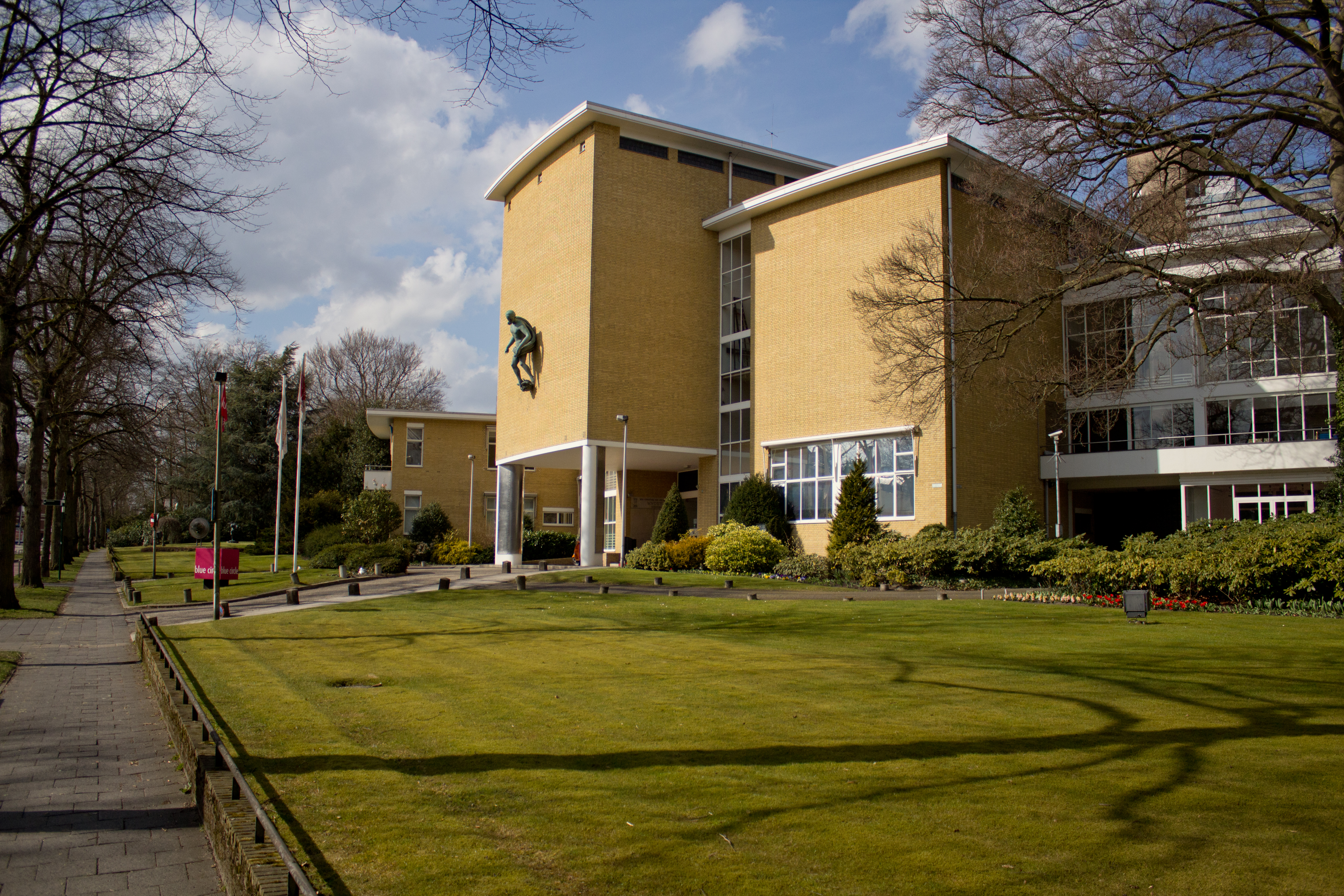
Entrance to Studio 2 of the former AVRO Studios complex in 2013

The studios were built between 1934 and 1940 according to plans by the architects Ben Merkelbach and Charles Karsten. The interior was by Alexander Bodon, who, among other things, designed the seats in the orchestra hall. The smaller studio 1 is located below studio 2, separated by Melkpad street. Studio 1 from 1936 (with an added gatehouse, coffee room and office wing from 1940) and Studio 2 from 1940 have been protected as national monuments since 2002. Both studios are connected by an underground tunnel. The last extension of the studies was carried out from 1968 to 1972 with the so-called TV-Flat and was converted into a medical center, which opened in November 2012.

Following the sale by AVRO in 2004, the television production company Blue Circle (the Dutch subsidiary of the media company FremantleMedia) resided in Studio 2 before moving to Amsterdam. In 2000, AVRO, KRO and NCRV moved into new premises, the AKN building.

In July 2002, the two studio complexes were registered as Rijksmonument (No. 522700 and No. 522701) because they are “functional buildings with an expressionist design” and “are exemplary for their construction period”. The AVRO studio complex has been recreated in miniature (scale 1 to 25) in the miniature city of Madurodam in The Hague.

== Concert organ ==
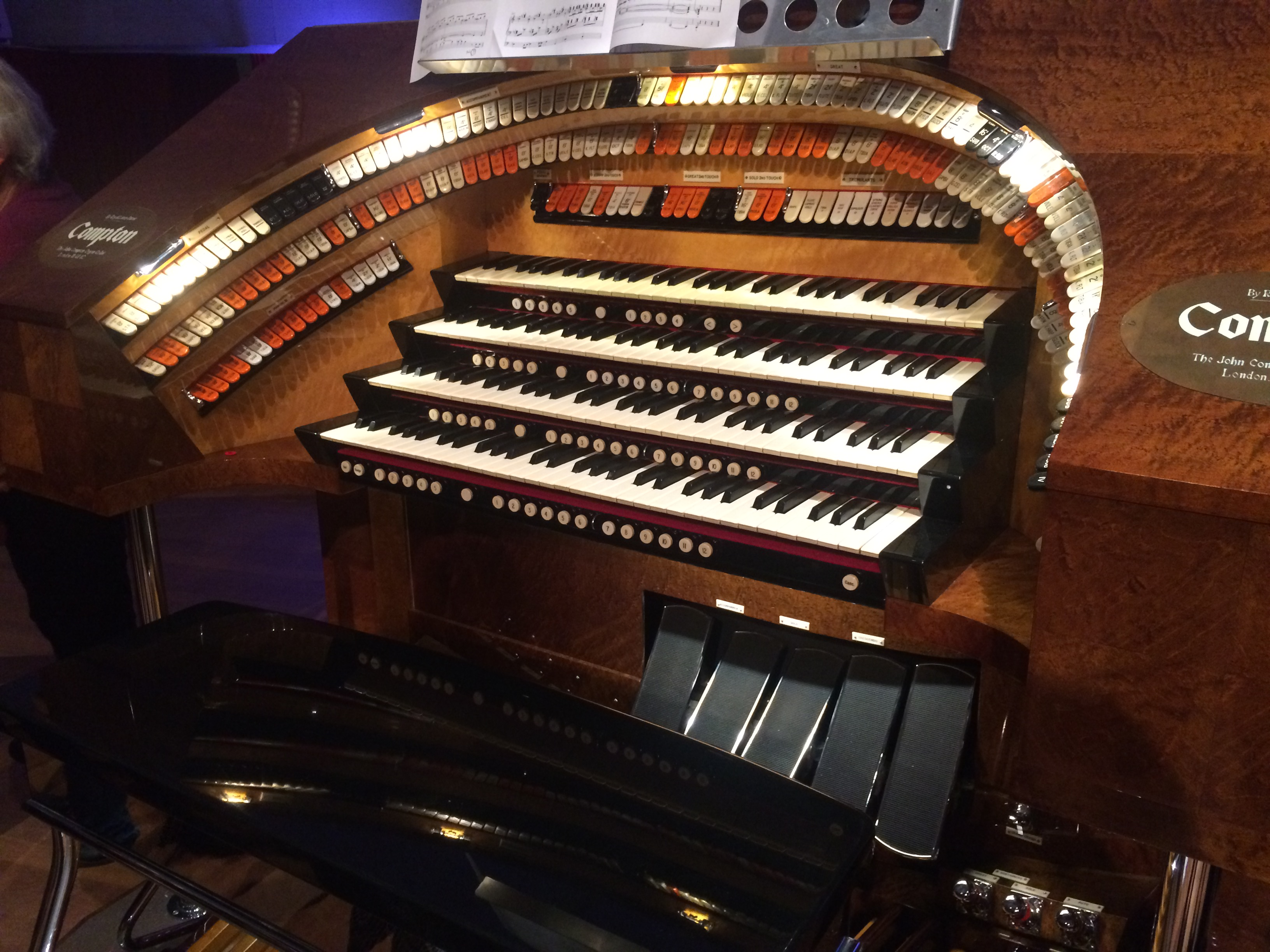
Pierre Palla Concert Organ in 2020

Studio 1 housed the original AVRO Concert Organ, which was played by solo organist Pierre Palla from 1937 until his retirement in 1967. The organ, one of the largest original theater organs in the Netherlands, was removed in 2004 after the studios were sold and was put into storage in Utrecht for the next 15 years. It was renamed in tribute after the organist in 2013 when restoration work began in 's-Hertogenbosch. It was rebuilt in 2019 and found a new home in Studio 1 of the Muziekcentrum voor de Omroep (Broadcasting Music Centre; NMBC), the former VARA studios, where a place had already been made available from the start for the Radio Concert Organ that had been bought from the BBC, which was never installed there.

After many setbacks, the AVRO Concert Organ was finally taken into use in December 2019 under the new name 'Pierre Palla Concert Organ'.

== See also ==
- List of Rijksmonuments

Preceded by Großer Sendesaal des Hessischen Rundfunks; Frankfurt	Eurovision Song Contest; Venue; 1958	Succeeded by Palais des Festivals et des Congrès; Cannes
