= Sing, Little Birdie =

1959 song by Pearl Carr & Teddy Johnson

Single by Pearl Carr & Teddy Johnson
- Recorded: London, England
- Genre: Pop
- Length: 1:50
- Label: Columbia
- Composer: Stan Butcher
- Lyricist: Syd Cordell

Pearl Carr & Teddy Johnson singles chronology
| "Sing, Little Birdie" | "How Wonderful To Know" |

Eurovision Song Contest 1959 entry
- Country: United Kingdom
- Artists: Pearl Lavinia Carr; Edward Victor Johnson
- As: Pearl Carr & Teddy Johnson
- Language: English
- Composer: Stan Butcher
- Lyricist: Syd Cordell
- Conductor: Eric Robinson

Finals performance
- Final result: 2nd
- Final points: 16

Entry chronology
- ◄ "All" (1957)
- "Looking High, High, High" (1960) ►

"Sing, Little Birdie" is a song recorded by husband-and-wife duo Pearl Carr & Teddy Johnson with music composed by Stan Butcher and English lyrics written by Syd Cordell. It represented the United Kingdom in the Eurovision Song Contest 1959 held in Cannes, placing second. It was the first British Eurovision entrant to be recorded, reaching number 12 in the UK singles chart.

== Background ==
=== Conception ===
"Sing, Little Birdie" was composed by Stan Butcher with English lyrics by Syd Cordell.

=== Selection ===
On 2 March 1959, Pearl Carr & Teddy Johnson performed "Sing, Little Birdie" in the first semi-final of the Eurovision Song Contest British Final, the national preliminary round organized by the British Broadcasting Corporation (BBC) to select its song and performer for the 4th edition of the Eurovision Song Contest. On 5 March 1959, the duo also performed in the second semi-final with the song "That's It, That's Love", making them the only act to ever perform two songs in the same multi-artist formatted British Eurovision pre-selection round; the duo also being double-entered in the British national preliminary round for the 1960 contest. Polly Brown would perform two contending songs in the British pre-selection round for the 1976 contest but as distinct acts: herself and as a member of Sweet Dreams.

"Sing, Little Birdie" was one of six songs to advance to the national final held on 7 March 1959, at the close of which "Sing, Little Birdie" was announced as the British entrant for Eurovision; the semi-final and final results for the British Finals of 1959 were determined by seven regional panels each comprising fourteen members.

=== Eurovision ===
On 11 March 1959, the Eurovision Song Contest was held at the Palais des Festivals et des Congrès in Cannes hosted by Radiodiffusion-Télévision Française (RTF) and broadcast live throughout the continent. Pearl Carr & Teddy Johnson performed "Sing, Little Birdie" tenth in a field of eleven entrants. Eric Robinson conducted the event's live orchestra in the performance of the British entry.

At the close of voting, the song finished in second place, bettered by the Netherlands' entrant "Een beetje" by Teddy Scholten.

=== Aftermath ===
Having failed to participate in the inaugural edition due to missing the entry deadline, the BBC had made a disappointing Eurovision debut in 1957 with "All" by Patricia Bredin, finishing seventh in a field of ten: no recording had been made of "All" and the BBC had not participated in 1958 contest. The second place showing of "Sing, Little Birdie" at the 1959 contest was the first evidence of the United Kingdom being a potent force at Eurovision: four subsequent British Eurovision entrants would take second place at the contest finals before it would score its first Eurovision victory in 1967 with "Puppet on a String" by Sandie Shaw.

== Legacy ==
The song was mentioned in the Monty Python's Flying Circus sketch "World Forum/Communist Quiz" in 1970 as having won the 1959 contest as the correct answer by Mao Zedong when it actually finished second.
