= Sweden in the Eurovision Song Contest 1959 =

- Eurovision Song Contest 1959
- Participating broadcaster: Sveriges Radio (SR)
- Country: Sweden
- Selection process: Artist: Internal selection Song: Säg det med musik: Stora Schlagertävlingen
- Selection date: 29 January 1959

Competing entry
- Song: "Augustin"
- Artist: Brita Borg
- Songwriters: Harry Sandin; Åke Gerhard

Placement
- Final result: 9th, 4 votes

Participation chronology

Sweden was represented at the Eurovision Song Contest 1959 with the song "Augustin", composed by Harry Sandin, with lyrics by Åke Gerhard, and performed by Brita Borg. The Swedish participating broadcaster, Sveriges Radio (SR), selected its entry through a national final, after having previously selected the performer internally.

== Before Eurovision ==
=== Säg det med musik: Stora Schlagertävlingen ===
Säg det med musik: Stora Schlagertävlingen (retroactively often referred to as Melodifestivalen 1959) was the national final for the song to represent Sweden at the Eurovision Song Contest 1959. It was held by Sveriges Radio (SR) on 29 January 1959 and was the first time that this system of picking a song was being used.

==== Format ====
Already before the national final, SR decided that Brita Borg would represent Sweden in the Eurovision Song Contest 1959. However, different artists were chosen to present the songs competing in the broadcast national selection process. Approximately 200 songs were submitted to SR for the competition. Eight semi finals were held during Thore Ehrling's radio program Säg det med musik. In each semi final, an artist performed two different songs with one of them qualifying for the national final. Östen Warnerbring was the only artist to have competed in two semi finals and hence would go on to present two songs in the national final as well.

==== Competing entries ====
There is no information on the songs that did not manage to qualify from the radio semi finals. Live recordings of all eight songs competing in the grand final have survived and the full results of the final could be reconstructed.

Artist	Song (English translation)	Composer	Lyricists
Britt Damberg	"Nya fågelsången" (The New Birdsong)	Sam Samson	Fritz-Gustaf Sundelöf
Britt-Inger Dreilick	"Hösten är vår" (Autumn Is Spring)	Gösta Westerberg	Fritz-Gustaf Sundelöf
Staffan Broms	"Dags igen att vara kära" (Time to Be in Love Again)	Ulf Källqvist	Åke Gerhard
Siw Malmkvist	"Augustin"	Bo Harry Sandin	Åke Gerhard
Ulla Christenson	"Lyckans soluppgång" (Sunrise of Happiness)	Dag Lamberth	Bengt Haslum
Åke Söhr	"En miljon för dina tankar" (A Million for Your Thoughts)	Per-Olof Flodin; Åke Gerhard	Åke Gerhard
Östen Warnerbring	"Kungsgatans blues"	Axel Flyckt	Sven-Gustaf Johnsson
Östen Warnerbring	"Någon saknar dig" (Somebody Misses You)	Britt Lindeborg	

==== Final ====
The final was broadcast on Sveriges Radio TV and Sveriges Radio P1 from Cirkus, Stockholm and the presenter was Thore Ehrling. "Augustin" was chosen by a jury of music experts. The winning title "Augustin" was written by Åke Gerhard and composed by Harry Sandin.

Final – 29 January 1959
R/O	Artist	Song	Points	Place
1	Östen Warnerbring	"Kungsgatans blues"	67	4
2	Ulla Christenson	"Lyckans soluppgång"	52	6
3	Staffan Broms	"Dags igen att vara kära"	79	2
4	Britt-Inger Dreilick	"Hösten är vår"	52	6
5	Åke Söhr	"En miljon för dina tänkar"	48	8
6	Britt Damberg	"Nya fågelsången"	76	3
7	Östen Warnerbring	"Någon saknar dig"	56	5
8	Siw Malmkvist	"Augustin"	105	1

== At Eurovision ==
On the night, "Augustin" was conducted by the host country musical director Franck Pourcel, and was interpreted by Swedish singer Brita Borg which was chosen as the representative by SR in advance, while the interpreter in the national final was Siw Malmkvist. The song was performed seventh in the running order, following Germany and preceding Switzerland. At the close of voting it had received 4 votes, placing Sweden 9th in a field of 11. The Swedish jury awarded its highest mark - 4, to Denmark.

The song was succeeded as the Swedish representative at the 1960 contest by "Alla andra får varann", performed by Siw Malmkvist, "Augustin" original interpreter.

=== Voting ===
Votes awarded to Sweden
Score	Country
3 votes	Netherlands
1 vote	Denmark

Votes awarded by Sweden
Score	Country
4 votes	Denmark
3 votes	Switzerland
2 votes	Austria
1 vote	Italy
