= Belgium in the Eurovision Song Contest 1959 =

- Eurovision Song Contest 1959
- Participating broadcaster: Nationaal Instituut voor de Radio-omroep (NIR) (Note: Nationaal Instituut voor de Radio-omroep (NIR) was the official Dutch-language name of the National Broadcasting Institute (NIR/INR).)
- Country: Belgium
- Selection process: Grote Eurovisie Prijs van het Europese Lied
- Selection date: 15 February 1959

Competing entry
- Song: "Hou toch van mij"
- Artist: Bob Benny
- Songwriters: Hans Flower; Ke Riema

Placement
- Final result: 6th, 9 votes

Participation chronology

Belgium was represented at the Eurovision Song Contest 1959 with the song "Hou toch van mij", composed by Hans Flower, with lyrics by Ke Riema, and performed by Bob Benny. The Dutch-speaking department of the Belgian participating broadcaster, the National Broadcasting Institute (NIR/INR), selected its entry through a national final.

== Before Eurovision ==
=== Grote Eurovisie Prijs van het Europese Lied ===
The National Broadcasting Institute (NIR/INR), whose official name in Dutch was Nationaal Instituut voor de Radio-omroep (NIR), delegated its participation in the Eurovision Song Contest 1959 to its Dutch-speaking department, which developed the national final format Grote Eurovisie Prijs van het Europese Lied in order to select its entry for contest. Eighteen entries competed in the competition that consisted of two semi-finals held on 1 and 8 February 1959 leading to a two-song final on 15 February 1959. All three shows were hosted by Jan Theys.

==== Format ====
The format of the competition consisted of three shows: two semi-finals on 1 and 8 February 1959 and the final on 15 February 1959. Each semi-final featured nine competing entries from which one advanced from each show to complete the two song lineup in the final. Results during both semi-finals and final were determined by a jury of music experts.

==== Competing entries ====
Nine composers were approached by NIR to create the songs for the contest. Each composer wrote two songs for the contest. Then, NIR selected performers for the songs. The selected composers were: Jef Trappeniers, Johnny Steggerda, Jef Van den Berg, Jack Say, Pieter Leemans, Armand Preud'homme, Hans Flower, Louis Marischal, and Jack Sels. It is unknown why "Alles is nu voorbij" was submitted twice.

Competing entries
Artist	Song	Songwriter(s)	
Artist	Song	Composer	Lyricist
Al Verlane	"Alles is nu voorbij"	Pieter Leemans	Eric Franssen
Al Verlane	"In d'eenzaamheid"	Jack Say	Eric Franssen
Bob Benny	"Hou toch van mij"	Hans Flower	Ke Riema
Bob Benny	"Riviera-riviera"	Hans Flower	Jan Marcken
Enny Denita	"Zingeling"	Louis Marischal	Louis Baret
Enny Denita	"Zoals heerlijk als nu (zoals nu)"	Louis Marischal	Unknown
Frieda Linzi	"Weekend melodie"	Armand Preud'homme	A. Franck
Eric Franssen	"Liefde"	Jef Van den Berg	Marc de Corte
Eric Franssen	"Twee harten, één gedachte (amore...)"	Jack Say	Eric Franssen
Jean Walter	"Alles is nu voorbij"	Pieter Leemans	Eric Franssen
Jean Walter	"Als ik je verlaat"	Armand Preud'homme	Custers
Jean Walter	"Mijn liedje is uit"	Jef Van den Berg	Marc de Corte
Jo Leemans	"Levenssymphonie"	Jef Trappeniers	Jacques Mollé
Jo Leemans	"Wij moeten dankbaar zijn"	Johnny Steggerda	
Rina Pia	"De klokkentoren"	Johnny Steggerda; Jo Dente	
Rina Pia	"Een wiegje in witte satijn"	Jef Trappeniers	Luc Verbist
Terry Lester	"Eens in het leven"	Jack Sels	Unknown
Terry Lester	"Voor u alleen"	Jack Sels	Unknown

==== Semi-finals ====
The first semi-final took place on 1 February 1959 at the Funkis Cinema in Herentals. The second semi-final took place on 8 February 1959 at the Apollo in Antwerp.

Semi-final 1 – 1 February 1959
R/O	Artist	Song	Votes	Place	Result
1	Al Verlane	"Alles is nu voorbij"	0	5	—N/a
2	Rina Pia	"De klokkentoren"	0	5	—N/a
3	Eric Franssen	"Twee harten, één gedachte (amore...)"	0	5	—N/a
4	Bob Benny	"Riviera-riviera"	1	3	—N/a
5	Jo Leemans	"Levenssymphonie"	5	1	Qualified
6	Enny Denita	"Zoals heerlijk als nu (zoals nu)"	1	3	—N/a
7	Jean Walter	"Mijn liedje is uit"	0	5	—N/a
8	Jean Walter	"Als ik je verlaat"	2	2	—N/a
9	Terry Lester	"Voor u alleen"	0	5	—N/a

Semi-final 2 – 8 February 1959
R/O	Artist	Song	Votes	Place	Result
1	Enny Denita	"Zingeling"	0	6	—N/a
2	Bob Benny	"Hou toch van mij"	4	1	Qualified
3	Jo Leemans	"Wij moeten dankbaar zijn"	0	6	—N/a
4	Al Verlane	"In d'eenzaamheid"	0	6	—N/a
5	Terry Lester	"Eens in het leven"	0	6	—N/a
6	Frieda Linzi	"Weekend melodie"	1	2	—N/a
7	Eric Franssen	"Liefde"	1	2	—N/a
8	Jean Walter	"Alles is nu voorbij"	1	2	—N/a
9	Rina Pia	"Een wiegje in witte satijn"	1	2	—N/a

==== Final ====
The final was held on 15 February 1959 at 21:25 CET as part of NIR's TV show Show Band Show at the Cultural and Artistic Center in Uccle. The song "Hou toch van mij" written by Ke Riema, composed by Hans Flower and performed by Bob Benny, was selected as the winner.

Final – 15 February 1959
R/O	Artist	Song	Votes	Place
1	Jo Leemans	"Levenssymphonie"	0	2
2	Bob Benny	"Hou toch van mij"	11	1

==== Artist selection ====
An article by Brugsch Handelsblad suggested that there might have been no guarantee that the artist who performed the winning song in the national final would be the same artist to perform the song at the Eurovision Song Contest. The article stated that Jo Leemans and Jean Walter had put themselves forward to sing the song and that Bob Benny had little chance of going to the Eurovision Song Contest, although he was eventually selected.

== At Eurovision ==
On the night of the final Bob Benny performed last in the running order, following the United Kingdom. Voting was by 10-member national juries with each member awarding 1 vote to his/her favourite song. At the close of the voting "Hou toch van mij" had received 9 votes (3 from Germany, 2 from Denmark and the United Kingdom and 1 from Monaco and the Netherlands), placing Belgium joint 6th (with Italy) of the 11 entries.

=== Voting ===
Votes awarded to Belgium
Score	Country
3 votes	Germany
2 votes	Denmark; United Kingdom
1 vote	Monaco; Netherlands

Votes awarded by Belgium
Score	Country
3 votes	Netherlands
2 votes	France; United Kingdom
1 vote	Germany; Italy; Switzerland
