= Dors, mon amour =

1958 song by André Claveau

Single by André Claveau

from the album Dors, Mon Amour
- Language: French
- B-side: "Le Coeur En Plâtre"
- Released: 1958
- Label: Pathé
- Composer: Hubert Giraud
- Lyricist: Pierre Delanoë

Eurovision Song Contest 1958 entry
- Country: France
- Artist: André Claveau
- Language: French
- Composer: Hubert Giraud
- Lyricist: Pierre Delanoë
- Conductor: Franck Pourcel

Finals performance
- Final result: 1st
- Final points: 27

Entry chronology
- ◄ "La Belle amour" (1957)
- "Oui, oui, oui, oui" (1959) ►

Official performance video
- "Dors, mon amour" on YouTube

"Dors, mon amour" (French pronunciation: [dɔʁ mɔ̃n‿amuʁ]; "Sleep, My Love") is a love song recorded by French singer André Claveau with music composed by Hubert Giraud and French lyrics written by Pierre Delanoë. It represented France in the Eurovision Song Contest 1958, held in Hilversum, resulting in the country's first win in the contest.

Described as a romantic "lullaby", the song gained several cover versions, with the original version gaining music chart achievement in Belgium and featured in another commercially successful album.

== Background ==
=== Composition ===
"Dors, mon amour" was composed by Hubert Giraud with French lyrics by Pierre Delanoë. It is a love song, expressed by the singer telling his lover to sleep, while he muses on their love and the power of the night. It is reviewed as "a classical sort of lullaby", and is compared to newer editions entries songs as "hardly indicative of the camp and bombast which would later come to define Eurovision."

=== Eurovision ===
Radiodiffusion-Télévision Française (RTF) internally selected André Claveau as its performer for the 3rd edition of the Eurovision Song Contest. On 7 February 1958, "Dors, mon amour" competed in the televised show Et voici quelques airs, the national final organised by RTF to select the song he would sing in Eurovision. "Dors, mon amour" beat four other songs and became the French entry for the contest.

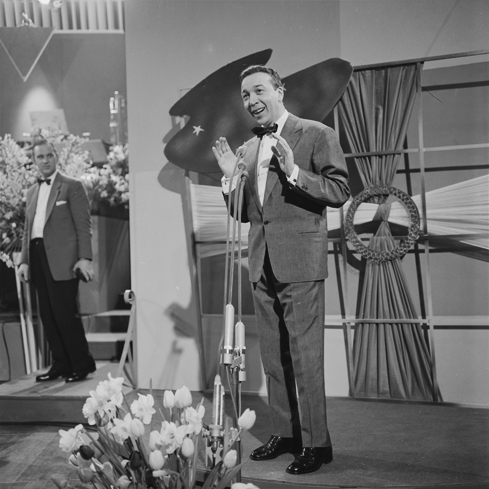
Claveau performing at Eurovision.

On 12 March 1958, the Eurovision Song Contest was held at AVRO Studios in Hilversum hosted by Nederlandse Televisie Stichting (NTS), and broadcast live throughout the continent. Claveau performed third "Dors, mon amour" in a field of ten, following the Netherlands' entry "Heel de wereld" by Corry Brokken and preceding Luxembourg's "Un grand amour" by Solange Berry. Franck Pourcel conducted the live orchestra in the performance of the French entry.

By the close of voting, it had received 27 points, placing it first, with three points above Switzerland. This is the first winning entry sung by a male leading vocalist and France's first win. The song was succeeded as French entrant at the 1959 contest by "Oui, oui, oui, oui", sung by Jean Philippe, and as contest winner by "Een beetje", sung by Teddy Scholten representing the Netherlands.

== Charts ==
"Dors, mon amour" is marked as a numberless "peak"-note position on Belgium's Walloon region single music chart for the week of 1 June 1958, and is included in the 2005 compilation "50 Years Of The Eurovision Song Contest 1956 - 1980" which charted in Switzerland.

== Legacy ==
Simultaneously to the publication of Claveau's recording, conductor Franck Pourcel published an instrumental version. The song was also covered in French in 1958, by the 1957 Eurovision winner Corry Brokken, Achille Togliani and Germana Caroli. It is covered in German by Camillo und die Bernd Hansen-Sänger as "Unser Glück, mon amour" and in Swedish by 1958 Eurovision entrant Alice Babs as "Sov min älskling".

Preceded by "Net als toen" by Corry Brokken	Eurovision Song Contest winners 1958	Succeeded by "Een beetje" by Teddy Scholten
