= Denmark in the Eurovision Song Contest 1959 =

- Eurovision Song Contest 1959
- Participating broadcaster: Danmarks Radio (DR)
- Country: Denmark
- Selection process: Dansk Melodi Grand Prix 1959
- Selection date: 12 February 1959

Competing entry
- Song: "Uh, jeg ville ønske jeg var dig"
- Artist: Birthe Wilke
- Songwriters: Otto Lington; Carl Andersen

Placement
- Final result: 5th, 12 votes

Participation chronology

Denmark was represented at the Eurovision Song Contest 1959 with the song "Uh, jeg ville ønske jeg var dig", composed by Otto Lington, with lyrics by Carl Andersen, and performed by Birthe Wilke. The Danish participating broadcaster, Danmarks Radio (DR), organised the Dansk Melodi Grand Prix 1959 in order to select its entry for the contest. Wilke had previously come third for Denmark in 1957 in a duet with Gustav Winckler, who was one of her competitors in the 1959 national final.

== Before Eurovision ==
=== Melodi Grand Prix ===
Statsradiofonien held its national final titled Melodi Grand Prix at Radiohuset in Copenhagen on 12 February 1959, at the Radiohuset in Copenhagen, hosted by Sejr Volmer-Sørensen. Two male and two female singers took part, each performing one solo song and one duet. The winning song was chosen by a 4-member jury, and only the top three songs were announced.

The winning title "Uh, jeg ville ønske jeg var dig" was written by Carl Andersen and composed by Otto Lington.

Melodi Grand Prix - 12 February 1959
R/O	Artist	Song	Place
1	Gustav Winckler	"En gang bli'r det vår"	—N/a
2	Birthe Wilke	"Uh, jeg ville ønske jeg var dig"	1
3	Grete Klitgaard and Gustav Winckler	"Alt hvad der er værd at få"	—N/a
4	Preben Uglebjerg	"Jeg er på vej til dig"	2
6	Grete Klitgaard	"Det første lille kys"	—N/a
6	Birthe Wilke and Preben Uglebjerg	"Latinersangen (Peblinge cha-cha-cha)"	3

== At Eurovision ==
On the contest, "Uh, jeg ville ønske jeg var dig" was conducted by Kai Mortensen, and Birthe Wilke performed second in the running order, following France and preceding Italy. Like most of the other songs in the contest it was somewhat old-fashioned in style with no hint of contemporary chart music, but Birthe Wilke gave an energetic and engaging performance. At the close of voting the song had received 12 votes, placing Denmark 5th of the 11 entries. The Danish jury awarded its highest mark of 4 to France. It was succeeded as Danish entry at the 1960 contest with "Det var en yndig tid" performed by Katy Bødtger.

The contest was televised on Statsradiofonien TV and on radio station Program 2, both with commentary by Sejr Volmer-Sørensen.

=== Voting ===
Votes awarded to Denmark
Score	Country
4 votes	Sweden
2 votes	Austria; United Kingdom
1 vote	Italy; Monaco; Netherlands; Switzerland

Votes awarded by Denmark
Score	Country
4 votes	France
2 votes	Belgium; Switzerland
1 votes	Sweden; United Kingdom
