= Switzerland in the Eurovision Song Contest 1959 =

- Eurovision Song Contest 1959
- Participating broadcaster: Swiss Broadcasting Corporation (SRG SSR)
- Country: Switzerland
- Selection process: Grand Prix Suisse de la Chanson Eurovision 1959
- Selection date: 22 February 1959

Competing entry
- Song: "Irgendwoher"
- Artist: Christa Williams
- Songwriter: Lothar Löffler

Placement
- Final result: 4th, 14 votes

Participation chronology

Switzerland was represented at the Eurovision Song Contest 1959 with the song "Irgendwoher", written by Lothar Löffler, and performed by Christa Williams. The Swiss participating broadcaster, the Swiss Broadcasting Corporation (SRG SSR), selected its entry through a national final after having used one previously in 1956 and 1957, but choosing to internally select in 1958.

== Before Eurovision ==
=== Grand Prix Suisse de la Chanson Eurovision 1959 ===
==== Format ====
Grand Prix Suisse de la Chanson Eurovision 1959 consisted of two semi-finals, each consisting of eight songs, and a final with nine songs. Each semi-final was voted on by a 40-member jury in Basel, Geneva, Lugano, and Zurich, which were a combination of representatives of the public and representatives from the music industry. In the final, four groups of fifteen-member juries from Basel, Lausanne, Lugano, and Zurich voted on the nine songs. The composers of the songs were kept anonymous until after the results of the final were announced.

==== Competing entries ====
The Swiss Broadcasting Corporation (SRG SSR) received 262 submissions. On 14 and 15 November 1958, a jury appointed by SRG SSR chose sixteen to compete in Grand Prix Suisse de la Chanson Eurovision 1959. Eight entries were sung in French, seven in German, and one in Italian. Among the participants was Mathé Altéry who previously represented France in 1956. Other participants include Anita Traversi, who would later represent the following year and 1964, Claude Evelyne, Dominique Rolland, and Pierre Cavalli; however, it is unknown which songs they performed in the semifinals.

Competing entries
Broadcaster	Artists		Song	Songwriter(s)		Language
Broadcaster	Semi-final	Final	Song	Composer	Lyricist	Language
TSR	Jo Roland		"Adieu Madeleine"	Hazy Osterwald	Heinz Liechti	French
TSR	Unknown	–	"Berceuse"	Unknown		French
TSR	Unknown	–	"C'est fou c'que tu ressembles à ta mère"	Unknown		French
TSR	Lucie Dolène	Mathé Altéry	"Fallait pas faire ça"	Dominique Rolland		French
TSR	Unknown	–	"Les jours sont bien trop courts pour moi"	Unknown		French
TSR	Lucie Dolène	Mathé Altéry	"Marie-toi, Marie, marie-toi"	Pierre Brenner	Roland Schweizer	French
TSR	Unknown	–	"Romance pour un chien"	Julien-François Zbinden		French
TSR	Jo Roland		"Sire le roi"	Jean-Charles Brunschwiler		French
DRS	Unknown	–	"Dein Lächeln"	Unknown		German
DRS	Unknown	Christa Williams and Jo Roland	"Die Spieldose"	Lutz G. Harteck	Alfred Lienhard	German
DRS	Unknown	Jo Roland	"Ein kleines Schiff in einer alten Branntweinflasche"	Jo Graf		German
DRS	Unknown	Christa Williams	"Irgendwoher"	Lothar Löffler		German
DRS	Unknown	–	"Kleines Sommerhaus in Ascona"	Unknown		German
DRS	Unknown	Christa Williams and Jo Roland	"Mein kleines Lied"	Georg Betz-Stahl		German
DRS	Unknown	Christa Williams	"Mit Küssen fängt die Liebe an"	W. Büttiker		German
TSI	Unknown	–	"Temporale d'estate"	Unknown		Italian

==== Semi-final 1 ====
Swiss French broadcaster Télévision suisse romande (TSR) staged the first semi-final of Grand Prix Suisse de la Chanson Eurovision 1959 on 15 December 1958 at 21:00 CET (19:00 UTC) in Geneva. It was hosted by Colette Jean and Pierre Billon. All eight French songs were performed in this semi-final. The songs that failed to qualify are "Berceuse", "C'est fou c'que tu ressembles à ta mère", "Les jours sont bien trop courts pour moi", and "Romance pour un chien", but it's unknown who performed them. Les Quatre Jeudis performed as the interval act during the voting.

Semi-final 1 - 15 December 1958
Artist	Song	Result
Jo Roland	"Adieu Madeleine"	Qualified
Jo Roland	"Sire le roi"	Qualified
Lucie Dolène	"Fallait pas faire ça"	Qualified
Lucie Dolène	"Marie-toi, Marie, marie-toi"	Qualified
Claude Evelyne	Unknown	—N/a
Claude Evelyne	Unknown	—N/a
Dominique Rolland	Unknown	—N/a
Pierre Cavalli	Unknown	—N/a

==== Semi-final 2 ====
Swiss German and Romansh broadcaster Schweizer Fernsehen der deutschen und rätoromanischen Schweiz (SF DRS) staged the second semi-final of Grand Prix Suisse de la Chanson Eurovision 1959 on 12 January 1959 at 21:00 CET (19:00 UTC) at their studios in Basel. It was hosted by Trudi Roth and Albert Werner. Seven German songs and one Italian song were performed in this semi-final. Anita Traversi, Christa Williams, and Jo Roland performed all the songs in this semi-final, with the latter two artists performing three of the songs as a duo, however it's unknown which songs they sang. Nuk the Clown performed as the interval act during the voting.

Semi-final 2 - 12 January 1959
Song	Result
"Dein Lächeln"	—N/a
"Die Spieldose"	Qualified
"Ein kleines Schiff in einer alten Branntweinflasche"	Qualified
"Irgendwoher"	Qualified
"Kleines Sommerhaus in Ascona"	—N/a
"Mein kleines Lied"	Qualified
"Mit küssen fängt die Liebe an"	Qualified
"Temporale d'estate"	—N/a

==== Final ====
TSR staged the final on 22 February 1959 at 20:45 CET (18:45 UTC) in the Théâtre de Beaulieu in Lausanne. It was presented by Claude Evelyne and Joël Curchod, and musically directed by Cédric Dumont. Dumont conducted the German-speaking songs, while Achille Scotti conducted the French songs. Les Guaranis performed as the interval acts during the voting.

The voting consisted of regional jurors from Basel, Zurich, Lugano, and Lausanne which consisted of 10 members each, who each voted their desired song. The winner was the song "Irgendwoher", written and composed by Lothar Löffler, and performed by Christa Williams. The song gained 9 points from Lugano and 5 from Zürich. Known results are listed in the chart below.

Final - 22 February 1959
R/O	Artist	Song	Total	Place
1	Jo Roland	"Ein kleines Schiff in einer alten Branntweinflasche"	Unknown	
2	Mathé Altéry	"Marie-toi, Marie, marie-toi"	13	2
3	Christa Williams	"Irgendwoher"	14	1
4	Jo Roland	"Adieu Madeleine"	10	3
5	Christa Williams and Jo Roland	"Die Spieldose"	Unknown	
6	Mathé Altéry	"Fallait pas faire ça"	Unknown	
7	Christa Williams	"Mit Küssen fängt die Liebe an"	Unknown	
8	Jo Roland	"Sire le roi"	10	3
9	Christa Williams and Jo Roland	"Mein kleines Lied"	Unknown	

=== Releases ===
Christa Williams first recorded and released "Irgendwoher" in a single titled after the song in 1959. In 1998, the song was featured in a CD compilation titled "Concours Eurovision De La Chanson 1956-1998: Schweizer Beiträge", which compiled every Swiss Eurovision entry at the time.

A cover of "Romance pour un chien" was recorded by Jo Roland, but would not be released until 2016 in an album by Radio Télévision Suisse (RTS) after his death.

== At Eurovision ==
At the Eurovision Song Contest 1959 in Cannes, the Swiss entry was the eighth entry of the night following Sweden and preceding Austria. At the close of voting, Switzerland had received fourteen votes in total; finishing in fourth place out of eleven countries. The Swiss entry was conducted at the contest by Franck Pourcel.

The contest was broadcast on SRG SSR via TV DRS and Radio Bern in German-speaking Switzerland, TSR and Radio Genève in Romandy, and TSI and Radio Monte Ceneri in Ticino.

=== Voting ===
Every participating broadcaster assembled a jury panel of ten people. Every jury member could give one vote to their favourite song.

Votes awarded to Switzerland
Score	Country
5 votes	United Kingdom
3 votes	Sweden
2 votes	Denmark
1 vote	Austria; Belgium; Germany; Monaco

Votes awarded by Switzerland
Score	Country
3 votes	Italy; United Kingdom
1 vote	France; Denmark; Germany; Austria
