= United Kingdom in the Eurovision Song Contest 1959 =

- Eurovision Song Contest 1959
- Participating broadcaster: British Broadcasting Corporation (BBC)
- Country: United Kingdom
- Selection process: Eurovision Song Contest British Final
- Selection date: 7 February 1959

Competing entry
- Song: "Sing, Little Birdie"
- Artist: Pearl Carr and Teddy Johnson
- Songwriters: Stan Butcher; Syd Cordell

Placement
- Final result: 2nd, 16 votes

Participation chronology

The United Kingdom was represented at the Eurovision Song Contest 1959 with the song "Sing, Little Birdie", composed by Stan Butcher, with lyrics by Syd Cordell, and performed by Pearl Carr and Teddy Johnson. The British participating broadcaster, the British Broadcasting Corporation (BBC), organised a national final to select its entry for the contest. The song finished in second place which at the time was the United Kingdom's best result in the competition, and remained so until their first victory in 1967.

== Before Eurovision ==
Prior to the 1959 contest, the British Broadcasting Corporation (BBC) had participated in the Eurovision Song Contest representing the United Kingdom once, in 1957, represented with the song "All" by Patricia Bredin. The song placed 7th in a field of 10 entries. The BBC declined to take part in the inaugural contest in 1956, as it had created its own contest, the Festival of British Popular Songs, aspects of which influenced the 1957 contest. The BBC initially intended to participate in 1958 but ultimately withdrew.

=== Eurovision Song Contest British Final ===
The Eurovision Song Contest British Final was a national final organised by the BBC to select its entry for the contest. The selection consisted of two semi-finals held on 2 February and 5 February 1959, and a final held on 7 February 1959, broadcast on BBC Television and presented by Pete Murray.

The songs were scored by seven 14-member regional juries representing the South of England, the Midlands, Northern England, Northern Ireland, Scotland, Wales, and the West of England.

==== Competing entries ====
Twelve entries were shortlisted by the BBC for the contest. "I'll Be With You" was originally scheduled to be performed by Alma Cogan, but was replaced by Marion Keene.

Artist	Song	Songwriter(s)
Don Rennie	"How Could I Know"	Tommy Sampson; Barbara Nelson
Glen Mason	"Suddenly"	Michael Pratt
John Hanson	"Success"	Ralph Ruvin; Harold Irving; Dick James
Lester Ferguson	"This I Will Tell My Son"	Terry Roper; Irene Roper
Lita Roza	"This Is My Town"	John S Rossiter; Harold Cornelius; Dominic John; Bob Halfin
~~Alma Cogan~~	"I'll Be With You"	Lee Lennox
Marion Keene	"I'll Be With You"	Lee Lennox
Pearl Carr and Teddy Johnson	"Sing Little Birdie"	Stan Butcher; Syd Cordell
Pearl Carr and Teddy Johnson	"That's It, That's Love"	Sam Johnson
Rosemary Squires	"Cha Cha Chocola"	Max Francis; Bill Craig
Sheila Buxton	"Love Me, Love Me"	Norman Percival
Steve Martin	"One Lonely Heart"	Peter Callander; Dick James
Valerie Shane	"Oh, Oh, Reckon I Must Be In Love"	Michael Pratt

==== Shows ====
===== Semi-final 1 =====
Semi-final 1 was held on 2 February 1959. The highlighted songs qualified for the final.

Semi-final 1 – 2 February 1959
R/O	Artist	Song	Result
1	Sheila Buxton	"Love Me, Love Me"	—N/a
2	Steve Martin	"One Lonely Heart"	Qualified
3	Pearl Carr and Teddy Johnson	"Sing, Little Birdie"	Qualified
4	Don Rennie	"How Could I Know"	—N/a
5	Glen Mason	"Suddenly"	Qualified
6	Marion Keene	"I'll Be With You"	—N/a

===== Semi-final 2 =====
Semi-final 2 was held on 5 February 1959. The highlighted songs qualified for the final.

Semi-final 2 – 5 February 1959
R/O	Artist	Song	Result
1	Pearl Carr and Teddy Johnson	"That's It, That's Love"	—N/a
2	John Hanson	"Success"	Qualified
3	Rosemary Squires	"Cha Cha Chocola"	—N/a
4	Lester Ferguson	"This I Will Tell My Son"	—N/a
5	Valerie Shane	"Oh, Oh, Reckon I Must Be In Love"	Qualified
6	Lita Roza	"This Is My Town"	Qualified

===== Final =====
The final was held on 7 February 1959 at 19:30 GMT.

Final – 7 February 1959
R/O	Artist	Song	Place
1	Valerie Shane	"Oh, Oh, Reckon I Must Be In Love"	5
2	Steve Martin	"One Lonely Heart"	4
3	Pearl Carr and Teddy Johnson	"Sing, Little Birdie"	1
4	John Hanson	"Success"	6
5	Glen Mason	"Suddenly"	3
6	Lita Roza	"This Is My Town"	2

== At Eurovision ==
In the final, Pearl Carr and Teddy Johnson performed tenth in the running order, following Austria and preceding Belgium. At the close of the voting "Sing Little Birdie" had received 16 votes, placing United Kingdom 2nd in a field of 11 entries. The British jury awarded 5 of its 10 votes to Switzerland.

=== Voting ===
Votes awarded to the United Kingdom
Score	Country
5 votes	Netherlands
3 votes	Switzerland
2 votes	Austria; Belgium; Monaco
1 vote	Denmark; France

Votes awarded by the United Kingdom
Score	Country
5 votes	Switzerland
2 votes	Belgium; Denmark
1 vote	Netherlands
