= Net als toen =

1957 song by Corry Brokken

Single by Corry Brokken
- Language: Dutch
- Released: 1957
- Label: Ronnex
- Composer: Guus Jansen
- Lyricist: Willy van Hemert

Eurovision Song Contest 1957 entry
- Country: Netherlands
- Artist: Corry Brokken
- Language: Dutch
- Composer: Guus Jansen
- Lyricist: Willy van Hemert
- Conductor: Dolf van der Linden

Finals performance
- Final result: 1st
- Final points: 31

Entry chronology
- ◄ "Voorgoed voorbij" (1956)
- "Heel de wereld" (1958) ►

Official performance video
- "Net als toen" on YouTube

"Net als toen" (Dutch pronunciation: [ˌnɛt ɑls ˈtun]; "Just like then") is a love song recorded by Dutch singer Corry Brokken with music composed by Guus Jansen and Dutch lyrics written by Willy van Hemert. It represented the Netherlands in the Eurovision Song Contest 1957 held in Frankfurt, resulting in the country's first win in the contest.

Described as a nostalgic chanson, with reminiscing lyrics and a violin-led melody, the song is about a wife who asks her husband if he remembers their early days as a couple, wishing for their romance to come back in the chorus while describing how it has gone out of the marriage in the verses.

The song had received over a third of the total-vote percentage at both the Netherlands' 1957 National Songfestival and the following edition of the annual Eurovision Song Contest, and reviews highlight its relatively high Eurovision score alongside complementing the performance's violin accompaniment while pointing out duration issues.

Brokken recorded the song in three languages alongside covers by other Eurovision entrants, and the 1957 Dutch single released by Ronnex Records gained music chart achievements in the Netherlands and Belgium, as well as featured in approximately twenty music compilations inclusive of several other commercially successful albums.

== Background ==
=== Composition ===
The song, with lyrics in Dutch by Willy van Hemert and music by Guus Jansen, is a love song with a violin dominating the song's bridge at the Eurovision Song Contest performance; described as a chanson conveying "nostalgic lyrics" and as a "lilting ballad" with a "sweeping violin solo".

Under the title which means "just like then", the song's chorus showcases how the wife reminiscent her husband's former "nice" and "gallant" behavior along with his bygone romantic gestures, such as asking her for a kiss, bringing her roses, blushing when seeing her, and complementing her "beauty" and "charm"; all of which she now pleads him to do "once more". The verses convey contrasting mental and physical aging descriptions as the present obstacles; at the first verses the wife points that the husband asks himself if she's "still alive" and "still that woman" while pointing he is "drowsy" and "tired", and at the later verses she tells him how he has changed, that he gained weight and grey hair while sometimes being "childish".

=== Eurovision ===
On 3 February 1957, "Net als toen" won the second edition of the Nationaal Songfestival, the national final organized by Nederlandse Televisie Stichting (NTS) to choose its song and performer for the second edition of the Eurovision Song Contest. The song as well as the runner-up, were performed by Corry Brokken in a field of eight entries interpreted by four singers, conducted by the Netherlands' Metropole Orchestra manager Dolf van der Linden. "Net als toen" received 40 percent of the total postcard-votes sent by the Dutch public, gaining 6,927 postcards out of overall 17,433 and a margin of more than 2,000 above the runner-up.

On 3 March 1957, the Eurovision Song Contest was held at the Großer Sendesaal des hessischen Rundfunks in Frankfurt hosted by Hessischer Rundfunk (HR) on behalf of ARD and broadcast live throughout the continent. Brokken performed "Net als toen" sixth in a field of ten countries and lasted for 4:32 minutes, interpreted by Brokken and featuring the concertmaster of the Dutch Metropole Orchestra, violinist Sem Nijveen to both accompany the singing and play the instrument solo, under the conducting of Van der Linden. It received a total of 31 points, surpassing third out of possible 90 and almost doubling the amount of 17 given to second-placed France, via a voting system in which each country distributed ten jurors' points. With each juror choosing one song from the other nine countries to be awarded with one point, France and the other eight entries didn't manage to get a score from several countries. "Net als toen" was the only song picking up points from every country, gaining several high sets of points, most notably 7 out of 10 from Switzerland as the first to vote, and kept leading the scoreboard after every voting-round.

The entry was succeeded as Dutch representative at the 1958 contest with "Heel de wereld", also sung by Brokken who this time tied for the lowest score; the only Eurovision winning performer to come last at another edition. It was succeeded as a Eurovision winner by "Dors, mon amour", sung by André Claveau representing France. In 1959 the Netherlands had already won Eurovision again, and the song's title "Net als toen", is used as a word play in a title of a Dutch newspaper article, announcing: "Again the grand price for the Netherlands, "just like then"".

== Reception ==
Prior to the contest, Dutch newspaper De Telegraaf commented that "there is optimism in regards to the verdict of the international juries" at Eurovision, and that betting odds make the song look promising to gain a top-five position. On the other hand, Dutch newspaper Algemeen Handelsblad opined that the song is disappointing and will stand "no chance" at the international field, as well as criticising procedures of the country's national selection, adding that a song on an international level for the Netherlands "can only come from a free competition".

Elsevier Weekblad said that the refrain was modeled after the French song "J'ai rendez-vous avec vous", which provoked composer Guus Jansen to open a lawsuit against the magazine because he felt accused of plagiarism.

The voting sequence for the song at Eurovision has led the contest's official website to view that the entry "never looked seriously challenged for the title". The violin accompaniment by Sem Nijveen is reviewed by website DutchNews as "sweeping" music played by a "Dutch violin favourite", and as factors which "must have helped considerably in getting a top score", adding how this achievement was enhanced by a 14-points margin over the runner-up. It is reviewed by entertainment website Screen Rant as "hardly at the same level of popularity and acclaim" as future Eurovision winners "would be", however that it's the first "to set the mark for total points"; and that although it wouldn't take long to break this record, that this song "established the tone".

The duration of the Eurovision performance is pointed by the contest's official website to be among some of the 1956 and 1957 lengthier entries which led to stress a need for a three and a half minutes limit, and from later editions to set a three-minute rule. A 2022 article of the British newspaper The Independent, which ranked the Eurovision victorious entries, placed the song close to the bottom, as number 63 out of the 68 winners, opining that it "drags on for an eye-watering five minutes" and a reason that the competition introduced the time limit.

== Releases ==
"Net als toen" was released in early 1957 as a single by Belgian music label Ronnex Records, and is featured in approximately twenty other compilation albums from 1981 to the 2020s. After the Eurovision performance, in mid-1957, it spanned several weeks on single music charts, and via several of the compilations entering album charts, gained some renewed success during sporadic years since the 1990s.

=== Recordings ===
The studio version is approximately a minute shorter than the song's Eurovision performance, with the single and album features framing it between 3:23 and 3:27 minutes. Brokken also recorded the song in French –as "Tout comme avant"– and in German –as "Damals war alles so schön"–. Other covers are the same German title for an interpretation by 1966 Eurovision entrant Margot Eskens, the Danish "Vaer som du var" by 1957 and 1959 Eurovision entrant Birthe Wilke, and the Swedish "Säg att jag drömt" by Gunnar Thim.

=== Tracks and format listing ===
- Netherlands 7-inch single / Ronnex RX 24.036
1. "Net als toen" – 3:26
2. "Wees maar niet boos"
- Netherlands 7-inch EP / A|B Ronnex EP-008
1. "Net als toen" – 3:25
2. "Hier in de stille laan"
3. "Wees maar niet boos"
4. "Als de bomen bloeien"

== Commercial performance ==
"Net als toen" charted in the Netherlands for five weeks where it remained on the same peak position, from 1 June to the week of 29 June 1957, and on Belgium's Flanders region chart it is reported to span 12 weeks, showing positions from 1 April to the week of 1 June 1957.

Among its featuring compilations, several which gained achievements on the Netherlands' album music chart: The 1998 "De grootste Nederlandstalige Songfestival hits" with a 5-week chart span and a peak position of 20, the 1994 "Net als toen - Een hommage aan een onvergetelijke zangeres" with 5 weeks and a peak of 54, the 2010 "Songfestival klassiekers Top 50" with 1 week and peak of 21, the 2013 "Grootste Hollandse Songfestival hits allertijden" with 3 weeks and peak of 22, and the 2015 "60 jaar Eurovisie Songfestival" with 1 week and peak of 26.

The song is included in two more albums with chart success in two other countries: The 2000 Eurovision songs compilation "Merci, Jury!" with 2-weeks and 9-peak in Austria, and the 2005 "50 Years Of The Eurovision Song Contest 1956 - 1980" with 3-weeks and 17-peak in Switzerland.

=== Chart history ===
==== Weekly charts ====
Chart (1957)	Peak position
Belgium (Ultratop 50 Flanders)	13
Netherlands (Single Top 100)	8

Preceded by "Refrain" by Lys Assia	Eurovision Song Contest winners 1957	Succeeded by "Dors, mon amour" by André Claveau
