= Britt Damberg =

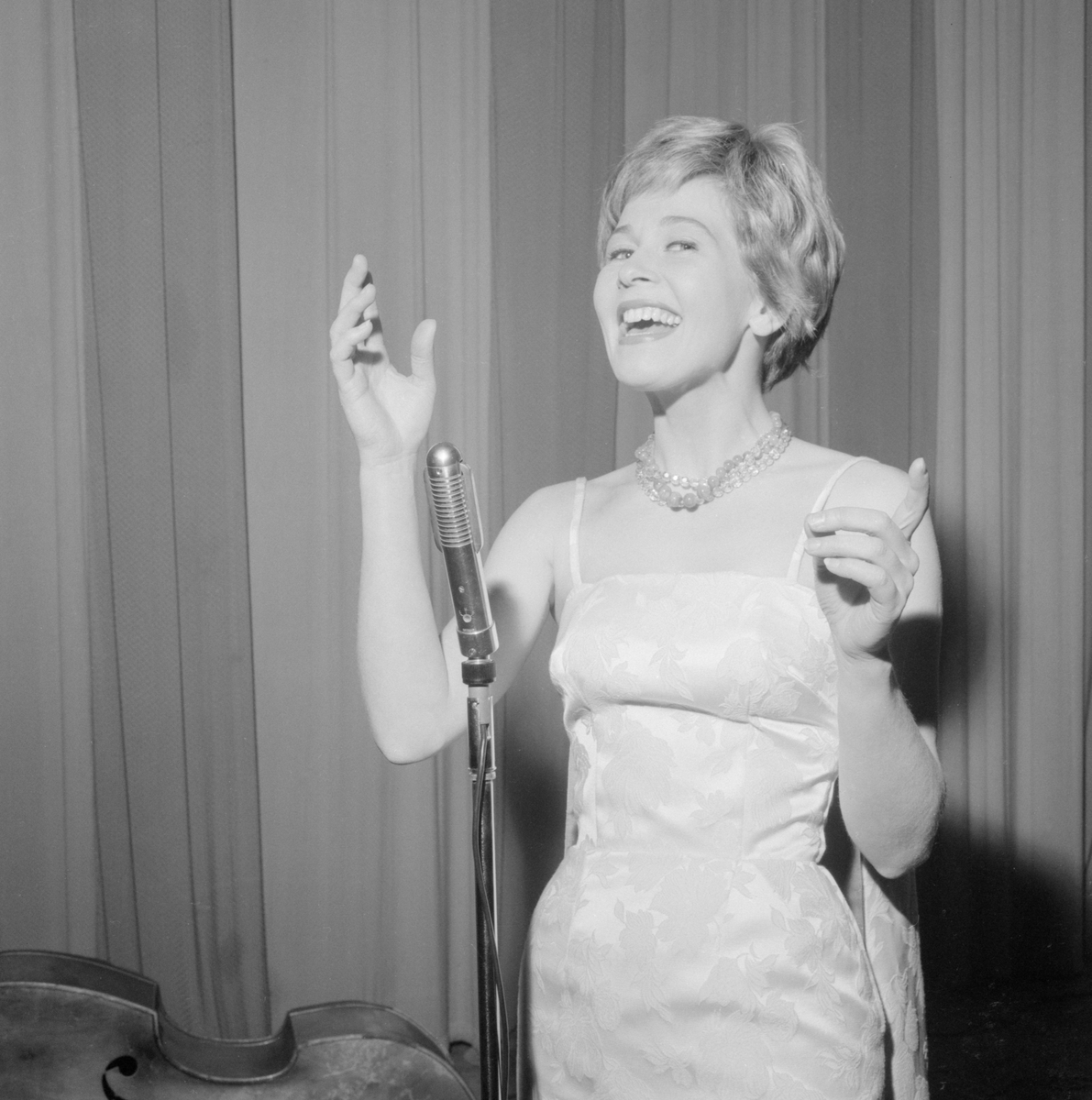

Background information
- Born: Britt Elisabet Damberg; 11 January 1937; Köping, Sweden
- Died: 31 March 2019 (aged 82)
- Genres: Schlager, Jazz
- Occupation: Singer
- Years active: 1954–1966

Britt Damberg (married Britt Elisabet Lindroth; 11 January 1937 – 31 March 2019) was a Swedish Schlager and jazz singer and occasional actress.

== Life and career ==
In 1954, Britt Damberg first entered the world of music finishing second in an amateur singing competition behind Siw Malmkvist. In 1957, she performed at Gröna Lund with Seymour Österwall. She was also a regular singer at Skansen with Leif Kronlund's orchestra and traveled to Gaza and Congo as an artist performing for the UN troops. In 1962 she had a supporting role in the Swedish film classic Raggargänget starring along, amongst others, Ernst-Hugo Järegård, Sigge Fürst, Jan-Olof Strandberg and Laila Westersund. In 1959, she had her breakthrough performing the song "Nya fågelsången" (written by Sam Samson and Fritz-Gustaf Sundelöf) at Säg det med musik: Stora Schlagertävlingen, which served as Swedish national selection for the Eurovision Song Contest 1959. Eventually, her entry finished in third place. The following year, 1960, she reached third place again, this time being one of two artists who performed the song "Nancy Nancy". Her biggest success was the song "Hälsa Mikael från mig", which reached number 9 on the Show Business magazine charts in April 1963 and also served as the title track of her first (and also last) LP released in 1966.

In the 1970s, she became a preschool teacher and left the music business. She still occasionally appeared as a jazz singer at Stampen music club in Stockholm. In 2003, she had a minor role in the Swedish short film Skala 1:1. She was married to fellow artist Björn Lindroth (1931–1999) until his Death. from 1965 and then cohabited with musician Rune Öfwerman (1932–2013) until his death.

== Discography ==
- På tal om kärlek
- Massor av kyssar – 1960
- Hälsa Mikael från mig (Single) – 1962
- Johan på Snippen-twist – 1962
- Johnny Jingo – 1962
- Kysser dom godnatt [Kiss the Boys Goodbye] – 1964
- Kärleksland [Gloryland]
- Hälsa Mikael från mig (Album) – 1966

== Filmography ==
- 1962 – Raggargänget
- 2003 – Skala 1:1
