= France in the Eurovision Song Contest 1959 =

- Eurovision Song Contest 1959
- Participating broadcaster: Radiodiffusion-Télévision Française (RTF)
- Country: France
- Selection process: Artist: Unknown; Song: Grand Prix de la Chanson
- Selection date: 28 January 1959

Competing entry
- Song: "Oui, oui, oui, oui"
- Artist: Jean Philippe
- Songwriters: Pierre Cour; Hubert Giraud

Placement
- Final result: 3rd, 15 votes

Participation chronology

France was represented at the Eurovision Song Contest 1959 with the song "Oui, oui, oui, oui", composed by Hubert Giraud, with lyrics by Pierre Cour, and performed by Jean Philippe. The French participating broadcaster, Radiodiffusion-Télévision Française (RTF), held a national final to select its entry. In addition, RTF was also the host broadcaster and staged the event at the Palais des Festivals et des Congrès in Cannes, after winning the previous edition with the song "Dors, mon amour" by André Claveau.

== Before Eurovision ==
The 1959 contest marked France's fourth appearance in the Eurovision Song Contest, having participated yearly since the first contest in 1956.

=== Grand Prix de la Chanson ===
Radiodiffusion-Télévision Française (RTF) used a format called Grand Prix de la Chanson to determine its song. Semi-final broadcasts were aired on radio France II daily (except Sundays) between 5 and 19 January 1959.

The final was held on 28 January 1959 at 21:15 (CET) and was broadcast on RTF as well as on France II and Radio Monte Carlo. (Note: Delayed broadcast on Radio Monte Carlo on 5 February at 22:06 (CET)) It took the form of a special issue of the monthly program Le magazine de la chanson, produced by Emmanuel Robert, Pierre Brive and André Salvet, and directed by Marcel Cravenne. Jacqueline Joubert, who also hosted the Eurovision Song Contest 1959, presented the show.

Eight songs took part in the final. The winning song was determined by a jury of listeners and viewers in nine different French cities.

Final – 28 January 1959
R/O	Performers	Song	Songwriter(s)	Points	Place
1	Lita Mirial	"À Santa Clara"	Marc Fontenoy; Yvon Alain	34	3
2	Guy Revaldy	"Un violon chantait"	Hubert Ithier; Maurice Méry	37	2
3	Unknown	"Tu m'as donné l'amour"	Unknown	25	4
4	Cora Vaucaire	"Souper d'adieu"	Michel Vaucaire; Rolf Marbot	22	5
5	Unknown	"Ces petits riens"	Unknown	18	6
6	Jean Philippe	"Oui, oui, oui, oui"	Pierre Cour; Hubert Giraud	77	1
7	Unknown	"Les yeux de l'amour"	Unknown	7	7
8	Juliette Gréco	"On s'embrassera"	André Popp	7	7

The selected entrant Jean Philippe performed the French entry "Oui, oui, oui, oui" for television viewers one month later, during the following edition of Le magazine de la chanson, aired on 25 February at 21:20 CET.

== At Eurovision ==
RTF hosted the Eurovision Song Contest 1959 at the Palais des Festivals et des Congrès in Cannes, on 11 March 1958. Jean Philippe sang first on the night of the contest, preceding Denmark. At the close of the voting he had received 15 votes, placing third of 11 countries.

=== Voting ===
Each participating broadcaster assembled a ten-member jury panel. Every jury member could give one vote to their favourite song.

Known members of the French jury were: Jean-Edouard Bloch (jury president), swimmer Aldo Eminente and writer Jean-François Josselin. The jury also included a former team leader at a water company, a singer, a jeweller, a painter, a dentist and an employee of the postal and telephone company PTT.

Votes awarded to France
Score	Country
4 votes	Denmark; Germany
2 votes	Belgium; Monaco
1 vote	Italy; Austria; Switzerland

Votes awarded by France
Score	Country
4 votes	Netherlands
3 votes	Italy
2 votes	Germany
1 vote	United Kingdom
