= Netherlands in the Eurovision Song Contest 1959 =

- Eurovision Song Contest 1959
- Participating broadcaster: Nederlandse Televisie Stichting (NTS)
- Country: Netherlands
- Selection process: Nationaal Songfestival 1959
- Selection date: 17 February 1959

Competing entry
- Song: "Een beetje"
- Artist: Teddy Scholten
- Songwriters: Dick Schallies; Willy van Hemert

Placement
- Final result: 1st, 21 votes

Participation chronology

The Netherlands was represented at the Eurovision Song Contest 1959 by Teddy Scholten with the song "Een beetje", composed by Dick Schallies and written by Willy van Hemert. The Dutch participating Broadcaster, Nederlandse Televisie Stichting (NTS), selected its entry through a national final. The entry eventually won the Eurovision Song Contest, making the Netherlands the first country to achieve two victories in the contest.

At the Dutch national final, held on 17 February, song and performer were chosen independently of each other. The 1957 contest winner Corry Brokken failed in her bid to represent the Netherlands for a fourth consecutive year, while future Dutch representative Greetje Kauffeld was also among those taking part.

== Before Eurovision ==
=== Nationaal Songfestival 1959 ===
Nederlandse Televisie Stichting (NTS) held the national final at the AVRO Studios in Hilversum, hosted by Karin Kraaykamp. Eight songs and seven singers were involved, with all songs presented twice by different performers, once with a full orchestra and once in a more pared-down style.

The winning song was chosen by votes from regional juries, then a jury of music experts decided which of the two performers and versions of the winning song should go to Cannes. After "Een beetje" was announced the winner, the expert jury chose Scholten with the full orchestra version of the song.

Song selection – 17 February 1959
R/O	Artist	Song	Votes	Place
1	Corry Brokken and Bruce Low	"Mijn hart en ik"	110	3
2	Greetje Kauffeld and John de Mol	"Mijn hart en ik"	110	3
3	Greetje Kauffeld	"Als ik denk aan geluk"	38	7
4	Dick Doorn	"Als ik denk aan geluk"	38	7
5	Tonny van Hulst	"Kleine zilv'ren ster"	35	8
6	Corry Brokken	"Kleine zilv'ren ster"	35	8
7	John de Mol	"Op het plein"	48	5
8	Greetje Kauffeld	"Op het plein"	48	5
9	Corry Brokken	"Iedere dag met jou"	43	6
10	Bruce Low	"Iedere dag met jou"	43	6
11	Dick Doorn	"De regen"	148	2
12	Teddy Scholten	"De regen"	148	2
13	Bruce Low	"Angelina"	53	4
14	Tonny van Hulst	"Angelina"	53	4
15	Teddy Scholten	"Een beetje"	235	1
16	John de Mol	"Een beetje"	235	1

== At Eurovision ==
On the evening of the final Scholten performed 5th in the running order, following Monaco and preceding Germany. At the close of voting "Een beetje" had received 21 votes, winning the contest by a 5-vote margin over runners-up the United Kingdom. The Netherlands thus became the first country to win Eurovision twice.

The Dutch conductor at the contest was Dolf van der Linden.

Rumours after the contest suggested that the Italian jury had awarded a very high 7 votes to "Een beetje" in order to reduce the chances of a French or British win, but these were never substantiated.

=== Voting ===
Every participating broadcaster assembled a jury panel of ten people. Each jury member could give one vote to their favourite song.

Votes awarded to the Netherlands
Score	Country
7 votes	Italy
4 votes	France
3 votes	Austria; Belgium
2 votes	Germany
1 vote	Monaco; United Kingdom

Votes awarded by the Netherlands
Score	Country
5 votes	United Kingdom
3 votes	Sweden
1 vote	Belgium; Denmark
