= Eurovision Song Contest 1959 =

International song competition

Coordinates: 43°33′12″N 7°01′20″E

Date and venue
- Final: 11 March 1959
- Venue: Palais des Festivals; Cannes, France

Organisation
- Organiser: European Broadcasting Union (EBU)

Production
- Host broadcaster: Radiodiffusion-Télévision Française (RTF)
- Producer: Marcel Cravenne
- Director: Marcel Cravenne
- Musical director: Franck Pourcel
- Presenter: Jacqueline Joubert

Participants
- Number of entries: 11
- Debuting countries: Monaco
- Returning countries: United Kingdom
- Non-returning countries: Luxembourg
- Participation map: Competing countries Countries that participated in the past but not in 1959

Vote
- Voting system: Ten-member juries in each country; each member gave one vote to their favourite song
- Winning song: Netherlands "Een beetje"

The Eurovision Song Contest 1959, originally known as the Grand Prix Eurovision 1959 de la Chanson Européenne (English: Grand Prix of the 1959 Eurovision Song Contest), was the fourth edition of the Eurovision Song Contest, held on Wednesday 11 March 1959 at the Palais des Festivals et des Congrès in Cannes, France, and presented by Jacqueline Joubert. It was organised by the European Broadcasting Union (EBU) and host broadcaster Radiodiffusion-Télévision Française (RTF), who staged the event after winning the 1958 contest for France with the song "Dors, mon amour", performed by André Claveau.

Broadcasters from eleven countries participated in the contest, with Monaco making its first appearance and the United Kingdom returning after its absence the previous year. Luxembourg, however, decided not to participate after competing in all former editions.

The winner was the Netherlands with the song "Een beetje", performed by Teddy Scholten, composed by Dick Schallies and written by Willy van Hemert. This was the Netherlands' second victory in the contest, having also won in 1957, and also marked the first time a country had won the contest more than once. Van Hemert also became the first individual to win twice, having also written the first Dutch winning song from 1957, "Net als toen". The United Kingdom, France, Switzerland and Denmark rounded out the top five, with the United Kingdom's receiving their first (of a total of sixteen) runner-up position in the competition.

== Location ==
Palais des Festivals et des Congrès, Cannes – host venue of the 1959 contest

The event took place in Cannes, France, following the nation's victory at the 1958 edition in Hilversum, Netherlands, with the song "Dors, mon amour", performed by André Claveau. The selected venue was the Palais des Festivals et des Congrès, built in 1949 to host the Cannes Film Festival and located on the Promenade de la Croisette along the shore of the Mediterranean Sea. Due to the growth in the film festival a new building bearing the same name was opened in 1982, with the original building renamed as the Palais Croisette.

This marked the second occasion in which the previous year's winning country organised the event, and the first time in which the winning country was given first choice at hosting the following year's event, as the rights to host the 1958 contest were only awarded to the Netherlands after all other countries declined.

A garden space with plants from Southern France was installed in front of the building for the contest, and the flags of the participating nations were raised on the roof. The audience comprised 1,500 invited guests.

Additional events during the contest week included a supper for the participating delegations on behalf of the city of Cannes held on the evening following the contest in the Salon des Ambassadeurs of the city's Casino municipal.

== Participants ==
Eurovision Song Contest 1959 – Participation summaries by country
- Austria; Belgium; Denmark; France; Germany; Italy; Monaco; Netherlands; Sweden; Switzerland; United Kingdom

A total of eleven countries competed in the contest, with Monaco making its first appearance and the United Kingdom returning after a one year absence. The United Kingdom's absence from the 1958 contest is generally reported to have been due to the country's poor result in 1957, but its return coincided with the international success of "Nel blu, dipinto di blu", the Italian entry from the previous year's contest, and the appointment of Eric Maschwitz as Head of Light Entertainment at the BBC. Beginning with this event the United Kingdom holds the record for the longest string of consecutive appearances in the Eurovision Song Contest, appearing in every subsequent contest final as of 2026. Luxembourg was absent from the event, having participated in all previous contests, with management at the Luxembourgish broadcaster Compagnie Luxembourgeoise de Télédiffusion (CLT) rejecting the proposed entry and leaving no sufficient time to find a replacement. This decision appears to have occurred late in the preparations for the contest as the country was listed among the participants in several radio and television listings.

Among this year's participants, two artists had previously competed in the contest. Birthe Wilke had placed third for Denmark in 1957, performing "Skibet skal sejle i nat" alongside Gustav Winckler, and Domenico Modugno had placed third for Italy in 1958 with "Nel blu, dipinto di blu".

Eurovision Song Contest 1959 participants
Country	Broadcaster	Artist	Song	Language	Songwriter(s)	Conductor
Austria	ORF	Ferry Graf	"Der K. und K. Kalypso aus Wien"	German	Günther Leopold; Norbert Pawlicki	Franck Pourcel
Belgium	NIR	Bob Benny	"Hou toch van mij"	Dutch	Hans Flower; Ke Riema	Francis Bay
Denmark	DR	Birthe Wilke	"Uh, jeg ville ønske, jeg var dig"	Danish	Carl Andersen; Otto Lington	Kai Mortensen
France	RTF	Jean Philippe	"Oui oui oui oui"	French	Pierre Cour; Hubert Giraud	Franck Pourcel
Germany	HR (Note: On behalf of the German public broadcasting consortium ARD)	Alice and Ellen Kessler	"Heut' woll'n wir tanzen geh'n"	German	Astrid Voltmann; Helmut Zander	Franck Pourcel
Italy	RAI	Domenico Modugno	"Piove"	Italian	Domenico Modugno; Dino Verde	William Galassini
Monaco	TMC	Jacques Pills	"Mon ami Pierrot"	French	Raymond Bravard; Florence Véran	Franck Pourcel
Netherlands	NTS	Teddy Scholten	"Een beetje"	Dutch	Willy van Hemert; Dick Schallies	Dolf van der Linden
Sweden	SR	Brita Borg	"Augustin"	Swedish	Åke Gerhard; Harry Sandin	Franck Pourcel
Switzerland	SRG SSR	Christa Williams	"Irgendwoher"	German	Lothar Löffler	Franck Pourcel
United Kingdom	BBC	Pearl Carr and Teddy Johnson	"Sing Little Birdie"	English	Stan Butcher; Syd Cordell	Eric Robinson

== Production and format ==
The contest was organised and broadcast by the French public broadcaster Radiodiffusion-Télévision Française (RTF), with Marcel Cravenne serving as producer and director, Gérard Dubois serving as designer, and Franck Pourcel serving as musical director and leading the Orchestre national de la RTF. Each participating delegation was allowed to nominate its own musical director to lead the orchestra during the performance of its country's entry, with the host musical director also conducting for those countries which did not nominate their own conductor.

As in the 1957 and 1958 contests, each country, participating through a single EBU member broadcaster, was represented by one song performed by up to two people on stage. The results of the event were determined through jury voting, with each country's jury containing ten individuals who each gave one vote to their favourite song, with no abstentions allowed and with jurors unable to vote for their own country. One rule change implemented for this contest specified that individuals employed in the music industry were no longer allowed to be included among the national juries.

Dubois' stage design was inspired by the era of Louis XIV. The stage featured three revolving platforms, each of which was segmented into four, similar to a revolving door, to include various backdrops. These backdrops were specific to each of the participating countries and featured scenery or objects associated with that country.

The draw to determine the running order took place on 9 March 1959. A few days prior to the contest, hotel and shop owners in Cannes complained that the contest was covered and advertised too sparsely by RTF and subsequently feared that too few tourists would come to Cannes. In contrast, the Cannes Comité des Fêtes, which was involved in the organisation of the contest, believed that the broadcast of images from Cannes to many European households would have a significant impact on tourism in the weeks to follow.

== Contest overview ==
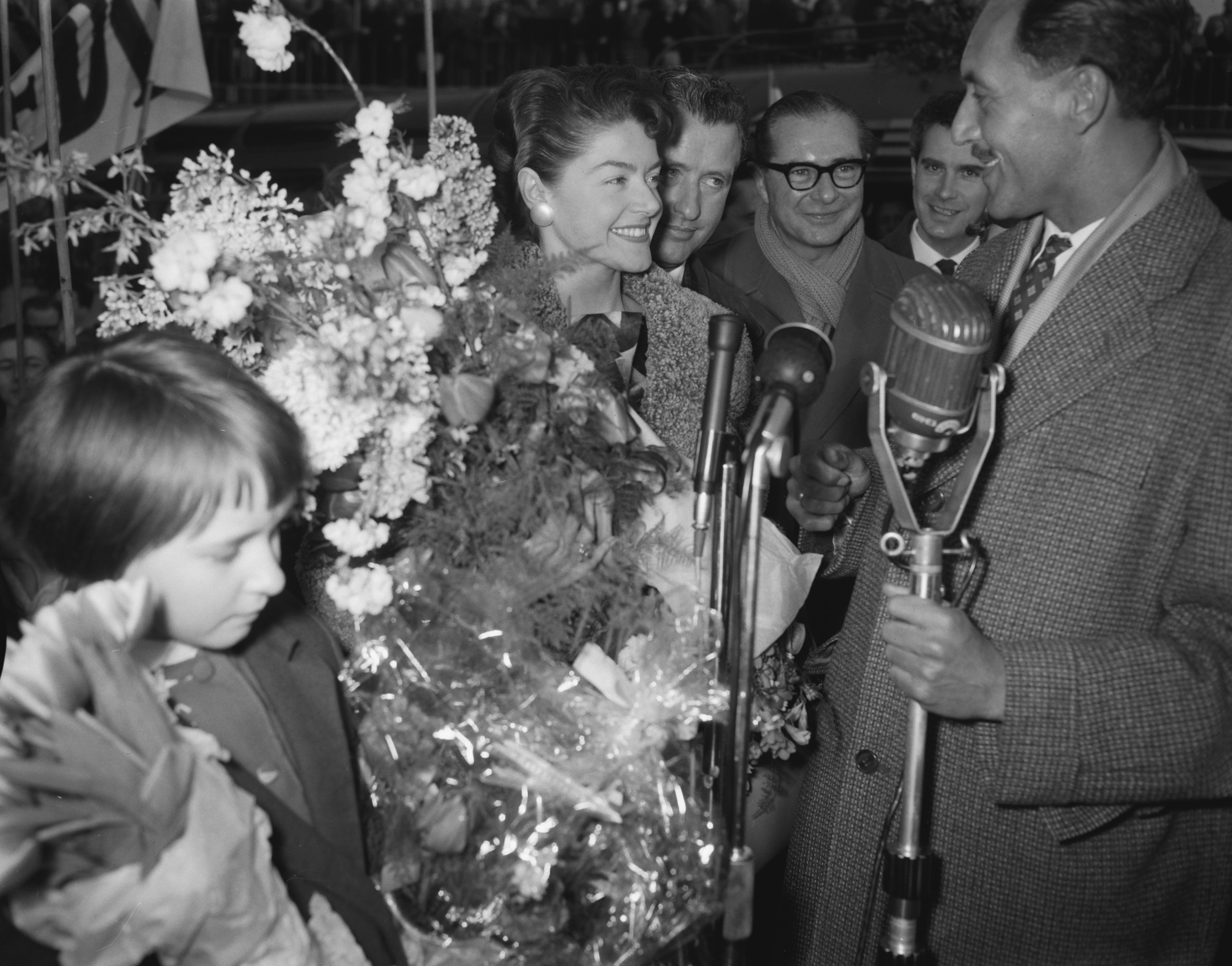
Teddy Scholten upon returning to the Netherlands following her contest win

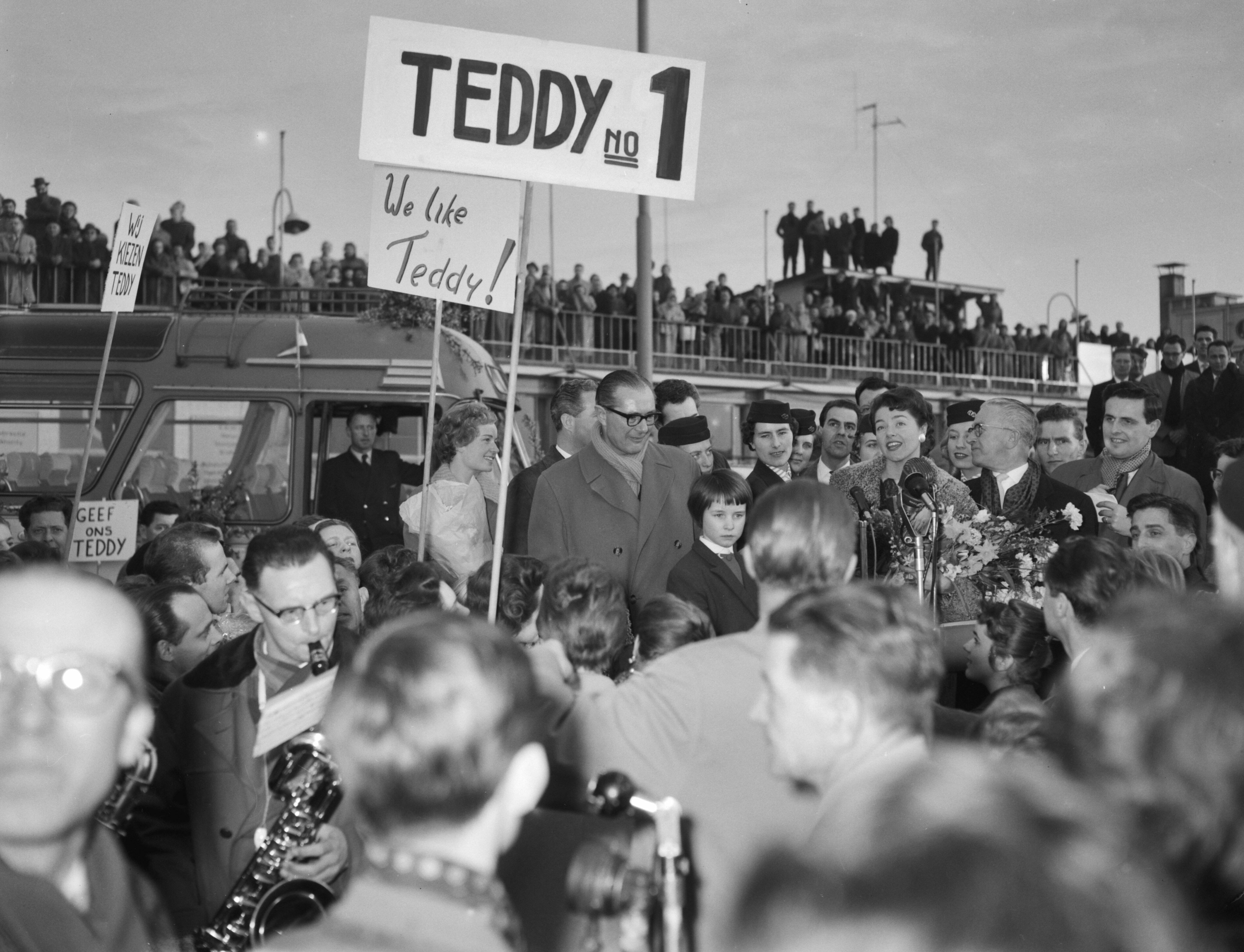
Assembled crowd at Schiphol Airport for Scholten's homecoming

The contest was held on 11 March 1959 at 21:00 (CET) and lasted 1 hour and 12 minutes. The event was hosted by French television presenter Jacqueline Joubert.

The prelude of Charpentier's "Te Deum", the theme music of Eurovision broadcasts, was played as opening act by the orchestra under the direction of Franck Pourcel.

The winner was the Netherlands represented by the song "Een beetje", composed by Dick Schallies, written by Willy van Hemert and performed by Teddy Scholten. The Netherlands became the first country to achieve two victories in the event, and Van Hemert became the first individual to win the contest twice, after previously providing lyrics for the Netherlands' winner in 1957, "Net als toen". The United Kingdom's result was the first of sixteen British entries to finish in second place, a contest record as of 2025.

Alongside the traditional reprise performance of the winning song, the second- and third-placed songs were also performed again, for the first and only time at the contest. The prize awarded to the winning songwriters, taking the form of an engraved medallion, was to be handed over during the delegations' supper following the event, but instead was presented by RTF's director of programming Jean d'Arcy to Teddy Scholten at the end of the show.

Results of the Eurovision Song Contest 1959
R/O	Country	Artist	Song	Votes	Place
1	France	Jean Philippe	"Oui oui oui oui"	15	3
2	Denmark	Birthe Wilke	"Uh, jeg ville ønske jeg var dig"	12	5
3	Italy	Domenico Modugno	"Piove"	9	6
4	Monaco	Jacques Pills	"Mon ami Pierrot"	1	11
5	Netherlands	Teddy Scholten	"Een beetje"	21	1
6	Germany	Alice and Ellen Kessler	"Heut' woll'n wir tanzen geh'n"	5	8
7	Sweden	Brita Borg	"Augustin"	4	9
8	Switzerland	Christa Williams	"Irgendwoher"	14	4
9	Austria	Ferry Graf	"Der K. und K. Kalypso aus Wien"	4	9
10	United Kingdom	Pearl Carr and Teddy Johnson	"Sing Little Birdie"	16	2
11	Belgium	Bob Benny	"Hou toch van mij"	9	6

=== Spokespersons ===
Each participating broadcaster appointed a spokesperson who was responsible for announcing the votes for its respective country via telephone. Known spokespersons at the 1959 contest are listed below.

- Netherlands – Siebe van der Zee
- Sweden – Roland Eiworth

== Detailed voting results ==
The announcement of the results from each country was conducted in reverse order to that which each country performed.

Detailed voting results of the Eurovision Song Contest 1959
		Total score	Belgium	United Kingdom	Austria	Switzerland	Sweden	Germany	Netherlands	Monaco	Italy	Denmark	France
Contestants	France	15	2		1	1		4		2	1	4	
Contestants	Denmark	12		2	2	1	4		1	1	1		
Contestants	Italy	9	1			3	1			1			3
Contestants	Monaco	1			1								
Contestants	Netherlands	21	3	1	3			2		1	7		4
Contestants	Germany	5	1			1					1		2
Contestants	Sweden	4							3			1	
Contestants	Switzerland	14	1	5	1		3	1		1		2	
Contestants	Austria	4				1	2			1			
Contestants	United Kingdom	16	2		2	3			5	2		1	1
Contestants	Belgium	9		2				3	1	1		2	

== Broadcasts ==
Each participating broadcaster was required to relay the contest via its television network. No official accounts of the viewing figures are known to exist. An estimate given in the press was at least 20 million viewers.

Broadcasters were able to send commentators to provide coverage of the contest in their own native language and to relay information about the artists and songs to their television viewers. Twelve commentator boxes were installed on the balconies of the auditorium. Known details on the broadcasts in each country, including the specific broadcasting stations and commentators are shown in the table below.

Broadcasters and commentators in participating countries
Country	Broadcaster	Channel(s)	Commentator(s)	Ref.
Austria	ORF	ORF		
Belgium	NIR/INR	NIR	Paula Sémer	
Belgium	NIR/INR	INR	Paule Herreman	
Denmark	DR	Danmarks Radio TV, Program 2	Sejr Volmer-Sørensen	
France	RTF	RTF	Claude Darget	
France	RTF	France II		
Germany	ARD	Deutsches Fernsehen	Elena Gerhardt	
Italy	RAI	RAI Televisione, Secondo Programma	Renato Tagliani	
Monaco	Radio Monte-Carlo (Note: Deferred broadcast at 22:06 (CET))			
Netherlands	NTS	NTS	Piet te Nuyl Jr.	
Netherlands	VARA	Hilversum 1 (Note: Deferred broadcast at 22:00 (CET))	Aad Bos	
Netherlands	RNW (Note: Delayed broadcast in a shortened format on 14 March 1959 at 14:55 (CET))			
Sweden	SR	Sveriges TV, SR P1	Jan Gabrielsson	
Switzerland	SRG SSR	TV DRS, Radio Bern		
Switzerland	SRG SSR	TSR, Radio Genève		
Switzerland	SRG SSR	TSI, Radio Monte Ceneri		
United Kingdom	BBC	BBC Television Service	Tom Sloan	

Broadcasters and commentators in non-participating countries
Country	Broadcaster	Channel(s)	Commentator(s)	Ref.
Luxembourg	CLT	Télé-Luxembourg		

== Notes and references ==
=== Bibliography ===
- O'Connor, John Kennedy (2010). The Eurovision Song Contest: The Official History (2nd ed.). London, United Kingdom: Carlton Books. ISBN 978-1-84732-521-1.
- Roxburgh, Gordon (2012). Songs for Europe: The United Kingdom at the Eurovision Song Contest. Vol. One: The 1950s and 1960s. Prestatyn, United Kingdom: Telos Publishing. ISBN 978-1-84583-065-6.
- Thorsson, Leif; Verhage, Martin (2006). Melodifestivalen genom tiderna : de svenska uttagningarna och internationella finalerna [Melodifestivalen through the ages: the Swedish selections and international finals] (in Swedish). Stockholm, Sweden: Premium Publishing. ISBN 91-89136-29-2.
