= Christa Williams =

German singer

Christa Williams (born: Christa Bojarzin 5 February 1926 – 28 or 29 July 2012) was a German pop singer most popular in the late 1950s and early 1960s.

Williams was chosen to represent Switzerland at the Eurovision Song Contest 1959 with the song "Irgendwoher" (From Somewhere). The song finished fourth out of 11 songs, and gained a total of 14 points.

== Selected filmography ==
- At the Green Cockatoo by Night (1957)
- The Legs of Dolores (1957)
- Every Day Isn't Sunday (1959)
- Pension Schöller (1960)
- I Learned That in Paris (1960)

== See also ==
- Eurovision Song Contest 1959
- Switzerland in the Eurovision Song Contest

Awards and achievements
Preceded by Lys Assia with "Giorgio"	Switzerland in the Eurovision Song Contest; 1959	Succeeded by Anita Traversi with "Cielo e terra"
