= Germany in the Eurovision Song Contest 1959 =

- Eurovision Song Contest 1959
- Participating broadcaster: ARD (Note: Arbeitsgemeinschaft der öffentlich-rechtlichen Rundfunkanstalten der Bundesrepublik Deutschland) – Hessischer Rundfunk (HR)
- Country: Germany
- Selection process: Internal selection

Competing entry
- Song: "Heute abend woll'n wir tanzen geh'n"
- Artist: Alice and Ellen Kessler
- Songwriters: Helmut Zander; Astrid Voltmann

Placement
- Final result: 8th, 5 votes

Participation chronology

Germany was represented at the Eurovision Song Contest 1959 with the song "Heute abend woll'n wir tanzen geh'n", composed by Helmut Zander, with lyrics by Astrid Voltmann, and performed by Alice and Ellen Kessler. The German participating broadcaster on behalf of ARD, Hessischer Rundfunk (HR), internally selected the song and artists for the contest.

== Before Eurovision ==
The German national broadcaster ARD internally selected Alice and Ellen Kessler as its representatives to the Eurovision Song Contest 1959. They also selected the song "Heute möchte ich bummeln" which went through several rewrites of the lyrics and a title change at the Kessler twins' request.

== At Eurovision ==
On the night of the final, the Kessler twins performed 6th in the running order, after the Netherlands and before Sweden. Their performance included a small dance number in the middle of the song. After voting closed, "Heute abend woll'n wir tanzen geh'n" had received 5 votes, placing 8th out of 11 entries.

=== Voting ===
Every participating broadcaster assembled a jury of ten people. Every jury member could give one vote to their favourite song. The votes were added and read out during voting.

Votes awarded to Germany
Score	Country
2 votes	France
1 votes	Belgium; Italy; Switzerland

Votes awarded by Germany
Score	Country
4 votes	France
3 votes	Belgium
2 votes	Netherlands
1 vote	Switzerland
