= Ferry Graf =

Austrian singer

Ferry Graf (14 December 1931 – 26 July 2017) was an Austrian singer, who later became a Finnish citizen.

== Career ==
Before his musical career, Ferry Graf worked as a locksmith.

In 1959, Graf was selected by the Austrian broadcaster Österreichischer Rundfunk (ORF) to represent the country in the Eurovision Song Contest 1959, with the German language song "Der K und K Kalypso aus Wien" (The K and K Calypso from Vienna). The song ended second to last, in joint ninth place receiving four points. Although the song was released as a single, it was not a commercial success.

In the years following his Eurovision participation, Graf made a few appearances in Austrian and German TV, including, playing at ZDF-Hitparade in 1969, but made no major successes. In the 1970s, he moved to Finland, where he formed his own band, performing Hillbilly music, as well as German cover versions of Elvis Presley's classic song.

Ferry Graf had a Finnish citizenship and lived in Jyväskylä, where he also died in 2017.

== See also ==
- Eurovision Song Contest 1959
- Austria in the Eurovision Song Contest

Preceded by Liane Augustin	Austria in the Eurovision Song Contest; 1959	Succeeded by Harry Winter
