= Corry Brokken =

Dutch singer and judge (1932–2016)

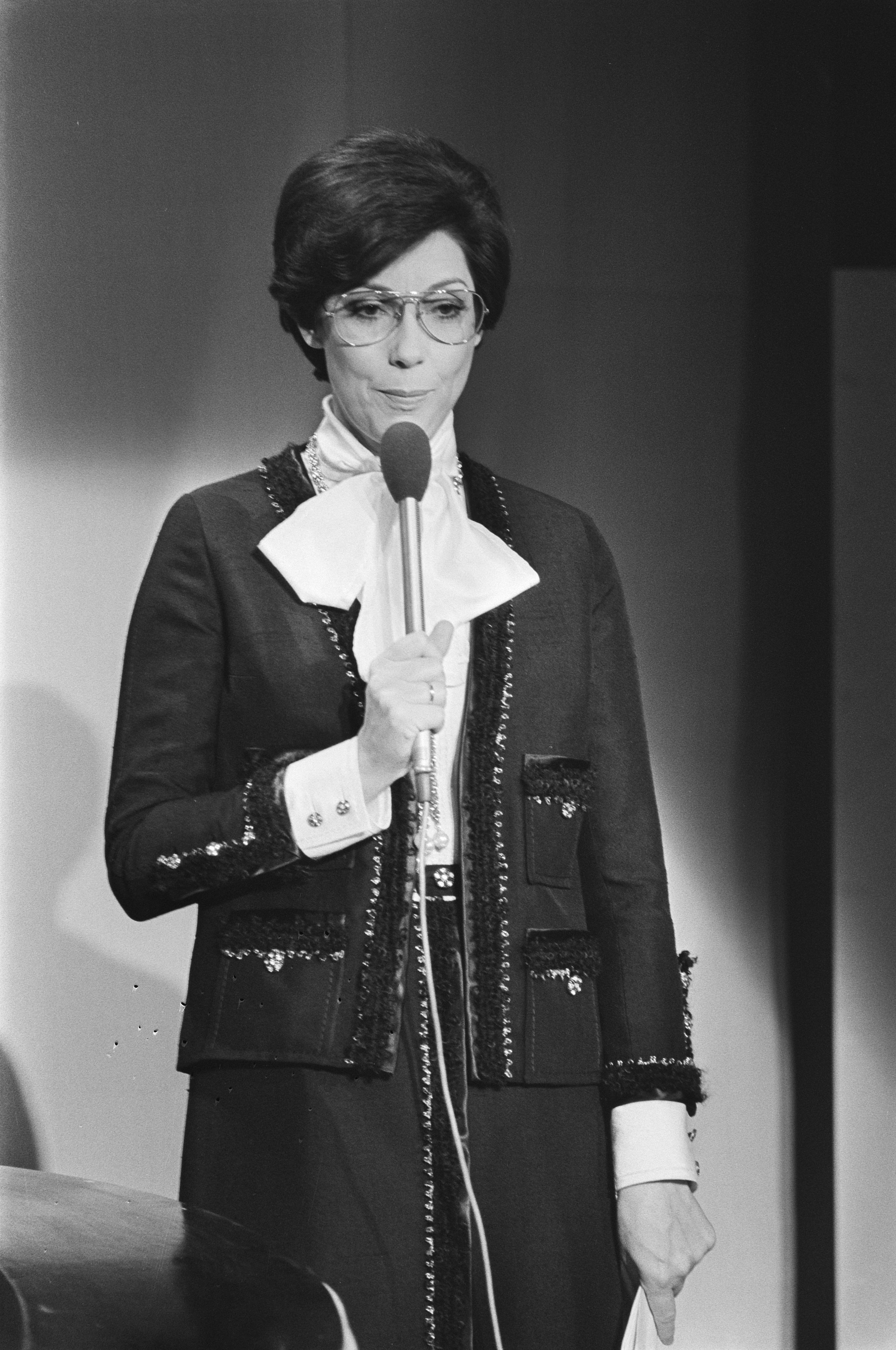
- Brokken hosting the Eurovision Song Contest in 1976

Background information
- Born: Cornelia Maria Brokken; 3 December 1932; Breda, Netherlands
- Died: 31 May 2016 (aged 83) Laren, Netherlands

Cornelia Maria "Corry" Brokken (3 December 1932 – 31 May 2016) was a Dutch singer, television presenter and jurist. In 1957, she won the second edition of the Eurovision Song Contest with the song "Net als toen", representing the Netherlands. Throughout her career, she scored a number of hits, sang in the popular Sleeswijk Revue with Snip en Snap, and had her own television show. She was also the presenter of the Eurovision Song Contest 1976, which was held in The Hague, Netherlands, following the victory of Teach-In the year before. She ended her career as a singer in 1973 to study law, after which she became a lawyer and ultimately a judge.

== Biography ==
=== Eurovision Song Contest ===
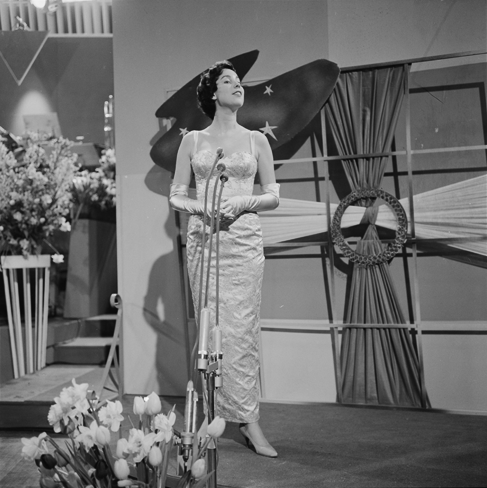
Brokken at the Eurovision Song Contest 1958

In 1956, Brokken won the Nationaal Songfestival 1956 with the song "Voorgoed voorbij", which gave her the right to represent the Netherlands in the first edition of the Eurovision Song Contest alongside runner-up Jetty Paerl. In 1957, she won the Nationaal Songfestival for the second time in a row, and represented the Netherlands again in the Eurovision Song Contest 1957. Her entry "Net als toen", written by Willy van Hemert and composed by Guus Jansen, received most points from the international juries and gave the Netherlands its first win in the competition. In 1958, Brokken won the Nationaal Songfestival once again, this time with the song "Heel de wereld". In the international final, held in Hilversum, Netherlands, her entry finished in last place with only one point. In the book The Eurovision Song Contest – The Official History, John Kennedy O'Connor notes that Corry is the only singer ever to have finished both first and last in the contest.

=== After Eurovision ===
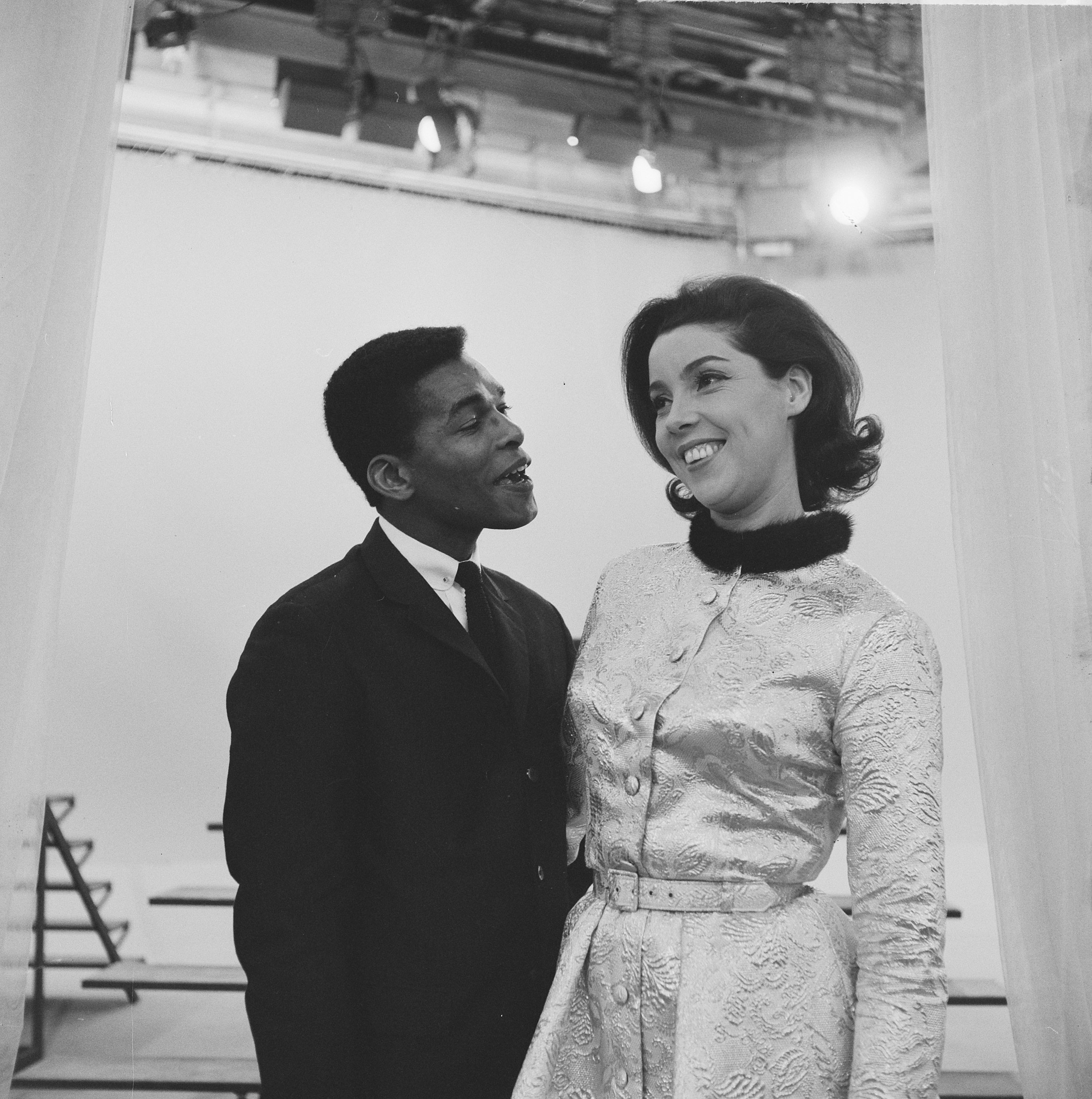
Brokken and Donald Jones during a broadcast of De Corry Brokken Show in 1961

Brokken was one of the most popular female singers in the Netherlands during the 1950s and 1960s, performing in the Sleeswijk Revue alongside Snip en Snap and scoring hits, some of which were translated chansons by Charles Aznavour.

In 1976, Brokken served as the presenter of the Eurovision Song Contest, and in 1997, she announced the results of the Dutch vote for that year's contest. By that time she was no longer active as a singer. She had ended her musical career in 1973 to study law, after which she became a lawyer. She was later installed as a judge in 's-Hertogenbosch. In the 1990s she returned to the entertainment industry, performing on stage and recording a new album. She also wrote a column for the weekly women's magazine Margriet.

Brokken died on 31 May 2016 at the age of 83.

=== Personal ===
Brokken was married three times and had a daughter, Nancy Sleeswijk.

== Discography ==
=== Singles ===
- "Voorgoed voorbij" (1956)
- "Net als toen" (1957)
- "Heel de wereld" (1958)
- "Milord" (1960)

== See also ==
- List of Eurovision Song Contest presenters

Awards and achievements
First	Netherlands in the Eurovision Song Contest; 1956, 1957 and 1958	Succeeded by Teddy Scholten with "Een beetje"
Preceded by (Switzerland) Lys Assia with "Refrain"	Winner of the Eurovision Song Contest; 1957	Succeeded by (France) André Claveau with "Dors, mon amour"
Preceded by (Sweden) Karin Falck	Eurovision Song Contest presenter 1976	Succeeded by (United Kingdom) Angela Rippon
