= Jean Philippe =

French singer (1930–2022)

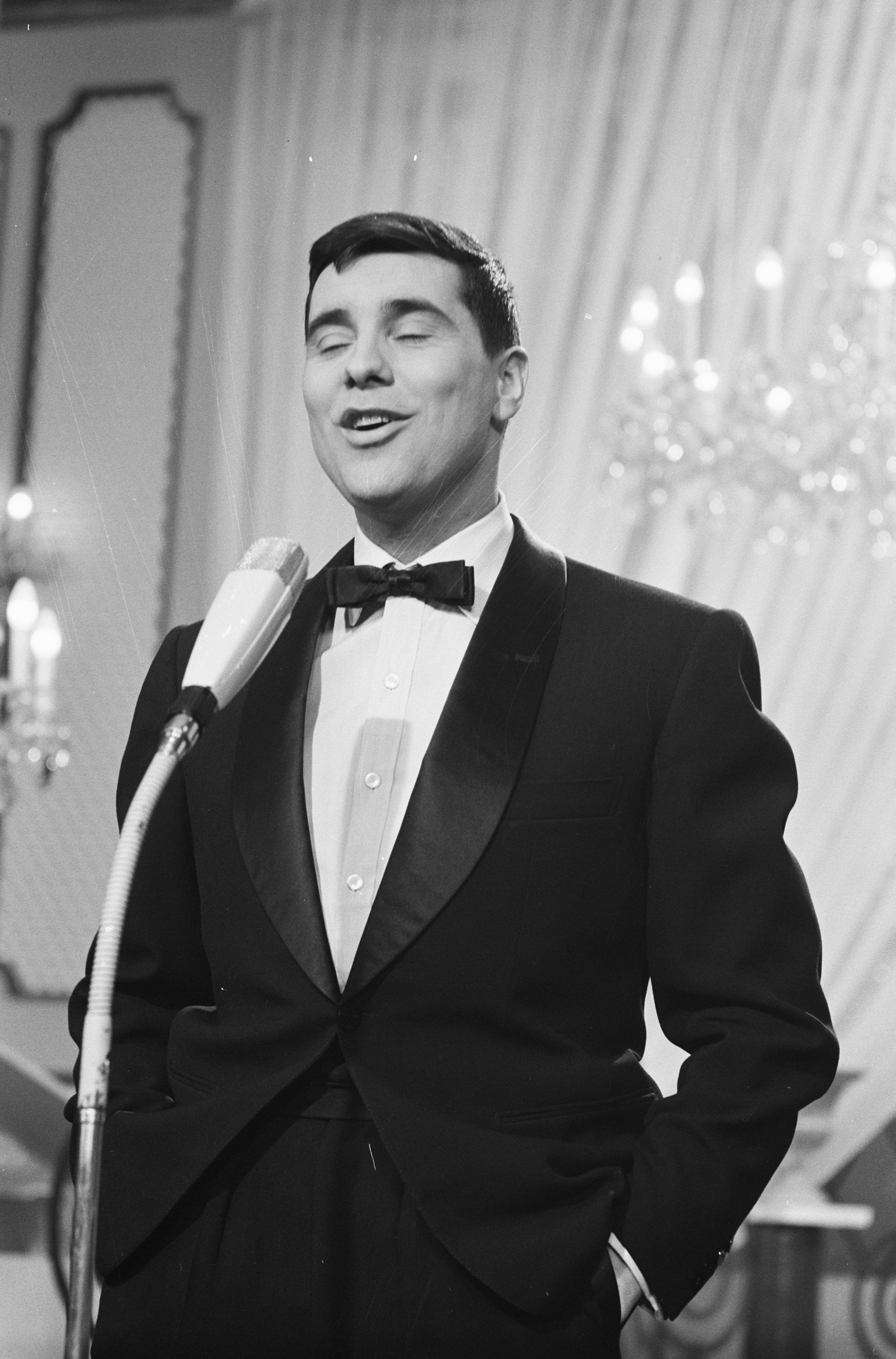
- Jean Philippe at the Eurovision Song Contest 1962
- Born: Jean Philippe Gargantiel; 27 November 1930; France
- Died: 7 January 2022 (aged 91); Quebec, Canada
- Occupation: Singer

Jean Philippe Gargantiel (French pronunciation: [ʒɑ̃ filip], 27 November 1930 – 7 January 2022) was a French singer who represented France at the Eurovision Song Contest 1959. He returned to the contest in 1962 representing Switzerland. He was the first artist to compete for two countries at Eurovision.

== Early life ==
Jean Philippe started his professional life as a receptionist – his father was director at the Grand Hôtel in Paris. He subsequently worked as an accountant as well as a bartender in Cardiff and in the Carlton hotel in Cannes. While working as a vendor in a shirt shop in Paris, his wife registered him in a singing competition organised by a radio station, which he won in January 1957.

== Eurovision Song Contest ==
The Eurovision Song Contest 1959 was held at the Palais des Festivals et des Congrès in Cannes, France, after the victory of André Claveau the previous year, in Hilversum, the Netherlands. Jean Philippe sang "Oui, oui, oui, oui" (Yes, yes, yes, yes) and came third, receiving 15 points.

Philippe returned to the contest in 1962 at the Villa Louvigny in Luxembourg and represented Switzerland with the appropriately titled "Le Retour" (The return). He was less successful second time around, garnering only two points and placing equal tenth.

== Films ==
Jean Philippe appeared in the 1960 film Jazz Boat in which he sang "Oui, oui, oui, oui".

== Personal life and death ==
Philippe was married to Rosanne Jennings. Together they had three children; twins Gilles and Angelique and Natacha. Philippe later lived in Quebec, Canada, where he operated a cafe in Montebello. He died on 7 January 2022, at the age of 91.

Preceded by André Claveau with "Dors, mon amour"	France in the Eurovision Song Contest; 1959	Succeeded by Jacqueline Boyer with "Tom Pillibi"

Preceded by Franca di Rienzo with "Nous aurons demain"	Switzerland in the Eurovision Song Contest; 1962	Succeeded by Esther Ofarim with "T'en va pas"
