= Teddy Scholten =

Dutch singer and television presenter (1926–2010)

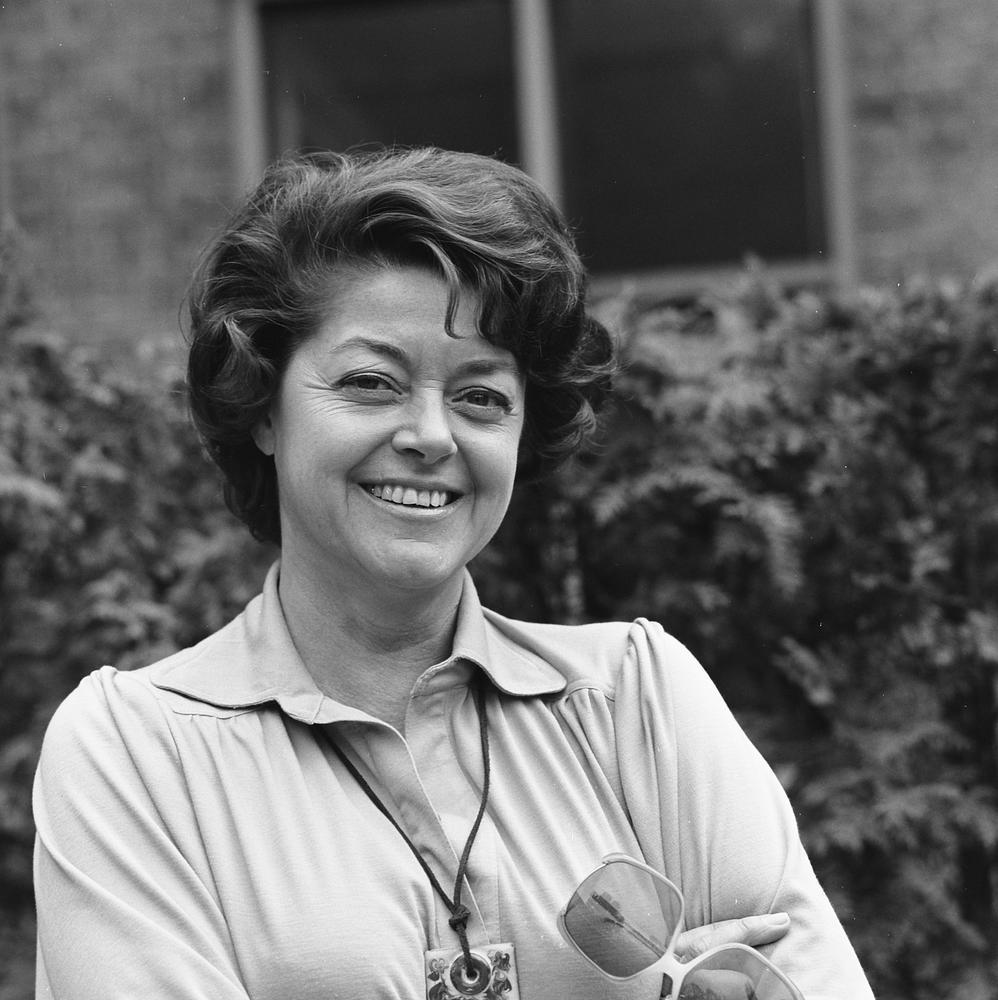
- Scholten in 1978

Background information
- Also known as: Thea van Zwieteren
- Born: Dorothea Margaretha van Zwieteren; 11 May 1926; Rijswijk, Netherlands
- Died: 8 April 2010 (aged 83) The Hague, Netherlands
- Occupations: Singer, presenter
- Years active: 1955–1975

Dorothea Margaretha "Teddy" Scholten (née van Zwieteren; 11 May 1926 – 8 April 2010) was a Dutch singer and television presenter. She is known for winning the Eurovision Song Contest 1959 with the song "Een beetje", representing the Netherlands.

== Career ==
In 1950, Scholten was invited by The Coca-Cola Company to perform at a show in the United States. She was one of the first Dutch popular music artists to perform in the United States.

In 1959, she won the Nationaal Songfestival 1959 with the song "Een beetje", written by Willy van Hemert and Dick Schallies. This gave her the right to represent the Netherlands in the Eurovision Song Contest 1959, held in Cannes, France. She went on to win the competition, receiving a total of 21 points from the international juries. This marked the second win of the Netherlands in the Eurovision Song Contest. "Een beetje" was also recorded in French ("Un p'tit peu"), German ("Sei ehrlich"), Italian ("Un poco") and Swedish ("Om våren").

With her husband, Henk Scholten, she recorded several albums, many of them containing songs for children. Throughout the 1950s and 1960s she appeared in popular television shows in the Netherlands. In 1965 and 1966, she presented the Nationaal Songfestival, the Dutch national final for the Eurovision Song Contest.

Scholten died in The Hague on 8 April 2010, aged 83.

Awards and achievements
Preceded by (France) André Claveau with "Dors, mon amour"	Winner of the Eurovision Song Contest; 1959	Succeeded by (France) Jacqueline Boyer with "Tom Pillibi"
Preceded by Corry Brokken with "Heel de wereld"	Netherlands in the Eurovision Song Contest; 1959	Succeeded by Rudi Carrell with "Wat een geluk"
