= 'n Beetje =

1959 song by Teddy Scholten

Song by Teddy Scholten

from the EP Eurovisie Song Festival
- Language: Dutch
- Released: 1959
- Label: Philips
- Composer: Dick Schallies
- Lyricist: Willy van Hemert

Eurovision Song Contest 1959 entry
- Country: Netherlands
- Artist: Teddy Scholten
- Language: Dutch
- Composer: Dick Schallies
- Lyricist: Willy van Hemert
- Conductor: Dolf van der Linden

Finals performance
- Final result: 1st
- Final points: 21

Entry chronology
- ◄ "Heel de wereld" (1958)
- "Wat een geluk" (1960) ►

Official performance video
- "'n Beetje" on YouTube

"'n Beetje" (Dutch pronunciation: [əm ˈbeːtɕə]; "A little bit"), spelled in full as "Een beetje", is a song recorded by Dutch singer Teddy Scholten with music composed by Dick Schallies and Dutch lyrics written by Willy van Hemert. It represented the Netherlands in the Eurovision Song Contest 1959 held in Cannes, winning the contest. It was the second victory for the country in the first four years of the contest.

== Background ==
=== Conception ===
"'n Beetje" was composed by Dick Schallies and Dutch lyrics by Willy van Hemert. It is more up-tempo than the previous winners had been, as well as being somewhat less serious. It is sung from the perspective of a young woman being asked by her lover if she is "true" and "faithful", to which she answers "A little bit". This unusual admission is then justified by the comment that "everyone is in love at least once", hence nobody can be said to be entirely faithful to anyone. Befitting the lyrics, the music has a lilt to it which had been missing from the previous winners.

=== Eurovision ===
On 17 February 1959, "'n Beetje" performed by both Teddy Scholten –with a full orchestra– and John de Mol –in a more pared-down style– competed in the 4th edition of the Nationaal Songfestival, the national final organized by the Nederlandse Televisie Stichting (NTS) to select its song and performer for the 4th edition of the Eurovision Song Contest. The song won the competition so it became the Dutch entrant for Eurovision. The expert jury chose then Scholten with the full orchestra version of the song.

Scholten recorded it in Dutch, German –as "Sei ehrlich"–, French –"Un p'tit peu"–, Italian –"Un poco"–, and Swedish –"Om våren"–. She sang an English version for the BBC as "The Moment".

On 11 March 1959, the Eurovision Song Contest was held at the Palais des Festivals et des Congrès in Cannes hosted by Radiodiffusion-Télévision Française (RTF) and broadcast live throughout the continent. Scholten performed the song fifth in a field of eleven entrants, following Monaco's "Mon ami Pierrot" by Jacques Pills and preceding Germany's "Heute Abend wollen wir tanzen geh'n" by Alice and Ellen Kessler. Dolf van der Linden conducted the event's live orchestra in the performance of the Dutch entry.

By the close of voting, it had received 21 points, placing it first in a field of eleven, winning the contest. The song was succeeded as Dutch representative in 1960 by "Wat een geluk" by Rudi Carrell, and as Contest winner by "Tom Pillibi" by Jacqueline Boyer for France.

== Reception ==
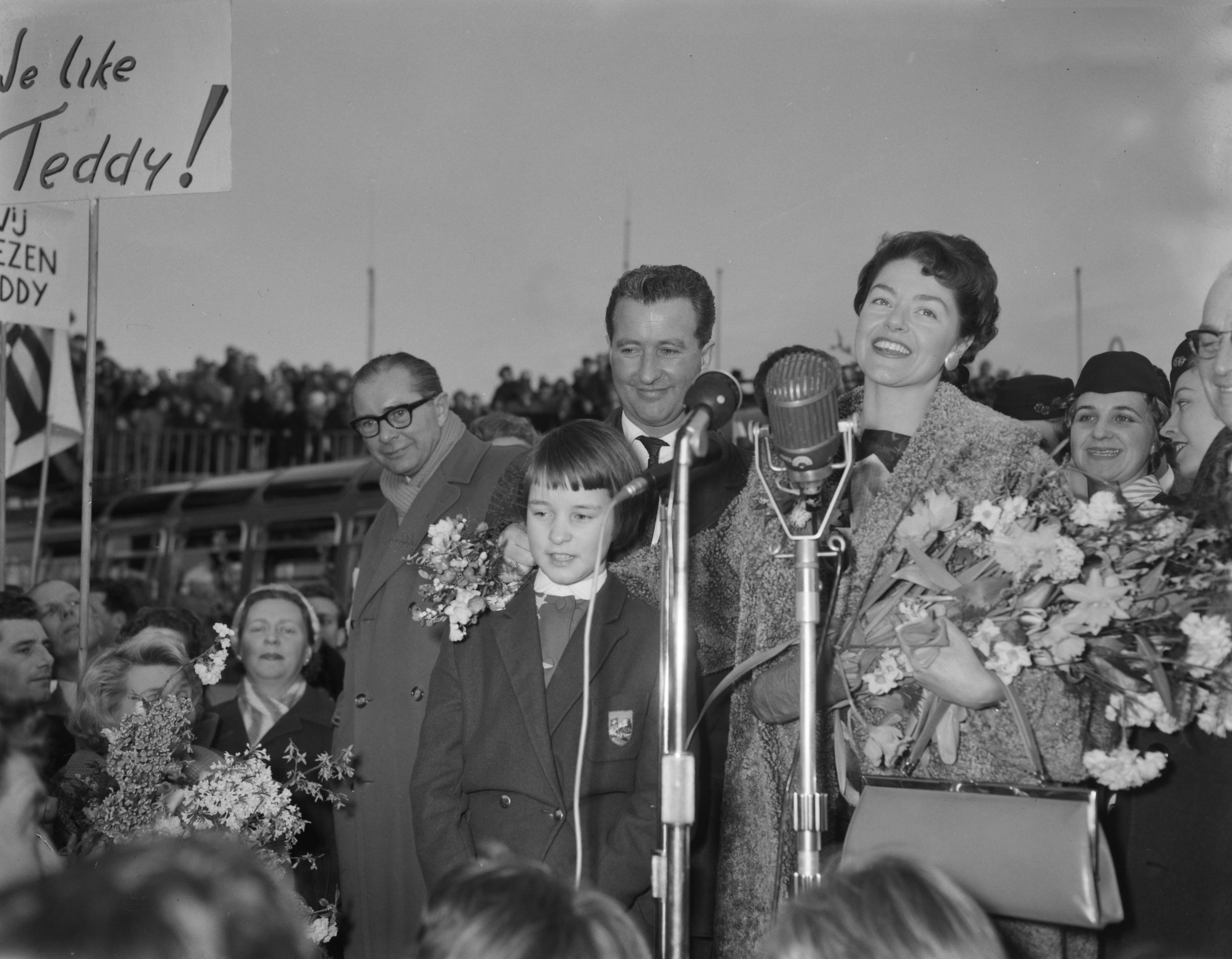
Teddy Scholten arriving at Schipol Airport just after winning Eurovision.

"Een beetje"'s Eurovision performance was called "excellent" and "surprisingly fresh" in an article published a few days after the contest by Dutch newspaper Eindhovens Dagblad, which added that its mid-show timing, after four entries with six more to go, already showcased it as standing out in the field and predicted to get a decent score. With that, it viewed that for some time it looked as though Switzerland and then the United Kingdom will swoop the win, while pointing that Italy was given the best chance to win prior to the evening; and as part of the article's big-lettered title, reviewed that the United Kingdom was a "tough competitor". In addition it opined that the entry's musical director, Dutch conductor Dolf van der Linden, didn't seem very enthusiastic with the melodic execution, by France's RTF orchestra.

DutchNews.nl described the song as having a "charming performance" by Scholten, a lively rhythm and lyrics peppered with wordplay which "added to the song's musicality – even for those who did not speak Dutch", and altogether as the reasons the entry "won over everybody". However, it adds that Scholten was a "surprising winner" since the "growing army of Eurovision pundits put their bets on the UK entry" performed by Pearl Carr and Teddy Johnson, whom it viewed as a potential "English equivalent" of Scholten and her fellow artist husband Henk.

Comparing the song to the previous 1956–1958 contests winners, entertainment website Screen Rant reviewed it in 2021 as having "a bit more innocuous" lyrics, reflecting the writers' "inherently self-effacing nature", a "faster pace" music and noting "energy" in Scholten's performance. It concludes those to "prove" the entry as "among the most influential Eurovision songs to date" as well as the first Eurovision entry to "hint at what the identity of the contest would come to be"; bearing ingredients of the contest's styles and popularity celebrated nowadays.

Preceded by "Dors, mon amour" by André Claveau	Eurovision Song Contest winners 1959	Succeeded by "Tom Pillibi" by Jacqueline Boyer
