= Ronnex Records =

- Founded: 1951; 73 years ago
- Founder: Albert Van Hoogten
- Genre: Rock and roll, pop
- Country of origin: Belgium

Ronnex Records is a former Belgian record label, founded by Albert Van Hoogten in 1951.

Other well-known artists on Ronnex were Jack Hammer (an American singer from New Orleans who had settled in Belgium and was known as "The Twistin' King"), Freddy Sunder, The Shake Spears, Burt Blanca, John Woolley and Just Born, Davy Jr. & Guess Who?, Erik Marijsse

Ronnex Records released rock and roll and pop music, as well as recordings of Flemish and Walloon artists. Albert Van Hoogten's brother René (Ray) ran his own record label, Moonglow Records. Ronnex distributed US artists like Bill Haley, Little Richard and The Righteous Brothers.

Ronnex Records was acquired by BMG Music, but was sold to Pop Eye Records (Belgium).
