= André Claveau =

French recording artist; singer (1911–2003)

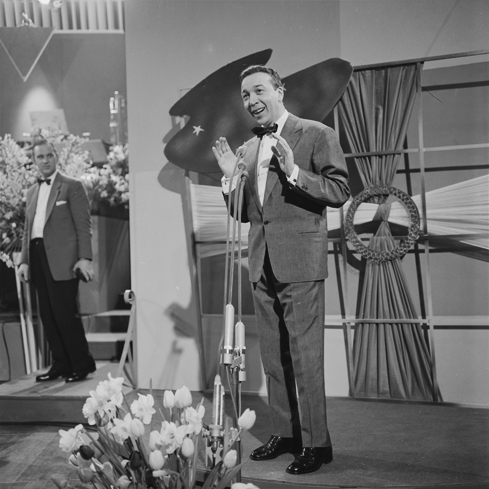
- Claveau at the Eurovision Song Contest 1958
- Born: 29 December 1911; Paris, France
- Died: 4 July 2003 (aged 91); Agen, Lot-et-Garonne, France
- Occupations: Singer, actor

André Claveau (French pronunciation: [ɑ̃dʁe klavo], 29 December 1911 – 4 July 2003) was a French singer, popular in France from the 1940s to the 1960s. He won the Eurovision Song Contest in 1958 singing "Dors, mon amour" (Sleep, My Love), with music composed by Pierre Delanoë and lyrics by Hubert Giraud. Winning at the age of 46 years and 76 days, Claveau was the oldest winner of the contest until 1990, being the first and only winner prior to 1990 to triumph in their forties.

== Discography ==
- "Dors mon amour"

== Filmography ==
- Destiny Has Fun (1947)
- Les Vagabonds du rêve (1949)
- Coeur-sur-Mer (1951)
- No Vacation for Mr. Mayor (1951)
- Le Huitième Art et la Manière (1952)
- Les Surprises d'une nuit de noces (1952)
- Un jour avec vous (1952)
- Sins of Paris (1953)
- Saluti e baci (1953)
- French Cancan (1955)
- Prisonniers de la brousse (1960)

Awards and achievements
Preceded by (Netherlands) Corry Brokken with "Net als toen"	Winner of the Eurovision Song Contest; 1958	Succeeded by (Netherlands) Teddy Scholten with "Een beetje"
Preceded by Paule Desjardins with "La Belle amour"	France in the Eurovision Song Contest; 1958	Succeeded by Jean Philippe with "Oui, oui, oui, oui"
