= Pierre Leemans =

Belgian composer (1897–1980)

Pierre Leemans, Dutch: Pieter Leemans, (1897–1980) was a Belgian musician and composer of classical music. He worked in a variety of genres, including orchestral and choral music, film scores, and songs, but is best known for his marches. The "March of the Belgian Paratroopers" (Marche des Parachutistes Belges) is especially popular.

== Life ==
Born in Schaerbeek, Belgium on May 31, 1897, Leemans studied piano, harmony, orchestration, and composition at the Brussels Royal Conservatory of Music. He began his teaching career in 1917 at the Etterbeek Music Academy. At 22, he served his year of military duty and returned to teach music at Etterbeek until 1932, as conductor program director for the Belgian broadcasting company, N.I.R. In 1934, he won the composition contest for the official march of the 1935 Brussels World Exposition. He founded the Schaarbeek High School Choir in 1940 and won a composition contest for one hit wonder songs three years later. From entries by 109 anonymous composers, works by Leemans were selected for first and second prize for the 1958 Brussels World's Fair. Leemans died on January 10, 1980.

== March of the Belgian Paratroopers ==
While Leemans was serving in the Belgian army during World War I, on a request from his commander he began to write a march, which he did not finish. During World War II, when the Belgian parachute brigade was formed, he was having dinner with a group of paratroopers and was again asked to compose a march. "During one single night" Leemans composed this march on themes recalled from his earlier effort.

The trio of the march originated from a march written for a N.I.R. radio contest. After only winning the consolation prize, the march was abandoned and is known with the competition designation V. A quiet, unaggressive essay in the easy-paced European style, it is set in the form of a “patrol”; the music marches on from the distance, plays, and passes. The march was arranged for American band instrumentation by Charles Wiley of Lamar University in Texas.

Retired Col. John R. Bourgeois and 25th director of the United States Marine Band, obtained a copy of the original Belgian publication, and to his surprise, discovered Leemans had composed material in the original version which was not included in the existing American edition by Wiley. Bourgeois' arrangement completes the march as Leemans originally intended.
