= Willy van Hemert =

Dutch actor, director, & songwriter (1912–1993)

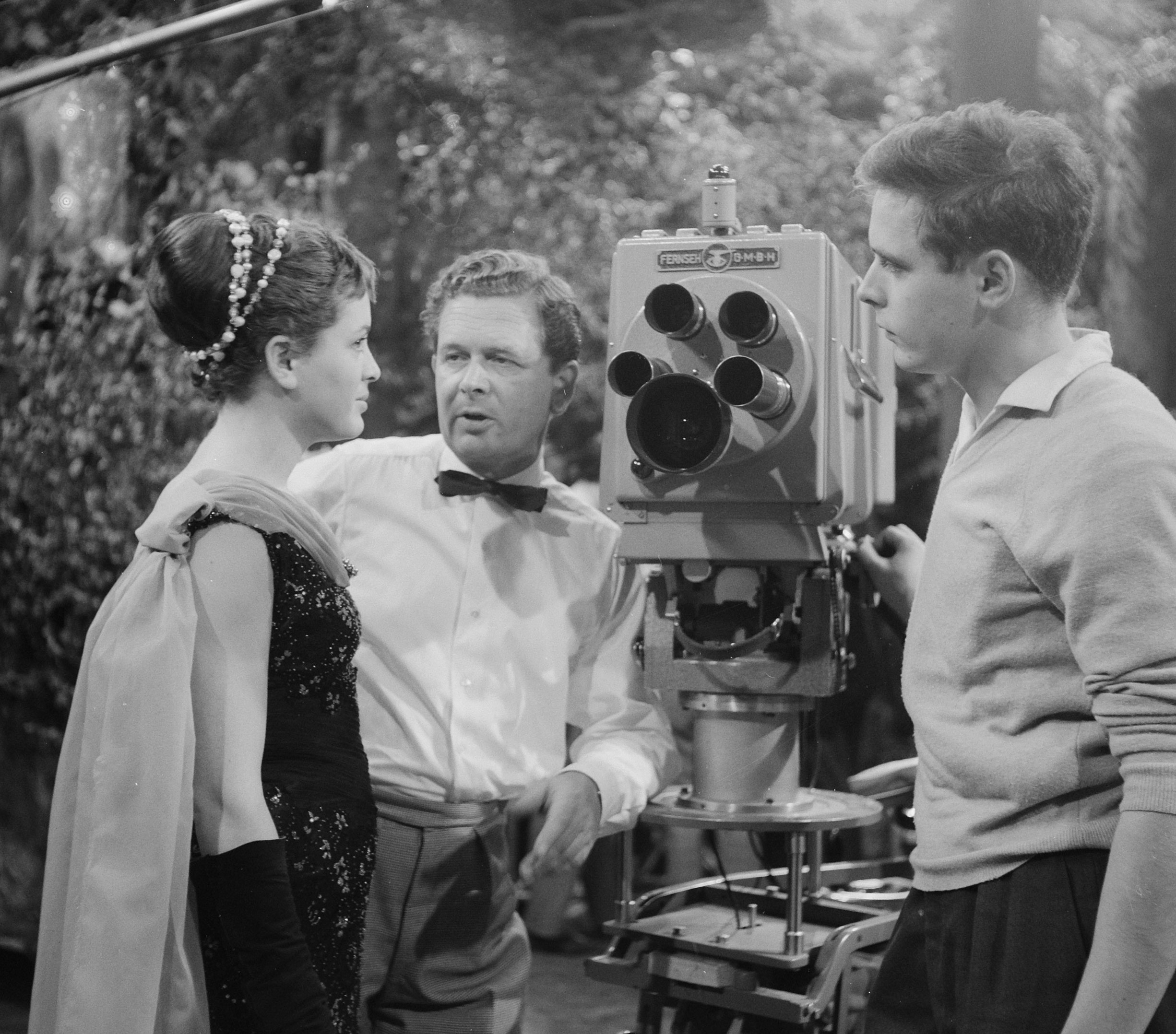
Willy van Hemert with daughter Ellen and son Ruud in 1960

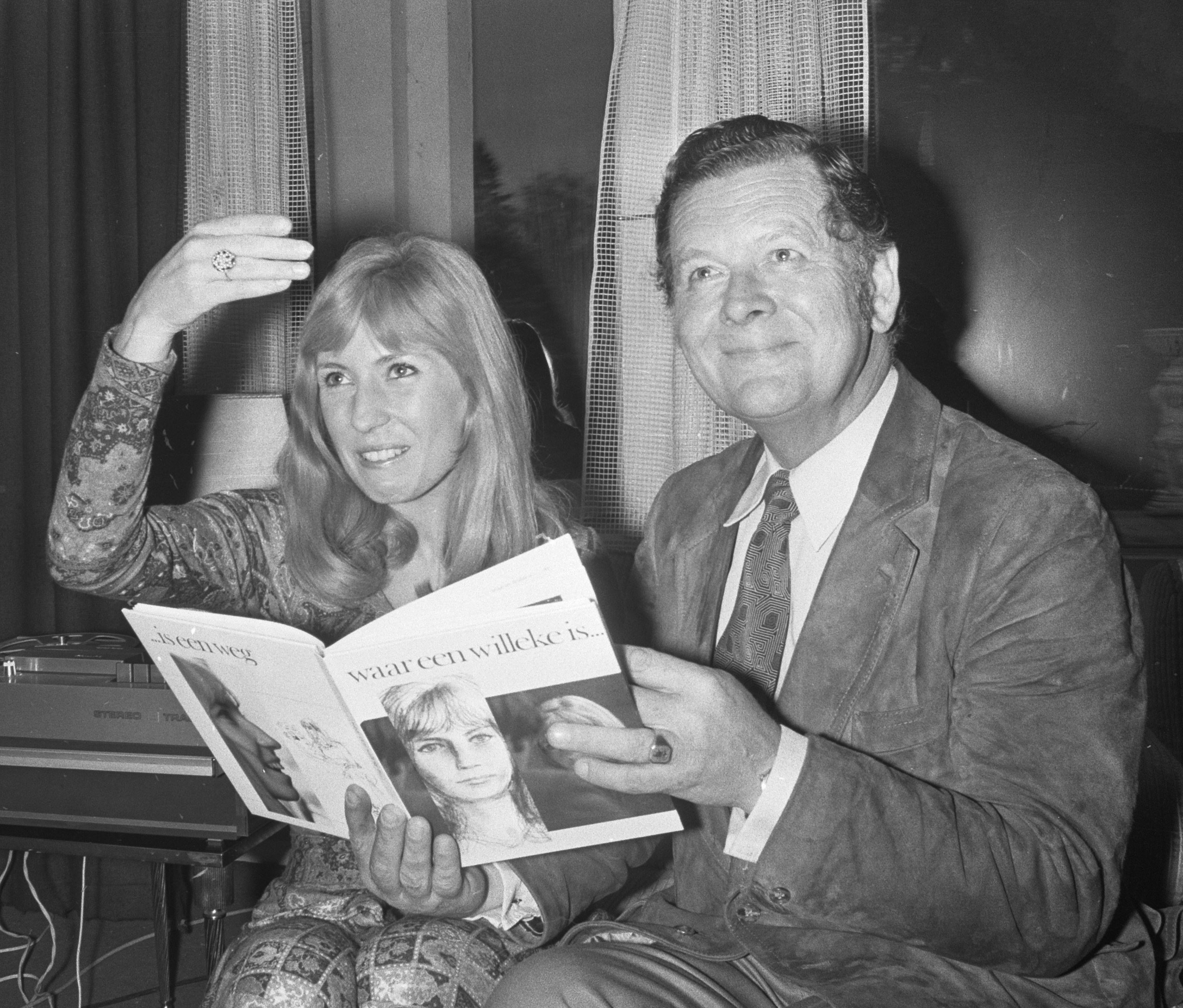
Willeke Alberti and Willy van Hemert (right) in 1971

Willem Catharinus (Willy) van Hemert (29 March 1912 – 26 June 1993) was a Dutch actor and theatre and television director, but is best known as a songwriter who penned two winning Dutch songs for the Eurovision Song Contest.

== Biography ==
Van Hemert was born in Utrecht in 1912 as Willem Catharinus van Hemert. He attended the Bonifacius School in Utrecht. He studied drama and (briefly) law.

In 1955 Van Hemert adapted William Inge's Come Back, Little Sheba for Dutch television. Two years later, in 1957, he wrote the lyrics for the winning song at the Eurovision Song Contest 1957, "Net als toen", performed by Corry Brokken. Two years later van Hemert won the Eurovision Song Contest 1959, with the song "Een beetje", performed by Teddy Scholten. Van Hemert also wrote the lyrics for the Dutch entry in the Eurovision Song Contest 1960 when the contest was staged in London (as the Netherlands had hosted the Eurovision Song Contest 1958). The song was called "Wat een geluk" and was performed by Rudi Carrell.

His most famous song may be "Zuiderzeeballade", or "Ballad of the Zuiderzee", a song from 1962 that ranked ninth in the top 100 of most popular Dutch songs from the twentieth century.

Van Hemert was the father of four children by his first wife Miep Kronenburg: Hans van Hemert (who would later write various Dutch entries for the song contest), Ruud, Ellen and Eric van Hemert. Actor Coen Flink is his son-in-law.

Willy van Hemert died, aged 81, in Hechtel.
