= Pearl Carr and Teddy Johnson =

English husband-and-wife team of entertainers

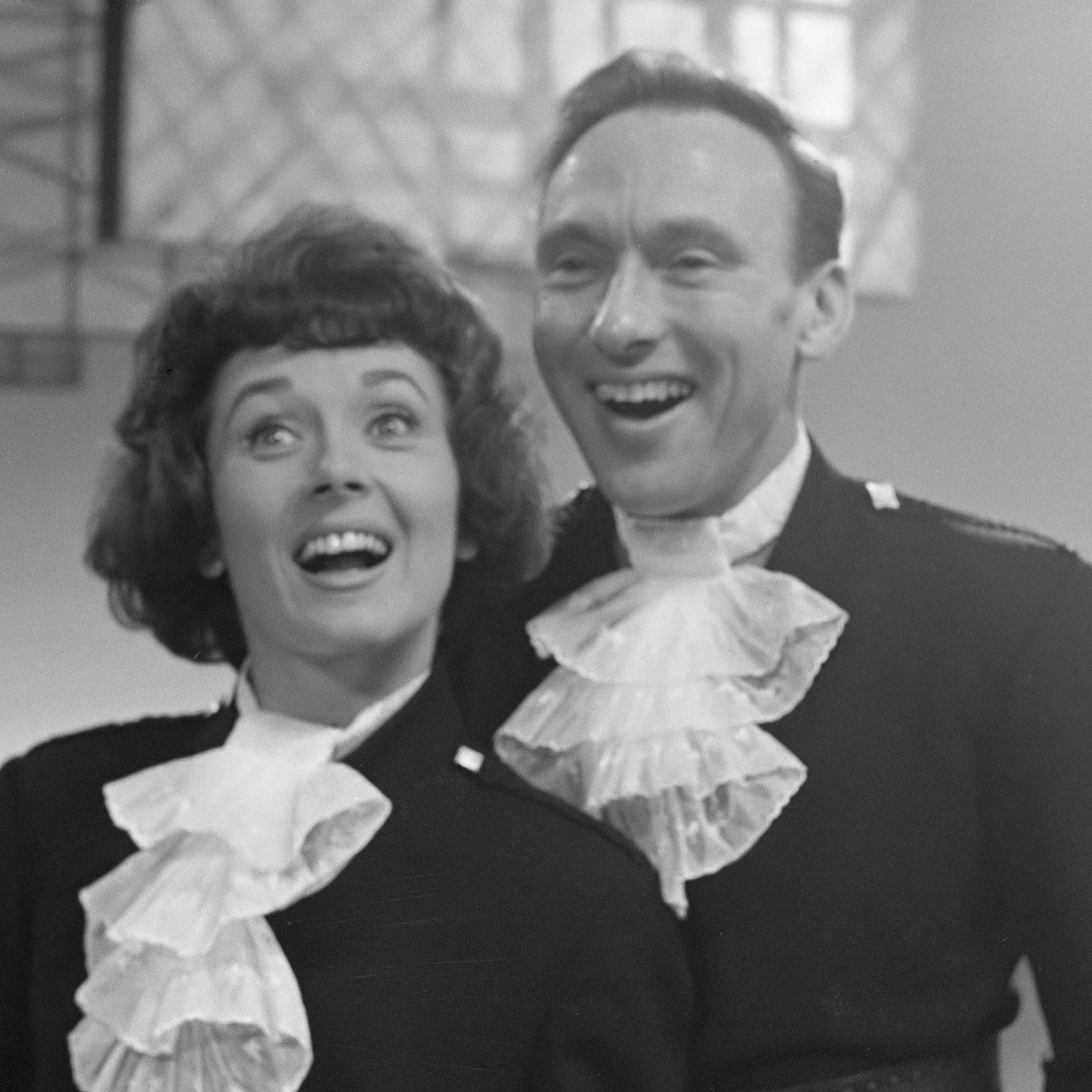
Pearl Carr and Teddy Johnson (1962)

Pearl Lavinia Carr (2 November 1921 – 16 February 2020) and Edward Victor "Teddy" Johnson (4 September 1919 – 6 June 2018) were English husband-and-wife entertainers who were best-known during the 1950s and early 1960s. They were the UK's Eurovision entrants at the 1959 contest with "Sing, Little Birdie", which came second.

== Early life ==
Carr was born in Exmouth, Devon, and Johnson was born in Surbiton, Surrey. They were both successful solo singers before their marriage in 1955. Carr's mother, who had worked on the variety stage, taught her to sing and dance. She worked in a C.B. Cochran show, and later joined the Three in Harmony singing group, which appeared in the revue Best Bib And Tucker starring Tommy Trinder at the London Palladium in November, 1942. During 1944, she toured with Phil Green and his Basin Street Orchestra, and then she became a singer with various RAF Bands led by Leslie Douglas in 1945. By the late 1940s, she was singing with Cyril Stapleton and his Orchestra as they toured the UK's dance halls. Carr became the lead singer of a vocal quartet, The Keynotes, who recorded popular songs such as 1951's "There's a Harvest Moon Tonight". The Keynotes were regulars on the BBC radio show Take It from Here in 1949, whilst in 1950, Carr was a fixture on Breakfast with (Bernard) Braden, broadcast at 8:15 a.m. on the BBC Home Service. She moved with Bernard Braden to his programme Bedtime with Braden (9:30 p.m.) in September 1950. She was given her own BBC radio series, In the Blue of the Evening, commencing on 22 March 1951.

Johnson left school at 14 and initially worked in an office. Four years later, he obtained a first professional booking, as a drummer and assistant steward on the P&O liner SS Corfu. He made his first broadcast in 1939 for Radio Ceylon, which provoked a fellow musician to tell him: "You are a very good singer but a bloody awful drummer". During World War II, Johnson served in the merchant navy, working on the Queen Mary ship as a butcher on the transatlantic run. After the war, he was part of the resident band at the Locarno dance hall in Streatham, south London, and he also broadcast as a singer with the bandleader Jack Payne. In 1948, he was taken on as chief announcer for Radio Luxembourg and spent two years with them, presenting and compiling a range of shows, from request programmes to the first radio hit parade, compiled from British sales of sheet music. He was offered a recording contract by Columbia Records, and returned to London to begin a successful recording career. Johnson's first record was "Beloved, Be Faithful", a sheet music chart no. 1 hit. In total, he cut 60 sides for the Columbia label as a solo artist, including covers of hits including "Tennessee Waltz" and "I'll Always Love You". He was also a DJ on BBC Radio 2 as the first presenter of the popular programme All Time Greats.

== Joint success ==
Carr and Johnson were married in 1955 and remained so for 63 years, until their deaths. They became known professionally as "Mr. and Mrs. Music", and were frequently on British television light entertainment programmes. These included The Winifred Atwell Show, Big Night Out, Two of a Kind (with Morecambe and Wise), Sunday Night at the London Palladium, The Arthur Haynes Show, Thank Your Lucky Stars and Blackpool Night Out. They were also regulars on the children's TV show Crackerjack! with Eamonn Andrews and Ronnie Corbett. The duo were part of a record-breaking season at the London Palladium with Bruce Forsyth, and were chosen to appear in the 1960 Royal Variety Performance.

Carr and Johnson represented the United Kingdom in the Eurovision Song Contest 1959, Johnson being the first male Briton to take part, and they finished second with the song "Sing, Little Birdie". The record peaked at No. 12 on the UK Singles Chart.

In 2011, Johnson revealed that they initially thought the contest to become the British entry was the extent of their booking. "We had never heard of the Eurovision Song Contest before and were going to be booked as solo singers, but that consummated Pearl and Teddy as a double act. As far as we were concerned it was just another gig, but it was the easiest money we had ever had. There were two heats – one on the Monday and another on the Wednesday, with the final on Saturday night. When we won, the BBC Head of Television Light Entertainment Eric Maschwitz said he was thrilled that Pearl and I would now represent our country in the Eurovision Song Contest in Cannes. I said: 'What? What do you mean?' I didn't know we had to represent the country. We had no idea whatsoever. He gave me the dates for Cannes and I just hoped we had them available. As it happened, we did. Pearl flew out with three guys from the BBC but I was doing a small show for ATV and got a later flight."

They also tried to represent the United Kingdom again in 1960, entering two songs into the pre-selection, "Pickin' Petals" and "When The Tide Turns"; the latter made the final. It was up against Johnson's own brother, Bryan. In the end, Bryan won and went on to represent the United Kingdom in the Eurovision Song Contest 1960. He came second, with "Looking High, High, High". Carr and Johnson had another hit single the following year, "How Wonderful to Know", which charted at No. 23 in the UK, which was frequently played on the BBC's Family Favourites programme.

Carr and Johnson continued to appear in summer seasons around the UK and on cruise ships for the Royal Viking Line. In 1986, they were the subject of an edition of This Is Your Life. After this, they appeared in the West End revival of the Stephen Sondheim musical Follies, playing vaudeville couple Wally and Emily Whitman, singing "Rain on the Roof". It was at the conclusion of its 18-month run in 1990 that they decided to retire. Shortly afterwards, EMI issued a CD of their joint recordings, The Magic of Pearl Carr and Teddy Johnson. That year, they received the Lifetime Achievement Award from the British Music Hall Society.

== Later life ==
Following their retirement, Carr and Johnson moved into Brinsworth House, a home for retired entertainers in south west London.

Johnson appeared in a short piece to camera for a Morecambe and Wise tribute in 2018. He died on 6 June 2018, aged 98. Carr died on 16 February 2020, also aged 98.

== See also ==
- United Kingdom in the Eurovision Song Contest

Awards and achievements
Preceded by Patricia Bredin with "All"	United Kingdom in the Eurovision Song Contest; 1959	Succeeded by Bryan Johnson with "Looking High, High, High"
