= Otto Lington =

Danish musician

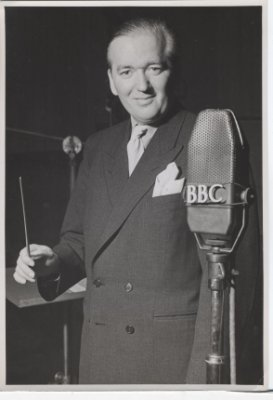
- Jazz pioneer Otto Lington.

Background information
- Born: Otto Carl Johan Lington; 5 August 1903; Copenhagen, Denmark
- Died: 15 December 1992 (aged 89)
- Occupations: Bandleader, Composer
- Instrument: Violin
- Formerly of: The Lingtonians

Otto Lington (5 August 1903 – 15 December 1992) was a Danish composer, bandleader and violinist. Lington was a pioneer of jazz and bandleader for Shirley Bassey, Josephine Baker, and Fats Waller among many others. Lington is the grandfather of saxophonist Michael Lington.
