= Franck Pourcel =

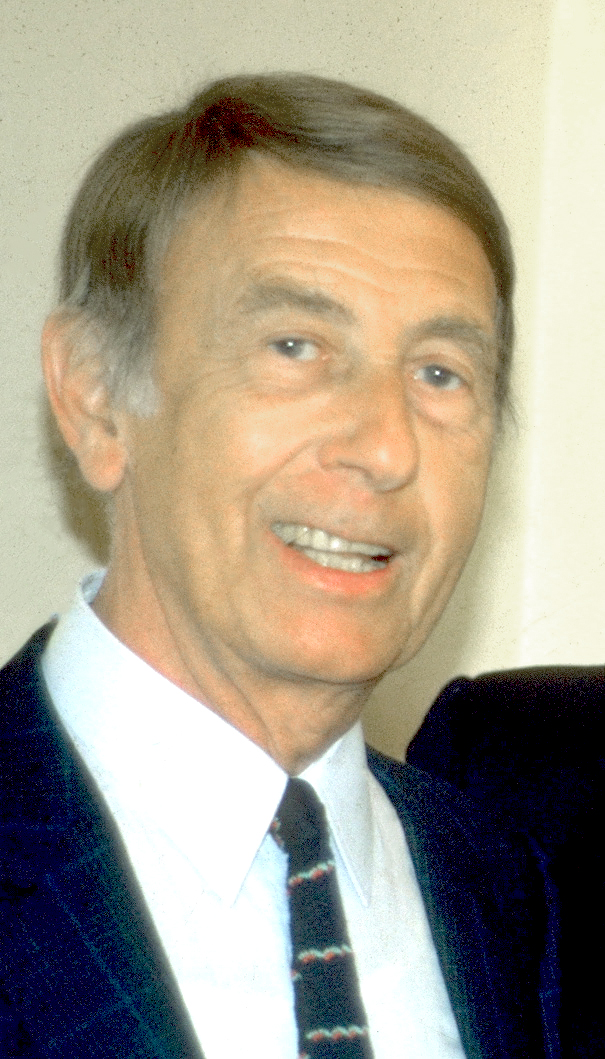
- Born: 14 August 1913; Marseille, France
- Died: 12 November 2000 (aged 87); Neuilly-Sur-Seine, France
- Education: Conservatoire de Paris
- Occupations: Composer; arranger; conductor
- Years active: 1952–1995
- Notable work: 1956 until 1972 French Conductor for Eurovision Song Contest; Conductor of London Symphonic Orchestra; BBC Orchestra
- Musical career
- Genres: Classical music, popular music, easy listening
- Instrument: Conductor
- Labels: Pathe-Marconi, EMI

Franck Pourcel (14 August 1913 – 12 November 2000) was a French composer, arranger, and conductor of popular and classical music.

== Biography ==
=== Early life ===
Born in Marseille, France, Pourcel started learning the violin at the age of six. Later, Pourcel studied violin at the Conservatoire in Marseille, and also drums because he loved jazz, and he spent a year in Paris at the Conservatoire.

By 1931, he was working as a violinist in several theaters in Marseille, marrying Odette eight years later. He then became the musical director for Lucienne Boyer, with whom he went on a world tour.

=== Career: recording ===
He immigrated to the United States in 1952 but returned to France the following year to record "Blue Tango" and the follow-up "Limelight". In 1954, Pourcel recorded his first album on the Pathé-Marconi record label, with whom he would record a total of nine albums in a three-year period. In 1956, he recorded his version of The Platters hit "Only You", which sold over three million copies by 1959, and was awarded a gold disc. It peaked at number 9 on the United States Billboard pop chart during a 16 weeks chart run.

- Succès de Films, orchestra instrumental album

=== Conducting ===
Between 1956 and 1972, he was the conductor for France at the Eurovision Song Contest, with the exceptions of 1957 and 1968. Four of the songs that he conducted won first place for France. As a result, France became the most successful country in the contest's early years, until Luxembourg matched its four wins in 1973.

By 1958, Pourcel started recording classical music. His series of Pages Célèbres led him to conduct the London Symphony Orchestra, The Society of Concerts for the Conservatoire, The BBC Orchestra at the Royal Festival Hall, and the Lamoureux Orchestra at the Salle Pleyel in Paris. In 1961, he co-composed with Paul Mauriat the hit "Chariot", which was recorded by Petula Clark and followed up by Peggy March as "I Will Follow Him". The song became the main theme for the film, Sister Act.

In 1975, at the request of Air France, Pourcel composed an anthem for their new supersonic plane, Concorde.

Pourcel recorded 250 albums, and over 3000 songs, and he conducted famous orchestras such as the London Symphonic Orchestra, BBC Orchestra and Orchestre des concerts Lamoureux. He created the series Amour Danse et violons (54 albums) and the classical series Pages Célébres. His first recordings from 1956 to 1962 were released under the series Originals.

Pourcel recorded until 1995 with EMI.

He died on 12 November 2000 in Neuilly-sur-Seine, at the age of 87, from Parkinson's disease. His daughter Françoise Pourcel, is taking care of his musical legacy.

== Awards ==
He was rewarded with the following distinctions:

- 1956: The Grand prix du disque Français
- 1957: The Grand prix du disque in Brazil
- 1963: The Golden disc in Venezuela Discomoda
- 1965: Amsterdam: The Edison Prize for his orchestrations of pop music
- 1966: Gold record for his sales in France
- 1968: Golden disc in Colombia for Disco Mundo
- 1969: Grand Prix du disque of the Charles Cros Academy in Paris
- 1969: Gold record in Japan for the album Continental Tango
- 1970: Gold record in Japan for album Adoro, featuring "Adoro"
- 1972: Tokyo Music Festival; Arranger award
- 1973: Guacaipuro de Oro in Venezuela
- 1973: Gold record in Japan for the album For Your Lovely Baby

== Albums ==
- Pourcel in Paris (1959) Capitol
- Pourcel Pastels (1961)
- Mosaïque Orientale (1963)
- Our Man in Paris (1966) Imperial
- Beautiful Obsession (1967)
- Somewhere My Love (1967)
- A Man & a Woman (1967)
- New Sounds Tangos (1968)
- Love is Blue (1968)
- Aquarius (1969) Atco
- Midnight Cowboy (1969) Paramount
- Adoro (1969) Odeon
- I'll Never Fall in Love Again (1969)
- Meets the Beatles (1970)
- All About Franck Pourcel (1970) 2 LP set
- Love Story (1971) Odeon
- Hits by a Grand Orchestra EMI
- Western (1972) Odeon
- For All We Know (1972)
- Day by Day (1972)
- Femmes (1972)
- Mammy Blue (1972)
- Hymne a L'amour (1972)
- The Godfather (1972)
- Live & Let Die (1973)
- Papillon (1973)
- Meets the Beatles, 2 (1973)
- World is a Circle (1973)
- Cole Porter Story (1974) EMI
- Yesterday Once More (1974)
- Singing in the Rain (1975)
- History D'O (1976) Odeon
- Hi-Fi 77 (1977)
- Latino Americano 78 (1978)
- Franck Pourcel conducts A Digital Concert (1979)
- Turbo Rapsody (1981)
- In a Nostalgia mood (1984)
- For Your Lovely Baby (1986)
- Dancing in the Sun/And Now ... (1997)
- Les Meilleurs (1998)
- This is Pourcel/Plays the Cole Porter Story (1999) 2 CD set
- Importance of Your Love/Thinking of You (2006) Vocalion
- Originals (2008) EPM 3 CD set
- Girls/Magnifique (2011) Vocalion

=== Singles ===
- Only You (US #9, 1959)
- Tango Militaire (1959)
- Milord (US #112, 1961)
- Twistin' the Twist (1962)
- I Will Follow You (1963)
- The Umbrellas of Cherbourg (1964)
- Those Were the Days (1968)
- The Lonely Season (AC #38, 1969)
- Aquarius (1969)
- Mister Lonely (1970) Odeon, Japan
- If You Could Read My Mind (1971)
- Day by Day (1972)
- The World Is a Circle (1973)
- I Only Want to Say (AC #22, 1981)

Media offices
Preceded by (Netherlands) Dolf van der Linden	Eurovision Song Contest conductor 1959	Succeeded by (United Kingdom) Eric Robinson
Preceded by (United Kingdom) Eric Robinson	Eurovision Song Contest conductor 1961	Succeeded by (Luxembourg) Jean Roderès
