= Sanremo Music Festival 1959 =

Italian song contest (9th edition)

Dates and venue
- Semi-final 1: 29 January 1959
- Semi-final 2: 30 January 1959
- Final: 31 January 1959
- Venue: Sanremo Casino; Sanremo, Italy

Organisation
- Broadcaster: Radiotelevisione italiana (RAI)
- Presenters: Enzo Tortora and Adriana Serra

Vote
- Number of entries: 20
- Winner: "Piove (Ciao, ciao bambina)" Domenico Modugno and Johnny Dorelli

The Sanremo Music Festival 1959 (Italian: Festival di Sanremo 1959), officially the 9th Italian Song Festival (9º Festival della canzone italiana), was the ninth annual Sanremo Music Festival, held at the Sanremo Casino in Sanremo between 30 January and 1 February 1959, and broadcast by Radiotelevisione italiana (RAI). The show was presented by Enzo Tortora and Adriana Serra.

According to the rules of this edition every song was performed in a double performance by a couple of singers or groups, with some artists performing multiple songs. The winner of the festival was "Piove (Ciao, ciao bambina)", performed by Domenico Modugno (who was also the composer of the song) and Johnny Dorelli. The couple had already won the previous edition of the festival with "Nel blu, dipinto di blu". Modugno went on to perform the song for Italy at the Eurovision Song Contest 1959.

== Participants and results ==
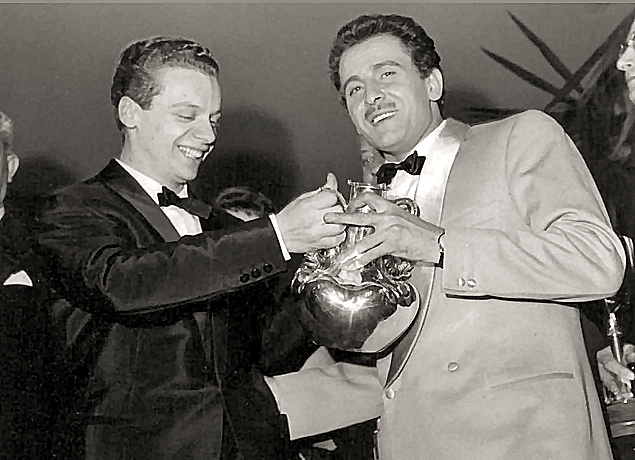
Johnny Dorelli (left) and Domenico Modugno with the first prize

Participants and results
Song	Artist(s)		Songwriter(s)	Rank
"Piove (Ciao, ciao bambina)"	Domenico Modugno	Johnny Dorelli	Domenico Modugno; Dino Verde	1
"Io sono il vento"	Arturo Testa	Gino Latilla	Gian Carlo Testoni; Giuseppe Fanciulli	2
"Conoscerti"	Achille Togliani	Teddy Reno	Giovanni D'Anzi	3
"Tua"	Jula de Palma	Tonina Torrielli	Bruno Pallesi; Walter Malgoni	4
"Lì per lì"	Aurelio Fierro	Teddy Reno	Luciano Beretta; Guido Viezzoli	5
"Sempre con te"	Fausto Cigliano	Nilla Pizzi	Roberto Murolo	6
"Avevamo la stessa età""	Aurelio Fierro	Natalino Otto	Claudio Calcagno; Marino Marini	7
"Nessuno"	Betty Curtis	Wilma De Angelis	Antonietto De Simone; Edilio Capotosti; Vittorio Mascheroni	9
"Una marcia in Fa"	Claudio Villa & Gino Latilla	Johnny Dorelli & Betty Curtis	Mario Panzeri; Vittorio Mascheroni	9
"Un bacio sulla bocca"	Betty Curtis	Claudio Villa	Alberto Testa; Gigi Cichellero	10
"Adorami"	Nilla Pizzi	Tonina Torrielli	Gian Carlo Testoni; Umberto Fusco	Eliminated
"Così così"	Anna D’Amico	Natalino Otto	Valerio Vancheri	Eliminated
"La luna è un’altra luna"	Gino Latilla	Natalino Otto	Raoul De Giusti; Biri; Alberto Testa; Carlo Alberto Rossi	Eliminated
"Ma baciami"	Achille Togliani	Teddy Reno	Dante Panzuti; Antigono Godini; Pietro Rizza	Eliminated
"Né stelle né mare"	Arturo Testa	Fausto Cigliano	Gian Carlo Testoni; Giorgio Fabor	Eliminated
"Il nostro refrain"	Nilla Pizzi	Tonina Torrielli	Santi; Olivieri	Eliminated
"Partir con te"	Claudio Villa	Johnny Dorelli	Pino Calvi	Eliminated
"Per tutta la vita"	Wilma De Angelis	Jula de Palma	Alberto Testa; Pino Spotti	Eliminated
"Tu sei qui"	Achille Togliani	Arturo Testa	Alberto Testa; Silvano Birga	Eliminated
"La vita mi ha dato solo te"	Jula de Palma	Miranda Martino	Biagio Casalini; Marcello De Martino	Eliminated

== Broadcasts ==
=== Local broadcast ===
All shows were broadcast on Italian Television and Secondo Programma, beginning at 22:00 CET (21:00 UTC).

=== International broadcasts ===
Known details on the broadcasts in each country, including the specific broadcasting stations are shown in the tables below.

International broadcasters of the Sanremo Music Festival 1959
Country	Broadcaster	Channel(s)	Commentator(s)	Ref(s)
Austria	ORF	ORF		
Belgium	NIR/INR	NIR	Piet te Nuyl Jr.	
Belgium	NIR/INR	INR		
Denmark	Statsradiofonien	Statsradiofonien TV	Mogens Kjelstrup	
Germany	ARD	Deutsches Fernsehen		
Monaco	Radio Monte-Carlo			
Netherlands	NTS	NTS	Piet te Nuyl Jr.	
Netherlands	Radio Omroep Nieuw Guinea (Note: Delayed broadcast in a shortened format on 12 August at 7:10 (WIT))			
Netherlands Antilles	Curom (Note: Delayed broadcast on 16 February 1961 at 16:00 (ADT))			
Sweden	SR	Sveriges TV		
United Kingdom	BBC	BBC Television Service (Note: Deferred broadcast on the same day of the final at 23:05 (BST))	Tom Sloan	
