= United Kingdom in the Eurovision Song Contest 1960 =

- Eurovision Song Contest 1960
- Participating broadcaster: British Broadcasting Corporation (BBC)
- Country: United Kingdom
- Selection process: Eurovision Song Contest British Final
- Selection date: 6 February 1960

Competing entry
- Song: "Looking High, High, High"
- Artist: Bryan Johnson
- Songwriter: John Watson

Placement
- Final result: 2nd, 25 points

Participation chronology

The United Kingdom was represented at the Eurovision Song Contest 1960 with the song "Looking High, High, High", written by John Watson, and performed by Bryan Johnson. The British participating broadcaster, the British Broadcasting Corporation (BBC), selected its entry through the Eurovision Song Contest British Final. In addition, the BBC was also the host broadcaster and staged the event at the Royal Festival Hall in London, after the winner of the previous edition, Nederlandse Televisie Stichting (NTS) from the Netherlands, opted not to host the event.

== Background ==
Prior to the 1960 contest, the British Broadcasting Corporation (BBC) had participated in the Eurovision Song Contest representing the United Kingdom twice: first in 1957 with the song "All" performed by Patricia Bredin, placing 7th, and most recently in 1959 with the song "Sing, Little Birdie" performed by Pearl Carr & Teddy Johnson, placing 2nd.

== Before Eurovision ==
=== Eurovision Song Contest British Final ===
The BBC organised the national final Eurovision Song Contest British Final to select its entry for the 1960 contest. The selection consisted of two semi-finals held on 2 February and 4 February 1960, and a final held on 6 February 1960. All three shows were broadcast on BBC Television presented by David Jacobs.

The songs were evaluated by seven fifteen-member regional juries: the South of England, the Midlands, the North of England, Scotland, Wales, the West of England, and Northern Ireland.

==== Competing entries ====
Twelve songs were shortlisted by the BBC to compete in the selection. The selection notably featured Pearl Carr & Teddy Johnson, the representatives of the United Kingdom in 1959. "When the Tide Turns" was performed by Rosemary Squires in the second semi-final, but performed by Pearl Carr & Teddy Johnson in the final.

Artist	Song	Composer(s)
Benny Lee	"Friendly Street"	Colin Cleaver
Bryan Johnson	"Looking High, High, High"	John Watson
David Hughes & Jimmy Fraser	"Mi amor"	Frederick Lydiate, Harry Rabinowitz
Dennis Lotis	"Love Me a Little"	Howard Barnes, Cliff Adams
Don Lang	"As the Big Dipper Dipped"	Ken Hare
Lita Roza	"Unexpectedly"	Susan Morrel
Malcolm Vaughan	"Each Tomorrow"	Chris Charles, Ronald Bridges
Marion Keene	"Love, Kisses and Heartaches"	David Green, Susan Morrel
Pearl Carr & Teddy Johnson	"Pickin' Petals"	Stan Butcher, Syd Cordell
Rosemary Squires	"When the Tide Turns"	David West, Manioli Di Veroli
Pearl Carr & Teddy Johnson	"When the Tide Turns"	David West, Manioli Di Veroli
Ronnie Carroll	"Girl With a Curl"	Donald Phillips
Vince Eager	"Teenage Tears"	Ronald Bridges

==== Semi-final 1 ====
The first semi-final was held on 2 February 1960 at 21:15 GMT. Six songs were performed, and the highlighted songs qualified for the final.

Semi-final 1 – 2 February 1960
R/O	Artist	Song	Result
1	Don Lang	"As the Big Dipper Dipped"	—N/a
2	Benny Lee	"Friendly Street"	—N/a
3	Pearl Carr & Teddy Johnson	"Pickin' Petals"	—N/a
4	Malcolm Vaughan	"Each Tomorrow"	Qualified
5	Lita Roza	"Unexpectedly"	Qualified
6	David Hughes & Jimmy Frazer	"Mi amor"	Qualified

==== Semi-final 2 ====
The second semi-final was held on 4 February 1960 at 21:20 GMT. Six songs were performed and the top four advanced to the final, due to there being a tie for first place. The highlighted songs qualified for the final.

Semi-final 2 – 4 February 1960
R/O	Artist	Song	Result
1	Vince Eager	"Teenage Tears"	—N/a
2	Marion Keene	"Love, Kisses and Heartaches"	—N/a
3	Rosemary Squires	"When the Tide Turns"	Qualified
4	Ronnie Carroll	"Girl With a Curl"	Qualified
5	Dennis Lotis	"Love Me a Little"	Qualified
6	Bryan Johnson	"Looking High, High, High"	Qualified

==== Final ====
The final was held on 6 February 1960 at 21:30 GMT in the BBC TV Theatre in London. Seven songs were performed and "Looking High, High, High" was declared the winner.

Final – 6 February 1960
R/O	Artist	Song	Place
1	Pearl Carr & Teddy Johnson	"When the Tide Turns"	4
2	Ronnie Carroll	"Girl With a Curl"	7
3	Malcolm Vaughan	"Each Tomorrow"	3
4	David Hughes & Jimmy Frazer	"Mi amor"	2
5	Lita Roza	"Unexpectedly"	5
6	Bryan Johnson	"Looking High, High, High"	1
7	Dennis Lotis	"Love Me a Little"	6

== At Eurovision ==
On the night of the contest, "Looking High, High, High" was performed first, preceding the entry from Sweden. At the close of the voting, the United Kingdom had received 25 points, placing 2nd in a field of 13 entries.

=== Voting ===
Each country had a jury of ten people. Each juror awarded one point to their favourite song.

Points awarded to the United Kingdom
Score	Country
5 points	Luxembourg; Netherlands
4 points	Switzerland
3 points	Austria
2 points	Italy; Norway
1 point	Belgium; Germany; Monaco; Sweden

Points awarded by the United Kingdom
Score	Country
5 points	France
2 points	Austria
1 point	Denmark; Monaco; Norway
