= Romantica (song) =

1960 song by Renato Rascel

Single by Renato Rascel
- Language: Italian
- Released: 1960
- Composer: Renato Rascel
- Lyricist: Dino Verde

Eurovision Song Contest 1960 entry
- Country: Italy
- Artist: Renato Ranucci
- As: Renato Rascel
- Language: Italian
- Composer: Renato Rascel
- Lyricist: Dino Verde
- Conductor: Cinico Angelini

Finals performance
- Final result: 8th
- Final points: 5

Entry chronology
- ◄ "Piove (Ciao, ciao bambina)" (1959)
- "Al di là" (1961) ►

"Romantica" (English: "Romantic [Woman]") is a song written by Italian singer-songwriter Renato Rascel with Dino Verde. It was performed for the first time during the tenth Sanremo Music Festival in January 1960, when two different versions of the song were sung by Rascel and Tony Dallara. Rascel performed the song as a soft ballad, while Dallara, who was considered by Italian music critics as one of the urlatori ("screamers"), a music style popular in Italy during the 1960s, gave a more powerful rendition of the song.

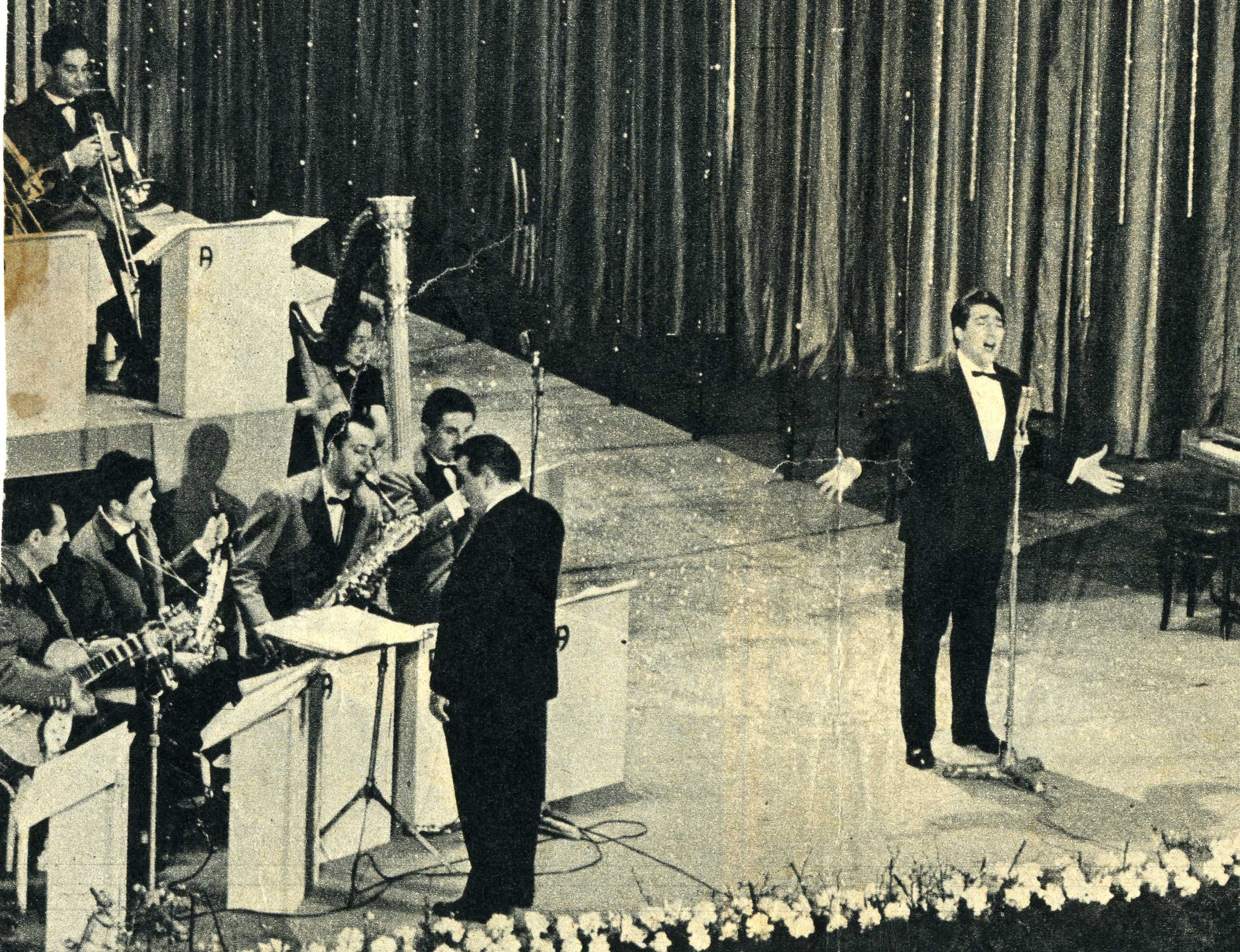
Tony Dallara singing "Romantica" at the 1960 Sanremo Music Festival, accompanied by guitarist Pino Rucher (first from left) with the Angelini Orchestra.

The song placed first in the competition and went on to be chosen as the Italian entry in the Eurovision Song Contest 1960, where it was performed in Italian by Rascel, twelfth on the night. It followed Germany's Wyn Hoop with "Bonne nuit ma chérie" and preceded France's Jacqueline Boyer with "Tom Pillibi". At the close of voting, it had received 5 points, placing it 8th in a field of 13.

The song spanned three foreign versions in 1960:

- Dalida's version topped the French charts for a week.
- The Estonian version by the Estonian Radio Male Quartet entitled "Romantika" altered the original by skipping the introduction. For two seasons of the Estonian hit comedy talk show "Rahva Oma Kaitse", this version was featured as the end title piece. One of the editors, Mart Juur, commented: "Honestly, meanwhile we haven't heard anything of the worth of Ringo Starr's 'No No Song' and 'Romantika' by the Male Quartet of the Estonian Radio. Look, there was a time when we used the so-called 'bozo' songs, but recently we've started to pay attention at the quality of our featured music!"
- Jane Morgan recorded an English version of the song just after the contest, in 1960.

Between the late 1980s and early 1990s, the Norwegian vintage band Lollipop performed and released an Italian-language version of "Romantica", with singer Tor Endresen. The band was founded by singer Rune Larsen for a vintage music show in Norway, and had become very successful with 30 episodes on TV and two tours, as well as music releases between 1955 and 1965.

As the Italian representative, "Romantica" was succeeded at the 1961 contest by Betty Curtis with "Al di là".

== Charts ==
Tony Dallara version

Chart (1960)	Peak position
Italy (Musica e dischi)	1

Dalida version

Chart (1960)	Peak position
France (IFOP)	1
Belgium (Wallonia)	1
Belgium (Flanders)	8
Spain	11
