= Denmark in the Eurovision Song Contest 1960 =

- Eurovision Song Contest 1960
- Participating broadcaster: Danmarks Radio (DR)
- Country: Denmark
- Selection process: Dansk Melodi Grand Prix 1960
- Selection date: 6 March 1960

Competing entry
- Song: "Det var en yndig tid"
- Artist: Katy Bødtger
- Songwriters: Vilfred Kjær; Sven Buemann

Placement
- Final result: 10th, 4 points

Participation chronology

Denmark was represented at the Eurovision Song Contest 1960 with the song "Det var en yndig tid", composed by Vilfred Kjær, with lyrics by Sven Buemann, and performed by Katy Bødtger. The Danish participating broadcaster, Danmarks Radio (DR), organised the Dansk Melodi Grand Prix 1960 in order to select its entry for the contest.

== Before Eurovision ==
=== Melodi Grand Prix 1960 ===
Danmarks Radio (DR) held the Dansk Melodi Grand Prix 1960 on 6 March at the Radiohuset in Copenhagen, hosted by Sejr Volmer-Sørensen. Seven songs took part, with the winner chosen by a ten-member jury each nominating their favourite song. Gustav Winckler, who represented Denmark in 1957, was among the participants.

Melodi Grand Prix - 6 March 1960
R/O	Artist	Song	Songwriter(s)	Points	Place
1	Otto Hænning	"Op og se land"	Hans-Ole Nielsen; Thøger Olesen	0	4
2	Katy Bødtger	"Det var en yndig tid"	Sven Buemann; Vilfred Kjær	5	1
3	Otto Brandenburg	"To lys på et bord"	Ida From; Bjarne Hoyer	0	4
4	Inge Strauss	"Gør hvad du vil"	Henry Hannibal	3	2
5	Gustav Winckler	"Sorg og glæder"	Vagn Skovlund	0	4
6	Grethe Sønck	"Træksbasun og vaskebræt"	Henry Hannibal	2	3
7	Peter Sørensen	"Jeg har nok af ingen penger"	Otto Lington; Thøger Olesen	0	4

== At Eurovision ==
On the evening of the final Katy Bødtger performed 4th in the running order, following Luxembourg and preceding Belgium. In style the song owed more to stage musicals than to contemporary music, and Bødtger complimented its rather quaint, old-fashioned sound by performing in a 19th-century fashioned gown, complete with bonnet and parasol. At the close of voting "Det var en yndig tid" had received 4 points, placing Denmark joint 10th (with Sweden) of the 13 entries. The Danish jury awarded its highest mark (4) to contest winners France.

The contest was televised on Danmarks Radio TV, and on radio station Program 2, both with commentary by Sejr Volmer-Sørensen.

=== Voting ===
Every participating broadcaster assembled a jury panel of ten people. Every jury member could give one point to his or her favourite song.

Points awarded to Denmark
Score	Country
2 points	Norway
1 point	Luxembourg; United Kingdom

Points awarded by Denmark
Score	Country
4 points	France
2 points	Austria; Monaco; Norway
