= Switzerland in the Eurovision Song Contest 1960 =

- Eurovision Song Contest 1960
- Participating broadcaster: Swiss Broadcasting Corporation (SRG SSR)
- Country: Switzerland
- Selection process: Schlagerwettbewerb der Eurovision
- Selection date: 29 February 1960

Competing entry
- Song: "Cielo e terra"
- Artist: Anita Traversi
- Songwriter: Mario Robbiani

Placement
- Final result: 8th, 5 points

Participation chronology

Switzerland was represented at the Eurovision Song Contest 1960 with the song "Cielo e terra", written by Mario Robbiani and performed by Anita Traversi. The Swiss participating broadcaster, the Swiss Broadcasting Corporation (SRG SSR), selected its entry through a national final.

== Before Eurovision ==
=== Schlagerwettbewerb der Eurovision ===
The Swiss Broadcasting Corporation (SRG SSR) held a national final to select its entry for the Eurovision Song Contest 1960. Nine songs were chosen to participate in the selection; three of which were each in French, German, and Italian. Five artists competed to represent Switzerland, among whom were Fud Leclerc— who represented Belgium in 1956, 1958, and this year, where he was already selected and would repeat this in 1962, and Anita Traversi— who previously represented Switzerland in 1956 as one of the members of Quinteto Radiosa, the backing vocals for the Swiss entries.

Competing entries
Broadcaster	Artist	Song	Songwriter(s)		Language
Broadcaster	Artist	Song	Composer	Lyricist	Language
TSR	Fud Leclerc	"Attrap'ça"	Géo Voumard	Émile Gardaz	French
TSR	Fud Leclerc	"La java sans tralala"	Jean-Pierre Moulin		French
TSR	Fud Leclerc	"Chin chin"	Dominique Roland		French
TSI	Anita Traversi	"Malcantonesina"	Vittorio Castelnuovo		Italian
TSI	Anita Traversi	"Cielo e terra"	Mario Robbiani		Italian
TSI	Gianni Ferraresi	"É stata quí"	Giovanni Pelli		Italian
DRS	Jo Roland	"Madrigal"	Carlo Loebnitz		German
DRS	Jo Roland	"Chérie, chérie"	Tibor Kasics	Fredy Lienhard	German (Note: Title is in French, however the composers both composed Swiss-German songs)
DRS	Bianca Cavallini	"Frühling"	Hans Moeckel	Werner Wollenberger	German

Swiss German and Romansh broadcaster Schweizer Fernsehen der deutschen und rätoromanischen Schweiz (SF DRS) staged the national final on 29 February 1960 at 21:00 CET (20:00 UTC) in the Stadtcasino in Basel. It was presented by Colette Jean and musically directed by Cédric Dumont, with Iller Pattacini accompanying the orchestra.

The voting consisted of a ten-member "expert" jury, whose members each gave one vote to their desired song. The jurors were split from the three regions of Switzerland, featuring four representatives from the Swiss-German region and three from Romandy (Swiss-French region) and Ticino (Swiss-Italian region). The winner was the song "Cielo e terra", written and composed by Mario Robbiani and performed by Anita Traversi. It is known that the winning song received 7 out of the ten jury votes, however it's unknown which song(s) received the remaining 3 votes.

Final – 29 February 1960
R/O	Artist	Song	Votes	Total
1	Fud Leclerc	"Attrap'ça"	Unknown	
2	Anita Traversi	"Malcantonesina"	Unknown	
3	Jo Roland	"Madrigal"	Unknown	
4	Fud Leclerc	"La java sans tralala"	Unknown	
5	Bianca Cavallini	"Frühling"	Unknown	
6	Gianni Ferraresi	"É stata quí"	Unknown	
7	Anita Traversi	"Cielo e terra"	7	1
8	Fud Leclerc	"Chin chin"	Unknown	
9	Jo Roland	"Chérie, chérie"	Unknown	

=== Releases ===
Anita Traversi recorded and released "Cielo e terra" in a single titled after the song in 1960. In 1998, the song was featured in a CD compilation titled "Concours Eurovision De La Chanson 1956-1998: Schweizer Beiträge", which compiled every Swiss Eurovision entry at the time.

The only other song to be commercially released by its performer was "É stata quí" by Gianni Ferraresi, which was released the same year. Several covers of "Malcantonesina" have been released over the years, as it became a popular Ticinese folk song, notably by the Quartetto di Biasca, in which the songwriter, Vittorio Castelnuovo sang alongside them. Although, Traversi never commercially released the song herself, an audio recording of her performance in the selection was released by SRF in 2017.

== At Eurovision ==
At the Eurovision Song Contest 1960 in London, the Swiss entry was the ninth song of the night following Monaco and preceding the Netherlands. The Swiss entry was conducted by Cédric Dumont, who served as the musical director in the national final. At the close of voting, Switzerland had received five points in total, and the country finished joint eighth among the thirteen participants.

The contest was broadcast on SRG SSR via TV DRS and Radio Beromünster (with commentary from Theodor Haller) in German-speaking Switzerland, TSR and Radio Sottens in Romandy, and TSI and Radio Monte Ceneri in Ticino.

=== Voting ===
Each participating broadcaster assembled a ten-member jury panel. Every jury member could give one point to their favourite song.

Points awarded to Switzerland
Score	Country
2 points	Austria
1 point	Italy; Luxembourg; Norway

Points awarded by Switzerland
Score	Country
4 points	Norway; United Kingdom
1 point	France; Monaco
