= Canzonissima =

Italian musical variety TV show

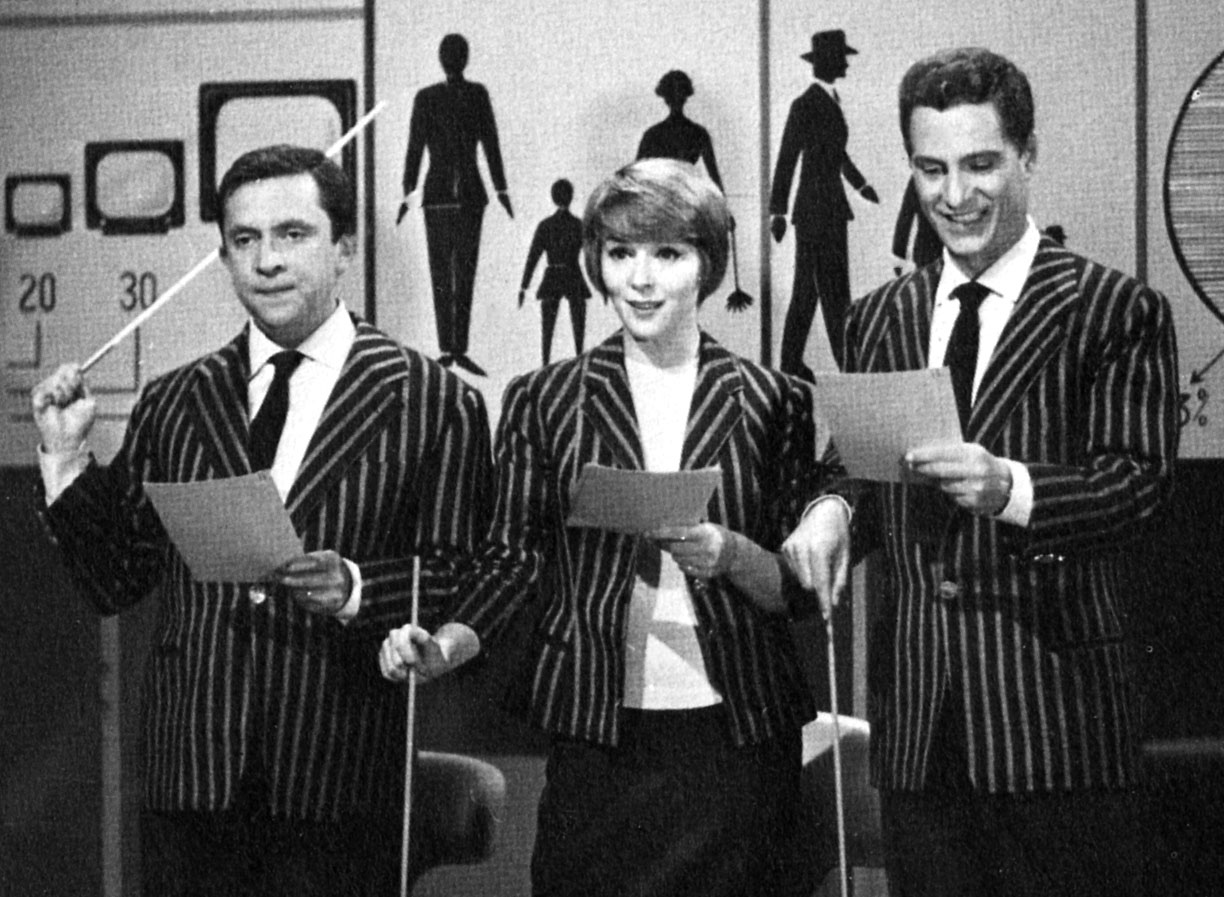
- Paolo Panelli, Delia Scala and Nino Manfredi hosting Canzonissima in 1959
- Genre: Musical, variety show
- Directed by: Antonello Falqui; Mario Landi; Eros Macchi; Vito Molonari; Romolo Siena
- Presented by: Renato Tagliani; Ugo Tognazzi; Walter Chiari; Gianni Agus; Enza Soldi; Lauretta Masiero; Scilla Gabel; Corrado Pani; Delia Scala; Paolo Panelli; Nino Manfredi; Don Lurio; Alberto Lionello; Aroldo Tieri; Lilli Lembo; Sandra Mondaini; Enzo Garinei; Toni Ucci; Carlo Sposito; Anna Maria Gambineri; Paolo Poli; Alberto Bonucci; Tino Buazzelli; Dario Fo; Franca Rame; Maria Grazia Picchetti; Tino Buazzelli; Corrado Mantoni; Mina; Johnny Dorelli; Raimondo Vianello; Alice Kessler; Ellen Kessler; Paolo Villaggio; Raffaella Carrà; Alighiero Noschese; Pippo Baudo; Loretta Goggi; Vittorio Gassman; Mita Medici; Mike Bongiorno; Cochi Ponzoni; Renato Pozzetto; Topo Gigio; Milly Carlucci
- Country of origin: Italy
- Original language: Italian
- No. of seasons: 13
- No. of episodes: 161

Production
- Production company: RAI

Original release
- Network: Programma Nazionale
- Release: 22 October 1958 – 6 January 1975
- Network: Rai 1
- Release: 21 March – 25 April 2026

Canzonissima (Italian: [kantsoˈnissima]; transl. "[The] Utmost Song") is an Italian musical variety show originally broadcast by Rai 1 from 1958 to 1975, aired on Saturday evenings except for the last two editions, which were aired on Sunday afternoon. The program has been referred to as "the synthesis and paradigm of Italian television variety".

During its last six editions (1969–1974), the show constituted the national selection for the artist that would represent Italy in the Eurovision Song Contest the following year. A reboot of the show has been airing since March 2026.

== History ==
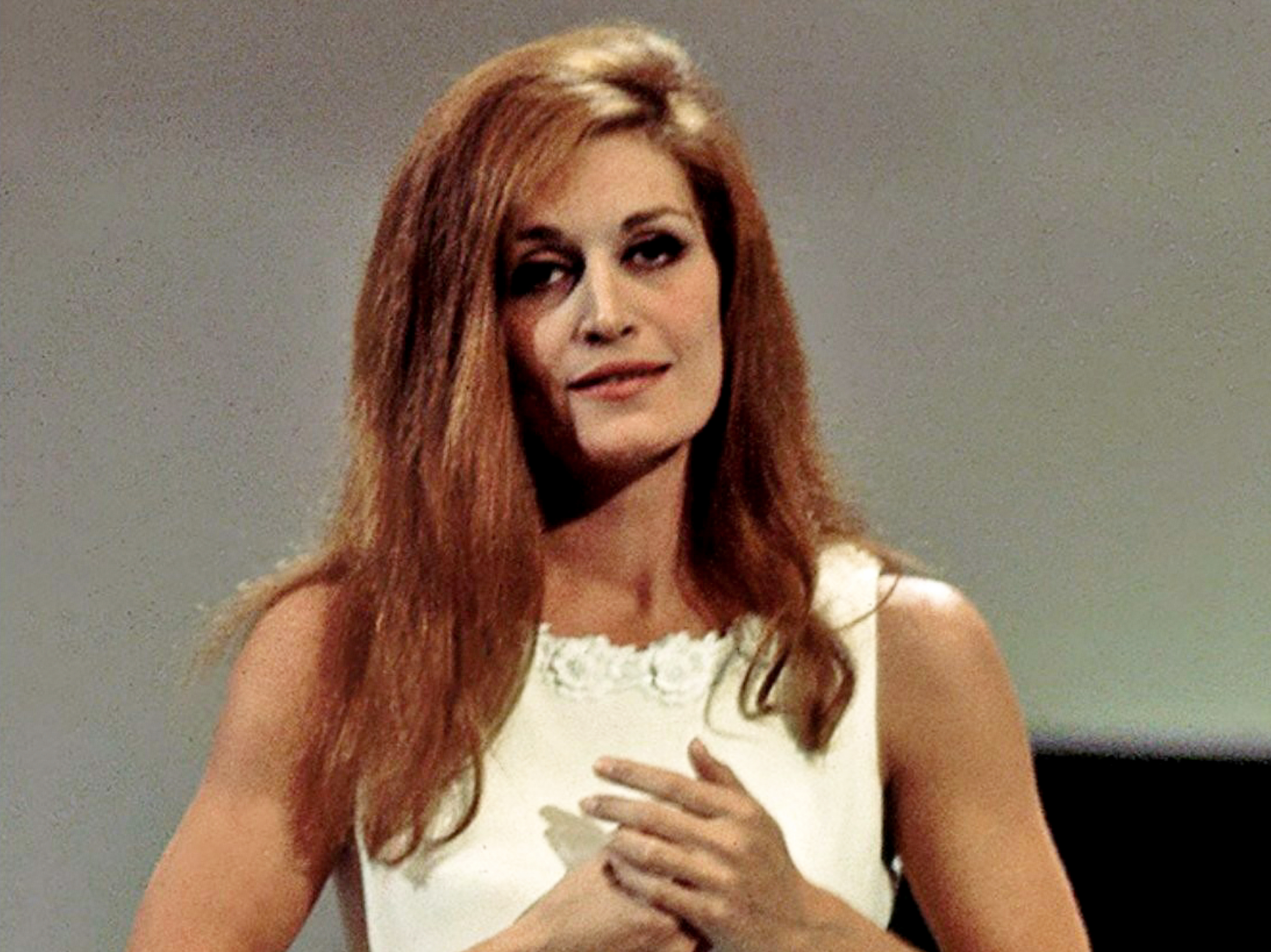
Dalida won the 1967 finals with "Dan dan dan", a song that reflected her recent loss of her unborn child.

Originating in radio as a song tournament in 1956, with the title Le canzoni della fortuna ("The songs of fortune"), it shortly gained great public success. The following year it was brought on television titled Voci e volti della fortuna ("Voices and faces of fortune") and turned into a competition between amateurs from the various regions of Italy, with the participation of some professional singers, who competed in a separate group. In 1958, the variety took its definitive name Canzonissima, with exception of 1963–1967 when the broadcast bore different titles: Gran Premio, Napoli contro tutti, La prova del nove, Scala reale and Partitissima.

The show consisted of a musical contest where singers were paired with some national lottery numbers and which followed elaborate rules, generally different from one edition to another; the competition was interspersed with dances and comedy sketches involving special guests.

The 1959 and 1970 editions contributed to the launch of the careers of Nino Manfredi and Raffaella Carrà, respectively. The 1962 edition, hosted by Dario Fo and Franca Rame, generated large political controversities due to some of Fo's satirical sketches being censored by RAI; the couple was eventually fired, and the scandal lead to a five-year interruption of their collaboration with the broadcaster.

In 2026, Rai announced a new edition of the popolar programme, hosted by Milly Carlucci.

== Editions ==
#	Year	Presenters	Winner(s)
(Note: The two original editions, usually not counted as part of the programme, consisted of a radio contest titled Le canzoni della fortuna.)	1956	Adriana Serra, Antonella Steni, Raffaele Pisu and Renato Turi	"Mamma" (Nunzio Gallo) and "Buon anno, buona fortuna" (Gino Latilla)
(Note: The two original editions, usually not counted as part of the programme, consisted of a radio contest titled Le canzoni della fortuna.)	1957	Enzo Tortora, Silvio Noto, Antonella Steni and Renato Turi	"Scapricciatiello" (Aurelio Fierro)
1	1958	Renato Tagliani with Walter Chiari, Raimondo Vianello, Lauretta Masiero, Scilla Gabel and Corrado Pani	"L'edera" (Nilla Pizzi)
2	1959	Delia Scala, Paolo Panelli and Nino Manfredi	"Piove" (Joe Sentieri)
3	1960	Alberto Lionello, Lauretta Masiero, Aroldo Tieri and Lilli Lembo	"Romantica" (Tony Dallara)
4	1961	Sandra Mondaini, Enzo Garinei, Toni Ucci, Carletto Sposito and Anna Maria Gambineri, with Paolo Poli, Alberto Bonucci and Tino Buazzelli	"Bambina bambina" (Tony Dallara)
5	1962	Dario Fo and Franca Rame, then Tino Buazzelli, Sandra Mondaini and Corrado	"Quando, quando, quando" (Tony Renis)
(Note: This edition, titled Gran Premio, saw a competition among the regions of Italy.)	1963	Various (one for each region of Italy)	Sicily
(Note: This edition, titled Napoli contro tutti, saw a competition between Naples (represented by a Neapolitan song) and the remaining cities of Italy.)	1964	Nino Taranto and Nadia Gray	"'O sole mio" (Claudio Villa)
(Note: This edition was titled La prova del nove.)	1965	Corrado with Walter Chiari and Kessler Twins	"Non son degno di te" (Gianni Morandi)
(Note: This edition was titled Scala reale.)	1966	Peppino De Filippo	"Granada" (Claudio Villa)
(Note: This edition was titled Partitissima.)	1967	Alberto Lupo, Franco and Ciccio	"Dan dan dan" (Dalida)
6	1968	Mina, Walter Chiari and Paolo Panelli	"Scende la pioggia" (Gianni Morandi)
7	1969	Johnny Dorelli, Raimondo Vianello and Kessler Twins, with Sandra Mondaini and Paolo Villaggio	"Ma chi se ne importa" (Gianni Morandi)
8	1970	Corrado and Raffaella Carrà	"Vent'anni" (Massimo Ranieri)
9	1971	Corrado and Raffaella Carrà, with Alighiero Noschese	"Chitarra suona più piano" (Nicola Di Bari)
10	1972	Pippo Baudo and Loretta Goggi	"Erba di casa mia" (Massimo Ranieri)
11	1973	Pippo Baudo and Mita Medici	"Alle porte del sole" (Gigliola Cinquetti)
12	1974	Raffaella Carrà, Cochi e Renato and Mike Bongiorno	"Un corpo e un'anima" (Wess & Dori Ghezzi)
13	2026	Milly Carlucci	"Il mio canto libero" (Fabrizio Moro)
