= Dino Verde =

Italian composer

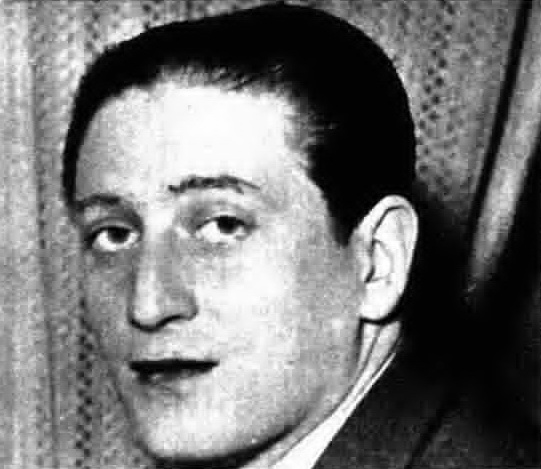
- Dino Verde in Radiocorriere magazine (1955)
- Born: 13 July 1922; Naples, Italy
- Died: 1 February 2004 (aged 81); Rome, Italy
- Occupation: Writer

Dino Verde (13 July 1922 – 1 February 2004) was an Italian author, lyricist, playwright and screenwriter.

== Life and career ==
Born Edoardo Verde in Naples, in 1943 he started working in the satirical magazine Marc'Aurelio. Since the late 1940s Verde wrote revues and comedy plays for the most popular comedians of the time, including Macario, Nino Taranto, Aldo Fabrizi, Mario Riva and Riccardo Billi, Carlo Dapporto. In 1949 he started collaborating with EIAR, where he specialized in writing sketches and parody songs.

Active on television since 1955, he was author of some of the most popular RAI variety shows, such as Canzonissima, Doppia coppia and Studio Uno.

Verde was also a successful songwriter; he wrote lyrics for two Sanremo Music Festival winning songs, "Piove (Ciao, ciao bambina)" by Domenico Modugno/Johnny Dorelli and "Romantica" by Renato Rascel/Tony Dallara. Other hits include Modugno's "Resta cu'mme", Kessler Twins' "Dadaumpa", Rita Pavone's "Il ballo del mattone", Mina's "Una zebra a pois", Sophia Loren's "Che m'è 'mparato a fa".

His last work was the 2004 stage play "Bentornato avanspettacolo".

His son Gustavo is also a television author.

== Selected filmography ==
- I, Hamlet (1952)
- If You Won a Hundred Million (1953)
- Rascel-Fifì (1957)
- Husbands in the City (1957)
- Cerasella (1959)
- Ciao, ciao bambina! (1959)
- Uncle Was a Vampire (1959)
- Il vedovo (1959)
- Noi siamo due evasi (1959)
- Tough Guys (1960)
- I due toreri (1965)
- Two Mafiosi Against Goldfinger (1965)
- I due sanculotti (1966)
- I barbieri di Sicilia (1967)
- Argoman the Fantastic Superman (1967)
- Dirty Heroes (1967)
- The Nephews of Zorro (1968)
- The Two Crusaders (1968)
- Zingara (1969)
- Satiricosissimo (1970)
- I due assi del guantone (1971)
- Ma che musica maestro (1971)
- House of 1000 Pleasures (1973)
