= Eurovision Song Contest 1960 =

International song competition

Coordinates: 51°30′21.01″N 0°07′00.44″W

Date and venue
- Final: 29 March 1960
- Venue: Royal Festival Hall; London, United Kingdom

Organisation
- Organiser: European Broadcasting Union (EBU)

Production
- Host broadcaster: British Broadcasting Corporation (BBC)
- Director: Innes Lloyd
- Executive producer: Harry Carlisle
- Musical director: Eric Robinson
- Presenter: Catherine Boyle

Participants
- Number of entries: 13
- Debuting countries: Norway
- Returning countries: Luxembourg
- Participation map: Participating countries

Vote
- Voting system: Ten-member juries in each country; each member gave one vote to their favourite song
- Winning song: France "Tom Pillibi"

The Eurovision Song Contest 1960 was the fifth edition of the Eurovision Song Contest, held on Tuesday 29 March 1960 at the Royal Festival Hall in London, United Kingdom, and presented by Catherine Boyle. It was organised by the European Broadcasting Union (EBU) and host broadcaster the British Broadcasting Corporation (BBC), who staged the event after Nederlandse Televisie Stichting (NTS), which had won the 1959 contest for the Netherlands, declined hosting responsibilities as it had staged the competition in 1958.

Broadcasters from thirteen countries participated in the contest. Luxembourg returned to the competition after an absence of one year, and Norway made its first appearance.

The winner was France with the song "Tom Pillibi", performed by Jacqueline Boyer, composed by André Popp and written by Pierre Cour. This marked France's second contest victory, having also won in 1958. The United Kingdom, Monaco, Norway and Germany rounded out the top five. This was the United Kingdom's second consecutive runner-up finish and Monaco's first top three finish in the competition.

== Location ==
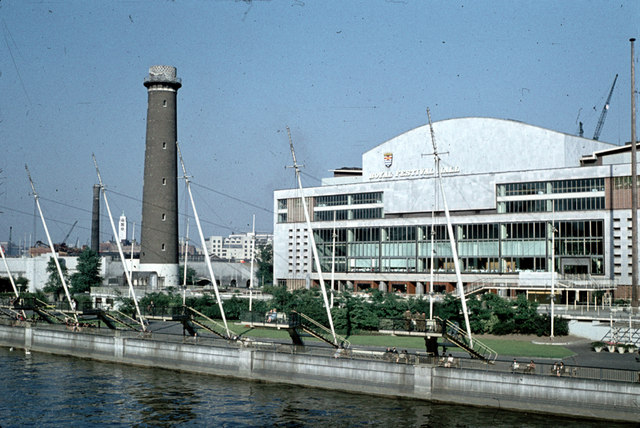
Royal Festival Hall, London – host venue of the 1960 contest

The contest took place in London, United Kingdom. Although the Netherlands had won the 1959 contest, the Dutch broadcaster Nederlandse Televisie Stichting (NTS) declined to stage the event for a second time in three years, after hosting the 1958 edition in Hilversum. The rights to stage the contest subsequently passed to the United Kingdom's British Broadcasting Corporation (BBC), following its second-place finish in the previous year's event, a decision which was announced in October 1959.

The Royal Festival Hall was chosen to stage the 1960 contest. Situated on the South Bank of the River Thames, the venue was first opened in 1951 and was originally conceived for use during that year's Festival of Britain; it is now part of the Southbank Centre, a complex of several artistic venues.

== Participants ==
Eurovision Song Contest 1960 – Participation summaries by country
- Austria; Belgium; Denmark; France; Germany; Italy; Luxembourg; Monaco; Netherlands; Norway; Sweden; Switzerland; United Kingdom

The number of entries grew to thirteen for this edition, with the eleven competing countries from the 1959 contest being joined by Luxembourg, returning after a one-year absence, and Norway, making its first appearance.

Fud Leclerc made his third appearance at the contest, having represented Belgium in 1956 with "Messieurs les noyés de la Seine" (one of the two Belgian entries in that year's contest) and in 1958 with "Ma petite chatte". The song from Luxembourg was the first entry performed in Luxembourgish at the contest, and one of only three entries performed in the language (alongside the country's entries in 1992 and 1993).

Eurovision Song Contest 1960 participants
Country	Broadcaster	Artist	Song	Language	Songwriter(s)	Conductor
Austria	ORF	Harry Winter	"Du hast mich so fasziniert"	German	Robert Gilbert; Robert Stolz	Robert Stolz
Belgium	INR	Fud Leclerc	"Mon amour pour toi"	French	Robert Montal; Jack Say	Henri Segers
Denmark	DR	Katy Bødtger	"Det var en yndig tid"	Danish	Sven Buemann; Vilfred Kjær	Kai Mortensen
France	RTF	Jacqueline Boyer	"Tom Pillibi"	French	Pierre Cour; André Popp	Franck Pourcel
Germany	HR (Note: On behalf of the German public broadcasting consortium ARD)	Wyn Hoop	"Bonne nuit ma chérie"	German	Franz Josef Breuer; Kurt Schwabach	Franz Josef Breuer
Italy	RAI	Renato Rascel	"Romantica"	Italian	Renato Rascel; Dino Verde	Cinico Angelini
Luxembourg	CLT	Camillo Felgen	"So laang we's du do bast"	Luxembourgish	Henri Moots; Jean Roderès	Eric Robinson
Monaco	TMC	François Deguelt	"Ce soir-là"	French	Pierre Dorsey; Hubert Giraud	Raymond Lefèvre
Netherlands	NTS	Rudi Carrell	"Wat een geluk"	Dutch	Willy van Hemert; Dick Schallies	Dolf van der Linden
Norway	NRK	Nora Brockstedt	"Voi-voi"	Norwegian	Georg Elgaaen	Øivind Bergh
Sweden	SR	Siw Malmkvist	"Alla andra får varann"	Swedish	Åke Gerhard; Ulf Källqvist	Thore Ehrling
Switzerland	SRG SSR	Anita Traversi	"Cielo e terra"	Italian	Mario Robbiani	Cédric Dumont
United Kingdom	BBC	Bryan Johnson	"Looking High, High, High"	English	John Watson	Eric Robinson

== Format ==
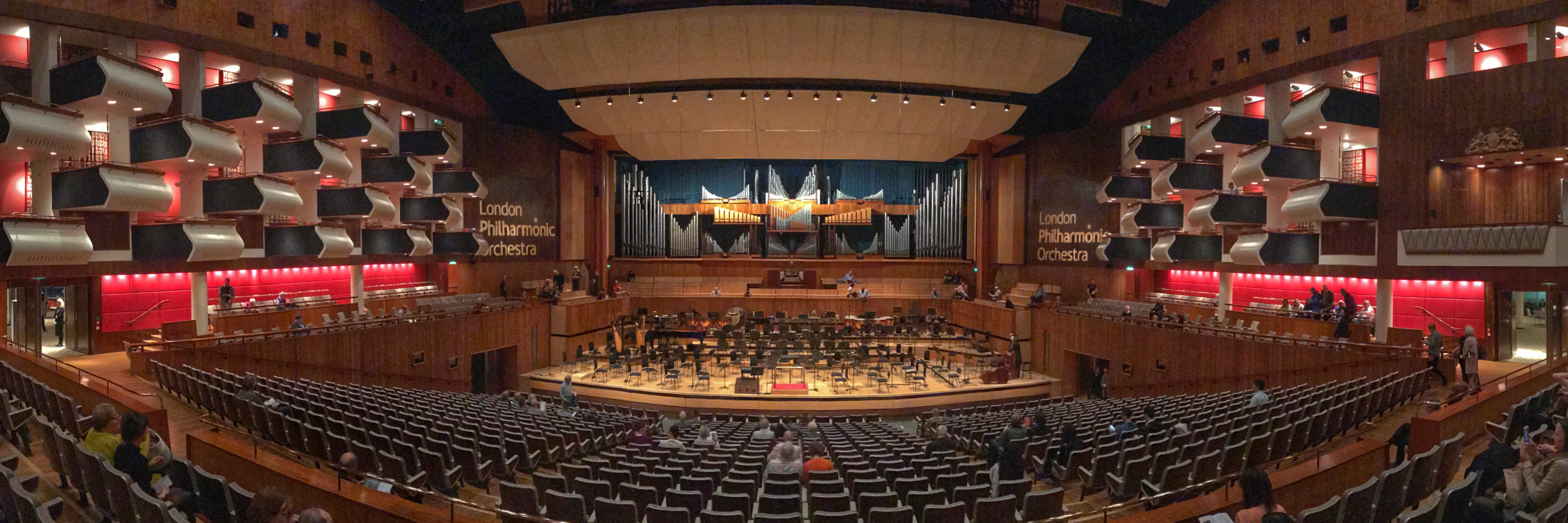
The Royal Festival Hall auditorium (pictured in 2017)

The contest was organised and broadcast by the BBC, with Harry Carlisle serving as producer, Innes Lloyd as director, Richard Levin as designer, and Eric Robinson as musical director, leading the orchestra during the event. Each participating delegation was allowed to nominate its own musical director to lead the orchestra during the performance of its country's entry, with the host musical director, Eric Robinson, also conducting for those countries which did not nominate their own conductor.

As had been the case since the 1957 contest, each country, participating through a single EBU member broadcaster, was represented by one song performed by up to two people on stage. The results of the event were determined through jury voting, with each country's jury containing ten individuals who each gave one vote to their favourite song, with no abstentions allowed and with jurors unable to vote for their own country. A new innovation for this year's event was to allow the national juries to listen to the final rehearsal of each country, which was also recorded to allow jury members to listen to the entries ahead of the live contest.

The draw to determine the order in which each country would perform was conducted on 28 March in the presence of the performers. Performance and technical rehearsals involving the artists and orchestra were held on 28 and 29 March ahead of the live transmission.

== Contest overview ==
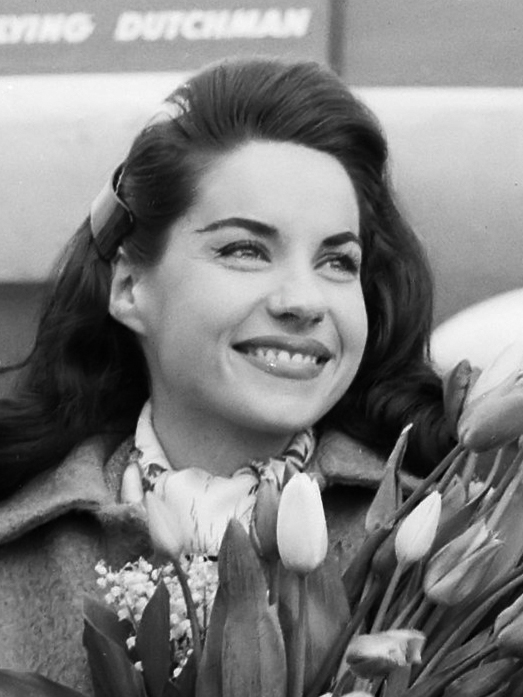
Jacqueline Boyer, the winner of the Eurovision Song Contest 1960

The contest was held on 29 March 1960 at 21:00 (GMT) and lasted 1 hour and 20 minutes. The contest was presented by British television presenter and actress Catherine Boyle (better known as Katie Boyle), the first of four contests in which she participated as host. Boyle presided over the opening of the contest and the voting process, while the various national broadcasters that carried the show provided commentary between each act, with the United Kingdom's commentator David Jacobs also being heard by the assembled audience of over 2,500 people in the hall.

The winner was France represented by the song "Tom Pillibi", composed by André Popp, written by Pierre Cour and performed by Jacqueline Boyer. Boyer is the daughter of Jacques Pills, who had represented Monaco in the previous year's contest and placed last with "Mon ami Pierrot". France's victory was its second in the contest, following its win in 1958, and brought them level on number of victories with the Netherlands. The UK gained its second consecutive second-place finish, while Monaco considerably improved upon its debut performance the previous year with a third-place finish.

It was originally planned for the top three songs to be performed again following the voting, as had occurred in the 1959 contest, however this was ultimately scrapped and only the winning song received its traditional reprise performance. The winning artist was presented with a silver gilt vase, which was awarded by Teddy Scholten; this marked the first time that the previous year's winning artist awarded the prize to the next contest winner, which has since become Eurovision tradition.

Results of the Eurovision Song Contest 1960
R/O	Country	Artist	Song	Votes	Place
1	United Kingdom	Bryan Johnson	"Looking High, High, High"	25	2
2	Sweden	Siw Malmkvist	"Alla andra får varann"	4	10
3	Luxembourg	Camillo Felgen	"So laang we's du do bast"	1	13
4	Denmark	Katy Bødtger	"Det var en yndig tid"	4	10
5	Belgium	Fud Leclerc	"Mon amour pour toi"	9	6
6	Norway	Nora Brockstedt	"Voi-voi"	11	4
7	Austria	Harry Winter	"Du hast mich so fasziniert"	6	7
8	Monaco	François Deguelt	"Ce soir-là"	15	3
9	Switzerland	Anita Traversi	"Cielo e terra"	5	8
10	Netherlands	Rudi Carrell	"Wat een geluk"	2	12
11	Germany	Wyn Hoop	"Bonne nuit ma chérie"	11	4
12	Italy	Renato Rascel	"Romantica"	5	8
13	France	Jacqueline Boyer	"Tom Pillibi"	32	1

=== Spokespersons ===
Each participating broadcaster appointed a spokesperson who was responsible for announcing the votes for its respective country via telephone. Known spokespersons at the 1960 contest are listed below.

- Netherlands – Siebe van der Zee
- Sweden – Tage Danielsson
- United Kingdom – Nick Burrell-Davis

== Detailed voting results ==
The announcement of the results from each country was conducted in reverse order to the order in which each country performed.

Detailed voting results of the Eurovision Song Contest 1960
		Total score	France	Italy	Germany	Netherlands	Switzerland	Monaco	Austria	Norway	Belgium	Denmark	Luxembourg	Sweden	United Kingdom
Contestants	United Kingdom	25		2	1	5	4	1	3	2	1		5	1	
Contestants	Sweden	4	2	1		1									
Contestants	Luxembourg	1		1											
Contestants	Denmark	4								2			1		1
Contestants	Belgium	9		3	1				1					4	
Contestants	Norway	11	1			1	4		1		1	2			1
Contestants	Austria	6		1							1	2			2
Contestants	Monaco	15	3		7		1					2	1		1
Contestants	Switzerland	5		1					2	1			1		
Contestants	Netherlands	2		1							1				
Contestants	Germany	11	4					2	2		2			1	
Contestants	Italy	5				1		2			1		1		
Contestants	France	32			1	2	1	5	1	5	3	4	1	4	5

== Broadcasts ==
Broadcasters competing in the event were required to relay the contest via its networks; non-participating EBU member broadcasters were also able to relay the contest. Broadcasters were able to send commentators to provide coverage of the contest in their own native language and to relay information about the artists and songs to their television viewers. An estimated audience of 30 million would see the contest.

Known details on the broadcasts in each country, including the specific broadcasting stations and commentators are shown in the tables below.

Broadcasters and commentators in participating countries
Country	Broadcaster	Channel(s)	Commentator(s)	Ref.
Austria	ORF	ORF		
Belgium	NIR/INR	INR	Pierre Tchernia	
Belgium	NIR/INR	NIR	Nic Bal	
Denmark	DR	Danmarks Radio TV, Program 2	Sejr Volmer-Sørensen	
France	RTF	RTF	Pierre Tchernia	
Germany	ARD	Deutsches Fernsehen	Wolf Mittler	
Italy	RAI	RAI Televisione, Secondo Programma	Giorgio Porro	
Luxembourg	CLT	Télé-Luxembourg		
Netherlands	NTS	NTS	Piet te Nuyl Jr.	
Netherlands	KRO	Hilversum 2 (Note: Deferred broadcast at 22:40 (CET))		
Norway	NRK	NRK Fjernsynet, NRK	Erik Diesen	
Sweden	SR	Sveriges TV, SR P2	Jan Gabrielsson	
Switzerland	SRG SSR	TV DRS, Radio Beromünster	Theodor Haller	
Switzerland	SRG SSR	TSR, Radio Sottens		
Switzerland	SRG SSR	TSI, Radio Monte Ceneri		
United Kingdom	BBC	BBC Television Service	David Jacobs	

Broadcasters and commentators in non-participating countries
Country	Broadcaster	Channel(s)	Commentator(s)	Ref.
Finland	YLE	Suomen Televisio	Aarno Walli	
Netherlands Antilles	RNW (Note: Delayed broadcast in Curaçao in a shortened format on 2 April 1960 at 19:20 (ADT))			

== Notes and references ==
=== Bibliography ===
- O'Connor, John Kennedy (2010). The Eurovision Song Contest: The Official History (2nd ed.). London, United Kingdom: Carlton Books. ISBN 978-1-84732-521-1.
- Pajala, Mari (2013). "Intervision Song Contests and Finnish Television between East and West". In Badenoch, Alexander; Fickers, Andreas; Henrich-Franke, Christian (eds.). Airy Curtains in the European Ether: Broadcasting and the Cold War. Baden-Baden, Germany: Nomos. pp. 215–270. doi:10.5771/9783845236070-215. ISBN 9783845236070.
- Roxburgh, Gordon (2012). Songs for Europe: The United Kingdom at the Eurovision Song Contest. Vol. One: The 1950s and 1960s. Prestatyn, United Kingdom: Telos Publishing. ISBN 978-1-84583-065-6.
- Thorsson, Leif; Verhage, Martin (2006). Melodifestivalen genom tiderna : de svenska uttagningarna och internationella finalerna [Melodifestivalen through the ages: the Swedish selections and international finals] (in Swedish). Stockholm, Sweden: Premium Publishing. ISBN 91-89136-29-2.
