= Katy Bødtger =

Danish singer

- Born: 28 December 1932; Nørrebro, Copenhagen, Denmark
- Died: 1 May 2017 (aged 84)
- Occupation: Singer

Katy Bødtger (28 December 1932 – 1 May 2017) was a Danish singer.

== Eurovision Song Contest 1960 ==
In 1960, Bødtger won the Dansk Melodi Grand Prix with the song "Det var en yndig tid" (It was a lovely time). Later on that year Bødtger sang the song at the Eurovision Song Contest 1960, coming joint tenth place with the Swedish entry "Alla andra får varann" (All the others get each other) sung by Siw Malmkvist, receiving four points.

== Discography ==
- Hjertenes Jul (1964)
- Katy ’75 (1975)
- Til Stille Timer
- Du Dejlige Danske Sang (1994)
- Juletræet med sin pynt
- Jeg vil takke livet
- Blå Viol (2005)

Preceded by Birthe Wilke with Uh, jeg ville ønske jeg var dig	Denmark in the Eurovision Song Contest; 1960	Succeeded by Dario Campeotto with Angelique
