= Netherlands in the Eurovision Song Contest 1960 =

- Eurovision Song Contest 1960
- Participating broadcaster: Nederlandse Televisie Stichting (NTS)
- Country: Netherlands
- Selection process: Nationaal Songfestival 1960
- Selection date: 9 February 1960

Competing entry
- Song: "Wat een geluk"
- Artist: Rudi Carrell
- Songwriters: Dick Schallies; Willy van Hemert

Placement
- Final result: 12th, 2 points

Participation chronology

The Netherlands was represented at the Eurovision Song Contest 1960 with the song "Wat een geluk", composed by Dick Schallies, with lyrics by Willy van Hemert, and performed by Rudi Carrell. The Dutch participating Broadcaster, Nederlandse Televisie Stichting (NTS), selected its entry through a national final.

Although Teddy Scholten had won the previous contest for the Netherlands, NTS declined to host the contest for a second time in two years, so 1959 runners-up the United Kingdom had agreed to host the 1960 contest, which was staged by the BBC at London's Royal Festival Hall.

Song and singer were chosen independently of each other at the Dutch national final, held on 9 February at 21:00 CET (UTC 20:00). Other participants included future Dutch representatives Greetje Kauffeld (1961) and Annie Palmen (1963).

== Before Eurovision ==
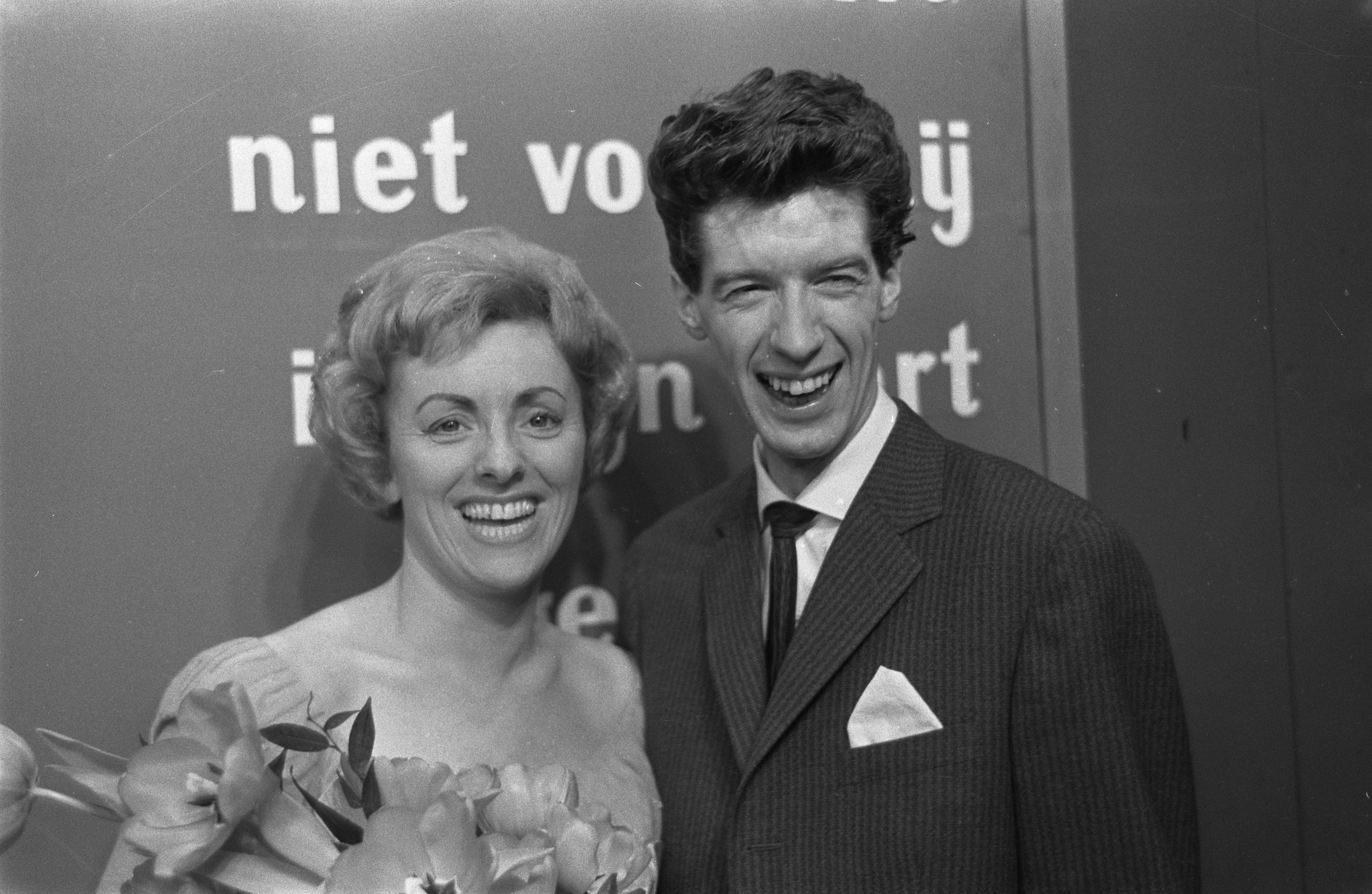
Rudi Carrell (right, pictured with Annie Palmen) was selected to represent Netherlands in 1960

Nederlandse Televisie Stichting (NTS) received 340 submissions for the national final, more than in previous years. Eight of them were chosen for the national final. The national final was also broadcast in Curaçao on RNW, just a few days after it was held.

=== Nationaal Songfestival 1960 ===
The national final took place at the AVRO Studios in Hilversum. It was produced by Piet de Nuyl Jr., directed by Leen Timp and hosted by Hannie Lips. Eight songs were involved, with all songs presented twice by different performers. In the first round, half of the songs, "Carrousel", "Niet voor mij", "Regenkapje", and "Vanavond" were performed with a full orchestra, the Metropole Orkest under the direction of Dolf van der Linden, while the other fours songs, "Addio", "In mijn hart", "Wat een geluk" and "Ik leef" were presented in a more pared-down style, with an ensemble led by Eddy de Jong. In the second round, in a different running order, all songs previously presented with the orchestra were now presented with the ensemble, and vice-versa.

The format was basically the same as that used in 1959, apart from the fact that this year each singer performed only once so there were 16 participants in total.

As an interval act between round 1 and 2, the Metropole Orkest played "When Johnny comes marching home", and after round 2 "Jungle Drums" composed by Ernesto Lecuona.

The winning song was chosen by votes from twelve regional juries, each of them consisting of ten television viewers. The regional juries were located in Boekelo, Boxtel, Coevorden, Drachten, Emmeloord, Rotterdam, Groningen, Gulpen, Yerseke, Nijmegen, Zaandam, and Zeist. Then an "expert" jury decided which of the two performers of the winning song should go to London. This expert jury consisted of René van Vooren (jury president), Gijs Stappershoef, Jo Calff, Conny Stuart, and Andrea Domburg.

After "Wat een geluk", written by Willy van Hemert and Dick Schallies, was announced as the winning song, the expert jury unanimously chose Carrell over Palmen as the singer.

Nationaal Songfestival 1960 – 9 February 1960
First performance		Second performance		Song	Points	Place
R/O	Artist 1	R/O	Artist 2	Song	Points	Place
1	Marcel Thielemans	7	John de Mol	"Carrousel"	86	4
2	Betty Luske	4	Tonny van Hulst	"Addio"	110	2
3	Greetje Kauffeld	5	Piet Sybrandy	"Niet voor mij"	99	3
4	Herman Emmink	2	Jan van de Most	"In mijn hart"	77	5
5	Karel van der Velden	3	Rita Huyskens	"Regenkapje"	35	7
6	Annie Palmen	8	Rudi Carrell	"Wat een geluk"	225	1
7	Jaap Dubbelboer	1	Joop Smits	"Vanavond"	27	8
8	Wim van der Beek	6	Jany Bron	"Ik leef"	61	6

== At Eurovision ==
Carrell performing at the final

On the night of the final Rudi Carrell performed 10th in the running order, following Switzerland and preceding Germany. At the close of voting "Wat een geluk" had received 2 points, placing the Netherlands 12th of the 13 entries, ahead only of Luxembourg. The Dutch jury awarded its highest mark (5) to the United Kingdom.

The Dutch conductor at the contest was Dolf van der Linden.

Rudi Carrell's bad result marked the start of a very poor Eurovision decade for the Netherlands, in which the country never placed higher than 10th again until Lenny Kuhr's shared victory in the 1969 contest.

=== Voting ===
Every participating broadcaster assembled a jury panel of ten people. Every jury member could give one point to his or her favourite song.

Points awarded to the Netherlands
Score	Country
1 point	Belgium; Italy

Points awarded by the Netherlands
Score	Country
5 points	United Kingdom
2 points	France
1 points	Italy; Norway; Sweden
