= Looking High, High, High =

1960 song by John R. Watson

Single by Bryan Johnson
- Released: 1960
- Songwriter: John Watson

Eurovision Song Contest 1960 entry
- Country: United Kingdom
- Artist: Bryan Johnson
- Language: English
- Composer: John Watson
- Lyricist: John Watson
- Conductor: Eric Robinson

Finals performance
- Final result: 2nd
- Final points: 25

Entry chronology
- ◄ "Sing, Little Birdie" (1959)
- "Are You Sure?" (1961) ►

"Looking High, High, High" is a song by British singer Bryan Johnson, which represented the United Kingdom at the Eurovision Song Contest 1960.

The song was performed first on the night of the contest, held on 29 March 1960, preceding Sweden's Siw Malmkvist with "Alla andra får varann". The song received 25 points, placing 2nd in a field of 13. That was Britain's equal highest Eurovision placing until the 1967 contest.

The song reached #20 on the UK Singles Chart and was succeeded as the UK representative at the 1961 contest by The Allisons with "Are You Sure?".

Preceded by "Sing, Little Birdie" by Pearl Carr and Teddy Johnson	United Kingdom in the Eurovision Song Contest; 1960	Succeeded by "Are You Sure?" by The Allisons
