= Ellen Winther =

Danish opera singer (1933–2011)

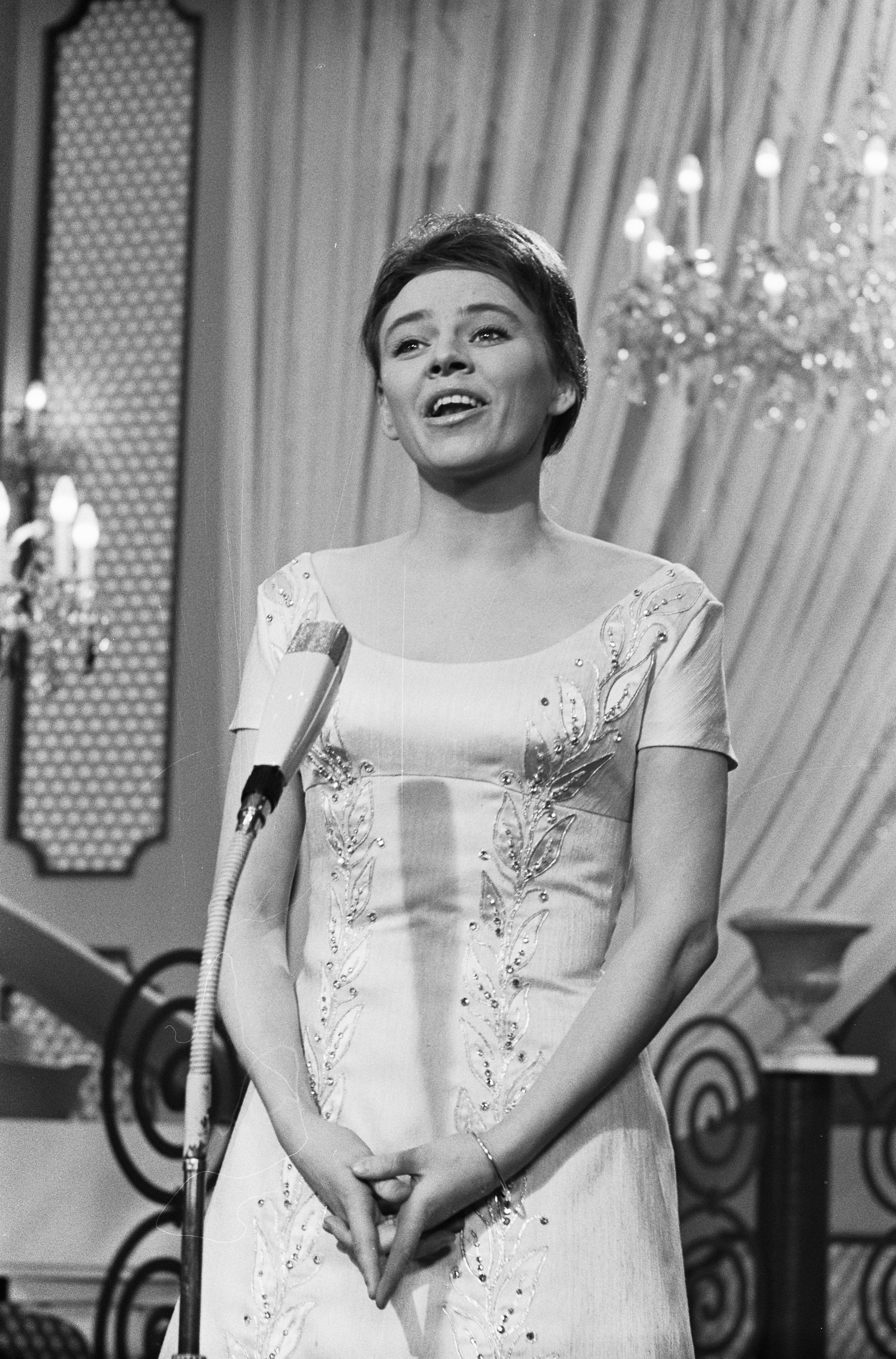
- Ellen Winther at the Eurovision Song Contest 1962

Background information
- Born: Ellen Sørensen; 11 August 1933; Århus, Denmark
- Died: 13 August 2011 (aged 78) Copenhagen, Denmark
- Genres: Opera, Musical theatre
- Occupation: Singer

Ellen Winther Lembourn (née Sørensen; 11 August 1933 – 13 August 2011) was a Danish opera singer, best known internationally for her participation in the 1962 Eurovision Song Contest.

Winther was born in Århus. She trained as an opera singer and made her professional debut in 1957 at the Royal Danish Theatre, where she would be employed for 30 years both as a singer and a dramatic actress. In the 1959 Disney animated classic Sleeping Beauty she voiced the Danish version of Aurora. In 1962, Winther won the Danish Eurovision Song Contest selection with the song "Vuggevise" ("Lullaby"), and went forward to the seventh Eurovision Song Contest, held in Luxembourg City on 18 March. "Vuggevise" finished in joint 10th place out of 16 entries.

Besides her success in operas, stage musicals and revues, Winther also became well known to Danish audiences by many appearances in film and television. This included her portrayal of Minna Varnæs in Matador in 1978. In 1983, she was awarded the Order of the Dannebrog for her contribution to the arts in Denmark..

== Marriages ==
Winther was married to pianist John Winther from 1960 to 1966, with two children from this marriage, and to writer and politician Hans Jørgen Lembourn from 1973 until his death in 1997.

== Death ==
Ellen Winther Lembourn died on 13 August 2011, two days after her 78th birthday.

Preceded by Dario Campeotto with Angelique	Denmark in the Eurovision Song Contest; 1962	Succeeded by Grethe & Jørgen Ingmann with Dansevise
