= Nerchau =

- Ortschaft of Grimma
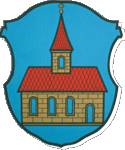
- Coat of arms
- Interactive map of Nerchau
- Location within Germany Location within Saxony
- Coordinates: 51°16′N 12°47′E
- Country: Germany
- State: Saxony
- District: Leipzig
- Town: Grimma

Area
  - Total: 39.94 km^{2} (15.42 sq mi)
- Elevation: 140 m (460 ft)

Population (2009-12-31)
  - Total: 3,899
  - Density: 97.62/km^{2} (252.8/sq mi)
- Time zone: UTC+01:00 (CET)
  - Summer (DST): UTC+02:00 (CEST)
- Postal codes: 04685, 04668
- Dialling codes: 034382
- Vehicle registration: L
- Website: www.nerchau.de

Nerchau is a town and a former municipality in the Leipzig district, in the Free State of Saxony, Germany. Since 1 January 2011, it is a part (Ortschaft) of the town Grimma. It is situated on the river Mulde, 7 km northeast of Grimma, and 30 km east of Leipzig (centre).

== Events ==
- Schützenfest (July/August)
- Mulde Regatta (August)
- Mulde Valley half marathon (April)

== History and economy ==
Nerchau is known for its paint factory which was established by the Hessel brothers in 1834. By 1880 it employed over 100 people. In 1945 the paint factory was nationalized by East Germany. After German Reunification the factory was sold a number of times and now belongs to Schoenfeld GmbH (Düsseldorf), which produces artists' paints Lukas since 1862. The town has suffered from depopulation in recent years. In January 2013 Daler-Rowney purchased Lukas and Nerchau, two German brands, with the intention of developing them further in their home country and far further afield. In February 2016, Daler-Rowney was acquired by the Milan-based F.I.L.A. Group, who also owns the U.S. Dixon Ticonderoga Company.

== Transport ==
The Autobahn A 14 runs nearby.

== Notable people ==
- The Kessler Twins (Alice and Ellen, 1936–2025), dancers, actresses and entertainers
