= Piove (Ciao, ciao bambina) =

1959 song by both Domenico Modugno and Johnny Dorelli

Single by Domenico Modugno
- Language: Italian
- Released: 1959
- Label: Fonit
- Composer: Domenico Modugno
- Lyricist: Dino Verde

Eurovision Song Contest 1959 entry
- Country: Italy
- Artist: Domenico Modugno
- Language: Italian
- Composer: Domenico Modugno
- Lyricist: Dino Verde
- Conductor: William Galassini

Finals performance
- Final result: 6th
- Final points: 9

Entry chronology
- ◄ "Nel blu, dipinto di blu" (1958)
- "Romantica" (1960) ►

"Piove"

Single by Johnny Dorelli
- Language: Italian
- Released: 1959
- Label: CGD
- Composer: Domenico Modugno
- Lyricist: Dino Verde

"Piove (Ciao, ciao bambina)" ("It's raining [Bye bye, baby girl]") is a song composed by Domenico Modugno with Italian lyrics by Eduardo Verde. It won first prize at the 1959 Sanremo Music Festival, where it was performed by both Modugno and Johnny Dorelli. Performed by Modugno, it represented Italy in the Eurovision Song Contest 1959 held in Cannes, placing sixth.

Dalida recorded a song in French as "Ciao ciao bambina", which became a big hit in France and Canada and a pop standard in the francophone world. It was used in Ralph Lauren commercial for their fall 2021 collection.

== Background ==
=== Conception ===
"Piove" was composed by Domenico Modugno with Italian lyrics by Eduardo Verde. It is a dramatic ballad, with the singer telling his lover that he knows their relationship is about to come to a close. He asks her for one more kiss and then tells her not to turn back as she walks away from him, because he still has feelings for her.

=== Sanremo ===
On 29–31 January 1959, "Piove" performed by both Modugno and Johnny Dorelli competed in the 9th edition of the Sanremo Music Festival and won the competition. As the festival was used by Radiotelevisione italiana (RAI) to select its song and performer for the 4th edition of the Eurovision Song Contest, the song became the Italian entrant for the contest, with Modugno chosen as the performer for the second year in a row.

Modugno recorded the song then in Italian as "Piove (Ciao, ciao bambina)", German, Spanish, and in an Italian/English version.

=== Eurovision ===
On 11 March 1959, the Eurovision Song Contest was held at the Palais des Festivals et des Congrès in Cannes hosted by Radiodiffusion-Télévision Française (RTF) and broadcast live throughout the continent. Modugno performed "Piove (Ciao, ciao bambina)" third on the evening, following Denmark's "Uh, jeg ville ønske jeg var dig" by Birthe Wilke and preceding Monaco's "Mon ami Pierrot" by Jacques Pills. William Galassini conducted the event's live orchestra in the performance of the Italian entry.

At the close of voting, the song had received 9 points, placing sixth in a field of eleven. It was succeeded as Italian representative at the 1960 contest by "Romantica" by Renato Rascel.

== Charts ==
=== Weekly charts ===
Modugno's version

Chart (1959)	Peak position
Belgium (Ultratop 50 Flanders)	1
Belgium (Ultratop 50 Wallonia)	1
Italy (Musica e dischi)	1
Netherlands (Dutch Top 100)	1
UK Singles (Official Charts)	29
US Billboard Hot 100	97
West Germany (GfK)	12

== Other versions ==
=== Dalida cover ===
"Ciao ciao bambina"
- Cover of EP

Song by Dalida

from the album Le disque d'or de Dalida
- Language: French
- Released: April 1959
- Recorded: 25 February 1959
- Studio: Hoche
- Genre: Chanson; traditional pop
- Length: 2:53
- Label: Barclay
- Composer: Domenico Modugno
- Lyricists: Dino Verde; Jacques Larue

Dalida covered "Ciao ciao bambina" in Italian and was the first one to record a French version. The Italian version remained unreleased until a posthoumus album Italia mia in 1991. The French version was first issued on EP in 1959 and was the leading track of her album Le disque d'or de Dalida the same year.

==== Weekly charts ====
Chart (1959)	Peak position
Belgium (Ultratop 50 Wallonia)	1
Canada (BAnQ)	5
France (Bourse des chansons)	2

=== Other recordings ===
- In 1959 the song entered the Hong Kong Hit Parade after being recorded by a local group – The Yee Tin Tong Mandolin Band – and released by Diamond Records (B-side: "Oh Marie").
- Also in 1959, French bandleader Jacky Noguez, along with his Musuette Orchestra, recorded an instrumental version which peaked at #24 on the US Hot 100.
- In 1961, this song was covered by Hong Kong female singer Kong Ling (江玲) on her LP album Off-Beat Cha Cha with the local Diamond Records.
- Italo-American tenor Sergio Franchi recorded this song on his 1966 RCA Victor album La Dolce Italy.
- In 2015, Italian operatic pop trio Il Volo recorded a rendition of this song on their EP Sanremo Grande Amore.

== See also ==
- List of best-selling singles by country
