= Richard Levin (designer) =

Richard Levin OBE (31 December 1910 - 2 July 2000) was the former head of design at BBC Television from 1953 to 1971, and gave the BBC its modern look in the late 1960s, when colour television was innovatively introduced. As a stage designer, he had been drafted in as head of camouflage for the Air Ministry during the Battle of Britain.

== Early life ==
He was born in north London.

== Career ==
=== British films ===
He joined Gaumont-British in 1928 as a stage designer, where he worked until 1932.

=== World War II ===
From the start of World War 2 he was the head of camouflage for the Air Ministry from 1939–42, to conceal RAF stations. He worked at the Ministry of Information as Exhibition Division designer of the Army's national exhibition that toured the UK to Manchester Cardiff and Glasgow. Former stage designer and art director on films.

After the war, he had designed exhibitions for the BBC. He had designed all BBC exhibitions from 1933.

=== BBC ===
He took over at the BBC as Head of TV Design from Peter Bax on Monday 9 March 1953, when aged 42. Peter Bax had died suddenly aged 57, on Tuesday 28 October 1952, after a three-weeks illness.

He designed the set of the Eurovision Song Contest 1960, held on 29 March 1960 in London.

From 1967 he was the head of the BBC Television Design Group, when the BBC changed to colour. By March 1968, over 90% of programmes were in colour.

He retired from the BBC in 1971. In 1971, he became one of the Royal Designers for Industry. He became a photographer in the 1970s.

== Publications ==
In 1961 he wrote the book Television By Design.

== Personal life ==
He was awarded the OBE in the 1952 New Year Honours.

He married Evelyn Alexander in 1932 in London; they had two daughters in 1932 and 1935. He later married Patricia Foy, a producer, in March 1960 in London, becoming engaged in January 1960. Patricia Foy (born 25 November 1922) had joined the BBC in the late 1950s; she died in Wiltshire on 26 July 2006.

== See also ==
- List of camoufleurs
- Abram Games, who designed the first BBC logo in November 1953
