= Paul Klinger Künstlersozialwerk =

German nonprofit social organisation

Paul Klinger Künstlersozialwerk is an independent German non-profit social registered association (e.V.) founded in 1974 and based in Munich. It is not associated with any public institution, and is financed exclusively by membership fees and donations. It helps artists in emergency situations, as well as with a helpline for all questions related to an artist's life, such as insurance, pension plans, legal matters, debts, and bankruptcy, and other social issues. The association has about 1.200 members of all crafts and disciplines, e.g. musicians and composers, painters and further fine artists, novelists and poets, TV and film-makers, actors, dancers and other stage performers, photographers, journalists, publicists, and illustrators.

== History ==
The Paul Klinger Künstlersozialwerk was founded to honour the German actor and social activist Paul Klinger three years after his death in 1971, who during his life stood for bettering the conditions of disadvantaged artists in post-World War II Germany.

== Notable members ==
Among the 1200 members are many well-known artists, e.g. the entertainers Kessler Twins, the singer and actress Bibi Johns, the musician Peter Horton (died in 2023), the singer Stephan Remmler of the band Trio, the satirist and stand-up comedian Claus von Wagner, the singer-songwriter Konstantin Wecker.

== Honours ==
For their social engagement, the Paul Klinger Künstlersozialwerk was awarded the Medal of Honour of the Münchener Künstlergenossenschaft königlich privilegiert 1868 [Munich Royal artist society privileged in 1868], founded under Ludwig II of Bavaria) in 2020.
