= Belgium in the Eurovision Song Contest 1960 =

- Eurovision Song Contest 1960
- Participating broadcaster: Institut national de radiodiffusion (INR) (Note: Institut national de radiodiffusion (INR) was the official French-language name of the National Broadcasting Institute (NIR/INR).)
- Country: Belgium
- Selection process: Finale Belge pour le Grand Prix Eurovision de la Chanson Européenne
- Selection date: 24 January 1960

Competing entry
- Song: "Mon amour pour toi"
- Artist: Fud Leclerc
- Songwriters: Jack Say; Robert Montal

Placement
- Final result: 6th, 9 points

Participation chronology

Belgium was represented at the Eurovision Song Contest 1960 with the song "Mon amour pour toi", composed by Jack Say, with lyrics by Robert Montal, and performed by Fud Leclerc. The French-speaking department of the Belgian participating broadcaster, the National Broadcasting Institute (NIR/INR), selected its entry through a national final. This was the third of Leclerc's four appearances for Belgium at Eurovision.

== Before Eurovision ==
=== Finale Belge pour le Grand Prix Eurovision de la Chanson Européenne ===
The National Broadcasting Institute (NIR/INR), whose official name in French was Institut national de radiodiffusion (INR), delegated its participation in the Eurovision Song Contest 1960 to its French-speaking department, which developed the national final format Finale Belge pour le Grand Prix Eurovision 1960 de la Chanson Européenne in order to select its entry for the contest. The national final was held during the first part of the show D'une scène à l'autre.

==== Competing Entries ====
INR received 187 submissions, from which ten songs were selected over three days by a 10-member jury. The jury then chose five songs to participate in the televised selection and simultaneously determined the results of the selection.

==== Final ====
Five entries competed in the competition which was held on 24 January 1960 at the INR studios in Brussels, and was hosted by Georges Désir and Arlette Vincent. The winner was chosen by an "expert" jury. Among the other participants was Solange Berry, who had represented Luxembourg in 1958.

Final - 24 January 1960
| R/O | Artist | Song | Songwriter(s) | | Place |
| R/O | Artist | Song | Composer(s) | Lyricist(s) | Place |
|---|---|---|---|---|---|
| 1 | Solange Berry | "À plein cœur" | Channe; Mortier | | —N/a |
| 2 | Fud Leclerc | "Il y a bien longtemps" | Teddy Burns; Claude Alix | | —N/a |
| 3 | Fud Leclerc | "Mon amour pour toi" | Jack Say | Robert Montal | 1 |
| 4 | Mary Thé | "On m'attend" | Edgard Kermont | Runbel | —N/a |
| 5 | Lily Vincent | "Vieux carnet" | Jean-Michel Thierry; Sylvie Dupont | | —N/a |

== At Eurovision ==
"Mon amour pour toi" was conducted by Henri Segers and performed 5th in the running order, following Denmark and preceding Norway. At the close of the voting it had received 9 points, placing Belgium 6th of the 13 entries. The Belgian jury awarded its highest mark (3) to contest winners France. It was succeeded as Belgian representative at the 1961 contest by Bob Benny performing "September, gouden roos".

=== Voting ===
Every participating broadcaster assembled a jury panel of ten people. Every jury member could give one point to his or her favourite song.

Points awarded to Belgium
| Score | Country |
|---|---|
| 4 points | Sweden |
| 3 points | Italy |
| 1 point | Austria; Germany |

Points awarded by Belgium
| Score | Country |
|---|---|
| 3 points | France |
| 2 points | Germany |
| 1 point | Austria; Italy; Netherlands; Norway; United Kingdom |
