= Wyn Hoop =

- Born: Winfried Lüssenhop; 29 May 1936 (age 89)
- Origin: Hannover, Germany
- Genres: Pop
- Occupation: Singer
- Website: horn-hoop-maritim.de

Wyn Hoop (born 29 May 1936) is a German singer, birth name Winfried Lüssenhop, best known for his participation in the 1960 Eurovision Song Contest.

Born in Hannover, in the early 1950s, Hoop formed a jazz band called the Capitellos, who toured and worked on radio before disbanding in 1958. Hoop started to make solo recordings, at first under the name Fred Lyssen, before settling on the professional name Wyn Hoop.

In 1960, Hoop took part in the German Eurovision selection final, and his song "Bonne nuit ma chérie" was chosen to go forward to the fifth Eurovision Song Contest, held in London on 29 March. At the contest "Bonne nuit ma chérie" (which, despite its title, was sung in German) finished in joint fourth place of the 13 entries.

Hoop recorded several successful German cover versions of English-language hits (such as "Are You Lonesome Tonight?") before joining forces in 1962 with Finnish singer Pirkko Mannola, with whom he recorded a number of popular tracks. From 1964, Hoop began recording with Austrian singer Andrea Horn, who he had married in 1961. Their material was mainly folk music oriented. In 1973, they released the single "Was kann schöner sein", written by Lynsey de Paul (credited as Rubin) and Ron Roker as Wyn & Andrea.

In 1978, Hoop and Horn retired from show business. They have since established themselves as successful publishers of sailing guidebooks, and contributors of travelogues to magazines and newspapers.

Preceded by Alice and Ellen Kessler with Heute Abend wollen wir tanzen geh'n	Germany in the Eurovision Song Contest; 1960	Succeeded by Lale Andersen with Einmal sehen wir uns wieder
