= Kessler Twins =

German singers, dancers and actresses (1936–2025)

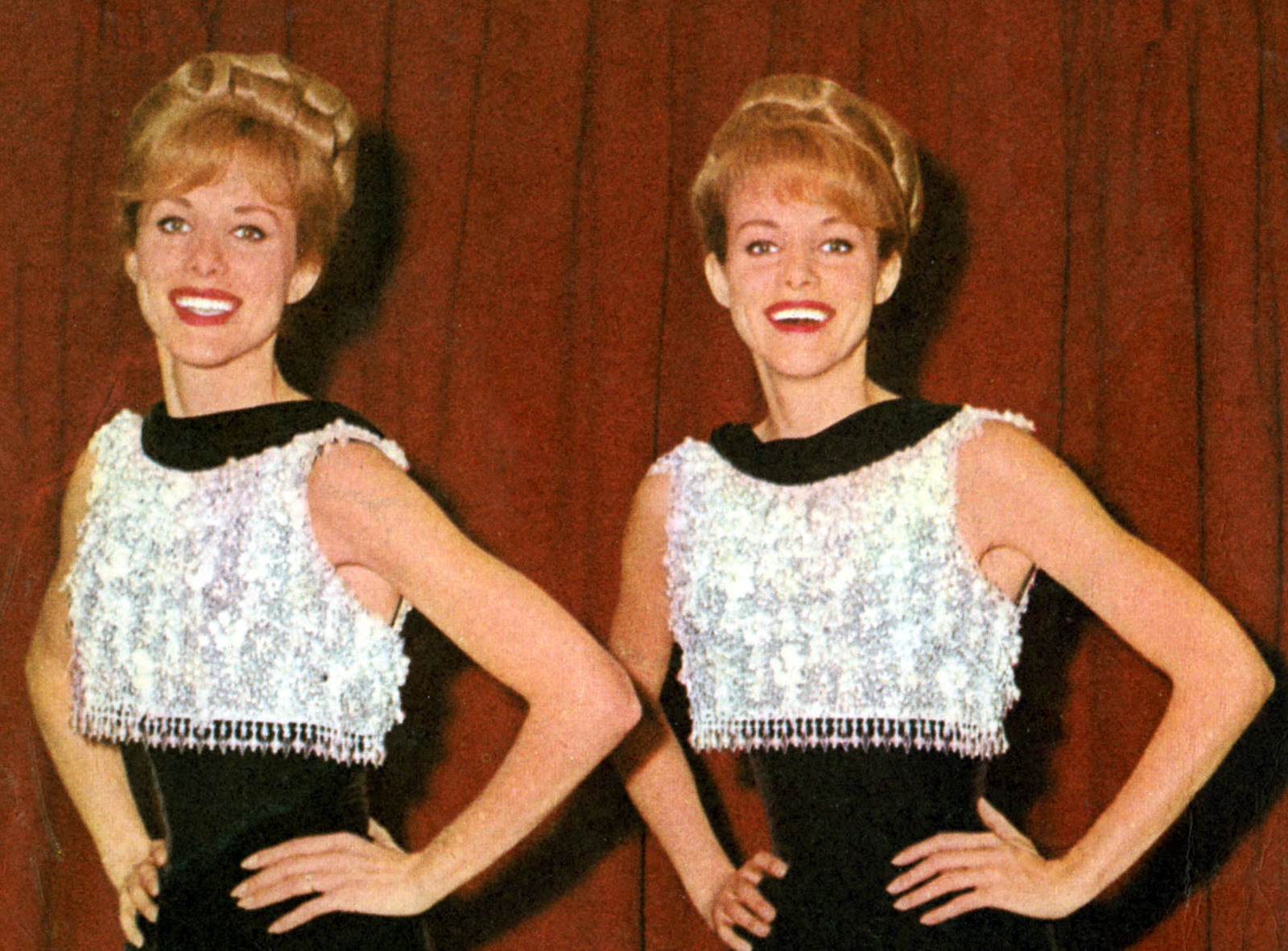
- The Kessler Twins in 1965
- Born: Alice Kaessler; Ellen Kaessler; 20 August 1936; Nerchau, Gau Saxony, Nazi Germany
- Died: 17 November 2025 (aged 89); Grünwald, Bavaria, Germany
- Other names: die Kessler-Zwillinge (in Germany) le gemelle Kessler (in Italy)
- Occupations: Singers; dancers; actresses
- Years active: 1947–2016

Alice and Ellen Kessler (born Kaessler, German: [aˈliːsə/ˈɛlən ˈkɛslɐ]; 20 August 1936 – 17 November 2025), usually credited as the Kessler Twins (German: die Kessler-Zwillinge; Italian: le gemelle Kessler), were twin German singers, dancers, and actresses, who were popular in Europe, especially Germany and Italy, during the 1950s and 1960s.

== Early life ==
Twin sisters Alice and Ellen Kessler were born on 20 August 1936 in Nerchau, Saxony, to parents Paul and Elsa Kaessler (also spelled Kässler). The girls started ballet classes at the age of six, and they joined the Leipzig Opera's child ballet program at age 11. In 1952, when the twins were 16, their parents used a visitor's visa for the family to leave East Germany.

== Career ==
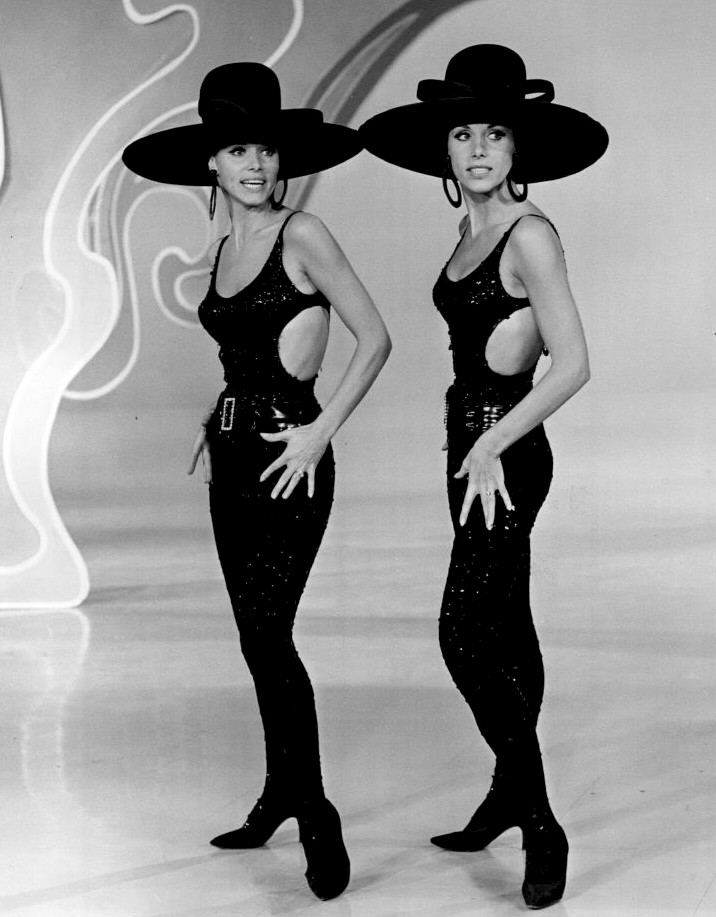
The Kessler Twins on The Danny Kaye Show in 1966

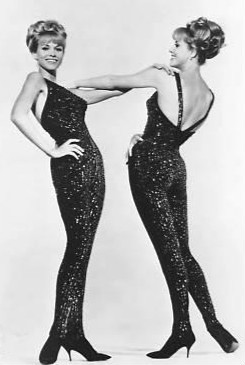
Kessler Twins in 1966

After they reached Düsseldorf, the sisters performed at the Palladium theatre. Between 1955 and 1960, they performed at The Lido in Paris. There they met American singer Elvis Presley, who was on leave from the army on 17 June 1959. The twins represented West Germany in the Eurovision Song Contest 1959, finishing in 8th place with "Heute Abend wollen wir tanzen geh'n" ("Tonight we want to go dancing"). While performing at The Lido, they also met Don Lurio, a US-born Italian choreographer who brought them to Italy in 1961.

In 1962, the twins moved to Italy, changing their surname from Kaessler to Kessler. They gradually worked into more serious roles and became very popular through the RAI television variety show Studio Uno (1961–1966), with the opening theme "Da-da-un-pa" becoming their most memorable song in Italy. At the age of 40, they agreed to pose for the cover of an issue of the Italian edition of Playboy, which became the fastest-selling Italian Playboy to that date.

The Kessler sisters were also significantly popular in the United States, making their American television debut on variety show The Red Skelton Hour and appearing on national television programs including The Danny Kaye Show and The Ed Sullivan Show. They also appeared in the 1962 film Sodom and Gomorrah as dancers, and were depicted on the cover of Life that same year.

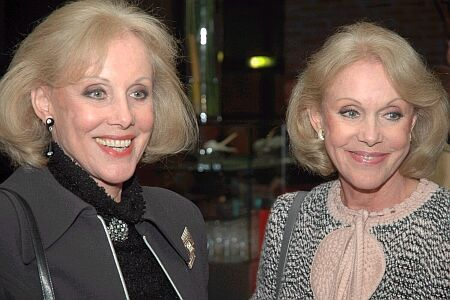
The Kessler Twins in 2005

The Kessler Twins moved back to Germany in 1986 and lived in Grünwald, near Munich, Bavaria. They received awards from both the German and Italian governments for promoting German–Italian cooperation through their work in show business.

== Personal lives and deaths ==
Despite both sisters having a history of romances – with Ellen being with the Italian actor Umberto Orsini for 20 years, and Alice having relationships with the French singer Marcel Amont and Italian actor Enrico Maria Salerno – neither of the two sisters ever married.

The twins died together, by assisted suicide in Grünwald, on 17 November 2025, at the age of 89. The suicide took place in the presence of a doctor and a lawyer from the German Society for Humane Dying. It was known that the twins did not want to become dependent on nursing care, and wanted to die together. According to a friend, Ellen had suffered a stroke in October, and their general quality of life was declining due to heart problems and loss of the sense of smell. In a 2023 interview with Bild, the sisters revealed that they had changed their last will and testament. They had initially wanted to bequeath their entire estate to Doctors Without Borders, but changed it so that more social organisations would inherit something; these organisations included the Paul Klinger Künstlersozialwerk, Christoffel-Blindenmission, UNICEF, and Deutsche Stiftung Patientenschutz.

== Selected filmography ==
Sources:

- As Long as There Are Pretty Girls (1955)
- The Beggar Student (1956)
- The Count of Luxembourg (1957)
- The Twins from Zillertal (1957)
- My Sweetheart Is from Tyrol (1958)
- Gräfin Mariza (1958)
- Les Magiciennes (1960)
- Love and the Frenchwoman (1960)
- Erik the Conqueror (1961)
- The Bird Seller (1962)
- Sodom and Gomorrah (1962)
- Wedding Night in Paradise (1962)
- The Thursday (1963)
- Dead Woman from Beverly Hills (1964)

== Awards ==
- Premio Capo Circe
- 1987: Order of Merit of the Federal Republic of Germany
- 2006: Honorary citizens of Grimma
- 2025: Bavarian Order of Merit

== Bibliography ==
- Kessler, Alice; Kessler, Ellen (1996). Eins und eins ist eins (in German). Ed. Ferenczy bei Bruckmann. ISBN 978-3-7654-2880-7. OCLC 38132100.

Preceded by Margot Hielscher with "Für zwei Groschen Musik"	Germany in the Eurovision Song Contest; 1959	Succeeded by Wyn Hoop with "Bonne nuit ma chérie"
