= Sweden in the Eurovision Song Contest 1960 =

- Eurovision Song Contest 1960
- Participating broadcaster: Sveriges Radio (SR)
- Country: Sweden
- Selection process: Song: National final Artist: Internal selection
- Selection date: 2 February 1960

Competing entry
- Song: "Alla andra får varann"
- Artist: Siw Malmkvist
- Songwriters: Ulf Kjellqvist; Åke Gerhard

Placement
- Final result: 10th, 4 points

Participation chronology

Sweden was represented at the Eurovision Song Contest 1960 with the song "Alla andra får varann", composed by Ulf Kjellqvist, with lyrics by Åke Gerhard, and performed by Siw Malmkvist. The Swedish participating broadcaster, Sveriges Radio (SR), selected its entry through a national final. The song was performed once by Östen Warnerbring and once by Ingrid Berggren at the national final, however SR decided that Malmkvist would represent Sweden, as she had been denied that the previous year.

== Before Eurovision ==
=== National final ===
The national final (retroactively often referred to as Melodifestivalen 1960) was the selection for the third song to represent Sweden at the Eurovision Song Contest. It was the second time that Sveriges Radio (SR) used this system of picking a song.

In contrast to the previous year, where only members of the Swedish songwriters association SKAP could take part, the submission was open for everyone. Before the submission deadline on 25 September 1959, approximately 1100 songs were submitted to SR for the competition. From October 1959, eight radio preselection rounds with two songs each were held in the program Säg det med musik, with a jury consisting of Roland Eiworth, Ulf Peder Olrog and Willard Ringstrand which determined which eight songs would reach the televised semi-final. In the semi-final, held on 28 December 1959, and broadcast on television and Sveriges Radio P1, the eight songs were reduced to four by a different jury consisting of seven members.

==== Final ====
The final was held on 2 February 1960 at Cirkus, Stockholm and was broadcast under the title Eurovisionsschlagern - svensk final on Sveriges Radio TV, Sveriges Radio P1, as well as on Norwegian and Danish television via the Nordvision network. Arne Arnbom served as producer, the presenter was Jeanette von Heidenstam.

At the final two artists sang the same song, one accompanied by the Swedish Radio Symphony Orchestra under the musical direction of Thore Erling, and the other artist with a smaller ensemble led by Göte Wilhelmson.

As interval acts, Kari Sylwan performed a ballet dance to the music of "Over the rainbow", and the Swedish Radio Symphony Orchestra played a medley of songs from previous Eurovision Song Contests, including "Nel blu dipinto di blu", "Dors mon amour", "Uh, jeg ville ønske, jeg var dig", and "Piove".

Four "expert" juries sitting in four different locations (Luleå, Gothenburg, Malmö, Stockholm) decided the winning song. The songwriters of the competing entries were only revealed after the announcement of the winning song. Östen Warnerbring performed a short reprise of the winning song "Alla andra får varann". The previous year's winner Siw Malmkvist was selected to sing the entry at the Eurovision Song Contest in the aftermath of the final.

Eurovisionsschlagern - svensk final
R/O	Artist 1	Artist 2	Song	Songwriters	Points	Place
1	Britt Damberg^{1}	Mona Grain^{2}	"Nancy, Nancy"	Sune Borg, Åke Gerhard	56	4
2	Inger Berggren^{2}	Östen Warnerbring^{1}	"Alla andra får varann"	Ulf Källqvist, Åke Gerhard	85	1
3	Mona Grain^{1}	Britt Damberg^{2}	"Alexander"	Åke Gerhard	67	3
4	Östen Warnerbring^{2}	Inger Berggren^{1}	"Underbar, så underbar"	Per Lindqvist	76	2

- ^{1} Performer with large orchestra
- ^{2} Performer with smaller ensemble

Detailed regional jury voting results
Song	Stockholm	Gothenburg	Malmö	Luleå	Total
"Nancy, Nancy"	10	12	21	13	56
"Alla andra får varann"	16	20	19	30	85
"Alexander"	14	11	24	18	67
"Underbar, så underbar"	18	10	25	23	76

Semifinalists
Artist	Song	Songwriters
Tommy Jacobsson	"Vårens första flicka"	Gunnar Hoffsten, Åke Gerhard
Bertil Englund	"Flicka med positiv"	Bobbie Ericson, Eric Sandström
Lill-Babs	"En kyss"	Albert Stenbock, Fritz-Gustaf Sundelöf
Lars Lönndahl	"Res med mig"	Bobbie Ericson, Eric Sandström

== At Eurovision ==
On the night of the final Siw Malmkvist performed 2nd in the running order, following United Kingdom and preceding Luxembourg. At the close of voting "Alla andra får varann" had received 4 points, placing Sweden joint 10th (with Denmark) of the 13 entries. The Swedish jury awarded its highest mark (4) to Belgium and to contest winners France.

=== Voting ===
Every participating broadcaster assembled a jury panel of ten people. Every jury member could give one point to his or her favourite song.

Points awarded to Sweden
Score	Country
2 points	France
1 point	Italy; Netherlands

Points awarded by Sweden
Score	Country
4 points	Belgium; France
1 point	Germany; United Kingdom
