= Germany in the Eurovision Song Contest 1960 =

- Eurovision Song Contest 1960
- Participating broadcaster: ARD (Note: Arbeitsgemeinschaft der öffentlich-rechtlichen Rundfunkanstalten der Bundesrepublik Deutschland) – Hessischer Rundfunk (HR)
- Country: Germany
- Selection process: National final
- Selection date: 6 February 1960

Competing entry
- Song: "Bonne nuit ma chérie"
- Artist: Wyn Hoop
- Songwriters: Franz Josef Breuer; Kurt Schwabach

Placement
- Final result: 4th, 11 points

Participation chronology

Germany was represented at the Eurovision Song Contest 1960 with the song "Bonne nuit ma chérie", composed by Franz Josef Breuer, with lyrics by Kurt Schwabach, and performed by Wyn Hoop. The German participating broadcaster on behalf of ARD, Hessischer Rundfunk (HR), selected its entry through a national final. The song was sung in German despite its French title.

Heidi Brühl finished runner-up in the national final; however her song "Wir wollen niemals auseinandergehn" topped the German singles chart for several weeks and was one of the year's biggest sellers.

== Before Eurovision ==
=== National final ===
The national final was held on 6 February at the Rhein-Main-Halle in Wiesbaden, hosted by Hilde Nocker and Werner Fullerer. Ten songs took part, with the winner being decided by a 45-member jury made up of 15 "experts" and 30 members of the public. Whether the opinion of the "experts" carried more weight pro-rata is not known. Only the top three placements are known.

Final - 6 February 1960
R/O	Artist	Song	Place
1	Angèle Durand & Rex Gildo	"Abitur der Liebe"	—N/a
2	Gerhard Wendland	"Alle Wunder dieser Welt"	3
3	Gitta Lind	"Auf der Straße der Träume"	—N/a
4	Wyn Hoop	"Bonne nuit ma chérie"	1
5	Gerd Ströhl	"Das Herz einer Frau"	—N/a
6	Rainer Bertram	"Ein Picasso in der Liebe"	—N/a
7	Ingrid Werner	"Ich hab' ein Hobby"	—N/a
8	The Charming Boys	"Oh Little Joe"	—N/a
9	Tony Sandler	"Oh, wie schön"	—N/a
10	Heidi Brühl	"Wir wollen niemals auseinandergehn"	2

== At Eurovision ==
On the night of the final Wyn Hoop performed 11th in the running order, following the Netherlands and preceding Italy. There were no specific rules in place as yet in 1960 regarding song length, although European Broadcasting Union guidelines suggested that ideally songs should be no more than 3 minutes 30 seconds in duration. Germany was only one of several countries who appeared to have disregarded the advice, as "Bonne nuit ma chérie" clocked in at 4 minutes 10 seconds. At the close of voting "Bonne nuit ma chérie" had received 11 points, placing Germany joint 4th (with Norway) of the 13 entries. The German jury awarded 7 of its 10 points to Monaco.

=== Voting ===
Every participating broadcaster assembled a jury panel of ten people. Every jury member could give one point to his or her favourite song.

Points awarded to Germany
Score	Country
4 points	France
2 points	Austria; Belgium; Monaco
1 point	Sweden

Points awarded by Germany
Score	Country
7 points	Monaco
1 point	Belgium; France; United Kingdom
