= Bjarne Hoyer =

Danish composer (1912–1991)

Bjarne Hoyer (April 24, 1912, Hellerup, Copenhagen - March 30, 1991) was a Danish composer.

Bjarne Hoyer was educated at Niels Brock College in 1935, after which he began to compose popular dance music. He and Knud Pheiffer got the idea for a radio cabaret, Vi unge (literally we young), which he participated in between 1938 and 1943. His success continued, as he brought out such songs as Bare for at få et glimt af dig (Just to Get a Glimpse of You), Det er kærlighed (It is love), Regnvejrsserenade (Rainy Day Serenade), Solskinsserenade (Sunset Serenade), Når bladene falder (When the Leaves Fall), Min melodi til dig (My Song to You) og Kom hjem lille far (Come Home Little Father).

In 1960, he participated in that year's Dansk Melodi Grand Prix and came in seventh place with his composition, To lys på et bord (Two Candles on a Table). He went on to record a classic Christmas song, Skal vi klippe vore julehjerter sammen (Shall We Cut Our Pleated Christmas hearts Together?) and worked for a time at the then new offshore radio station, Radio Mercur. In 1978, he married Birgit Hjorthus in Ordnup Church.

The 1960 song "Hip Hurra for Danmarks El've" was written and composed by Hoyer and Wilhelm Grant. It is a tribute song to the 1960 Danish Olympic football team, which won silver that year.

== See also ==
- List of Danish composers
