= Tony Dallara =

Italian singer (1936–2026)

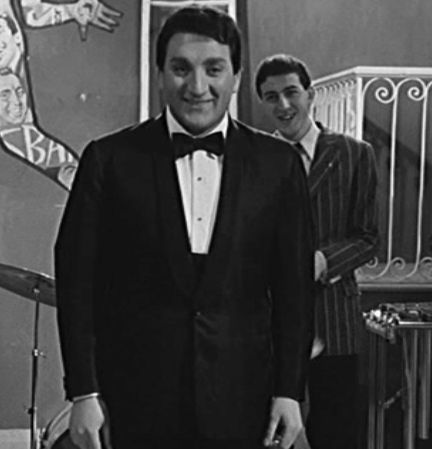
- Dallara in Canzonissima (1961)
- Born: Antonio Lardera; 30 June 1936; Campobasso, Italy
- Died: 16 January 2026 (aged 89); Milan, Italy
- Occupations: Singer; actor

Antonio Lardera (30 June 1936 – 16 January 2026), better known by his stage name Tony Dallara, was an Italian singer and actor.

== Life and career ==
The son of a La Scala chorus member, Dallara was born in Campobasso in southern Italy, but grew up in Milan. After working as barman and clerk, he began his musical career in the band Rocky Mountains (the future group I Campioni); his singing style was inspired, in particular, by American singers such as Frankie Laine and Tony Williams.

In 1957, he signed a contract as singer with the Italian label Music, where he was working as delivery man. His first single "Come prima", although refused for admission to the Sanremo Festival, was published in December 1957 and sold 300,000 copies, becoming the biggest selling single in Italy up to that point.

In 1960, Dallara won the Sanremo Music Festival and the Canzonissima competition with the song "Romantica"; the following year, he won again at Canzonissima with the song "Bambina bambina" and placed tenth at the Sanremo Festival with "Un uomo vivo". In 1964, he returned at the Sanremo Festival, reaching the finals with "Come potrei dimenticarti", performed in a double performance with Ben E. King. His hits also include the songs "Ti dirò", "Ghiaccio bollente", "Non partir", and "Cinzia". He also appeared in several musicarelli films.

Dallara died in Milan on 16 January 2026, at the age of 89.
