= Bryan Johnson (singer) =

English singer and actor (1926–1995)

- Born: Brian Cecil Johnson; 18 July 1926; London, England
- Died: 18 October 1995 (aged 69)
- Occupations: Singer, actor
- Instrument: Vocals
- Years active: 1951–1968

Bryan Cecil Johnson (born Brian Cecil Johnson; 18 July 1926 – 18 October 1995) was an English singer and actor.

== Biography ==
Having been eliminated in the semi-finals of the 1957 UK heats for Eurovision, he later emulated his brother and sister-in-law, Pearl Carr and Teddy Johnson, by coming second in the Eurovision Song Contest in 1960, with "Looking High, High, High". The single reached number 20 in the UK Singles Chart in April 1960. Johnson also participated in A Song for Europe, the UK qualifying heat for Eurovision in 1961. His song, "A Place in the Country" came fifth.

He was also an actor who, in Donald Wolfit's company, played such roles as Feste in Twelfth Night and the Fool in King Lear. In Ronald Harwood's biography of Wolfit, the actor is quoted as saying (p. 251) that he was "the best Fool I ever had". Later he played roles in musicals such as Lock Up Your Daughters, and enjoyed a late success as Scrooge in a touring production of A Christmas Carol. He was an actor of the old school with a melodious speaking voice and a strong stage presence.

Johnson recounted his Eurovision experiences in an edition of Gloria Live, with Gloria Hunniford, broadcast on BBC One on 4 May 1990.

Preceded by Pearl Carr and Teddy Johnson with "Sing, Little Birdie"	United Kingdom in the Eurovision Song Contest; 1960	Succeeded by The Allisons with "Are You Sure?"
