= Sanremo Music Festival 1960 =

Italian song contest (10th edition)

Dates and venue
- Semi-final 1: 28 January 1960
- Semi-final 2: 29 January 1960
- Final: 30 January 1960
- Venue: Sanremo Casino; Sanremo, Italy

Organisation
- Broadcaster: Radiotelevisione italiana (RAI)
- Artistic director: Ezio Radaelli
- Presenters: Paolo Ferrari and Enza Sampò

Vote
- Number of entries: 20
- Winner: "Romantica"; Tony Dallara and Renato Rascel

The Sanremo Music Festival 1960 (Italian: Festival di Sanremo 1960), officially the 10th Italian Song Festival (10º Festival della canzone italiana), was the tenth annual Sanremo Music Festival, held at the Sanremo Casino in Sanremo between 28 and 30 January 1960, and broadcast by Radiotelevisione italiana (RAI). The show was presented by Paolo Ferrari and Enza Sampò. Ezio Radaelli served as artistic director.

According to the rules of this edition every song was performed in a double performance by a couple of singers or groups. The winners of the festival were Tony Dallara and Renato Rascel with the song "Romantica". Rascel went on to perform the song for Italy at the Eurovision Song Contest 1960 and finished in joint 8th place.

== Participants and results ==
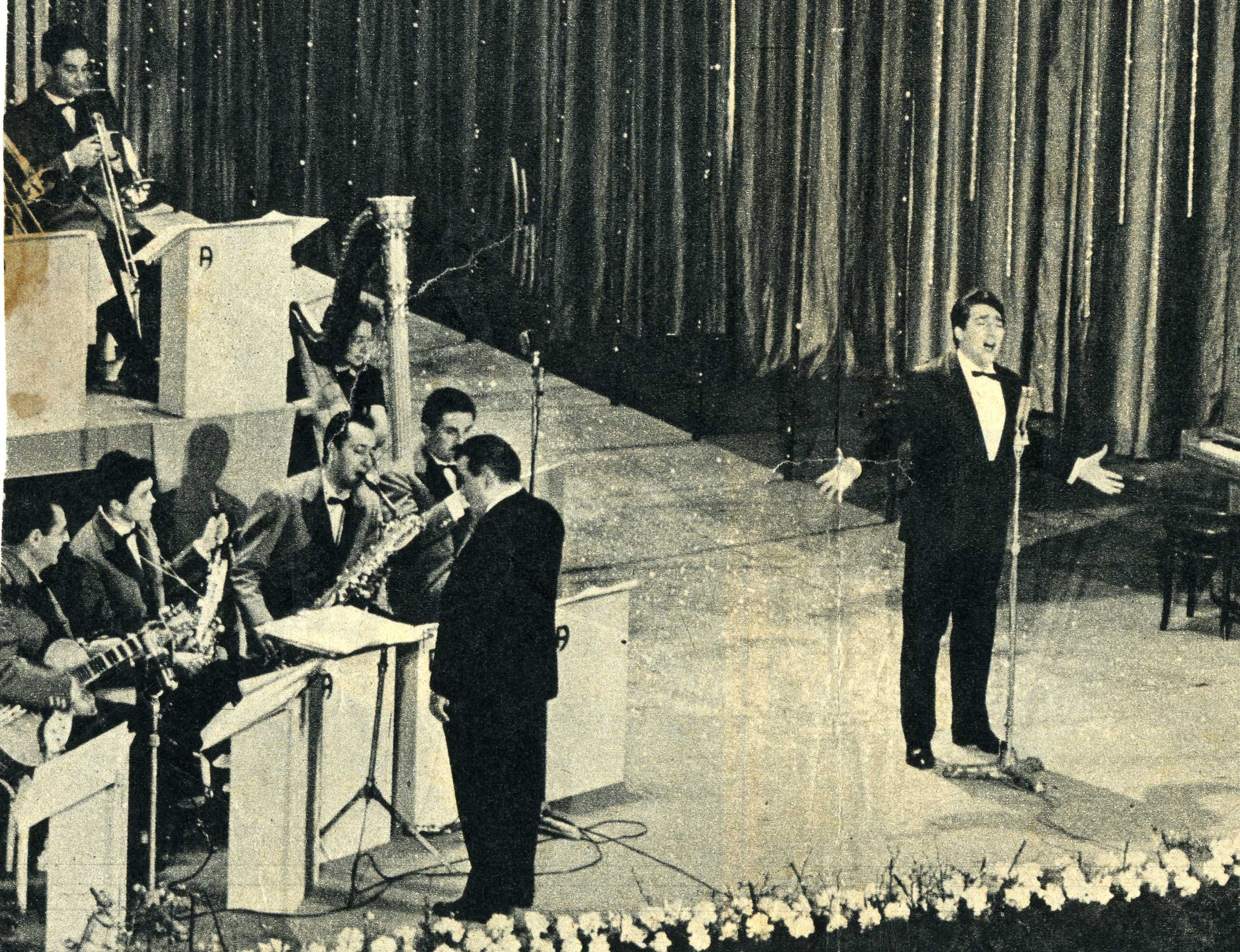
Tony Dallara performing the winning entry "Romantica"

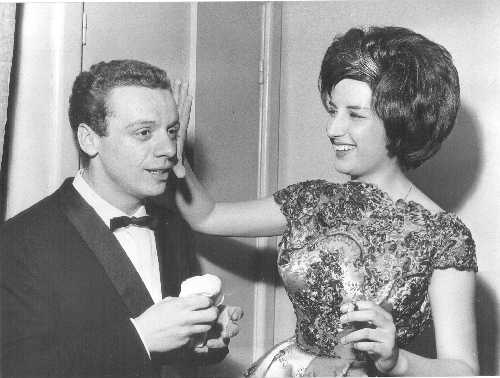
Mina and Johnny Dorelli behind the scenes

Participants and results
| Song | Artist(s) | | Songwriter(s) | Rank |
|---|---|---|---|---|
| "Romantica" | Tony Dallara | Renato Rascel | Dino Verde; Renato Rascel | 1 |
| "Libero" | Domenico Modugno | Teddy Reno | Domenico Modugno; Franco Migliacci | 2 |
| "Quando vien la sera" | Wilma De Angelis | Joe Sentieri | Alberto Testa; Carlo Alberto Rossi | 3 |
| "Colpevole" | Nilla Pizzi | Tonina Torrielli | Vincenzo D'Acquisto; Saverio Seracini | 4 |
| "È mezzanotte" | Joe Sentieri | Sergio Bruni | Alberto Testa; Rinaldo Cozzoli; Giulio Compare | 5 |
| "Il mare" | Giorgio Consolini | Sergio Bruni | Antonio Pugliese; Vian | 6 |
| "Noi" | Jula De Palma | Tony Dallara | Bruno Pallesi; Walter Malgoni | 7 |
| "È vero" | Teddy Reno | Mina | Nisa; Umberto Bindi | 8 |
| "Splende il sole" | Fausto Cigliano | Irene D'Areni | Pinchi; Danpa; Panzuti | 9 |
| "Notte mia" | Johnny Dorelli | Jula De Palma | Zanfagna; Marcello De Martino | 10 |
| "A come amore" | Flo Sandon's | Gloria Christian | Bruno Brighetti; Bruno Martino | Eliminated |
| "Amore abisso dolce" | Achille Togliani | Giorgio Consolini | Gian Carlo Testoni; Marcello Gigante | Eliminated |
| "Amore senza sole" | Johnny Dorelli | Betty Curtis | Mario Panzeri; Vittorio Mascheroni | Eliminated |
| "Gridare di gioia" | Germana Caroli | Arturo Testa | Fanciulli; Arturo Testa | Eliminated |
| "Invoco te" | Gino Latilla | Miranda Martino | Gian Carlo Testoni; Tony De Vita; Glauco Masetti | Eliminated |
| "Non sei felice" | Mina | Betty Curtis | Riccardo Vantellini; Pinchi | Eliminated |
| "Perderti" | Tonina Torrielli | Arturo Testa | Pinchi; Pier Emilio Bassi | Eliminated |
| "Perdoniamoci" | Achille Togliani | Nilla Pizzi | Umberto Bertini; Enzo Di Paola | Eliminated |
| "Splende l'arcobaleno" | Wilma De Angelis | Gloria Christian | Mario Tumminelli; Cosimo Di Ceglie | Eliminated |
| "Vento pioggia... scarpe rotte" | Gino Latilla | Miranda Martino | Eduardo Taranto; Coriolano Gori; Alfio Grasso | Eliminated |

== Broadcasts ==
=== Local broadcast ===
All shows were broadcast on RAI Televisione and Secondo Programma, beginning at 22:00 CET.

=== International broadcast ===
Known details on the broadcasts in each country, including the specific broadcasting stations and commentators are shown in the tables below.

International broadcasters of the Sanremo Music Festival 1960
| Country | Broadcaster | Channel(s) | Commentator(s) | Ref(s) |
|---|---|---|---|---|
| Belgium | NIR | NIR | | |
| Germany | ARD | Deutsches Fernsehen | | |
| Netherlands | NTS | NTS | Piet te Nuyl Jr. | |
| Soviet Union | AUR | First Programme (Note: Delayed broadcast at 2 April at 22:35 (MST)) | | |
| Switzerland | SRG SSR | TSR | RTF commentary | |
| Switzerland | SRG SSR | RSI (Note: Deferred broadcast on the following day at 12:40 (CET)) | | |
| United Kingdom | BBC | BBC Television Service (Note: Deferred broadcast on the same day of the final at 20:30 (BST)) | | |
