= Renato Rascel =

Italian actor (1912–1991)

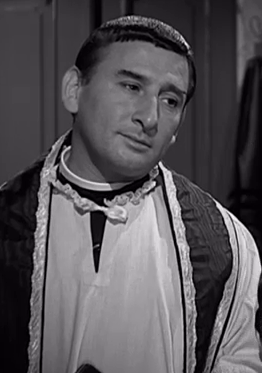
- Rascel in Oh! Sabella (1957)
- Born: Renato Ranucci; 27 April 1912; Turin, Italy
- Died: 2 January 1991 (aged 78); Rome, Italy
- Occupations: Actor, singer
- Years active: 1942–1972
- Website: renatorascel.com

Renato Ranucci (Italian pronunciation: [reˈnaːto raˈnuttʃi]; 27 April 1912 – 2 January 1991), known by the stage name Renato Rascel (pronounced [ˈraʃʃel]), was an Italian film actor and singer. He appeared in 50 films between 1942 and 1972. He represented Italy in the Eurovision Song Contest 1960 with the song "Romantica", which tied for eighth place out of thirteen entries.

== Biography ==
Rascel was born to Cesare and Paola Ranucci in Turin. His parents were opera singers, and Renato evidently was born in the back stage of a theater. His father tried to make it up to him by having him baptized at Saint Peter's in Rome. Renato later sang with the "white voices choir" of Saint Peter under the leadership of composer-conductor Lorenzo Perosi.

At the age of 14 Renato started to play drums in ballrooms around Rome. Soon after, he joined the Di Fiorenza Sisters as an actor, dancer and clown and in 1934 he was hired for his first big role by the Schwarts Brothers in the operetta "Al Cavallino bianco". In 1935, he joined Elena Gray for his first foreign tour in Africa.

In 1941 he created his own theater company and he began to develop his distinctive kind of humor that in the following years will crown him as the inventor of the "non-sense" with phrases like "two friends that didn't know each other". He decided to make his small size work for him, being only 5'2" tall, one of his major assets becoming known as the "Tiny Italian" (il piccoletto nazionale) and in his show he accentuated his stature by wearing huge extravagant coats, his most famous one had a large pocket on the back.

In this time he created some of his most famous characters such as "Napoleon" and "Il Corazziere" (a parody on his size since the Corazziere is a military division that employs only soldiers over 6 feet tall) that brought him to an extraordinary popularity in Italy. In 1942 he shot the first of a long series of films, Pazzo d'amore (Crazy For Love) developing and establishing his very peculiar kind of humor. Among the sixty plus films he worked in, one of the most relevant was Il Cappotto (The Overcoat) by Gogol, winner of the Golden Palm in Cannes.

He also had a leading role in The Secret of Santa Vittoria with Anthony Quinn and Anna Magnani, Seven Hills of Rome with Mario Lanza, Questi fantasmi with Eduardo De Filippo and Figaro qua Figaro là with Totò. In 1977, he appeared in the Zeffirelli film Jesus of Nazareth as the blind man.

His post second World War success is due mainly to his leading roles in the musicals by Pietro Garinei and Sandro Giovannini. The artistic trio is responsible for the existence of the "musical" in Italy with Attanasio cavallo vanesio in 1952 (featuring the American trio Peters Sisters, Alvaro piuttosto corsaro (1953), Tobia la candida spia (1955), Un paio d'ali (1957), Rascelinaria (1958), Enrico '61 (1961), and also performed for an entire year in London at the Piccadilly Theatre in 1962, along with Il giorno della tartaruga (1965) and Alleluja, brava gente (1970).

In his career, Rascel had established himself as a comic and dramatic actor, dancer, singer and songwriter. His most famous composition, "Arrivederci Roma," is among the three most famous Italian songs of all time. He also wrote a number of internationally famous songs such as "Venticello de Roma", "Con un po' di fantasia", "Vogliamoci tanto bene", "Romantica", and "Te voglio bene tanto tanto".

With the arrival of the television set in the Italian household, RAI (the national Italian Television) entrusted Rascel with the role of entertaining the country in the very first live Saturday night show. Among his most memorable performances are "Rascel la nuit" in 1956 and "Stasera Rascel City" in 1964. His performance in "Father Brown" in 1970, where he interprets a priest that solves crimes in his community, was one of the biggest television successes of the decade. He represented Italy in the Eurovision Song Contest 1960 with the song "Romantica".

== Selected filmography ==
- Pazzo d'amore (1942) - Renato
- Maracatumba... ma non è una rumba! (1949) - rag. Filippo De Bellis
- Botta e risposta (1950)
- Figaro Here, Figaro There (1950) - Don Alonzo
- Beauties on Bicycles (1951) - Il figlio del meccanico
- I'm the Capataz (1951)) - Uguccione / Rascelito Villa
- Amor non ho... però... però (1951) - Teodoro
- Napoleon (1951) - Napoleone
- I'm the Hero (1952) - Righetto
- The Overcoat (1952) - Carmine De Carmine
- The Tired Outlaw (1952) - Pepito
- I Chose Love (1953) - Boris Popovic
- Piovuto dal cielo (1953) - Renato
- The Walk (1953, also director) - Paolo Barbato
- Attanasio cavallo vanesio (1953) - Fantino Leo
- Marriage (1954) - Dmitry Marinin, il 'generale'
- Gran varietà (1954) - Il comico e il censore (segment "Il censore")
- Half a Century of Song (1954)
- Questi fantasmi (1954)
- Alvaro piuttosto corsaro (1954) - Alvaro
- Carousel of Variety (1955)
- Red and Black (1955)
- Io sono la Primula Rossa (1955) - Sir Archibald
- I pinguini ci guardano (1956)
- The Monte Carlo Story (1956) - Duval
- Oh! Sabella (1957) - Don Gregorio (uncredited)
- Arrivederci Roma (1957) - Pepe Bonelli
- Rascel-Fifì (1957) - Renato / Renatino - il suo figlio
- Rascel marine (1958) - Caporale Ronny Rascel
- Move and I'll Shoot (1958) - Renato Tuzzi - il professore
- Policarpo (1959) - Policarpo De Tappetti
- Uncle Was a Vampire (1959) - Il conte Osvaldo Lambertenghi
- Ferdinando I, re di Napoli (1959) - Mimi
- Un militare e mezzo (1960) - Nicola Carletti
- Little Girls and High Finance (1960)
- The Bear (1960) - Médard
- Il corazziere (1960) - Urbano Marangoni
- Sanremo - La grande sfida (1960) - Uno spettatore (uncredited)
- Destination Fury (1961) - Renato Micacci
- The Last Judgement (1961) - Coppola
- The Orderly (1961) - Remigio De Acutis
- The Four Days of Naples (1962) - Neapolitan Citizen (uncredited)
- Follie d'estate (1963) - Sognatore
- The Secret of Santa Vittoria (1969) - Babbaluche
- Il trapianto (1970) - Dario Barbieri - l'impiegato
- The Adventures of Pinocchio (1972) - Narrator (voice)
- Jesus of Nazareth (1977, TV Mini-Series) - The Blind Man
