= The Cay (film) =

1974 American television survival film

- Genre: Adventure
- Based on: The Cay by Theodore Taylor
- Teleplay by: Russell Thacher
- Directed by: Patrick Garland
- Starring: James Earl Jones; Alfred Lutter; Gretchen Corbett
- Music by: Carl Davis
- Country of origin: United States
- Original language: English

Production
- Executive producer: Frank O'Connor
- Producers: Walter Seltzer; Russell Thacher; Ringo Fallock
- Cinematography: Alric Edens; Rosalío Solano
- Editor: Douglas Stewart
- Running time: 50 minutes
- Production companies: Universal Television; Russell Thacher-Walter Seltzer Productions

Original release
- Network: NBC
- Release: October 21, 1974

The Cay is a 1974 American adventure television film directed by Patrick Garland and written by Russell Thacher, based on the 1969 novel by Theodore Taylor. It stars James Earl Jones, Alfred Lutter, and Gretchen Corbett, and premiered on NBC on October 21, 1974.

== Plot ==
A young boy named Phillip is aboard the S.S. Hato when it is torpedoed during World War II. It soon sinks and Phillip awakens on a raft with Timothy, an older black man, and Stew Cat, a stray cat belonging to a crew member on the Hato. Phillip soon becomes blind from a head injury he suffered during the torpedoing. After days at sea, they notice a cay in the distance. They all reach the island, but Timothy, worried about what would happen to Phillip if he should die, prepares Phillip to fish and find food and be more self-reliant. When a hurricane hits the cay, Timothy ties their meager supplies to a tree and shields Phillip from the strong winds and rain that flay his whole body. When Phillip regains consciousness after the storm he finds Timothy very weak. Timothy manages to get out his last words: "Phill-eep... you.. all right... be true? Terrible tempis'...."

After Timothy's death, Phillip remains confident until a plane flies over the island without stopping for him. Phillip, who is still blind, is discouraged. But when he hears another plane, he manages to build up and ignite the signal fire that Timothy had built, throwing green branches on it to make more smoke. It becomes visible to the plane, and a boat arrives to rescue Phillip and Stew Cat. Phillip is reunited with his mother and father, and receives surgery to restore his vision. He reminisces and thinks about revisiting the cay one day, knowing he will recognize it not by sight but by sound.

== Production ==
Universal Television and Russell Thacher-Walter Seltzer Productions produced this film.

The Cay was filmed on location in Belize.

== Cast ==
- James Earl Jones as Timothy
- Alfred Lutter as Phillip
- Gretchen Corbett as Grace – Phillip's Mother

In the film (unlike the book), Phillip's father did not appear.

== Awards and nominations ==
Year	Award Show	Category	Result	Recipient(s)
1975	Humanitas Prize	60 Minutes	Nominated	Russell Thacher

== See also ==
- List of American films of 1974
- Timothy of the Cay
