= Woodland Hills, Los Angeles =

Neighborhood in California, US

Woodland Hills
- Neighborhood
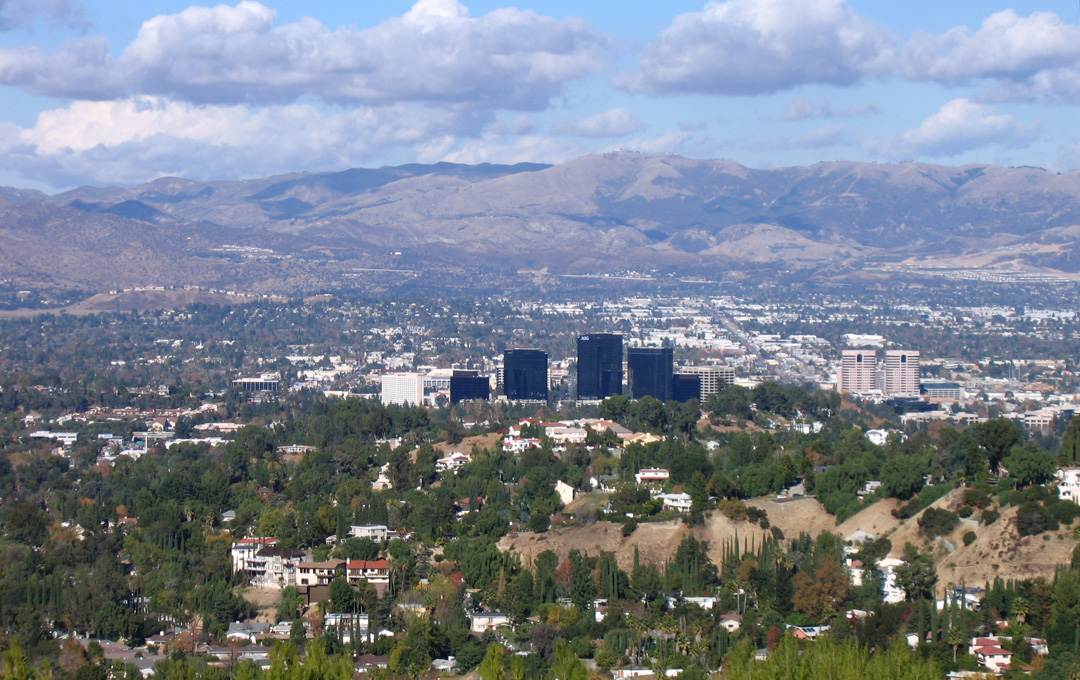
- Woodland Hills in the foreground, including Warner Center, from the Top of Topanga Overlook, 2006

- Location within Los Angeles/San Fernando Valley Woodland Hills (the Los Angeles metropolitan area)
- Coordinates: 34°10′06″N 118°36′18″W
- Country: United States
- State: California
- County: Los Angeles
- City: Los Angeles

Population (2022)
  - Total: 79,451
- Time zone: UTC−8 (PST)
  - Summer (DST): UTC−7 (PDT)
- ZIP Codes: 91364–91365, 91367
- Area codes: 747/818

Woodland Hills is a neighborhood bordering the Santa Monica Mountains in the San Fernando Valley region of Los Angeles, California, United States.

== History ==
The area was inhabited for around 8,000 years by Native Americans of the Fernandeño-Tataviam and Chumash-Venturaño tribes, who lived in the Santa Monica Mountains and Simi Hills and close to the Arroyo Calabasas (Calabasas Creek) tributary of the Los Angeles River in present-day Woodland Hills. The first Europeans to enter the San Fernando Valley were the Portola Expedition in 1769, exploring Alta California for Spanish mission and settlement locations. Seeing it from present-day Sepulveda Pass, the oak savanna inspired them to call the area El Valle de Santa Catalina de Bononia de Los Encinos (Valley of St. Catherine of Bononia of the Oaks). The Mission San Fernando Rey de España (Mission San Fernando) was established in 1797 and controlled the valley's land, including future Woodland Hills.

Ownership of the southern half of the valley, south of present-day Roscoe Boulevard from Toluca Lake to Woodland Hills, by Americans began in the 1860s. First, Isaac Lankershim (as the "San Fernando Farm Homestead Association") in 1869, then Isaac Lankershim's son, James Boon Lankershim, and Isaac Newton Van Nuys (as the "Los Angeles Farm & Milling Company") in 1873, and finally, in the "biggest land transaction ever recorded in Los Angeles County", a syndicate led by Harry Chandler of the Los Angeles Times with Hobart Johnstone Whitley, Gen. Moses Sherman, and others (as the Los Angeles Suburban Homes Company) in 1910.

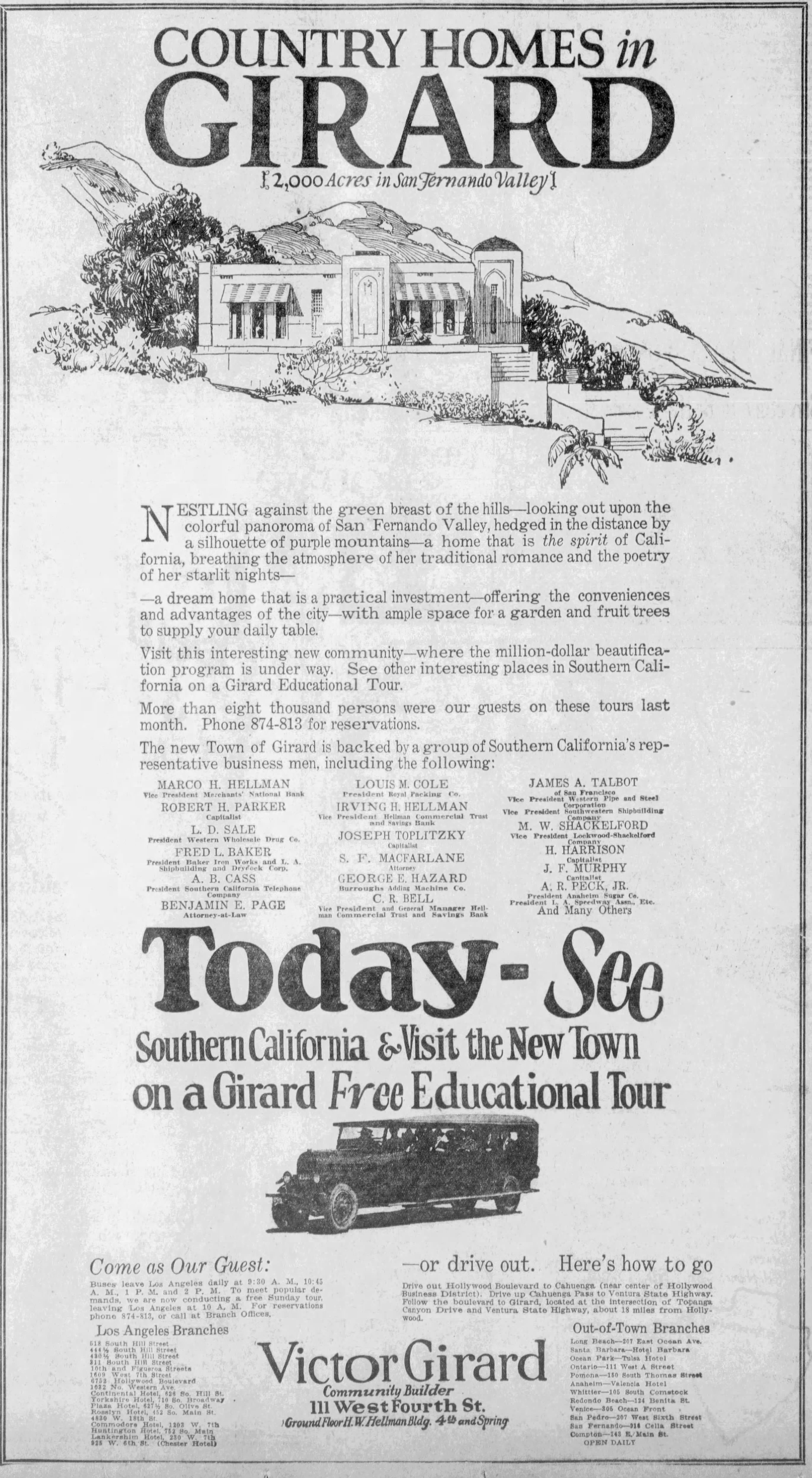
"Country Homes in Girard" Los Angeles Evening Express, November 17, 1923

Victor Girard Kleinberger bought 2,886 acres (1,168 ha) in the area from Chandler's group and founded the town of Girard in 1922. He sought to attract residents and businesses by developing an infrastructure, advertising in newspapers, and planting 120,000 trees. His 300 pepper trees, forming a canopy over Canoga Avenue between Ventura Boulevard and Saltillo Street, became Los Angeles Historic-Cultural Monument #93 in 1972. c. 1939 the area was described as "A small business district on Ventura Boulevard at Topanga Canyon Junction. The population is scattered, being found mostly throughout the surrounding agricultural country." The community of Girard was eventually incorporated into Los Angeles, and in 1945, it became known as Woodland Hills. Reference to the founding of Girard is part of the story arc in the first season of Perry Mason (2020).

== Geography ==
Woodland Hills is in the southwestern region of the San Fernando Valley neighborhoods of Los Angeles. To the north are West Hills, Canoga Park, and Winnetka; to the east is Tarzana; to the south are the Santa Monica Mountains; and to the west are the cities of Calabasas and Hidden Hills.

Running east–west through the community are U.S. Route 101 (the Ventura Freeway) and Ventura Boulevard, the Valley's main thoroughfare, whose western terminus is at Valley Circle Boulevard in Woodland Hills.

=== Climate ===
Woodland Hills can experience some of the more extreme temperature changes from season to season than other regions of the San Fernando Valley. During summer days, temperatures in Woodland Hills are often very high, and overnight winter temperatures can be among the lowest of the Valley. On September 6, 2020, Woodland Hills recorded the highest temperature ever in Los Angeles County, hitting 121 °F (49 °C) at Pierce College, tying with Chino's reading as the highest temperature on record in Southern California's coastal basin. The climate is classified as a hot-summer Mediterranean climate (Csa) in the Köppen climate classification, which is characterized by mild, rainy winters and hot, dry summers. Precipitation in Woodland Hills averages much the same as most other regions of the west San Fernando Valley, although somewhat higher amounts of rainfall occur in the surrounding hills.

Climate data for Woodland Hills, Los Angeles (Pierce College), 1991–2020 normals, extremes 1949–present
Month	Jan	Feb	Mar	Apr	May	Jun	Jul	Aug	Sep	Oct	Nov	Dec	Year
Record high °F (°C)	93 (34)	94 (34)	101 (38)	105 (41)	113 (45)	113 (45)	119 (48)	116 (47)	122 (50)	113 (45)	101 (38)	96 (36)	122 (50)
Mean maximum °F (°C)	82.9 (28.3)	83.7 (28.7)	88.3 (31.3)	94.6 (34.8)	97.8 (36.6)	102.4 (39.1)	106.5 (41.4)	108.0 (42.2)	107.3 (41.8)	100.4 (38.0)	91.1 (32.8)	82.4 (28.0)	110.5 (43.6)
Mean daily maximum °F (°C)	69.8 (21.0)	70.0 (21.1)	74.0 (23.3)	78.0 (25.6)	82.0 (27.8)	88.5 (31.4)	95.1 (35.1)	97.4 (36.3)	93.9 (34.4)	85.2 (29.6)	76.4 (24.7)	68.9 (20.5)	81.6 (27.6)
Daily mean °F (°C)	56.4 (13.6)	56.8 (13.8)	59.9 (15.5)	63.7 (17.6)	67.8 (19.9)	72.7 (22.6)	78.0 (25.6)	79.1 (26.2)	76.2 (24.6)	69.0 (20.6)	61.2 (16.2)	55.5 (13.1)	66.3 (19.1)
Mean daily minimum °F (°C)	43.1 (6.2)	43.6 (6.4)	45.9 (7.7)	48.1 (8.9)	52.6 (11.4)	56.9 (13.8)	60.8 (16.0)	60.8 (16.0)	58.5 (14.7)	52.9 (11.6)	46.0 (7.8)	42.0 (5.6)	50.9 (10.5)
Mean minimum °F (°C)	30.2 (−1.0)	32.0 (0.0)	34.7 (1.5)	37.5 (3.1)	42.3 (5.7)	47.6 (8.7)	52.3 (11.3)	52.5 (11.4)	48.2 (9.0)	42.0 (5.6)	33.6 (0.9)	29.5 (−1.4)	27.8 (−2.3)
Record low °F (°C)	19 (−7)	18 (−8)	26 (−3)	30 (−1)	33 (1)	36 (2)	42 (6)	42 (6)	38 (3)	27 (−3)	23 (−5)	20 (−7)	18 (−8)
Average precipitation inches (mm)	3.73 (95)	4.62 (117)	2.66 (68)	0.80 (20)	0.36 (9.1)	0.06 (1.5)	0.04 (1.0)	trace	0.09 (2.3)	0.56 (14)	0.83 (21)	2.66 (68)	16.41 (417)
Average precipitation days (≥ 0.01 in)	6.4	6.8	5.5	2.4	1.5	0.3	0.4	0.2	0.5	1.8	3.1	5.9	34.8
Source: NOAA

== Demographics ==
In 2008, the population of Woodland Hills was approximately 63,000. The median age in 2000 was 40.

As of the 2000 census, and according to the Los Angeles Almanac, there were 67,006 people and 29,119 households residing in Woodland Hills. The racial makeup of the neighborhood was 79.90% White, 6.97% Asian, 0.13% Pacific Islander, 3.34% African American, 0.33% Native American, 4.80% from other races, and 4.52% from two or more races. 11.94% of the population were Hispanic of any race.

In population, it is one of Los Angeles's least dense neighborhoods, and the proportion of white people is high for the county. The percentage of residents 25 and older with four-year college degrees is 47.0%, which was high for both the city and the county. The percentage of veterans, 10.7%, was high for the city of Los Angeles and for the county overall. The percentage of veterans who served during World War II or Korea was among the county's highest.

The 2008 Los Angeles Times's "Mapping L.A." project supplied these Woodland Hills neighborhood statistics: population: 59,661; median household income: $93,720. The Times said the latter figure was "high for the city of Los Angeles and high for the county."

Iranian (8.8%) and German (7.8%) were the most common ancestries in 2000. Iran (27.7%) and the United Kingdom (4.8%) were the most common foreign places of birth.

== Arts and culture ==
The Los Angeles Public Library operates the Woodland Hills Branch Library (Ventura Boulevard) and the Platt Branch Library (Victory Boulevard) in Woodland Hills.

== Parks and recreation ==
Woodland Hills is home to the Woodland Hills Country Club, a private equity golf club. The club has a golf course, fine dining, and entertainment options.

The Woodland Hills Recreation Center (Shoup Park) is a 19-acre (7.7 ha) park in Woodland Hills. The park has a small indoor gymnasium without weights and with a capacity of 300 people, it may be used as an auditorium. The park also has a lighted baseball diamond, outdoor lighted basketball courts, a children's play area, a lighted football field, picnic tables, a lighted soccer field, and lighted tennis courts. Woodland Hills Pool is an outdoor seasonal unheated swimming pool.

The Warner Center Park, also known as Warner Ranch Park, is in Woodland Hills. The park, unstaffed and unlocked, has a children's play area and picnic tables. Serrania Park in Woodland Hills is an unstaffed, unlocked pocket park. It has a children's play area, hiking trails, and picnic tables. Alizondo Drive Park in Woodland Hills is an unstaffed, unlocked, and undeveloped park used for brush clearance once per year.

Along Woodland Hills's western boundary is the large Upper Las Virgenes Canyon Open Space Preserve, a regional park with a trail network for miles of hiking, mountain biking, and equestrian rides. The trailhead and parking are at the very western end of Victory Boulevard. Scheduled walks and programs are offered. The Santa Monica Mountains National Recreation Area has various parks south of the community. The Top of Topanga Overlook gives panoramic views of the verdant Woodland Hills neighborhoods and the Valley.

== Government ==
=== Local government ===
Woodland Hills Warner Center Neighborhood Council is the local elected advisory body to the city of Los Angeles representing stakeholders in the Woodland Hills and Warner Center areas.

Woodland Hills is in Los Angeles City Council District 3, represented by Bob Blumenfield.

=== State representation ===
Woodland Hills is in California's 46th State Assembly district, represented by Democrat Jesse Gabriel, and California's 27th State Senate district, represented by Democrat Henry Stern.

=== Federal representation ===
- Woodland Hills is represented in the United States Senate by Adam Schiff and Alex Padilla.
- Woodland Hills is in California's 32nd congressional district, represented by Democrat Brad Sherman.

== Education ==
=== Primary and secondary schools ===
==== Public schools ====
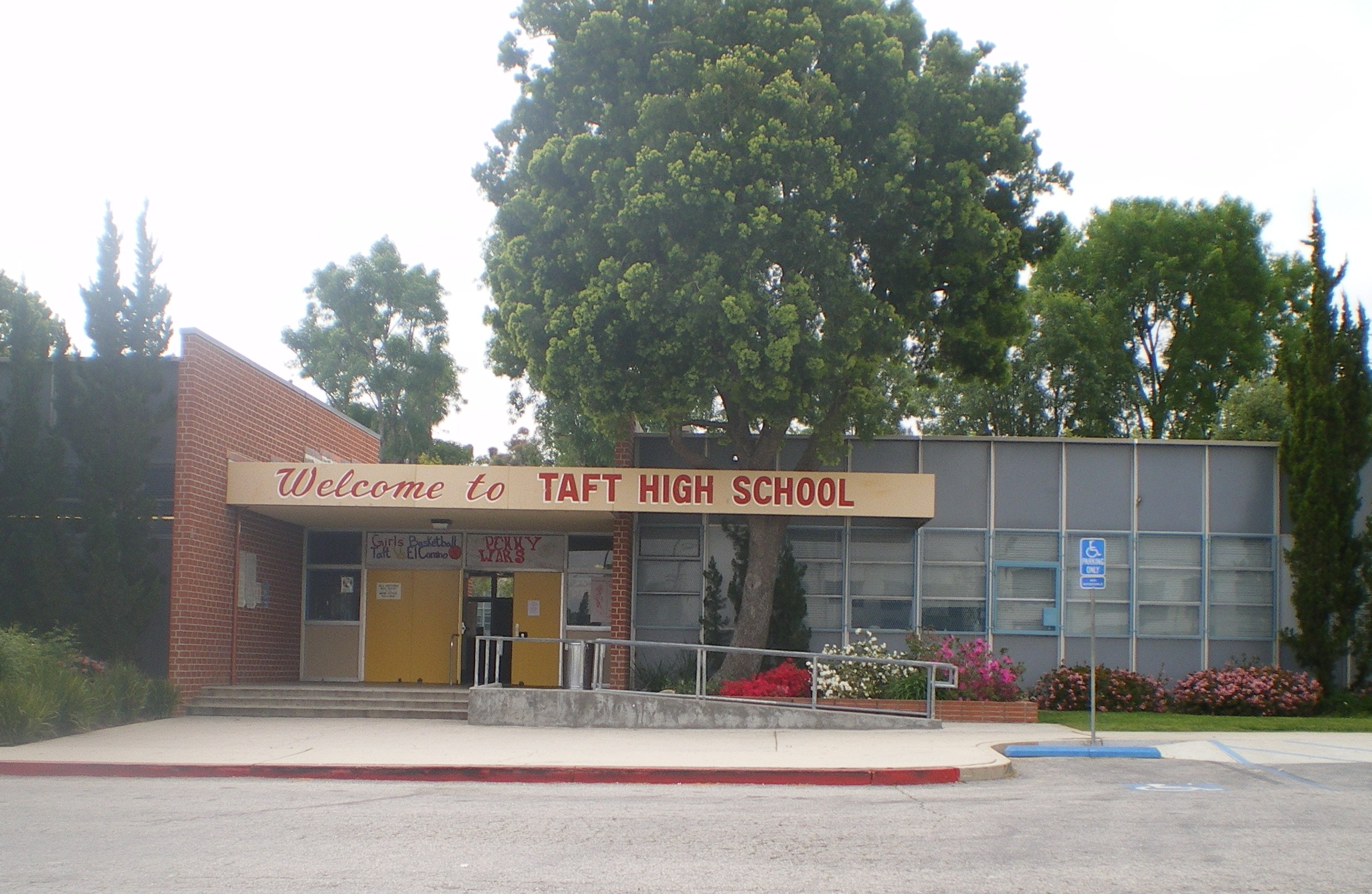
William Howard Taft High School

Public schools serving Woodland Hills are under the jurisdiction of the Los Angeles Unified School District. Much of the area is within Board District 4.

Elementary schools include:

- Calabash Street Elementary School
- Lockhurst Elementary School
- Serrania Elementary School
- Woodlake Avenue Elementary School
- Woodland Hills Charter for Enriched Studies
- Ivy Academia Entrepreneurial Charter School
- Calvert Street Elementary School

Middle schools include:

- Woodland Hills Charter Academy (formerly known as Parkman Middle School)
  - The school opened in 1959 as "Parkman Junior High School." It received its current name in 2006.
- George Ellery Hale Charter Academy

High schools include:

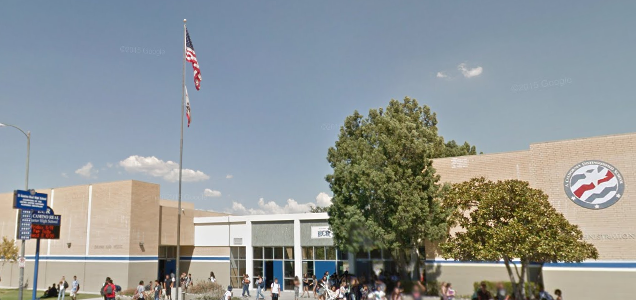
El Camino Real High School

- El Camino Real High School
- William Howard Taft High School
- Henry David Thoreau Continuation High School

Adult School:

- West Valley Occuptional Center, 6200 Winnetka Avenue

==== Charter schools ====
- El Camino Real High School (LAUSD charter)
- William Howard Taft Charter High School (LAUSD charter)
- Ingenium Charter School – Kindergarten through Sixth Grade
- George Ellery Hale Charter Academy 6–8 grade
- Chime Charter School K-8
- Serrania Charter for Enriched Studies – K-5
- Calvert School for Enriched Studies – K-5

==== Private schools ====
- The Alexandria Academy – secular school serving First through Twelfth Grade
- Halsey Schools – 6 weeks – 6 years.
- Louisville High School – All-female Catholic High School
- St. Bernardine of Siena – preschool through Eighth Grade
- St. Mel – preschool through Eighth Grade
- Woodland Hills Private School – serving Preschool (starting at 2 years old) through Fifth Grade.

Lycée International de Los Angeles had a Woodland Hills campus, which had over 140 students as of 2001. It was in a public school building rented from the Los Angeles Unified School District. In 2001 LAUSD announced that it would not renew the lease.

Lycée Français de Los Angeles operated a San Fernando Valley campus in Woodland Hills, on the site of Platt Elementary School.

=== Colleges and universities ===
Colleges and universities in Woodland Hills include:

- Los Angeles Pierce College (part of the Los Angeles Community College District)

== Infrastructure ==
Los Angeles Fire Department Station 84 (Woodland Hills) and Station 105 (Woodland Hills) serve the community.

The Los Angeles Police Department operates the Topanga Division station in Canoga Park, which provides service to the Woodland Hills area.

== Notable people ==
The Motion Picture & Television Country House and Hospital, a private retirement, nursing care and acute-care hospital facility, is reserved for industry professionals. The neighborhood includes some people who lived and/or died there, among other residents.

- Sara Paxton, actress
- Bud Abbott, actor
- Jacques Aubuchon, actor, lived in Woodland Hills at the time of his death
- Rick Auerbach, Major League Baseball player
- Orr Barouch, Israeli professional soccer player
- Justine Bateman, actress (Originally from Rye, New York)
- Roy Campanella, Major League Baseball player
- Helena Carroll, actress
- Mary Carver, actress
- Ted Cassidy, actor; his cremated remains are buried in an unmarked location at his former Woodland Hills residence
- Mary Dodson, art director
- Dr. Dre, rapper, producer, entrepreneur
- John Feldmann, musician, songwriter, and producer
- Jeff Fisher, NFL head coach, attended high school in Woodland Hills
- Andy Gibb, singer
- Raymond Greenleaf, actor
- Jody Margolin Hahn, Emmy-nominated television and film director
- Ryan Hurst, actor, producer, and director
- Buster Keaton, actor and director
- Chief Keef, rapper
- Jack Klugman, actor
- Patric Knowles, actor
- Cooper Koch, actor
- Ryan Lavarnway, Major League Baseball catcher
- Geoffrey Lewis, actor
- Mikey Madison, Academy Award winning actress
- Austin Matelson (aka Luchasaurus), professional wrestler, grew up in Woodland Hills
- Charles McPhee, author, talk-show host, "The Dream Doctor Show", Dream Researcher, 1962–2011
- Christopher Mintz-Plasse, actor
- Janel Moloney, actress
- Angelo Moore, lead singer and saxophonist of the band Fishbone, was raised in Woodland Hills
- Dolores Moran, actress
- Nichelle Nichols, actress on Star Trek: The Original Series, recruiter for NASA
- Joy Picus, City Council member, 1977–91; Ms. magazine Woman of the Year
- Stephen Roberts, actor
- Rafa Sardina, 4-time Grammy Award and 10-time Latin Grammy Award winner recording and mixing engineer resides in Woodland Hills
- Tupac Shakur, rapper, writer, and actor
- Thomas D. Shepard, City Council member, 1961–67
- Tyler Skaggs, Major League Baseball player for the Los Angeles Angels of Anaheim
- Dean Smith, Olympic sprinter, John Wayne's stuntman, and actor
- Jan Smithers, actress
- Russell Thacher (1919-1990), author and film producer who co-produced the films Soylent Green and The Last Hard Men together with Walter Seltzer
- Laurence Trimble, actor, writer, film director
- Troy Van Leeuwen, musician and record producer
- Don Van Vliet (aka Captain Beefheart), musician, singer and composer. Captain Beefheart's definitive album Trout Mask Replica was composed and rehearsed in a communal house in Woodland Hills in 1968–1969
- Robin Yount, Hall of Fame baseball player

== See also ==
- Santa Monica Mountains National Recreation Area
- Simi Hills
