= American Cinema Editors Awards 1970 =

20th ACE Eddie Awards
- Presented by: American Cinema Editors
- Date: March 14, 1970
- Site: Century Plaza Hotel, Los Angeles, California
- Hosted by: George Fenneman

Highlights
- Best Film: Hello, Dolly! True Grit

The 20th American Cinema Editors Awards, which were presented on Saturday, March 14, 1970, at The Century Plaza Hotel, honored the best editors in films and television. The award was hosted by radio and television announcer George Fenneman. Producer and director John Sturges won the "ACE Golden Eddie Filmmaker of the Year Award" for "outstanding achievements in filmmaking, climaxing a career which began in film editing.". Film producer Marvin Mirisch handed the award to Sturges. As with the previous year, clips of all the films and television series were showcased before the winners were announced.

== Nominees ==
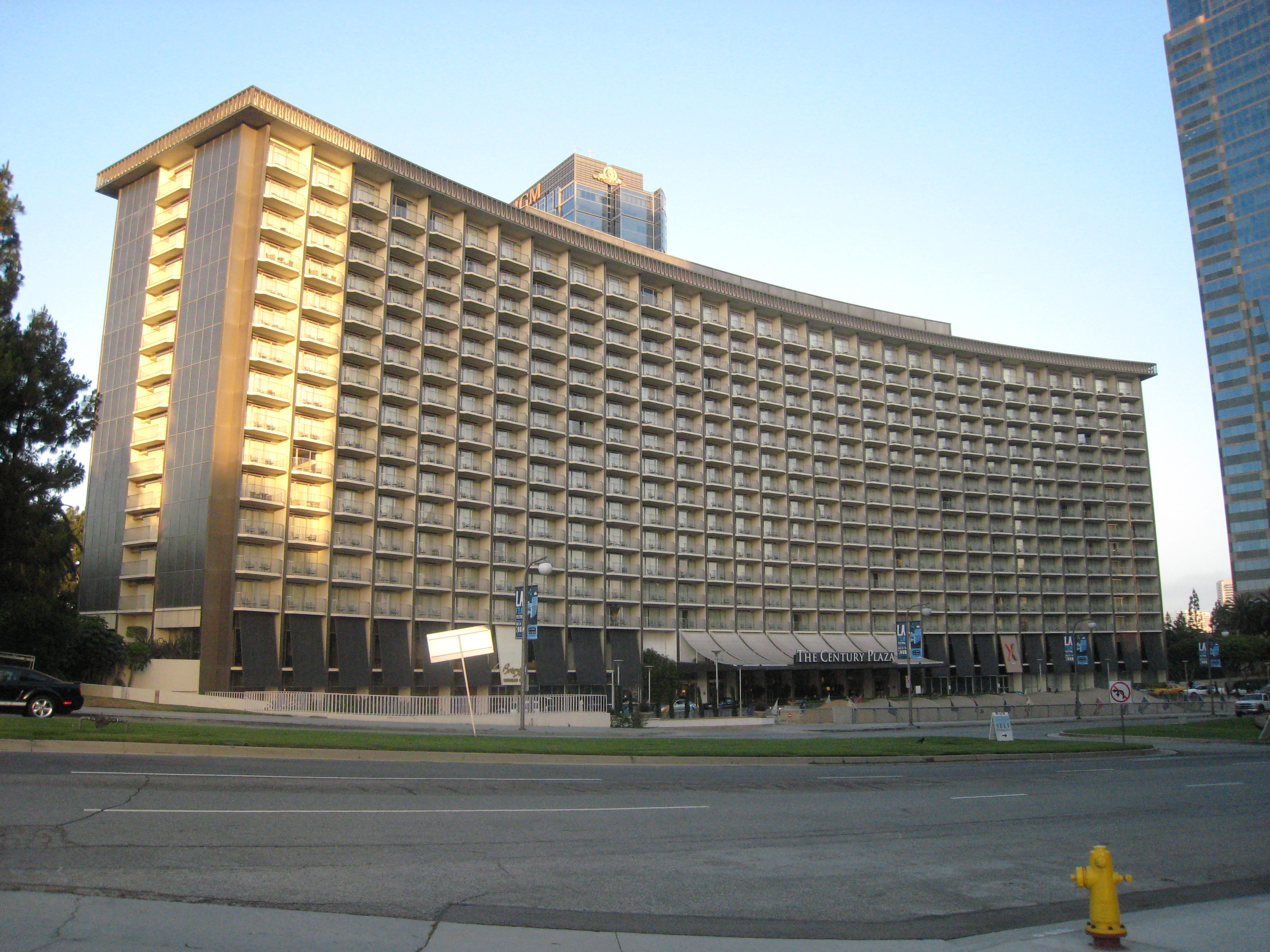
The Century Plaza Hotel, the site of the 1970 Eddies.

Best Edited Feature Film	Best Edited Television Program
Hello, Dolly! – William H. Reynolds (TIE); True Grit – Warren Low (TIE); Anne of the Thousand Days – Richard Marden; Butch Cassidy and the Sundance Kid – John C. Howard and Richard C. Meyer; The Secret of Santa Vittoria – Earle Herdan and William A. Lyon	Marcus Welby, M.D: "A Matter of Humanities" – Gene Palmer; The Bob Hope Christmas Special: Around the World with the USO – John C. Fuller, Igo Kantor, Patrick Kennedy, Frank McKelvey; Bonanza: "Dead Wrong" – Danny B. Landres; The Ghost & Mrs. Muir: "The Great Power Failure" – Axel Hubert Sr.; Hollywood: The Selznick Years – David Blewitt and Graham Lee Mahin; The Mystery of Animal Behavior – Peter C. Johnson; My World and Welcome to It: "Rally Round the Flag" – Hugh Chaloupka; Room 222: "Richie's Story" – Frank P. Keller
