= Russell Thacher =

American film producer

Russell Thacher (c. 1919 – October 1, 1990) was an American author and film producer who co-produced the films Soylent Green and The Last Hard Men together with Walter Seltzer.

Born in Hackensack, New Jersey, Thatcher attended New York University and Bucknell University, before serving in the United States Navy during World War II.

In addition to working as an editor at Omnibook Magazine and the Book-of-the-Month Club, Thacher authored the novels The Captain, The Tender Age and A Break in the Clouds. The Captain, Thacher's first novel, is set on board a Landing Ship, Tank in the Pacific War. The novel is notable for its early positive portrayal of homosexuality, exemplified in the characters of two crew members, though male eroticism is an undercurrent throughout the book. It was published by Macmillan in New York in 1951 and Allan Wingate in London in 1952, with subsequent paperback editions. In The Tender Age, Thacher writes about the experiences of a 17-year-old boy growing up in a town in New Jersey.

In 1963, he was hired by Metro-Goldwyn-Mayer, originally working for the firm in New York City before heading out west, where he was the studio's vice president for production. By the early 1970s was working on his own as a film producer. Together with Walter Seltzer, Thacher co-produced Soylent Green, the 1973 science fiction thriller, and The Last Hard Men, a 1976 Western prison break film; both films starred Charlton Heston. Other films he produced include Travels with My Aunt and The Cay, for which he wrote the teleplay.

A resident of Woodland Hills, Los Angeles, Thacher died in Los Angeles at the age of 71 due to complications resulting from abdominal surgery, on October 1, 1990.
