= George Glass =

American film producer and publicist (1910-1984)

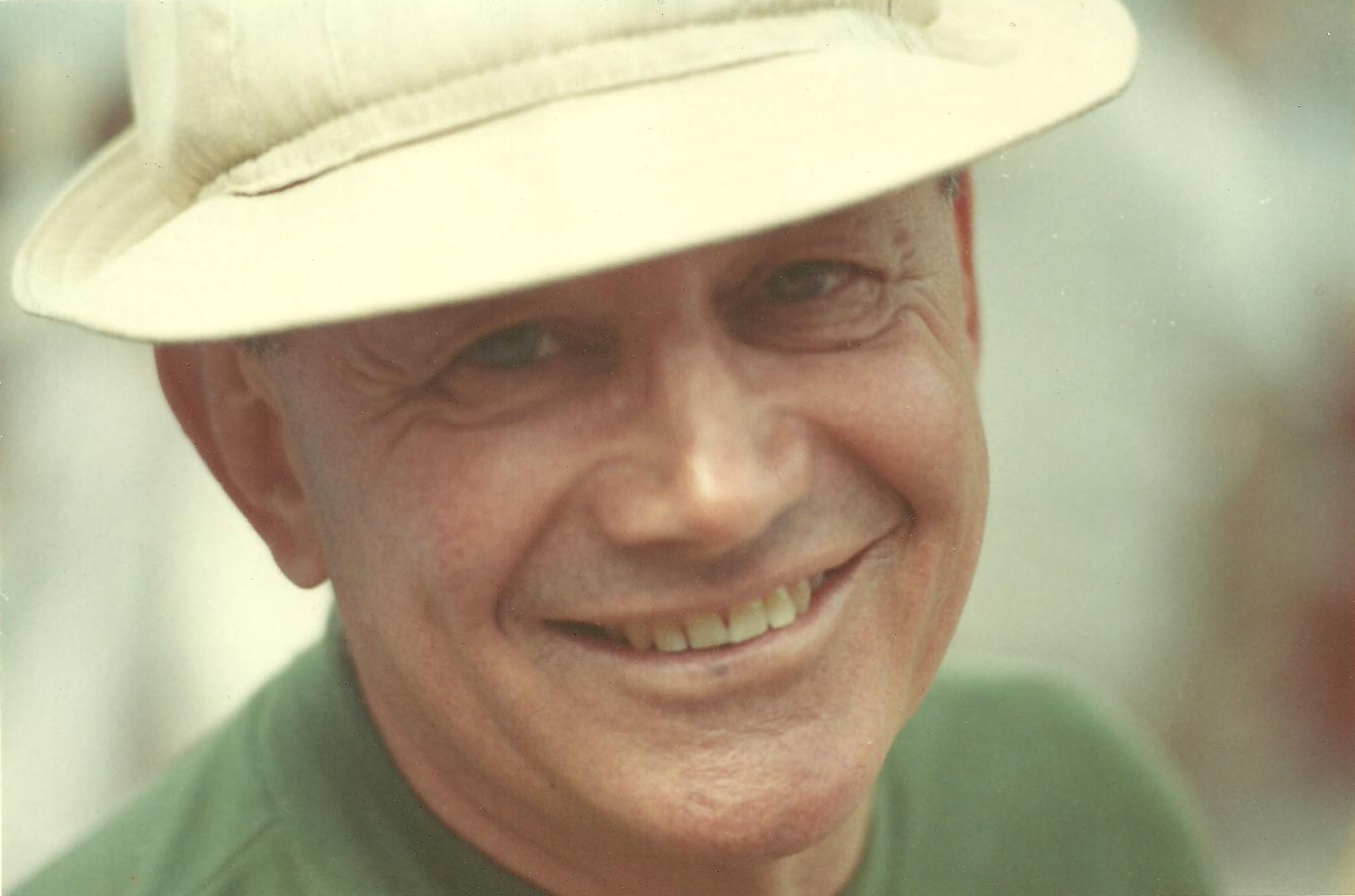
- George Glass c.1960
- Born: August 19, 1910; Los Angeles, California, U.S.
- Died: April 1, 1984 (aged 73); Ventura, California, U.S.
- Occupations: Film producer, publicist
- Years active: 1936–1971
- Spouse: Harriet Glass (née Galblum)

George Glass (August 19, 1910 – April 1, 1984) was an American film producer and publicist, best known for his work with Stanley Kramer. In Kramer's 1997 autobiography, describing how he formed his first production company in the late 1940s, he called Glass "one of the best publicity men in town", and remarked "I was fortunate to get Glass, with whom I had worked in the Lewin-Loew partnership before the war. He was a bright man and a very smooth operator." In a 1973 biography of Marlon Brando, Bob Thomas wrote:

George Glass was a veteran of movie publicity, but he was more than a publicist for Kramer. He, Kramer and Carl Foreman were partners in the independent film company, and Glass's brilliant campaigns for Champion and Home of the Brave had been a major part of the company's success. A short, stubby, ebullient man, he performed his craft on the basis of telling the truth.

== Career ==
Glass began his career in the entertainment industry as a radio news commentator and sports broadcaster, but left radio for films in 1936 to work in advertising and publicity capacities for Samuel Goldwyn, United Artists, and others. With Kramer's company, in addition to being the head publicist, Glass often acted as associate producer, sometimes uncredited (as for High Noon), and sometimes with screen credit (as for Cyrano de Bergerac and The Men). Other productions from this period include Death of a Salesman and The Wild One, for which Glass suggested the title.

In 1956, Glass joined the executive staff of Hecht-Lancaster as vice president in charge of publicity, and managed the campaign for Trapeze. Later that year he and Walter Seltzer started a freelance publicity organization, described in the press as a collaboration of "two of the most experienced and able drum beaters" in Hollywood, and Frank Sinatra later singled out their work in describing “how press agentry was often responsible for saving films.” After Brando formed his own production company, Pennebaker Productions, Glass and Seltzer joined him as executive producers, and together they turned out a number of films including Shake Hands with the Devil, The Naked Edge, Paris Blues and One-Eyed Jacks.

Glass was elected to the executive board of the Screen Producers Guild in 1960, along with Mervyn LeRoy. He continued to work with Kramer for many years as an associate producer, with additional credits including Guess Who's Coming to Dinner,The Secret of Santa Vittoria, Bless the Beasts and Children and R. P. M.

== Congressional testimony ==
In January 1952, Glass testified before the House Committee on Un-American Activities. In his testimony, he described attending gatherings at the homes of Ring Lardner, Jr. and other members of the entertainment industry in the mid-1940s, at which he was urged to become a member of the Communist Political Association.

== Publicity stunts ==
To promote So Ends Our Night, Glass arranged for a member of the cast, Gerta Rozan, to stage a protest outside of the offices of film’s producers, David L. Loew and Albert Lewin. Rozan claimed to be upset that her big scene had been cut out of the film, and while carrying a picket sign reading “DON’T SEE ‘SO ENDS OUR NIGHT’ – LOEW-LEWIN UNFAIR TO GERTA ROZAN,” she told the press that she would take off an article of clothing each day until her demand for its reinstatement was met. After successively removing her blouse, skirt, and slip, by the third or fourth day (sources differ) she was left wearing only a black bra and panties, at which point a representative of the production company – variously reported as Kramer (who worked on the film as a production assistant), Loew and Lewin, or Glass himself – rushed out of the building, covered Rozan with a coat, and escorted her inside where negotiations ensued and her request was granted. The “strip picket” story and accompanying photographs were widely published in newspapers for the duration of the event, and Time magazine described it as the “best all-round publicity stunt of the season.”

In anticipation of the release of New Wine (later retitled The Great Awakening), Glass arranged for actress Eleanor Counts to pose in a bathing suit at a winery in what is today Rancho Cucamonga, California, standing beneath a large vat of champagne. A spigot was opened, the press photographed Counts being thoroughly showered with the beverage, and Life magazine subsequently published a photo of this event as its Picture of the Week. Days later, for a lavish press preview event for the film held at the same venue, Glass orchestrated the ceremonious burial of a time capsule filled with film industry memorabilia, reportedly including "a sarong from Dorothy Lamour, a curl from Mary Pickford’s hair, a banned sweater from Lana Turner, stockings from Marlene Dietrich," and "a fake mustache and a vest" donated by Charlie Chaplin.

== Quotations ==
Glass is credited by several sources with originating the witticism, "An actor is a kind of guy who if you ain't talking about him [, he] ain't listening." That line has also been attributed to Brando, who reportedly heard it from Glass and quoted it many times. In a similar vein, columnist Mike Connolly ascribed to Glass the quip "An actor's concern for others ends where his inconvenience begins."

== Filmography ==
=== Publicist (uncredited) ===
- Intermezzo (1939)
- So Ends Our Night (1941)
- New Wine (retitled The Great Awakening) (1941)
- The Gold Rush (1942 re-release)
- In Which We Serve (1942)
- The Moon and Sixpence (1942)
- Sensations of 1945 (1944)
- Blood on the Sun (1945)
- Guest Wife (1946)
- A Night in Casablanca (1946)
- The Private Affairs of Bel Ami (1947)
- So This Is New York (1948)
- Champion (1949)
- Home of the Brave (1949)
- My Six Convicts (1952)
- The Sniper (1952)
- The Member of the Wedding (1952)
- The Wild One (1953)
- The Caine Mutiny (1954)
- Trapeze (1956)

=== Producer ===
- The Men (1950), Associate Producer
- Cyrano de Bergerac (1950), Associate Producer
- Death of a Salesman (1951), Associate Producer
- High Noon (1952), Associate Producer (uncredited)
- Shake Hands with the Devil (1959), Executive Producer
- One-Eyed Jacks (1961), Executive Producer
- Paris Blues (1961), Executive Producer
- The Naked Edge (1961), Producer
- Guess Who's Coming to Dinner (1967), Associate Producer
- The Secret of Santa Vittoria (1969), Associate Producer
- R. P. M. (1970), Associate Producer
- Bless the Beasts and Children (1971), Associate Producer
