= The Cay =

1969 young adult novel by Theodore Taylor

- Author: Theodore Taylor
- Genre: Survival
- Publisher: Avon
- Publication date: 1969
- Publication place: United States
- Media type: Print (Hardback & Paperback)
- Pages: 105 pp (first edition, paperback)
- ISBN: 0-380-01003-8
- OCLC: 26874149
- Followed by: Timothy of the Cay

The Cay is a young adult novel written by Theodore Taylor. It was published in 1969.

Taylor took only three weeks to write The Cay, having contemplated the story for over a decade after reading about an 11-year-old who was aboard the Dutch ship Hato when it was torpedoed in 1942, and who was last seen by other stranded survivors as he drifted away on a life raft. The novel was published in 1969 and was dedicated to Martin Luther King Jr.

== Plot ==
During the outbreak of World War II, 11-year-old Phillip Enright and his mother decide to leave Curaçao for Virginia, aboard the S.S. Hato. This decision is driven by Phillip's mother's concern over the increasing danger posed by German submarines surrounding Curaçao. Tragically, the ship is torpedoed, resulting in Phillip becoming stranded at sea with an elderly black man named Timothy and a cat named Stew Cat.

While adrift, Phillip loses his sight, a condition Timothy attributes to Phillip staring at the sun too long. Eventually, they find a small island in a region known as Devil's Mouth. On this cay, which measured only one mile in length and half a mile in width, they build a hut and mark the passage of days by placing pebbles in a can. With limited supplies, they survive for two months by fishing and collecting rainwater. Despite initial communication barriers due to their different backgrounds, Phillip and Timothy develop a deep friendship. Timothy cares for Phillip and teaches him essential survival skills, enabling Phillip to become self-sufficient.

Although airplanes fly over the cay, they fail to spot Phillip and Timothy, prolonging their ordeal. A devastating hurricane later strikes, destroying their shelter. Timothy protects Phillip by tying them both to a palm tree, but he succumbs to exposure. Phillip, heartbroken, buries Timothy and is eventually rescued by a navy vessel. After their rescue, Phillip undergoes multiple surgeries to restore his sight, which had been lost due to nerve damage caused by a head injury from falling timber during the shipwreck. Inspired by his experience, Phillip aspires to become a sea explorer and hopes to one day locate the cay where he and Timothy had been stranded, confident he could identify it even with his eyes closed.

== Characters ==
Phillip Enright: A 11-12-year-old boy who becomes marooned on a cay with Timothy. Initially prejudiced against Timothy due to his race, Phillip grows to appreciate and rely on him, forming a strong bond.

Timothy: A West Indian native from Charlotte Amalie in Saint Thomas. He is stranded with Phillip and uses his extensive survival knowledge to care for and teach Phillip to be self-sufficient. Despite his superstitions, Timothy proves to be wise and patient.

Stew Cat: The cat who accompanies Phillip and Timothy as a fellow castaway, initially belonging to a cook on the S.S. Hato.

Grace Enright: Phillip's mother who accompanies Phillip on the S.S. Hato headed for Virginia and becomes separated from him when it sinks. She is visibly uncomfortable in Curaçao due to her racial prejudices against the local population.

Phillip Enright Sr.: Phillip's father, who relocates the family to the Dutch West Indies for government-related work. He works in an oil refinery that increases the production of aviation gas.

Henrik van Boven: Phillip's Dutch friend in Curaçao, who is puzzled by Grace's racial prejudices.

== Racism ==
In the novel, the theme of racial prejudice is explored through the character of Grace, Phillip's mother. She expresses a longing for her home in Virginia and discomfort living in Curaçao due to her prejudices against the predominantly Black bay workers in the area. Grace's discomfort and biases lead her to instruct her son, Phillip, and his friend Henrik to avoid the bay area, a directive that Henrik finds puzzling and unusual.

As the story progresses, Phillip, influenced by his mother's attitudes, begins to adopt similar prejudices, initially directed towards Timothy, the elderly Black man with whom Phillip becomes stranded. However, Phillip's views begin to change as he spends more time with Timothy and recognizes their shared humanity. A pivotal moment occurs when Timothy reveals his origins from Charlotte Amalie on St. Thomas. Phillip, surprised, responds by noting that this makes Timothy an American, referencing the American purchase of the Virgin Islands from Denmark as a result of the Treaty of the Danish West Indies. Timothy's casual indifference to this fact contrasts with Phillip's initial curiosity about Timothy's background, highlighting Phillip's growing awareness and questioning of his preconceived notions.

Phillip's transformation accelerates when he becomes blind and must rely on Timothy for survival. This dependency shifts the dynamic between them. Timothy's extensive knowledge of the Caribbean islands and survival skills, including building shelter, gathering food, and sourcing water, astonishes Phillip. Through Timothy's patient teaching, Phillip learns to be self-sufficient, fostering mutual respect and a deep bond between them. The culmination of this bond is evident in Phillip's profound grief at Timothy's death. After a hurricane devastates their shelter, Timothy succumbs to exposure, and Phillip, devastated, digs a grave for him and mourns deeply. This emotional response signifies the profound impact Timothy had on Phillip's life and perspective.

Upon returning to Curaçao, Phillip spends significant time with the workers at St. Anna Bay, many of whom knew and remembered Timothy fondly. Phillip's interactions with these individuals further underscore his transformation. He no longer harbors the prejudices he once did and feels a deep connection to the community that Timothy was a part of. This evolution marks a complete departure from his earlier, biased views, demonstrating the powerful impact of his experiences on the cay and his relationship with Timothy.

== Controversy ==
The Cay was both widely acclaimed and criticized for its impact on promoting racial harmony, and it received the Jane Addams Children's Book Award in 1970. In 1974, when NBC-TV adapted the story for a television drama, the Council on Interracial Books for Children held a press conference urging viewers to call their local stations if they felt the story contained an insidiously "racist" message. During this conference, the current chair of the Addams Award Committee, who was not in that role when the award was given, stated that she believed it was a mistake to have named The Cay an award winner due to its perceived racist theme. In response, the author, Theodore Taylor, who viewed the work as a subtle plea for better race relations and understanding, returned the award "by choice, not in anger, but with troubling questions." Taylor later reported that the award had been rescinded. Although The Cay remains listed as an Addams Award winner, Taylor's claim of rescission is widely accepted and has become a part of the discussion surrounding the book, which is required reading in many schools in the United States and internationally.

=== Censorship and banning incidents ===
In 2020, the Burbank Unified School District banned the book from the curriculum on the back of complaints from four parents who allege the material in the book could lead to potential harm to the district's Black students. The ban was opposed by organizations such as PEN America and the National Coalition Against Censorship on the basis that the book helped support discussions about contemporary racism.

== Adaptation and sequel ==
- The book was adapted into a TV film in 1974 with Alfred Lutter as Phillip, James Earl Jones as Timothy, and Gretchen Corbett as Phillip's mother.
- In 1993, Taylor published Timothy of the Cay, a book which tells both of Phillip's life after and of Timothy's life before the ordeal.
