= The Naked Edge =

1961 film by Michael Anderson

- Directed by: Michael Anderson
- Screenplay by: Joseph Stefano
- Based on: First Train to Babylon; 1955 novel by Max Ehrlich
- Produced by: George Glass; Walter Seltzer; Marlon Brando Sr. (executive producer)
- Starring: Gary Cooper; Deborah Kerr
- Cinematography: Erwin Hillier; Tony White
- Edited by: Gordon Pilkington
- Music by: William Alwyn
- Distributed by: United Artists
- Release dates: May 1961 (United Kingdom); June 28, 1961 (United States)
- Running time: 97 minutes
- Countries: United Kingdom; United States
- Language: English
- Box office: $6 million (rentals) or $2.25 million

The Naked Edge is a 1961 thriller film starring Gary Cooper (in his final film role) and Deborah Kerr. The film was a British-American co-production distributed by United Artists, directed by Michael Anderson and produced by George Glass and Walter Seltzer, with Marlon Brando Sr. as executive producer. The screenplay was written by Joseph Stefano (adapted from Max Ehrlich's 1955 novel First Train to Babylon), the musical score was composed by William Alwyn, the cinematography was handled by Erwin Hillier and Tony White, and the production designer was Carmen Dillon.

The film was shot in London and at Elstree Studios, Borehamwood, Hertfordshire. Notably, the film ends with a voiceover advising audiences to not spoil the ending of the film to others, which reflected the wishes of the film poster to not allow anyone seated "during the last 13 minutes."

== Plot ==
In the aftermath of a theft and murder, Martha Radcliffe increasingly suspects her husband George, whose testimony in court convicted the main suspect, of being the real culprit.

Businessman Jason Roote is stabbed to death on a night when George and a clerk named Donald Heath are the only other employees working at the office. A mailbag full of money is stolen in the process. George sees Heath in the boiler room when he runs after the murderer right after he hears Root crying after being stabbed; George, who is seen sweating nervously both during the trial and later, insists that Heath must have been the murderer, and Heath is convicted. Several years later, a lost mailbag is found and the Radcliffes receive a long-delayed letter that was in the bag. The letter, which Martha reads, contains a blackmail threat from Jeremy Clay accusing George of the crime.

As the story unfolds, clues pointing to George quickly accumulate. These include a new business he started soon after the trial, using money that he claims to have made in the stock market; his own desperate desire for success; lying to his wife in order to secretly search for Clay; the suspicious new business with an unknown man, Morris Brooke, right after the trial; and Clay's claim, when Martha finds him, that he was an eyewitness to the crime and George was the murderer. George is astounded to hear Martha tell of Clay saying that he was there to see the crime.

George and Martha repeatedly have conversations in which she vacillates between questioning him and insisting she believes in his innocence, and he alternates between insisting that she believe in him and telling her to make up her own mind. Tension is built by the repeated appearance of George's old-style shaving razor, his insistence that Martha join him at the edge of a cliff, references to his masculine virility and his warning that Martha's investigation could threaten his business.

George initially leaves the house but returns to try and soothe Martha. While in the study, Martha comes across Clay with the razor in hand before muffling her and trying to use hot water on her. At the conclusion, Clay (the actual killer of Jason) tries to kill Martha after being seen sharpening George's razor. George rescues his wife just in time and subdues Clay as the police arrive.

== Cast ==
- Gary Cooper as George Radcliffe
- Deborah Kerr as Martha Radcliffe
- Eric Portman as Jeremy Clay
- Ray McAnally as Donald Heath
- Diane Cilento as Mrs. Heath
- Hermione Gingold as Lilly Harris
- Peter Cushing as Mr. Evan Wrack
- Michael Wilding as Morris Brooke
- Ronald Howard as Mr. Claridge
- Sandor Elès as Manfridi St John
- Wilfrid Lawson as Mr. Pom
- Helen Cherry as Miss Osborne
- Joyce Carey as Victoria Hicks
- Diane Clare as Betty
- Frederick Leister as Judge
- Martin Boddey as Jason Roote
- Peter Wayn as Chauffeur

== Reception ==
=== Critic reception ===
In the New York Times, Bosley Crowther dismissed the film as "manufactured tension of the plainest sort, worked up with illogical twists and tricks of photography and cutting by which director Michael Anderson has apparently hoped to heighten the melodramatic mood. It also has a good cast, in addition to Mr. Cooper and Miss Kerr — Eric Portman, Michael Wilding, Hermione Gingold, Diane Cilento and even Wilfred Lawson and Joyce Carey in bit roles. But it is pure claptrap entertainment—a piece of cheese, as we say, full of holes. And it is sad to see poor old Coop in it. Well, we can remember him for many better things." Variety noted, "the picture that winds up Gary Cooper’s long list of credits is a neatly constructed, thoroughly professional little suspense meller."

=== Box office ===
The film was estimated to have earned theatrical rentals worldwide of $6 million, generating $400,000 for Cooper's estate. Kinematograph Weekly said the film "clicked" at the box office.
