= Theodore Taylor (author) =

American children's writer (1921–2006)

- Born: Theodore Langhans Taylor; June 23, 1921; Statesville, North Carolina, U.S.
- Died: October 26, 2006 (aged 85); Laguna Beach, California, U.S.
- Occupation: Writer
- Spouses: Gweneth Goodwin (m. 1941; died 1977) Flora Schoenleber (m. 1981)
- Military career
- Allegiance: United States
- Branch: United States Navy
- Conflicts: World War II

Theodore Langhans Taylor (June 23, 1921 – October 26, 2006) was an American author of more than 50 fiction and non-fiction books for young adult readers, including The Cay, The Weirdo (winner of the 1992 Edgar Award for Best Young Adult Mystery), Timothy of the Cay, and The Bomb.

Taylor died on October 26, 2006, in Laguna Beach, California, from complications of a stroke.

== Early life ==
Taylor was born in Statesville, North Carolina where he lived until he was 10. He then resided in Craddock, North Carolina. He dropped out of high school at age 17 and began writing for a living.

== Career ==
During World War II Taylor served in the United States Merchant Marines. He served in the United States Navy during World War II.

Taylor worked as a press agent connected with the American film industry and wrote on the side. Early in his career he wrote fiction and non-fiction works aimed at kids. It was not until The Cay he started writing works aimed at adults.

== Notable works ==
=== The Cay ===
The Cay, Taylor's story of a racially prejudiced white boy stranded with a black man, has become perhaps the most beloved of his young adult novels. It took only three weeks to complete and has seen worldwide sales of around four million. Taylor based the character of the boy in his book on a childhood friend, named Phillip. "The one thing I remembered about [him] was that his mother had taught him to hate black people and to hate them with a passion," Taylor told a reporter from the Los Angeles Times in 1997. In the book, the boy sheds his racist views as he learns to admire and respect the black man who had rescued him from the ocean, especially after he goes blind. For a short period of time The Cay was banned and was classified as racist.

=== Timothy of the Cay ===
In 1993, Taylor wrote and published the follow-up to The Cay, which he titled Timothy of the Cay. It describes the life of Timothy before his encounter with Phillip Enright, the narrator of The Cay, and what happened to Phillip after he was rescued, by which time Timothy had been dead for almost two months.

== Other works ==
Another work by Taylor, The Maldonado Miracle was adapted into a film starring Salma Hayek.

Another work by Taylor, “Rogue Wave”, an adventure story.
