= The Bomb (Taylor novel) =

1995 novel by Theodore Taylor

- Author: Theodore Taylor
- Language: English
- Genre: Historical fiction
- Published: 1995
- Publisher: Harcourt Children's Books
- Publication place: United States
- Media type: Print
- Pages: 197 pgs
- ISBN: 9780152008673
- OCLC: 32310858

The Bomb is a 1995 novel by Theodore Taylor written about the protest against nuclear testing on Bikini Atoll after the natives are forced to move. The story mainly follows the life of Sorry Rinamu and the effect of the Able bomb tests on the natives. The imagery and historical relevance truly contributes to the heartbreaking story of the islanders. The novel is divided into three books. It was first published by Harcourt Children's Books in October 1995. The book won the 1996 Scott O'Dell Award for Historical Fiction. According to Taylor, the novel is based on his own experience aboard the USS Sumner.

== Plot summary ==
=== Book I: Bikini ===
Sorry Rinamu is a fourteen-old boy who lives on Bikini Atoll. He and the other natives live through World War II under constant threat by the Japanese soldiers occupying the island. However, American forces attack the island one day and defeat the Japanese soldiers, freeing the island. The American victors give some of the items from the Japanese base to the natives while keeping the military equipment such as weapons. Sorry receives a magazine and is amazed by the cities and things he sees inside. He later repairs the radio in the captured Japanese base and learns of the atomic bombings of Hiroshima and Nagasaki. World War II soon ends.

=== Book II: Crossroads ===
An American battleship, the USS Sumner, lands in the lagoon. A few days later, an American commander delivers the news to the natives that Bikini has been chosen as a site for Operation Crossroads, a series of nuclear tests, due to "ideal" conditions. He meets with the natives and asks them to relocate. Nine out of 11 alabs vote to move, with Sorry's uncle Abram and grandfather Jonjen casting dissenting votes. Despite their arguments that they should not submit to white men, the natives decide to relocate. The Americans tells the natives that the atoll will be returned in a few years, but Abram and Sorry believe that he is lying.

As scientists arrive on the atoll, it is being converted to a temporary military base. Abram comes up with a plan to stop the nuclear tests by sailing into the test area with a scarlet canoe, but he dies of a heart attack before he could carry out the plan. When Sorry decides that he should do it, the natives believe that he is insane. However, he is accompanied by Tara Malolo, a local teacher, and his maternal grandfather, Jonjen.

They paint a canoe bright red for visibility while the scientists prepare the aircraft Dave's Dream for the Able test.

=== Book III: The Bomb ===
Sorry, Tara and Jonjen carry out their plan, but the Dave's Dream crew fail to notice the canoe and drop the bomb. The three are killed in the blast.
