= Earle Herdan =

American film editor

- Occupation: Film editor

Earle Herdan is an American film editor. He was nominated for an Academy Award in the category Best Film Editing for the film The Secret of Santa Vittoria.

== Selected filmography ==
- The Secret of Santa Vittoria (1969; co-nominated with William Lyon)
