= Soylent Green =

1973 film by Richard Fleischer

- Theatrical release poster by John Solie
- Directed by: Richard Fleischer
- Screenplay by: Stanley R. Greenberg
- Based on: Make Room! Make Room! by Harry Harrison
- Produced by: Walter Seltzer; Russell Thacher
- Starring: Charlton Heston; Leigh Taylor-Young; Chuck Connors; Joseph Cotten; Brock Peters; Paula Kelly; Edward G. Robinson
- Cinematography: Richard H. Kline
- Edited by: Samuel E. Beetley
- Music by: Fred Myrow
- Distributed by: Metro-Goldwyn-Mayer
- Release date: April 19, 1973 (US)
- Running time: 97 minutes
- Country: United States
- Language: English
- Box office: $3.6 million (rentals)

Soylent Green is a 1973 American dystopian thriller film directed by Richard Fleischer, and starring Charlton Heston, Leigh Taylor-Young, and Edward G. Robinson in his final film role. It is loosely based on the 1966 science-fiction novel Make Room! Make Room! by Harry Harrison, with a plot that combines elements of science fiction and a police procedural. The story follows a murder investigation in a dystopian future of dying oceans and a year-round heat wave caused by the greenhouse effect, with the resulting pollution, depleted resources, poverty, crime, and overpopulation.

The film was released on April 19, 1973, by Metro-Goldwyn-Mayer, and met with mixed reactions from critics, while earning $3.6 million at the box office. In 1973, it won the Nebula Award for Best Dramatic Presentation and the Saturn Award for Best Science Fiction Film.

== Plot ==
By 2022, the cumulative effects of overpopulation, global warming, and pollution have caused ecocide, leading to severe worldwide shortages of food, water, and housing, bringing human civilization to the brink of collapse. New York City has a population of 40 million, and only the elite can afford spacious apartments, clean water, and natural food in walled-off communities patrolled by armed guards. Their homes are fortified, with moats, security systems, and bodyguards for their tenants. Usually they keep sex slaves, referred to as "furniture", who have no human rights and are passed from one apartment owner to the next. Meanwhile, the majority live in squalor, haul water from communal spigots, and eat highly processed food wafers made by the Soylent Corporation — a large food processing firm. The Soylent Corporation's mainstay products, Soylent Red and Soylent Yellow, are staple foods. Their latest product, a new, more nutritious and more flavorful wafer said to be derived from plankton, Soylent Green, is being introduced to the populace.

NYPD Detective Robert Thorn lives in a cramped apartment with his aged co-worker and friend Sol Roth, a brilliant former college professor and police researcher (referred to as a "Book"), who helps him with his cases. Thorn is called to investigate the murder of the wealthy and influential William R. Simonson, a member of the Soylent Corporation's board, which he suspects was an assassination. With the help of Simonson's concubine Shirl, his investigation leads to a priest whom Simonson had visited shortly before his death. Due to the sanctity of the confessional, the visibly exhausted priest can only hint to Thorn at the contents of the confession.

Soon after, the priest is murdered in the confessional by Tab Fielding, Simonson's former bodyguard. Under the direction of Governor Henry C. Santini, Thorn's superiors order him to end the investigation. Still, he continues. He soon becomes aware that a stalker is following him. As Thorn tries to control a violent mob during a Soylent Green shortage riot, he is attacked by the assassin who killed Simonson. The killer shoots three times at Thorn but misses, accidentally striking several innocent bystanders in the crowd. Thorn manages to locate the killer and throw him to the ground. The killer shoots Thorn in the leg before being crushed by the hydraulic shovel of a police riot-control vehicle, which continually scoops up shovelfuls of people in the crowd and swivels to dump them for disposal.

In researching the case for Thorn, Roth brings two volumes of the Soylent Oceanographic Survey Report, 2015–2019, taken by Thorn from Simonson's apartment, to the team of other "Books" (elderly former professors and retired judges now turned researchers) at the "Supreme Exchange". The "Books" quickly conclude from the oceanographic reports that the oceans are dying and cannot actually produce the plankton from which Soylent Green is allegedly made, thus revealing that the main ingredient in Soylent Green is, in fact, human bodies. This information confirms to Roth that Simonson's murder was ordered by his fellow Soylent Corporation board members, who knew Simonson was increasingly troubled by this truth and feared he might disclose it to the public.

Shaken by the truth, Roth decides to "return to the home of God" and seeks assisted suicide at a government clinic. Thorn discovers this and rushes to stop him, but he arrives too late. Before dying, Roth whispers his discovery to Thorn, who is horrified. Thorn moves to uncover proof of crimes against humanity and to bring it to the attention of the Supreme Exchange so the case can be brought to the Council of Nations to take action.

Thorn secretly boards a waste truck transporting human bodies from the euthanasia center to a waste-disposal plant, where he witnesses human corpses being processed and turned into Soylent Green. Thorn is discovered but escapes. As he returns to the Supreme Exchange, he is ambushed by Fielding and his men. Finding refuge in the church where Simonson confessed, Thorn kills his attackers but is seriously wounded in a gunfight. As paramedics tend to Thorn, he urges his commanding officer, Chief Hatcher, to spread the truth. As the movie ends, Thorn shouts to the surrounding crowd, "Soylent Green is people!"

== Cast ==
- Charlton Heston as Robert Thorn
- Leigh Taylor-Young as Shirl
- Chuck Connors as Tab Fielding
- Brock Peters as Chief Hatcher
- Paula Kelly as Martha Fielding
- Edward G. Robinson as Solomon Roth
- Stephen Young as Gilbert
- Joseph Cotten as William R. Simonson
- Mike Henry as Kulozik
- Lincoln Kilpatrick as The Priest
- Roy Jenson as Donovan
- Leonard Stone as Charles
- Whit Bissell as Governor Henry C. Santini
- Jane Dulo as Mrs. Santini
- Celia Lovsky as the Exchange Leader
- Dick Van Patten as Euthanasia Center Usher #1

== Production ==
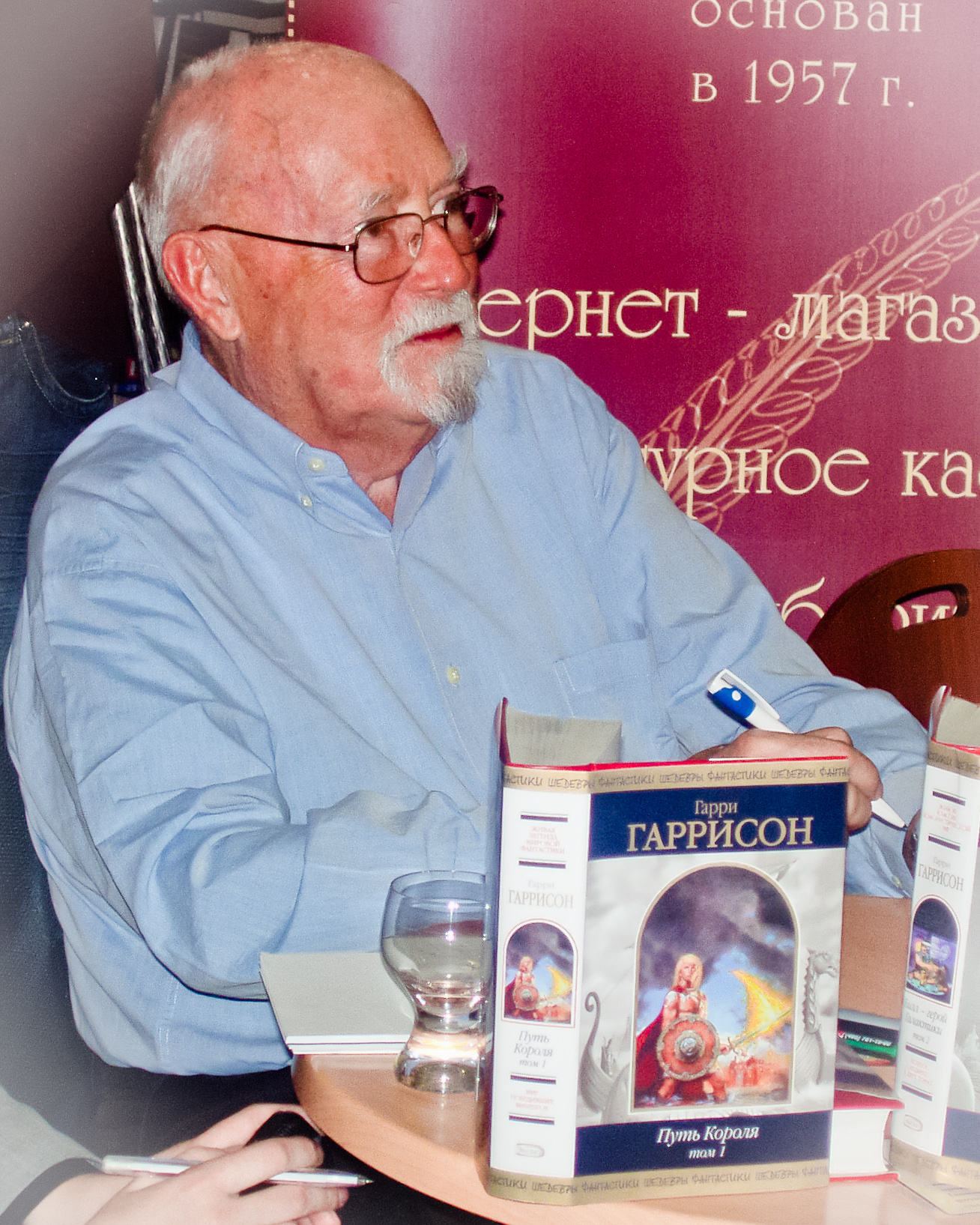
Harry Harrison, whose 1966 novel Make Room! Make Room! was adapted into Soylent Green, had no creative control over the film and was of mixed opinion on the final product.

The screenplay was based on Harry Harrison's novel Make Room! Make Room! (1966), which was set in the year 1999 with the theme of overpopulation and overuse of resources leading to increasing poverty, food shortages, and social disorder. Harrison was contractually denied control over the screenplay and was not told during negotiations that Metro-Goldwyn-Mayer was buying the film rights. He discussed the adaptation in Omni's Screen Flights/Screen Fantasies (1984), noting the "murder and chase sequences [and] the 'furniture' girls are not what the film is about – and are completely irrelevant" and answered his own question, "Am I pleased with the film? I would say 50 percent."

While the book refers to "soylent steaks" (made from soy and lentil), it makes no reference to "Soylent Green", the processed food rations depicted in the film. The book's title was not used for the movie on grounds that it might have confused audiences into thinking it was a big-screen version of Make Room for Daddy.

This was the 101st and final film in which Edward G. Robinson appeared; he died of bladder cancer on January 26, 1973, two months after the completion of filming. In his book The Actor's Life: Journal 1956–1976, Charlton Heston wrote, "He knew while we were shooting, though we did not, that he was terminally ill. He never missed an hour of work, nor was late to a call. He never was less than the consummate professional he had been all his life. I'm still haunted, though, by the knowledge that the very last scene he played in the picture, which he knew was the last day's acting he would ever do, was his death scene. I know why I was so overwhelmingly moved playing it with him." Robinson had previously worked with Heston in The Ten Commandments (1956) and the make-up tests for Planet of the Apes (1968).

The film's opening sequence, depicting America becoming more crowded with a series of archive photographs set to music, was created by filmmaker Charles Braverman. The "going home" score in Solomon Roth (Robinson)'s death scene was conducted by Gerald Fried and consists of the main themes from Symphony No. 6 ("Pathétique") by Pyotr Ilyich Tchaikovsky, Symphony No. 6 ("Pastoral") by Ludwig van Beethoven and Peer Gynt ("Morning Mood" and "Åse's Death") by Edvard Grieg. A custom cabinet unit of the early arcade game Computer Space was used in Soylent Green and is considered the first appearance of a video game in a film.

== Critical response ==
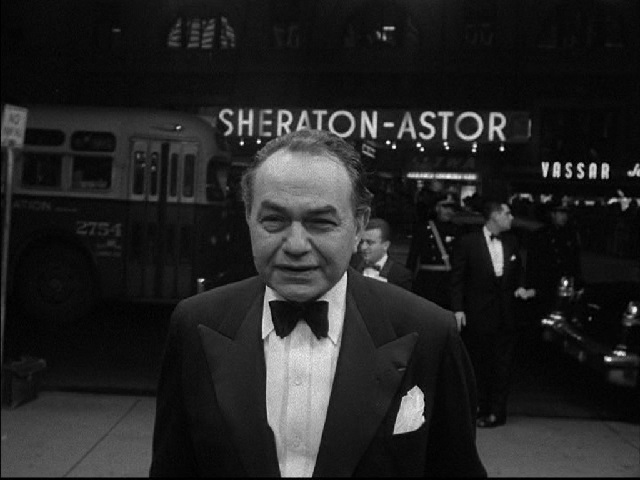
Edward G. Robinson was praised by critics for his performance in Soylent Green, which he completed filming 84 days before his death.

The film was released on April 19, 1973, and met with mixed reactions from critics. Time called it "intermittently interesting", noting that "Heston forsak[es] his granite stoicism for once" and asserting the film "will be most remembered for the last appearance of Edward G. Robinson.... In a rueful irony, his death scene, in which he is hygienically dispatched with the help of piped-in light classical music and movies of rich fields flashed before him on a towering screen, is the best in the film." New York Times critic A. H. Weiler wrote, "Soylent Green projects essentially simple, muscular melodrama a good deal more effectively than it does the potential of man's seemingly witless destruction of the Earth's resources"; Weiler concludes "Richard Fleischer's direction stresses action, not nuances of meaning or characterization. Mr. Robinson is pitiably natural as the realistic, sensitive oldster facing the futility of living in dying surroundings. But Mr. Heston is simply a rough cop chasing standard bad guys. Their 21st-century New York occasionally is frightening but it is rarely convincingly real."

Roger Ebert gave the film three stars out of four, calling it "a good, solid science-fiction movie, and a little more". Gene Siskel gave the film one-and-a-half stars out of four and called it "a silly detective yarn, full of juvenile Hollywood images. Wait 'til you see the giant snow shovel scoop the police use to round up rowdies. You may never stop laughing." Arthur D. Murphy of Variety wrote, "The somewhat plausible and proximate horrors in the story of Soylent Green carry the Russell Thacher-Walter Seltzer production over its awkward spots to the status of a good futuristic exploitation film." Charles Champlin of the Los Angeles Times called it "a clever, rough, modestly budgeted but imaginative work". Penelope Gilliatt of The New Yorker was negative, writing, "This pompously prophetic thing of a film hasn't a brain in its beanbag. Where is democracy? Where is the popular vote? Where is women's lib? Where are the uprising poor, who would have suspected what was happening in a moment?"

On Rotten Tomatoes, the film has an approval rating of 76%, based on 42 reviews, with an average rating of 6.6/10. The site's consensus states: "While admittedly melodramatic and uneven in spots, Soylent Green ultimately succeeds with its dark, plausible vision of a dystopian future."

== Awards and honors ==
- Winner Best Science Fiction Film of Year – Saturn Award, Academy of Science Fiction, Fantasy and Horror Films (Richard Fleischer, Walter Seltzer, Russell Thacher)
- Winner Grand Prize – Avoriaz International Fantastic Film Festival (Richard Fleischer)
- Nominee Best Film of Year (Best Dramatic Presentation) – Hugo Award (Richard Fleischer, Stanley Greenberg, Harry Harrison)
- Winner Best Film Script of Year (Best Dramatic Presentation) – Nebula Award, Science Fiction and Fantasy Writers of America (Stanley Greenberg, Harry Harrison)
- "Soylent Green is people!" is ranked 77th on the American Film Institute's list AFI's 100 Years...100 Movie Quotes.

== Home media ==
Soylent Green was released on Capacitance Electronic Disc by MGM/CBS Home Video and later on LaserDisc by MGM/UA in 1992 (ISBN 0-7928-1399-5, OCLC 31684584). In 2003, the film was released on DVD by Warner Home Video, and again in November 2007 to coincide with the DVD releases of two other science fiction films: Logan's Run (1976), a film that covers similar themes of dystopia and overpopulation, and Outland (1981). A Blu-ray release followed on March 29, 2011. The film was released on 4K Ultra HD Blu-Ray on July 27, 2026 in the UK and July 28, 2026 in the US by Arrow Films.

== See also ==
- Cannibalism in popular culture
- Cloud Atlas, a 2012 film based on a novel by David Mitchell
- Judge Dredd – in Mega-City One, the deceased are recycled into food after their funeral
- Logan's Run, a 1976 dystopian movie
- Oddworld: Abe's Oddysee, a 1997 dystopian science fiction video game
- Soylent (meal replacement), a brand of meal replacement products
- Tender Is the Flesh, a 2017 dystopian novel by Agustina Bazterrica
- The Wanting Seed (1962) by Anthony Burgess, in which overpopulation leads to cannibalism
