= The Weirdo =

- Directed by: Andy Milligan
- Written by: Andy Milligan
- Produced by: Kenneth Haker; Neva Friedenn
- Starring: Jessica Straus; Naomi Sherwood; Steve Burington
- Cinematography: Andy Milligan
- Edited by: Andy Milligan; Scott Means
- Music by: Jeff Peters; Michael Meros
- Production companies: Green Tiger Pictures Inc.; Rapid Film Group
- Distributed by: Radeon Video; Unifilm International Company
- Release date: January 1, 1989 (U.S.)
- Country: United States
- Language: English
- Budget: $50,000

The Weirdo is a 1989 horror film directed, written, and filmed by Andy Milligan. The film follows Donnie (Burington), who lives with his caretaker, Miss Martins (Sherwood), and Jenny (Straus) as they try to find peace while persecuted by bullies in their hometown. The film was released theatrically by Unifilm International Company and on VHS by Radeon Video on January 1, 1989.

== Plot ==
Donnie exists as the archetypal weirdo of his hometown, persecuted by bullies, and friend to none his age. He meets a girl named Jenny, who seems just as much an outcast as him. This reinvigorates him, and he hopes to start a new life of being accepted.

His confidence increases, but the world is out to punish him. The bullies manipulate and torment him, Miss Martins forbids him from seeing Jenny, and the people at the church condemn Jenny and him for their relationship. Furthermore, Donnie's mother, after putting him through years of abuse, has now resolved to sell him off to the highest bidder. Overwhelmed by all of this, Donnie suddenly kills his mother.

Then, he has to kill the person to which she was trying to sell him, who was now a witness. When he tries to run away with Jenny, Miss Martins lashes out, and the people at the church try their best to stop him. He kills all of them as well, though Miss Martins's death was arguably accidental. The town turns on him, and he pushes Jenny away to save her. At the end, the townspeople supposedly beat Donnie to death.

However, after Jenny sees his body on the ground, she looks again, and he's mysteriously disappeared.

== Production ==
Milligan uses his films to critique the concept of the typical heterosexual couple, which is apparent in the flaws associated with Jenny and Donnie in this film. It has been reported that Milligan was actually degrading to Burington on set.

== Reception ==
Lor of Variety found the film to be "an okay psychological thriller" in which the director, a "goremeister", was in a "relatively restrained mood". The reviewer criticized the film for having a "convoluted exploited genre plot" and for having "poor makeup effects" on a character's severed head. The New York Daily News called the film a "Milligan mess" that has "tilted camera angles and inspired non-sequitur dialogue". Psychotronic Video said, "this talky west coast movie tries to be artistic (lots of blackouts), sensitive, and sensational". Video Watchdog's Tim Lucas reviewed the film. In a negative review, Dan Persons of Cinefantastique called the film "mind-boggling cinematic ineptitude" that has awful cinematography and poor acting where a performer does not remember to maintain her "club-footed limp".
