= The Secret of Santa Vittoria =

1969 film by Stanley Kramer

- Theatrical release poster by Bob Peak
- Directed by: Stanley Kramer
- Screenplay by: William Rose
- Story by: Ben Maddow
- Based on: The Secret of Santa Vittoria; 1966 novel by Robert Crichton
- Produced by: Stanley Kramer; Associate producer George Glass
- Starring: Anthony Quinn; Virna Lisi; Hardy Krüger; Sergio Franchi; Anna Magnani; Renato Rascel; Giancarlo Giannini; Patrizia Valturri; Eduardo Ciannelli; Leopoldo Trieste; Quinto Parmeggiani
- Cinematography: Giuseppe Rotunno, A.S.C.
- Edited by: William A. Lyon, A.C.E. and Earle Herdan
- Music by: Ernest Gold
- Production company: The Stanley Kramer Corporation
- Distributed by: United Artists
- Release date: October 17, 1969
- Running time: 139 minutes
- Country: United States
- Language: English
- Budget: $6.3 million
- Box office: $6.5 million (rentals)

The Secret of Santa Vittoria is a 1969 American war film distributed by United Artists. It was produced and directed by Stanley Kramer and co-produced by George Glass from a screenplay by Ben Maddow and William Rose. It was based on the best-selling 1966 novel by Robert Crichton. The music score was by Ernest Gold and the cinematography by Giuseppe Rotunno.

The film stars Anthony Quinn, Anna Magnani, Virna Lisi, Hardy Krüger, and Sergio Franchi. It also features Renato Rascel, Giancarlo Giannini, and Eduardo Ciannelli; with Valentina Cortese making an uncredited appearance. It was shot almost entirely on location in Anticoli Corrado, Italy (near Rome).

== Plot ==
The story is set during World War II in the summer of 1943, immediately after the fall of Italy's Fascist government under Benito Mussolini, when the German army moved to occupy most of the country. The only substantial source of income for the little hill town of Santa Vittoria is its wine. The townsfolk learn that the German occupation forces will be arriving soon, with plans to confiscate most of Santa Vittoria's wine and transport it to Germany. The people organize under the inspiration of their new mayor, Italo Bombolini (Anthony Quinn), who until days before had been thought of as a buffoon by everyone in town including his wife (Anna Magnani), and had only been appointed mayor by the town's pro-Mussolini politicians as a ruse to deflect the people's anger. With everyone working together, the villagers are able to hide a million bottles of wine by sealing them in the galleries of an ancient Roman cave before the arrival of a German army detachment under the command of Captain Sepp Von Prum (Hardy Krüger).

The Germans, when they arrive, plan to confiscate 80% of the 317,601 bottles of wine the villagers had left for them to find. However, the Germans discover accounting records of five times as many bottles. Von Prum comes to suspect the rest is hidden in or near Santa Vittoria. He and Bombolini, two very different men, engage in a battle of wits in the days that follow. The Germans' search is made complicated when Von Prum becomes infatuated with Caterina Malatesta (Virna Lisi), an educated and elegant woman unlike any other in town. She is secretly sheltering and has fallen in love with Carlo Tufa (Sergio Franchi), a wounded captain in the Royal Italian Army, who, as it happens, has provided much of the brainpower for the town's so far successful wine-hiding plans.

Von Prum orders every building and home and the surrounding area searched. His men find no wine, but they discover Tufa hiding in Caterina's home. Later Von Prum, who by now is absolutely certain the village is indeed hiding one million bottles of wine from him, orders several villagers to be tortured into revealing their location. However, the villagers cunningly arrange for the Germans to select the pro-Mussolini politicians to be tortured, who because they had been arrested shortly after Bombolini had become mayor, genuinely do not know anything about any hidden wine.

Finally, with time running out before the Germans must withdraw north toward the Gustav Line, a frustrated Von Prum threatens to shoot mayor Bombolini in front of the assembled townspeople unless the hidden wine's location is told. No one speaks up. Not being a Nazi fanatic, and perhaps also because he had been somewhat appeased by Caterina having spent the previous night with him, which she did to save Tufa from being executed for desertion, Von Prum silently accepts defeat and leaves the town without harming the mayor. After the Germans leave Santa Vittoria, the townspeople, led by Bombolini, celebrate their victory by dancing in the streets.

== Cast ==
- Anthony Quinn as Italo Bombolini
- Virna Lisi as Caterina Malatesta
- Hardy Krüger as Sepp Von Prum
- Sergio Franchi as Carlo Tufa
- Anna Magnani as Rosa Bombolini
- Renato Rascel as Babbaluche
- Giancarlo Giannini as Fabio de la Romagna
- Patrizia Valturri as Angela Bombolini
- Eduardo Ciannelli as Luigi
- Leopoldo Trieste as Vittorini
- Gigi Ballista as Padre Polenta
- Quinto Parmeggiani as Cop

== Production ==
Ben Maddow, who worked on the script, called the film "terrible. The script had already been written and [co-screenwriter] William Rose did not want to bother making any changes, so I was just along for the ride."

== Release ==
The world premiere was held in Westwood, Los Angeles on October 17, 1969 to benefit the Reiss-Davis Child Study Center, with Gregory Peck as chairman.

It was selected as the opening-night film for the 13th Annual San Francisco International Film Festival.

== Reception ==
Film critic Vincent Canby included the movie in his list for The New York Times as among the worst films of 1969, stating, "Kramer's manner of adapting a small, comic novel is to turn the project into a sort of bucolic 'War and Peace.' Rent several Italian towns. Hire a large proportion of the members of the Italian film industry…. And, just to make sure that everyone understands that the whole thing is supposed to be fake, hire Anthony Quinn to impersonate Anthony Quinn as a big, loud, slovely boob. When you've done all that, turn on the cameras and point them at your employees."

The film earned theatrical rentals of $2.7 million in the United States and Canada and $6.5 million worldwide, which was considered a disappointment considering the popularity of the novel.

On review aggregator website Rotten Tomatoes, the film holds an approval rating of 75% based on 12 reviews, with an average rating of 6.5/10.

== Awards and nominations ==
The film was nominated for two Academy Awards for Best Film Editing (William A. Lyon and Earle Herdan) and Best Music Score (Ernest Gold). It was nominated for an Eddie award by the American Cinema Editors for best edited feature film.

The film won the Golden Globe Award for Best Motion Picture Comedy and was nominated by the Golden Globe Awards committee for Best Director (Stanley Kramer), Best Actor Comedy (Anthony Quinn), Best Actress Comedy (Anna Magnani), Best Original Score (Ernest Gold) and Best Original Song ("Stay", Ernest Gold and Norman Gimbel)

== See also ==
- List of American films of 1969
