= The Last Hard Men (film) =

1976 film by Andrew V. McLaglen

- Theatrical release poster
- Directed by: Andrew V. McLaglen
- Written by: Guerdon Trueblood
- Based on: Gundown; 1969 novel by Brian Garfield
- Produced by: Walter Seltzer; Russell Thacher
- Starring: Charlton Heston; James Coburn; Barbara Hershey; Jorge Rivero; Michael Parks; Larry Wilcox
- Cinematography: Duke Callaghan
- Edited by: Fred A. Chulack
- Music by: Jerry Goldsmith
- Distributed by: 20th Century Fox
- Release date: June 1, 1976
- Running time: 98 minutes
- Country: United States
- Language: English

The Last Hard Men is a 1976 American Western film directed by Andrew McLaglen, based on the 1969 novel Gundown by Brian Garfield. It stars Charlton Heston and James Coburn, with supporting roles by Barbara Hershey, Jorge Rivero, Michael Parks, and Larry Wilcox in his screen debut.

== Plot ==
In 1909 Arizona Territory (not yet the 48th state until three years later with neighboring New Mexico Territory in 1912), Captain Sam Burgade has retired from his law enforcement career with the state policing agency, the Arizona Rangers. Hoping for peace and quiet, he suddenly learns that his old criminal enemy, Zach Provo, has escaped from a Yuma Territorial Prison chain gang on a desert railway line with other convicts. Zach Provo is a half-Indian outlaw who dreams of exacting revenge on Burgade, not only for putting him away but for the death of his Indian wife who was killed in a crossfire years before. Burgade was shot by Provo and barely survived, but he later sent Provo to prison. Burgade understands that Provo wants revenge, so he puts himself out front of a squad guarding a gold shipment. But Provo does not fall for the trap as Burgade expects. Instead, Provo kidnaps Burgade's daughter, Susan, while Burgade is away from home with the gold shipment.

Now begins Burgade's pursuit of Provo into an Indian reservation, at first with a posse and later accompanied only by Susan's fiancé, Hal Brickman. The six remaining men of 22 escaped prisoners form an ambush. Provo allows two of them to rape Susan in full view of Burgade and Brickman, to bait Burgade to show himself in an attempt to rescue her. To prevent him from doing so, which would mean certain death, Brickman knocks Burgade unconscious.

With Susan still alive, Burgade and Brickman light a fire to burn out the fugitives. In the commotion, Burgade and Brickman manage to dispose of them one by one until only Provo is left. But Burgade suddenly finds himself at gunpoint and then is shot by Provo several times. Provo is about to cut out Burgade's heart with a knife when Burgaded manages, at last, to shoot Provo through the chest with a handgun. The film ends with Susan and Brickman tending to Burgade's severe injuries.

== Cast ==
- Charlton Heston as Sam Burgade
- James Coburn as Zach Provo
- Barbara Hershey as Susan Burgade
- Jorge Rivero as Cesar Menendez
- Michael Parks as Sheriff Noel Nye
- Larry Wilcox as Mike Shelby
- Thalmus Rasulala as George Weed
- Morgan Paull as Portugee Shiraz
- John Quade as Will Gant
- Robert Donner as Lee Roy Tucker
- Christopher Mitchum as Hal Brickman
- Riley Hill as Gus Stanton

== Production ==
Heston made the film after having turned down the lead in The Omen. He wanted Sean Connery to play the co-lead but went with James Coburn. The script was rewritten by John Gay.

The film was made when James Coburn was shifting from leads to support parts. Coburn recalled, "It was very hard to justify my character’s vendetta with Charlton Heston. He had no redeeming qualities. He was just out for revenge. The director was Andrew V. McLaglen. He knows how to go out, shoot a film and get it done. That’s about all. He’s another director for hire.”

Filming started late October 1975 in Arizona. On December 2 Heston wrote in his journal:

Jimmy Coburn is not a fast actor, which is OK; fast acting is no great virtue. On the other hand, slow acting isn’t either. He likes to discuss, to have things explained and argued through. This is fine, too, but it can be an indulgence. To want to change and improve the scenes is, God knows, something I understand, but you have to know what you want. If you don’t, and often Jimmy doesn’t, then you have to do it. His questions are better than his answers. Still, he’s very good in the part. He’s made a brave choice to use none of the smiling charm he’s used so effectively in other roles.

Filming ended by mid December. On January 14 Heston saw a rough cut and wrote the film "on first look, seems OK, but not fantastic. I like what I do pretty much and what Coburn does very much. It needs a lot of looping, some sharpening."

On April 9 he wrote about seeing a screening of the film the previous night. "It seemed good to me, even with some cuts I’d opposed, but I thought the (invited) audience response was muted, and courteous."

== Reception ==
=== Critical response ===
New York Times film critic, Richard Eder gave the film a mostly positive review, writing:

The Last Hard Men is not just a horse opera; it's practically Tristan and Isolde. Only the love-death relation isn't between a man and a woman but between a retired lawman and a half-breed Navajo who is obsessed with the notion of killing him ... Some of the chases are well done, particularly a night scene when the daughter tries to escape the bandits and is hauled back. I liked the dry performance of Michael Parks as the young sheriff who has more faith in his telephone than in old-fashioned shoot-outs.

Variety magazine said of the film:

The Last Hard Men is a fairly good actioner with handsome production values and some thoughtful overtones...The details of life at a crucial transition point in American history are well captured in the script and in the art direction.

TV Guide magazine wrote:

The story is a rough and realistic portrait of the final days of a Wild West being subdued by civilization. Heston is an archaic type of hero, but his approach is the only one that can meet Coburn's. The cast gives believable and realistic performances, with script and direction contributing a sleekness.

== Notes ==
- Heston, Charlton (1979). The actor's life : journals, 1956–1976. Pocket Books.
