= Timothy of the Cay =

1993 book by Theodore Taylor

- Author: Theodore Taylor
- Language: English
- Genre: Historical fiction
- Publication date: 1993
- Publication place: United States
- Media type: Print (Hardback & Paperback)
- ISBN: 978-0-152-06320-7
- OCLC: 28422724
- Preceded by: The Cay

Timothy of the Cay is a book written by Theodore Taylor. It is a prequel for Timothy and a sequel for Phillip to the 1969 novel The Cay.

== Synopsis ==
The book discusses Timothy's life before the events of The Cay, when he was living in "Back O' All," the poorest section of what was then the squatter's village of Charlotte Amalie, on the then Danish-held United States Virgin Island of St. Thomas (of which Virgin Island it is now the capital), and Phillip Enright's life after the same events. The theme to this story is making dreams a reality.

=== Timothy ===
According to Timothy of the Cay, Timothy had been abandoned as a baby at the residence in Back O' All where Hannah Gumbs, a former coal carrier turned washer-woman who reared him, was a squatter. As a boy, he formed a dream of one day being captain of his own schooner, which he meant to name after the woman he called "Tante Hannah." Even though she was not Timothy's biological aunt, Timothy still referred to her as this. When he tried to become a cabin boy on one ship, its captain took on a "bukra" boy instead because he was a negro (black person). A "bukra" was a white boy in the richer part of St. Thomas. When he finally got a job on another ship, the Gertrude Theismann, he believed he was only fourteen, but he claimed an age of sixteen. He later claimed to be sixty, younger than the more than seventy years of age he guesstimated he actually was, so he could become part of the crew on the Hato.

Hannah Gumbs died during the second of Timothy's first four years at sea. Timothy came back home with clothes for her only to find that she was dead. Timothy worked long enough and hard enough, both at sea and on land, to be able to afford a schooner originally named the Tessie Crabb by what he guesstimated were his forties. Holding a master's license in the name of "Timothy Gumbs" (he would think of himself simply as Timothy, without a family name, for his entire life) by this time, he renamed this schooner the Hannah Gumbs, as he had always intended. Making his living as its "captain," Timothy gleaned an extensive enough knowledge of the sea to be able, in his last months, to help Phillip Enright survive on a cay in La Boca del Diablo, "the Devil's Mouth."

The story describes how, after the captain of the Hettie Redd died, Timothy was asked to bring his body back for burial as temporary captain of the Hettie Redd. He did so reluctantly, suspecting that a violent storm, or "tempis'," might strike. And one did, sinking the Hettie Redd with all hands let alone him and drowning all its passengers in spite of all he did to ensure their survivals. Though he was absolved in the inquiry, Timothy carried the guilt for the rest of his days and often wished that he too had drowned in the storm.

At over seventy years of age, and two years after he had sold the Hannah Gumbs and retired from the sea, Timothy signed aboard the S.S. Hato, the Dutch-registered freighter that, according to The Cay, was sunk on April 9, 1942, as an able-bodied seaman, in response to a call for volunteers that had been placed early in 1942. The cause was that of a German U-boat that had torpedoed the S.S. Hato. When it picked up Phillip Enright and his mother in Curaçao, of what were then the Netherlands Antilles, they were fleeing to their native Virginia. Instead the Hato was torpedoed; as it sank, Phillip was struck on the back of the head by a piece of loose timber just as he was being thrown aboard a raft, which blinded him two days later. Most of the events in The Cay follow the sinking of the Hato. Timothy later taught Phillip Enright to survive on his own. Approximately three months after the Hato's shipwreck, give or take a few days, another "tempis'" struck in July. Timothy let Phillip live by shielding him from the storm with his back. The wind and the flying debris from the storm eventually beat and killed Timothy. Before his death, he had provided Phillip with enough preparation to survive alone, which Phillip did for almost two months after Timothy's death due to him shielding Phillip from the "tempis".

=== Phillip Enright ===
After his rescue from the Cay in La Boca del Diablo, Phillip was reunited with his parents. (His mother had likewise survived the sinking of the Hato.) His mother, Grace Enright, continued to think of him as a child of age 10 for a long while, even after he was told that an operation could be performed that might restore his vision, but her husband, Phillip Enright Sr, endorsed their son's decision to have that surgery. Phillip had come, since Timothy's life, to consider Timothy a guardian angel with whom he could sometimes speak, but his mother thought this idea was foolish.

They flew to New York, where the surgeon from New York Presbyterian who could perform the operation was based. The operation was a success, restoring most of Phillip's vision, though he would always need eyeglasses from that day forward. He and his father made plans to visit the cay where he and Timothy had survived for just over three months.

Phillip eventually sails to make this journey, ultimately being able to find it thanks to closing his eyes and remembering the island when he was blind.

== Reception ==
This book was named "one of the greatest books for children" by Students Across America (SAA) in 2011. They said of it: "This novel is about the life of Timothy and Philip before their ordeal on the cay. In order to make sense of this story you must first read The Cay."
