= Walter Seltzer =

American film producer

- Born: November 7, 1914; Philadelphia, Pennsylvania, U.S.
- Died: February 18, 2011 (aged 96); Woodland Hills, California, U.S.
- Occupation: Film producer
- Years active: 1959–1976

Walter Seltzer (November 7, 1914 – February 18, 2011) was an American film producer. He sat on the Motion Picture & Television Fund Board of Trustees, and was honored with the Silver Medallion for Humanitarian Achievement by the group in 1986.

== Biography ==
Seltzer was born to a Jewish family in Philadelphia, Pennsylvania and attended the University of Pennsylvania from 1932 to 1934. He had two brothers: Frank N. Seltzer, a producer; and Julian Seltzer, an advertising director for Hal Roach Studios and later 20th Century Fox. Seltzer served four years in the U.S. Marine Corps during World War II.

== Filmography ==
He was a producer in all films unless otherwise noted.

=== Film ===
Year	Film	Credit	Notes
1956	The Boss	Associate producer	
1959	Shake Hands with the Devil	Executive producer	
1961	One-Eyed Jacks	Executive producer	
1961	The Naked Edge		
1961	Paris Blues	Executive producer	
1964	Man in the Middle		
1965	Wild Seed	Executive producer	
1965	The War Lord		
1966	Beau Geste		
1967	Will Penny		
1969	Number One		
1970	Darker than Amber		
1971	The Omega Man		
1972	Skyjacked		
1973	Soylent Green		
1976	The Last Hard Men		Final film as a producer

=== Television ===
Year	Title	Notes
1974	The Cay	Television film

== Death ==
He died at the Motion Picture and Television Fund home in Woodland Hills, California on February 18, 2011, aged 96, from pneumonia.
