= Pluk =

Pluk may refer to:

- Pluk van de Petteflet, a 1971 children's book by Dutch writer Annie M.G. Schmidt
- Little Orbit the Astrodog and the Screechers from Outer Space (Pluk, naufragé de l'espace), a 1979 French animated film directed by Jean Image
