= The Flying Liftboy =

1998 Dutch adventure film

- Theatrical release poster
- Directed by: Ben Sombogaart
- Screenplay by: Burny Bos
- Based on: Abeltje by Annie M.G. Schmidt
- Produced by: Burny Bos
- Starring: Ricky van Gastel; Soraya Smith; Frits Lambrechts; Marisa van Eyle; Annet Malherbe
- Cinematography: Reinier van Brummelen
- Edited by: Herman P. Koerts
- Music by: Henny Vrienten
- Production companies: Bos Bros. Film-TV Productions; Delux Productions; AVRO
- Distributed by: Warner Bros.
- Release dates: 23 November 1998 (Tuschinski Theatre); 26 November 1998 (Netherlands)
- Running time: 110 minutes
- Country: Netherlands
- Languages: Dutch; English; Spanish; German
- Budget: ƒ9.2 million

The Flying Liftboy (Dutch: Abeltje), also known as Abel, the Flying Liftboy is a 1998 Dutch family adventure film directed by Ben Sombogaart and written and produced by Burny Bos, based on the 1953 Dutch children's book Abeltje by Annie M.G. Schmidt. It stars Ricky van Gastel, Soraya Smith, Frits Lambrechts, Marisa van Eyle and Annet Malherbe. It is the first feature film to be adapted from Schmidt's books.

Bos first acquired the rights to adapt Schmidt's works in 1990 before development of the film began in 1994. However, various issues such as the budget delayed production of the film. It was filmed in the Netherlands, Luxembourg, Spain and New York.

The film was released on 26 November 1998 in the Netherlands by Warner Bros. under their Family Entertainment label. The film received mixed reviews, but it became a major success in the country. It won the Golden Calf for Best Feature Film. The film was later re-edited into a seven-episode miniseries for television by AVRO in 2000.

== Plot ==
After a humiliating incident involving his girlfriend Laura, Mother Roef takes her son Abeltje away from school and gets him a job as a lift boy at department store KNOTS. After a tour of the job, his manager Schraap tells him not to push the green button under any circumstances, under pressure, Abeltje pushes the green button and the lift takes off. This to the horror of Roef, the management, and the other inhabitants of the lift, Soon after the lift flies out of the department store, Abeltje finds out how to steer the lift.

His traveling companions - Laura, mothball salesman Jozias Tump, and singing teacher Miss Klaterhoen - are also embroiled in his adventure. Abeltje manages to land the lift on a New York parking lot. There Abeltje sets off to look for work. Millionaire Mrs. Cockle-Smith thinks he is her long-lost son Johnny and kidnaps him.

Locked up in the luxury penthouse of his 'second' mother, Abeltje finds out that he does bear an uncanny resemblance to Johnny, this makes his next destination clear: he wants to find Johnny. Mr Tump helps Abeltje to escape and immediately after they reach the lift they set off at top speed for Perugona in South America, the spot where Johnny disappeared.

In Perugona, their visit happens to coincide with a coup. they end up in the hands of the guerrillas who appoint the vain Mr Tump as president. Everyone knows that Tump is only a puppet, Mr Tump himself is convinced that this career leap is a justified confirmation of his personality. Mr Tump's position makes it possible for Abeltje to set off with Laura in search of Johnny. In The Netherlands and New York, it has become clear that the lift and its inhabitants are in Perugona and the mothers of Abeltje and Johnny set off to look for their offspring. The exciting hunt for Abeltje has started. The hunt gets even more exciting when Abeltje does indeed manage to find Johnny.

Roef arrives in Perugona and accidentally takes Johnny back in her plane and sets off to The Netherlands. When Mr Tump is then deposed, it's high time for the lift travellers to set off for the safety of their own home. But then in front of the eyes of Mother Roef, Mrs. Cockle Smith and the guerrillas the lift disappears into the volcano Quoquapepapetl. During the memorial service in the department store, the lift pops up in the elevator shaft and everyone is reunited.

== Cast ==
- Ricky van Gastel as Abeltje Roef / Johnny Cockle Smith
- Soraya Smith as Laura
- Frits Lambrechts as Jozias Tump
- Marisa van Eyle as Miss Klaterhoen
- Annet Malherbe as Mother Roef / Mrs. Cockle-Smith
- Victor Löw as Schraap
- Kees Hulst as Schoolmaster
- Nora Kretz as Sofie Tump
- Roxanne Stam as a friend of Laura
- Afroditi-Piteni Bijker as a friend of Laura
- Leslie de Gruyter as Mr. Cockle-Smith
- Arnita Swanson as TV presenter
- Philip van Lidth de Jeude as Generallissimo
- Herman Koch as Mr Tump's Interpreter
- Carine Crutzen as Guerrillabaas
- Henny Vrienten as Organist / Spanish singer

== Production ==
=== Development ===
Olivier Tuinier, who starred in Sombogaart's The Pocket-knife was originally cast as Abeltje Roef, but following production delays, he grew out of the role and was replaced with Ricky van Gastel.

During filming, Burny Bos was in negotiations with PolyGram Filmed Entertainment, Buena Vista International and Warner Bros. over the distribution rights for the Benelux. Warner Bros. eventually acquired the rights of the film on 24 November 1997.

=== Filming ===
Principal photography took place in the Noordoostpolder, Hilversum, Luxembourg, Seville and New York.

=== Effects ===
Lukkien Digital Film Facilities provided the effects for the film.

=== Music ===
Henny Vrienten composed the score for the film. Trijntje Oosterhuis wrote the song Vlieg met me mee (het avontuur) for the film.

== Soundtrack ==
No.	Title	Performer(s)	Length
1.	"Vlieg Met Me Mee (Het Avontuur)"	Trijntje Oosterhuis	3:57
2.	"Flying"	Roméo feat. Rose Royce's Gwen Dickey	4:36
3.	"I Wanna Be With You"	Backstreet Boys	4:03
4.	"Satisfied"	Five	4:11
5.	"New York"	Trijntje Oosterhuis	2:45
6.	"Big Beat Boy"	WOW!	3:59
7.	"Turn Back Time"	Aqua	4:03
8.	"Walk Away"	Solid HarmoniE	4:22
9.	"Twips"	Juffrouw Klaterhoen	3:08
10.	"Generation X-mas"	Bolland & Bolland	5:20
11.	"Here 'n Now"	Total Touch	4:47
12.	"Sailing"	*NSYNC	4:35
13.	"Perugona"	Fernando Lameirinhas	2:58
14.	"Generalissimo"	The Gibson Brothers	5:20
15.	"To Brazil"	Vengaboys	3:06
16.	"Neem Me Mee"	Volumia!	4:11
17.	"Salsa De Maria"	The Gibson Brothers	3:25
18.	"Smoorverliefd"	Juffrouw Klaterhoen	2:37
19.	"Follow The Sun"	Santa Esmeralda's Leroy Gomez	4:20
20.	"On Wings Of Love"	Roméo feat. Rose Royce's Gwen Dickey	4:11
Total length:			01:18:42

== Release ==
=== Critical response ===
The Flying Liftboy received mixed to positive reviews from critics. Dana Linssen of NRC Handelsblad wrote a positive review and states that the film "offers great entertainment for Schmidt purists" and that "every joke and every storyline is catchy on several levels, including the art direction full of searching pictures and unexpected discoveries." She concluded her review saying that the film "is more intelligent and witty than many of its American counterparts and the film should definitely be able to win the race with the traditional Christmas Disney releases."

=== Home media ===
The film was released on VHS and DVD by Warner Home Video on 19 May 1999. The DVD release is presented in a 1.33:1 format, while the bonus materials included on the disc are three music videos from the film. It was later re-issued on 25 April 2007 as part of De Annie M.G. Schmidt Collectie 2 DVD set that includes Miss Minoes and Otje.

== Accolades ==
Accolades received by The Flying Liftboy
Year	Award	Category	Recipient(s)	Result	Ref.
1999	Netherlands Film Festival	Golden Calf for Best Feature Film	Burny Bos	Won	
1999	Netherlands Film Festival	Golden Calf for Best Actress	Annet Malherbe	Nominated	

== See also ==
- Cinema of the Netherlands
