= Tow Truck Pluck =

2004 Dutch comedy musical family film

- Theatrical release poster
- Directed by: Ben Sombogaart; Pieter van Rijn
- Screenplay by: Tamara Bos
- Based on: Pluk van de Petteflet by Annie M.G. Schmidt
- Produced by: Burny Bos; Michiel de Rooij; Sabine Veenendaal
- Starring: Janieck van de Polder; Suzanne Zuiderwijk; Hanneke Riemer; Arjan Ederveen; Jack Wouterse; Erik van Muiswinkel; Erica Terpstra
- Cinematography: Remko Schnorr
- Edited by: Herman P. Koerts
- Music by: Fons Merkies
- Production companies: Bos Bros. Film-TV Productions; AVRO
- Distributed by: Warner Bros. Pictures
- Release dates: 16 November 2004 (Amsterdam); 17 November 2004 (Netherlands)
- Running time: 94 minutes
- Country: Netherlands
- Language: Dutch
- Budget: €3.1 million
- Box office: $3.5 million

Tow Truck Pluck (Dutch: Pluk van de Petteflet), also known as Pluk and his Tow Truck, is a 2004 Dutch comedy musical family film directed by Ben Sombogaart and Pieter van Rijn. It's an adaptation of the 1971 children's book Pluk van de Petteflet by Annie M.G. Schmidt, starring Janieck van de Polder as the titular character.

The film was released in the Netherlands on 17 November 2004 by Warner Bros. Pictures. It received a Golden Film (100,000 visitors) in 2004 and a Platinum Film (400,000 visitors) in 2005.

== Cast ==
- Janieck van de Polder as Pluk (Pluck)
- Suzanne Zuiderwijk as Aagje (Aggie)
- Hanneke Riemer as Mevrouw Helderder (Ms. Brightner)
- Arjan Ederveen as Meneer Pen & Kluizelaar (Mr Penn & Hermite)
- Jack Wouterse as Vader Stamper (Father Stamper)
- Erik van Muiswinkel as Majoor (Major)
- Chris Bolczek as Portier
- Paul Hoes as Parkarchitect (Park architect)
- Erica Terpstra as Burgemeester (Mayor)
- Stefan de Walle as Dokter (Doctor)
- Martine Sandifort as Dollie (Dolly, voice)
- John Buijsman as Karel (Charlie, voice)
- Owen Schumacher as Zaza (voice)
- Frits Lambrechts as Heen-en-Weerwolf (Tell-me-where-wolf, voice)
- Karin Bloemen as Paard Langhors & Bij (Horse Longhors, voice)
- Dolf Jansen as Schuw konijn (Rabbit, voice)
- Marc-Marie Huijbregts as Lispeltuut (Tootlispe, voice)

== Production ==
The film was originally planned to be a stop-motion animated film, but was scrapped in favor of live-action with puppetry due to budget constraints.

Janieck van de Polder, Suzanne Zuiderwijk, Hanneke Riemer, Arjan Ederveen, Erik van Muiswinkel, and ex-politician Erica Terpstra were cast in March 2004. Filming took place at NOB-Studios in Almere.

== Release ==
The film held its premiere on 16 November 2004 at the Tuschinski Theatre in Amsterdam, with Queen Beatrix in attendance.

=== Video game ===
A video game tie-in developed by Ijsfontein was released in 2005 for PC and Mac. A Nintendo DS version developed by Triangle Studios was later released in 2009.

=== Critical response ===
The film received mixed reviews from critics.

=== Home media ===
The film was released on DVD by Warner Home Video on 13 May 2005. The DVD releases includes extras such as "Pluk Sjoernaals", songs from the film and various trailers.
