= Pluk van de Petteflet =

Book by Annie M.G. Schmidt

Tow-Truck Pluck
- First edition
- Author: Annie M.G. Schmidt
- Cover artist: Fiep Westendorp
- Language: Dutch
- Publisher: Querido
- Publication date: 1971
- Publication place: Netherlands
- Media type: Print
- Pages: 167
- ISBN: 978-90-214-8098-5
- OCLC: 65557528

Tow-Truck Pluck (Dutch: Pluk van de Petteflet) is a children's book by Dutch writer Annie M.G. Schmidt. First published in 1971, it remains in print and is one of the most popular Dutch books for children, and the second most popular book by Schmidt (after Jip and Janneke). A radio drama based on the book was produced in 2002, and a film adaptation in 2004; Tow Truck Pluck ranked No. 10 on the list of most popular Dutch movies between 1996 and 2005 and was awarded platinum status early in January 2005. The cover of Pluk (all drawings are by Schmidt's regular illustrator, Fiep Westendorp) is used to illustrate the article about Schmidt on the website of the "Canon of the Netherlands," and Pluk got his own stamp in 1999.

== Publication history ==
Schmidt and Westendorp began Pluk as a weekly illustrated feuilleton for Margriet, a ladies' magazine, in 1968 and 1969. They were first printed in book form in 1971, and have remained in print ever since. The 1995 printing was the 18th, and brought the total printed copies to 495,000. Indications of the book's lasting popularity are that 75,000 copies were printed in 1991, twenty years after its first publication; the 1992 printing was the third-bestselling book for children age 6–10 in the month of June, the best-selling book in that category in August, and the second-bestselling book in that category in June 1995.

Eleven unpublished chapters were found in 2001, a kind of prequel to the stories in the book. These were organized with the help of Fiep Westendorp (Schmidt had died already), and were then published as Pluk Redt de Dieren (Pluk Saves the Animals). That book was published in 2004 and sold 150,000 copies, making it the best-selling Dutch children's book of the year.

== Content ==
The book, like Schmidt's other children's novels, has a "realistic, modern setting"—Pluk drives a little truck and has a difficult time finding a place to live—but his world is full of fairy-tale creatures, such as, in this case, talking cockroaches, pigeons, and seagulls; horses of record-length; extinct fantastical birds; and a wolf who operates a ferry. In its combining reality and magic, Pluk is often mentioned alongside Roald Dahl's The BFG.

Pluk, a young red-haired boy, lives alone in a little room on the top floor of the Petteflet, an apartment building. He has no parents, but he does have a little tow truck. He quickly makes friends, such as Zaza, a cockroach, and Mr. Penn, who operates a bookstore. With the help of Dolly, a friendly pigeon, he exchanges notes and candy with the girl below, Aggie, whose mother is überclean and tries to get Pluk evicted, especially when she sees Zaza in his room (her scheme is foiled with the help of a number of seagulls). With the Stamper family (a single father and six unkempt boys) and Aggie, Pluk spends a week at the beach. The book's biggest adventure is the rescue of the park, which is to make room for developments. Pluk has to travel a great distance to get help from a mysterious hermit (who refers to himself as a hermite); the magic berries he brings back have a strange effect: the construction crew and all the other adults (including the mayor) get giddy and forget all about their task—instead, they go and play. As a final adventure, Pluk helps save a strange bird, the "krullevaar," bred from a mysterious egg he and Aggie found on their vacation at the beach.

== Educational value and reception ==
Annie M.G. Schmidt is often praised (and with her often Guus Kuijer) for bringing a new direction to Dutch children's literature. Breaking with a fairly conservative and realistic tradition of books about heroes with many conventional inner virtues, Schmidt's characters are often rebellious, and Pluk is often cited as one of those kind-hearted but serious rebels. The scene in the park, when the authority figures are all intoxicated after eating the berries Pluk has brought from the hermit, is one example of such antiestablishmentarianism. Hailed as a "modern classic," many educational books advise reading Pluk. Others suggest reading the book since it is said to teach children the value of serving others. The book is referred to in many Dutch books, fiction and non-fiction, in which parents read to their children or adults reflect on their childhood.

== Translations ==
Pluk was translated to German as Pluck mit dem Kranwagen; it is praised by German critics as a positive reading experience. Pluk has also appeared in Norwegian, in Polish and in Spanish. The Dutch publisher, Querido, published an English version, translated by David Colmer, under the title Tow-Truck Pluck in 2011. The book is so canonical that occasionally it is used in case studies in language research. According to the Annie M.G. Schmidt website, there are also translations of Pluk in Bulgarian, Danish, Estonian, Afrikaans (Wannie van die woonstel), West Frisian, and Serbo-Croatian.

== See also ==
- Tow Truck Pluck, the film adaptation
