= Netherlands in the Eurovision Song Contest 1956 =

- Eurovision Song Contest 1956
- Participating broadcaster: Nederlandse Televisie Stichting (NTS)
- Country: Netherlands
- Selection process: Het Europese Song Festival – Nationale finale
- Selection date: 24 April 1956

Competing entries

First entry
- Song: "De vogels van Holland"
- Artist: Jetty Paerl
- Songwriters: Cor Lemaire; Annie M. G. Schmidt

Second entry
- Song: "Voorgoed voorbij"
- Artist: Corry Brokken
- Songwriter: Jelle de Vries

Placement
- Final result: N/A

Participation chronology

The Netherlands was represented at the Eurovision Song Contest 1956 with two songs: "De vogels van Holland", composed by Cor Lemaire, with lyrics by Annie M. G. Schmidt, and performed by Jetty Paerl; and "Voorgoed voorbij", written by Jelle de Vries, and performed by Corry Brokken. The Dutch participating broadcaster, Nederlandse Televisie Stichting (NTS), held a national final to select its two entries in the contest. "De vogels van Holland" was the first entry performed in the Eurovision Song Contest, so it was also the first entry from the Netherlands and the first entry in Dutch in the contest.

== Before Eurovision ==
For its national selection, Nederlandse Televisie Stichting (NTS) invited a number of songwriters to send in entries. From the submitted entries, a jury consisting of Hugo de Groot, Harm Smedes and Max Dendermonde, chose eight songs for the national final. Corry Brokken, Jetty Paerl, and Bert Visser were chosen separately by NTS to sing the entries.

=== Het Europese Song Festival – Nationale finale ===
The final was held at the AVRO Studios in Hilversum on 24 April 1956 at 21:45 CET and lasted about 45 minutes. It was broadcast on NTS with the title Het Europese Song Festival – Nationale finale, and also in Belgium on NIR. It was produced by Piet de Nuyl jr. and directed by Ger Lugtenburg. Karin Kraaykamp presented the program. Two songs were sung by Bert Visser; Corry Brokken and Jetty Paerl sang three songs each. The artists were accompanied by the Metropole Orkest under the direction of Dolf van der Linden.

The songs were ranked by postcard voting. Television viewers should send in their postcards before 1 May 1956, containing one vote for their favourite song. The postcards with votes for the song which should place first, participated also in a lottery: The prize was a journey to the final in Lugano. The results were announced on 5 May 1956 in a television show held at the Minerva Theater in Heemstede. In total, 6,694 postcards were received.

The top two songs were "Voorgoed voorbij", written and composed by Jelle de Vries, and "De vogels van Holland", written by Annie M. G. Schmidt and composed by Cor Lemaire. "'t is lente", written by Alexander Pola and composed by Else van Epen, came third.

National final – 24 April 1956
R/O	Artist	Song	Songwriter(s)	Votes	Place
1	Corry Brokken	"Ik zei ja"	Jurriaan Andriessen	478	5
2	Jetty Paerl	"De vogels van Holland" (Note: Credited as "Vogels van Holland")	Annie M.G. Schmidt; Cor Lemaire	1,530	2
3	Bert Visser	"Gina mia"	Jelle de Vries	116	7
4	Jetty Paerl	"De telefoon"	Annie M.G. Schmidt; Cor Lemaire	438	6
5	Corry Brokken	"Voorgoed voorbij"	Jelle de Vries	1,854	1
6	Bert Visser	"Meisje"	Jurriaan Andriessen	34	8
7	Corry Brokken	"'t Is lente"	Alexander Pola; Else van Epen	1,210	3
8	Jetty Paerl	"Mei in Parijs"	Alexander Pola; Else van Epen	1,034	4

== At Eurovision ==
There were seven participating countries, and each was drawn to perform two songs in the same order via two rounds, with Netherlands performing first in each round, making "De vogels van Holland" the first song performed in the Eurovision Song Contest history.

Dolf van der Linden, who was originally selected to lead the orchestra for the Dutch entries, was unable to attend the contest. Therefore, both of the Dutch entries were conducted at the contest by the musical director Fernando Paggi.

Each country nominated two jury members who voted for their respective country by giving between one and ten points to each song, including those representing their own country. All jury members were colocated in a separate room in the venue in Lugano and followed the contest via a television set. The Dutch jury members were Lia Dorana and Ger Lugtenburg.

The placements of the Dutch entries are not known since the full results of the contest were not revealed and have not been retained by the EBU.

Eurovision Song Contest 1956 was televised in the Netherlands on NTS with commentary by Piet te Nuyl Jr.
