= Jetty Paerl =

Dutch singer

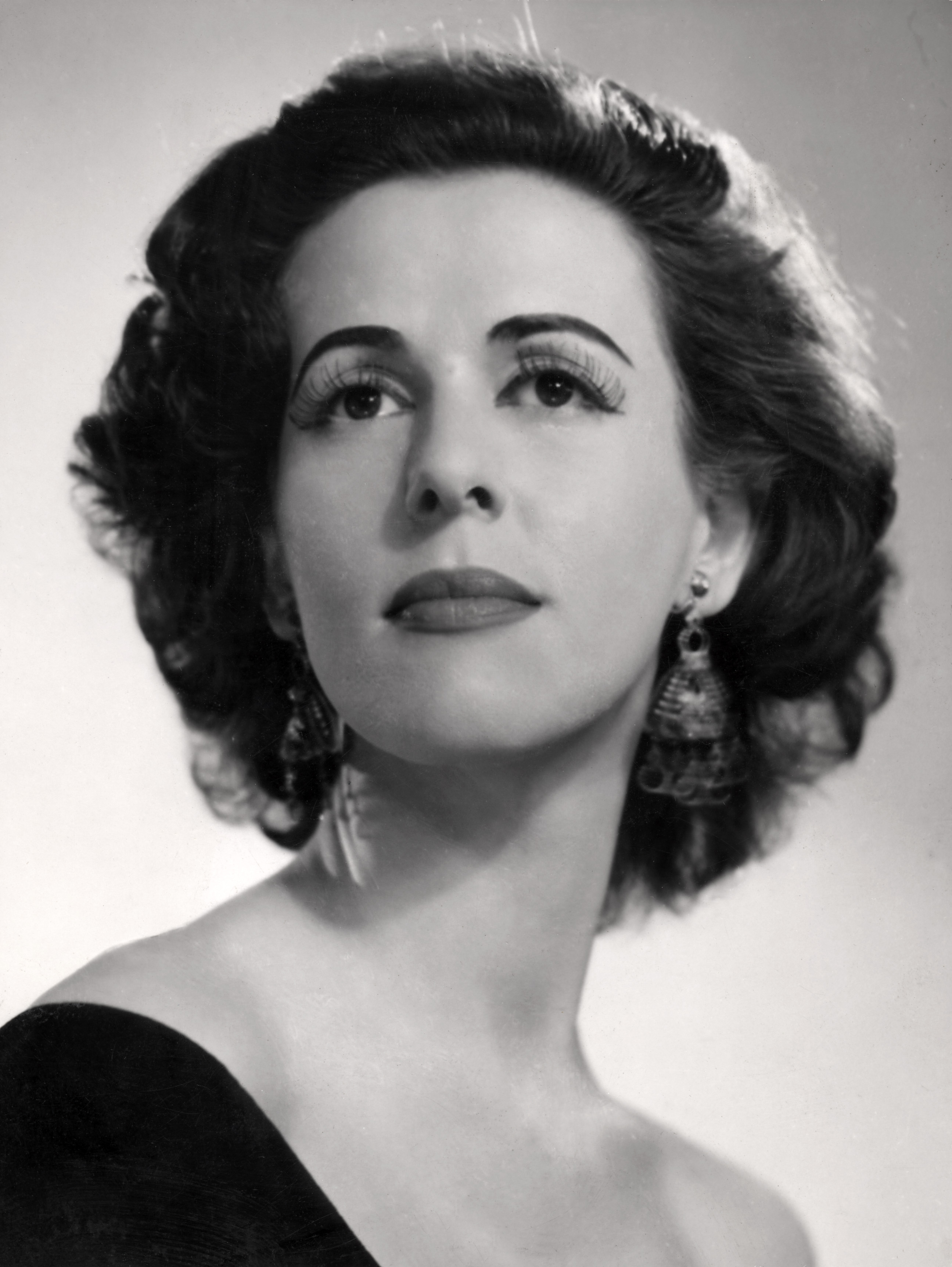
- Paerl in 1958

Background information
- Also known as: Jetje van Radio Oranje
- Born: Henriette Nanette Paerl; 27 May 1921; Amsterdam, Netherlands
- Died: 22 August 2013 (aged 92) Amstelveen, Netherlands
- Genres: Cabaret, chanson

Henriette Nanette "Jetty" Paerl (27 May 1921 – 22 August 2013) was a Dutch singer and resistance member of Jewish origin. She is known for being one of the Netherlands' representatives in the Eurovision Song Contest 1956 with the song "De vogels van Holland", and for being the first singer ever to perform in the Eurovision Song Contest.

== Biography ==
=== Early life ===
Paerl was born and raised in Amsterdam. After the German invasion of the Netherlands in May 1940, she fled to London with her parents and swimmer Willy den Ouden, where she worked as a children's clothing designer at a shop in New Bond Street. She also contributed to the broadcasts of Radio Oranje, a radio programme created by the Dutch government-in-exile, due to which she became known as Jetje van Radio Oranje ("Jetty of Radio Orange") in the Netherlands. In the programme, she performed songs – written by her father Jo Paerl and composed by Louis Davids and Dirk Witte – in which the Nazis and members of the dutch collaborationist National Socialist Movement (NSB) were openly made fun of.

Towards the end of the war, Paerl became a member of the Women's Auxiliary Corps (Vrouwen Hulpkorps) of the Royal Netherlands Army. After the liberation of the Netherlands in May 1945, she returned to her home country via Zeeland and was stationed in Rotterdam. Shortly after, she learned that both her elder brothers were still alive. One had fled to Switzerland, while the other had stayed in the Netherlands during the war.

=== After the war ===
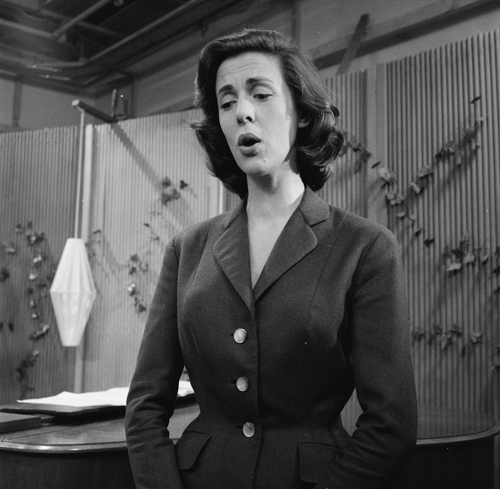
Paerl during a television broadcast in 1956

In 1951, Paerl married Dutch illustrator Cees Bantzinger. In 1956, she finished in second place in the Nationaal Songfestival 1956 with the song "De vogels van Holland", written by Annie M.G. Schmidt and composed by Cor Lemaire. This gave her the right, with Corry Brokken, to represent the Netherlands in the first edition of the Eurovision Song Contest. Being the first performer of the evening, Paerl wrote history as the first singer ever to perform in the Eurovision Song Contest.

In 1985, Paerl's husband revealed that he had been a member of the NSB for a short period of time in the beginning of World War II, after journalist Adriaan Venema had confronted him with letters he had sent to the Department of Public Information and the Arts at the time. One week later, Bantzinger committed suicide by drowning. Paerl herself died on 22 August 2013 in Amstelveen, at the age of 92.

== Discography ==
=== EPs ===
- Jetty Paerl – 1957
- Jetty Paerl 2 – 1957

=== Albums ===
- Jetje van Radio Oranje – 1970 (LP), 1995 (CD)

== Trivia ==
- Paerl appears in episode 18 of the British documentary series The World at War (1973–74).

Awards and achievements
Preceded by —	Netherlands in the Eurovision Song Contest; 1956	Succeeded by Corry Brokken with "Voorgoed voorbij"
