= Abeltje =

1953 novel by Annie M. G. Schmidt

- Cover for the First edition
- Author: Annie M.G. Schmidt
- Illustrator: Wim Bijmoer (first edition)
- Language: Dutch
- Genre: Adventure
- Published: 1953
- Publisher: De Arbeiderspers
- Publication place: Netherlands
- Pages: 192 (first edition)
- Followed by: De A van Abeltje

Abeltje is a children's novel by celebrated Dutch author Annie M. G. Schmidt, originally published in 1953 by De Arbeiderspers. It was one of Annie M. G. Schmidt's first children's books, and such an instant success that it was already in its fourth edition when the sequel, De A van Abeltje, came out in 1955. Since 1988, the book has been published by Querido with illustrations by Thé Tjong-Khing.

Abeltje has been adapted for radio and film. It has been translated from Dutch into Danish, Finnish, French, German, Hebrew, Japanese, Norwegian, Spanish, and Swedish.

The story of Abeltje has some similarities with the plot of Roald Dahl's Charlie and the Great Glass Elevator (1972), in which the main characters also fly around the world in an elevator.

== Plot ==
Young Abeltje gets a job as a liftboy in a department store. His boss tells him that he may not press the elevator's top (green) button under any circumstances. One time, when Abeltje gets into trouble, he presses the button, and the elevator goes shooting out the building and flies off.

Trapped with him on the elevator are a traveling mothball salesman, Jozias Tump; a singing instructor, Miss Klaterhoen, and a young girl, Laura. They fly across the ocean and eventually arrive in New York City, where they land in Central Park. In New York, Abeltje is mistaken for another boy who has gone missing. They leave New York and fly to South America, where Tump is made president of a banana republic and the missing boy is freed. A coup against Tump breaks out and the foursome once again manages to escape with their lift.

== Adaptations ==
=== Radio ===
Abeltje was also broadcast in the Netherlands in the 1950s as a radio play. In 2002, Abeltje and the sequel De A van Abeltje were published together in 2002 under the title Abeltje en de A van Abeltje. In 2008, a four-CD audiobook of Abeltje was published, read by Schmidt's zoon Flip van Duyn.

=== Film Adaptation ===
A film adaptation of the book, also called Abeltje (English title: The Flying Liftboy), was released by Warner Bros. on November 26, 1998. The film won the Golden Calf for best film in 1999. It was adapted into a seven-part television series that was broadcast in the Netherlands in 2000. The film largely follows the story of the book, although it was modernized in places. For instance, Abeltje has a skateboard and an earring in the film. His neighbor Laura is his girlfriend in the film, and his mother works in a flower shop in the book but owns her own garage in the film. Also, Abeltje accidentally encounters his lookalike Johnny in the book, but in the film he goes sleuthing to find Johnny.
