= Sebastian Star Bear: First Mission =

- Directed by: Frank Fehmers
- Written by: Richard Felgate; Michael Jupp
- Produced by: Frank Fehmers
- Edited by: Lorraine Miller
- Music by: Henri Seroka
- Distributed by: Concorde Film
- Release date: 11 October 1991
- Running time: 79 minutes
- Country: Netherlands
- Language: Dutch

Sebastian Star Bear: First Mission (original title Beertje Sebastiaan: De Geheime Opdracht) is a Dutch animated film released on October 11, 1991.

== Plot summary ==
The movie begins with a grizzly bear cub, Griselda, being told by her mother a story about bears from prehistoric times, led by Ursus, who were sent to the stars (The Ursa Major constellation) by their leader, in order to watch over the bears on Earth from there and protect them from harm.

Meanwhile, in San Francisco, a local theatre owner, Draco, is being intimidated by gangster McGrath, whom he owes a large amount of money, and his enforcer, Cuddles. Standing at the edge of bankruptcy, Draco desperately needs a new show, that would guarantee him a money income and thus repaying McGrath (in fact, Draco plans to escape with the money after the show). He decides to organize a performance of dancing bears. From now on, along with his simply-minded assistant Muggsy and Maestro - a pianist working at his theatre - Draco sets on a journey, hunting and imprisoning bears from around the world, forcing them to dance in his show.

One of the bears that were kidnapped by Draco was Griselda's mother. During the hunt, Draco and Muggsy were accompanied by adopted city dog, Sniffy, who chased Griselda (who saved herself by climbing on a tree), but simultaneously separated from his masters, who left him behind, as they left with Griselda's mother as captive. Hours pass. Griselda, still hiding on a tree, grows more and more upset, as she fruitlessly awaits her mother. As she starts crying, she looks into the stars, and reminds herself a story told by her mother. When she asks for help, a star ship arrives from the Ursa Major constellation, landing nearby. It appears, that it is piloted by Sebastian, the star bear, who comes in response for Griselda's plea for help. Along with her, his robot assistant SOUCI and Sniffy (who decided to join Sebastian), he sets on a journey to save Griselda's mother, and ruin Draco's plans, freeing bears imprisoned by him.

Using Sebastian's star ship, the team locates a train, transporting Draco and his assistants, as well as imprisoned Griselda's mother. They struggle to release the latter, but they are unable to do it, because she is held in a cage, locked on a padlock, to that only Draco has the key. During the action on a train, however, Sebastian manages to enter Draco's car (in an attempt to find the keys) and gain his personal notes. Soon after that, Sebastian is almost caught by humans, and the team is forced to run, leaving Griselda's mother - as well as Sniffy, who merely felt asleep in Draco's truck.

At the same time, Griselda, SOUCI and Sebastian travel by the latter's star ship again, this time trying to find out, what Draco's next move will be. Basing on the notes Sebastian found on the train, they arrive to the circus placed in Boulder Plains. As it soon appears, that circus has a show performed by bears in its repertoire, and is going be Draco's next target. After arriving there, they find Sniffy, who rejoins their team. To Draco's anger, Sebastian intervenes, when Draco and Muggsy are attempting to kidnap the performing bears. However, although Sebastian manages to ruin Draco's plans, he gets caught himself. He is taken away on Draco's truck, which later boards the plane. Griselda and SOUCI are shocked to witness that, but are unable to save Sebastian on time, and thus are forced to look for him, on the board of the star ship. Meanwhile, on Draco's airplane, Sebastian in held captive in a cage. Draco, as it appears, plans to kill him, by dropping him into sea and therefore drowning. However, that plan is not realized, because when Draco, Muggsy and Maestro fell all asleep, Sebastian uses his graviton (a portable device, capable of eliminating gravity and thus levitating objects) to obtain the key to the cage he is held in (using the graviton also enables SOUCI to lock on Sebastian's position). Sebastian then gets into the truck's cockpit and drives away from the board of the plane through the cargo door, despite Muggsy's attempts to stop him. Floating in the space, Sebastian is finally found by SOUCI and reunites with the team.

The next theatre of Draco's actions proves to be China, where he plans to catch a local panda. Sebastian and his team arrive there as well, and run into Draco during their travel through the country. SOUCI is badly damaged and almost destroyed, when Draco's truck runs over her. Sebastian and Griselda are almost caught, but Sniffy helps them to escape, desperately attacking humans. SOUCI, damaged too heavily to walk, is carried away by Sebastian. After getting far away from Draco, Sebastian leaves SOUCI on the ground, promising, that we will be back to take her home. Sebastian, Griselda and Sniffy visit the mysterious magician and inventor, Ha So, who invites them to his palace, and presents the device of his project, the transvisualator, which enables them to observe the panda. The latter is being caught by Draco at the same time, but Sebastian modifies the device, making it capable of "teleporting" the panda safely into Ha So's palace, therefore disrupting Draco's plans again. Sebastian then uses transvisualator to teleport Muggsy, who is next tied to a chair and questioned by Sebastian, who forces him (by using the graviton to make him fly and become dizzy) to reveal, where the Draco's bear show will be performed. With this information, Sebastian, Griselda and Sniffy fly to San Francisco in order to begin the final showdown with Draco.

When they arrive, the show starts already, and the house is full of people (including McGrath). Although Draco tries to stop Sebastian, the actions of the latter, as well as Griselda and Sniffy, cause the disarray. When Griselda gets on the scene, the bear trainer, trying to catch her, uses his whip, hurting the dancing bears as a consequence, and thus enraging the audience, who demand to stop the show. Later the people panic, when released bears leave the scene. In the chaos, Draco escapes as well, taking money he earned on the performance, to McGrath's anger. Sebastian leads the bears out of theatre and uses the tramway to transport them all out from the city. During this, they nearly run over Draco's truck, damaging it heavily and making to run out of control. Draco, Muggsy and Maestro drive into the lake, where they are caught by an enraged McGrath. Meanwhile, the tramway full of bears reaches the forest near the city - bears imprisoned by Draco, along with Griselda's mother, are finally free.

Sebastian's mission is over, so he brings Griselda and her mother back to the land they came from (Sniffy, however, stays in San Francisco). After bidding goodbye with Griselda (who hopes of seeing him again in the future), he flies back to China, picking up SOUCI still lying there. They both fly back to their planet. During that travel, SOUCI miraculously becomes what she has dreamed of to become - the true star bear.

== Characters ==
- Sebastian – An extraterrestrial Star Bear from the Ursa Major constellation who flies to Earth in his CRYOG after hearing Griselda's plea for help. He received his training at Star School, and Griselda's case is his first mission. He is enthusiastic and lively, with an endearing non-geocentric naïveté, unaware of what bears, padlocks, and trains are until he arrives on Earth. Never discouraged, he keeps his friends' spirits up when they are up against difficult challenges. Although he is confident, he remains realistic, and does not overestimate his abilities.
- SOUCI (Speech-Operated Universal Computer Intelligence) – A SOUCI is a computer that every Star Bear is issued after training, but Sebastian's SOUCI" is a girl who thinks she's a bear". Despite being a computer, SOUCI is sentient and displays a wide range of emotions. Although she has frequent tiffs with Sebastian, she cares for him and attempts to protect him when he is threatened. She also pilots the CRYOG when Sebastian is on the ground.
- Griselda – A grizzly bear cub who pleas to "The Great Bear" for help after her mother is kidnapped by bear hunters. She is devastated by the capture of her mother, tearing up at the mere mention of her. She is polite and kind, although she is initially wary of Sniffy because of his affiliation with the bear hunters. She is fascinated by Sebastian and his technology, and seems to develop a crush on him.
- Sniffy – A city dog who was adopted by Draco from the pound as a "bear hound". After Draco and company leave him behind in the forest, he joins Sebastian to rescue Griselda's mother.
- Draco - A broke theatre owner who is in debt to the gangster, Mr. McGrath. Needing a big show to earn money quickly, Draco decides to trap and steal bears from around the world and force them to dance at his theatre, planning to escape to Mexico with the profits before McGrath returns.
- Muggsy - Draco's dim-witted assistant. Despite his stupidity, Muggsy is more observant and more kind-hearted than Draco, showing concern for Sebastian's welfare when Draco plans to kill him.
- Maestro - A musician who works for Draco at the theatre. He is at first reluctant to join Draco's bear hunt, but agrees to go after Draco convinces him that they can work on the show's score while travelling.
- Ha So - A Chinese magician and inventor who uses the "transvisualator" to locate the bear hunters when they come to China. To save the panda Qing Qing from capture, Sebastian modifies the transvisualator and transports her safely to Ha So's castle.

== Voice cast ==
Character	Original	English
Sebastian	Olaf Wijnants	Unknown
SOUCI (Speech-Operated Universal Computer Intelligence)	Angelique de Boer	Unknown
Griselda	Margriet van Lidth	Unknown
Sniffy	Frits Lambrechts	Unknown
Draco	Tom Meijer	Unknown
Muggsy	Jaap Stobbe	Unknown
Maestro	Paul van Gorcum	Unknown
Ha So	Hein Boele	Unknown
Sheena	Maria Lindes	Unknown
Mackerel	Edward Reekers	Unknown
Hug	Hero Muller	Unknown

=== Additional Voices ===
- Original: Arnold Gelderman
- English: Peter Banks, Thom Booker, Jane Goddard, Garrick Hagon, Jana Sheldon, Shelly Thompson, Dick Vosburgh

== Soundtrack ==
Sebastian Star Bear (Soundtrack from the Motion Picture)

Soundtrack album by Henri Seroka
- Released: June 10, 2009
- Recorded: 1990
- Genre: Soundtrack
- Length: 32:20
- Label: Believe

1. "Sebastian Star Bear Song" – 3:22
2. "Panoramic" – 0:36
3. "Medley Sebastian Theme" – 5:26
4. "We Are a Terrible Trio" – 2:30
5. "Magical Incidental" – 1:14
6. "Chase" – 0:41
7. "End of the Earth" – 5:16
8. "Action Sebastian" – 2:33
9. "Circus Waltz" – 1:26
10. "Ballad of Sniffy" – 0:38
11. "Maesto's Theme" – 1:16
12. "Sebastian" – 0:34
13. "Star Bear Comic" – 0:48
14. "Draco" – 0:51
15. "Sebastian's Theme" – 1:04
16. "What a Bear" – 4:05
