= Frits Lambrechts =

Dutch actor, musician and cabaret artist (born 1937)

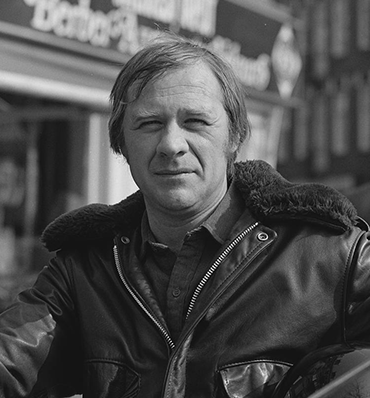
- Frits Lambrechts as Toon in De Lemmings in 1980
- Born: Fredericus Amos Lambrechts; 24 March 1937 (age 89); Amsterdam, Netherlands
- Occupations: Artist, actor
- Years active: 1963–present

Fredericus Amos (Frits) Lambrechts (born 24 March 1937) is a Dutch actor, musician and cabaret artist.

== Career ==
He started with cabaret, and was discovered in 1964 by writer and comedian Jaap Van de Merwe. After seeing him perform in Amsterdam, Van der Merwe hired him and made him participate as the pianist to his performances. After his collaboration with Van de Merwe, he worked with Wim Kan and Henk Elsink, among others. Thereafter he was active in music, singing and acting. In 1971 he was awarded a Zilveren Harp for his contribution to the Dutch song. Lambrechts was a contributor to the satirical radio program Cursief in the early 1970s.

From November 1984 to December 1993 Lambrechts was Hoofdpiet in television programs about Sinterklaas. He later gave up portraying the character, which was taken over by Erik de Vogel. Between 1991 and 2010 he dubbed Tigger in the Dutch dubbing of the Winnie the Pooh cartoons. In the 1990s he appeared in television commercials for Gamma. He had a recurring role in Goede tijden, slechte tijden, and appeared as Meeuwse in All Stars. In the film and television series The Flying Liftboy he had an important supporting role as Jozias Tump. He later dubbed Mater in the film series Cars (from 2006) and the main character Carl Fredricksen in Up (2009).

In 2003 Lambrechts received a Gouden Beelden for Best Actor. He was awarded this prize for his role as a mildly demented elderly man in Sloophamer.

In 2015 he participated in the play Frits! Laten we lastig zijn.

Between 2017 and 2019 he was featured in the television series Het geheime dagboek van Hendrik Groen. In 2020 and 2021, he played Frank Lammers' father in Jumbo commercials. In 2021, he had a guest role in the third season of TV series Mocro Maffia (televisieserie).

== Political involvement ==
Since the 1960s, Lambrechts was a member of the Communist Party of the Netherlands, CPN. As such, he also showed his outspoken leftish orientation in his cabaret and song texts. Later (when CPN was dissolved) he did some work for the Dutch Socialist Party, SP. In 1994, he was cast for the leading part in a TV series for Dutch evangelical broadcaster EO, De laatste carrière (The final career). When preparations had already started and shooting the first scenes was imminent, his contribution to the series was cancelled because of his former CPN membership. The director of the series, Jan Keja, resigned for that reason, while even speaking of Berufsverbot.

== Filmography ==
=== Film and television ===
- De inbreker (1972) - detective van Hol (Stoere)
- Waaldrecht (TV series) - Willem Barnhoorn (episode Taxi Meneer?, 1973)
- Twee onder een klap (TV series) - Bob Jongeneel (1973)
- Boerin in Frankrijk (TV series) - Kees (1973)
- Zwaarmoedige verhalen voor bij de centrale verwarming - Gerrie in part 3: Zeeman tussen wal en schip (1975)
- Hollands Glorie (TV series) - Machinist Verwoert (1976)
- Cassata (TV series) - Kees (episodes 1–8, 1979)
- De brandnetelkoning (TV-docudrama) - Chemical factory worker Frans Messing, (1979)
- De Lemmings (TV series) (1980) - Toon
- Het oponthoud (televisiefilm, 1982) - Garage owner
- Het wonder van Rotterdam (1984) - Uncredited
- De ijssalon (1985) - NSB party guy
- Thomas en Senior (TV series) - Crook Karel (3 episodes, 1985)
- Geef je ouders maar weer de schuld - Father Nol (1985-1986)
- Het wassende water (TV series) - auctioneer Klaas Merkesteijn (1 episode, 1986)
- Sinterklaas in Sesamstraat (NPS, 1987–1993, 1995) - Hoofdpiet (1995)
- Alfred J. Kwak (TV series) - Henk de Mol (1989-1991, stem)
- Medisch Centrum West (TV series) - Joop (1990)
- Goede tijden, slechte tijden (TV series) - Willem Kelder (1990-1991, 1993)
- Beertje Sebastiaan: De geheime opdracht (1991) - Snuffie (voice)
- Vrienden voor het leven - Mr Van Steunzolen (episode 12 ambachten, 1992)
- Ha, die Pa! (TV series) - Gijs (episode Eindexamen, 1992)
- Coverstory (TV series) - Inspector Pieters (episode 1.8, 1993)
- Het zonnetje in huis (TV series) - Man in waiting room (episode Moederschap, 1994)
- Het zonnetje in huis (TV series) - Video store owner (episode Bandenpech, 1996)
- SamSam (TV series) - Hennie (episode Riet is er niet, 1994)
- Flodder (TV series) - (episode De hondlanger, 1995)
- Baantjer (TV series) - Schubben Sjakie (episode De Cock en de moord op de marktmeester, 1996)
- Flodder (TV series) - Harco Sorbato (episode Vrijdag de 13e, 1997)
- Ik ben je moeder niet (TV series) - Jan (episode De zus van Trudy, 1996)
- All Stars (1997) - Meeuwse
- Zeeuws Meisje (TV series) - Pa Hielke (1998)
- Abeltje (1998) - Jozias Tump
- Somberman's actie (1999) - Rinie Kaak
- Spangen (TV series) - Kobus Visser (episode Rio, 1999)
- De rode zwaan (1999) - Uncredited
- Russen (TV series) - Fons de Knecht (episode Taxi, 2000)
- The Flying Liftboy (TV series) - Jozias Tump (2000)
- Minoes (2001) - Joop (voice)
- Kees & Co (2001) - Oom Leo (episode "Luister en huiver", 2001)
- The Champ (2002) - Mr. Hemming
- Ja zuster, nee zuster (2002) - Grandpa
- Sloophamer (Television film, 2003) - Dirk van den Berg
- Van God Los (2003) - Van de Velde
- Baantjer (TV series) - Eef de Beer (episode De Cock en de moord op Arie Bombarie, 2004)
- Pluk van de petteflet (2004) - Heen- en Weerwolf (voice)
- Opruiming (2005) - Man
- Het woeden der gehele wereld (2006) - Uncredited
- Nachtrit (2006) - Uncredited
- Leer Effe Fietsen (2006) - Grandpa
- Van Speijk (TV series) - Mr. Horstman (3 episodes., 2006–2007)
- Oppassen!!! (TV series, 2009) - kastelein (1 episode)
- De laatste reis van meneer Van Leeuwen (telefilm, 2010) - Mr Van Leeuwen
- Flikken Maastricht (2011) - Arnout
- Sonny Boy (2011) - Sam
- All Stars 2: Old Stars (2011) - Meeuwse
- Koning van Katoren (2012) - Janus
- Aaf (TV series, 2013) - Grandpa, Ton's father
- Nooit te oud (Television film, 2013) - Elderly person in wheelchair
- Hartenstraat (2014) -
- Het geheime dagboek van Hendrik Groen (TV series, 2017–2019) - Mr Hoogdalen
- Dokter Tinus - Fred Pot (2013, 2017)
- Komt een man bij de dokter (2020)
- Mocro Maffia - Kees (2021)

=== Animation ===
- Rocco, the gorilla in Eiland Van Noach, Het
- Tigger in Winnie the Pooh until when replaced by Kees van Lier
- Gus in Cinderella
- Louie in TaleSpin
- Dodger in Oliver & Company
- Prop in Prop en Bertha
- Sir Rothbart in The Swan Princess
- Sniffy in Sebastian Star Bear: First Mission
- Aard Appel in Aard Appel en Krieltje
- Wilbur in The Rescuers Down Under
- Mater in Cars, Cars 2, Cars 3, Mater and the Ghostlight
- Bloat in Finding Nemo and Finding Dory
- Scrapperton in Super Robot Monkey Team Hyperforce Go!
- Henk the mole in Alfred J. Kwak
- Flip in Little Nemo: Adventures in Slumberland
- Smokey in Stuart Little
- Carl Fredricksen in Up
- Carl Fredericksen in Dug's Special Mission
- The Lorax in The Lorax
- Cookie in Atlantis: The Lost Empire and Atlantis: Milo's Return
- Captain Frank in the 2005 Race naar de maan

=== Plays and musicals ===
- Bagage (Stage and music with zZz)
- Python
- Grace
- Monument voor mijn vader
- Krapuul
- De Zonnebloem
- Jona de NEE zegger
- Kruimeltje
- Bulletje & Bonestaak
- De Kleine Kapitein
- De brief voor de koning
- Brandende liefde
- Willeke de musical
- Mike & Thomas Kerstrevue 2012
- Zeldzaam 1988
- 1000 Wishes (for KiKa with PBII)
