= Jip and Janneke =

Book series by Annie M.G. Schmidt

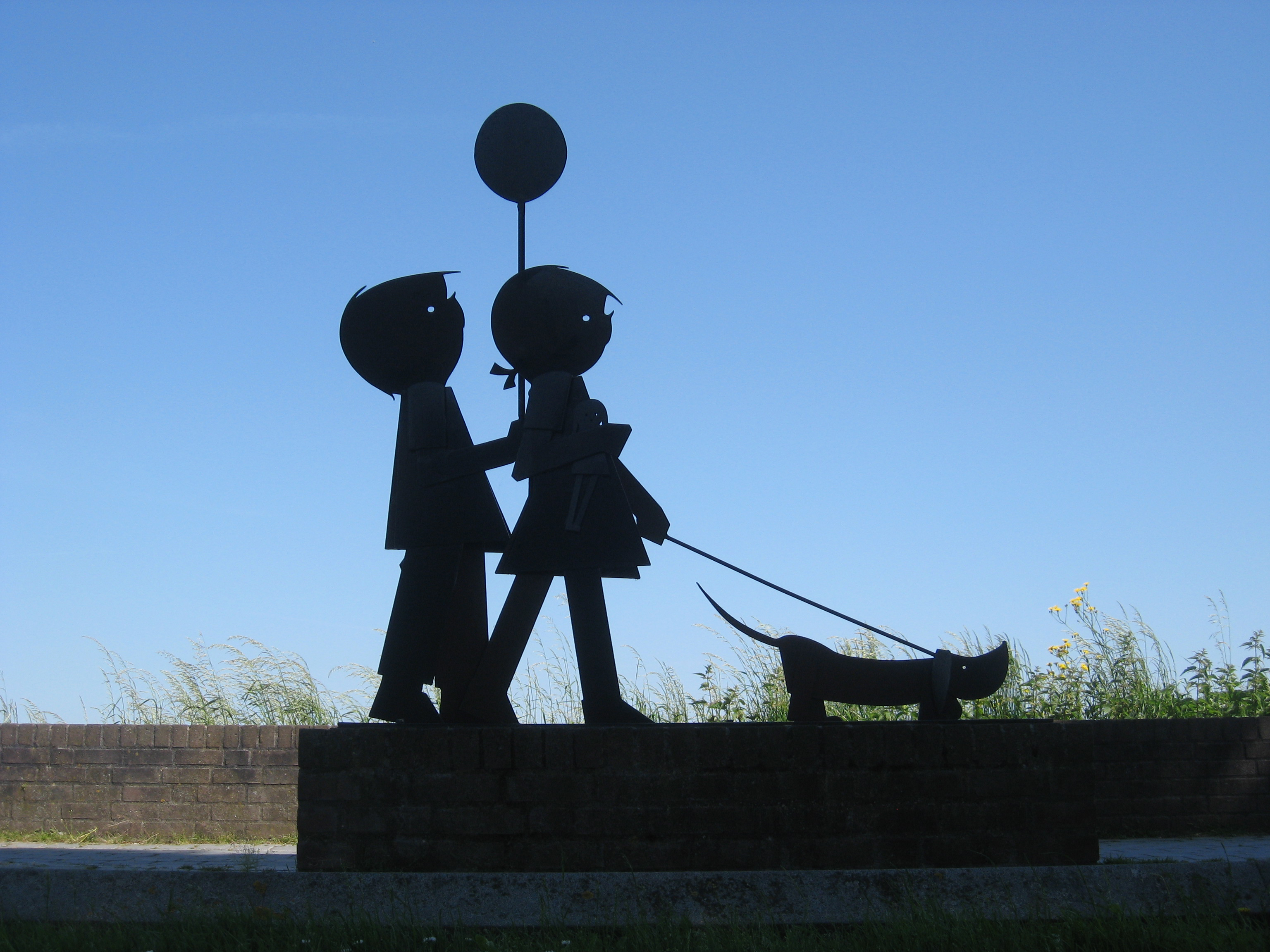
- Jip en Janneke statue in Zaltbommel, Netherlands
- Author: Annie M. G. Schmidt
- Original title: Jip en Janneke
- Illustrator: Fiep Westendorp
- Country: Netherlands
- Language: Dutch
- Genre: Children's literature
- Publisher: De Arbeiderspers (original); Querido (current)
- Published: 1953–1960
- Media type: Print
- No. of books: 8 (original series)

Jip and Janneke (Dutch: Jip en Janneke) is a series of children's books in the Netherlands, written by Annie M. G. Schmidt and illustrated by Fiep Westendorp. The series is known for its simplicity and wit.

The series was originally written for the newspaper Het Parool. Between 13 September 1952 and 7 September 1957 a weekly episode of no more than 250 words was published. Each episode is an independent story in itself. The stories were later collected and published as books.

The series has been translated into a number of languages, including Chinese (called Yǐyǐ hé Yāyā, simplified Chinese: 乙乙和丫丫), Hebrew, and Latin (called Jippus et Jannica). Three English versions have been published. Mick and Mandy, an adaptation with the original illustrations, and Bob and Jilly, translations with new illustrations, are no longer in print. In 2008 the Dutch publisher, Querido, published a new translation by David Colmer of the first book of the series, with the original illustrations, entitled Jip and Janneke.

The series has become something of a popular icon of childhood and has inspired a large amount of merchandise. One of the best known of these is Jip and Janneke Bubbelsap (Bubble Juice), which is a non-alcoholic carbonated lemonade sold in Champagne-style plastic bottles, popular at children's parties and for new year celebrations.

In recent years, Jip and Janneke has become part of an expression. Jip and Janneke language (Dutch: jip-en-janneketaal) has come to mean "simple language", layman's terms or plain language. It is most often used in the context of politics, when politicians think they need to express their ideas in Jip and Janneke language in order to make the people understand what they are talking about.

== Books ==
English translation

- (2023) The Complete Jip and Janneke. Transl. by David Colmer. Amsterdam, Querido. ISBN 9789045128481

Original series

- (1953) Jip en Janneke (Jip and Janneke)
- (1954) De groeten van Jip en Janneke (Greetings from Jip and Janneke)
- (1955) Hop maar Jip en Janneke (Hop On, Jip and Janneke)
- (1956) Daar gaan Jip en Janneke (There Go Jip and Janneke)
- (1957) Een zoentje van Jip en Janneke (A Little Kiss from Jip and Janneke)
- (1958) Goed zo, Jip en Janneke (Well Done, Jip and Janneke)
- (1959) Pas op, Jip en Janneke (Watch Out, Jip and Janneke)
- (1960) Eventjes lachen, Jip en Janneke (Just Smile, Jip and Janneke)

Reissued series

- (1963) Jip en Janneke: Eerste boek (Jip and Janneke: First Book)
- (1964) Jip en Janneke: Tweede boek (Jip and Janneke: Second book)
- (1964) Jip en Janneke: Derde boek (Jip and Janneke: Third Book)
- (1964) Jip en Janneke: Vierde boek (Jip and Janneke: Fourth Book)
- (1965) Jip en Janneke: Vijfde boek (Jip and Janneke: Fifth Book)

Omnibus

- (1977) Jip en Janneke (Jip and Janneke)
