= Fiep Westendorp =

Dutch illustrator (1916–2004)

- Born: Sophia Maria Westendorp; 17 December 1916; Zaltbommel, Netherlands
- Died: 3 February 2004 (aged 87); Amsterdam, Netherlands
- Known for: Jip and Janneke

Sophia Maria "Fiep" Westendorp (17 December 1916 – 3 February 2004) was a Dutch illustrator who became popular due to her long collaboration with writer Annie M.G. Schmidt with their creation of Jip and Janneke.

== Career ==
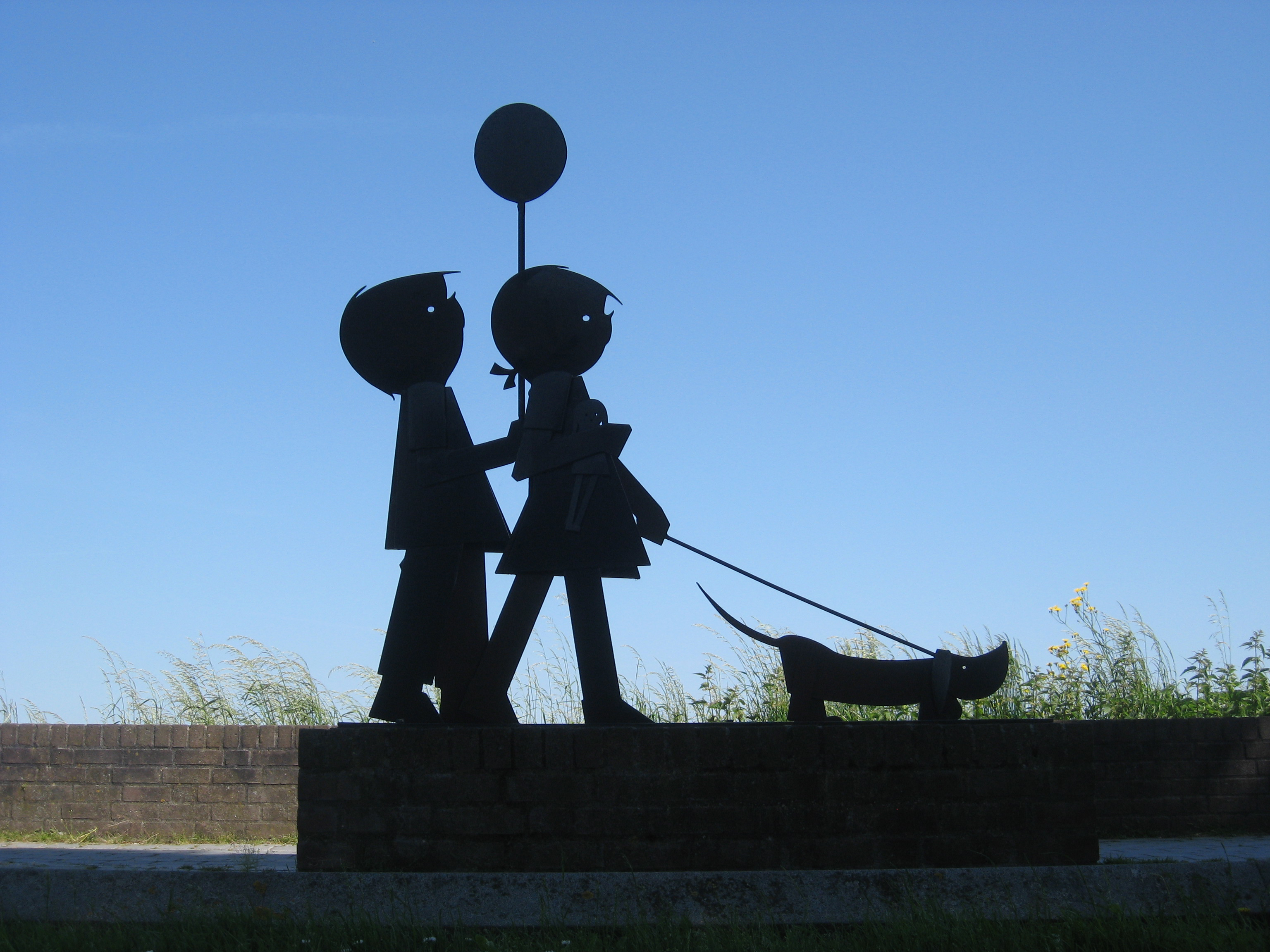
Jip & Janneke

Three generations of Dutch people have grown up with her illustrations. The drawings she made for Jip en Janneke, a series of stories which ran in Dutch newspaper Het Parool from 1953 to 1957, now adorn a variety of items sold by Dutch department store HEMA. Since the regular Dutch awards for illustrations always eluded her, she was given a unique award for her entire oeuvre in 1997. Westendorp also drew a text comic based on the Annie M.G. Schmidt story Tante Patent in the 1950s.

== Legacy ==
She died in 2004. Since 2007, the University of Amsterdam has had an endowed chair for illustration in Westendorp's honor.
