= Odoardo Spadaro =

Italian singer-songwriter and actor

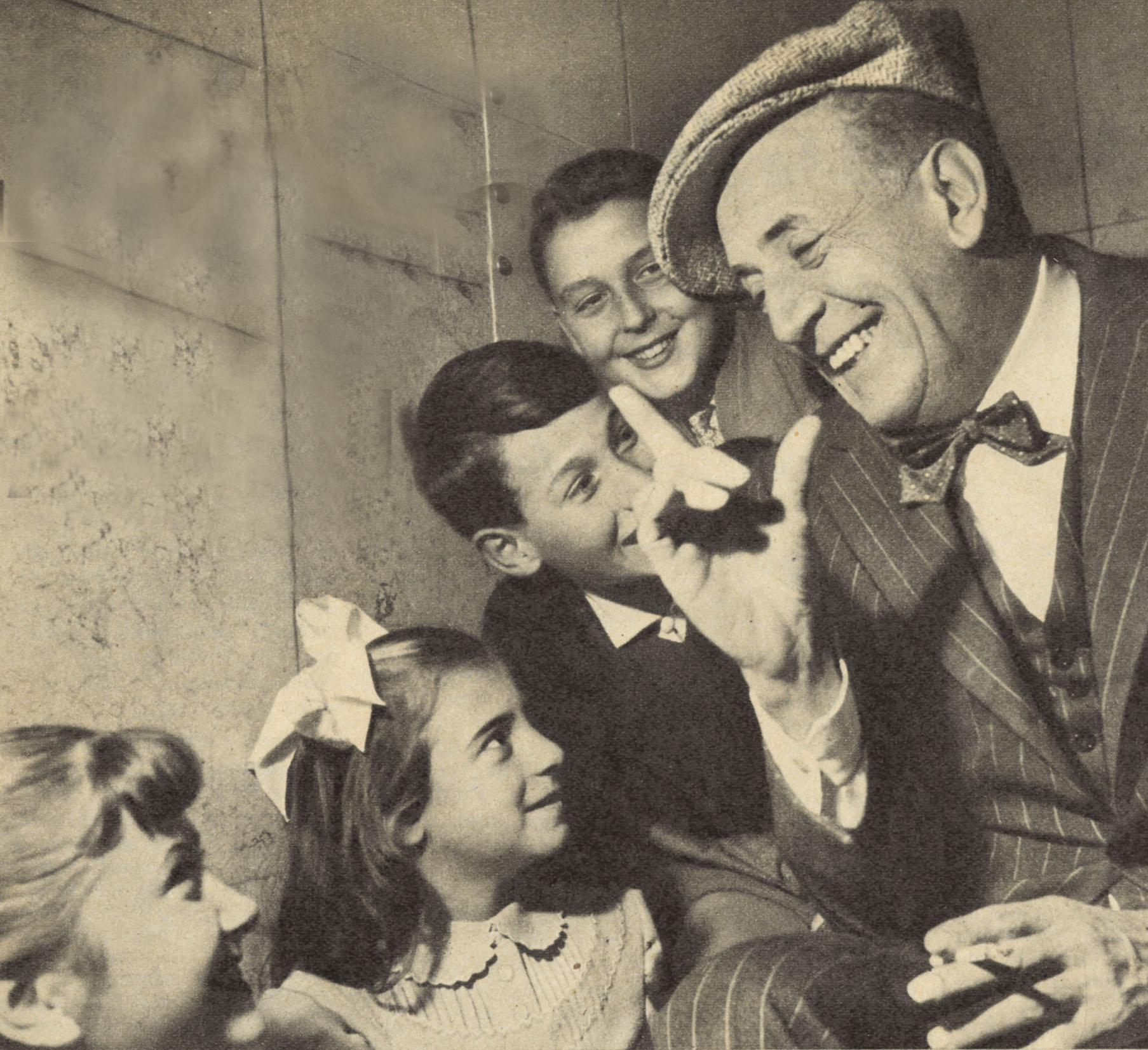
- Spadaro in 1958
- Born: Odoardo Eugenio Giano Spadaro; 16 January 1893; Florence, Kingdom of Italy
- Died: 26 June 1965 (aged 72); Florence, Italy
- Resting place: Cimitero delle Porte Sante, Florence, Italy
- Occupations: Actor, singer-songwriter
- Years active: 1912–1964
- Spouse: Clementina Lovisolo (m. 1924)

Odoardo Eugenio Giano Spadaro (16 January 1893 - 26 June 1965) was an Italian singer-songwriter and actor.

== Early life ==
Spadaro was born in the quartiere of Santo Spirito in Florence, to Gustavo Spadaro and Mary Marchesini.

== Career ==
He debuted on stage at seventeen years old and, taking the road into variety shows as a chansonnier, a fantasist and impersonator, he became an international celebrity when he replaced Maurice Chevalier at the Folies-Bergère in Paris.

In 1927 he was protagonist alongside Viviane Romance and Jean Gabin of a very successful variety show at the Moulin Rouge.

Regarded as the first great Italian singer-songwriter, Spadaro also wrote many successful songs dedicated to his home city in the 1930s and 40s including lyrics and music.; the best known of these being probably "Porta un bacione a Firenze" (Bring a Kiss to Florence).

Spadoro acted in several films, usually in supporting roles and appeared in The Golden Coach (La carrozza d'oro) with Anna Magnani in 1952. In 1953 he played Pinzi in Musoduro, a French-Italian drama film directed by Giuseppe Bennati in a cast led by Fausto Tozzi, Marina Vlady and Cosetta Greco. He was Baron Gaetano Cefalù in the 1961 comedy Divorce Italian Style. and appeared in Renato Castellani's Italian comedy-drama Mad Sea (Mare Matto) in 1963. The cast, headed by Gina Lollobrigida and Jean-Paul Belmondo, included Tomas Milian, himself, Noël Roquevert and Dominique Boschero.

== Personal life ==
He and Clementina Lovisolo were married in 1924.

== Death ==
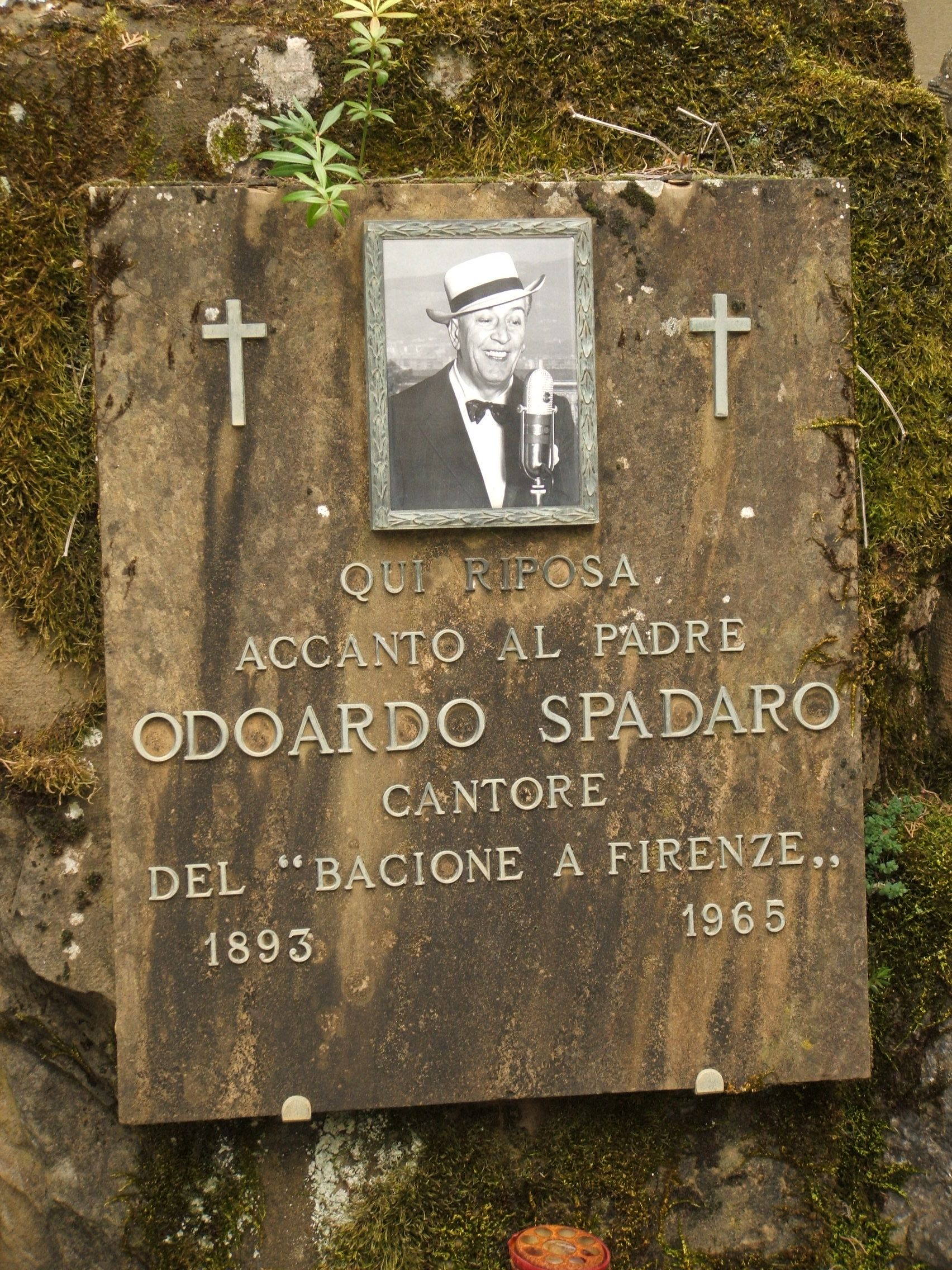
Grave of Odoardo Spadaro at Cimitero delle Porte Sante in Florence, Italy.

Spadaro died on 26 June 1965 in his home town, Firenze, Toscana, Italy of unspecified causes. He was 72.

== Filmography ==
Year	Title	Role	Notes
1920	La collana del milione		
1930	Ninna nanna delle dodici mamme		
1934	La fanciulla dell'altro mondo	Mario	
1935	Maestro Landi	'Maestro' Landi - il boia di Firenze	
1943	Arcobaleno		
1950	Miss Italia	Master of ceremonies	
1952	La carrozza d'oro	Don Antonio	
1953	Musoduro (aka The Hunt)	Pinzi, venditore ambulante	
1953	Viva la rivista!	Cantante	
1955	Carousel of Variety		
1956	Porta un bacione a Firenze	L'emigrante	
1959	Un canto nel deserto		
1961	Divorce Italian Style	Don Gaetano Cefalù	
1961	La corona di fuoco	Padre Bernardo	
1962	The Reluctant Saint	Old Examining Prelate	
1962	The Captive City	Janny Mendoris	
1962	Escapade in Florence	Padrone	
1963	Mad Sea	Drudo Parenti	
1964	Full Hearts and Empty Pockets	Coachman	
1964	The Naked Hours	Il nonno	
1964	Napoleone a Firenze		
