= The War of the Volcanoes =

2012 film by Francesco Patierno

The War of the Volcanoes (Italian original title La guerra dei vulcani) is a 2012 documentary film directed by Francesco Patierno detailing the filming of Roberto Rossellini's 1950 film Stromboli starring Ingrid Bergman and the 1950 film Volcano starring Anna Magnani.
