= Volcano (1950 film) =

- Release poster
- Directed by: William Dieterle
- Screenplay by: Vitaliano Brancati; Mario Chiari; Victor Stoloff; Piero Tellini
- Story by: Renzo Avanzo
- Produced by: William Dieterle
- Starring: Anna Magnani
- Cinematography: Arturo Gallea
- Edited by: Giancarlo Cappelli
- Music by: Enzo Masetti
- Production companies: Artisti Associati; Panaria Film
- Distributed by: Artisti Associati
- Release date: 2 February 1950
- Running time: 106 minutes
- Countries: Italy; United States
- Languages: Italian, then English

Volcano (Italian: Vulcano) is a 1950 Italian drama film directed by William Dieterle and starring Anna Magnani, Rossano Brazzi, and Geraldine Brooks. It was filmed on location on Salina Island, in the Aeolian Islands, and in the city of Messina on Sicily.

Vulcano has been seen by some as a vehicle of revenge by Anna Magnani against her estranged lover at the time, Italian film director Roberto Rossellini, who had chosen Ingrid Bergman to star in his film series about marriage, instead of her. Rossellini made his film Stromboli on the nearby volcanic island of Stromboli at the same time as Volcano was being made on Salina.

Both films were shot simultaneously in similar locales in the Aeolian Islands, only 40 km apart; both actresses played independent-minded roles in a neorealist fashion. Life magazine wrote, "... in an atmosphere crackling with rivalry... Reporters were accredited, like war correspondents, to one or the other of the embattled camps.... Partisanship infected the Via Veneto (boulevard in Rome), where Magnaniacs and Bergmaniacs clashed frequently." However, Magnani still considered Rossellini the "greatest director she ever acted for".

== Plot ==
The film plot involves a former prostitute, Maddalena Natoli (played by Magnani), who was exiled to the island of her birth by the police. There, she suffers ostracism by the islanders, and she tries to defend the virtue of her younger sister from the advances of a deep-sea diver. Vulcano runs for about 106 minutes.

== Cast ==
- Anna Magnani as Maddalena Natoli
- Rossano Brazzi as Donato
- Geraldine Brooks as Maria
- Eduardo Ciannelli as Giulio
- Adriano Ambrogi as Don Antonio
- Lucia Belfadel as Carmela
- Cesare Giuffre as Alvaro
- Enzo Staiola as Nino
- Marcello Gatti

== See also ==
- The War of the Volcanoes — A 2012 Italian documentary film about the filming of Stromboli and Volcano
- Two Volcanoes, Two Films. ''Stromboli'' versus ''Vulcano''. Ingrid Bergman versus Anna Magnani, by Jobst C. Knigge, online on academia. edu.
