= The Golden Coach =

1952 film directed by Jean Renoir

- French film poster
- Directed by: Jean Renoir
- Screenplay by: Jean Renoir; Jack Kirkland; Renzo Avanzo; Giulio Macchi; Ginette Doynel (Note: Doynel is not credited in the English-language credits of the English-language print of the film.)
- Based on: Le Carrosse du Saint-Sacrement (1829), a play by Prosper Mérimée (Note: Mérimée's play is not credited as source material in the English-language credits of the English-language print of the film.)
- Produced by: Francesco Alliata
- Starring: Anna Magnani; Odoardo Spadaro; Nada Fiorelli; Duncan Lamont; George Higgins; Ralph Truman; Gisella Matthews; Jean Debucourt
- Cinematography: Claude Renoir
- Edited by: David Hawkins; Mario Serandrei (Note: Serandrei is not credited in the English-language credits of the English-language print of the film.)
- Music by: Antonio Vivaldi
- Distributed by: Les Films Corona
- Release dates: 3 December 1952 (Italy); 27 February 1953 (France)
- Running time: 103 min
- Countries: France; Italy
- Language: English
- Budget: $500,000

The Golden Coach (French: Le Carrosse d'or; Italian: La carrozza d'oro) is a 1952 film directed by Jean Renoir. It stars Anna Magnani, Duncan Lamont, Paul Campbell, Riccardo Rioli, and Odoardo Spadaro. The story, about an Italian commedia dell'arte troupe in Peru in the early 18th century, was adapted by Renoir, Jack Kirkland, Renzo Avanzo, and Giulio Macchi from Prosper Mérimée's 1829 play Le carrosse du Saint-Sacrement (The Coach of the Blessed Sacrament). The soundtrack consists of selections from the works of Antonio Vivaldi.

== Plot ==
The Viceroy of a remote 18th-century Peruvian town has ordered a magnificent golden coach from Europe, intending to pay for it with public funds. There is speculation that he is going to give it to his mistress, the Marquise, but he says he plans to use it to overawe the populace and flatter the local nobility, who enthusiastically look forward to taking turns parading in it. By coincidence, the coach arrives on the same ship that carries an Italian commedia dell'arte troupe composed of men, women, and children who perform as singers, actors, and acrobats. The troupe is led by Don Antonio, who also portrays the stock character of Pantalone on stage, and features Camilla, who plays the stock role of Columbina.

Once the members of the troupe refurbish the town's dilapidated theater, their performances meet with success only after local hero Ramón, a bullfighter, becomes smitten with Camilla and starts leading the applause. Similarly, after a command performance at the Viceroy's palace, the gentry withhold their favor until the Viceroy signals his approval and asks to meet the women of the company. He, too, is taken with Camilla, who makes him feel comfortable and lighthearted. When the Viceroy sends Camilla a splendid necklace, Felipe, her jealous suitor who has been accompanying the troupe on their travels, becomes enraged and tries to take it from her, causing a riotous backstage brawl, after which he runs off to join the army.

The Viceroy announces that he has decided to pay for the coach with his own money and give it to Camilla. This outrages the Marquise, along with the rest of the nobility, who are already smarting over the Viceroy's demands for money to finance a military campaign against an insurgency. Led by the Duke, the nobles threaten to strip the Viceroy of his post, unless he transfers the coach over to the government and only lets it be used for official purposes. When he is about to agree, Camilla, who has been eavesdropping, enters and calls the Viceroy a little man, before quickly leaving with the coach.

After watching a triumphant performance by Ramón in the bullring, Camilla tosses him her necklace, which emboldens him to visit her house that night and propose that they become a celebrity couple in order to enhance their earning power as performers. She is considering this, even though he insists she return the coach, when they are interrupted by word that there is a visitor. Camilla gets the jealous Ramón to let her go tell the Viceroy, who she is expecting, that she belongs to Ramón now, but, instead, she is met by Felipe. He tells her that he has come to take her to live a simple life among the natives, whom he came to admire while being held as their captive, and she agrees, even though she will not be able to bring the coach.

The Viceroy arrives, and Camilla leaves Felipe to tell him that she is leaving. When she learns the Viscount defied the nobles and expects the Bishop to approve their move to depose him, she feels guilty for playing a part in his downfall. Meanwhile, Felipe and Ramón find each other, and a sword fight ensues. They accidentally burst in on Camilla and the Viceroy, and, with everything now out in the open, Camilla tells all three men to go away. The Viceroy leaves, and Felipe and Ramón resume their duel outside, where they are arrested.

The next morning, the Bishop comes to the palace and announces that Camilla has given the coach to the Church, and he plans to use it to transport the last sacraments to the dying. The Viceroy keeps his position, and the Bishop calls for peace and reconciliation among the disputing parties.

The curtain falls, and, breaking the fourth wall, Don Antonio reminds Camilla that, as an actress, she is only able to realize her true self and find happiness when she is performing onstage. She inquires if Felipe, Ramón, and the Viceroy exist anymore, and Don Antonio says they do not. He asks if she misses them, to which she replies, "A little."

== Cast ==
The Troupe of Italian Actors
- Anna Magnani as Camilla
- Odoardo Spadaro as Don Antonio
- Nada Fiorelli as Isabella
- Dante as Harlequin

The Spanish Courtiers

- Duncan Lamont as The Viceroy
- George Higgins as Martinez, the Viceroy's confidential secretary
- Ralph Truman as The Duke
- Gisella Mathews as Marquise Ynez Altamirano
- Raf De La Torre as The Chief Justice
- Elena Altieri as The Duchess
- Cecil Mathews as Baron Adolfo, the Marquise's father (uncredited)
- Edward Febo Kelleng (or Fedo Keeling) as The Viscount (uncredited)
- Giulio Tedeschi as Balthazar, the Viscount's barber (uncredited)
- John Pasetti as The Captain of the Guard (uncredited)

The Others

- Paul Campbell as Felipe Aguirre
- Riccardo Rioli as Ramón, the bullfighter
- William Tubbs as The Innkeeper
- Jean Debucourt as The Bishop

== Production ==
The film was shot at Cinecittà in Rome, with cinematography by Claude Renoir. It was the first Italian film shot in Technicolor.

A French-Italian co-production, The Golden Coach was filmed in English. A simultaneous shoot in French was planned, but had to be abandoned due to financial problems. Renoir had his assistant director Marc Maurette direct the sessions to dub the finished film into French, and an Italian dub was also made. The French dub of the film was the first to appear in theaters, but Renoir repeatedly stated that he preferred the undubbed English-language version of the film, and that was the only one to be restored in 2012.

== Reception ==
In an essay included with the film's 2004 Criterion Collection DVD release, film critic Andrew Sarris wrote that "The Golden Coach was an international failure in all three language versions with both the critics and the public" at the time of its initial release, but that it is "Seen today by the international community of cinephiles as a truly 'beauteous' and 'ravishing' comic fantasy from Jean Renoir's late period".

In a 1954 review of the film in Sight and Sound, Tony Richardson was scathing about many elements of the film, criticizing its construction, narrative, presentation, dialogue, and acting (about which he said: "it ranges, with one exception, from the inadequate to the atrocious"), but he wrote that "the creative personality revealed by the film, for all its flaws, is so utterly charming. Visually the film (photographed by Claude Renoir) is breath-taking". Richardson also described the scene in which the comedians convert the courtyard of the inn into a theatre as "miraculous", writing: "It is an old man's vision smoothing away all difficulties of the wonder of artistic creation itself."

François Truffaut reportedly referred to The Golden Coach as "the noblest and most refined film ever made". Film critic Pauline Kael acknowledge that "it died at the box office" but says that she sat through it several times and still was unable to catch everything in it. Kael goes on to describe it as a wonderful blend of "color, wit, and Vivaldi".

Later, in 2002, the Society of Film Directors created a special award, the Carosse d'Or, which is always presented during the Directors' Fortnight at the Cannes Film Festival to a director of world cinema, chosen from among filmmakers from all over the world, "for the innovative qualities of his films, for his courage and intransigence in direction and production", in a tribute paid by the directors of the Society of Film Directors.

== Analysis ==
According to Sarris:

The Golden Coach can best be appreciated as an illustrious filmmaker's elegant tribute to the theater. The 'comedy' does not consist of laugh-provoking gags or expertly timed slapstick, but is based instead on a clear-eyed vision of art's denial of 'normal' life. Instead of seeking the nonexistent 'psychology' of the characters, one must follow the flowing images as a mobile painting driven by Magnani and Vivaldi across the canvas of an Italianate spectacle. Éric Rohmer has described The Golden Coach as 'the open sesame' of all Renoir's work. The two customary poles of his work—art and nature, acting and life—take shape in two facing mirrors, which reflect each other's images back and forth until it is impossible to tell where one ends and the other begins.
