= Number One (1973 film) =

1973 film by Gianni Buffardi

- Theatrical release poster
- Directed by: Gianni Buffardi
- Screenplay by: Sandro Continenza
- Story by: Gianni Buffardi
- Produced by: Gianni Buffardi
- Starring: Andrea Aureli; Chris Avram; Rita Calderoni; Isabelle de Valvert; Bruno Di Luia; Paolo di Tusco; Rina Franchetti; Claude Jade; Paolo Malco; Guido Mannari; Renzo Montagnani; Luigi Pistilli; Howard Ross; Massimo Serato; Renato Turi; Venantino Venantini
- Cinematography: Roberto D'Ettorre Piazzoli
- Edited by: Maurizio Mangosi
- Music by: Giancarlo Chiaramello
- Production company: Sant'Ignazio Cinematografica
- Distributed by: Dear International
- Release date: 28 May 1973
- Running time: 95 minutes
- Country: Italy
- Language: Italian

Number One is a 1973 Italian crime drama film directed by Gianni Buffardi and starring Renzo Montagnani, Luigi Pistilli, Claude Jade, Chris Avram, Guido Mannari and Massimo Serato. The film is loosely based on a real-life story detailing crime and drugs in the Rome underground. After the film quickly disappeared from public view in 1973 due to political censorship, it was restored in 2021 and had a theatrical re-release and world premiere on television.

== Plot ==
Benni, the owner of a photo agency, arrives. He welcomes Leo, the owner of the club, Sylvie Boisset, a French actress and model, Mino Cattani, the editor of the newspaper, Commenda and the lawyer. There is a lot of murmuring, and the editor of the newspaper receives a phone call. He is nervous and whispers to Leo and makes another phone call. Sylvie observes the men's interactions. At dawn in a villa in Rome: three men sit next to the body of the naked Deborah Garner. Her husband, Teddy Garner Jr, is comforted by his two friends: Massimo and Dino Pancati. Shortly after, the Doctor, arrives. He diagnoses the death and has Deborah taken away. Teddy immediately leaves Rome. Dino and Massimo go to the Capannelle, where they meet Pupo, the leader of a gang.

Inspector Vinci starts investigating the Deborah Garner case. He interrogates all the members of Garner's entourage. The Commendatore tells him that Garner is close to a royal family, the elderly Princess says nothing, the lawyer turns to an art dealer who is involved in the trade of stolen paintings, as well as to the director of a pawnshop who is also an accomplice. Now the case of the stolen paintings has to be investigated. Vinci now works together with the captain, the commander of the Carabinieri.

The commendatore elaborates a scam with the notary: he pretends to have bought some paintings from the legitimate owner, now deceased, a nobleman, which then ended up in Garner's house. He negotiates with the accountant. There he receives a call from Pupo, who has been ordered to punish a married couple who have taken out a loan with false cheques. The husband is beaten, the wife is forced to have sex and raped by Pupo.

Nobody shows up at Debora's funeral except Sylvie, who is identified by two policemen. Sylvie calls the Carabinieri and gives them a tip-off: there are paintings stolen from the convent of Monterenzo. The carabinieri, led by the captain, find the paintings in the Monterenzo monastery and arrested the prior. When Sylvie returns home, Inspector Vinci is already waiting outside the door of her flat and questions Sylvie's Neighbour. Sylvie runs away from the house. Sylvie is visited by Benni during the night, who makes a phone call to someone called Rudy. Sylvie finds the phone call suspicious in connection with Deborah's death, the death of an American nobleman and the theft of art.

Sylvie now goes to see Massimo, who lives with his wife Betsy, a model. Sylvie confides in Massimo and tells him that Benni received a phone call in his presence from the nobleman Rudy, who was involved in the theft of his uncle's painting and was in "Number One" during the theft so that the Commendatore would tear up some bills for his complicity in the theft. Later, the uncle is eliminated. Massimo confides to Sylvie how he, along with Dino, Pupo and other crooks, had taken the paintings to the monastery. Leo was also at the scene, Massimo reveals. Massimo tells Sylvie not to be too afraid of Benni because the real criminals and dangerous villains are Leo and the Commenda.

After the Captain interrogates the Commendatore, Sylvie enters his office. She is anxious and confides in him that she knows the true story of Deborah's death: In a flashback, narrated by Sylvie, we see Deborah's agony and death. She has taken the heroin and is rolling around naked ecstatically in agony on the bed, helpfully caressing herself with white foam in her mouth. Dino and Massimo advise Teddy not to save her, but to allow her inevitable death. Because the two had planned an expensive divorce. Since death takes a long time, the men play cards until Deborah is finally dead after a long agony. Because she is late, they bring the situation to Leo's attention. Leo turns to the editor and sends the three men a doctor he trusts, who ascertains Deborah's death. Sylvie tells the captain that she is worried about Massimo. She has not heard from him for four days, and he has disappeared. The captain thanks Sylvie and asks her to make herself available, because she can tip off the plot.

The captain arrests Dino at a poker club. The latter admits that the cocaine found in the Garner house belongs to him. He ends up in prison, where we see him as an altar boy. Massimo learns of Dino's arrest and is frightened. While having sex with Betsy, he tells her that a policeman showed up while he was carrying paintings on the beach at night. The policeman was first shot and then had his throat slit. Now he wants to escape to Switzerland with Betsy. He calls his friends and asks them for money. These friends tell him to come with Betsy to a lake, the Lake Martignano. Massimo and Betsy can't wait to get all the money. Massimo is doing a photo shoot with Betsy on the shore of the lake when the two are suddenly executed with many gunshots. Both are dead.

On the way, a car stops next to Sylvie. Pupo jumps out, hits Sylvie and drags her into the car. The car drives away at great speed. A short time later, Pupo and his gang are eliminated by a group of assassins. They had just learned that an autopsy had been ordered on Debora to determine the true cause of death. The Captain leads Benni to the morgue, where a female corpse is found. Benni says he can't recognise her as Sylvie. The Capitano says he will keep looking for Sylvie Boisset, because he is only interested in what happened to her. Benni gets nervous, makes a phone call and threatens the caller. A bomb explodes at Number One. Then a car explodes. It turns out to have been used to transport stolen paintings. Publisher Cattani's newspaper publishes an article on the death of Massimo and Betsy: double suicide. There are no more witnesses. The two investigators attend the exhumation and discover they have no evidence against anyone.

== Cast ==
- Renzo Montagnani as Vinci, police commissioner
- Luigi Pistilli as Carabinieri commander
- Claude Jade as Sylvie Boisset
- Chris Avram as Benny
- Guido Mannari as Massimo
- Venantino Venantini as Leo
- Paolo Malco as Teddy Garner Jr.
- Howard Ross as Dino Pancani
- Massimo Serato as Mino Cattani
- Renato Turi as Commenda
- Rina Franchetti as Principessa
- Isabelle de Valvert as Betsy
- Bruno Di Luia as Pupo
- Rita Calderoni as wife with false credit
- Andrea Scotti as husband with false credit
- Andrea Aureli as the doctor

== Production ==
Nicola Campigli, to whom his late father Massimo bequeathed a fortune in pictures in 1971, is the victim of an art theft. Since Campigli has frequented Rome's jet set at Club "Number One", he meets the son-in-law of comedian Totò, the young film producer Gianni Buffardi. After the thieves are discovered, Campigli and Buffardi do research in the nightclub and at police stations. With a dozen Italian starlets as well as some well-known Italian actors (Venantino Venantini, Luigi Pistilli, Renzo Montagnani), the Romanian Chris Avram and the French actress Claude Jade, the crime thriller Number One was created, which premiered on May 28, 1973.

In an uncredited extra appearance, Eleonora Giorgi is seen in her first film appearance. She is a blonde companion in the nightclub to Commenda, played by Renato Turi.

Since the film makes references to the then-current trials surrounding Number One and makes real people recognisable, such as the deaths of Talitha Getty and the Banda della Magliana (Magliana Gang), it was immediately withdrawn from circulation after the screening. It wasn't until 2021 that the film was restored by the Centro Sperimentale di Cinematografia and saw its re-release and world premiere on television.

=== Restoration ===
The film, whose main characters are pseudonyms of partly real representatives of the jet set in Rome in the 1970s, disappears from the public. The Centro Sperimentale di Cinematografia and the Cineteca Nazionale are reconstructing the film in collaboration with the television broadcaster Cine34. Roberto D'Ettore Piazzoli, the cameraman at the time, and Antonello Buffardi, the director's son, are also present. The film was shown again at the 39th Torino Film Festival in Turin in November 2021. The film will then have its television premiere on the broadcaster Cine34. Luca Pallanch from the Cineteca Nazionale said: “The good Roma, told a little earlier by Carlo Lizzani, and the bad Rome, painted by Gianni Buffardi, are two sides of the same coin that now not only offer cinephiles but also detectives in Italian history will."

Shortly after it was shown at the film festival, the film premiered on television on Italian Channel Cine 34 on 9 December 2021.
