= Escape from Galaxy 3 =

- Theatrical poster
- Directed by: Ben Norman
- Written by: John Thomas
- Produced by: Dino Mangogna
- Starring: Sherry Buchanan; Fausto Di Bella; Don Powell; Chris Avram; Attilio Dottesio; Max Turilli
- Cinematography: Sandro Mancori
- Edited by: Gianfranco Amicucci
- Music by: Don Powell
- Distributed by: Prism (USA)
- Release date: 12 February 1981
- Running time: 92 min.
- Countries: United States; Italy
- Language: English / Italian
- Budget: unknown

Escape from Galaxy 3 (original title "Giochi erotici nella terza galassia" also known as Starcrash II, Star Lovers, and Space Trap) is an Italian 1981 science fiction film. The film is notorious for using stock footage from Starcrash for all its model scenes, and the film is occasionally known as Starcrash II.

== Plot ==
In a distant galaxy, aboard a space station, Princess Belle Star approaches her father, King Ceylon, with her Space Captain, Lithan. She advises that their scanners have detected a ship that doesn't belong in their galaxy. The King declares that Oraclon, "The King of the Night", has come to take over his territories. Lithan suggests they put plan Epsilon into action.

Aboard his ship (which looks like a giant mechanical clawed fist), Oraclon communicates with Ceylon, who refuses to surrender. Oraclon launches his attack, destroying Ceylon's Space Station and the planet Exalon, but not before Ceylon sends Lithan and his daughter to obtain help from his ally Antares. Oraclon gives chase and manages to damage their ship, but they manage to elude his ships by going to hyperspace with no set coordinates.

They approach and land on a planet that looks like Earth. Their landing scares off the human population, who attack them with sticks and rocks. Lithan and Belle scare them off by shooting but not killing anybody. They are eventually captured by the primitives and are to be executed. Before they can be executed in a crater, a child slips and almost falls to her death until Lithan springs into action and saves the child - proving they mean the primitives no harm.

While Lithan and Belle Star are treated as honored guests, the village elder hints that they are the only survivors of an ancient ill-fated civilization. When Oraclon reaches the planet and thinks they've found a radiation signature for the ship, he states Earth destroyed itself in an atomic war long ago.

The ship is repaired, and Belle Star remarks that her father once told her that people who "taste the joys of life lose their gift of immortality" and may no longer be immortal. Following this, the Earthlings hold a festival where the winner chooses his mate. The winner selects Belle Star, making Lithan declare his love for her. They run off to the beach to make love when Oraclon attacks the village, prompting Lithan and Belle Star to leave, but the village elder refuses to let them and tries to force them to stay. Lithan and Belle Star overpower the villagers and escape.

During the long trek back to their galaxy, Lithan and Belle Star make love, which Oraclon is able to watch from his ship. With nowhere to go, they surrender to Oraclon. He takes them back to Exalon, which he exclaims is dead and lifeless. He declares he will spare them both, but Belle Star will be his slave forever, and Lithan will spend the rest of his life in forced labor. They say their final goodbyes, and in a moment of distraction, Lithan vaporizes Oraclon, kills the guards, and frees the kings who were taken prisoner. The kings return to their homeworlds, Lithan and Belle Star return to Earth to live their lives as mortals.

== Main cast ==
- Sherry Buchanan - Belle Star: Princess and daughter of King Ceylon. She is the sensual companion of Lithan who wants to experience the "joys" they witness on Earth and falls in love with Lithan.
- Fausto Di Bella - Lithan (as James Milton): Superpowered immortal Space Captain to Belle Star. Has no idea what water is or emotions. Eventually falls in love with Belle Star.
- Don Powell - Oraclon: The evil "King of the Night" who seeks to rule the whole galaxy, and seeks out the escaped Belle Star and Lithan.
- Chris Avram - King Ceylon (as Auran Cristea): The peaceful King of Exalon who refuses to surrender to Oraclon and is killed at the beginning of the movie.
- Attilio Dottesio - Village Elder: The villager who rallies together all the other villagers and reveals that they are the survivors of a long lost civilization.
- Max Turilli - Jemar: Oraclon's lackey. Usually makes reports or repeats Oraclon's commands to the rest of the ship.

== Reception ==
In Creature Feature, the movie received 1 out of 5 stars. It was noted to be chintzy, unconvincing, anemic and having silly sound effects. Allmovie agreed, calling the movie boring and broken down, similarly giving it a one star review. TV Guide had a similar view of the film. Brandon's Cult Movie Reviews finds the movie to be derivative in every way.
