= Carousel of Variety =

- Italian: Carosello del varietà
- Directed by: Aldo Bonaldi; Aldo Quinti
- Produced by: Aldo Bonaldi; Aldo Quinti
- Production company: Boqui Film
- Distributed by: Boqui Film
- Release date: 20 June 1955
- Running time: 98 minutes
- Country: Italy
- Language: Italian

Carousel of Variety (Italian: Carosello del varietà) is a 1955 Italian musical film directed by Aldo Bonaldi and Aldo Quinti and featuring a number of performers in a revue-style show.

== Partial cast ==
- Totò
- Anna Magnani
- Aldo Fabrizi
- Nino Taranto
- Erminio Macario
- Josephine Baker
- Odoardo Spadaro
- Wanda Osiris
- Ettore Petrolini
- Renato Rascel
- Gino Latilla
- Carlo Cascianelli
- Mistinguett
- Nicholas Brothers
- Conchita Montenegro

== Bibliography ==
- Dayna Oscherwitz & MaryEllen Higgins. The A to Z of French Cinema. Scarecrow Press, 2009.
