= Renato Turi =

Italian voice actor (1920–1991)

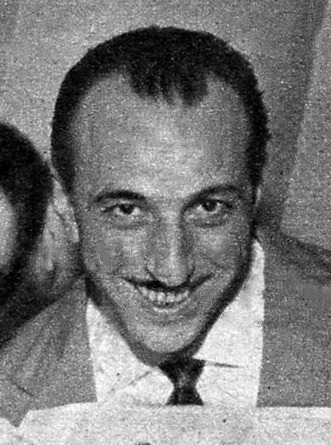
- Turi in 1958
- Born: 12 May 1920; Florence, Italy
- Died: 5 April 1991 (aged 70); Rome, Italy
- Occupations: Actor; voice actor; dubbing director
- Years active: 1946–1991
- Spouse: Clara Bartolomei
- Children: 2

Renato Turi (12 May 1920 – 5 April 1991) was an Italian actor and voice actor.

== Biography ==
Renato Turi was born in Florence to Umberto Turi, from Naples and Giulia Ragni, from Rome. He was considered to be an important figure in Italian dubbing. At an early age, Turi visited theatres across Italy with his parents before moving to Rome. He felt a great desire to perform on stage during those visits. During the outbreak of World War II, Turi served at the airport in Elmas, Sardinia which was bombarded by American forces, seriously injuring Turi resulting in his leg amputation. As a result, he had to give up his dreams as a theatre actor.

Nevertheless, Turi pursued an acting career in film, television and radio, acting in over six films and starring in many television productions. Despite his inability to make a stage appearance, he served as the voice of God in the 1973 musical comedy Aggiungi un posto a tavola. His voice was then re-recorded for later performances even after his death.

Turi was more successful as a voice dubber. He was the founder of the dubbing society SEDIF and he frequently collaborated with other dubbers including Giuseppe Rinaldi, Wanda Tettoni, Oreste Lionello, Gianfranco Bellini and Emilio Cigoli. Turi often provided the Italian voices of Walter Matthau, Lee Marvin, Christopher Lee, Telly Savalas, Lee Van Cleef, John Carradine, Lionel Jeffries, Charlton Heston, Sidney Poitier, Livio Lorenzon and Arthur Kennedy in most of their movies. In his animated roles, Turi voiced Jasper in the Italian version of One Hundred and One Dalmatians as well as Edgar in the Italian version of The Aristocats.

== Death ==
Turi died in Rome on 5 April 1991, at the age of 70. He was laid to rest in the Campo Verano. Turi's family members were given important positions within the dubbing company which he founded.

== Filmography ==
=== Cinema ===
- Garibaldi (1961) - Narrator, Voice
- Hercules in the Haunted World (1961) - Voice, Uncredited
- The Night of the Devils (1972) - Il Detective In Pensione - Uncredited
- Number One (1973)
- L'assassinio dei fratelli Rosselli (1974)
- Illustrious Corpses (1976) - Television anchorman
- Evelina e i suoi figli (1990) - Final film role

== Dubbing roles ==
=== Animation ===
- Jasper in One Hundred and One Dalmatians
- Edgar in The Aristocats
- Policeman in Lady and the Tramp
- Thomas Jefferson in Ben and Me
- Lemuel Gulliver in Gulliver's Travels
- King Amo in Alakazam the Great
- Julius Caesar in Asterix and Cleopatra

=== Live action ===
- Felix Anders in Strangers When We Meet
- Tony Gagouts in Who's Got the Action?
- Carson Dyle in Charade
- Professor Groeteschele in Fail Safe
- Ted Caselle in Mirage
- Whiplash Willie Gingrich in The Fortune Cookie
- Oscar Madison in The Odd Couple
- Horace Vandergelder in Hello, Dolly!
- Charley Varrick in Charley Varrick
- Jack Martin in The Laughing Policeman
- Zachary Garber in The Taking of Pelham One Two Three
- Willy Clark in The Sunshine Boys
- Marvin Michaels in California Suite
- Sorrowful Jones in Little Miss Marker
- Miles Kendig in Hopscotch
- Trabucco in Buddy Buddy
- Thomas Bartholomew Red in Pirates
- Father Maurice in The Little Devil
- Brundage in Not as a Stranger
- Lloyd Carracart in Pillars of the Sky
- John R. Miller in The Rack
- Orville "Flash" Perkins in Raintree County
- Charlie Strom in The Killers
- John Reisman in The Dirty Dozen
- Walker in Point Blank
- Paul Ryker in Sergeant Ryker
- American Pilot in Hell in the Pacific
- Ben Rumson in Paint Your Wagon
- Harry Wargrave in Avalanche Express
- Nick Alexander in The Delta Force
- Count Dracula in Dracula
- Count Dracula in One More Time
- Franklyn Marsh in Dr. Terror's House of Horrors
- Mr. U.N. Owen in Ten Little Indians
- Ship's vampire in The Magic Christian
- Count De Rochefort in The Four Musketeers: Milady's Revenge
- Cardinale Spinosi in The Miser
- Dirk Hanley in The Lawless Breed
- Crew Boss in Arrow in the Dust
- Al Drucker in Ten Wanted Men
- Ed Bailey in Gunfight at the O.K. Corral
- Ed McGaffey in The Tin Star
- First Sergeant Rickett in The Young Lions
- Jonathan Corbett in The Big Gundown
- Sabata in Sabata
- Sabata in Return of Sabata
- Jaroo in El Condor
- Travis in Barquero
- Captain Apache in Captain Apache
- Dakota in The Stranger and the Gunfighter
- Father John / Lewis in God's Gun
- China in Code Name: Wild Geese
- Igor in Goliath and the Barbarians
- Jimmy Jesse in The Sheriff
- Count Fosco Di Vallebruna in Knight of 100 Faces
- Kovo in Fury of the Pagans
- Sergeant Rodriguez in The Secret of the Black Falcon
- King Zagro in The Vengeance of Ursus
- Court Prefect in Messalina vs. the Son of Hercules
- Salmanassar in Hercules and the Tyrants of Babylon
- Lash in Buckaroo: The Winchester Does Not Forgive
- Artemio Di Giovanni in Torture Me But Kill Me with Kisses
- Ziby Fletcher in The Kentuckian
- Aaron in The Ten Commandments
- Stamp Proctor in Around the World in 80 Days
- Amos Force in The Last Hurrah
- Cassius Starbuckle in The Man Who Shot Liberty Valance
- Dr. Bernardo in Everything You Always Wanted to Know About Sex* (*But Were Afraid to Ask)
- George Taylor in Planet of the Apes
- Will Penny in Will Penny
- Stewart Graff in Earthquake
- Matthew Garth in Midway
- Charlie Sievers in Cape Fear
- Joe Coburn in The Slender Thread
- Jim Howie in The Scalphunters
- Ernst Stavro Blofeld in On Her Majesty's Secret Service
- Grandpa Potts in Chitty Chitty Bang Bang
- Solicitor in Lola
- Andrew Robertson in Red Ball Express
- Gregory Miller in Blackboard Jungle
- Tommy Tyler in Edge of the City
- Kimani Wa Karanja in Something of Value
- Gordon Ralfe in A Patch of Blue
- Hondo in Apache
- John Strock in Master of the World
- Paul Kersey in Death Wish II
- Tom Moore in Roots
- Orson in Mork & Mindy (seasons 1–2)
- Alan-a-Dale in The Story of Robin Hood and His Merrie Men
- Young Bull in Winchester '73
- Judge in Five Dolls for an August Moon
- Nick Molise in Totò lascia o raddoppia?
