= The Killer Reserved Nine Seats =

- Directed by: Giuseppe Bennati
- Screenplay by: Biagio Proietti; Paolo Levi; Giuseppe Bennati
- Starring: Rosanna Schiaffino; Chris Avram; Eva Czemerys
- Cinematography: Giuseppe Aquari
- Edited by: Luciano Anconetani
- Music by: Carlo Savina
- Production company: Cinenove
- Distributed by: Overseas Film Company
- Release date: 21 May 1974 (Italy)
- Running time: 104 minutes
- Country: Italy
- Box office: ₤427.544 million

The Killer Reserved Nine Seats (Italian: L'assassino ha riservato nove poltrone) is a 1974 Italian giallo film directed by Giuseppe Bennati.

== Plot ==
Patrick Davenant invites a group of friends to visit a theatre inside his villa, a place which later reveals itself as sinister. Within a short time, the guests realise that they are trapped in the villa. A merciless killer then begins to murder them one by one.

== Cast ==
- Rosanna Schiaffino as Vivian
- Chris Avram as Patrick Davenant
- Eva Czemerys as Rebecca Davenant
- Lucretia Love as Doris
- Paola Senatore as Lynn Davenant
- Gaetano Russo as Duncan Foster
- Andrea Scotti as Albert
- Eduardo Filippone as Mystery Man
- Antonio Guerra as Caretaker
- Howard Ross as Russell
- Janet Agren as Kim

== Release ==
The Killer Reserved Nine Seats was distributed by Overseas Film Company theatrically in Italy on 21 May 1974. The film grossed 427,544,000 Italian lira domestically in Italy.
