= Chris Avram =

Romanian-Italian film actor (1931–1989)

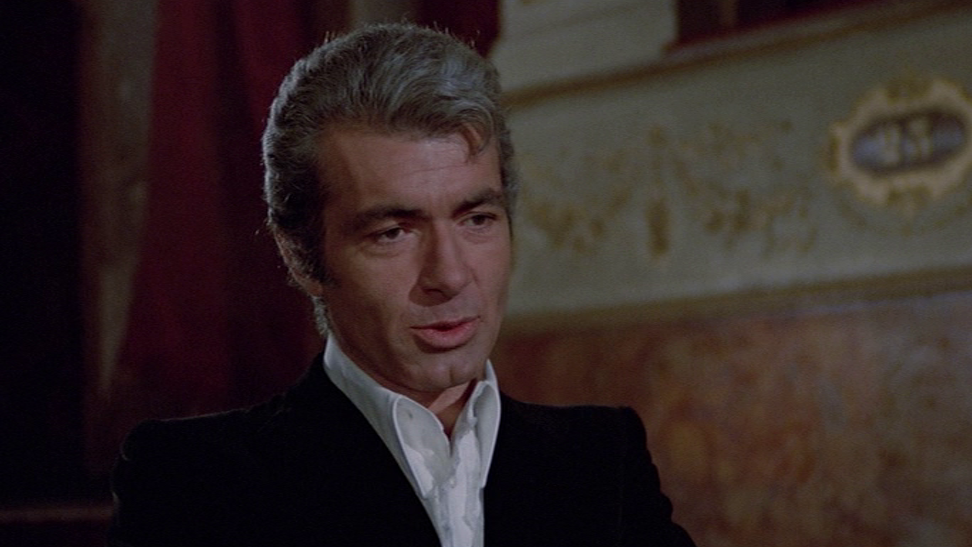
Chris Avram in The Killer Reserved Nine Seats

Chris Avram (born Cristea Avram; 31 August 1931 – 10 January 1989) was a Romanian-Italian film actor.

== Early life and career ==
Avram was born in Bucharest, into a family of active communists (his father being a member of the Romanian Communist Party while it was still banned, and his brother, Puiu, a Communist activist). In his youth, he attended a military school, after which he studied law for two years at the University of Bucharest, before being admitted to the Academy of Theatrical Arts and Cinematography. After graduation, he worked for a while as a theater actor in Timișoara, before joining the Nottara Theater in Bucharest. At a film festival in Moscow, he befriended Marina Vlady, who later went to Romania to star in Mona, l'étoile sans nom, directed by Henri Colpi. With her help, he managed to flee to Paris in 1966, where he remained. Later he settled in Rome, Italy, where he died of cancer.

He was married for a while to Romanian actress Olga Tudorache, with whom he had a son, Alexandru.

== Partial filmography ==
- Darclee (1959) − Eugenio Giraldoni
- Nu vreau să mă însor (1960) − the engineer Preda
- Poveste sentimentală (1960)
- Anotimpuri (1963)
- The White Moor (1965) − Spânul
- Mona, l'étoile sans nom (1966) − Grig
- Zodia Fecioarei (1966) − Lut (as Cristea Avram)
- Mamaia (1967) − Ștefan
- Manon 70 (1968)
- Le temps de vivre (1969) − Michel Casno
- Delitto al circolo del tennis (1969) − Riccardo Dossi
- Summer Affair (1971) − Father
- A Bay of Blood (1971) (aka Twitch of the Death Nerve) – Franco Ventura / Frank Ventura
- W Django! (1971) − Capitano Gomez
- Variety (1971) − Arturo Robles
- I senza Dio (1972) − Sam, detto 'Minnesota Killer'
- So Sweet, So Dead (1972) − Professor Casali
- Holy God, Here Comes the Passatore! (1973) − Zambelli
- Cuore (1973)
- Number One (1973)
- The Violent Professionals (1973) − DelBuono
- Servo suo (1973)
- I figli di nessuno (1974) − Anselmo Vannini
- El amor empieza a medianoche (1974) − Andrés
- The Killer Reserved Nine Seats (1974) − Patrick Davenant
- Il giudice e la minorenne (1974) − Marco Serra
- The Eerie Midnight Horror Show (1974) (aka The Sexorcist) − Mario
- Il pavone nero (1975) − Marco / marito−husband
- Sfida sul fondo (1976) − Prof. John
- Emanuelle in Bangkok (1976) − Thomas Quizet
- Stangata in famiglia (1976) − Esposito
- La malavita attacca... la polizia risponde! (1977) − Prof. Salviati − 'll Principe'
- California (1977) − Nelson
- La profezia (1978) − Andrea
- Il commissario Verrazzano (1978) − Marco Verelli
- The Iron Commissioner (1978) − Crivelli
- L'étrange monsieur Duvallier (1979, TV Series) − Della Pietra
- Star Odyssey (1980) − Shawn
- La ripetente fa l'occhietto al preside (1980) − Lino Pastorelli
- Giochi erotici nella 3a galassia (1981) − Ceylon
- Teste di quoio (1981)
- Sogni mostruosamente proibiti (1982)
- Vai avanti tu che mi vien da ridere (1982) − lo sceicco Abadjan
- Lo studente (1983) − Il barone Mario di Villalba (final film role)
