= Musoduro =

1953 film by Giuseppe Bennati

- Directed by: Giuseppe Bennati
- Written by: Giuseppe Bennati; Fausto Tozzi; Luigi Ugolini (novel)
- Starring: Fausto Tozzi; Marina Vlady; Cosetta Greco
- Cinematography: Mario Damicelli
- Music by: Nino Rota
- Production company: Mambretti Film
- Distributed by: Diana Cinematografica
- Release date: 9 December 1953
- Running time: 92 minutes
- Countries: France; Italy
- Language: Italian

Musoduro is a 1953 French-Italian drama film directed by Giuseppe Bennati and starring Fausto Tozzi, Marina Vlady and Cosetta Greco.

== Cast ==
- Fausto Tozzi as Marco / Musoduro
- Marina Vlady as Lucia Giardano
- Cosetta Greco as Anita
- Gérard Landry as Romolo
- Odoardo Spadaro as Pinzi, venditore ambulante
- Giulio Calì as Rospo
- José Jaspe as Carabinieri
- Alessandro Fersen as Dott. Biondi
- Gianni Cavalieri as Il sacerdote
- Dante Nello Carapelli as Giordono

== Bibliography ==
- Goble, Alan. The Complete Index to Literary Sources in Film. Walter de Gruyter, 1999.
