= Giuseppe Bennati =

Italian film director and writer (1921-2006)

Giuseppe Bennati (4 January 1921 – 26 September 2006) was an Italian film director and writer.

He directed Il microfono è vostro (1952), Musoduro (1954), L'amico del giaguaro (1958), Labbra rosse (1960), Congo vivo (1961) and L'assassino ha riservato nove poltrone (1974), his last movie. For RAI in 1970 he directed TV-movie BattleToads (Italo Calvino's bestseller) with Nanni Loy.

He died in Milan, Italy, aged 85 from undisclosed causes.

== Selected filmography ==
- Il microfono è vostro (1952)
- Musoduro (1953)
- The Friend of the Jaguar (1959)
- Labbra rosse (1960)
- Congo vivo (1961)
- L'assassino ha riservato nove poltrone (1974)
