= Anna Magnani =

Italian actress (1908–1973)

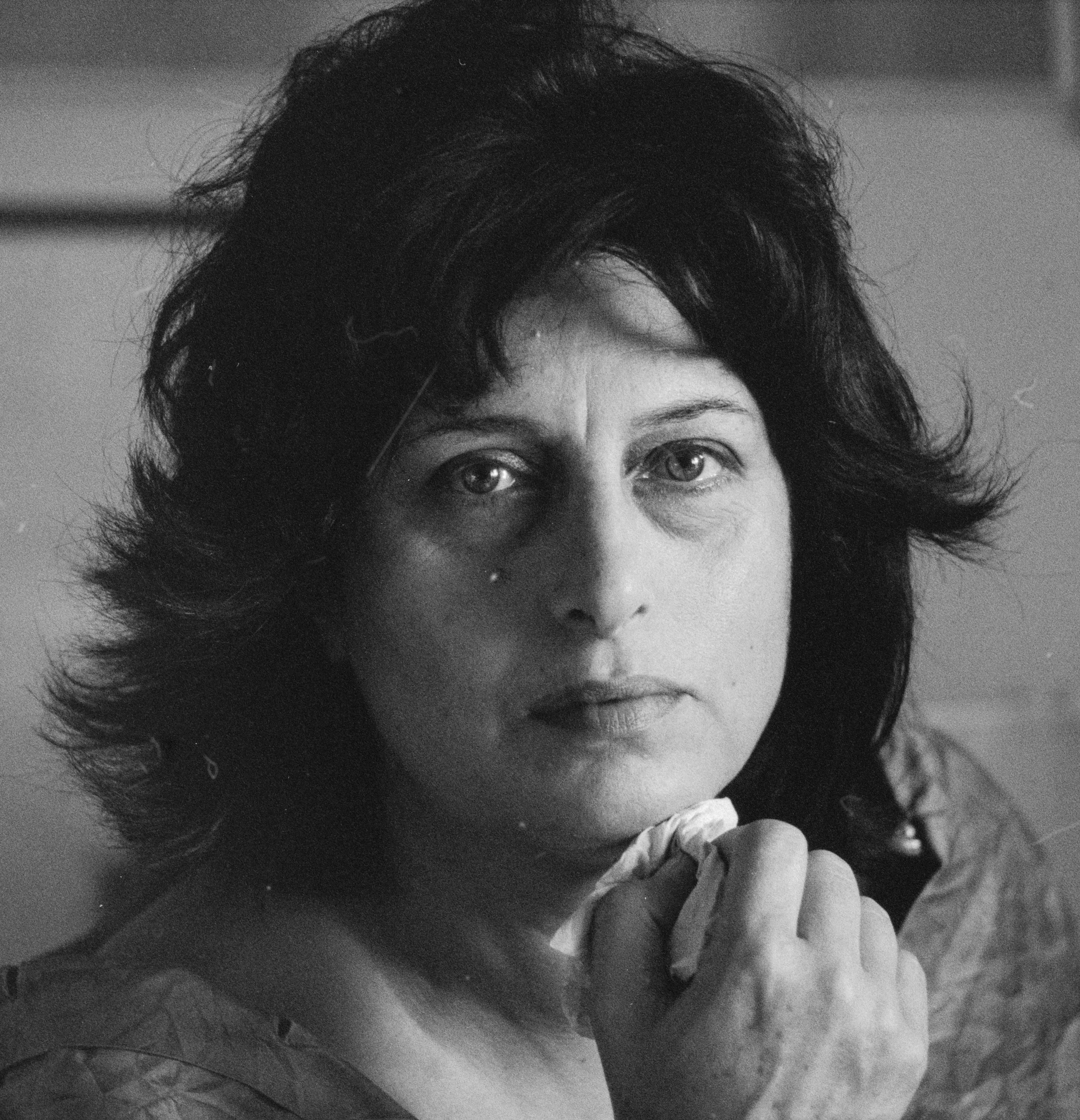
- Magnani in 1961
- Born: Anna Maria Magnani; 7 March 1908; Rome, Kingdom of Italy
- Died: 26 September 1973 (aged 65); Rome, Italy
- Occupation: Actress
- Years active: 1928–1972
- Spouse: Goffredo Alessandrini (m. 1935; div. 1950)
- Children: 1

Anna Maria Magnani (Italian: [ˈanna maɲˈɲaːni]; 7 March 1908 – 26 September 1973) was an Italian actress. She was the first Italian woman to win an Academy Award.

Born and raised in Rome, Italy or Alexandria, she worked her way through Rome's Academy of Dramatic Art by singing at night clubs. During her career, her only child was stricken by polio when he was 18 months old and remained disabled. She was referred to as "La Lupa", the "perennial toast of Rome" and a "living she-wolf symbol" of the cinema. Time described her personality as "fiery", and drama critic Harold Clurman said her acting was "volcanic". In the realm of Italian cinema, she was "passionate, fearless, and exciting", an actress whom film historian Barry Monush calls "the volcanic earth mother of all Italian cinema." Director Roberto Rossellini called her "the greatest acting genius since Eleonora Duse". Playwright Tennessee Williams became an admirer of her acting and wrote The Rose Tattoo (1955) specifically for her to star in, a role for which she received an Academy Award for Best Actress.

After meeting director Goffredo Alessandrini, she received her first screen role in The Blind Woman of Sorrento (La cieca di Sorrento, 1934) and later achieved international attention in Rossellini's Rome, Open City (1945), which is seen as launching the Italian neorealism movement in cinema. As an actress, she became recognized for her dynamic and forceful portrayals of "earthy lower-class women" in such films as L'Amore (1948), Bellissima (1951), The Rose Tattoo (1955), The Fugitive Kind (1960) and Mamma Roma (1962). As early as 1950, Life had already stated that Magnani was "one of the most impressive actresses since Garbo".

== Early years ==
Acting on stage as Anna Christie with Mario Besesti, 1939

Magnani's parentage and birthplace are uncertain. Some sources suggest she was born in Rome, others suggest Egypt. Her mother was Marina Magnani. Film director Franco Zeffirelli, who claimed to know Magnani well, states in his autobiography that she was born in Alexandria, Egypt, to an Italian-Jewish mother and Egyptian father, and that "only later did she become Roman when her grandmother brought her over and raised her in one of the Roman slum districts." Magnani herself stated that her mother was married in Egypt, but returned to Rome before giving birth to her at Porta Pia, and did not know how the rumor of her Egyptian birth got started. She was enrolled in a French convent school in Rome, where she learned to speak French and play the piano. She also developed a passion for acting from watching the nuns stage their Christmas plays. This period of formal education lasted until the age of 14.

She was a "plain, frail child with a forlornness of spirit". Her grandparents compensated by pampering her with food and clothes. Yet while growing up, she is said to have felt more at ease around "more earthly" companions, often befriending the "toughest kid on the block". This trait carried over into her adult life when she proclaimed, "I hate respectability. Give me the life of the streets, of common people."

At age 17, she went on to study at the Eleonora Duse Royal Academy of Dramatic Art in Rome for two years. To support herself, Magnani sang in nightclubs and cabarets; leading to her being dubbed "the Italian Édith Piaf". However, her actor friend Micky Knox writes that she "never studied acting formally" and started her career in Italian music halls singing traditional Roman folk songs. "She was instinctive" he writes. "She had the ability to call up emotions at will, to move an audience, to convince them that life on the stage was as real and natural as life in their own kitchen." Film critic David Thomson wrote that Magnani was considered an "outstanding theatre actress" in productions of Anna Christie and The Petrified Forest.

== Early acting career ==
In 1933, Magnani was acting in experimental plays in Rome when she was discovered by Italian filmmaker Goffredo Alessandrini. The couple married the same year. Nunzio Malasomma directed her in her first major film role in The Blind Woman of Sorrento (La Cieca di Sorrento, 1934). Goffredo Alessandrini directed her in Cavalry (Cavalleria, 1936). For director Vittorio De Sica, Magnani starred in Teresa Venerdì (1941). De Sica called this Magnani's "first true film". In it, she plays Loletta Prima, the girlfriend of De Sica's character, Pietro Vignali. De Sica described Magnani's laugh as "loud, overwhelming, and tragic".

== Italian stardom ==
Magnani became a major star in post-War Italian cinema, coming to international prominence in the films of Roberto Rossellini and other Italian directors.

=== Rome, Open City (1945) ===
Magnani gained international renown as Pina in Roberto Rossellini's neorealist Rome, Open City (Roma, città aperta, 1945). In a film about Italy's final days under German occupation during World War II, Magnani's character dies fighting to protect her husband, an underground fighter against the Nazis.

=== L'Amore: The Human Voice and The Miracle (1948) ===
Other collaborations with Rossellini include L'Amore (1948), a two-part film which includes The Miracle and The Human Voice (Il miracolo, and Una voce umana). In the former, Magnani, playing a peasant outcast who believes the baby she is carrying is Christ, plumbs both the sorrow and the righteousness of being alone in the world. The latter film is based on Jean Cocteau's play about a woman desperately trying to salvage a relationship over the telephone.

=== Volcano (1950) ===
After The Miracle, Rossellini promised to direct Magnani in a film he was preparing, which he told her would be "the crowning vehicle of her career". However, when the screenplay was completed, he instead gave the role for Stromboli to Ingrid Bergman, later Rossellini's lover. This permanently ended Magnani's personal and professional association with Rossellini.

As a result, Magnani took on the starring role of Volcano (1950), which was said to have been produced to invite a comparison. Both films were shot in similar locales of Aeolian Islands, only 40 kilometres apart; both actresses played independent-minded roles in a neorealist fashion; and both films were shot simultaneously. Life wrote "in an atmosphere crackling with rivalry... Reporters were accredited, like war correspondents, to one or the other of the embattled camps...Partisanship infected the Via Veneto (boulevard in Rome), where Magnaniacs and Bergmaniacs clashed frequently." However, Magnani still considered Rossellini the "greatest director she ever acted for".

=== Bellissima (1951) ===
With director Luchino Visconti on the terrace of Palazzo Altieri, where Magnani lived in the 1950s

In Luchino Visconti's Bellissima (1951), she plays Maddalena, a blustery, obstinate stage mother who drags her daughter to Cinecittà for the 'Prettiest Girl in Rome' contest, with dreams that her plain daughter will be a star. Her emotions in the film went from those of rage and humiliation to maternal love.

=== The Golden Coach (1952) ===
Magnani then went on to star as Camille (stage name: Columbine) in Jean Renoir's film The Golden Coach (Le Carrosse d'or, 1952). She played a woman torn with desire for three men - a soldier, a bullfighter, and a viceroy. Renoir called her "the greatest actress I have ever worked with".

Art critic of the time, Pauline Kael, says that The Golden Coach was Magnani's greatest screen performance.

== American films ==
=== The Rose Tattoo (1955) ===
She played the widowed mother of a teenaged daughter in Daniel Mann's 1955 film, The Rose Tattoo, based on the play by Tennessee Williams. It co-starred Burt Lancaster, and was Magnani's first English-speaking role in a mainstream Hollywood movie, winning her the Academy Award for Best Actress. Lancaster, who played the role of a "lusty truck driver", said, "if she had not found acting as an outlet for her enormous vitality, she would have become a great criminal".

Film historian John DiLeo has written that Magnani's acting in the film "displays why she is inarguably one of the half dozen greatest screen actresses of all time", and added:

"Whenever Magnani laughs or cries (which is often), it's as if you've never seen anyone laugh or cry before: has laughter ever been so burstingly joyful or tears so shatteringly sad?

Tennessee Williams wrote the screenplay and based the character of Serafina on Magnani as Williams was a great admirer of her acting abilities, and he even stipulated that the movie "must star what Time described as "the most explosive emotional actress of her generation, Anna Magnani." In his Memoirs, Williams described why he insisted on Magnani playing this role:

"Anna Magnani was magnificent as Serafina in the movie version of Tattoo...She was as unconventional a woman as I have known in or out of my professional world, and if you understand me at all, you must know that in this statement I am making my personal estimate of her honesty, which I feel was complete. She never exhibited any lack of self-assurance, any timidity in her relations with that society outside of whose conventions she quite publicly existed...[s]he looked absolutely straight into the eyes of whomever she confronted and during that golden time in which we were dear friends, I never heard a false word from her mouth."

It was originally staged on Broadway with Maureen Stapleton, as Magnani's English was too limited at the time for her to star. Magnani won other Best Actress awards for her role, including the BAFTA Film Award, Golden Globes Award, National Board of Review, USA, and the New York Film Critics Circle Awards. When her name was announced as the Oscar winner, an American journalist called her in Rome to tell her the news; he had difficulty convincing her he was serious.

=== Wild is the Wind ===
Magnani worked again in the United States, speaking both English and Italian, in George Cukor's drama Wild Is the Wind (1957), in which she played the Italian bride of sheep farmer Anthony Quinn who falls for his surrogate son Tony Franciosa. Both Magnani and Quinn were nominated for Oscars for their performances.

Magnani and Quinn would later star in the less successful The Secret of Santa Vittoria (1969).

=== The Fugitive Kind ===
She then appeared in another Tennessee Williams property, the 1960 film The Fugitive Kind, which originally was titled Orpheus Descending after the play on which it was based). Directed by Sidney Lumet, she co-starred with Marlon Brando, for whom this also was a reunion with Williams, whose A Streetcar Named Desire vaulted him to stardom. In the film, she played Lady Torrance, a woman "hardened by life's cruelties and a grief that will not fade." It also co-starred a young Joanne Woodward in one of her early roles.

In an article he wrote for Life, Williams discussed why he chose Magnani for the part:

"Anna and I had both cherished the dream that her appearance in the part I created for her in The Fugitive Kind would be her greatest triumph to date...She is simply a rare being who seems to have about her a little lightning-shot cloud all her own...In a crowded room, she can sit perfectly motionless and silent and still you feel the atmospheric tension of her presence, its quiver and hum in the air like a live wire exposed, and a mood of Anna's is like the presence of royalty."

The production was troubled, as Magnani and Brando did not get along. David Thomson has written:

Rumors had it that Magnani (fifty-one at the time) assumed in advance that there would be a sexual encounter with Brando (thirty-six), and when that failed to materialize, she became aggressive and insecure; and that Brando believed she refrained from washing to goad him.

The movie received mixed reviews and was a failure at the box office.

== Other Italian films ==
Magnani continued to work in Italian movies. ...And the Wild Wild Women (Nella Città L'Inferno, 1958) paired her as an unrepentant streetwalker with Giulietta Masina, Federico Fellini's wife and star, in a women-in-prison film.

=== Mamma Roma (1962) ===
In Pier Paolo Pasolini's Mamma Roma (1962), Magnani is both the mother and the whore, playing an irrepressible prostitute determined to give her teenaged son a respectable middle-class life. Mamma Roma, while one of Magnani's critically acclaimed films, was not released in the United States until 1995, deemed too controversial 33 years earlier. By now, she was frustrated at being typecast in the roles of poor women. Magnani in 1963 commented, "I'm bored stiff with these everlasting parts as a hysterical, loud, working-class woman".

=== The Secret of Santa Vittoria (1969) ===
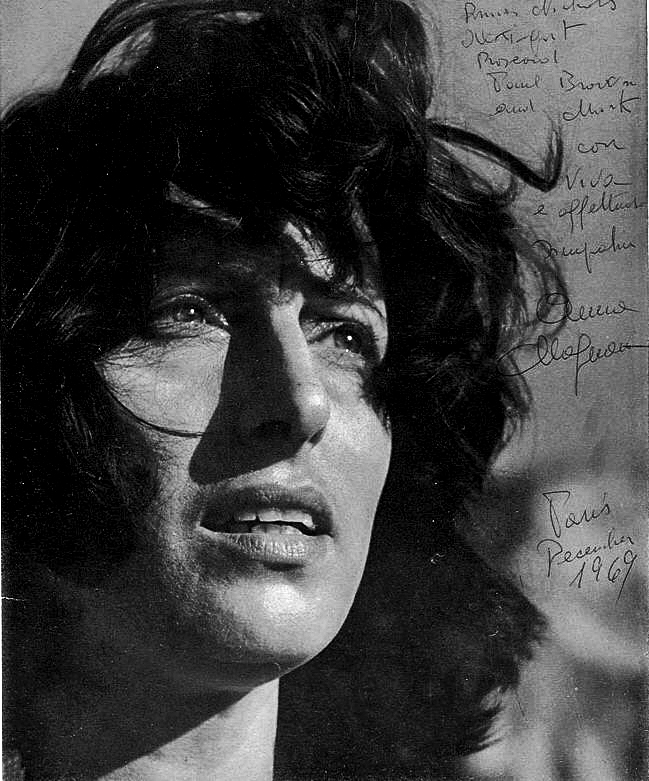
Autographed photo, 1969

In one of her last film roles, The Secret of Santa Vittoria (1969), she co-starred with Anthony Quinn, with whom she had appeared with a decade before in Wild is the Wind. They played husband and wife in what Life called "perhaps the most memorable fight since Jimmy Cagney smashed Mae Clarke in the face with a half a grapefruit."

In real life as well as in their reel life, Magnani and Quinn feuded in private outside view of the cameras, and their animosity spilled over into their scenes:

"By the time the movie makers were ready to shoot the fight scene, the stars were ready, too. Magnani not only went for Quinn with the pasta and with a rolling pin, but [also] with her foot; she kicked so hard she broke a bone in her right foot. She also bit him in the neck. 'That's not in the script', Quinn protested. Magnani snarled, 'I'm supposed to win this fight, remember?"

=== Fellini's Roma (1972) ===
She later played herself (within a dramatic context) in Federico Fellini's Roma (1972). Towards the end of her career, Magnani was quoted as having said, "The day has gone when I deluded myself that making movies was art. Movies today are made up of…intellectuals who always make out that they're teaching something".

== Acting style ==
According to film critic Robin Wood, Magnani's "persona as a great actress is built, not on transformation, but on emotional authenticity... [she] doesn't portray characters but expresses 'genuine' emotions." Her style does not display the more obvious attributes of the female star, with neither her face or physical makeup being considered "beautiful", wrote Wood. However, she possesses a "remarkably expressive face," and for American audiences, at least, she represents "what Hollywood had consistently failed to produce: 'reality'". She was the atypical star, the "nonglamorous human being", as her genuine style of acting became a "rejection of glamour".

Her most distinguished work in Hollywood is in Wild Is the Wind, according to Wood. Directed by George Cukor, "the American cinema's greatest director of actresses," he was able to draw out the "individual essence" of Magnani's "sensitive and inward performance."

== Personal life ==
During Benito Mussolini's rule, Magnani was known to make jokes about the Italian Fascist Party.

Visiting her polio-stricken son Luca at a sanatorium, c. 1947

She married Goffredo Alessandrini, her first film director, in 1935, two years after he discovered her on stage. After they married, she retired from full-time acting to "devote herself exclusively to her husband", although she continued to play smaller film parts. They separated in 1942.

Magnani had a love affair with actor Massimo Serato, by whom she had her only child, a son named Luca, who was born on 29 October 1942 in Rome, after her separation from Alessandrini. At the age of 18 months, Luca contracted polio and subsequently lost the use of his legs due to paralysis. As a result, Magnani spent most of her early earnings for specialists and hospitals. After once seeing a legless war veteran drag himself along the sidewalk, she said, "I realize now that it's worse when they grow up", and resolved to earn enough to "shield him forever from want".

In 1945, she fell in love with director Roberto Rossellini while working on Roma, Città Aperta (Rome, Open City). "I thought at last I had found the ideal man... [He] had lost a son of his own and I felt we understood each other. Above all, we had the same artistic conceptions." Rossellini could be violent, volatile and possessive, however, and they would argue about films or out of jealousy. "In fits of rage they threw crockery at each other." As artists, though, they complemented each other well while working on neorealist films. The two split up when Rossellini had an affair with Ingrid Bergman, whom he married after she conceived a child.

Magnani was mystically inclined and consulted astrologers, as well as believing in numerology. She also claimed to be clairvoyant. She ate and drank very little and could subsist for long periods on nothing more than black coffee and cigarettes. However, these habits often affected her sleep: "My nights are appalling," she said. "I wake up in a state of nerves and it takes me hours to get back in touch with reality."

== Death ==
On 26 September 1973, Magnani died at the age of 65 in Rome from pancreatic cancer. Huge crowds gathered for the funeral. She was provisionally laid to rest in the family mausoleum of Roberto Rossellini; but then subsequently interred in the Cimitero Comunale of San Felice Circeo in southern Lazio.

== Filmography and awards ==
Year	Title	Role	Notes
1928	Scampolo		
1934	La cieca di Sorrento (The Blind Woman of Sorrento)	Anna, la sua amante	
1934	Tempo massimo	Emilia	
1935	Quei due (Those Two)		
1936	Cavalleria (Cavalry)	Fanny	
1936	Trenta secondi d'amore (Thirty Seconds of Love)		
1938	La principessa Tarakanova (Princess Tarakanova)	Marietta, la cameriera	
1940	Una lampada all finestra	Ivana, l'amante di Max	
1941	Teresa Venerdì	Maddalena Tentini/Loretta Prima	
1941	La fuggitiva	Wanda Reni	
1942	La fortuna viene dal cielo	Zizì	
1942	Finalmente soli (Alone at Last)	Ninetta alias "Lulù"	
1943	L'ultima carrozzella (The Last Wagon)	Mary Dunchetti, la canzonettista	
1943	Gli assi della risata		segment "Il mio pallone"
1943	Campo de' fiori (The Peddler and the Lady)	Elide	
1943	La vita è bella (Life Is Beautiful)	Virginia	
1943	L'avventura di Annabella (Annabella's Adventure)	La mondana	
1944	Il fiore sotto gli occhi	Maria Comasco, l'attrice	
1945	Abbasso la miseria! (Down with Misery)	Nannina Straselli	
1945	Roma città aperta (Rome, Open City)	Pina	National Board of Review Award for Best Actress; Nastro d'Argento for Best Supporting Actress
1945	Quartetto pazzo	Elena	
1946	Abbasso la ricchezza! (Peddlin' in Society)	Gioconda Perfetti	
1946	Il bandito (The Bandit)	Lidia	
1946	Avanti a lui tremava tutta Roma (Before Him All Rome Trembled)	Ada	
1946	Lo sconosciuto di San Marino (Unknown Men of San Marino)	Liana, the prostitute	
1946	Un uomo ritorna	Adele	
1947	L'onorevole Angelina	Angelina Bianchi	Nastro d'Argento for Best Actress; Volpi Cup
1948	Assunta Spina	Assunta Spina	
1948	L'amore	The Woman*/Nanni**	* in segment "Una voce umana"/** in segment "Il miracolo"; Nastro d'Argento for Best Actress
1948	Molti sogni per le strade	Linda	
1950	Volcano	Maddalena Natoli	
1951	Bellissima	Maddalena Cecconi	Nastro d'Argento for Best Actress
1952	Camicie rosse (Red Shirts)	Anita Garibaldi	
1953	Le Carrosse d'or (The Golden Coach)	Camilla	
1955	The Rose Tattoo	Serafina Delle Rose	Academy Award for Best Actress; BAFTA Award for Best Actress in a Leading Role; Golden Globe Award for Best Actress - Motion Picture Drama; National Board of Review Award for Best Actress; New York Film Critics Circle Award for Best Actress
1955	Carosello del varietà (Carousel of Variety)		
1957	Wild Is the Wind	Gioia	Silver Bear for Best Actress; David di Donatello for Best Actress; Nominated — Academy Award for Best Actress; Nominated — BAFTA Award for Best Actress in a Leading Role; Nominated — Golden Globe Award for Best Actress - Motion Picture Drama
1957	Suor Letizia	Sister Letizia	Nastro d'Argento for Best Actress
1957	...And the Wild Wild Women	Egle	David di Donatello for Best Actress; Grolla d'Oro Best Actress; Sant Jordi Award for Best Performance in a Foreign Film; Nominated — Nastro d'Argento for Best Actress
1960	The Fugitive Kind	Lady Torrance	
1960	The Passionate Thief	Gioia Fabbricotti	
1962	Mamma Roma	Mamma Roma	
1966	Made in Italy	Adelina	In segment "La famiglia"; Nominated — Nastro d'Argento for Best Supporting Actress
1969	The Secret of Santa Vittoria	Rosa	Nominated — Golden Globe Award for Best Actress – Motion Picture Musical or Comedy
1971	Tre donne	La sciantosa - Flora Bertucciolli; 1943: Un incontro - Jolanda Morigi; L'automobile - Anna Mastronardi	3-part TV miniseries
1971	Correva l'anno di grazia 1870 (1870)	Teresa Parenti	Italian Golden Globe Award for Best Actress
1972	Roma	Herself	
