= Couleur Terre =

Couleur Terre (literally Colour Earth) is the French Swiss version of the Serious Request that broadcasts on Dutch radio/television. It was broadcast on French language Couleur 3 radio station.

The Dutch campaign started in 2004, with Couleur 3 joining in for 2007 campaign. The show appeals for money which each year helps a certain cause. The 2007 campaign was access for clean water.

A number of radio or television personalities were locked inside a glasshouse that was installed in Geneva, Switzerland on rue de la Rôtisserie. DJs Yann Zitouni, Émilie Gasc-Milesi and Michel Ndeze hosted six full days of the appeal. In its only year, the French Swiss radio station collected CHF 252,000 (about €151,000) by playing requests.

In 2009, the Schweizer Radio und Fernsehen (SRF)' Radio SRF 3 started a similar format of broadcasts in German language under the title Jeder Rappen zählt (Meaning every rappen or nickel counts). Swiss SRF zwei television station joined in with part of the broadcasts on TV. The German show has survived longer for the following years until presently (2014).

Since 2016, there's another version on RTS, called "Coeur à coeur" on Option Musique.

== See also ==
- Serious Request
- Jeder Rappen zählt
- Cœur à Cœur
