= Serious Request =

Radio program

Logo of Radio 3FM's Serious Request (2004–2013)

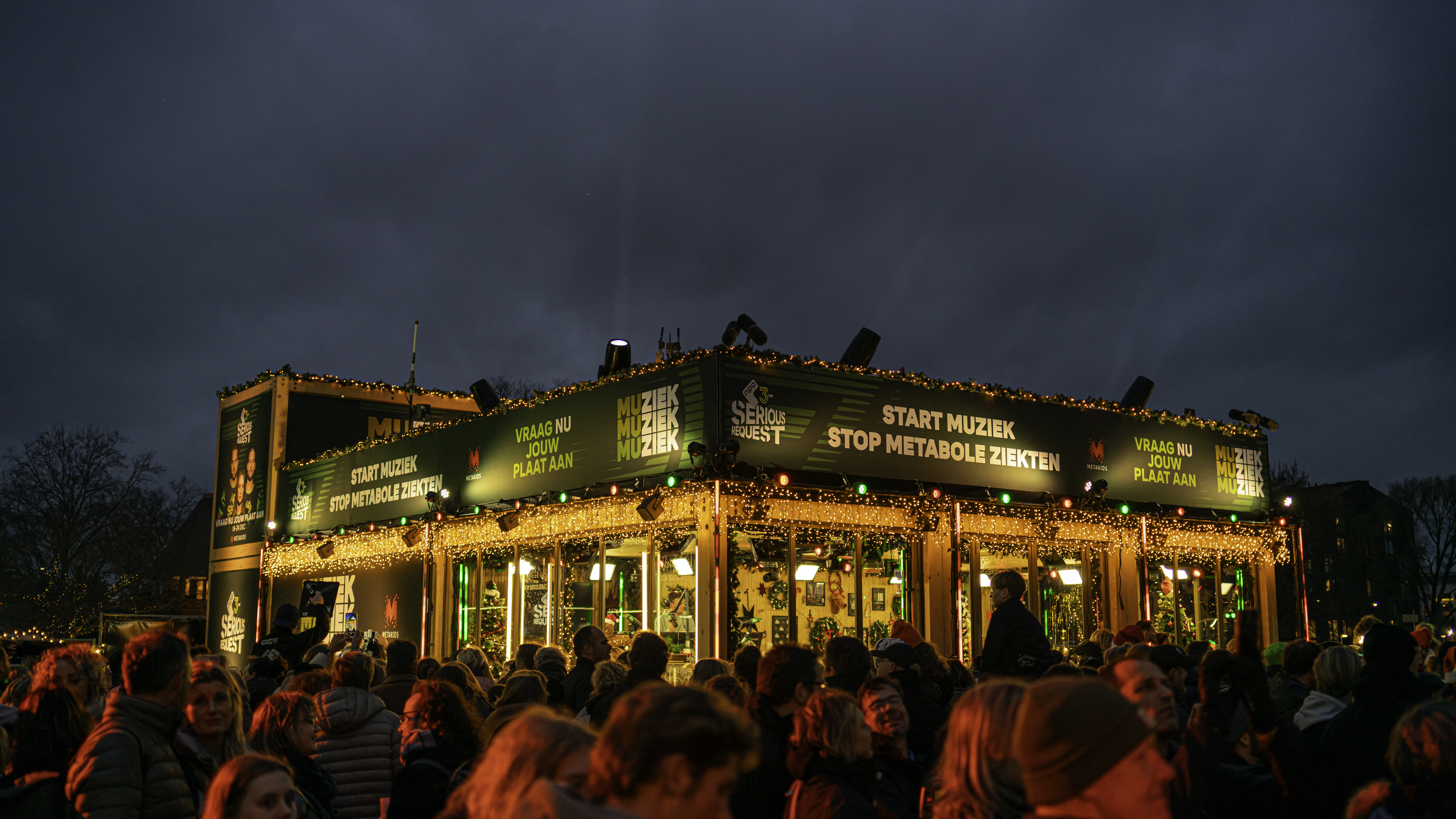
Glass house with DJs inside and spectators outside (Zwolle, 2024)

Serious Request is a family of annual multi-day, multimedia fundraising events. Initially for International Red Cross initiatives. Typically hosted by radio stations in the week before Christmas. The project was begun in 2004 by Dutch public pop music radio station 3FM. Serious Request projects have since been adopted in Belgium, Switzerland, Sweden, Kenya, South Korea, Austria, Germany, Latvia and Portugal.

The DJs make an interactive, themed broadcast around the clock, while regular programming on the station is suspended except for news bulletins. Instead, 3FM and its website are completely dedicated to the event, which is also transmitted as a continuous audio and video live-stream. Additionally, there is television coverage, integration with social media, and a dedicated mobile app.

Funds are raised in a few different ways. DJs play songs requested by listeners and visitors, in return for their donations. Celebrities and artists also donate personal possessions or offer unique opportunities to meet them, which are auctioned off. Straightforward donations are made into the project's bank account, and by physical visitors depositing cash and cheques into the house's letterbox. Additionally, members of the public run a variety of supporting initiatives, and in some cities, more glass houses are popping up. All totalled, the Dutch editions have raised €76.8 million through 2014, with total donations in some editions exceeding 10 million euros.

During the Dutch 3FM Serious Request, three radio DJs of the national channel (NPO) 3FM were locked up for six days in a small temporary radio studio. It is placed in a main square in a different city each year. During the event, they live on a liquid diet.

In the Netherlands, the Serious Request broadcasts and the Glass House (het Glazen Huis) became a national December tradition, that reaches most of the national population. The 2012 edition was watched and listened to by 12.1 million people over the age of ten, or 84% of Dutch people in that age group. Overall, 88% of the people were aware of the event.

From 2016, the general public's interest in the event, and therefore donations, were declining. In 2018 and 2019, 3FM decided to abolish their Glass House and tried to bring the event closer to the people by sending DJs of the radio station to travel the country on foot. The formula was called The Lifeline. In 2020, due to the pandemic, the DJs were locked up in an airport hangar. In 2021, it was decided to bring back the Glass House.

== Overview by country, in order of first adoption ==
Country	Name	Organizing station	Year and location
Adoption in 2004
Netherlands	Serious Request	NPO 3FM	2004: Utrecht; 2005: Utrecht; 2006: Utrecht; 2007: The Hague; 2008: Breda; 2009: Groningen; 2010: Eindhoven; 2011: Leiden; 2012: Enschede; 2013: Leeuwarden; 2014: Haarlem; 2015: Heerlen; 2016: Breda; 2017: Apeldoorn; 2018: Three different routes throughout the Netherlands, with main radio broadcasting in Utrecht; 2019: From Goes to Groningen; 2020: Enschede Airport Twente; 2021: Amersfoort; 2022: Amersfoort; 2023: Nijmegen; 2024: Zwolle; 2025: Den Bosch
Adoption in 2006
Belgium (Flanders)	Music For Life, renamed "De Warmste Week".	Studio Brussel	2006: Leuven; 2007: Leuven; 2008: Ghent; 2009: Ghent; 2010: Antwerp; 2011: Leuven, Ghent, Antwerp; 2012: Brussels (Note: Music For Life 2012 was an awareness campaign rather than a fundraiser, and did not feature a glass house.); 2013: Boom (Note: In 2013 and 2014 Music For Life evolved more into its own formula. Although still a radio-centric fundraising event hosted by three radio-DJs during the week before Christmas, the broadcast came from an open air winter campsite studio village, and was no longer tied to the Red Cross. Instead listeners could donate to hundreds of selected causes.); 2014: Boom; 2015: Boom; 2016: Boom; 2017: Wachtebeke; 2018: Wachtebeke; 2019: Kortrijk; 2020: Leuven; 2021: Mechelen; 2022: Hasselt; 2023: Bruges; 2024: Bruges; 2025: Genk
Adoption in 2007
Switzerland (French part)	Couleur Terre (2007) / Cœur à Cœur (since 2016)	Couleur 3 (2007) / Option Musique (2016-2018) / La Première (since 2019)	2007: Geneva; 2016: Lausanne; 2017: Lausanne; 2018: Lausanne; 2019: Sion; 2020: touring across the 7 cantons of Romandy; 2021: not held; 2022: touring across the 7 cantons of Romandy; 2023: Sion, Gruyères, Geneva, Montreux, Neuchâtel, Biel/Bienne, Delémont
Adoption in 2008
Kenya	Serious Request	Ghetto Radio 89.5FM	2008 through 2013: Nairobi; 2014: Nairobi slums
Sweden	Musikhjälpen	SR P3 & SVT	2008: Malmö; 2009: Gothenburg; 2010: Malmö; 2011: Gothenburg; 2012: Malmö; 2013: Gothenburg; 2014: Uppsala; 2015: Linköping; 2016: Örebro; 2017: Umeå; 2018: Lund; 2019: Västerås; 2020: Stockholm; 2021: Norrköping; 2022: Gothenburg; 2023: Växjö; 2024: Sundsvall; 2025: Karlstad; 2026: Linköping
Adoption in 2009
Switzerland (German part)	Jeder Rappen zählt	DRS 3 & SF zwei	2009: Bern; 2010: Bern; 2011: Lucerne; 2012: Lucerne; 2013: Zurich, Basel, Aarau, St. Gallen; 2014: Lucerne; 2015: Bern; 2016: Lucerne; 2017: Lucerne; 2018: Lucerne
Adoption in 2012
South Korea	Serious Request	KBS	2012: Seoul; 2013: Seoul; 2014: Seoul
Adoption in 2013
Belgium (Wallonia)	Viva For Life	VivaCité (RTBF)	2013: Liège; 2014: Liège; 2015: Charleroi; 2016: Charleroi; 2017: Nivelles; 2018: Nivelles; 2019: Tournai; 2020: Tour Reyers, Bruxelles (RTBF Headquarters); 2021: Tournai; 2022: Bertrix; 2023: Bertrix; 2024: Seraing; 2025: Seraing
Adoption in 2014
Austria	Weihnachtswunder: Wo jeder Wunsch hilft	Hitradio Ö3	2014: Salzburg; 2015: Graz; 2016: Innsbruck; 2017: Linz; 2018: St. Pölten; 2019: Villach; 2020: Vienna (Ö3 Headquarters); 2021: Vienna (Ö3 Headquarters); 2022: Bregenz; 2023: Bad Ischl; 2024: Wiener Neustadt; 2025: Salzburg
Latvia	Dod Pieci!	Latvijas Radio 5	2014: Rīga; 2015: Rīga, Central station square; 2016: Rīga, Central station square; 2017: Rīga, Doma Square; 2018: Rīga, Doma Square; 2019: Rīga, Doma Square; 2020: Rīga, Doma Square; 2021: Rīga, Doma Square; 2022: Rīga, Doma Square; 2023: Rīga, Doma Square; 2024: Rīga, Doma Square
Portugal	Toca a Todos	Antena 3	2014: Lisbon
Adoption in 2022
Germany	Weihnachtswunder	WDR 2	2022: Dortmund; 2023: Düsseldorf; 2024: Paderborn; 2025: Essen
Adoption in 2024
Germany	Weihnachtswunder	Bremen Eins & Bremen Vier	2024: Bremen, Domshof & Radio Bremen Headquarters; 2025: Bremen, Domshof & Radio Bremen Headquarters

== Request on Tour (2003) ==
The precursor of the Serious Request formula was the 3FM Request on Tour. During the last three days of 2003, Dutch national pop music radio station 3FM sent a "Request bus" with DJ equipment and a sound system on a tour of the country. By playing requested songs in return for donations, money was raised for Villa Pardoes, a resort for children between four and twelve with life-threatening illnesses; part of the amusement park the Efteling. Among others Gerard Ekdom, Giel Beelen and Rob Stenders participated—DJs who later returned in Serious Request efforts. An amount of €16,000 was collected that year.

== Creation – aid for Darfur (2004) ==
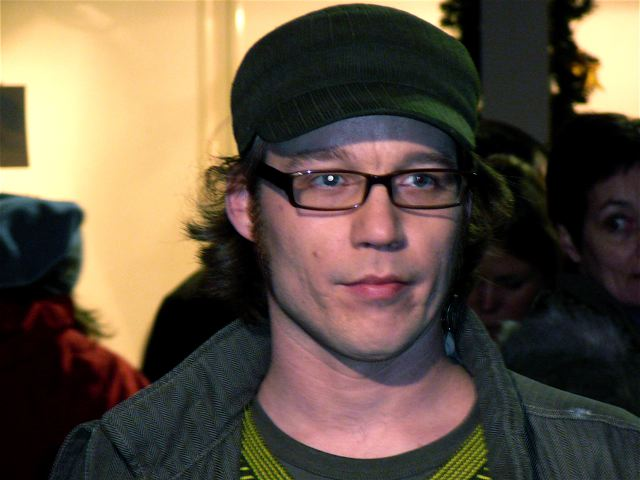
DJ Giel Beelen, co-creator of Serious Request, occupied the Glass House eight times through 2014

Prominent DJs Rob Stenders and Ruud de Wild left radio 3FM in 2004, and were later replaced by Giel Beelen and Wouter van der Goes. During the interim, station manager Florent Luyckx started making changes in programming to shore up ratings, especially for December. After the Russian Beslan school massacre has ended in September, the station wanted to aid the victims and their relatives; however, the humanitarian organization handling the crisis declined their offer. When the station then approached the Dutch Red Cross, they pleaded for help in matters overlooked by the news media, such as two million IDPs and refugees in the war-torn region of Darfur, Sudan. This was then made the cause for the first Serious Request radiothon from 20 to 24 December 2004, using the slogan Jouw druppel op een gloeiende plaat.

In a revised formula, DJ Jan-Willem Roodbeen suggested DJs living and broadcasting from a stationary structure with a lot of windows, not unlike the Big Brother TV-house. Giel Beelen added that the occupants should endure some hardship to express solidarity, and therefore suggested fasting.

In December 2004, a small temporary radio studio with large glass facades – a "glass house" – was erected in the Neude square in the center of Utrecht. Three radio DJs, Giel Beelen, Wouter van der Goes and Claudia de Breij, lived in the house for five days, fasting in solidarity with those in Darfur, and broadcasting Serious Request 24 hours a day on 3FM.

In the course of the event, a particular record began to stand out, because it was requested often, and it lifted the DJs' spirits. In 2004 this was "Galvanize" by the Chemical Brothers. Later editions have shown that this mechanism occurs every time – the particular track is then deemed the 'anthem' of that year's Serious Request.

In its first year the project collected €915,955, and received the 2004–05 Marconi Award for best radio program.

== 2005 – children in the Congo ==
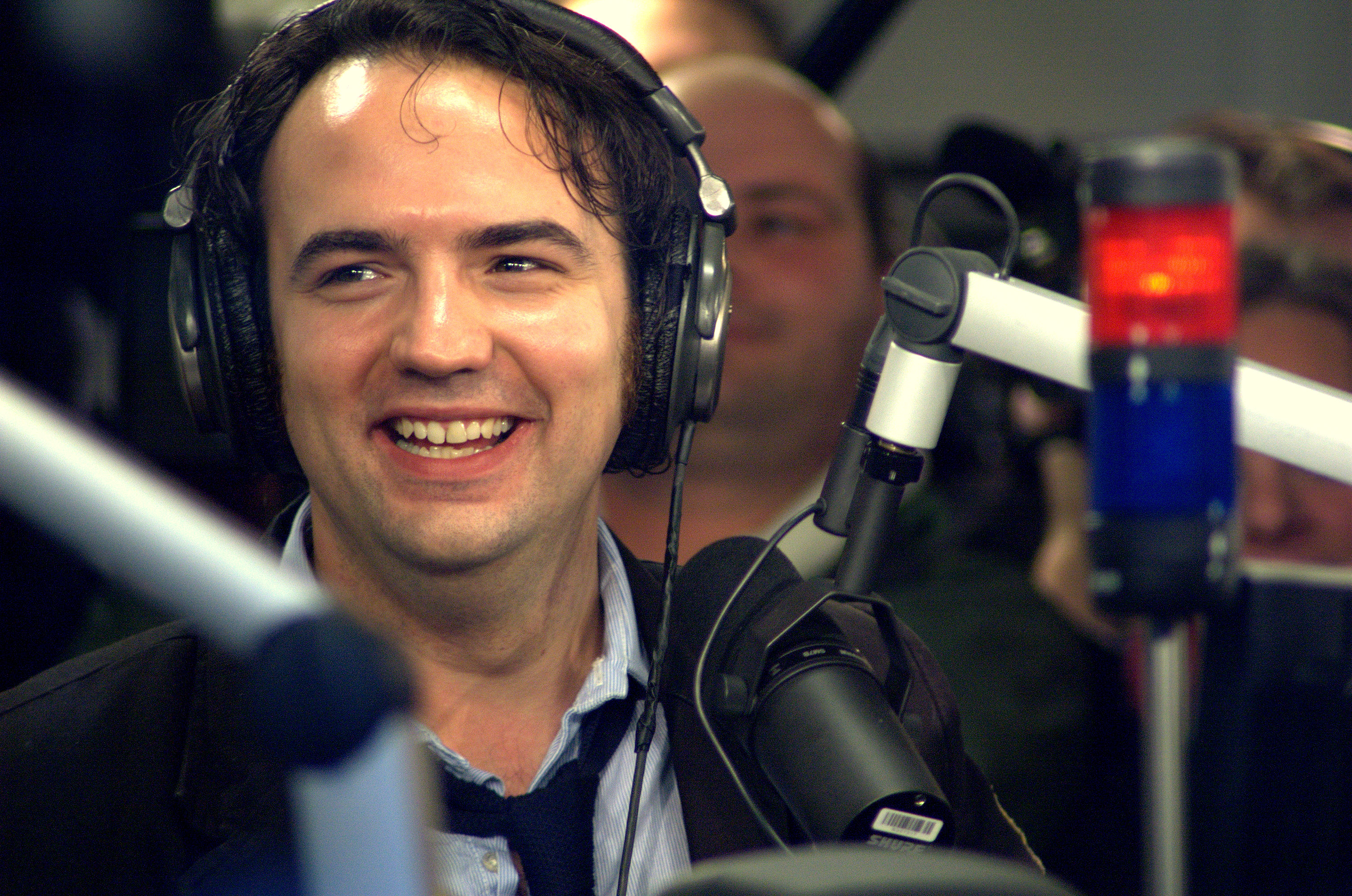
DJ Gerard Ekdom entered the house in 2005—like Beelen, he returned another seven times.

From 19 to 24 December 2005, a glass house was again present at the Neude in Utrecht. That year's DJs were Giel Beelen, Gerard Ekdom and Wouter van der Goes, and the slogan was: Red een kind in Congo (Save a child in the Congo). Money was collected for children, some of them former child soldiers, in the Republic of the Congo, raising a total of €2,203,549, including a €1,000,000 contribution from the Dutch government. The appeal was awarded the 2006 Gouden Radio-Oortje for best radio program of the year. The song Multiply by Jamie Lidell became the 'Serious Request anthem' for the edition.

Daily totals
Day		Amount
1	19 December	€53,573
2	20 December	€137,877
3	21 December	€251,281
4	22 December	€414,552
6	24 December	€2,203,549

== 2006 – land mines ==
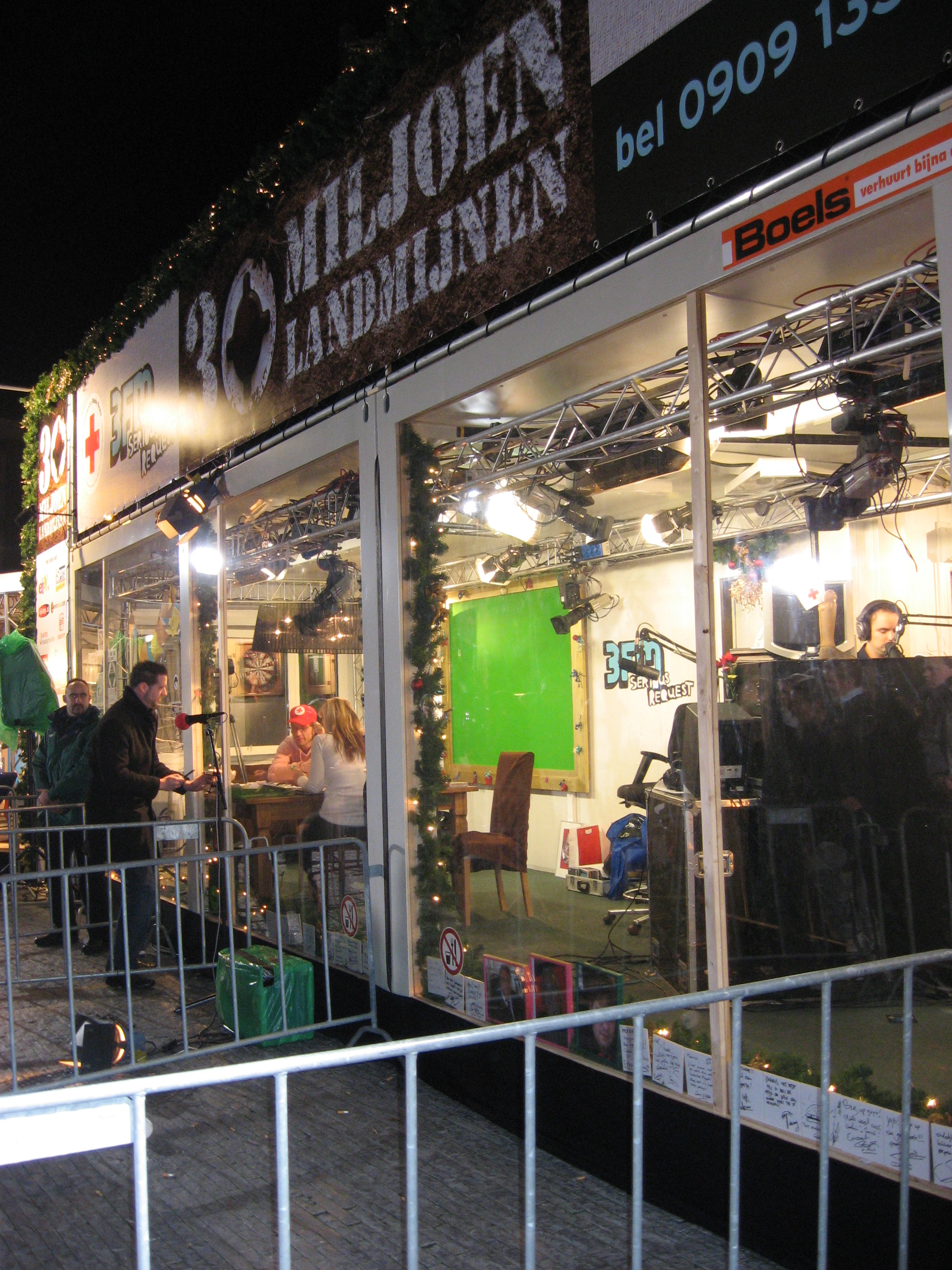
Outside of the 2006 house

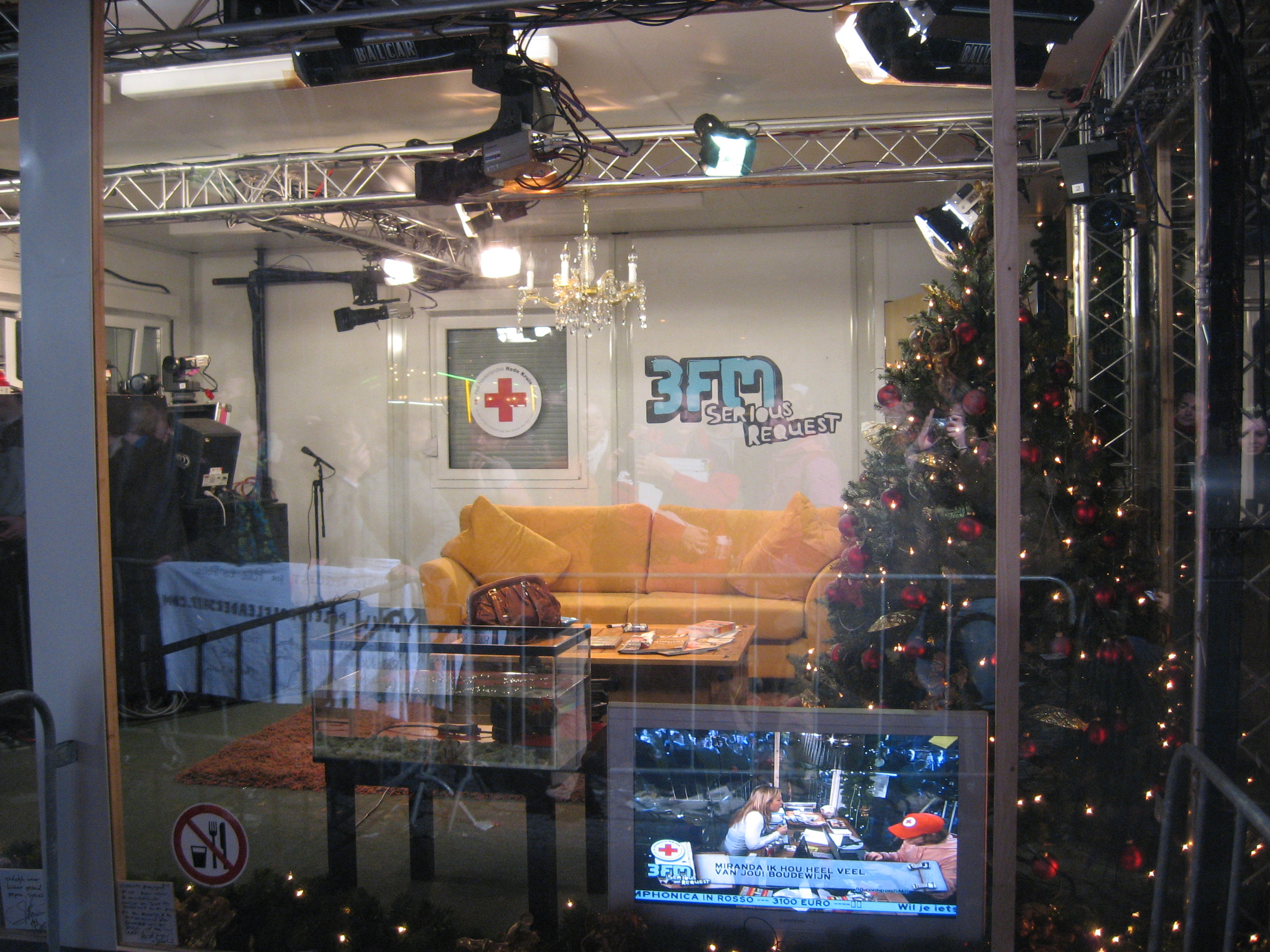
Inside of the house

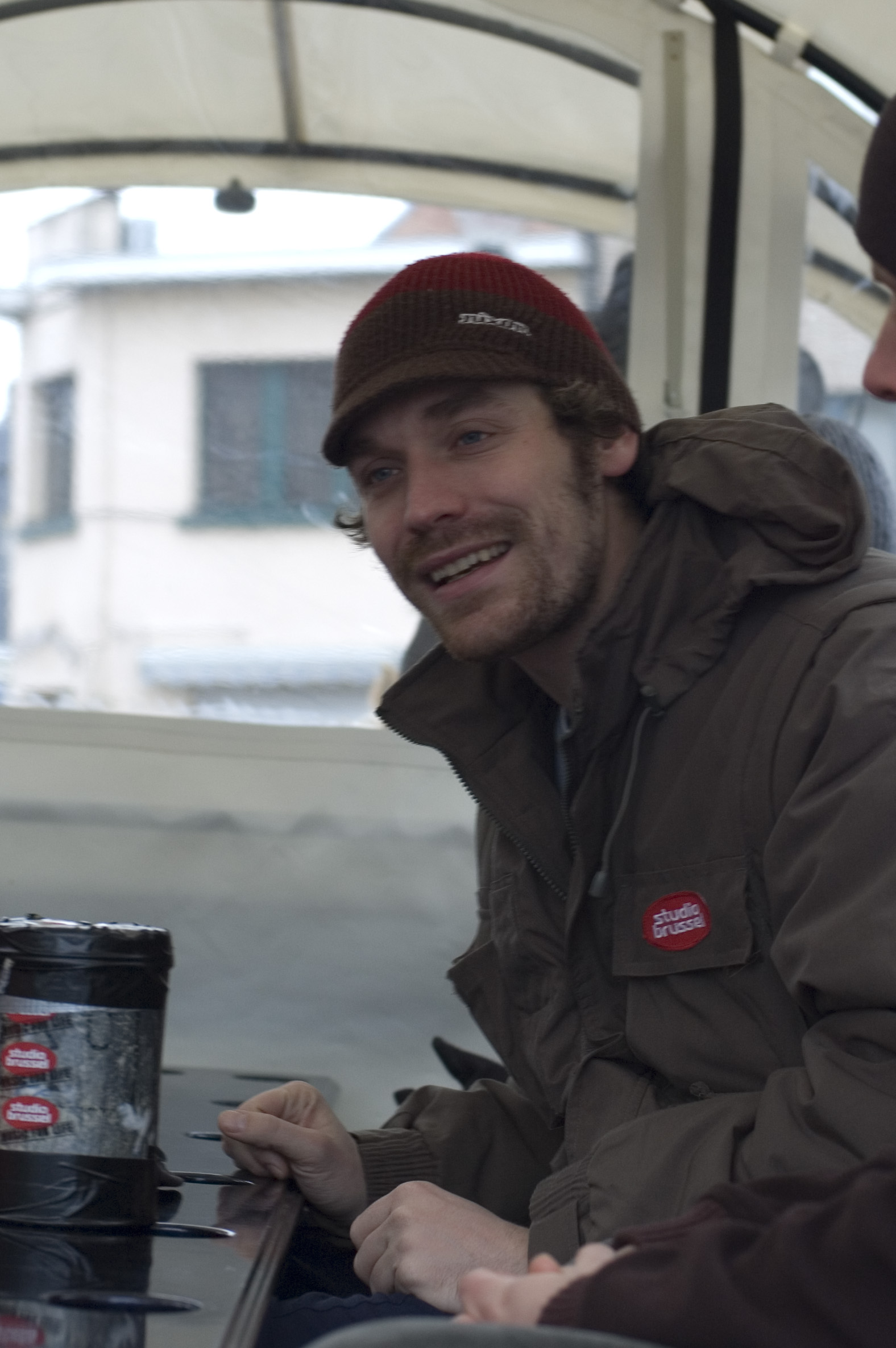
Otto-Jan Ham did a sponsored walk from Utrecht to Leuven

In 2006 Serious Request raised money for victims of land mines around the world, and for the first time a sister event was held in another country: neighbouring Belgium.

=== Netherlands ===
From 19 to 24 December 2006, the third consecutive appeal was held. As in the first two events, a glass house was built at the Neude in Utrecht. The year's slogan was: 30 miljoen landmijnen, daar kun je niet omheen (You can't get around 30 million land mines). Giel Beelen, Gerard Ekdom and Sander Lantinga were elected by listeners between 4 and 8 December to live in the house. Nominees had also included Claudia de Breij, Paul Rabbering, Coen Swijnenberg and Michiel Veenstra.

Prime Minister Jan Peter Balkenende ceremonially locked the door on 19 December to begin the effort, pledging to DJs and listeners that the Dutch government would donate one million euros to the project, as it did in 2005, to match the people's donations.

This year the DJs named Chelsea Dagger by the Fratellis the anthem song of the appeal. The song became popular, and during the night of 23–24 December it was played six times in four hours by request.

Daily totals
Day		Time	Amount
1	19 December	4:30 pm	€61,481
2	20 December	4:30 pm	€189,935
3	21 December	4:30 pm	€353,405
4	22 December	4:30 pm	€687,151
6	24 December	5:50 pm	€2,648,495*

* Total includes €1,000,000 donation by the Dutch government.

=== Belgium: Music For Life! ===
In addition to 3FM, the Flanders radio station Studio Brussel also participated in the appeal for the first time and DJs from both radio stations occasionally contacted each other. In Belgium, a second glass house was erected in Leuven. The DJs living there were Peter Van de Veire, Tomas De Soete and Christophe Lambrecht. The Belgian slogan was: Platen voor ledematen (Records for prosthetics). After six days a total of €2,901,650 was raised, consisting of some €1.4 million donated by the public, €100,000 from the Flemish Government and another €1.4 million from the Federal government, that had pledged to match the public's gifts.

Thus, the combined total for the Dutch and Belgian appeals amounted to €5,550,145.

=== Walkathons ===
To raise additional money, a walkathon was organized. DJ Claudia de Breij walked with her sidekick, Hildedepilde (Hilde Brontsema), from the Belgian to the Dutch house and Otto-Jan Ham of Studio Brussel did the same in the opposite direction. During the 211-kilometre (131 mi) walk listeners could sponsor the walkers (with a donation per kilometer) or offer them a place to stay the night or something to eat. All left their houses the morning of 19 December, and arrived at their destinations the afternoon of 24 December. De Breij collected €31,511 during her walk.

== 2007 – drinking water ==
Availability of safe drinking water was chosen as the cause for 2007—the slogan: De wereld schreeuwt om drinkwater (The world is crying for drinking water). As in 2006, the Dutch and Belgian efforts were synchronized. Additionally French Swiss radio station Couleur 3 joined with a similar event.

=== Netherlands ===
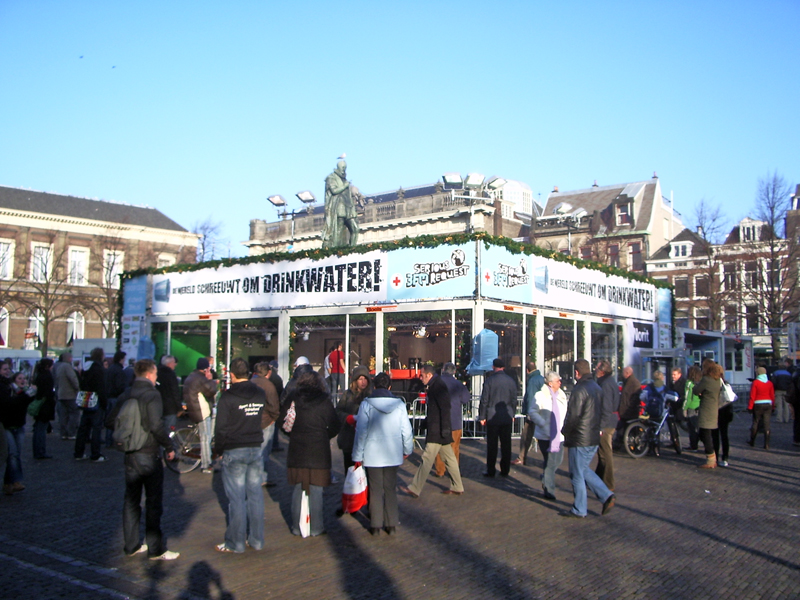
In 2007 the 3FM Glass House moved to a new city for the first time, starting in The Hague

In the Netherlands, the house of 3FM Serious Request was moved to another city for the first time, starting in The Hague. The DJs for the year were Gerard Ekdom, Rob Stenders and Michiel Veenstra. Sander Lantinga and Giel Beelen, occupants of the house the previous year, decided not to enter the voting and were unavailable to be chosen - instead, they volunteered to do tasks or errands in return for donations.

The appeal was opened on 19 December 2007 by Prince Willem-Alexander. The Dutch government announced that instead of donating €1,000,000 (as it had in previous years), it would match the amount of money collected from the public. Coen Swijnenberg hitchhiked from The Hague to Geneva (via Leuven) and back, carrying a bucket with 15 litres (4.0 US gal) of water. The anthem song for 2007 became Let's Dance to Joy Division by The Wombats.

Daily totals
Day		Time	Amount
1	19 December	4:45 pm	€102,360
2	20 December	4:45 pm	€248,982
3	21 December	4:35 pm	€476,337
4	22 December	4:35 pm	€842,243
6	24 December	7:40 pm	€5,249,466*

*Total includes match by the Dutch government

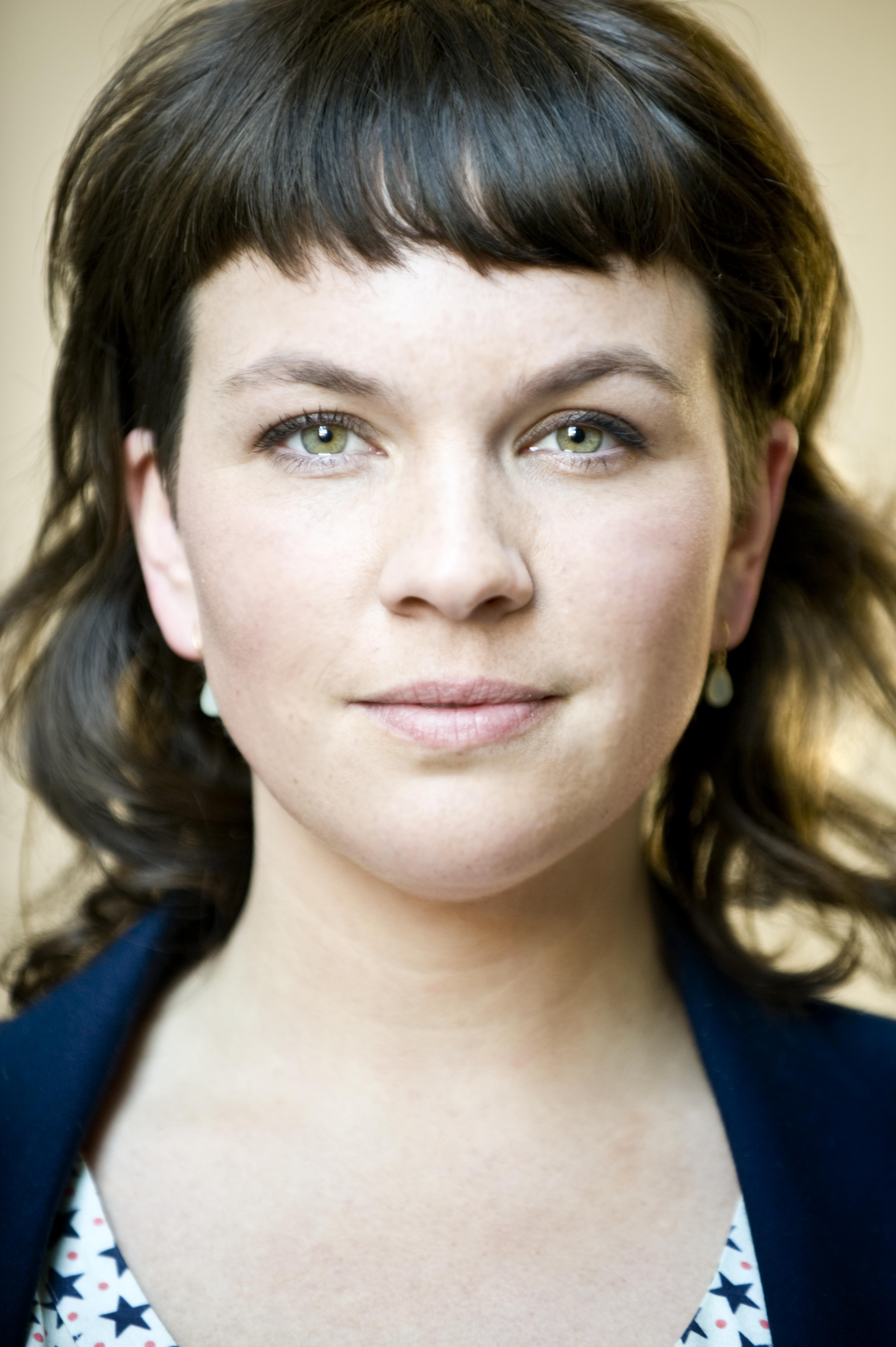
Flanders DJ Siska Schoeters co-hosted Music For Life in 2007, 2008, 2009, 2011 and 2013

=== Belgium: Music For Life 2007 ===
Studio Brussel again participated in the appeal. From the Martelarenplein in Leuven, DJs Peter Van de Veire, Tomas De Soete and Siska Schoeters, collected €2,083,030 from Belgian listeners. Again this was augmented by the Flemish and the Belgian federal governments, which donated €300,000 and €1 million respectively in 2007, bringing the total raised to €3,383,030.

DJ Otto-jan Ham was sponsored to leave Leuven without money, traveling to the glass houses in The Hague and Geneva, and back to Leuven, carrying a bucket of water. He brought home 8.5 liters, netting €45,925 for his effort. In conjunction with the event, a ship left Essen (Germany) with a 20,000-litre pool aboard. En route 10 swimmers took turns swimming for 24 hours (the length of the trip), raising €14,000.

=== Switzerland: Couleur Terre ===
French Swiss radio station Couleur 3 in Geneva joined the appeal in 2007. The event was called Couleur Terre and its glass house was located on the rue de la Rôtisserie. In its first and only year, it collected CHF 252,000 (about €151,000)—entirely by playing requests. DJs Yann Zitouni, Émilie Gasc-Milesi and Michel Ndeze hosted the benefit for six full days.

Results - 2007
Country	Project name	Results	Comments
Belgium	Music For Life	€3,383,030	€1,300,000 contributed by the Belgian governments
Netherlands	Serious Request	€5,249,466	€2,624,733 contributed by the Dutch government
Switzerland	Couleur Terre	252,000 CHF (€151,218)	Raised exclusively by playing requested songs
Total		€8,783,714	

== 2008 – refugees ==
In 2008, Serious Request and its sister projects raised money and awareness for refugees, with a varying focus. The Dutch 3FM Serious Request, and the new Swedish event Musikhjälpen, aimed to help the world's refugees in general, whereas the Belgian Glass House focused specifically on refugee mothers. The year also saw the first similar project take place in Africa: Serious Request Kenya. Instead of funds, it raised awareness, focusing more on internally displaced persons than on (international) refugees. Couleur Terre in Switzerland was not continued.

=== Netherlands ===
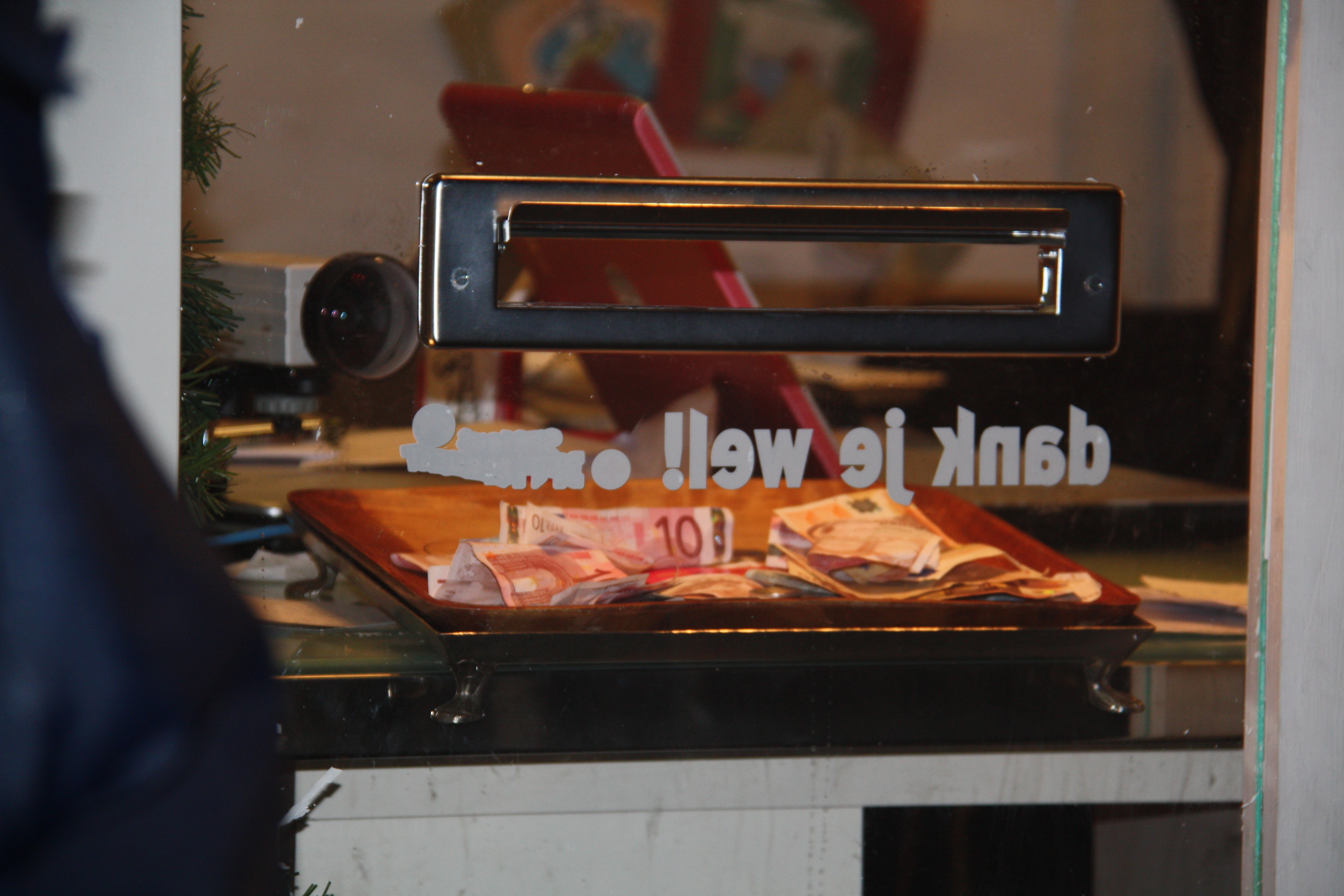
Letterbox fitted in the glass facade, for cash money and cheques deposited by visitors

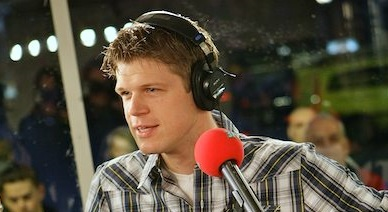
3FM DJ Coen Swijnenberg's first stint in the house in 2008. He has done four more through 2014

For 2008, the Glass House was located on the Grote Markt in Breda, inhabited by DJs Giel Beelen, Coen Swijnenberg and Paul Rabbering. The proceeds were directed to help refugees around the world; its slogan was Een vluchteling is nergens zonder jouw hulp (A refugee is nowhere without your help). The Dutch government pledged to match donations up to €2.5 million. The anthem for the edition, chosen by the DJs, was "Verliefdheid" by Dutch singer Jordy van Loon. Aside from the anthem, 2008 introduced a dedicated theme song, made specifically for the event by a music act, to be played regularly in the weeks leading up to the appeal, and to be used in promotional messages. In 2008 this was "Waiting So Long" by Belgian band Novastar.

Daily totals
Day		Time	Amount
1	19 December	4:55 pm	€140,523
2	20 December	4:40 pm	€327,709
3	21 December	4:35 pm	€595,480
4	22 December	4:40 pm	€847,223
5	23 December	4:45 pm	€1,377,338
6	24 December	8:21 pm	€3,137,937 €5,637,961 (Note: Total amount including a €2,500,000 donation by the Dutch government.)

=== Belgium: Music For Life 2008 ===
This year the Belgian glass house was moved to Ghent. National public broadcaster VRT supplemented Radio Brussel's program with continuous digital television. DJs Siska Schoeters, Sofie Lemaire and Tomas de Soete of Studio Brussel lived in the house from 19 to 24 December, raising €3,513,728 for mothers on the run (original slogan: Moeders op de vlucht). As in 2007, the total included contributions by the Flemish and the Belgian federal governments of €300,000 and €1 million respectively.
In an event called Bed on the Run, DJs Linde Merckpoel and Sam de Bruyn raised €15,000 with a Nokia sponsored handicap hitchhike from the Swedish glass house in Malmö, via the Dutch one in Breda to Ghent, bringing with them a made-up bed.

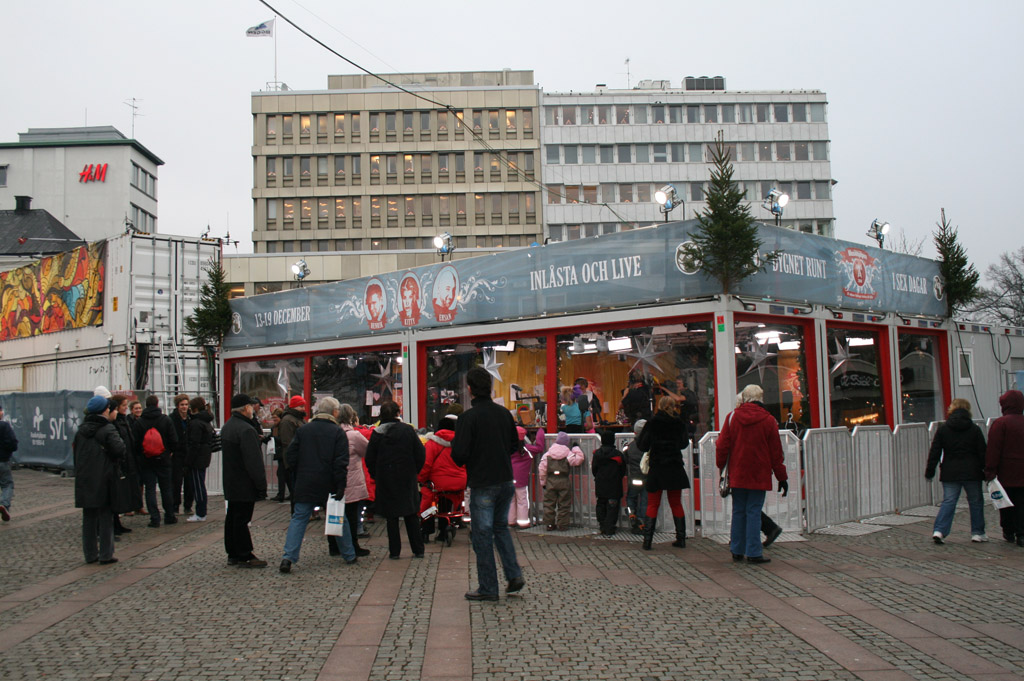
Glass house in Malmö, 2008

=== Sweden: Musikhjälpen ===
Sweden participated for the first time, with a glass house in Malmö. The appeal was called Musikhjälpen ("Music Aid"), and the theme was refugees (slogan: 67 miljoner flyktingar behöver din hjälp, meaning 67 million refugees need your help). Because of Swedish Christmas celebrations, the appeal began one week earlier. The appeal aired 24 hours daily on Sveriges Radio (SR) P3 and Din Gata 100.6—SVT Play and SVT2 aired the appeal on a time-permitting basis. Hosts were Kitty Jutbring, Henrik Torehammar and Ehsan Noroozi. Guests during the six-day marathon included rap artist Timbuktu, Danish actor Mads Mikkelsen and the Swedish national ice-hockey team. In its first year the appeal raised a total of 3,016,247 Swedish kronor, or €277,778.

=== Kenya: Serious Request ===
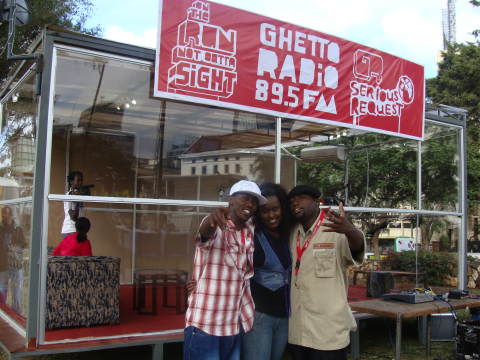
Glass house, Nairobi

With the participation of Ghetto Radio 89.5 FM in Nairobi, Serious Request was held in Kenya with the slogan "On the Run, but not Outta Sight". This was the first time the event was held in Africa. The Nairobi glass house was located on the grounds of the Kenyatta International Conference Centre; the three presenters were Angela ‘Angel’ Wainaina, Rapcha the Sayantist (Note: Real name: Francis Kibe, a comedian most well known as ‘Lambert’ in popular television programme Vioja Mahakamani (Drama in the Courtroom).) and Muki Garang. Between 19 and 24 December 2008, their continued broadcast and interaction with visitors raised awareness for the plight of Internally displaced persons (IDPs). Instead of fundraising, the approach focused on solidarity.

Results - 2008
Country	Project name	Results	Comments
Belgium	Music For Life	€3,513,728	€1,300,000 contributed by the Belgian governments
Netherlands	Serious Request	€5,637,937	€2,500,000 contributed by the Dutch government
Sweden	Musikhjälpen	3,016,247 Kr (€277,778)	Held one week earlier
Total		€9,429,443	

== 2009 – malaria ==
In 2009 all projects from 2008 received a new edition, and Switzerland returned with a new initiative: Jeder Rappen zählt, this time hosted by Radio SRF 3 in the country's German-speaking part. The year's five events all raised funds to fight malaria.

=== Netherlands ===
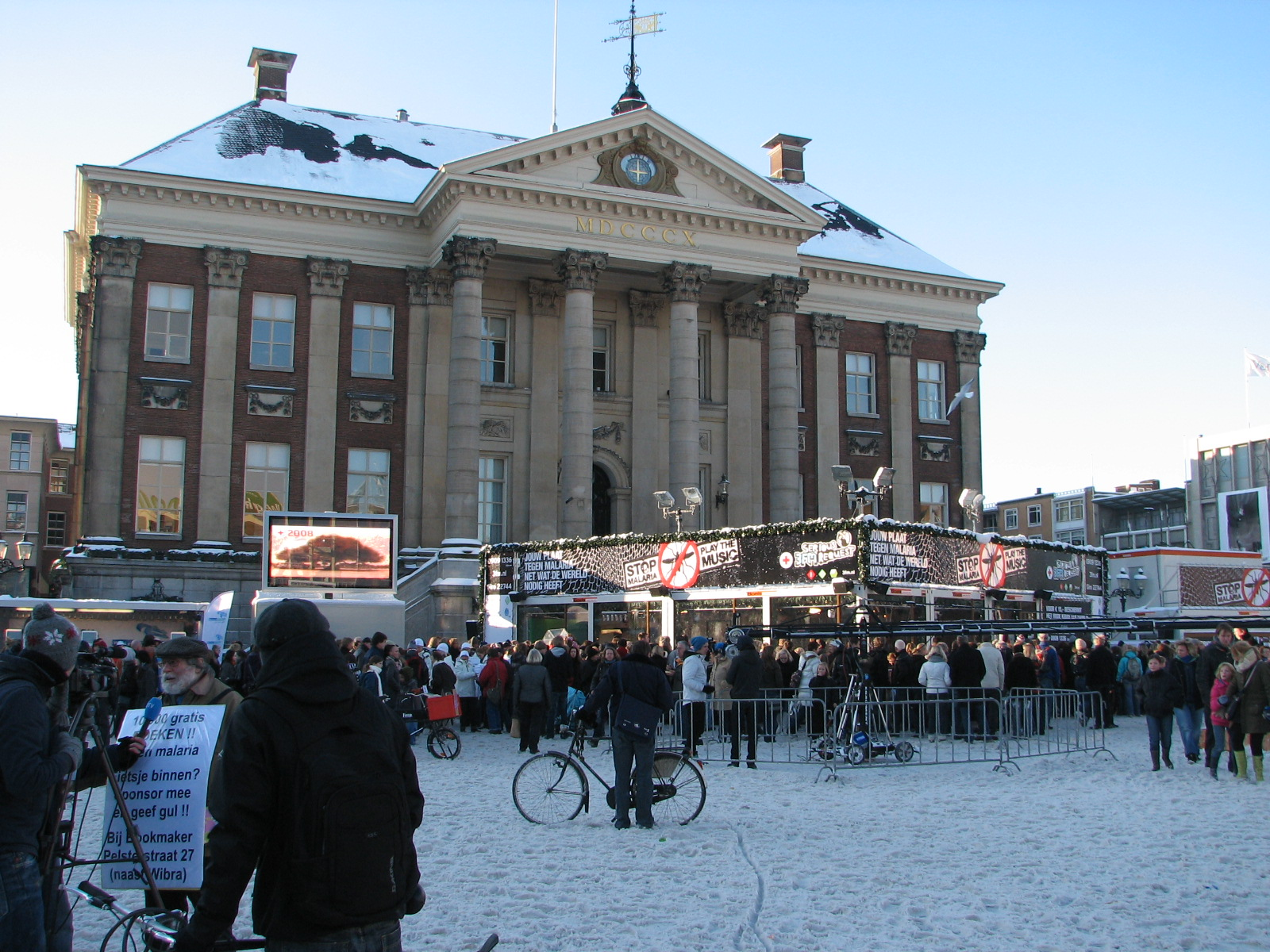
Dutch Glass House in front of Groningen city hall, 2009

The 2009 location for 3FM Serious Request was Groningen, and the fundraising slogan: Stop Malaria, Play the Music. DJs Giel Beelen, Gerard Ekdom and Annemieke Schollaardt lived in the glass house. The house was ceremonially closed by Princess Máxima on 18 December. VanVelzen's keyboard, as well as autographed shirts from members of AFC Ajax and FC Groningen were auctioned, and every night a celebrity guest stayed for one night. The year's theme song was One Song by rockband Rigby, and It Gets Better by Ryan Shaw became the event's anthem. Minister for Development Cooperation Bert Koenders contributed €3 million on behalf of the Dutch government—€4,113,447 was raised by the public.

Daily totals
Day		Time	Amount	Overnight guest
1	19 December	4:53 pm	€244,668	Thomas Acda
2	20 December	4:52 pm	€428,629	Do
3	21 December	4:52 pm	€706,174	Youp van 't Hek
4	22 December	4:53 pm	€1,058,594	VanVelzen
5	23 December	4:53 pm	€1,740,302	Angela Groothuizen
6	24 December	8:20 pm	€7,113,447	Waylon

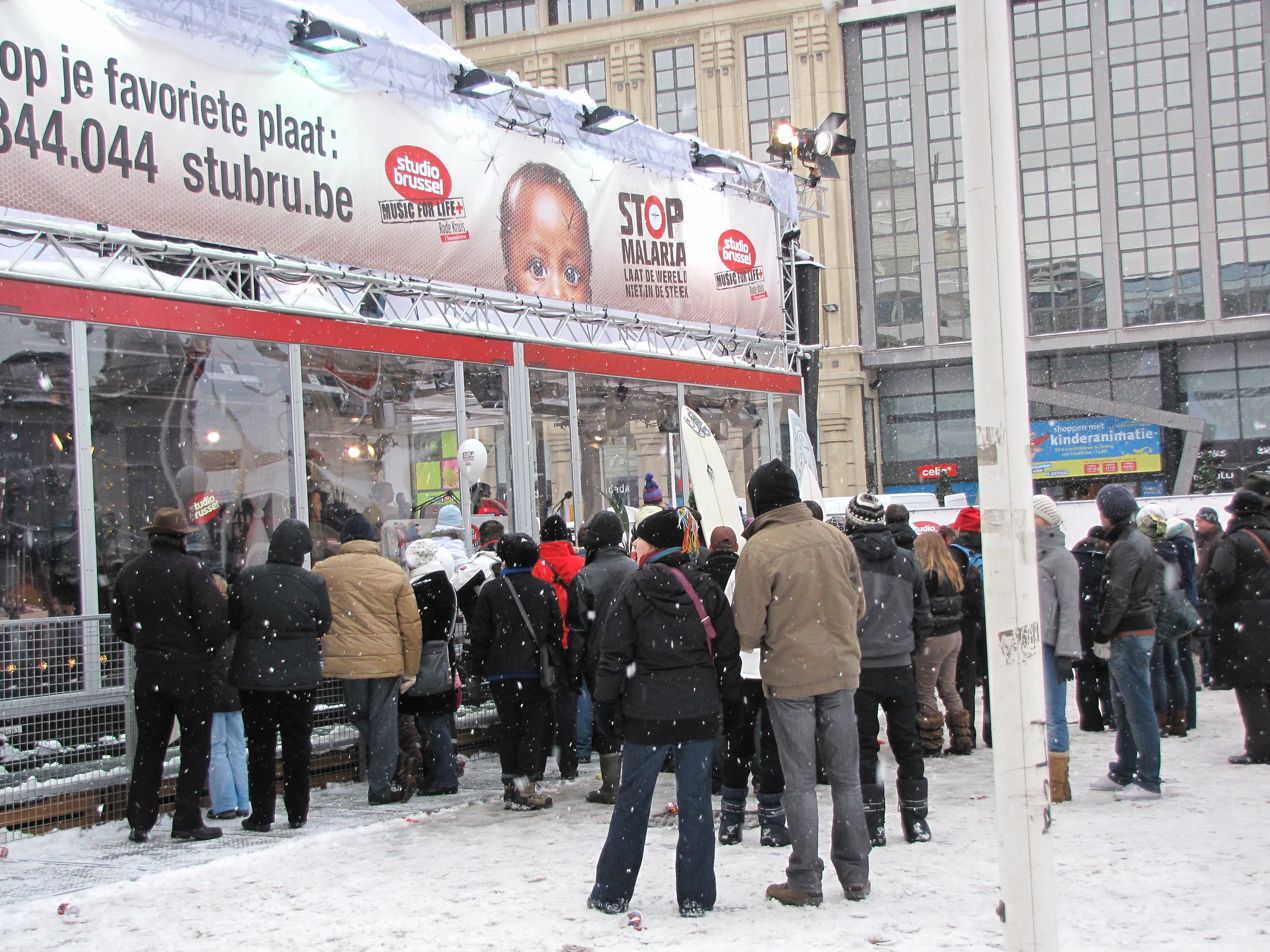
Music for Life house 2009, Ghent

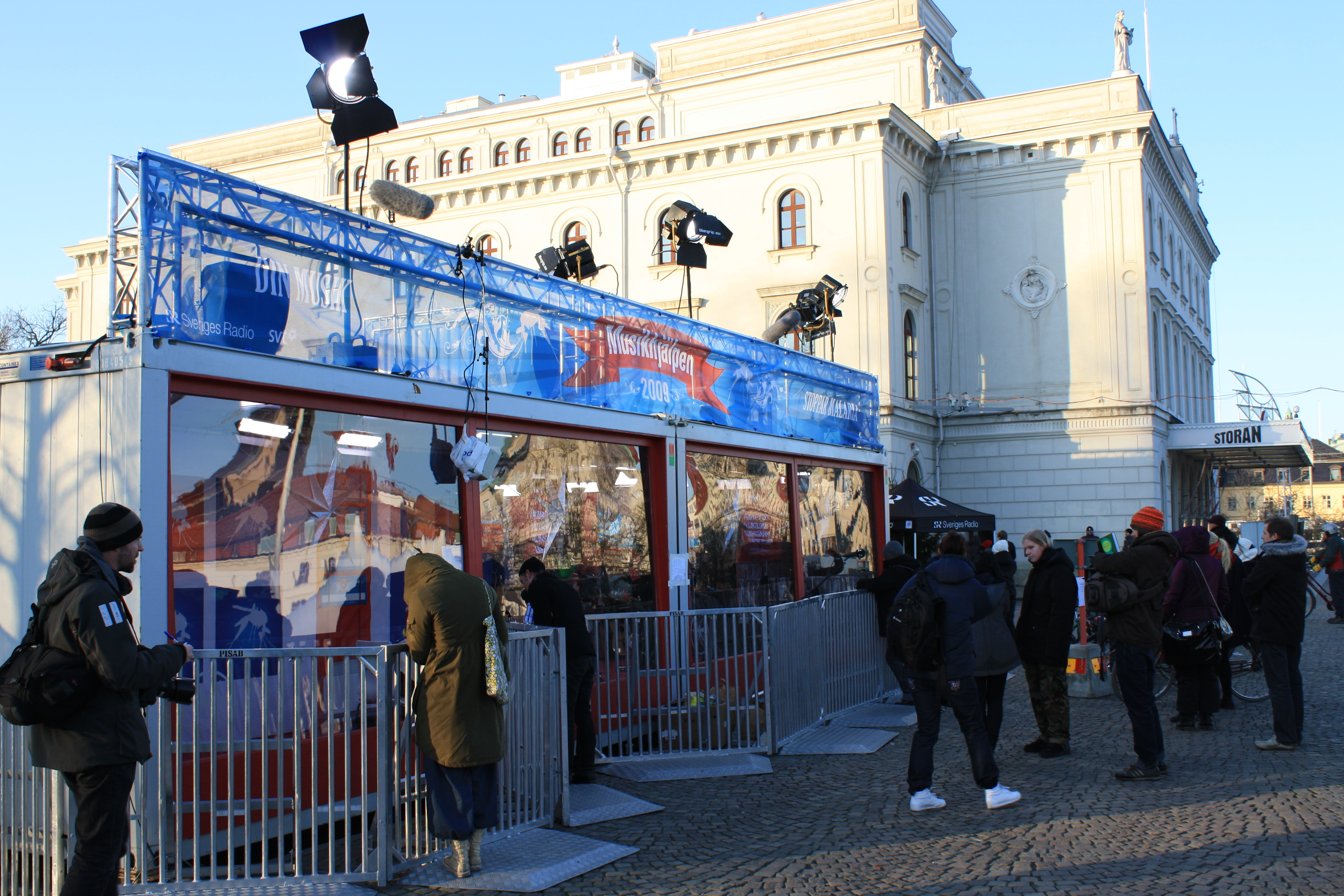
The Swedish house in Gothenburg

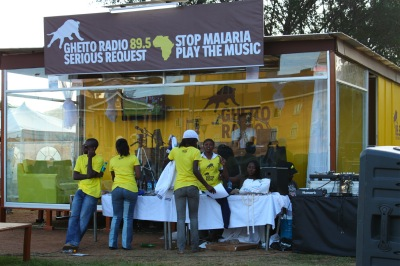
Kenya house against malaria

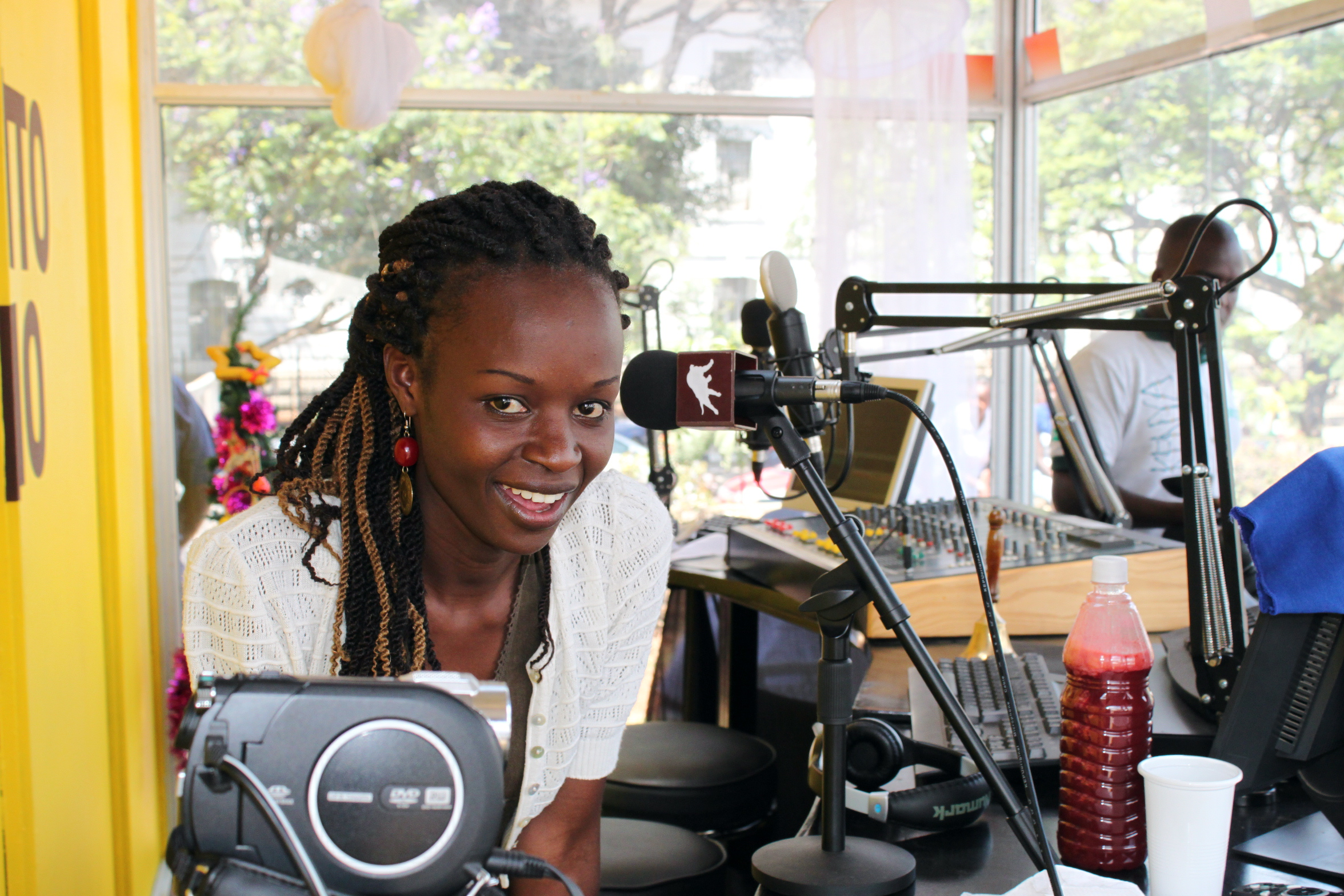
One of Kenya's DJs on 23 December 2009

=== Belgium: Music For Life 2009 ===
Studio Brussel again located its glass house in Ghent and the DJs were Siska Schoeters, Sam Debruyn and Sofie Lemaire. With the simple slogan Stop Malaria it raised €3,955,223, primarily for mosquito nets in Burundi. Like the previous years €1,300,000 came from the Belgian federal and Flemish governments, and €2,655,223 from listeners.

=== Sweden: Musikhjälpen 2009 ===
Musikhjälpen 2009 was held from 14 to 20 December in Gothenburg. The appeal was again broadcast around the clock on the Internet at SVT Play and on SR P3, and telecast (time permitting) on SVT2. Hosts were Ametist Azordegan, Christer Lundberg and Jason Diakité (Timbuktu). The theme of the 144-hour show was Din musik stoppar malaria (Your music stops malaria) and it raised a total of 5,748,442 SEK (or €552,425).

=== Switzerland: Jeder Rappen zählt ===
In 2009, an appeal with the slogan Jeder Rappen zählt—"every (Swiss) penny counts"—was held for the first time in Bern, aimed at German-speaking Switzerland. In the glass house were Radio SRF 3 DJs Mario Torriani, Nik Hartmann and Judith Wernli. In total, CHF 9,348,113 (or €4,699,410) was raised to fight malaria, using the moniker Gemeinsam gegen Malaria (Together against malaria).

=== Kenya: Serious Request 2009 ===
Ghetto Radio's broadcast of Stop Malaria, Play the Music in Nairobi was violently interrupted on 23 December, when its glass house was hit by a tropical rainstorm. However nobody was injured; the DJs were taken to a hotel where they continued to refuse food. They resumed broadcast the next day after the glass house was repaired. Contrary to their 2008 effort, this time fundraising was an objective; however, the achieved result was not made public.

Results - 2009
Country	Project name	Results	Remarks
Belgium	Music For Life	€3,955,223	18–24 December
Netherlands	Serious Request	€7,113,447	18–24 December
Sweden	Musikhjälpen ("Music Aid")	5,748,442 SEK (€552,425)	13–19 December
Switzerland	Jeder Rappen zählt ("Every penny counts")	9,348,113 CHF (€4,699,410)	Held the previous week
Total		€16,320,505	

== 2010 – HIV/AIDS and children ==
All five projects from 2009 were given a continuation, with varying themes relating to HIV/AIDS and children. The Dutch and Belgian efforts centered on orphaned children in sub-Saharan Africa, especially those who became such by losing one or both parents to AIDS. The Swiss theme were children in war zones and conflict areas, whereas the Swedes focused on the fight against trafficking of children. In Kenya on the other hand, education about HIV/AIDS was the spearpoint, and people were called to have themselves tested.

=== Netherlands ===
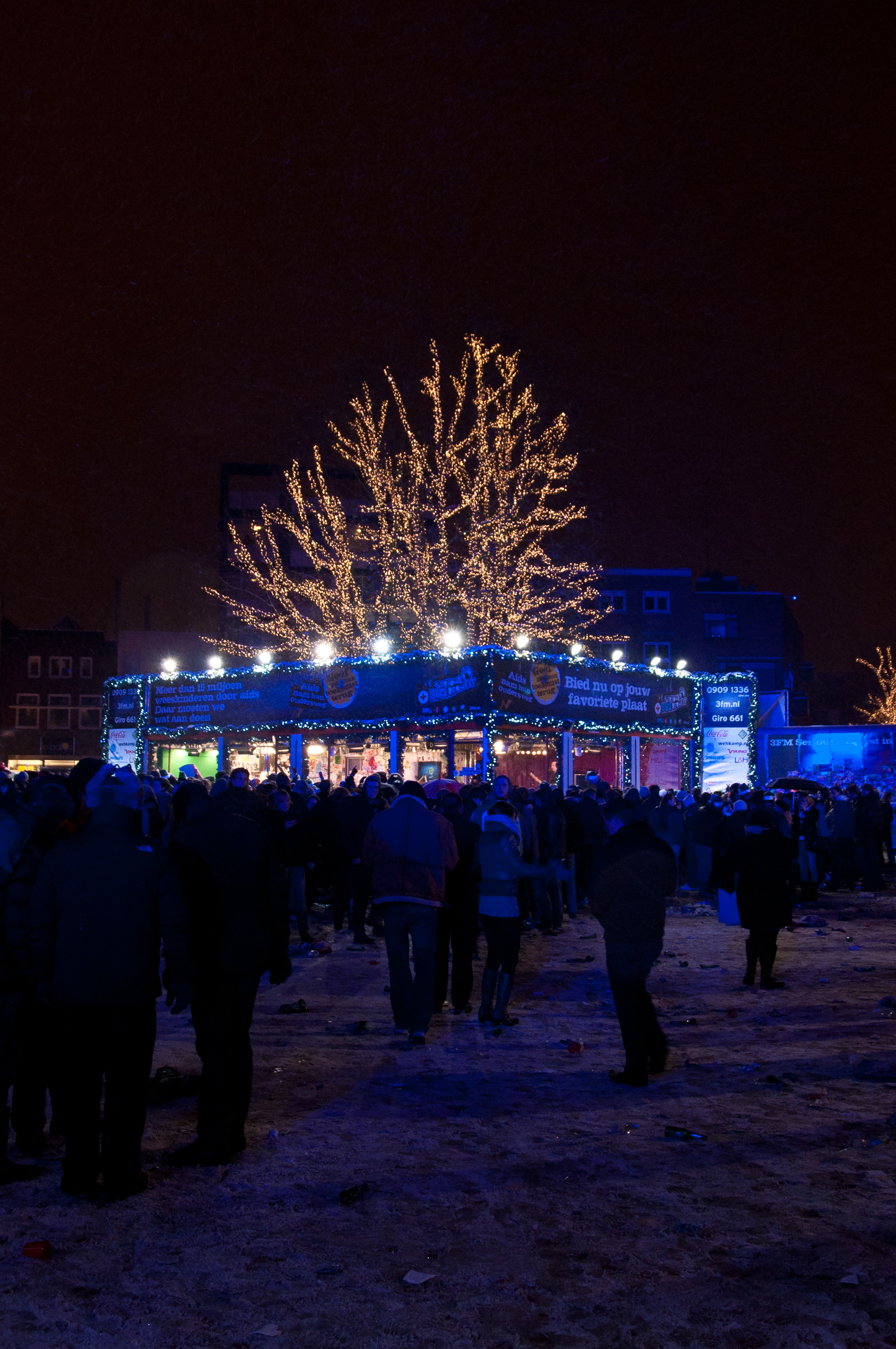
3FM Glass House 2010 in Eindhoven at night

The 2010 location for Serious Request was Eindhoven. DJs Giel Beelen, Gerard Ekdom and Coen Swijnenberg hosted the appeal. Its theme was AIDS orphans, and the slogan: Aids nam hun ouders weg, geef ze hun toekomst terug! (AIDS took their parents away, give them their future back!). The Dutch government did not donate because of a stricter budgetary policy; however, the public and many companies made up the difference, and the previous record was exceeded by several thousand euro. The theme song was BLØF's "Wijd Open" ("Wide Open"), and the anthem and most requested song was Hello by Martin Solveig ft. Dragonette.

After the last evening of the event, some money was still coming in, clocking in at a final €7,471,000.

Daily totals
Day		Time	Amount
1	19 December	8:30 pm	€273,745
2	20 December	8:30 pm	€494,024
3	21 December	8:30 pm	€1,004,986
4	22 December	8:30 pm	€1,755,088
5	23 December	8:30 pm	€3,128,049
6	24 December	8:30 pm	€7,135,707

=== Belgium: Music For Life 2010 ===
As in previous years Studio Brussel organized Music For Life, siting the glass house on the Groenplaats in Antwerp. The DJs that year were Sofie Lemaire, Sam Debruyn and Tomas De Soete. Like the Dutch effort, its theme was AIDS orphans – the slogan was Laat een weeskind niet alleen (Don't leave an orphaned child behind). The appeal was announced on 1 December, World AIDS Day. Bands were invited to play on the roof each evening, the best-known of which were the Editors. The bottom line for 2010 was €5,020,747, and as before this included €1,300,000 from the Belgian federal and Flemish governments.

=== Sweden: Musikhjälpen 2010 ===
Musikhjälpen 2010 was held from 13 to 19 December, with its glass house back in Malmö. Its theme was the fight against the trafficking of children under the motto "Barn är inte till salu" ("Children are not for sale"). The appeal was again broadcast continuously on the Internet at SVT Play and SR P3 radio and time-permitting on SVT2 TV. Its hosts were Martina Thun, Jason Diakité (Timbuktu) and Nour El-Refai. By the morning of 18 December, the previous year's proceeds record was broken; when the show was over 12,236,417 SEK had been collected.

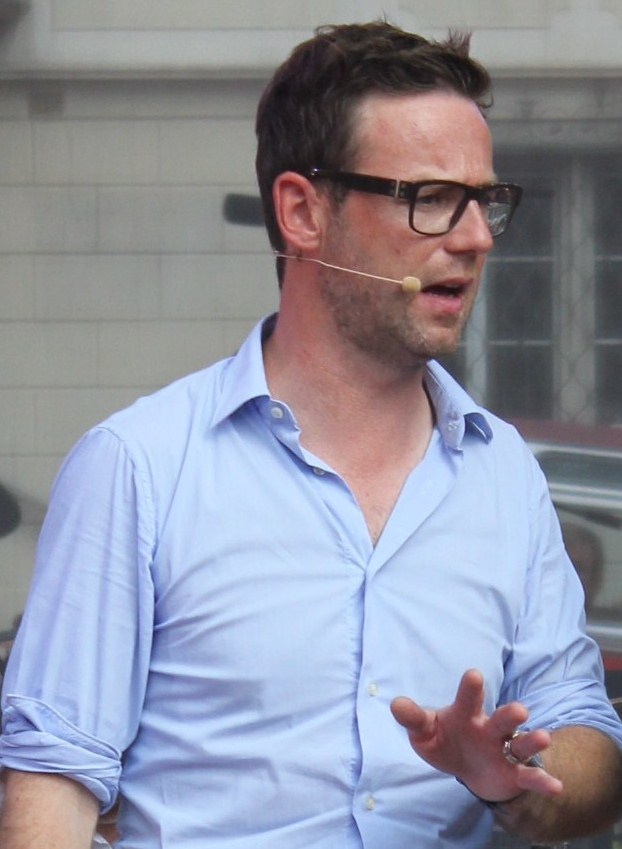
Swiss DJ Nik Hartmann was in the glass house every time since the start (2009 - 2014)

=== Switzerland: Jeder Rappen zählt 2010 ===
The 2010 appeal in German-speaking Switzerland, Kindern Zukunft schenken (Give children a future), focused on children in war zones and conflict areas. Radio station DRS 3 located the glass house again in Bern. The DJs were Nik Hartmann, Anic Lautenschlager and Tom Gisler. Samih Sawiris added 20 percent to the total from his Sawiris Foundation, so a total of €5,251,835.92 was raised.

=== Kenya: Serious Request 2010 ===
The 2010 Kenyan appeal by Ghetto Radio sited its glass house opposite the Hilton Nairobi from 19 to 24 December. Instead of raising money, listeners were educated about HIV/AIDS, and encouraged to be tested. Some 2140 people were tested on HIV on site during the 6-days event, actually setting a Kenyan record. Live streaming footage of the event featured on the "This Is Africa" website (part of the Pan-African Ghetto Radio Foundation).

Results - 2010
Country	Project name	Results	Remarks
Belgium	Music For Life	€5,020,747	18–24 December
Netherlands	Serious Request	€7,471,000	18–24 December
Sweden	Musikhjälpen	12,236,417 Kr (€1,360,785)	13–19 December
Switzerland	Jeder Rappen zählt	11,504,208 Fr. (€7,062,607)	Held the previous week
Kenya	Serious Request	2,141 people tested for HIV	
Total		€20,915,139	

== 2011 ==
=== Netherlands: This One's for Mama ===
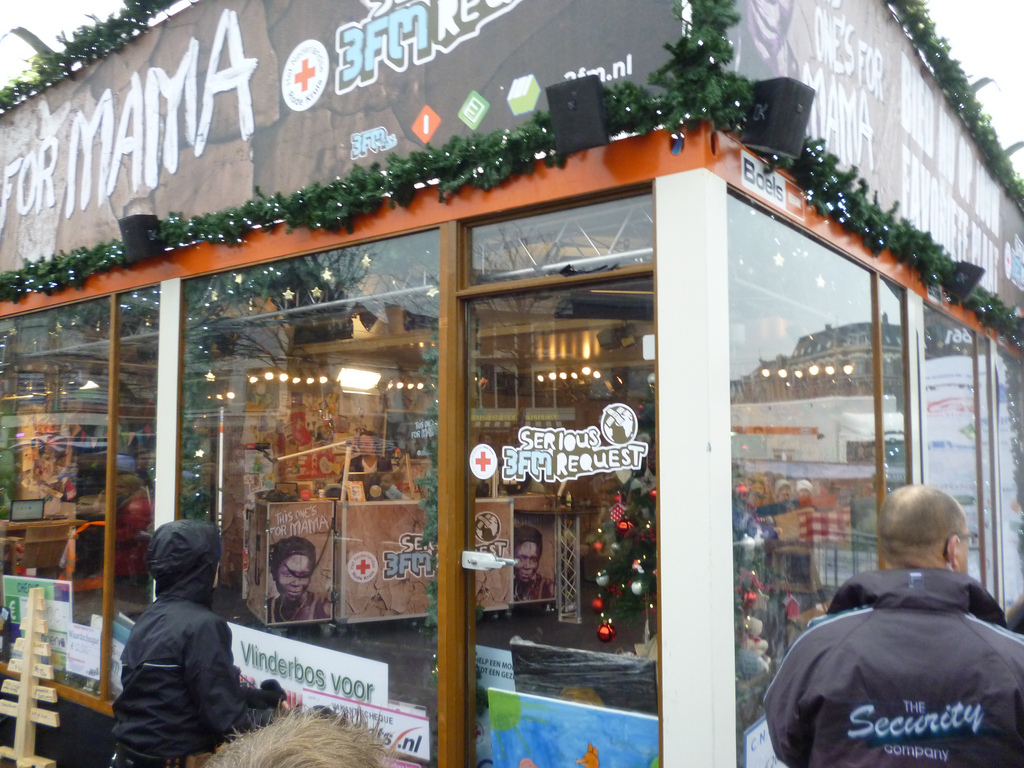
Serious Request house in Leiden

With the announcement of the location for Serious Request 2010, the station also announced the location of the 2011 appeal (Leiden). That year, a glass house was created that floated on water.

Daily totals
Day		Time	Amount	Guest
1	19 December	4:50 pm	€295,382	Krystl
2	20 December	4:50 pm	€662,858	Jörgen Raymann
3	21 December	4:50 pm	€1,203,941	Irene Moors
4	22 December	4:50 pm	€1,972,140	Britt Dekker
5	23 December	4:50 pm	€3,581,305	Jan Kooijman
6	24 December	21:50	€8,621,004	Waylon

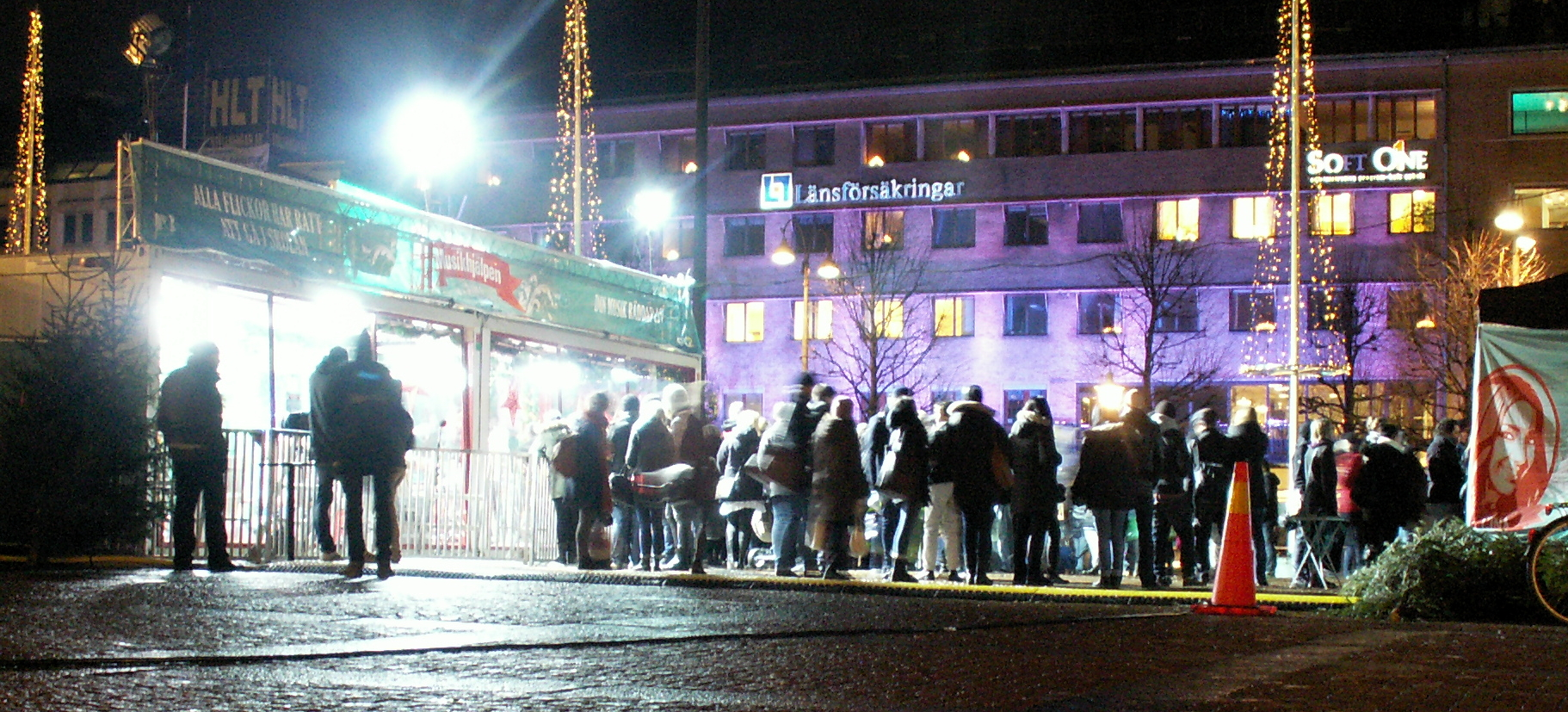
Musikhjälpen-house at Gustaf Adolfs Torg in Gothenburg 2011.

=== Sweden: Musikhjälpen 2011 ===
For 2011 Musikhjälpen moved to Gothenburg again, and was held from 12 to 18 December. Its theme was education for girls: "Alla flickor har rätt att gå i skolan" ("All girls have the right to go to school"). For the third time in a row, Jason Diakité (Timbuktu) hosted, this time together with Gina Dirawi and Kodjo Akolor. The appeal was again broadcast continuously on the Internet at SVT Play and SR P3 radio and time-permitting on SVT2 TV. Among 264 auctioned items was Michael Jackson's platinum record for his album Thriller. A total of 18,104,362 SEK was raised.

Flanders and Switzerland also had glass houses for different causes.

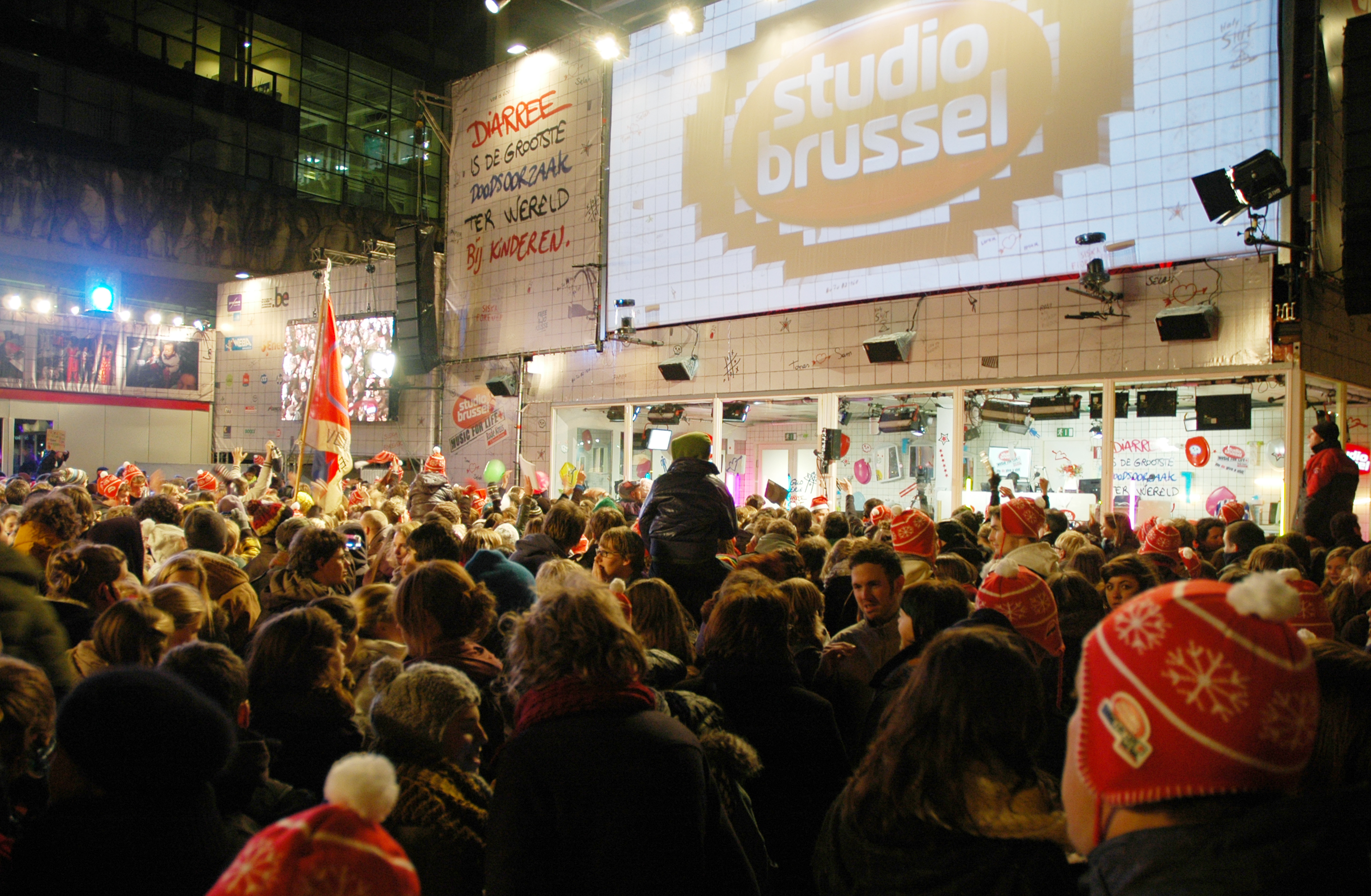
Music for Life house, 2011, Ghent

Results - 2011
Country	Project name	Results	Remarks
Belgium (Flanders)	Music For Life	€7,142,716	Proceeds to combat diarrhoea in children
Netherlands	Serious Request	€8,621,004	Proceeds to help mothers affected by war
Sweden	Musikhjälpen	18,104,362 Kr (€2,004,491)	Held one week earlier; proceeds to aid education for girls
Switzerland	Jeder Rappen zählt	7,309,824 Fr. (€5,157,567)	Held one week earlier; proceeds to aid mothers in need
Kenya	Serious Request	Participated in solidarity; encouraged the population to donate blood	
Total		€22,925,778	

== 2012 ==
=== Belgium: Music For Life 2012 ===
Radio station Studio Brussel chose a radical change in concept in 2012. Instead of raising funds, the focus was entirely on raising awareness, and breaking the perceived taboo and stigma's on dementia. In Belgium it is predicted that one in five persons wil eventually suffer from dementia. Although there was once again a round-the-clock broadcast from 17 to 23 December, there was no glass house, and no locked-up fasting hosts.

=== Kenya: Vote4Peace Vote4Kenya ===
In 2012 three Ghetto Radio DJs were locked in a "glass house" in central Nairobi, going six days without food while broadcasting non-stop to promote peaceful voting, ahead of the East African country's elections on 4 March 2013. From 19 to 24 December DJs Mbusii, Solloo and Essie went six days without food to advocate peaceful elections in Kenya—the first vote since the disputed elections in 2007, when violence engulfed the country leaving more than 1,000 people dead and 350,000 displaced, according to the Kenya Red Cross, and the country was nearly torn apart.

=== South Korea ===
For the first time, Serious Request was held in Seoul from 30 Nov. to 2 Dec. 2012. The appeal raised ₩411,634,460 (about €293,000) for the same goal as The Netherlands'. This benefit-event was organized by the Korean Red Cross in close collaboration with the public media, Korean Broadcasting System (KBS)(Korean: 한국 방송 공사, Hanguk Bangsong Gongsa), which is a South Korean radio and television network, founded in 1927.

This benefit-event was aimed at helping those most in need in South Korea by publicizing the newly launched nationwide campaign, Windmill of Hope (Korean: 희망풍차, Heemang-Poongcha). The Windmill of hope was created by the Korean Red Cross to provide customized integrated human services for the four major vulnerable groups (children the elderly, multicultural families and North Korean settlers) by directly connecting them with Red Cross volunteers and provided emergency livelihood support (housing, medical and educational) for families in crisis. Thus, this benefit-event was named as "Windmill of Hope SR".

=== The Netherlands: Let's Hear it for the Babies ===
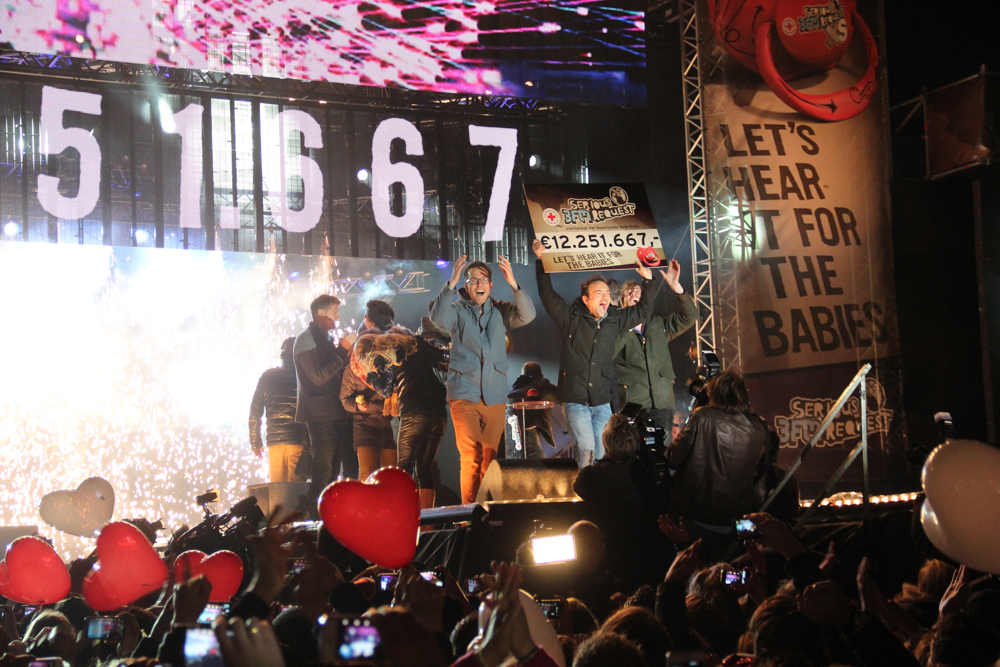
Dutch dj's with the final cheque.

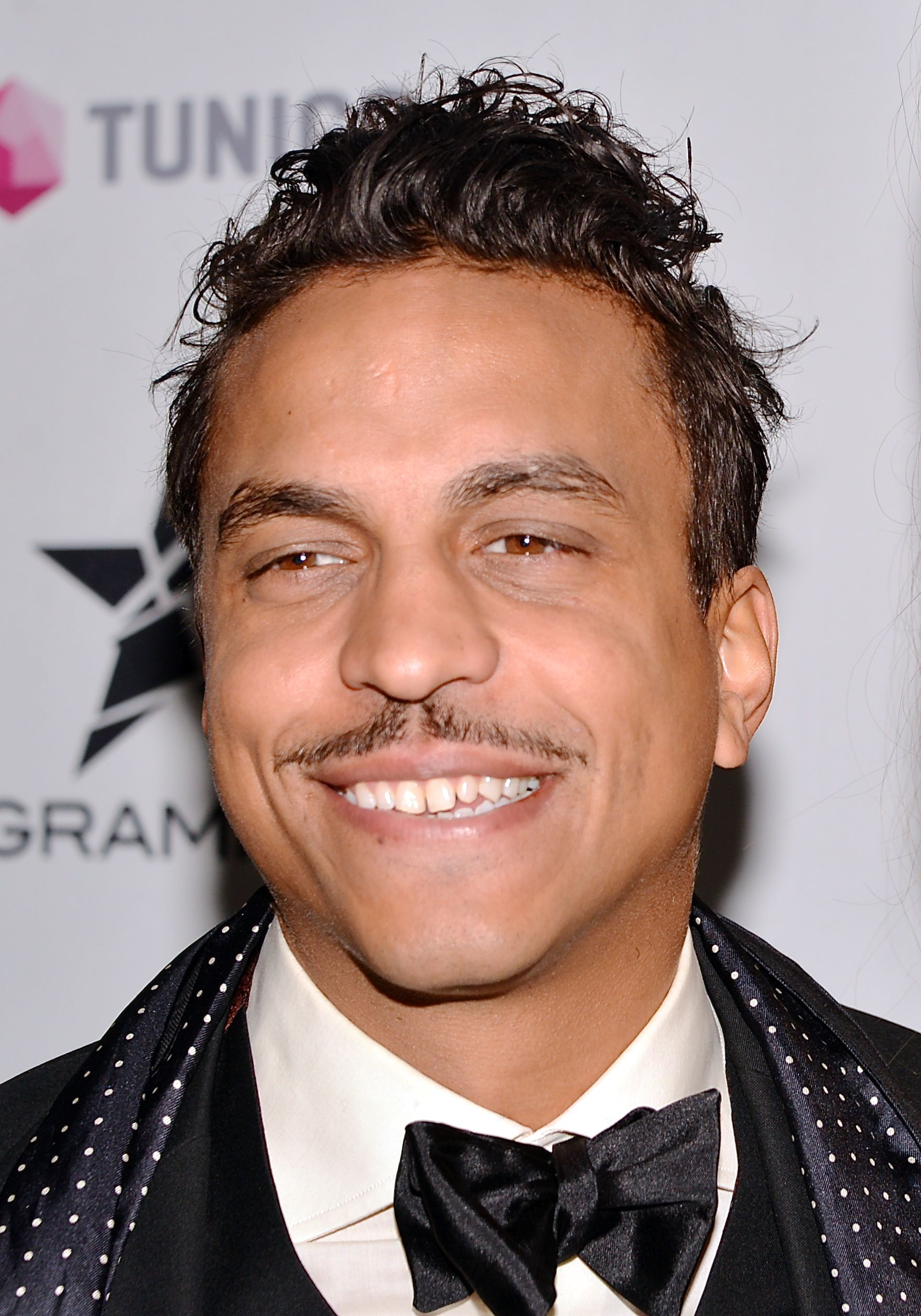
Swedish rapper Timbuktu (Jason Diakité) was a guest in 2008's Musikhjälpen, and co-hosted it four times since then

The glass house was in Enschede, and the goal was to reduce infant mortality. The host DJs were Giel Beelen, Gerard Ekdom and Michiel Veenstra.

Daily totals
Day		Time	Amount	Guest
1	18 December	8:30 pm		Frans Bauer
1	19 December	8:30 pm	€910,608	Gers Pardoel
2	20 December	8:30 pm	€1,752,907	VanVelzen
3	21 December	8:30 pm	€2,958,873	Sanne Hans
4	22 December	8:30 pm	€4,292,293	Johnny de Mol
5	23 December	8:30 pm	€6,142,180	Ilse DeLange
6	24 December	5:50 pm	€8,477,429	
6	24 December	9:30 pm	€12,251,667	

=== Sweden: Musikhjälpen ===
Musikhjälpen 2012 was held from 10 to 16 December in Malmö. Its theme was the right to clean water for children living in the slums ("Barnen i slummen har rätt till rent vatten"). The appeal was again broadcast continuously on the Internet at SVT Play and SR P3 radio and time-permitting on SVT2 TV. Once again its hosts were Jason Diakité (Timbuktu), Kodjo Akolor and Gina Dirawi. The show gathered 23,301,823 SEK.

== 2013 ==
In 2013 the Serious Request formula was deployed by RTBF, the public broadcaster of Wallonia, the French-speaking part of Belgium. Meanwhile, in Flanders, "Music For Life" returned to fund-raising, and to having a dedicated team of three DJs for six days. Alternately, in Switzerland it was decided to abandon the use of a glass house, and to move to several different locations during the event.

=== Belgium ===
==== Music For Life 2013 (Flanders) ====
For 2013 the Music For Life concept was again notably changed. It returned to fundraising by a team of three radio deejays broadcasting 24 hours a day. However, instead of a glass-walled studio cubicle, they would work from a winter campsite village, located in recreational ground De Schorre in Boom. People could not only visit, but also camp there overnight. Another big change was to abandon the focus on a central theme. Instead people were asked to contribute to any of 732 selected Belgian non-profit organizations. The motto was to let the donations make it De Warmste Week - the "Warmest Week" of the year. Hosts Siska Schoeters, Stijn Van de Voorde and Linde Merckpoel lived out in the cold for six days, playing requests and taking donations. After the sixth day at least €2,501,987 had been donated to the 732 charities, with some deposits still to come in. Some 1,850 fundraising initiatives by the public contributed to the result.

==== Viva for Life (Wallonia) ====
Wallonia, the French-speaking south of Belgium joined in the Serious Request movement in 2013. From 17 to 23 December radio station VivaCité operated by RTBF hosted "Viva For Life" from a Glass Cube in Liège with the slogan: La Musique a du Coeur (The Music has a Heart). For 144 hours presenters Sara De Paduwa, Raphaël Scaini and Sébastien Nollevaux broadcast, to raise funds for underprivileged children under the age of three in Belgium. An amount of €1,267,351 was raised.

=== Kenya: SupaDada ===
From 19 to 24 December again three presenters from Ghetto Radio locked themselves up in a glass house in Nairobi without food, playing requests and broadcasting a message of girls’ empowerment. The years buzz word ‘Supadada’ (‘Super sister’ in Kiswahili) expressed the focus on the situation of Kenya's young girls and young women, who face violence, rape, female genital mutilation and teen pregnancy. The three deejays Shii, Mary Kinyanjui and Lydia Njeri were all female, and the effort was furthered with music and dance performances, and large amounts of pink T-shirts, adorned with a Supadada mascot. Dutch deejay Giel Beelen was in daily contact with the Kenyan deejays. The Kenya Red Cross Society was one of the effort's sponsors.
Also girls in Kenya face many struggles with school attendance during their periods, as there is a lack of awareness and social acceptance of the necessity for sanitary towels and hygiene. Therefore, the 2013 campaign aimed to collect 12,000 packets of sanitary towels from the audience, to enable 1,000 girls to have perfect school attendance in 2014.

=== South Korea ===
The 2013 edition again had a glass house in Seoul, but the time-frame was moved to a 72-hour period from 21 December to Christmas Eve, and the house was an all new 6 metre cube, built to a design donated by Studio Gaon architects company. The KBS hosted appeal raised ₩1.45 billion (€1.08 million) for the country's Red Cross.

=== Netherlands: Let's Clean This Shit Up ===
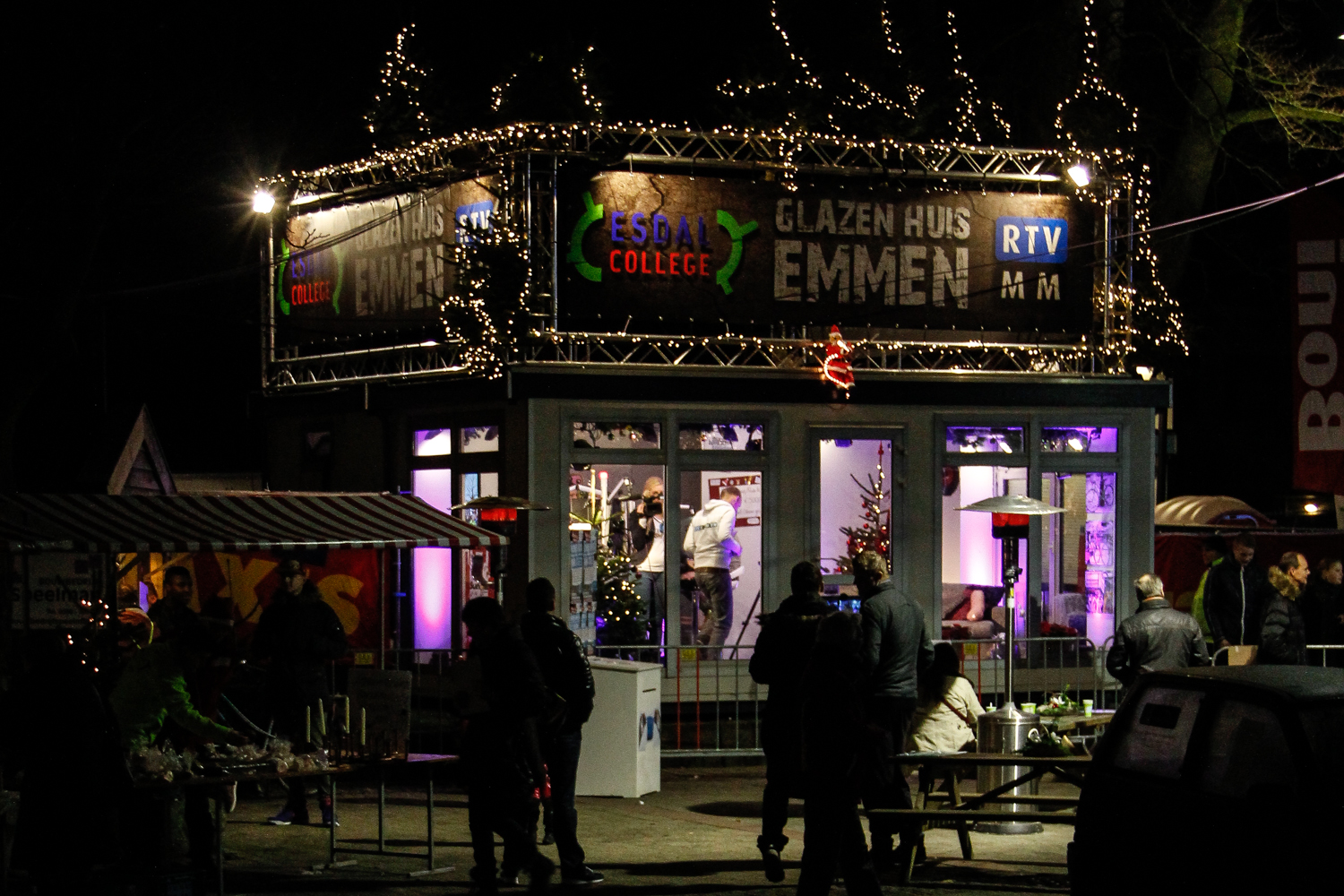
Secondary glass house, run by local radio station RTV in Emmen.

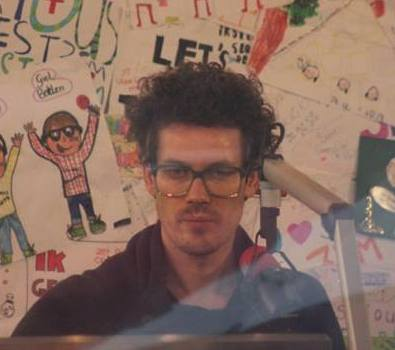
Paul Rabbering in the main house in 2013. He did a tour of various supporting houses the next year.

From 18 to 24 December 2013, radio 3FM broadcast from Leeuwarden in the province of Friesland with DJs Giel Beelen, Paul Rabbering and Coen Swijnenberg. The years campaign was against child death from diarrhea. Dutch gymnast and olympic champion Epke Zonderland symbolically locked the door, accompanied by a performance of Bastille. The theme song for the edition, Shoes of Lightning, was contributed by Dutch band Racoon.

For eleven days before the official broadcasts, i.e. 7–17 December 2013, DJs and so-called "rayonhoofden" ("district heads") traveled throughout the country under the title "Elfprovinciëntocht" ("Eleven provinces tour", referring to the Elfstedentocht, a Frisian tradition). Each day a different province was being called at. The locations were, in order of visits: Utrecht, Drenthe, Zeeland, Overijssel, Limburg, South Holland, Groningen, Flevoland, North Holland, Gelderland and North Brabant.

Daily totals
Day		Time	Amount	Guest
1	19 December	8:30 pm	€1,039,011	Anna Drijver
2	20 December	8:30 pm	€2,343,631	Jan Smit
3	21 December	8:30 pm	€3,054,689	Dennis Weening
4	22 December	8:22 pm	€4,328,242	Geraldine Kemper
5	23 December	8:20 pm	€6,232,307	Jacqueline Govaert and Laura Jansen
6	24 December	5:50 pm	€8,629,802	André Kuipers
6	24 December	8:08 pm	€ > 10,000,000	
6	24 December	9:27 pm	€12,302,747	

=== Sweden: Musikhjälpen ===
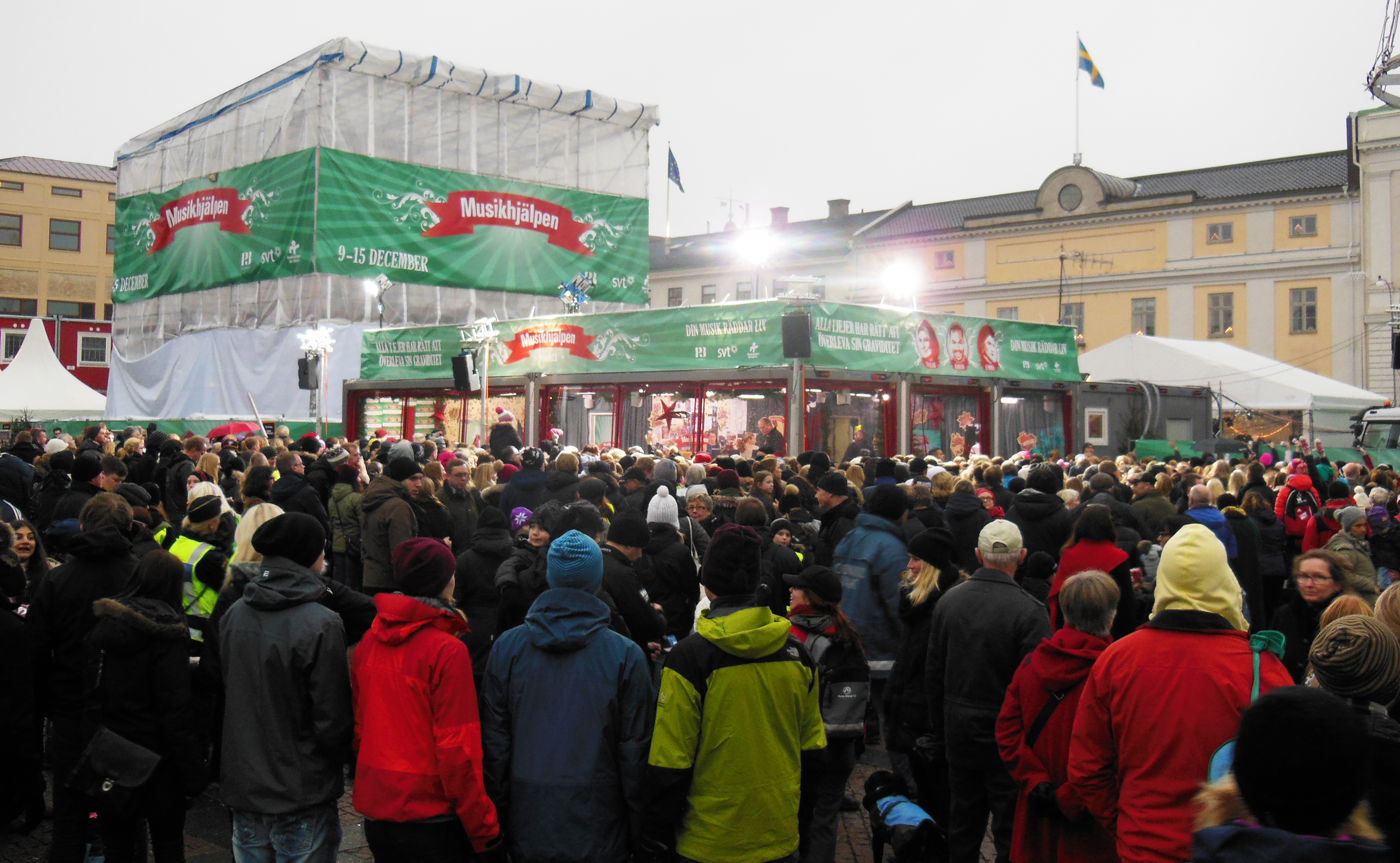
The glass house at Gustaf Adolfs torg in Gothenburg 2013.

Musikhjälpen 2013 was held from 9–15 December in Gothenburg. Its theme was girls right to safe pregnancies (Alla tjejers rätt att överleva sin graviditet). The appeal was again broadcast continuously on the Internet at SVT Play and SR P3 radio and time-permitting on SVT2 TV. Its hosts were Kodjo Akolor, Sarah Dawn Finer and Emma Knyckare. The show gathered 28,426,046 SEK (or €3,147,815).

=== Switzerland: Jeder Rappen zählt ===
For 2013 Jeder Rappen zählt in German-speaking Switzerland had the motto: Für Kinder in Slums, to help children in slums and raised 3,229,768 CHF (or €2,635,970). Radio station SRF 3 changed the concept and broadcast from their normal studio in Zurich the first two days. After that they took a mobile studio (but not the glass house) on a tour of Zurich, Basel, Aarau and St. Gallen. The hosting team consisted of Nik Hartmann and Mario Torriani in the SRF 3 studio, and Kathrin Hönegger and Judith Wernli in the mobile studio.

== 2014 ==
In 2014, Serious Request style fundraisers were held in three new countries: Austria, Latvia and Portugal. Switzerland returned to the established format with a stationary glass box housing three DJs for six days. In the Netherlands a growing number of secondary, supporting glass houses were created.

=== Austria: Ö3-Weihnachtswunder ===
From 19 to 24 December Austria's biggest radio station Hitradio Ö3 broadcast from a glass studio (the Wunschhütte or wishing hut) in the Kapitelplatz in Salzburg. For 120 hours Andi Knoll, Robert Kratky and Gabi Hiller hosted Ö3-Weihnachtswunder - wo jeder Wunschhit hilft (Ö3 Christmas miracle - where every wished hit helps) living on liquids and occasionally soup. Money was raised for the Licht ins Dunkel (Light in the Dark) association, for families in need. The project forms an addition to Ö3's benefit campaign Ö3-Wundertüte, held annually since 2004, and the Licht ins Dunkel 14-hour telethons held from Christmas Eve since 1978 on the station's parent, national public broadcaster ORF.
A combined amount of €1,075,582 was raised, including €617,582 achieved by playing song requests, and at least €458,000 from the Ö3-Wundertüte campaign, which was tied in. The event was opened with the song Wunder Gescheh'n (Miracles Happen) by singer Nena, and closed with Little Drummer Boy by Pentatonix, the most requested song.

=== Belgium ===
==== Music For Life 2014 (Flanders) ====
In 2014 the previous years concept was repeated unaltered. The hosts for the year, Sam De Bruyn, Linde Merckpoel and Vincent Byloo collected €2,727,405 for a total of 870 selected causes, and the event attracted almost 50,000 visitors to the musical campsite.

==== Viva for Life 2014 (Wallonia) ====
VivaCité broadcast 144 hours again from their Cube in Liège, with the same crew: Sara de Paduwa, Raphaël Scaini and Sébastien Nollevaux. This year an amount of €2,103,404 was raised for children born in poverty, both in Wallonia and in Brussels.

=== Kenya: Serious Request 2014 ===
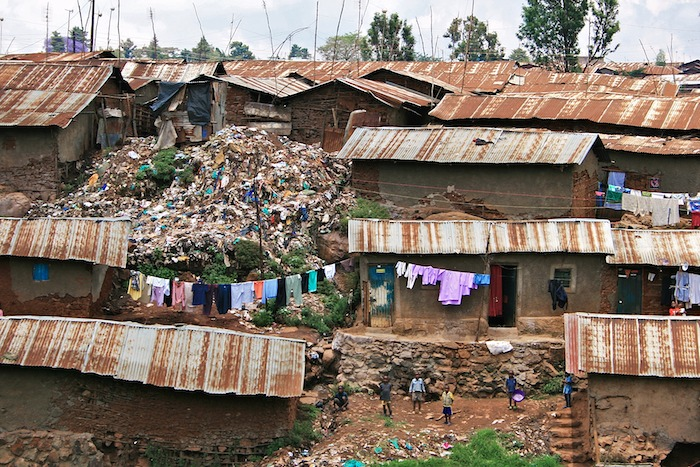
Dwellings in Kibera slum, Nairobi, Kenya (ca. 2008)

For 2014, Ghetto Radio 89.5 FM took its annual awareness campaign on a tour of three of the biggest slums in the Nairobi Area – Dandora, Kibera and Kawangware, combining stage performances from artists with their radio broadcasts. The year's theme was to educate the people there about the Kenyan constitution, because the majority of youth in Nairobi's slum areas have not read the constitution since its promulgation in 2010. Many young people don't understand the constitution and are not aware of their rights. For that reason, Ghetto Radio alternated entertainment with education from constitution expert Churchill Suba, in their Jukumu Letu tour. At the same time, booklets were distributed, with a simplified version of the constitution translated in Sheng (slang). One response from the public was: "[I] .. thought that the constitution was a document meant to benefit the people in power .. the rich and the politicians. Now I know that it is a document that should also assist me." The residents say the booklet which has translated a section of the constitution in Sheng has given them a great insight on their rights on security, health, education and employment issues.

=== Latvia: Dod Pieci! ===
From 17 to 23 December 2014, "Dod Pieci!" (Give Five!) was held in Riga (Latvia), raising money and awareness. Its theme was to remind the youth about the lonely seniors in the country (slogan: Ziedo senioriem un klausies savu dziesmu—Donate for seniors and listen to your song). Like other projects, it centered on radio broadcasts from a glass house; however, the Red Cross was not involved. The event was organized and broadcast by Latvijas Radio 5 (aka pieci.lv) and LTV television, as well as streamed live on the internet. The hosts were Latvia's Radio 5 DJ's Toms Grēviņš, Magnuss Eriņš and Kaspars Mauriņš. An amount of €64,550 was raised.

=== Netherlands: Hands Off Our Girls ===
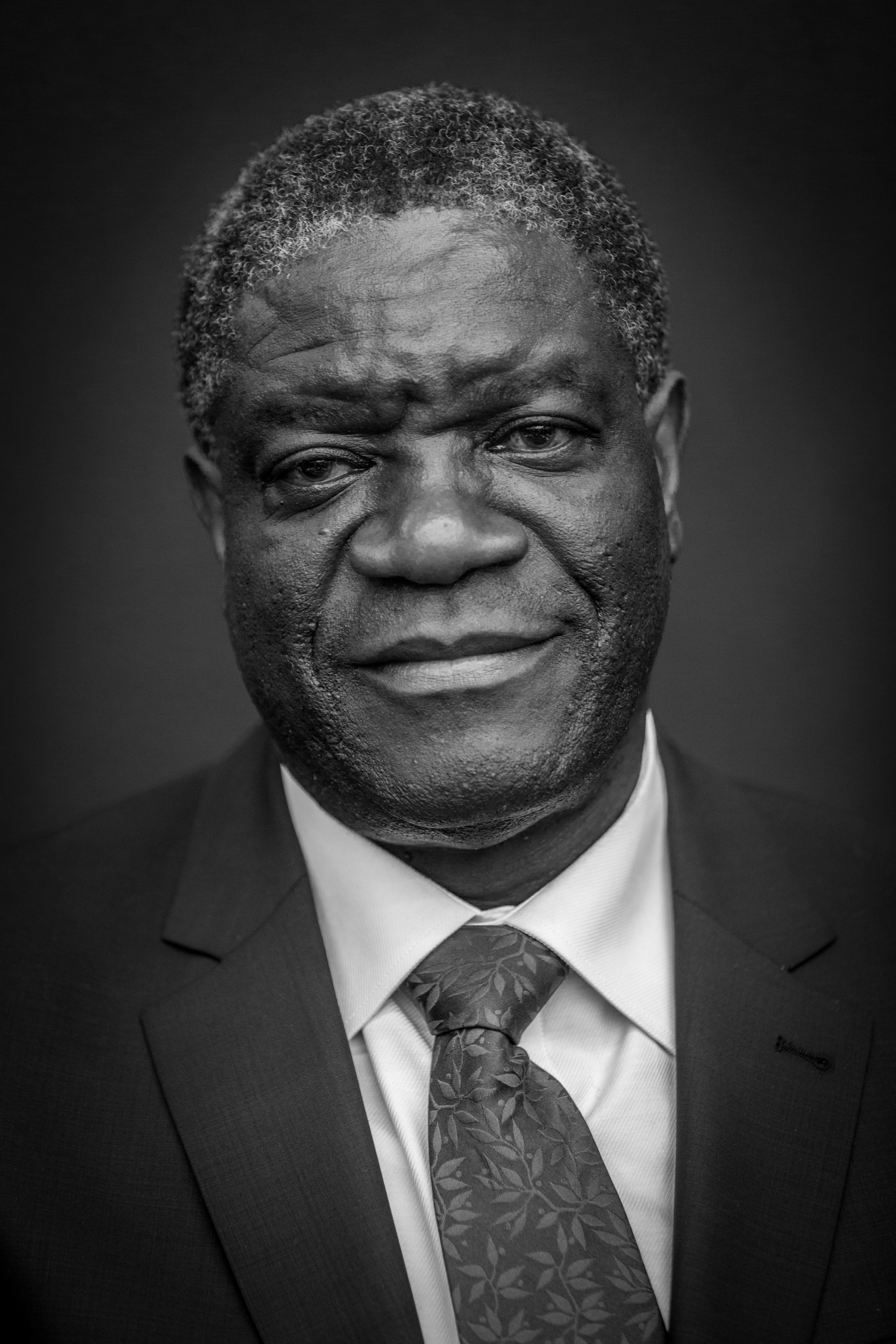
Dr. Denis Mukwege, Congolese gynecologist, specialized in treating women gang-raped by rebel forces.

3FM Serious Request 2014 took place 18–24 December, focusing on girls and women who are victims of sexual violence in wars and conflict areas. Aside from the Red Cross, €250,000 was donated to the War Child foundation, partially to support the Panzi Hospital of dr. Denis Mukwege in Congo, specialized in treating survivors of violence, the large majority of whom have been sexually attacked.

The Glass House was in Haarlem's main market square, where DJs Coen Swijnenberg, Gerard Ekdom and Domien Verschuuren lived for 6 days, broadcasting non-stop to raise donations and awareness. 80,000 to 100,000 visitors per day were expected to reach Haarlem for the event.
Although the glass house already featured two letterboxes for donations, waiting times for people standing in line to deposit were still unacceptably long, so a third letterbox was fitted during the event. Additionally, supporting glass houses were created by local and regional broadcasters in the towns of Apeldoorn, Echt, Emmen, Doetinchem, Lelystad, Nijkerk, Goirle & Riel, and East- and Westkapelle.

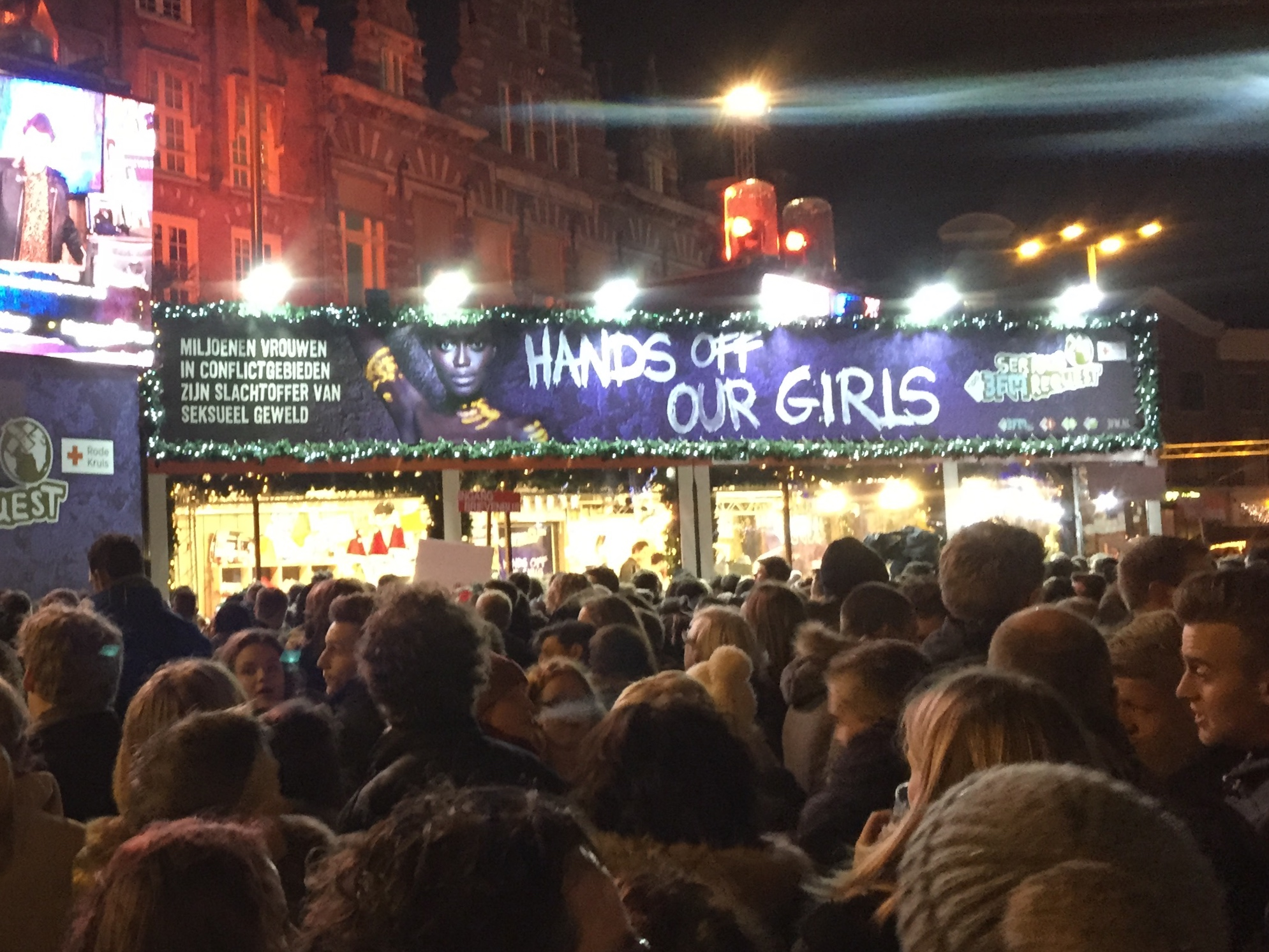
3FM Serious Request 2014 in Haarlem: Hands Off Our Girls

English singer Ed Sheeran donated a gold record earned for Dutch record-sales to be auctioned for the cause, as well as Irish singer Hozier who donated his platinum single award for "Take Me to Church". Also the mystery artist Gary Fomdeck announced that the revenue of his Christmas song I'll Be There This Christmas shall be donated to Serious Request.

Daily totals
Day		Time	Amount	Guest
1	19 December	8:30 pm	€1,125,334	Guus Meeuwis
2	20 December	8:30 pm	€2,402,675	Jacqueline Govaert
3	21 December	8:30 pm	€3,218,294	Johnny de Mol
4	22 December	8:30 pm	€4,588,750	Nick & Simon
5	23 December	8:20 pm	€6,301,612	Kensington
6	24 December	9:34 pm	€12,380,438	Jett Rebel

=== Portugal: Toca a Todos ===
Toca a Todos (It Touches Everybody) took place from 8 pm on 3 December to 9 pm on 6 December 2014 in Praça do Comércio, Lisbon, promoted by Antena 3 and its mother-company RTP, the Portuguese public broadcasting corporation. Fighting child poverty was chosen as theme for this first edition in Portugal. Asas Delta, by Portuguese band Clã, served as the anthem. Ana Galvão, Diogo Beja and Joana Marques, from Antena 3, hosted the 73-hour-long radio broadcast which included several musical showcases inside the glass studio, short interviews with musicians, actors, well-known personalities and representatives from several organizations, and live concerts on a stage just across the square. Cable television providers set-up channels for a simultaneous video broadcast from the glass studio. RTP1, the company's flagship television channel, also transmitted many live reports during the 3-day period. The initiative managed to fundraise 410,000 euros to be delivered to the official partner Cáritas Portuguesa.

=== South Korea: Serious Request ===
The 2014 edition was again held in Seoul for 72 hours from 21 December 17:00 to Christmas Eve 17:00, raising funds for the Korean Red Cross.

=== Sweden: Musikhjälpen ===
Musikhjälpen 2014 took place 8–14 December and for the first time the glass house was situated in Uppsala. Its theme was to stop the spreading of HIV / AIDS ("Hjälp oss att stoppa spridningen av hiv"). The appeal was again broadcast continuously on the Internet at SVT Play and SR P3 radio and time-permitting on SVT2 TV. Its hosts were Kodjo Akolor, singer Linnea Henriksson and rapper Petter Askergren. The show gathered a record-breaking 30,489,975 SEK.

=== Switzerland: Jeder Rappen Zählt 2014 ===
Jeder Rappen zählt returned to Lucerne from 17 to 23 December, with the motto: Für Familien auf der Flucht (For Refugee Families), to help families forced to flee their homes due to violence or armed conflicts. The concept returned to the formula of 2012 and earlier, because in 2013 the audience missed the Glasbox (glass box with the radio hosts) and its drop-slot for donations. Deejays Nik Hartmann, Philippe Gerber and Tina Nägeli stayed for six days and made 24/6 live radio, raising CHF 6,127,335.

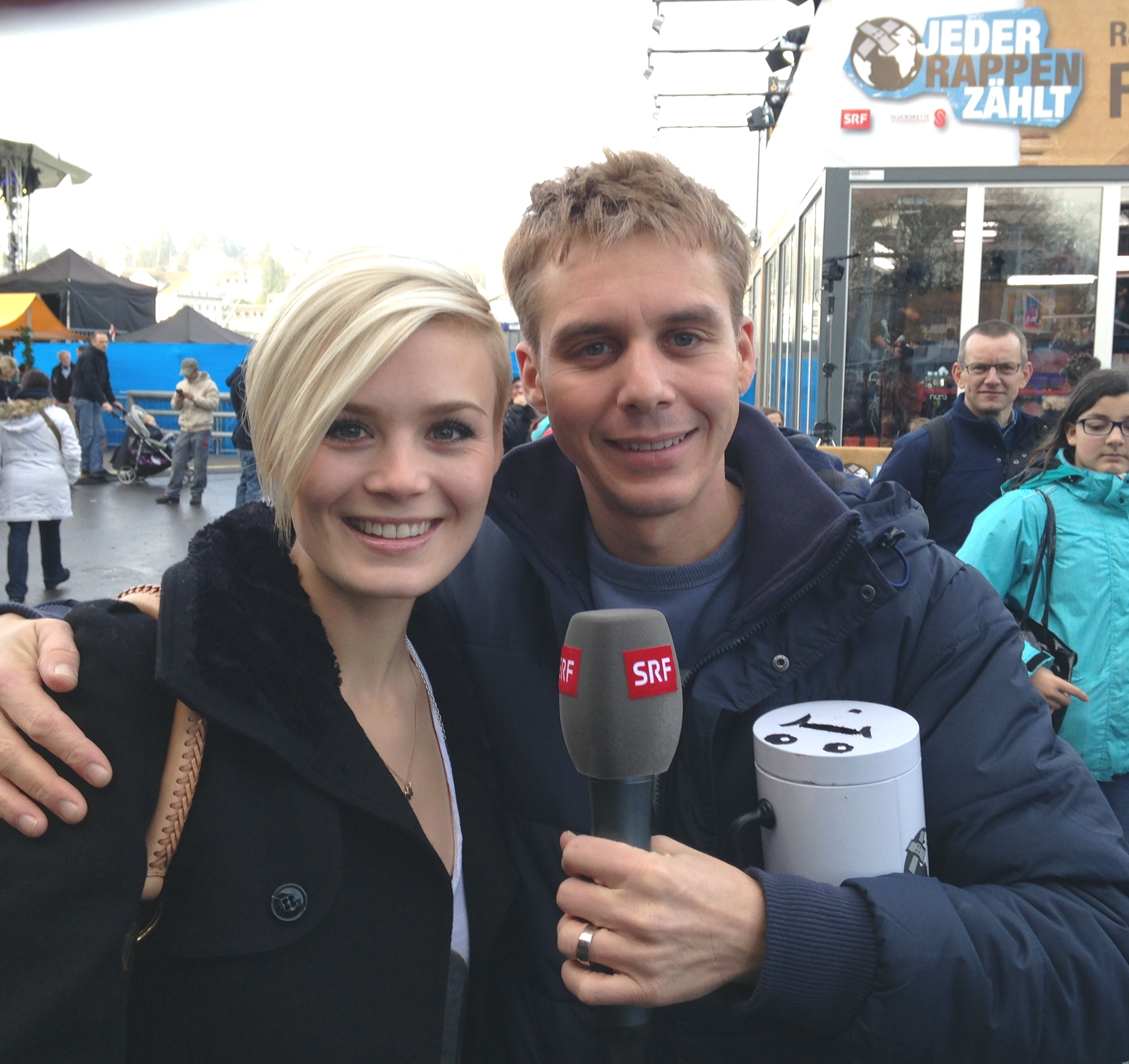
Dominique Rinderknecht and Reto Scherrer - Jeder Rappen Zählt 2014

Daily totals
Day		Time	Amount in CHF	Amount in €
1	17 December	4:30 pm	407,443.-	339,253
2	18 December	6:00 pm	874,197.-	726,077
3	19 December	6:00 pm	1,066,830.-	1,149,892
4	20 December	4:20 pm	2,089,173.-	1,736,058
5	21 December	4:20 pm	2,520,524.-	2,095,198
6	22 December	4:20 pm	3,854,166.-	3,203,262
7	23 December	7:00 pm	6,127,335.-	5,097,616

== 2015 ==
=== Austria ===
It was announced that this year's Ö3-Weihnachtswunder is going to be broadcast from Graz. The glass studio (the Wunschhütte or wishing hut) will be sitting at Mariahilferplatz from 19 to 24 December.

=== Belgium ===
==== Viva for Life 2015 (Wallonia) ====
The hosts for the year, Sébastien Nollevaux, Sara de Paduwa and Cyril collected €3,028,755 for one cause: childhood in poverty in Belgium. The edition of this year was in Charleroi.

==== Music For Life 2015 (Flanders) ====
The hosts for the year, Linde Merckpoel, Siska Schoeters and Eva De Roo collected €5,102,730 for a total of 1,045 selected causes, by organising 3,345 different collecting activities during "De Warmste Week" (The Hottest Week).

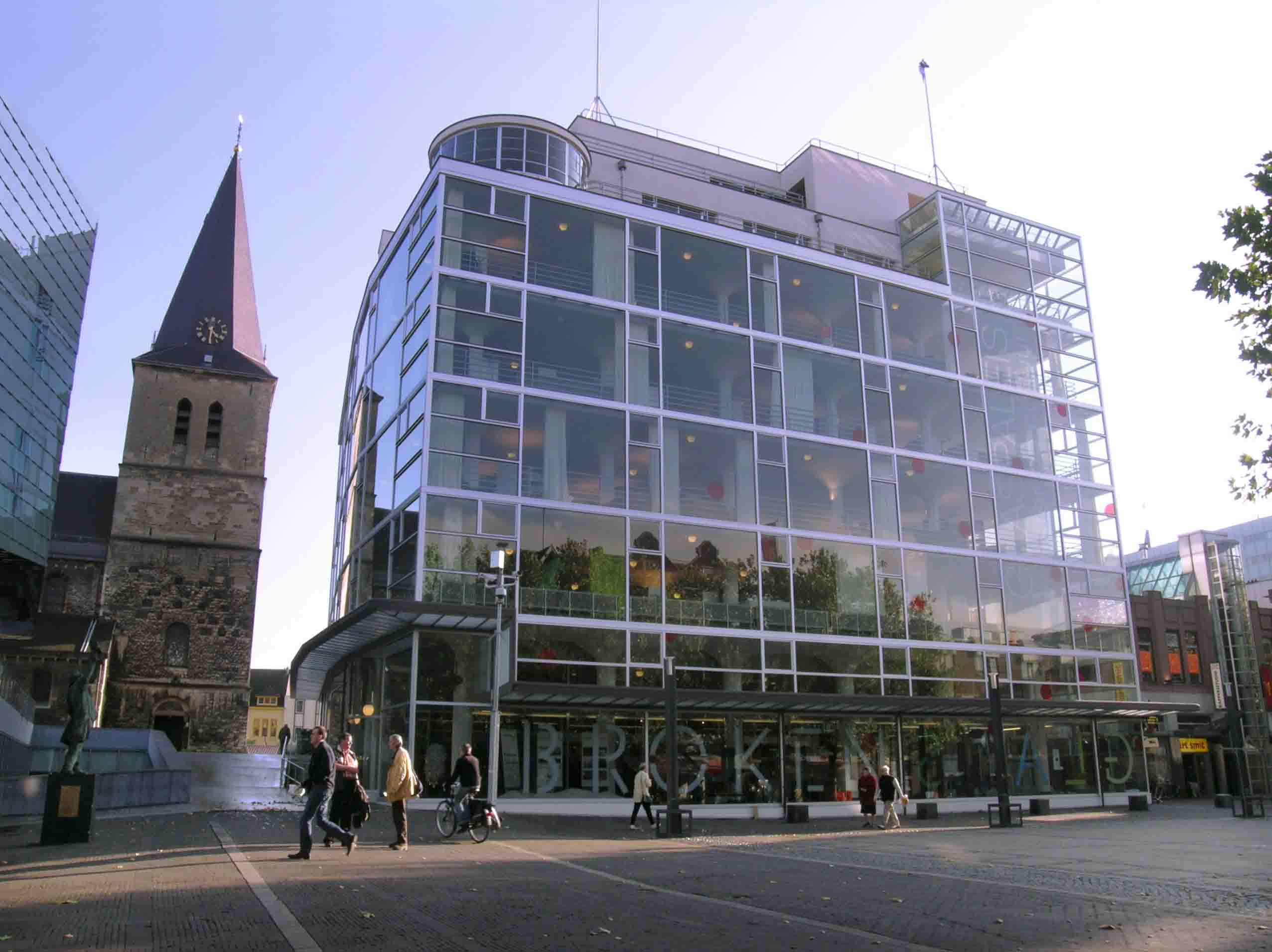
Former department store the Glass Palace in Heerlen

=== Netherlands ===
3FM Serious Request has been announced to broadcast from Heerlen in 2015, on Pancratius square, siting its Glass House in front of architectural monument the Glass Palace.

=== Portugal: Toca a Todos 2015 ===
Although on 6 December 2014, when closing that year's edition of Toca a Todos, it was announced that the initiative would return in 2015 to raise funds against domestic violence, it never took place.

=== Sweden: Musikhjälpen 2015 ===
On 20 May 2015 it was announced that Musikhjälpen 2015 for the first time would take place in Linköping from 13 to 19 December. The theme for the year was climate refugees and that nobody should have to escape the climate ("Ingen ska behöva fly klimatet"). The hosts for the year, Gina Dirawi, Kodjo Akolor and Linnea Henriksson collected 31 105 000 SEK.

=== Latvia: Dod Pieci 2015 ===
From 16 to 22 December 2015, once again "Dod Pieci!" (Give Five!) was held in the square by the Central Railway Station in Riga (Latvia), raising money and awareness. The theme for second edition of the marathon was families raising children with special needs and disabilities (slogan: Uzspied play un noņem ģimeni no pauzes—Press Play and Take The Family off The Pause).

Like previous year, it centered on radio broadcasts from a glass radio studio, commonly called The Glass House. The event was organized and broadcast by Latvijas Radio 5 (aka pieci.lv), Latvijas Radio 1 and LTV (Latvian Public Television), as well as streamed live on the internet. The hosts were the same as on first edition - Latvia's Radio 5 DJ's Toms Grēviņš, Magnuss Eriņš and Kaspars Mauriņš. The record amount of €135,546 was raised.

== 2016 ==
=== Sweden: Musikhjälpen 2016 ===
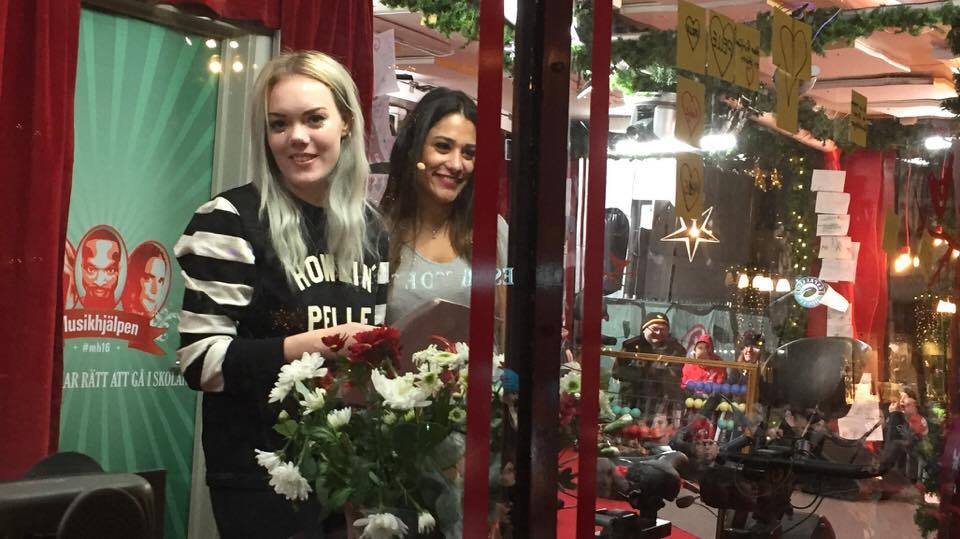
One of the show hosts, Josefine Jinder (Little Jinder) and co-host Farah Abadi in Musikhjälpen 2016, broadcast from Örebro.

Musikhjälpen was broadcast in 2016 for the first time from Örebro between 12 and 18 December. The hosts were Kodjo Akolor, musicians Pelle "Howlin' Pelle" Almqvist from The Hives and Josefine "Little Jinder" Jinder. This years public ambassadors were Farah Abadi and Oscar Zia. The travelling reporter for this edition was Molly Nutley who travelled to Africa to meet people that had fled the wars. 49 003 745 SEK was raised this year which was a new record. The theme for this year was that children in war have the right to go to school ("Barn i krig har rätt att gå i skolan").

== See also ==
- Jeder Rappen zählt (JRZ), the German Swiss version of Serious Request
- Musikhjälpen, the Swedish version of Serious Request
- Radio 2 Top 2000, another annual Dutch radio marathon in December, that reaches over half the population
