= Cœur à Cœur =

Charity marathon held every year in the French-speaking part of Switzerland

Cœur à Cœur (CÀC) (literally Heart-to-Heart) is the French Swiss version of Serious Request, originally created by Dutch radio station NPO 3FM in 2004.

The annually recurring show is a charity fundraiser for a chosen cause. As in the original Dutch version, several radio hosts or television personalities are locked inside a glass house for around a week. Every year, funds are collected in favour of Swiss Solidarity. The show is broadcast live in December on the Swiss public broadcasting organisation Radio Télévision Suisse (RTS).

The first edition, called Couleur Terre, took place in 2007 on Couleur 3. The show was then discontinued until 2016, when it returned with a new name and on other radio stations: Option Musique from 2016 to 2018 and La Première since 2019.

There was a similar format in the German-speaking part of Switzerland called Jeder Rappen zählt which was held every year until 2018.

== Summary ==
Period	Main broadcaster	City	Location	Personalities	Cause	Amount collected
Couleur Terre
2007; 19–24 December	Couleur 3	Geneva	Place de la Rôtisserie	Emilie Gasc; Yann Zitouni; Michel Ndeze	Access to drinking water	CHF 252'000
Cœur à Cœur
2016; 17–23 December	Option Musique	Lausanne	Place Centrale	Pauline Seiterle; Jonas Schneiter; Philippe Robin	People in need	CHF 1'230'276
2017; 16–22 December	Option Musique	Lausanne	Place Centrale	Pauline Seiterle; Jonas Schneiter; Philippe Robin	Young people in need	CHF 1'257'461
2018; 15–21 December	Option Musique	Lausanne	Place Centrale	Tania Chytil; Jonas Schneiter; Philippe Martin	Children victims of abuse	CHF 1'519'224
2019; 14–20 December	La Première	Sion	Place du Midi	Tania Chytil; Jonas Schneiter; Philippe Martin	Children victims of abuse	CHF 3'140'136
2020; 12–18 December	La Première	None ^{a}		Tania Chytil; Vincent Veillon; Philippe Martin	Children victims of abuse	CHF 2'028'186
2021	Not held					
2022; 17–23 December	La Première	None ^{b}		Tania Chytil; Jonas Schneiter; Philippe Martin	Children victims of abuse	CHF 1'718'983
2023; 16–22 December	La Première	Sion, Gruyères, Geneva, Montreux, Neuchâtel, Biel/Bienne & Delémont ^{c}		Tania Chytil; Jonas Schneiter; Philippe Martin	Education for children and young adults	CHF 4'329'701
2024; 14–20 December	La Première	Carouge, Morat, La Chaux-de-Fonds, Delémont, Biel/Bienne, Monthey & Yverdon-les-Bains ^{c}		Tania Chytil; Jonas Schneiter; Philippe Martin	Children victims of abuse	CHF 4'027'424
2025; 13–19 December	La Première	Gruyères, Carouge, Sion, La Chaux-de-Fonds, Porrentruy, Biel/Bienne & Yverdon-les-Bains ^{c}		TBD	TBD	CHF TBD

^{a} Because of the COVID-19 pandemic, the hosts weren't locked inside a glass house. Instead, they visited more than 60 locations all over Romandy.

^{b} Once again, there was no glass house. The hosts visited a different canton each day: Bern on Saturday, Valais on Sunday, Fribourg on Monday, Geneva on Tuesday, Vaud on Wednesday, Jura on Thursday and Neuchâtel on Friday.

^{c} These editions saw the return of the glass house, but it moved to a new city every day.

== See also ==
- Serious Request
- Jeder Rappen zählt
- Couleur Terre
