= JRZ =

JRZ may refer to:

- Jeder Rappen zählt, a Swiss live charity show (2009–2018)
- Jugoslavenska radikalna zajednica, a Yugoslav political party (1934–1941)
