= Jeder Rappen zählt =

Logo of Jeder Rappen zählt

Jeder Rappen zählt (JRZ) (literally Every rappen (nickel) counts) was the Swiss German version of Serious Request, originally created by Dutch radio station NPO 3FM in 2004.

First held in 2009, Jeder Rappen zählt was organized at the end of each year by Schweizer Radio und Fernsehen (SRF). It went through 10 editions before coming to an end in 2018.

The concept was as follows: a number of radio or television personalities were locked inside a glass house. The public could follow their adventures for around a week, with the show being broadcast live on radio and television. Every year, a special cause was chosen and funds were collected in favour of Swiss Solidarity.

This format also exists in the French-speaking part of Switzerland. The first edition, called Couleur Terre, took place in 2007. The radio show marathon came back in 2016 under a new name, Cœur à Cœur.

== Summary ==
Period	City	Location	Personalities	Cause	Amount collected
2009; 14–19 December	Bern	Bundesplatz	Mario Torriani; Nik Hartmann; Judith Wernli	Malaria	CHF 9'348'113
2010; 13–18 December	Bern	Bundesplatz	Tom Gisler; Nik Hartmann; Anic Lautenschlager	Children in conflict zones	CHF 8'996'326
2011; 12–17 December	Lucerne	Europaplatz	Nik Hartmann; Anic Lautenschlager; Kathrin Hönegger	Mothers in need	CHF 6'295'846
2012; 17–22 December	Lucerne	Europaplatz	Nik Hartmann; Kathrin Hönegger; Franziska von Grünigen	"Every drop helps": Access to clean water	CHF 7'243'703
2013; 16–20 December	Zurich; Basel; Aarau; St. Gallen	SRF Radio Studio; Münsterplatz (Basel); Bahnhofplatz Aarau; Blumenplatz St. Gallen	Mario Torriani; Judith Wernli; Kathrin Hönegger; Nik Hartmann	Slum children	CHF 2'174'874
2014; 17–23 December	Lucerne	Europaplatz	Nik Hartmann; Philippe Gerber; Tina Nägeli	Fleeing families	CHF 6'127'335
2015; 10–16 December	Bern	Bundesplatz	Nik Hartmann; Michel Birri; Anic Lautenschlager	Young people in need	CHF 4'109'635
2016; 18–23 December	Lucerne	Europaplatz	Stefan Büsser; Rosana Grüter^{a} Fabio Nay	Children fleeing alone	CHF 6'162'076
2017; 15–21 December	Lucerne	Europaplatz	Stefan Büsser; Tina Nägeli; Fabio Nay	Education – A Chance for children in need	CHF 5'093'456
2018; 15–21 December	Lucerne	Europaplatz	Anic Lautenschlager; Judith Wernli; Nik Hartmann	A roof over the head	CHF 5'706'310

^{a} Rosana Grüter was replaced by Tina Nägeli after two days into the show because of suffering from Laryngitis.
