= RTS Option Musique =

- Switzerland
- Broadcast area: Switzerland
- Frequencies: DAB, Satellite (Hot Bird), IPTV, Streaming

Ownership
- Owner: RTS Radio Télévision Suisse

History
- First air date: 1994

Links
- Webcast: ,
- Website: www.rts.ch/option-musique

RTS Option Musique is the fourth radio station operated by RTS Radio Télévision Suisse. The station was launched in 1994 and offers music programming along with popular French variety and contributes actively to the promotion of songwriters and performers in Switzerland. Every hour begins with a short news flash.

== History ==
Option Musique started broadcasting on 2 May 1994, at the initiative of Gérald Sapey. It broadcast on medium wave erplacing La Première, which moved entirely to FM.

== Reception ==
RTS Option Musique can be received on DAB and DAB+, cable, satellite (Hot Bird) and via the Internet. Until 6 December 2010, it was also available on medium wave (765 kHz) through the Sottens transmitter and until 31 December 2024, it was also available on FM in Geneva and Valais.

== See also ==
- Radio suisse romande
