= Foyer d'éducation de Prêles =

Cantonal reformatory in Berne, Switzerland (1920–2016)

- Formation: 1920
- Type: Reformatory
- Location: Prêles, Nods, Diesse, canton of Berne, Switzerland
- Region served: Canton of Bern
- Owner: Canton of Bern
- Formerly called: Maison d'éducation de la Montagne de Diesse; Maison de discipline de Trachselwald (predecessor)

The Foyer d'éducation de Prêles (also known as the Maison d'éducation de la Montagne de Diesse, and in German as the Erziehungsanstalt Tessenberg) was a reform school for boys aged 14 to 20 in the canton of Bern, Switzerland.

Created in 1920 and closed in 2016, it was located across the municipalities of Prêles, Diesse, and Nods on the Plateau de Diesse. Known successively as a maison de discipline (until around 1930), then a maison d'éducation, and finally a foyer d'éducation (from 1970), its history was marked by repressive practices that persisted until the early 1970s. Young people placed there came primarily from the canton of Berne and other regions: about two-thirds were committed under juvenile criminal law, and one-third under administrative detention or guardianship measures.

== History ==
=== Origins and establishment ===
The desire to separate young people from adults in prisons motivated the opening in 1892 of the first cantonal Bernese institution for juvenile detainees at Trachselwald (Emmental). After this facility quickly became overcrowded, the canton acquired in 1918 a 188-hectare plot of land at Prêles, Nods, and Diesse (in the Bernese Jura). In 1920, the Grand Council of Bern decreed the transfer of the maison de discipline from Trachselwald to the Montagne de Diesse (Tessenberg).

The central building, inaugurated at Prêles in 1927, was designed for 80 young people and was equipped with individual rooms, washbasins, and corridor showers. Additional buildings were subsequently constructed: the director's villa, a farm, staff quarters, pavilions, workshops, classrooms, and sports facilities. The institution's population grew from 70 to 110 young people between 1920 and 1950, before falling to around 60 from 1970 onwards.

=== Early direction: re-education through agricultural labor ===
The institution was financed by the Canton of Bern, supplemented by the sale and consumption of products from the farm and workshops. It was initially placed under the oversight of the prison commission, which approved the annual report and carried out inspections focused on order and hygiene. In 1940, a supervisory commission was established, comprising figures from the political and judicial worlds, a lawyer, a teacher, and local residents. The director was granted broad autonomy over internal organization.

Hans Anliker, a former schoolteacher and director from 1892 to 1940 of the establishments at Trachselwald and then the Montagne de Diesse, was an advocate of re-education through agricultural labor. At Prêles, new arrivals were put to work for several months on farm tasks, allowing staff to observe their physical and "moral" qualities. Half of the young residents, deemed unsuited to an apprenticeship, remained assigned to agricultural work indefinitely.

=== Luterbacher directorship (1940–1962) ===
Georges Luterbacher, an officer and agricultural engineer who served as director from 1940 to 1962, continued the approach of re-education through labor. Apprentices had access to internal vocational training in low-skilled trades, while more attractive occupations were introduced only gradually. Staff remained unspecialized; around 1950, a continuing education course on working with "difficult children" was offered to teachers only. Support services for young residents were expanded incrementally: a psychiatrist was added in 1953, a social worker in 1955, alongside the chaplaincy service and medical examination that had already existed at Trachselwald.

Luterbacher placed emphasis on leisure activities (both outdoor and indoor), but participation was integrated into a system of sanctions and rewards tied to residents' behavior. Those with the best records could take home leave, go to the village in civilian clothing, attend the cinema or sports events, or be housed in a pavilion with unbarred rooms. Those who were disobedient or had attempted to escape lost access to collective leisure, outings, and tobacco, and were confined to prison uniform.

New arrivals were rapidly subjected to very strict discipline. Witnesses attested to violence by several guards and a dehumanizing environment in which only a few sympathetic adults stood out. These methods were first denounced publicly in 1954 by journalist Jack Rollan in articles published in his satirical journal Le Bon Jour. Rollan described brutalizing labor, beatings, food restrictions, and solitary confinement, comparing Prêles to "Hitler's camps". Luterbacher brought a defamation case against him, with the support of the Bernese authorities. In 1956, Rollan was given a lenient sentence, while the director was fully exonerated and praised for his commitment.

=== Crisis and reform ===
Following the brief directorship of Paul Schnurrenberger-Brechbühler (1962–1965), the Cantonal Council appointed Kurt Gutknecht, a former deputy director, in 1965. He faced the institution's most serious crisis: at the end of 1969, following the suicide of two German-speaking young residents, investigative reports on Prêles appeared in Der Schweizerische Beobachter and the magazine Team, prompting interventions in the Grand Council of Berne. The scandal led to the appointment of an expert commission tasked with overseeing a comprehensive reform of the institution, which resulted in new facilities, the hiring of trained staff, and a differentiation of educational measures.

During the 1970s, Prêles was reorganised into a closed section for "particularly difficult" adolescents, a therapy house, semi-open premises, pavilions, open studios, and day-release studios. The annual report of 1975 noted the first diplomas obtained by three educators trained on the job.

=== Closure ===
Renovated and expanded at a cost of 37 million francs between 2010 and 2012, the Foyer d'éducation de Prêles nonetheless closed in 2016 due to under-occupancy. Several reuse projects were subsequently studied and then abandoned, including a deportation centre, asylum seeker accommodation, and a prison.

== Bibliography ==
- Galle, Sara; Hauss, Gisella: «Les scandales des placements d'enfants. Les maisons d'éducation sous les feux de la critique publique au début des années 1970», in: Mazbouri, Malik; Vallotton, François (dir.): Scandale et histoire, 2016, pp. 99–115.
- Des lois d'exception? Légitimation et délégitimation de l'internement administratif, 2019, pp. 309–315 (Publications de la Commission indépendante d'experts Internements administratifs, 3).
- «Zwangslagenleben». Biografien von ehemals administrativ versorgten Menschen, 2019 (Publications de la Commission indépendante d'experts Internements administratifs, 5).
- Matter, Sonja; Rietmann, Tanja: Gegen das Vergessen. Fürsorgerische Zwangsmassnahmen und Fremdplatzierungen in Nidwalden, 2024, pp. 129–130.
- Holenstein, Peter; Fritschi, Werner: «… wer einmal in der Winde frass… team report über Schweizer Erziehungsheime und Anstalten», in: Team. Zeitschrift der jungen Generation, 7.7.1970, pp. 9–24.
- Frioud, Philippe: Je t'accuse ma Suisse! Belle, riche, puissante, mais les mains pleines de sang des victimes des «internements administratifs», 2014.
- Giauque, David: «Pourquoi le foyer de Prêles ne se prête pas à l'accueil d'une prison», in: Infoprisons, n° 27, 2019.
