= Jorat-Menthue =

- Municipality
- Flag Coat of arms
- Location of Jorat-Menthue
- Location within Switzerland Location within Canton of Vaud
- Coordinates: 46°39′N 6°43′E
- Country: Switzerland
- Canton: Vaud
- District: Gros-de-Vaud

Government
  - Mayor: Syndic

Area
  - Total: 20.89 km^{2} (8.07 sq mi)

Population (2009)
  - Total: 69
  - Density: 3.3/km^{2} (8.6/sq mi)
- Time zone: UTC+01:00 (CET)
  - Summer (DST): UTC+02:00 (CEST)
- SFOS number: 5804
- ISO 3166 code: CH-VD
- Surrounded by: Froideville, Poliez-Pittet, Montilliez, Martherenges, Chapelle-sur-Moudon, Peyres-Possens
- Website: http://www.jorat-menthue.ch Profile (in French), SFSO statistics

Jorat-Menthue is a municipality in the district Gros-de-Vaud in the canton of Vaud in Switzerland.

The municipalities of Villars-Tiercelin, Montaubion-Chardonney, Sottens, Villars-Mendraz and Peney-le-Jorat merged on 1 July 2011 into the new municipality of Jorat-Menthue.

== History ==
Montaubion-Chardonney is first mentioned in 1200 as in Monte Albeonis. In 1223 Montaubion was mentioned as Montalbium and in 1223 Chardonney was mentioned as Chardenai. Sottens is first mentioned in 1147 as Sotens. Peney-le-Jorat is first mentioned around 1141-43 as Pinoy.

== Geography ==
Jorat-Menthue has an area, as of 2009, of 20.89 square kilometers (8.07 mi^{2}). Of this area, 11.86 km^{2} (4.58 mi^{2}) or 56.8% is used for agricultural purposes, while 7.55 km^{2} (2.92 mi^{2}) or 36.1% is forested. Of the rest of the land, 1.31 km^{2} (0.51 mi^{2}) or 6.3% is settled (buildings or roads), 0.01 km^{2} (2.5 acres) is either rivers or lakes and 0.01 km^{2} (2.5 acres) is unproductive land.

== Historic Population ==
The historical population is given in the following chart:

== Heritage sites of national significance ==
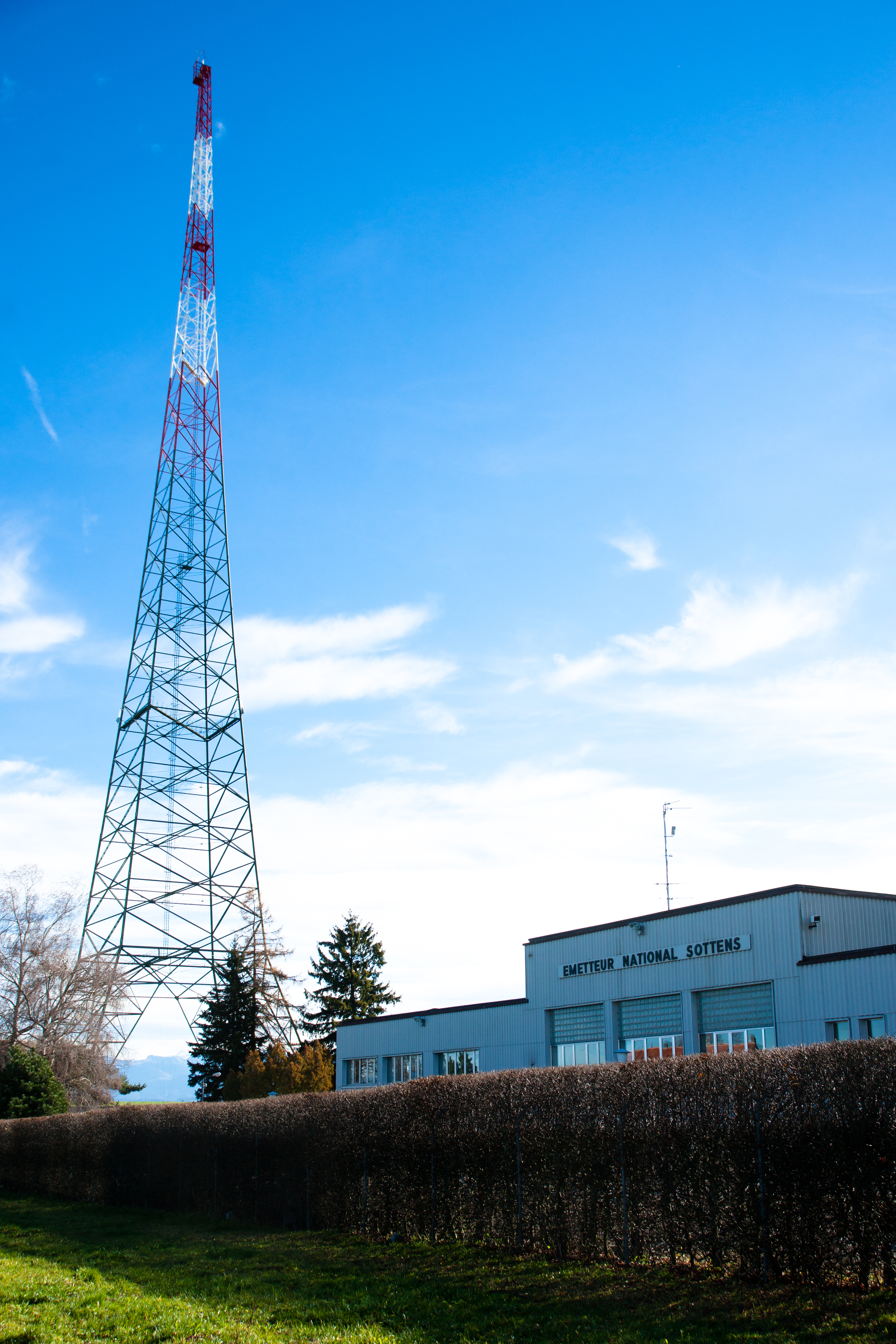
The Sottens transmitter

The Emetteur National De Sottens (Sottens transmitter) is listed as a Swiss heritage site of national significance.

The Sottens Transmitter is the nationwide transmitter for the French-speaking Radio Suisse Romande. It is easily receivable during the night throughout the whole of Europe.

== Weather ==
Villars-Tiercelin has an average of 130.4 days of rain or snow per year and on average receives 1,372 mm (54.0 in) of precipitation. The wettest month is November during which time Villars-Tiercelin receives an average of 129 mm (5.1 in) of rain or snow. During this month there is precipitation for an average of 10.9 days. The month with the most days of precipitation is May, with an average of 13.4, but with only 119 mm (4.7 in) of rain or snow. The driest month of the year is April with an average of 100 mm (3.9 in) of precipitation over 11.4 days.
