= Peney =

Peney may refer to:

- Peney, a place in the municipality of Satigny
- Peney-le-Jorat, a former municipality
