= Conservatorship =

Legal term and authority

Under U.S. law, a conservatorship results from the appointment of a guardian or a protector by a judge to manage the personal or financial affairs of another person who is incapable of fully managing their own affairs due to age or physical or mental limitations. A person under conservatorship is a "conservatee", a term that can refer to an adult. A person under guardianship is a "ward", a term that can also refer to a minor child. Conservatorship may also apply to corporations and organizations.

The conservator may be only of the "estate" (financial affairs) but may be also of the "person", wherein the conservator takes charge of overseeing the daily activities, such as healthcare or living arrangements of the conservatee. A conservator of the person is more typically called a legal guardian. In 2021, an estimated 1.3 million people in the U.S. were under conservatorship.

== Terminology ==
A person appointed to manage affairs is a conservator. A person under conservatorship is a conservatee. Under a guardianship, the appointed person is a guardian and subject person is a ward. When referring to government control of private corporations, conservatorship implies a more temporary control than does nationalisation.

Some jurisdictions, such as California, distinguish between conservatorship of an adult as compared to an unemancipated minor. Within such a jurisdiction, a person who is under what is more typically described as a guardianship may be described as a "conservator of the person". Other jurisdictions, such as New York, use the term guardianship in both contexts.

A "limited conservatorship" usually refers to the limited legal responsibilities of a conservator over the affairs of an individual who is developmentally disabled, but still capable of making important decisions for themselves. In these cases, the conservatee to whom the limited conservatorship applies can retain more control over their personal affairs than other conservatees can; for example, they may retain their right to decide where they may live.

== Appointment ==
Conservatorship is established either by court order (with regard to individuals) or via a statutory or regulatory authority (with regard to organizations such as business entities). In other legal terms, a conservatorship may refer to the legal responsibilities over a person who has a mental illness, including individuals who are psychotic, suicidal, demented, incapacitated, or in some other way unable to make legal, medical or financial decisions on behalf of themselves.

== Role and duties ==
Conservatorship is a legal term referring to the legal responsibilities of a conservator over the affairs of a person who has been deemed gravely disabled by the court and unable to meet their basic needs of food, clothing, and shelter. They are governed by the state's individual laws. Terminology varies, and some states or jurisdictions may refer to a conservator as a guardian of the estate or as a trustee.

Conservatorships are generally put in place for people who are significantly disabled by mental illness, elderly individuals who lack mental capacity due to medical conditions such as dementia, or individuals with developmental disabilities who lack the capacity to manage their own affairs. In typical conservatorship proceedings, an allegedly mentally incapacitated person must be evaluated by a qualified physician or psychiatrist who prepares a report documenting the person's mental capacity that is provided to the court and may be used as evidence.

An example of a conservator's duties includes: locating and marshalling assets, such as property and money, which belong to the conservatee; using the assets to buy food for the conservatee, secure and pay for placement in a facility which would take care of the conservatee or treat a mental illness, pay bills for the conservatee, manage property by paying for property insurance, mortgage payments or rent, property clean-up, or pay for a property management company to rent the property. An example of a conservator or guardian's medical responsibilities would be the court granting medical authority to the conservator or guardian, and the conservator or guardian authorising a physician to place a feeding tube to provide nourishment into the protected person's stomach if they are in medical need of it. It is not uncommon for one person to hold both offices and be referred to as the "guardian and conservator" of the conservatee, even though a conservator or guardian can be appointed over the person only, the estate only, or both. Generally, a conservator or guardian over the estate is only appointed if the conservatee has assets that need to be protected, marshalled, and managed. These terms may be found in use in Uniform Probate Code (UPC) jurisdictions, even though the UPC uses the term "protected person" in either case.

In most states, an outside party or agency must review the facts of the case and submit a report, usually required to be in writing, to the court before the court makes a decision on the request to establish a conservatorship or guardianship. Usually the outside party is a local county mental health representative called an investigator. They are often required to be experts in some appropriate field, such as social work, mental health, a medical field, or law. Procedures for conservatorship of an adult are often different from those for minors.

The court may appoint an attorney to represent the proposed conservatee or ward. If the proposed conservatee or ward is unable to have an attorney-client relationship because of some impairment, the court may appoint a guardian-ad-litem (who is often also an attorney). A guardian-ad-litem does not take instruction from the client, but rather acts on their behalf and tells the court what they think is in the best interests of the proposed conservatee or ward, whether or not that is what the proposed conservatee or ward wants. The conservatee has the right to be represented by an attorney, and if they cannot afford a private attorney, they are appointed a public defender that will represent them free of cost.

=== California ===
In the state of California there are two types of conservatorships: Lanterman–Petris–Short (Lanterman–Petris–Short Act of 1967, referred to as LPS) and Probate conservatorships. These forms of conservatorship are governed by the California Probate Code, and Welfare and Institutions Codes.

LPS conservatorships begin with a temporary 30-day conservatorship, and if the conservatee remains gravely disabled, the conservator is reappointed for a year; the LPS conservatorship can be renewed annually, or terminated if no longer needed. Probate conservatorships are referred to as "general conservatorships", and typically do not have a temporary period unless an urgent emergency exists that is creating risk to the person or their estate. Probate conservatorship do not automatically expire as LPS conservatorships do if they are not renewed by the conservator.

In an LPS conservatorship, a court-appointed conservator over the person is responsible for managing the conservatee's placement, medical decisions, and mental health treatment. A conservator over the estate is responsible for marshalling, protecting, and managing the conservatee's assets that remain in their estate. A conservator reports to the court that appointed them, and is monitored by the supervising judicial court in the county in which the conservatee permanently resides.

LPS conservatorships usually begin in the county mental health system and are referred from acute psychiatric hospitals, where Probate conservatorships can result from any referral source if validated with proper medical documentation. Mental Health consumers have the right to a Patient's Rights advocate, and are taken through a series of hearings while they are in the acute hospital before they reach the point of needing a conservator.

In 2022, a law was enacted requiring judges in California to document all alternatives to a conservatorship before granting one, giving potential conservatees in California preference in selecting a conservator, and making it easier to end probate conservatorships in California.

=== International equivalents ===
Conservatorship for individuals is called "deputyship" in England, Wales and in Switzerland (formerly "guardianship"), "guardianship" in Scotland, "controllership" in Northern Ireland, "guardianship" in India and "guardianship and administration" in Australia.

=== South Korea ===
In the Republic of Korea (South Korea) a Conservatorship is called a Guardianship.

Types of Guardians under Korean Guardianship Law

Adult guardian (성년후견인): If an adult chronically lacks the mental competence to manage their own matters due to illness, disability, old age, or other conditions, a Korean court may appoint an adult guardian. This type of guardianship in Korea gives near total power over the ward to the Adult Guardian.

Limited guardian (한정후견인): A person may also be designated as a "special guardian," entrusted with restricted authority over the ward's interests. For example, a special guardian may be granted the legal authority in Korea to decide how to handle the ward's assets without being granted any control over the ward's person.

Specified guardian (특정후견인): A specified guardian is a person appointed to represent a person's interests in relation to a particular court proceeding or process.

==== The process of appointing a guardian through Korean courts ====
The Korean Family Courts, typically, has the authority to appoint a guardian in Korea. A general adult guardian is one who is in charge of both the ward's financial interests and personal welfare. The Korean family court, or one of its branches, has authority over the ward's address and will hear the guardianship case. When the Family Court is not present in the ward's address, typically, a district court or a branch court has jurisdiction over the matter.

Typically, after an evaluation of the ward's health by a doctor, the court proceedings begin. The court will often question the ward and hear his/her testimony regarding the guardianship. So that the ward can make the most use of his or her remaining capacity and choose a suitable guardian. The court has the power to decide the beginning of guardianship, the choice of a guardian, change of guardian, cessation of guardianship, the extent of the legal representative's authority, etc.

== Conservatorship of organizations ==
In the United States, in some states, corporations can be placed under conservatorship, as a less extreme alternative to receivership. Whereas a receiver is expected to terminate the rights of shareholders and managers, a conservator is expected merely to assume those rights, with the prospect that they will be relinquished. Robert Ramsey and John Head, law professors who both specialise in financial issues, suggest that an insolvent bank should go into receivership rather than conservatorship to guard against false hope and moral hazard.

At the federal government level in the United States, in July 2008, the failing IndyMac Bank was taken into administrative receivership by the Federal Deposit Insurance Corporation (FDIC) and its assets and secured liabilities transferred to a specially established bridge bank called IndyMac Federal Bank, FSB which was placed into conservatorship, also by the FDIC.

Again, in the U.S. at the federal level, in September 2008, the chief executive officers and board of directors of Fannie Mae and of Freddie Mac were dismissed. Then, the companies were placed into the conservatorship of the Federal Housing Finance Agency (FHFA) via the determination of its director James B. Lockhart III, with the support and financial backing of U.S. Treasury via Treasury secretary Hank Paulson's commitment to keep the corporations solvent. The intervention leading to the conservatorship of these two entities has become the largest in government history, and was justified as necessary step to prevent the damage to the financial system that would have been caused by their failure. Entities like this are considered "too big to fail".

An even more ambitious use of the conservatorship model has been proposed by Duke University professors Lawrence Baxter, Bill Brown, and Jim Cox. They suggest that the troubled U.S. banks be placed in conservatorship, that some of their "good assets" be dropped into newly created "good bank" subsidiaries (presumably under new management), and the remaining "bad assets" be left to be managed under the supervision of a conservatorship structure.

== See also ==
- Legal guardian
- Power of attorney
- Receivership
- Custodial account
- Britney Spears conservatorship case
