= Swiss Solidarity =

Swiss nonprofit organization

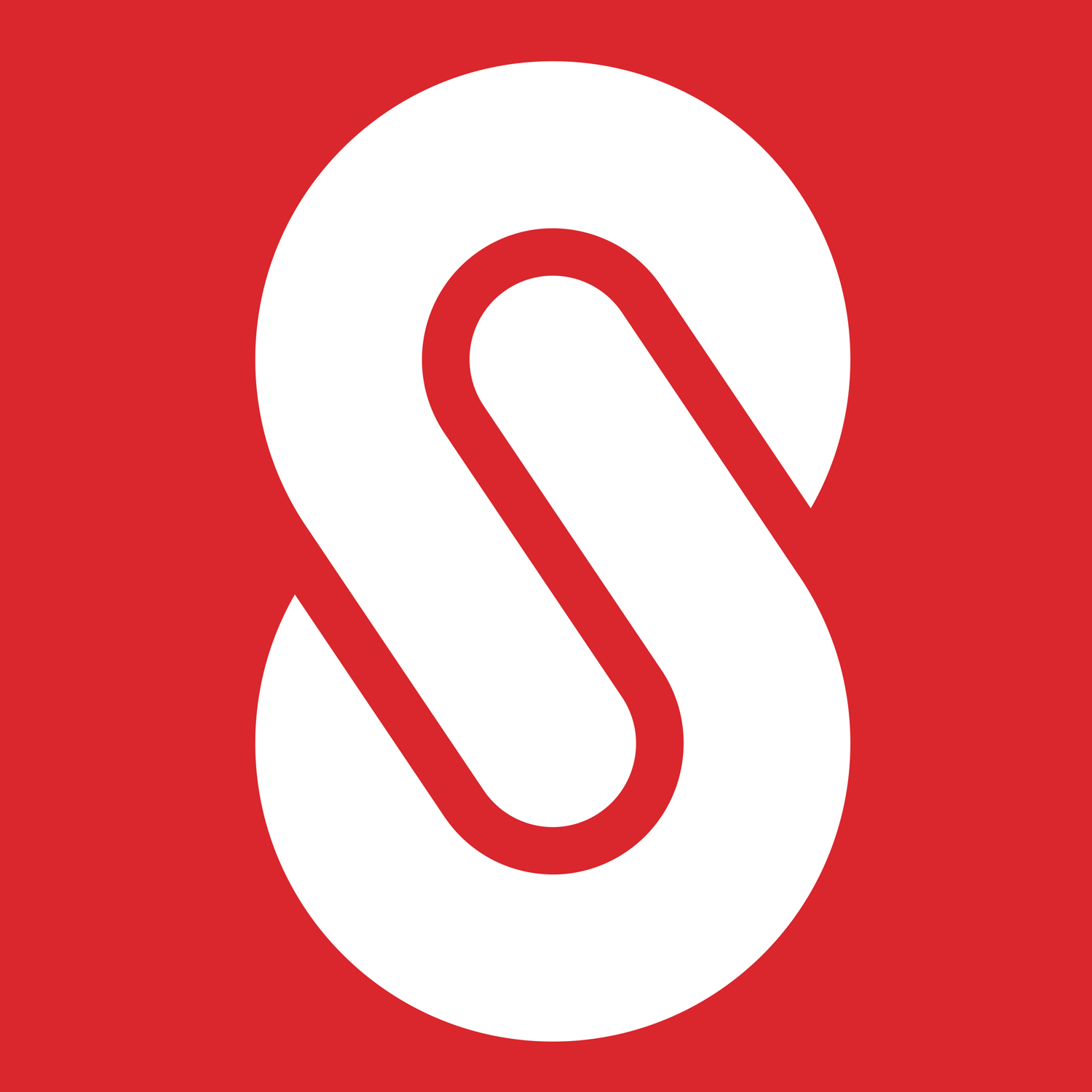
Corporate Design of Swiss Solidarity

Swiss Solidarity (German: Glückskette; French: Chaîne du Bonheur; Italian: Catena della Solidarietà; Romansh: Chadaina da Fortuna) is a Swiss nonprofit organization. Since 1946, Swiss Solidarity has embodied the solidarity reflex of the Swiss population. Together with SRG SSR, it mobilises the population and collects donations in the event of major natural disasters and conflicts, as well as for children's aid and for vulnerable people in Switzerland. The foundation is independent and ensures that donations are used carefully and efficiently in a transparent manner.

== History ==
1946 - Swiss Solidarity was originally a radio programme in French-speaking Switzerland on the national Radio Sottens (now RTS), which collected donations for the benefit of victims of disasters and war. It was launched in 1946, when Europe was scarred by the Second World War, by radio producer Roger Nordmann and entertainer Jack Rollan. With their first appeal on 26 September 1946, they wanted to help war-wounded children; in Switzerland, many people lived in poverty in the post-war period. Soon after, they created their own radio programme: the "Chaîne du Bonheur", in German "Glückskette". For whoever could best realise a wish was allowed to suggest the next good deed, thus the solidarity chain was not interrupted. The show's signature song was "La Gavotte", its refrain was: "Y'a du bonheur pour tout le monde!" ("Happiness is for everyone!").

1947 - Although Swiss Solidarity on the Radio originated in French-speaking Switzerland, a year later it was broadcast from studios in Basel and Lugano and enthusiasm for the radio solidarity chain spread throughout Switzerland. In German-speaking Switzerland, Swiss Solidarity launched its first collection in Basel on 19 October 1947 in aid of Swiss soldiers who had been poisoned by machine-gun oil.

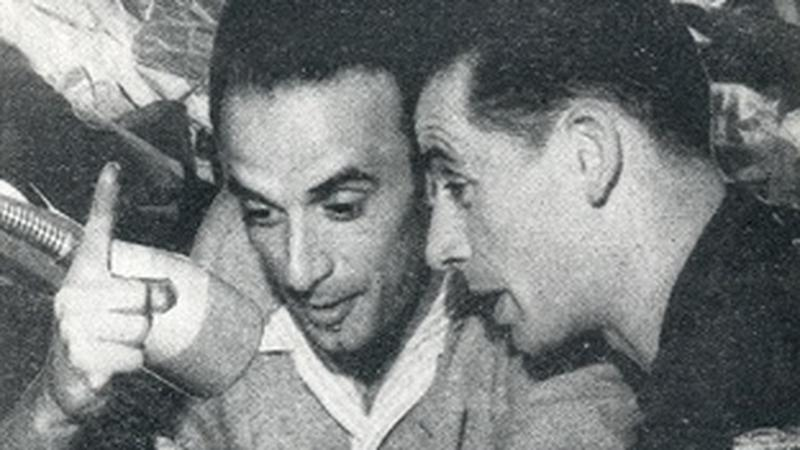
Lohengrin Filipello (right) and Sergio Maspoli during the first edition from Radio Monte Ceneri

1948 - Swiss Solidarity is also taken over by Radio Beromünster and Radio Monte Ceneri and broadcast throughout Switzerland. In addition to the three Swiss radio stations, media from Paris, Trieste, Vienna, Monte Carlo and Baden-Baden also participated in the project. In the same year, negotiations were started with America about an intercontinental chain of fortune. According to estimates, the stations were able to reach about 250 million listeners in Europe in 1949. Swiss Solidarity launches its first appeal for donations, also raising Fr. 80,000 for the victims of the Mitholz explosion disaster.

1983 - Since 1983 it has had the legal form of an independent foundation.

1991- From 1991 to 2010, Roland Jeanneret was the "voice of Swiss Solidarity" at fundraising events in German-speaking Switzerland. Swiss media often referred to him as "Mister Swiss Solidarity".

2004 - A seaquake shook Asia. Hundreds of Thousands of people were killed or injured through the catastrophe and over 1.7 million coastal residents around the Indian Ocean were left homeless. The Swiss people's solidarity response was incredible: in December 2004, 227.7 million Swiss francs were collected for the victims.

2008 - Swiss Solidarity founded the Emergency Appeals Alliance (EAA) with nine organisations with similar structures and activities from Austria, Belgium, Canada, Germany, Italy, Japan, the Netherlands, Sweden and the United Kingdom. Spain joined later.

2013 - Swiss Solidarity gets a new visual identity. As Swiss Solidarity embodies Switzerland's solidarity reflex, this positioning is also to be expressed in the name. Swiss Solidarity is given the signature "Switzerland in solidarity".

2019 - Swiss Solidarity dedicated its 250th collection to women victims of forgotten crises.

2020 - In response to the pandemic that has completely turned the world upside down, Swiss Solidarity launches a fundraising campaign. A total of 43,457,744 was collected for the Coronavirus Switzerland fundraising campaign.

2022 - In March 2022, the Swiss people once again showed their solidarity - 130 million were collected for the victims of the war in Ukraine.

== Projects ==
In partnership with the Swiss Broadcasting Corporation (SRG SSR) and private media, Swiss Solidarity collects donations for humanitarian aid projects. Swiss Solidarity benefits from the special support and media coverage of public radio and television. The money collected is used to support relief projects run by experienced Swiss relief organisations in immediate and rehabilitation aid as well as sustainable reconstruction.

The majority of the projects support reconstruction after earthquakes, hurricanes or other natural disasters. Swiss Solidarity also appeals for donations for victims of wars and conflicts and is committed to the well-being of children.

In Switzerland, Swiss Solidarity works with local partners when there are gaps in the Swiss social system, helping people in need, especially adolescents and young adults between the ages of 15 and 25 who need help with social and professional integration.

Special project commissions have been formed to review, approve and monitor the longer-term projects. Ensuring that projects are monitored is essential for Swiss Solidarity. It places particular emphasis on accountability and transparency.

== Foundation bodies ==
The organs of the Foundation include the Foundation Board, as the supreme body, with a maximum of fourteen members the Foundation President the Swiss Solidarity Committee, with five members the Finance and Investment Commission (COGEFI) the Project/Programme Commissions (COPRO International and COPRO Switzerland) the Accreditation Commission the Swiss Solidarity Executive Board and the Auditors.

== Foundation Board ==
The Foundation Board consists of a maximum of 14 members, half of whom are representatives of SRG SSR and half of whom are representatives of Swiss Solidarity's partner relief organizations and/or humanitarian aid.

A Committee of the Foundation Board with five representatives supervises and monitors the management of the Swiss Solidarity Directorate and supports it in its activities. The Director, the President of the Finance and Investment Commission, the President of the Swiss Project Commission and the President of the International Project Commission sit on the Foundation Board and the Committee in an advisory capacity.

== Project Commission ==
The commission is made up of independent humanitarian aid experts, representatives of partner relief organisations and Swiss Solidarity management. They cover all relevant areas of expertise such as health, construction, water and sanitation, child protection and economics. The project commission is chaired by an independent person. In the commission meeting, the projects are first analysed in detail and then discussed in depth. The decision-making body within the project commission then makes the funding decision.

== Swiss Solidarity's biggest fundraising appeals ==
Since the establishment of the Swiss Solidarity Foundation in 1983, more than two billion donations have been collected to date. The ten largest collections were for two natural disasters, two wars abroad and three storms in Switzerland.

1. Seaquake in Asia (tsunami), December 2004: 227.7 million Swiss francs

2. War in Ukraine, March 2022: 130.6 million Swiss francs [2].

3. Storms in Switzerland (Valais, Gondo and Ticino), October 2000: 74.2 million Swiss francs

4. Earthquake in Haiti, January 2010: 66.2 million Swiss francs

5. War victims in Kosovo, April 1999: 49.5 million Swiss francs

6. Severe weather in Switzerland (Central Switzerland, Bernese Oberland and Grisons), August 2005: 49.5 million francs

7. COVID-19 in Switzerland, April 2020: 44.3 million Swiss francs

8. Typhoon Haiyan, Philippines, November 2013:. 42.3 million Swiss francs

9. Floods Pakistan / Asia, August 2010: 42.1 million Swiss francs

10. Severe weather in Switzerland, August 1987: 40.6 million Swiss francs

From 2009 to 2018, SRF and Swiss Solidarity organised the annual fundraising campaign "Jeder Rappen zählt" (Every cent counts) in December.

== The most extraordinary collections ==
- 1946: Thanks to the generosity of the audience, English war orphans were invited to Switzerland for a holiday.
- 1947: The first national collection was made in aid of soldiers poisoned by machine oil. Poisoning by the cooling oil, which was mistakenly used as cooking oil, led to severe consequential damage, including paralysis of the legs. Around 100 people became victims of this mistake.
- 1948: Chocolate collection for the benefit of the elderly
- 1948: Swiss Solidarity collects used felt hats from which patients and convalescents make slippers. The aim of the project is "to give patients the courage to face life and the strength to recover through work and the opportunity to earn an income".
- 1951: Collection of wool for the benefit of people suffering from the cold.
- 1975: The Air Bonheur campaign organises a week of holidays on Mallorca for poor pensioners

== Swiss partner organisations ==
Swiss Solidarity itself does not act operationally, but cooperates with 25 organisations abroad: Adventist Development and Disaster Aid (ADRA), Médecins Sans Frontières Switzerland (MSF), Brücke/Le Pont, Caritas Switzerland, CBM Christoffel Blindenmission, Christian Peace Service (CDF), Enfants du Monde (EDM), Fondation Hirondelle, Helvetas, Hilfswerk der Evangelischen Kirchen der Schweiz (HEKS), Medair, Iamaneh Switzerland, Médecins du Monde, Save the Children, Swiss Red Cross (SRC), Solidarmed, Solidar Suisse, SOS Children's Villages Switzerland, Pestalozzi Children's Foundation, Swissaid, Terre des hommes - Kinderhilfe weltweit, Terre des Hommes Schweiz, Terre des Hommes Suisse, Vétérinaires Suisse (VSF-Suisse) and Vivamos Mejor.

== Awards ==
Swiss Solidarity received the International Human Rights Award 1999 in recognition of its work. The award honored its humanitarian actions and in particular the organisation's aid in Kosovo.

== The SRG Ambassadors of Swiss Solidarity ==
For many years, the programme "Glückskette aktuell" was the Sunday programme for SRF 1 listeners: Roland Jeanneret and later Ladina Spiess, the former voices of Swiss Solidarity in German-speaking Switzerland, reported on the use of the donations, sometimes live from the disaster areas. The role of SRF ambassador for Swiss Solidarity was taken over by Dani Fohrler in 2018. Jean-Marc Richard, Swiss Solidarity ambassador in French-speaking Switzerland, often mentions Swiss Solidarity and its activities in his broadcasts. In Italian-speaking Switzerland, Carla Norghauer is the voice of the appeal for donations on RSI. In Graubünden, Claudia Cathomen takes on this task at RTR.
