= Hermenches =

- Municipality
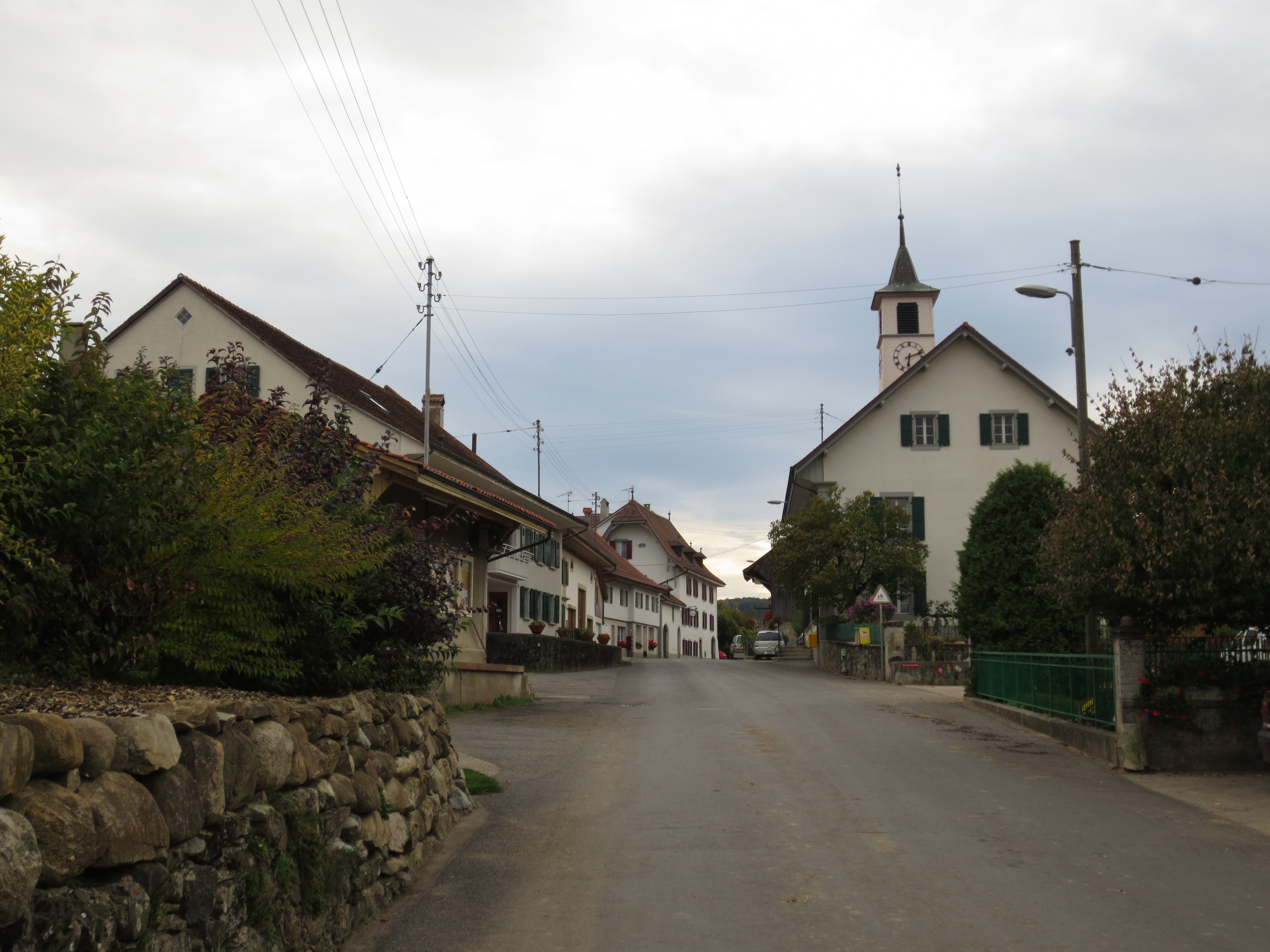

- Flag Coat of arms
- Location of Hermenches
- Location within Switzerland Location within Canton of Vaud
- Coordinates: 46°38′N 6°46′E
- Country: Switzerland
- Canton: Vaud
- District: Broye-Vully

Government
  - Mayor: Syndic

Area
  - Total: 4.77 km^{2} (1.84 sq mi)
- Elevation: 679 m (2,228 ft)

Population (2003)
  - Total: 291
  - Density: 61.0/km^{2} (158/sq mi)
- Time zone: UTC+01:00 (CET)
  - Summer (DST): UTC+02:00 (CEST)
- Postal code: 1513
- SFOS number: 5673
- ISO 3166 code: CH-VD
- Surrounded by: Corcelles-le-Jorat, Moudon, Peney-le-Jorat, Ropraz, Rossenges, Sottens, Syens, Vucherens
- Website: www.hermenches.ch

Hermenches is a municipality in the district Broye-Vully in the canton of Vaud in Switzerland.

== History ==
Hermenches is first mentioned in 1254 as Ermenges.

== Geography ==
Hermenches has an area, as of 2009, of 4.77 square kilometers (1.84 sq mi). Of this area, 3.1 km^{2} (1.2 sq mi) or 65.0% is used for agricultural purposes, while 1.37 km^{2} (0.53 sq mi) or 28.7% is forested. Of the rest of the land, 0.3 km^{2} (0.12 sq mi) or 6.3% is settled (buildings or roads).

Of the built up area, housing and buildings made up 3.6% and transportation infrastructure made up 2.5%. Out of the forested land, 27.3% of the total land area is heavily forested and 1.5% is covered with orchards or small clusters of trees. Of the agricultural land, 44.2% is used for growing crops and 20.1% is pastures.

The municipality was part of the Moudon District until it was dissolved on 31 August 2006, and Hermenches became part of the new district of Broye-Vully.

It consists of a number of scattered hamlets.

== Coat of arms ==
The blazon of the municipal coat of arms is Per bend Gules and Vert, overall on a Garb Or a Dove sejant Argent.

== Demographics ==
Hermenches has a population (as of December 2020) of 382. As of 2008, 8.7% of the population are resident foreign nationals. Over the last 10 years (1999–2009 ) the population has changed at a rate of 24.3%. It has changed at a rate of 16.8% due to migration and at a rate of 6.4% due to births and deaths.

Most of the population (as of 2000) speaks French (271 or 95.4%), with German being second most common (6 or 2.1%) and Italian being third (2 or 0.7%).

Of the population in the municipality 99 or about 34.9% were born in Hermenches and lived there in 2000. There were 98 or 34.5% who were born in the same canton, while 40 or 14.1% were born somewhere else in Switzerland, and 31 or 10.9% were born outside of Switzerland.

In 2008 there were 9 live births to Swiss citizens and were 4 deaths of Swiss citizens. Ignoring immigration and emigration, the population of Swiss citizens increased by 5 while the foreign population remained the same. There was 1 Swiss man who emigrated from Switzerland. At the same time, there was 1 non-Swiss man who immigrated from another country to Switzerland. The total Swiss population change in 2008 (from all sources, including moves across municipal borders) was an increase of 7 and the non-Swiss population decreased by 1 people. This represents a population growth rate of 1.8%.

The age distribution, as of 2009, in Hermenches is; 41 children or 11.8% of the population are between 0 and 9 years old and 40 teenagers or 11.5% are between 10 and 19. Of the adult population, 24 people or 6.9% of the population are between 20 and 29 years old. 56 people or 16.1% are between 30 and 39, 62 people or 17.8% are between 40 and 49, and 41 people or 11.8% are between 50 and 59. The senior population distribution is 43 people or 12.4% of the population are between 60 and 69 years old, 28 people or 8.0% are between 70 and 79, there are 13 people or 3.7% who are between 80 and 89.

As of 2000, there were 124 people who were single and never married in the municipality. There were 133 married individuals, 11 widows or widowers and 16 individuals who are divorced.

As of 2000, there were 112 private households in the municipality, and an average of 2.4 persons per household. There were 34 households that consist of only one person and 7 households with five or more people. Out of a total of 113 households that answered this question, 30.1% were households made up of just one person. Of the rest of the households, there are 31 married couples without children, 40 married couples with children. There were 6 single parents with a child or children. There was 1 household that was made up of unrelated people and 1 household that was made up of some sort of institution or another collective housing.

In 2000 there were 38 single family homes (or 47.5% of the total) out of a total of 80 inhabited buildings. There were 13 multi-family buildings (16.3%), along with 26 multi-purpose buildings that were mostly used for housing (32.5%) and 3 other use buildings (commercial or industrial) that also had some housing (3.8%). Of the single family homes 15 were built before 1919, while 8 were built between 1990 and 2000. The most multi-family homes (4) were built before 1919 and the next most (3) were built between 1981 and 1990.

In 2000 there were 115 apartments in the municipality. The most common apartment size was 4 rooms of which there were 36. There were 3 single room apartments and 44 apartments with five or more rooms. Of these apartments, a total of 104 apartments (90.4% of the total) were permanently occupied, while 10 apartments (8.7%) were seasonally occupied and 1 apartments (0.9%) were empty. As of 2009, the construction rate of new housing units was 2.9 new units per 1000 residents. The vacancy rate for the municipality, in 2010, was 1.5%.

The historical population is given in the following chart:

== Politics ==
In the 2007 federal election the most popular party was the SVP which received 27.42% of the vote. The next three most popular parties were the SP (22.29%), the FDP (17.8%) and the Green Party (10.85%). In the federal election, a total of 94 votes were cast, and the voter turnout was 42.5%.

== Economy ==
As of 2010, Hermenches had an unemployment rate of 1%. As of 2008, there were 27 people employed in the primary economic sector and about 12 businesses involved in this sector. 1 person was employed in the secondary sector and there was 1 business in this sector. 17 people were employed in the tertiary sector, with 5 businesses in this sector. There were 137 residents of the municipality who were employed in some capacity, of which females made up 38.0% of the workforce.

In 2008 the total number of full-time equivalent jobs was 32. The number of jobs in the primary sector was 16, all of which were in agriculture. The number of jobs in the secondary sector was 1, which was in manufacturing. The number of jobs in the tertiary sector was 15. In the tertiary sector; 1 was in the sale or repair of motor vehicles, 2 or 13.3% were in education and 11 or 73.3% were in health care.

In 2000, there were 5 workers who commuted into the municipality and 99 workers who commuted away. The municipality is a net exporter of workers, with about 19.8 workers leaving the municipality for every one entering. Of the working population, 4.4% used public transportation to get to work, and 70.1% used a private car.

== Religion ==
From the 2000 census, 49 or 17.3% were Roman Catholic, while 150 or 52.8% belonged to the Swiss Reformed Church. Of the rest of the population, there were 3 members of an Orthodox church (or about 1.06% of the population), and there were 13 individuals (or about 4.58% of the population) who belonged to another Christian church. There were 3 (or about 1.06% of the population) who were Islamic. There was 1 person who was Buddhist. 53 (or about 18.66% of the population) belonged to no church, are agnostic or atheist, and 12 individuals (or about 4.23% of the population) did not answer the question.

== Education ==
In Hermenches about 117 or (41.2%) of the population have completed non-mandatory upper secondary education, and 27 or (9.5%) have completed additional higher education (either university or a Fachhochschule). Of the 27 who completed tertiary schooling, 51.9% were Swiss men, 29.6% were Swiss women.

In the 2009/2010 school year there were a total of 43 students in the Hermenches school district. In the Vaud cantonal school system, two years of non-obligatory pre-school are provided by the political districts. During the school year, the political district provided pre-school care for a total of 155 children of which 83 children (53.5%) received subsidized pre-school care. The canton's primary school program requires students to attend for four years. There were 26 students in the municipal primary school program. The obligatory lower secondary school program lasts for six years and there were 16 students in those schools. There were also 1 students who were home schooled or attended another non-traditional school.

As of 2000, there were 21 students from Hermenches who attended schools outside the municipality.
