= Sottens =

- Former municipality
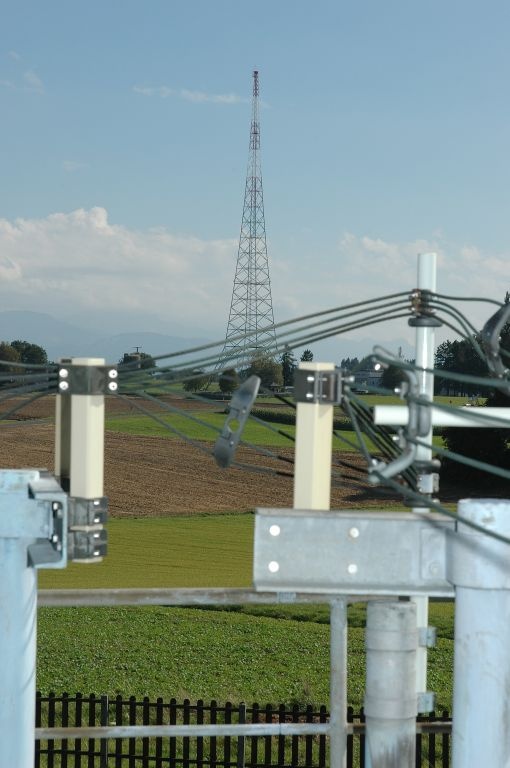
- Sottens transmitter

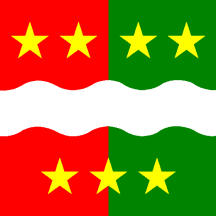
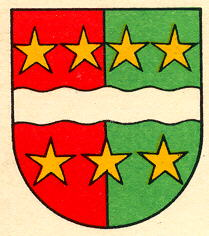
- Flag Coat of arms
- Location of Sottens
- Location within Switzerland Location within Canton of Vaud
- Coordinates: 46°39′N 6°45′E
- Country: Switzerland
- Canton: Vaud
- District: Gros-de-Vaud

Area
  - Total: 4.53 km^{2} (1.75 sq mi)
- Elevation: 755 m (2,477 ft)

Population (December 2009)
  - Total: 257
  - Density: 56.7/km^{2} (147/sq mi)
- Time zone: UTC+01:00 (CET)
  - Summer (DST): UTC+02:00 (CEST)
- Postal code: 1062
- SFOS number: 5687
- ISO 3166 code: CH-VD
- Surrounded by: Chapelle-sur-Moudon, Hermenches, Martherenges, Montaubion-Chardonney, Moudon, Peney-le-Jorat, Peyres-Possens, Villars-Mendraz
- Website: Profile (in French), SFSO statistics

Sottens is a former municipality in the district of Gros-de-Vaud in the canton of Vaud in Switzerland.

It is known for its radio transmitter for the French language Swiss radio, built in 1931.

The municipalities of Villars-Tiercelin, Montaubion-Chardonney, Sottens, Villars-Mendraz and Peney-le-Jorat merged on 1 July 2011 into the new municipality of Jorat-Menthue.

== History ==
Sottens is first mentioned in 1147 as Sotens.

== Geography ==
Sottens has an area, as of 2009, of 4.5 square kilometers (1.7 mi^{2}). Of this area, 2.96 km^{2} (1.14 mi^{2}) or 65.3% is used for agricultural purposes, while 1.32 km^{2} (0.51 mi^{2}) or 29.1% is forested. Of the rest of the land, 0.27 km^{2} (0.10 mi^{2}) or 6.0% is settled (buildings or roads).

Of the built up area, housing and buildings made up 2.4% and transportation infrastructure made up 2.6%. Out of the forested land, all of the forested land area is covered with heavy forests. Of the agricultural land, 47.5% is used for growing crops and 17.4% is pastures.

The municipality was part of the Moudon District until it was dissolved on 31 August 2006, and Sottens became part of the new district of Gros-de-Vaud.

The former municipality is located in the Gros-de-Vaud, auf einem Plateau des Jorat zwischen Echallens und Moudon gelegen district. It consists of the village of Sottens and the hamlets of Bez. Gros-de-Vaud, auf einem Plateau des Jorat zwischen Echallens und Moudon gelegen..

== Coat of arms ==
The blazon of the municipal coat of arms is Per pale Gules and Vert, overall a Bar wavy Argent surrounded with seven Mullets of Five Or four and three.

== Demographics ==
Sottens has a population (as of 2009) of 257. As of 2008, 9.1% of the population are resident foreign nationals. Over the last 10 years (1999-2009 ) the population has changed at a rate of 20.7%. It has changed at a rate of 15.5% due to migration and at a rate of 4.7% due to births and deaths.

Most of the population (as of 2000) speaks French (180 or 85.7%), with German being second most common (15 or 7.1%) and Portuguese being third (12 or 5.7%). There is 1 person who speaks Italian.

Of the population in the municipality 63 or about 30.0% were born in Sottens and lived there in 2000. There were 79 or 37.6% who were born in the same canton, while 31 or 14.8% were born somewhere else in Switzerland, and 34 or 16.2% were born outside of Switzerland.

In 2008 there were 4 live births to Swiss citizens and were 2 deaths of Swiss citizens. Ignoring immigration and emigration, the population of Swiss citizens increased by 2 while the foreign population remained the same. At the same time, there was 1 non-Swiss man who emigrated from Switzerland to another country. The total Swiss population change in 2008 (from all sources, including moves across municipal borders) was an increase of 8 and the non-Swiss population decreased by 3 people. This represents a population growth rate of 2.2%.

The age distribution, as of 2009, in Sottens is; 34 children or 13.2% of the population are between 0 and 9 years old and 31 teenagers or 12.1% are between 10 and 19. Of the adult population, 22 people or 8.6% of the population are between 20 and 29 years old. 51 people or 19.8% are between 30 and 39, 41 people or 16.0% are between 40 and 49, and 32 people or 12.5% are between 50 and 59. The senior population distribution is 27 people or 10.5% of the population are between 60 and 69 years old, 15 people or 5.8% are between 70 and 79, there are 3 people or 1.2% who are between 80 and 89, and there is 1 person who is 90 and older.

As of 2000, there were 87 people who were single and never married in the municipality. There were 102 married individuals, 8 widows or widowers and 13 individuals who are divorced.

As of 2000 the average number of residents per living room was 0.57 which is about equal to the cantonal average of 0.61 per room. In this case, a room is defined as space of a housing unit of at least 4 m² (43 sq ft) as normal bedrooms, dining rooms, living rooms, kitchens and habitable cellars and attics. About 45% of the total households were owner occupied, or in other words did not pay rent (though they may have a mortgage or a rent-to-own agreement).

As of 2000, there were 84 private households in the municipality, and an average of 2.5 persons per household. There were 22 households that consist of only one person and 5 households with five or more people. Out of a total of 84 households that answered this question, 26.2% were households made up of just one person. Of the rest of the households, there are 25 married couples without children, 34 married couples with children There were 2 single parents with a child or children. There was 1 household that was made up of unrelated people.

In 2000 there were 33 single family homes (or 51.6% of the total) out of a total of 64 inhabited buildings. There were 13 multi-family buildings (20.3%), along with 16 multi-purpose buildings that were mostly used for housing (25.0%) and 2 other use buildings (commercial or industrial) that also had some housing (3.1%). Of the single family homes 10 were built before 1919, while 9 were built between 1990 and 2000. The most multi-family homes (5) were built before 1919 and the next most (4) were built between 1946 and 1960.

In 2000 there were 92 apartments in the municipality. The most common apartment size was 4 rooms of which there were 26. There were 5 single room apartments and 35 apartments with five or more rooms. Of these apartments, a total of 80 apartments (87.0% of the total) were permanently occupied, while 8 apartments (8.7%) were seasonally occupied and 4 apartments (4.3%) were empty. As of 2009, the construction rate of new housing units was 0 new units per 1000 residents. The vacancy rate for the municipality, in 2010, was 0%.

The historical population is given in the following chart:

== Heritage sites of national significance ==
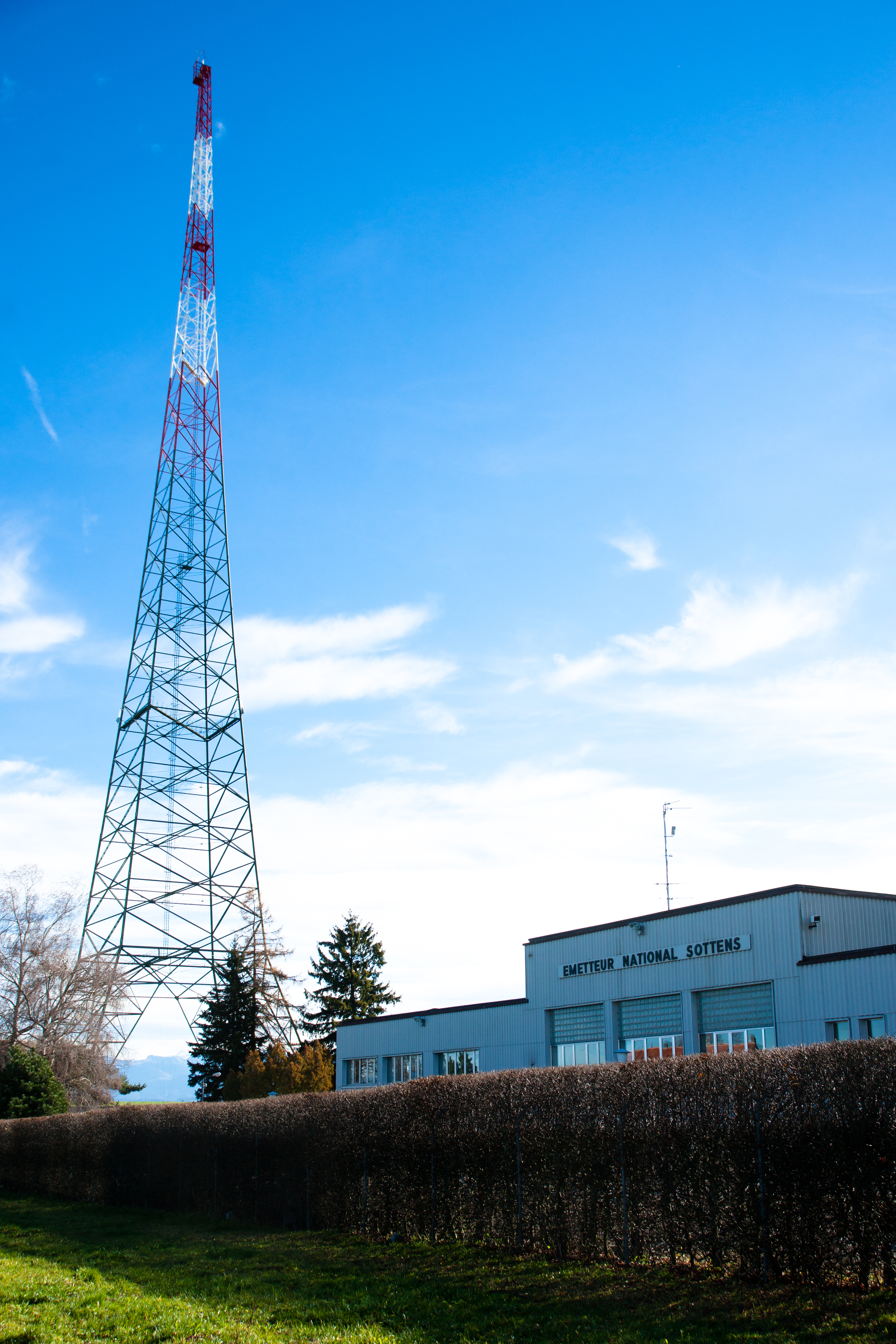
The Sottens transmitter

The Emetteur National De Sottens (Sottens transmitter) is listed as a Swiss heritage site of national significance.

The Sottens Transmitter is the nationwide transmitter for the French-speaking Radio Suisse Romande. It is easily receivable during the night throughout the whole of Europe.

== Politics ==
In the 2007 federal election the most popular party was the SVP which received 40.15% of the vote. The next three most popular parties were the SP (20.92%), the FDP (14.94%) and the PdA Party (7.35%). In the federal election, a total of 70 votes were cast, and the voter turnout was 43.8%.

== Economy ==
As of 2010, Sottens had an unemployment rate of 4.1%. As of 2008, there were 15 people employed in the primary economic sector and about 6 businesses involved in this sector. 50 people were employed in the secondary sector and there were 2 businesses in this sector. 23 people were employed in the tertiary sector, with 6 businesses in this sector. There were 119 residents of the municipality who were employed in some capacity, of which females made up 39.5% of the workforce.

In 2008 the total number of full-time equivalent jobs was 80. The number of jobs in the primary sector was 11, all of which were in agriculture. The number of jobs in the secondary sector was 49, all of which were in construction. The number of jobs in the tertiary sector was 20. In the tertiary sector; 1 was in the sale or repair of motor vehicles, 3 or 15.0% were in a hotel or restaurant, 9 or 45.0% were in the information industry, 4 or 20.0% were technical professionals or scientists, 2 or 10.0% were in education.

In 2000, there were 42 workers who commuted into the municipality and 81 workers who commuted away. The municipality is a net exporter of workers, with about 1.9 workers leaving the municipality for every one entering. Of the working population, 6.7% used public transportation to get to work, and 65.5% used a private car.

== Religion ==
According to the 2000 census, thirty-seven people, 17.6% of the total population, were Roman Catholic, while 120 or 57.1% belonged to the Swiss Reformed Church. Of the rest of the population, thirty-six individuals (17.14%) belonged to another Christian church, one individual was Jewish, and one Hindu. Thirty people (14.29%) were not affiliated to any church, agnostic or atheist, and two individuals (0.95% of the population) did not respond to the questions about belief.

== Education ==
In Sottens about 81 (38.6% of the population) have completed non-mandatory upper secondary education, and 29 or (13.8%) have completed additional higher education (either University or a Fachhochschule). Of the 29 who completed tertiary schooling, 51.7% were Swiss men, 31.0% were Swiss women.

In the 2009/2010 school year there were a total of 34 students in the Sottens school district. In the Vaud cantonal school system, two years of non-obligatory pre-school are provided by the political districts. During the school year, the political district provided pre-school care for a total of 296 children of which 96 children (32.4%) received subsidized pre-school care. The canton's primary school program requires students to attend for four years. There were 22 students in the municipal primary school program. The obligatory lower secondary school program lasts for six years and there were 12 students in those schools.

As of 2000, there were 5 students in Sottens who came from another municipality, while 28 residents attended schools outside the municipality.

== See also ==
Sottens transmitter
