= Montaubion-Chardonney =

- Former municipality
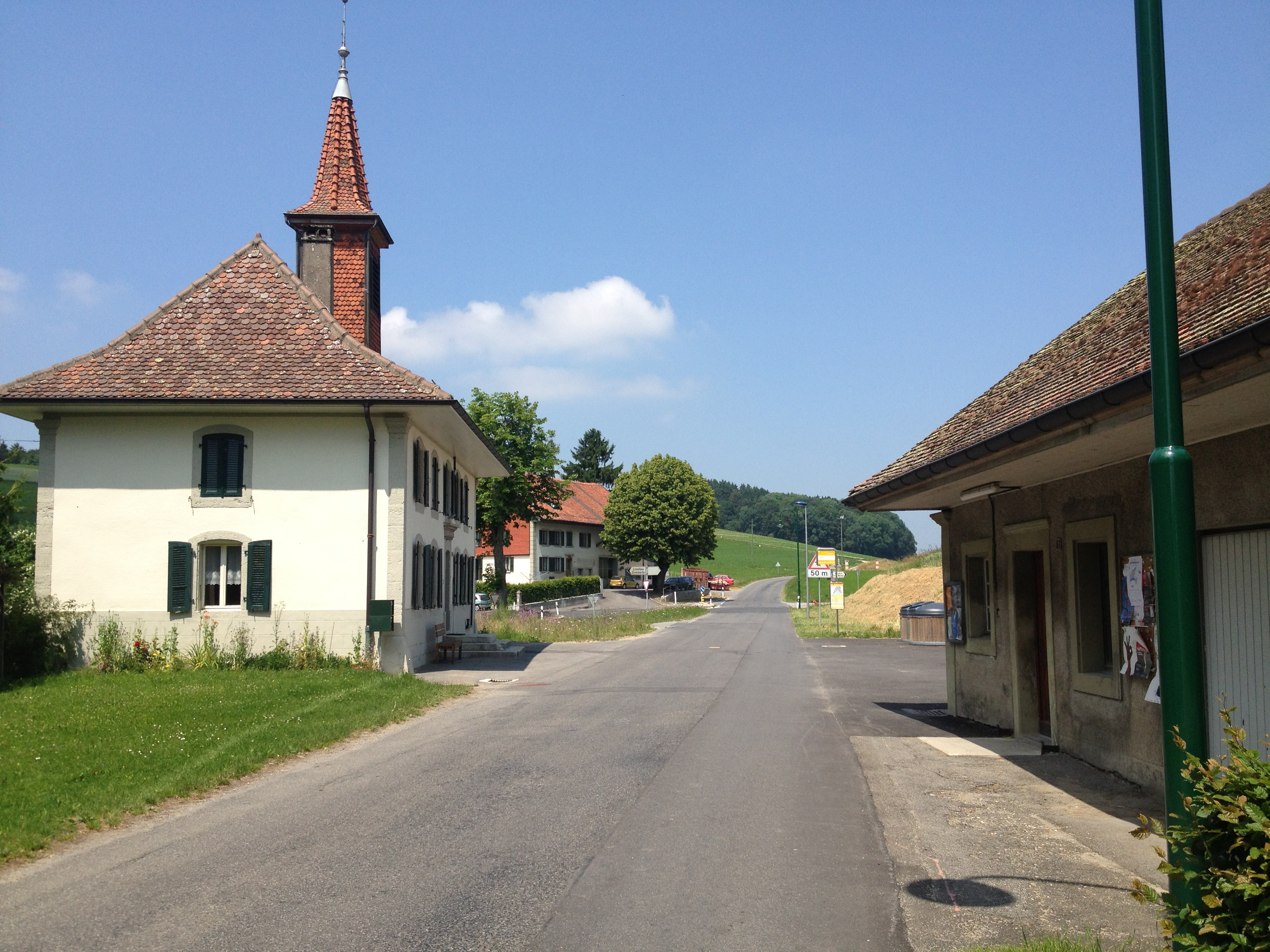

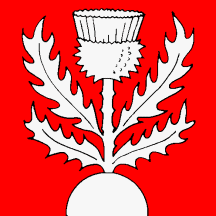
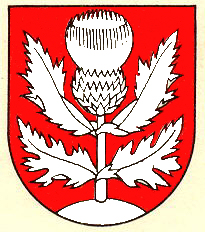
- Flag Coat of arms
- Location of Montaubion-Chardonney
- Location within Switzerland Location within Canton of Vaud
- Coordinates: 46°39′N 6°43′E
- Country: Switzerland
- Canton: Vaud
- District: Gros-de-Vaud

Area
  - Total: 2.05 km^{2} (0.79 sq mi)
- Elevation: 761 m (2,497 ft)

Population (2009)
  - Total: 69
  - Density: 34/km^{2} (87/sq mi)
- Time zone: UTC+01:00 (CET)
  - Summer (DST): UTC+02:00 (CEST)
- Postal code: 1041
- SFOS number: 5677
- ISO 3166 code: CH-VD
- Surrounded by: Dommartin, Peney-le-Jorat, Peyres-Possens, Sottens, Villars-Mendraz, Villars-Tiercelin
- Website: Profile (in French), SFSO statistics

Montaubion-Chardonney was a municipality in the district Gros-de-Vaud in the canton of Vaud in Switzerland.

The municipalities of Villars-Tiercelin, Montaubion-Chardonney, Sottens, Villars-Mendraz and Peney-le-Jorat merged on 1 July 2011 into the new municipality of Jorat-Menthue.

== History ==
Montaubion-Chardonney is first mentioned in 1200 as in Monte Albeonis. In 1223 Montaubion was mentioned as Montalbium and in 1223 Chardonney was mentioned as Chardenai.

== Geography ==
Montaubion-Chardonney has an area, as of 2009, of 2.1 square kilometers (0.81 mi^{2}). Of this area, 1.32 km^{2} (0.51 mi^{2}) or 62.6% is used for agricultural purposes, while 0.65 km^{2} (0.25 mi^{2}) or 30.8% is forested. Of the rest of the land, 0.12 km^{2} (30 acres) or 5.7% is settled (buildings or roads).

Of the built up area, housing and buildings made up 2.8% and transportation infrastructure made up 2.8%. Out of the forested land, 28.0% of the total land area is heavily forested and 2.8% is covered with orchards or small clusters of trees. Of the agricultural land, 48.3% is used for growing crops and 13.7% is pastures.

The municipality was part of the Moudon District until it was dissolved on 31 August 2006, and Montaubion-Chardonney became part of the new district of Gros-de-Vaud.

The village is located in the heart of the Jorat region. It consists of two hamlets on the right bank of the Mentue.

== Coat of arms ==
The blazon of the municipal coat of arms is Gules, from a Coupeaux rising a Thistle Argent.

== Demographics ==
Montaubion-Chardonney has a population (As of December 2009) of 69. As of 2008, 8.2% of the population are resident foreign nationals. Over the last 10 years (1999-2009 ) the population has changed at a rate of -10.4%. It has changed at a rate of -11.7% due to migration and at a rate of -1.3% due to births and deaths.

Most of the population (as of 2000) speaks French (69 or 93.2%), with German being second most common (2 or 2.7%) and Italian being third (1 or 1.4%).

Of the population in the municipality 19 or about 25.7% were born in Montaubion-Chardonney and lived there in 2000. There were 35 or 47.3% who were born in the same canton, while 11 or 14.9% were born somewhere else in Switzerland, and 9 or 12.2% were born outside of Switzerland.

In 2008 there were no live births to Swiss citizens and 1 death of a Swiss citizen. Ignoring immigration and emigration, the population of Swiss citizens decreased by 1 while the foreign population remained the same. At the same time, there were 1 non-Swiss woman who immigrated from another country to Switzerland. The total Swiss population change in 2008 (from all sources, including moves across municipal borders) was an increase of 2 and the non-Swiss population increased by 1 people. This represents a population growth rate of 4.3%.

The age distribution, as of 2009, in Montaubion-Chardonney is; 8 children or 11.6% of the population are between 0 and 9 years old and 3 teenagers or 4.3% are between 10 and 19. Of the adult population, 9 people or 13.0% of the population are between 20 and 29 years old. 9 people or 13.0% are between 30 and 39, 13 people or 18.8% are between 40 and 49, and 9 people or 13.0% are between 50 and 59. The senior population distribution is 12 people or 17.4% of the population are between 60 and 69 years old, 2 people or 2.9% are between 70 and 79, there are 4 people or 5.8% who are between 80 and 89.

As of 2000, there were 27 people who were single and never married in the municipality. There were 38 married individuals, 6 widows or widowers and 3 individuals who are divorced.

As of 2000 the average number of residents per living room was 0.55 which is fewer people per room than the cantonal average of 0.61 per room. In this case, a room is defined as space of a housing unit of at least 4 m² (43 sq ft) as normal bedrooms, dining rooms, living rooms, kitchens and habitable cellars and attics. About 56.7% of the total households were owner occupied, or in other words did not pay rent (though they may have a mortgage or a rent-to-own agreement).

As of 2000, there were 30 private households in the municipality, and an average of 2.5 persons per household. There were 11 households that consist of only one person and 2 households with five or more people. Out of a total of 30 households that answered this question, 36.7% were households made up of just one person. Of the rest of the households, there are 5 married couples without children, 14 married couples with children

In 2000 there were 9 single family homes (or 37.5% of the total) out of a total of 24 inhabited buildings. There were 5 multi-family buildings (20.8%) and along with 10 multi-purpose buildings that were mostly used for housing (41.7%). Of the single family homes 4 were built before 1919. The greatest number of multi-family homes (2) were built before 1919 and again between 1919 and 1945

In 2000 there were 33 apartments in the municipality. The most common apartment size was 4 rooms of which there were 8. There were 3 single room apartments and 14 apartments with five or more rooms. Of these apartments, a total of 30 apartments (90.9% of the total) were permanently occupied, while 3 apartments (9.1%) were seasonally occupied. As of 2009, the construction rate of new housing units was 0 new units per 1000 residents. The vacancy rate for the municipality, in 2010, was 0%.

The historical population is given in the following chart:

== Politics ==
In the 2007 federal election the most popular party was the SVP which received 23.83% of the vote. The next three most popular parties were the SP (23.63%), the FDP (21.38%) and the LPS Party (9.57%). In the federal election, a total of 30 votes were cast, and the voter turnout was 50.0%.

== Economy ==
As of 2010, Montaubion-Chardonney had an unemployment rate of 0.6%. As of 2008, there were 12 people employed in the primary economic sector and about 6 businesses involved in this sector. 13 people were employed in the secondary sector and there was 1 business in this sector. No one was employed in the tertiary sector. There were 43 residents of the municipality who were employed in some capacity, of which females made up 32.6% of the workforce.

In 2008 the total number of full-time equivalent jobs was 21. The number of jobs in the primary sector was 9, of which 7 were in agriculture and 2 were in forestry or lumber production. The number of jobs in the secondary sector was 12, all of which were in construction.

In 2000, there were 11 workers who commuted into the municipality and 27 workers who commuted away. The municipality is a net exporter of workers, with about 2.5 workers leaving the municipality for every one entering. Of the working population, 4.7% used public transportation to get to work, and 51.2% used a private car.

== Religion ==
From the 2000 census, 14 or 18.9% were Roman Catholic, while 42 or 56.8% belonged to the Swiss Reformed Church. Of the rest of the population, there were 12 individuals (or about 16.22% of the population) who belonged to another Christian church. 11 (or about 14.86% of the population) belonged to no church, are agnostic or atheist, and 1 individuals (or about 1.35% of the population) did not answer the question.

== Education ==
In Montaubion-Chardonney about 32 or (43.2%) of the population have completed non-mandatory upper secondary education, and 11 or (14.9%) have completed additional higher education (either University or a Fachhochschule). Of the 11 who completed tertiary schooling, 45.5% were Swiss men, 36.4% were Swiss women.

In the 2009/2010 school year there were a total of 3 students in the Montaubion-Chardonney school district. In the Vaud cantonal school system, two years of non-obligatory pre-school are provided by the political districts. During the school year, the political district provided pre-school care for a total of 296 children of which 96 children (32.4%) received subsidized pre-school care. The canton's primary school program requires students to attend for four years. There were 2 students in the municipal primary school program. The obligatory lower secondary school program lasts for six years and there was 1 student in the secondary school

As of 2000, there was one student in Montaubion-Chardonney who came from another municipality, while 10 residents attended schools outside the municipality.
