= Corcelles-le-Jorat =

Municipality in Vaud, Switzerland

- Municipality
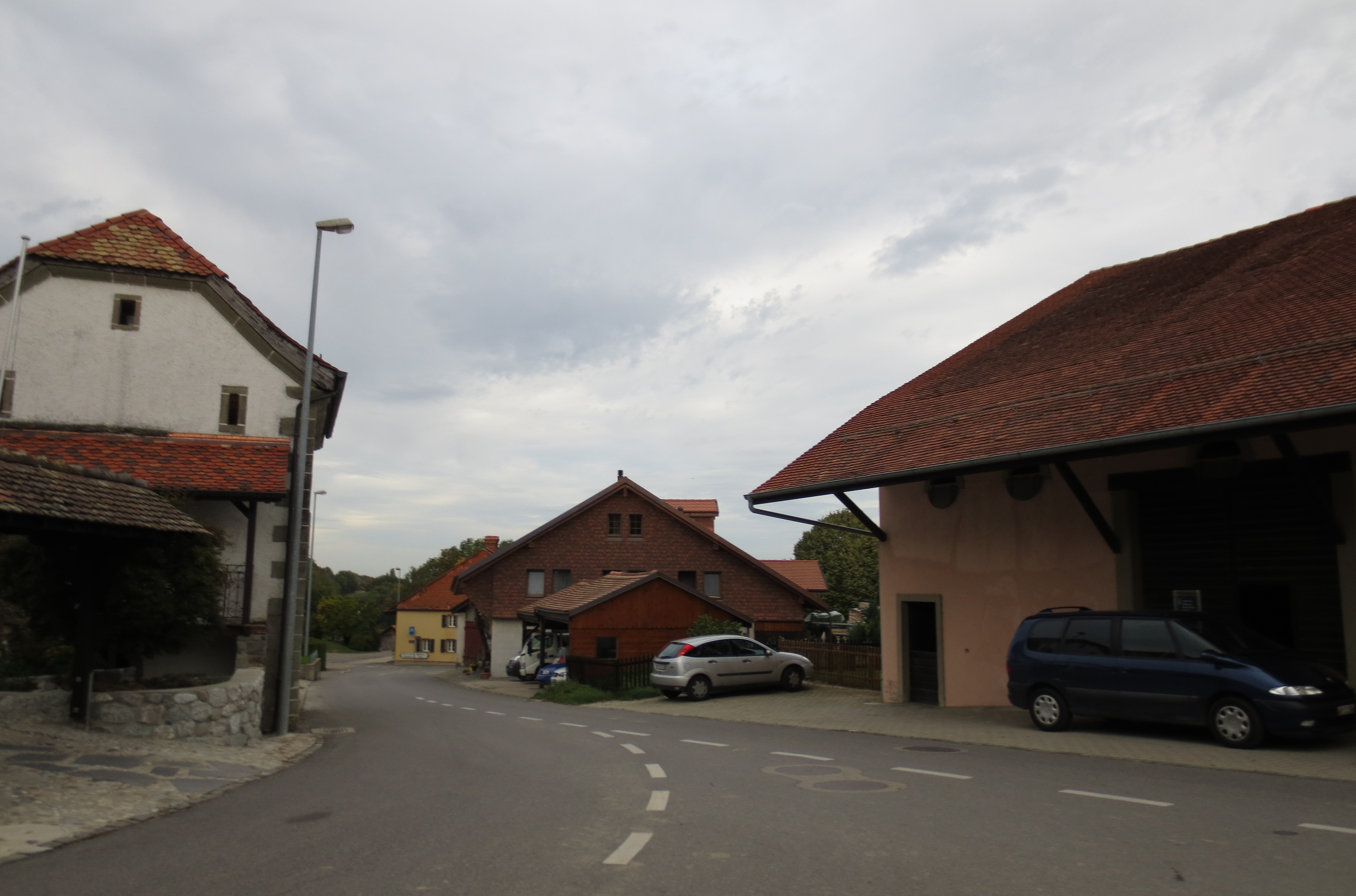

- Flag Coat of arms
- Location of Corcelles-le-Jorat
- Location within Switzerland Location within Canton of Vaud
- Coordinates: 46°36′N 06°45′E
- Country: Switzerland
- Canton: Vaud
- District: Broye-Vully

Government
  - Mayor: Syndic; Daniel Ruch

Area
  - Total: 7.94 km^{2} (3.07 sq mi)
- Elevation: 783 m (2,569 ft)

Population (2004)
  - Total: 429
  - Density: 54.0/km^{2} (140/sq mi)
- Demonym(s): Les Corçallins; Lè Grante-Coraille
- Time zone: UTC+01:00 (CET)
  - Summer (DST): UTC+02:00 (CEST)
- Postal code: 1082
- SFOS number: 5785
- ISO 3166 code: CH-VD
- Surrounded by: Peney-le-Jorat, Hermenches, Ropraz, Montpreveyres, Froideville, Villars-Tiercelin
- Website: https://www.corcelles-le-jorat.ch Profile (in French), SFSO statistics

Corcelles-le-Jorat is a municipality in the district of Broye-Vully in the canton of Vaud in Switzerland.

== History ==
Corcelles-le-Jorat is first mentioned about 1140 as Corceleys.

== Geography ==
Corcelles-le-Jorat has an area, as of 2009, of 7.93 square kilometers (3.06 sq mi). Of this area, 4.16 km^{2} (1.61 sq mi) or 52.5% is used for agricultural purposes, while 3.33 km^{2} (1.29 sq mi) or 42.0% is forested. Of the rest of the land, 0.46 km^{2} (0.18 sq mi) or 5.8% is settled (buildings or roads).

Of the built up area, housing and buildings made up 3.0% and transportation infrastructure made up 2.6%. Out of the forested land, 39.1% of the total land area is heavily forested and 2.9% is covered with orchards or small clusters of trees. Of the agricultural land, 28.1% is used for growing crops and 23.6% is pastures.

The municipality was part of the Oron District until it was dissolved on 31 August 2006, and Corcelles-le-Jorat became part of the new district of Broye-Vully.

The farming municipality is located at the intersection of the Lausanne-Moudon-Bern and Oron-Echallens roads. It consists of the village of Corcelles-le-Jorat and numerous hamlets.

== Coat of arms ==
The blazon of the municipal coat of arms is Or, a Rooster passant Sable lined Argent combed, beaked, langued, armed Gules.

== Demographics ==
Corcelles-le-Jorat has a population (as of December 2020) of 451. As of 2008, 7.8% of the population are resident foreign nationals. Over the last 10 years (1999–2009) the population has changed at a rate of 1.5%. It has changed at a rate of -2.5% due to migration and at a rate of 3% due to births and deaths.

Most of the population (as of 2000) speaks French (379 or 92.0%), with German being second most common (17 or 4.1%) and English being third (7 or 1.7%). There are 2 people who speak Italian.

Of the population in the municipality 138 or about 33.5% were born in Corcelles-le-Jorat and lived there in 2000. There were 153 or 37.1% who were born in the same canton, while 73 or 17.7% were born somewhere else in Switzerland, and 44 or 10.7% were born outside of Switzerland.

In 2008 there were 5 live births to Swiss citizens and were 2 deaths of Swiss citizens. Ignoring immigration and emigration, the population of Swiss citizens increased by 3 while the foreign population remained the same. There was 1 non-Swiss man who immigrated from another country to Switzerland. The total Swiss population change in 2008 (from all sources, including moves across municipal borders) was a decrease of 6 and the non-Swiss population increased by 2 people. This represents a population growth rate of -1.0%.

The age distribution, as of 2009, in Corcelles-le-Jorat is; 40 children or 9.7% of the population are between 0 and 9 years old and 43 teenagers or 10.4% are between 10 and 19. Of the adult population, 48 people or 11.7% of the population are between 20 and 29 years old. 38 people or 9.2% are between 30 and 39, 55 people or 13.3% are between 40 and 49, and 66 people or 16.0% are between 50 and 59. The senior population distribution is 63 people or 15.3% of the population are between 60 and 69 years old, 34 people or 8.3% are between 70 and 79, there are 21 people or 5.1% who are between 80 and 89, and there are 4 people or 1.0% who are 90 and older.

As of 2000, there were 165 people who were single and never married in the municipality. There were 206 married individuals, 15 widows or widowers and 26 individuals who are divorced.

As of 2000, there were 161 private households in the municipality, and an average of 2.5 persons per household. There were 38 households that consist of only one person and 15 households with five or more people. Out of a total of 168 households that answered this question, 22.6% were households made up of just one person and there were 2 adults who lived with their parents. Of the rest of the households, there are 59 married couples without children, 52 married couples with children There were 2 single parents with a child or children. There were 8 households that were made up of unrelated people and 7 households that were made up of some sort of institution or another collective housing.

In 2000 there were 56 single family homes (or 45.5% of the total) out of a total of 123 inhabited buildings. There were 18 multi-family buildings (14.6%), along with 44 multi-purpose buildings that were mostly used for housing (35.8%) and 5 other use buildings (commercial or industrial) that also had some housing (4.1%). Of the single family homes 28 were built before 1919, while 6 were built between 1990 and 2000. The most multi-family homes (7) were built before 1919 and the next most (5) were built between 1961 and 1970. There was 1 multi-family house built between 1996 and 2000.

In 2000 there were 173 apartments in the municipality. The most common apartment size was 4 rooms of which there were 43. There were 2 single room apartments and 76 apartments with five or more rooms. Of these apartments, a total of 155 apartments (89.6% of the total) were permanently occupied, while 13 apartments (7.5%) were seasonally occupied and 5 apartments (2.9%) were empty. As of 2009, the construction rate of new housing units was 0 new units per 1000 residents. The vacancy rate for the municipality, in 2010, was 1.1%.

The historical population is given in the following chart:

== Politics ==
In the 2007 federal election the most popular party was the SVP which received 35.74% of the vote. The next three most popular parties were the FDP (17.65%), the Green Party (13.53%) and the SP (12.31%). In the federal election, a total of 185 votes were cast, and the voter turnout was 59.9%.

== Economy ==
As of 2010, Corcelles-le-Jorat had an unemployment rate of 1.2%. As of 2008, there were 77 people employed in the primary economic sector and about 16 businesses involved in this sector. 9 people were employed in the secondary sector and there were 4 businesses in this sector. 18 people were employed in the tertiary sector, with 10 businesses in this sector. There were 217 residents of the municipality who were employed in some capacity, of which females made up 43.8% of the workforce.

In 2008 the total number of full-time equivalent jobs was 89. The number of jobs in the primary sector was 67, of which 35 were in agriculture and 32 were in forestry or lumber production. The number of jobs in the secondary sector was 9, all of which were in manufacturing. The number of jobs in the tertiary sector was 13. In the tertiary sector; 2 or 15.4% were in wholesale or retail sales or the repair of motor vehicles, 1 was in the movement and storage of goods, 4 or 30.8% were in a hotel or restaurant, 2 or 15.4% were technical professionals or scientists, 1 was in education.

In 2000, there were 25 workers who commuted into the municipality and 132 workers who commuted away. The municipality is a net exporter of workers, with about 5.3 workers leaving the municipality for every one entering. Of the working population, 5.1% used public transportation to get to work, and 62.2% used a private car.

== Religion ==
From the 2000 census, 65 or 15.8% were Roman Catholic, while 248 or 60.2% belonged to the Swiss Reformed Church. Of the rest of the population, there was 1 member of an Orthodox church and there were 18 individuals (or about 4.37% of the population) who belonged to another Christian church. There was 1 individual who was Islamic. There was 1 person who was Buddhist and 2 individuals who were Hindu. 71 (or about 17.23% of the population) belonged to no church, are agnostic or atheist, and 5 individuals (or about 1.21% of the population) did not answer the question.

== Education ==
In Corcelles-le-Jorat about 158 or (38.3%) of the population have completed non-mandatory upper secondary education, and 75 or (18.2%) have completed additional higher education (either university or a Fachhochschule). Of the 75 who completed tertiary schooling, 52.0% were Swiss men, 36.0% were Swiss women, 6.7% were non-Swiss men.

In the 2009/2010 school year there were a total of 46 students in the Corcelles-le-Jorat school district. In the Vaud cantonal school system, two years of non-obligatory pre-school are provided by the political districts. During the school year, the political district provided pre-school care for a total of 155 children of which 83 children (53.5%) received subsidized pre-school care. The canton's primary school program requires students to attend for four years. There were 23 students in the municipal primary school program. The obligatory lower secondary school program lasts for six years and there were 23 students in those schools.

As of 2000, there were 11 students in Corcelles-le-Jorat who came from another municipality, while 65 residents attended schools outside the municipality.
