= Villars-Mendraz =

- Former municipality
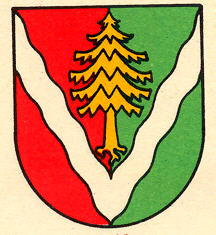
- Coat of arms
- Location of Villars-Mendraz
- Location within Switzerland Location within Canton of Vaud
- Coordinates: 46°39′N 6°44′E
- Country: Switzerland
- Canton: Vaud
- District: Gros-de-Vaud

Area
  - Total: 1.55 km^{2} (0.60 sq mi)
- Elevation: 774 m (2,539 ft)

Population (2003)
  - Total: 183
  - Density: 118/km^{2} (306/sq mi)
- Time zone: UTC+01:00 (CET)
  - Summer (DST): UTC+02:00 (CEST)
- Postal code: 1061
- SFOS number: 5691
- ISO 3166 code: CH-VD
- Surrounded by: Montaubion-Chardonney, Peney-le-Jorat, Sottens
- Website: Profile (in French), SFSO statistics

Villars-Mendraz is a municipality in the district Gros-de-Vaud in the canton of Vaud in Switzerland.

The municipalities of Villars-Tiercelin, Montaubion-Chardonney, Sottens, Villars-Mendraz and Peney-le-Jorat merged on 1 July 2011 into the new municipality of Jorat-Menthue.

== Geography ==
Villars-Mendraz has an area, as of 2009, of 1.6 square kilometers (0.62 mi^{2}). Of this area, 1.13 km^{2} (0.44 mi^{2}) or 72.4% is used for agricultural purposes, while 0.31 km^{2} (0.12 mi^{2}) or 19.9% is forested. Of the rest of the land, 0.1 km^{2} (25 acres) or 6.4% is settled (buildings or roads).

Of the built up area, housing and buildings made up 3.8% and transportation infrastructure made up 1.9%. Out of the forested land, 17.3% of the total land area is heavily forested and 2.6% is covered with orchards or small clusters of trees. Of the agricultural land, 44.2% is used for growing crops and 27.6% is pastures.

The municipality was part of the Moudon District until it was dissolved on 31 August 2006, and Villars-Mendraz became part of the new district of Gros-de-Vaud.

== Coat of arms ==
The blazon of the municipal coat of arms is Per pale Gules, a Band wavy Argent and Vert, a Bend sinister wavy of the second, overall in chief a Pine tree eradicated Or.

== Demographics ==
Villars-Mendraz has a population (as of December 2009) of 188. As of 2008, 7.4% of the population are resident foreign nationals. Over the last 10 years (1999–2009 ) the population has changed at a rate of 2.2%. It has changed at a rate of -1.6% due to migration and at a rate of 4.3% due to births and deaths.

Most of the population (as of 2000) speaks French (180 or 94.7%), with German being second most common (6 or 3.2%) and Portuguese being third (2 or 1.1%).

Of the population in the village 65 or about 34.2% were born in Villars-Mendraz and lived there in 2000. There were 88 or 46.3% who were born in the same canton, while 21 or 11.1% were born somewhere else in Switzerland, and 14 or 7.4% were born outside of Switzerland.

In 2008 there were 3 live births to Swiss citizens and were 2 deaths of Swiss citizens. Ignoring immigration and emigration, the population of Swiss citizens increased by 1 while the foreign population remained the same. There were 2 Swiss men who emigrated from Switzerland and 1 Swiss woman who immigrated back to Switzerland. At the same time, there were 1 non-Swiss woman who immigrated from another country to Switzerland. The total Swiss population remained the same in 2008 and the non-Swiss population increased by 1 people. This represents a population growth rate of 0.5%.

The age distribution, as of 2009, in Villars-Mendraz is; 15 children or 8.0% of the population are between 0 and 9 years old and 25 teenagers or 13.3% are between 10 and 19. Of the adult population, 24 people or 12.8% of the population are between 20 and 29 years old. 23 people or 12.2% are between 30 and 39, 35 people or 18.6% are between 40 and 49, and 29 people or 15.4% are between 50 and 59. The senior population distribution is 21 people or 11.2% of the population are between 60 and 69 years old, 8 people or 4.3% are between 70 and 79, there are 8 people or 4.3% who are between 80 and 89.

As of 2000, there were 84 people who were single and never married in the village. There were 90 married individuals, 8 widows or widowers and 8 individuals who are divorced.

As of 2000 the average number of residents per living room was 0.58 which is about equal to the cantonal average of 0.61 per room. In this case, a room is defined as space of a housing unit of at least 4 m^{2} (43 sq ft) as normal bedrooms, dining rooms, living rooms, kitchens and habitable cellars and attics. About 50% of the total households were owner occupied, or in other words did not pay rent (though they may have a mortgage or a rent-to-own agreement).

As of 2000, there were 76 private households in the village, and an average of 2.4 persons per household. There were 22 households that consist of only one person and 3 households with five or more people. Out of a total of 78 households that answered this question, 28.2% were households made up of just one person. Of the rest of the households, there are 19 married couples without children, 30 married couples with children. There were 2 single parents with a child or children. There were 3 households that were made up of unrelated people and 2 households that were made up of some sort of institution or another collective housing.

In 2000 there were 19 single family homes (or 41.3% of the total) out of a total of 46 inhabited buildings. There were 15 multi-family buildings (32.6%), along with 11 multi-purpose buildings that were mostly used for housing (23.9%) and 1 other use buildings (commercial or industrial) that also had some housing (2.2%). Of the single family homes 9 were built before 1919, while 1 was built between 1990 and 2000. The most multi-family homes (6) were built before 1919 and the next most (5) were built between 1971 and 1980.

In 2000 there were 75 apartments in the village. The most common apartment size was 3 rooms of which there were 19. There were 7 single room apartments and 29 apartments with five or more rooms. Of these apartments, a total of 66 apartments (88.0% of the total) were permanently occupied, while 6 apartments (8.0%) were seasonally occupied and 3 apartments (4.0%) were empty. As of 2009, the construction rate of new housing units was 10.6 new units per 1000 residents. The vacancy rate for the village, in 2010, was 0%.

The historical population is given in the following chart:

== Politics ==
In the 2007 federal election the most popular party was the SVP which received 41.43% of the vote. The next three most popular parties were the SP (15.63%), the Green Party (15.54%) and the FDP (15.25%). In the federal election, a total of 61 votes were cast, and the voter turnout was 44.9%.

== Economy ==
As of 2010, Villars-Mendraz had an unemployment rate of 2.2%. As of 2008, there were 16 people employed in the primary economic sector and about 7 businesses involved in this sector. 6 people were employed in the secondary sector and there were 3 businesses in this sector. 13 people were employed in the tertiary sector, with 5 businesses in this sector. There were 119 residents of the village who were employed in some capacity, of which females made up 47.9% of the workforce.

In 2008 the total number of full-time equivalent jobs was 30. The number of jobs in the primary sector was 12, all of which were in agriculture. The number of jobs in the secondary sector was 6 of which 1 was in manufacturing and 5 (83.3%) were in construction. The number of jobs in the tertiary sector was 12. In the tertiary sector; 8 or 66.7% were in the sale or repair of motor vehicles, 2 or 16.7% were in a hotel or restaurant, 2 or 16.7% were in education.

In 2000, there were 5 workers who commuted into the village and 88 workers who commuted away. The village is a net exporter of workers, with about 17.6 workers leaving the village for every one entering. Of the working population, 4.2% used public transportation to get to work, and 74.8% used a private car.

== Religion ==
From the 2000 census, 29 or 15.3% were Roman Catholic, while 134 or 70.5% belonged to the Swiss Reformed Church. There was 1 person who was Buddhist. 23 (or about 12.11% of the population) belonged to no church, are agnostic or atheist, and 3 individuals (or about 1.58% of the population) did not answer the question.

== Education ==
In Villars-Mendraz about 88 or (46.3%) of the population have completed non-mandatory upper secondary education, and 20 or (10.5%) have completed additional higher education (either university or a Fachhochschule). Of the 20 who completed tertiary schooling, 50.0% were Swiss men, 40.0% were Swiss women.

In the 2009/2010 school year there were a total of 21 students in the Villars-Mendraz school district. In the Vaud cantonal school system, two years of non-obligatory pre-school are provided by the political districts. During the school year, the political district provided pre-school care for a total of 296 children of which 96 children (32.4%) received subsidized pre-school care. The canton's primary school program requires students to attend for four years. There were 12 students in the municipal primary school program. The obligatory lower secondary school program lasts for six years and there were 9 students in those schools.

As of 2000, there were 12 students in Villars-Mendraz who came from another village, while 25 residents attended schools outside the village.
