= Villars-Tiercelin =

- Former municipality
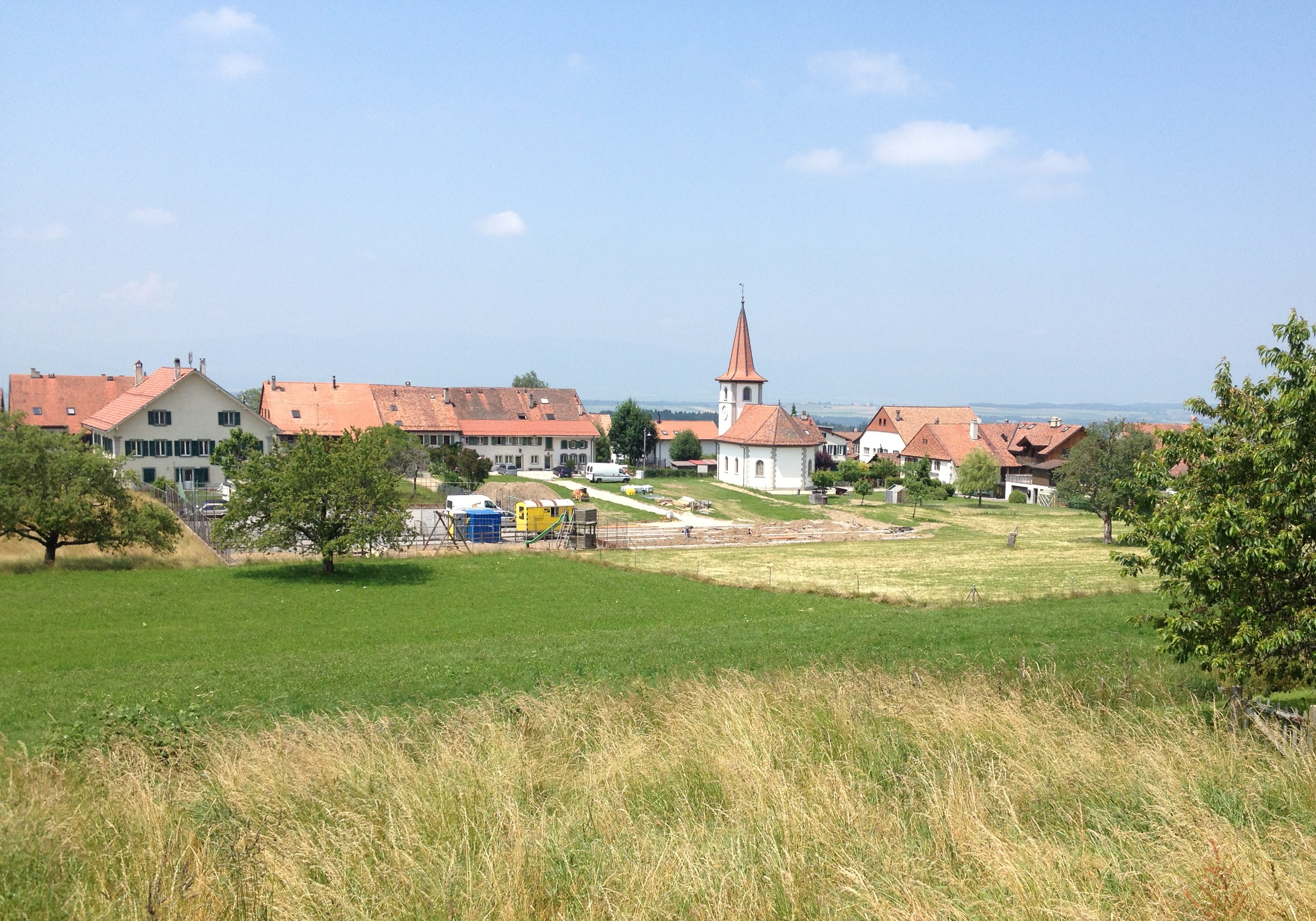

- Coat of arms
- Location of Villars-Tiercelin
- Location within Switzerland Location within Canton of Vaud
- Coordinates: 46°38′N 6°42′E
- Country: Switzerland
- Canton: Vaud
- District: Gros-de-Vaud

Area
  - Total: 4.99 km^{2} (1.93 sq mi)
- Elevation: 813 m (2,667 ft)

Population (December 2009)
  - Total: 403
  - Density: 80.8/km^{2} (209/sq mi)
- Time zone: UTC+01:00 (CET)
  - Summer (DST): UTC+02:00 (CEST)
- Postal code: 1058
- SFOS number: 5538
- ISO 3166 code: CH-VD
- Surrounded by: Corcelles-le-Jorat, Dommartin, Froideville, Montaubion-Chardonney, Peney-le-Jorat, Poliez-Pittet
- Website: Profile (in French), SFSO statistics

Villars-Tiercelin was a municipality in the district of Gros-de-Vaud in the canton of Vaud in Switzerland.

The municipalities of Villars-Tiercelin, Montaubion-Chardonney, Sottens, Villars-Mendraz and Peney-le-Jorat merged on 1 July 2011 into the new municipality of Jorat-Menthue.

== Geography ==
Villars-Tiercelin has an area, as of 2009, of 4.99 square kilometers (1.93 sq mi). Of this area, 2.29 km^{2} (0.88 sq mi) or 45.9% is used for agricultural purposes, while 2.32 km^{2} (0.90 sq mi) or 46.5% is forested. Of the rest of the land, 0.36 km^{2} (0.14 sq mi) or 7.2% is settled (buildings or roads), 0.01 km^{2} (2.5 acres) or 0.2% is either rivers or lakes and 0.01 km^{2} (2.5 acres) or 0.2% is unproductive land.

Of the built up area, housing and buildings made up 2.6% and transportation infrastructure made up 3.6%. Out of the forested land, all of the forested land area is covered with heavy forests. Of the agricultural land, 30.3% is used for growing crops and 15.2% is pastures. All the water in the municipality is flowing water.

The municipality was part of the Echallens District until it was dissolved on 31 August 2006, and Villars-Tiercelin became part of the new district of Gros-de-Vaud.

== Coat of arms ==
The blazon of the municipal coat of arms is Per pale Argent and Gules, a Bar wavy counterchanged.

== Demographics ==
Villars-Tiercelin has a population (as of 2009) of 403. Over the last 10 years (1999–2009 ) the population has changed at a rate of 16.8%. It has changed at a rate of 9.3% due to migration and at a rate of 8.1% due to births and deaths.

Most of the population (as of 2000) speaks French (321 or 93.6%), with German being second most common (12 or 3.5%) and English being third (3 or 0.9%). There are 2 people who speak Italian.

Of the population in the municipality 72 or about 21.0% were born in Villars-Tiercelin and lived there in 2000. There were 153 or 44.6% who were born in the same canton, while 65 or 19.0% were born somewhere else in Switzerland, and 51 or 14.9% were born outside of Switzerland.

In 2008 there were 5 live births to Swiss citizens and were 3 deaths of Swiss citizens. Ignoring immigration and emigration, the population of Swiss citizens increased by 2 while the foreign population remained the same. At the same time, there were 3 non-Swiss men and 1 non-Swiss woman who immigrated from another country to Switzerland. The total Swiss population change in 2008 (from all sources, including moves across municipal borders) was an increase of 14 and the non-Swiss population increased by 3 people. This represents a population growth rate of 4.6%.

The age distribution, as of 2009, in Villars-Tiercelin is; 60 children or 14.9% of the population are between 0 and 9 years old and 56 teenagers or 13.9% are between 10 and 19. Of the adult population, 28 people or 6.9% of the population are between 20 and 29 years old. 57 people or 14.1% are between 30 and 39, 68 people or 16.9% are between 40 and 49, and 47 people or 11.7% are between 50 and 59. The senior population distribution is 58 people or 14.4% of the population are between 60 and 69 years old, 18 people or 4.5% are between 70 and 79, there are 9 people or 2.2% who are between 80 and 89, and there are 2 people or 0.5% who are 90 and older.

As of 2000, there were 124 people who were single and never married in the municipality. There were 182 married individuals, 15 widows or widowers and 22 individuals who are divorced.

As of 2000 the average number of residents per living room was 0.52 which is fewer people per room than the cantonal average of 0.61 per room. In this case, a room is defined as space of a housing unit of at least 4 m^{2} (43 sq ft) as normal bedrooms, dining rooms, living rooms, kitchens and habitable cellars and attics. About 57.6% of the total households were owner occupied, or in other words did not pay rent (though they may have a mortgage or a rent-to-own agreement).

As of 2000, there were 149 private households in the municipality, and an average of 2.3 persons per household. There were 43 households that consist of only one person and 6 households with five or more people. Out of a total of 151 households that answered this question, 28.5% were households made up of just one person. Of the rest of the households, there are 49 married couples without children, 44 married couples with children There were 10 single parents with a child or children. There were 3 households that were made up of unrelated people and 2 households that were made up of some sort of institution or another collective housing.

In 2000 there were 64 single family homes (or 62.1% of the total) out of a total of 103 inhabited buildings. There were 22 multi-family buildings (21.4%), along with 12 multi-purpose buildings that were mostly used for housing (11.7%) and 5 other use buildings (commercial or industrial) that also had some housing (4.9%). Of the single family homes 15 were built before 1919, while 8 were built between 1990 and 2000. The greatest number of single family homes (21) were built between 1971 and 1980. The most multi-family homes (13) were built before 1919 and the next most (5) were built between 1991 and 1995.

In 2000 there were 158 apartments in the municipality. The most common apartment size was 4 rooms of which there were 45. There were 8 single room apartments and 67 apartments with five or more rooms. Of these apartments, a total of 144 apartments (91.1% of the total) were permanently occupied, while 10 apartments (6.3%) were seasonally occupied and 4 apartments (2.5%) were empty. As of 2009, the construction rate of new housing units was 2.5 new units per 1000 residents. The vacancy rate for the municipality, in 2010, was 0%.

The historical population is given in the following chart:

== Politics ==
In the 2007 federal election the most popular party was the SVP which received 33.27% of the vote. The next three most popular parties were the SP (14.63%), the FDP (13.69%) and the CVP (9.53%). In the federal election, a total of 125 votes were cast, and the voter turnout was 49.6%.

== Economy ==
As of 2010, Villars-Tiercelin had an unemployment rate of 2.7%. As of 2008, there were 15 people employed in the primary economic sector and about 6 businesses involved in this sector. 5 people were employed in the secondary sector and there were 3 businesses in this sector. 14 people were employed in the tertiary sector, with 8 businesses in this sector. There were 186 residents of the municipality who were employed in some capacity, of which females made up 40.3% of the workforce.

In 2008 the total number of full-time equivalent jobs was 27. The number of jobs in the primary sector was 12, of which 7 were in agriculture and 5 were in forestry or lumber production. The number of jobs in the secondary sector was 5 of which 4 or (80.0%) were in manufacturing and 1 was in construction. The number of jobs in the tertiary sector was 10. In the tertiary sector; 2 were in the sale or repair of motor vehicles, 2 were in the movement and storage of goods, 1 was in a hotel or restaurant, 2 were technical professionals or scientists and 2 were in education.

In 2000, there were 16 workers who commuted into the municipality and 152 workers who commuted away. The municipality is a net exporter of workers, with about 9.5 workers leaving the municipality for every one entering. Of the working population, 5.9% used public transportation to get to work, and 77.4% used a private car.

== Religion ==
From the 2000 census, 101 or 29.4% were Roman Catholic, while 168 or 49.0% belonged to the Swiss Reformed Church. Of the rest of the population, there was 1 member of an Orthodox church, and there were 25 individuals (or about 7.29% of the population) who belonged to another Christian church. There was 1 individual who was Jewish and there was 1 individual who belonged to another church. 57 (or about 16.62% of the population) belonged to no church, are agnostic or atheist, and 1 individuals (or about 0.29% of the population) did not answer the question.

== Weather ==
Villars-Tiercelin has an average of 130.4 days of rain or snow per year and on average receives 1,372 mm (54.0 in) of precipitation. The wettest month is November during which time Villars-Tiercelin receives an average of 129 mm (5.1 in) of rain or snow. During this month there is precipitation for an average of 10.9 days. The month with the most days of precipitation is May, with an average of 13.4, but with only 119 mm (4.7 in) of rain or snow. The driest month of the year is April with an average of 100 mm (3.9 in) of precipitation over 11.4 days.

== Education ==
In Villars-Tiercelin about 145 or (42.3%) of the population have completed non-mandatory upper secondary education, and 66 or (19.2%) have completed additional higher education (either University or a Fachhochschule). Of the 66 who completed tertiary schooling, 66.7% were Swiss men, 18.2% were Swiss women, 7.6% were non-Swiss men and 7.6% were non-Swiss women.

In the 2009/2010 school year there were a total of 71 students in the Villars-Tiercelin school district. In the Vaud cantonal school system, two years of non-obligatory pre-school are provided by the political districts. During the school year, the political district provided pre-school care for a total of 296 children of which 96 children (32.4%) received subsidized pre-school care. The canton's primary school program requires students to attend for four years. There were 34 students in the municipal primary school program. The obligatory lower secondary school program lasts for six years and there were 36 students in those schools. There were also 1 students who were home schooled or attended another non-traditional school.

As of 2000, there were 10 students in Villars-Tiercelin who came from another municipality, while 36 residents attended schools outside the municipality.
