= Reform schools in Switzerland =

Reform schools (Note: German: Erziehungsheime; French: Ecoles de redressement; Italian: Istituti di rieducazione) in Switzerland were institutions that formed an integral part of the confinement system from the mid-19th century onwards. These establishments primarily housed adolescents and were distinguished from children's homes, which cared for preschool and school-age minors, and forced labor establishments designed for young adults and adults.

== Historical development ==
Reform schools had both punitive and corrective functions and represented an escalation level above children's homes. Unlike most forced labor establishments, they typically offered vocational training opportunities. The boundaries between different types of institutions were frequently blurred.

Early designations included "rescue institutions" (Rettungsanstalt), "correction institutions" (Korrektionsanstalt), and "compulsory education institutions" (Zwangserziehungsanstalt), which later became simply "education institutions" (Erziehungsanstalt) in German-speaking Switzerland and similar terms (istituto) in Ticino.

During the second half of the 20th century, following conceptual adjustments, institutions often received more specific designations such as "youth homes," "girls' homes," "educational establishments," "observation homes," or "temporary reception homes." The 1974 revision of juvenile criminal law introduced the terms "therapy homes" and "re-education homes."

Efforts during the 19th century to establish intercantonal cooperation through organizations like the Swiss Charitable Society or through concordats remained unsuccessful.

== Organization and structure ==
Throughout the 20th century, Switzerland had between 30 and 80 reform schools, depending on the counting method. These institutions were always gender-segregated and operated by various entities including cantons, municipalities, and private and ecclesiastical organizations. The vast majority were located in German-speaking Switzerland. The number of establishments for adolescent girls and young women was roughly equivalent to those for adolescent boys and young men nationwide.

=== Facilities and locations ===
These institutions varied in size—some housed only a few residents while others accommodated over a hundred. They were often located in repurposed old buildings on the periphery. Notable institutions included:

- Aarburg
- Dielsdorf (Pestalozzi-Jugendstätte Burghof)
- Hausen am Albis (Landerziehungsheim Albisbrunn)
- Knutwil (Erziehungsheim St. Georg)
- Lausanne (Maison d'éducation de Vennes)
- Münsingen (Jugendheim Lory)
- Oberbüren (Erziehungsanstalt Thurhof)
- Riva San Vitale (Istituto Canisio)
- Richterswil
- Villars-les-Joncs (Institut Bon Pasteur)
- Montagne de Diesse (Foyer d'éducation de Prêles)

=== Population ===
Young people placed in these institutions had typically completed compulsory schooling and ranged in age from approximately 13 to 20 years, depending on the establishment. Stay durations varied from several months to several years. Placements were ordered under criminal law, civil law (guardianship law), or cantonal administrative internment laws, though in daily life no distinction was generally made between different categories of internees.

=== Management ===
The institutions were often denominational, which influenced both their educational concept and management structure (by religious orders, directors, or director couples). After World War II, with the diversification of care structures and therapies, progressive standardization occurred in staff training, supervision ratios, and infrastructure, with lay management becoming more common. Conceptual adaptations often led to new building construction or transformation of old structures and a reduction in capacity.

== Educational approach and vocational training ==
Education aimed to prepare children and adolescents—generally from socio-economically disadvantaged families—for working life. Gender norms guided activities and were reflected particularly in training opportunities, offered mainly within the institution and rarely outside.

Young men were primarily trained and employed in agriculture, crafts (shoemaking, basket weaving, sewing), metalworking shops and automobile garages (from the 1950s onwards). Young women were trained and employed in domestic economy, needlework, laundry or ironing, office work (in later periods).

Until the early 1970s, young women subject to administrative detention were forced to perform labor for Swiss companies in factories installed within the homes.

== Daily life and discipline ==
Collective daily life and residents' work were clearly and hierarchically structured, with rules and sanctions. Punishments for those who escaped and were subsequently captured by police included head shaving, food deprivation, and solitary confinement. Relationships between "students" were additionally governed by unofficial rules and hierarchies.

The isolation of reform schools and closed placement facilitated violations of integrity as well as psychological, physical, and sexual violence perpetrated by management, staff, and other residents. The lack of trust and listening from educators and external reference persons (guardians, social workers, psychiatrists) generally deterred victims from filing complaints.

Contacts with parents and family (visits, correspondence) were also regulated; a common sanction was to suppress these privileges. Throughout the 20th century, external connections were expanded (leave days, outings) within the framework of gradual release procedures.

== Criticism and reform ==
The May 1968 movement with its critique of authority questioned the role and effectiveness of such institutions. The Heimkampagne (home campaign), launched in 1971-1972 by Zurich youth gathered around the autonomous center, contributed to bringing about transformations and reforms in institutional child and youth welfare. A multitude of outpatient care and counseling services emerged as alternatives to placement. Simultaneously, intercantonal coordination intensified.

The first critical research on homes and confinement institutions was conducted in the 1970s at the University of Zurich's social pedagogy chair by Heinrich Tuggener. From the late 1980s onwards, autobiographical publications by affected individuals stimulated growing interest from historical and social sciences.

Scientific research emphasizes that traumatic experiences in reform schools marked former residents for life and sometimes caused consequences across multiple generations.
