= Peney-le-Jorat =

- Former municipality
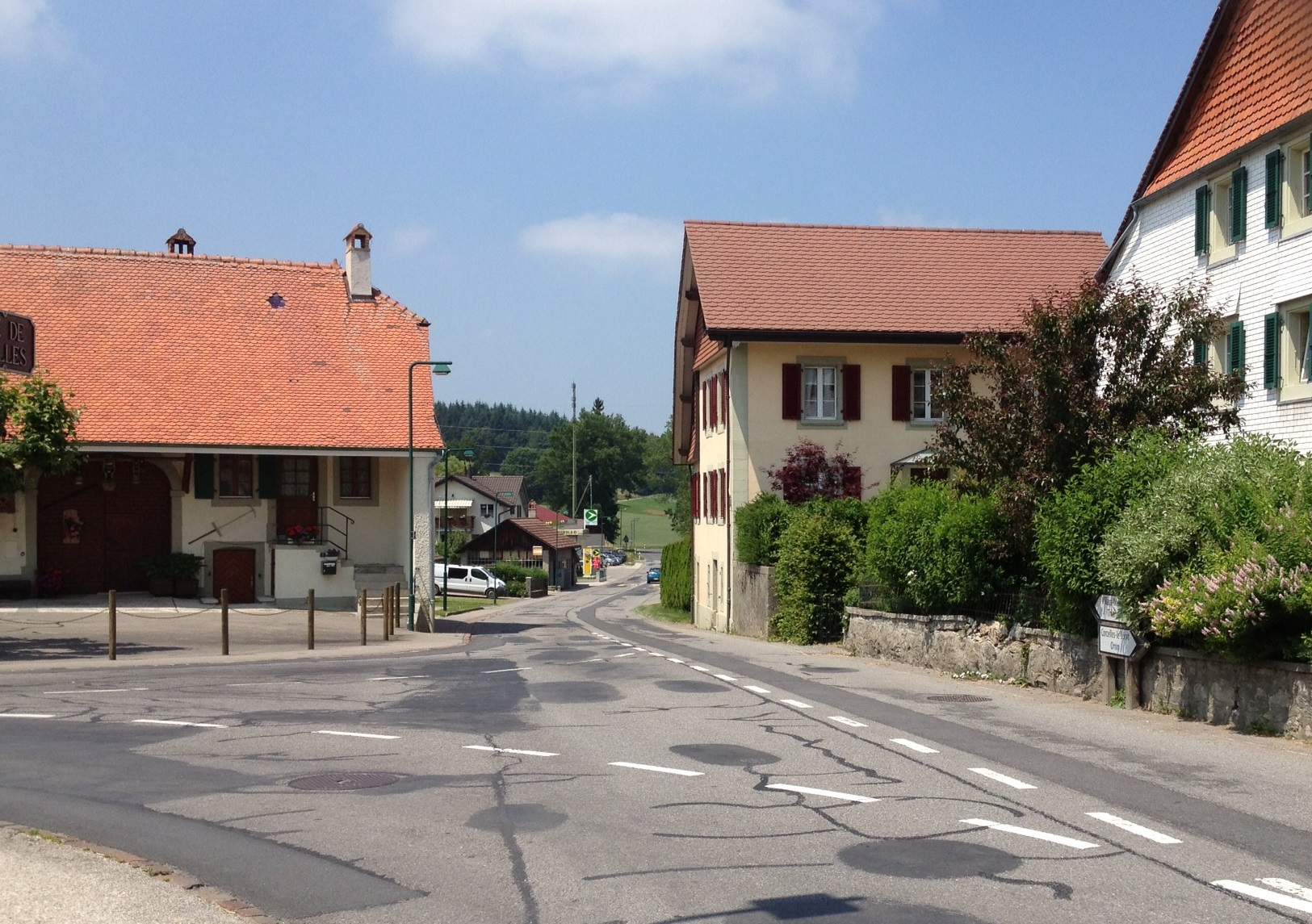

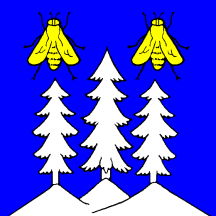
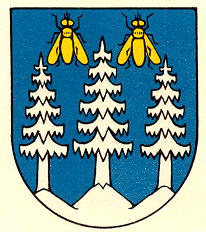
- Flag Coat of arms
- Location of Peney-le-Jorat
- Location within Switzerland Location within Canton of Vaud
- Coordinates: 46°37′N 06°43′E
- Country: Switzerland
- Canton: Vaud
- District: Gros-de-Vaud

Government
  - Mayor: Marc Ducret

Area
  - Total: 4.46 km^{2} (1.72 sq mi)
- Elevation: 844 m (2,769 ft)

Population (2009)
  - Total: 377
  - Density: 84.5/km^{2} (219/sq mi)
- Demonym(s): Les Penatzets; Les Tavans
- Time zone: UTC+01:00 (CET)
  - Summer (DST): UTC+02:00 (CEST)
- Postal code: 1059
- SFOS number: 5796
- ISO 3166 code: CH-VD
- Surrounded by: Montaubion-Chardonney, Villars-Mendraz, Sottens, Hermenches, Corcelles-le-Jorat, Villars-Tiercelin
- Website: Profile (in French), SFSO statistics

Peney-le-Jorat is a former municipality in the district of Gros-de-Vaud in the canton of Vaud in Switzerland. It is in the south-west of Switzerland, in close proximity to both France and Italy.

The villages of Villars-Tiercelin, Montaubion-Chardonney, Sottens, Villars-Mendraz and Peney-le-Jorat merged on 1 July 2011 into the new municipality of Jorat-Menthue.

== History ==
Peney-le-Jorat is first mentioned around 1141–43 as Pinoy.

== Geography ==
Aerial view from 1200 m by Walter Mittelholzer, Peney-le-Jorat in the foreground (1924)

Peney-le-Jorat has an area, as of 2009, of 4.5 square kilometers (1.7 mi^{2}). Of this area, 2.45 km^{2} (0.95 mi^{2}) or 54.9% is used for agricultural purposes, while 1.77 km^{2} (0.68 mi^{2}) or 39.7% is forested. Of the rest of the land, 0.26 km^{2} (0.10 mi^{2}) or 5.8% is settled (buildings or roads).

Of the built up area, housing and buildings made up 2.5% and transportation infrastructure made up 2.9%. Out of the forested land, 38.3% of the total land area is heavily forested and 1.3% is covered with orchards or small clusters of trees. Of the agricultural land, 38.3% is used for growing crops and 16.4% is pastures.

The municipality was part of the Oron District until it was dissolved on 31 August 2006, and Peney-le-Jorat became part of the new district of Gros-de-Vaud.

The village is located on a plateau in the middle Jorat. It consists of the village of Peney-le-Jorat and a number of surrounding hamlets.

== Coat of arms ==
The blazon of the municipal coat of arms is Azure, on three Hills as many Pine-trees Argent, in chief two Gad-flies Or.

== Demographics ==
Peney-le-Jorat has a population (As of December 2009) of 377. As of 2008, 12.6% of the population are resident foreign nationals. Over the last 10 years (1999-2009 ) the population has changed at a rate of 25.7%. It has changed at a rate of 14.7% due to migration and at a rate of 11.3% due to births and deaths.

Most of the population (as of 2000) speaks French (285 or 91.3%), with Portuguese being second most common (11 or 3.5%) and German being third (10 or 3.2%). There are 2 people who speak Italian.

Of the population in the village 96 or about 30.8% were born in Peney-le-Jorat and lived there in 2000. There were 144 or 46.2% who were born in the same canton, while 43 or 13.8% were born somewhere else in Switzerland, and 28 or 9.0% were born outside of Switzerland.

In 2008 there were 4 live births to Swiss citizens and 2 births to non-Swiss citizens, and in same time span there was 1 death of a Swiss citizen and 1 non-Swiss citizen death. Ignoring immigration and emigration, the population of Swiss citizens increased by 3 while the foreign population increased by 1. There was 1 Swiss man who emigrated from Switzerland. At the same time, there were 8 non-Swiss men and 7 non-Swiss women who immigrated from another country to Switzerland. The total Swiss population change in 2008 (from all sources, including moves across municipal borders) was a decrease of 7 and the non-Swiss population increased by 15 people. This represents a population growth rate of 2.2%.

The age distribution, as of 2009, in Peney-le-Jorat is; 51 children or 13.5% of the population are between 0 and 9 years old and 63 teenagers or 16.7% are between 10 and 19. Of the adult population, 35 people or 9.3% of the population are between 20 and 29 years old. 48 people or 12.7% are between 30 and 39, 68 people or 18.0% are between 40 and 49, and 45 people or 11.9% are between 50 and 59. The senior population distribution is 34 people or 9.0% of the population are between 60 and 69 years old, 19 people or 5.0% are between 70 and 79, there are 13 people or 3.4% who are between 80 and 89, and there is 1 person who is 90 and older.

As of 2000, there were 140 people who were single and never married in the village. There were 158 married individuals, 5 widows or widowers and 9 individuals who are divorced.

As of 2000 the average number of residents per living room was 0.61 which is about equal to the cantonal average of 0.61 per room. In this case, a room is defined as space of a housing unit of at least 4 m^{2} (43 sq ft) as normal bedrooms, dining rooms, living rooms, kitchens and habitable cellars and attics. About 62.1% of the total households were owner occupied, or in other words did not pay rent (though they may have a mortgage or a rent-to-own agreement).

As of 2000, there were 114 private households in the village, and an average of 2.7 persons per household. There were 25 households that consist of only one person and 8 households with five or more people. Out of a total of 116 households that answered this question, 21.6% were households made up of just one person. Of the rest of the households, there are 37 married couples without children, 45 married couples with children There were 6 single parents with a child or children. There was 1 household that was made up of unrelated people and 2 households that were made up of some sort of institution or another collective housing.

In 2000 there were 37 single family homes (or 48.1% of the total) out of a total of 77 inhabited buildings. There were 16 multi-family buildings (20.8%), along with 22 multi-purpose buildings that were mostly used for housing (28.6%) and 2 other use buildings (commercial or industrial) that also had some housing (2.6%). Of the single family homes 15 were built before 1919, while 4 were built between 1990 and 2000. The most multi-family homes (7) were built before 1919 and the next most (4) were built between 1971 and 1980.

In 2000 there were 124 apartments in the village. The most common apartment size was 5 rooms of which there were 39. There were 5 single room apartments and 59 apartments with five or more rooms. Of these apartments, a total of 103 apartments (83.1% of the total) were permanently occupied, while 17 apartments (13.7%) were seasonally occupied and 4 apartments (3.2%) were empty. As of 2009, the construction rate of new housing units was 0 new units per 1000 residents. The vacancy rate for the village, in 2010, was 0.66%.

The historical population is given in the following chart:

== Politics ==
In the 2007 federal election the most popular party was the SVP which received 22.5% of the vote. The next three most popular parties were the FDP (22.15%), the SP (16.35%) and the Green Party (14.32%). In the federal election, a total of 118 votes were cast, and the voter turnout was 50.6%.

== Economy ==
As of 2010, Peney-le-Jorat had an unemployment rate of 2.4%. As of 2008, there were 33 people employed in the primary economic sector and about 10 businesses involved in this sector. 11 people were employed in the secondary sector and there were 2 businesses in this sector. 45 people were employed in the tertiary sector, with 11 businesses in this sector. There were 152 residents of the village who were employed in some capacity, of which females made up 42.1% of the workforce.

In 2008 the total number of full-time equivalent jobs was 71. The number of jobs in the primary sector was 24, all of which were in agriculture. The number of jobs in the secondary sector was 10, all of which were in manufacturing. The number of jobs in the tertiary sector was 37. In the tertiary sector; 20 or 54.1% were in the sale or repair of motor vehicles, 3 or 8.1% were in the movement and storage of goods, 5 or 13.5% were in a hotel or restaurant, 1 was a technical professional or scientist, 2 or 5.4% were in education.

In 2000, there were 30 workers who commuted into the village and 92 workers who commuted away. The village is a net exporter of workers, with about 3.1 workers leaving the village for every one entering. Of the working population, 5.3% used public transportation to get to work, and 57.9% used a private car.

== Religion ==
From the 2000 census, 50 or 16.0% were Roman Catholic, while 201 or 64.4% belonged to the Swiss Reformed Church. Of the rest of the population, there were 3 members of an Orthodox church (or about 0.96% of the population), and there was 1 individual who belongs to another Christian church. There was 1 individual who was Islamic. There was 1 person who was Hindu. 50 (or about 16.03% of the population) belonged to no church, are agnostic or atheist, and 5 individuals (or about 1.60% of the population) did not answer the question.

== Education ==
In Peney-le-Jorat about 109 or (34.9%) of the population have completed non-mandatory upper secondary education, and 52 or (16.7%) have completed additional higher education (either University or a Fachhochschule). Of the 52 who completed tertiary schooling, 57.7% were Swiss men, 36.5% were Swiss women.

In the 2009/2010 school year there were a total of 53 students in the Peney-le-Jorat school district. In the Vaud cantonal school system, two years of non-obligatory pre-school are provided by the political districts. During the school year, the political district provided pre-school care for a total of 296 children of which 96 children (32.4%) received subsidized pre-school care. The canton's primary school program requires students to attend for four years. There were 34 students in the municipal primary school program. The obligatory lower secondary school program lasts for six years and there were 19 students in those schools.

As of 2000, there were 5 students in Peney-le-Jorat who came from another village, while 55 residents attended schools outside the village.
