= Tessenberg =

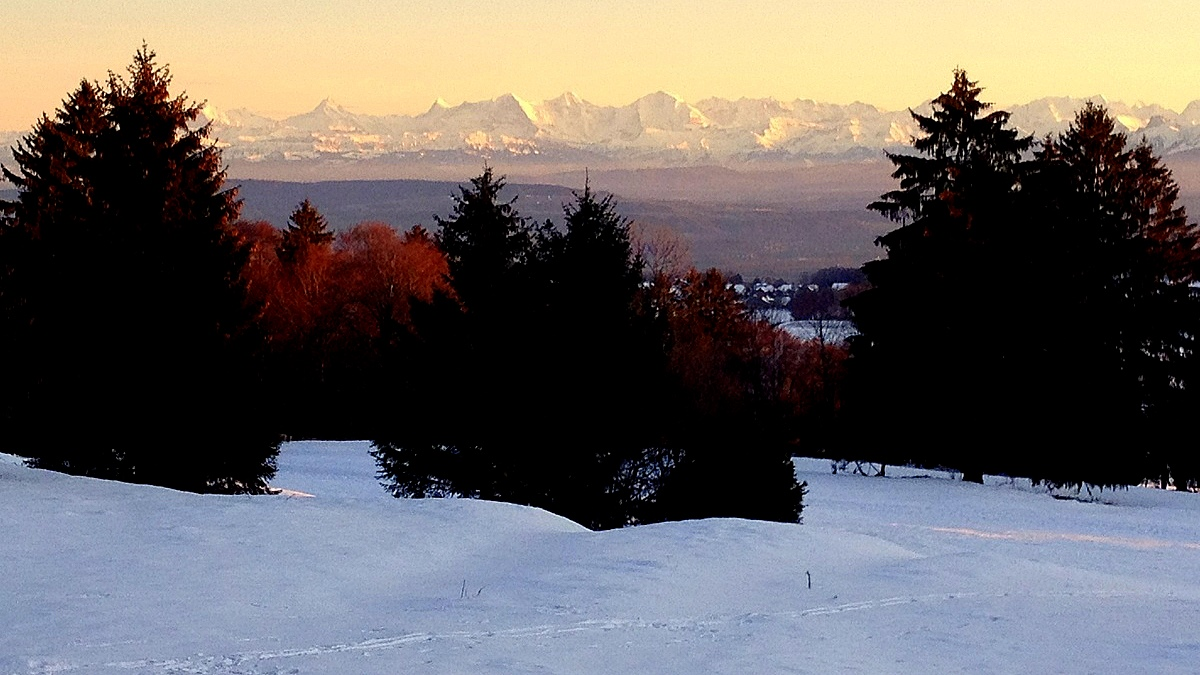
View towards Prêles

Tessenberg (French: Montagne de Diesse or Plateau de Diesse) is an elevated plateau in Switzerland. It is located above Lake Biel, on the southern slopes of Chasseral, at an elevation of about 800 m. It is divided between the Swiss cantons of Bern and Neuchâtel, and three municipalities, Nods, Lignières and Plateau de Diesse.

The plateau is drained by Twannbach to the east and by Ruisseau de Vaux to the south-west, both emptying into Lake Biel, and as such part of the Aare basin.

It can be reached by a funicular, the Vinifuni Ligerz–Prêles, from Ligerz railway station.

== History ==
The area was part of the dominion of the Counts of Neuchâtel from the 12th century. It was later administered jointly by the counts of Neuchâtel and the Prince-bishopric of Basel and Bern. Tessenberg was occupied by French troops in December 1797 and partly adjoined to the French département Mont-Terrible. The territory was returned to Switzerland, as part of the canton of Bern (Erlach District, after 1846 La Neuveville District), following the Congress of Vienna of 1815.
