= Jack Rollan =

Swiss radio host and satirist

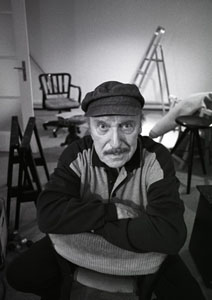
- Born: Louis Plomb; March 3, 1916; Lausanne, Switzerland
- Died: May 3, 2007 (aged 91); Lausanne, Switzerland
- Occupations: Radio host, satirist, journalist
- Spouse(s): Lina Lucie Clerc (m. 1937); Irène Hélène Betanelli (m. 2004)

Jack Rollan (born Louis Plomb; 3 March 1916 – 3 May 2007) was a Swiss radio host, satirist, and journalist, best known for his work at Radio romande and for co-founding Swiss Solidarity in 1946. He was born and died in Lausanne, and was a citizen of Geneva.

== Life and career ==
Rollan was the son of Henri Gustave Plomb and Clotilde Alice Wuilleumier. He attended primary school in Lausanne and completed an apprenticeship as a photographer. He subsequently worked as a theatre props assistant and extra, then as a traveling singer, before turning to radio.

His satirical style, marked by self-deprecation and provocation, made him an inventive host at Radio romande from 1941 to 1952. He became particularly well known through his program Bonjour, which he initially presented alone before being joined by Jane Savigny, with whom he formed the duo Jane et Jack. In 1946, together with Roger Nordmann, he launched Swiss Solidarity, giving radio a humanitarian dimension of considerable scope. He also founded his own satirical publication, Le Bon Jour de Jack Rollan (1952–1959), and wrote numerous columns, notably in La Suisse, as well as several non-conformist books.

He married Lina Lucie Clerc (daughter of Charles Louis) in 1937, and Irène Hélène Betanelli, née Delessert (daughter of Paul), in 2004.

== Bibliography ==
- M. Baettig, J.-R. Probst, Les Suisses qui font rire, 1984
- F. Fornerod, Lausanne, le temps des audaces, 1993, pp. 15–16, 115–117, 127–129
- DTS, 1517
