= Deputyship (Switzerland) =

Swiss legal instrument

Deputyship (Note: German: Beistandschaft; French: curatelle; Italian: curatela) is a Swiss legal instrument that replaced guardianship (German: Vormundschaft, French: tutelle) in adult protection law on 1 January 2013. It enables the officially ordered legal representation of a person of legal age who lacks the capacity of judgment.

The regulation of deputyship of minors in child protection law is set out in Art. 327a-c of the Swiss Civil Code, which came into force on 1 January 2013. The provisions of adult protection law, namely on the appointment of the deputy, the management of the deputyship and the involvement of the adult protection authority, apply mutatis mutandis.

== Types of deputyships ==
Since 1 January 2013, a distinction has been made between three different types of deputyship and the general deputyship. The previous category of custodial deprivation of liberty has been replaced by the new category of custodial placement. The new body is the Child and Adult Protection Authority (KESB, APEA, ARP).

The law distinguishes between the

- Assistance deputyship (Art. 393),
- Representative deputyship (Art. 394 & 395) and
- Advisory deputyship (Art. 396) and
- General deputyship (Art. 398).

The areas of responsibility of the deputyship may include personal care, property care or legal affairs, and should correspond to the needs of the person concerned (Art. 391).

== History ==
=== Medieval origins and terminology ===
In medieval documents, guardians were referred to as advocatus (which gave rise to the German Vogt) or curator, while their charges were called pupillus. Alongside guardianship (Latin tutela, German Vogtei), curatorship (Latin curatela, German Beistand) appeared in the 16th century.

Roman law established a distinction between tutela and cura. The former was exercised over minors until their majority (14, then 18 years for men; 12, then 14 years for women). Beyond this age, the persons concerned received a curator (until 25 years for men, until their death for unmarried women). Upon marriage, women entered into the cura of their husband; if he died before them, a guardian was imposed upon them. The term guardian comes from the Latin tueri meaning to protect; similarly, the Old High German munt (protection) is the origin of Vormund (guardian) and Mündel (the minor ward who needs protection due to their status of legal incapacity). Among the persons requiring protection were mainly minor orphans, women, disabled people, the sick, as well as weak persons and those lacking discernment.

=== Germanic law tradition ===
Germanic law considered guardianship as an exclusively family affair, which is why a guardian could only be a member from the family clan. The guardian had usufruct of his ward's property (which, according to legal maxim, should neither grow nor diminish), but could not dispose of it. If he sold real estate, the act was suspended until the ward's majority, who then had a right of revocation. With the development of commerce, the legal uncertainty and blockages resulting from traditional rules proved increasingly difficult to bear; thus the guardian became the minor's representative, with the benefit of a power of attorney. This new legal situation, however, carried the risk of dishonest use of the minor's property.

For this reason, the guardian was imposed with the obligation to keep accounting records, and with the formation of the modern state, it became necessary to establish an authority responsible for taking measures against abuses and regulating guardianship. It was especially the imperial ordinances of 1548 and 1577 that provided the impetus for creating guardianship authorities. The Council appointed the guardian, who could refuse this civic duty only under certain conditions.

The new regulation brought about a radical change: from guardianship falling exclusively under family law, there was a shift to state-controlled guardianship. This evolution raised the question of whether guardianship law henceforth belonged to public law.

=== 19th and 20th century developments ===
Guardianship was maintained in private law by all cantonal codifications of the 19th century and by the Swiss Civil Code that entered into force in 1912, which integrated it into family law.

The provisions of the Civil Code presented a paternalistic character and a will to subjugate, particularly toward women and marginalized groups. Until around the end of the 19th century, guardians were exclusively male, chosen first exclusively, then primarily, from the ward's relatives. Mothers were excluded from guardianship of their children, except in the cantons of Geneva, Vaud, and Neuchâtel, in case of widowhood (first mention in a testament of 1256). The mother exercised parental authority over her children but was herself placed under curatorship.

=== Modern reforms ===
In 2013, a full revision of guardianship law entered into force, aimed at better respecting the principle of proportionality, improving the protection of individual rights, and professionalizing practices.

== Bibliography ==
- Taban, Özlem (2012). "Das neue Schweizer Erwachsenenschutzrecht". Interdisziplinäre Zeitschrift für Familienrecht (in German) (2): 80–85.
- Noser, Walter; Rosch, Daniel (2016). Erwachsenenschutz: Das neue Gesetz umfassend erklärt - mit Praxisbeispielen (in German) (3 ed.). Zürich: Beobachter-Edition. ISBN 978-3-85569-999-5.
- E. Huber, ''System und Geschichte des Schweizerischen Privatrechts'', 4, 1893
- J.-F. Poudret, ''Coutumes et coutumiers'', 2, 1998
- H. Hausheer et al., ''Das neue Erwachsenenschutzrecht'', 2010
- Ph. Meier, S. Lukic, ''Introd. au nouveau droit de la protection de l'adulte'', 2011
