= Sottens transmitter =

Medium wave transmitter in Vaud, Switzerland

Coordinates: 46°39′21.91″N 6°43′44.27″E

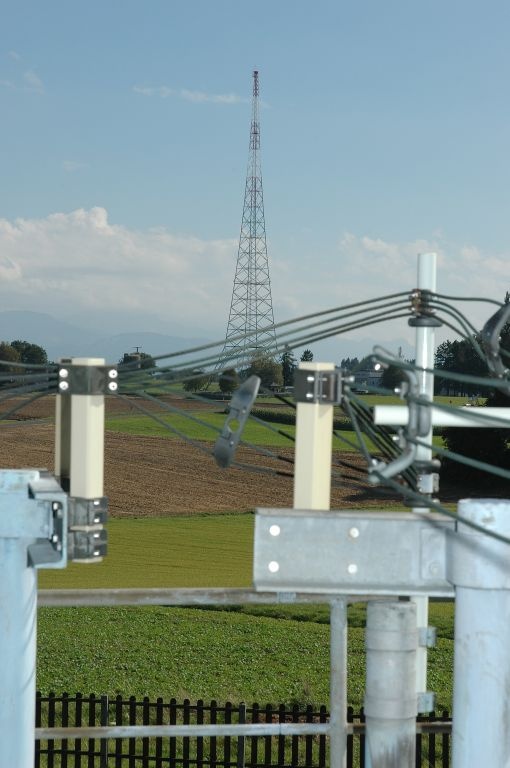

The Sottens Transmitter was the nationwide broadcast transmitter for French-speaking Switzerland. The transmitter is located at Sottens, Canton of Vaud, Switzerland. It was run on 765 kHz with a power of 600 kilowatts and was easily receivable during the night throughout the whole of Europe. Since 1989 the aerial used has been a centre-fed dipole fixed on the outside of a 188-metre-high grounded freestanding steel framework tower. Before 1989 a 190-metre high self-radiating, free standing steel framework tower was used as a transmission aerial. The Sottens transmitter most recently broadcast the Option Musique radio programme from Radio Suisse Romande, up until 5 December 2010.

There is also a 125-metre-tall (410 ft) free-standing lattice tower on the site. This tower was built in 1931 as one of a pair, which until 1958 carried between them a T-antenna for medium wave broadcasting. The second tower was dismantled in that year and rebuilt in Dole as a TV transmission tower. This tower is insulated from ground to form a tower radiator and is used as backup antenna.

After the shutdown of RSR on MW, the antenna was later used for ham radio experiments in February 2011, using both standard AM and DRM in the 80 m band.

== See also ==
- Lattice tower
