= Radio in Switzerland =

Radio broadcasting in Switzerland (list of stations and history)

Radio in Switzerland refers to the history and development of radio broadcasting in Switzerland, from its early experimental phases in the 1920s to the modern era of digital broadcasting and commercial competition. Switzerland hosts radio stations broadcasting in all its native languages: French, German, Italian, and Rumantsch.

== History ==
=== Early experiments for military and economic use ===
The international history of radio began in 1896 with the wireless telegraphy patent filed by Guglielmo Marconi, who had conducted his first experiments in Salvan, Switzerland. In Switzerland, as in many other countries, military personnel conducted the first significant radio experiments in 1905. However, the equipment of the Swiss army with radiotelegraphy and radiotelephony remained modest until after World War I.

From 1911, the Federal Council authorized civilian use of radiotelegraphy and granted several reception concessions. Watchmakers were among the first to show interest, receiving time signals transmitted from Paris starting in 1910. Commercial use of radiotelegraphy began in 1922 with the installation of Marconi Radio Station SA (later Radio Suisse SA from 1928 to 1988) in Münchenbuchsee.

Radiotelegraphy soon evolved into radiotelephony, initially used primarily for aviation. The first professional Swiss transmitters were put into service in 1921 for the airfields of Kloten and Dübendorf, and in 1922 for those of Cointrin (Geneva) and Lausanne.

=== Pioneer era (1923-1930) ===
The triumphant advance of radio as a medium of information and entertainment began in the early 1920s in the United States. Switzerland participated in this movement, even though it did not house any major radio industry. As the supreme supervisory authority, the Federal Council continued to heavily regulate radio communication. It authorized non-commercial broadcasting experiments in 1923 by the aviation stations of Geneva, Lausanne and Kloten (Zurich), which led to the creation of several companies, some of which built their own transmitters: Lausanne (1923), Zurich (1924), Bern (1925), Geneva (1925) and Basel (1926).

The new medium was fascinating to the public. Reception concessions increased from around one thousand at the end of 1923 to more than 100,000 in 1930, despite obvious shortcomings: long lectures (up to one hour) that were difficult to understand, poor technical quality with interference that often prevented full enjoyment of musical and theatrical broadcasts. Radio programs generally adopted known forms: concerts, operas, theatre plays, information notices, lectures, sermons, or readings. However, radio pioneers also developed innovative genres such as themed literary or musical programs, montages combining literary quotations, music and reports, radio serials and radio plays which, thanks to recording technology, were increasingly broadcast on delay rather than live.

Radio programs provided broad sections of the population with access to literary and musical culture. While providing practical and social information, they had a lasting influence on musical life and creation, particularly in the field of popular and entertainment music.

=== Golden age of national transmitters (1931-mid-1960s) ===
By the late 1920s, Switzerland experienced its first radio crisis as most small stations lacked sufficient revenue from fees to continuously produce internationally competitive programming. The Federal Council therefore encouraged a national organization of broadcasting and limited the program offering to three national transmitters, located in each linguistic region: Beromünster, Sottens, and Monte Ceneri. It modeled its radio policy on the BBC model, managed as a public service since 1927, and undertook radio reform in 1931 by creating the Swiss Broadcasting Corporation (SRG SSR).

The SSR was conceived as a national organization responsible for providing programs for the entire country and as a monopoly enterprise without profit motive, financed by license fees and enjoying the greatest possible independence from commercial, political or governmental interests. The programs were not only to inform and entertain, but also contribute to continuing education, cultural development and integration. The national transmitters positioned themselves primarily as intermediaries between cities, countryside and mountain regions, playing an important role in spiritual national defense, which they interpreted in a rather conservative sense.

The treatment of various political tendencies caused numerous conflicts. The left in particular complained (through the Arbeiter-Radio-Bund, an association specializing in radio-related issues) that their opinions were not sufficiently considered in programming. The SSR had to accept strict obligations in news coverage: to protect the print press, its news service was limited to brief bulletins and was required until 1971 to rely on communiqués from the Swiss Telegraphic Agency.

Financial equalization between radio stations, introduced in 1927, was institutionalized in the concession granted to the SSR. Since then, programs produced for linguistic minorities have been co-financed by contributions from German-speaking Switzerland. Within a few years, radio became the most widespread medium: there were 500,000 receiver licenses in 1937 and 1 million in 1950. Foreign transmitters also attracted keen interest in Switzerland. Particularly for musical and entertainment programs, national transmitters struggled to compete with their often wealthier competitors capable of offering greater quality and diversity.

In 1931, to encourage radio listening in regions with poor reception conditions, the Federal Council authorized the construction of private cable networks (Rediffusion, Allgemeine Radibus). Simultaneously, the PTT began developing telediffusion, the transmission of radio programs via the telephone network (1931-1998).

During the crisis and war years (1933-1945), national transmitters became important information channels beyond national borders, as they clearly distinguished themselves from the propaganda of neighboring countries' state radios. Certain personalities, such as Jean Rodolphe de Salis, René Payot, and Fulvio Bolla, gained great notoriety through their regular analysis of current events.

=== Radio as an accompanying medium (late 1960s-1980s) ===
In the 1960s, the rise of television as the primary medium, the emergence of a new youth culture, and changes in listening habits (decline of attentive and motivated listening) forced the SSR to revise its offerings. It did so by drawing inspiration from the BBC and commercial broadcasting in the United States, where radio had already functioned as an accompanying medium since the 1950s, notably through the rapid spread of portable transistor radios (from 1953). Program formatting (creating specific musical atmospheres) made it possible to retain specific target groups.

At the end of the 1960s, the SSR gave its two channels clear profiles: the first offering variety music, entertainment, regular news and various service programs (particularly for the increasingly numerous target group of motorists), the second dedicated to classical music and cultural programs. However, the SSR poorly met the expectations of the younger generation, who aspired to listen to pop and rock music, and an ever-growing public chose foreign stations (Radio Luxembourg, SWF 3, private Italian transmitters, etc.). Overall, radio continued its development: the 2 million license milestone was reached in 1974.

=== Rise of local and commercial radio stations (from 1983) ===
The last major upheaval in the Swiss radio landscape occurred in the late 1970s, when commercial pirate transmitters installed abroad (such as Radio 24 by Roger Schawinski from 1979) and clandestine transmitters installed in Switzerland began broadcasting pop and rock music for young audiences, too neglected by the SSR. The Federal Council reacted in 1983 by granting experimental licenses to private local radio stations, which had the right to finance themselves through advertising. Simultaneously, the SSR obtained a concession for a third channel, dedicated to pop and rock programs.

The structural reform phase ended in 1992 with the entry into force of the new Federal Act on Radio and Television. From the moment commercial competition was authorized, the entire radio sector took on a new orientation, more attentive to the public and demand. Programs became increasingly formatted. The multiplication of stations resulted in only limited diversification of content. Nevertheless, market liberalization caused a renaissance of radio, manifested by longer listening times.

Since radio had become an accompanying medium, it was listened to while pursuing another activity. This phenomenon had a significant impact on the production of music and information programs: while music was increasingly used to create atmosphere, information was often limited to simple headline reminders that gave listeners the impression of being informed. However, demanding cultural channels remained, presenting music to discover or deepening current events through reflection and analysis programs.

Since the late 1990s, radio stations have increasingly used the Internet as a digital broadcasting channel, offering their usual programs as well as additional services such as program information, archives, or the possibility of listening to programs at any time through podcasting. Digital broadcasting through Digital Audio Broadcasting (DAB), encouraged by the Federal Council since 1999, has been slowly adopted despite its technical advantages.

== List of radio stations ==
=== German language ===
- Schweizer Radio und Fernsehen:
  - SRF 1
  - SRF 2 Kultur
  - SRF 3
  - SRF 4 News
  - SRF Musikwelle
  - SRF Virus
- Private:
  - Radio 24
  - neo1
  - neo2
  - Radio Pilatus
  - Radio Zürisee
  - ENERGY Hits
  - Luna
  - FM1
  - Radio Sunshine
  - Radio Argovia
  - my105
  - Radio Eviva
  - Radio Tell
  - Rockit Radio
  - Vintage Radio
  - Virgin Radio Switzerland
- Community:
  - Radio 3fach
  - Radio Blind Power
  - RadioIndustrie
  - Radio Kaiseregg
  - Kanal K
  - Radio LoRa
  - Radio RaBe
  - Radio RaSa
  - Radio Stadtfilter
  - toxic.fm
  - Radio X

=== French language ===
- Radio Télévision Suisse:
  - Première
  - Espace 2
  - Couleur 3
  - Option Musique
- Private:
  - RFJ
  - RJB
  - LFM
  - One FM
  - Radio Chablais
  - Radio Fribourg
  - Radio Lac
  - Radio ORBITAL
  - Rouge FM
  - RTN
  - GRRIF
- Community:
  - Cité
  - Fréquence Banane
  - Meyrin FM
  - Spoon Radio
  - Radio Django
  - Loose Antenna

=== Italian language ===
- Radiotelevisione Svizzera:
  - Rete Uno
  - Rete Due
  - Rete Tre
- Private:
  - Radio3iii
  - Radio Fiume Ticino
  - 1.FM (Italia On Air)
  - Radio Gwendalyn
  - Radio Morcote International

=== Rumantsch language ===
- Radiotelevisiun Svizra Rumantscha
  - Radio Rumantsch

=== English language ===
- Swiss Satellite Radio
  - Radio Swiss Classic
  - Radio Swiss Pop
  - Radio Swiss Jazz
- World Radio Switzerland
- Swissgroove
- Swissinfo
- Switzerland in Sound

=== Tamil language ===
- Thaalam Radio

=== Liechtenstein ===
- Radio Liechtenstein, established as Radio L in 1995, since 2003 operated by the public Liechtensteinischer Rundfunk (LRF) broadcaster. Ceased broadcasting.

== See also ==
- Communications in Switzerland
- Media of Switzerland

== Bibliography ==
- E. Schade, «Radio: ein vielschichtiges Instrument für Massenkonsum», in Hist. de la société de consommation, éd. J. Tanner et al., 1998, 237-255
- M.T. Drack, dir., La radio et la télévision en Suisse: hist. de la Société suisse de radiodiffusion SSR jusqu'en 1958, 2 vol., 2000
- E. Schade, Herrenlose Radiowellen, 2000
- Th. Mäusli, A. Steigmeier, éd., La radio et la télévision en Suisse: hist. de la Société suisse de radiodiffusion et télévision SSR 1958-1983, 2006
- M. Dumermuth, «Rundfunkregulierung - Alte und neue Herausforderungen», in Ordnung durch Medienpolitik?, éd. O. Jarren, P. Donges, 2007, 351-397
