= List of German-language radio stations =

This is a list of radio stations with German language broadcasts.

== Austrian radio stations ==
See: List of radio stations in Austria and Liechtenstein

=== ORF (Österreichischer Rundfunk / Austrian Broadcasting) ===
- National
  - Ö1 (Classical Music)
  - Ö3 (Contemporary)
  - FM4 (Youth, part English and part German language)
- International
  - Radio Österreich 1 International (via Short Wave)
  - Radio 1476 (Cultural, AM)

=== Commercial stations ===
- Krone Hit Radio (FM)
- Energy Wien 104.2 (FM)

=== Community radio stations ===
- Radiofabrik 107.5 and 97.3 MHz (FM)

== German radio stations ==
=== ARD ===
- NDR (Norddeutscher Rundfunk / North German Broadcasting)

Target area: Northern Germany (Hamburg, Lower Saxony, Schleswig-Holstein, Mecklenburg-Western Pomerania)

  - NDR 1 (Oldies), completely different versions for each state.
  - NDR 2 (Adult Contemporary)
  - NDR 90,3 (State program for Hamburg)
  - NDR Blue (Music off the charts)
  - NDR Kultur (Classical music, culture)
  - NDR Info (News and information, culture)
  - NDR Info Spezial (Information with live breaks)
  - NDR Schlager (Schlager music)
  - N-Joy (Youth)
- Radio Bremen
  - Bremen Eins (Oldies)
  - Bremen Zwei (culture, information)
  - Bremen Next (youth)
  - Bremen Vier (Youth)
- WDR (Westdeutscher Rundfunk / West German Broadcasting)

Target area: North Rhine-Westphalia

  - 1LIVE (Youth)
  - 1LIVE diggi (youth)
  - COSMO (cooperation with radiobremen and rbb)
  - WDR 2 (Adult Contemporary)
  - WDR 3 (Classical music, culture)
  - WDR 4 (Oldies)
  - WDR 5 (News and information, culture)
  - WDR Event (event program)
  - WDR Maus (kids program)
- SR (Saarländischer Rundfunk / Saarland Broadcasting)
  - Antenne Saar (information)
  - SR 1 (Contemporary)
  - SR Kultur (Culture)
  - SR 3 Saarlandwelle (Traditional music)
  - Dasding (Youth)
- RBB (Rundfunk Berlin-Brandenburg / Broadcasting of Berlin-Brandenburg)
  - radioeins (accompanying program)
  - radio 3 (culture)
  - rbb 88,8
  - Antenne Brandenburg
  - Fritz (Youth)
  - rbb24 Inforadio (information)
- MDR (Mitteldeutscher Rundfunk / Central German Broadcasting)

Target area: Saxony, Saxony-Anhalt, Thuringia;

  - MDR Sachsen
  - MDR Sputnik (Youth)
  - MDR Jump (Adult Contemporary)
  - MDR Klassik (classical music)
  - MDR Kultur (Culture)
  - MDR aktuell (News and information)
  - MDR Schlagerwelt (Schlager music)
  - MDR Tweens (kids program)
- HR (Hessischer Rundfunk / Hessian Broadcasting)
  - hr1 (Oldies, information)
  - hr2 (Culture, classical music)
  - hr3 (Adult Contemporary)
  - hr4 (Traditional music)
  - hr-info (information)
  - Dasding (Youth)
- SWR (Südwestrundfunk / Southwest Broadcasting)

Target area: Baden-Württemberg and Rhineland-Palatinate

  - SWR1 (Oldies), during the day different versions for each state.
  - SWR3 (Adult Contemporary)
  - SWR4 (Traditional music), during the day different versions for each state.
  - Dasding (Youth)
  - SWR aktuell (news and information)
  - SWR kultur (Culture)
- BR (Bayerischer Rundfunk / Bavarian Broadcasting)
  - Bayern 1 (Oldies)
  - Bayern 2 (Culture, information)
  - Bayern 3 (Adult Contemporary)
  - BR Heimat (folk music)
  - BR-Klassik (Classical Music)
  - BR24 (News non stop)
  - BR Schlager (Schlager music)
- National radio stations
  - Deutschlandfunk (News- and Cultural programme, FM, MW, LW, SW)
  - Deutschlandradio Kultur (Cultural programme, FM, MW, LW, SW)
  - Deutschlandfunk Nova (Youth radio, FM, MW, LW, SW)

=== Commercial stations ===
==== National ====
- RTL Radio (FM)
- Klassik Radio (FM)
- Jam FM
- Radio Melodie (FM)
- sunshine live (FM)
- Evangeliums-Rundfunk (religious, AM)

==== Regional (by federal states) ====
- Schleswig-Holstein
  - Delta Radio (FM)
  - Radio Nora (FM)
  - Radio Schleswig-Holstein (FM) (often abbreviated RSH, properly R.SH)
  - Power 612 (AM) disfunct
- Hamburg
  - Radio Hamburg (FM)
  - alster radio (FM)
  - Oldie 95 (FM)
  - Energy Hamburg 97.1 (FM)
- Bremen
  - Energy Bremen (FM)
- Lower Saxony
  - Radio ffn (FM)
  - Hit-Radio Antenne (FM)
  - Radio 21 (FM)
- Mecklenburg-Western Pomerania
  - 80s80s MV (FM)
  - Ostseewelle HIT-RADIO Mecklenburg-Vorpommern (FM)
- North Rhine-Westphalia
  - Radio NRW (More than 40 local and noncommercial radio stations) (FM)
  - Radio Q (Münster) (FM)
  - Eldoradio (Dortmund) (FM)
  - Radio Kiepenkerl – Dülmen
  - Schlager-Radio – Hilden
- Rhineland-Palatinate
  - RPR 1. (FM)
  - big FM (FM)
  - Rockland Radio (FM)
  - Antenne West (FM)
  - Antenne Koblenz (FM)
- Saarland
  - Radio Salü (FM)
  - big FM (FM)
  - Europe 1 (located in Felsberg-Berus, LW)
- Baden-Württemberg
  - statewide
    - Hit-Radio Antenne 1 (located in Stuttgart, FM)
    - big FM (located in Stuttgart, FM)
    - Radio Regenbogen (located in Mannheim, FM)
    - Radio 7 (located in Ulm, FM)
  - local
    - Radio Ton (located in Heilbronn, local station for Württembergisch-Franken, Ostwürttemberg and Neckar-Alb, FM)
    - Hit 1 (located in and local station for Karlsruhe, FM)
    - Energy Stuttgart (located in Waiblingen, local station for the northern part of Stuttgart, FM)
    - Die Neue 107.7 Nonstop Pop und Rock (local station for the eastern part of Stuttgart, FM)
    - Donau 3 FM (located in Ulm local station for the Donau-Iller region, FM)
    - R.TV Radio (located in Böblingen, local station of the southwest region of Stuttgart / Freudenstadt, FM)
    - Hitradio Ohr, (located in Offenburg, FM)
    - baden.fm, (located in Freiburg, local station for southern Baden, FM)
    - Radio Neckarburg, (located in Eschbronn, local station for Schwarzwald-Baar, FM)
    - Radio Seefunk, (located in Konstanz, FM)
    - Radio VHR (24h Livestream, Schlager und Volksmusik Hitradio, www.radio-vhr.de)
- Bavaria
  - Antenne Bayern (FM)
  - Energy München 93.3 (FM)
  - Energy Nürnberg (FM)
  - Radio Galaxy (FM)
  - Radio Gong 96.3 (FM)
  - Radio Charivari (FM)
  - Hitradio RT1 96.7 FM (FM)
  - RSA Radio Allgäu (FM)
  - BLR (FM)
- Hesse
  - Hit Radio FFH (FM)
  - planet more music radio (FM)
  - harmony.fm (FM)
  - Radio Bob! (FM)
  - Main FM (FM)
- Thuringia
  - Antenne Thüringen (FM)
  - Landeswelle Thüringen (FM)
  - Radio TOP 40 (FM)
- Saxony
  - statewide
    - Radio PSR (FM)
    - Hitradio RTL (FM)
    - Energy Sachsen s. NRJ (FM)
    - R.SA (FM)
    - Apollo Radio (FM)
  - local
    - Radio Dresden (local station for Dresden, FM)
    - Radio Leipzig (local station for Leipzig, FM)
    - Radio Chemnitz (local station for Chemnitz, FM)
    - Radio Lausitz (local station for Lusatia (Lausitz), FM)
    - Radio Zwickau (local station for Zwickau, FM)
    - Radio Erzgebirge (local station for Ore Mountains, FM)
    - Vogtlandradio (local station for Vogtland, FM)
    - Radio Erzgebirge 107.7 (FM)
- Saxony-Anhalt
  - Radio SAW (FM)
  - 89.0 RTL (FM)
  - Radio Brocken (FM)
  - Rockland Sachsen-Anhalt (FM)
- Berlin / Brandenburg
  - 94.5 Radio Cottbus, local in South Brandenburg (FM)
  - Radio 98.2 Paradiso (FM)
  - 104.6 RTL, s. RTL Group (FM)
  - 104.9 OldieStar Radio (FM, DVB-T)
  - Berlin aktuell (closed, formerly FM)
  - BB Radio (FM)
  - Berliner Rundfunk 91.4 (FM)
  - BluRadio (FM)
  - Charlie 87.9, (closed, formerly FM)
  - 94.3 r.s.2, formerly RIAS 2 (FM)
  - Elsterwelle, locally in South Brandenburg and North Saxony (FM)
  - Energy Berlin, s. NRJ (FM)
  - Flux FM 100.6 (formerly Motor FM, FM)
  - Jazz Radio 101.9 (FM)
  - 98.8 Kiss FM (FM)
  - Metropol FM (FM)
  - Motor FM (FM)
  - Power Radio, local in Northeast Berlin (FM)
  - Radio Power 4, local in Northeast Brandenburg (closed, formerly FM)
  - Radio Russkij Berlin, for Russian community (FM)
  - Radio Teddy, children programmes (FM)
  - Sender KW, local in Southeast Berlin (FM)
  - 105.5 Spreeradio (FM)
  - star FM 87.9 maximum rock! (FM)

=== Civilian Radio ===
Education and (open) Civilian Radios (Ausbildungs- und offener Bürgerkanal) are non commercial radios with free access to the medium radio for training media competences (e.g. for students, school classes or individuals (e.g. voluntairs)).

- see Non Commercial local radio (German Wikipedia)

=== Liberal Radio ===
Liberal radio is non commercial and part of private radio for groups, local bands, civilian initiatives and single persons with (free) access to the medium radio. One of the main target of "Liberal radio" is to create a public opposition.

- see Liberal Radio (German Wikipedia)

== Swiss radio stations ==
See: List of radio stations in Switzerland

- SRF (SRG SSR idée suisse)
  - Radio SRF 1
  - Radio SRF 2 Kultur (Classical Music)
  - Radio SRF 3
  - Radio SRF 4 News (News)
  - Radio SRF Virus (Youth)
  - Radio SRF Musikwelle (News and traditional music)
  - Radio Swiss Pop
  - Radio Swiss Jazz
  - Radio Swiss Classic
- Association Of Swiss Internet Radio

== Other radio stations ==
- DW-Radio (Voice of Germany, International broadcasting in 30 languages, with a full-time program in German and English on Shortwave)
- Rai Sender Bozen, radio station based in Bolzano, Italy

== See also ==
- List of German language television channels
