= Schweizer Radio DRS =

Former Swiss German-language radio broadcaster

Coordinates: 47°24′04″N 8°32′08″E

SR DRS
- Type: Radio and online
- Country: Switzerland
- Launch date: 11 June 1931; 94 years ago
- Dissolved: 16 December 2012; 13 years ago
- Official website: http://www.drs.ch
- Replaced by: Schweizer Radio und Fernsehen

Schweizer Radio: Radio der deutschen und rätoromanischen Schweiz (SR DRS; "Swiss Radio: Radio of the German and Romansh Switzerland") was a company of SRG SSR which operated the public German-language radio stations of Switzerland from 1931 until 2012.

On 1 January 2011, Schweizer Fernsehen (SF) and Schweizer Radio DRS began the process of merging the two entities into Schweizer Radio und Fernsehen (SRF). On 16 December 2012, the merger was complete, with SF and SR DRS adopting the Schweizer Radio und Fernsehen (SRF) name.

== Broadcasting ==
SR DRS operated six radio stations which had a market share of over 60% in German-speaking Switzerland.

=== Radio stations ===
- DRS 1 (now SRF 1)
- DRS 2 Kultur (now SRF 2 Kultur)
- DRS 3 (now SRF 3)
- DRS Musikwelle (now SRF Musikwelle)
- DRS Virus (now SRF Virus)
- DRS 4 News (now SRF 4 News)
