= Swiss Broadcasting Corporation =

Public broadcasting agency of Switzerland

- Logo used since 2011

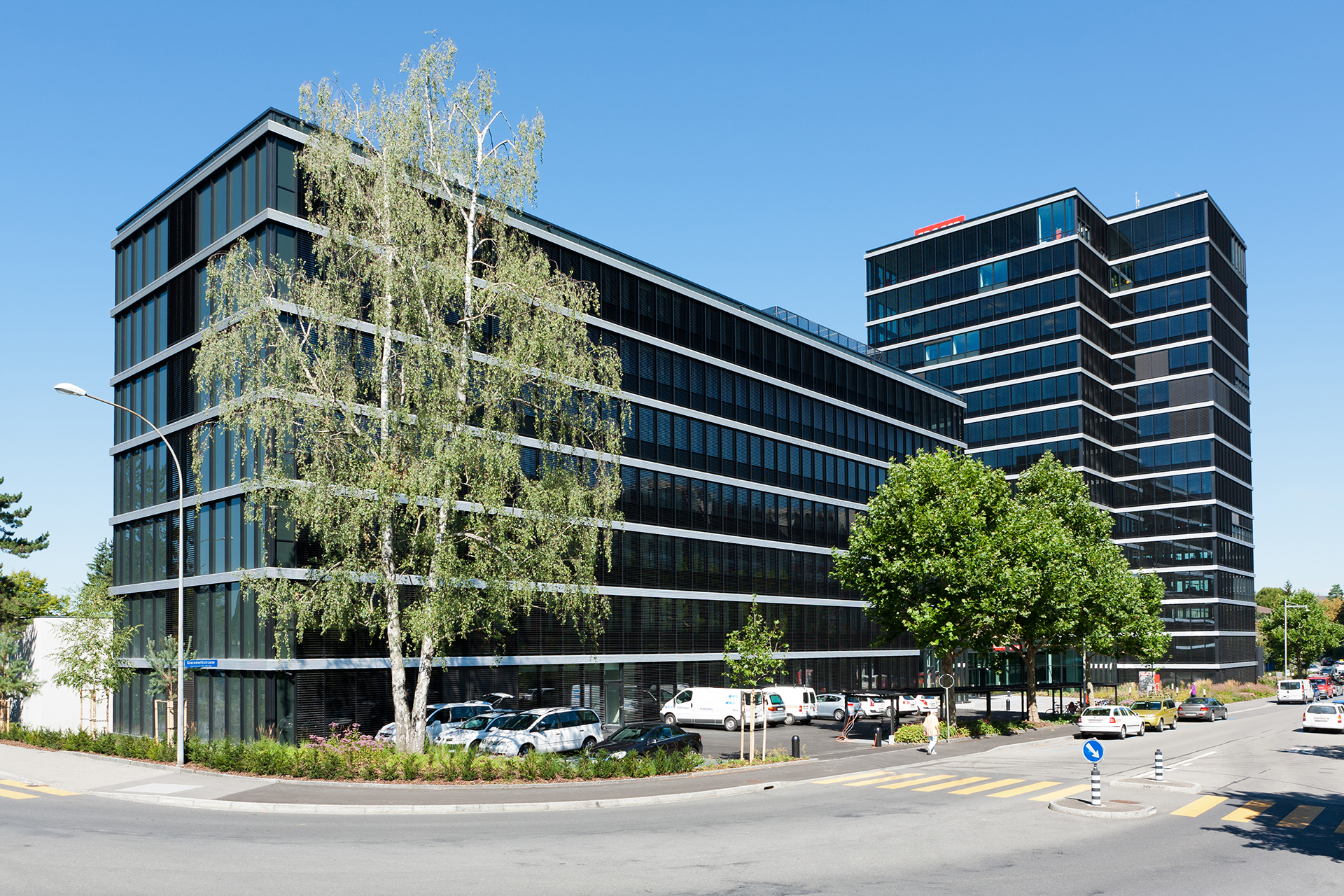
- The SRG SSR headquarters in Bern
- Type: Broadcast radio, television and online
- Branding: SRG SSR
- Country: Switzerland
- First air date: 30 September 1922; 104 years ago (radio); 20 July 1953; 73 years ago (television)
- Founded: 1931; 95 years ago
- TV stations: SRG SSR television channels: Schweizer Radio und Fernsehen (SRF): SRF 1, SRF zwei, SRF info; Radio Télévision Suisse (RTS): RTS 1, RTS 2; Radiotelevisione svizzera (RSI): RSI La 1, RSI La 2; Radiotelevisiun Svizra Rumantscha (RTR): Televisiun Rumantscha
- TV transmitters: Digital cable (DVB-C), Internet streaming, IPTV, DTH satellite
- Radio stations: SRG SSR radio stations: SRF: Radio SRF 1, Radio SRF 2 Kultur, Radio SRF 3, Radio SRF 4 News, Radio SRF Musikwelle, Radio SRF Virus; RTS: Première, Espace 2, Couleur 3, Option Musique; RSI: RSI Rete Uno, RSI Rete Due, RSI Rete Tre; RTR: Radio Rumantsch; SSatR: Radio Swiss Classic, Radio Swiss Jazz, Radio Swiss Pop
- Radio transmitters: Cable (DVB-C), DAB+, IPTV, Internet
- Market share: 30.3 and 37.90% (2013)
- Licence area: Switzerland
- Headquarters: Bern, Switzerland
- Broadcast area: Switzerland
- Owner: Public-law association funded by the Swiss government
- Key people: Jean-Michel Cina, Chairman of the SRG SSR Board of Directors; Gilles Marchand, Director-General
- Established: 1931; 95 years ago
- Former names: Schweizerische Rundspruchgesellschaft
- Affiliates: Presse TV; TV5Monde; 3sat; Arte
- Group: Swiss National Sound Archives; Swiss Solidarity; Memoriav; MAZ – Die Schweizer Journalistenschule
- Official website: www.srgssr.ch
- Subsidiary: Schweizer Radio und Fernsehen (SRF); Radio Télévision Suisse (RTS); Radiotelevisione svizzera (RSI); Radiotelevisiun Svizra Rumantscha (RTR); Swissinfo; SWISS TXT; Publisuisse

The Swiss Broadcasting Corporation (German: Schweizerische Radio- und Fernsehgesellschaft; French: Société suisse de radiodiffusion et télévision; Italian: Società svizzera di radiotelevisione; Romansh: Societad Svizra da Radio e Televisiun; SRG SSR) is the Swiss public broadcasting association, founded in 1931, the holding company of 24 radio and television channels. Headquartered in Bern, the Swiss Broadcasting Corporation is a non-profit organisation, funded mainly through radio and television licence fees (79%) and making the remaining income from advertising and sponsorship.

Switzerland's system of direct democracy and the fact that the country has four official languages (German, French, Italian and Romansh) mean that the structure of Swiss public service broadcasting is rather complicated. The actual holders of the broadcasting licences that enable SRG SSR to operate are four regional corporations:

- German Switzerland: Schweizer Radio und Fernsehen (SRF)
- French Switzerland: Radio télévision suisse (RTS)
- Italian Switzerland: Radiotelevisione svizzera di lingua italiana (RSI)
- Romansh: Radiotelevisiun Svizra Rumantscha (RTR)

These four corporations maintain SRG SSR as a joint central production and broadcasting association. The fifth business unit of SRG SSR is the ten-language news platform Swissinfo.

== Name ==
SRG SSR's logo, as SRG SSR idée suisse, used from 1999 to 2010

The association's official name is Schweizerische Radio- und Fernsehgesellschaft (SRG, formerly "Schweizerische Rundspruchgesellschaft") in German, Société suisse de radiodiffusion et télévision (SSR, formerly "Société suisse de radiodiffusion") in French, Società svizzera di radiotelevisione (SSR, formerly "Società svizzera di radiodiffusione") in Italian, and Societad svizra da radio e televisiun (SSR, formerly "Societad svizra da radio") in Romansh. The corporate name, SRG SSR, is derived from its initials in German and its initials in French, Italian and Romansh. In English, the organisation is known as the Swiss Broadcasting Corporation. The moniker "idée suisse" (French for 'Swiss idea'), which refers to the public service mission of the organisation, was adopted in 1999 and was removed from the name in 2010.

== History ==
SRG SSR "bolt" logo from 1985 to 1999

Europe's third public radio station started broadcasting from Lausanne in 1922, from the start based on a licence fee system. 980 licences were bought in 1923. Within a few years radio cooperatives working along the same principles had started throughout the country. In 1930 it was decided that radio was an important public service that should not be allowed to become a money maker for private interests, and that it needed to be structured on a federal basis. In 1931 SRG SSR was founded (see original names above), as a co-ordination organisation for the regional broadcast associations, and received the only licence to broadcast from the Federal Council. The same year it was agreed that all news reports in the new medium had to be provided by the Swiss news agency SDA, a decision that remained unchanged until 1971.

The first national transmitters began operating in 1931: Radio Sottens for French, Radio Beromünster for German, and 1933 Radio Monte Ceneri for Italian. In 1938 Romansh was recognised as the country's fourth national language, and the Zürich studios began broadcasting programmes in Romansh in between those in German. During the Second World War, SRG SSR filled an important function as a neutral, unbiased supplier of news, reaching far outside Switzerland's borders through shortwave transmissions. Radio Beromünster and Radio Monte Ceneri became known as the only free German and Italian-language radio stations in Europe.

In 1950, SRG SSR was one of 23 founding broadcasting organisations of the European Broadcasting Union. In 1939 television test transmissions started in Zürich. In 1953 regular TV transmissions started in German (from Zürich) – one hour per evening, five days a week. A year later, in 1954, French transmissions were broadcast from Geneva. For the Italian-speaking region, the programmes were re-transmitted with Italian subtitles until dedicated Italian studios were built in 1961.

In 1960, the company was renamed Schweizerische Radio- und Fernsehgesellschaft (and the equivalent names in the other languages - see above) to reflect the addition of television services. In 1965, the Federal Council allowed television advertising, as a means of keeping licence fees down. In 1966, the three main language communities were each given a second radio channel, in order to counter the effects of new commercial broadcasters outside the country, whose strong signals were reaching the Swiss population. In the same year, a dedicated Romansh broadcasting unit was created in Chur, using some of the new German-language second channel's broadcasting time. In 1968, colour television was introduced.

In 1978, the radio channels started stereo transmissions. In 1983, the Federal Council relaxed the Swiss media legislation to permit local private and commercial radio channels. SRG SSR countered this threat by launching its third set of channels, aimed at a younger audience. In 1991, SRG SSR underwent a wide-ranging restructuring. The enterprise organised itself as a private industry association, structured as a holding company under Swiss company law. The name, SRG SSR idée suisse, was introduced in 1999. In 1992, Radio Rumantsch was separated from the German-language radio broadcaster that had housed the Romansh broadcasting activities since 1938, and in 1995, the Romansh TV activities were moved over as well and the Romansh company renamed itself Radio e Televisiun Rumantscha.

In 1997, SRG SSR started digital broadcasts via the Hot Bird (13 degrees East) satellite, covering most of Europe. Since 2016, all channels have been broadcasting via satellite only in HD quality. All radio channels and SRF info are free-to-air. All other TV channels are encrypted due to copyright restrictions. Decryption cards are issued only to Swiss residents and Swiss citizens living abroad; the latter group must also pay a reduced television license fee to cover distribution costs.

On 3 June 2019, SRG SSR terminated digital terrestrial (DVB-T) broadcasts of all of its television channels due to the extremely low usage of digital terrestrial signals on television sets in Switzerland, which was part of a series of cost-saving measures partly brought about as a result of the 2018 "No Billag" popular initiative. The corporation estimated that 1.9% of the public used the DVB-T broadcasts, nearly all of which was for viewing on secondary devices. Television broadcasts remain available through cable, IPTV and DTH satellite. SRG SSR recommended DVB-T viewers switch to satellite.

SRG SSR shut down its FM transmission infrastructure on 31 December 2024. The corporation concluded that maintaining FM broadcasts along with DAB+ and Internet streaming was no longer cost-effective, as it found that due to widespread adoption of DAB+ the share of the public relying exclusively on FM was under ten percent and decreasing. This was to be followed by a general switch-off of FM broadcasting by 31 December 2026. After the switch-off, ratings researchers found instead that the SRG SSR stations that had been available on FM lost between 20 and 30 per cent of their audiences in most cases. In December 2025, the Swiss parliament decided to indefinitely postpone the full switch-off of FM owing to concerns from private broadcasters. SRG SSR plans to restart FM broadcasts in the fall of 2026.

== Organisation ==
SRG SSR is headquartered in Bern. It is governed by an Executive Board, appointed by a central council consisting of representatives of the four organisations.

Broadcasting is handled by five business units:

- Schweizer Radio und Fernsehen: handles German-speaking radio and television
- Radio télévision suisse: handles French-speaking radio and television
- Radiotelevisione svizzera di lingua italiana: handles Italian-speaking radio and television
- Radio Television Rumantscha: handles Romansh-speaking radio and television
- Swissinfo.ch: provides reporting on Swiss politics, business, science, culture and society for an international audience with an interest in Switzerland and handles the web portal swissinfo.ch
Schweizer Radio und Fernsehen

Radio télévision suisse

Radiotelevisione svizzera di lingua italiana

Radio Television Rumantscha

The corporation also has two subsidiary companies which produce, for example, the teletext pages.

It also operated HD suisse, its first high-definition television channel, with programming came from the four language networks of SRG SSR.

The television channels of SRG SSR are free to watch on the internet within Switzerland only due to broadcasting rights, except for its radio stations.

== Swissinfo ==
The former abbreviation SRI originally stood only for "Swiss Radio International", which was SRG SSR's international broadcasting arm (1935–2004), aimed at expatriates and others interested in Switzerland. In October 2004, SRI ceased broadcasting on shortwave and satellite, and instead concentrated its efforts on its multimedia internet platform SWI swissinfo, which now takes most of the resources. The Swissinfo website is produced in English, French, German, Italian, Spanish, Portuguese, Arabic, Chinese, Russian and Japanese.

== Swiss Satellite Radio ==
Swiss Satellite Radio (SSatR) is a radio company owned by SRG SSR that includes three stations: Radio Swiss Pop (pop music); Radio Swiss Jazz (jazz, soul and blues) and Radio Swiss Classic (classical music) all without interruptions. These stations have been on air since 1 September 1998.

Radio Swiss Pop logo (2018)

Radio Swiss Jazz logo (2018)

Radio Swiss Classic logo (2018)

== See also ==
- Television in Switzerland
