= 26 minutes =

26 minutes (television) and 120 secondes (radio) were both produced by the Radio télévision suisse.

26 minutes (26’) was a weekly French-language Swiss television comedy program starring Vincent Kucholl and Vincent Veillon. It was aired between 2015 and 2017 on RTS Un, succeeding their daily radio program 120 secondes (120’’) from 2011 to 2014 on Couleur 3 (Radio télévision suisse).

In 2017, 26 minutes was also broadcast with German subtitles on SRF zwei.

Since August 2018, Vincent Kucholl and Vincent Veillon revived the series with a monthly 120 minutes on RTS Un and a weekly 120 secondes on La Première. In 2020, it was adapted further into 52 minutes.

Broadcast Timeline
Years	Programme	Broadcasting
2011-2014	120 secondes	Daily, Couleur 3
2015-2017	26 minutes	Weekly, RTS Un
2018-2020	120 minutes	Monthly, RTS Un
Since 2018	120 secondes	Weekly, La Première
Since 2020	52 minutes	Bimonthly, RTS Un

== Cast ==
Vincent Kucholl, born in 1975, studied political science at the University of Lausanne and is the director of the book collection "Comprendre" from the publication Éditions loisirs et pédagogie^{[fr]}(Leisure and Education).

Vincent Veillon, born in 1986, studied new media at the École cantonale d'art de Lausanne. He is the son of Pierre-François Veillon, who was a member of the Grand Council of Vaud, the Council of State of Vaud, and the National Council of Switzerland.

== 120 secondes ==
The format of 120 secondes is an interview of a fake personality played by Vincent Kucholl, by Vincent Veillon, who is portraying a journalist. It was broadcast daily at 7:50 AM on Couleur 3 and then available on YouTube and Dailymotion; each video produced was viewed about 60,000 times with peaks at 80,000 for burning questions.

After their success on the radio, Vincent Kucholl and Vincent Veillon developed and presented a theatre show called "120’’ présente la Suisse" in 2013-2014. They had 145 performances throughout French-speaking Switzerland. The show is inspired by the radio programme and by the collection "LEP Référence" that Vincent Kucholl was directing for the Éditions Loisirs et pédagogie.

== 26 minutes ==
Following the previous radio program, the television program 26 minutes ran from 2015 to 2017. It was filmed on Fridays in a Lausanne nightclub (Chauderon 18) and was broadcast on Saturdays at 8:10 PM on RTS Un and on Sundays at 8:00 PM on RTS Deux. In 2015, Vincent Kucholl and Vincent Veillon were also invited to perform at the Paléo Festival.

The hundredth and last episode was broadcast on 16 December 2017.

== See also ==
- Juice Rap News, in Australia
- Les Guignols, in France
