= Radio Suisse Romande =

Radio Télévision Suisse
- Type: Broadcast, radio, and online
- Country: Switzerland
- Founded: 1922; 104 years ago
- Radio stations: La 1ère; Espace 2; Couleur 3; Option Musique
- Headquarters: Lausanne
- Parent: SRG SSR
- Dissolved: 28 February 2010; 16 years ago
- Official website: www.rts.ch/audio-podcast/
- Language: Swiss French
- Replaced by: Radio Télévision Suisse (RTS)

RSR's former logo

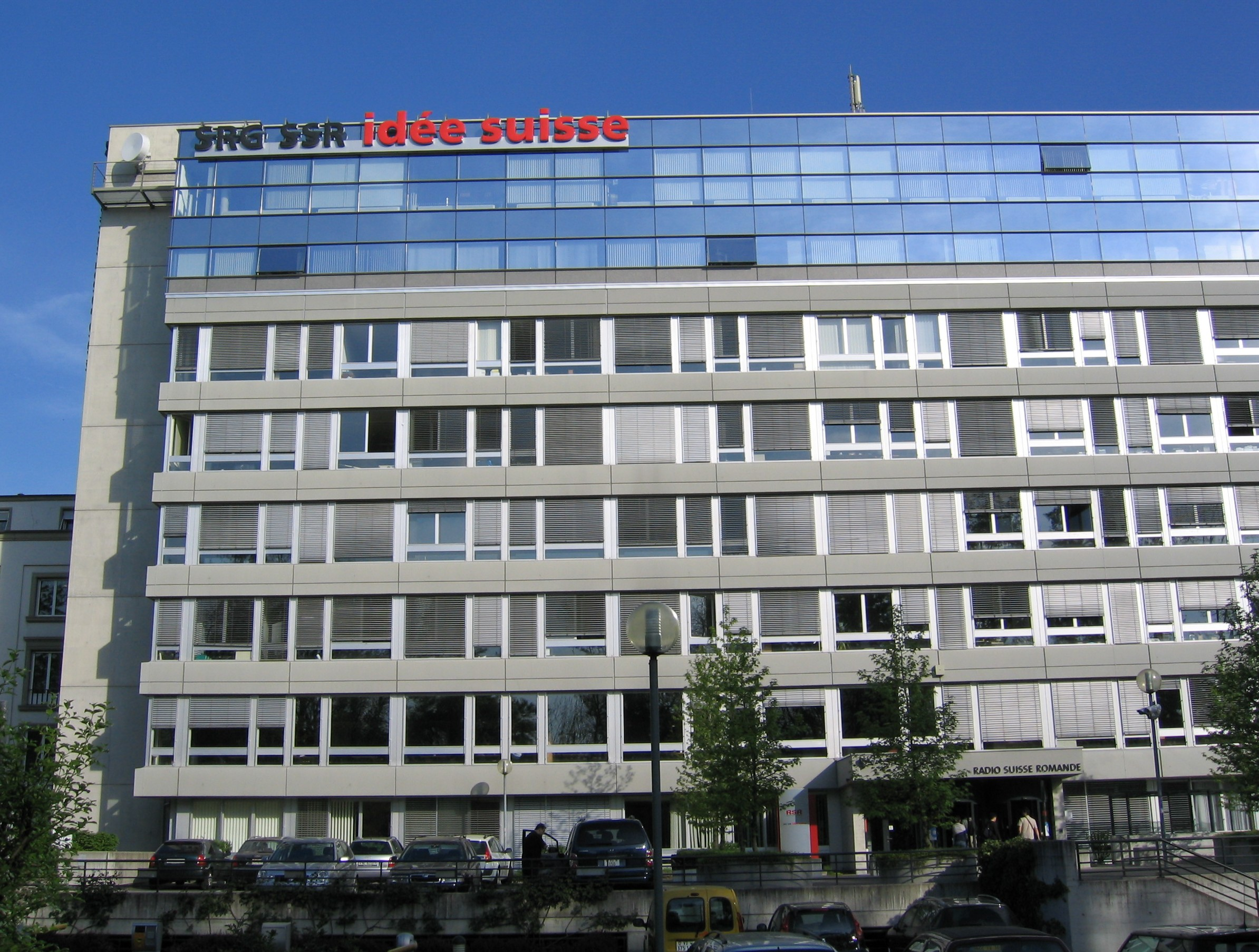
RSR headquarters in Lausanne.

The Radio Suisse Romande (RSR) was an enterprise unit within public-broadcasting corporation SRG SSR. It was responsible for the production and transmission of French-language radio programmes in Switzerland. RSR's headquarters were situated in Lausanne. Radio Suisse Romande and Télévision Suisse Romande merged in January 2010 to create Radio Télévision Suisse.

== Broadcasting ==
RSR broadcasts on four radio channels:

- La 1ère – news, talk, and general programming
- Espace 2 – culture and classical music
- Couleur 3 – youth-oriented programming
- Option Musique – music ("the hits of yesterday and today")

These channels are broadcast on FM as well as via Digital Audio Broadcasting and satellite (DVB-S). Up until 5 December 2010, Option Musique was also available on AM at 765 kHz from the Sottens transmitter.
