= RTS Info =

- Country: Switzerland

Programming
- Language: French

Ownership
- Owner: Radio Télévision Suisse (RTS)
- Sister channels: RTS 1, RTS 2

History
- Launched: 26 December 2006
- Former names: TSR Info (2006–2012)

Links
- Website: Official site

RTS Info refers to the news platforms (radio, TV and on-line) of the Radio Télévision Suisse (French-language branch of the Swiss Broadcasting Corporation and is also the name of its virtual television channel launched on 26 December 2006.

It broadcasts 24 hours a day using an Internet stream, and simulcasts regularly (especially at night and in the early morning) on RTS 2. Contents of the channel are provided by the RTS editorial and SWISS TXT.

== Logos and identities ==
tsrinfo logo from 2006 to 2012

RTS Info first logo from 2012 to 2019

RTS Info second logo from 2019 to 21 August 2023.

== Programmes ==
- Videos of the beak down news
- Rediffusion of the RTS news bulletin of 12.45 PM, 6.55 PM and 7.30 PM
- Swiss weather forecast
- Press review of Swiss French journals
- Textual news bulletin
