= RFJ =

RFJ may refer to:

- Radio fréquence Jura, Swiss radio broadcaster
- Relatives for Justice
- Rewards for Justice
