= Larissa Bieler =

Swiss journalist

- Born: Larissa Margot Bieler; 27 October 1978 (age 47); Chur, Switzerland
- Occupation: Journalist

Larissa Margot Bieler (born 27 October 1978) is a Swiss journalist. She is the director, and was previously also the editor-in-chief of, digital media platform Swissinfo. She is a member of the Swiss Federal Media Commission, and president of the Quality in Journalism Association.

== Biography ==
Bieler is from Bonaduz in Graubünden, and was born in 1978. Bieler studied German, economics and politics at the University of Zurich, graduating in 2007. She worked first as a lecturer and assistant in linguistics in the Department of German Studies at the university, and at the French National Centre for Scientific Research in Paris.

Before and after studying in Paris and Mannheim, she worked for many years as a freelance journalist for the Bündner Tagblatt and various Bündner Medien. By July 2013, she was editor-in-chief of the Bündner Tagblatt. Bieler has been editor-in-chief of SWI swissinfo.ch since January 2016. SWI swissinfo.ch is SRG's digital platform aimed at an international audience, which operates in ten languages, and covers news on politics, business, culture, society and science. In addition, Bieler was appointed director of SWI swissinfo.ch in autumn 2018. From 2018 until July 2022, she held the dual roles of director and editor, but then gave up her role of editor-in-chief.

Bieler has been President of the Quality in Journalism Association since 2017, following on from Philipp Cueni, and is a member of the Board of Directors of SWISS TXT. Bieler was appointed as a member of Eidg. Medienkommission (EMEK), the Federal Media Commission, in February 2022.
