= Marcelot =

Brazilian artist

Marcelot (born Marcelo Tomaz Galvão de Castro; in 1965, in Potim/Guaratinguetá, Brazil) is a Swiss-Brazilian visual artist. His works use a wide variety of techniques, like painting (oil, acrylic, water-colour), drawing, photography, and sculpture (pottery; paper/fabrics).

He grew up in his homeland and moved to Europe in 1990. After studying in Germany, he moved to Switzerland, where he lives and works today.

He is most known for his projects about the Greek heritage, environment and religious phenomenons. Marcelot’s art mainly explores the “pre-ideas” of objects and their symbolic values.

== Early life and studies ==
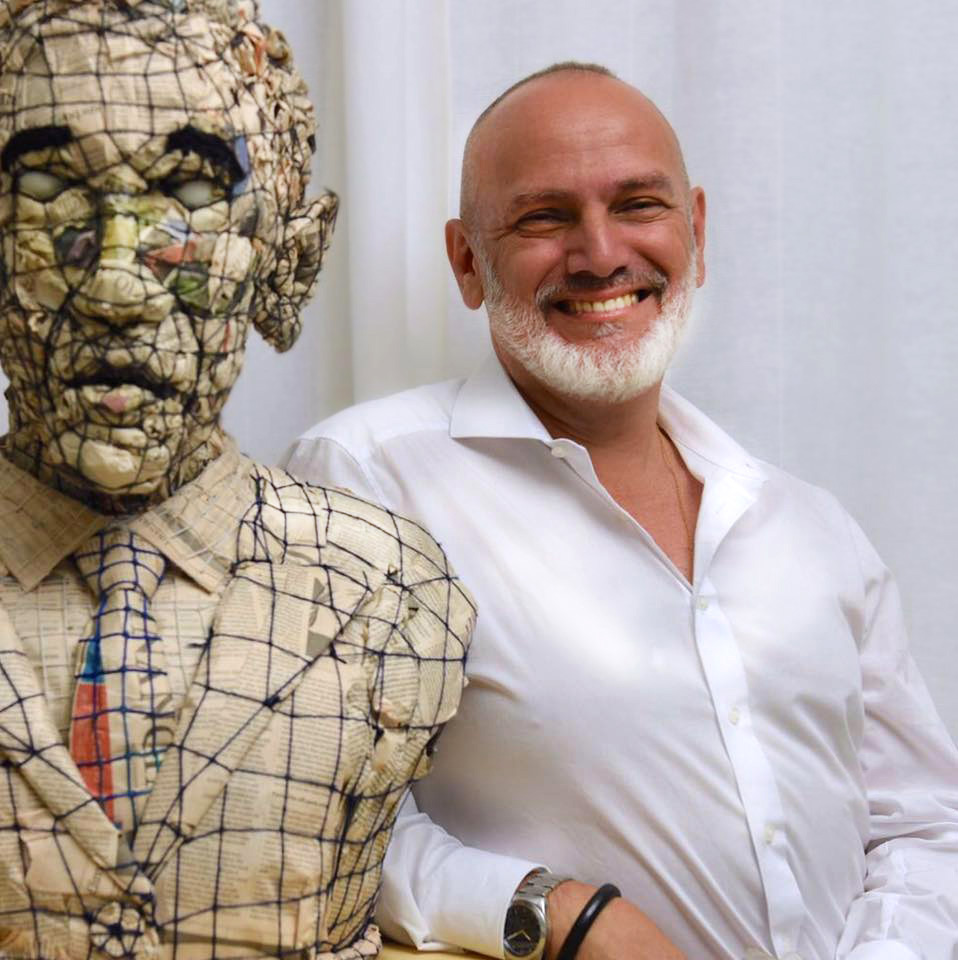
Artist Marcelot showcasing his Obama bust forming part of his "Antike von Heute" series

Marcelot completed his schooling and high school diploma in Potim. He studied art education at FAMUSC, later renamed Faculdade Santa Cecilia, (FASC), in Pindamonhangaba (1987-1989), with a focus on theatre, and worked as an art teacher.

In 1990 he relocated to Europe, to Munich in Germany, where he studied art at the Academy of Fine Arts, Munich (1991-1997). In Munich, he developed his artistic identity.

After studying art, he studied art therapy (post-graduate) at the same institute (1997-1999).

After completing his studies, Marcelot became an art therapist in a psychiatric hospital in Münsterlingen, Switzerland (2002), where he used art to help patients communicate their feelings. Marcelot has also trained as a group analyst in the Seminar for Group Analysis Zürich (SGAZ, 2003-2007).

Since 2009, Marcelot has become active as a freelance artist finding a new path to art.

== Fine arts and sculpture ==
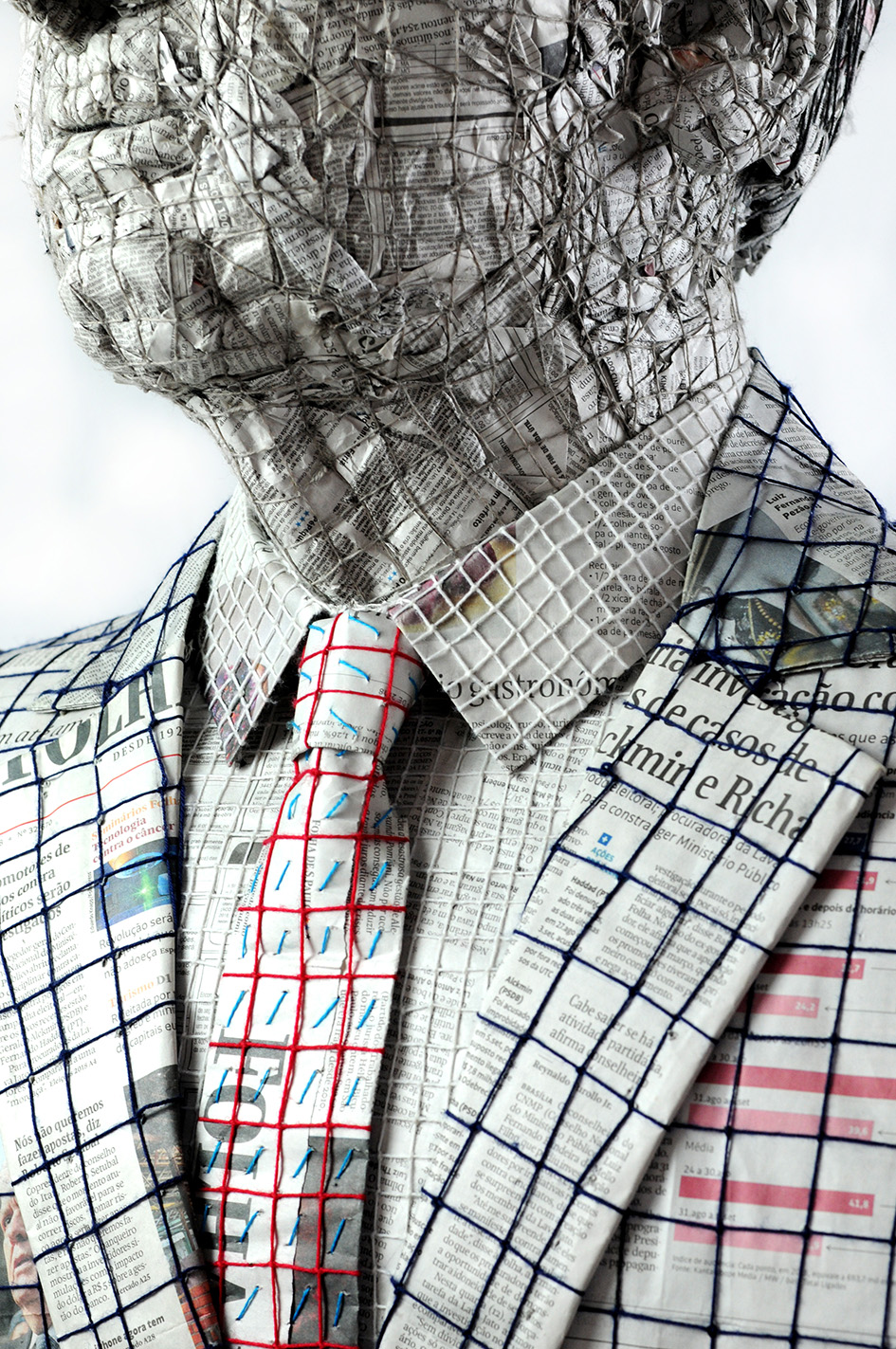
Artist Marcelot's Bolsonaro Bust

=== Early works ===
The set of photographs entitled "Nudes" (1994) was Marcelo's first exhibition. The pictures were created together with the student union of the catholic church in Munich. His exhibition "Once Upon A Time There Was A Street" (1995), which was shown in different cities in Germany, was a photo report with a series of black and white photographs which represents the childhood of street children in Brazil. His oil paintings series titled “Eros of Things” (2014) was the first art project after Marcelot reemerged as an artist.

=== Antike von Heute ===
In 2017 the artist decided to realize the concept of his project about Greek heritage. The project “Ancient of Today” was designed with a museum of Greek-Roman art in mind and includes twelve “interventions” where he shows how modern and present this cultural heritage is today. Initial interventions focused on exploring the needs of people in modern times by drawing parallels between contemporary humans and, for example, the hedonism bestowed on the Greek gods.

A big part of the project is the series "Olymp" in which he sculpted paper objects and costumes that enable normal people to act as Greek gods. Newspaper is used as the main medium for the sculptures in this project, representing the information age in which people currently live.

==== Heads of Power ====
Every art collection of a museum for Greek-Roman Art has busts of Roman emperors. Making a parallel to them, the intervention “Heads of Power” references powerful politicians of today, whose busts are constructed out of newspapers from their countries. Marcelot has stated in an interview that the intention is to make the explicit link between how today’s politicians rely on information (as represented through the sculpting medium of newspaper) to consolidate their power.

In 2018, Marcelot started participating in artistic residencies. His first residency was at the Fundação Armando Alvares Penteado (FAAP) in São Paulo, Brazil. His project was making a bust of the new Brazilian president. His statement is “in my art I am political but not partisan”. The bust depicting the newly elected Brazilian president Jair Bolsonaro, was a great success and made the cover of the Brazilian magazine Época's January 2019 edition. The cover was accompanied by a 4-page article about him and his work. The biggest newspaper in Switzerland Tages-Anzeiger devoted a full page to him and his bust and Swissinfo has also interviewed Marcelot about his work.

Among other political leaders he included the ex-Chancellor of Germany Angela Merkel, whose bust he made during his third art residency in Berlin in 2020.

His second residency took place in Shanghai, China, in December 2019 (Swatch Art Peace Hotel), where he was invited by Swatch. Due to the outbreak of the COVID-19 pandemic, this residency unfortunately came to an early end. Nevertheless, during the short time he was able to create a Chinese dragon from Chinese newspapers, again connecting tradition and present times.

Two years later, he was again invited by the Swatch Art Peace Hotel to take part at the 59th Biennale of Venice in 2022. For this international art event, he created a juxtaposition between the lion of Venice, the symbol of the city, and a bust of emperor Napoleon, who destroyed the republic of Venice in 1797. While the Napoleon belongs to the intervention "Heads of Power", the lion is a newly created sculpture made of newspaper and precious Venetian Rubelli fabrics.

=== Other projects ===
In his project “Graphic Body - Series Consumer”, through the artistic means of expression of photography and painting among other things, Marcelot aims to treat the predatory attitude of the dominant consumer society, which sees nature only as a source of profit and reduces its elements to consumer goods in some form. The project explores themes of environmentalism, consumerism and the tension between modern Brazilian society and the cultures of indigenous Brazilian. An exhibition of the initial stages of the project took place in Zurich, Switzerland (June 2022).

Marcelot comes from a religious background. For a long time, he has had the wish to realize a project about his experiences in this domain of sacred world, religion and faith. The idea developed in different phases and expressions during the years. Finally, he conceived the idea to set up a “Chapel”, making out of a warehouse or a gallery room a mystical place. Making a chapel means for the artist making an homage to his personal story and where he comes from.
