= Swiss Digital Initiative =

Swiss non-profit foundation

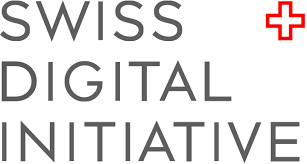
- Formation: 2019; 7 years ago
- Headquarters: Geneva
- Board Chair: Doris Leuthard
- Website: https://www.swiss-digital-initiative.org

The Swiss Digital Initiative (SDI) is a Swiss non-profit foundation based in Geneva that promotes ethical standards in the digital world. Established under the patronage of former Federal Councillors Ueli Maurer and Doris Leuthard, the SDI brings together stakeholders from government, business, academia and civil society to address challenges related to digital trust. Its first major project is the Digital Trust Label, launched to certify the trustworthiness of digital services based on criteria such as security, data protection, reliability and fair user interaction.

== History and mission ==
Initiated by digitalswitzerland the first Swiss Global Digital Summit took place in Geneva in September 2019 to provide a platform to promote in-depth discussions on "Ethics and Fairness in the Age of Digital Transformation". The Summit also represented the starting point of the "Swiss Digital Initiative" (SDI).

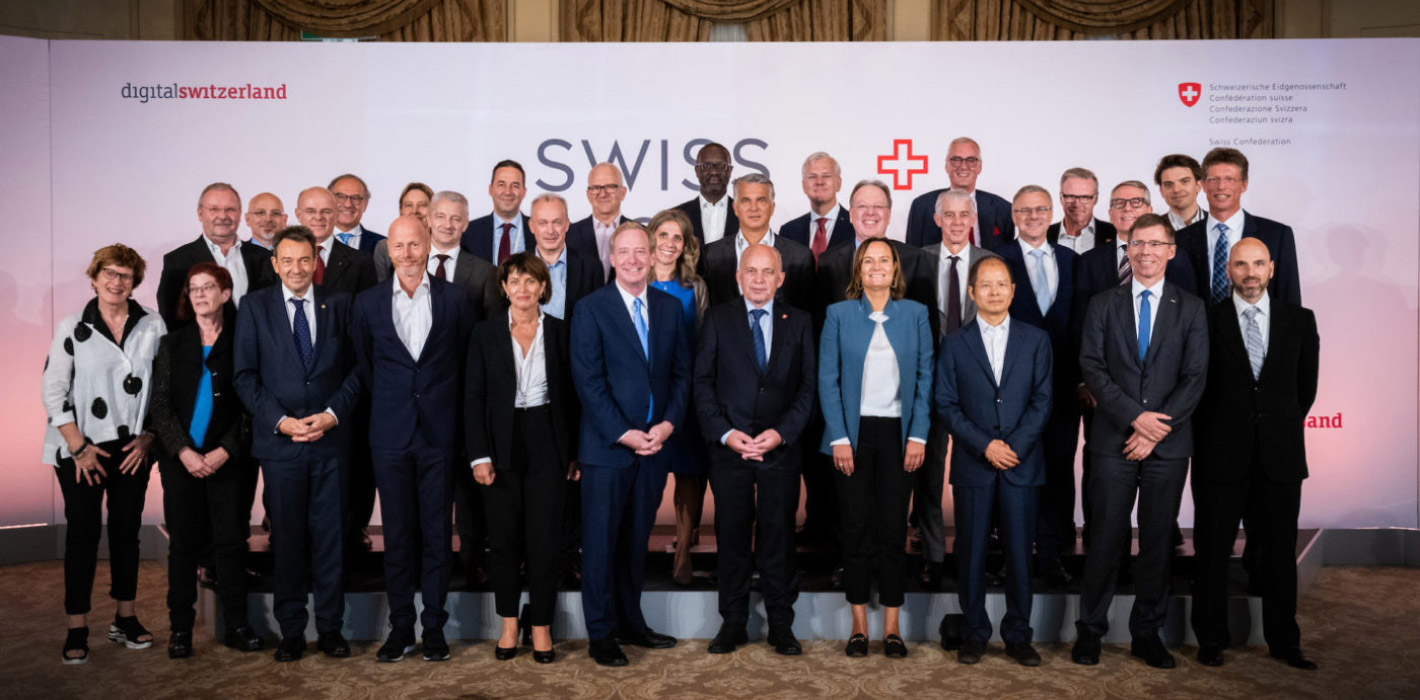
Participants at the Global Digital Summit

The SDI defines itself as a long-term, process to safeguard ethical standards in the digital world through concrete projects. It brings together academia, government, civil society and business to find solutions to strengthen trust in digital technologies and in the actors involved in ongoing digital transformation.

In 2022, the SDI announced at the World Economic Forum that the Digital Trust Label was expanding beyond Switzerland, with organizations from other countries joining the certification process.

== Digital trust label ==
The Swiss Digital Initiative's first major project is the Digital Trust Label, intended to certify the trustworthiness of digital applications. The certification criteria were developed under the leadership of EPFL and a dedicated Label Expert Committee, and refined through public consultation to ensure transparency and accountability. According to the Swiss Federal Department of Finance, the label evaluates services across four areas: security, data protection, reliability, and fair user interaction, including use of artificial intelligence. To be certified, applications must meet 35 defined criteria. The initiative seeks to promote transparency for users and encourage ethical standards among digital service providers.

According to Swissinfo, the Digital Trust Label is intended to strengthen user confidence by offering clear information about how digital services function and by promoting adherence to ethical values. The director of the Swiss Digital Initiative stated that ethical and responsible behavior should serve as a competitive advantage for businesses.

Experts noted the importance of establishing clear and effective certification criteria. According to a 2020 article by Swissinfo, compliance with the label's standards would be verified by an external independent body, such as SGS Société Générale de Surveillance.

Benedikt Wechsler, Ambassador and Head of Digitalisation at the Federal Department of Foreign Affairs, described Geneva as a natural setting for piloting tools for digital trust and convening international stakeholders to build global consensus.
