= Francisca Urio =

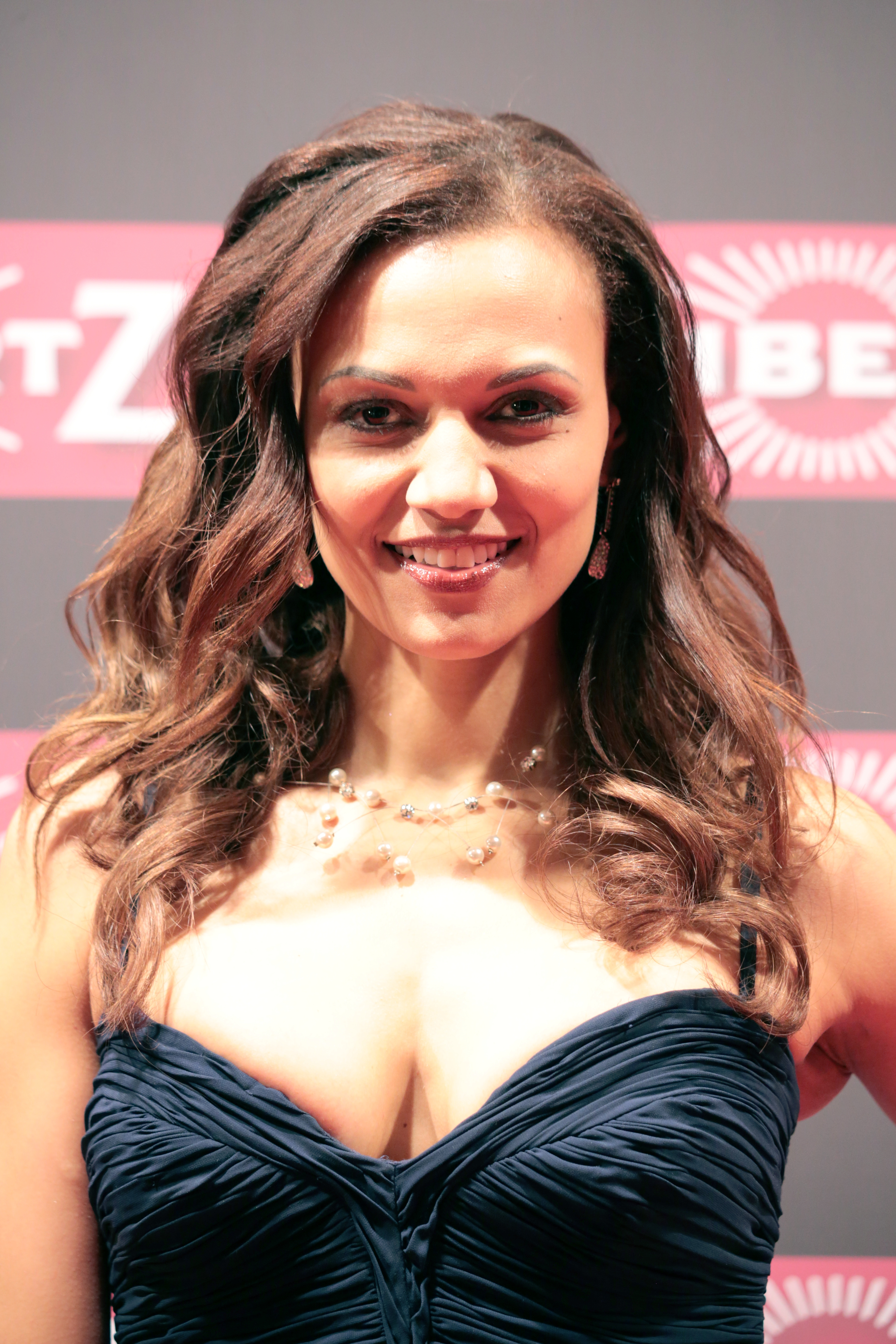
- Urio in 2018

Background information
- Born: February 6, 1981 (age 44)
- Origin: Meiningen, Thuringia, East Germany
- Genres: Rhythm and blues, Soul
- Occupation(s): Singer-songwriter, radio presenter, model
- Years active: 1996–present
- Website: www.francisca-urio.de

Francisca Urio (born February 6, 1981, in Meiningen, Thuringia, East Germany) is a German singer-songwriter and radio presenter of Afro-German heritage who lives in Berlin.

== Personal life ==
Francisca Urio was born in Meiningen, a town in southern Thuringia but grew up in Berlin as the only child of her German mother Monica and her father Geoffrey from Tanzania, both architects who met while studying in Dresden. Her father's RnB, Soul and Pop music collection influenced her music taste from an early age. Her first stage experience was at pre-school age as an extra in a Porgy and Bess performance at the Berlin Theater des Westens. She attended the Fläming-Grundschule in 12159 Berlin-Friedenau and the Paul-Natorp-Gymnasium in 12161 Berlin. After finishing school with the Abitur in 2000 she decided to pursue her singing career full-time.

She is engaged to socially deprived children and was patroness of the network Take-My-Hand e.V.

== Music career ==
=== Silvashado band ===
In 1996, Francisca Urio founded together with Priscilla Harris, N'gone Thiam and Boussa Thiam the band Silvashado in Berlin. They performed regularly in clubs in Berlin and at festivals in Germany, Austria and Switzerland. In 2002, the band took part at a performance in Dresden in front of the Sempera Opera House for eighty-thousand helpers in the 2002 100-year flood. The band toured and performed with singers like O-Town, Mary J. Blige, Ben, Seal, Mousse T., Shakira, and Wyclef Jean and featured on concert DVDs with Ben and Seal (One Night to Remember, recorded live in Düsseldorf). After first Boussa and later N'gone Thiam left the band, Urio and Harris continued as duo until their last concert in October 2006 when they started to concentrate on their solo careers.

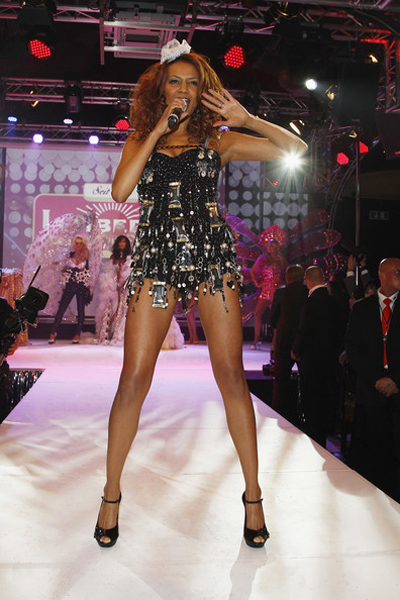
Urio performing 2012 in Cologne

=== Deutschland sucht den Superstar ===
Francisca Urio gained national recognition as contestant and 'Top 10' finalist in the 2007 German "Idol" version Deutschland sucht den Superstar (DSDS) broadcast by RTL. She was considered a unique talent, having the best voice and being the favorite in this competition, not only by the jury but also gaining acclamation by professional singers like the bass-baritone Thomas Quasthoff.

On February 6, 2007, the German newspaper Bild appeared with an article accusing Francisca Urio and her friend Priscilla Harris (who was also a contestant at the casting show) to be professional singers, having already recorded CDs and are therefore not entitled to take part in the competition. However the accusations where quickly dismissed as the rules of the DSDS show only prohibit participants to have a current recording contract but not to have previous professional experience.

Despite the praise her performances received from the jury Francisca Urio was unexpectedly eliminated in the 4th motto show, which equally surprised the jury, the other candidates and the viewers. However, in an online voting with over hundred thousand votes organized by the newspaper Bild after the casting show was finished, Francisca Urio won the voting by a small margin ahead of the DSDS winner Mark Medlock.

=== Solo career ===
In 2006, Francisca Urio toured through Germany with the musical show The Magic Night of Dancing Musicals in which she presented 5 songs as solo singer. Since 2003, she was a presenter at the Berlin radio station Jazz Radio.

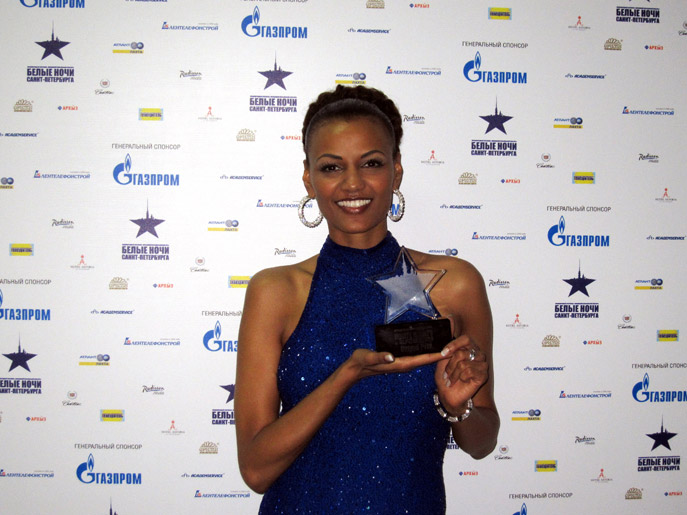
Urio 2011 in St. Petersburg

The radio station Spreeradio 105.5 arranged for Francisca Urio to perform and record with the Filmorchester Babelsberg in May 2007.

Urio was invited to take part on May 22 and 23, 2007 in the semi-finals of the International Competition Of Young Singers of Popular Music "New Wave 2007" in Moscow and qualified for the finals which took place in Jūrmala, Latvia from July 25 to 30, 2007. She reached the 5th place in the competition.

On July 7, 2007, Urio sung the American national anthem before the fight between IBF/IBO heavyweight champion Wladimir Klitschko and challenger Lamon Brewster in Cologne in front of an audience of 19500 spectators and millions of television viewers.

In 2008, she started recording her debut album with producer Dieter Falk. The album called Alpha Girl was released on June 10, 2011.

In February 2010 she was the show-act at the Rosenball charity-event in Munich for the Tabaluga children foundation.

At the festival White Nights of St.Petersburg she won the prize for 'Best Newcomer 2011' for her album Alpha Girl.

== Discography ==
=== Album ===
- 2011 Alpha Girl (Nji-Music)

=== Singles ===
- 2001 Silvashado: Die Reise durch mein ich (Sony Music Entertainment/BERLIN RECORDS)
- 2010 It's a woman's world (NJI Media)
- 2010 Baila Commigo (NJI Media)
- 2011 We Are One (Nji-Music)
- 2011 Stomp your Feet (Nji-Music)

=== Sampler ===
- 2007 Power of Love (joined release of all finale participants of Deutschland sucht den Superstar)
  - If I Ain't Got You
  - If You Don't Know Me By Now (Francisca Urio and the DSDS-Top-10)

== DVD appearances ==
- 2003 Ben Hörproben Live
- 2005 Seal One Night to Remember
