= VHR =

VHR may refer to:

- Victorian Heritage Register, in the State of Victoria, Australia
- Radio VHR, in the List of German-language radio stations
- Very-high-resolution, imagery of the Pleiades Earth-imaging satellites
- V. Hanumantha Rao, political leader from the Indian National Congress
