= Radio RTR =

Romansh radio station in Switzerland

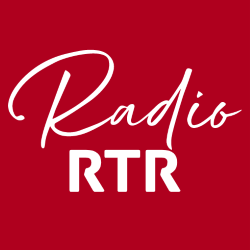
- Switzerland
- Frequency: DAB

Ownership
- Owner: RTR

History
- First air date: 11 September 1924

Links
- Website: www.rtr.ch/radio

Radio RTR, formerly known as Radio Rumantsch, is the Swiss public radio station in the Romansh language for Rhaeto-Romance Switzerland. It began its first broadcast in Romansh in 1924, but was only created in 1954.

== History ==
On 11 September 1924, the first radio programme in Romansh was broadcast under the responsibility of Felix Huonder (1886-1960). From 1943, the first regular broadcasts in Romansh are broadcast every Friday of the month.

Radio Rumantsch was created in 1954 when its first radio broadcasts for the canton of Grisons began. Las Cristallas, the 'radioscola' in Romansh (readings of texts in Romansh on the radio to learn the language), was broadcast for the first time on 27 January 1955 to celebrate the 17th anniversary of the vote in 1938 making Romansh the fourth national language of Switzerland.

Following the reorganization of the SRG in 1991, Radio Rumantsch became an autonomous enterprise unit. It was joined in 1995 by Televisiun Rumantscha, which has just separated from Schweizer Fernsehen DRS, to form Radio e Televisiun Rumantscha. The radio station's headquarters is in Chur.
