= Darius Rochebin =

French-speaking Swiss journalist (born 1966)

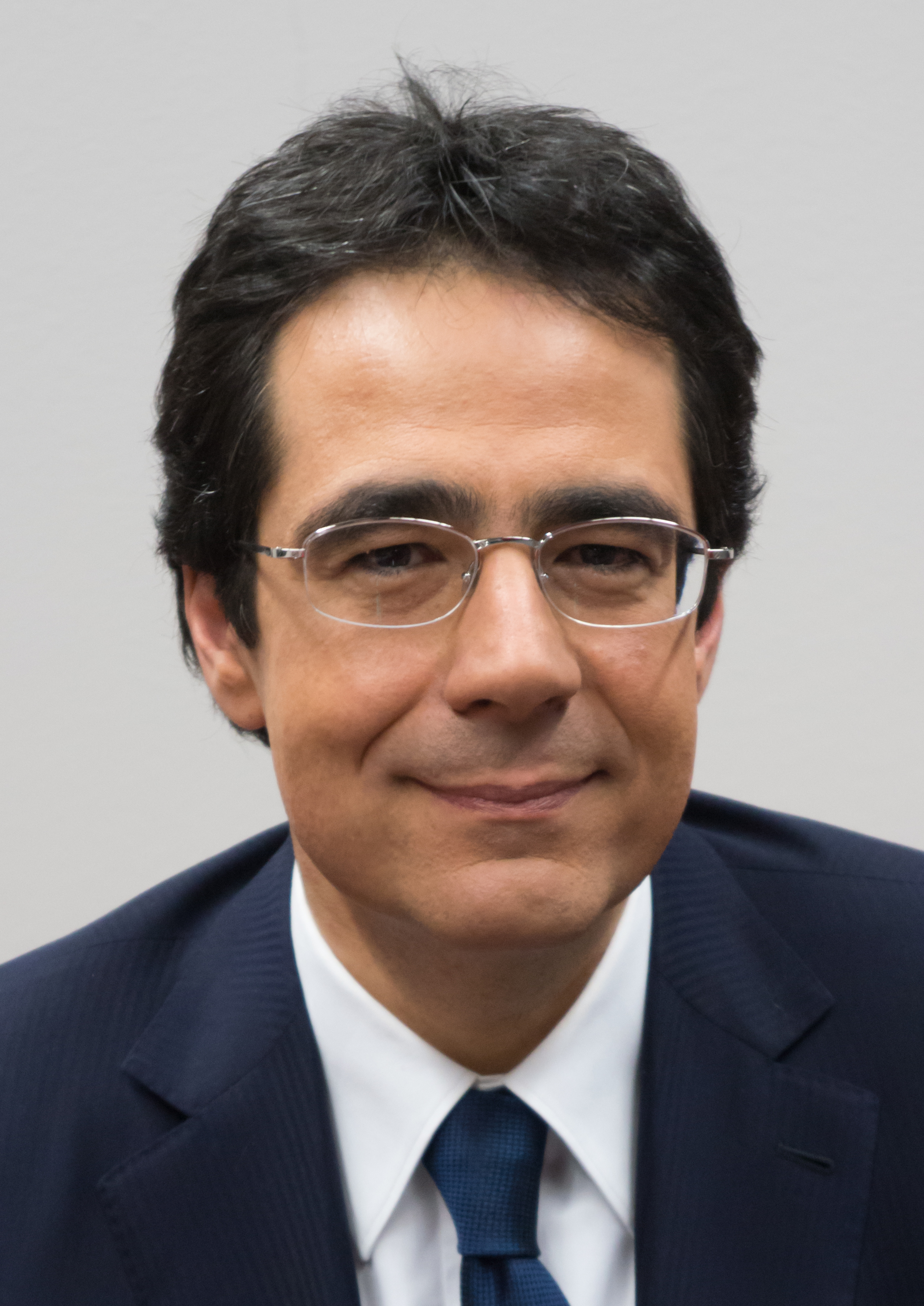
- Rochebin in 2013
- Born: Darius Noël Khoshbin; 25 December 1966 (age 59); Geneva, Switzerland
- Education: University of Geneva
- Career
- Stations: RTS, LCI
- Country: Switzerland, France

Darius Rochebin (French pronunciation: [daʁjys ʀɔʃ(ə)bɛ̃]; born Khoshbin, 25 December 1966) is a Swiss journalist currently active in France. From 1998 to 2020, he presented the newscast of the Swiss public broadcaster Radio Télévision Suisse (RTS) as well as the RTS programme Pardonnez-moi, for which he interviewed Swiss and international personalities. In August 2020, he left RTS and joined the French channel LCI to host a daily evening show with interviews.

== Biography ==
Darius Noël Khoshbin is the son of Alishah Khoshbin (1917–1994), a pharmacist born in Iran and a Baháʼí, and Irène Mailler (1940–2008), born in Switzerland. He francized his name to Rochebin at the age of twenty.

After studying French literature at the University of Geneva, he worked as a journalist for the Journal de Genève (1987), then for the magazine L'Illustré, before joining Television Suisse Romande in 1995. He presented his first television news, TJ-Nuit, in 1996, then the weekend edition in 1997.

From 1998, he was the star presenter of the French-speaking Swiss national news program at 7:30 p.m., received by 257 million households around the world thanks to its coverage on TV5 Monde. As of 2008, the man that the newspaper Le Matin nicknamed the "Pope of the TJ" is the sole host for the television news on RTS. That same year, tragically, his mother Irène committed suicide.

At the same time, he ran an interview program called Pardonnez-moi, where he received a topical personality every Sunday. His interviewees included Vladimir Putin, François Hollande, Hassan Rouhani, Kofi Annan, Albert of Monaco, Dilma Rousseff, Emmanuel Macron, the 14th Dalai Lama, Klaus Schwab, Sepp Blatter, Julian Assange, Edward Snowden, Roman Polanski, Manuel Valls, Aung San Suu Kyi, Mikhail Gorbachev, Laurent Fabius, Bernadette Chirac, Christine Lagarde, Serge Klarsfeld, Johnny Hallyday, Alain Delon, Gérard Depardieu, Monica Bellucci, Arnold Schwarzenegger, Jean d'Ormesson, and Sylvain Tesson.

In 2011, he was made knight of the French Order of Arts and Letters.

In August 2019, Rochebin began his retirement and handed off duties to junior colleagues.

In July 2020, he announced that he was leaving RTS on 2 August after 25 years of collaboration to join the TF1 group.

Since 24 August 2020 he has hosted a daily interview program, Monday to Thursday, Le 20.00 de Darius Rochebin on the LCI channel. At the end of October 2020, he was temporarily replaced by Elizabeth Martichoux following accusations of sexual harassment.

The Magazine Politico has placed Darius Rochebin among the top 40 influencers in France in 2026.

=== Sexual harassment allegations ===
In October 2020, the Swiss daily Le Temps published an investigation containing several testimonies from people claiming to have been sexually harassed, or to have been the subject of an unwanted report, by the journalist at the time of his employment at RTS. The newspaper also reported conversations with minors revolving around sexuality under the cover of false profiles on social networks. Darius Rochebin "firmly denies having engaged in criminally reprehensible acts" and filed a complaint against Le Temps for defamation in December 2020. La Liberté spoke of "Dariusgate". Five hundred and fifty RTS employees signed an open letter to their management in which they stressed their surprise that, in a message addressed to the newspaper's teams, the latter only mentioned the case of Rochebin, while two other men were also mentioned in the report.
