= Schweizer Radio und Fernsehen =

Swiss public radio and TV broadcaster

- Type: Broadcast, radio, television and online
- Country: Switzerland
- Availability: Switzerland, online
- TV stations: SRF1; SRF zwei; SRF info
- Radio stations: SRF 1; SRF 2 Kultur; SRF 3; SRF 4 News; SRF Musikwelle; SRF Virus
- Headquarters: Zurich
- Broadcast area: Switzerland; Germany; Austria; Liechtenstein
- Parent: SRG SSR
- Key people: Nathalie Wappler
- Launch date: 1 January 2011; 15 years ago
- Official website: www.srf.ch
- Replaced: Schweizer Fernsehen (SF) (television); Schweizer Radio DRS (SR DRS) (radio)

Schweizer Radio und Fernsehen (transl. Swiss Radio and Television), shortened to SRF, is a subsidiary of the Swiss Broadcasting Corporation (SRG SSR), operating in German-speaking Switzerland.

SRF was created on 1 January 2011 through the merger of radio company Schweizer Radio DRS (SR DRS) and television company Schweizer Fernsehen (SF), becoming the largest electronic media house of German-speaking Switzerland. About 2,150 employees work for SRF in the three main studios in Basel, Bern, and Zurich.

== History ==
The public company Swiss Radio and Television was created on 1 January 2011 through the merger of the formerly independent companies Swiss Radio DRS and Swiss Television (SF). Since 16 December 2012, the television and radio stations have been operating as SRF; the names SF and SR DRS have been gradually abolished.

In February 2025, the SRF announced that, due to cost-cutting measures, the summer breaks for individual programs would be extended and more repeats would be broadcast at times of low usage. Individual programs, including G&G – Gesichter und Geschichten (Faces and Stories), will be canceled. On the radio, programs such as Kontext or the Wissenschaftsmagazin (science magazine) will be affected. More than two hours of live presentations will also be canceled on Radio SRF 4 News in the morning. In addition, production of the Swiss Comedy Awards will be discontinued. These measures will be implemented gradually from now until the beginning of 2026.

== Journalism ==
SRF operates a worldwide network of correspondents for radio, television and online. Over 40 journalists work for SRF worldwide.

As a joint facility, SRF operates the Bundeshaus studio in Bern. Around 35 Bundeshaus correspondents from the Swiss broadcasters RSI, RTS, RTR, SRF and SWI report from there on political events in the capital Bern.

== Programmes ==
=== Radio ===
- FM, DAB and online:
  - Radio SRF 1 – general programming
  - Radio SRF 2 Kultur – cultural, intellectual programming, classical and jazz music
  - Radio SRF 3 – youth programming
- DAB and online:
  - Radio SRF 4 News – news, documentaries
  - Radio SRF Musikwelle – pop music, chansons, folk music and schlager
  - Radio SRF Virus – alternative music to Radio SRF 3
- Online-only:
  - Radio Swiss Jazz – non-stop Jazz programming
  - Radio Swiss Pop – non-stop pop music

=== Television ===
- SRF 1
- SRF zwei
- SRF info

== Broadcasting ==
=== Radio ===
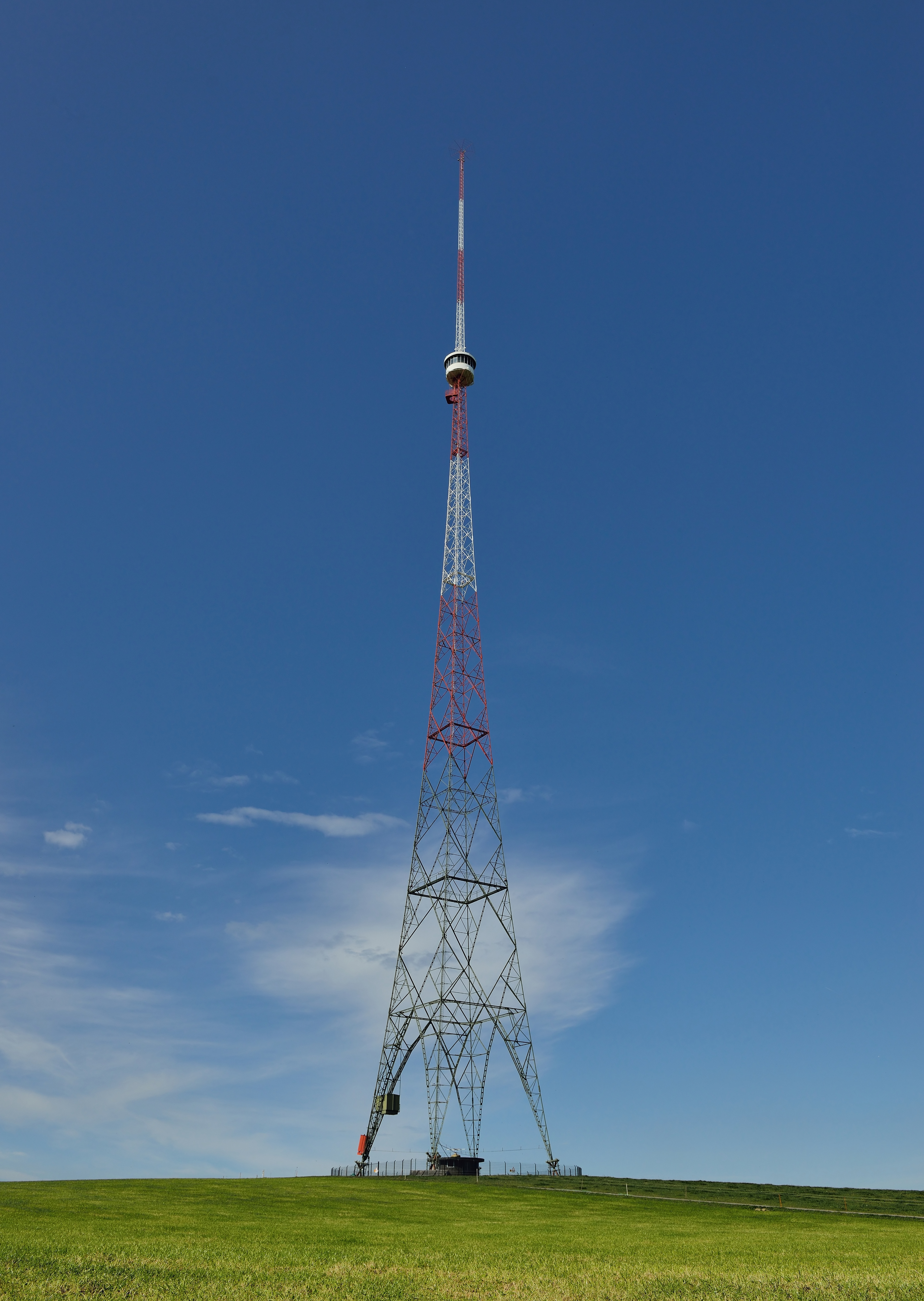
The Beromünster tower in 2015

Among the radio programmes, Radio SRF Musikwelle has the longest history, as it was originally the flagship frequency on the medium wave frequency 529 kHz, broadcasting news from its central antenna near Beromünster. "Radio Beromünster" was, during World War II, together with the British BBC, one of the few independent radio programmes that could be received in large parts of Western Europe. Jean Rudolf von Salis, a Swiss historian, commented in his weekly "Weltchronik" ("world chronicle") on the development of the war and other international events.

With the introduction of VHF radio in the 1960s, the service on 529 kHz was transformed into the "Musikwelle" music service. The Geneva Frequency Plan of 1975 mandated the frequency shift to 531 kHz. In 2008, the Beromünster antenna was deactivated.

== See also ==
- Television in Switzerland
- Plainpalais
