= RSI Rete Due =

Swiss Italian-language radio station

- Switzerland
- Broadcast area: Switzerland: DAB, TV, Internet radio

Programming
- Language: Italian

Ownership
- Owner: RSI

History
- First air date: 1985

Links
- Webcast: ,
- Website: retedue.rsi.ch/home/networks/retedue.html

RSI Rete Due is the second Italian-language radio station from Radiotelevisione svizzera di lingua italiana (RSI). It was launched in 1985.

Its headquarters are at the RSI-building in Lugano-Besso, reaching a daily average of between 26,000 and 28,000 listeners. Thus, it has a market share of 5.8%.

The programming is mainly focused on classical music and culture, much like Radio SRF 2 Kultur and Espace 2.

It broadcasts on DAB, but also via satellite and online. On 1 January 2025, the station ceased FM transmissions.

== Programmes ==
- Verde Aurora
- Laser
- Agenda classica
- La citazione
- Geronimo
- Finestra Aperta
- Colpo di scena
- Rete 2-5
- Rete Due Informa
- Il pifferaio magico
- Prima fila
- Birdland
- Disco volante
- Concerto dell'OSI

== See also ==
- Radiotelevisione svizzera di lingua italiana
- RSI Rete Uno
- RSI Rete Tre
