= SWISS TXT =

Swiss multimedia and teletext company

SWISS TXT Corp. (SWISS TXT AG)
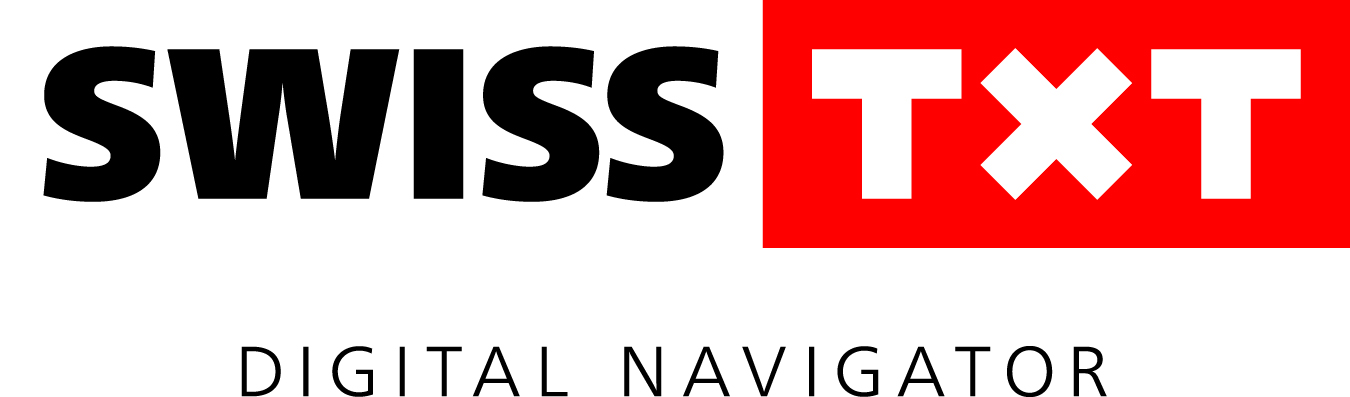
- Company type: Corporation
- Industry: Media
- Genre: Multimedia
- Founded: 1983 in Biel/Bienne, Switzerland
- Headquarters: Biel/Bienne (canton of Bern), Switzerland
- Key people: Martin Schneider (CEO); Marco Derighetti (Chairman Board of Directors)
- Revenue: 23.5 million CHF (2019)
- Owner: Swiss Broadcasting Corporation
- Number of employees: 880
- Website: www.swisstxt.ch

SWISS TXT (SWISS TXT Corporation) (until December 2015: SWISS TXT Schweizerische Teletext AG) is a subsidiary and the centre of multimedia expertise of the Swiss Broadcasting Corporation.

== History ==
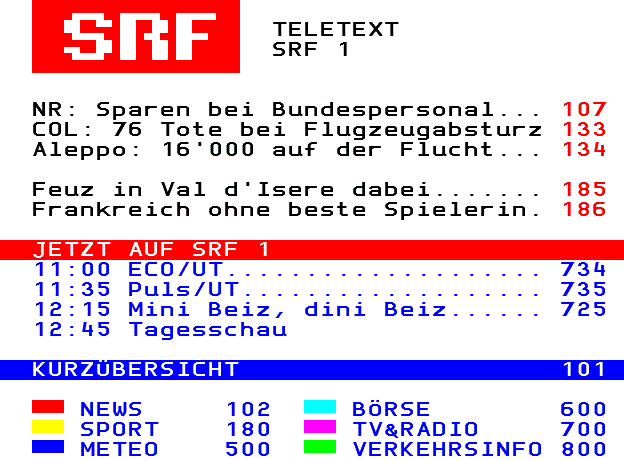
SRF 1 Videotext (2016)

The company was founded on 23 December 1983 with a licence granted by the Swiss Federal Council Teletext Licence.

The Teletext service started operations on SF DRS in 1984, on TSR in 1985 and on TSI in 1986. In 2001, the number of daily viewers reached a record of 1.17 million. In 2004, that number reached 1.3 million a day.

Until 2015, SWISS TXT was responsible for the development, operation and commercialization of the Teletext service on television channels operated by the Swiss Broadcasting Corporation. Between 2005 and 2008, the Teletext editorial department was integrated into Swiss Broadcasting Corporation television channels SRF 1, SRF zwei, RTS Un, RTS Deux, RSI La 1, RSI La 2 operations.

The multimedia sector was expanded in 2009. With the strategic reorientation on 1 January 2016, SWISS TXT operates in multimedia for the Swiss Broadcasting Corporation and on the third-party market.

== Organisation ==
SWISS TXT has its headquarters in Biel/Bienne and branch offices in Zürich, Bern, Geneva, Lausanne and Comano.

== Access Services (subtitling, transcription, translation, audio description, speech-to-text) ==
SWISS TXT subtitles the Swiss Broadcasting Corporation television programmes. It also provides transcription, translation and audio description services.

== Further services as a multimedia provider ==
- Software-as-a-Service (SaaS): Media Cloud, mediahub and video delivery platforms VDP/Kaltura.
- Infrastructure-as-a-Service (IaaS): Storage, content delivery network CDN, livestreaming.
- Platforms-as-a-Service (PaaS): Docker, Kubernetes.
- Hybrid Broadband Broadcast TV (HbbTV): Interactive television.
- Multi-device-solutions for sport: multimedia platforms
- Consulting: Advice on video strategy.
