= Rai Südtirol (radio station) =

German language radio station in South Tyrol, Italy

Coordinates: 46.5014°N 11.3388°E

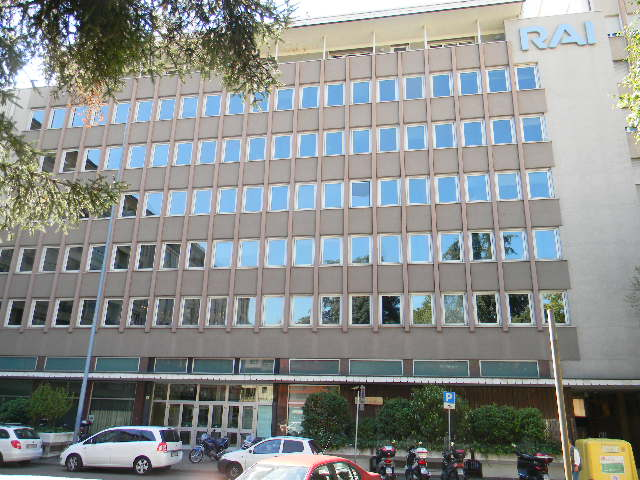
- The headquarters of the RAI in Bolzano
- Italy
- Broadcast area: South Tyrol
- Frequencies: FM several frequencies, change from geographical site to side of

Programming
- Format: German and Ladin-language programming.

Ownership
- Owner: RAI

History
- First air date: 1960

Links
- Webcast: MP3 live stream
- Website: raibz.rai.it (Italian) raibz.rai.it (German)

Rai Südtirol is a German language radio station produced by the Italian public-service broadcasting network RAI from its studios in Bolzano. The station programming is aimed to the German-speaking listeners in South Tyrol.

Rai Südtirol has roots in a station operated by the Ente Italiano per le Audizioni Radiofoniche, whose inaugural broadcast aired on 12 July 1928, then in the Italian language, as part of the propaganda of the Mussolini government. German language contributions began in 1945, with the first broadcast in Ladin the following year. In 1960, Rai Bozen began transmitting from Mazziniplatz in Bolzano; it was later renamed to Rai Südtirol.
