= Radiotelevisione svizzera =

Broadcaster in Lugano, Switzerland

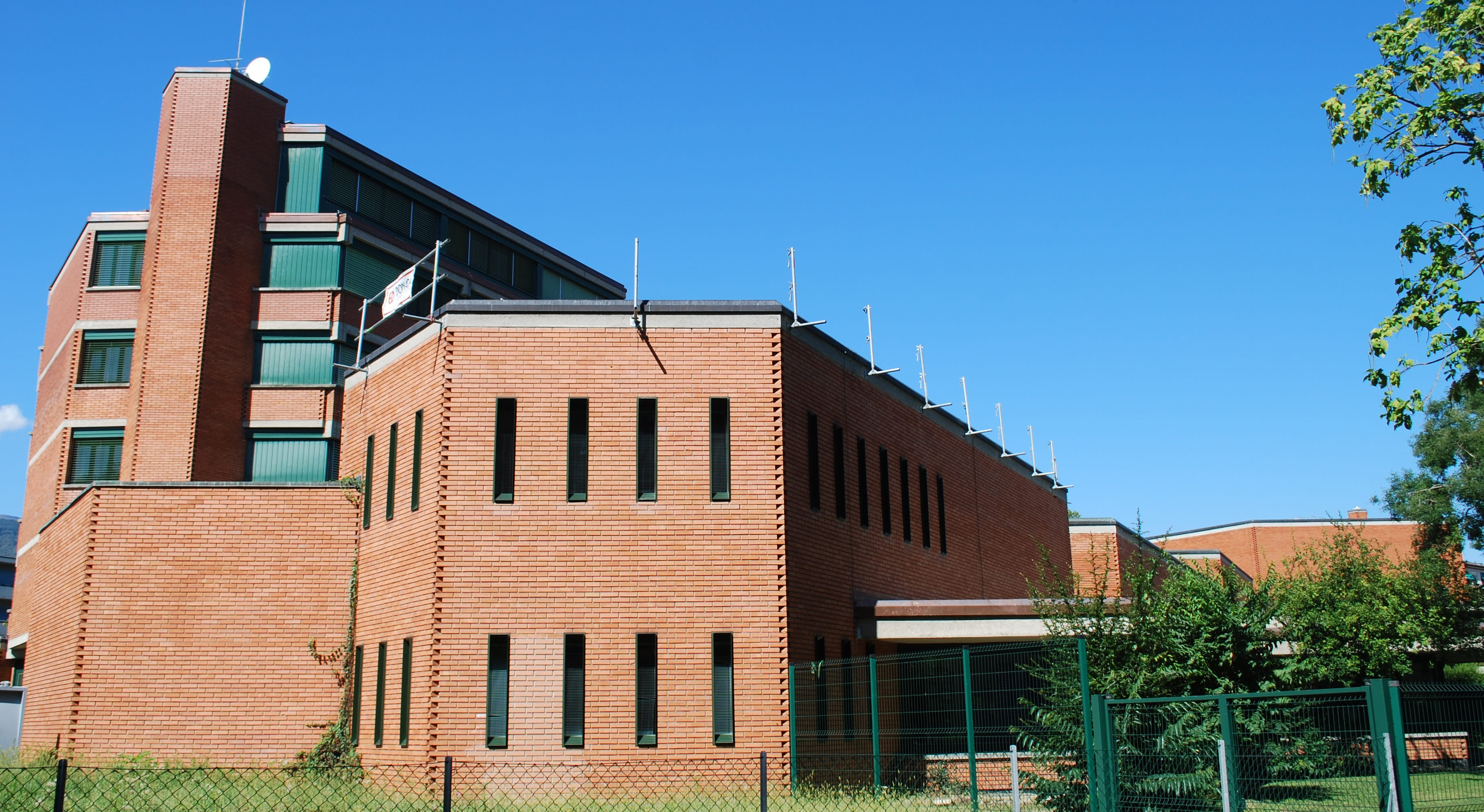
- RSI radio studio, facade of the west complex
- Type: Terrestrial, radio, television and online
- Country: Switzerland
- Availability: Switzerland, online
- Motto: La tua storia ("Your story")
- TV stations: La 1, La 2
- Radio stations: Rete Uno, Rete Due, Rete Tre
- Headquarters: Lugano, Ticino, Switzerland
- Broadcast area: Switzerland and Lombardy
- Parent: SRG SSR
- Key people: Mario Timbal
- Launch date: 1931; 95 years ago
- Official website: www.rsi.ch

Radiotelevisione svizzera, officially Radiotelevisione svizzera di lingua italiana (Italian pronunciation: [ˌradjoteleviˈzjoːne ˈzvittsera di ˈliŋɡwa itaˈljaːna]; "Italian-Language Swiss Radio and Television"), shortened to RSI (formerly RTSI until 2009), is a subsidiary of the Swiss Broadcasting Corporation (SRG SSR), operating in Italian-speaking Switzerland. Besides Italian, the official language of Ticino, RSI also handles the production and broadcasting of programs in the Ticinese dialect of Lombard, the vernacular language of the region. Its administrative headquarters are located in Via Canevascini in Lugano, Ticino.

== History ==
Radio svizzera di lingua italiana was established in 1925 as Radio Monte Ceneri, originally named after the mountain where the transmitter was placed. After several years of experimental broadcast, in 1933 the Società svizzera di Radiodiffusione (Swiss Radio Broadcasting Corporation) began regular transmissions in Ticino and Grisons. The intentions of its founders were to promote cohesion in the confederation while promoting the value of the Swiss Italian culture. In the 1930s and 1940s, when most of Switzerland's neighboring states were under fascism (Italian Fascism and National Socialism), Radio Monte Ceneri was the only Italian-language radio free of censorship, becoming the only reliable voice for the Italian population and a prominent outlet for Italian intellectuals; during these years it hosted people like Benedetto Croce and Delio Tessa.

The first TV broadcasts date back to 1958, at first produced in studios in Zürich and transmitted with Italian subtitles. In 1961, with the foundation of Televisione svizzera di lingua italiana (TSI), the studios were relocated in Paradiso, near Lugano. This was eight years after the experimental debut of television in Zürich and Geneva. The channel began broadcasting in colour in 1968.

During the 1970s, when Italian television was still under the RAI monopoly, Swiss television in Italian was the only alternative to the public network for Italians living in Lombardy and Piedmont: the signal reached the city of Milan. Some important personalities of Italian television, such as Corrado, Mina, Enzo Tortora and the founder of the first commercial television in Italy, Telebiella, Peppo Sacchi worked with TSI.

RSI launched two new thematic radio stations, a cultural one, Rete Due, in 1985 and another more youth-oriented, Rete Tre, in 1989.

In 1997 a second channel was created, called TSI 2. The first TSI channel thus was renamed TSI 1.

In December 2005, RSI began digital broadcasts using the DAB system on the Saint Gottard autoroute. On 26 July 2006 at 12:45, SRG SSR idée suisse interrupted analog broadcasting in Ticino making it the first all-digital canton of Switzerland. This affected the Italians in northern Italy, as they were deprived of all the TSI channels, with the sole exception of those near the border.

Starting from 1 January 2025, all RSI's radio stations stopped transmitting in FM.

== Logo history ==
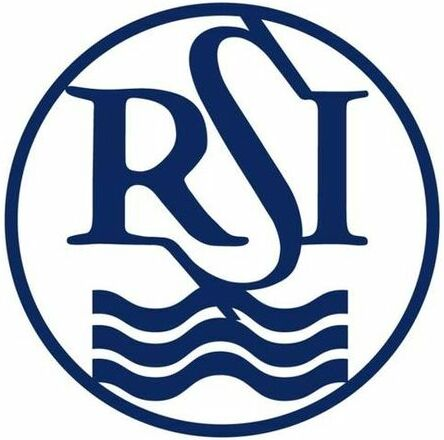
RSI's first logo used from 1936 to 1961.

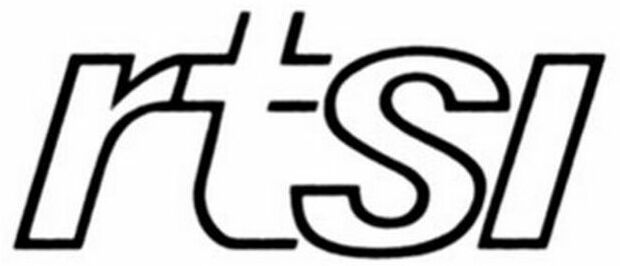
RSI's second logo used from 1982 to 1985.

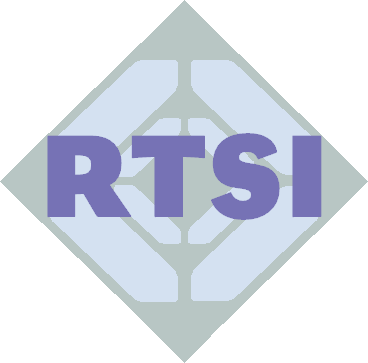
RSI's third logo used from 1985 to 1993.

RSI's fifth logo used from 1999 to 28 February 2009.

Logo used by RSI's radio division.

Logo used by RSI's TV division.

RSI's sixth and previous logo used until 29 February 2012.

RSI's seventh and current logo since 1 March 2012.

== Direction ==
General Director:

- Mario Timbal

=== Headquarters ===
The administrative headquarters of RSI are located in Via Canevascini in Lugano-Besso. RSI television studios are found in Comano, 5 km north of Lugano.

== Operations ==
=== Radio ===
RSI's radio department is in charge of production and transmission radio programs in the Italian language for the Italian speaking Swiss. Its studios are located in Via Canevascini in Lugano-Besso. It was known as Radio svizzera di lingua italiana (RSI) until 2009.

- RSI Rete Uno – general programming
- RSI Rete Due – cultural, intellectual programming, classical music
- RSI Rete Tre – youth-oriented programming

The three networks can also be listened to via the Internet in streaming on the broadcaster's website. Some programs are distributed as podcasts and on Play RSI.

SRG currently uses two data streams (transponders 17 and 123) to transmit its radio programs via satellite. New technologies now allow greater efficiency in the exploitation of existing satellite capacity. Therefore, from 9 March, SRG will reconfigure its new transponder and transfer its 26 radio networks to transponder 123.

Transponder 17 will operate in parallel until the end of June and will then be deactivated. The audio quality will remain unchanged.

=== Television ===
RSI's television department is in charge of production and transmission of television programs in the Italian language for the Italian speaking Swiss. Its studios are found in Comano, 5 km north of Lugano. It was known as Televisione svizzera di lingua italiana (TSI) until 2009.

- RSI La 1
- RSI La 2

Swiss public broadcaster SRG terminated the digital terrestrial distribution of its TV channels (DTT) via DVB-T nationwide on 3 June 2019. DTT viewers were informed about the switch-off, which was announced in September 2018, through a caption on the TV screens from January 2019. SRG recommended affected households to switch to an alternative reception infrastructure, such as DTH satellite, cable, IPTV or internet streaming.

== See also ==
- Monte Ceneri transmitter
- Television in Switzerland
