= Neckar-Alb =

Region in Tübingen, Germany

- Region
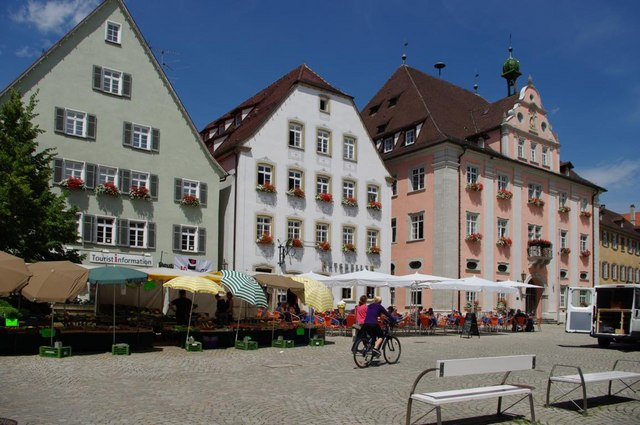
- Rottenburg
- Country: Germany
- State: Baden-Württemberg
- Adm. Region: Tübingen

Area
  - Total: 2,531.03 km^{2} (977.24 sq mi)

Population (September 2004)
  - Total: 690,006
  - Density: 272.619/km^{2} (706.079/sq mi)
- Website: Official website

Neckar-Alb is one of three regions (Regionalverband) in the Tübingen administrative region (Regierungsbezirke) in Baden-Württemberg, Germany. It contains the Neckar river.

Neckar-Alb is the third largest industrial zone in Germany. It is divided into:

- Reutlingen district
- Tübingen district
- Zollernalb district
