= RTS 1 (Swiss TV channel) =

- Logo used since 2023
- Country: Switzerland

Programming
- Language: French

Ownership
- Owner: RTS Radio Télévision Suisse
- Sister channels: RTS 2, RTS Info

History
- Launched: 1 May 1954
- Former names: Télévision suisse romande TSR (1954–1997); TSR 1 (1997–2012); RTS Un (2012–2019)

Links
- Website: Official site (Only in Switzerland)

RTS 1 (French: RTS Un) is a Swiss public television channel owned by RTS Radio Télévision Suisse, the public broadcaster for the Romand people.

== History ==
Launched on 1 May 1954 to succeed Télé Genève, RTS Un is the first channel of the two Swiss French networks of television group RTS (the other being RTS Deux). The channel first aired programmes in colour in 1968.

RTS took part in the creation of TV5 in 1984, and provides programmes for the international channel.

In 1990 Andrea Marconi created the brand identity with the new logo of the humanized profile of the then TSR.

Following the launch of TSR 2 in 1997, TSR renamed itself TSR 1 and RTS Un in 2012.

RTS Un is available in Aosta Valley, Italy, due to Italian self-government laws, and until the cessation of all digital terrestrial signals in Switzerland in 2019 could also be received in the border areas via spillover.

== Logos and identities ==
TSR 1 logo from 1997 to 2006

TSR 1 logo from 2006 to 2012

RTS Un logo from 2012 to 2015

RTS Un HD logo from 2012 to 2015

RTS Un logo from 2015 to 2019

RTS 1 logo from 2019 to 2023

RTS 1 logo since 2023

== See also ==
- 26 minutes
- Station Horizon
