= RTS Couleur 3 =

Radio station in Switzerland

- Switzerland
- Broadcast area: Switzerland
- Frequencies: DAB, Satellite (Hot Bird), IPTV, Streaming

Ownership
- Owner: RTS Radio Télévision Suisse

History
- First air date: 24 February 1982; 44 years ago

Links
- Webcast: ,
- Website: www.rts.ch/couleur3

RTS Couleur 3 (lit. "Colour 3") is the third radio station operated by RTS Radio Télévision Suisse. The station was launched on 24 February 1982.

Until the end of all FM transmissions on 31 December 2024, RTS Couleur 3 could be received in French-speaking Switzerland and in the canton of Bern on FM. Nowadays, RTS Couleur 3 can be received nationwide on DAB, satellite (Hot Bird) and IPTV, as well as worldwide via the Internet.

On 27 April 2023, Couleur 3 broadcast 13 hours of radio content that was produced with cloned voices. The texts were generated by ChatGPT.

== See also ==
- Radio suisse romande
- 120 secondes
