= Radiotelevisiun Svizra Rumantscha =

Romansh-language public broadcaster in Switzerland

- Type: Broadcast, radio, television and online
- Country: Switzerland
- Availability: Switzerland, online
- TV stations: TvR Televisiun Rumantscha
- Radio stations: Radio Rumantsch
- Headquarters: Chur
- Broadcast area: Romansh Grischun
- Parent: SRG SSR
- Official website: http://www.rtr.ch
- Language: Romansh

Radiotelevisiun Svizra Rumantscha ("Swiss Romansh Radio-Television"; formerly Radio e Televisiun Rumantscha, "Romansh Radio and Television"), shortened to RTR, is a subsidiary of the Swiss Broadcasting Corporation (SRG SSR), operating in Romansh-speaking Switzerland.

== History ==
RTR logo until 31 December 2010.

The first radio program in Romansh was broadcast on 17 January 1925. The person responsible for this broadcast was Felix Huonder. Regular Romansh programming began in 1943. Las Cristallas, the Romansh "radioscola" (radio school, or lectures delivered by radio broadcast), premiered on 27 January 1955.

Il Balcun Tort, the first television program in Romansh, was broadcast on 17 February 1963. This commemorated the 25th anniversary of Romansh's becoming Switzerland's fourth national language.

Mariano Tschuor was the director of RTR for the four years to 2014. On 1 August of that year, he swapped jobs with Ladina Heimgartner, who became the first woman to lead RTR. Heimgartner remained in that post until 2020, when Nicolas Pernet took over as director. Pernet publicly opposed the SBC initiative, which proposed heavily cutting the funding for Swiss public broadcasting.

== Broadcasting ==
=== Radio ===
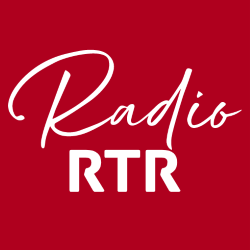
Radio RTR logo

Radio RTR is a Swiss radio station broadcasting in Romansh. The Editor in Chief is Flavio Bundi.

=== Television ===
Televisiun Rumantscha (TvR) is RTR's television production unit. It does not have its own dedicated channel; instead RSI La 2, SRF 1, SRF zwei and SRF info air TvR programming for a few hours a day.

It produces 90 minutes of television programmes a week. Its programmes comprise approximately of 50 hours of in house productions, 6 hours of programmes purchased from another broadcaster and 20 hours of special occasions. The Editor in Chief is Flavio Bundi.
