= RSI Rete Tre =

- Switzerland
- Broadcast area: Switzerland: DAB, TV, Internet radio

Programming
- Language: Italian

Ownership
- Owner: RSI

History
- First air date: 1 January 1988

Links
- Webcast: ,
- Website: www.rsi.ch/home/networks/retetre

RSI Rete Tre is the third Italian-language radio station from Radiotelevisione svizzera di lingua italiana (RSI) in Switzerland, aimed at younger listeners broadcasting popular and alternative music. It was launched at 00:03 on 1 January 1988, and is available via DAB+, IPTV, satellite and the Internet.

On 1 January 2008, a party was held in the city centre of Lugano, beginning at 0:03, to celebrate the twentieth anniversary of the station, with a special song "We Are Rete Tre" (cover of the more famous "We Are the World").

During Radioday 2010, RSI Rete Tre was awarded the title of "Swiss Radio of the Year", an award it previously won in 2008.

As of 1 January 2025, FM transmissions are permanently discontinued. Previously, RSI Rete Tre's FM network mainly covered the Italian-speaking cantons of Ticino and Graubünden.

== See also ==
- Radiotelevisione svizzera di lingua italiana
- RSI Rete Uno
- RSI Rete Due
