= Radio fréquence Jura =

Swiss radio station

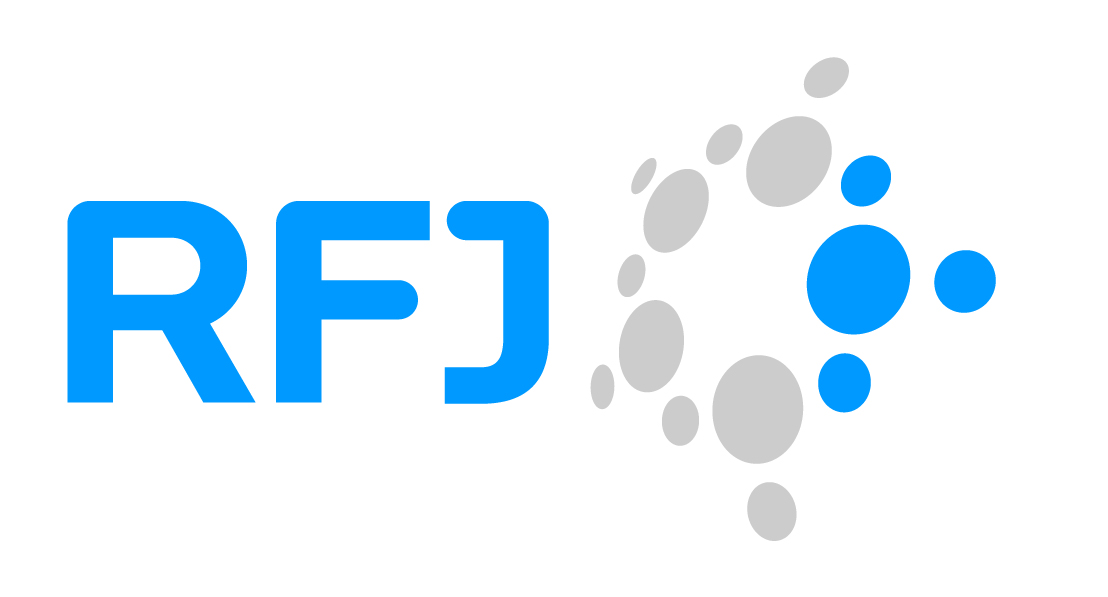
- Delémont; Switzerland
- Broadcast area: Jura

Programming
- Language: French

Links
- Website: www.rfj.ch

Radio fréquence Jura (RFJ) is a private French-language radio broadcaster in regional Switzerland. It broadcasts in the Canton of Jura, La Chaux-de-Fonds, and part of the Bernese Jura.

The station's studios are located in Delémont (JU).
