= Radio Télévision Suisse =

French-language branch of the Swiss Broadcasting Corporation

- Type: Broadcast, radio, television and online
- Country: Switzerland
- Availability: online in Switzerland
- Founded: 1 January 2010; 16 years ago
- TV stations: RTS 1; RTS 2; RTS Info
- Radio stations: RTS Première; RTS Espace 2; RTS Couleur 3; RTS Option Musique
- Headquarters: Geneva
- Broadcast area: Switzerland (eastern) France
- Parent: SRG SSR
- Key people: Gilles Marchand and Gilles Pache
- Official website: www.rts.ch
- Replaced: Radio Suisse Romande (RSR); Télévision Suisse Romande (TSR)

The Radio Télévision Suisse (French pronunciation: [ʁadjo televizjɔ̃ sɥis]; "Swiss Radio Television"), shortened to RTS, is a subsidiary of the Swiss Broadcasting Corporation (SRG SSR), operating in French-speaking Switzerland. It was created on 1 January 2010 by a merger of Radio Suisse Romande (RSR) and Télévision Suisse Romande (TSR).

== History ==
The first evening programme to be broadcast in colour on Télévision suisse romande was aired in 1968.

The station has been accused of multiple cases of sexual harassment and pedocriminality in recent years, including accusations against news personality Darius Rochebin.

=== Future ===
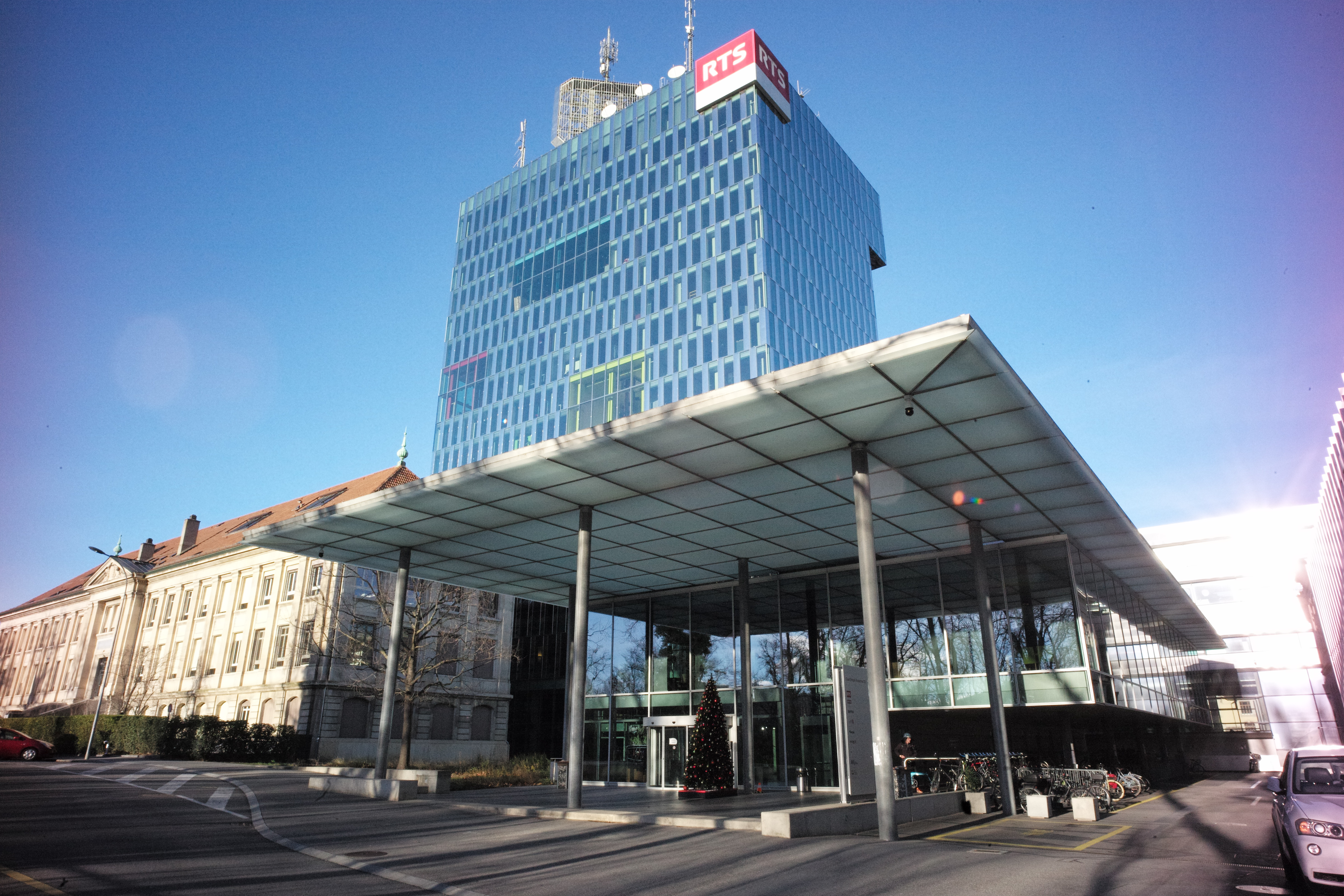
The tower of the Radio Télévision Suisse in Geneva

While keeping its headquarters in Geneva, Radio Télévision Suisse moved its Lausanne-based radio headquarters to a new building on the Lausanne campus in 2020.

== Broadcasting ==
=== Radio ===
Radio Suisse Romande (RSR) is the area of RTS in charge of production and broadcasting of radio programming in French for Switzerland:

- RTS Première – general programming
- RTS Espace 2 – cultural and intellectual programming; classical and jazz music
- RTS Couleur 3 – youth programming
- RTS Option Musique – music and variety programming

=== Television ===
Télévision Suisse Romande (TSR) is the area of RTS in charge of production and distribution of television programming in French for Switzerland:

- RTS 1
- RTS 2
- RTS Info

== See also ==
- Schweizer Radio und Fernsehen
- Public Francophone Radios
