= SWI swissinfo =

Swiss news and information platform

- Website type: News and information
- Available in: 10 languages
- List of languages: German; French; Italian; English; Spanish; Portuguese; Russian; Arabic; Chinese; Japanese
- Headquarters: Bern, {{{location_country}}}
- Country of origin: Switzerland
- Editor: Mark Livingston
- President: Larissa Bieler
- Website: www.swissinfo.ch
- Commercial: No
- Registration: 1999

SWI swissinfo.ch is a Swiss multilingual international news and information company based in Bern. It is a part of the Swiss Broadcasting Corporation (SRG SSR). Its content is Swiss-centred, with top priority given to in-depth information on politics, the economy, the arts, science, education, and direct democracy. Switzerland's international political, economic and cultural relations are other key points of focus. The website is available in ten languages.

== History ==
SWI swissinfo.ch emerged from the Swiss Radio International (SRI), a business unit of SRG SSR for foreign countries. It was founded in 1935 and had the task of informing the Swiss abroad about what is happening in Switzerland and promoting Switzerland's presence abroad. Originally, radio programs were broadcast via short wave and later via satellites.

In the mid-1990s, economic circumstances forced swissinfo.ch to take a new strategic direction. The internet was advancing fast, heralding a new era for the producing journalists and the Swiss Radio International (SRI) audience alike. The German, French, English and Portuguese sites went online in 1999. The Italian, Japanese and Spanish sites followed in 2000, with Arabic going live on 1 February 2001 and Chinese in September of the same year. Within just two years, the internet platform for expatriate Swiss was already better known than SRI's short-wave radio services. In 2014 swissinfo rebranded to "SWI swissinfo.ch".

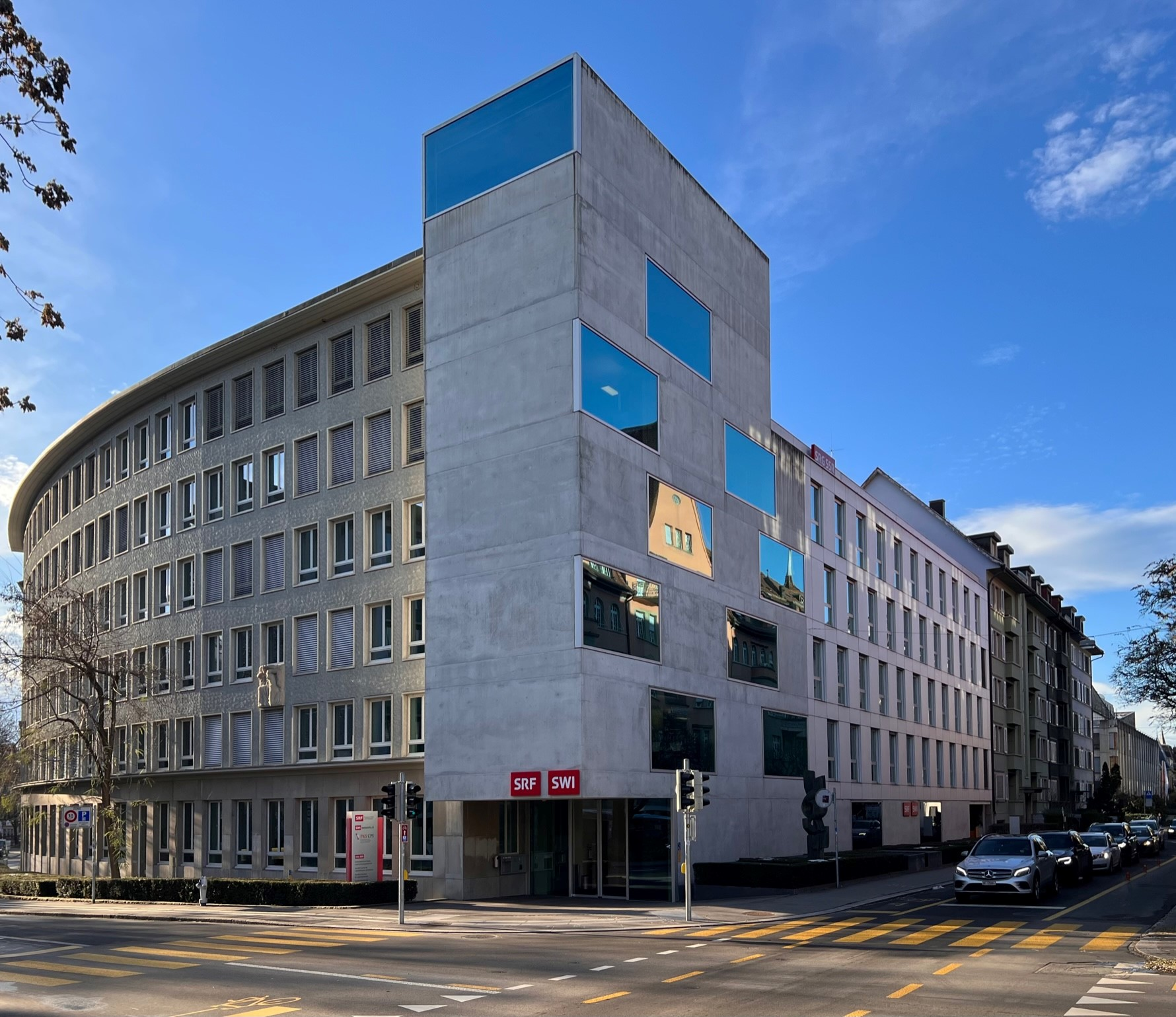
SWI swissinfo.ch building in Schwarztorstrasse 21 Bern.

On 21 March 2005, the Board of Directors of SRG SSR decided to reduce the service of swissinfo.ch significantly. At the time, the decision was not final and still had to be confirmed by the regulatory body – the Federal Office of Communications – and the Swiss Federal Council. The initial plan of the SRG SSR was to produce a service in English only. This service was to be integrated into SR DRS, the radio branch of what is today the German-language broadcaster SRF. Only some specific information for Swiss people living abroad would be published in Switzerland's national languages (German, French and Italian). The plan is also to employ one journalist for each national language and the service would be produced by one of the existing SRG SSR enterprise units. SRG SSR's intention to cut back on swissinfo.ch to a minimum met enormous dismay from users and readers. Eventually, the public had their way, preventing the reduction in services. In the summer of 2007, the Federal Council issued SWI swissinfo.ch with a new charter to provide specific and clearly defined internet-focused news, information, and entertainment services. In 2013, swissinfo.ch welcomed Russian as 10th language of the information platform. In 2023 more than 100 persons of 14 nationalities are working for SWI swissinfo.ch.

Christoph Heri, the editor-in-chief of swissinfo.ch, retired on 31 March 2008 after a 30-year media career, the last six years of which were spent with the SWI swissinfo.ch editorial team. Peter Schibli became the new editor-in-chief of swissinfo.ch on 1 January 2008. Schibli, who holds a doctorate in law. He was charged with fulfilling the content aspects of the Federal Council charter and with positioning SWI swissinfo.ch as a multilingual news and information platform for both expatriate Swiss and an international audience with an interest in Switzerland. In November 2008, Schibli became the director of swissinfo.ch. From November 2008 to February 2015 Christophe Giovannini served as swissinfo.ch editor-in-chief. In January 2016, Larissa M. Bieler started as the editor-in-chief. Born in Chur, she studied German literature, economics, and political science. She worked as a freelance journalist, and from 2013 served as editor-in-chief of the Bündner Tagblatt. In October 2018 she was appointed Director of SWI swissinfo.ch and led the business unit in a dual role until summer 2022, Larissa M. Bieler became a member of the SRG Executive Board since July 2022. In 2022, Mark Livingston became the SWI swissinfo.ch editor-in-chief.

SWI swissinfo.ch is a member of the Journalism Trust Initiative. In 2023, SWI swissinfo.ch has won a prize in the “science and environment” category of an annual award organised by Swiss magazine Private. In 2023, SWI swissinfo.ch won the Social Impact Award for Diversity and Inclusion at the IBC - International Broadcasting Convention.

== Special features ==
SWI swissinfo.ch themed focus pages and multimedia longform reports offer a high-quality complement to its websites. Produced specifically for an international audience, these multimedia reports examine and present current issues in detail. There is also a special section for expatriate Swiss that gives information on forthcoming referendums and elections. These including in-depth articles and a roundtable video interview "Let's Talk". SWI swissinfo.ch is also active on different social media channels: Facebook, Twitter, Instagram, YouTube, etc. From 2019, SWI swissinfo.ch started to publish the Inside Geneva Podcast as part of its new audio content. Between April 2022 and December 2023, SWI swissinfo.ch was also providing a special offer in Ukrainian. The website is available in ten languages.

In addition to the websites, information can be called up from or downloaded to mobile devices. The headline service automatically updates computer desktop headlines from the swissinfo.ch homepages. Headlines can also be linked via live news feeds directly to other websites. In March 2017 swissinfo.ch launched a new app SWI Plus (for iOS and Android) aimed at Swiss abroad users.

== See also ==
- Presence Switzerland
