= Radio SRF Musikwelle =

- Switzerland
- Broadcast area: Switzerland: FM, TV, DAB

Programming
- Language: German

Ownership
- Owner: Schweizer Radio und Fernsehen (SRF)

History
- First air date: 1 October 1996 (as DRS Musigwälle)

Links
- Webcast: Official webcast
- Website: Official website

Radio SRF Musikwelle is the sixth radio station from Schweizer Radio und Fernsehen (SRF) and is broadcast in German-speaking Switzerland.

== History ==
The station was launched on 1 October 1996 (as DRS Musigwälle) on 531 kHz medium wave from the Blosenbergturm transmitter. It was the spiritual successor to SRF's light music programming on its former flagship 529 kHz medium wave service (which is now Radio SRF 1). Medium wave broadcasts ended on 29 December 2008.

Nowadays, the station can be received on DAB in German-speaking Switzerland and Canton Ticino, across Europe via satellite (Eutelsat) and over the Internet.
