= RTS Espace 2 =

- Lausanne; Switzerland
- Broadcast area: Switzerland: DAB, TV, Internet radio

Programming
- Language: French
- Format: Cultural

Ownership
- Owner: RTS Radio Télévision Suisse

History
- First air date: 30 September 1956

Links
- Webcast: ,
- Website: www.rts.ch/espace-2

RTS Espace 2 is the cultural radio station from the public company, RTS Radio Télévision Suisse, part of the SRG SSR, and is broadcast in French-speaking Switzerland. Its slogan is La vie côté culture (The cultural side of life).

Programming consists mainly of classical music and jazz (JazzZ), but there are also magazine and discussion programmes on current (Les Temps qui courent) and historical topics (Histoire vivante), and literature programming (Entre les lignes).

The station was founded in 1956 with its headquarters in Lausanne, Switzerland, at the same time FM radio was introduced to the country. SRG SSR ended all FM radio broadcasts at the end of 2024.

It broadcasts nationwide on DAB, but also via cable, satellite and online, where a live stream and podcasts are available. Two of the popular podcasts are Comme il vous plaira, which talks about human science and history, and L’humeur vagabonde, which is about the lives of famous people.
