= RTS 2 (Swiss TV channel) =

- Country: Switzerland

Ownership
- Owner: RTS Radio Télévision Suisse
- Sister channels: RTS 1, RTS Info

History
- Launched: 1 September 1997
- Replaced: S Plus; Schweiz 4
- Former names: TSR 2 (1997–2012); RTS Deux (2012–2019)

Links
- Website: Official site (Only in Switzerland)

Availability

Terrestrial
- Digital: ~~DVB-T~~ (only for French-speaking Switzerland; ceased on 3 June 2019)

RTS 2 (RTS deux), launched on 1 September 1997 as TSR2 and renamed in 2012, is the second Swiss (French-speaking) public television channel owned by RTS Radio Télévision Suisse (RTS); the other is RTS 1.

== Logos and identities ==
TSR 2's logo from 1997 to 2006

TSR 2's logo from 2006 to 2012

RTS Deux's logo from 2012 to 2015

RTS Deux's logo from 2015 to 2019

RTS 2's logo from 2019 to 2023

== Programming ==
The channel's programming is composed of reruns from the RTS 1 television archive, children's television programs in the morning and early afternoon, teens programs in the late afternoon and evening and cultural programs or sports transmissions during prime time.
