= Radio SRF 2 Kultur =

- Switzerland

Ownership
- Owner: SRG SSR / Schweizer Radio und Fernsehen

History
- First air date: 1956 (as DRS 2)

Links
- Webcast: Official webcast
- Website: Official website

Radio SRF 2 Kultur is one of six radio channels operated by Schweizer Radio und Fernsehen (SRF), the German-language division of the Swiss public-broadcasting organisation SRG SSR. First started in 1956 (at the same time as the introduction of FM broadcasting in the country) as DRS 2, the channel was relaunched under its present name on 16 December 2012.

== Programming ==
As its name implies, Radio SRF 2 Kultur is a cultural channel. Its programming is designed to appeal to listeners of all ages for whom knowledge and learning are sources of interest and pleasure. The channel's speech content consists of features, talks, drama, readings, magazine and discussion programmes in which the emphasis is on dealing with matters extensively and in depth. "Art music" forms the major part of the channel's musical output; however, this category is not confined to classical but also includes challenging examples from the genres of pop, chanson, jazz, world and experimental music.

== Listeners' club ==
Listeners to Radio SRF 2 Kultur may join SRF Kulturclub which publishes a monthly magazine, organizes activities related to the channel's programmes and other cultural activities, and offers its members reduced admission to selected events.

== Reception ==
Radio SRF 2 Kultur is available in all of Switzerland via DAB and cable, across Europe via satellite, and worldwide via the Internet. From its launch in 1956 until the end of 2024 it was also available on FM in the German-speaking areas of Switzerland.

== Former logos ==
1993-2003

2003–2007

2007–2012

2012-2020
