= Radio SRF Virus =

- Switzerland

Ownership
- Owner: Schweizer Radio und Fernsehen (SRF)

History
- First air date: 20 November 1999
- Former names: DRS Virus (1999–2007); DRS virus.ch (2007–2012)

Links
- Webcast: Official webcast
- Website: Official website

Radio SRF Virus is a radio station from Schweizer Radio und Fernsehen (SRF). The station was launched in 1999 (as DRS Virus) and is broadcast on cable and DAB+ in German-speaking Switzerland as well as throughout Europe on satellite and worldwide via the Internet.

The station serves to provide an alternative music choice to Radio SRF 3, while providing the same news offerings to its younger audience.

== Former logos ==
1999–2007

2007–2012

2012–2020

2020–2022
