= Radio SRF 4 News =

Swiss radio station

- Switzerland
- Broadcast area: Switzerland

Ownership
- Owner: Schweizer Radio und Fernsehen (SRF)

History
- First air date: 5 November 2007 (as DRS 4 News)

Links
- Webcast: Official webcast
- Website: Official website

Radio SRF 4 News is the fourth radio station from Schweizer Radio und Fernsehen (SRF). The station was launched on 5 November 2007 (as DRS 4 News).

Swiss Radio and Television (SRF) is Switzerland's national public broadcasting organization, providing television, radio, and online services. As a division of the Swiss Broadcasting Corporation (SRG SSR), SRF is responsible for producing and distributing content across various media platforms in Switzerland.

== Overview ==
SRF operates several television channels, including SRF 1, SRF zwei (SRF Two), and SRF info, as well as multiple radio stations such as SRF 1, SRF 2 Kultur, and SRF 3. The organization delivers a diverse range of programming, including news, entertainment, culture, and sports, catering to the various linguistic regions of Switzerland—German, French, and Italian.

== Digital Presence ==
SRF maintains a digital presence through its official website srf.ch. The site provides access to live streams of TV and radio broadcasts, on-demand video content, news articles, and other multimedia resources. Users can also access podcasts, watch live broadcasts, and explore special features related to current affairs, cultural events, and sports.

== News and Information ==
The SRF website features a dedicated news section, offering information on national and international events. This section includes articles, interviews, and reports on a wide range of topics.

== Programming ==
The stations programming includes: national and international news, politics, economy, stock market, sport, culture, science, information technology, media and training.
