= Radio SRF 3 =

- Switzerland
- Broadcast area: Switzerland

Ownership
- Owner: Schweizer Radio und Fernsehen (SRF)

History
- First air date: 1 November 1983 (as DRS 3)

Links
- Webcast: Official webcast
- Website: Official website

Radio SRF 3 is the third radio station from Schweizer Radio und Fernsehen (SRF).

== History ==
The station was launched on 1 November 1983 at 00:01 hours (as DRS 3) in response to the licensing of private radio stations in Switzerland. During its early years, it couldn't be received on FM in Central Switzerland.

It originally primarily played music aimed at a younger audience, and was later repositioned as a "generalist young-adults" station in 1999 following the launch of DRS Virus that same year. The station broadcasts in Swiss German, except news programs, which are transmitted in Swiss Standard German or Standard German.

== Former logos ==
1993-2003

2003–2007

2007–2012

2012–2020
