= RTS Première =

Coordinates: 46.537595°N 6.652737°E

- Switzerland
- Broadcast area: Switzerland

Ownership
- Owner: RTS Radio Télévision Suisse

History
- First air date: 30 September 1922

Links
- Webcast: ,
- Website: www.rts.ch/la-1ere

RTS Première (French pronunciation: [ɛʁteɛs la pʁəmjɛʁ]) is the first French-language radio station in Switzerland, owned by RTS Radio Télévision Suisse. It began broadcasting in 1922 as the first overall radio station in Switzerland and was only the third radio station to launch in Europe. Its programming is general, cultural and musical. Its studios are located in Lausanne.

== Broadcasting ==
RTS Première is broadcast in Switzerland via DAB, satellite radio (Hot Bird), cable radio and the Internet. Some programmes are provided as a podcast. Until the end of 2024 RTS Première was also available on FM.
