= Radio SRF 1 =

- Zürich; Switzerland
- Frequencies: DAB, cable, satellite, streaming

Programming
- Language: German
- Format: Soft AC

Ownership
- Owner: Schweizer Radio und Fernsehen (SRF)

History
- First air date: 11 June 1931 (as Radio Beromünster)
- Former frequencies: FM

Links
- Webcast: Official webcast
- Website: Official website

Radio SRF 1 is a Swiss radio channel, one of six operated by Schweizer Radio und Fernsehen (SRF), with its headquarters in Zürich.

It was launched in 1931 as Radio Beromünster (named after the Beromünster municipality on which its original transmission tower was located) and was the first German-language radio station for German-speaking Switzerland.

== Programmes ==
The channel is receivable throughout Switzerland via DAB, cable, satellite and the internet. Until the end of 2024 the channel also broadcast on FM.

Programming is mainly general and includes news and entertainment, as well as satire, games, and radio broadcasts for children. Music programme is more-or-less Soft AC format, including hits mostly from the 80's to nowadays.

Radio SRF 1 broadcasts regional content several times a day in the following areas of German-speaking Switzerland:

- Aargau / Solothurn
- Basel
- Bern - Fribourg - Valais
- Central Switzerland
- Eastern Switzerland
- Zürich / Schaffhausen

== Former logos ==
2003–2007

2007–2012

2012–2020

2020–2022
