= TJM =

TJM may refer to:

- Kampo, also known as traditional Japanese medicine (TJM)
- Roschino International Airport, IATA Code TJM
- The Juice Media, an Australian company that produces political and social satire
- Trade Justice Movement, a British coalition campaigning for trade justice
