= Ellougik Essiyasi =

- Genre: Comedy; Politics
- Created by: Sami Fehri; Naoufel Ouertani
- Developed by: Sami Fehri
- Voices of: Wassim Herissi
- Country of origin: Tunisia
- Original language: Arabic
- No. of seasons: 1
- No. of episodes: 80

Production
- Producer: Moez Ben Gharbia
- Running time: from 8 to 15 minutes
- Production companies: Cactus Production; Samurai Prod.

Original release
- Network: Ettounisya TV
- Release: May 9, 2011 – present

Ellougik Essiyasi or The political logic (Tunisian arabic : اللوجيك السياسي) is a Tunisian satirical latex puppet show broadcast on Ettounisya TV. It's inspired by the French show Les guignols de l'info, which in turn is derived from the British satirical puppet show Spitting Image, and presented by Taoufik Labidi

== History ==
Under the regime of Zine el Abidine Ben Ali, the show is broadcast under another name Qaddachna Lougik ! (How logical as we are !), during the month of Ramadan and did not talk about politics but about culture, sport and society. After the Tunisian revolution and the departure of Ben Ali, it was renamed. His first broadcast was on May 9, 2011 with puppets of Ben Ali, Béji Caïd Essebsi and Nabil Karoui. Following the success of this single episode, it turned into a regular program, inserted in the emission of Moez Ben Ghabia inspired by Grand Journal, Ettesia Massaa ( 21 Hours ), from March 1, 2012. It is broadcast every Thursday until June 19, 2012. It is then broadcast every night during the second half of Ramadan 2012.

== Puppets ==
Here is the list of characters with a puppet:

- Taoufik Labidi
- Wassim Migalou
- Zine el Abidine Ben Ali
- Rashid al-Ghannushi
- Hamadi Jebali
- Moncef Marzouki
- Béji Caïd Essebsi
- Ibrahim Kassas
- Nabil Karoui
- Ahmed Ibrahim
- Ahmed Najib Chebbi
- Ala Chebbi
- Hamma Hammami
- Ahmed Mghirbi
- Faouzi Benzarti
