= Marie Lora-Mungai =

French television and media producer and consultant

- Born: Marie Lora; Les Lilas, France
- Education: Sciences Po Paris, ESCP Business School
- Occupations: CEO, entrepreneur, investor, advisor, author, speaker, host
- Known for: Restless Global, Restless Talent Management, Buni.tv, Buni Media, The XYZ Show, Ogas At The Top

Marie Lora-Mungai is a French entrepreneur, investor, advisor, author, speaker & host with a deep expertise in the African Creative Industries and Sports Business. She is the founder and CEO of Restless Global, a strategic advisory firm specialized in the African Creative Industries and Sports Business. She also previously founded or co-founded the talent agency Restless Talent Management, leading African VOD service Buni.tv (acquired by Trace in 2016), and production company Buni Media.

== Education ==
Lora-Mungai graduated from Sciences Po Paris in 2003 with a masters in Political Sciences, and from ESCP Business School in 2004 with a masters in Marketing and Communication.

== Life and career ==
Lora-Mungai started her career in 2004 at CNN's New York bureau, where she occupied various producing positions, including on the shows Paula Zahn Now and Diplomatic License with Richard Roth. During that time, she covered the 2004 US presidential campaign and published Marketing Politique: Mode d'Emploi, an analysis of the political marketing techniques George W. Bush and John Kerry used at the time.

In 2006 she moved to Nairobi, Kenya, to establish herself as a foreign correspondent, working for CNN, Reuters TV, AFP TV, and the BBC World Service in 15 African countries. In 2008, she received a UN Correspondent Association Gold Medal for Best Broadcast for her series of reports on the Darfur crisis. In 2009 she was nominated for Best Television Feature and Journalist of the Year at the DIAGEO Business Reporting Awards.

In 2009 she co-founded Buni Media, a multimedia production company, with political cartoonist Gado (Godfrey Mwampembwa) from Tanzania. Together they launched The XYZ Show, a political satire show with puppets, inspired by Les Guignols de L'Info and Spitting Image. The XYZ Show rapidly became very popular, airing on national television stations Citizen TV, Kiss TV, and later NTV. In 2013 The XYZ Show won the Africa Magic Viewers' Choice Award for Best TV Series.

In 2012 Lora-Mungai launched Buni.tv, one of the pioneers and leading platforms of the VOD space in Africa. In June 2016, Buni.tv was acquired by urban entertainment group Trace TV.

In 2014 Lora-Mungai and Gado launched a similar show to The XYZ Show in Nigeria called Ogas At The Top, which also went viral and was listed by CNN as "one of the 8 African shows to watch". In 2015 it was nominated for Best Online Video at the Africa Magic Viewers Choice Awards.

Two years later, she and business partner Tendeka Matatu announced the launch of talent agency Restless Talent Management at the Cannes film festival. In February 2015, Lora-Mungai launched Restless Global to focus on the development and production of complex and ambitious African stories for an international audience.

Restless Global progressively transitioned away from content production to become a strategic advisory firm specialized in the African Creative Industries and Sports Business, working for clients such as development finance institutions IFC (World Bank Group), Proparco, Afreximbank, and AfDB, the government of France and Nigeria, and private companies like Netflix, Warner Bros., Twitter, FilmHouse Group, Rainbow Sports Group, among others. In particular, Restless Global specialized in the financing of the African Creative Industries, developing investment strategies, dedicated financial tools and vehicles to facilitate public and private sector investment in creative companies. Besides her consulting work for large entities, Lora-Mungai is active as an angel investor and advisor, supporting select African entrepreneurs.

Lora-Mungai is the author of several works on the African Creative Industries. In 2021, she and co-author Pedro Pimenta wrote a comprehensive study published by UNESCO, called The African film industry. Trends, challenges and opportunities for growth. This study, available online, offers a mapping of the film and audiovisual industry in 54 States of the African continent, including quantitative and qualitative data and an analysis of their strengths and weaknesses at the continental and regional levels. In 2025, she published a study for Proparco's CREA Fund entitled Success Stories in the Creative Industries in Africa and Other Emerging Markets, in partnership with PwC Nigeria and Tom Fleming Creative Consultancy.

Lora-Mungai also regularly shares insights on Linkedin, in the press, on various podcasts, or as a speaker at industry conferences. She is the author of HUSTLE & FLOW, a newsletter on the business of Africa's creative industries and sports, with close to 10,000 subscribers.

Lora-Mungai was named a 2013 Rising Talent by the Women's Global Forum, and one of the "30 Women who matter" by L'Express magazine. She is an alumnus of the Choiseul Institute's list of "200 Economic Leaders of Tomorrow". Lora-Mungai was listed by Forbes France as one of the "10 women entrepreneurs to follow in 2016". In March 2017, she was named a Young Global Leader by the World Economic Forum.
