= Le Bébête Show =

- Country of origin: France
- Original language: French

Original release
- Network: TF1
- Release: October 8, 1982 – June 30, 1995

Le Bébête Show (French pronunciation: [lə bebɛt ʃo], The Beastie Show) is a French satirical puppet show created by Stéphane Collaro, that aired on TF1 from 1982 to 1995.

== History ==
The show was introduced in Stéphane Collaro's Collaroshow on channel TF1, in 1982, before becoming a daily broadcast. Major French political figures were designed by artists: Alain Duverne, Jacques Loup, Jean-Yves Grall... representing as characters similar to those of The Muppet Show, with, for instance, François Mitterrand portrayed as a frog named Kermitterrand (and naming himself God), a reference to Kermit the Frog. Most characters were voiced by Jean Roucas, who also acted as the show's host.

Although some French politicians expressed appreciation for their caricatures, some have greeted them with less enthusiasm. Jean-Marie Le Pen sued the show, as he disliked being represented as the vampire "Pencassine", shown wearing a traditional girl's costume from Brittany – a reference to Bécassine, a 1910s classic French comic character, and to Le Pen's origins in Brittany, while retaining his vampire fangs. Édith Cresson expressed great displeasure at her own puppet: she was depicted as an air-headed panther, submissive to the sexual whims of "Kermitterrand".

The series' popularity and ratings began to decline in the 1990s, due to growing competition from Les Guignols de l'info on Canal+. After Roucas' departure in 1994, Collaro revamped the puppets, but this proved unsuccessful, as the show was now seen as an imitation of Les Guignols. It was eventually canceled in 1995.

== Characters ==
- François Mitterrand: Kermitterrand, as Kermit the Frog
- Georges Marchais: Marchy la cochonne as Miss Piggy
- Raymond Barre: Barzzie as Fozzie Bear.
- Jacques Chirac: Black Jack as Sam the Eagle.
- Valéry Giscard d'Estaing and Gaston Defferre: Valéry and Gaston as Statler and Waldorf.
- Ronald Reagan: Ronnie le Cuisinier as Swedish Chef

Eventually, Muppet Show references became less evident, with the introduction of new characters unrelated to the Jim Henson show: Jean-Marie Le Pen as Pencassine, a vampire version of Bécassine, Jack Lang as a goat, Édith Cresson as a panther, Jacques Chaban-Delmas as a duck, Charles Pasqua as a walrus, André Lajoinie as a dimwitted dog, Michel Rocard as a crow, Laurent Fabius as a squirrel, Édouard Balladur as a pelican, Arlette Laguiller as a weasel, etc...

After Gaston Defferre died, Valéry Giscard d'Estaing complained about remaining the only character to be represented as a human (and a grumpy old man, at that). He was then changed into a marabou stork, but complained again, so he became a monkey (Ouistiti Giscard des Singes).

== See also ==
- Les Guignols de l'info
- Spitting Image
- The Wrong Coast
