= The XYZ Show =

- Genre: Political satire
- Created by: Gado
- Based on: Les Guignols de l'info
- Written by: Loi Awat, Titus Maina, Edward Khaemba
- Directed by: King Muriuki & Abdi Shuria
- Presented by: Keff Joinange
- Country of origin: Kenya
- Original languages: English, Swahili
- No. of seasons: 11
- No. of episodes: 110+

Production
- Executive producers: Marie Lora Mungai; Godfrey Mwapembewa
- Producers: King Muriuki, Edward Khaemba and Titus Maina
- Production location: Godown Arts Centre
- Running time: 27–30 minutes
- Production company: Buni Media

Original release
- Release: 2009 – present

The XYZ Show is a Kenyan satirical puppet show.

== The Story ==
=== Inspiration ===
Everything started in 2003. On a trip to Paris, for an exhibition Gado took time to visit the set of "Les Guignols de l'Info", or the "News Puppets". Les Guignols, just like XYZ, is a spoof newscast featuring latex puppets. It has been on the air for more than 20 years and is one of France's most popular shows ever.

To Gado it was immediately obvious that the same concept would not only be a huge success in Kenya, but could also have an important social impact by exposing, with humor, the rampant corruption and mismanagement of the country.

=== The Return ===
Back in Kenya, Gado shopped the idea around to the TV stations, but many had trouble understanding the concept. Still, Gado pressed ahead, and in 2004 he managed to convince the French Embassy in Nairobi to send sculptor Gerald Olewe to France for a month. There Olewe was trained by the team of experts who create the French puppets, and he learned how to work with sophisticated materials such as foaming latex. He came back with a fully finished puppet of Kibaki in his luggage. Olewe held his breath as he innocently walked through the JKIA customs. Luckily, he was not stopped.

Two more struggling years went by until in July 2007, Gado scrapped together a few shillings, got a little bit of money from the French embassy and produced a pilot for the show.

=== Pilot ===
Producing the pilot was a challenge, but it brought together some key team members who would stick around for ever after that: director James Kanja, visual effects artist Pete Mute alias Majiqmud, and the group of puppeteers led by Jack Kibedi.

With the pilot in hand, Gado embarked on a new round of visits to the TV stations. He hit a new wall, or rather two. One, the show was political and controversial. That made a lot of TV executives uncomfortable. Two, it was expensive. There were puppets to make and screenwriters, voice artists, puppeteers, cameramen and more to hire. No one wanted to pay for it.

=== Redefined ===
Gado went back to the drawing board, plotting his next move. Then in November 2007, a TV journalist, Marie Lora, came to interview him for a story about how editorial cartoonists viewed the upcoming presidential elections in Kenya.

After the interview, Gado showed her the XYZ pilot. Straight away, Marie thought that this show absolutely needed to be on the air - and she knew she could help. But the next month, all hell broke loose in Kenya. We now call this period "the post-election violence", but the term doesn't give justice to the madness of these terrible months. At that time, it became even more obvious that Kenya needed a show such as XYZ. Humor appeared like the only possible way to dig ourselves out of the dark hole we had fallen into.

=== The Series ===
Gado and Marie met again. Marie proposed a complete change in strategy: if the show is too expensive for local stations, then let's make it free. But of course, because a TV Show cannot actually be free, that meant finding the money elsewhere. So Gado and Marie embarked on a year-long journey into Nairobi's NGO and foreign embassies underworld. They knocked on every door, they made dozens of contacts, they wrote countless proposals and budgets. They pitched XYZ relentlessly.

Several donors came through with some money. Citizen TV agreed to air the show, and Wachira Waruru became one of XYZ's strongest supporters. A full team of about 50 people representing 11 different communities was hired.

And in May 2009, the first episode of The XYZ Show finally aired.

Series

Season	Year	Dates	No. episodes	TV Station
Season 1	2009	17 May	13 Ep	Citizen TV
Season 2	2010	25 April	13 Ep	Citizen TV
Season 3	2010	20 Sep	13 Ep	Citizen TV
Season 4	2011	1 May	13 Ep	Kiss TV
Season 5	2011	25 Sep	13 Ep	Kiss TV
Season 6	2012	27 July	13 Ep	Kiss TV
Season 7	2013	12 Jan	13 Ep	NTV
Season 8	2013	7 Aug	13 Ep	NTV
Season 9	2014	1 March	13 Ep	NTV
Season 10	2014	4 August	13 Ep	NTV
Season 11	2016	5 April	26 Ep	KTN
Season 12	2017	13 April		NTV

== Awards ==
2013: The XYZ Show wins the award for Best TV Series at the Africa Magic Viewers’ Choice Awards in Nigeria. Buni Media co-founders Gado Mwampembwa and Marie Lora-Mungai visit Lagos, Nigeria as guests of the Ford Foundation Nigeria and IIE. The objective of this visit is to interact with Nigerian media, political scene and market and with potential partners of Buni TV.

Year	Academy	Award	Result
2013	2013 Africa Magic Viewers Choice Awards	Best Television Series	Won
2021	Kalasha International Film and Tv awards	Best TV Comedy	Won

== Format ==
The show commences with the current news events of Kenya. Other segments include:

- what if...
- Poli-tricks with Amanuel Ijumaa
- BS News at 9
- Upclose & personal with Keff Joinange
- Political Hits

== Characters ==
- Jeff koinange, host
- Mr. Wu
- Mwaniki
- Sonko
- Si Mutoko

=== Politicians ===
- Daniel Toroitich Arap Moi
- Mwai Kibaki
- Raila Odinga
- William Ruto
- Uhuru Kenyatta
- Kalonzo Musyoka

=== International politicians ===
U.S presidential candidate Donald John Trump

Rwandan president Paul Kagame

Tanzanian president John Pombe Magufuli

- Zimbabwean President Robert Mugabe
- Ugandan Yoweri Museveni
- U.S. President Barack Obama
- South African President Jacob Zuma

== See also ==
- Kenya Institute of Puppet Theatre (KIPT)
