= Juice Rap News =

Internet based satirical news show

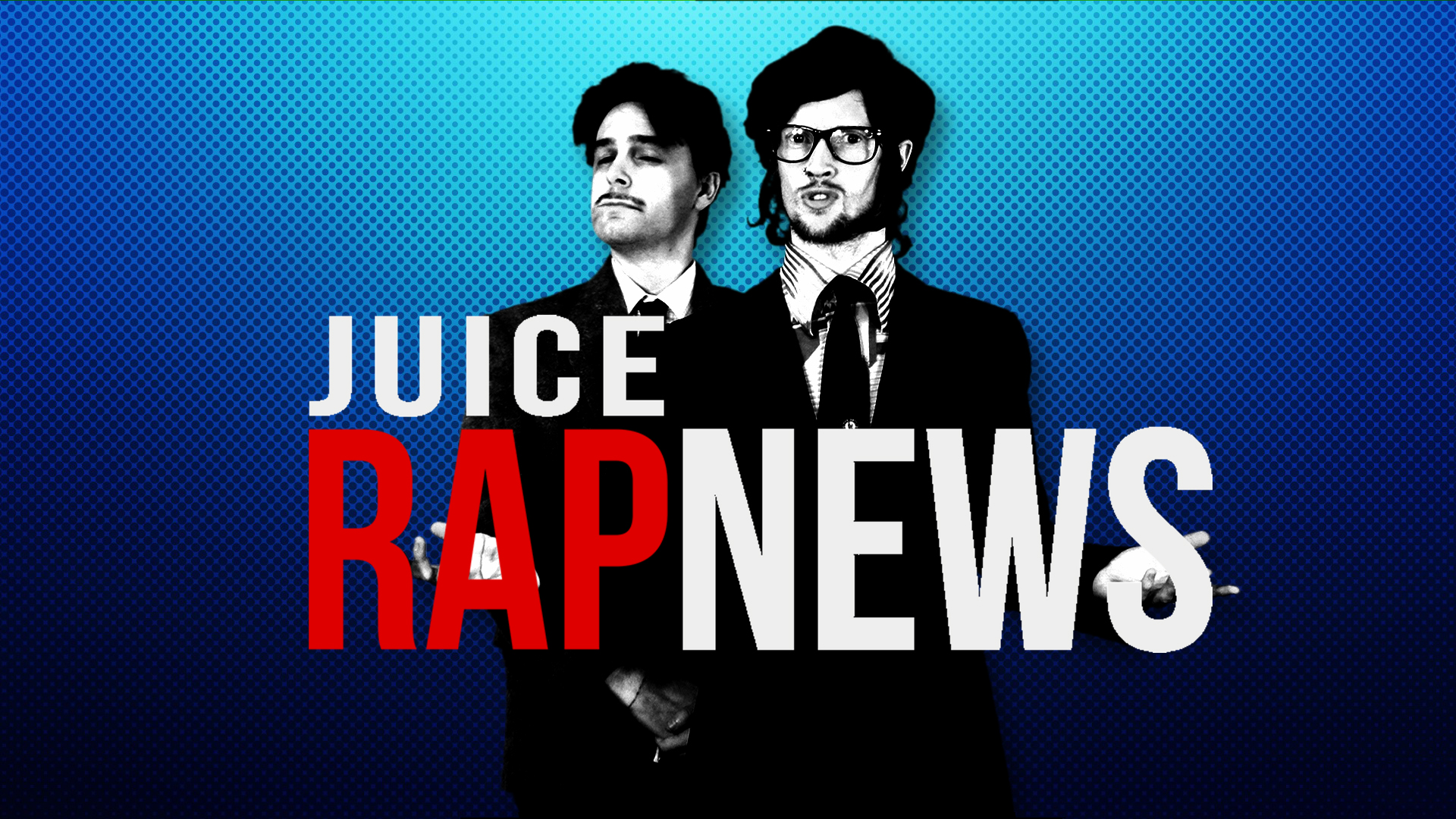
- Genre: Comedy hip hop Current Events Rap
- Created by: Giordano Nanni; Hugo Farrant
- Starring: Hugo Farrant; Giordano Nanni
- Country of origin: Australia
- Original language: English
- No. of episodes: 36

Production
- Producer: The Juice Media
- Production location: Melbourne
- Running time: 4–8 minutes
- Production company: The Juice Media

Original release
- Network: YouTube
- Release: 9 October 2009 – 31 October 2015

Juice Rap News was an internet based satirical news show, created in Melbourne by The Juice Media. The show was the creation of a duo, Hugo Farrant and Giordano Nanni, based in Australia and consists of a rapped "news report" with social commentary using comical rap lyrics. The show is known for using satire and rap rhyming to analyse important topics of the day in a humorous, yet philosophical fashion. Juice Rap News is distributed via YouTube. Some episodes were licensed to the international television news channel RT for rebroadcast. The audience of Juice Rap News is international and episodes have been translated into more than 20 languages. 35 episodes were produced in total, plus a video announcing that the 35th episode was the final they would produce. However, in September 2016, due to audience demand, Giordano Nanni produced a special episode for that year's United States presidential election, and announced that the series would continue to produce content from time to time, with a new crew.

Nanni and Farrant co-wrote and produced the series together in their home studio in Melbourne, Australia. Nanni focused on content (crafting the arguments, narrative and perspectives depicted and explored in the show); while Farrant focused on form (giving the dialogue the "rhyme and flow" of rap and performing the vocals of most of the characters). Farrant portrayed the anchor Robert Foster and a host of other characters, including the regulars General Baxter and Terrence Moonseed. Nanni also appeared in the show, portraying many characters, such as Aussie correspondent Ken Oathcarn, "MSMBS" host Brian Washington, PR host Ivan Sakamunev, Bill de Berg and George Torwell, all using vox by Hugo Farrant. The goal was to provide an alternative view on world events, one that they felt was lacking in popular media outlets.

== Recurring fictional characters ==
=== Robert Foster ===
Robert Foster, performed by Hugo Farrant, is the anchor and central character of Rap News.

=== General Baxter ===
Darth H. Baxter, also performed by Hugo Farrant, is a caricature representing the Military Industrial Complex. When war is in the news, General Baxter is called upon to give the point of view of war-mongering, colonialist governance. Baxter often changes his uniform to represent the topic.

=== Terrence Moonseed ===
Terrence Moonseed, again performed by Hugo Farrant, is the caricature of the resident mad pseudo-scientist / hippy that often counterpoints General Baxter with new age spirituality and conspiracy theories.

=== Ken Oathcarn ===
Ken Oathcarn, portrayed by Giordano Nanni (with vox by Hugo Farrant), is an Australian bogan stereotype and correspondent for Rap News who appears when Rap News handles Australian-centric topics. In July 2013, Ken Oathcarn visited Julian Assange in the Ecuadorian Embassy in London to give Assange a "makeover" for his campaign for senate in Australia.

=== Brian Washington (Brain Washing) ===
Fictional news reporter for "MSMBS" (which is an acronym for Mainstream Media Bullshit and also similar to MSNBC), portraying mainstream American news reporters in a satirical manner.

=== William De Berg ===
William De Berg (Bill De Berg – Bilderberg) is a shady businessman who takes advantage of the situation to capitalise. He represents the international business elite colluding to control government policies and legal systems. He also represents the Illuminati and the New World Order. Bill de Berg filled in for Robert Foster and hosted Episode 36, about the 2016 US Presidential Election.

== Cameo appearances ==
=== Julian Assange ===
Julian Assange appeared in Rap News Number 5 only a few weeks before the "Cablegate" story broke in December 2010. Later, in Episode 20, Assange gets a "makeover" by Ken Oathcarn, donning a mullet wig, singing John Farnham's "You're the Voice" recorded in the Ecuadorian Embassy in London.

=== Noam Chomsky ===
Linguist and political writer Noam Chomsky appeared in Rap News 10.

=== Kristinn Hrafnsson ===
Investigative journalist and WikiLeaks spokesman Kristinn Hrafnsson appeared in Rap News 13 (A News Hope) to defend WikiLeaks in the context of Newscorp's phone hacking scandal.

=== Sage Francis ===
Hip-hop artist Sage Francis appeared in Rap News 21.

=== Abby Martin ===
RT America presenter and journalist Abby Martin appeared in Rap News 23, criticizing military intervention in Crimea.

=== Norman Finkelstein ===
American and Jewish political scientist, activist, professor, and author Norman Finkelstein appeared and rapped in Rap News 24, "Israel vs Palestine", as part of a segment hosted by MSMBS anchorman Brian Washington. Finkelstein calls in to the MSMBS programme and interrupts the conversation between Israeli Prime Minister Benjamin Netanyahu and Brian Washington to criticise Israel's actions towards Palestine. He refers to Israel as a "lunatic state" and tells Bibi to "shut up" after the Israeli statesman accuses Finkelstein of being a "self-hating Jew".

=== DAM ===
Palestinian rap group DAM appeared and rapped in Rap News 24, "Israel vs Palestine". The Palestinian trio filmed their scene in Ramallah next to the separation wall that divides Israel from the West Bank. In the episode, they conduct a conversation across the wall with Ken Oathcarn who is on an assignment to Israel to learn about its similarities with Australia as a settler colony. The DAM trio inform Ken Oathcarn about the day of the "Nakba" and voice their support for a one state solution to the conflict.

=== Scott Ludlam ===
Senator of the Australian Greens party, Scott Ludlam appeared and rapped in Rap News 29, criticizing the actions of Prime Minister Tony Abbott in the lead-up to the 2014 G-20 Brisbane summit, labelling Mr Abbott's laws as "a fascist fuckfest of Orwellian proportions" and claiming to "go full Gandalf on this government's arse, smack down their laws with a dose of you shall not pass" before appearing dressed as Gandalf in the episode's credits.

== Controversies ==
Rap News 20 caused controversy when it was released during the 2013 Australian Federal Election. Most of the controversy surrounded Julian Assange's appearance in the episode. The character Ken Oathcarn (played by Nanni) convinces Assange that if he is to be successful in his election bid for a Senate seat, he is in need of a make-over. Assange dons a flannel shirt, a blonde mullet wig and a fake Australian flag tattoo, and proceeds to sing a parody of John Farnham's "You’re The Voice." The video went viral soon after being posted online. It also featured on The Chaser's 2013 federal election coverage and Ten's The Project.

The offending scene was filmed in London's Ecuadorian Embassy where Assange has remained since seeking political asylum on 19 June 2012, which he was granted in August 2012. After Rap News went viral, Assange was publicly chastised for his appearance in the video by Ecuadorian President Rafael Correa, who said,

"We have sent him a letter: he can campaign politically, but without making fun of Australian politicians. We are not going to allow that. The rules of asylum in principle forbid meddling in the politics of the country that grants asylum. But as a matter of courtesy we are not going to bar Julian Assange from exercising his right to be a candidate. Just so long as he doesn't make fun of Australian politicians or people."

This was the first public indication of any friction between Assange and his Ecuadorian hosts.

Furthermore, many major media outlets failed to recognise Rap News 20 as satire, calling it a "campaign video," in what Farrant and Nanni described as "true to form."

In an interview with ABC Radio, the duo addressed the controversy and confusion, saying,

"In the world of the internet parody culture, what we’re doing is accepted and most people and most of the comments on the video and on Twitter and Facebook are overwhelmingly positive. It’s no surprise that once things are taken out of context and brought into the world, of, you know, the considerably more sober world of the mainstream media, these out of context quotes can be portrayed as offensive…We don’t really engage with that audience. Our audience is on the internet. We really pride ourselves on making an internet show and we’re trying to get people away from the more conventional, centralised, one-way media model, such as, basically, the traditional media. We love the fact that people can watch the video, post comments, we reply to comments, it’s a two way dialogue, it’s a totally different culture".

On 14 September 2013, Farrant and Nanni notified viewers that a copyright claim had been filed against the video for the parodic use of Farnham's "You're the Voice", despite protection for parody and satire under Part III: 41A and Part IV: 103AA of the Australian Copyright Act. On 26 October 2013, the duo uploaded a version without the parody, as an agreement with copyright holders had not been reached.

== Reception ==
As of November 2017, the YouTube channel hosting Rap News has received more than 17 million total video views; additionally the channel has over 118,000 subscribers.

Rap News has been warmly received by organisations that advocate whistle-blowing including WikiLeaks and The Kindle Project.

The Rap News videos—either individually, or as a whole series—have been featured on a large number of esoteric and fringe-view websites. (Examples:)

=== Rap News 5 (The War on Journalism) ===
Rap News 5 was 'video of the week' on an edition of Al-Jazeera's The Listening Post, which aired on 27 November 2010. A heavily edited version of RN5 (lasting just over 60 seconds) played out during the episode.

=== Rap News 15 (Big Brother is WWWatching You) ===
In a very brief article, Michael Kelly of Business Insider wrote about Rap News, saying "This Australian website calls out the immense rise in US domestic surveillance" and went on to describe the Rap News 15 segment as "informative and entertaining".

Rap News 15 also came to the attention of American cryptographer and security expert Bruce Schneier, who posted a link to the video on his website, accompanied with text simply stating: "wow".

=== Rap News 19 (Whistleblower) ===
Australian Senator Scott Ludlam quoted verbatim a small excerpt from Rap News 19 to conclude a speech he was making in the Australian Senate regarding whistle-blowers. The exact portion he quoted was "Whistleblowers; they leak in the public interest. Now what remains to be known is – is the public interested? If so, this might be a good day to exhibit it! Ignorance is a choice, in the age of the internet."

=== Rap News 20 (A Game of Polls) ===
See controversies.

=== Rap News 22 (The Energy Crisis) ===
Zachary Shahan of TreeHugger and CleanTechnica wrote two brief reviews of Rap News 22 in which he claimed to have "really enjoyed it and thought it was quite well done" but went on to say "while they are satirizing conspiracy theorists and global warming deniers, they probably reinforce the myths more than dispel them."

=== Rap News 23 (Crimea Media Wars) ===
Rap News once again made The Listening Post's 'video of the week', with RN23. A two-minute extract from the Crimea Media Wars video was aired on 5 April edition of the program.

== Episodes ==
=== Season 1 (2009–2011) ===
No.	Title	Length	Original release date	Link
1	"Earth bombs the Moon"	5:03	4 October 2009	
Robert Foster presents the news that on 9 October 2009 Earth carried out its first bombing attack on a neighbouring astronomical body – the moon. This episode covers NASA's LCROSS satellite collision with the moon. Anchor Robert Foster interviews caricatures General Darth H. Baxter (also played by Farrant) and Conspiracy Theorist Terrance Moonseed all played by Hugo Farrant.
2	"Barack Obama wins the Nobel War-is-Peace Prize"	5:12	11 October 2009	
Recurring guests General Baxter and Terrence Moonseed return to the studio with Robert Foster to discuss the fall-out from the LCROSS Moon Bombing, and learn that Barack Obama has just been awarded the Nobel Peace Prize.
3	"Climate Change – Lord Monckton Rap Battles Al Gore"	6:40	17 November 2009	
The first episode to feature impersonations of real figures, in this case Lord Christopher Monckton and Al Gore, going head to head over Climate Change.
4	"The WWWar on the Internet – feat. Wikileaks vs The Pentagon"	6:00	3 July 2010	
Featuring General Baxter and an impersonated Julian Assange, discussing the merits of leaking information. Coincided with WikiLeaks release of the Collateral murder video.
5	"The War on Journalism (feat. Julian Assange)"	5:59	27 October 2010	
In this episode Robert Foster interviews an impersonation of former "Secretary of the Offense" Donald Rumsfeld, but Rumsfeld becomes enraged at Robert's pointed questions and has him black-bagged by General Baxter. Then the show is hijacked by the News World Order – led by an impersonation of Fox News' Bill O'Reilly. This episode features a cameo by Julian Assange.
6	"Cable-gate 'The Truth Is Out There'"	6:23	17 December 2010	
WikiLeaks releases a gigantic cache of diplomatic cables, which comes to be known as Cablegate, much to the ire of impersonated Secretary of State, Hillary Clinton, and also Prison Planet's Alex Jones. Featuring a parody of The Gregory Brothers Bed Intruder.
7	"#Revolution comes to America"	8:17	24 March 2011	
In the wake of the Arab Spring, and the protests against Governor Scott Walker in Milwaukee, Juice Rap News went into fantasy mode, imagining what it would be like to have widespread political protests in the USA. Features impersonations of John Pilger and Glenn Beck.
8	"Osamacide"	5:47	18 May 2011	
Robert Foster invites back recurring guests General Baxter and Terrence Moonseed for an analysis of the recent assassination of Osama bin Laden.
9	"The Economy (Ron Paul vs The Zeitgeist Movement)"	7:09	28 September 2011	
During one of a number of debt ceiling crises in the USA, Robert Foster invites (impersonations) independent candidate Ron Paul to debate The Zeitgeist Movement's Peter Joseph.
10	"2012"	7:37	21 December 2011	
As the momentous date of 21 December 2012 approaches, and Occupy Wall Street is in full swing, Robert Foster invites Terence Moonseed and General Baxter back to discuss the future. Featuring Occupy Wall Street and Noam Chomsky.

=== Season 2 (2012–2013) ===
No.	Title	Length	Original release date	Link
11	"Australia Day"	3:56	23 January 2012	
Robert Foster conducts a live interview with Australian Correspondent Ken Oathcarn (played by Giordano Nanni) and tries to find out the meaning behind the yearly national celebration of Australia Day. This episode was also performed live at the Woodford Folk festival to be later broadcast on ABC Radio National
12	"Yes We KONY"	3:37	12 March 2012	
As the internet collectively decides to hunt a man called Joseph Kony, Robert Foster invites General Baxter to the studio to discuss what it all means.
13	"A News Hope (Julian Assange vs News Corp)"	6:25	30 May 2012	
Julian Assange (played by Giordano Nanni) faces deportation from the UK, and leaker Chelsea Manning is languishing in a US military prison being tortured by General Baxter. It seems like the empire has struck back. But who is the Emperor? Rupert Murdoch. A Star Wars parody, featuring Kristinn Hrafnsson.
14	"Higgs Boson Unbound (feat. Prof. Scott Ridley)"	3:34	9 July 2012	
As the scientific community celebrates the discovery of the Higgs Boson, Robert Foster meets new character Professor Scott Ridley to discuss the event.
15	"Big Brother is WWWatching You (feat. George Orwell)"	6:00	5 September 2012	
Regular guests Terence Moonseed and General Baxter return to discuss the Orwellian implications of the recent revelations regarding the Surveillance State. George Orwell advocates the use of Tor network.
16	"I have a Drone – Barack Obama vs Mitt Romney"	4:34	15 October 2012	
The 2012 election – the final debate between Mitt Romney (played by Giordano Nanni) and Barack Obama (played by Ben Bizuneh) – hosted by Robert Foster.
17	"The War on Terra"	5:15	30 January 2013	
Canada and Australia go head to head to see which of them can claim the title of most environmentally destructive former colonial country. Featuring Australian correspondent Ken Oathcarn, and Canadian correspondent Fagin Heighbard – both played by Giordano Nanni using vox by Hugo Farrant.
18	"The Gun Debate"	4:51	7 February 2013	
General Baxter and Terrence Moonseed meet in the studio to discuss the seemingly irresolvable issue of gun rights in the USA.
19	"Whistleblower feat. Edward Snowden"	5:32	15 June 2013	
This episode is primarily about Edward Snowden and the NSA leaks in mid-2013. Robert Foster invites General Baxter to the studio to discuss the state of the Empire, but Baxter's good mood is shattered by Glenn Greenwald's revelations of leaks.
20	"A Game Of Polls – The Australian Election"	5:49	25 August 2013	
This episode featured Julian Assange in costume singing You're the Voice. This episode featured Sean Bedlam as Kevin Rudd, Hugo Farrant as Tony Abbott and Ellen Burbidge as Julia Gillard and Julian Assange as Julian Assange. News website Crikey, in their 2013 federal election coverage noted that Julian Assange in a mullet wig singing along to Farnsy is one of the best moments of the campaign so far.

=== Season 3 (2014) ===
No.	Title	Length	Original release date	Link
21	"The News"	6:42	25 January 2014	
Robert Foster welcomes viewers back to the new season of Rap News with a tour of the News itself. Re-introducing characters such as General Baxter, Terrence Moonseed and Ken Oathcarn. New character Ivan Sakamunev appears – an anchor for PR, the Russian International news station in the Rap News universe. Also includes parodies of Max Keiser and Russell Brand. Features cameo by Sage Francis.
22	"The Energy Crisis"	6:25	27 February 2014	
Robert Foster investigates the Energy Crisis, inviting a number of guests to propose solutions, or dismiss it. General Baxter extols the virtues of the Keystone XL Pipeline; new Chinese character Wai So Dim reports from a smog-filled Beijing on the 'One Coal Policy' and the colonisation of Tibet; Terrence Moonseed and Australian Premier Tony Abbott both deny climate change; while Richard Branson and Elon Musk report on their billionaire eco-activities. The episode concludes with a Juice Channeling Portal interview with Copernicus, who encourages humanity to embrace the 'Second Heliocentric Revolution' of Solar Energy.
23	"Crimea: Media War Games"	5:54	17 March 2014	
Features cameo by Abby Martin.
24	"Israel vs Palestine"	8:18	24 April 2014	
Features cameo appearances by Norman Finkelstein and Palestinian Rap trio DAM (band)
25	"Net Neutrality"	6:21	23 May 2014	
On the topic of open Internet policies, Robert Foster interviews the creator of the modern World Wide Web, a Willy Wonka-like Tim Berners-Lee. Advocates of open policies include Terrence Moonseed and even Mark Zuckerberg. However, shady businessman William de Berg has other ideas for the future of the Internet.
26	"The World Coup: THIEFA vs Brazil"	7:49	21 June 2014	
27	"MSMBS News Headlies: ISIS, Gaza, Ukraine and more..."	6:58	30 August 2014	
28	"The Singularity – feat. Ray Kurzweil & Alex Jones"	6:58	20 September 2014	
Ray Kurzweil gives a zealous TED talk about "the Singularity", much to General Baxter's delight, while Alex Jones tries to stop the creation of a superhuman A.I. (artificial intelligence).
29	"G20 Rap with Tony Abbott – feat. Scott Ludlam"	6:36	23 October 2014	
Features Australian Senator Scott Ludlam, portraying both himself and Gandalf.
30	"The New World Order – with Russel Brand & Bill de Berg"	7:05	29 November 2014	
Explains the concept of the New World Order from various perspectives, portraying activist Russell Brand, along with the series' resident conspiracy theorist and business elite.

=== Season 4 (2015–2016) ===
No.	Title	Length	Original release date	Link
31	"The EuroZone Austerity Crisis – feat. Greece, Angela Merkel, Slavoj Žižek & IMF"	6:47	11 April 2015	
Parodies the European debt crisis in the context of the Eurovision Song Contest, including portrayals of anti-austerity activists, Angela Merkel, Slavoj Žižek, and Christine Lagarde.
32	"MSMBS News: Black Lives Matter?"	6:37	23 May 2015	
Satirises news media in the United States and its coverage of the Black Lives Matter campaign.
(Note: This episode was released as "an express Rap News Call Out about an urgent matter", and was not given an episode number.)	"The Great Barrier Reef"	2:35	14 June 2015	
Draws attention to the potential effects of coal exports on Australia's Great Barrier Reef, criticising the impacts of Abbot Point and the Adani Group.
33	"Dope Francis Raps the 10 Climate Commandments"	5:40	26 June 2015	
Summarizes Pope Francis's Laudato si' in the style of the Ten Commandments, commenting on global warming and criticism of the Catholic Church.
34	"IMMIGRANTS! Feat. Donald Trump and Tony Abbott"	7:08	25 July 2015	
Portrays Donald Trump, Katie Hopkins, Tony Abbott, and New World Order member, William de Berg supporting opposition to immigration, and participating in the free trade debate.
35	"THE INTERNET – Feat. Dan Bull"	7:54	27 September 2015	
Discusses the Internet, its sociology, and its future, featuring Dan Bull as the personification of the Internet.
36	"HILLARY vs TRUMP (Special Edition)"	6:51	19 September 2016	
Bill de Berg hosts a debate between Hillary Clinton, Donald Trump and several third-party candidates in the 2016 United States presidential election. This episode features Melbourne rappers MANTRA, Class-A and Grey Ghost.

== See also ==
- Les Guignols, in France
- 26 minutes, in Switzerland
