= Gado (comics) =

Tanzanian political cartoonist (born 1969)

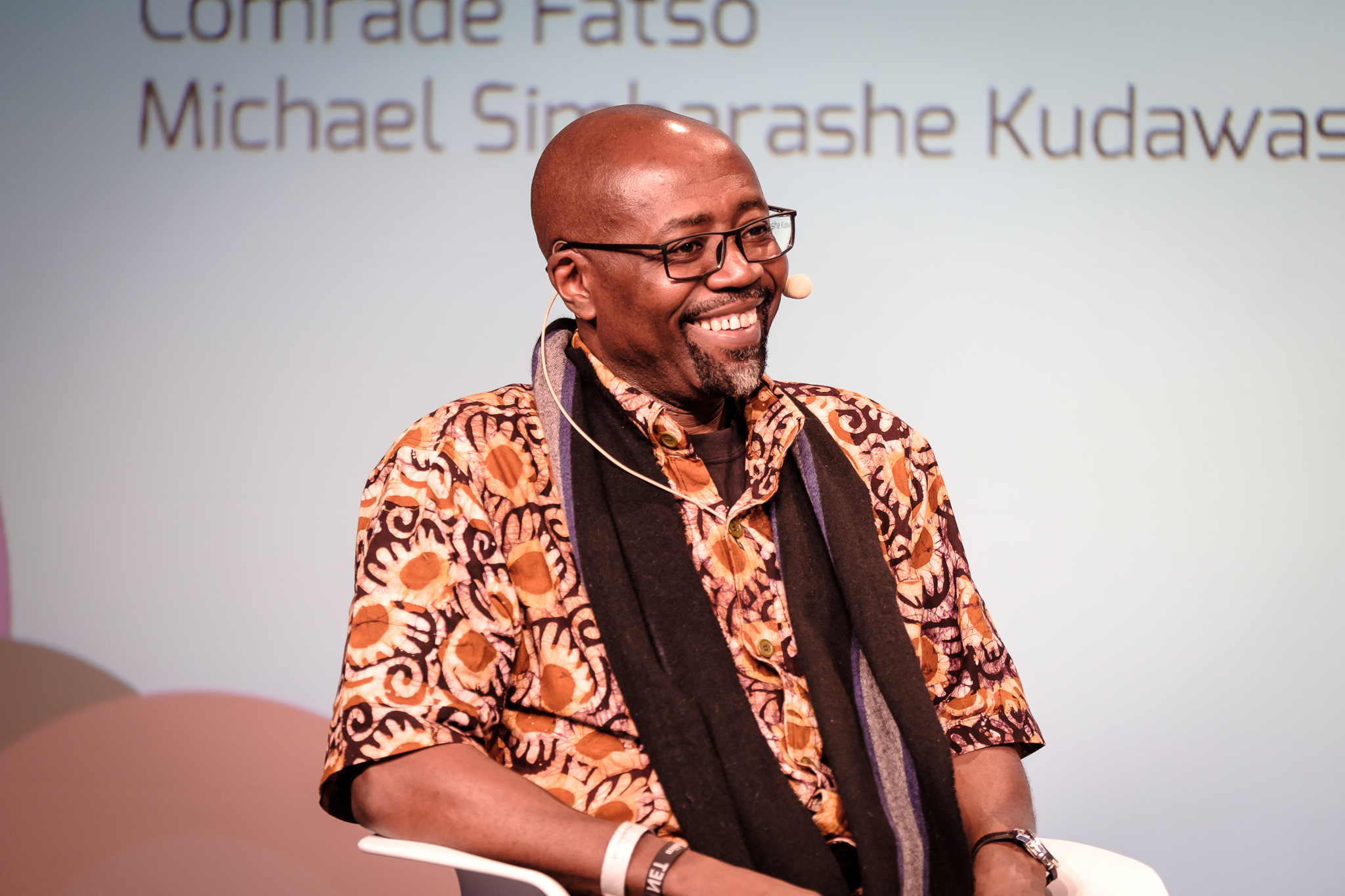
Portrait of Godfrey Mwampembwa

Godfrey Mwampembwa, pen name Gado (1969) is a Tanzanian-born political cartoonist, animator and comics artist. He is the most syndicated political cartoonist in East and Central Africa, and for over two decades a contributor for Daily Nation (Kenya), The Standard (Kenya), New African (United Kingdom), Courrier International (France) as well as for Business Day and Sunday Tribune (both South Africa). He also produced cartoons for The East African, Le Monde, The Washington Times, Der Standard and Japan Times.

He served as an editorial cartoonist at the Daily Nation until he was fired in March 2016.

== Early life and education ==
Godfrey Mwampembwa, or Gado as he is popularly known, was born on August 6th, 1969, in Dar es Salaam, Tanzania.

Gado joined the Ardhi Institute in Dar es Salaam in 1991 to study architecture. After a year, he left the institute to become the Nation Media Group cartoonist and illustrator.

Between 1996 and 1997, he studied animation at Fabrica, a communication research centre in Treviso, Italy. Thereafter, in 2000, he studied classical animation and film making at the Vancouver Film School, graduating in 2001.

== Career ==
Gado designs funny cartoons on local regional and international issues, which he clarifies the impact of social, political and cultural conflicts have on the individual. With simplicity he brings brittle elements up without going to the essential humanity of these topics.

Gado opposes political interference and is a local pioneer who explores his limits. He is an inspiration for other artists through its contribution to the democratization and the freedom of expression in eastern Africa. He is the most syndicated cartoonist in East and Central Africa.

In 2009, together with Marie Lora-Mungai, Gado co-founded Buni Media, an independent non-profit media and production company that is known for the XYZ TV show that Gado created and produced.

In 2016, the Nation Media Group, on whose publications Daily Nation and The East African Gado's cartoons had appeared for over two decades, refused to renew his contract over what appeared to be the result of blowback following the latter publication's suspension in Tanzania after Gado's cartoon depicting then President Jakaya Kikwete in a compromising position surrounded by harems was published. Gado then joined the Standard Group where his editorial cartoons appeared in The Standard newspaper from 2016 through 2022.

== Awards ==
In 1996 he was awarded the International Olympic Media Award for print media, and in 1999 was Cartoonist of the Year Kenya.

In 2007 he was awarded the Prince Claus Award of the Prince Claus Fund in the Netherlands for the theme Culture and conflict. The jury praised him for "his courageous cartoons, which he humorously shows aspects of social and political conflicts, and an inspiration to the struggle of free expression."

Gado was one of 12 people who received the Visionaries Award in 2011 from the Ford Foundation.

In 2014 and 2016, Gado was named as one of the 100 most influential people in Africa by The NewAfrican, Africa’s most influential magazine. Together with cartoonist Zunar from Malaysia, Gado received the Cartooning For Peace Award by Kofi Annan on World Press Day, May 3, 2016.

== Family life ==
Gado is married to his wife Stephanie Uwingabe and, together, they have daughters Mwaji-Odeta and Keza-Anganile.

== Works ==
- Abunuwasi
- An animated cartoon for MTV
- The XYZ Show
- Democrazy
- The End of an Error, and the Beginning of a New One!
- Crisis…? What Crisis?!
- Africanism 101
