= The Juice Media =

Australian satire film and media company

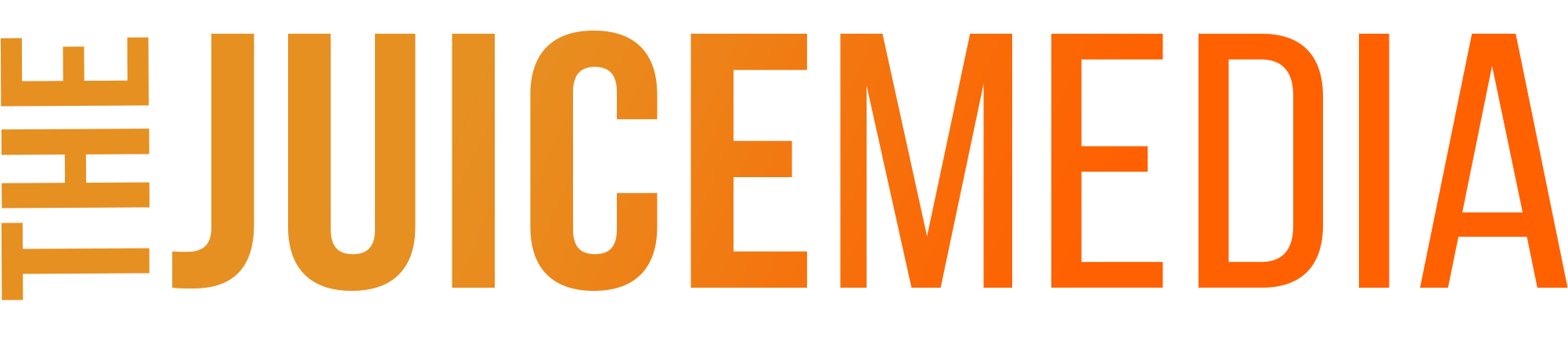
- Industry: Film and media
- Founded: May 2008; 18 years ago
- Founder: Giordano Nanni
- Headquarters: Melbourne, Australia

YouTube information
- Channel: thejuicemedia
- Years active: 2008–present
- Genres: Political commentary; journalism; satire
- Subscribers: 1.06 million
- Views: 136 million
- Last updated: April 2025
- Website: thejuicemedia.com

The Juice Media (TJM) is an Australian company that produces contemporary, human rights, social and political satire. They are known for their Internet series Honest Government Ads and Juice Rap News. TJM's use of the parody "Australien Coat of Harms" logo prompted a Bill that introduced a new criminal offence to the Criminal Code Act 1995 regarding impersonating a Government agency.

== History ==
TJM was founded by Giordano Nanni, an Australian historian, author, satirist and video producer. TJM started publishing on YouTube in May 2008 with the first episode of Juice Rap News premiering on 4 October 2009.

On 28 May 2016, the Juice Media launched the Honest Government ad series with Visit Australia.

=== Australia Day (Piracy parody) ===
On 24 January 2017 TJM released a parody video called "Australia Day (Piracy parody)", which compared celebrating Australia Day on 26 January, when the First Fleet planted a flag on Australian shores, to celebrating several appalling historic events, including the "Final Solution" by Nazi Germany, dropping of the atomic bomb on Hiroshima and 11th of September attacks on the Twin Towers. The video was a parody of the anti-piracy ad, "You Wouldn't Steal a Car".

The video was released as part of the Change the Date campaign (represented by the hashtag #changethedate) which calls for changing the date of Australia Day by Aboriginal, Torres Strait Islander and wider community groups, on the grounds that celebrating the date that marked the beginning of Indigenous land being forcibly taken, which led to many killings of Aboriginal Australians, is insensitive. The video incited a great deal of debate, especially on social media, including negative sentiments expressed especially at the comparison of 26 January to other historical dates.

== Honest Government Ads ==
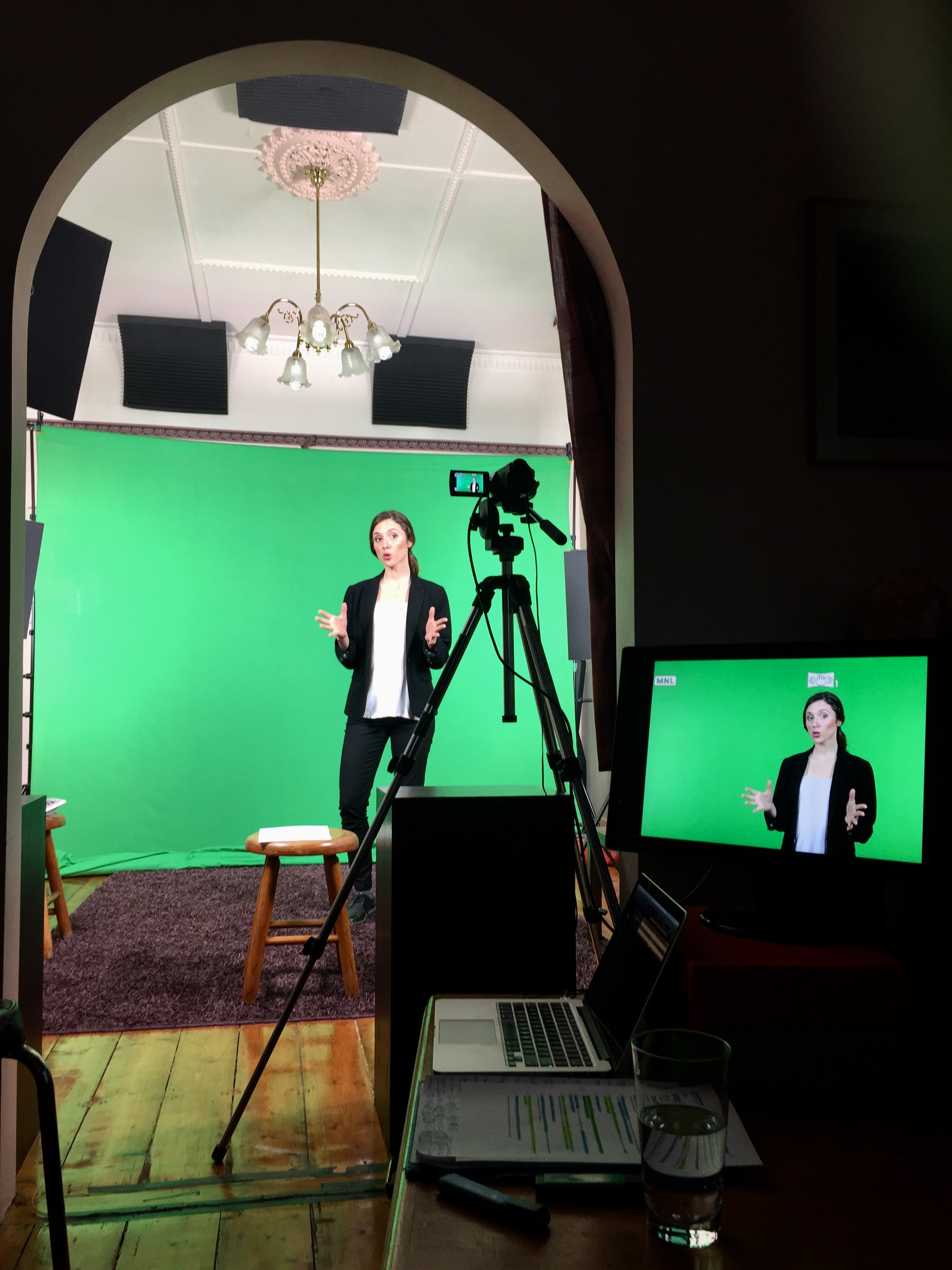
Filming with Ellen Burbidge

A parody advertisement on the Australia Day debate

The Honest Government Ads are filmed in Melbourne. They are written by Giordano Nanni who creates the series in collaboration with Lucy Cahill. Actors appearing in the series are credited as Ellen Burbidge, Zoë Amanda Wilson, Liv Rian, and additionally Matylda Buczko-Koren, with Lucy Cahill also being credited with the voice overs.

These videos are a satirical take on Australian Government advertising. Each video targets a current social or political issue and highlights potential consequences of the Government's position and policy on that issue. Nanni has cited frustrations with Australian government on "climate, accountability and its callous treatment of youth and workers" as the impetus to create the series. The Honest Government Ads are occasionally made for the governments of other countries, including Brazil, the United Kingdom, and the United States. Videos criticizing Indonesian control of Western New Guinea and the government of India have been blocked in the targeted countries.

"And an increasingly popular way of sharing the 'honest truth' about political events is through satirical videos, something that The Juice Media does brilliantly. They bring attention to the ridiculousness of political and worldwide events, not only by making people laugh but by being blunt about what is going on and how people are being taken advantage of. Not everyone agrees with their left wing politics, but it gets people talking."

=== Australien Coat of Harms ===
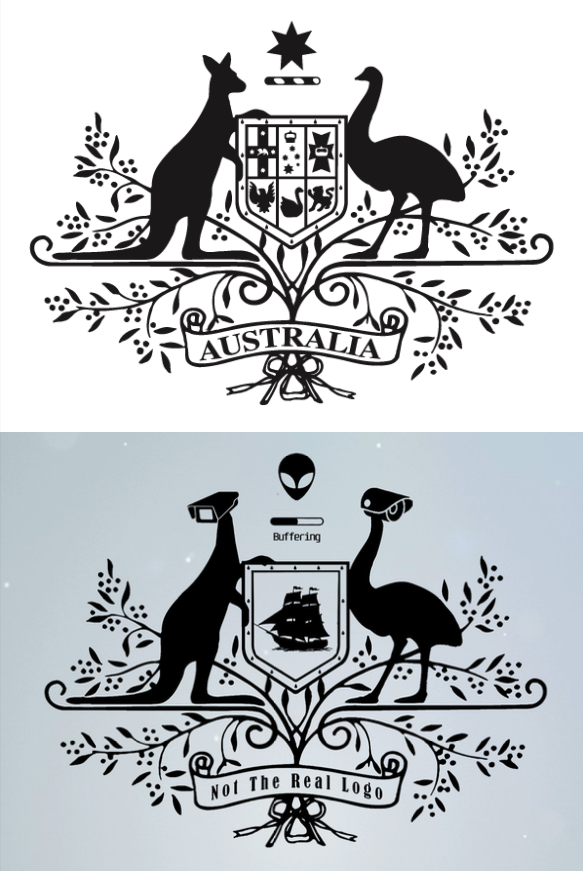
Commonwealth Coat of Arms (top) compared with the parody by The Juice Media

The Australien Coat of Harms was created as the backdrop to the fictitious Department of Genuine Satire for the Honest Government Adverts. There are a number of notable differences between the fictitious Coat of Harms and the Commonwealth Coat of Arms that it lampoons, including a stylised alien head replacing the Commonwealth star, the heads of the emu and kangaroo being replaced with surveillance cameras, the six state emblems on the shield have been replaced with a square-rigged sailing ship, as well as the addition of the words "Not the Real Logo".

In September 2017, TJM received an e-mail from the Australian National Symbols Officer requesting that the use of the satirical logo no longer be used as they had received complaints from the members of the public about the logo. Five days later a Bill was proposed to Australian parliament to amend the Criminal Code Act 1995, with the intention of introducing "new offences for a person recklessly or intentionally representing themselves to be, or to be acting on behalf of, or with the authority of, a Commonwealth entity or service".

The case for the amendments to the Bill was presented in the Senate by the Attorney-General of Australia, George Brandis. There were a number of public submissions to the Senate Legal and Constitutional Affairs Committee overseeing the proposed amendments. Among the submissions were pieces from Australian Lawyers for Human Rights and Electronic Frontiers Australia, both of which expressed concerns about the Bill regarding freedom of speech, the lack of safeguards, and ambiguous wording in the Bill which could result in legal action being taken against critics and satirists. This was a sentiment echoed by Greens MP Adam Bandt in a speech to parliament in which he addressed the topics of freedom of speech and the rights to "mercilessly troll government". Senator Nick McKim stated "Where does this leave satire in Australia? Does it mean that figures such as Shaun Micallef, The Juice Media and The Chaser team, as well as upcoming comedians, will have to think twice before they crack jokes lest they find themselves on the stand or in the slammer?". McKim also commented that as Australian common law has never dealt with defining satire, those producing it "will be in the dark as to the potential limits of their jokes until a body of common law has been established".

On 21 June 2018, the Criminal Code Amendment (Impersonating a Commonwealth Body) Bill 2017 was passed by both Houses and moved into law. Those found to be in breach of the new amendment could face 2–5 years' imprisonment. Videos since then have been labeled "Genuine Satire", in reference to the text of the law granting an exemption for such.

== Juice Rap News ==
The Juice Media created Juice Rap News, a satirical news show on YouTube consisting of a rapped "news report" with social commentary using comical rap lyrics. The series ran from 2009 until 2015. Additionally, episodes were licensed to be broadcast on Russian State Broadcaster RT.
