= Ibrahim Kassas =

Tunisian politician

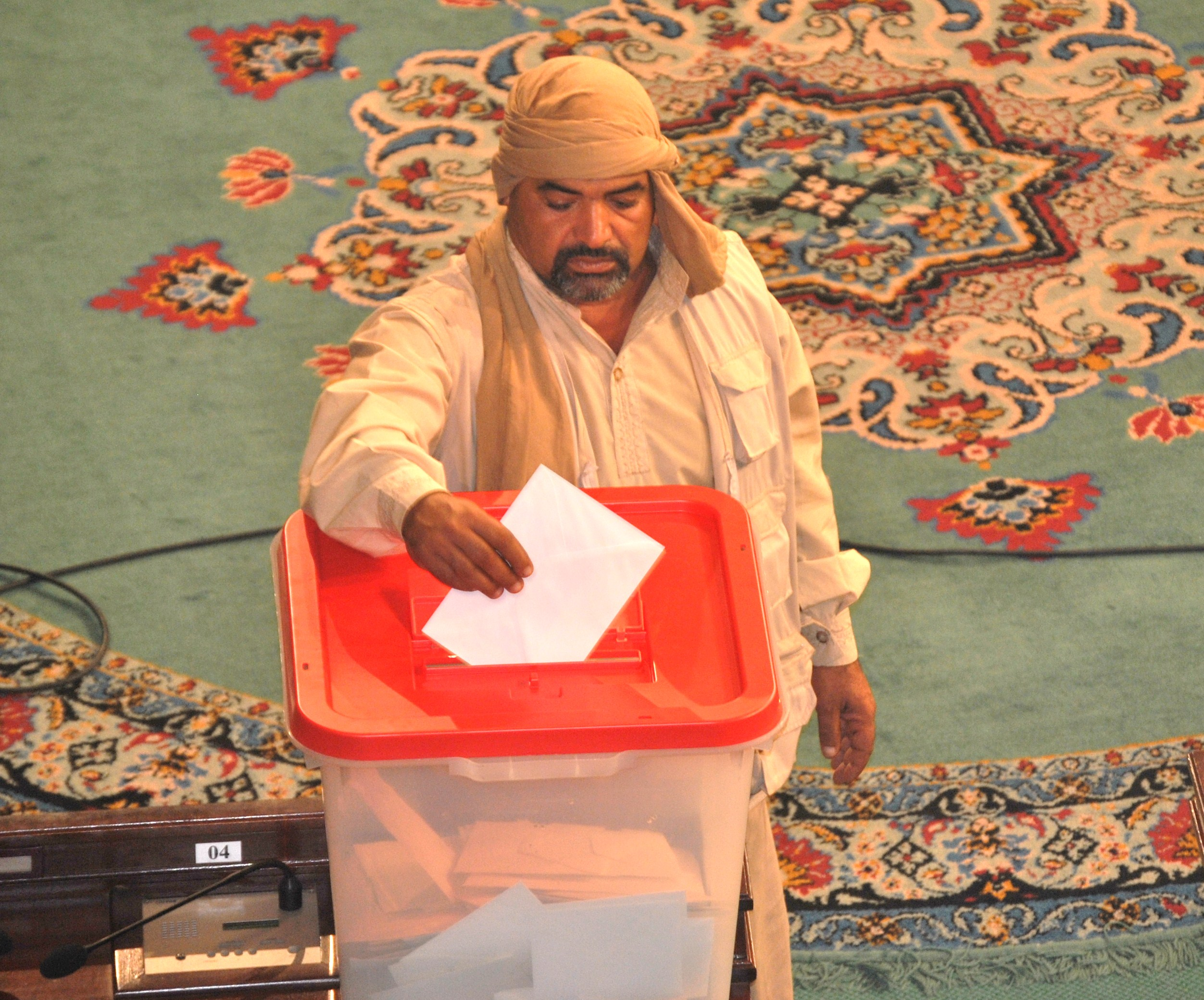
Ibrahim Kassas during the election of the constituent assembly's president

Ibrahim Kassas is a Tunisian politician and one of the 217 members of the Constituent Assembly of Tunisia.

== Biography ==
=== Professional career ===
Young, he left Tunisia to have a turn in Europe and found himself in Iraq where he found a job and met his wife. Later, he came back to his country where his life condition was hard. There, he worked as truck driver and afterwards became a driver of share taxis with the help of Kebili governor.

=== Political career ===
He had little to no knowledge of politics but learnt as he watched television. Thereafter, he engaged in the election of the constituent assembly and got elected by his people. He does not hesitate to boldly criticize the government, constituent assembly and the president of the Republic. He quickly became famous for his interventions broadcast on the national TV station Al Wataniya 2.
