= Les Guignols =

Daily satirical latex puppet show on French Canal+

- Also known as: Les Arènes de l'info (1988-90); Les Guignols de l'info (1990-2015); Les Guignols (2015-18); La Semaine des Guignols (1992-2018)
- Genre: Adult puppeteering Political satire Animation; Comedy
- Voices of: Yves Lecoq; Daniel Herzog; Sandrine Alexi; Thierry Garcia; Marc-Antoine Le Bret; Mathieu Schalk
- Country of origin: France
- Original language: French

Production
- Running time: 8 minutes
- Production company: Canal+

Original release
- Network: Canal+
- Release: 29 August 1988 – 22 June 2018

Les Guignols (French pronunciation: [le ɡiɲɔl], The Puppets), formerly Les Guignols de l'info (French pronunciation: [le ɡiɲɔl də lɛ̃fo], The News Puppets), is a satirical latex puppet show on the French television channel Canal+. The show, which ran daily, was created in 1988 and drew inspiration from the French program Le Bébête Show (1982–1995) and the British puppet satire Spitting Image (1984–1996). Using a format similar to a news broadcast, the show satirized the political world, media, celebrities, French society, and international events.

Throughout the years, it usually aired at 7:50 p.m. as a segment of other Canal+ shows, such as Nulle part ailleurs or Le Grand Journal. On Sunday afternoons, Canal+ aired a weekly recap called La Semaine des Guignols, featuring a back-to-back replay of the week's episodes.

The show began in 1988 as Les Arènes de l'info (News Arenas). Initially, it did not cover current events in real-time and was less popular due to being scripted weeks in advance. However, in the 1990–91 season, the show rebranded as Les Guignols de l'Info and shifted to daily news commentary. It then enjoyed a tremendous growth in popularity with its different coverage of the first Gulf War, and quickly eclipsed its rival, Le Bébête Show.

The structure of the series stayed constant throughout the years: a headline, a few quick stories, a pre-recorded video skit, an interview with a personality, then one last story. It rarely diverged from this layout, usually only doing so to drive points across further (e.g. replacing all news with a seven-minute interview of one of the Sylvestres during the 2003 Iraq War).

== Impact on popular culture ==
The Guignols have had a tremendous impact on French popular culture, in many cases introducing or popularizing phrases. For example, à l'insu de mon plein gré ("without the knowledge of my own free will"), repeated by Richard Virenque's puppet, is now attributed in jest to people who hypocritically deny having willfully committed attributed acts.

The show also went far in how violently it challenged and portrayed public figures. Some sketches displayed for example Raymond Barre, a former Prime Minister in a homosexual gonzo pornographic scene, Philippe Séguin (then candidate for Paris Mayor) in sadomasochist performances, President Jacques Chirac and his team in a Pulp Fiction–like destruction race to eliminate their competitors or the then-Minister of Interior Department Nicolas Sarkozy and foreign affair minister Dominique de Villepin as head of rival criminal gangs in a Sin City and in a Gangs of New York parody.

The show also used horror movies to spoof politicians. President Jacques Chirac was represented as Leatherface chasing environmentalist politicians Antoine Waechter and Brice Lalonde in a parody of The Texas Chain Saw Massacre, as Jack Torrance in a Shining parody where he was assaulting Jacques Toubon in a bathroom with a giant fountain pen after he had read the single sentence in the book he was writing, and as Ash Williams in a parody of Evil Dead where a Kandarian Demon spoke with the voice of the late president François Mitterrand. President François Hollande appeared as a Catholic priest in a parody of The Exorcist where (then presidential candidate) Lionel Jospin was possessed by a demon. The dead were raising from their grave on Election Day to cast votes for Jean Tiberi (then Paris mayor) in a parody of Night of the Living Dead. Environment Minister Ségolène Royal was shown as victimized by an electric car named Corinne in a parody of John Carpenter's Christine. The rival program of TF1 Le Bébête Show was spoofed in a parody of Freaks in which Étienne Mougeotte (head of programming at TF1) was captured by Kermitterrand and his friends and turned into another (duck-like) puppet for trying to cancel the show due to its low ratings.

Besides horror movies, works by Quentin Tarantino were also parodied. One controversial parody (Inglorious Cathos) showed the Pope Benedict XVI hiring (in a scene more reminiscent of The Dirty Dozen) a commando of 3 bishops (a paedophile, a Holocaust denier, a radical traditional catholic) to fight the infidels. One South Park parody, used instead of puppets cartoon characters drawn in the style of Eric Cartman (with the voice of Philippe Séguin), Kyle Broflovski (with the voice of Nicolas Sarkozy), Stan Marsh (with the voice of François Bayrou) and Kenny McCormick (with the voice of Valéry Giscard d'Estaing). At the end of the skit, Kenny was getting killed and the other congratulated each other for doing a good thing together. The Guignols have generally displayed a left-leaning political outlook (although being tough on whoever is in power). While they generally focused on French politics, they also often riffed off of international events, a key focal point being United States foreign policy in general, including Osama bin Laden, the Iraq conflict and Saddam Hussein. These spoofs on international events were usually presented in an anti-Bush manner, portraying the fictional "World Company" (see below) as being the true leaders, not the president himself. They also regularly called out and mocked their own TV channel, Canal+, and its executive staff, especially during its 2002 crisis.

=== Political influence ===
The impact of political caricature in the Guignols is unclear, but some polls have shown that they have influenced voters. According to Ipsos (2002), the show had a good reach within the younger 18-32 audience segment. According to media, the popularity of Chirac's puppet has undeniably played a role in his 1995 election as Les Guignols had become a major broadcaster of biased political opinions. The show had created an electoral slogan for Chirac ("Mangez des pommes") that the candidate reused publicly during his campaign.

The French journalist Hugo Cassavetti criticized how the show evolved from a political goof for everyone to a partisan show with a political agenda, turning Canal+ into a leftist political hub. Bruno Gaccio reminded that Les Guignols "aren’t real, it’s fake news-it’s just comedy", and also said "if American audiences could get a brief dose of Guignol humor, their perceptions would never be the same again."

Les Guignols created mixed reactions regarding their provocative coverage of the September 11 attacks, for example when they portrayed Osama bin Laden triumphantly singing "It’s Raining Planes", or by depicting George W. Bush as mentally challenged. By 2002, 3.5 million viewers watched the show everyday, including 25% of the 15-25 segment.

=== Catchphrases ===
Some catchphrases are recurrently used during the show.

- Le Monsieur te demande... (The gentleman is asking you...) loudly pronounced by the Chirac puppet when repeating the question of the interviewer to the Giscard puppet, to suggest that he is deaf or senile.
- Putain, deux ans ! (Damn, two years!) In 1993, Balladur is prime minister, while Chirac must wait two years to run for president. His puppet keeps repeating that sentence, suggesting his impatience to become president.
- à l'insu de mon plein gré See above. Repeated by Virenque's puppet to deny that he knew he was taking performance-enhancing drugs.
- Oh oui, quelle humiliation ! (Yes, what a great humiliation! ) Repeated by Philippe Séguin's puppet during the run-up to the mayor election in Paris, anticipating on his defeat.
- Tout à fait Thierry ! Used by the puppet of Jean-Michel Larqué when commenting soccer matches with Thierry Roland.
- Salut, Bonhomme. (Hello boy/lad) is used by Bernard Tapie to salute PPD.
- Pt'it fromage qui pue. (Little stinking cheese) used by M. Sylvestre (Sylvester Stallone's puppet) when talking of French people or when saluting PPD.
- Excusez la tenue, je sors de la douche. (Sorry for the bathrobe, I was in the shower) Repeated by the Dominique Strauss-Kahn puppet who is always in bathrobe when doing interviews.
- Ah que... (Oh, how...), verbal tic of the Johnny Hallyday puppet who'd use it to emphasize his sentences ("Ah que bonjour", "Ah que merci", etc).

== Famous characters ==
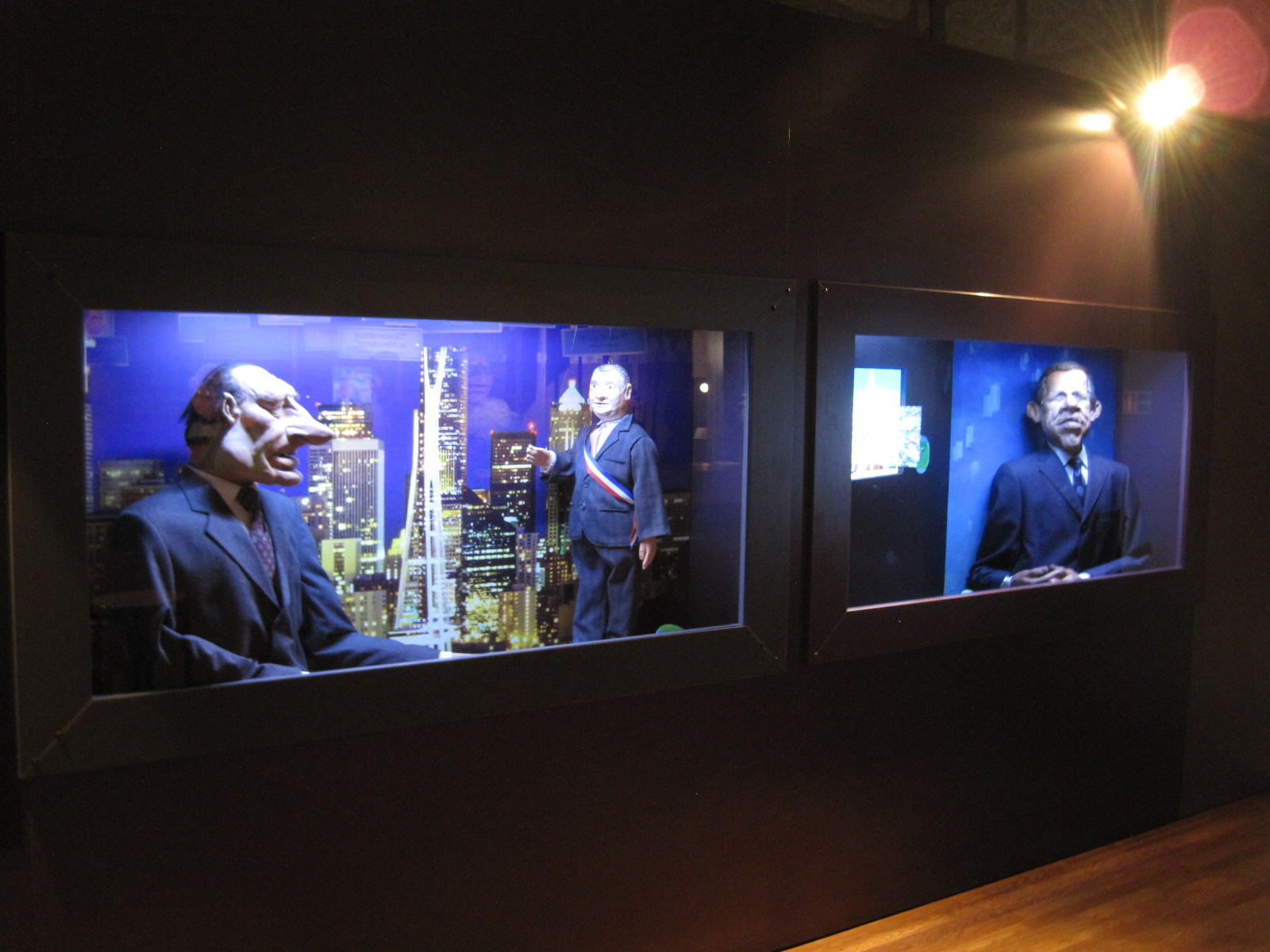
Puppets of Patrick Poivre d'Arvor and Jacques Chirac

The characters appearing in Les Guignols were based on real personalities of the political, economic and artistic worlds; generally, anybody deemed newsworthy. The show also had a few dozen anonymous puppets at its disposal.

- PPD is a caricature of Patrick Poivre d'Arvor (who is himself nicknamed PPDA), a news anchor who was on the TF1 network until 2008. He served as the main anchor of the show since its first season. He was depicted as a rather cowardly journalist who tries to get on with the mighty and the powerful, but used irony and sarcasm to get his point across. He also sported a variety of hairstyles, in an attempt to mask his receding hairline. Despite the end of the news anchor career of the real Patrick Poivre d'Arvor, "PPD" wasn't retired until the 2015 season.
- Sylvestre, Commandant Sylvestre, Cardinal Sylvestre, and many others, both named and unnamed, all with the same face and voice, were fictional characters based on the likeness of the American actor Sylvester Stallone, although when it was the actor himself who was represented, or Rambo, he had a distinct appearance and a different voice. The Sylvestres were parodies of "an ugly American", of greedy multinational corporations, and the military–industrial complex. They always introduced themselves with "beuuarhh" (IPA: [bœwaʁ]), a slurred version of "bonsoir" (IPA: [bɔ̃.swaʁ], good evening). During the first Gulf War, the Guignols introduced a character called Commandant Sylvestre. He would explain the war in broad oversimplified terms ("Here's the good guys, that's us, and here are the ragheads, so we'll kill everybody there..."). After the gulf war, he was reintroduced as Mr. Sylvestre, a ubiquitous executive from the military-industrial complex, the corporate world, and the CIA, all mixed into the fictional mega-corporation World Company. Sylvestre was dressed in a suit and tie, with a security badge. Other Sylvestres, dressed as Cardinals, Reverends, Imams, Rabbis, and other religious leaders, were also portrayed as the Church Company, the twin sister of the World Company, specializing in "the business of religion". During the 2017 season, he was the show's main anchor. In the very last episode, he was the CEO who fired PPD and Jacques Chirac.
- Jacques Chirac, the president of France from 1995 to 2007, was depicted as a beer-guzzling, impulsive, incompetent liar, while coming off, at the same time, as relatable and well-loved. The show introduced Super Menteur (Super-Liar) during the 2002 presidential campaign, a Superman-like super hero Jacques Chirac changes into at times of need. Super Menteur is capable of uttering unbelievable lies without getting caught. Jean-Marie Le Pen publicly approved the accuracy of the puppet's alter ego, thus instrumentalizing the Guignols to feed his base. Only one person is a better liar, Ultra menteur (Ultra-Liar), portrayed by French retired politician Charles Pasqua, who was convicted in some corruption cases. Chirac served as the show's main anchor in its last season, in 2018.
- George W. Bush was depicted as a cretin along with his father. He shows a tendency to war and fights terrorism in his bedroom, defending himself with hand grenades (beer cans). His laptop password is "connard" (one of the French words for "dumbass"). He often appears along with one of the Sylvestres, who gets portrayed as the guy who's really in charge. Remarkably, Bush's character spoke in French with an American (or English, foreign) accent, whereas M. Sylvestre spoke French without any foreign accent, after the French dubbed voice of Sylvester Stallone in his films.
- Joey Starr and Doc Gynéco: The rapper Joey Starr, convicted of violence, is portrayed as a brutal individual. He is often coupled with rapper Doc Gynéco to discuss the consumption of cannabis.
- Bernard Tapie, a French businessman, is represented as a braggart, speaking in a frank, blunt and vulgar way.
- Patrick Le Lay, head of the TF1 TV channel paired with Etienne Mougeotte, head of programming at TF1. Mougeotte is regularly portrayed as a hypocrite who schedules documentaries on prostitution or sex-oriented reality TV programs and pretends doing that to inform the public, while Le Lay always reveals that the actual purpose is only to improve ratings. Le Lay has been also portrayed as the emperor in a spoof of The Empire Strikes Back and as the blind superior in a spoof of The Name of the Rose.
- Jean Marie Le Pen, former head of the Front National far-right political party. He was sometimes represented with a pitbull's head. After the handover to one of his daughters, Marine Le Pen, his puppet appeared rarely, sometimes as the éminence grise of Marine Le Pen, his daughter and successor, other times as a bluntly-speaking bigot she had to reel in and control in order to appear acceptable to public discourse.
- Philippe Lucas, a former trainer of the French Olympic world and European champion swimmer Laure Manaudou, was portrayed as a heavily muscled, homophobic guy who criticized most French athletes, suspecting them of physical and mental weakness. He always concluded his criticism by the catchphrase "Et pis c'est tout !", an incorrect contraction of Et puis c'est tout (And that's it).
- Bernard Laporte, a former authoritarian rugby scrum half, coach (both club teams and national team), former secretary of state, often appeared to praise the violence in rugby, which his puppet described as the valeurs de l'ovalie (the values of rugby), with many hyperboles (open fractures, neck cracking, enucleations, coma, crowbar fighting ambush).

In recent political history, the Guignols have also regularly portrayed:

- Lionel Jospin, former prime minister, as competent and honest, but boring. Other puppets nicknamed him "bean up the butt". He was later depicted as disappointed by France (he passes, from time to time, to scream "pays de merde !", roughly "this country sucks"), since the first round of the 2002 presidential election, in which he failed to get to the second round.
- Édouard Balladur former prime minister who ran for president against Chirac. In the show, Chirac's puppet nicknames him Couille molle (soft testicle). Balladur's puppet appeared in a spoof of Trainspotting where he is suffering from an addiction to political power. As Balladur tried to get rid of his upper class manners during his presidential campaign, his puppet was shown unshaved, with vulgar manners, calling Sarkozy Nico and drinking cheap beer.
- Roselyne Bachelot-Narquin, a former minister of health, youth affairs and sports, then former minister of culture, was depicted as an incompetent airhead, clueless about all questions related to her ministry, welcoming questions from PPD with "Ah bon !?" ("Oh, really!?").
- Nicolas Sarkozy, former president, was depicted as overly ambitious, populist, and short-tempered. He collected Rolex watches, and kept diverting attention to his wife, Carla Bruni. Like the real politician, he was insecure about his short height, and always wore shoes with heels to compensate. After Sarkozy came back to the French politics scene in 2014, he was portrayed as someone who claimed he had "really changed" regarding his short temper, but the facade often fell off to reveal someone worse than before.
- Valéry Giscard d'Estaing, former president, was seen as dogmatic and repetitive, usually seen wearing his green habit vert (ceremonial dress), as he is a member of the Académie Française. One running gag is that Giscard d'Estaing was dead, but too stubborn to admit it, or even acknowledge it.
- Ségolène Royal, the socialist party candidate for the 2007 presidential election, as constantly following opinion polls, pretending to be a woman of the people.
- François Bayrou, the centrist 2012 candidate for the presidency who has delusions of grandeur. His huge-eared puppet was constantly portrayed as childish and whiny.
- Dominique Strauss-Kahn after his arrest in 2011 was portrayed as a pervert wearing only a bathrobe with Leopard spots and calling his penis Francis. Interviewed by PPD as a consultant on economics, he was giving answers in economics jargon (such as animal spirits, tension, invisible hand, spheres full of liquidities etc...) that made no sense except as sexual double-entendre that PPD either does not understand or feigns not to understand.
- François Hollande, elected president in 2012, was depicted as an overweight and silly politician who lacked charisma.
- Nadine Morano was seen as a very scurrilous and rough politician, who unconditionally supported Nicolas Sarkozy, often alongside David Douillet, a former world champion in judo and minister of sports, who was himself depicted a very simple-minded man.
- Angela Merkel, the German chancellor, who was portrayed, since the end of 2011, of controlling the entire European Union.

== Visual identity ==
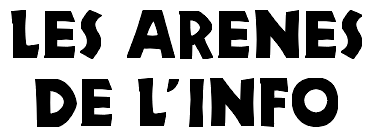
Opening title of the Arènes de l'info from August 29, 1988, to August 26, 1990

Opening title of the Guignols de l'Info from September 14, 1992, to June 27, 2015

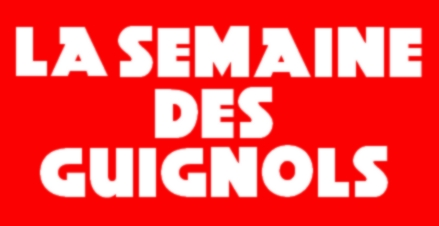
Opening title of La Semaine des Guignols from 1995 to 2018

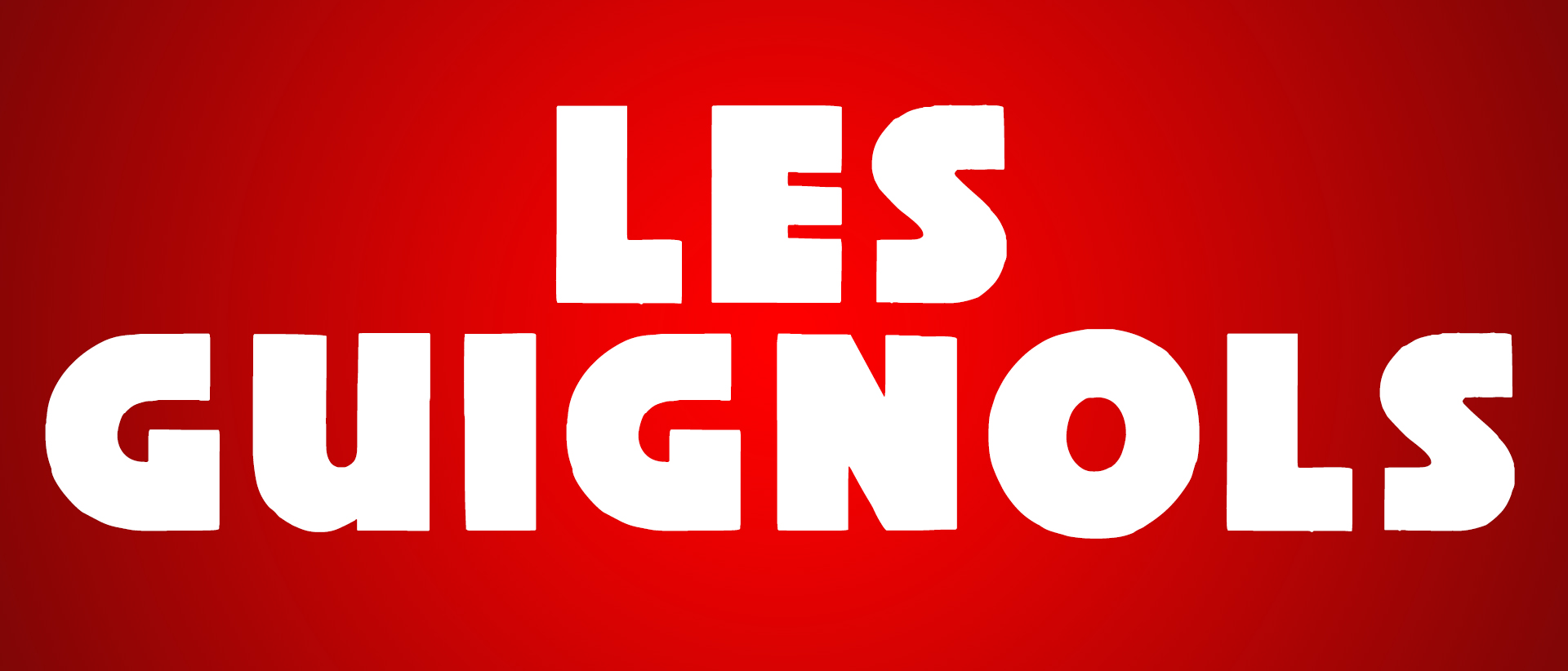
Opening title of the Guignols from December 7, 2015, to June 14, 2017

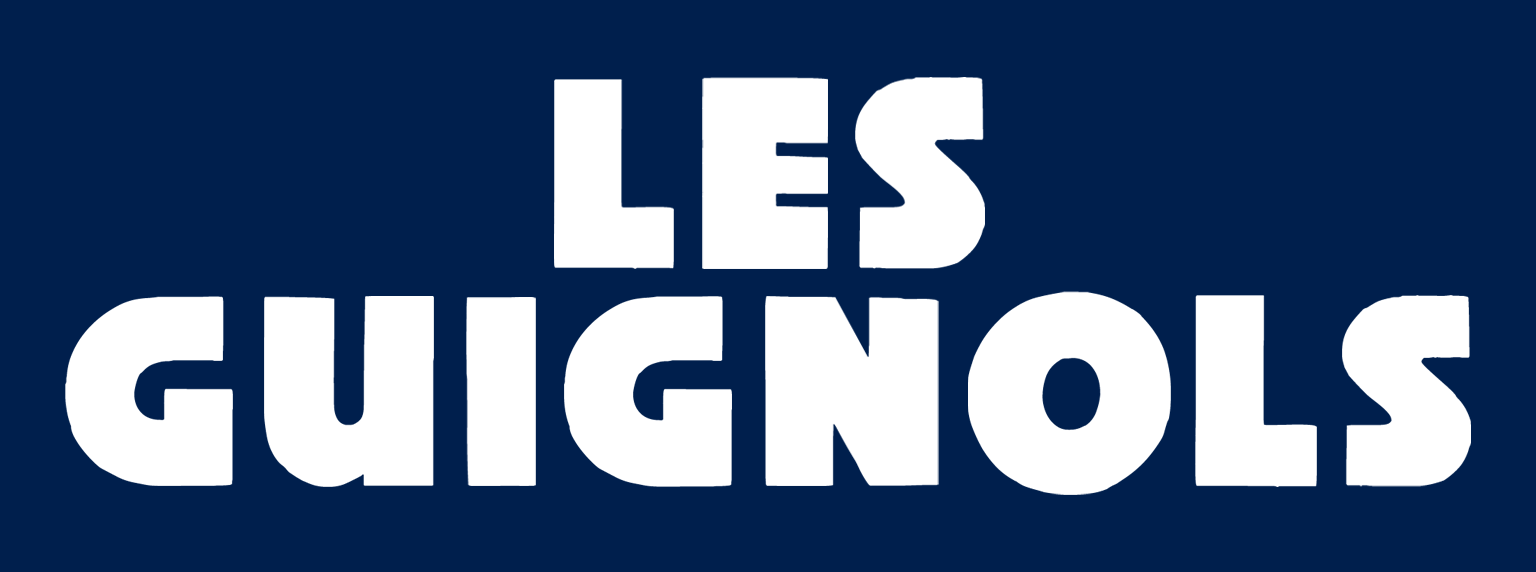
Opening title of the Guignols from October 13, 2017, to June 22, 2018

== Criticism ==
The Guignols have been criticised for being leftist and populist, and for presenting a cynical and over-simplified version of reality and politics. The show's authors have admitted leftist leanings. Erik Svane has accused the show of being anti-American.

After the departure of two of the original authors in the late 1990s, the show has been criticized as lacking wit and freshness and having become too overtly populist and partisan. Some critics claim that the show is in decline. The show's treatment of Nicolas Sarkozy has been criticized as biased. Bruno Gaccio, prior to the French presidential election of 2007, was said to have admitted that he meant the Guignols to openly campaign against Sarkozy, but later stated that he had been misquoted.

In 1997, Peugeot sued the show for the distorted use of its brand name, but also because of how the show characterized its CEO Jacques Calvet.

François Bayrou, who was depicted as a weak childish man who could sometimes throw a tantrum, said "The image, very demeaning, hurts. My puppet has nothing to do with who I really am."

== Cancellation ==
Following the dismissal of the main four writers in July 2015, the channel's new executives decided to move the show to the encrypted, non-free time slots. This decision was brought into effect the following December (the show returning months late after the executive shakeup), although the show was made available to the general public as a Dailymotion stream after being broadcast on air ("La Semaine des Guignols", the weekly roundup of the show, continued to be broadcast free-to-air on Sundays). This change, as well as many other creative changes, brought about a decline of the programme, until the final episode was broadcast on June 22, 2018.

== Elsewhere ==
- The XYZ Show is the Kenyan equivalent of the French original.
- Puppets is the Russian political satire equivalent of Les Guignols.
- Les Guignols d'Afrique is the Cameroonian equivalent of the French original.
- Las noticias del guiñol is a show in Spanish Canal+ inspired by Les Guignols. It focuses on Spanish politics and football.
- Contra Informação is a long-running Portuguese equivalent broadcast on RTP1. It was cancelled in 2010.
- ContraPoder is an updated version of Contra Informação. It was premiered in March 2013 in the cable channels SIC Notícias and SIC Radical.
- Ellougik Essiyasi, the Tunisian counterpart.
- les Guignols du Maghreb, another Tunisian Les Guignols de l'info-inspired latex puppetry TV Show that ran on Nessma TV.
- Los Toppins, the Chilean equivalent, which featured prominently Augusto Pinochet after his dictatorship.
- ZANews is the South African equivalent of the French original.
- Douma Kratiye, the Lebanese adaptation created by Charbel Khalil that ran on the Lebanese Broadcasting Corporation International from July 7th, 2008 until June 3rd, 2016 and then on Al Jadeed from 2016 until 2017.

Programs of the Guignols family exchange latex moulds, and puppets representing foreign celebrities can be used as "normal people" in countries where those personalities are not well-known.

In September 2020, American broadcaster Fox greenlit an adaptation of the series, Let's Be Real, with plans to air a one-off special on 1 October themed around the 2020 United States presidential election. Robert Smigel served as executive producer.

== See also ==
- Guignol
- Le Bébête Show, an earlier show on the TF1 network
- Groland
- Et Dieu créa... Laflaque, in Quebec
- Spitting Image
- D.C. Follies
- The Wrong Coast
- The Daily Show
- This Hour Has 22 Minutes
- Puppets
- Juice Rap News, in Australia
- 26 minutes, in Switzerland
